= 2021 Los Angeles Dodgers season =

2021 Los Angeles Dodgers
- National League Wild Card
- League: National League
- Division: West
- Ballpark: Dodger Stadium
- City: Los Angeles, California
- Record: 106–56 (.654)
- Divisional place: 2nd
- Owners: Guggenheim Baseball Management
- President: Stan Kasten
- President of baseball operations: Andrew Friedman
- Managers: Dave Roberts
- Television: Spectrum SportsNet LA (Joe Davis or Tim Neverett, Orel Hershiser or Nomar Garciaparra, and Kirsten Watson or David Vassegh) (Spanish audio feed) (Jaime Jarrín, Pepe Yñiguez, Fernando Valenzuela)
- Radio: KLAC-AM; Los Angeles Dodgers Radio Network (Charley Steiner, Tim Neverett, Rick Monday); KTNQ (Jaime Jarrín, Pepe Yñiguez, Fernando Valenzuela)

The 2021 Los Angeles Dodgers season was the 132nd season for the franchise in Major League Baseball (MLB), their 64th season in Los Angeles, California, and their 59th season playing their home games at Dodger Stadium.

The Dodgers started the season 13–2, matching the best 15-game start by a defending world champion. On September 14, the Dodgers clinched a spot in the postseason for the ninth consecutive season extending the longest streak in franchise history, but they failed to clinch the National League West for the first time since 2012, finishing one game behind the San Francisco Giants. Los Angeles had the most ever wins (106) of any MLB team that failed to win its division or league, surpassing the 104 wins of the 1909 Chicago Cubs and 1942 Brooklyn Dodgers. They beat the St. Louis Cardinals in the NLWC Game and the San Francisco Giants in five games in the NLDS before losing to the eventual World Series champion Atlanta Braves in the NLCS in six games. It was the fifth NLCS appearance for the Dodgers in the last six seasons.

== Offseason ==
=== Broadcasting team ===
Alanna Rizzo, who had been part of the Dodgers studio broadcast crew for seven seasons, announced that she was going to leave her position with the team. Jorge Jarrín also resigned from his role on the Dodgers Spanish language broadcast team. The Dodgers hired Kirsten Watson to replace Rizzo on February 13.

=== Coaching staff ===
Dodgers first base coach George Lombard departed the team on November 7, as he was hired to be the new bench coach for the Detroit Tigers. He was replaced by Clayton McCullough.

=== Roster departures ===
On October 28, 2020, after the conclusion of the World Series, seven Dodgers players became free agents: third baseman Justin Turner, outfielder Joc Pederson, utility player Kiké Hernández, and pitchers Pedro Báez, Jake McGee, Blake Treinen, and Alex Wood. A couple of days later, the Dodgers declined the 2021 option on pitcher Jimmy Nelson's contract, making him a free agent. Outfielder and pinch runner Terrance Gore was outrighted to the minors and removed from the Dodgers roster on October 31. Pitcher Josh Sborz was designated for assignment on February 11. On February 12, 2021, the Dodgers traded pitcher Dylan Floro to the Miami Marlins in exchange for Alex Vesia and Kyle Hurt.

=== Roster additions ===
On December 2, the Dodgers acquired relief pitcher Corey Knebel from the Milwaukee Brewers in exchange for a player to be named later or cash considerations. On December 29, the Dodgers acquired pitcher Garrett Cleavinger from the Philadelphia Phillies as part of a three-team trade that sent José Alvarado to the Phillies and minor leaguer Dillon Paulson and a player to be named later to the Tampa Bay Rays. Also on the same day, they signed pitcher Tommy Kahnle to a two-year contract. On January 5, the Dodgers re-signed pitcher Blake Treinen to a two-year contract. On February 11, 2021, the Dodgers signed starting pitcher Trevor Bauer to a three-year contract. On February 12, the Dodgers traded pitcher Adam Kolarek and minor league outfielder Cody Thomas to the Oakland Athletics in exchange for infielder Sheldon Neuse and minor leaguer Gus Varland. On February 19, the Dodgers re-signed third baseman Justin Turner to a new two-year contract.

Off-season 40-man roster moves

Departing Player	Date	Transaction	New Team	Arriving player	Old team	Date	Transaction
Pedro Báez	October 28	Free agent	Houston Astros	Gerardo Carrillo	Oklahoma City Dodgers	November 20	Added to 40-Man roster
Enrique Hernández	October 28	Free agent	Boston Red Sox	Andre Jackson	Oklahoma City Dodgers	November 20	Added to 40-Man roster
Jake McGee	October 28	Free agent	San Francisco Giants	Zach Reks	Oklahoma City Dodgers	November 20	Added to 40-Man roster
Joc Pederson	October 28	Free agent	Chicago Cubs	Edwin Uceta	Oklahoma City Dodgers	November 20	Added to 40-Man roster
Blake Treinen	October 28	Free agent	Los Angeles Dodgers	Corey Knebel	Milwaukee Brewers	December 2	Trade
Justin Turner	October 28	Free agent	Los Angeles Dodgers	Garrett Cleavinger	Philadelphia Phillies	December 29	Trade
Alex Wood	October 28	Free agent	San Francisco Giants	Tommy Kahnle	New York Yankees	December 29	Free agent signing
Jimmy Nelson	October 30	Option declined	Los Angeles Dodgers	Blake Treinen	Los Angeles Dodgers	January 5	Free agent signing
Terrance Gore	October 31	Outrighted	Atlanta Braves	Trevor Bauer	Cincinnati Reds	February 11	Free agent signing
Josh Sborz	February 11	Designated for assignment	Texas Rangers	Sheldon Neuse	Oakland Athletics	February 12	Trade
Adam Kolarek	February 12	Trade	Oakland Athletics	Alex Vesia	Miami Marlins	February 12	Trade
Dylan Floro	February 12	Trade	Miami Marlins	Justin Turner	Los Angeles Dodgers	February 19	Free agent signing

== Spring training ==
Spring training non-roster invitees

Player	Position	2020 team(s)
Josiah Gray	Pitcher	Los Angeles Dodgers player pool
Michael Grove	Pitcher	Los Angeles Dodgers player pool
Mike Kickham	Pitcher	Boston Red Sox
Landon Knack	Pitcher	Los Angeles Dodgers player pool
Nolan Long	Pitcher	N/A
Jose Martinez	Pitcher	N/A
Bobby Miller	Pitcher	Los Angeles Dodgers player pool
Brandon Morrow	Pitcher	Chicago Cubs injured list
Jimmy Nelson	Pitcher	Los Angeles Dodgers injured list
Robinson Ortiz	Pitcher	N/A
James Pazos	Pitcher	Colorado Rockies
Ryan Pepiot	Pitcher	Los Angeles Dodgers player pool
Nick Robertson	Pitcher	N/A
Enny Romero	Pitcher	N/A
Gus Varland	Pitcher	N/A
Kendall Williams	Pitcher	Los Angeles Dodgers player pool
Steve Berman	Catcher	N/A
Tim Federowicz	Catcher	Texas Rangers player pool
Hunter Feduccia	Catcher	N/A
Jacob Amaya	Infielder	Los Angeles Dodgers player pool
Andy Burns	Infielder	Toronto Blue Jays player pool
Michael Busch	Infielder	Los Angeles Dodgers player pool
Matt Davidson	Infielder	Cincinnati Reds
Omar Estevez	Infielder	Los Angeles Dodgers player pool
Kody Hoese	Infielder	Los Angeles Dodgers player pool
Devin Mann	Infielder	Los Angeles Dodgers player pool
Rangel Ravelo	Infielder	St. Louis Cardinals
Elliot Soto	Infielder	Los Angeles Angels
Miguel Vargas	Infielder	N/A
James Outman	Outfielder	N/A
Andy Pages	Outfielder	N/A

Spring training began for the 2021 Dodgers on February 17 when pitchers and catchers arrived at Camelback Ranch in Glendale, Arizona. Pitcher Jimmy Nelson, in camp on a minor league contract, impressed enough in spring training that he was added to the 40-man roster on March 25.

== Regular season ==
=== National League West ===
NL West
Team	W	L	Pct.	GB	Home	Road
San Francisco Giants	107	55	.660	—	54‍–‍27	53‍–‍28
Los Angeles Dodgers	106	56	.654	1	58‍–‍23	48‍–‍33
San Diego Padres	79	83	.488	28	45‍–‍36	34‍–‍47
Colorado Rockies	74	87	.460	32½	48‍–‍33	26‍–‍54
Arizona Diamondbacks	52	110	.321	55	32‍–‍49	20‍–‍61

=== National League Wild Card ===
Wild Card standings

Division leaders
Team	W	L	Pct.
San Francisco Giants	107	55	.660
Milwaukee Brewers	95	67	.586
Atlanta Braves	88	73	.547

Wild Card teams (Top 2 teams qualify for postseason)
Team	W	L	Pct.	GB
Los Angeles Dodgers	106	56	.654	+16
St. Louis Cardinals	90	72	.556	—
Cincinnati Reds	83	79	.512	7
Philadelphia Phillies	82	80	.506	8
San Diego Padres	79	83	.488	11
New York Mets	77	85	.475	13
Colorado Rockies	74	87	.460	15½
Chicago Cubs	71	91	.438	19
Miami Marlins	67	95	.414	23
Washington Nationals	65	97	.401	25
Pittsburgh Pirates	61	101	.377	29
Arizona Diamondbacks	52	110	.321	38

=== Record vs. opponents ===
NL Records

2021 National League record Source: MLB Standings Grid – 2021
Team	AZ	ATL	CHC	CIN	COL	LAD	MIA	MIL	NYM	PHI	PIT	SD	SF	STL	WSH	AL
Arizona	—	3–4	2–4	5–1	9–10	3–16	2–5	1–6	1–5	4–3	4–2	8–11	2–17	1–6	3–4	4–16
Atlanta	4–3	—	5–2	4–3	2–4	2–4	11–8	3–3	10–9	10–9	4–3	4–2	3–3	6–1	14–5	6–14
Chicago	4–2	2–5	—	8–11	3–3	4–3	1–5	4–15	4–3	2–5	14–5	5–1	1–6	9–10	4–3	6–14
Cincinnati	1–5	3–4	11–8	—	5–2	3–3	5–2	9–10	3–3	4–2	13–6	1–6	1–6	10–9	5–2	9–11
Colorado	10–9	4–2	3–3	2–5	—	6–13	4–2	2–5	2–5	5–2	4–2	11–8	4–15	3–4	4–2	10–10
Los Angeles	16–3	4–2	3–4	3–3	13–6	—	3–4	4–3	6–1	4–2	6–0	12–7	9–10	4–3	7–0	12–8
Miami	5–2	8–11	5–1	2–5	2–4	4–3	—	3–3	9–10	10–9	2–5	3–4	3–4	0–6	8–11	3–17
Milwaukee	6–1	3–3	15–4	10–9	5–2	3–4	3–3	—	4–2	2–5	14–5	5–2	4–3	8–11	5–1	8–12
New York	5–1	9–10	3–4	3–3	5–2	1–6	10–9	2–4	—	9–10	3–4	4–3	1–5	2–5	11–8	9–11
Philadelphia	3–4	9–10	5–2	2–4	2–5	2–4	9–10	5–2	10–9	—	4–3	4–2	2–4	4–3	13–6	8–12
Pittsburgh	2–4	3–4	5–14	6–13	2–4	0–6	5–2	5–14	4–3	3–4	—	3–4	4–3	7–12	2–4	10–10
San Diego	11–8	2–4	1–5	6–1	8–11	7–12	4–3	2–5	3–4	2–4	4–3	—	8–11	3–3	4–3	14–6
San Francisco	17–2	3–3	6–1	6–1	15–4	10–9	4–3	3–4	5–1	4–2	3–4	11–8	—	2–4	5–2	13–7
St. Louis	6–1	1–6	10–9	9–10	4–3	3–4	6–0	11–8	5–2	3–4	12–7	3–3	4–2	—	2–4	11–9
Washington	4–3	5–14	3–4	2–5	2–4	0–7	11–8	1–5	8–11	6–13	4–2	3–4	2–5	4–2	—	10–10

=== Game log ===
2021 Game Log: 106–56 (Home: 58–23; Away: 48–33)
April: 16–11 (Home: 8–5; Away: 8–6)

#	Date	Opponent	Score	Win	Loss	Save	Attendance	Record
1	April 1	@ Rockies	L 5–8	Gonzalez (1–0)	**Kershaw** (0–1)	Bard (1)	20,570	0–1
2	April 2	@ Rockies	**W** 11–6	**Bauer** (1–0)	Senzatela (0–1)	—	20,363	1–1
3	April 3	@ Rockies	**W** 6–5	**Treinen** (1–0)	Givens (0–1)	**Jansen** (1)	20,688	2–1
4	April 4	@ Rockies	**W** 4–2	**Urías** (1–0)	Gomber (0–1)	**Knebel** (1)	20,368	3–1
5	April 5	@ Athletics	**W** 10–3	**May** (1–0)	Montas (0–1)	—	6,653	4–1
6	April 6	@ Athletics	**W** 5–1	**Kershaw** (1–1)	Bassitt (0–2)	—	7,672	5–1
7	April 7	@ Athletics	L 3–4 (10)	Petit (1–0)	**Nelson** (0–1)	—	8,131	5–2
8	April 9	Nationals	**W** 1–0	**Buehler** (1–0)	Avilán (0–1)	**Knebel** (2)	15,036	6–2
9	April 10	Nationals	**W** 9–5	**Urías** (2–0)	Corbin (0–1)	—	15,021	7–2
10	April 11	Nationals	**W** 3–0	**Kershaw** (2–1)	Scherzer (0–1)	**Jansen** (2)	15,049	8–2
11	April 13	Rockies	**W** 7–0	**Bauer** (2–0)	Senzatela (1–2)	—	15,021	9–2
12	April 14	Rockies	**W** 4–2	**Knebel** (1–0)	Gray (1–1)	**Jansen** (3)	15,093	10–2
13	April 15	Rockies	**W** 7–5	**Nelson** (1–1)	Almonte (0–1)	**Price** (1)	15,129	11–2
14	April 16	@ Padres	**W** 11–6 (12)	**Price** (1–0)	Hill (0–2)	—	15,250	12–2
15	April 17	@ Padres	**W** 2–0	**Kershaw** (3–1)	Darvish (1–1)	**González** (1)	15,250	13–2
16	April 18	@ Padres	L 2–5	Kela (2–0)	**Alexander** (0–1)	Melancon (6)	15,250	13–3
17	April 19	@ Mariners	L 3–4	Sheffield (1–1)	**May** (1–1)	Montero (3)	8,999	13–4
18	April 20	@ Mariners	**W** 1–0	**Urías** (3–0)	Gonzales (1–2)	**Jansen** (4)	8,998	14–4
19	April 22	Padres	L 2–3	Crismatt (1–1)	**Treinen** (1–1)	Melancon (7)	15,167	14–5
20	April 23	Padres	L 1–6	Darvish (2–1)	**Kershaw** (3–2)	—	15,222	14–6
21	April 24	Padres	**W** 5–4	**Bauer** (3–0)	Johnson (0–1)	**Jansen** (5)	15,596	15–6
22	April 25	Padres	L 7–8 (11)	Hill (1–2)	**Cleavinger** (0–1)	Melancon (8)	15,316	15–7
23	April 26	Reds	L 3–5 (10)	Antone (1–0)	**Jansen** (0–1)	—	15,199	15–8
24	April 27	Reds	L 5–6	Hendrix (1–0)	**Alexander** (0–2)	Doolittle (1)	15,306	15–9
25	April 28	Reds	**W** 8–0	**Kershaw** (4–2)	Gray (0–2)	—	15,052	16–9
26	April 29	@ Brewers	L 1–2	Lauer (1–0)	**Bauer** (3–1)	Hader (6)	10,621	16–10
27	April 30	@ Brewers	L 1–3	Peralta (3–0)	**Uceta** (0–1)	Hader (7)	12,044	16–11

May: 16–11 (Home: 10–4; Away: 6–7)

#	Date	Opponent	Score	Win	Loss	Save	Attendance	Record
28	May 1	@ Brewers	L 5–6 (11)	Perdomo (1–0)	**Vesia** (0–1)	—	12,139	16–12
29	May 2	@ Brewers	**W** 16–4	**Urías** (4–0)	Bettinger (0–1)	—	12,130	17–12
—	May 3	@ Cubs	Postponed (Rain; Makeup: May 4)					
30	May 4 (1)	@ Cubs	L 1–7 (7)	Hendricks (2–3)	**Kershaw** (4–3)	—	10,295	17–13
31	May 4 (2)	@ Cubs	L 3–4 (9)	Steele (1–0)	**Cleavinger** (0–2)	—	10,343	17–14
32	May 5	@ Cubs	L 5–6 (11)	Mills (2–0)	**Cleavinger** (0–3)	—	10,343	17–15
33	May 7	@ Angels	L 2–9	Canning (3–2)	**Urías** (4–1)	Sandoval (1)	15,316	17–16
34	May 8	@ Angels	**W** 14–11	**Kershaw** (5–3)	Bundy (0–4)	**Treinen** (1)	15,274	18–16
35	May 9	@ Angels	L 1–2	Slegers (2–0)	**Bauer** (3–2)	Iglesias (5)	15,294	18–17
36	May 11	Mariners	**W** 6–4	**Cleavinger** (1–3)	Montero (3–2)	**Jansen** (6)	15,570	19–17
37	May 12	Mariners	**W** 7–1	**Urías** (5–1)	Dunn (1–1)	—	15,586	20–17
38	May 14	Marlins	**W** 9–6	**Kershaw** (6–3)	Alcántara (1–3)	**Jansen** (7)	15,915	21–17
39	May 15	Marlins	**W** 7–0	**Bauer** (4–2)	Holloway (1–2)	—	16,116	22–17
40	May 16	Marlins	L 2–3	López (1–3)	**Uceta** (0–2)	García (7)	15,976	22–18
41	May 17	Diamondbacks	**W** 3–1	**Buehler** (2–0)	Bumgarner (4–3)	**Jansen** (8)	14,088	23–18
42	May 18	Diamondbacks	**W** 9–1	**Urías** (6–1)	Martin (0–1)	—	15,313	24–18
43	May 19	Diamondbacks	**W** 4–2	**Kelly** (1–0)	Mantiply (0–1)	**Jansen** (9)	15,586	25–18
44	May 20	Diamondbacks	**W** 3–2	**González** (1–0)	Kelly (2–5)	**Jansen** (10)	16,105	26–18
45	May 21	@ Giants	**W** 2–1	**Bauer** (5–2)	Wood (5–1)	**Treinen** (2)	12,753	27–18
46	May 22	@ Giants	**W** 6–3	**Buehler** (3–0)	Kazmir (0–1)	**Jansen** (11)	13,660	28–18
47	May 23	@ Giants	**W** 11–5	**Urías** (7–1)	DeSclafani (4–2)	—	13,346	29–18
48	May 25	@ Astros	**W** 9–2	**Kershaw** (7–3)	Greinke (4–2)	—	34,443	30–18
49	May 26	@ Astros	L 2–5	García (3–3)	**Bauer** (5–3)	Abreu (1)	30,939	30–19
50	May 27	Giants	**W** 4–3	**González** (2–0)	Wood (5–2)	**Jansen** (12)	16,343	31–19
51	May 28	Giants	L 5–8 (10)	Rogers (1–0)	**Jansen** (0–2)	García (1)	17,873	31–20
52	May 29	Giants	L 6–11	Webb (4–3)	**Urías** (7–2)	—	19,097	31–21
53	May 30	Giants	L 4–5	Gausman (6–0)	**Kershaw** (7–4)	McGee (12)	18,155	31–22
54	May 31	Cardinals	**W** 9–4	**Bauer** (6–3)	Helsley (3–3)	—	18,071	32–22

June: 17–9 (Home: 10–4; Away: 7–5)

#	Date	Opponent	Score	Win	Loss	Save	Attendance	Record
55	June 1	Cardinals	L 2–3	Gallegos (3–1)	**Treinen** (1–2)	Reyes (16)	15,683	32–23
56	June 2	Cardinals	**W** 14–3	**Buehler** (4–0)	Martínez (3–5)	—	15,889	33–23
57	June 4	@ Braves	**W** 9–5	**Urías** (8–2)	Anderson (4–3)	—	40,514	34–23
58	June 5	@ Braves	L 4–6	Morton (5–2)	**Kershaw** (7–5)	Smith (10)	41,136	34–24
59	June 6	@ Braves	L 2–4	Fried (3–3)	**Bauer** (6–4)	Smith (11)	39,439	34–25
60	June 8	@ Pirates	**W** 5–3	**Buehler** (5–0)	Brubaker (4–5)	**Jansen** (13)	9,047	35–25
61	June 9	@ Pirates	**W** 2–1	**González** (3–0)	Anderson (3–6)	**Jansen** (14)	10,957	36–25
62	June 10	@ Pirates	**W** 6–3 (8)	**Urías** (9–2)	Keller (3–7)	**Bickford** (1)	9,396	37–25
63	June 11	Rangers	**W** 12–1	**Kershaw** (8–5)	Foltynewicz (1–7)	—	20,220	38–25
64	June 12	Rangers	L 1–12	Allard (2–2)	**Bauer** (6–5)	—	17,500	38–26
65	June 13	Rangers	**W** 5–3	**Buehler** (6–0)	Dunning (2–5)	**Jansen** (15)	15,508	39–26
66	June 14	Phillies	**W** 3–1	**Price** (2–0)	Howard (0–2)	**Jansen** (16)	15,761	40–26
67	June 15	Phillies	**W** 5–3	**Kelly** (2–0)	Suárez (2–1)	**Treinen** (3)	52,078	41–26
68	June 16	Phillies	L 0–2	Wheeler (5–3)	**Kershaw** (8–6)	Neris (10)	52,157	41–27
69	June 18	@ Diamondbacks	**W** 3–0	**Bauer** (7–5)	Mantiply (0–2)	**Jansen** (17)	25,356	42–27
70	June 19	@ Diamondbacks	**W** 9–3	**Buehler** (7–0)	Peacock (2–5)	—	29,904	43–27
71	June 20	@ Diamondbacks	**W** 9–8	**Cleavinger** (2–3)	Young (2–5)	**Jansen** (18)	31,661	44–27
72	June 21	@ Padres	L 2–6	Darvish (7–2)	**Urías** (9–3)	—	42,220	44–28
73	June 22	@ Padres	L 2–3	Snell (3–3)	**Kershaw** (8–7)	Melancon (22)	42,667	44–29
74	June 23	@ Padres	L 3–5	Hill (4–3)	**Treinen** (1–3)	Melancon (23)	43,691	44–30
75	June 24	Cubs	L 0–4	Davies (5–4)	**Buehler** (7–1)	—	52,175	44–31
76	June 25	Cubs	**W** 6–2	**Treinen** (2–3)	Tepera (0–1)	—	49,387	45–31
77	June 26	Cubs	**W** 3–2	**Price** (3–0)	Thompson (3–2)	—	45,420	46–31
78	June 27	Cubs	**W** 7–1	**Kershaw** (9–7)	Alzolay (4–7)	—	46,315	47–31
79	June 28	Giants	**W** 3–2	**Bauer** (8–5)	DeSclafani (8–3)	**Jansen** (19)	47,835	48–31
80	June 29	Giants	**W** 3–1	**Buehler** (8–1)	Gausman (8–2)	**Jansen** (20)	52,342	49–31

July: 14–12 (Home: 5–5; Away: 9–7)

#	Date	Opponent	Score	Win	Loss	Save	Attendance	Record
81	July 1	@ Nationals	**W** 6–2 (5)	**Gonsolin** (1–0)	Corbin (5–7)	—	21,285	50–31
82	July 2	@ Nationals	**W** 10–5	**Urías** (10–3)	Clay (0–1)	—	27,689	51–31
83	July 3	@ Nationals	**W** 5–3	**Graterol** (1–0)	Suero (0–2)	**Jansen** (21)	42,064	52–31
84	July 4	@ Nationals	**W** 5–1	**Price** (4–0)	Ross (5–8)	—	37,187	53–31
85	July 5	@ Marlins	L 4–5	Hess (1–0)	**González** (3–1)	Bender (1)	15,290	53–32
86	July 6	@ Marlins	L 1–2 (10)	Hess (2–0)	**Treinen** (2–4)	—	7,993	53–33
87	July 7	@ Marlins	L 6–9	Bender (1–0)	**Uceta** (0–3)	—	9,523	53–34
88	July 8	@ Marlins	**W** 6–1	**Urías** (11–3)	Alcántara (5–8)	—	12,031	54–34
89	July 9	Diamondbacks	L 2–5	de Geus (1–0)	**Nuñez** (0–1)	Soria (3)	49,215	54–35
90	July 10	Diamondbacks	**W** 22–1	**Buehler** (9–1)	Smith (2–6)	—	44,654	55–35
91	July 11	Diamondbacks	**W** 7–4	**Jansen** (1–2)	Bukauskas (1–2)	—	40,464	56–35
–	July 13	91st All-Star Game	American League vs. National League (Coors Field, Denver, Colorado)					
92	July 16	@ Rockies	**W** 10–4	**Urías** (12–3)	Gonzalez (3–6)	—	44,251	57–35
93	July 17	@ Rockies	**W** 9–2	**Buehler** (10–1)	Freeland (1–4)	—	48,245	58–35
94	July 18	@ Rockies	L 5–6 (10)	Givens (3–2)	**Bickford** (0–1)	—	35,513	58–36
95	July 19	Giants	L 2–7	García (2–2)	**Gonsolin** (1–1)	—	50,970	58–37
96	July 20	Giants	**W** 8–6	**Sherfy** (2–0)	Rogers (1–1)	—	42,344	59–37
97	July 21	Giants	L 2–4	Álvarez (3–1)	**Jansen** (1–3)	Rogers (11)	52,076	59–38
98	July 22	Giants	L 3–5	Álvarez (4–1)	**Jansen** (1–4)	McGee (20)	47,312	59–39
99	July 23	Rockies	L 6–9 (10)	Bard (5–5)	**Sherfy** (2–1)	Gilbreath (1)	43,730	59–40
100	July 24	Rockies	**W** 1–0	**Gonsolin** (2–1)	Freeland (1–5)	**Jansen** (22)	42,245	60–40
101	July 25	Rockies	**W** 3–2	**Bickford** (1–1)	Estévez (2–2)	**Kelly** (1)	42,621	61–40
102	July 27	@ Giants	L 1–2	Rogers (2–1)	**Treinen** (2–5)	McGee (21)	32,878	61–41
103	July 28	@ Giants	**W** 8–0	**Buehler** (11–1)	DeSclafani (10–5)	—	33,728	62–41
104	July 29	@ Giants	L 0–5	Cueto (7–5)	**Price** (4–1)	—	35,136	62–42
105	July 30	@ Diamondbacks	L 5–6 (10)	Peacock (4–6)	**Nelson** (1–2)	—	20,780	62–43
106	July 31	@ Diamondbacks	**W** 8–3	**Vesia** (1–1)	Kelly (7–8)	—	23,814	63–43

August: 21–6 (Home: 12–5; Away: 9–1)

#	Date	Opponent	Score	Win	Loss	Save	Attendance	Record
107	August 1	@ Diamondbacks	**W** 13–0	**Urías** (13–3)	Smith (3–8)	—	17,195	64–43
108	August 3	Astros	L 0–3	McCullers Jr. (9–2)	**Buehler** (11–2)	Stanek (2)	52,692	64–44
109	August 4	Astros	**W** 7–5	**Scherzer** (9–4)	Odorizzi (4–6)	—	52,724	65–44
110	August 6	Angels	L 3–4 (10)	Warren (1–0)	**Cleavinger** (2–4)	Iglesias (24)	50,822	65–45
111	August 7	Angels	**W** 5–3	**Graterol** (2–0)	Guerra (2–2)	**Jansen** (23)	50,808	66–45
112	August 8	Angels	**W** 8–2	**Buehler** (12–2)	Detmers (0–2)	—	46,982	67–45
113	August 10	@ Phillies	**W** 5–0	**Vesia** (2–1)	Hammer (1–1)	—	28,333	68–45
114	August 11	@ Phillies	**W** 8–2	**Graterol** (3–0)	Gibson (8–4)	—	32,186	69–45
115	August 12	@ Phillies	L 1–2	Bradley (7–1)	**White** (0–1)	Kennedy (19)	26,122	69–46
116	August 13	@ Mets	**W** 6–5 (10)	**Jansen** (2–4)	Familia (6–3)	—	38,395	70–46
117	August 14	@ Mets	**W** 2–1 (10)	**Bickford** (2–1)	Díaz (0–2)	**Knebel** (3)	38,669	71–46
118	August 15	@ Mets	**W** 14–4	**Scherzer** (10–4)	Carrasco (0–1)	—	31,205	72–46
119	August 16	Pirates	**W** 2–1	**Treinen** (3–5)	Shreve (1–1)	**Jansen** (24)	48,005	73–46
120	August 17	Pirates	**W** 4–3	**Knebel** (2–0)	Ponce (0–3)	**Jansen** (25)	53,114	74–46
121	August 18	Pirates	**W** 9–0	**White** (1–1)	Brubaker (4–13)	—	52,140	75–46
122	August 19	Mets	**W** 4–1	**Phillips** (1–0)	Walker (7–8)	**Treinen** (4)	42,133	76–46
123	August 20	Mets	**W** 3–2	**Buehler** (13–2)	Carrasco (0–2)	**Jansen** (26)	48,117	77–46
124	August 21	Mets	**W** 4–3	**Scherzer** (11–4)	Hill (6–5)	**Jansen** (27)	44,783	78–46
125	August 22	Mets	L 2–7	Stroman (9–12)	**Price** (4–2)	—	52,749	78–47
126	August 24	@ Padres	**W** 5–2	**Urías** (14–3)	Johnson (3–3)	**Jansen** (28)	41,676	79–47
127	August 25	@ Padres	**W** 5–3 (16)	**Knebel** (3–0)	Camarena (0–1)	**Greene** (1)	41,765	80–47
128	August 26	@ Padres	**W** 4–0	**Scherzer** (12–4)	Darvish (7–8)	—	43,383	81–47
129	August 27	Rockies	L 2–4	Freeland (5–6)	**Jackson** (0–1)	Estévez (3)	40,100	81–48
130	August 28	Rockies	**W** 5–2	**Treinen** (4–5)	Bard (7–7)	**Jansen** (29)	42,479	82–48
131	August 29	Rockies	L 0–5	Senzatela (3–9)	**White** (1–2)	—	37,569	82–49
132	August 30	Braves	**W** 5–3	**Urías** (15–3)	Smyly (9–4)	**Treinen** (5)	49,410	83–49
133	August 31	Braves	**W** 3–2	**Treinen** (5–5)	Matzek (0–4)	**Jansen** (30)	44,952	84–49

September: 19–7 (Home: 10–0; Away: 9–7)

#	Date	Opponent	Score	Win	Loss	Save	Attendance	Record
134	September 1	Braves	**W** 4–3	**Bickford** (3–1)	Martin (2–4)	**Kelly** (2)	47,473	85–49
135	September 3	@ Giants	L 2–3 (11)	García (6–3)	**Phillips** (1–1)	—	39,338	85–50
136	September 4	@ Giants	**W** 6–1	**Urías** (16–3)	Jackson (2–1)	—	41,146	86–50
137	September 5	@ Giants	L 4–6	Littell (2–0)	**Buehler** (13–3)	—	41,155	86–51
138	September 6	@ Cardinals	**W** 5–1	**Scherzer** (13–4)	Mikolas (0–2)	—	43,575	87–51
139	September 7	@ Cardinals	**W** 7–2	**Vesia** (3–1)	Happ (8–8)	—	34,500	88–51
140	September 8	@ Cardinals	L 4–5	Wainwright (15–7)	**White** (1–3)	Gallegos (5)	35,566	88–52
141	September 9	@ Cardinals	L 1–2	Reyes (6–8)	**Bickford** (3–2)	Gallegos (6)	31,173	88–53
142	September 10	Padres	**W** 3–0	**Urías** (17–3)	Musgrove (10–9)	**Jansen** (31)	48,403	89–53
143	September 11	Padres	**W** 5–4	**Buehler** (14–3)	Paddack (7–7)	**Jansen** (32)	46,969	90–53
144	September 12	Padres	**W** 8–0	**Scherzer** (14–4)	Lamet (3–3)	—	42,637	91–53
145	September 13	Diamondbacks	**W** 5–1	**Bickford** (4–2)	Gallen (2–10)	—	43,273	92–53
146	September 14	Diamondbacks	**W** 8–4	**Gonsolin** (3–1)	Weaver (3–5)	—	44,630	93–53
147	September 15	Diamondbacks	**W** 5–3	**Urías** (18–3)	Kelly (7–10)	**Jansen** (33)	46,520	94–53
148	September 17	@ Reds	L 1–3	Castillo (8–15)	**Buehler** (14–4)	Lorenzen (4)	28,926	94–54
149	September 18	@ Reds	**W** 5–1	**Scherzer** (15–4)	Gray (7–8)	**Jansen** (34)	29,861	95–54
150	September 19	@ Reds	**W** 8–5	**Kershaw** (10–7)	Miley (12–7)	—	26,621	96–54
151	September 21	@ Rockies	**W** 5–4 (10)	**Jansen** (3–4)	Chacín (3–2)	**Vesia** (1)	23,869	97–54
152	September 22	@ Rockies	L 5–10	Stephenson (2–1)	**Bruihl** (0–1)	—	27,013	97–55
153	September 23	@ Rockies	**W** 7–5 (10)	**Jansen** (4–4)	Gilbreath (2–2)	**Treinen** (6)	22,356	98–55
154	September 24	@ Diamondbacks	**W** 4–2	**Gonsolin** (4–1)	Castellanos (2–2)	**Jansen** (35)	19,001	99–55
155	September 25	@ Diamondbacks	L 2–7	Gallen (3–10)	**Kershaw** (10–8)	—	28,026	99–56
156	September 26	@ Diamondbacks	**W** 3–0	**Urías** (19–3)	Mejía (0–3)	**Jansen** (36)	16,648	100–56
157	September 28	Padres	**W** 2–1	**Buehler** (15–4)	Darvish (8–11)	**Treinen** (7)	52,128	101–56
158	September 29	Padres	**W** 11–9	**Price** (5–2)	Pagán (4–3)	**Jansen** (37)	45,366	102–56
159	September 30	Padres	**W** 8–3	**Knebel** (4–0)	Velasquez (3–9)	—	52,550	103–56

October: 3–0 (Home: 3–0; Away: 0–0)

#	Date	Opponent	Score	Win	Loss	Save	Attendance	Record
160	October 1	Brewers	**W** 8–6	**Treinen** (6–5)	Gustave (1–2)	**Jansen** (38)	51,388	104–56
161	October 2	Brewers	**W** 8–3	**Urías** (20–3)	Burnes (11–5)	—	49,705	105–56
162	October 3	Brewers	**W** 10–3	**Buehler** (16–4)	Ashby (3–2)	**Jackson** (1)	43,170	106–56

Legend: = Win = Loss = Postponement
Bold = Dodgers team member

=== Opening day ===
Opening Day starters
Name	Position
Mookie Betts	Right fielder
Corey Seager	Shortstop
Justin Turner	Third baseman
Cody Bellinger	Center fielder
Max Muncy	First baseman
Chris Taylor	Left fielder
Gavin Lux	Second baseman
Austin Barnes	Catcher
Clayton Kershaw	Starting pitcher

=== Season summary ===
==== April ====
The Dodgers began their 2021 season with a four-game series against the Colorado Rockies at Coors Field. Clayton Kershaw made his team-best ninth Opening day start on April 1. Chris Owings had three hits in three at-bats, including a triple as the Rockies won the opener, 8–5. The Dodgers got back in the game by winning the following day, 11–6. New Dodger pitcher Trevor Bauer kept the Rockies hitless through six innings before running into problems in the seventh and turning it over to the bullpen. The next game the Dodgers won, 6–5, with the key play an inside the park homer by Zach McKinstry. Julio Urías allowed one run on three hits in a career best seven innings to round out the series with a 4–2 win. The Dodgers traveled west for a three-game interleague series against the Oakland Athletics at RingCentral Coliseum. Dustin May pitched six scoreless innings while Corey Seager and McKinstry each had three RBIs as the Dodgers won 10–3 in the series opener. In the second game, Kershaw pitched seven quality innings, allowing one run and striking out eight batters while Edwin Ríos, Max Muncy, and Mookie Betts each hit a home run in the Dodgers 5–1 win. Bauer allowed only two runs on two hits while striking out 10 in 6 2/3 innings in the next game, but the Athletics tied the game in the ninth off Kenley Jansen and then won in 10 innings on a walk-off RBI single by Mitch Moreland, 4–3.

The Dodgers faced the Washington Nationals in the home opener at Dodger Stadium on April 9. Walker Buehler struck out four in six scoreless innings and Justin Turner hit a solo home run that accounted for all the scoring in the Dodgers 1–0 win. The Dodgers scored five runs in the second inning to pull ahead in the next game and held on to win 9–5. In the series finale, Kershaw pitched six scoreless innings while McKinstry drove in all three turns in the Dodgers 3–0 victory to sweep the Nationals in the weekend three-game series. The Dodgers next hosted the Rockies for a three-game home series. In the series opener, Bauer pitched seven scoreless innings with nine strikeouts and only one hit allowed while Seager, Betts, Muncy and Chris Taylor each hit a home run in the 7–0 win. In the second game of the series, Turner homered and drove in two runs while McKinstry also hit a home run as the Dodgers won 4–2 to become the first team in the Majors to win 10 games. In the series finale, Turner and Muncy each hit three run home runs to sweep the Rockies 7–5.

On April 16, the Dodgers traveled to play the San Diego Padres for a three-game series at Petco Park. In the series opener, both teams battled to extra innings until the Dodgers scored five runs (including a two-run homer by Seager) to break the tie in the 12th inning to edge the Padres 11–6. Luke Raley hit his first career home run in the fifth inning. Kershaw, engaged in a pitchers' duel with Yu Darvish in the following game, pitched six scoreless innings with eight strikeouts and drew a bases-loaded walk in the fifth inning. That was the only run scored off Darvish, who allowed only one hit while striking out nine in seven innings. Turner added a solo home run in the ninth and the Dodgers shut out the Padres 2–0. In the finale of the series, Bauer allowed only one run over six innings while striking out seven, becoming just the third Dodgers pitcher to record seven or more strikeouts in his first four games with the club. A two-run homer by Chris Taylor put the Dodgers up in the second inning but the bullpen faltered and gave up three runs in the eighth to hand the Padres a 5–2 win and end the Dodgers eight game winning streak. The Dodgers next played the Seattle Mariners in a two-game interleague series at T-Mobile Park, dropping the opener 4–3 from runs driven in by José Marmolejos and Taylor Trammell. Urías struck out a career high 11 while allowing only one hit in seven innings as the Dodgers shut out the Mariners, 1–0, thanks to an RBI single by Seager to split the series. The two teams combined for three hits in game two, tying the record for the fewest in an interleague game set by the Red Sox and Expos in 1997.

The Dodgers returned home on April 22 for a four-game series with the Padres. Buehler allowed two runs in seven innings with nine strikeouts but Ryan Weathers held the Dodgers scoreless in his 5 2/3 innings while allowing only one hit. The Dodgers tied the game in the bottom of the seventh with back-to-back homers by A. J. Pollock and Sheldon Neuse but the Padres got a late run to take the opener, 3–2. In the next game, Kershaw allowed three runs while striking out seven in seven innings, including two home runs by Fernando Tatís Jr. The Dodgers offense struggled again, as they only recorded four hits, and the 23 they had over the last six games was their lowest total over a six game span since the 1909 season as the Padres won the game 6–1. Tatís Jr. hit two more home runs in the next game, this time off Bauer, but the Dodgers rallied for three runs in the sixth inning and won the game 5–4. In the last game of the series, Dustin May allowed only one run while striking out 10 in six innings and the Dodgers jumped out to a 7–1 lead only to see the bullpen self destruct and the Padres won in 11 innings, 8–7. The Cincinnati Reds were the Dodgers next opponent for a three-game series and the Dodgers dropped another extra inning game, falling 5–3 in 10 innings when Jesse Winker hit a two-run home run off Jansen. The Reds beat the Dodgers again the next day, 6–5. making their first three game losing streak since August 29–30, 2019. Kershaw struck out eight in seven scoreless innings and the Dodgers offense scored six runs in the eighth inning to roll to an 8–0 win in the series finale.

The Dodgers went back on the road for a four-game series against the Milwaukee Brewers at American Family Field. Bauer pitched a complete game, allowing only two runs on a fourth inning home run by Travis Shaw. However, the Dodgers only scored one run and lost 2–1. Edwin Uceta made his MLB debut as the starting pitcher on April 30, allowing two runs (on a home run by Jackie Bradley Jr.) and four hits in two innings. The Dodgers offense continued to struggle, getting only two hits (one of them a home run by A.J. Pollock) and they lost 3–1.

==== May ====
The Dodgers continued their struggles as the month of May began, starting pitcher Dustin May exited the game in the second inning with an army injury and the Brewers beat the Dodgers 6–5 in 11 innings. Julio Urías allowed only one run on four hits with 10 strikeouts in the conclusion of the series, and the Dodgers avoided being swept with a 16–4 win. A. J. Pollock hit a grand slam in the first inning and Matt Beaty hit one in the second. They were the first pair to hit grand slams in the first two innings since Bill Buckner and Tony Armas of the 1984 Boston Red Sox. Pollock later added a second home run and finished with eight RBI and Beaty had seven. It was the first time one team had two players with seven or more RBI in a single game since the 1944 New York Giants. The Dodgers next started a three game series against the Chicago Cubs at Wrigley Field. The opener on May 3 was rained out so they had to play a doubleheader of seven inning games on May 4. In the early game, Clayton Kershaw struggled and had the shortest start of his career, only one inning, in a game the Dodgers lost, 7–1. Despite home runs by Justin Turner and Max Muncy, the Dodgers also lost the second game of the doubleheader, 4–3, in nine innings. The Cubs completed the sweep of the Dodgers with a 6–5 win in 11 innings, the first time the Dodgers had been swept in a series of three or more games since April 2019 against the Cardinals. The next stop for the struggling team was Angel Stadium for a three-game series against the Los Angeles Angels, where they got blown out in the first game, 9–2, extending the losing streak to four games. The Dodgers offense finally woke up in the next game, scoring eight runs in the fourth inning and five runs in the fifth to build a 13–0 lead, which turned out to be enough to overcome a massive bullpen collapse and the Dodgers snapped the losing streak with a 14–11 win. Kershaw pitched five scoreless innings, the 84th scoreless start of his career, sixth most in MLB history. However, they went back into hibernation in the series finale, losing 2–1 to the Angels to drop the series.

The Dodgers returned home on May 11 to start a short two-game series against the Seattle Mariners. Walker Buehler allowed four runs in seven innings (including two home runs by Mitch Haniger) and struck out eight. The Dodgers came from behind with two runs in the seventh and four in the eighth (including a go-ahead three-run homer by Gavin Lux) to win 6–4. They finished off the sweep with a 7–1 victory in the next game. Urías only allowed two hits in seven innings while striking out six. After an off day, the Dodgers faced the Miami Marlins for a three-game weekend series, starting with a 9–6 win, highlighted by an eight run second inning. Trevor Bauer struck out 10 batters while allowing only two hits in seven scoreless innings in the next game as the Dodgers won 7–0. The game was marred however by the news that Corey Seager broke his right hand when he was hit by a pitch in the fifth inning. A three-run home run by Adam Duvall in the fifth inning was all the Marlins needed in a 3–2 victory in the series finale. The Dodgers would finish the homestand with a four-game series with the Arizona Diamondbacks. Buehler struck out seven while only allowing one hit in seven scoreless innings and the Dodgers won the opener 3–1. Will Smith homered and newly signed Albert Pujols drove in a run in his second at-bat with the team. Urías struck out eight in 6 2/3 innings and Gavin Lux hit a grand slam as the Dodgers routed the Diamondbacks, 9–1, in the second game. The following day, Kershaw struck out eight in six innings and the Dodgers rode a three-run seventh inning to a 4–2 victory. In the final day of the series, Pujols hit his first home run in a Dodger uniform and Will Smith hit a go-ahead homer in the bottom of the seventh as the Dodgers went on to win 3–2 and sweep the series.

The Dodgers traveled up for a three-game weekend series at Oracle Park against the San Francisco Giants. Bauer struck out 11 while allowing only two hits and one unearned run in 6 1/3 innings and Chris Taylor hit a two run homer as the Dodgers won 2–1. The Dodgers took the next game, 6–3, thanks to home runs by Max Muncy and Austin Barnes and seven strong innings by Buehler. The Dodgers finished off the sweep with an 11–5 win which included Lux's second grand slam of the week. The Dodgers made a quick two-game trip to Minute Maid Park to play the Houston Astros. The Dodgers took the first game, 9–2, thanks to 7 2/3 innings from Kershaw, Justin Turner's eighth home run of the season and five two out RBIs. The winning streak came to an end on May 26 when the Astros won, 5–2. Bauer allowed two home runs in six innings of work.

The Dodgers returned home to face the Giants in a four-game series. In the series opener, they hit three home runs, including a go-ahead shot by Muncy in the sixth inning to win, 4–3. The Dodgers came from behind in the next game, with Austin Barnes hitting a three-run home run in the ninth inning to tie the game, only to lose in 10 innings, 8–5. The Giants took the following game as well, 11–6, as Urías struggled, allowing a career high seven runs on 11 hits in five innings. The Giants won the final game of the series, 5–4, as Kevin Gausman held the Dodgers to only two hits in six innings while striking out seven. The Dodgers ended the month with a Memorial Day contest against the St. Louis Cardinals. Gavin Lux hit two home runs and Chris Taylor added one of his own as well as a three-run double (to conclude a 14-pitch at-bat) as they won, 9–4.

==== June ====
To begin June, the Cardinals beat the Dodgers, 3–2, on Edmundo Sosa's go-ahead single in the ninth inning. Matt Beaty's two run homer accounted for all the Dodgers scoring. On June 2, the Dodgers scored 11 runs in the first inning en route to a 14–3 win. Cody Bellinger hit a grand slam and tied a club record with six first inning RBI's.

Next, the Dodgers traveled to play the Atlanta Braves in a three-game series at Truist Park. The series started with a 9–5 win for the Dodgers, with eight of the runs scoring in the fifth inning. However, the Braves scored five runs in the third inning of the following game to beat the Dodgers, 6–4. The Braves also won the series finale, 4–2. Next up for the Dodgers was a three-game series at PNC Park against the Pittsburgh Pirates. Walker Buehler allowed only two hits in seven scoreless innings and Chris Taylor homered as the Dodgers won the opener, 5–3. In the next game, Justin Turner's two solo home runs accounted for all the offense in the Dodgers 2–1 victory. The Dodgers finished off a sweep of the Pirates with a 6–3 win in a game that was shortened to eight innings because of weather.

On June 11, the Dodgers returned home for a weekend interleague series with the Texas Rangers. They began the series with a 12–1 blow out victory, of which six runs were scored in the first inning (including home runs by Max Muncy, Gavin Lux and Turner.) Clayton Kershaw struck out nine batters in six innings while allowing only three hits and one unearned run. In the next game, the Rangers turned the tables and produced a 12–1 rout of the Dodgers to even the series. Zach McKinstry had three hits and two RBI and Mookie Betts homered as the Dodgers took the series finale, 5–3. The next series for the Dodgers was a three game series against the Philadelphia Phillies. The Dodgers took the series opener, 3–1 thanks to a 2–run home run by Will Smith and a solo home run by Taylor. A go-ahead homer by Betts in the seventh inning carried the Dodgers to a 5–3 victory over the Phillies in the following game. It was the first game of the season with a full capacity crowd at Dodger Stadium, after the lifting of COVID-19 restrictions in Los Angeles. Clayton Kershaw struck out nine in six innings in the finale of the series, but the two runs he allowed (one on a first inning homer by Rhys Hoskins) were the only runs of the game as the Phillies won 2–0. This was the first game the Dodgers had been shut out since September 14, 2019.

On the next road trip, the Dodgers played the Arizona Diamondbacks at Chase Field. Trevor Bauer struck out eight batters in seven scoreless innings and Steven Souza Jr. homered as the Dodgers won 3–0. Buehler took a no-hitter into the eighth inning and struck out 11 while Will Smith and Chris Taylor homered in the Dodgers 9–3 victory on Juneteenth. With the game, Buehler tied Kirby Higbe for the most consecutive regular season starts by a Dodgers pitcher without a loss (23). In the final game of the series, the Dodgers scored five runs in the third inning, which included a three-run homer by Albert Pujols, and built a 9–1 lead. The bullpen collapsed in the eighth inning and let the Diamondbacks get back into the game but Kenley Jansen shut down the side in the ninth to preserve a 9–8 win.

Up next for the Dodgers was a three-game series at Petco Park against the San Diego Padres. Julio Urías struggled in the game as the Padres scored four runs on him before he recorded an out in the first inning, and he allowed six runs overall while Yu Darvish only allowed one run while striking out 11 in the Padres 6–2 win. The Padres pitching, led by five shutout innings from Blake Snell, held the Dodgers down again in the following game which the Padres won 3–2. The Padres won again in the conclusion of the series, 5–3, being swept at Petco Park for the first time since the 2010 season.

On June 24, the Dodgers returned home for a four game series against the Chicago Cubs. In the opener, four Cubs pitchers (Zach Davies, Ryan Tepera, Andrew Chafin, and Craig Kimbrel) combined to no-hit the Dodgers and Buehler lost his first game of the season, as the Cubs won 4–0. A. J. Pollock and Max Muncy each hit two run home runs in the eighth inning of the next game, as the Dodgers beat the Cubs, 6–2, to snap the losing streak. A walk-off home run by Cody Bellinger gave the Dodgers a 3–2 win the following day. Kershaw struck out 13 batters while allowing only one run on four hits in eight innings in the series finale, while the offense scored six runs in the second inning on a Zach McKinstry grand slam and a two-run homer by Bellinger. The Dodgers won the game 7–1. The Dodgers closed out the month with a short two-game series against the division leading San Francisco Giants. They won the first game, 3–2, thanks to a strong performance by Bauer and three solo home runs (by Betts, Muncy and Smith). They won again the next day, 3–1, to finish the month on a five game winning streak. Buehler struck out seven in 6 2/3 innings while allowing only one unearned run and Muncy homered in the game.

==== July ====
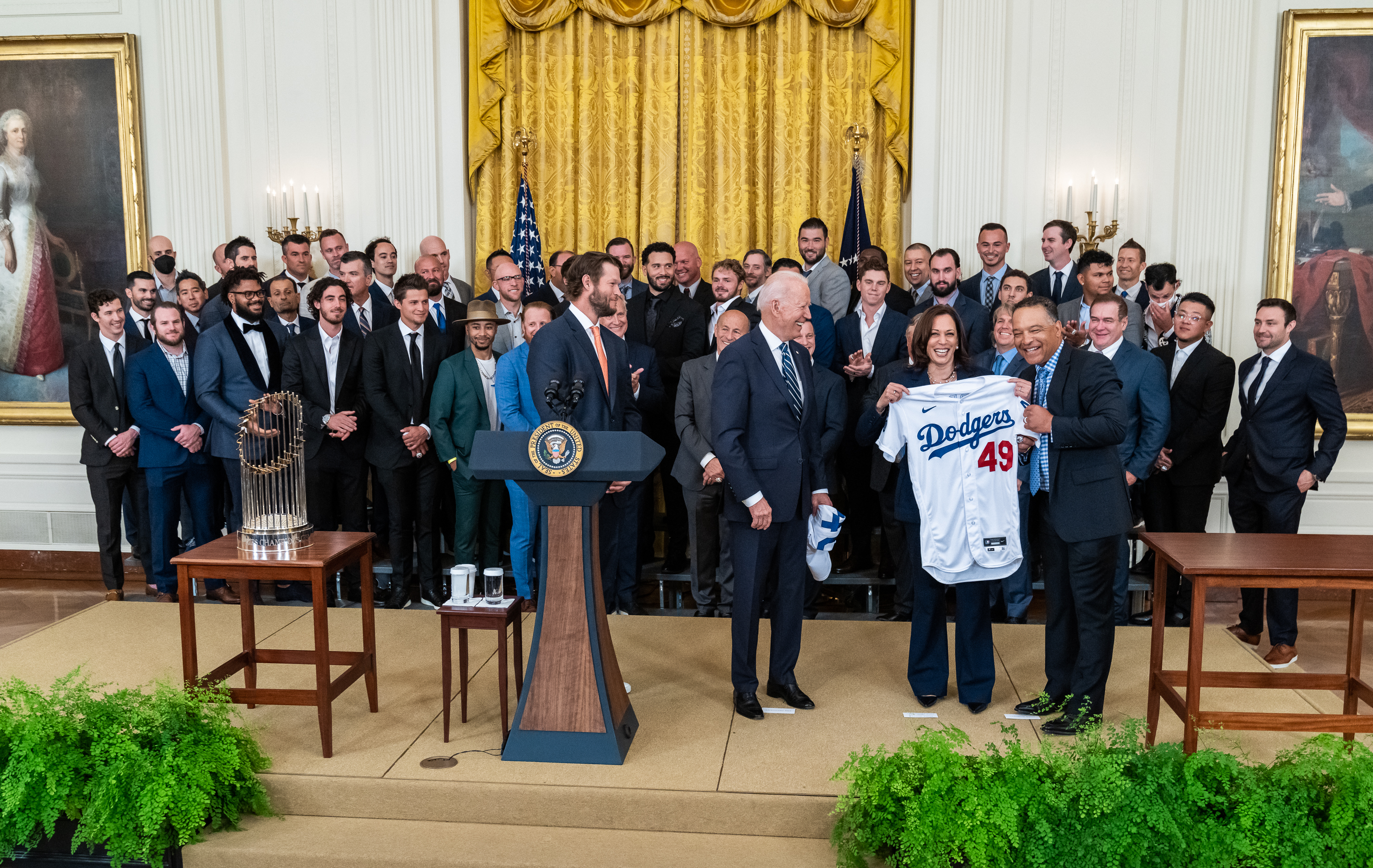
Los Angeles Dodgers at the White House on 2 July 2021.

The Dodgers began the month of July with a four-game road trip against the Washington Nationals at Nationals Park. The first game of the series was called after five innings because of rain but the Dodgers won 6–2 thanks to a grand slam by Max Muncy in the top of the fifth. The Dodgers scored nine runs in the seventh inning the following day as part of a 10–5 win. The Dodgers extended the winning streak to eight with a 5–3 win in game three of the series, despite an almost two hour rain delay in the middle innings. The Dodgers finished off the sweep with a 5–1 win on the 4th of July. Matt Beaty homered and Muncy doubled twice and drove in three runs. They then began a four-game series at loanDepot Park against the Miami Marlins. The Marlins ended the Dodgers winning streak with a 5–4 win in the opener, on a Jorge Alfaro homer in the eighth inning. The Marlins won again the next day, 2–1, in 10 innings with the winning run scoring on a wild pitch by Blake Treinen and a throwing error on Will Smith. A walk-off home run by Jesús Aguilar gave the Marlins their third straight win in the series, 9–6. The Dodges avoided being swept with a 6–1 win over the Marlins to end the road trip. Julio Urías struck out nine in seven innings while allowing only one run on five hits.

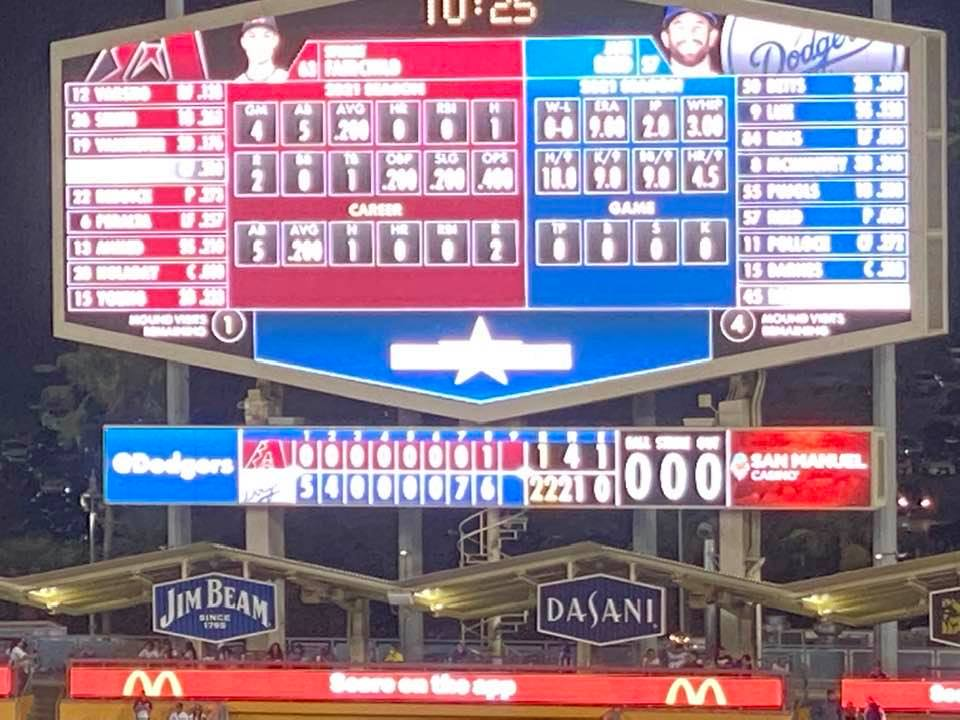
Dodgers set a new Dodger Stadium record by scoring 22 runs against the Diamondbacks on July 10.

The Dodgers ended the first half of the season with a three-game homestand against the Arizona Diamondbacks. They dropped the opener 5–2 as the offense struggled and the defense committed two costly errors. On July 10, the Dodgers tied an LA franchise record and set a new Dodger Stadium record by scoring 22 runs in a 22–1 blowout victory. Justin Turner and Mookie Betts each hit grand slams making the Dodgers the first team in MLB history to record a pair of two-slam games in a season, while A. J. Pollock and Albert Pujols each hit two homers in the game. Walker Buehler struck out seven in six scoreless innings. The Dodgers headed into the break with a 7–4 walk-off victory over the Diamondbacks as Muncy hit a three-run homer to end the game. Betts had three hits, including a homer in the game.

Five Dodgers players (Betts, Muncy, Buehler, Turner and Chris Taylor) were selected to represent the National League at the 2021 Major League Baseball All-Star Game on July 13.

The Dodgers followed the break with a three-game road series against the Colorado Rockies at Coors Field. They put up five runs in the first inning of the first game, with the big blow being a three-run homer by Taylor and went on to a 10–4 victory. Betts had four hits in four at-bats in the next game, with a home run and three doubles as the Dodgers won going away, 9–2. In the finale of the series, Turner and Smith both homered but the Dodgers lost in 10 innings, 6–5, after blowing saves in both the ninth and tenth.

The Dodgers returned home on July 19 to begin a four-game series against the division leading San Francisco Giants. Each team hit two home runs in the first inning (Buster Posey and Wilmer Flores for the Giants and Muncy and Turner for the Dodgers) but the Giants went on to win the game, 7–2, to extend their lead in the division. The Dodgers won the next game, 8–6, on a walk-off three-run home run by Will Smith. He was the first Dodgers player to hit a walk-off homer against the Giants, with the Dodgers trailing, since Roy Campanella on May 27, 1953. It was the other way around in the next game, with Wilmer Flores hitting a go-ahead two-run homer off Kenley Jansen in the top of the ninth inning as the Giants scored three runs off Jansen to win 4–2. In the final game of the series, Buehler struck out nine and only allowed one run in 7 1/3 innings but the Giants again came back against Jansen in the ninth to score four runs and win 5–3. The Dodgers lost another late inning lead the following day, and dropped the first game of a three-game series against the Rockies, 9–6, in 10 innings. The Dodgers snapped their losing streak with a 1–0 win over the Rockies on July 24. Tony Gonsolin allowed only two hits in 5 1/3 innings while striking out seven while Austin Barnes solo homer was the only run scored in the game. After blowing three saves in a row, Jansen pitched a scoreless ninth inning in this one. The Dodgers took the series finale, 3–2, thanks to two homers by Chris Taylor and one by Will Smith.

The Dodgers went back on the road on July 27 for a three-game series against the Giants at Oracle Park. They dropped the opener, 2–1, with the deciding run scoring on a throwing error by Cody Bellinger in the eighth inning. The Dodgers rebounded with an 8–0 shutout victory over the Giants thanks to Walker Buehler, who struck out eight in seven shutout innings. Bellinger hit the only homerun of the game. The Giants shut out the Dodgers, 5–0, to take the series. Next up was a three-game series against the Diamondbacks at Chase Field. Chris Taylor had a homer and a triple in the opener but the Dodgers lost 6–5 in 10 innings. The Dodgers took the next game, 8–3, with Justin Turner hitting a tie-breaking two-run homer as part of a four-run seventh inning.

==== August ====
The Dodgers ended the road trip with a 13–0 rout of the Diamondbacks on August 1. Mookie Betts and Justin Turner homered in the game while Julio Urías struck out seven in five scoreless innings.

The Dodgers returned home for a two-game homestand against the Houston Astros and were shut out in the first game, 3–0. In the next game, Max Scherzer made his Dodgers debut after having been acquired in a trade with the Washington Nationals the previous week. He struck out 10 in seven innings while allowing two runs on five hits and a walk. The Dodgers hit four home runs in the game, including two by Betts, and won 7–5. They began a three-game weekend series against the Los Angeles Angels with a 4–3 loss in 10 innings, their 11th consecutive extra inning loss on the season. In the next game, the Dodgers came from behind to win 5–3 thanks to a game-tying home run by Cody Bellinger in the seventh and a go-ahead two-run double by Chris Taylor in the eighth. The Dodgers finished off the series with an 8–2 win. Walker Buehler struck out eight in six innings and Albert Pujols and Bellinger homered in the win.

The Dodgers went on a road trip to play the Philadelphia Phillies at Citizens Bank Park. In the opening game of that series, they weathered a one hour, 44-minute rain delay, to win a 5–0 shutout. Corey Seager and Max Muncy homered in the game. Bellinger hit two home runs in the next game, as the Dodgers beat the Phillies 8–2. The Phillies won the final game of the series, 2–1, with one of the runs scored on a solo homer by Bryce Harper in the first. Next up was three games against the New York Mets at Citi Field. The Dodgers jumped out to a 4–0 lead only to see the bullpen falter and send the game into extra innings. However, they won the game 6–5 thanks to a two-run home run by Will Smith in the 10th inning, snapping the extra inning losing streak. In the next game, Buehler allowed only one run while striking out 10 in seven innings while Smith homered again. The Dodgers won in 10 innings for a second straight night, 2–1, on a run scoring double by Bellinger. The Dodgers finished off the road trip with a 14–4 rout and a sweep of the Mets. They hit five homers in the game, including two by Max Muncy. Trea Turner had three hits in four at-bats and scored four runs.

Andre Jackson pitched four scoreless innings with five strikeouts in his major league debut and the Dodgers got solo homers from Muncy and Billy McKinney to beat the Pittsburgh Pirates 2–1 at Dodger Stadium on August 16. Matt Beaty drove in the go-ahead runs with a two run double in the fifth leading the Dodgers to a 4–3 win over the Pirates in the second game of the series. In the following game, Mitch White pitched 7 1/3 scoreless innings with six strikeouts and allowed only two hits while the Dodgers hit four home runs (including two by Muncy) in a 9–0 blowout victory. The next day, the Mets arrived in town for a four-game series and the Dodgers continued the winning streak with a 4–1 win. Buehler struck out eight in 7 2/3 innings as the Dodgers edged the Mets 3–2 for their eighth straight win on August 20. The Dodgers took the third game of the series, 4–3. Trea Turner had three hits including a home run and Pujols and Chris Taylor also homered. The winning streak came to an end in the next game, when the Mets avoided the sweep with a 7–2 win.

Up next was a brief three-game road trip against the San Diego Padres at Petco Park. Julio Urías returned from a short stint on the injured list to allow only one hit in five scoreless innings while Smith homered and the Dodgers won 5–2. In the following game, Buehler struck out eight in 6 2/3 innings while allowing only one unearned run but he was matched by Blake Snell who struck out 10 in 7 2/3 innings. The Dodgers were unable to score until Smith hit a game-tying homer in the eighth inning. The game remained tied into the 15th inning when the Dodgers scored twice only for the Padres to tie the game again on a two-run homer by Fernando Tatís Jr. and finally A. J. Pollock hit a two-run homer in the 16th to give the Dodgers a 5–3 win. It was the longest baseball game in two years and the Dodgers bullpen allowed only one hit (the homerun) in 9 1/3 innings. The only other bullpen that accomplished that was the 2007 Dodgers. The Dodgers finished off the sweep with a 4–0 victory. Scherzer struck out 10 in 7 2/3 scoreless innings while allowing only two hits and one walk and Austin Barnes homered.

The Dodgers returned home to play the Colorado Rockies on August 27 and dropped the opener of the series 4–2. The Dodgers evened the series up with a 5–2 win in the following game. Will Smith's two run double in the eighth inning put the Dodgers ahead to stay. The Rockies shutout the Dodgers in the series finale, 5–0, with Antonio Senzatela allowing only two hits in seven innings. The Dodgers hit four home runs (Muncy, Smith, Betts, Seager) as they beat the Atlanta Braves 5–3 to start their next series. The Dodgers finished the month with a 3–2 win. Mookie Betts homered in the game, and Corey Seager's RBI double in the eighth provided the winning margin.

==== September / October ====
The Dodgers beat the Braves 4–3 on September 1 to sweep the series and move past the San Francisco Giants into first place in the National League West for the first time since April 28. Max Scherzer struck out nine in six scoreless innings and an RBI single by A. J. Pollock in the eighth provided the winning run.

The Dodgers traveled to Oracle Park on September 3 to play the Giants for three games with two teams tied for first place at the start of the series. The opener was a pitchers duel with the Giants winning 3–2 in 11 innings. The winning run scored on a throwing error by Trea Turner. The Dodgers won the next day, 6–1, to even up the series and tie up the division again. Trea Turner and Corey Seager homered in the game while Julio Urías struck out eight in 5 2/3 innings. The Giants recaptured the division lead with a 6–4 win in the series finale. Next up was a four-game series at Busch Stadium against the St. Louis Cardinals. The Dodgers won the opener, 5–1, on Labor Day with Scherzer striking out 13 in eight innings. In the next game, Justin Turner homered twice and Albert Pujols and Will Smith also homered as the Dodgers won 7–2. The Cardinals won the third game of the series, 5–4, and the fourth game, 2–1, to split the series.

The Dodgers returned home and beat the San Diego Padres, 3–0, behind seven shutout innings from Urías and a two-run homer by Max Muncy. Mookie Betts hit a three-run homer in the next game and the Dodgers won 5–4. The Dodgers finished off the series sweep with an 8–0 victory as Scherzer allowed only one hit in eight scoreless innings while striking out nine. In the following game, Clayton Kershaw returned to the mound for the first time since being placed on the injured list after his July 3 appearance and he struck out five while allowing one run in five innings against the Arizona Diamondbacks. The Dodgers won 5–1. The Dodgers won again the next day, 8–4, to clinch a spot in the postseason for the ninth straight season. Tony Gonsolin struck out six while allowing only two hits in five scoreless innings. They completed the series sweep with a 5–3 win. Urías picked up his 18th win and Muncy hit his 35th homer.

The next trip was to Great American Ballpark to face the Cincinnati Reds, who beat the Dodgers 3–1 to start the series. Luis Castillo struk out 10 in 6 1/3 innings for the Reds. The Dodgers took the next game, 5–1, as Scherzer pitched seven scoreless innings. Kershaw struck out eight while allowing only one run in five innings of the following game while Gavin Lux had three hits including a home run and drove in three RBI in an 8–5 win. Next up was a three-game series at Coors Field against the Colorado Rockies, starting with a 5–4 win in 10 innings. Albert Pujols drove in the winning run. However, Walker Buehler struggled in the next game, allowing five runs on seven hits in only 3 2/3 innings as the Dodgers lost to the Rockies 10–5. The Dodgers won the final game of the series, 7–5, thanks to a two-run homer by Muncy in the 10th inning. On September 24, the Dodgers traveled to Chase Field to play the Diamondbacks and began with a 4–2 win. A. J. Pollock homered in the game. That was followed by a 7–2 loss. In their final road game of the regular season, the Dodgers beat the Diamondbacks 3–0 for their 100th win of the season. Seager and Trea Turner homered in the game.

Back home for a series against the Padres, the Dodgers won 2–1. Buehler bounced back from a few poor outings by pitching seven scoreless innings in the game. The Dodgers won the next game, 11–9, thanks to six home runs (four in the eighth inning alone), including two by Pollock. They also won the next game, 8–3, to end September with their third straight sweep of the Padres. They hit five more home runs in the game, with two of them from Seager. The Dodgers ended the season with a three-game series with the Milwaukee Brewers. They fell behind 5–1 in the opener but tied the game on a grand-slam home run by Trea Turner in the fifth inning (his second homer of the game), took the lead on a Matt Beaty homer in the seventh and won the game 8–6. In the next game, Julio Urías allowed only one run on one hit and two walks while striking out seven in 6 1/3 innings as he picked up his 20th win of the season in the Dodgers 8–3 victory. The Dodgers wrapped up the regular season with a 10–3 rout of the Brewers and a series sweep. Buehler struck out 11 in five innings and Trea Turner hit another grand slam as the Dodgers finished with a 106–56 record. However, they finished in second place behind the Giants and made the playoffs as a Wild Card team. The win tied the single-season franchise record for wins (106) and set a franchise record for consecutive home wins (15).

== Postseason ==
=== Game log ===
2021 Postseason Game Log: 6–6 (Home: 4–2; Away: 2–4)
National League Wild Card Game: 1–0 (Home: 1–0; Away: 0–0)

#	Date	Opponent	Score	Win	Loss	Save	Attendance	Record
1	October 6	Cardinals	W 3–1	Jansen (1–0)	McFarland (0–1)	–	53,193	1–0

National League Division Series: 3–2 (Home: 1–1; Away: 2–1)

#	Date	Opponent	Score	Win	Loss	Save	Attendance	Record
1	October 8	@ Giants	L 0–4	Webb (1–0)	Buehler (0–1)	–	41,934	0–1
2	October 9	@ Giants	W 9–2	Urías (1–0)	Gausman (0–1)	–	42,275	1–1
3	October 11	Giants	L 0–1	Rogers (1–0)	Scherzer (0–1)	Doval (1)	53,299	1–2
4	October 12	Giants	W 7–2	Kelly (1–0)	DeSclafani (0–1)	–	52,935	2–2
5	October 14	@ Giants	W 2–1	Jansen (1–0)	Doval (0–1)	Scherzer (1)	42,275	3–2

National League Championship Series: 2–4 (Home: 2–1; Away: 0–3)

#	Date	Opponent	Score	Win	Loss	Save	Attendance	Record
1	October 16	@ Braves	L 2–3	Smith (1–0)	Treinen (0–1)	—	41,815	0–1
2	October 17	@ Braves	L 4–5	Smith (2–0)	Graterol (0–1)	—	41,873	0–2
3	October 19	Braves	W 6–5	Gonsolin (1–0)	Jackson (0–1)	Jansen (1)	51,307	1–2
4	October 20	Braves	L 2–9	Smyly (1–0)	Urías (0–1)	—	53,025	1–3
5	October 21	Braves	W 11–2	Phillips (1–0)	Fried (0–1)	—	51,363	2–3
6	October 23	@ Braves	L 2–4	Matzek (1–0)	Buehler (0–1)	Smith (1)	43,060	2–4

=== Postseason rosters ===
Playoff rosters
National League Wild Card Game

- Pitchers: 7 Julio Urías 17 Joe Kelly 26 Tony Gonsolin 31 Max Scherzer 46 Corey Knebel 48 Brusdar Graterol 49 Blake Treinen 51 Alex Vesia 52 Phil Bickford 74 Kenley Jansen
- Catchers: 15 Austin Barnes 16 Will Smith
- Infielders: 5 Corey Seager 6 Trea Turner 9 Gavin Lux 10 Justin Turner 45 Matt Beaty 55 Albert Pujols
- Outfielders: 3 Chris Taylor 8 Zach McKinstry 11 A. J. Pollock 18 Steven Souza Jr. 29 Billy McKinney 35 Cody Bellinger 37 Luke Raley 50 Mookie Betts

National League Division Series

- Pitchers: 7 Julio Urías 17 Joe Kelly 21 Walker Buehler 26 Tony Gonsolin 31 Max Scherzer 33 David Price 46 Corey Knebel 48 Brusdar Graterol 49 Blake Treinen 51 Alex Vesia 52 Phil Bickford 74 Kenley Jansen
- Catchers: 15 Austin Barnes 16 Will Smith
- Infielders: 5 Corey Seager 6 Trea Turner 9 Gavin Lux 10 Justin Turner 45 Matt Beaty 55 Albert Pujols
- Outfielders: 3 Chris Taylor 11 A. J. Pollock 18 Steven Souza Jr. 29 Billy McKinney 35 Cody Bellinger 50 Mookie Betts

National League Championship Series

- Pitchers: 7 Julio Urías 17 Joe Kelly (Game 1–5) 21 Walker Buehler 26 Tony Gonsolin 31 Max Scherzer 33 David Price (Game 6) 46 Corey Knebel 48 Brusdar Graterol 49 Blake Treinen 51 Alex Vesia 52 Phil Bickford 59 Evan Phillips 63 Justin Bruihl 74 Kenley Jansen
- Catchers: 15 Austin Barnes 16 Will Smith
- Infielders: 5 Corey Seager 6 Trea Turner 9 Gavin Lux 10 Justin Turner (Games 1–4) 29 Andy Burns (Game 5–6) 45 Matt Beaty 55 Albert Pujols
- Outfielders: 3 Chris Taylor 11 A. J. Pollock 18 Steven Souza Jr. 35 Cody Bellinger 50 Mookie Betts

=== National League Wild Card Game ===
The Dodgers played the St. Louis Cardinals in the Wild Card game. Max Scherzer started for the Dodgers and he pitched 4 1/3 innings, allowing only one run on three hits and three walks. Tommy Edman scored the Cardinals run in the first inning on a bloop single, stolen base and a wild pitch. Adam Wainwright pitched 5 1/3 innings for the Cardinals, allowing only a solo home run by Justin Turner in the fourth inning. The game remained tied until the bottom of the ninth when Chris Taylor hit a walk-off two-run home run off of Alex Reyes.

=== National League Division Series ===
The Dodgers played the San Francisco Giants in the division series, with the series starting at Oracle Park. Walker Buehler started for the Dodgers but the Giants pounced on him in the first inning, with a two-run homer by Buster Posey. Buehler recovered after that and kept the Giants from scoring again until allowing a solo homer by Kris Bryant in the seventh. Overall he allowed the three runs in 6 1/3 innings on six hits and one walk, while striking out five. The Giants added one more run on a homer by Brandon Crawford off Alex Vesia in the eighth. Meanwhile, Logan Webb pitched for the Giants and completely dominated the Dodgers, allowing five hits in 7 2/3 scoreless innings while striking out 10. The Giants took game one, 4–0. Julio Urías started the second game for the Dodgers and only allowed one run on three hits in five innings, with five strikeouts. Kevin Gausman for the Giants allowed four runs in 5 1/3 innings. The Dodgers scored the first two runs in the second on RBI singles by Urías and Mookie Betts with the Giants getting one back in the bottom of the inning on a sacrifice fly by Donovan Solano. The Dodgers then scored four runs in the sixth on back-to-back doubles by Cody Bellinger and A. J. Pollock and they added three more in the eighth on a Will Smith homer and RBI singles by Matt Beaty and Corey Seager off of relievers Zack Littell and Jarlin García. The Giants scored on a Crawford single off Joe Kelly in the sixth but lost the game 9–2 to even up the series.

The series moved to Dodger Stadium for Game 3. Max Scherzer allowed only three hits and one walk in seven innings while striking out 10. However, one of the hits he allowed was a solo home run by Evan Longoria in the fifth inning. Alex Wood and three relievers combined to hold the Dodgers scoreless for the second time in the series and the Giants took back the lead with a 1–0 victory. In Game 4, the Dodgers jumped out to an early lead on a first inning RBI double by Trea Turner and a second inning sacrifice fly by Chris Taylor, driving Giants starter Anthony DeSclafani out of the game after just 1 2/3 innings, where he allowed the two runs on five hits. A two-run homer by Mookie Betts in the fourth inning off of Jarlin García extended the lead. Buehler, starting on short rest for the first time in his career, pitched 4 1/3 innings for the Dodgers, walking two and giving up only three hits. He left the game with two runners on, one of whom (Longoria), scored on a Darin Ruf ground out against Joe Kelly. The Dodgers got the run back on a Betts sacrifice fly off of Tyler Rogers. Kris Bryant drove in the Giants second run on a ground out against Blake Treinen in the eighth but the Dodgers put the game out of reach thanks to a Smith two-run homer in the bottom of the eighth against Jake McGee. They won 7–2 to tie the series up once more.

Logan Webb started the deciding Game 5 for the Giants, allowing only one run on four hits in seven innings, while striking out seven. The one run scored when Betts singled, stole second, and then scored on a double by Seager in the sixth inning. The Giants promptly tied the game up in the bottom of the inning on a solo homer by Darin Ruf off Urías, who worked four innings (entering in the third after two one inning openers), allowing the one run on three hits while striking out five. The game remained tied until the ninth inning. The Dodgers scored in the top of the inning when Bellinger singled in Justin Turner off of Camilo Doval. Scherzer pitched the bottom of the ninth and picked up his first career save as the Dodgers won 2–1 to take the series.

=== National League Championship Series ===
The Dodgers faced the Atlanta Braves in the NLCS for the second straight year. Max Fried started for Atlanta, while Corey Knebel acted as an opener for Los Angeles. Atlanta took a 1–0 lead in the bottom of the first, as Eddie Rosario singled, stole second, advanced to third on a ground out, and scored on a wild pitch. The Dodgers tied the game in the top of the second; A. J. Pollock hit a two-out double and scored on a single by Chris Taylor. The teams traded solo home runs in the fourth inning—Will Smith for Los Angeles and Austin Riley for Atlanta—leaving the score tied, 2–2. Fried left after six innings, having allowed eight hits while striking out five batters. A two-out threat by the Dodgers in the top of the ninth was ended when Taylor was tagged out after being caught in a rundown between second and third. In the bottom of the ninth, Ozzie Albies hit a one-out bloop single off of Blake Treinen, stole second, and then scored on a Riley single to left, giving Atlanta a 1–0 lead in the series.

Game 2 was started by Ian Anderson for Atlanta and Max Scherzer for Los Angeles. Mookie Betts opened the game with a single, followed by a home run from Corey Seager, staking the Dodgers to an early 2–0 lead. Anderson was pinch hit for in the bottom of the third, having allowed two runs on three hits while striking out two batters. In the bottom of the fourth, Joc Pederson hit a one-out homer with Austin Riley on base, tying the game, 2–2. Scherzer left with one out in the bottom of the fifth, having allowed two runs on four hits while striking out seven. In the top of the seventh, the Dodgers had the bases loaded with two outs following two walks and a hit batsman; Taylor then drove in two runs with a double off of Luke Jackson, putting Los Angeles ahead, 4–2. With one out in the bottom of the eighth, Ozzie Albies singled off of Julio Urías to drive in Rosario from second, pulling Atlanta within a run, 4–3. Riley then doubled to deep center, scoring Albies from first and tying the game, 4–4. Brusdar Graterol came in to pitch the bottom of the ninth; he recorded two outs and, with Dansby Swanson at second, was replaced by Kenley Jansen. Rosario hit Jansen's first pitch up the middle, getting by Seager and driving in Swanson. The braves would win the game 5-4, giving them the 2–0 series lead.

Game 3 was started by Walker Buehler for Los Angeles and Charlie Morton for Atlanta. In the bottom of the first, Mookie Betts walked, then Seager homered, giving the Dodgers an early 2–0 lead. The Braves rallied back, scoring four runs in the top of the fourth inning. Freddie Freeman singled to open the inning, and with one out Austin Riley doubled and then Pederson singled to score Freeman. Adam Duvall subsequently singled to score Riley and tie the game, Travis d'Arnaud walked to load the bases, and Swanson singled to give the Braves a 3–2 lead. The final run of the inning came on a walk to Rosario that forced in a run. The Braves extended their lead in the top of the fifth with an RBI single by Duvall to bring Ozzie Albies in, making the score 5–2. In the bottom of the eighth, a three-run homer by Cody Bellinger with one out tied the game, 5–5. Betts doubled with two outs, scoring Taylor who had singled, to give the Dodgers a 6–5 lead. Jansen came in and struck out the side in the top of the ninth, giving the Dodgers their first win of the series. Luke Jackson, who was charged with all four eighth-inning runs, took the loss. The Dodgers used nine pitchers, with Buehler leaving after 3 2/3 innings having allowed four runs on seven hits. Tony Gonsolin, who recorded the final out in the top of the eighth, got the win, while Jansen earned the save.

Urías started Game 4 for the Dodgers and Jesse Chavez acted as an opener for the Braves. Atlanta took a 2–0 lead in the top of the second on back-to-back solo home runs by Rosario and Duvall. A solo homer by Freeman in the top of the third, along with a Rosario triple and a Pederson single to drive him in, extended the lead to 4–0. With runners on first and third with one out in the top of the fifth, Duvall hit a sacrifice fly to make it 5–0. The Dodgers got two runs back in the bottom of the fifth; with two outs and runners on second and third, Pollock singled, trimming Atlanta's lead to 5–2. In the top of the ninth, Dansby Swanson singled, stole second, and was driven in by a Freeman ground rule double, extending Atlanta's lead to 6–2. Rosario's second home run of the game, with two men on base, made it 9–2. With a scoreless bottom of the ninth, the Braves took a 3–1 lead in the series.Drew Smyly, the second of six Braves pitchers, got the win after pitching 3 1/3 innings and allowing two runs on two hits. Urías, who pitched five innings for the Dodgers, allowed five runs on eight hits and took the loss. Justin Turner injured his hamstring in this game and was removed from the Dodgers' playoff roster.

With their backs against the wall, the Dodgers started Joe Kelly as an opener in Game 5 against Max Fried. Albies singled with one out in the top of the first, then Freeman homered to give the Braves an early 2–0 lead. Kelly left with two outs, due to right bicep tightness but the Dodgers bullpen did not allow another run all game. Pollock] led off the bottom of the second with a solo home run; he was followed by Albert Pujols who singled, then Chris Taylor homered to put the Dodgers ahead, 3–2. With one out in the bottom of the third, the Dodgers had consecutive singles from Pollock, Pujols, and Taylor, adding a run to make it 4–2. With two outs in the bottom of the fifth, Pujols walked and was followed by Taylor's second home run of the game, extending the Dodgers' lead to 6–2. With two outs in the bottom of the seventh, Taylor hit his third home run, a solo shot making it a 7–2 game. Only 10 players had previously hit three home runs in a playoff game, the first being Babe Ruth in 1926 and the 10th being Enrique Hernández in 2017. In the bottom of the eighth, Betts led off with single, stole second, and scored on a single by Trea Turner. With one out, Pollock hit his second home run of the game, coming with two men on base to grow the lead to 11–2.

Buehler started the game for the Dodgers on short rest, Ian Anderson started for Atlanta. The Braves took a 1–0 lead in the bottom of the first, on back-to-back two-out doubles by Albies and Riley. The Dodgers tied the game in the top of the fourth, as Bellinger hit a two-out single with runners on first and second, scoring Trea Turner. Anderson was lifted in favor of pinch hitter Ehire Adrianza in the bottom of the fourth inning. After Adrianza doubled with two outs, putting runners at second and third, Rosario hit a home run to put Atlanta back in the lead, 4–1. The Dodgers opened the seventh inning with a double by Taylor and a walk by Bellinger; Pollock then doubled down the left-field line, driving in Taylor and leaving runners at second and third with no one out, and Braves' lead reduced to 4–2. The Braves' Tyler Matzek entered to pitch and struck out Pujols, Steven Souza Jr., and Mookie Betts to end the threat. Matzek returned to pitch the top of the eighth and retired the side in order. Atlanta closer Will Smith came in to pitch the top of the ninth with a two-run lead. He struck out Taylor and Bellinger for the first two outs; Pollock then grounded out to end the game and send Atlanta to the World Series for the first time since 1999.

== Roster ==
2021 Los Angeles Dodgers
Roster
Pitchers: 75 Scott Alexander; 27 Trevor Bauer; 52 Phil Bickford; 63 Justin Bruihl; 21 Walker Buehler; 61 Garrett Cleavinger; 25 Neftalí Feliz; 26 Tony Gonsolin; 81 Víctor González; 48 Brusdar Graterol; 41 Josiah Gray; 71 Conner Greene; 28 Shane Greene; 94 Andre Jackson; 74 Kenley Jansen; 41 Nate Jones; 17 Joe Kelly; 22 Clayton Kershaw; 59 Mike Kickham; 46 Corey Knebel; 85 Dustin May; 40 Jimmy Nelson; 62 Darien Núñez; 59 Evan Phillips; 33 David Price; 41 Kevin Quackenbush; 67 Yefry Ramírez; 57 Jake Reed; 77 Dennis Santana; 31 Max Scherzer; 58 Jimmie Sherfy; 49 Blake Treinen; 92 Edwin Uceta; 7 Julio Urías; 68 Andrew Vásquez; 51 Alex Vesia; 66 Mitch White	Catchers: 15 Austin Barnes; 25 Keibert Ruiz; 16 Will Smith; Infielders: 29,28 Andy Burns; 9 Gavin Lux; 13 Max Muncy; 56 Sheldon Neuse; 55 Albert Pujols; 43 Edwin Ríos; 5 Corey Seager; 10 Justin Turner; 6 Trea Turner	Outfielders: 45 Matt Beaty; 35 Cody Bellinger; 50 Mookie Betts; 29 Billy McKinney; 8 Zach McKinstry; 38 DJ Peters; 11 A. J. Pollock; 37,62 Luke Raley; 84 Zach Reks; 18,23 Steven Souza Jr.; 3 Chris Taylor; 28 Yoshi Tsutsugo	Manager: 30 Dave Roberts; Coaches: 54 Josh Bard (bullpen); 65 Aaron Bates (assistant hitting); 73 Brant Brown (hitting); 82 Steve Cilladi (bullpen catcher); 91 Dino Ebel (third base); 88 Bob Geren (bench); 0 Danny Lehmann (game planning & communication); 86 Clayton McCullough (first base); 87 Connor McGuinness (assistant pitching); 99 Mark Prior (pitching); 72 Robert Van Scoyoc (hitting)

== Statistics ==
=== Batting ===
List does not include pitchers. Stats in bold are the team leaders.

Note: G = Games played; AB = At bats; R = Runs; H = Hits; 2B = Doubles; 3B = Triples; HR = Home runs; RBI = Runs batted in; BB = Walks; SO = Strikeouts; SB = Stolen bases; AVG = Batting average; OBP = On-base percentage; SLG = Slugging percentage; OPS = On Base + Slugging

Player	G	AB	R	H	2B	3B	HR	RBI	BB	SO	SB	AVG	OBP	SLG	OPS
Justin Turner	**151**	**533**	87	**148**	22	0	27	87	61	98	3	**.278**	.361	.471	.832
Chris Taylor	148	507	92	129	25	**4**	20	73	63	**167**	**13**	.254	.344	.438	.782
Max Muncy	144	497	**95**	124	26	2	**36**	**94**	**83**	120	2	.249	**.368**	**.527**	**.895**
Mookie Betts	122	466	93	123	**29**	3	23	58	68	86	10	.264	.367	.487	.854
Will Smith	130	414	71	107	19	2	25	76	58	101	3	.258	.365	.495	.860
A. J. Pollock	117	384	53	114	27	1	21	69	30	80	9	.297	.355	.536	.892
Corey Seager	95	353	54	108	22	3	16	57	48	66	1	.306	.394	.521	.915
Gavin Lux	102	335	49	81	12	**4**	7	46	41	83	4	.242	.328	.364	.692
Cody Bellinger	95	315	39	52	9	2	10	36	31	94	3	.165	.240	.302	.542
Trea Turner	52	207	41	70	17	0	10	28	15	33	11	.338	.385	.565	.950
Matt Beaty	120	204	35	55	4	1	7	40	20	44	2	.270	.363	.402	.765
Austin Barnes	77	200	28	43	8	0	6	23	20	56	1	.215	.299	.345	.644
Albert Pujols	85	189	20	48	3	0	12	38	11	32	1	.254	.299	.460	.759
Zach McKinstry	60	158	19	34	9	0	7	29	10	50	1	.215	.263	.405	.668
Billy McKinney	37	82	8	12	2	1	1	7	14	24	0	.146	.276	.232	.507
Luke Raley	33	66	5	12	1	0	2	4	2	25	0	.182	.250	.288	.538
Sheldon Neuse	33	65	6	11	1	0	3	4	1	26	1	.169	.182	.323	.505
Edwin Ríos	25	51	4	4	0	0	1	1	7	18	0	.078	.217	.137	.354
Steven Souza Jr.	17	33	2	5	1	1	1	3	2	14	0	.152	.222	.333	.556
DJ Peters	18	26	5	5	2	0	1	4	8	14	0	.192	.382	.385	.767
Yoshi Tsutsugo	12	25	2	3	0	0	0	2	6	12	0	.120	.290	.120	.410
Andy Burns	9	11	2	3	1	0	0	0	3	1	0	.273	.467	.364	.830
Zach Reks	6	10	2	0	0	0	0	0	0	7	0	.000	.000	.000	.000
Keibert Ruiz	6	7	1	1	0	0	1	1	0	5	0	.143	.143	.571	.714
Non-Pitcher Totals	162	5138	813	1292	240	24	237	780	602	1256	65	.251	.339	.446	.785
**Team totals**	**162**	**5445**	**830**	**1330**	**247**	**24**	**237**	**799**	**613**	**1408**	**65**	**.244**	**.330**	**.429**	**.759**

=== Pitching ===
List does not include position players. Stats in bold are the team leaders.

Note: W = Wins; L = Losses; ERA = Earned run average; G = Games pitched; GS = Games started; SV = Saves; IP = Innings pitched; H = Hits allowed; R = Runs allowed; ER = Earned runs allowed; BB = Walks allowed; K = Strikeouts

Player	W	L	ERA	G	GS	SV	IP	H	R	ER	BB	K
Walker Buehler	16	4	**2.47**	33	**33**	0	**207.2**	149	61	57	**52**	**212**
Julio Urías	**20**	3	2.96	32	32	0	185.2	**151**	**67**	**61**	38	195
Clayton Kershaw	10	**8**	3.55	22	22	0	121.2	103	51	48	21	144
Trevor Bauer	8	5	2.59	17	17	0	107.2	71	36	31	37	137
David Price	5	2	4.03	39	11	1	73.2	79	35	33	26	58
Blake Treinen	6	5	1.99	**72**	0	7	72.1	46	20	16	25	85
Kenley Jansen	4	4	2.22	69	0	**38**	69.0	36	21	17	36	86
Max Scherzer	7	0	1.98	11	11	0	68.1	48	17	15	8	89
Tony Gonsolin	4	1	3.23	15	13	0	55.2	41	20	20	34	65
Phil Bickford	4	2	2.50	56	0	1	50.1	34	16	14	18	59
Mitch White	1	3	3.66	21	4	0	46.2	38	28	19	17	49
Joe Kelly	2	0	2.86	48	0	2	44.0	28	16	14	15	50
Alex Vesia	3	1	2.25	41	0	1	40.0	17	17	10	22	54
Victor González	3	1	3.57	44	1	1	35.1	32	14	14	19	33
Brusdar Graterol	3	0	4.59	34	1	0	33.1	34	18	17	13	27
Jimmy Nelson	1	2	1.86	28	1	0	29.0	14	8	6	13	44
Corey Knebel	4	0	2.45	27	4	3	25.2	16	8	7	9	30
Dustin May	1	1	2.74	5	5	0	23.0	16	8	7	6	35
Edwin Uceta	0	3	6.64	14	1	0	20.1	19	18	15	12	25
Justin Bruihl	0	1	2.89	21	2	0	18.2	13	7	6	7	11
Garrett Cleavinger	2	4	3.00	22	1	0	18.0	20	11	6	12	21
Scott Alexander	0	2	2.93	18	0	0	15.1	15	6	5	4	8
Dennis Santana	0	0	6.00	16	0	0	15.0	18	11	10	11	8
Andre Jackson	0	1	2.31	3	0	1	11.2	10	3	3	6	10
Evan Phillips	1	1	3.48	7	0	0	10.1	8	5	4	5	9
Nate Jones	0	0	8.31	8	0	0	8.2	8	9	8	2	7
Josiah Gray	0	0	6.75	2	1	0	8.0	7	6	6	5	13
Darien Nuñez	0	1	8.22	6	1	0	7.2	8	8	7	4	8
Shane Greene	0	0	4.05	9	0	1	6.2	3	3	3	5	7
Jake Reed	0	0	3.38	6	1	0	5.1	5	3	2	2	5
Jimmie Sherfy	1	1	4.15	4	0	0	4.1	3	3	2	0	3
Neftalí Feliz	0	0	0.00	3	0	0	3.0	1	0	0	0	1
Conner Greene	0	0	0.00	2	0	0	2.0	2	0	0	0	2
Mike Kickham	0	0	13.50	1	0	0	2.0	5	3	3	1	2
Yefry Ramírez	0	0	0.00	1	0	0	2.0	0	0	0	1	2
Andrew Vasquez	0	0	0.00	2	0	0	1.2	1	1	0	0	3
Kevin Quackenbush	0	0	27.00	1	0	0	0.1	3	1	1	0	1
**Team totals**	**106**	**56**	**3.01**	**162**	**162**	**56**	**1452.0**	**1107**	**561**	**486**	**486**	**1599**

== Awards and honors ==
Recipient	Award	Date awarded	Ref.
Mookie Betts	National League All-Star Team	July 5, 2021	
Max Muncy	National League All-Star Team	July 5, 2021	
Chris Taylor	National League All-Star Team	July 5, 2021	
Walker Buehler	National League All-Star Team	July 10, 2021	
Justin Turner	National League All-Star Team	July 10, 2021	
A. J. Pollock	National League Player of the Week Award (July 5–11)	July 12, 2021	
Chris Taylor	National League Player of the Week Award (July 19–25)	July 26, 2021	
Walker Buehler	National League Pitcher of the Month Award (July)	August 2, 2021	
Max Scherzer	National League Player of the Week Award (September 6–12)	September 13, 2021	
Chris Taylor	Roy Campanella Award	October 2, 2021	
Trea Turner	National League Player of the Week Award (September 27–October 3)	October 4, 2021	
Max Scherzer	Players Choice Award for National League’s Outstanding Pitcher	October 28, 2021	
Walker Buehler	All-MLB Team	November 23, 2021	
Max Scherzer	All-MLB Team	November 23, 2021	
Kenley Jansen	All-MLB Team (second team)	November 23, 2021	
Trea Turner	All-MLB Team (second team)	November 23, 2021	
Julio Urías	All-MLB Team (second team)	November 23, 2021	
Julio Urías	Warren Spahn Award	December 2, 2021	

== Transactions ==
=== April ===
- On April 1, placed RHP Brusdar Graterol and RHP Joe Kelly on the 10-day injured list.
- On April 4, placed RHP Tony Gonsolin on the 10-day injured list with right shoulder inflammation and recalled RHP Dennis Santana from the alternate training site.
- On April 9, placed OF Cody Bellinger on the 10-day injured list with left calf contusion and recalled OF Luke Raley from the alternate training site.
- On April 10, claimed RHP Ashton Goudeau off waivers from the San Francisco Giants.
- On April 17, optioned 1B/OF Matt Beaty to the alternate training site and recalled LHP Alex Vesia from the alternate training site.
- On April 18, placed 2B Gavin Lux on the 10-day injured list with right wrist soreness, optioned LHP Alex Vesia to the alternate training site, recalled IF Sheldon Neuse from the alternate training site, activated RHP Brusdar Graterol from the 10-day injured list and designated RHP Ashton Goudeau for assignment.
- On April 23, placed IF/OF Zach McKinstry on the 10-day injured list with a right wrist strain, and recalled OF DJ Peters from the alternate training site.
- On April 24, placed RHP Corey Knebel on the 10-day injured list with a right lat strain, placed RHP Dennis Santana on the COVID-related injured list with a reaction to the COVID-19 vaccine, and recalled IF/OF Matt Beaty and LHP Garrett Cleavinger from the alternate training site.
- On April 26, placed LHP David Price on the 10-day injured list with a right hamstring strain, activated 2B Gavin Lux from the 10-day injured list and RHP Dennis Santana from the COVID-related injured list, recalled RHP Mitch White from the alternate training site and optioned LHP Garrett Cleavinger and OF DJ Peters to the alternate training site.
- On April 27, placed LHP Victor González and RHP Mitch White on the COVID-related injured list, and recalled LHP Garrett Cleavinger and OF DJ Peters from the alternate training site.
- On April 28, activated LHP Victor González from the COVID-related injured list and optioned OF DJ Peters to the alternate training site.
- On April 29, activated RHP Mitch White from the COVID-related injured list and optioned OF Luke Raley to the alternate training site. Placed RHP Brusdar Graterol on the 10-day injured list with right forearm tightness and recalled RHP Edwin Uceta from the alternate training site.

=== May ===
- On May 1, optioned RHP Edwin Uceta to the alternate training site and recalled LHP Alex Vesia from the alternate training site.
- On May 2, placed RHP Dustin May on the 10-day injured list with a right arm injury, transferred RHP Corey Knebel from the 10-day injured list to the 60-day injured list and purchased the contract of LHP Mike Kickham.
- On May 3, claimed RHP Phil Bickford off waivers from the Milwaukee Brewers and designated LHP Mike Kickham for assignment.
- On May 4, recalled C Keibert Ruiz from the alternate training site. Recalled OF Luke Raley from the alternate training site as the 27th man for the second game of a doubleheader.
- On May 5, optioned OF Luke Raley to AAA Oklahoma City, placed IF Edwin Ríos on the 10-day injured list with a sore right shoulder and recalled RHP Edwin Uceta from AAA Oklahoma City.
- On May 6, placed LHP Scott Alexander on the 10-day injured list with left shoulder inflammation and activated RHP Joe Kelly from the 10-day injured list.
- On May 8, optioned RHP Edwin Uceta to AAA Oklahoma City and recalled OF DJ Peters from AAA Oklahoma City.
- On May 10, optioned C Keibert Ruiz to AAA Oklahoma City.
- On May 11, recalled OF Luke Raley from AAA Oklahoma City.
- On May 14, claimed IF Travis Blankenhorn off waivers from the Minnesota Twins and transferred RHP Dustin May from the 10-day injured list to the 60-day injured list.
- On May 15, placed OF AJ Pollock on the 10-day injured list with a left hamstring strain and recalled RHP Edwin Uceta from AAA Oklahoma City. Acquired IF/OF Yoshi Tsutsugo from the Tampa Bay Rays for a player to be named later or cash considerations and transferred IF Edwin Ríos from the 10-day injured list to the 60-day injured list.
- On May 16, placed SS Corey Seager on the 10-day injured list with a fractured right hand and recalled C Keibert Ruiz from AAA Oklahoma City.
- On May 17, signed free agent 1B Albert Pujols to a one-year contract and transferred RHP Tony Gonsolin from the 10-day injured list to the 60-day injured list. Activated Pujols and IF/OF Yoshi Tsutsugo, activated LHP David Price from the 10-day injured list and optioned C Keibert Ruiz, RHP Mitch White and LHP Alex Vesia to AAA Oklahoma City.
- On May 18, placed LHP Garrett Cleavinger on the 10-day injured list with left forearm inflammation and recalled LHP Alex Vesia from AAA Oklahoma City.
- On May 21, purchased the contract of RHP Nate Jones from AAA Oklahoma City, optioned OF Luke Raley to AAA Oklahoma City and designated IF Travis Blankenhorn for assignment.
- On May 22, placed RHP Jimmy Nelson on the 10-day injured list with right forearm inflammation and recalled RHP Phil Bickford from Triple-A Oklahoma City.
- On May 27, optioned RHP Dennis Santana to AAA Oklahoma City and recalled RHP Mitch White from AAA Oklahoma City.
- On May 29, activated OF Cody Bellinger and IF/OF Zach McKinstry from the 10-day injured list and optioned IF Sheldon Neuse and OF DJ Peters to AAA Oklahoma City.

=== June ===
- On June 3, activated OF A. J. Pollock and RHP Jimmy Nelson from the 10-day injured list and optioned RHP Edwin Uceta and LHP Alex Vesia to AAA Oklahoma City.
- On June 4, activated RHP Brusdar Graterol from the 10-day injured list and optioned him to AAA Oklahoma City.
- On June 9, activated RHP Tony Gonsolin from the 60-day injured list, placed OF Yoshi Tsutsugo on the 10-day injured list with a right calf strain and transferred LHP Scott Alexander from the 10-day injured list to the 60-day injured list.
- On June 12, purchased the contract of IF Andy Burns from AAA Oklahoma City, optioned RHP Mitch White to AAA Oklahoma City and designated RHP Dennis Santana for assignment. Placed 1B Max Muncy on the 10-day injured list with an oblique strain and recalled OF Luke Raley from AAA Oklahoma City.
- On June 15, placed OF Cody Bellinger on the 10-day injured list with a hamstring injury and recalled RHP Mitch White from AAA Oklahoma City.
- On June 16, purchased the contract of OF Steven Souza Jr. from AAA Oklahoma City and designated RHP Nate Jones for assignment.
- On June 17, activated LHP Garrett Cleavinger from the 10-day injured list and optioned OF Luke Raley to AAA Oklahoma City.
- On June 20, optioned RHP Mitch White to AAA Oklahoma City and recalled RHP Edwin Uceta from AAA Oklahoma City.
- On June 21, optioned RHP Edwin Uceta to AAA Oklahoma City and recalled OF Zach Reks from AAA Oklahoma City.
- On June 22, activated 1B Max Muncy from the 10-day injured list and optioned OF Zach Reks to AAA Oklahoma City.
- On June 23, activated OF Cody Bellinger from the 10-day injured list and optioned IF Andy Burns to AAA Oklahoma City.
- On June 30, claimed RHP Bobby Wahl off waivers from the Milwaukee Brewers and optioned him to AAA Oklahoma City, transferred SS Corey Seager from the 10-day injured list to the 60-day injured list.

=== July ===
- On July 2, RHP Trevor Bauer was placed on 7-day administrative leave and RHP Brusdar Graterol was recalled from AAA Oklahoma City.
- On July 4, optioned RHP Brusdar Graterol to AAA Oklahoma City and recalled RHP Edwin Uceta from AAA Oklahoma City.
- On July 5, activated LHP Scott Alexander from the 60-day injured list and optioned LHP Garrett Cleavinger to AAA Oklahoma City.
- On July 6, purchased the contract of RHP Jake Reed from AAA Oklahoma City and designated OF Steven Souza Jr. for assignment. Placed LHP Victor González on the 10-day injured list with left plantar fasciitis and recalled LHP Garrett Cleavinger from AAA Oklahoma City.
- On July 7, placed LHP Clayton Kershaw on the 10-day injured list with left forearm inflammation, recalled RHP Mitch White from AAA Oklahoma City, and outrighted OF Yoshi Tsutsugo to AAA Oklahoma City.
- On July 8, optioned RHP Mitch White to AAA Oklahoma City and purchased the contract of LHP Darien Nuñez from AAA Oklahoma City.
- On July 9, placed LHP Jimmy Nelson on the 10-day injured list with a left lumbar strain and recalled LHP Alex Vesia from AAA Oklahoma City.
- On July 10, placed RHP Edwin Uceta on the 10-day injured list with a left lumbar strain and recalled OF Zach Reks from AAA Oklahoma City.
- On July 13, claimed RHP Jimmie Sherfy off waivers from the San Francisco Giants and designated RHP Bobby Wahl for assignment.
- On July 16, optioned OF Zach Reks to AAA Oklahoma City and activated RHP Jimmie Sherfy.
- On July 19, activated LHP Victor González from the 10-day injured list and optioned RHP Jake Reed to AAA Oklahoma City. Placed IF Gavin Lux on the 10-day injured list with a left hamstring strain and recalled OF Zach Reks from AAA Oklahoma City.
- On July 20, purchased the contract of RHP Josiah Gray from AAA Oklahoma City, placed LHP Scott Alexander on the 10-day injured list with left shoulder inflammation, activated RHP Edwin Uceta from the 10-day injured list, optioned Uceta to AAA Oklahoma City and designated IF Andy Burns for assignment.
- On July 21, acquired OF Billy McKinney from the New York Mets for minor league OF Carlos Rincon and designated RHP Jake Reed for assignment. Recalled IF Sheldon Neuse from AAA Oklahoma City and optioned LHP Darien Nuñez to AAA Oklahoma City.
- On July 22, activated OF Billy McKinney and optioned OF Zach Reks to AAA Oklahoma City.
- On July 23, placed IF Max Muncy on the paternity list and recalled RHP Brusdar Graterol from AAA Oklahoma City. Recalled LHP Darien Nuñez from AAA Oklahoma City and optioned LHP Garrett Cleavinger to AAA Oklahoma City.
- On July 24, placed RHP Jimmie Sherfy on the 10-day injured list with right elbow inflammation, optioned LHP Darien Nuñez to AAA Oklahoma City and recalled OF Luke Raley and RHP Mitch White from AAA Oklahoma City.
- On July 25, placed OF Mookie Betts on the 10-day injured list with right hip inflammation and activated RHP Jimmy Nelson from the 10-day injured list.
- On July 26, activated IF Max Muncy from the paternity list and optioned IF Sheldon Neuse to AAA Oklahoma City.
- On July 29, acquired LHP Danny Duffy and cash considerations from the Kansas City Royals for a player to be named later and designated OF DJ Peters for assignment.
- On July 30, acquired RHP Max Scherzer and IF Trea Turner from the Washington Nationals in exchange for RHPs Josiah Gray and Gerardo Carrillo, C Keibert Ruiz, and OF Donovan Casey, activated SS Corey Seager from the 60-day injured list and claimed C Chad Wallach off waivers from the Miami Marlins.
- On July 31, activated RHP Max Scherzer, placed RHP Tony Gonsolin on the 10-day injured list with right shoulder inflammation, recalled LHP Garrett Cleavinger and RHP Edwin Uceta from AAA Oklahoma City, and optioned RHP Brusdar Graterol and OF Luke Raley to AAA Oklahoma City.

=== August ===
- On August 1, activated OF Mookie Betts from the 10-day injured list, optioned RHP Mitch White and IF/OF Zach McKinstry to AAA Oklahoma City, purchased the contract of RHP Yefry Ramírez from AAA Oklahoma City and transferred RHP Jimmie Sherfy from the 10-day injured list to the 60-day injured list.
- On August 3, optioned RHP Yefry Ramírez to AAA Oklahoma City and recalled OF Zach Reks from AAA Oklahoma City. Placed RHP Edwin Uceta on the 10-day injured list with a right back strain and recalled RHP Brusdar Graterol from AAA Oklahoma City.
- On August 4, signed LHP Cole Hamels to a one-year contract, optioned him to the ACL Dodgers and designated RHP Yefry Ramírez for assignment. Placed RHP Jimmy Nelson on the 10-day injured list with right elbow inflammation and recalled LHP Darien Nuñez from AAA Oklahoma City.
- On August 6, activated IF Trea Turner from the COVID-19 related injured list, placed LHP Victor González on the 10-day injured list with right knee inflammation and transferred RHP Jimmy Nelson from the 10-day injured list to the 60-day injured list.
- On August 7, C Chad Wallach was claimed off waivers by the Los Angeles Angels. Placed LHP Darien Nuñez on the COVID-19 related injured list and purchased the contract of RHP Kevin Quackenbush from AAA Oklahoma City.
- On August 8, placed LHP Garrett Cleavinger on the 10-day injured list with a right oblique strain and purchased the contract of LHP Justin Bruihl from AAA Oklahoma City.
- On August 9, claimed C Anthony Bemboom off waivers from the Los Angeles Angels and RHP Conner Greene off waivers from the Baltimore Orioles and transferred LHPs Clayton Kershaw and Danny Duffy from the 10-day injured list to the 60-day injured list.
- On August 10, activated RHP Corey Knebel from the 60-day injured list and placed RHP Joe Kelly on the COVID-19 related injured list. Activated RHP Conner Greene and optioned OF Zach Reks to AAA Oklahoma City.
- On August 11, placed OF Mookie Betts on the 10-day injured list with a right hip injury and activated RHP Edwin Uceta from the 10-day injured list.
- On August 12, recalled RHP Mitch White from AAA Oklahoma City and designated RHP Kevin Quackenbush for assignment.
- On August 14, placed LHP Julio Urías on the 10-day injured list with left calf contusion and recalled IF/OF Zach McKinstry from AAA Oklahoma City. Outrighted C Anthony Bemboom to AAA Oklahoma City.
- On August 15, activated LHP Darien Nuñez from the COVID-19 related injured list and optioned IF/OF Zach McKinstry to AAA Oklahoma City.
- On August 16, claimed RHP Evan Phillips off waivers from the Tampa Bay Rays, selected the contract of RHP Neftalí Feliz from AAA Oklahoma City, recalled RHP Andre Jackson from AAA Oklahoma City, optioned LHP Darien Nuñez and RHP Edwin Uceta to AAA Oklahoma City and placed LHP Cole Hamels on the 60-day injured list.
- On August 17, activated RHP Evan Phillips, optioned RHPs Andre Jackson and Conner Greene to AAA Oklahoma City and activated IF Gavin Lux from the 10-day injured list.
- On August 19, activated LHP Victor González from the 10-day injured list and optioned RHP Mitch White to Low A Rancho Cucamonga.
- On August 20, signed RHP Shane Greene to a free agent contract and added him to the active roster, placed RHP Evan Phillips on the 10-day injured list with a right quad strain and designated RHP Conner Greene for assignment.
- On August 24, activated LHP Julio Urías from the 10-day injured list and designated RHP Neftalí Feliz for assignment.
- On August 25, activated RHP Joe Kelly from the COVID-19 related injured list and optioned LHP Victor González to AAA Oklahoma City.
- On August 26, activated OF Mookie Betts from the 10-day injured list, recalled LHP Darien Nuñez from AAA Oklahoma City and optioned IF Gavin Lux and IF/OF Matt Beaty to AAA Oklahoma City.
- On August 27, recalled RHP Andre Jackson from Low A Rancho Cucamonga and optioned LHP Darien Nuñez to Triple-A Oklahoma City.
- On August 28, recalled RHP Edwin Uceta from AAA Oklahoma City and optioned RHP Andre Jackson to AAA Oklahoma City.
- On August 29, recalled RHP Mitch White from Low A Rancho Cucamonga and optioned RHP Edwin Uceta to AAA Oklahoma City.
- On August 30, activated RHP Evan Phillips from the 10-day injured list and optioned RHP Mitch White to AAA Oklahoma City.
- On August 31, claimed RHPs Ryan Meisinger and Jake Jewell off waivers from the Chicago Cubs. Jewell was optioned to AAA Oklahoma City.

=== September / October ===
- On September 1, activated RHP Ryan Meisinger and recalled IF/OF Zach McKinstry from AAA Oklahoma City.
- On September 2, optioned RHP Ryan Meisinger to AAA Oklahoma City, purchased the contract of LHP Andrew Vasquez from AAA Oklahoma City and transferred LHP Scott Alexander from the 10-day injured list to the 60-day injured list.
- On September 5, placed OF A. J. Pollock on the 10-day injured list with a right hamstring sprain, recalled RHP Mitch White from Low A Rancho Cucamonga and outrighted RHP Ryan Meisinger to AAA Oklahoma City.
- On September 6, purchased the contract of RHP Neftalí Feliz from AAA Oklahoma City and optioned LHP Andrew Vasquez to AAA Oklahoma City.
- On September 7, purchased the contract of OF Steven Souza Jr. from AAA Oklahoma City, optioned IF/OF Zach McKinstry to AAA Oklahoma City and transferred LHP Garrett Cleavinger from the 10-day injured list to the 60-day injured list. RHP Jake Jewell was claimed off waivers by the San Francisco Giants.
- On September 9, activated RHP Tony Gonsolin from the 10-day injured list, recalled RHP Andre Jackson from AAA Oklahoma City, optioned RHP Mitch White to AAA Oklahoma City and designated RHP Neftalí Feliz for assignment.
- On September 10, recalled IF Gavin Lux and IF/OF Matt Beaty from AAA Oklahoma City, optioned RHP Andre Jackson to AAA Oklahoma City and placed OF Billy McKinney on the 10-day injured list with left hip impingement.
- On September 12, placed RHP Kenley Jansen on the paternity list and recalled RHP Mitch White from AAA Oklahoma City.
- On September 13, activated LHP Clayton Kershaw from the 60-day injured list and designated OF Steven Souza Jr. for assignment.
- On September 14, reinstated RHP Kenley Jansen from the paternity list and optioned RHP Mitch White to AAA Oklahoma City.
- On September 21, placed OF Cody Bellinger on the 10-day injured list with a non-displaced fracture in his left rib and recalled OF Luke Raley from AAA Oklahoma City.
- On September 22, activated OF A. J. Pollock from the 10-day injured list and designated RHP Shane Greene for assignment.
- On September 26, optioned OF Luke Raley to AAA Oklahoma City and recalled LHP Andrew Vasquez from AAA Oklahoma City.
- On September 28, activated OF Cody Bellinger from the 10-day injured list and placed 1B Albert Pujols on the COVID-19 related injured list.
- On September 29, activated 1B Albert Pujols from the COVID-19 injured list and optioned LHP Andrew Vasquez to AAA Oklahoma City.
- On October 2, placed LHP Clayton Kershaw on the 10-day injured list with left forearm discomfort and recalled RHP Mitch White from AAA Oklahoma City.
- On October 3, recalled RHP Andre Jackson from AAA Oklahoma City and optioned RHP Mitch White to AAA Oklahoma City.
- On October 21, purchased the contract of IF Andy Burns from AAA Oklahoma City and designated RHP Edwin Uceta for assignment.

== Farm system ==
Minor League Baseball underwent a significant change this year, MLB took direct control of the minor league system and replaced the old legacy league names with generic names depicting their level of play. For the Dodgers, the changes involved the Rancho Cucamonga Quakes and Great Lakes Loons switching division levels and the loss of the Ogden Raptors, previously the advanced rookie affiliate that would no longer be part of affiliated baseball.

Level	Team	League	Manager	W	L	Position
AAA	Oklahoma City Dodgers	Triple-A West (East Division)	Travis Barbary	61; 6	58; 4	2nd place Final Stretch
AA	Tulsa Drillers	Double-A Central (North Division)	Scott Hennessey	63	57	4th place
High A	Great Lakes Loons	High-A Central (East Division)	Austin Chubb	63	57	3rd place
Low A	Rancho Cucamonga Quakes	Low-A West (South Division)	John Shoemaker	67	53	1st place
Rookie	ACL Dodgers	Arizona Complex League (Central Division)	Tony Cappucilli	32	27	3rd place
Foreign Rookie	DSL Dodgers Bautista	Dominican Summer League (Northwest Division)	Jair Fernandez	32	25	3rd place
Foreign Rookie	DSL Dodgers Shoemaker	Dominican Summer League (North Division)	Cordell Hipolito	29	28	4th place

=== Minor League awards and honors ===
- All-Star Futures Game

Pitcher Andre Jackson
Second Baseman Michael Busch

- Branch Ricky Minor League Players of the Year

Pitcher Hyun-il Choi
Player Miguel Vargas

- Minor League Post-Season All-Stars

Double-A Central

Michael Busch (second base)
Miguel Vargas (third base)
Ryan Noda (designated hitter)

High-A Central

Andy Pages (outfielder) (also MVP and Prospect of the Year)
Ryan Ward (outfielder)

Low-A West

Sam McWilliams (second baseman)
Jorbit Vivas (third baseman)

Following the season, the Dodgers selected several top prospects to play for the Glendale Desert Dogs in the Arizona Fall League: Pitchers Bobby Miller, Landon Knack, Jeff Belge and Kyle Hurt, infielders Kody Hoese and Jacob Amaya and outfielder James Outman. Miller, Knack and Outman were selected to the Fall Stars Game.

== Major League Baseball draft ==
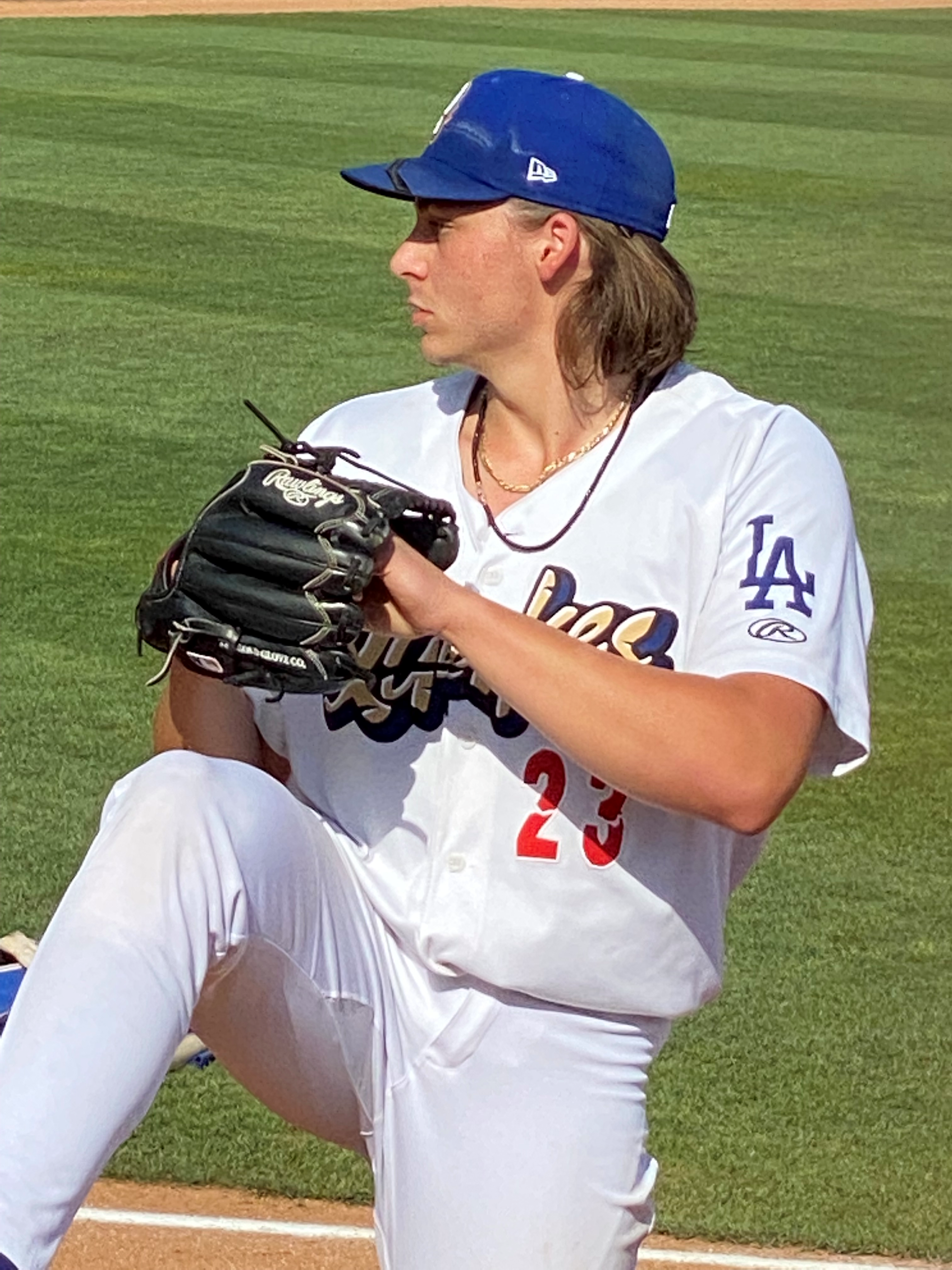
The Dodgers selected pitcher Maddux Bruns with their first round draft pick.

The 2021 Draft was held July 11–13, 2021. The Dodgers lost their second round pick as a result of signing pitcher Trevor Bauer as a free agent. With their first round pick the Dodgers selected left-handed pitcher Maddux Bruns from UMS-Wright Preparatory School. As of the 2026 season, five players from this draft have played in Major League Baseball.

2021 draft picks

Round	Name	Position	School	Signed	Career span	Highest level
1	Maddux Bruns	LHP	UMS-Wright Preparatory School	Yes	2021–present	AA
3	Peter Heubeck	RHP	Gilman School	Yes	2021–present	AA
4	Nick Nastrini	RHP	UCLA	Yes	2021–present	MLB
5	Ben Casparius	RHP	University of Connecticut	Yes	2021–present	MLB
6	Emmet Sheehan	RHP	Boston College	Yes	2021–present	MLB
7	Ryan Sublette	RHP	Texas Tech University	Yes	2021–present	AAA
8	Ben Harris	LHP	University of Georgia	Yes	2021–2025	AAA
9	Lael Lockhart	LHP	University of Arkansas	Yes	2021–present	AAA
10	Michael Hobbs	RHP	Saint Mary's College of California	Yes	2021–present	AA
11	Justin Wrobleski	LHP	Oklahoma State University	Yes	2022–present	MLB
12	Ronan Kopp	LHP	South Mountain Community College	Yes	2021–present	AAA
13	Antonio Knowles	RHP	Florida SouthWestern State College	Yes	2021–present	AAA
14	Jordan Leasure	RHP	University of Tampa	Yes	2021–present	MLB
15	Madison Jeffrey	RHP	West Virginia University	Yes	2022–present	A+
16	Mike Sirota	SS	The Gunnery School	No; Reds–2024	2025–present	AAA
17	Adam Tulloch	LHP	West Virginia University	No; Guardians–2022	2022–present	AA
18	Damon Keith	OF	California Baptist University	Yes	2021–present	AA
19	Gabe Emmett	RHP	Folsom Lake College	Yes	2021–present	A
20	Charlie Connolly	RHP	United States Naval Academy	No		
