= Jimmie Sherfy =

American baseball player (born 1991)

Free agent
- Pitcher
- Born: December 27, 1991 (age 34); Thousand Oaks, California, U.S.
- Bats: Right Throws: Right

MLB debut
- August 20, 2017, for the Arizona Diamondbacks

MLB statistics (through 2021 season)
- Win–loss record: 5–1
- Earned run average: 3.28
- Strikeouts: 60
- Stats at Baseball Reference

Teams
- Arizona Diamondbacks (2017–2019); San Francisco Giants (2021); Los Angeles Dodgers (2021)

James Harold Sherfy (born December 27, 1991) is an American professional baseball pitcher who is a free agent. He has previously played in Major League Baseball (MLB) for the Arizona Diamondbacks, San Francisco Giants, and Los Angeles Dodgers. He played college baseball at the University of Oregon. Sherfy was drafted by the Diamondbacks in the tenth round of the 2013 Major League Baseball draft.

== Career ==
=== Amateur career ===
Sherfy attended Newbury Park High School in Newbury Park, California, graduating in 2010. In his senior year, playing for the high school baseball team, he was named first-team All-Marmonte League after going 8–1 with a 2.25 ERA.

He played college baseball at the University of Oregon from 2011 to 2013. He was the Ducks closer in 2010 and 2011, recording 40 saves during that time. In 2012, he led the Pac-12 with 19 saves, and was second in strikeouts per 9 innings (13.6), fourth in hits per 9 innings (5.3), and fifth in strikeouts (93). In 2013, he was second in saves in the Pac-12 (21), and in strikeouts/nine innings (12.4). As a junior, he was named a first-team All-American by the National Collegiate Baseball Writers Association (NCBWA). Overall in his college career he was 7–3 with a 2.65 earned run average (ERA) and 148 strikeouts in 102 innings pitched (13.0 per nine innings).

=== Arizona Diamondbacks ===
Sherfy was drafted by the Arizona Diamondbacks in the tenth round, 300th overall, of the 2013 Major League Baseball draft. He made his professional debut with the Low-A Hillsboro Hops, and was promoted to the Single-A South Bend Silver Hawks during the season. He finished his first season with a 1–1 record, 1.04 ERA, 29 strikeouts, and seven saves over 17 1/3 innings.

Sherfy started the 2014 season with the High-A Visalia Rawhide, and also played with the Double-A Mobile BayBears, posting a 5–1 record and 4.59 ERA in 48 appearances. In 2015, he spent the entire season in Mobile, logging a 1–6 record and 6.52 ERA in 44 games. He split the 2016 season between the Triple-A Reno Aces, Mobile, and Visalia, accumulating a 3–4 record and 2.77 ERA in 55.1 innings of work between the three teams. The Diamondbacks added Sherfy to their 40-man roster after the 2016 season. He was assigned to Reno to begin the 2017 season.

Sherfy made his MLB debut on August 20, 2017, pitching a scoreless inning of relief against the Minnesota Twins. He finished his rookie season with 10.2 scoreless innings across 11 appearances. As of the end of the 2017 season, at 2-0 lifetime he was one of only two pitchers with a 1.000 winning percentage with Arizona who had more than one victory, with the other being Craig Breslow.

In 2018, Sherfy spent the majority of the year in Reno, but logged a neat 1.65 ERA in 15 major league games. Sherfy hit some struggles in 2019, recording a 5.89 ERA in 17 appearances for Arizona.

On January 9, 2020, Sherfy was designated for assignment by Arizona following the signing of Hector Rondon. He was outrighted to Triple-A Reno on January 16, and invited to spring training as a non-roster invitee. Sherfy was released by the Diamondbacks organization on August 18, 2020. The release was due to an arm injury, according to the Diamondbacks.

=== San Francisco Giants ===
On February 3, 2021, Sherfy signed a minor league contract with the San Francisco Giants that included an invitation to spring training. In May, Sherfy was named to the roster of the United States national baseball team for the Americas Qualifying Event.

On June 6, 2021, Sherfy was selected to the Giants’ 40-man roster, and placed on the 10-day injured list. He was activated and added to the active roster on June 9. Sherfy recorded a 4.22 ERA in 10 appearances before he was designated for assignment by the Giants on July 6.

=== Los Angeles Dodgers ===
On July 13, 2021, Sherfy was claimed off waivers by the Los Angeles Dodgers. He appeared in only four games for the Dodgers, allowing three runs in 4 1/3 innings before he was placed on the injured list on July 24 because of right elbow inflammation. He missed the rest of the season. The Dodgers outrighted him to the minors and removed him from the 40-man roster on November 5. Sherfy rejected the outright assignment and elected free agency.

=== Gastonia Honey Hunters ===
On April 8, 2022, Sherfy signed with the Gastonia Honey Hunters of the Atlantic League of Professional Baseball. Sherfy made two appearances for the Honey Hunters, allowing two earned runs and striking out six in two innings of work. On April 27, he retired from professional baseball.

=== Staten Island FerryHawks ===
On May 6, 2024, Sherfy came out of retirement to sign with the Staten Island FerryHawks of the Atlantic League of Professional Baseball. In 14 games for Staten Island, he struggled to a 6.91 ERA with 16 strikeouts across 14 1/3 innings pitched. On July 15, Sherfy was released by the FerryHawks.

=== Southern Maryland Blue Crabs ===
On February 14, 2025, Sherfy signed with the Gastonia Ghost Peppers of the Atlantic League of Professional Baseball. On April 23, Sherfy was traded to the Southern Maryland Blue Crabs. In nine appearances for Southern Maryland, he compiled a 1-1 record and 0.96 ERA with eight strikeouts and five saves across 9 1/3 innings of relief.

=== Toros de Tijuana ===
On May 25, 2025, Sherfy signed with the Toros de Tijuana of the Mexican League. In four appearances for Tijuana, he struggled to a 9.64 ERA with four strikeouts and one save across 4 2/3 innings pitched. Sherfy was released by the Toros on June 7.
