= Zach Reks =

American baseball player (born 1993)

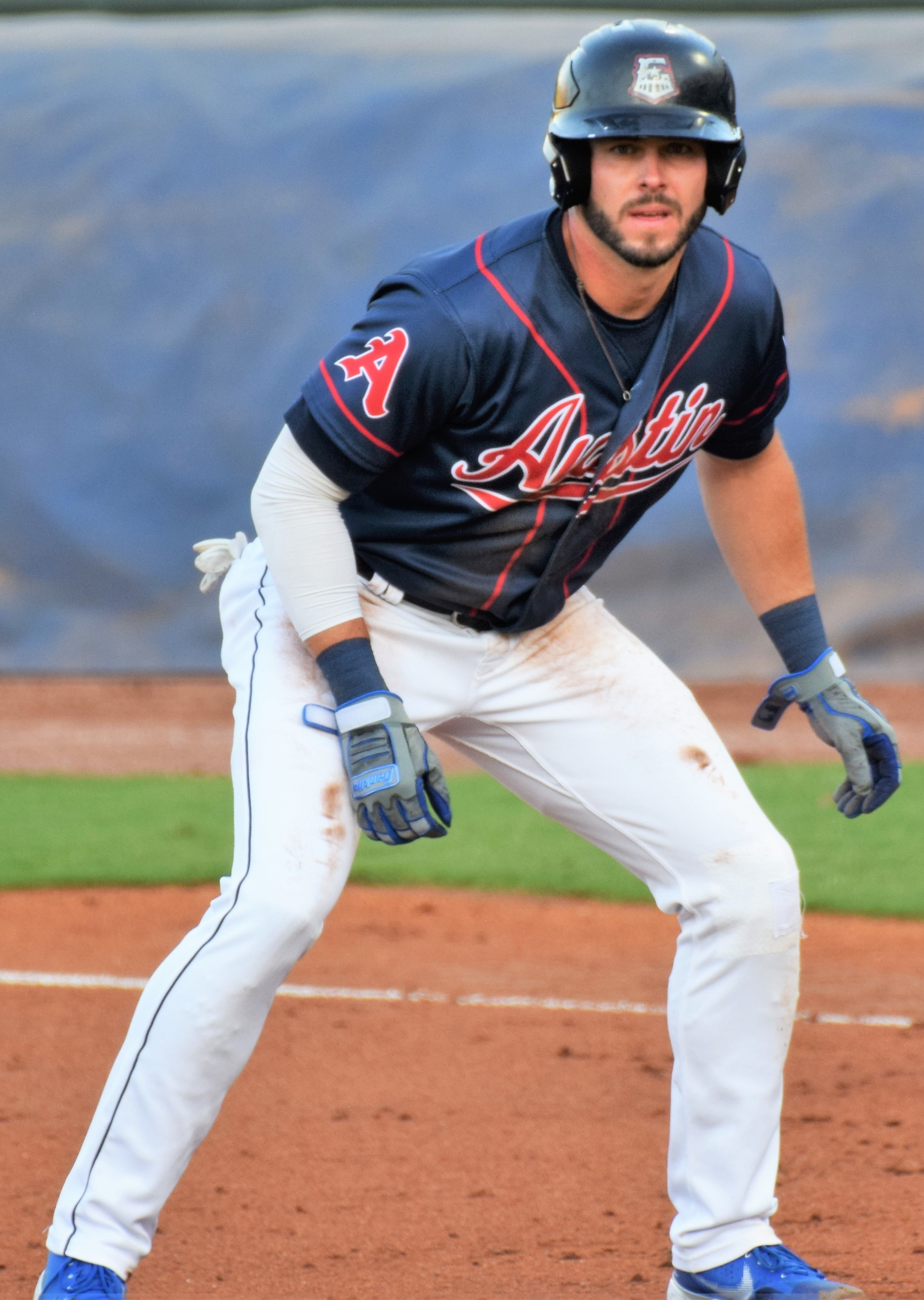
- Reks with the Round Rock Express in 2022
- Outfielder
- Born: November 12, 1993 (age 32); Chicago, Illinois, U.S.
- Batted: Left Threw: Right

Professional debut
- MLB: June 21, 2021, for the Los Angeles Dodgers
- KBO: July 24, 2022, for the Lotte Giants

Last appearance
- MLB: June 18, 2022, for the Texas Rangers
- KBO: July 8, 2023, for the Lotte Giants

MLB statistics
- Batting average: .205
- Home runs: 0
- Runs batted in: 3

KBO statistics
- Batting average: .290
- Home runs: 12
- Runs batted in: 64
- Stats at Baseball Reference

Teams
- Los Angeles Dodgers (2021); Texas Rangers (2022); Lotte Giants (2022–2023)

Zachary Joseph Reks (born November 12, 1993) is an American former professional baseball outfielder. He played in Major League Baseball (MLB) for the Los Angeles Dodgers and Texas Rangers, and in the KBO League for the Lotte Giants. He currently serves as the hitting coach for the Arizona Complex League Dodgers, Los Angeles' rookie-level affiliate.

== Amateur career ==
Reks attended Carl Sandburg High School in Orland Park, Illinois. He played one year of college baseball at the United States Air Force Academy before transferring to the University of Kentucky as a student. After not playing for two years he joined the Kentucky Wildcats baseball team as a walk-on in 2016. He played two seasons at Kentucky, before being drafted by the Los Angeles Dodgers in the 10th round of the 2017 Major League Baseball draft.

== Professional career ==
=== Los Angeles Dodgers ===
Reks spent his first professional season with the Ogden Raptors, Great Lakes Loons and Rancho Cucamonga Quakes, batting .317 with two home runs over 47 games between the three teams. He played 2018 with Rancho Cucamonga and the Tulsa Drillers, slashing .303/.374/.424 with five home runs and forty RBIs in 88 games. He started 2019 with Tulsa before being promoted to the Oklahoma City Dodgers. He played in 121 games total with a .291 average and 28 homers with 93 RBI.

The Dodgers added Reks to their 40-man roster after the 2020 season and was promoted to the majors for the first time on June 21, 2021. He had been hitting .341 with five homers and 19 RBI for Oklahoma City at the time of his call-up. He made his MLB debut the same day, as the starting left fielder against the San Diego Padres. He had two at-bats in the game, a strikeout and a lineout to center. He was returned to the minors the following day. Reks had 10 at-bats in six games for the Dodgers and struck out seven times. In the minors, he hit .280 in 87 games for Oklahoma City, with 19 homers and 67 RBI.

=== Texas Rangers ===
On November 22, 2021, Reks and Billy McKinney were traded to the Texas Rangers for cash considerations. He recorded his first MLB hit on April 30, 2022 off Bryce Elder of the Atlanta Braves. Reks was designated for assignment on July 16, 2022. He was released on July 20.

=== Lotte Giants ===
On July 20, 2022, Reks signed with the Lotte Giants of the KBO League. On November 18, 2022, Reks re-signed a one-year deal for the 2023 season worth $1.3 million.

In 2023, Reks played in 55 games for Lotte, but struggled with a knee injury which hobbled his production; in 203 at–bats, he hit .246/.338/.345 with 4 home runs and 30 RBI. On July 11, Reks was released by the Giants following the signing of Niko Goodrum.

=== San Diego Padres ===
On February 1, 2024, Reks signed a minor league contract with the San Diego Padres. In 64 appearances for the Double-A San Antonio Missions, he slashed .127/.278/.208 with three home runs, 19 RBI, and one stolen base. Reks elected free agency following the season on November 4.

== Coaching career ==
On February 28, 2025, the Los Angeles Dodgers hired Reks to serve as the hitting coach for their rookie-level affiliate, the Arizona Complex League Dodgers.
