= DJ Peters =

American baseball player (born 1995)

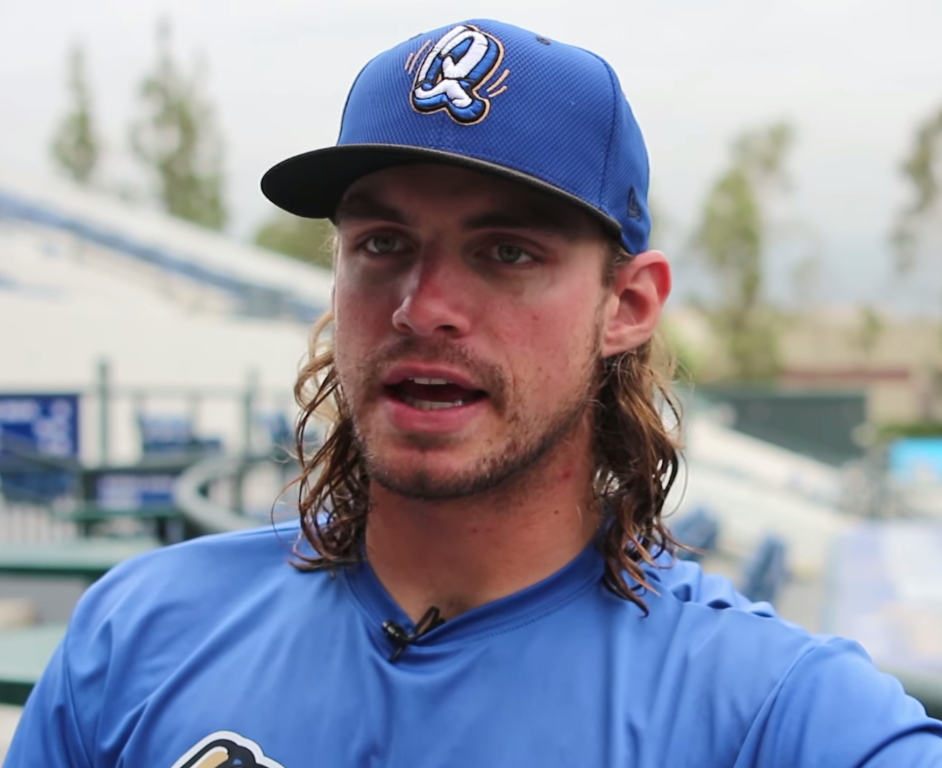
- Peters with the Rancho Cucamonga Quakes in 2017
- Outfielder
- Born: December 12, 1995 (age 30); Glendora, California, U.S.
- Batted: Right Threw: Right

Professional debut
- MLB: April 23, 2021, for the Los Angeles Dodgers
- KBO: April 2, 2022, for the Lotte Giants

Last appearance
- MLB: October 3, 2021, for the Texas Rangers
- KBO: July 14, 2022, for the Lotte Giants

MLB statistics
- Batting average: .197
- Home runs: 13
- Runs batted in: 38

KBO statistics
- Batting average: .228
- Home runs: 13
- Runs batted in: 48
- Stats at Baseball Reference

Teams
- Los Angeles Dodgers (2021); Texas Rangers (2021); Lotte Giants (2022)

Donald Scott Peters (born December 12, 1995) is an American former professional baseball outfielder. He played in Major League Baseball (MLB) for the Los Angeles Dodgers and Texas Rangers, and in the KBO League for the Lotte Giants.

== Amateur career ==
Peters attended Glendora High School in Glendora, California. He was drafted by the Chicago Cubs in the 36th round of the 2014 Major League Baseball draft, but did not sign and attended Western Nevada College, where he played college baseball. After one year at Western Nevada, he was drafted by the Texas Rangers in the 36th round of the 2015 MLB draft, but again did not sign and returned to Western Nevada. In 2016, he was the Scenic West Athletic Conference Player of the Year. After the season, Peters was drafted by the Los Angeles Dodgers in the fourth round of the 2016 Major League Baseball draft and signed, turning down a scholarship offer from California State University, Fullerton. Peters was initially committed to Cal State Fullerton out of high school.

== Professional career ==
=== Los Angeles Dodgers ===
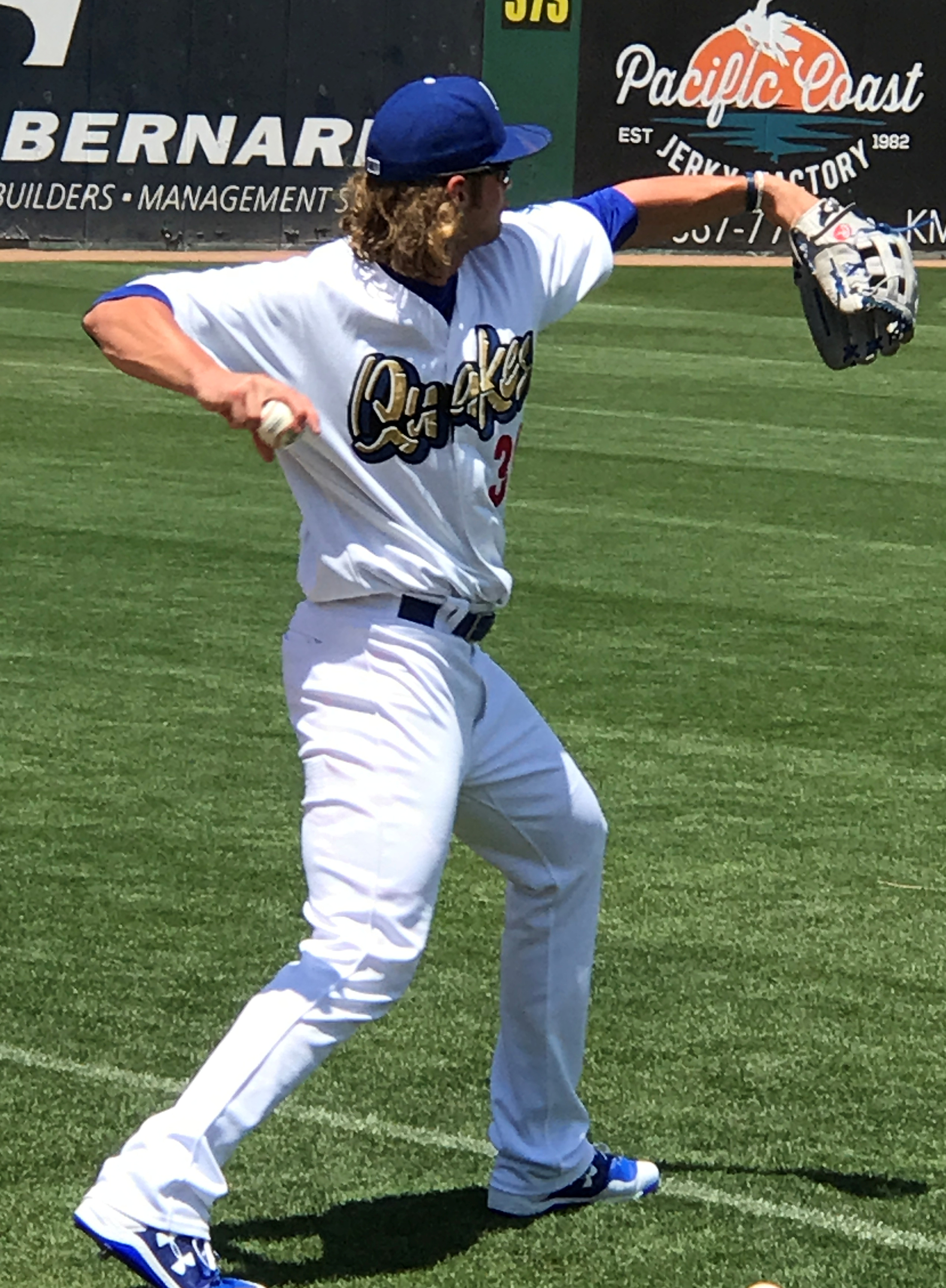
Peters with the Rancho Cucamonga Quakes in 2017

Peters spent his first professional season with the Ogden Raptors where he posted a .351 batting average with 13 home runs, 48 RBIs and a 1.052 OPS in 66 games. He spent 2017 with the Rancho Cucamonga Quakes and was named to the California League mid-season all-star team. In 132 games, he batted .276 with 27 home runs and 82 RBIs, and at the end of the season, was named to the postseason all-star team and was selected as the California League Most Valuable Player. Peters spent 2018 with the Tulsa Drillers, batting .236 with 29 home runs and sixty RBIs in 132 games. He returned to Tulsa to begin 2019 and was promoted to the AAA Oklahoma City Dodgers on June 27. Between the two levels, he hit .249/.358/.453 in 125 games with 23 homers and 81 RBI. He was added to the 40-man roster after the season.

On April 23, 2021, Peters was promoted to the major leagues for the first time. He made his MLB debut that day as a pinch hitter in the ninth inning and grounded out to third base from Nick Ramirez of the San Diego Padres. His first career hit was a double off Mike Mayers of the Los Angeles Angels on May 8, 2021. On May 27, 2021, Peters hit his first big league home run off Alex Wood of the San Francisco Giants. In 18 games with the Dodgers, he had five hits in 26 at-bats. Peters was designated for assignment by the Dodgers on July 29, 2021.

=== Texas Rangers ===
On August 2, 2021, Peters was claimed off waivers by the Texas Rangers. Over 52 games for Texas in 2021, Peters hit .198/.218/.426/.645 with 12 home runs and 34 RBI. On November 30, Peters was removed from the 40-man roster and sent outright to the Triple–A Round Rock Express.

=== Lotte Giants ===
On December 9, 2021, Peters signed a one-year, $680,000 deal with the Lotte Giants of the KBO League. He was waived by the Giants on July 18 after posting a .228 batting average with 13 home runs in 85 games.

=== Washington Nationals ===
On September 9, 2022, Peters signed a minor league deal with the Washington Nationals. He appeared in 13 games for the Triple-A Rochester Red Wings to close out the year, hitting .174/.216/.239 with no home runs and 4 RBI. Peters elected free agency following the season on November 10.

=== Detroit Tigers ===
On February 8, 2023, Peters signed a minor league contract with the Detroit Tigers organization. Peters converted into a pitcher for the 2023 season, and spent the year with the rookie–level Florida Complex League Tigers. In 17 appearances for the club, he registered a 6.23 ERA with 24 strikeouts across 21 2/3 innings of work. Peters elected free agency following the season on November 6.

=== Texas Rangers (second stint) ===
On January 31, 2024, Peters signed a minor league contract with the Texas Rangers. In 29 appearances split between the rookie-level Arizona Complex League Rangers and High-A Hickory Crawdads, he accumulated a 2-2 record and 4.70 ERA with 52 strikeouts and 2 saves across 38 1/3 innings pitched. Peters elected free agency following the season on November 4.

== Post-playing career ==
After his playing career ended, Peters moved to Oklahoma and is working in law enforcement.
