= Darien Núñez =

Cuban baseball player (born 1993)

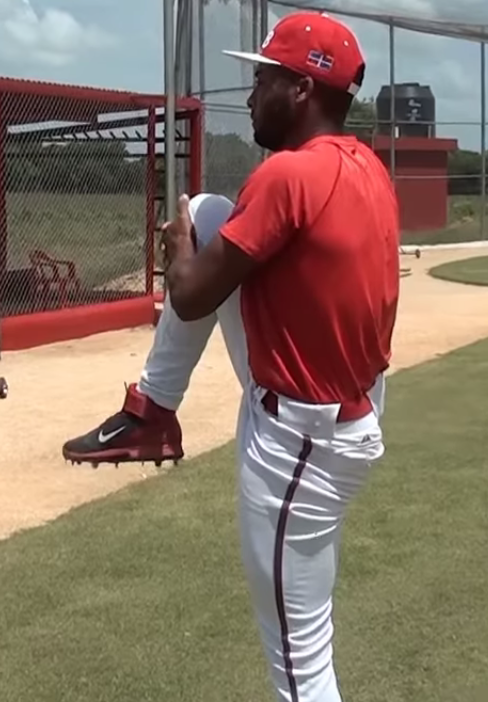
- Núñez in the Dominican Republic in 2017

Free agent
- Pitcher
- Born: March 19, 1993 (age 33); Las Tunas, Cuba
- Bats: Left Throws: Left

MLB debut
- July 9, 2021, for the Los Angeles Dodgers

MLB statistics (through 2021 season)
- Win–loss record: 0–1
- Earned run average: 8.22
- Strikeouts: 8
- Stats at Baseball Reference

Teams
- Los Angeles Dodgers (2021)

Darien A. Núñez (born March 19, 1993) is a Cuban professional baseball pitcher who is a free agent. He has previously played in Major League Baseball (MLB) for the Los Angeles Dodgers. The Dodgers signed him as an international free agent in 2018, and made his MLB debut with them in 2021.

== Career ==
=== Cuban career ===
Núñez pitched for the Cuban National team in the 2009 World Youth Baseball Championship and at the 2013 World Baseball Classic. Núñez pitched in the Cuban National Series from 2011 through 2015, with a 19–27 record and a 4.00 ERA. He requested his release in 2015 in order to legally play professional baseball. At the time of his release he was considered one of the three best pitchers in the Cuban league.

=== Los Angeles Dodgers ===
Núñez was signed by the Los Angeles Dodgers as an international free agent on April 16, 2018. In his professional debut season in 2018, he played in 21 games between the Dominican Summer League Dodgers, the AZL Dodgers, the rookie-level Ogden Raptors, and the Single-A Great Lakes Loons, and had a 2.23 ERA with 57 strikeouts in 36 1/3 innings. He spent most of 2019 with the High-A Rancho Cucamonga Quakes in the California League, pitching to a 1.75 ERA in 25 2/3 innings with 43 strikeouts. Núñez did not play in a game in 2020 due to the cancellation of the minor league season caused by the COVID-19 pandemic. He started the 2021 season with the Double-A Tulsa Drillers, but pitched only one game before a promotion to the Triple-A Oklahoma City Dodgers, where he posted a 2.79 ERA and led the team in strikeout rate (34.2 percent) through the beginning of July.

On July 8, 2021, Núñez was selected to the 40-man roster and called up to the majors for the first time. He made his debut by pitching two innings against the Arizona Diamondbacks on July 9. He allowed two runs (one earned) on one hit (a home run by Eduardo Escobar) while striking out three. His first MLB strikeout was of Daulton Varsho. Núñez pitched 7 2/3 innings for the Dodgers in 2021 over six games (including one appearance as an opener). He was 0–1 with a 8.22 ERA (seven earned runs allowed) while striking out eight, with four walks. He spent the majority of the season with Oklahoma City, where he was 7–0 with a 2.38 ERA in 32 games.

Núñez was assigned to Oklahoma City to start the 2022 season, where he worked 4 2/3 innings in three games, allowing four runs on five hits. After his third appearance he was placed on the minor league injured list and it was announced that he would need to undergo Tommy John surgery, ending his season. The Dodgers designated him for assignment on April 24, removing him from the 40-man roster.

=== San Francisco Giants ===
On April 27, 2022, Núñez was claimed off waivers by the San Francisco Giants, but released a couple of days later on April 29. He re-signed with San Francisco on a minor league deal on May 4.

Núñez returned to action in 2023, making rehab appearances for the rookie–level Arizona Complex League Giants, Single–A San Jose Giants before being activated and assigned to the Triple–A Sacramento River Cats. In 21 appearances between the three affiliates, he recorded a 5.64 ERA with 28 strikeouts across 22 1/3 innings pitched. Núñez elected free agency following the season on November 6, 2023.

=== Toros de Tijuana ===
On January 23, 2024, Núñez signed with the Toros de Tijuana of the Mexican League. In 9 appearances for the Toros, he struggled to a 6.14 ERA with 8 strikeouts across 7 1/3 innings pitched. On May 16, Núñez was released by Tijuana.

=== Acereros de Monclova ===
On June 3, 2024, Núñez signed with the Acereros de Monclova of the Mexican League. In 18 games for Monclova, he struggled to a 7.43 ERA with 17 strikeouts over 13 1/3 innings pitched. Núñez was released by the Acereros on October 7.

=== Algodoneros de Unión Laguna ===
On July 28, 2025, Núñez signed with the Algodoneros de Unión Laguna of the Mexican League. He made two appearances for the team, tossing 2 1/3 scoreless innings of relief with two strikeouts. Núñez was released by the Algondoneros on March 5, 2026.
