= Hyun-il Choi =

South Korean baseball player (born 2000)

Free agent
- Pitcher
- Born: May 27, 2000 (age 25); Seoul, South Korea
- Bats: Right Throws: Right

Hyun-il Choi (Korean: 최현일; born May 27, 2000) is a South Korean professional baseball pitcher who is a free agent.

== Career ==
=== Los Angeles Dodgers ===
Choi was signed by the Los Angeles Dodgers in 2018 for a $300,000 signing bonus as a 17-year old High School pitcher from South Korea. He made his professional debut in 2019 with in the Arizona League, where he was 5–1 with a 2.63 ERA in 14 games (11 starts). He struck out 71 in 65 innings.

Choi missed the 2020 season as a result of the cancellation of the minor league season due to the COVID-19 pandemic and was assigned to the Rancho Cucamonga Quakes to start the 2021 season before being promoted to High-A Great Lakes Loons at mid-season. Across the two levels, he was 8–6 with a 3.72 ERA in 24 games (11 starts) and struck out 106 batters in 106 1/3 innings while only walking 18. The Dodgers recognized him by awarding him the organizations Branch Rickey Minor League Pitcher of the Year Award. Choi only pitched in one game for Great Lakes in 2022 before being shut down with forearm inflammation. He returned to Great Lakes in 2023, pitching in 16 games (13 starts) with a 4–5 record and 3.75 ERA.

Choi began the 2024 season with the Double-A Tulsa Drillers before an early call-up to the Triple-A Oklahoma City Baseball Club. He made 24 appearances (21) starts between the two teams, with a 5–11 record and 4.92 ERA.

=== Washington Nationals ===
On December 11, 2024, Choi was selected by the Washington Nationals in the minor league phase of the Rule 5 draft. He made 30 appearances (20 starts) for the Double-A Harrisburg Senators and Triple-A Rochester Red Wings in 2025, accumulating a 7-8 record and 4.87 ERA with 88 strikeouts across 116 1/3 innings pitched. Choi elected free agency following the season on November 6, 2025.
