= 2021 Miami Marlins season =

2021 Miami Marlins
- League: National League
- Division: East
- Ballpark: LoanDepot Park
- City: Miami, Florida
- Record: 67–95 (.414)
- Divisional place: 4th
- Owners: Bruce Sherman and Derek Jeter
- General managers: Kim Ng
- Managers: Don Mattingly
- Television: Bally Sports Florida; Bally Sports Sun (English: Paul Severino, Craig Minervini, Todd Hollandsworth) (Spanish: Raul Striker Jr., Cookie Rojas)
- Radio: WINZ; Miami Marlins Radio Network (English) (Dave Van Horne, Glenn Geffner); WAQI (Spanish) (Luis Quintana)

The 2021 Miami Marlins season was the 29th season for the Major League Baseball (MLB) franchise in the National League and the tenth as the "Miami" Marlins. The Marlins played their home games at LoanDepot Park as members of the National League East. The Marlins did not qualify for the playoffs, finishing fourth in their division with a 67–95 record.

== Regular season ==
=== Season standings ===
NL East
Team	W	L	Pct.	GB	Home	Road
Atlanta Braves	88	73	.547	—	42‍–‍38	46‍–‍35
Philadelphia Phillies	82	80	.506	6½	47‍–‍34	35‍–‍46
New York Mets	77	85	.475	11½	47‍–‍34	30‍–‍51
Miami Marlins	67	95	.414	21½	42‍–‍39	25‍–‍56
Washington Nationals	65	97	.401	23½	35‍–‍46	30‍–‍51

Division leaders
Team	W	L	Pct.
San Francisco Giants	107	55	.660
Milwaukee Brewers	95	67	.586
Atlanta Braves	88	73	.547

Wild Card teams (Top 2 teams qualify for postseason)
Team	W	L	Pct.	GB
Los Angeles Dodgers	106	56	.654	+16
St. Louis Cardinals	90	72	.556	—
Cincinnati Reds	83	79	.512	7
Philadelphia Phillies	82	80	.506	8
San Diego Padres	79	83	.488	11
New York Mets	77	85	.475	13
Colorado Rockies	74	87	.460	15½
Chicago Cubs	71	91	.438	19
Miami Marlins	67	95	.414	23
Washington Nationals	65	97	.401	25
Pittsburgh Pirates	61	101	.377	29
Arizona Diamondbacks	52	110	.321	38

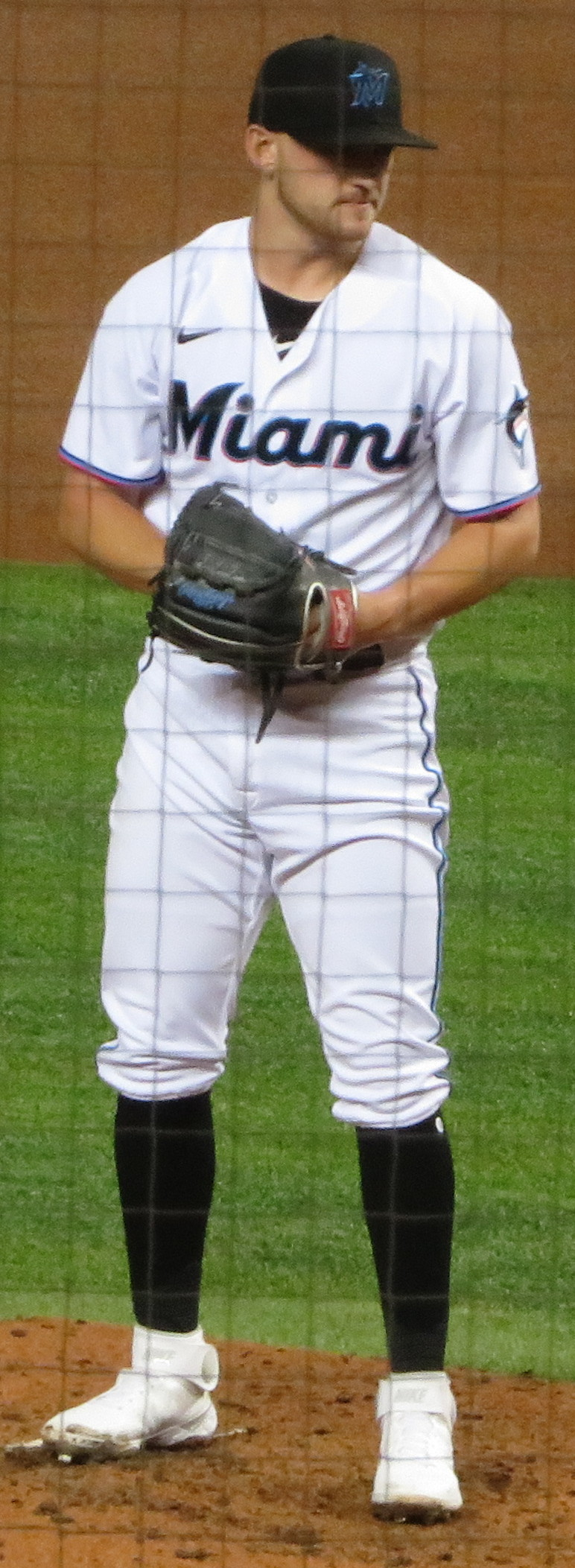
Paul Campell was suspended for 80 games for drugs.

=== Record vs. opponents ===
2021 National League record Source: MLB Standings Grid – 2021
Team	AZ	ATL	CHC	CIN	COL	LAD	MIA	MIL	NYM	PHI	PIT	SD	SF	STL	WSH	AL
Arizona	—	3–4	2–4	5–1	9–10	3–16	2–5	1–6	1–5	4–3	4–2	8–11	2–17	1–6	3–4	4–16
Atlanta	4–3	—	5–2	4–3	2–4	2–4	11–8	3–3	10–9	10–9	4–3	4–2	3–3	6–1	14–5	6–14
Chicago	4–2	2–5	—	8–11	3–3	4–3	1–5	4–15	4–3	2–5	14–5	5–1	1–6	9–10	4–3	6–14
Cincinnati	1–5	3–4	11–8	—	5–2	3–3	5–2	9–10	3–3	4–2	13–6	1–6	1–6	10–9	5–2	9–11
Colorado	10–9	4–2	3–3	2–5	—	6–13	4–2	2–5	2–5	5–2	4–2	11–8	4–15	3–4	4–2	10–10
Los Angeles	16–3	4–2	3–4	3–3	13–6	—	3–4	4–3	6–1	4–2	6–0	12–7	9–10	4–3	7–0	12–8
Miami	5–2	8–11	5–1	2–5	2–4	4–3	—	3–3	9–10	10–9	2–5	3–4	3–4	0–6	8–11	3–17
Milwaukee	6–1	3–3	15–4	10–9	5–2	3–4	3–3	—	4–2	2–5	14–5	5–2	4–3	8–11	5–1	8–12
New York	5–1	9–10	3–4	3–3	5–2	1–6	10–9	2–4	—	9–10	3–4	4–3	1–5	2–5	11–8	9–11
Philadelphia	3–4	9–10	5–2	2–4	2–5	2–4	9–10	5–2	10–9	—	4–3	4–2	2–4	4–3	13–6	8–12
Pittsburgh	2–4	3–4	5–14	6–13	2–4	0–6	5–2	5–14	4–3	3–4	—	3–4	4–3	7–12	2–4	10–10
San Diego	11–8	2–4	1–5	6–1	8–11	7–12	4–3	2–5	3–4	2–4	4–3	—	8–11	3–3	4–3	14–6
San Francisco	17–2	3–3	6–1	6–1	15–4	10–9	4–3	3–4	5–1	4–2	3–4	11–8	—	2–4	5–2	13–7
St. Louis	6–1	1–6	10–9	9–10	4–3	3–4	6–0	11–8	5–2	3–4	12–7	3–3	4–2	—	2–4	11–9
Washington	4–3	5–14	3–4	2–5	2–4	0–7	11–8	1–5	8–11	6–13	4–2	3–4	2–5	4–2	—	10–10

=== Game log ===
2021 game log: 67–95 (Home: 42–39; Away: 25–56)
April: 11–14 (Home: 4–7; Away: 7–7)

#	Date	Opponent	Score	Win	Loss	Save	Attendance	Record	Box/Streak
1	April 1	Rays	0–1	Thompson (1–0)	**García** (0–1)	Castillo (1)	7,062	0–1	L1
2	April 2	Rays	4–6	Kittredge (1–0)	**Bass** (0–1)	Castillo (2)	6,115	0–2	L2
3	April 3	Rays	12–7	**Bleier** (1–0)	Archer (0–1)	—	6,179	1–2	W1
4	April 5	Cardinals	1–4	Ponce de Leon (1–0)	**Rogers** (0–1)	Reyes (1)	4,609	1–3	L1
5	April 6	Cardinals	2–4	Helsley (1–0)	**Alcántara** (0–1)	Reyes (2)	4,982	1–4	L2
6	April 7	Cardinals	0–7	Flaherty (1–0)	**López** (0–1)	—	5,244	1–5	L3
7	April 8	@ Mets	2–3	Díaz (1–0)	**Bass** (0–2)	—	8,492	1–6	L4
8	April 10	@ Mets	3–0	**Rogers** (1–1)	deGrom (0–1)	**García** (1)	8,419	2–6	W1
–	April 11	@ Mets	Suspended (rain, continuation date: August 31)						
9	April 12	@ Braves	5–3 (10)	**García** (1–1)	Webb (0–1)	—	11,830	3–6	W2
10	April 13	@ Braves	14–8	**Curtiss** (1–0)	Fried (0–1)	—	12,036	4–6	W3
11	April 14	@ Braves	6–5 (10)	**Curtiss** (2–0)	Matzek (0–1)	**García** (2)	12,480	5–6	W4
12	April 15	@ Braves	6–7	Minter (1–0)	**Floro** (0–1)	—	11,739	5–7	L1
13	April 16	Giants	4–1	**Bass** (1–2)	Wisler (0–2)	**García** (3)	5,734	6–7	W1
14	April 17	Giants	7–6 (10)	**García** (2–1)	García (0–1)	—	6,014	7–7	W2
15	April 18	Giants	0–1	Wood (1–0)	**López** (0–2)	Rogers (1)	6,129	7–8	L1
16	April 20	Orioles	5–7	Harvey (1–1)	**Neidert** (0–1)	Valdez (4)	4,540	7–9	L2
17	April 21	Orioles	3–0	**Rogers** (2–1)	Zimmermann (1–2)	**García** (4)	4,028	8–9	W1
18	April 22	@ Giants	0–3	Sanchez (1–1)	**Castano** (0–1)	McGee (7)	4,580	8–10	L1
19	April 23	@ Giants	3–5	Wood (2–0)	**Alcántara** (0–2)	—	6,657	8–11	L2
20	April 24	@ Giants	5–2	**Floro** (1–1)	Santos (0–1)	—	8,282	9–11	W1
21	April 25	@ Giants	3–4	Webb (1–1)	**Campbell** (0–1)	Rogers (1)	7,572	9–12	L1
22	April 26	@ Brewers	8–0	**Rogers** (3–1)	Burnes (2–2)	—	10,749	10–12	W1
23	April 27	@ Brewers	4–5	Houser (2–2)	**Curtiss** (2–1)	Hader (5)	10,620	10–13	L1
24	April 28	@ Brewers	6–2	**Alcántara** (1–2)	Godley (0–1)	—	11,564	11–13	W1
25	April 30	@ Nationals	1–2 (10)	Hand (2–0)	**García** (2–2)	—	8,295	11–14	L1

May: 13–14 (Home: 8–5; Away: 5–9)

#	Date	Opponent	Score	Win	Loss	Save	Attendance	Record	Box/Streak
26	May 1	@ Nationals	2–7	Corbin (1–3)	**Campbell** (0–2)	—	8,510	11–15	L2
27	May 2	@ Nationals	1–3	Scherzer (2–2)	**Rogers** (3–2)	—	8,482	11–16	L3
28	May 4	Diamondbacks	9–3	**Bleier** (2–0)	Ginkel (0–1)	—	3,893	12–16	W1
29	May 5	Diamondbacks	8–0	**Holloway** (1–0)	Weaver (1–3)	—	3,573	13–16	W2
30	May 6	Diamondbacks	3–1	**Floro** (2–1)	Bukauskas (1–1)	**García** (5)	4,049	14–16	W3
31	May 7	Brewers	6–1	**Rogers** (4–2)	Suter (2–2)	—	5,507	15–16	W4
32	May 8	Brewers	2–6	Houser (3–3)	**Castano** (0–2)	—	5,764	15–17	L1
33	May 9	Brewers	1–2 (10)	Hader (3–0)	**Bass** (1–3)	Rasmussen (1)	5,105	15–18	L2
34	May 10	@ Diamondbacks	2–5	Weaver (2–3)	**Holloway** (1–1)	Crichton (4)	6,307	15–19	L3
35	May 11	@ Diamondbacks	3–11	Bumgarner (4–2)	**López** (0–3)	—	5,560	15–20	L4
36	May 12	@ Diamondbacks	3–2	**Poteet** (1–0)	Peacock (1–1)	**García** (6)	5,714	16–20	W1
37	May 13	@ Diamondbacks	5–1	**Rogers** (5–2)	Kelly (2–4)	—	5,967	17–20	W2
38	May 14	@ Dodgers	6–9	Kershaw (6–3)	**Alcántara** (1–3)	Jansen (7)	15,915	17–21	L1
39	May 15	@ Dodgers	0–7	Bauer (4–2)	**Holloway** (1–2)	—	16,116	17–22	L2
40	May 16	@ Dodgers	3–2	**López** (1–3)	Uceta (0–2)	**García** (7)	15,976	18–22	W1
41	May 18	@ Phillies	3–8	Bradley (1–1)	**Floro** (2–2)	—	11,114	18–23	L1
42	May 19	@ Phillies	3–1	**Rogers** (6–2)	Eflin (2–3)	**García** (8)	11,549	19–23	W1
43	May 20	@ Phillies	6–0	**Alcántara** (2–3)	Hale (0–2)	—	11,503	20–23	W2
44	May 21	Mets	5–6 (12)	Smith (1–0)	**Cimber** (0–1)	Barnes (1)	7,282	20–24	L1
45	May 22	Mets	3–1	**García** (3–2)	Smith (1–1)	—	7,513	21–24	W1
46	May 23	Mets	5–1	**Poteet** (2–0)	Yamamoto (1–1)	—	7,945	22–24	W2
47	May 24	Phillies	9–6	**Cimber** (1–1)	Eflin (2–4)	Floro (1)	4,527	23–24	W3
48	May 25	Phillies	0–2	Velasquez (2–0)	**Alcántara** (2–4)	Neris (8)	4,864	23–25	L1
49	May 26	Phillies	4–2	**Detwiler** (1–0)	Coonrod (0–1)	**García** (9)	4,760	24–25	W1
50	May 27	Phillies	2–3	Alvarado (4–0)	**García** (3–3)	Neris (9)	4,932	24–26	L1
51	May 28	@ Red Sox	2–5 (6)	Pérez (3–2)	**Poteet** (2–1)	Ottavino (2)	9,005	24–27	L2
52	May 29	@ Red Sox	1–3	Eovaldi (6–2)	**Rogers** (6–3)	Barnes (12)	25,089	24–28	L3
—	May 30	@ Red Sox	Postponed (rain, Makeup date: June 7)						

June: 10–17 (Home: 6–6; Away: 4–11)

#	Date	Opponent	Score	Win	Loss	Save	Attendance	Record	Box/Streak
53	June 1	@ Blue Jays	1–5	Ray (3–2)	**Alcántara** (2–5)	—	5,321	24–29	L4
54	June 2	@ Blue Jays	5–6	Castro (1–1)	**García** (3–4)	—	5,385	24–30	L5
55	June 3	@ Pirates	3–5	Crick (1–0)	**Floro** (2–3)	Rodríguez (7)	4,192	24–31	L6
56	June 4	@ Pirates	2–9	Underwood Jr. (2–2)	**Poteet** (2–2)	Stratton (1)	8,044	24–32	L7
57	June 5	@ Pirates	7–8 (12)	Holmes (2–0)	**Cimber** (1–2)	—	8,714	24–33	L8
58	June 6	@ Pirates	3–1	**Alcántara** (3–5)	Kuhl (0–3)	**García** (10)	5,477	25–33	W1
59	June 7	@ Red Sox	3–5	Sawamura (2–0)	**Thompson** (0–1)	Ottavino (3)	25,374	25–34	L1
60	June 8	Rockies	6–2	**López** (2–3)	Senzatela (2–6)	—	4,863	26–34	W1
61	June 9	Rockies	3–4	Gomber (5–5)	**Garrett** (0–1)	Bard (8)	4,563	26–35	L1
62	June 10	Rockies	11–4	**Rogers** (7–3)	Gonzalez (2–4)	—	4,965	27–35	W1
63	June 11	Braves	4–3	**Alcántara** (4–5)	Morton (5–3)	**García** (11)	6,595	28–35	W2
64	June 12	Braves	4–2	**Thompson** (1–1)	Fried (3–4)	**Floro** (2)	8,158	29–35	W3
65	June 13	Braves	4–6	Smyly (3–3)	**López** (2–4)	Smith (12)	8,448	29–36	L1
66	June 14	@ Cardinals	2–4	Gallegos (4–1)	**Floro** (2–4)	Reyes (17)	24,281	29–37	L2
67	June 15	@ Cardinals	1–2	Reyes (4–2)	**García** (3–5)	—	24,736	29–38	L3
68	June 16	@ Cardinals	0–1	Helsley (4–4)	**Alcántara** (4–6)	—	24,682	29–39	L4
69	June 18	@ Cubs	10–2	**Curtiss** (3–1)	Davies (4–4)	—	32,505	30–39	W1
70	June 19	@ Cubs	11–1	**López** (3–4)	Arrieta (5–8)	—	35,846	31–39	W2
71	June 20	@ Cubs	0–2	Mills (3–1)	**Thompson** (1–2)	Kimbrel (20)	37,158	31–40	L1
72	June 22	Blue Jays	1–2	Mayza (2–1)	**García** (3–6)	Romano (4)	6,291	31–41	L2
73	June 23	Blue Jays	1–3	Ray (5–3)	**Rogers** (7–4)	Romano (5)	6,164	31–42	L3
74	June 24	Nationals	3–7	Ross (4–7)	**Poteet** (2–3)	—	5,255	31–43	L4
75	June 25	Nationals	11–2	**López** (4–4)	Lester (1–3)	—	4,749	32–43	W1
76	June 26	Nationals	3–2	**Thompson** (2–2)	Corbin (5–6)	**García** (12)	6,305	33–43	W2
77	June 27	Nationals	1–5	Scherzer (7–4)	**Alcántara** (4–7)	—	7,349	33–44	L1
78	June 29	@ Phillies	3–4	Velasquez (3–2)	**Rogers** (7–5)	Alvarado (3)	18,079	33–45	L2
79	June 30	@ Phillies	11–6	**Pop** (1–0)	Nola (5–5)	—	17,190	34–45	W1

July: 10–15 (Home: 6–7; Away: 4–8)

#	Date	Opponent	Score	Win	Loss	Save	Attendance	Record	Box/Streak
—	July 1	@ Phillies	Postponed (rain, makeup date: July 16)						
80	July 2	@ Braves	0–1	Smyly (6–3)	**López** (4–5)	Smith (17)	38,203	34–46	L1
81	July 3	@ Braves	3–2	**Alcántara** (5–7)	Muller (1–2)	**García** (13)	38,526	35–46	W1
82	July 4	@ Braves	7–8 (10)	Smith (3–5)	**Bass** (1–4)	—	34,485	35–47	L1
83	July 5	Dodgers	5–4	**Hess** (1–0)	González (3–1)	**Bender** (1)	15,290	36–47	W1
84	July 6	Dodgers	2–1 (10)	**Hess** (2–0)	Treinen (2–4)	—	7,993	37–47	W2
85	July 7	Dodgers	9–6	**Bender** (1–0)	Uceta (0–3)	—	9,523	38–47	W3
86	July 8	Dodgers	1–6	Urías (11–3)	**Alcántara** (5–8)	—	12,031	38–48	L1
87	July 9	Braves	0–5	Morton (8–3)	**Bass** (1–5)	—	7,446	38–49	L2
88	July 10	Braves	4–5	Fried (6–5)	**Rogers** (7–6)	Smith (18)	12,178	38–50	L3
89	July 11	Braves	7–4	**López** (5–5)	Anderson (5–5)	—	9,456	39–50	W1
90	July 16 (1)	@ Phillies	2–5 (7)	Bradley (4–1)	**Alcántara** (5–9)	Suárez (3)	N/A	39–51	L1
91	July 16 (2)	@ Phillies	7–0 (7)	**Holloway** (2–2)	Eflin (4–7)	—	28,712	40–51	W1
92	July 17 (Note: game suspended in the top of the 10th inning with the game tied 2–2; to be completed on July 18 before the regularly scheduled game)/18	@ Phillies	2–4 (10)	Alvarado (6–0)	**García** (3–7)	—	21,390	40–52	L1
93	July 18	@ Phillies	4–7	Wheeler (7–5)	**Bender** (1–1)	Neris (12)	20,588	40–53	L2
94	July 19	@ Nationals	1–18	Lester (3–4)	**Detwiler** (1–1)	—	15,283	40–54	L3
95	July 20	@ Nationals	3–6	Finnegan (4–2)	**Bleier** (2–1)	Hand (20)	17,362	40–55	L4
96	July 21	@ Nationals	3–1 (10)	**Floro** (3–4)	Hand (5–3)	**García** (14)	21,058	41–55	W1
97	July 22	Padres	2–3	Snell (4–3)	**Holloway** (2–3)	Melancon (29)	10,977	41–56	L1
98	July 23	Padres	2–5	Musgrove (6–7)	**Thompson** (2–3)	Melancon (30)	9,264	41–57	L2
99	July 24	Padres	3–2	**Garrett** (1–1)	Hill (5–5)	**García** (15)	13,207	42–57	W1
100	July 25	Padres	9–3	**Bender** (2–1)	Darvish (7–5)	—	12,765	43–57	W2
101	July 27	@ Orioles	7–3	**Alcántara** (6–9)	Watkins (2–1)	—	10,098	44–57	W3
102	July 28	@ Orioles	7–8	Scott (4–4)	**Okert** (0–1)	—	8,363	44–58	L1
103	July 30	Yankees	1–3	Taillon (7–4)	**Thompson** (2–4)	Chapman (21)	18,462	44–59	L2
104	July 31	Yankees	2–4	Luetge (4–1)	**Hess** (2–1)	Loáisiga (3)	25,767	44–60	L3

August: 11–18 (Home: 10–7; Away: 1–11)

#	Date	Opponent	Score	Win	Loss	Save	Attendance	Record	Box/Streak
105	August 1	Yankees	1–3	Rodríguez (2–3)	**Bass** (1–6)	Chapman (22)	20,758	44–61	L4
106	August 2	Mets	6–3	**Luzardo** (3–4)	Megill (1–1)	**Floro** (3)	8,771	45–61	W1
107	August 3	Mets	5–4	**Neidert** (1–1)	Walker (7–6)	**Floro** (4)	7,682	46–61	W2
108	August 4	Mets	3–5	Castro (3–3)	**Bass** (1–7)	May (4)	9,760	46–62	L1
109	August 5	Mets	4–2	**Detwiler** (2–1)	Familia (5–2)	**Bender** (2)	9,745	47–62	W1
110	August 6	@ Rockies	2–14	Márquez (10–8)	**Alcántara** (6–10)	—	28,281	47–63	L1
111	August 7	@ Rockies	4–7	Gomber (9–6)	**Luzardo** (3–5)	Bard (18)	39,986	47–64	L2
112	August 8	@ Rockies	8–13	Freeland (3–6)	**Hess** (2–2)	—	34,677	47–65	L3
113	August 9	@ Padres	3–8	Musgrove (8–7)	**Thompson** (2–5)	—	26,841	47–66	L4
114	August 10	@ Padres	5–6	Johnson (3–2)	**Bleier** (2–2)	Melancon (34)	32,060	47–67	L5
115	August 11	@ Padres	7–0	**Alcántara** (7–10)	Weathers (4–5)	—	29,753	48–67	W1
116	August 13	Cubs	14–10	**Luzardo** (4–5)	Alzolay (4–13)	—	11,728	49–67	W2
117	August 14	Cubs	5–4	**Floro** (4–4)	Heuer (4–2)	**Bender** (3)	11,225	50–67	W3
118	August 15	Cubs	4–1	**Campbell** (1–2)	Mills (5–5)	**Floro** (5)	10,262	51–67	W4
119	August 16	Braves	2–12	Toussaint (2–2)	**Garrett** (1–2)	—	6,442	51–68	L1
120	August 17	Braves	0–2	Martin (2–3)	**Alcántara** (7–11)	Smith (26)	6,070	51–69	L2
121	August 18	Braves	9–11	Morton (12–4)	**Luzardo** (4–6)	—	6,871	51–70	L3
122	August 19	@ Reds	1–6	Castillo (7–12)	**Neidert** (1–2)	—	11,581	51–71	L4
123	August 20	@ Reds	3–5	Gray (5–6)	**Hernández** (0–1)	Givens (4)	19,106	51–72	L5
124	August 21	@ Reds	4–7	Cessa (4–2)	**Bender** (2–2)	Lorenzen (2)	34,433	51–73	L6
125	August 22	@ Reds	1–3	Gutierrez (9–4)	**Alcántara** (7–12)	Lorenzen (3)	17,797	51–74	L7
126	August 24	Nationals	1–5	Fedde (6–8)	**Luzardo** (4–7)	—	5,394	51–75	L8
127	August 25	Nationals	4–3 (10)	**Floro** (5–4)	Finnegan (4–5)	—	6,237	52–75	W1
128	August 26	Nationals	7–5	**Hernández** (1–1)	Corbin (7–13)	**Floro** (6)	5,447	53–75	W2
129	August 27	Reds	0–6	Miley (11–4)	**Thompson** (2–6)	—	7,119	53–76	L1
130	August 28	Reds	6–1	**Alcántara** (8–12)	Gutierrez (9–5)	—	10,407	54–76	W1
131	August 29	Reds	2–1	**Luzardo** (5–7)	Mahle (10–5)	**Floro** (7)	11,019	55–76	W2
132	August 31 (1)	@ Mets	5–6	Familia (1–0)	**Floro** (0–1)	—	8,199	55–77	L1
133	August 31 (2)	@ Mets	1–3 (7)	Loup (4–0)	**Cabrera** (0–1)	Díaz (27)	18,101	55–78	L2

September/October: 12–17 (Home: 8–7; Away: 4–10)

#	Date	Opponent	Score	Win	Loss	Save	Attendance	Record	Box/Streak
–	September 1	@ Mets	Postponed (rain, makeup date: September 28)						
134	September 2	@ Mets	3–4	Familia (9–3)	**Alcántara** (8–13)	Díaz (28)	23,737	55–79	L3
135	September 3	Phillies	10–3	**Okert** (1–1)	Gibson (10–6)	—	7,073	56–79	W1
136	September 4	Phillies	3–2	**Bass** (2–7)	Bradley (7–3)	**Floro** (8)	9,256	57–79	W2
137	September 5	Phillies	3–4 (10)	Kennedy (1–0)	**Floro** (5–6)	—	8,082	57–80	L1
138	September 7	Mets	4–9	Carrasco (1–2)	**Campbell** (1–3)	—	5,848	57–81	L2
139	September 8	Mets	2–1 (10)	**Bender** (3–2)	Díaz (5–6)	—	6,378	58–81	W1
140	September 9	Mets	3–2	**Bleier** (3–2)	Familia (9–4)	**Floro** (9)	8,075	59–81	W2
141	September 10	@ Braves	2–6	Anderson (7–5)	**Rogers** (7–7)	—	33,850	59–82	L1
142	September 11	@ Braves	6–4	**Bass** (3–7)	Rodríguez (4–4)	**Floro** (10)	35,250	60–82	W1
143	September 12	@ Braves	3–5	Webb (4–2)	**Bass** (3–8)	Smith (32)	27,847	60–83	L1
144	September 13	@ Nationals	3–0	**Alcántara** (9–13)	Espino (4–5)	**Floro** (11)	19,759	61–83	W1
145	September 14	@ Nationals	2–8	Fedde (7–9)	**Luzardo** (5–8)	—	17,030	61–84	L1
146	September 15	@ Nationals	8–6	**Campbell** (2–3)	Finnegan (5–7)	**Floro** (12)	16,309	62–84	W1
147	September 17	Pirates	1–2	Crowe (4–7)	**Hernández** (1–2)	Stratton (6)	7,884	62–85	L1
148	September 18	Pirates	3–6	Wilson (3–7)	**Cabrera** (0–2)	—	12,300	62–86	L2
149	September 19	Pirates	6–5 (10)	**Okert** (2–1)	Kuhl (5–7)	—	9,870	63–86	W1
150	September 20	Nationals	8–7 (10)	**Floro** (6–6)	Clay (0–6)	—	5,383	64–86	W2
151	September 21	Nationals	1–7	Rogers (2–0)	**Rogers** (7–8)	—	5,926	64–87	L1
152	September 22	Nationals	5–7	Gray (1–2)	**Hernández** (1–3)	Rainey (2)	5,908	64–88	L2
153	September 24	@ Rays	0–8	Yarbrough (9–6)	**Cabrera** (0–3)	—	15,340	64–89	L3
154	September 25	@ Rays	3–7	McClanahan (10–6)	**Alcántara** (9–14)	—	23,783	64–90	L4
155	September 26	@ Rays	2–3	Baz (2–0)	**Luzardo** (5–9)	Anderson (1)	20,826	64–91	L5
156	September 28 (1)	@ Mets	2–5 (7)	Stroman (10–13)	**Thompson** (2–7)	Díaz (31)	N/A	64–92	L6
157	September 28 (2)	@ Mets	1–2 (9)	Hand (6–7)	**Bass** (3–9)	—	20,647	64–93	L7
158	September 29	@ Mets	3–2	**Okert** (3–1)	Lugo (4–3)	**Floro** (13)	22,610	65–93	W1
159	September 30	@ Mets	3–12	Hill (7–8)	**Guenther** (0–1)	—	24,312	65–94	L1
160	October 1	Phillies	0–5	Suárez (8–5)	**Alcántara** (9–15)	—	8,469	65–95	L2
161	October 2	Phillies	3–1	**Luzardo** (6–9)	Crouse (0–2)	**Floro** (14)	9,655	66–95	W1
162	October 3	Phillies	5–4	**Zach Thompson** (3–7)	Héctor Neris (4–7)	**Floro** (15)	9,149	67–95	W2

Legend: = Win = Loss = Postponement
Bold = Marlins team member

== Roster ==
2021 Miami Marlins
Roster
Pitchers: 22 Sandy Alcántara; 52 Anthony Bass; 59 Andrew Bellatti; 80 Anthony Bender; 35 Richard Bleier; 79 Edward Cabrera; 53 Paul Campbell; 20 Daniel Castano; 90 Adam Cimber; 39 John Curtiss; 54 Ross Detwiler; 36 Dylan Floro; 93 Yimi García; 60 Braxton Garrett; 66 Sean Guenther; 58 Preston Guilmet; 75 Jorge Guzmán; 57 Elieser Hernández; 41 David Hess; 78 Jordan Holloway; 49 Pablo López; 44 Jesús Luzardo; 70 Luís Madero; 37 Bryan Mitchell; 50 Shawn Morimando; 29 Nick Neidert; 48 Steven Okert; 56 Zach Pop; 72 Cody Poteet; 47 Austin Pruitt; 28 Trevor Rogers; 74 Zach Thompson; 46 Taylor Williams	Catchers: 38 Jorge Alfaro; 84 Nick Fortes; 86 Payton Henry; 23 Alex Jackson; 7 Sandy León; 17 Chad Wallach; Infielders: 24 Jesús Aguilar; 65 Eddy Alvarez; 15 Brian Anderson; 5 Jon Berti; 2 Jazz Chisholm Jr.; 61 José Devers; 1 Isan Díaz; 68 Lewin Díaz; 9 Deven Marrero; 89 Luis Marté; 12 Joe Panik; 19,21 Miguel Rojas	Outfielders: 25 Lewis Brinson; 26 Garrett Cooper; 77 Bryan De La Cruz; 23 Corey Dickerson; 14 Adam Duvall; 3 Monte Harrison; 6 Starling Marte; 92 Brian Miller; 76 Jesús Sánchez; 34 Magneuris Sierra	Manager: 8 Don Mattingly; Coaches: 85 Rob Flippo (bullpen coordinator); 88 Trey Hillman (third base); 99 Keith Johnson (first base); 40 Eric Duncan (hitting); 30 Mel Stottlemyre Jr. (pitching); 82 James Rowson (bench/offensive coordinator); 21 Wellington Cepeda (bullpen); 10 Eddy Rodriguez (catching); 18 Robert Rodriguez (assistant hitting); 99 Koji Tanaka (bullpen catcher)

== Player stats ==
=== Batting ===
Note: G = Games played; AB = At bats; R = Runs; H = Hits; 2B = Doubles; 3B = Triples; HR = Home runs; RBI = Runs batted in; SB = Stolen bases; BB = Walks; AVG = Batting average; SLG = Slugging average

Player	G	AB	R	H	2B	3B	HR	RBI	SB	BB	AVG	SLG
Miguel Rojas	132	495	66	131	30	3	9	48	13	37	.265	.392
Jazz Chisholm Jr.	124	464	70	115	20	4	18	53	23	34	.248	.425
Jesús Aguilar	131	449	49	117	23	0	22	93	0	46	.261	.459
Adam Duvall	91	314	41	72	10	1	22	68	5	21	.229	.478
Jorge Alfaro	92	295	22	72	15	1	4	30	8	11	.244	.342
Lewis Brinson	89	274	24	62	14	0	9	33	1	13	.226	.376
Isan Díaz	89	238	25	46	9	0	4	17	1	34	.193	.282
Brian Anderson	67	233	24	58	9	0	7	28	5	26	.249	.378
Starling Marte	64	233	52	71	11	1	7	25	22	32	.305	.451
Jon Berti	85	233	35	49	10	1	4	19	8	32	.210	.313
Jesús Sánchez	64	227	27	57	8	2	14	36	0	20	.251	.489
Garrett Cooper	71	215	30	61	10	1	9	33	1	30	.284	.465
Magneuris Sierra	123	209	27	48	6	1	0	5	11	15	.230	.268
Corey Dickerson	63	205	27	54	12	3	2	14	2	16	.263	.380
Sandy León	83	202	15	37	5	0	4	14	0	12	.183	.267
Bryan De La Cruz	58	199	17	59	7	2	5	19	1	18	.296	.427
Joe Panik	53	122	8	21	3	0	1	7	2	9	.172	.221
Lewin Díaz	40	122	16	25	4	1	8	13	0	6	.205	.451
Alex Jackson	42	108	11	17	4	0	3	12	0	11	.157	.278
Eddy Alvarez	24	64	8	12	4	1	1	6	1	4	.188	.328
Chad Wallach	23	60	2	12	2	1	0	6	0	3	.200	.267
José Devers	21	41	7	10	3	0	0	5	0	3	.244	.317
Nick Fortes	14	31	6	9	0	0	4	7	1	3	.290	.677
Deven Marrero	10	16	4	3	0	0	1	1	1	3	.188	.375
Payton Henry	5	15	0	4	1	0	0	0	0	1	.267	.333
Brian Miller	5	11	1	3	0	0	0	0	0	0	.273	.273
Monte Harrison	9	10	0	2	1	0	0	0	0	0	.200	.300
Luis Marté	4	6	2	1	0	0	0	0	0	1	.167	.167
Pitcher totals	162	257	7	16	5	0	0	2	0	9	.062	.082
Team totals	162	5348	623	1244	226	23	158	594	106	450	.233	.372

=== Pitching ===
Note: W = Wins; L = Losses; ERA = Earned run average; G = Games pitched; GS = Games started; SV = Saves; IP = Innings pitched; H = Hits allowed; R = Runs allowed; ER = Earned runs allowed; BB = Walks allowed; SO = Strikeouts

Player	W	L	ERA	G	GS	SV	IP	H	R	ER	BB	SO
Sandy Alcántara	9	15	3.19	33	33	0	205.2	171	85	73	50	201
Trevor Rogers	7	8	2.64	25	25	0	133.0	107	46	39	46	157
Pablo López	5	5	3.07	20	20	0	102.2	89	37	35	26	115
Zach Thompson	3	7	3.24	26	14	0	75.0	63	35	27	28	66
Dylan Floro	6	6	2.81	68	0	15	64.0	53	25	20	25	62
Anthony Bass	3	9	3.82	70	1	0	61.1	55	33	26	24	58
Anthony Bender	3	2	2.79	60	1	3	61.1	45	22	19	20	71
Richard Bleier	3	2	2.95	68	0	0	58.0	51	20	19	6	44
Jesús Luzardo	4	5	6.44	12	12	0	57.1	60	41	41	32	58
Zach Pop	1	0	4.12	50	0	0	54.2	54	29	25	24	51
Elieser Hernández	1	3	4.18	11	11	0	51.2	54	26	24	14	53
Ross Detwiler	2	1	4.96	46	5	0	45.1	41	26	25	15	56
John Curtiss	3	1	2.48	35	2	0	40.0	34	13	11	9	40
Yimi García	3	7	3.47	39	0	15	36.1	31	18	14	13	35
Jordan Holloway	2	3	4.00	13	4	0	36.0	23	19	16	26	36
Steven Okert	3	1	2.75	34	0	0	36.0	22	12	11	15	40
Nick Neidert	1	2	4.54	8	7	0	35.2	31	18	18	23	21
Adam Cimber	1	2	2.88	33	0	0	34.1	30	14	11	11	21
Braxton Garrett	1	2	5.03	8	7	0	34.0	42	20	19	20	32
Cody Poteet	2	3	4.99	7	7	0	30.2	25	17	17	16	32
Paul Campbell	2	3	6.41	16	1	0	26.2	32	24	19	10	26
Edward Cabrera	0	3	5.81	7	7	0	26.1	24	20	17	19	28
Sean Guenther	0	1	9.30	14	0	0	20.1	31	22	21	10	15
Daniel Castano	0	2	4.87	5	4	0	20.1	22	12	11	8	13
David Hess	2	2	8.00	14	1	0	18.0	24	18	16	10	16
Luis Madero	0	0	9.00	6	0	0	12.0	13	12	12	8	4
Shawn Morimando	0	0	9.58	4	0	0	10.1	18	11	11	5	9
Taylor Williams	0	0	7.11	6	0	0	6.1	9	6	5	5	3
Sandy León	0	0	7.50	6	0	0	6.0	7	5	5	1	2
Austin Pruitt	0	0	1.93	4	0	0	4.2	4	1	1	0	4
Bryan Mitchell	0	0	4.50	2	0	0	4.0	5	2	2	2	4
Andrew Bellatti	0	0	13.50	3	0	0	3.1	6	5	5	2	4
Preston Guilmet	0	0	4.50	2	0	0	2.0	2	1	1	0	1
Jorge Guzmán	0	0	32.40	2	0	0	1.2	4	6	6	6	3
Team totals	67	95	3.96	162	162	33	1415.0	1282	701	622	529	1381

== Farm system ==
Level	Team	League	Manager
Triple-A	Jacksonville Jumbo Shrimp	Triple-A East	Al Pedrique
Double-A	Pensacola Blue Wahoos	Double-A South	Kevin Randel
High-A	Beloit Snappers	High-A Central	Mike Jacobs
Low-A	Jupiter Hammerheads	Low-A Southeast	Jorge Hernandez
Rookie	FCL Marlins	Florida Complex League	Luis Dorante
Rookie	DSL Marlins	Dominican Summer League	Rigoberto Silverio
