= 2022 Miami Marlins season =

2022 Miami Marlins
- League: National League
- Division: East
- Ballpark: LoanDepot Park
- City: Miami, Florida
- Record: 69–93 (.426)
- Divisional place: 4th
- Owners: Bruce Sherman
- General managers: Kim Ng
- Managers: Don Mattingly
- Television: Bally Sports Florida; Bally Sports Sun (English: Paul Severino, Rod Allen, Jeff Nelson, J. P. Arencibia, Gaby Sánchez, Tommy Hutton) (Spanish: Raul Striker Jr., Cookie Rojas)
- Radio: WINZ; Miami Marlins Radio Network (English) (Glenn Geffner), Kyle Sielaff; WAQI (Spanish) (Luis Quintana)

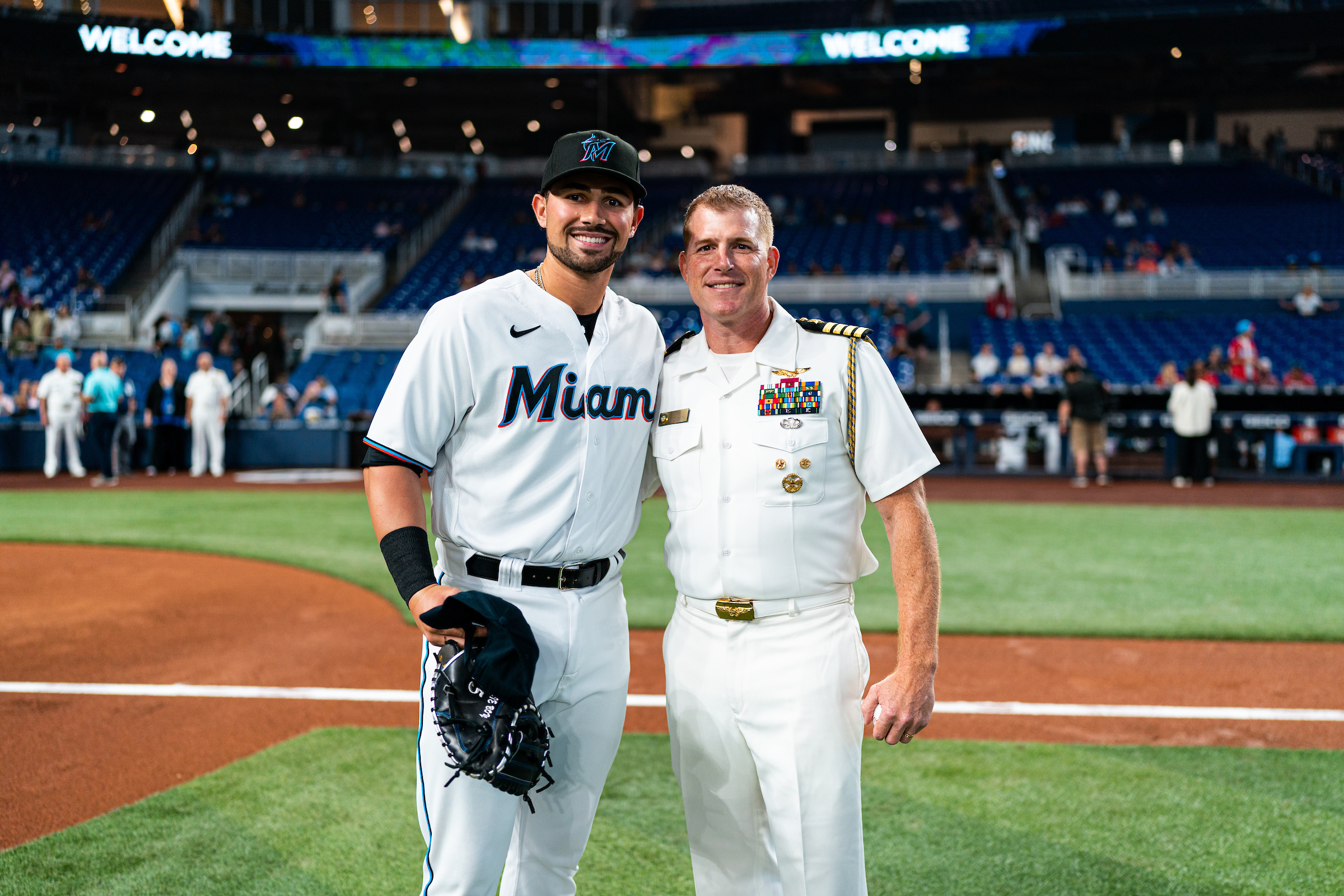
U.S. Navy Capt. Greg Smith (right), chief of staff, Navy Region Southeast, and Miami Marlins catcher Payton Henry, take a photo at a Miami Marlins Major League Baseball game during Fleet Week Port Everglades festivities on May 2, 2022.

The 2022 Miami Marlins season was the 30th season for the Major League Baseball (MLB) franchise in the National League and the 11th as the Miami Marlins. The Marlins played their home games at LoanDepot Park as members of the National League East.

On December 2, 2021, Commissioner of Baseball Rob Manfred announced a lockout of players, following expiration of the collective bargaining agreement (CBA) between the league and the Major League Baseball Players Association (MLBPA). On March 10, 2022, MLB and the MLBPA agreed to a new collective bargaining agreement, thus ending the lockout. Opening Day was played on April 7. Although MLB previously announced that several series would be cancelled due to the lockout, the agreement provides for a 162-game season, with originally canceled games to be made up via doubleheaders.

On February 28, 2022, Derek Jeter resigned as team CEO and ceded his ownership stake.

In June, 2022, tension in the clubhouse was so severe that manager Don Mattingly called a meeting to try to resolve the issues.

On September 25, 2022, the Marlins and manager Don Mattingly mutually agreed to part ways following the conclusion of the 2022 season.

== Offseason ==
=== Lockout ===
The expiration of the league's collective bargaining agreement (CBA) with the Major League Baseball Players Association occurred on December 1, 2021 with no new agreement in place. As a result, the team owners voted unanimously to lockout the players stopping all free agency and trades.

The parties came to an agreement on a new CBA on March 10, 2022.

=== Rule changes ===
Pursuant to the new CBA, several new rules were instituted for the 2022 season. The National League will adopt the designated hitter full-time, a draft lottery will be implemented, the postseason will expand from ten teams to twelve, and advertising patches will appear on player uniforms and helmets for the first time.

== Roster ==
2022 Miami Marlins
Roster
Pitchers: 22 Sandy Alcántara; 43 Shawn Armstrong; 52 Anthony Bass; 55 Anthony Bender; 35 Richard Bleier; 81 Huascar Brazobán; 43 Jeff Brigham; 27 Edward Cabrera; 20 Daniel Castano; 94 Jake Fishman; 36 Dylan Floro; 60 Braxton Garrett; 38 Louis Head; 57 Elieser Hernández; 93 Bryan Hoeing; 25 Jordan Holloway; 70 A. J. Ladwig; 49 Pablo López; 44 Jesus Luzardo; 23 Max Meyer; 51 Tommy Nance; 90 Andrew Nardi; 29 Nick Neidert; 48 Steven Okert; 56 Zach Pop; 72 Cody Poteet; 28 Trevor Rogers; 66 Tanner Scott; 31 Cole Sulser; 47 Jimmy Yacabonis; 80 Aneurys Zabala	Catchers: 54 Nick Fortes; 59 Payton Henry; 58 Jacob Stallings; Infielders: 99 Jesús Aguilar; 15 Brian Anderson; 37 Willians Astudillo; 5 Jon Berti; 2 Jazz Chisholm Jr.; 26 Garrett Cooper; 34 Lewin Díaz; 62 Joe Dunand; 9 Erik González; 65 Jordan Groshans; 83 Charles Leblanc; 11 Miguel Rojas; 18 Joey Wendle; 46 Luke Williams	Outfielders: 67 JJ Bleday; 86 Peyton Burdick; 14 Bryan De La Cruz; 64 Jerar Encarnación; 24 Avisaíl García; 6 Billy Hamilton; 7 Jesús Sánchez; 12 Jorge Soler	Manager: 8 Don Mattingly; Coaches: 21 Wellington Cepeda (bullpen); 40 Eric Duncan (quality assurance); 85 Rob Flippo (bullpen coordinator); 17 Edwar Gonzalez (assistant hitting); -- Michael Hernandez (bullpen catcher); 88 Keith Johnson (first base); 13 Al Pedrique (third base/infield); 10 Eddy Rodriguez (catching); 82 James Rowson (bench/offensive coordinator); 30 Mel Stottlemyre Jr. (pitching); 33 Marcus Thames (hitting)

== Regular season ==
=== National League East ===
NL East
Team	W	L	Pct.	GB	Home	Road
Atlanta Braves	101	61	.623	—	55‍–‍26	46‍–‍35
New York Mets	101	61	.623	—	54‍–‍27	47‍–‍34
Philadelphia Phillies	87	75	.537	14	47‍–‍34	40‍–‍41
Miami Marlins	69	93	.426	32	34‍–‍47	35‍–‍46
Washington Nationals	55	107	.340	46	26‍–‍55	29‍–‍52

=== National League Wild Card ===
Division leaders
Team	W	L	Pct.
Los Angeles Dodgers	111	51	.685
Atlanta Braves	101	61	.623
St. Louis Cardinals	93	69	.574

Wild Card teams (Top 3 teams qualify for postseason)
Team	W	L	Pct.	GB
New York Mets	101	61	.623	+14
San Diego Padres	89	73	.549	+2
Philadelphia Phillies	87	75	.537	—
Milwaukee Brewers	86	76	.531	1
San Francisco Giants	81	81	.500	6
Arizona Diamondbacks	74	88	.457	13
Chicago Cubs	74	88	.457	13
Miami Marlins	69	93	.426	18
Colorado Rockies	68	94	.420	19
Pittsburgh Pirates	62	100	.383	25
Cincinnati Reds	62	100	.383	25
Washington Nationals	55	107	.340	32

=== Record vs. opponents ===
2022 National League record Source: MLB Standings Grid – 2022
Team	AZ	ATL	CHC	CIN	COL	LAD	MIA	MIL	NYM	PHI	PIT	SD	SF	STL	WSH	AL
Arizona	—	2–4	4–3	3–4	9–10	5–14	5–1	4–3	2–4	3–3	4–3	5–14	10–9	2–5	4–3	12–8
Atlanta	4–2	—	3–3	4–3	6–1	2–4	13–6	3–3	10–9	11–8	7–0	3–4	4–3	4–3	14–5	13–7
Chicago	3–4	3–3	—	11–8	3–4	0–7	4–2	10–9	4–3	6–0	10–9	2–5	2–5	6–13	4–2	6–14
Cincinnati	4–3	3–4	8–11	—	2–4	0–7	4–3	6–13	1–5	1–6	7–12	0–6	4–2	7–12	3–4	12–8
Colorado	10–9	1–6	4–3	4–2	—	8–11	2–4	3–4	2–5	2–5	3–3	10–9	5–14	2–4	3–4	9–11
Los Angeles	14–5	4–2	7–0	7–0	11–8	—	6–1	4–3	3–4	3–4	1–5	14–5	15–4	4–2	3–3	15–5
Miami	1–5	6–13	2–4	3–4	4–2	1–6	—	4–3	6–13	7–12	4–3	3–4	3–4	2–4	15–4	8–12
Milwaukee	3–4	3–3	9–10	13–6	4–3	3–4	3–4	—	2–4	2–4	11–8	3–4	3–4	9–10	3–3	15–5
New York	4–2	9–10	3–4	5–1	5–2	4–3	13–6	4–2	—	14–5	6–1	2–4	4–3	5–2	14–5	9–11
Philadelphia	3–3	8–11	0–6	6–1	5–2	4–3	12–7	4–2	5–14	—	6–1	4–3	1–5	4–3	16–3	9–11
Pittsburgh	3–4	0–7	9–10	12–7	3–3	5–1	3–4	8–11	1–6	1–6	—	2–4	1–5	6–13	4–3	4–16
San Diego	14–5	4–3	5–2	6–0	9–10	5–14	4–3	4–3	4–2	3–4	4–2	—	13–6	2–4	4–3	8–12
San Francisco	9–10	3–4	5–2	2–4	14–5	4–15	4–3	4–3	3–4	5–1	5–1	6–13	—	3–4	4–2	10–10
St. Louis	5–2	3–4	13–6	12–7	4–2	2–4	4–2	10–9	2–5	3–4	13–6	4–2	4–3	—	4–3	10–10
Washington	3–4	5–14	2–4	4–3	4–3	3–3	4–15	3–3	5–14	3–16	3–4	3–4	2–4	3–4	—	8–12

Updated with the results of all games through October 5, 2022.

=== Game log ===
2022 game log: 69–93 (Home: 34–47; Away: 35–46)
April: 12–8 (Home: 6–3; Away: 6–5)

#	Date	Opponent	Score	Win	Loss	Save	Stadium	Attendance	Record	Box/Streak
1	April 8	@ Giants	5–6 (10)	Álvarez (1–0)	**Bass** (0–1)	—	Oracle Park	40,853	0–1	L1
2	April 9	@ Giants	2–1	**Okert** (1–0)	McGee (0–1)	**Bender** (1)	Oracle Park	38,885	1–1	W1
3	April 10	@ Giants	2–3	García (1–0)	**Rogers** (0–1)	Leone (1)	Oracle Park	37,332	1–2	L1
4	April 11	@ Angels	2–6	Lorenzen (1–0)	**Hernández** (0–1)	—	Angel Stadium	20,480	1–3	L2
5	April 12	@ Angels	3–4	Iglesias (1–0)	**Bender** (0–1)	—	Angel Stadium	16,132	1–4	L3
6	April 14	Phillies	4–3	**Alcántara** (1–0)	Gibson (1–1)	**Bender** (2)	**LoanDepot Park**	31,184	2–4	W1
7	April 15	Phillies	7–1	**López** (1–0)	Eflin (0–1)	—	**LoanDepot Park**	11,990	3–4	W2
8	April 16	Phillies	3–10	Suárez (1–0)	**Rogers** (0–2)	—	**LoanDepot Park**	13,412	3–5	L1
9	April 17	Phillies	11–3	**Hernández** (1–1)	Wheeler (0–2)	—	**LoanDepot Park**	11,476	4–5	W1
10	April 19	Cardinals	1–5	Wainwright (2–1)	**Luzardo** (0–1)	—	**LoanDepot Park**	8,475	4–6	L1
11	April 20	Cardinals	0–2	Cabrera (1–0)	**Bender** (0–2)	Gallegos (3)	**LoanDepot Park**	8,655	4–7	L2
12	April 21	Cardinals	5–0	**López** (2–0)	Hicks (1–1)	—	**LoanDepot Park**	9,670	5–7	W1
13	April 22	@ Braves	0–3	Wright (2–0)	**Rogers** (0–3)	Jansen (4)	Truist Park	40,402	5–8	L1
14	April 23	@ Braves	9–7	**Okert** (2–0)	Strider (0–1)	**Scott** (1)	Truist Park	41,931	6–8	W1
15	April 24	@ Braves	5–4	**Luzardo** (1–1)	Elder (1–2)	**Head** (1)	Truist Park	38,440	7–8	W2
16	April 26	@ Nationals	5–2	**Alcántara** (2–0)	Gray (2–2)	**Bender** (3)	Nationals Park	12,613	8–8	W3
17	April 27	@ Nationals	2–1	**López** (3–0)	Fedde (1–2)	**Bender** (4)	Nationals Park	13,356	9–8	W4
18	April 28	@ Nationals	3–2	**Rogers** (1–3)	Corbin (0–4)	**Sulser** (1)	Nationals Park	12,454	10–8	W5
19	April 29	Mariners	8–6	**Hernández** (2–1)	Brash (1–2)	**Bender** (5)	**LoanDepot Park**	9,963	11–8	W6
20	April 30	Mariners	3–1	**Luzardo** (2–1)	Ray (2–2)	**Bender** (6)	**LoanDepot Park**	29,010	12–8	W7

May: 7–19 (Home: 4–9; Away: 3–10)

#	Date	Opponent	Score	Win	Loss	Save	Stadium	Attendance	Record	Box/Streak
21	May 1	Mariners	3–7	Gilbert (4–0)	**Alcántara** (2–1)	—	**LoanDepot Park**	16,741	12–9	L1
22	May 2	Diamondbacks	4–5	Gallen (1–0)	**López** (3–1)	Kennedy (2)	**LoanDepot Park**	6,224	12–10	L2
23	May 3	Diamondbacks	4–5	Castellanos (2–1)	**Rogers** (1–4)	Mantiply (2)	**LoanDepot Park**	6,263	12–11	L3
24	May 4	Diamondbacks	7–8	Middleton (1–1)	**Bender** (0–3)	Kennedy (3)	**LoanDepot Park**	7,356	12–12	L4
25	May 5	@ Padres	1–2	Martinez (2–2)	**Luzardo** (2–2)	Rogers (11)	Petco Park	31,034	12–13	L5
26	May 6	@ Padres	2–3	Darvish (3–1)	**Alcántara** (2–2)	Wilson (1)	Petco Park	37,585	12–14	L6
27	May 7	@ Padres	8–0	**López** (4–1)	Manaea (2–3)	—	Petco Park	34,709	13–14	W1
28	May 8	@ Padres	2–3	Suárez (2–1)	**Sulser** (0–1)	—	Petco Park	37,937	13–15	L1
29	May 9	@ Diamondbacks	3–4	Nelson (1–0)	**Hernández** (2–2)	Melancon (6)	Chase Field	11,571	13–16	L2
30	May 10	@ Diamondbacks	3–9	Bumgarner (2–1)	**Luzardo** (2–3)	—	Chase Field	8,855	13–17	L3
31	May 11	@ Diamondbacks	11–3	**Bass** (1–1)	Melancon (0–4)	—	Chase Field	9,058	14–17	W1
32	May 13	Brewers	1–2	Williams (2–0)	**Scott** (0–1)	Hader (13)	**LoanDepot Park**	9,110	14–18	L1
33	May 14	Brewers	9–3	**Rogers** (2–4)	Lauer (3–1)	—	**LoanDepot Park**	12,941	15–18	W1
34	May 15	Brewers	3–7	Woodruff (4–2)	**Hernández** (2–3)	Ashby (1)	**LoanDepot Park**	11,729	15–19	L1
35	May 16	Nationals	8–2	**Alcántara** (3–2)	Sanchez (2–3)	—	**LoanDepot Park**	6,601	16–19	W1
36	May 17	Nationals	5–1	**Bender** (1–3)	Adon (1–7)	—	**LoanDepot Park**	8,097	17–19	W2
37	May 18	Nationals	4–5 (10)	Rainey (1–1)	**Castano** (0–1)	Arano (1)	**LoanDepot Park**	7,566	17–20	L1
38	May 20	Braves	3–5	Morton (3–3)	**Rogers** (2–5)	Smith (2)	**LoanDepot Park**	9,776	17–21	L2
39	May 21	Braves	3–4	Wright (4–2)	**Hernández** (2–4)	Jansen (10)	**LoanDepot Park**	13,264	17–22	L3
40	May 22	Braves	4–3	**Alcántara** (4–2)	Anderson (3–3)	—	**LoanDepot Park**	17,908	18–22	W1
41	May 24	@ Rays	0–4	McClanahan (4–2)	**López** (4–2)	—	Tropicana Field	9,006	18–23	L1
42	May 25	@ Rays	4–5	Rasmussen (5–1)	**Poteet** (0–1)	Poche (1)	Tropicana Field	7,520	18–24	L2
43	May 27	@ Braves	4–6	Stephens (1–1)	**Bass** (1–2)	Jansen (11)	Truist Park	40,064	18–25	L3
44	May 28	@ Braves	4–1	**Alcántara** (5–2)	Davidson (1–2)	**Sulser** (2)	Truist Park	40,682	19–25	W1
45	May 29	@ Braves	3–6	Fried (5–2)	**Hernández** (2–5)	Jansen (12)	Truist Park	39,669	19–26	L1
46	May 30	@ Rockies	1–7	Feltner (1–1)	**Sulser** (0–2)	—	Coors Field	40,275	19–27	L2
—	May 31	@ Rockies	Postponed (rain); Makeup June 1							

June: 15–13 (Home: 9–4; Away: 6–9)

#	Date	Opponent	Score	Win	Loss	Save	Stadium	Attendance	Record	Box/Streak
47	June 1 (1)	@ Rockies	14–1	**Cabrera** (1–0)	Senzatela (2–3)	—	Coors Field	see 2nd game	20–27	W1
48	June 1 (2)	@ Rockies	12–13 (10)	Bard (3–2)	**Sulser** (0–3)	—	Coors Field	22,719	20–28	L1
49	June 2	Giants	3–0	**Alcántara** (6–2)	Wood (3–5)	**Scott** (2)	**LoanDepot Park**	8,202	21–28	W1
50	June 3	Giants	6–15	Littell (1–1)	**Bleier** (0–1)	—	**LoanDepot Park**	6,512	21–29	L1
51	June 4	Giants	5–4	**Scott** (1–1)	Rogers (0–2)	—	**LoanDepot Park**	7,515	22–29	W1
52	June 5	Giants	1–5	Junis (3–1)	**Garrett** (0–1)	—	**LoanDepot Park**	9,641	22–30	L1
53	June 7	Nationals	12–2	**Cabrera** (2–0)	Adon (1–10)	—	**LoanDepot Park**	7,112	23–30	W1
54	June 8	Nationals	2–1 (10)	**Scott** (2–1)	Rainey (1–2)	—	**LoanDepot Park**	7,193	24–30	W2
55	June 9	Nationals	7–4	**Rogers** (3–5)	Strasburg (0–1)	**Scott** (3)	**LoanDepot Park**	9,108	25–30	W3
56	June 10	@ Astros	7–4	**Sulser** (1–3)	García (3–5)	**Scott** (4)	Minute Maid Park	34,163	26–30	W4
57	June 11	@ Astros	5–1	**Garrett** (1–1)	Valdez (6–3)	—	Minute Maid Park	31,379	27–30	W5
58	June 12	@ Astros	4–9	Verlander (8–2)	**Cabrera** (2–1)	—	Minute Maid Park	29,341	27–31	L1
59	June 13	@ Phillies	2–3	Domínguez (4–1)	**Bass** (1–3)	—	Citizens Bank Park	22,701	27–32	L2
60	June 14	@ Phillies	11–9	**Okert** (3–0)	Knebel (2–5)	**Scott** (5)	Citizens Bank Park	28,073	28–32	W1
61	June 15	@ Phillies	1–3	Brogdon (2–0)	**Scott** (2–2)	—	Citizens Bank Park	24,726	28–33	L1
62	June 17	@ Mets	4–10	Carrasco (8–2)	**López** (4–3)	—	Citi Field	36,111	28–34	L2
63	June 18	@ Mets	2–3	Walker (5–2)	**Garrett** (1–2)	Díaz (14)	Citi Field	40,021	28–35	L3
64	June 19	@ Mets	6–2	**Alcántara** (7–2)	Bassitt (5–5)	—	Citi Field	41,255	29–35	W1
65	June 20	@ Mets	0–6	Peterson (4–1)	**Rogers** (3–6)	—	Citi Field	34,937	29–36	L1
66	June 21	Rockies	9–8	**Okert** (4–0)	Colomé (2–1)	**Scott** (6)	**LoanDepot Park**	9,012	30–36	W1
67	June 22	Rockies	7–4	**López** (5–3)	Kuhl (4–5)	—	**LoanDepot Park**	8,983	31–36	W2
68	June 23	Rockies	3–2	**Okert** (5–0)	Colomé (2–2)	**Scott** (7)	**LoanDepot Park**	11,854	32–36	W3
69	June 24	Mets	3–5	Walker (6–2)	**Alcántara** (7–3)	Díaz (15)	**LoanDepot Park**	11,444	32–37	L1
70	June 25	Mets	3–5	Bassitt (6–5)	**Yacabonis** (0–1)	Díaz (16)	**LoanDepot Park**	18,722	32–38	L2
71	June 26	Mets	3–2	**Scott** (3–2)	Ottavino (2–2)	—	**LoanDepot Park**	19,343	33–38	W1
72	June 27	@ Cardinals	0–9	Wainwright (6–5)	**López** (5–4)	—	Busch Stadium	34,701	33–39	L1
73	June 28	@ Cardinals	3–5	Hudson (6–4)	**Garrett** (1–3)	Helsley (6)	Busch Stadium	32,065	33–40	L2
74	June 29	@ Cardinals	4–3	**Alcántara** (8–3)	Helsley (3–1)	—	Busch Stadium	35,674	34–40	W1

July: 13–15 (Home: 3–10; Away: 10–5)

#	Date	Opponent	Score	Win	Loss	Save	Stadium	Attendance	Record	Box/Streak
75	July 1	@ Nationals	6–3	**Rogers** (4–6)	Gray (6–5)	**Scott** (8)	Nationals Park	23,794	35–40	W2
76	July 2	@ Nationals	5–3	**Castano** (1–1)	Tetreault (2–2)	**Scott** (9)	Nationals Park	19,674	36–40	W3
77	July 3	@ Nationals	7–4 (10)	**Scott** (4–2)	Edwards Jr. (2–3)	**Floro** (1)	Nationals Park	25,385	37–40	W4
78	July 4	@ Nationals	3–2 (10)	**Yacabonis** (1–1)	Rainey (1–3)	**Floro** (2)	Nationals Park	25,129	38–40	W5
79	July 5	Angels	2–1	**Alcántara** (9–3)	Syndergaard (5–7)	**Scott** (10)	**LoanDepot Park**	13,338	39–40	W6
80	July 6	Angels	2–5	Ohtani (8–4)	**Rogers** (4–7)	—	**LoanDepot Park**	18,741	39–41	L1
81	July 7	@ Mets	0–10	Williams (2–5)	**Castano** (1–2)	—	Citi Field	30,555	39–42	L2
82	July 8	@ Mets	5–2	**López** (6–4)	Bassitt (6–6)	**Scott** (11)	Citi Field	25,208	40–42	W1
83	July 9	@ Mets	4–5 (10)	Holderman (4–0)	**Scott** (4–3)	—	Citi Field	43,336	40–43	L1
84	July 10	@ Mets	2–0 (10)	**Bleier** (1–1)	Hunter (0–1)	**Scott** (12)	Citi Field	34,774	41–43	W1
85	July 11	Pirates	1–5	Keller (3–6)	**Rogers** (4–8)	De Los Santos (3)	**LoanDepot Park**	8,560	41–44	L1
86	July 12	Pirates	2–3	Peters (5–2)	**Castano** (1–3)	Bednar (16)	**LoanDepot Park**	8,022	41–45	L2
87	July 13	Pirates	5–4 (10)	**Pop** (1–0)	Bednar (3–3)	—	**LoanDepot Park**	9,524	42–45	W1
88	July 14	Pirates	3–2 (11)	**Bleier** (2–1)	Crowe (3–6)	—	**LoanDepot Park**	13,612	43–45	W2
89	July 15	Phillies	1–2	Gibson (5–3)	**Alcántara** (9–4)	Domínguez (4)	**LoanDepot Park**	10,193	43–46	L1
90	July 16	Phillies	0–10	Suárez (7–5)	**Meyer** (0–1)	—	**LoanDepot Park**	13,497	43–47	L2
91	July 17	Phillies	0–4	Nola (6–7)	**Rogers** (4–9)	Alvarado (1)	**LoanDepot Park**	12,450	43–48	L3
92	July 21	Rangers	0–8	Gray (7–4)	**López** (6–5)	—	**LoanDepot Park**	9,524	43–49	L4
93	July 22	@ Pirates	8–1	**Garrett** (2–3)	Thompson (3–7)	—	PNC Park	22,316	44–49	W1
94	July 23	@ Pirates	0–1	Quintana (3–5)	**Scott** (4–4)	Bednar (17)	PNC Park	22,560	44–50	L1
95	July 24	@ Pirates	6–5 (10)	**Bass** (2–3)	Bednar (3–4)	**Brigham** (1)	PNC Park	15,188	45–50	W1
96	July 25	@ Reds	2–11	Lodolo (3–3)	**Rogers** (4–10)	—	Great American Ball Park	12,948	45–51	L1
97	July 26	@ Reds	2–1	**López** (7–5)	Greene (3–12)	**Scott** (13)	Great American Ball Park	14,937	46–51	W1
98	July 27	@ Reds	3–5	Castillo (4–4)	**Garrett** (2–4)	Strickland (6)	Great American Ball Park	11,387	46–52	L1
99	July 28	@ Reds	7–6	**Pop** (2–0)	Strickland (2–3)	**Scott** (14)	Great American Ball Park	14,506	47–52	W1
100	July 29	Mets	4–6	Ottavino (5–2)	**Okert** (5–1)	Díaz (23)	**LoanDepot Park**	15,131	47–53	L1
101	July 30	Mets	0–4	Carrasco (11–4)	**Neidert** (0–1)	—	**LoanDepot Park**	16,655	47–54	L2
102	July 31	Mets	3–9	Walker (9–2)	**López** (7–6)	—	**LoanDepot Park**	17,449	47–55	L3

August: 8–20 (Home: 4–12; Away: 4–8)

#	Date	Opponent	Score	Win	Loss	Save	Stadium	Attendance	Record	Box/Streak
103	August 1	Reds	1–3	Greene (4–12)	**Luzardo** (2–4)	Strickland (7)	**LoanDepot Park**	7,701	47–56	L4
104	August 2	Reds	1–2	Ashcraft (5–2)	**Garrett** (2–5)	Díaz (4)	**LoanDepot Park**	8,188	47–57	L5
105	August 3	Reds	3–0	**Alcántara** (10–4)	Minor (1–8)	—	**LoanDepot Park**	8,656	48–57	W1
106	August 5	@ Cubs	1–2	Wick (3–5)	**Floro** (0–1)	—	Wrigley Field	35,689	48–58	L1
107	August 6	@ Cubs	0–4	Smyly (4–6)	**López** (7–7)	—	Wrigley Field	36,787	48–59	L2
108	August 7	@ Cubs	3–0	**Luzardo** (3–4)	Sampson (0–3)	**Scott** (15)	Wrigley Field	30,177	49–59	W1
109	August 9	@ Phillies	1–4	Wheeler (11–5)	**Garrett** (2–6)	Domínguez (7)	Citizens Bank Park	22,087	49–60	L1
110	August 10	@ Phillies	3–4	Bellatti (3–3)	**Alcántara** (10–5)	Domínguez (8)	Citizens Bank Park	23,021	49–61	L2
111	August 11	@ Phillies	3–0	**Cabrera** (3–1)	Gibson (7–5)	**Scott** (16)	Citizens Bank Park	25,444	50–61	W1
112	August 12	Braves	3–4	Matzek (2–2)	**Hernández** (2–6)	Jansen (25)	**LoanDepot Park**	10,459	50–62	L1
113	August 13 (1)	Braves	2–5	Muller (1–1)	**Luzardo** (3–5)	Jansen (26)	**LoanDepot Park**	7,308	50–63	L2
114	August 13 (2)	Braves	2–6	Anderson (10–6)	**Nance** (0–1)	Iglesias (17)	**LoanDepot Park**	11,910	50–64	L3
115	August 14	Braves	1–3	Matzek (3–2)	**Scott** (4–5)	Jansen (27)	**LoanDepot Park**	10,902	50–65	L4
116	August 15	Padres	3–0	**Alcántara** (11–5)	Musgrove (8–6)	**Scott** (17)	**LoanDepot Park**	9,123	51–65	W1
117	August 16	Padres	4–3	**Hernández** (3–6)	García (4–6)	**Floro** (3)	**LoanDepot Park**	9,065	52–65	W2
118	August 17	Padres	3–10	Morejón (2–0)	**López** (7–8)	—	**LoanDepot Park**	7,273	52–66	L1
119	August 19	@ Dodgers	1–2	Martin (4–0)	**Floro** (0–2)	Phillips (2)	Dodger Stadium	50,431	52–67	L2
120	August 20	@ Dodgers	0–7	May (1–0)	**Hoeing** (0–1)	—	Dodger Stadium	51,813	52–68	L3
121	August 21	@ Dodgers	3–10	Pepiot (2–0)	**Alcántara** (11–6)	—	Dodger Stadium	42,125	52–69	L4
122	August 22	@ Athletics	3–0	**Cabrera** (4–1)	Oller (2–6)	**Scott** (18)	Oakland Coliseum	2,630	53–69	W1
123	August 23	@ Athletics	5–3	**López** (8–8)	Logue (3–8)	**Scott** (19)	Oakland Coliseum	4,028	54–69	W2
124	August 24	@ Athletics	2–3 (10)	Puk (3–1)	**Bleier** (2–2)	—	Oakland Coliseum	3,901	54–70	L1
125	August 26	Dodgers	6–10 (10)	Price (2–0)	**Nardi** (0–1)	—	**LoanDepot Park**	9,365	54–71	L2
126	August 27	Dodgers	2–1	**Alcántara** (12–6)	May (1–1)	—	**LoanDepot Park**	23,543	55–71	W1
127	August 28	Dodgers	1–8	Urías (14–7)	**Cabrera** (4–2)	—	**LoanDepot Park**	13,617	55–72	L1
128	August 29	Dodgers	2–3 (10)	Kimbrel (4–5)	**Brazobán** (0–1)	Martin (1)	**LoanDepot Park**	10,288	55–73	L2
129	August 30	Rays	2–7	Chargois (2–0)	**Luzardo** (3–6)	—	**LoanDepot Park**	7,386	55–74	L3
130	August 31	Rays	1–2 (10)	Adam (2–2)	**Nance** (0–2)	Beeks (2)	**LoanDepot Park**	7,420	55–75	L4

September: 10–17 (Home: 6–8; Away: 4–9)

#	Date	Opponent	Score	Win	Loss	Save	Stadium	Attendance	Record	Box/Streak
131	September 2	@ Braves	1–8	Morton (7–5)	**Alcántara** (12–7)	—	Truist Park	42,161	55–76	L5
132	September 3	@ Braves	1–2	Matzek (4–2)	**Okert** (5–2)	—	Truist Park	42,405	55–77	L6
133	September 4	@ Braves	1–7	Fried (13–5)	**López** (8–9)	—	Truist Park	42,360	55–78	L7
134	September 6	@ Phillies	2–3	Robertson (4–2)	**Nance** (0–3)	—	Citizens Bank Park	17,145	55–79	L8
135	September 7	@ Phillies	3–4	Falter (4–3)	**Rogers** (4–11)	Brogdon (2)	Citizens Bank Park	17,755	55–80	L9
136	September 8	@ Phillies	6–5	**Floro** (1–2)	Robertson (4–3)	—	Citizens Bank Park	19,073	56–80	W1
137	September 9	Mets	6–3	**Cabrera** (5–2)	Peterson (7–4)	**Floro** (4)	**LoanDepot Park**	12,692	57–80	W2
138	September 10	Mets	3–11	Carrasco (14–6)	**López** (8–10)	—	**LoanDepot Park**	17,441	57–81	L1
139	September 11	Mets	3–9	Walker (11–4)	**Luzardo** (3–7)	—	**LoanDepot Park**	13,234	57–82	L2
140	September 12 (1)	Rangers	2–3	Hernández (2–2)	**Okert** (5–3)	Leclerc (5)	**LoanDepot Park**	5,095	57–83	L3
141	September 12 (2)	Rangers	10–6	**Hoeing** (1–1)	Alexy (1–1)	—	**LoanDepot Park**	5,242	58–83	W1
142	September 13	Phillies	1–2	Falter (5–3)	**Alcántara** (12–8)	Robertson (20)	**LoanDepot Park**	5,801	58–84	L1
143	September 14	Phillies	1–6	Gibson (10–6)	**Cabrera** (5–3)	—	**LoanDepot Park**	5,632	58–85	L2
144	September 15	Phillies	5–3	**López** (9–10)	Syndergaard (9–10)	**Floro** (5)	**LoanDepot Park**	7,877	59–85	W1
145	September 16	@ Nationals	4–5	Edwards Jr. (6–3)	**Sulser** (1–4)	Finnegan (9)	Nationals Park	24,931	59–86	L1
146	September 17	@ Nationals	3–5	Harvey (2–1)	**Brigham** (0–1)	Finnegan (10)	Nationals Park	34,179	59–87	L2
147	September 18	@ Nationals	3–1	**Alcántara** (13–8)	Sánchez (2–6)	—	Nationals Park	31,638	60–87	W1
148	September 19	Cubs	10–3	**Cabrera** (6–3)	Miley (1–1)	—	**LoanDepot Park**	8,315	61–87	W2
149	September 20	Cubs	1–2	Alzolay (1–1)	**Okert** (5–4)	Hughes (6)	**LoanDepot Park**	7,972	61–88	L1
150	September 21	Cubs	3–4	Thompson (10–5)	**Okert** (5–5)	—	**LoanDepot Park**	8,753	61–89	L2
151	September 23	Nationals	5–2	**Garrett** (3–6)	Gray (7–10)	**Floro** (6)	**LoanDepot Park**	12,240	62–89	W1
152	September 24	Nationals	4–1	**Alcántara** (14–8)	Fedde (6–11)	**Floro** (7)	**LoanDepot Park**	16,099	63–89	W2
153	September 25	Nationals	1–6	Sánchez (3–6)	**Cabrera** (6–4)	—	**LoanDepot Park**	13,042	63–90	L1
154	September 27	@ Mets	6–4	**López** (10–10)	Carrasco (15–7)	**Floro** (8)	Citi Field	29,067	64–90	W1
155	September 28	@ Mets	4–5 (10)	Smith (3–3)	**Floro** (1–3)	—	Citi Field	28,228	64–91	L1
156	September 29	@ Brewers	4–2	**Nance** (1–3)	Peralta (4–4)	**Floro** (9)	American Family Field	23,122	65–91	W1
157	September 30	@ Brewers	0–1	Burnes (12–8)	**Alcántara** (14–9)	Williams (15)	American Family Field	31,945	65–92	L1

October: 4–1 (Home: 2–1; Away: 2–0)

#	Date	Opponent	Score	Win	Loss	Save	Stadium	Attendance	Record	Box/Streak
158	October 1	@ Brewers	4–3	**Nance** (2–3)	Williams (6–4)	**Bleier** (1)	American Family Field	30,686	66–92	W1
159	October 2	@ Brewers	4–3 (12)	**Brazobán** (1–1)	Gott (3–3)	**Scott** (20)	American Family Field	31,053	67–92	W2
160	October 3	Braves	4–0	**Luzardo** (4–7)	Elder (2–4)	—	**LoanDepot Park**	10,767	68–92	W3
161	October 4	Braves	1–2	**Odorizzi** (6–6)	Garrett (3–7)	**Jansen** (41)	**LoanDepot Park**	14,138	68–93	L1
162	October 5	Braves	12–9	**Nardi** (1–1)	Chavez (4–3)	**Floro** (10)	**LoanDepot Park**	12,195	69–93	W1

Legend: = Win = Loss = Postponement
Bold = Marlins team member

== Statistics ==
=== Batting ===
(through October 5, 2022)
Players in bold are on the active roster.
Note: G = Games played; AB = At bats; R = Runs; H = Hits; 2B = Doubles; 3B = Triples; HR = Home runs; RBI = Runs batted in; SB = Stolen bases; BB = Walks; K = Strikeouts; Avg. = Batting average; OBP = On base percentage; SLG = Slugging percentage; TB = Total bases

Player	G	AB	R	H	2B	3B	HR	RBI	SB	BB	K	AVG	OBP	SLG	TB
**Jesús Aguilar**	113	415	37	98	18	0	15	49	1	27	106	.236	.286	.388	161
Brian Anderson	98	338	43	75	16	1	8	28	1	37	101	.222	.311	.346	117
**Willians Astudillo**	21	54	5	13	0	0	1	4	1	1	3	.241	.255	.296	16
**Jon Berti**	102	358	47	86	17	3	4	28	41	42	89	.240	.321	.338	121
**JJ Bleday**	65	204	21	34	10	2	5	16	4	30	67	.167	.277	.309	63
**Peyton Burdick**	32	92	8	19	4	0	4	11	1	8	35	.207	.284	.380	35
**Jazz Chisholm Jr.**	60	213	39	54	10	4	14	45	12	21	66	.254	.325	.535	114
**Garrett Cooper**	119	414	37	108	33	2	9	50	0	40	119	.261	.337	.415	172
**Bryan De La Cruz**	115	329	38	83	20	0	13	43	4	19	90	.252	.294	.432	142
Lewin Díaz	58	160	12	27	4	0	5	11	1	11	54	.169	.224	.288	46
Joe Dunand	3	10	2	3	1	0	1	1	0	0	3	.300	.364	.700	7
Jerar Encarnación	23	77	7	14	3	0	3	14	2	3	32	.182	.210	.338	26
**Nick Fortes**	72	217	41	50	6	1	9	24	5	18	45	.230	.304	.392	85
**Avisaíl García**	98	357	31	80	9	0	8	35	4	17	109	.224	.266	.317	113
Erik González	16	37	4	7	1	0	0	3	1	4	12	.189	.268	.216	8
**Jordan Groshans**	17	61	9	16	0	0	1	2	0	4	13	.262	.308	.311	19
Billy Hamilton	20	13	9	1	0	0	0	0	7	1	8	.077	.143	.077	1
Payton Henry	15	28	2	4	0	0	0	4	0	5	8	.143	.314	.143	4
**Charles Leblanc**	48	156	18	41	10	0	4	11	4	12	53	.263	.320	.404	63
**Miguel Rojas**	140	471	34	111	19	2	6	36	9	26	61	.236	.283	.323	152
**Jesús Sánchez**	98	313	38	67	14	3	13	36	1	26	92	.214	.280	.403	126
**Jorge Soler**	72	270	32	56	13	0	13	34	0	31	90	.207	.295	.400	108
**Jacob Stallings**	114	346	25	77	12	0	4	34	0	29	83	.223	.292	.292	101
Joey Wendle	101	347	27	90	24	1	3	32	12	15	50	.259	.297	.360	125
**Luke Williams**	71	115	20	27	4	1	1	3	11	9	40	.235	.290	.313	36
**TEAM TOTALS**	162	5395	586	1241	248	20	144	554	122	436	1429	.230	.294	.363	1961

=== Pitching ===
(through October 5, 2022)
Players in bold are on the active roster.
Note: W = Wins; L = Losses; ERA = Earned run average; WHIP = Walks plus hits per inning pitched; G = Games pitched; GS = Games started; SV = Saves; IP = Innings pitched; H = Hits allowed; R = Runs allowed; ER = Earned runs allowed; BB = Walks allowed; K = Strikeouts

Player	W	L	ERA	WHIP	G	GS	SV	IP	H	R	ER	BB	K
**Sandy Alcántara**	14	9	2.28	0.98	32	32	0	228.2	174	67	58	50	207
Shawn Armstrong	0	0	10.80	1.95	7	0	0	6.2	10	10	8	3	5
**Willians Astudillo**	0	0	0.00	1.00	2	0	0	2.0	0	0	0	2	0
**Anthony Bass**	2	3	1.41	0.94	45	0	0	44.2	32	10	7	10	45
Anthony Bender	1	3	3.26	1.29	22	0	6	19.1	17	7	7	8	17
**Richard Bleier**	2	2	3.55	1.44	55	1	1	50.2	63	22	20	10	32
**Huascar Brazobán**	1	1	3.09	1.47	27	0	0	32.0	26	13	11	21	40
Jeff Brigham	0	1	3.38	1.33	16	0	1	24.0	22	10	9	10	28
Edward Cabrera	6	4	3.01	1.07	14	14	0	71.2	44	24	24	33	75
**Daniel Castano**	1	3	4.04	1.43	10	7	0	35.2	42	20	16	9	20
Jack Fishman	0	0	4.09	1.18	7	0	0	11.0	13	5	5	0	6
**Dylan Floro**	1	3	3.02	1.17	56	0	10	53.2	48	23	18	15	48
**Braxton Garrett**	3	7	3.58	1.25	17	17	0	88.0	86	38	35	24	90
**Louis Head**	0	0	7.23	1.56	23	0	1	23.2	26	19	19	11	23
Elieser Hernández	3	6	6.35	1.43	20	10	0	62.1	67	48	44	22	60
**Bryan Hoeing**	1	1	12.08	1.90	8	1	0	12.2	19	17	17	5	6
Jordan Holloway	0	0	3.38	1.50	1	0	0	2.2	3	1	1	1	2
A.J. Ladwig	0	0	10.80	1.80	1	0	0	3.1	6	4	4	0	0
**Pablo López**	10	10	3.75	1.17	32	32	0	180.0	157	78	75	53	174
Jesús Luzardo	4	7	3.32	1.04	18	18	0	100.1	69	40	37	35	120
**Max Meyer**	0	1	7.50	1.50	2	2	0	6.0	7	5	5	2	6
**Tommy Nance**	2	3	4.33	1.51	35	2	0	43.2	45	22	21	21	57
**Andrew Nardi**	1	1	9.82	2.66	13	0	0	14.2	25	17	16	14	24
Nick Neidert	0	1	3.60	1.00	1	1	0	5.0	5	2	2	0	3
**Steven Okert**	5	5	2.98	1.17	60	0	0	51.1	34	19	17	26	63
Zach Pop	2	0	3.60	1.25	18	0	0	20.0	23	9	8	2	14
Cody Poteet	0	1	3.86	1.21	12	2	0	28.0	23	12	12	11	21
**Trevor Rogers**	4	11	5.47	1.51	23	23	0	107.0	116	69	65	45	106
**Tanner Scott**	4	5	4.31	1.61	67	0	20	62.2	55	34	30	46	90
Cole Sulser	1	4	5.29	1.62	39	0	2	34.0	39	23	20	16	38
**Jimmy Yacabonis**	1	1	6.75	1.82	9	0	0	9.1	12	8	7	5	15
Aneurys Zabala	0	0	0.00	1.50	2	0	0	2.2	3	0	0	1	2
**TEAM TOTALS**	69	93	3.86	1.27	162	162	41	1437.1	1311	676	617	511	1437

== Farm system ==
Level	Team	League	Manager
Triple-A	Jacksonville Jumbo Shrimp	International League	Daren Brown
Double-A	Pensacola Blue Wahoos	Southern League	Kevin Randel
High-A	Beloit Sky Carp	Midwest League	Jorge Hernandez
Low-A	Jupiter Hammerheads	Florida State League	Ángel Espada
Rookie	FCL Marlins	Florida Complex League	Nelson Prada
Rookie	DSL Marlins	Dominican Summer League	Luis Dorante Sr.
