= Luis Marté =

Luis Marte or Luis Marté may refer to:

- Luis Marte (pitcher), American former baseball pitcher
- Luis Marté (infielder), American baseball infielder
