= Chad Wallach =

American baseball player (born 1991)

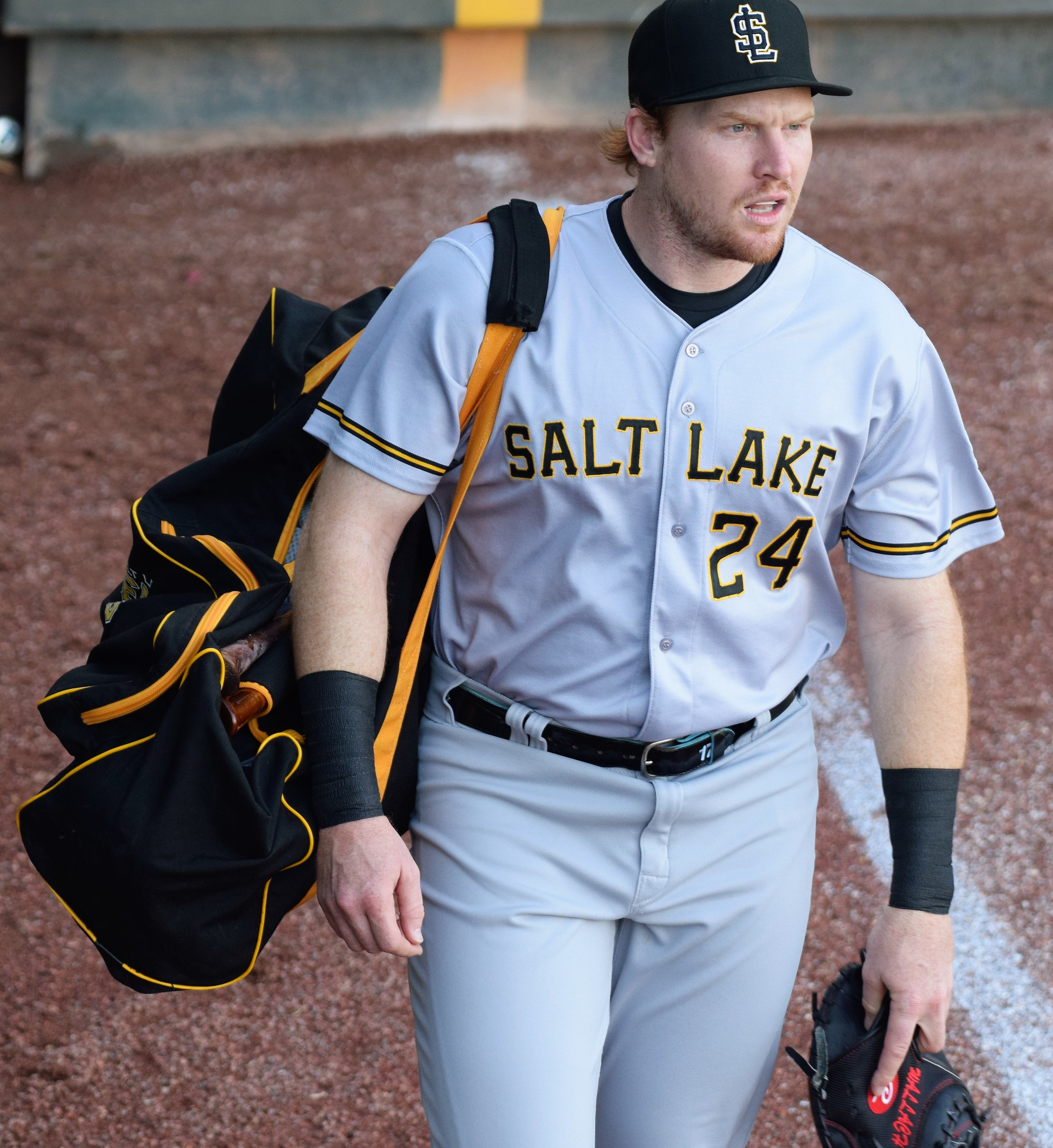
- Wallach with the Salt Lake Bees in 2022
- Catcher
- Born: November 4, 1991 (age 34); Yorba Linda, California, U.S.
- Batted: Right Threw: Right

MLB debut
- August 27, 2017, for the Cincinnati Reds

Last MLB appearance
- September 12, 2025, for the Los Angeles Angels

MLB statistics
- Batting average: .198
- Home runs: 11
- Runs batted in: 39
- Stats at Baseball Reference

Teams
- Cincinnati Reds (2017); Miami Marlins (2018–2021); Los Angeles Angels (2022–2023, 2025)

Chad Arthur Wallach (born November 4, 1991) is an American former professional baseball catcher. He played in Major League Baseball (MLB) for the Cincinnati Reds, Miami Marlins, and Los Angeles Angels. He was drafted by the Marlins in the fifth round of the 2013 MLB draft.

== Early life and college ==
Wallach grew up in Orange, California, and attended Calvary Chapel High School in Santa Ana, California. He was selected in the 43rd round of the 2010 Major League Baseball draft by the Los Angeles Dodgers, but opted not to sign in order to play college baseball at Cal State Fullerton. Wallach played three seasons with the Titans, hitting .272 in 102 games. As a junior, Wallach batted .309 with 24 runs scored, 14 doubles, two home runs and 32 RBIs and was drafted by the Miami Marlins in the fifth round of the 2013 Major League Baseball draft.

== Professional career ==
=== Miami Marlins ===
Wallach signed with the Marlins and received a $343,900 bonus and began his professional career with the Low-A Batavia Muckdogs, where he hit .226/.294/.267 in 43 games and 146 at bats. He began the 2014 season with the Single–A Greensboro Grasshoppers (for whom he was a mid-season South Atlantic League All Star) and was eventually promoted to the High–A Jupiter Hammerheads, batting .322/.431/.457 between the two teams.

=== Cincinnati Reds ===
On December 11, 2014, the Marlins traded Wallach and Anthony DeSclafani to the Cincinnati Reds in exchange for Mat Latos. In 2016 for Pensacola he batted .240/.363/.410.

The Reds promoted Wallach to the major leagues for the first time on August 25, 2017. He made his Major League debut on August 27, 2017, in a 5–2 loss to the Pittsburgh Pirates, starting at catcher and going 0–4 with two strikeouts. Wallach got his first career hit on September 20, 2017, as a pinch hitter. During the 2017 season, Wallach played in six games for the Reds and hit .091 (1 for 11). Playing for Louisville, he batted .226/.280/.398.

=== Miami Marlins (second stint) ===
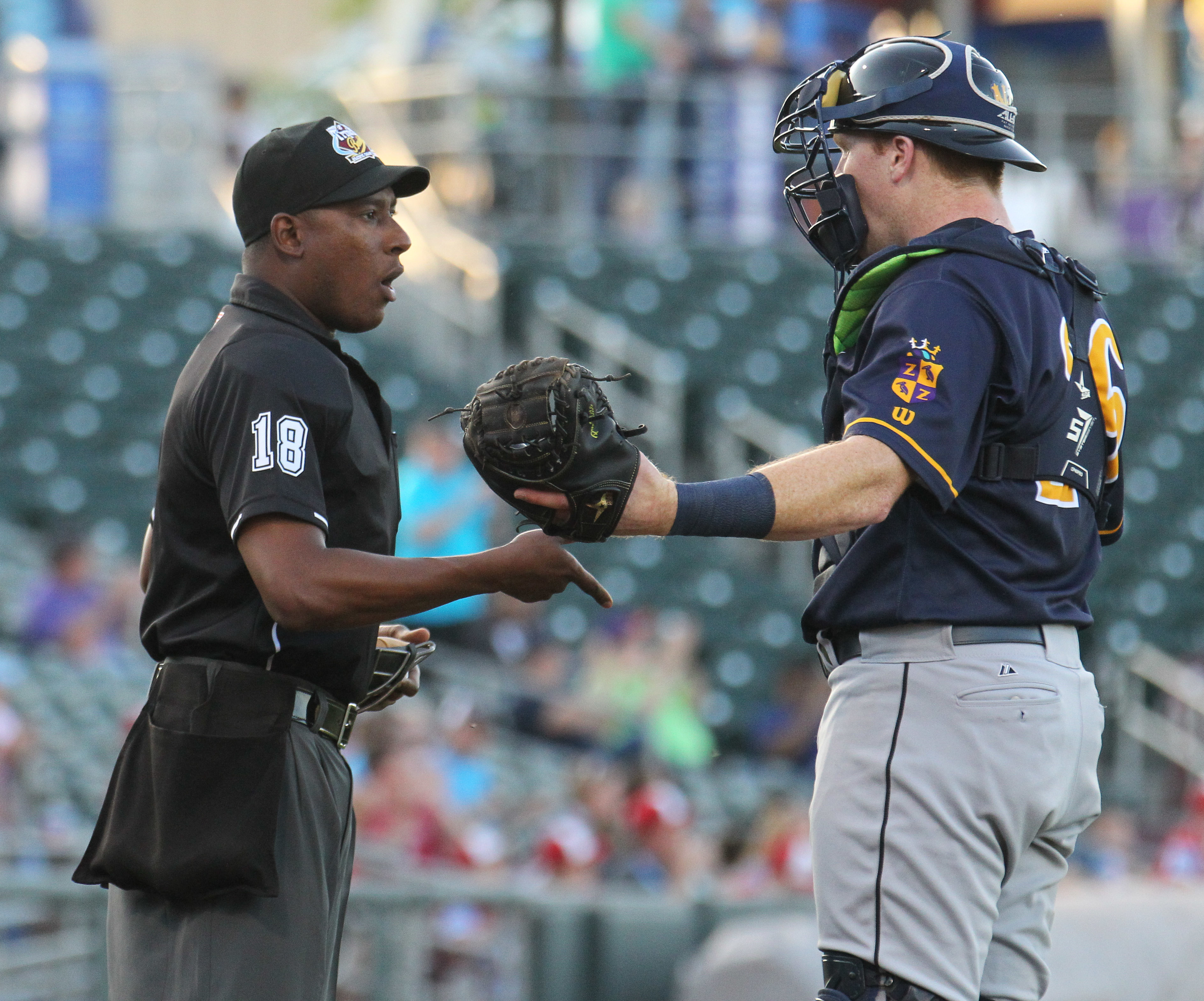
Wallach (right) arguing with umpire Ramon De Jesus while a member of the New Orleans Baby Cakes in 2018

Wallach was claimed off waivers by the Miami Marlins on November 3, 2017. He began the 2018 season with the Marlins on the Opening Day roster as their backup catcher but was ultimately sent down to the Triple-A New Orleans Baby Cakes after appearing in nine games when J. T. Realmuto was activated off the disabled list. He hit .224 in 147 at bats with three home runs and 16 RBIs in 44 games, as well as .357/.438/.429 in 14 at bats for the GCL Marlins, before being called back up to the Marlins on September 1, 2018. On September 23, he hit his first career home run. He finished the season batting .178/.275/.267 with one home run and five RBIs in 15 games with the Marlins.

Wallach made the Marlins opening day roster as the team's only backup catcher to start the 2019 season. In 2019 with the Marlins he batted .250/.333/.375 in 48 at bats. Playing for two minor league teams, he was 1-for-10. In 2020 for Miami, Wallach appeared in 15 regular season games, slashing .277/.364/.640 with 1 home run and 6 RBI in 44 at-bats. Wallach also played in five playoff games for the Marlins, where he lodged his first career postseason hit.

Wallach made the Marlins Opening Day roster again in 2021. Wallach was designated for assignment by Miami on July 24, 2021, after hitting .200/.242/.267 with no home runs in 22 games.

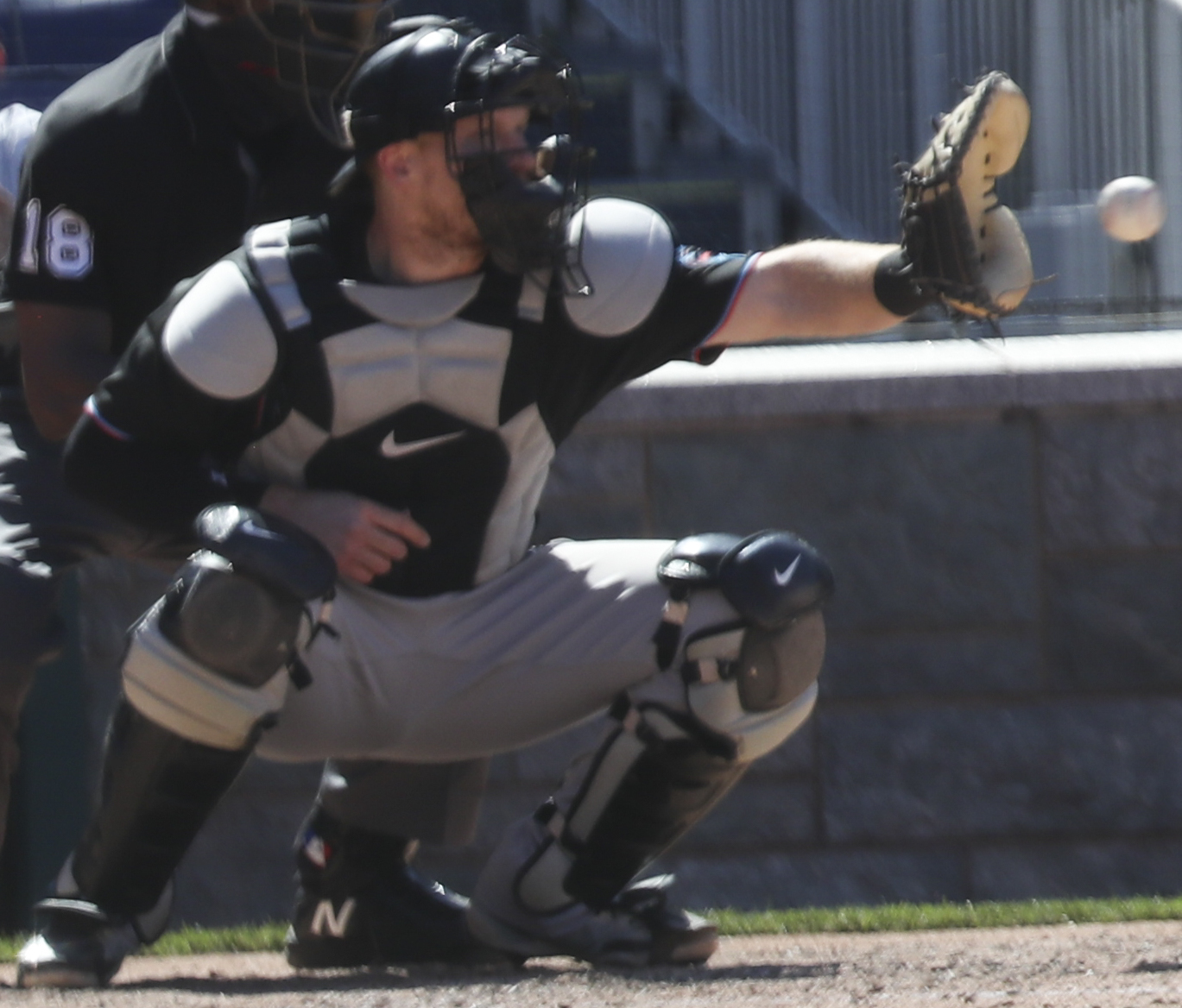
Wallach catching for the Miami Marlins in 2021

=== Los Angeles Dodgers ===
On July 30, 2021, Wallach was claimed off waivers by the Los Angeles Dodgers and assigned to the Triple-A Oklahoma City Dodgers. He played in 1 game for Oklahoma City, going 0-for-3 with a walk.

=== Los Angeles Angels ===
On August 7, 2021, Wallach was claimed off waivers by the Los Angeles Angels. He was assigned to the Triple-A Salt Lake Bees. Wallach played in 39 games for the Triple-A Salt Lake Bees, hitting .223/.322/.432, and did not appear in a big league game for the Angels. He was outrighted off the 40-man roster following the season on November 19. In 2022, he was a non-roster invitee to Angels spring training camp in Tempe, Arizona.

Wallach was selected to the 40-man roster on May 7, 2022. Three days later on May 10, he caught Reid Detmers' no-hitter, and also hit a 3-run homerun. Spending the remainder of the year on the 40-man roster, Wallach spent most of his time with Salt Lake. In 12 games for the Angels, Wallach hit .143/.231/.257 with one home run and 4 RBI. On November 3, after being sent outright to Triple-A, Wallach elected free agency.

On November 23, 2022, Wallach re-signed with the Angels on a minor league contract. Wallach began the 2023 season with Triple-A Salt Lake, and got off to a torrid start, hitting .361/.442/.556 with 2 home runs and 8 RBI in his first 11 games. On April 21, 2023, Wallach had his contract selected to the active roster. In 58 games for the Angels, he hit .209/.279/.403 with 7 home runs and 13 RBI. On August 18, Wallach was designated for assignment following the promotion of Nolan Schanuel. He cleared waivers and was sent outright to Triple–A Salt Lake on August 22. On August 25, Wallach was selected back to the active roster. In 65 total games for the Angels, he batted .197/.259/.376 and set new career–highs in home runs (7) and RBI (15). Following the season on October 16, Wallach was removed from the 40–man roster and sent outright to Triple–A Salt Lake. He elected free agency the next day.

On December 23, 2023, Wallach again re-signed with the Angels on a minor league contract. He played in 87 games for Triple-A Salt Lake, batting .247/.337/.430 with 12 home runs and 46 RBI. Wallach elected free agency following the season on November 4, 2024.

=== Texas Rangers ===
On January 19, 2025, Wallach signed a minor league contract with the Texas Rangers. In 28 appearances for the Triple-A Round Rock Express, he batted .245/.333/.408 with four home runs and 18 RBI. Wallach was released by the Rangers organization on June 5.

=== Los Angeles Angels (second stint) ===
On June 10, 2025, Wallach signed a minor league contract with the Los Angeles Angels. In 37 appearances for the Triple-A Salt Lake Bees, he batted .256/.311/.464 with six home runs and 25 RBI. On September 12, the Angels selected Wallach's contract, adding him to their active roster. He made one appearance for the Angels as a defensive replacement, and failed to record a plate appearance. Wallach was designated for assignment following Logan O'Hoppe's return from the injured list on September 15. He cleared waivers and was sent outright to Salt Lake on September 17. Wallach elected free agency on October 14.

=== Athletics ===
On January 18, 2026, Wallach signed a minor league contract with the Athletics. In 38 games with Triple-A Las Vegas Aviators he batted .228/.315/.354 with 3 home runs, 16 RBIs and one stolen base.

On October 12, 2026, Wallach announced his retirement from professional baseball via Instagram.

== Personal life ==
His father, Tim Wallach, was a five-time MLB All-Star during his seventeen seasons in MLB for the Montreal Expos, Los Angeles Dodgers and California Angels.

== See also ==
- List of second-generation Major League Baseball players
