= Brian Miller (baseball) =

American baseball player (born 1995)

- Outfielder
- Born: August 20, 1995 (age 30); Raleigh, North Carolina, U.S.
- Batted: Left Threw: Right

MLB debut
- July 30, 2021, for the Miami Marlins

Last MLB appearance
- October 3, 2021, for the Miami Marlins

MLB statistics
- Batting average: .273
- Home runs: 0
- Runs batted in: 0
- Stats at Baseball Reference

Teams
- Miami Marlins (2021)

Brian Christopher Miller (born August 20, 1995) is an American former professional baseball outfielder. He made his Major League Baseball (MLB) debut in 2021 for the Miami Marlins.

== Amateur career ==
Miller attended Millbrook High School in Raleigh, North Carolina. He committed to play college baseball for the University of North Carolina at Asheville, but decommitted when the school's coach was fired. He enrolled at the University of North Carolina at Chapel Hill and walked on to the North Carolina Tar Heels. In 2016, he played collegiate summer baseball with the Orleans Firebirds of the Cape Cod Baseball League, and was named a league all-star. In 2017, his junior year, he hit .343 with seven home runs and 49 RBIs in 63 games. The Miami Marlins selected Miller with the 36th overall selection of the 2017 MLB draft. Miller signed with the Marlins, receiving a $1,888,800 signing bonus.

== Professional career ==
=== Miami Marlins ===
The Marlins assigned Miller to the Greensboro Grasshoppers where he posted a .322 batting average with one home run, 28 RBIs, and 21 stolen bases in 57 games. He began 2018 with the Jupiter Hammerheads, with whom he was named a Florida State League All-Star, before being promoted to the Jacksonville Jumbo Shrimp in June. In 128 games between both clubs, he batted .295/.338/.355 with 43 RBIs and forty stolen bases. He returned to Jacksonville for the 2019 season, earning Southern League All-Star honors. Over 120 games, Miller slashed .265/.326/.354 with two home runs, 39 RBIs, and 22 stolen bases. He did not play a minor league game in 2020 due to the cancellation of the minor league season caused by the COVID-19 pandemic. He opened the 2021 season with Jacksonville.

On July 30, 2021, Miami selected Miller's contract and promoted him to the major leagues. He made his MLB debut that night, hitting a single off New York Yankees Jameson Taillon. After the season, on November 19, 2021, Miller was designated for assignment to make room for pitcher Louis Head who the Marlins acquired in a trade from the Tampa Bay Rays.

Miller spent the 2023 campaign with Jacksonville, hitting .241/.324/.322 with two home runs, 30 RBI, and 18 stolen bases. He elected free agency following the season on November 6, 2023.
