= Louis Head =

American baseball player (born 1990)

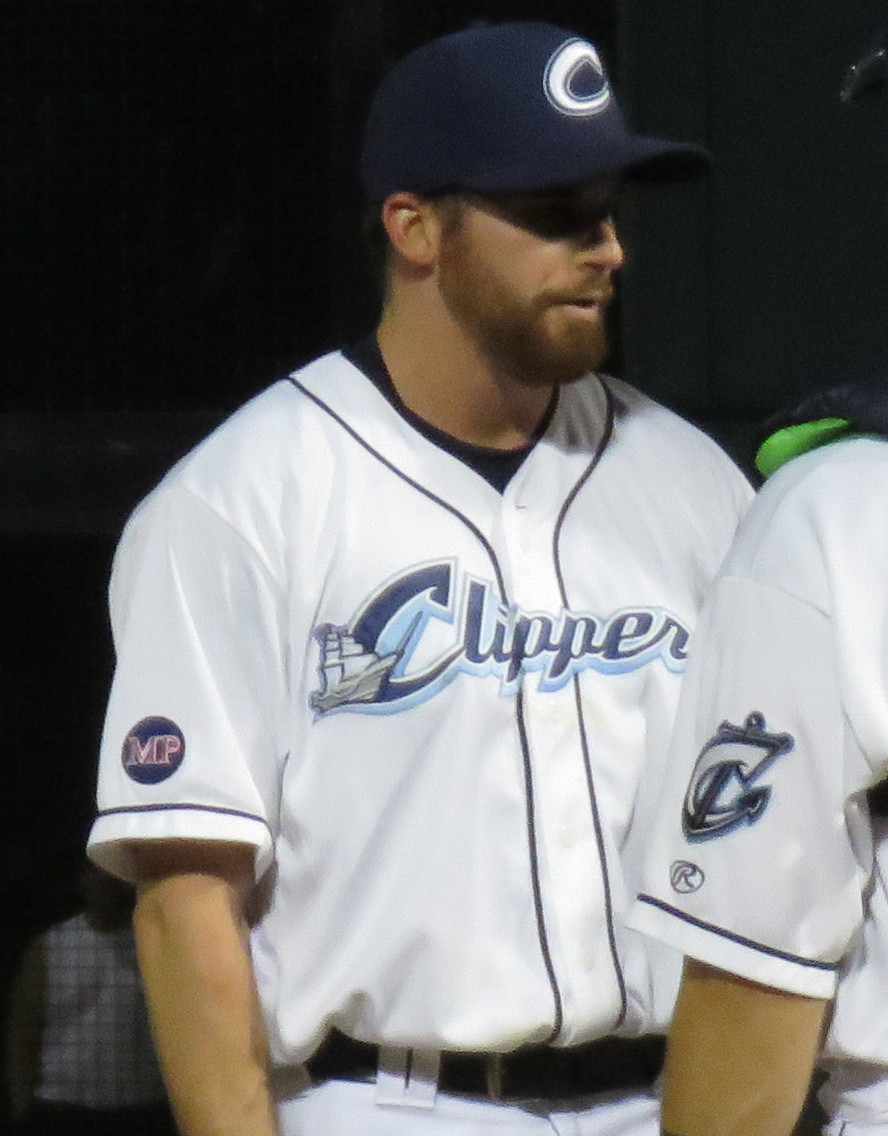
- Head with the Columbus Clippers in 2018
- Pitcher
- Born: April 23, 1990 (age 34); Houston, Texas, U.S.
- Batted: Right Threw: Right

MLB debut
- April 25, 2021, for the Tampa Bay Rays

Last MLB appearance
- August 24, 2022, for the Baltimore Orioles

MLB statistics
- Win–loss record: 2–0
- Earned run average: 4.10
- Strikeouts: 58
- Stats at Baseball Reference

Teams
- Tampa Bay Rays (2021); Miami Marlins (2022); Baltimore Orioles (2022)

Louis Gibson Head (born April 23, 1990) is an American former professional baseball pitcher. He was drafted in the 18th round of the 2012 Major League Baseball draft by the Cleveland Indians. Head played college baseball for the Texas Tech Red Raiders and the Texas State Bobcats. He played in Major League Baseball (MLB) for the Tampa Bay Rays, Miami Marlins, and Baltimore Orioles.

== Amateur career ==
Head was born in Houston and grew up in Katy, Texas and attended Cinco Ranch High School. Head played college baseball at Texas Tech University for two seasons before transferring to Texas State University. As a junior, he went 2–2 with 4.20 ERA and three saves in 18 appearances.

== Professional career ==
=== Cleveland Indians ===
Head was selected in the 18th round of the 2012 Major League Baseball draft by the Cleveland Indians. He began his professional career with the Low-A Mahoning Valley Scrappers. He split the 2013 season with the Single-A Lake County Captains and the High-A Carolina Mudcats, also appearing in one game for the Triple-A Columbus Clippers, registering a cumulative 4–4 record and 2.48 ERA with 66 strikeouts. He split the next season between Carolina and the Double-A Akron RubberDucks. In 2015 and 2016, Head played in Akron, pitching to a 4.03 ERA with 59 strikeouts in 2015 and a 2.66 ERA with 61 strikeouts in 2016. He spent the 2017 season in Columbus, recording a 3–2 record and 3.23 ERA in 61 1/3 innings pitched. Head was invited to Spring Training with the Indians in 2018, but did not make the club and was assigned to Columbus to begin the season. On August 2, 2018, Head was released by the Indians after pitching to a 12.64 ERA in 15 2/3 innings for Columbus.

=== Los Angeles Dodgers ===
On February 23, 2019, Head signed a minor league deal with the Los Angeles Dodgers organization. He was assigned to the Double-A Tulsa Drillers to begin the season. He split the 2019 season between four minor league affiliates, including the Triple-A Oklahoma City Dodgers, registering a 6.34 ERA with 40 strikeouts in 32 2/3 innings of work. Head elected free agency following the season on November 4.

=== Seattle Mariners ===
On February 27, 2020, Head signed a minor league contract with the Seattle Mariners organization. He was assigned to the Triple-A Tacoma Rainiers to begin the season but was released on May 27. He did not play in a game in 2020 due to the cancellation of the Minor League Baseball season because of the COVID-19 pandemic, and sold solar panels door-to-door in Arizona in his time away from affiliated ball.

=== Tampa Bay Rays ===
On February 12, 2021, Head signed a minor league contract with the Tampa Bay Rays organization and was invited to spring training as a non-roster invitee. In seven spring appearances, Head pitched to a 1.50 ERA and 0.67 WHIP in six innings of work, but did not make the club out of spring training. Head was selected to the Rays major league roster on April 23, 2021, which was also his 31st birthday. On April 25, Head made his MLB debut against the Toronto Blue Jays, pitching a scoreless inning of relief.

=== Miami Marlins ===
On November 14, 2021, the Rays traded Head to the Miami Marlins for Josh Roberson. To make room on the 40-man roster, outfielder Brian Miller was designated for assignment.

=== Baltimore Orioles ===
Head was claimed off waivers by the Baltimore Orioles on July 12, 2022. He made five relief appearances with the Orioles and allowed one run and six hits in five innings of work. On October 14, Head was designated for assignment following the waiver claims of Aramis Garcia and Mark Kolozsvary. He elected free agency following the season on November 10.

=== Philadelphia Phillies ===
On January 11, 2023, Head signed a minor league contract with the Philadelphia Phillies organization. He pitched in 11 games for the Triple-A Lehigh Valley IronPigs, struggling to a 10.80 ERA with 14 strikeouts in 11 2/3 innings of work. Head was released by the Phillies on May 30.

== Personal life ==
Head and his wife, Jenny, married in March 2021.
