= A. J. Ladwig =

American baseball player (born 1992)

- Pitcher
- Born: December 24, 1992 (age 33); Omaha, Nebraska, U.S.
- Batted: Right Threw: Right

MLB debut
- August 13, 2022, for the Miami Marlins

Last MLB appearance
- August 13, 2022, for the Miami Marlins

MLB statistics
- Win–loss record: 0–0
- Earned run average: 10.80
- Strikeouts: 0
- Stats at Baseball Reference

Teams
- Miami Marlins (2022)

Adam Joseph Ladwig (born December 24, 1992) is an American former professional baseball pitcher. He pitched in one game in Major League Baseball (MLB) for the Miami Marlins in 2022.

== Amateur career ==
Ladwig played high school at Millard West High School and college baseball for the Wichita State Shockers.

== Professional career ==
Ladwig was first drafted by the Philadelphia Phillies in the 45th round of the 2011 Major League Baseball draft out of high school, but he did not sign with Philadelphia.

=== Detroit Tigers ===
Three years later, he was drafted by the Detroit Tigers in the 11th round, with the 340th overall selection, of the 2014 Major League Baseball draft and signed. He spent his first professional season split between the Low-A Connecticut Tigers and rookie-level Gulf Coast Tigers, recording an 0-7 record and 5.14 ERA across 13 contests.

In 2015, Ladwig spent the year with the Single-A West Michigan Whitecaps, making 22 starts and logging a 12-9 record and 3.59 ERA with 85 strikeouts in 138.0 innings pitched. He spent the 2016 season with the High-A Lakeland Flying Tigers, registering a 12-9 record and 3.69 ERA with 101 strikeouts in 153.2 innings of work. In 2017, Ladwig split the year between Lakeland, the Double-A Erie SeaWolves, and the Triple-A Toledo Mud Hens. In 28 games (27 starts) between the three affiliates, he pitched to a 10-9 record and 5.01 ERA with 101 strikeouts in 142.0 innings of work.

Ladwig spent the 2018 season back with Toledo and Erie, making 25 appearances (23 starts) and posting a 10-6 record and 4.78 ERA with 98 strikeouts in 133.2 innings pitched. Ladwig underwent Tommy John surgery prior to the 2019 season and missed the entire year as a result. He did not play in a game in 2020 due to the cancellation of the minor league season because of the COVID-19 pandemic.

He returned to action in 2021, making 24 appearances (21 starts) split between Erie and Toledo, and registering a 6-7 record and 4.49 ERA with 87 strikeouts in 108.1 innings pitched. He began the 2022 season appearing in 4 games for Erie and 1 for Toledo. On May 17, 2022, Ladwig was released by the Tigers organization.

=== Miami Marlins ===
On May 25, 2022, Ladwig signed a minor league contract with the Miami Marlins organization. He was assigned to the Triple-A Jacksonville Jumbo Shrimp, where he pitched to an 8-5 record and 4.13 ERA with 63 strikeouts in 16 games (15 starts).

On August 13, 2022, Ladwig was selected to the 40-man roster and promoted to the major leagues for the first time to serve as the Marlins' 27th man in the team's doubleheader. He made his MLB debut that day, allowing six runs in 3 1/3 innings against the Atlanta Braves. He was designated for assignment the following day. He cleared waivers and was sent outright to the Double-A Pensacola Blue Wahoos on August 16. He elected free agency following the season on November 10.

On March 31, 2023, Ladwig announced his retirement from professional baseball via Instagram.
