= Paul Campbell (pitcher) =

American baseball player (born 1995)

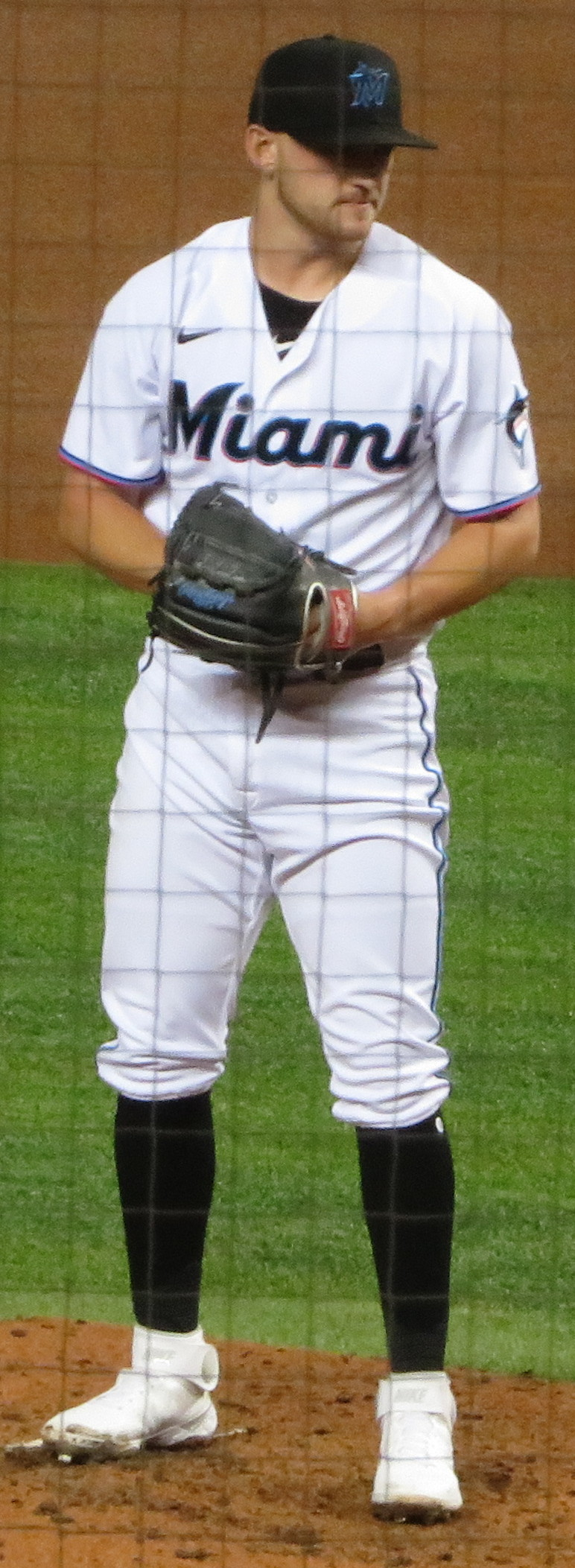
- Campbell with the Miami Marlins

Free agent
- Pitcher
- Born: July 26, 1995 (age 31); Malden, Massachusetts, U.S.
- Bats: Left Throws: Right

MLB debut
- April 3, 2021, for the Miami Marlins

MLB statistics (through 2021 season)
- Win–loss record: 2–3
- Earned run average: 6.41
- Strikeouts: 26
- Stats at Baseball Reference

Teams
- Miami Marlins (2021)

Paul Alan Campbell (born July 26, 1995) is an American professional baseball pitcher who is a free agent. He has previously played in Major League Baseball (MLB) for the Miami Marlins.

== Career ==
Campbell graduated from Malden Catholic High School in Malden, Massachusetts, in 2014. He attended Clemson University, where he played college baseball for the Clemson Tigers from 2015 through 2017.

=== Tampa Bay Rays ===
The Tampa Bay Rays selected Campbell in the 21st round, with the 619th overall selection, of the 2017 Major League Baseball draft. Campbell finished 2019 with the Double-A Montgomery Biscuits, pitching to a 8–4 win–loss record and a 3.36 earned run average (ERA) with 63 strikeouts across 85 2/3 innings pitched in 16 appearances. Through the 2019 season, Campbell had a career 3.12 ERA through 233 1/3 minor league innings in three years in the Rays' minor league system.

=== Miami Marlins ===
On December 10, 2020, the Miami Marlins selected Campbell from the Rays in the Rule 5 draft. Campbell made the Marlins' Opening Day roster for the 2021 season. On April 3, 2021, Campbell made his MLB debut in relief against the Tampa Bay Rays. He started his first MLB game on May 1. On May 3, Campbell was suspended 80 games after violating MLB's Joint Drug Prevention and Treatment Program, testing positive for Dehydrochlormethyltestosterone (DHCMT), an anabolic-androgenic steroid. Chlorodehydromethyltestosterone (DHCMT) was the substance involved in certain MLB disciplinary disputes. Following the 2022 Major League Baseball Players Association–Major League Baseball CBA and updated Joint Drug Prevention and Treatment Program, DHCMT was no longer explicitly singled out in the same manner under prior enforcement language, leading some to characterize it as having been “removed” from the banned substance list—though anabolic steroids as a prohibited class remained banned. Campbell made 16 appearances for Miami in 2021, pitching to a 2–3 record and 6.41 ERA with 26 strikeouts in 26 2/3 innings pitched.

On May 27, 2022, Campbell was placed on the 60-day injured list with a right elbow strain. On August 30, it was announced that Campbell had undergone Tommy John surgery and would miss the remainder of the season season as well as most of the 2023 season. He was removed from the 40-man roster and sent outright to the Triple–A Jacksonville Jumbo Shrimp on November 2.

Campbell returned to action in 2024 with the Single–A Jupiter Hammerheads and Double–A Pensacola Blue Wahoos. In 11 starts between the two affiliates, he accumulated a 5–1 record and 3.78 ERA with 42 strikeouts across 50 innings pitched. Campbell was released by the Marlins organization on July 29, 2024.

=== Chicago Cubs ===
On February 23, 2026, Campbell signed with El Águila de Veracruz of the Mexican League. He had been previously pitching in the Mexican Pacific League with the Naranjeros de Hermosillo, registering 3–1 record with a 6.00 ERA and 20 strikeouts. However on April 14, Campbell signed a minor league contract with the Chicago Cubs. He made 18 appearances (including nine starts) for the Triple–A Iowa Cubs, struggling to a 2–5 record and 7.33 ERA with 62 strikeouts across 66 1/3 innings pitched. Campbell was released by Chicago on August 9.

== See also ==
- List of Major League Baseball players suspended for performance-enhancing drugs
- Rule 5 draft results
