= Luís Madero =

Venezuelan baseball player (born 1997)

- Pitcher
- Born: April 15, 1997 (age 28); Maracay, Venezuela
- Batted: Right Threw: Right

MLB debut
- May 10, 2021, for the Miami Marlins

Last MLB appearance
- September 30, 2021, for the Miami Marlins

MLB statistics
- Win–loss record: 0–0
- Earned run average: 9.00
- Strikeouts: 4
- Stats at Baseball Reference

Teams
- Miami Marlins (2021)

Luís Alejandro Madero (born April 15, 1997) is a Venezuelan former professional baseball pitcher. He was signed by the Arizona Diamondbacks as an international free agent in 2013, and has played in Major League Baseball (MLB) for the Miami Marlins.

== Professional career ==
=== Arizona Diamondbacks ===
On October 1, 2013, Madero signed with the Diamondbacks as an international free agent when he was only 16 years old for $160,000. He made his professional debut in 2014 with the DSL Diamondbacks, and spent the whole season there, going 6–4 with a 2.40 ERA in 13 games started, with 76 strikeouts (4th in the league) in 66.2 innings. In 2015, he pitched for the AZL Diamondbacks for whom he pitched to a 5–5 record, 2.30 ERA, and 0.99 WHIP in 54.2 innings pitched (13 games; 2 starts).

In 2016, Madero played for the Missoula Osprey and the AZL Diamondbacks for whom he posted a combined 3–4 record and 6.03 ERA in 14 games (11 starts). Madero began 2017 with Missoula and was promoted to the Hillsboro Hops in July.

=== Los Angeles Angels ===
On July 31, 2017, Madero was traded to the Los Angeles Angels for David Hernandez. He was then assigned to the Burlington Bees and spent the remainder of the season with them. In 15 starts between the three clubs, he compiled a 5–4 record and 6.42 ERA.

Madero spent 2018 with Burlington of the Single–A Midwest League, with whom he was a mid-season All Star, and the Inland Empire 66ers of the High–A California League. He pitched to a combined 4–8 record with a 3.49 ERA in 23 starts. His fastball averaged 94 mph.

The Angels added Madero to their 40-man roster after the 2018 season. He returned to the 66ers to begin 2019 before, being promoted to the Mobile BayBears of the Double–A Southern League. Over 24 games (22 starts), he went 6–11 with a 5.03 ERA, striking out 98 over 105 2/3 innings. He had rates of 8.3 K/9, 2.6 BB/9, and a 47 percent ground ball induced rate.

On January 14, 2020, Madero was designated for assignment by the Angels following the acquisition of Matt Andriese.

=== San Francisco Giants ===
On January 21, 2020, Madero was claimed off waivers by the San Francisco Giants. On February 7, Madero was outrighted off of the 40-man roster. Madero did not play in a game in 2020 due to the cancellation of the minor league season because of the COVID-19 pandemic. On July 3, Madero tested positive for COVID-19. He was added to the Giants’ 60-man player pool for the COVID-19–shortened 2020 season but did not make an appearance for the big league club. On November 2, Madero elected free agency.

=== Miami Marlins ===
On November 23, 2020, Madero signed a minor league contract with the Miami Marlins organization that included an invitation to spring training. He was assigned to the Triple–A Jacksonville Jumbo Shrimp to begin the 2021 season.

On May 9, 2021, Madero was selected to the 40–man roster and promoted to the major leagues for the first time. He made his MLB debut the next day against the Arizona Diamondbacks, pitching two scoreless innings of relief. In the game he notched his first major league strikeout, punching out Diamondbacks pitcher Luke Weaver. After allowing five earned runs in three innings of work, Madero was designated for assignment on May 12. He was outrighted to Triple-A Jacksonville on May 15. On June 14, Madero was re-selected to the active roster. He was designated for assignment two days later without making an appearance. He was outrighted to Jacksonville on June 18. On July 20, Madero was selected to the active roster for a third time. On July 27, Madero was designated for assignment by the Marlins for a third time, with a scoreless innings of work against the San Diego Padres being his only appearance between designations. On August 17, the Marlins selected Madero's contract. Two days later, August 19, he was designated for assignment once again by the Marlins. On August 23, Madero cleared waivers and once again was assigned to Triple-A Jacksonville. Madero was yet again selected to the major league roster on September 22. Madero recorded a 9.00 ERA in 6 appearances with 4 strikeouts. Madero was designated for assignment again on October 1. On October 5, Madero elected free agency.

=== Sioux City Explorers ===
On April 6, 2022, Madero signed with the Sioux City Explorers of the American Association of Professional Baseball. He did not appear in any games for the team during the 2022 season. In 2023, Madero appeared in 5 games for Sioux City and registered a 4.05 ERA with 6 strikeouts in 6 2/3 innings pitched.

=== Gary SouthShore RailCats ===
On July 1, 2023, Madero was claimed off waivers by the Gary SouthShore RailCats of the American Association of Professional Baseball. He did not make an appearance for the RailCats before he was released by the team on August 15.
