= Jordan Holloway =

American baseball player (born 1996)

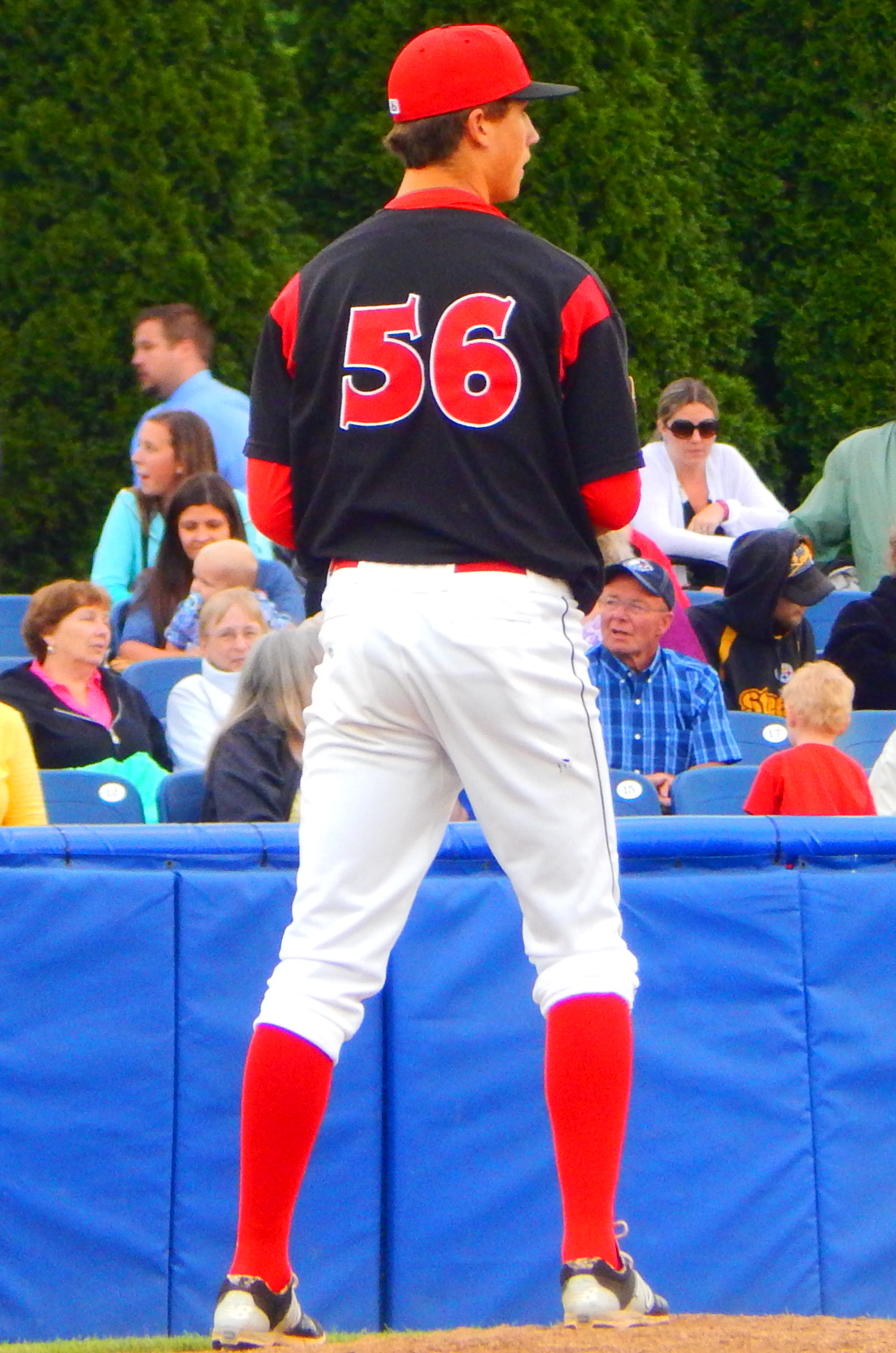
- Holloway with the Batavia Muckdogs in 2015

Free agent
- Pitcher
- Born: June 13, 1996 (age 30); Arvada, Colorado, U.S.
- Bats: Right Throws: Right

MLB debut
- July 26, 2020, for the Miami Marlins

MLB statistics (through 2022 season)
- Win–loss record: 2–3
- Earned run average: 3.92
- Strikeouts: 38
- Stats at Baseball Reference

Teams
- Miami Marlins (2020–2022)

Jordan Lee Holloway (born June 13, 1996) is an American professional baseball pitcher who is a free agent. He has previously played in Major League Baseball (MLB) for the Miami Marlins.

== Career ==
=== Amateur career ===
Holloway attended Ralston Valley High School in Arvada, Colorado. As a senior, he went 6–1 with a 2.60 ERA with fifty strikeouts in 43 innings, earning himself a spot on the Denver Post All-Colorado team. After his senior year, he was drafted by the Miami Marlins in the 20th round of the 2014 MLB draft. He signed with Miami, forgoing his commitment to play college baseball at the University of Nebraska Omaha.

=== Miami Marlins ===
After signing, Holloway made his professional debut with the Gulf Coast League Marlins where he pitched to a 1–3 record with a 6.41 ERA in ten games (six starts). In 2015, he began the year with the Greensboro Grasshoppers before being reassigned to the Batavia Muckdogs, with whom he was named a New York-Penn League All-Star. In 14 starts for Batavia, he went 5–6 with a 2.91 ERA. He spent 2016 with both Greensboro and Batavia, compiling a combined 2–7 record and 6.19 ERA over 13 starts between the two teams, and in 2017, he pitched for Greensboro where he went 1–2 with a 5.22 ERA in 11 starts, In 2018, he pitched only 7 2/3 innings due to injury.

The Marlins added him to their 40-man roster after the 2018 season. He spent 2019 with the Jupiter Hammerheads and earned Florida State League All-Star honors. Over 21 starts, he went 4–11 with a 4.45 ERA, striking out 93 over 95 innings.

Holloway made the Opening Day roster in 2020, and made his major league debut on July 26 against the Philadelphia Phillies, and pitched a scoreless 1/3 inning. His rookie campaign consisted of his only appearance. In 2021, Holloway appeared in 13 games for Miami, logging a 2-3 record and 4.00 ERA with 36 strikeouts in 36.0 innings pitched.

Most of Holloway’s season in 2022 was spent with the Triple-A Jacksonville Jumbo Shrimp. He made one sole appearance for the big league club, allowing one run in 2 2/3 innings against the Cincinnati Reds. Holloway was placed on the 60-day injured list on August 1, and underwent arthroscopic surgery on his right elbow on August 9, ending his season. On November 8, Holloway was removed from the 40-man roster and sent outright to Triple-A. He elected free agency following the season on November 10.

=== Chicago Cubs ===
On January 23, 2023, Holloway signed a minor league contract with the Chicago Cubs organization. After rehabbing an oblique injury with the Single–A Myrtle Beach Pelicans, Holloway was assigned to the Triple–A Iowa Cubs. In 8 games in Iowa, he struggled to a 10.29 ERA with 15 strikeouts in 7.0 innings pitched. Holloway opted out of his minor league contract and became a free agent on July 1.

=== Chicago White Sox ===
On July 5, 2023, Holloway signed a minor league contract with the Chicago White Sox organization. In 25 relief appearances for the Triple–A Charlotte Knights, he struggled to a 7.45 ERA with 30 strikeouts across 19 1/3 innings of work. Holloway elected free agency following the season on November 6.

=== Seattle Mariners ===
On February 9, 2024, Holloway signed a minor league contract with the Seattle Mariners. In 35 appearances for the Triple-A Tacoma Rainiers, he struggled to a 10.02 ERA and 2-0 record with 43 strikeouts across 32 1/3 innings pitched. Holloway elected free agency following the season on November 4.

=== Los Angeles Angels ===
On April 23, 2025, Holloway signed a minor league contract with the Los Angeles Angels. He made 21 appearances for the rookie-level Arizona Complex League Angels and Double-A Rocket City Trash Pandas, compiling an 0-1 record and 3.68 ERA with 25 strikeouts over 22 innings of work. Holloway elected free agency following the season on November 6.
