= Luis Marté (infielder) =

Dominican-American baseball player (born 1993)

Free agent
- Infielder
- Born: December 15, 1993 (age 32); San Francisco de Macorís, Dominican Republic
- Bats: Right Throws: Right

MLB debut
- June 1, 2021, for the Miami Marlins

MLB statistics (through 2021 season)
- Batting average: .167
- Home runs: 0
- Runs batted in: 0
- Stats at Baseball Reference

Teams
- Miami Marlins (2021)

Luis Daniel Marté (born December 15, 1993) is a Dominican professional baseball infielder who is a free agent. He has previously played in Major League Baseball (MLB) for the Miami Marlins. He signed with the Texas Rangers as an international free agent in 2011.

== Career ==
=== Texas Rangers ===
On May 27, 2011, Marté signed with the Texas Rangers organization as an international free agent. He made his professional debut with the DSL Rangers and also played for the Arizona League Rangers, hitting .285 in 67 games between the two.

In 2012, he played for the AZL Rangers, batting only .187 in 44 games. The next year, he played for the Single-A Hickory Crawdads, batting .217/.245/.277 with 3 home runs and 27 RBI in 125 games. He remained in Hickory in 2014, slashing .270/.297/.317 in 72 games. He split the 2015 season between the High-A High Desert Mavericks and the Double-A Frisco RoughRiders, accumulating a .236/.248/.325 batting line in 122 contests.

He spent the 2016 season in Frisco, hitting .271/.289/.394 with 5 home runs and 32 RBI. In 2017, Marté split the year between Frisco and the Triple-A Round Rock Express, posting a .244/.257/.358 batting line with 7 home runs and 42 RBI in 99 games. He elected free agency following the season on November 6, 2017, but quickly re–signed with the team on a minor league deal. Marté began the 2018 season with Frisco but was released on May 18, 2018 after batting .223 in 31 games.

=== Atlanta Braves ===
On May 23, 2018, Marté signed a minor league contract with the Atlanta Braves organization. He finished the season split between the Double-A Mississippi Braves and the Triple-A Gwinnett Stripers, notching 4 home runs and 37 RBI between the two clubs. He spent the 2019 season in Gwinnett, posting a .260/.294/.346 batting line with 5 home runs and 33 RBI in 86 games. Adams elected free agency following the season on November 4, 2019.

=== Miami Marlins ===
On January 19, 2021, Marté signed a minor league contract with the Miami Marlins organization that included an invitation to Spring Training. He did not make the club and was assigned to the Triple-A Jacksonville Jumbo Shrimp, where he batted .263/.279/.456 with 3 home runs and 11 RBI to begin the season.

On May 28, 2021, Marté was selected to the 40-man roster and promoted to the major leagues for the first time. He made his MLB debut on June 1 as the starting second baseman against the Toronto Blue Jays. In the game, he went 0-for-2 with a walk. On June 3, Marté was designated for assignment by Miami. He was outrighted to Jacksonville on June 6. On June 19, Marté was re-selected to the active roster. On June 24, Marté notched his first career hit, a single off of Washington Nationals reliever Justin Miller. After going 1-for-4 in 3 games, Marté was again designated for assignment by Miami on June 30. He was again removed from the 40-man roster and sent outright to Triple-A Jacksonville on July 2. Marté elected free agency following the season on November 7.
