= Cody Poteet =

American baseball player (born 1994)

Free agent
- Pitcher
- Born: July 30, 1994 (age 32); San Diego, California, U.S.
- Bats: Right Throws: Right

MLB debut
- May 12, 2021, for the Miami Marlins

MLB statistics (through 2025 season)
- Win–loss record: 5–4
- Earned run average: 4.20
- Strikeouts: 70
- Stats at Baseball Reference

Teams
- Miami Marlins (2021–2022); New York Yankees (2024); Baltimore Orioles (2025)

Cody Austin Poteet (born July 30, 1994) is an American professional baseball pitcher who is a free agent. He has previously played in Major League Baseball (MLB) for the Miami Marlins, New York Yankees, and Baltimore Orioles.

== Amateur career ==
Poteet attended Christian High School in El Cajon, California. After his senior year, he was selected by the Washington Nationals in the 27th round of the 2012 MLB draft, but did not sign and instead enrolled at the University of California, Los Angeles (UCLA) to play college baseball for the UCLA Bruins. In 2014, he played collegiate summer baseball with the Yarmouth–Dennis Red Sox of the Cape Cod Baseball League. As a junior at UCLA in 2015, he appeared in 27 games (13 starts) and pitched to a 7–1 record with a 2.45 ERA; he was also second for the Bruins in strikeouts with 68 over 73 1/3 innings.

== Professional career ==
=== Miami Marlins ===
After his junior year, Poteet was selected by the Miami Marlins in the fourth round of the 2015 MLB draft. He signed with the Marlins for $488,700 and was assigned to the Batavia Muckdogs of the Low–A New York–Penn League where he posted a 2.13 ERA in 12 2/3 innings pitched. In 2016, he played for the Greensboro Grasshoppers of the Single–A South Atlantic League where he started 24 games, pitching to a 4–9 record with a 2.91 ERA, and in 2017, he pitched with the Jupiter Hammerheads of the High–A Florida State League and posted a 3–7 record with a 4.16 ERA in 16 games (14 starts), earning All-Star honors. In 2018, he played with both Jupiter and the Jacksonville Jumbo Shrimp of the Double–A Southern League, pitching to a combined 4–15 record and 4.98 ERA over 26 games (25 starts) between both teams. He returned to Jacksonville to begin 2019, where he was named an All-Star, and was promoted to the Triple–A New Orleans Baby Cakes of the Pacific Coast League in June. Over 23 starts between the two clubs, he went 7–6 with a 3.56 ERA, striking out 92 over 136 1/3 innings. Poteet did not play a minor league game in 2020 due to the cancellation of the minor league season caused by the COVID-19 pandemic. To begin the 2021 season, he was assigned to Jacksonville, now members of the Triple-A East.

On May 12, 2021, Poteet was selected to active roster and promoted to the major leagues for the first time. He made his major league debut that night as the team's starting pitcher versus the Arizona Diamondbacks, and picked up the win after pitching five innings, giving up two earned runs. In the game, he also recorded his first MLB strikeout against catcher Stephen Vogt. He was placed on the 10-day injured list with a right knee sprain in late June, and was transferred to the 60-day injured list in late August, effectively ending his season. He finished his first major league season with the Marlins starting seven games with a 2-3 record, a 4.99 ERA, and 32 strikeouts over 30 2/3 innings.

Poteet pitched in 12 games for Miami in 2022, posting a 3.86 ERA with 21 strikeouts in 28.0 innings of work. On August 9, 2022, it was announced that Poteet would require Tommy John surgery and would miss the remainder of the season. On November 8, Poteet was removed from the 40-man roster and sent outright to Triple–A; he elected free agency two days later.

=== Kansas City Royals ===
On December 15, 2022, Poteet signed a minor league deal with the Kansas City Royals. Poteet spent the majority of the 2023 season recovering from surgery, and made one scoreless appearance for the Triple–A Omaha Storm Chasers. Following the season on December 16, 2023, Poteet was released by the Royals organization.

=== New York Yankees ===
On January 5, 2024, Poteet signed a one-year, $750,000 contract with the New York Yankees. He was optioned to the Triple–A Scranton/Wilkes-Barre RailRiders to begin the 2024 season. The Yankees promoted him to the major leagues as their 27th man to start the second game of a doubleheader on April 13, a game in which he earned the victory, pitching six innings and surrendering one earned run in an 8-2 Yankees win. Poteet was placed on the injured list with a right triceps strain on June 18, and was transferred to the 60–day injured list on August 1. He was activated on September 20. Poteet made 5 appearances (4 starts) for the Yankees, logging a 3–0 record and 2.22 ERA with 16 strikeouts across 24 1/3 innings pitched.

=== Baltimore Orioles ===
On December 17, 2024, the Yankees traded Poteet to the Chicago Cubs in exchange for Cody Bellinger and $5 million. Poteet was optioned to the Triple-A Iowa Cubs to begin the 2025 season. He was designated for assignment by the Cubs on March 27, 2025.

On March 29, 2025, Poteet was traded to the Baltimore Orioles in exchange for cash considerations. He made one appearance for Baltimore before he was placed on the injured list with right shoulder inflammation on April 22. Poteet was transferred to the 60-day injured list on May 30. On August 30, Poteet was activated from the injured list; however, he was subsequently removed from the 40-man roster and sent outright to the Triple-A Norfolk Tides. He elected free agency on September 1, rather than accepting the assignment.

== Personal life ==
Poteet and his wife, Madeline (a former UCLA women's basketball player), were married in August 2014 on the UCLA campus.
