= Nick Neidert =

American baseball player (born 1996)

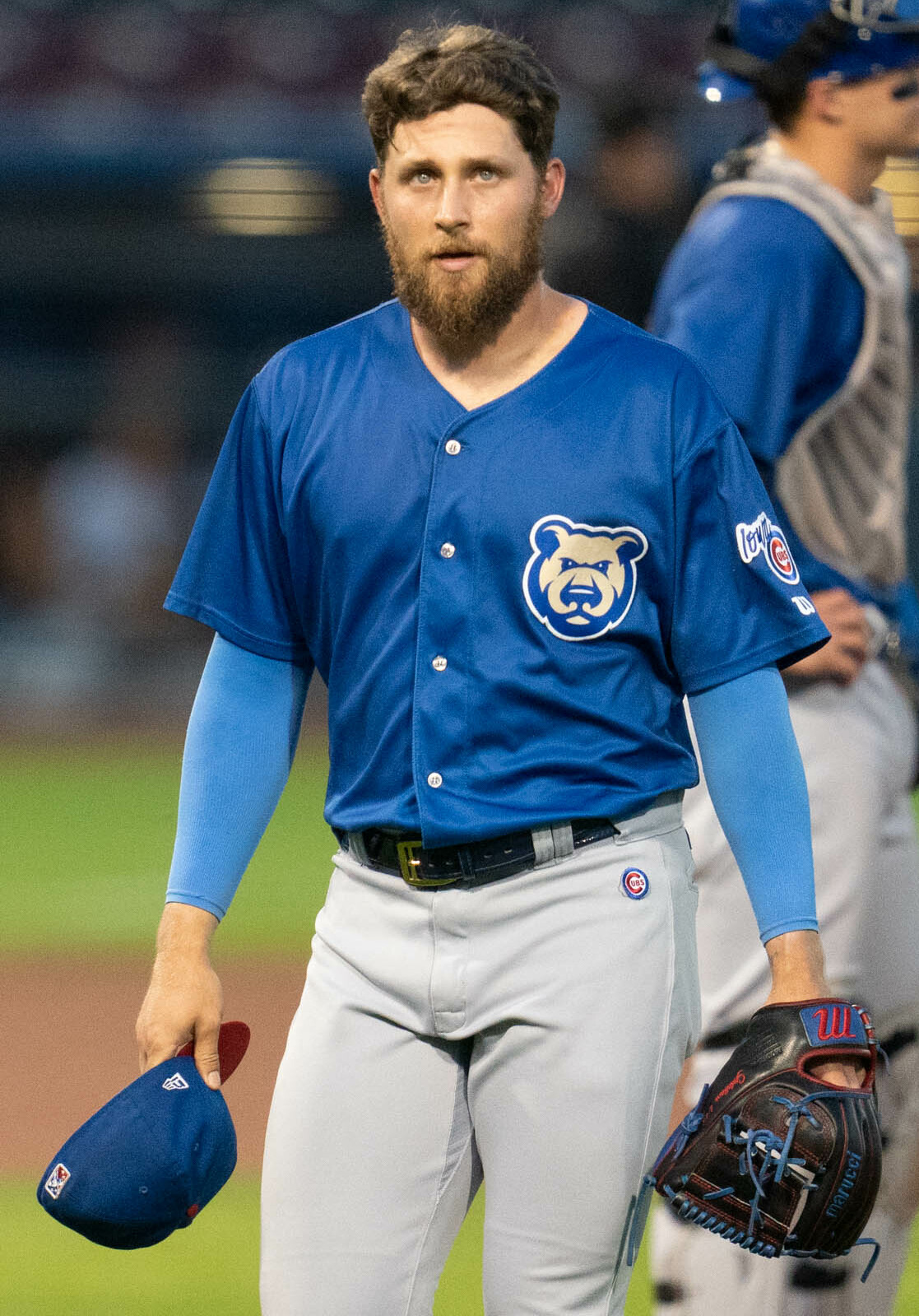
- Neidert with the Iowa Cubs in 2023
- Pitcher
- Born: November 20, 1996 (age 29); Atlanta, Georgia, U.S.
- Batted: Right Threw: Right

MLB debut
- July 25, 2020, for the Miami Marlins

Last MLB appearance
- July 30, 2022, for the Miami Marlins

MLB statistics
- Win–loss record: 1–3
- Earned run average: 4.59
- Strikeouts: 28
- Stats at Baseball Reference

Teams
- Miami Marlins (2020–2022)

Nicholas William Neidert (/ˈnaɪdərt/ NYE-dert; born November 20, 1996) is an American former professional baseball pitcher. He has previously played in Major League Baseball (MLB) for the Miami Marlins.

== Career ==
Neidert attended Peachtree Ridge High School in Suwanee, Georgia. He committed to play college baseball at the University of South Carolina. He was drafted by the Seattle Mariners in the second round of the 2015 Major League Baseball draft.

=== Seattle Mariners ===
He signed with the Mariners and made his professional debut with the Arizona League Mariners where he pitched to a 0–2 record and 1.53 ERA in 11 starts.

Neidert pitched in 2016 for the Clinton LumberKings, posting a 7–3 record with a 2.57 ERA in 19 starts. He spent 2017 with both the Modesto Nuts, with whom he was named a California League All-Star, and the Arkansas Travelers, going a combined 11–6 with a 3.45 ERA in 25 starts between both teams. He missed the final month of the season due to injury.

=== Miami Marlins ===
Neidert was traded to the Miami Marlins, along with Christopher Torres and Robert Dugger, for Dee Gordon and international slot money on December 7, 2017. He spent 2018 with the Jacksonville Jumbo Shrimp, going 12–7 with a 3.24 ERA over 26 starts, earning Southern League All-Star honors. He split the 2019 season between the GCL Marlins, Jupiter Hammerheads, and the New Orleans Baby Cakes, going a combined 3–5 with a 4.67 ERA and 46 strikeouts over 54 innings. He was placed on the injured list with knee tendinitis in April and missed three months after undergoing surgery to repair a meniscus tear. Neidert played for the Salt River Rafters of the Arizona Fall League following the 2019 season, and was named a Fall League All-Star.

Neidert was added to the Marlins 40–man roster following the 2019 season on November 20, 2019. On July 25, 2020, Neidert made his major league debut against the Philadelphia Phillies pitching 2 1/3 scoreless innings. He made 4 appearances for the big league club in 2020, posting a 5.40 ERA with 4 strikeouts. In 2021, Neidert made 8 appearances for the Marlins, tossing 35.2 innings of 4.54 ERA ball with 21 strikeouts. He spent the majority of the year with the Triple-A Jacksonville Jumbo Shrimp, logging a 6-4 record and 3.67 ERA with 52 strikeouts in 68.2 innings pitched.

On April 3, 2022, Neidert was designated for assignment by Miami to create roster space for Tanner Scott and Cole Sulser, who were acquired from the Baltimore Orioles. He cleared waivers and was outrighted to the Triple-A Jacksonville Jumbo Shrimp on April 8. He had his contract selected back to the major league roster on July 30. He only made 1 start for Miami in 2022, allowing 2 runs on 5 hits with 3 strikeouts in 5.0 innings pitched against the New York Mets. On September 6, it was announced that Neidert had undergone knee surgery, and missed the remainder of the season. On November 15, Neidert was designated for assignment. On November 18, he was non tendered and became a free agent.

=== Chicago Cubs ===
On December 24, 2022, Neidert signed a minor league deal with the Chicago Cubs. He made 27 appearances (24 starts) for the Triple–A Iowa Cubs, compiling a 5–7 record and 5.64 ERA with 86 strikeouts across 107 innings pitched. Neidert elected free agency following the season on November 6, 2023.
