= 2021 Philadelphia Phillies season =

2021 Philadelphia Phillies
- League: National League
- Division: East
- Ballpark: Citizens Bank Park
- City: Philadelphia
- Record: 82–80 (.506)
- Divisional place: 2nd
- Owners: John Middleton
- President of baseball operations: Dave Dombrowski
- Managers: Joe Girardi
- Television: NBC Sports Philadelphia; NBC Sports Philadelphia + NBC Philadelphia (Tom McCarthy, John Kruk, Ben Davis, Mike Schmidt, Jimmy Rollins, Ruben Amaro Jr)
- Radio: Phillies Radio Network; WIP SportsRadio 94.1 FM (English) (Scott Franzke, Larry Andersen, Kevin Frandsen); WTTM (Spanish) (Danny Martinez, Bill Kulik, Rickie Ricardo)
- Stats: ESPN.com; Baseball Reference

The 2021 Philadelphia Phillies season was the 139th season in the history of the franchise, and its 18th season at Citizens Bank Park. With a 5–3 loss to the Atlanta Braves on September 30, they were mathematically eliminated from postseason contention for the tenth straight season. This was the first season since exactly a decade earlier in 2011 when the Phillies would finish a season with a winning record, which they clinched with a 5–0 victory over the Miami Marlins on October 1. As of 2026, this is the most recent season that the Phillies have failed to qualify for the postseason.

== Preceding offseason ==
=== Player transactions ===
==== Players becoming free agents ====
- Right-hand pitcher Jake Arrieta – Signed with the Chicago Cubs on February 13, 2021.
- Right-hand pitcher Brandon Workman – Signed with the Chicago Cubs on February 18, 2021.
- Left-hand pitcher José Álvarez – Signed with the San Francisco Giants on March 6, 2021.
- Right-hand pitcher Tommy Hunter – Signed a minor-league contract with the New York Mets on February 14, 2021.
- Outfielder and first baseman Jay Bruce – Signed a minor-league contract with the New York Yankees on February 13, 2021.
- Shortstop Didi Gregorius – Re-signed with the Phillies on February 10, 2021.
- Catcher J. T. Realmuto – Re-signed with the Phillies on January 29, 2021.

==== Acquisitions ====
The Phillies' first offseason acquisition was right-hand pitcher Ian Hamilton, who was claimed off waivers from the Seattle Mariners on December 7. Three days later, on December 10, the team selected New York Yankees shortstop Kyle Holder in the Rule 5 draft.

=== Coaching changes ===
Pitching coach Bryan Price retired in October 2020, one season into a three-year deal. The Phillies hired former Cincinnati Reds assistant pitching coach Caleb Cotham in his stead; the hire was formally announced on November 20, 2020. The Phillies finalized their pitching staff on January 11, 2021, with two additional changes: assistant pitching coach Dave Lundquist became the bullpen coach, leaving his old position vacant, and former advanced scouting manager Mike Calitri became the quality assurance coach.

=== Return to in-person attendance ===
Due to the COVID-19 pandemic, no fans were in attendance at any MLB games in 2020 until the National League Championship Series. On November 12, 2020, Commissioner of Baseball Rob Manfred said that the MLB would be "more aggressive" about having fans in ballparks, but that in-person attendance was still dependent on local public health authorities. On March 2, the City of Philadelphia announced that, beginning on Opening Day, Citizens Bank Park would be allowed to host fans at 20% capacity (8,800 attendees). Citizens Bank Park implemented a new set of rules for all game attendees, including a face mask requirement, a ban on backpacks and purses, and the use of cashless payments at concession stands and team stores. Additionally, attendees were to be seated in "pods" of between two and six seats, evenly dispersed across the ballpark. All other seats were cordoned off to enforce social distancing.

As COVID-19 restrictions in the city of Philadelphia began to abate, the Phillies announced on May 13 that the capacity limits at Citizens Bank Park would increase from 11,000 to 16,000 on May 21, and that the park would open to full capacity on June 12. After the Philadelphia Department of Public Health announced that most COVID-19 restrictions would be lifted on June 2, the Phillies amended their earlier statement, and began allowing 100% capacity beginning on June 4. Additionally, tailgating in the parking lot was allowed to commence on June 4, and attendees were no longer required to wear face coverings in outdoor areas of the park.

== Regular season ==
=== National League East ===
NL East
Team	W	L	Pct.	GB	Home	Road
Atlanta Braves	88	73	.547	—	42‍–‍38	46‍–‍35
Philadelphia Phillies	82	80	.506	6½	47‍–‍34	35‍–‍46
New York Mets	77	85	.475	11½	47‍–‍34	30‍–‍51
Miami Marlins	67	95	.414	21½	42‍–‍39	25‍–‍56
Washington Nationals	65	97	.401	23½	35‍–‍46	30‍–‍51

=== National League Wild Card ===
Division leaders
Team	W	L	Pct.
San Francisco Giants	107	55	.660
Milwaukee Brewers	95	67	.586
Atlanta Braves	88	73	.547

Wild Card teams (Top 2 teams qualify for postseason)
Team	W	L	Pct.	GB
Los Angeles Dodgers	106	56	.654	+16
St. Louis Cardinals	90	72	.556	—
Cincinnati Reds	83	79	.512	7
Philadelphia Phillies	82	80	.506	8
San Diego Padres	79	83	.488	11
New York Mets	77	85	.475	13
Colorado Rockies	74	87	.460	15½
Chicago Cubs	71	91	.438	19
Miami Marlins	67	95	.414	23
Washington Nationals	65	97	.401	25
Pittsburgh Pirates	61	101	.377	29
Arizona Diamondbacks	52	110	.321	38

=== Record vs. opponents ===
2021 National League record Source: MLB Standings Grid – 2021
Team	AZ	ATL	CHC	CIN	COL	LAD	MIA	MIL	NYM	PHI	PIT	SD	SF	STL	WSH	AL
Arizona	—	3–4	2–4	5–1	9–10	3–16	2–5	1–6	1–5	4–3	4–2	8–11	2–17	1–6	3–4	4–16
Atlanta	4–3	—	5–2	4–3	2–4	2–4	11–8	3–3	10–9	10–9	4–3	4–2	3–3	6–1	14–5	6–14
Chicago	4–2	2–5	—	8–11	3–3	4–3	1–5	4–15	4–3	2–5	14–5	5–1	1–6	9–10	4–3	6–14
Cincinnati	1–5	3–4	11–8	—	5–2	3–3	5–2	9–10	3–3	4–2	13–6	1–6	1–6	10–9	5–2	9–11
Colorado	10–9	4–2	3–3	2–5	—	6–13	4–2	2–5	2–5	5–2	4–2	11–8	4–15	3–4	4–2	10–10
Los Angeles	16–3	4–2	3–4	3–3	13–6	—	3–4	4–3	6–1	4–2	6–0	12–7	9–10	4–3	7–0	12–8
Miami	5–2	8–11	5–1	2–5	2–4	4–3	—	3–3	9–10	10–9	2–5	3–4	3–4	0–6	8–11	3–17
Milwaukee	6–1	3–3	15–4	10–9	5–2	3–4	3–3	—	4–2	2–5	14–5	5–2	4–3	8–11	5–1	8–12
New York	5–1	9–10	3–4	3–3	5–2	1–6	10–9	2–4	—	9–10	3–4	4–3	1–5	2–5	11–8	9–11
Philadelphia	3–4	9–10	5–2	2–4	2–5	2–4	9–10	5–2	10–9	—	4–3	4–2	2–4	4–3	13–6	8–12
Pittsburgh	2–4	3–4	5–14	6–13	2–4	0–6	5–2	5–14	4–3	3–4	—	3–4	4–3	7–12	2–4	10–10
San Diego	11–8	2–4	1–5	6–1	8–11	7–12	4–3	2–5	3–4	2–4	4–3	—	8–11	3–3	4–3	14–6
San Francisco	17–2	3–3	6–1	6–1	15–4	10–9	4–3	3–4	5–1	4–2	3–4	11–8	—	2–4	5–2	13–7
St. Louis	6–1	1–6	10–9	9–10	4–3	3–4	6–0	11–8	5–2	3–4	12–7	3–3	4–2	—	2–4	11–9
Washington	4–3	5–14	3–4	2–5	2–4	0–7	11–8	1–5	8–11	6–13	4–2	3–4	2–5	4–2	—	10–10

=== Game log ===
Legend
	Phillies win
	Phillies loss
	Postponement
	Eliminated from playoff race
**Bold**	Phillies team member

2021 Game Log: 82–80 (Home: 47–34; Away: 35–46)
April: 13–13 (Home: 9–4; Away: 4–9)

#	Date	Opponent	Score	Win	Loss	Save	Attendance	Record
1	April 1	Braves	3–2 (10)	**Connor Brogdon** (1–0)	Nate Jones (0–1)	—	8,529	1–0
2	April 3	Braves	4–0	**Zack Wheeler** (1–0)	Charlie Morton (0–1)	—	8,582	2–0
3	April 4	Braves	2–1	**José Alvarado** (1–0)	Chris Martin (0–1)	**Héctor Neris** (1)	10,773	3–0
4	April 5	Mets	5–3	**Connor Brogdon** (2–0)	Trevor May (0–1)	**José Alvarado** (1)	10,782	4–0
5	April 6	Mets	4–8	Marcus Stroman (1–0)	**Chase Anderson** (0–1)	—	10,752	4–1
6	April 7	Mets	8–2	**Connor Brogdon** (3–0)	David Peterson (0–1)	—	10,807	5–1
7	April 9	@ Braves	1–8	Charlie Morton (1–1)	**Zack Wheeler** (1–1)	—	14,342	5–2
8	April 10	@ Braves	4–5	Sean Newcomb (1–0)	**Archie Bradley** (0–1)	Will Smith (2)	14,394	5–3
9	April 11	@ Braves	7–6	**José Alvarado** (2–0)	Will Smith (0–2)	**Héctor Neris** (2)	14,221	6–3
–	April 12	@ Mets	Postponed (rain); Makeup: April 13 as a straight doubleheader					
10	April 13 (1)	@ Mets	3–4 (8)	Trevor May (1–1)	**Héctor Neris** (0–1)	—	see 2nd game	6–4
11	April 13 (2)	@ Mets	0–4 (7)	Marcus Stroman (2–0)	**Aaron Nola** (0–1)	—	7,611	6–5
12	April 14	@ Mets	1–5	David Peterson (1–1)	**Zack Wheeler** (1–2)	—	7,520	6–6
–	April 15	@ Mets	Postponed (rain); Makeup: June 25 as a straight doubleheader					
13	April 16	Cardinals	9–2	**Zach Eflin** (1–0)	Carlos Martínez (0–3)	—	10,842	7–6
14	April 17	Cardinals	4–9	Ryan Helsley (2–0)	**Matt Moore** (0–1)	—	10,890	7–7
15	April 18	Cardinals	2–0	**Aaron Nola** (1–1)	John Gant (0–2)	—	10,876	8–7
16	April 19	Giants	0–2	Kevin Gausman (1–0)	**Chase Anderson** (0–2)	Wandy Peralta (2)	9,510	8–8
17	April 20	Giants	7–10	José Álvarez (1–1)	**Connor Brogdon** (3–1)	—	10,584	8–9
18	April 21	Giants	6–5	**Héctor Neris** (1–1)	Wandy Peralta (2–1)	—	9,537	9–9
19	April 23	@ Rockies	4–5	Mychal Givens (1–1)	**Héctor Neris** (1–2)	—	14,025	9–10
20	April 24	@ Rockies	7–5	**Aaron Nola** (2–1)	Jhoulys Chacín (0–1)	**Héctor Neris** (3)	20,214	10–10
21	April 25	@ Rockies	2–12	Jon Gray (3–1)	**Chase Anderson** (0–3)	—	20,244	10–11
22	April 26	@ Cardinals	2–1	**Zack Wheeler** (2–2)	Adam Wainwright (0–3)	**Héctor Neris** (4)	12,866	11–11
23	April 27	@ Cardinals	2–5	Carlos Martínez (1–4)	**Zach Eflin** (1–1)	Alex Reyes (6)	12,895	11–12
24	April 28	@ Cardinals	5–3	**Brandon Kintzler** (1–0)	Génesis Cabrera (0–1)	**Héctor Neris** (5)	12,701	12–12
25	April 29	@ Cardinals	3–4 (10)	Alex Reyes (1–0)	**David Hale** (0–1)	—	13,159	12–13
26	April 30	Mets	2–1	**Chase Anderson** (1–3)	Marcus Stroman (3–2)	**Sam Coonrod** (1)	10,914	13–13

May: 12–16 (Home: 6–6; Away: 6–10)

#	Date	Opponent	Score	Win	Loss	Save	Attendance	Record
27	May 1	Mets	4–5	Trevor May (2–1)	**Héctor Neris** (1–3)	Edwin Díaz (3)	10,948	13–14
28	May 2	Mets	7–8	Jacob Barnes (1–0)	**Brandon Kintzler** (1–1)	Jeurys Familia (1)	10,964	13–15
29	May 3	Brewers	4–3	**Vince Velasquez** (1–0)	Adrian Houser (2–3)	**Héctor Neris** (6)	10,651	14–15
30	May 4	Brewers	6–5	**Aaron Nola** (3–1)	Eric Lauer (1–1)	**Sam Coonrod** (2)	10,388	15–15
31	May 5	Brewers	5–4	**Brandon Kintzler** (2–1)	Freddy Peralta (3–1)	**José Alvarado** (2)	10,110	16–15
32	May 6	Brewers	2–0	**Zack Wheeler** (3–2)	Brandon Woodruff (2–1)	—	10,768	17–15
33	May 7	@ Braves	12–2	**Zach Eflin** (2–1)	Charlie Morton (2–2)	—	38,952	18–15
34	May 8	@ Braves	7–8 (12)	Jacob Webb (1–1)	**Enyel De Los Santos** (0–1)	—	39,852	18–16
35	May 9	@ Braves	1–6	Huascar Ynoa (4–1)	**Aaron Nola** (3–2)	—	28,829	18–17
36	May 11	@ Nationals	6–2	**Chase Anderson** (2–3)	Erick Fedde (2–4)	—	8,559	19–17
37	May 12	@ Nationals	5–2 (10)	**José Alvarado** (3–0)	Brad Hand (2–2)	**Héctor Neris** (7)	8,610	20–17
38	May 13	@ Nationals	1–5	Patrick Corbin (2–3)	**Zach Eflin** (2–2)	—	8,710	20–18
39	May 14	@ Blue Jays (Note: at TD Ballpark, Dunedin, FL, due to the ongoing COVID-19 pandemic restrictions)	5–1	**Connor Brogdon** (4–1)	Trent Thornton (1–1)	—	1,171	21–18
40	May 15	@ Blue Jays	0–4	Travis Bergen (2–0)	**Aaron Nola** (3–3)	—	1,397	21–19
41	May 16	@ Blue Jays	8–10	Robbie Ray (2–1)	**Chase Anderson** (2–4)	—	1,107	21–20
42	May 18	Marlins	8–3	**Archie Bradley** (1–1)	Dylan Floro (2–2)	—	11,114	22–20
43	May 19	Marlins	1–3	Trevor Rogers (6–2)	**Zach Eflin** (2–3)	Yimi García (8)	11,549	22–21
44	May 20	Marlins	0–6	Sandy Alcántara (2–3)	**David Hale** (0–2)	—	11,503	22–22
45	May 21	Red Sox	3–11	Martín Pérez (2–2)	**Aaron Nola** (3–4)	—	15,279	22–23
46	May 22	Red Sox	3–4	Nathan Eovaldi (5–2)	**Spencer Howard** (0–1)	Matt Barnes (11)	15,424	22–24
47	May 23	Red Sox	6–2	**Zack Wheeler** (4–2)	Eduardo Rodríguez (5–3)	—	15,360	23–24
48	May 24	@ Marlins	6–9	Adam Cimber (1–1)	**Zach Eflin** (2–4)	Dylan Floro (1)	4,527	23–25
49	May 25	@ Marlins	2–0	**Vince Velasquez** (2–0)	Sandy Alcántara (2–4)	**Héctor Neris** (8)	4,864	24–25
50	May 26	@ Marlins	2–4	Ross Detwiler (1–0)	**Sam Coonrod** (0–1)	Yimi García (9)	4,760	24–26
51	May 27	@ Marlins	3–2	**José Alvarado** (4–0)	Yimi García (3–3)	**Héctor Neris** (9)	4,932	25–26
52	May 29	@ Rays	3–5	Diego Castillo (2–2)	**Sam Coonrod** (0–2)	J. P. Feyereisen (2)	7,316	25–27
53	May 30	@ Rays	2–6	Josh Fleming (5–3)	**Zach Eflin** (2–5)	—	7,479	25–28
54	May 31	@ Reds	1–11	Wade Miley (5–4)	**Vince Velasquez** (2–1)	—	17,878	25–29

June: 12–12 (Home: 7–5; Away: 5–7)

#	Date	Opponent	Score	Win	Loss	Save	Attendance	Record
55	June 1	@ Reds	17–3	**Aaron Nola** (4–4)	Sonny Gray (1–4)	—	10,788	26–29
–	June 2	@ Reds	Postponed (rain); Makeup: June 28					
56	June 4	Nationals	1–2	Max Scherzer (5–4)	**Zack Wheeler** (4–3)	Brad Hand (10)	15,030	26–30
57	June 5	Nationals	5–2	**Ranger Suárez** (1–0)	Joe Ross (2–6)	**Connor Brogdon** (1)	16,118	27–30
58	June 6	Nationals	12–6	**Sam Coonrod** (1–2)	Kyle Finnegan (2–1)	—	15,108	28–30
59	June 8	Braves	5–9	Sean Newcomb (2–0)	**Connor Brogdon** (4–2)	—	13,125	28–31
60	June 9	Braves	2–1	**Ranger Suárez** (2–0)	Will Smith (1–5)	—	13,552	29–31
61	June 10	Braves	4–3 (10)	**José Alvarado** (5–0)	Chris Martin (0–2)	—	14,261	30–31
62	June 12	Yankees	8–7 (10)	**Archie Bradley** (2–1)	Aroldis Chapman (4–2)	—	38,450	31–31
63	June 13	Yankees	7–0	**Aaron Nola** (5–4)	Domingo Germán (4–4)	—	38,512	32–31
64	June 14	@ Dodgers	1–3	David Price (2–0)	**Spencer Howard** (0–2)	Kenley Jansen (16)	15,761	32–32
65	June 15	@ Dodgers	3–5	Joe Kelly (2–0)	**Ranger Suárez** (2–1)	Blake Treinen (3)	52,078	32–33
66	June 16	@ Dodgers	2–0	**Zack Wheeler** (5–3)	Clayton Kershaw (8–6)	**Héctor Neris** (10)	52,157	33–33
67	June 18	@ Giants	3–5	Johnny Cueto (5–3)	**Vince Velasquez** (2–2)	Jake McGee (14)	16,170	33–34
68	June 19	@ Giants	13–6	**Ranger Suárez** (3–1)	Jarlin García (0–2)	—	16,774	34–34
69	June 20	@ Giants	2–11	Sam Long (1–0)	**Zach Eflin** (2–6)	—	18,265	34–35
70	June 22	Nationals	2–3	Max Scherzer (6–4)	**Zack Wheeler** (5–4)	Brad Hand (16)	19,652	34–36
71	June 23	Nationals	12–13	Tanner Rainey (1–2)	**Héctor Neris** (1–4)	Paolo Espino (1)	17,892	34–37
72	June 25 (1)	@ Mets	1–2 (8)	Seth Lugo (1–0)	**Ranger Suárez** (3–2)	—	see 2nd game	34–38
73	June 25 (2)	@ Mets	2–1 (8)	**Archie Bradley** (3–1)	Sean Reid-Foley (2–1)	**Héctor Neris** (11)	29,012	35–38
74	June 26	@ Mets	3–4	Edwin Díaz (2–2)	**Héctor Neris** (1–5)	—	29,205	35–39
75	June 27	@ Mets	4–2	**Zack Wheeler** (6–4)	Marcus Stroman (6–6)	**Archie Bradley** (1)	25,488	36–39
76	June 28	@ Reds	4–12	Heath Hembree (2–3)	**Neftalí Feliz** (0–1)	—	21,006	36–40
77	June 29	Marlins	4–3	**Vince Velasquez** (3–2)	Trevor Rogers (7–5)	**José Alvarado** (3)	18,079	37–40
78	June 30	Marlins	6–11	Zach Pop (1–0)	**Aaron Nola** (5–5)	—	17,190	37–41

July: 14–12 (Home: 9–6; Away: 5–6)

#	Date	Opponent	Score	Win	Loss	Save	Attendance	Record
–	July 1	Marlins	Postponed (rain); Makeup: July 16 as a straight doubleheader					
79	July 2	Padres	4–3 (10)	**Ranger Suárez** (4–2)	Austin Adams (2–2)	—	22,653	38–41
80	July 3	Padres	4–2	**Zach Eflin** (3–6)	Yu Darvish (7–3)	**Ranger Suárez** (1)	25,053	39–41
81	July 4	Padres	1–11	Austin Adams (3–2)	**Vince Velasquez** (3–3)	—	25,592	39–42
82	July 5	@ Cubs	13–3	**Connor Brogdon** (5–2)	Rex Brothers (2–2)	—	37,165	40–42
83	July 6	@ Cubs	15–10	**Aaron Nola** (6–5)	Jake Arrieta (5–9)	—	30,095	41–42
84	July 7	@ Cubs	3–8	Alec Mills (4–2)	**Zack Wheeler** (6–5)	—	28,860	41–43
85	July 8	@ Cubs	8–0	**Zach Eflin** (4–6)	Adbert Alzolay (4–9)	—	30,727	42–43
86	July 9	@ Red Sox	5–11	Garrett Richards (5–5)	**Vince Velasquez** (3–4)	—	32,641	42–44
87	July 10	@ Red Sox	11–2	**Bailey Falter** (1–0)	Martín Pérez (7–5)	—	33,202	43–44
88	July 11	@ Red Sox	5–4	**Cristopher Sánchez** (1–0)	Nick Pivetta (7–4)	**Ranger Suárez** (2)	32,586	44–44
–	July 13	**2021 Major League Baseball All-Star Game at Coors Field in Denver**						
89	July 16 (1)	Marlins	5–2 (7)	**Archie Bradley** (4–1)	Sandy Alcántara (5–9)	**Ranger Suárez** (3)	see 2nd game	45–44
90	July 16 (2)	Marlins	0–7 (7)	Jordan Holloway (2–2)	**Zach Eflin** (4–7)	—	28,712	45–45
91	July 17	Marlins	4–2 (10) (Note: The July 17 game was suspended due to rain in the top of the tenth inning with the game tied 2–2; it was completed before the regularly scheduled game on July 18.)	**José Alvarado** (6–0)	Yimi García (3–7)	—	21,390	46–45
92	July 18	Marlins	7–4	**Zack Wheeler** (7–5)	Anthony Bender (1–1)	**Héctor Neris** (12)	20,588	47–45
93	July 20	@ Yankees	4–6	Luis Cessa (3–1)	**Aaron Nola** (6–6)	Aroldis Chapman (17)	36,106	47–46
94	July 21	@ Yankees	5–6 (10)	Brooks Kriske (1–0)	**Ranger Suárez** (4–3)	—	34,112	47–47
95	July 22	Braves	2–7	Charlie Morton (9–3)	**Matt Moore** (0–2)	—	22,645	47–48
96	July 23	Braves	5–1	**Zack Wheeler** (8–5)	Max Fried (7–6)	—	23,546	48–48
97	July 24	Braves	3–15	Josh Tomlin (4–0)	**Vince Velasquez** (3–5)	—	24,479	48–49
98	July 25	Braves	2–1	**Aaron Nola** (7–6)	Touki Toussaint (1–1)	**Ranger Suárez** (4)	19,370	49–49
99	July 26	Nationals	6–5	**Archie Bradley** (5–1)	Brad Hand (5–5)	—	23,265	50–49
100	July 27	Nationals	4–6	Wander Suero (2–2)	**Matt Moore** (0–3)	Brad Hand (21)	20,135	50–50
—	July 28	Nationals	Postponed (COVID-19 contact tracing); Makeup: July 29 as a straight doubleheader					
101	July 29 (1)	Nationals	1–3 (7)	Max Scherzer (8–4)	**Zack Wheeler** (8–6)	Kyle Finnegan (1)	see 2nd game	50–51
102	July 29 (2)	Nationals	11–8 (8)	**Ranger Suárez** (5–3)	Sam Clay (0–4)	—	19,219	51–51
103	July 30	@ Pirates	0–7	Wil Crowe (3–5)	**Vince Velasquez** (3–6)	—	20,591	51–52
104	July 31	@ Pirates	2–3	Chris Stratton (4–0)	**José Alvarado** (6–1)	—	32,071	51–53

August: 17–11 (Home: 8–7; Away: 9–4)

#	Date	Opponent	Score	Win	Loss	Save	Attendance	Record
105	August 1	@ Pirates	15–4	**Kyle Gibson** (7–3)	Mitch Keller (3–8)	—	17,875	52–53
106	August 2	@ Nationals	7–5	**Archie Bradley** (6–1)	Gabe Klobosits (0–1)	—	16,393	53–53
107	August 3	@ Nationals	5–4	**Zack Wheeler** (9–6)	Patrick Corbin (6–10)	**José Alvarado** (4)	17,417	54–53
108	August 4	@ Nationals	9–5	**Matt Moore** (1–3)	Paolo Espino (3–3)	—	18,482	55–53
109	August 5	@ Nationals	7–6	**Mauricio Llovera** (1–0)	Kyle Finnegan (4–3)	**Archie Bradley** (2)	22,575	56–53
110	August 6	Mets	4–2	**Kyle Gibson** (8–3)	Marcus Stroman (7–11)	**Ian Kennedy** (17)	30,106	57–53
111	August 7	Mets	5–3	**JD Hammer** (1–0)	Tylor Megill (1–2)	**Ian Kennedy** (18)	37,057	58–53
112	August 8	Mets	3–0	**Zack Wheeler** (10–6)	Taijuan Walker (7–7)	—	39,186	59–53
113	August 10	Dodgers	0–5	Alex Vesia (2–1)	**JD Hammer** (1–1)	—	28,333	59–54
114	August 11	Dodgers	2–8	Brusdar Graterol (3–0)	**Kyle Gibson** (8–4)	—	32,186	59–55
115	August 12	Dodgers	2–1	**Archie Bradley** (7–1)	Mitch White (0–1)	**Ian Kennedy** (19)	26,122	60–55
116	August 13	Reds	1–6	Tyler Mahle (10–3)	**Zack Wheeler** (10–7)	—	26,074	60–56
117	August 14	Reds	6–1	**Matt Moore** (2–3)	Luis Castillo (6–12)	—	25,100	61–56
118	August 15	Reds	4–7	Lucas Sims (5–2)	**Aaron Nola** (7–7)	Mychal Givens (3)	28,544	61–57
119	August 17	@ Diamondbacks	2–3	Miguel Aguilar (1–1)	**Kyle Gibson** (8–5)	Tyler Clippard (3)	7,796	61–58
120	August 18	@ Diamondbacks	2–4	Humberto Castellanos (1–1)	**Ranger Suárez** (5–4)	Tyler Clippard (4)	7,968	61–59
121	August 19	@ Diamondbacks	2–6	Madison Bumgarner (7–7)	**Zack Wheeler** (10–8)	—	7,165	61–60
122	August 20	@ Padres	4–3	**Héctor Neris** (2–5)	Blake Snell (6–5)	**Ian Kennedy** (20)	40,927	62–60
123	August 21	@ Padres	3–4 (10)	Mark Melancon (3–2)	**Connor Brogdon** (5–3)	—	43,383	62–61
124	August 22	@ Padres	7–4	**Kyle Gibson** (9–5)	Ryan Weathers (4–6)	—	38,548	63–61
125	August 24	Rays	1–3	J. T. Chargois (3–0)	**Archie Bradley** (7–2)	Andrew Kittredge (3)	23,402	63–62
126	August 25	Rays	4–7	Collin McHugh (5–1)	**Zack Wheeler** (10–9)	—	25,552	63–63
127	August 26	Diamondbacks	7–8	Zac Gallen (2–7)	**Matt Moore** (2–4)	Noé Ramirez (1)	20,148	63–64
128	August 27	Diamondbacks	7–6 (11)	**Enyel De Los Santos** (1–1)	Taylor Clarke (1–1)	—	23,181	64–64
129	August 28	Diamondbacks	7–0	**Kyle Gibson** (10–5)	Humberto Mejía (0–1)	—	24,692	65–64
130	August 29	Diamondbacks	7–4	**Ranger Suárez** (6–4)	Madison Bumgarner (7–9)	**Ian Kennedy** (21)	22,237	66–64
131	August 30	@ Nationals	7–4	**Zack Wheeler** (11–9)	Josiah Gray (0–2)	**José Alvarado** (5)	17,353	67–64
132	August 31	@ Nationals	12–6	**Bailey Falter** (2–0)	Patrick Corbin (7–14)	—	16,844	68–64

September: 13–14 (Home: 8–6; Away: 5–8)

#	Date	Opponent	Score	Win	Loss	Save	Attendance	Record
–	September 1	@ Nationals	Postponed (rain; remnants of Tropical Storm Ida); Makeup: September 2					
133	September 2	@ Nationals	7–6	**Sam Coonrod** (2–2)	Andrés Machado (1–1)	**Ian Kennedy** (22)	12,280	69–64
134	September 3	@ Marlins	3–10	Steven Okert (1–1)	**Kyle Gibson** (10–6)	—	7,073	69–65
135	September 4	@ Marlins	2–3	Anthony Bass (2–7)	**Archie Bradley** (7–3)	Dylan Floro (8)	9,256	69–66
136	September 5	@ Marlins	4–3 (10)	**Ian Kennedy** (1–0)	Dylan Floro (5–6)	—	8,082	70–66
137	September 6	@ Brewers	12–0	**Zack Wheeler** (12–9)	Brandon Woodruff (9–8)	—	30,192	71–66
138	September 7	@ Brewers	0–10	Eric Lauer (5–5)	**Aaron Nola** (7–8)	—	22,955	71–67
139	September 8	@ Brewers	3–4	Aaron Ashby (2–0)	**Connor Brogdon** (5–4)	—	20,654	71–68
140	September 9	Rockies	3–4	Lucas Gilbreath (1–1)	**Ian Kennedy** (1–1)	Carlos Estévez (6)	18,071	71–69
141	September 10	Rockies	2–11	Germán Márquez (12–10)	**Bailey Falter** (2–1)	—	22,138	71–70
142	September 11	Rockies	6–1	**Zack Wheeler** (13–9)	Kyle Freeland (5–8)	—	23,232	72–70
143	September 12	Rockies	4–5	Ashton Goudeau (1–0)	**Héctor Neris** (2–6)	Carlos Estévez (7)	24,099	72–71
144	September 14	Cubs	3–6	Adrian Sampson (1–2)	**Kyle Gibson** (10–7)	Rowan Wick (4)	16,170	72–72
145	September 15	Cubs	6–5	**Ian Kennedy** (2–1)	Trevor Megill (1–2)	—	16,299	73–72
146	September 16	Cubs	17–8	**Héctor Neris** (3–6)	Manuel Rodríguez (3–3)	—	20,208	74–72
147	September 17	@ Mets	4–3	**Zack Wheeler** (14–9)	Taijuan Walker (7–10)	**Ian Kennedy** (23)	26,967	75–72
148	September 18	@ Mets	5–3	**Aaron Nola** (8–8)	Carlos Carrasco (1–3)	**Ian Kennedy** (24)	33,442	76–72
149	September 19	@ Mets	2–3	Aaron Loup (6–0)	**Kyle Gibson** (10–8)	Edwin Díaz (30)	24,832	76–73
150	September 20	Orioles	0–2	John Means (6–7)	**Ranger Suárez** (6–5)	Tyler Wells (3)	21,440	76–74
151	September 21	Orioles	3–2 (10)	**Ian Kennedy** (3–1)	César Valdez (2–2)	—	18,955	77–74
152	September 22	Orioles	4–3	**José Alvarado** (7–1)	Conner Greene (1–2)	**Ian Kennedy** (25)	18,133	78–74
153	September 23	Pirates	12–6	**Aaron Nola** (9–8)	Anthony Banda (2–2)	—	16,154	79–74
154	September 24	Pirates	8–5	**Héctor Neris** (4–6)	Chasen Shreve (3–2)	**Ian Kennedy** (26)	20,548	80–74
155	September 25	Pirates	3–0	**Ranger Suárez** (7–5)	Wil Crowe (4–8)	—	28,135	81–74
156	September 26	Pirates	0–6	Max Kranick (2–3)	**Hans Crouse** (0–1)	—	29,336	81–75
157	September 28	@ Braves	1–2	Charlie Morton (14–6)	**Zack Wheeler** (14–10)	Will Smith (36)	29,238	81–76
158	September 29	@ Braves	2–7	Max Fried (14–7)	**Aaron Nola** (9–9)	—	27,664	81–77
159	September 30	@ Braves	3–5	Ian Anderson (9–5)	**Kyle Gibson** (10–9)	Will Smith (37)	38,235	81–78

October: 1–2 (Home: 0–0; Away: 1–2)

#	Date	Opponent	Score	Win	Loss	Save	Attendance	Record
160	October 1	@ Marlins	5–0	**Ranger Suárez** (8–5)	Sandy Alcántara (9–15)	—	8,469	82–78
161	October 2	@ Marlins	1–3	Jesús Luzardo (6–9)	**Hans Crouse** (0–2)	Dylan Floro (14)	9,655	82–79
162	October 3	@ Marlins	4–5	Zach Thompson (3–7)	**Héctor Neris** (4–7)	Dylan Floro (15)	9,149	82–80

== Player stats ==
=== Batting ===
Note: G = Games played; AB = At bats; R = Runs; H = Hits; 2B = Doubles; 3B = Triples; HR = Home runs; RBI = Runs batted in; SB = Stolen bases; BB = Walks; AVG = Batting average; SLG = Slugging average

Player	G	AB	R	H	2B	3B	HR	RBI	SB	BB	AVG	SLG
Jean Segura	131	514	76	149	27	3	14	58	9	39	.290	.436
Bryce Harper	141	488	101	151	42	1	35	84	13	100	.309	.615
Andrew McCutchen	144	482	78	107	24	1	27	80	6	81	.222	.444
J. T. Realmuto	134	476	64	125	25	4	17	73	13	48	.263	.439
Odúbel Herrera	124	450	59	117	27	2	13	51	6	29	.260	.416
Rhys Hoskins	107	389	64	96	29	0	27	71	3	47	.247	.530
Alec Bohm	115	380	46	94	15	0	7	47	4	31	.247	.342
Didi Gregorius	103	368	35	77	16	2	13	54	3	25	.209	.370
Brad Miller	140	331	53	75	9	3	20	49	3	45	.227	.453
Ronald Torreyes	111	318	30	77	10	1	7	41	2	19	.242	.346
Andrew Knapp	62	145	13	22	3	0	2	11	0	10	.152	.214
Travis Jankowski	76	131	24	33	6	2	1	10	5	22	.252	.351
Nick Maton	52	117	16	30	7	1	2	14	2	10	.256	.385
Freddy Galvis	32	107	17	24	3	0	5	14	0	9	.224	.393
Luke Williams	58	98	8	24	4	0	1	6	2	10	.245	.316
Matt Vierling	34	71	11	23	3	1	2	6	2	4	.324	.479
Matt Joyce	43	55	6	5	1	0	2	7	0	12	.091	.218
Roman Quinn	28	52	8	9	2	2	0	2	4	6	.173	.288
Rafael Marchan	20	52	7	12	1	1	1	4	0	4	.231	.346
Mickey Moniak	21	33	3	3	0	0	1	3	0	3	.091	.182
Adam Haseley	9	21	2	4	1	0	0	0	0	0	.190	.238
Scott Kingery	15	19	1	1	0	0	0	0	0	0	.053	.053
Jorge Bonifacio	7	11	0	1	0	0	0	2	0	1	.091	.091
Pitcher totals	162	258	12	29	7	0	1	13	0	9	.112	.151
Team totals	162	5366	734	1288	262	24	198	700	77	564	.240	.408

=== Pitching ===
Note: W = Wins; L = Losses; ERA = Earned run average; G = Games pitched; GS = Games started; SV = Saves; IP = Innings pitched; H = Hits allowed; R = Runs allowed; ER = Earned runs allowed; BB = Walks allowed; SO = Strikeouts

Player	W	L	ERA	G	GS	SV	IP	H	R	ER	BB	SO
Zack Wheeler	14	10	2.78	32	32	0	213.1	169	72	66	46	247
Aaron Nola	9	9	4.63	32	32	0	180.2	165	95	93	39	223
Ranger Suárez	8	5	1.36	39	12	4	106.0	73	20	16	33	107
Zach Eflin	4	7	4.17	18	18	0	105.2	116	52	49	16	99
Vince Velasquez	3	6	5.95	21	17	0	81.2	76	55	54	45	85
Héctor Neris	4	7	3.63	74	0	12	74.1	55	34	30	32	98
Matt Moore	2	4	6.29	24	13	0	73.0	78	54	51	38	63
Kyle Gibson	4	6	5.09	12	11	0	69.0	66	40	39	23	61
Connor Brogdon	5	4	3.43	56	1	1	57.2	47	27	22	18	50
José Alvarado	7	1	4.20	64	0	5	55.2	42	30	26	47	68
Archie Bradley	7	3	3.71	53	0	2	51.0	51	24	21	22	40
Chase Anderson	2	4	6.75	14	9	0	48.0	51	36	36	20	35
Sam Coonrod	2	2	4.04	42	2	2	42.1	41	21	19	15	48
Bailey Falter	2	1	5.61	22	1	0	33.2	34	21	21	6	34
Brandon Kintzler	2	1	6.37	29	1	0	29.2	45	23	21	8	22
Spencer Howard	0	2	5.72	11	7	0	28.1	25	19	18	17	31
Enyel De Los Santos	1	1	6.75	26	0	0	28.0	34	28	21	14	42
David Hale	0	2	6.41	17	1	0	26.2	30	20	19	9	21
Ian Kennedy	3	1	4.13	23	0	10	24.0	18	12	11	10	27
J. D. Hammer	1	1	4.95	20	0	0	20.0	21	11	11	11	22
Cristopher Sánchez	1	0	4.97	7	1	0	12.2	16	8	7	7	13
Cam Bedrosian	0	0	4.35	11	1	0	10.1	8	5	5	7	8
JoJo Romero	0	0	7.00	11	0	0	9.0	12	8	7	4	8
Ramón Rosso	0	0	5.63	7	0	0	8.0	10	6	5	3	7
Adonis Medina	0	0	3.52	4	1	0	7.2	9	3	3	4	6
Hans Crouse	0	2	5.14	2	2	0	7.0	4	4	4	7	2
Mauricio Llovera	1	0	9.45	6	0	0	6.2	10	7	7	4	7
Ronald Torreyes	0	0	13.50	2	0	0	2.2	6	4	4	0	1
David Paulino	0	0	9.00	1	0	0	2.0	3	2	2	0	0
Neftalí Feliz	0	1	36.00	2	0	0	1.0	4	4	4	1	2
Kyle Dohy	0	0	0.00	1	0	0	1.0	1	0	0	1	1
Seranthony Domínguez	0	0	0.00	1	0	0	1.0	0	0	0	0	1
Andrew Knapp	0	0	0.00	1	0	0	0.1	0	0	0	0	0
Nick Maton	0	0	0.00	1	0	0	0.1	0	0	0	0	1
Damon Jones	0	0	0.00	1	0	0	0.1	1	0	0	2	0
Team totals	82	80	4.39	162	162	36	1418.2	1321	745	692	509	1480

== Season notes ==
=== April ===
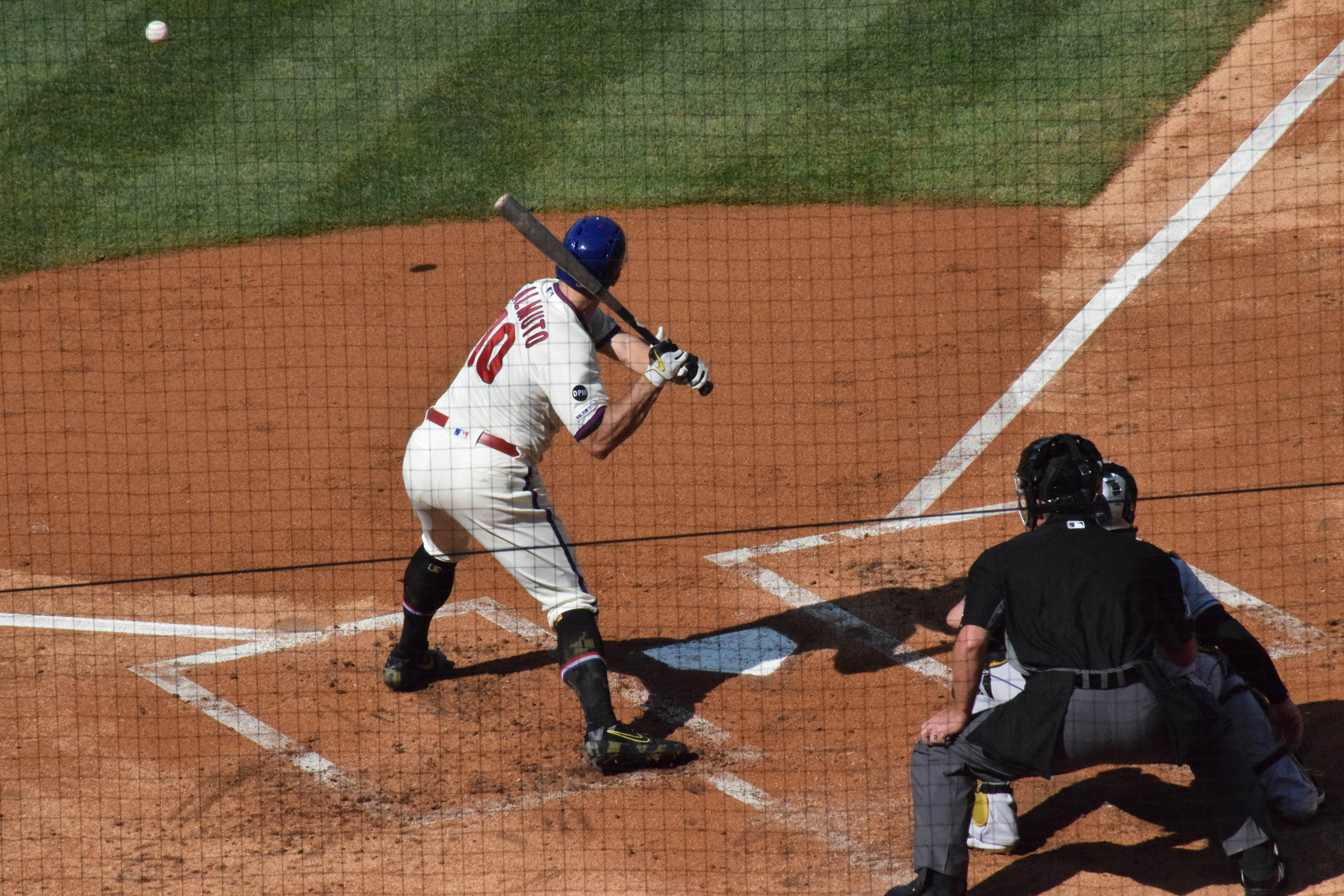
J. T. Realmuto led the team in hitting through the month of April, posting a .329 batting average over his first 25 games with two home runs and 11 runs batted in

The Phillies opened the season at home with a three-game series against the division rival Atlanta Braves. On opening day, Jean Segura hit a walk-off single in the 10th inning to help the Phillies win 3–2 to start the year. Zack Wheeler pitched seven innings, allowing one hit, no runs, and striking out 10 while adding two hits and two RBIs on offense to lead the Phillies to a 4–0 victory over the Braves in game two. The Phillies completed the series sweep on Easter Sunday, beating the Braves 2–1 backed by a strong start from Zach Eflin and their first home run of the season, coming off the bat of backup catcher Andrew Knapp. The Phillies continued their homestand with a three-game series against the New York Mets, who were playing their first series of the season after a COVID-19 outbreak led their planned opening against the Washington Nationals to be postponed. In game one of the series, the Phillies came back from a 2–0 deficit by scoring five runs in the eighth inning and then holding on to win 5–3 for their fourth consecutive win to start the season. The Phillies dropped their first game of the season on April 6, falling to the Mets 8–4, saddled by leaving seven runners on base as well as an inning in which relief pitcher Vince Velasquez walked four hitters, all of whom scored for the Mets. In the rubber match of the three-game series, the Phillies beat the Mets 8–2, powered by a pair of three-run home runs, one from Alec Bohm and the other from J. T. Realmuto.

After an off day, the Phillies' season continued with a road trip that began in Atlanta. They lost the first game of a three-game series against the Braves 8–1. The Phillies dropped the second game of the series 5–4, a game in which they relinquished a lead built in the first inning and fell behind twice after ties. After again giving up three runs in the first inning, the Phillies battled back in the series' third game, taking the lead in the top of the ninth inning on a controversial sacrifice fly in which Bohm appeared not to touch home plate but was nonetheless called safe, and holding on to win 7–6. The Phillies then traveled to New York to face the Mets in a four-game series. The first game, scheduled for April 12, was rained out and rescheduled as part of a double header to be held on April 13 in which both games would be seven innings instead of the usual nine. In the first game of that doubleheader, the Phillies fought back to tie the game and send it to extra innings, then took the lead in the top of the eighth (the extra inning), but lost in the bottom of the inning when closer Hector Neris surrendered two runs. The Phillies lost the second game of the doubleheader 4–0. After losing once again to slip to 1–5 on the road trip, Bryce Harper spoke to the press, took responsibility for his own struggles at the plate, and suggested the entire offense—except for Realmuto—needed to improve if the Phillies were going to compete in the National League East division. The last game of the series was rained out and postponed until June 25.

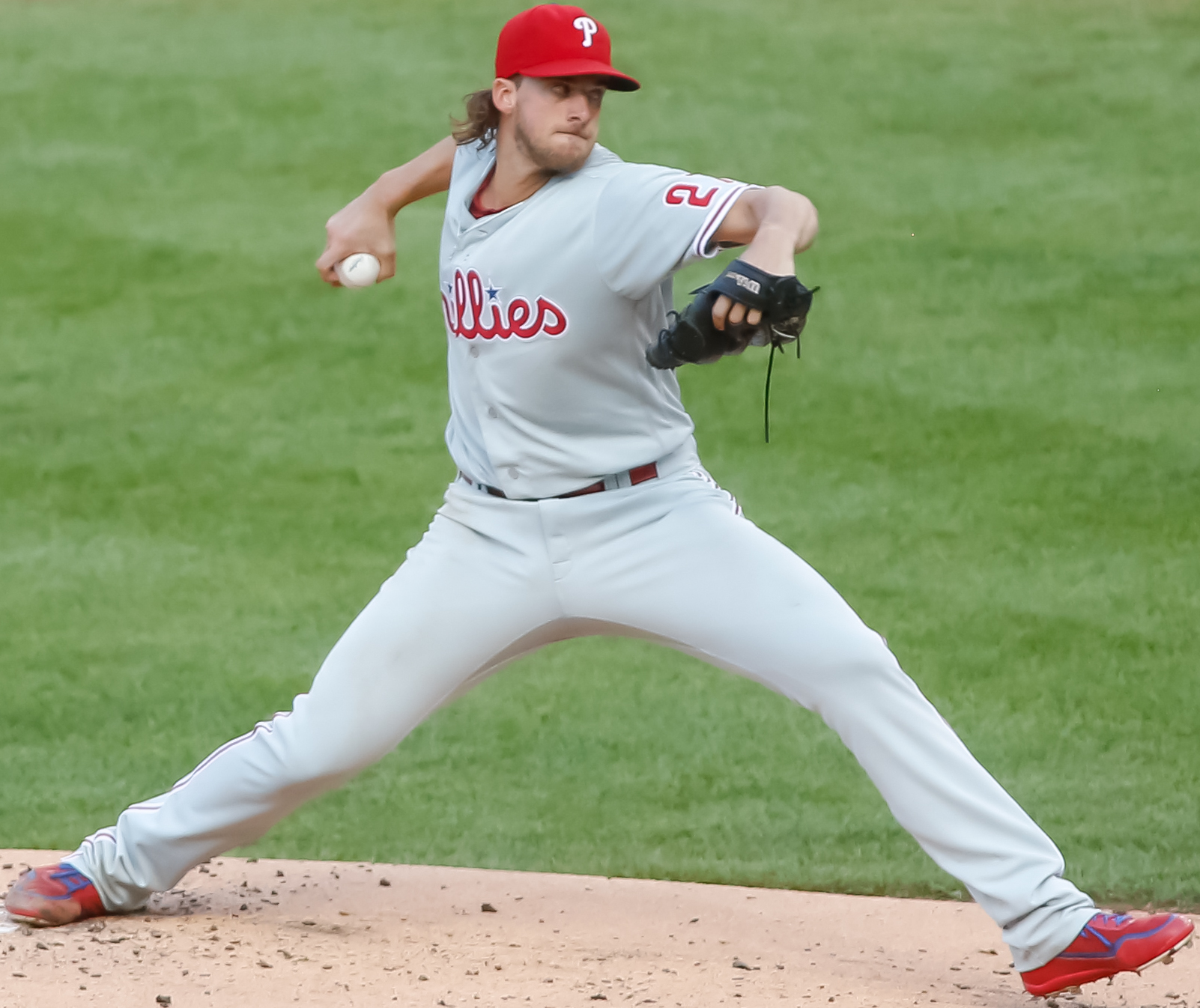
Aaron Nola threw the first nine-inning complete game shutout of his major league career on April 18, 2021 as the Phillies beat the Cardinals 2–0

The Phillies returned to Philadelphia with a 6–6 record for a six-game homestand, featuring series against the St. Louis Cardinals and San Francisco Giants, managed by former Phillies' skipper Gabe Kapler. In game one of the series against the Cardinals, the Phillies capitalized on a six-run second inning and a strong outing from Eflin, who allowed two runs in seven innings, to earn an 9–2 victory. The Cardinals responded, scoring six runs off of Matt Moore in the third inning on April 17, all with two outs, and hit a total of four home runs (including two by Yadier Molina) to power St. Louis to a 9–4 victory. The Phillies left 11 runners on base, including the bases loaded in the ninth inning, as Moore struggled for his third consecutive outing to start the season. Aaron Nola started the final game of the series and earned his first career nine-inning complete game, a shutout as the Phillies beat the Cardinals 2–0, winning the rubber match of the series and advancing above .500 for the season. On April 19, the Giants beat the Phillies 2–0 in game one of a three game series. The Phillies left 11 runners on base and were hitless in eight at-bats with runners in scoring position. The Phillies leapt out to a 4–0 lead the next day and carried a lead into the eighth inning when the Giants notched a pair of three-run home runs to come from behind and beat the Phillies 10–7, handing the Phillies their second straight loss and putting them below .500 for the first time of the season. The Phillies salvaged the final game of the series in walk-off fashion when Knapp drove in Harper on an RBI single in the ninth inning. Mickey Moniak hit his first career home run, a three-run shot in the second inning, while Nick Maton, in his second career game, posted three hits in four at-bats.

The Phillies closed the month of April on a road trip west, beginning with a three-game series against the Colorado Rockies. In game one, despite an early lead and a solid start from Vince Velasquez, the bullpen struggled for the third consecutive game, and the Rockies came back to beat the Phillies 5–4. The Phillies won the second game of the series, but collapsed in the rubber match, surrendering seven runs in the fourth inning en route to a 12–2 loss. Next, the Phillies traveled to St. Louis, Missouri, to face the Cardinals in a four-game series. Wheeler opened the series with a dominant outing, outlasting Adam Wainwright in a pitcher's duel as the Phillies hung on for a 2–1 victory. Game two went to the Cardinals, however, as the Phillies mustered only three hits in the 5–2 defeat. In the sixth inning of game three, Cardinals reliever Génesis Cabrera hit two batters on his first two pitches: Harper in the face and Didi Gregorius in the back. Harper left the game early, both benches were warned, and Joe Girardi was ejected from the game after arguing with the home plate umpire. McCutchen hit a go-ahead RBI single the next at bat, and the Phillies came back to win the game 5–3. The Phillies lost the final game of the series 4–3 on a walk-off wild pitch thrown by David Hale in the tenth inning.

The Phillies returned home on April 30 to open a series against the Mets. Despite mustering only three hits, the Phillies managed to win game one by a score of 2–1. Chase Anderson earned his first win as a Phillie and Sam Coonrod picked up his first save as a Phillie. The team's only two runs came on an uncaught third strike with the bases loaded. With the win, the Phillies moved to 13–13 on the season, closing the first month of the season at .500 and leading the National League East. As of the end of the month, the Phillies were without Segura and Archie Bradley, who were on the injured list due to a hamstring injury and oblique injury respectively, and without Gregorius, Harper, and Realmuto, who missed time due to more minor injuries sustained during the previous week of play. Ronald Torreyes and Matt Moore were both on the COVID-19 list (either for having tested positive or been exposed) and expected to return early in May.

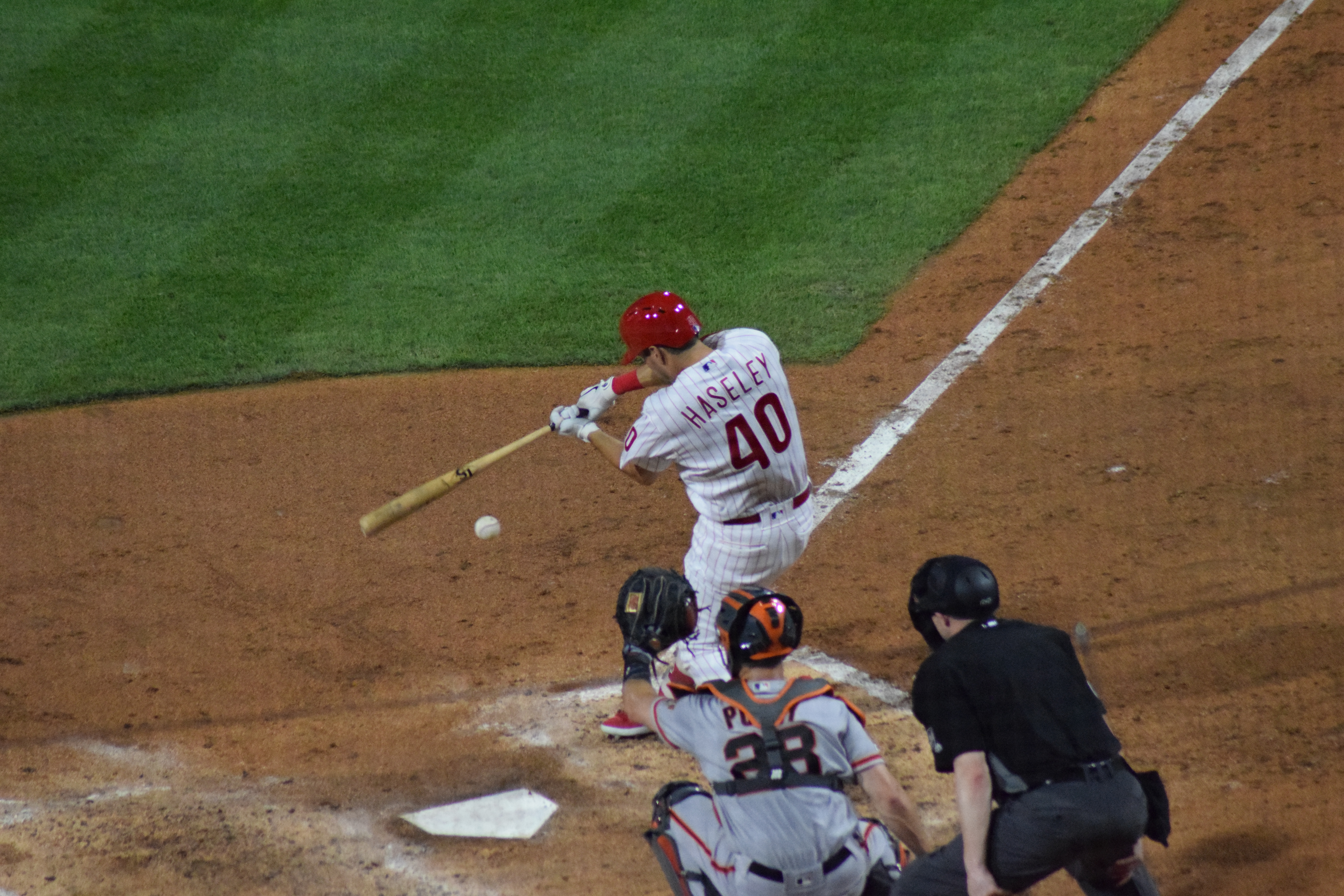
Opening day starter Adam Haseley hit .190 in nine games before leaving the team for personal reasons

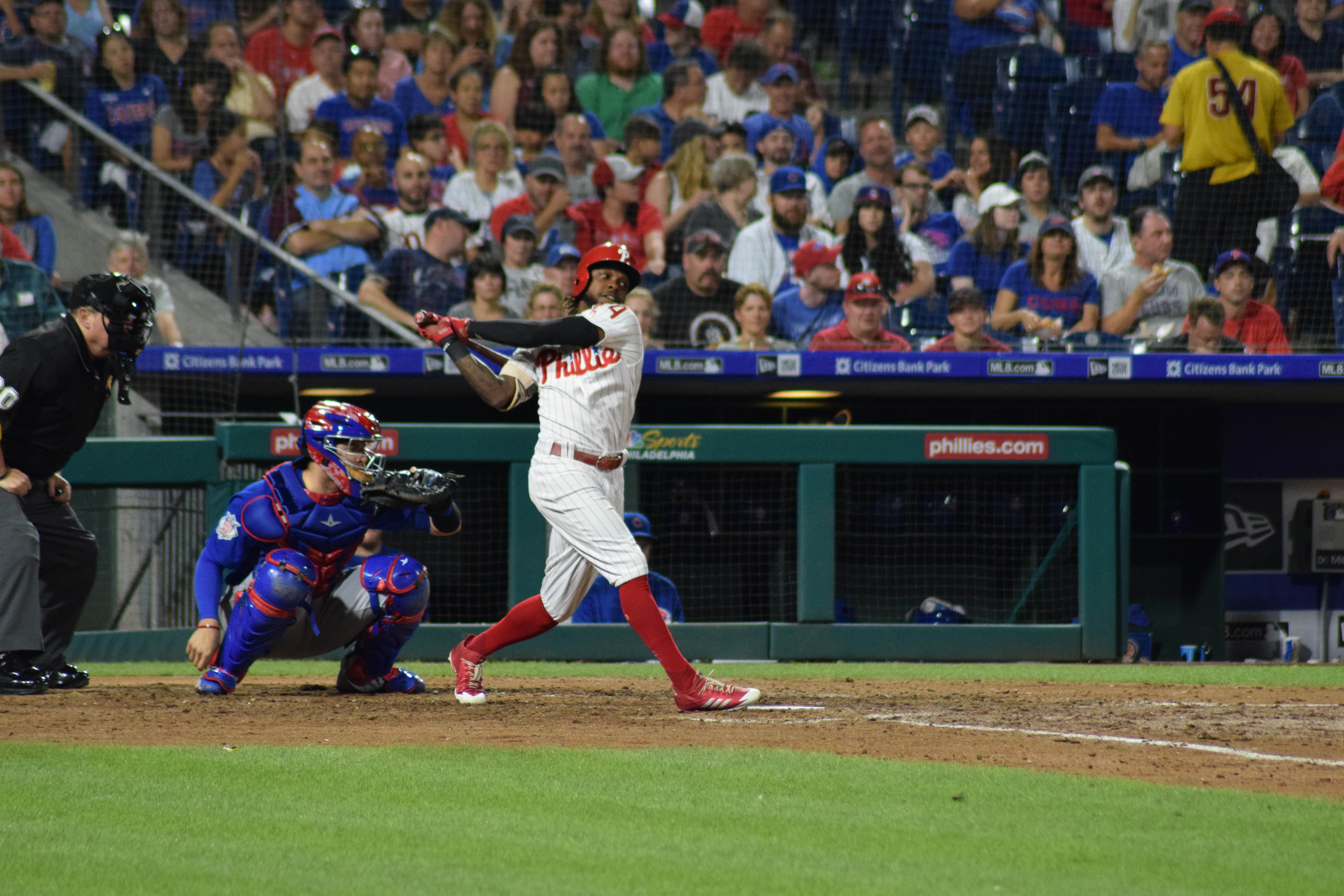
In 21 games, Roman Quinn hit .083 without a home run or RBI in April

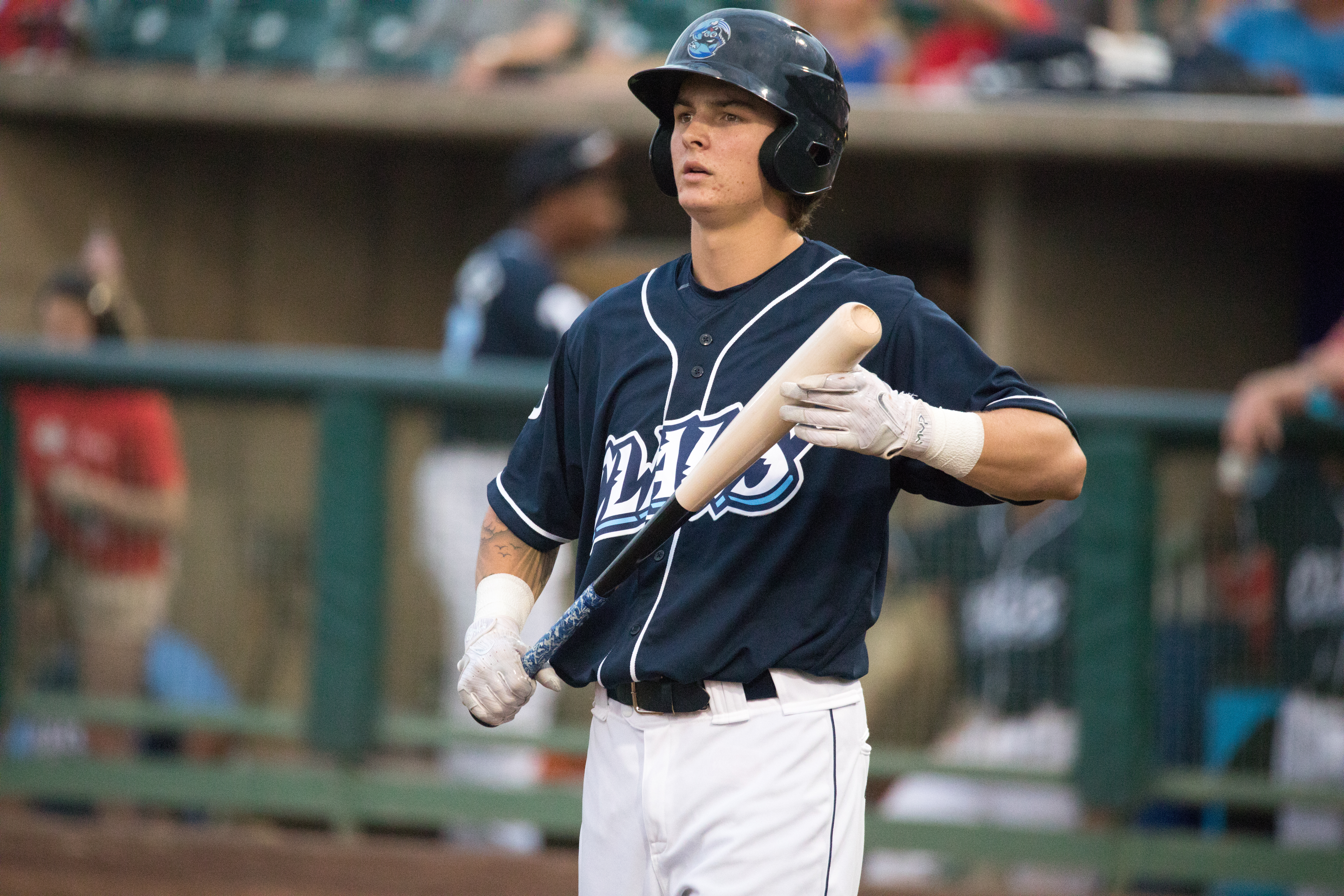
Mickey Moniak was the third starting centerfielder, posting only three hits in nine games before being sent back to the minor leagues

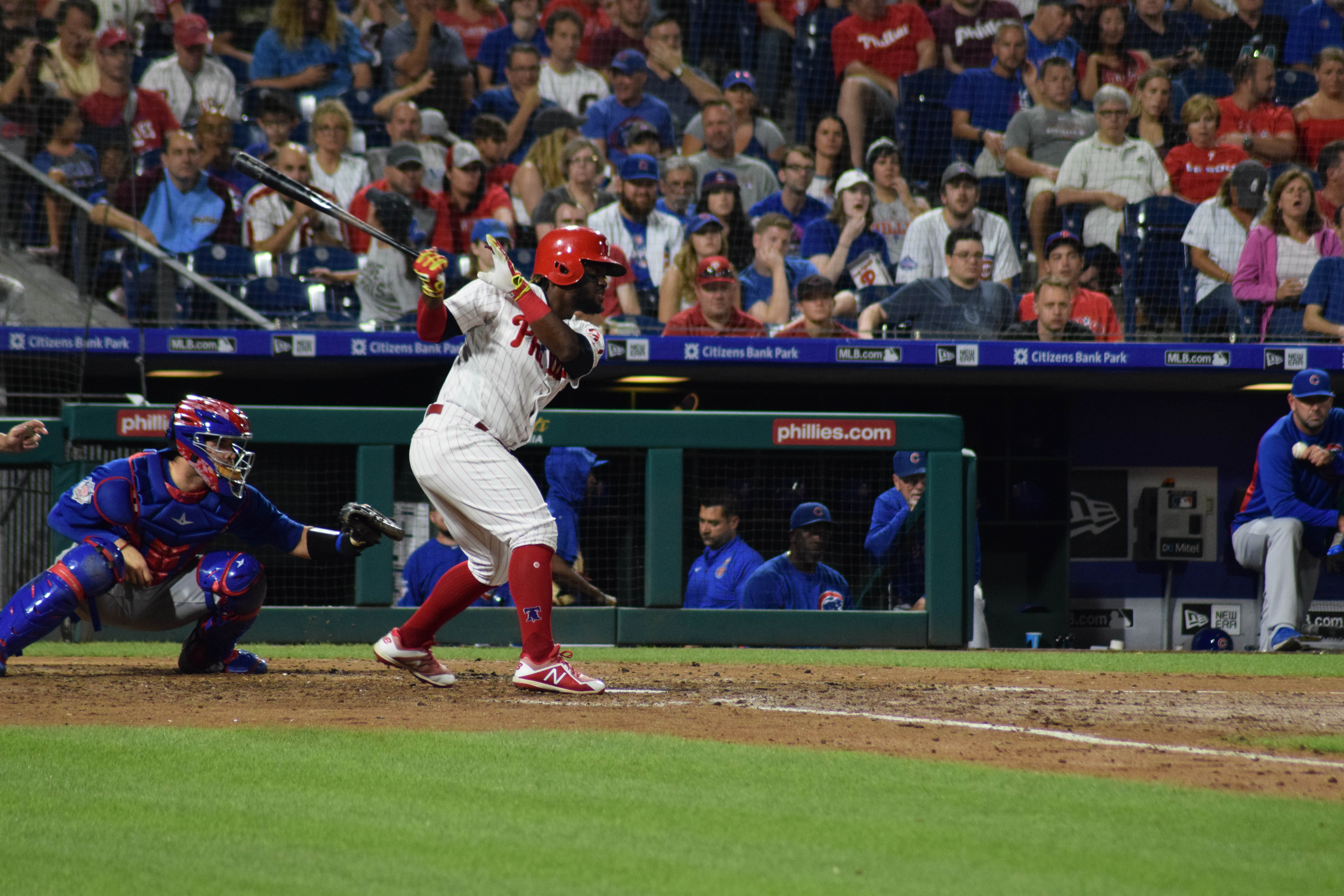
Odubel Herrera returned to the major leagues for the first time since May 2019 and had one hit in his first 14 at-bats

The Phillies used four different starting centerfielders during the season's first month, struggling to find someone who could hit consistently

=== May ===
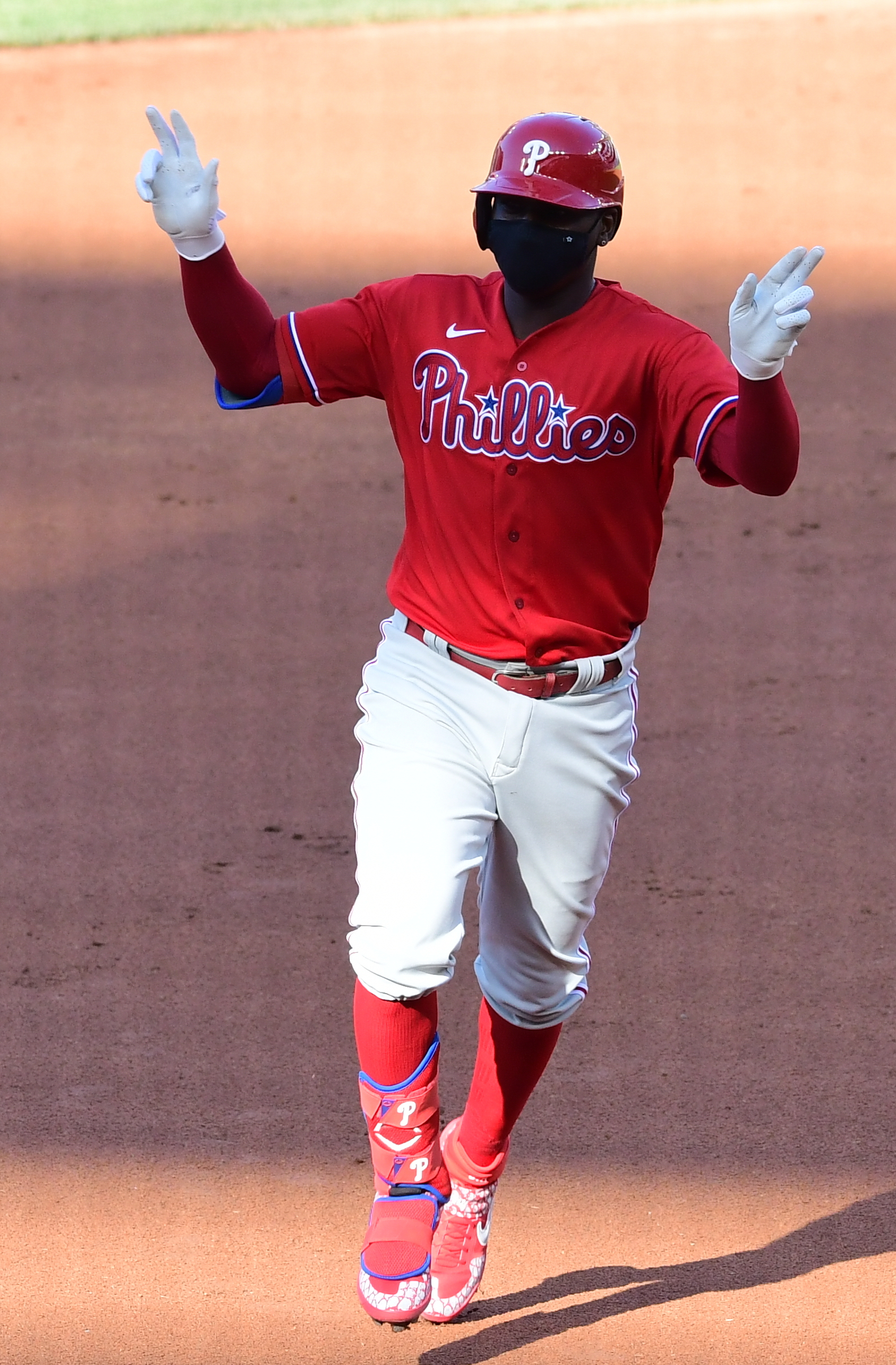
Shortstop Didi Gregorius hit a grand slam on May 5, but he missed several games later in the month due to injury

The Phillies continued their series against the Mets to open the month of May, dropping its second game, on May 1, 5–4. Zack Wheeler had given up four runs in the first inning, but proceeded to throw six scoreless innings after that, allowing the Phillies to battle back and tie the game at four. In the top of the ninth, however, Michael Conforto homered off of Hector Neris to retake the lead for the Mets. The Phillies jumped out to a 4–2 lead in the series rubber match, but surrendered six runs in the eighth inning to let the Mets take an 8–4 lead. In the ninth, Rhys Hoskins hit what appeared to be a game-tying three-run home run, but after an instant replay umpires ruled that the ball did not leave the field, meaning Hoskins had to go back to second base. The Phillies lost 8–7. The Phillies' homestand continued with a four-game series against the Milwaukee Brewers. In game one, the Phillies took an early lead with a two-run home run by J. T. Realmuto. The Brewers narrowed the deficit to one run in the eighth inning, but Hector Neris secured a five-out save and the Phillies held on to win 4–3. Vince Velasquez earned his first winning decision of the season. Game two was similarly close. The Phillies jumped out to a 6–1 lead thanks to a pair of solo home runs from Andrew McCutchen, a three-run home run by Brad Miller, and six strong innings of starting pitching by Aaron Nola, but in the seventh inning, the Brewers scored four runs after an issue with the roster printed on the team's lineup card prevented manager Joe Girardi from bringing in his preferred relief pitcher, Enyel De Los Santos. The Phillies held on to win 6–5, benefitting from a five-out save for the second consecutive night, this time from Sam Coonrod. The pattern of an early lead, letting it become close, and holding on in the end repeated itself in the series' third game, when a five-run first inning highlighted by a Didi Gregorius grand slam was all the Phillies would score en route to a 5–4 win. In game four of the series, the Phillies completed the sweep as Wheeler pitched a complete game shutout in which he surrendered only three hits as the Phillies won 2–0.

The Phillies embarked on a nine-game road trip, beginning in Atlanta. In game one, the Phillies scored six runs in the first inning, including a three-run home run by Odubel Herrera, and won 12–2. Jean Segura returned to the lineup after missing more than two weeks due to injury and posted four hits in five at-bats with two RBIs. In game two, the Phillies took a 3–1 lead into the ninth but surrendered a two-run home run to Pablo Sandoval to send the game into extra innings. The Phillies proceeded to take a one-run lead in the eleventh and a three-run lead in the twelfth, but the Braves fought back on both occasions and notched an 8–7 victory in 12 innings, snapping the Phillies' five-game winning streak. The Braves won game three 6–1 as Nola struggled through four innings and the Phillies' struggles on the road continued. After an off day, the Phillies next traveled to Washington to face the Nationals in a three-game series. In game one, Chase Anderson pitched five innings and allowed two runs, and the Phillies notched six runs, including RBIs from Andrew Knapp, Rhys Hoskins, Andrew McCutchen, and Bryce Harper to win 6–2. The next night, after a defensive miscue that allowed a run to score, Herrera launched a home run to tie the game in the ninth and send it to extra innings, and the Phillies scored three runs in the tenth to win 5–2. With the win, the Phillies clinched their first win of a road series of at least three games since 2019. The Nationals jumped out to an early lead with a pair of two-run home runs in the first inning and beat the Phillies 5–1 to finish the series.

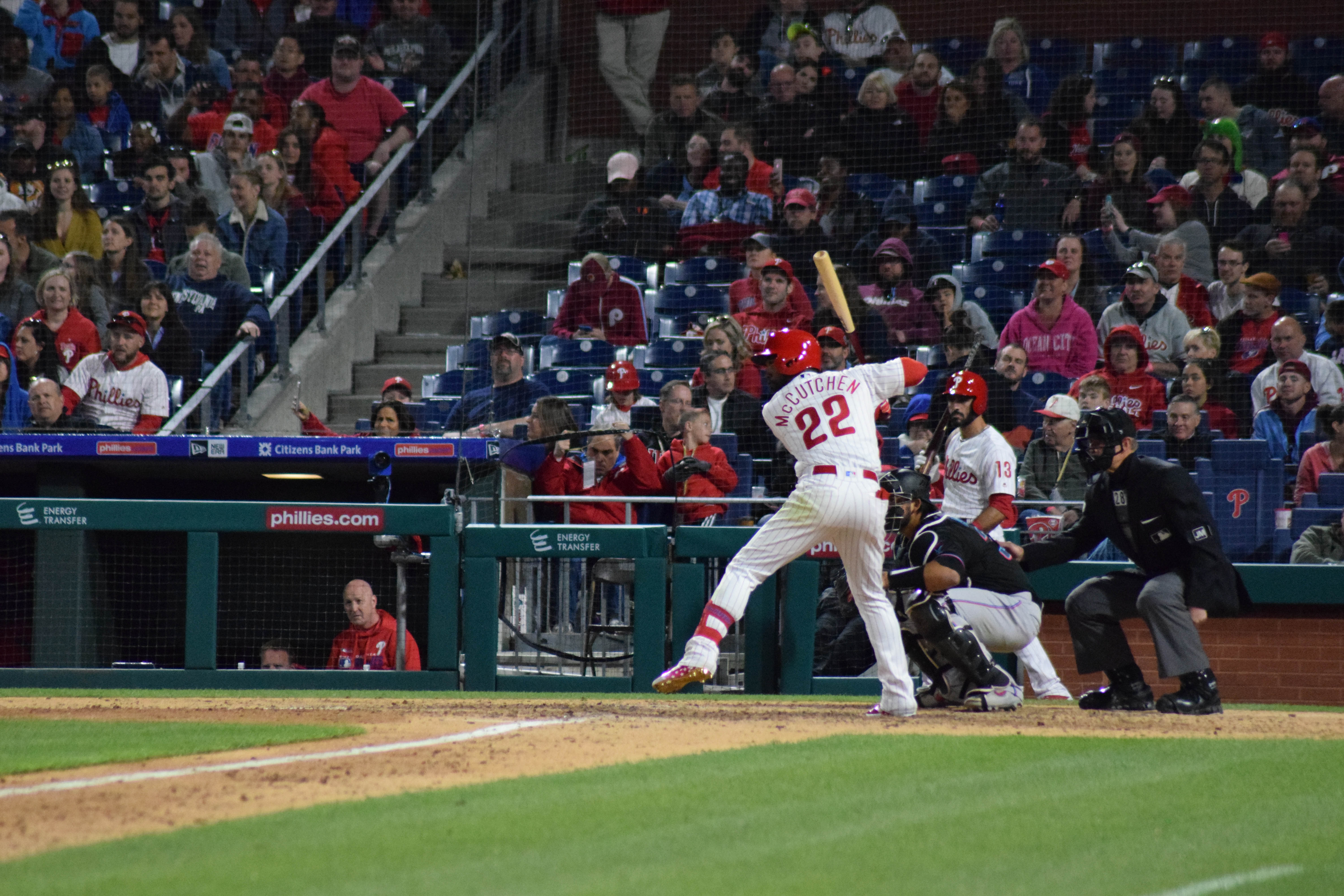
Andrew McCutchen hit his 250th career major league home run on May 19, 2021

The final three-game set of the Phillies' road trip came against the Toronto Blue Jays, but was played in Florida due to COVID-19 pandemic travel restrictions. Velasquez pitched 5 2/3 innings in which he allowed one run and the Phillies scored five runs in the seventh inning—highlighted by a three-run double from Hoskins—en route to a 5–1 victory in game one of the series. The Phillies lost game two 4–0 as Phillies' injuries began to accumulate. During the second game of the series, both Realmuto and Harper left due to injury, joining Gregorius as unavailable but still on the active roster, and prior to Sunday's game, backup catcher Andrew Knapp sustained an injury, forcing Rafael Marchan to start his first game of the season and leaving the Phillies without any healthy bench players for the series' rubber match. The Blue Jays jumped out to an 8–0 lead, but Nick Maton hit two home runs—the first two of his major league career—and a two-run single to help close the gap. When Scott Kingery left the game, Harper entered the game despite having not started due to injury. In Harper's first at-bat, he attempted only to bunt, but with two outs in the ninth, Harper came to the plate as the potential go-ahead run, the Phillies down two. He struck out, and the Phillies lost 10–8, falling to 4–5 for the road trip.

After a day off, the Phillies returned home for their first series against the division rival Miami Marlins. Prior to the series opener, Gregorius was placed on the injured list, and the Phillies activated Ronald Torreyes, who had not played since mid-April, to fill his spot on the roster. During game one, Torreyes pinch hit with the bases loaded in the eighth inning of a tied game and hit a two-run double to give the Phillies the lead. They won 8–3. The Marlins controlled game two, however, limiting the Phillies to just one run—the 250th career home run for Andrew McCutchen—en route to a 3–1 victory. Velasquez was scheduled to start game three of the series, but about 20 minutes before the game began, he was scratched due to a numb finger, forcing David Hale to make a spot start. The Phillies could not muster any runs on offense, however, and lost to the Marlins 6–0.

"This has not been a good week for us. The answer is I think we can get better. I think you need to make the routine plays. That’s what we used to stress ... all the time."
— Phillies President of Baseball Operations Dave Dombrowski on May 21, discussing the Phillies' struggles to make contact at the plate and to make plays in the field

The Phillies' struggles continued as they opened a three-game series against the Boston Red Sox, dropping game one 11–3 amid a raft of errors, miscues, and strikeouts. Spencer Howard made his first start of the season in game two and through two dominant innings before struggling in the third, and the Red Sox took a lead they would not relinquish—despite Rhys Hoskins hitting his 100th career home run, the Phillies lost 4–3, their fourth consecutive defeat, falling two games below .500 for the first time since May 2 and only the second time overall. Wheeler struck out 12 over 7 1/3 innings and Miller hit a three-run home run in the first inning of the series' final game. The Phillies held the lead and won 6–2.

The Phillies closed the month on a road trip that began with a four-game series in Miami. Their defensive struggles continued in game one, which they lost to the Marlins 9–6, prompting a reaction from Girardi that the time for such miscues had passed: "It is not early. It’s not late, but it’s not early. We’re in the middle of the season and we need to play better." The next night, the Phillies mustered only two hits, but thanks to six shutout innings from Velasquez and three shutout innings from the bullpen, managed to win game two of the series 2–0. In game three, the Phillies squandered a lead and fell to the Marlins 4–2 as they continued to be without Harper, Realmuto, and Gregorius. The Phillies salvaged game four, winning 3–2 after Herrera led off the top of the ninth with a triple and scored on a fielder's choice to break the tie. Howard, Ranger Suarez, José Alvarado, and Neris combined to allow just two runs. After an off day, the Phillies traveled to Tampa Bay for a two-game series against the Rays. In game one, the Phillies twice dug out of deficits to tie the game—first via a two-run double from Torreyes and later via a home run from Matt Joyce, his first hit in 28 at-bats—and Wheeler struck out a career high 14 batters over seven innings, but they never took a lead. The Rays won 5–3. The Phillies dropped the second and final game of the series as well, falling 6–2 despite bringing the tying run to the plate in the ninth inning. To close out the month, the Phillies fell 11–1 in a Memorial Day match against the Cincinnati Reds, with Vince Velasquez allowing eight runs in the first three innings, while opposing pitcher Wade Miley held the Phillies to one run in six frames.

=== June ===
The Phillies continued their series against the Reds to open the month of June, tying a franchise record with seven home runs in a 17–3 victory. Ronald Torreyes hit his first home run since 2017, while Aaron Nola became the fastest Phillies pitcher to record 1,000 career strikeouts. The Phillies tied their franchise record by hitting seven home runs in the game: Torreyes, Rhys Hoskins, and Matt Joyce each hit one, while Odubel Herrera and Andrew McCutchen hit two. The final game of the series was rained out.

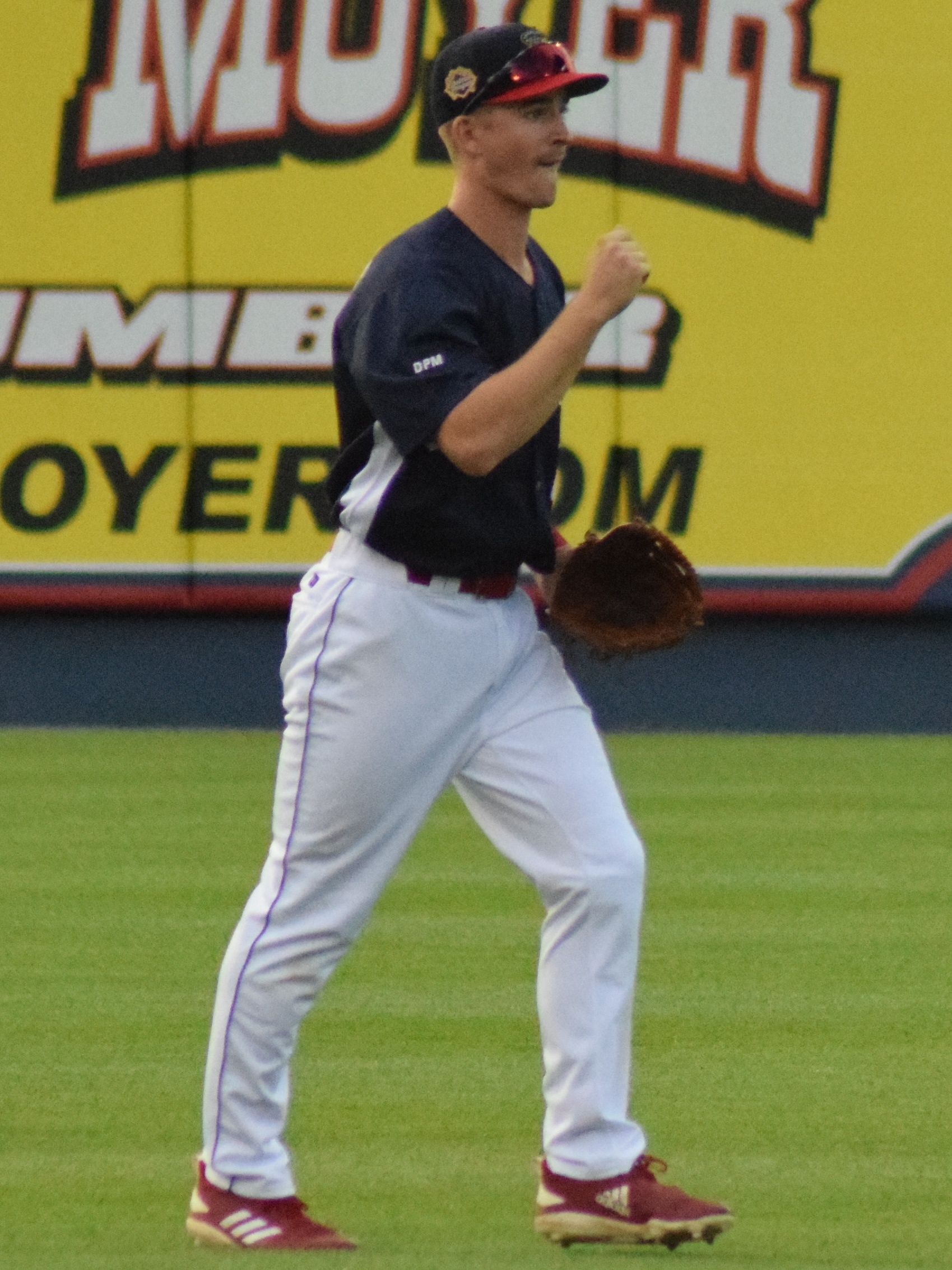
Luke Williams scored a walk-off home run in his first major league start.

The Phillies then returned home to begin a series against the Nationals. In game one, Zack Wheeler and Max Scherzer engaged in a pitchers' duel that Scherzer won as the Nats hung on 2–1. Bryce Harper returned to action and Spencer Howard started game two for the Phillies but lasted only 2 1/3 innings. The Phillies' bullpen—Ranger Suarez, Archie Bradley, Sam Coonrod, Jose Alvarado, and Connor Brogdon—combined to throw the final 6 2/3 innings, allowing only one run, as Brogdon recorded his first career save as the Phillies won 5–2. The Phillies won the series rubber match 12–6 in a four-and-a-half hour game that included J. T. Realmuto's 100th career home run, Andrew McCutchen's 1,000th career run scored, Cristopher Sánchez's major league debut, and a 20-minute delay in the eighth inning when the netting behind home plate fell onto the field. The homestand continued with a three-game series against the Atlanta Braves. Prior to the series opening, the Phillies sent Nick Maton back to the minor leagues and called up Luke Williams to make his major league debut. Although Williams notched his first major league hit, Aaron Nola's struggles continued in game one, and the Phillies blew a lead and lost 9–5. Zach Eflin and Ranger Suarez combined to allow one run over nine innings in game two, but the Phillies were held scoreless until the bottom of the ninth when, in his first major league start, Luke Williams hit a two-run walk-off home run to give the Phillies a 2–1 victory. After Zack Wheeler pitched eight shutout innings in the June 10 rubber match, striking out 12 batters, Hector Néris and Jose Alvárado proceeded to give up three runs in the ninth and tenth inning. Shortstop Jean Segura hit a two-run walk-off RBI single in the bottom of the 10th inning to win the game 4–3 and take the series. The Phillies had a day off before welcoming the New York Yankees to town for a two-game series. In the first game, the Phillies jumped out to a 7–2 lead before the Yankees tied it up in the top of the ninth inning, a blown save by Hector Neris. In the tenth inning, however, Jean Segura hit a walk-off single for the second consecutive game—the Phillies' third straight walk-off win—and the Phillies won 8–7. The next day, the Phillies' victory was more emphatic as they completed a two-game sweep of the Yankees behind 7 2/3 shutout innings from Nola, putting the Phillies above .500 for the first time in the month of June.

The Phillies then traveled west for a three-game series against the Los Angeles Dodgers. Spencer Howard started the first game, giving up two home runs to Will Smith and Chris Taylor, respectively, in the 3–1 loss. The following day, a seventh-inning home run from Mookie Betts crushed the Phillies' comeback, while both Bryce Harper and Jean Segura exited the 5–3 loss due to injury. In the final game of the series, Wheeler, Alvarado, and Neris combined for a shutout to prevent a sweep, while Rhys Hoskins broke his 0-for-33 streak with a solo home run in the 2–0 win. The Phillies continued their California road trip with a three-game series against the San Francisco Giants. Despite two early home runs against opposing pitcher Johnny Cueto, a series of defensive and offensive errors and other mistakes caused the Phillies to drop the first game in the series 5–3. Both lineups came out of the gate early in the second game of the series, with the score tied 6–6 by the third inning. The Phillies broke the tie in the sixth inning with a go-ahead home run to Ronald Torreyes, and continued to dominate throughout the back half of the game, winning 13–6. Hoskins, with a double and a three-run home run, finished the game with six RBIs. The Giants ultimately took the series, with Zach Eflin allowing a career-high four home runs, including back-to-back shots from Mike Yastrzemski and Wilmer Flores in the first inning. The Phillies ultimately lost the game 11–2, taking their season record back below .500.

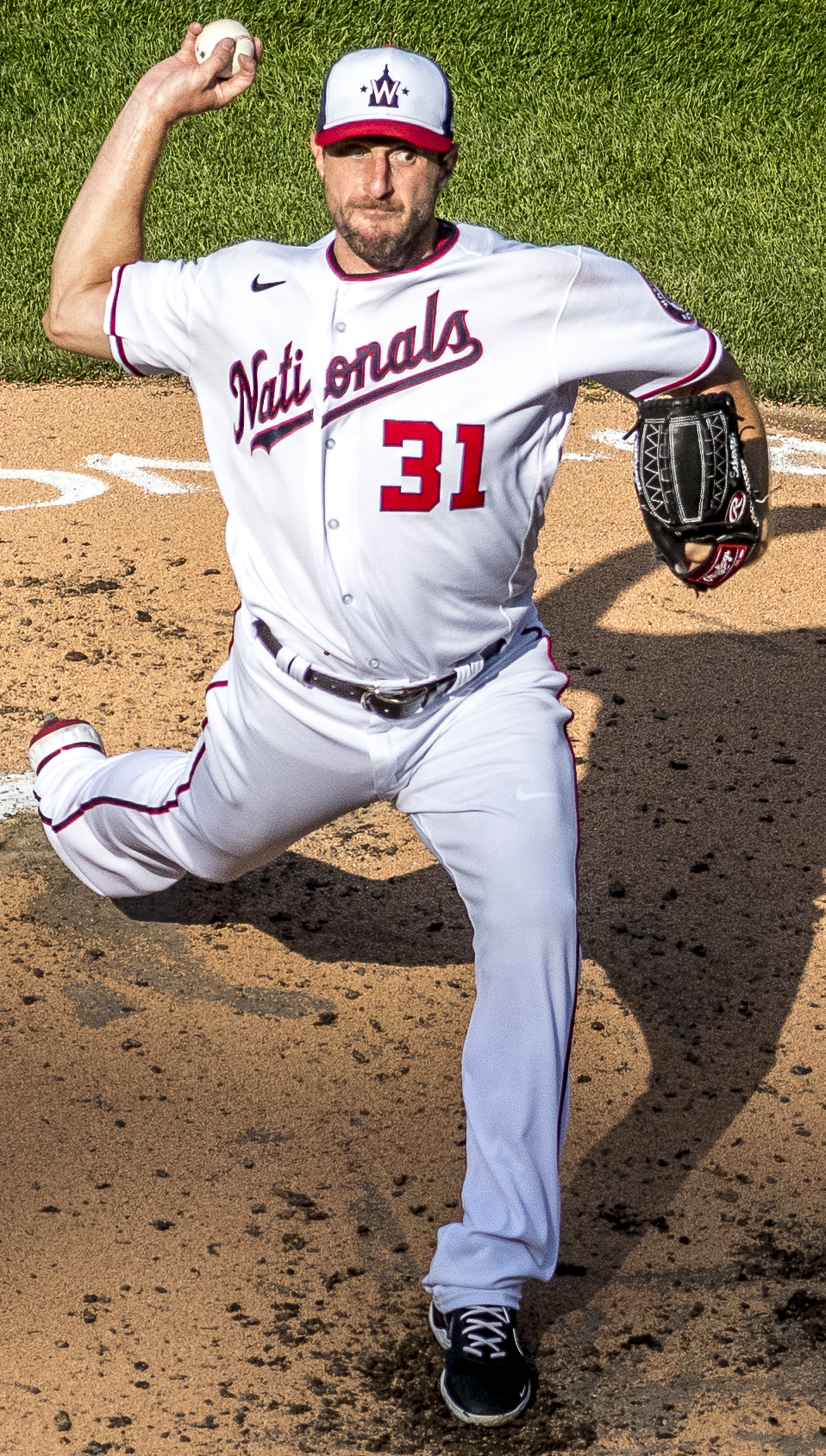
Max Scherzer of the Washington Nationals clashed with manager Joe Girardi over enforcement of MLB's new "sticky stuff" policy.

After their west coast tour, the Phillies returned home for a two-game series against the Nationals. Max Scherzer outpitched Wheeler 3–2 in the first match, while Scherzer and Girardi clashed over MLB's new policy on checking for pine tar, resin, and other "sticky substances" that have been used to doctor balls. Scherzer was examined for illegal substances after the first and third inning, per MLB policy, and after the fourth and fifth inning, at Girardi's request. Girardi was ultimately ejected from the game when it was determined that he had made a "request in bad faith" to check Scherzer for foreign substances. In the second game, which lasted 4 hours and 19 minutes, the Phillies proceeded to give up three leads. First, after Velasquez gave up two runs in the fifth inning, he was replaced by Bradley, who surrendered a game-tying three-run home run to Kyle Schwarber. Andrew McCutchen hit a grand slam in the bottom of the fifth to push the Phillies ahead, only for Sam Coonrod and David Hale to surrender six runs, including a grand slam from Josh Bell, to make the score 11–9. The Phillies clawed ahead to 12–11 in the bottom of the eighth, only for Neris to allow hits to three of the first four batters he faced, giving the Nationals a walk-off 13–12 victory.

Following their sweep at the hands of the Nationals, the Phillies headed to Citi Field for four games against the Mets, beginning with a doubleheader on June 25. Both games went into extra innings, with the Phillies and Mets splitting the day. In the first game, Aaron Nola tied Tom Seaver's 1970 record for most consecutive strikeouts, fanning 10 batters in a row, but a blown save from Alvarado overshadowed the accomplishment as the Phillies lost 2–1. Matt Moore started in the second game, his first time pitching in over a month. He pitched five scoreless innings before an error from Alec Bohm tied the score. The Phillies ultimately won the game 2–1 after a shutout eighth inning from Neris. The next day, Nick Maton ended Mets starter Jacob deGrom's streak of 31 shutout innings with an RBI single that brought McCutchen home. DeGrom gave up three hits in six innings to the Phillies, raising his ERA from 0.50 to 0.69, but a fielding error from Hoskins, combined with another blown save from Neris, caused the Phillies to lose 4–3. The Phillies split the series, with Wheeler pitching seven shutout innings in the 4–2 rubber match victory. Prior to returning home, the Phillies traveled to Cincinnati for a makeup game against the Reds. After leading 4–2, they surrendered 10 runs over two innings to lose 12–4, the team's seventh blown save in six games.

The Phillies returned home to close the month with a homestand that began with a three-game set against the Miami Marlins. Vince Velasquez threw seven shutout innings in game one and the Phillies jumped out to a 4–0 lead, which was enough to overcome three runs surrendered by the bullpen over the final two innings to hang on for a 4–3 victory. The Phillies started the second game of the series with an early lead thanks to a solo home run from Bryce Harper, followed by a two-run triple from Nick Maton, but Aaron Nola proceeded to give up seven runs before being relieved by Neftalí Feliz. A poor bullpen performance, combined with Alec Bohm's 12th error of the season, allowed the Marlins to take the game 11–6. The final game of the series was postponed due to inclement weather, and was rescheduled for a doubleheader in July.

=== July ===
The Phillies' homestand continued with a three-game series against the San Diego Padres. In game one, Zack Wheeler threw 7 2/3 shutout innings and left the game with a 3–0 lead, but the bullpen blew its eighth save in nine days, and the game went into extra innings. Brad Miller hit a walk-off double to salvage the game and give the Phillies a 4–3 victory. The start to game two of the series was delayed by rain, but the Phillies scored four unanswered runs after falling behind 2–0 in the first inning to win 4–2 with Ranger Suarez earning his first major league save. The Phillies could not pull off a sweep, however, falling out of contention after Hector Neris surrendered six runs in the eighth inning—all with two outs—and losing 11–1.

Next, the Phillies traveled to Chicago to play the Cubs, who were mired with a nine-game losing streak entering the series, for four games. Andrew Knapp, Didi Gregorius, Odubel Herrera, Rhys Hoskins, and Alec Bohm all homered in game one, powering the Phillies to a 13–3 victory as the bullpen allowed only one run in five innings of relief for starting pitcher Matt Moore, who allowed two runs in four innings.

On July 13, J. T. Realmuto and Wheeler represented the Phillies in the All-Star game at Coors Field in Denver. Realmuto started the game (after injury kept Buster Posey from starting) going 1-2 with a home run in the fifth inning; the All-Star game homer was the first for the Phillies in 40 years. Wheeler faced 1 batter in the ninth inning, striking him out on 3 pitches.

=== August ===
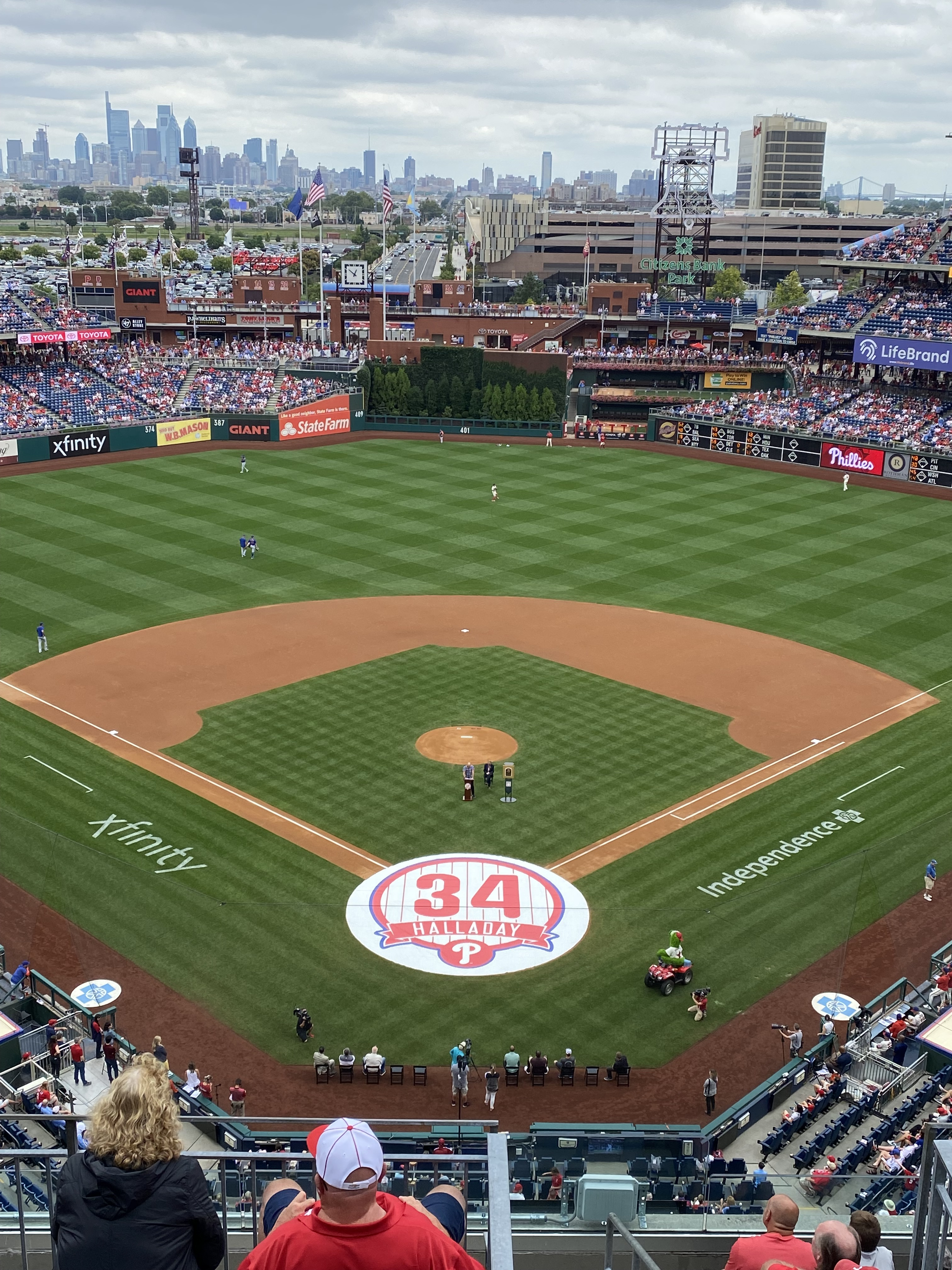
Late pitcher Roy Halladay's No. 34 jersey was formally retired on August 8.

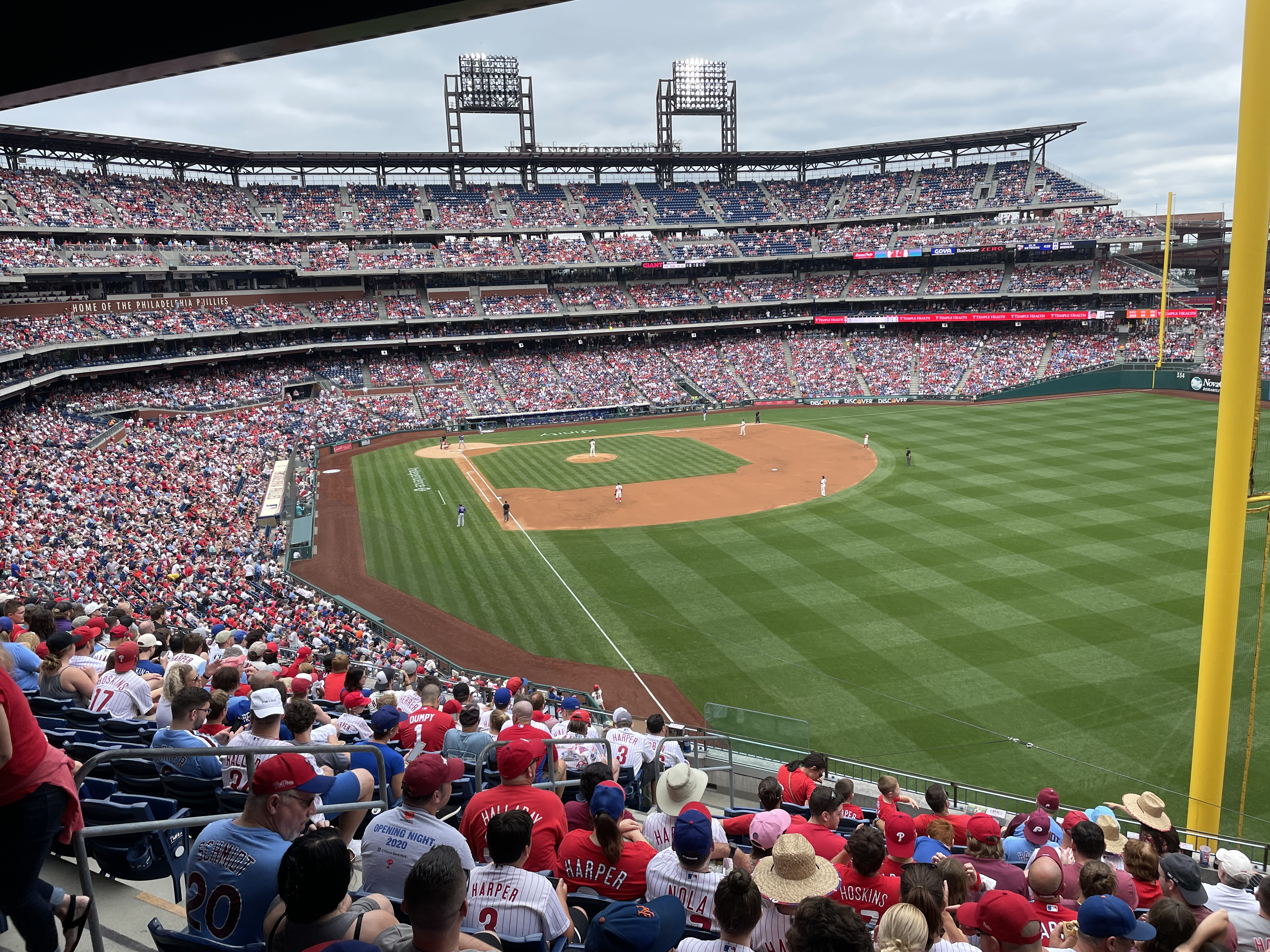
The Phillies take on the New York Mets at Citizens Bank Park on August 8. The Phillies won, 3–0.

On August 8, the Phillies formally retired former pitcher Roy Halladay's No. 34 jersey. Pitcher Zack Wheeler got the start, throwing his first complete game shutout in a 3-0 game and subsequent sweep of the New York Mets. Wheeler retired 22 batters in a row, the first time a Phillies pitcher did so since Halladay's perfect game in 2010.

== Roster ==
All players who made an appearance for the Phillies during 2021 are included.

2021 Philadelphia Phillies
Roster
Pitchers: 46 José Alvarado; 57 Chase Anderson; 52 Cam Bedrosian; 23 Archie Bradley; 75 Connor Brogdon; 54 Sam Coonrod; 51 Hans Crouse; 51 Enyel De Los Santos; 71 Kyle Dohy; 58 Seranthony Domínguez; 56 Zach Eflin; 70 Bailey Falter; 96 Neftalí Feliz; 44 Kyle Gibson; 41 David Hale; 64 JD Hammer; 48 Spencer Howard; 68 Damon Jones; 31 Ian Kennedy; 19 Brandon Kintzler; 63 Mauricio Llovera; 77 Adonis Medina; 31,48 Matt Moore; 50 Héctor Neris; 27 Aaron Nola; 53 David Paulino; 79 JoJo Romero; 60 Ramón Rosso; 61 Cristopher Sánchez; 55 Ranger Suárez; 21 Vince Velasquez; 45 Zack Wheeler	Catchers: 5 Andrew Knapp; 12 Rafael Marchan; 10 J. T. Realmuto; Infielders: 28 Alec Bohm; 8 Freddy Galvis; 18 Didi Gregorius; 17 Rhys Hoskins; 29 Nick Maton; 13 Brad Miller; 2 Jean Segura; 74 Ronald Torreyes	Outfielders: 39 Jorge Bonifacio; 3 Bryce Harper; 40 Adam Haseley; 37 Odúbel Herrera; 9 Travis Jankowski; 7 Matt Joyce; 4 Scott Kingery; 22 Andrew McCutchen; 16 Mickey Moniak; 24 Roman Quinn; 19,44 Matt Vierling; 30 Luke Williams	Manager: 25 Joe Girardi; Coaches: 81 Greg Brodzinski (bullpen catcher); -- Mike Calitri (quality control); 91 Juan Castro (infield coach); 65 Caleb Cotham (pitching); 33 Joe Dillon (hitting); 38 Paco Figueroa (first base coach); 95 Pedro Guerrero (assistant hitting); 94 David Lundquist (bullpen); 92 Bobby Meacham (assistant coach); 82 Bob Stumpo (bullpen catcher); 59 Rob Thomson (bench); 62 Dusty Wathan (third base coach)

== Farm system ==
Level	Team	League	Manager
AAA	Lehigh Valley IronPigs	Triple-A East	Gary Jones
AA	Reading Fightin Phils	Double-A Northeast	Shawn Williams
High A	Jersey Shore BlueClaws	High-A East	Pat Borders
Low-A	Clearwater Threshers	Low-A Southeast	Chris Adamson
Rookie	FCL Phillies	Florida Complex League	Roly de Armas
Rookie	DSL Phillies Red	Dominican Summer League	Warner Santana
Rookie	DSL Phillies White	Dominican Summer League	Orlando Munoz
