= Luke Williams (baseball) =

American baseball player (born 1996)

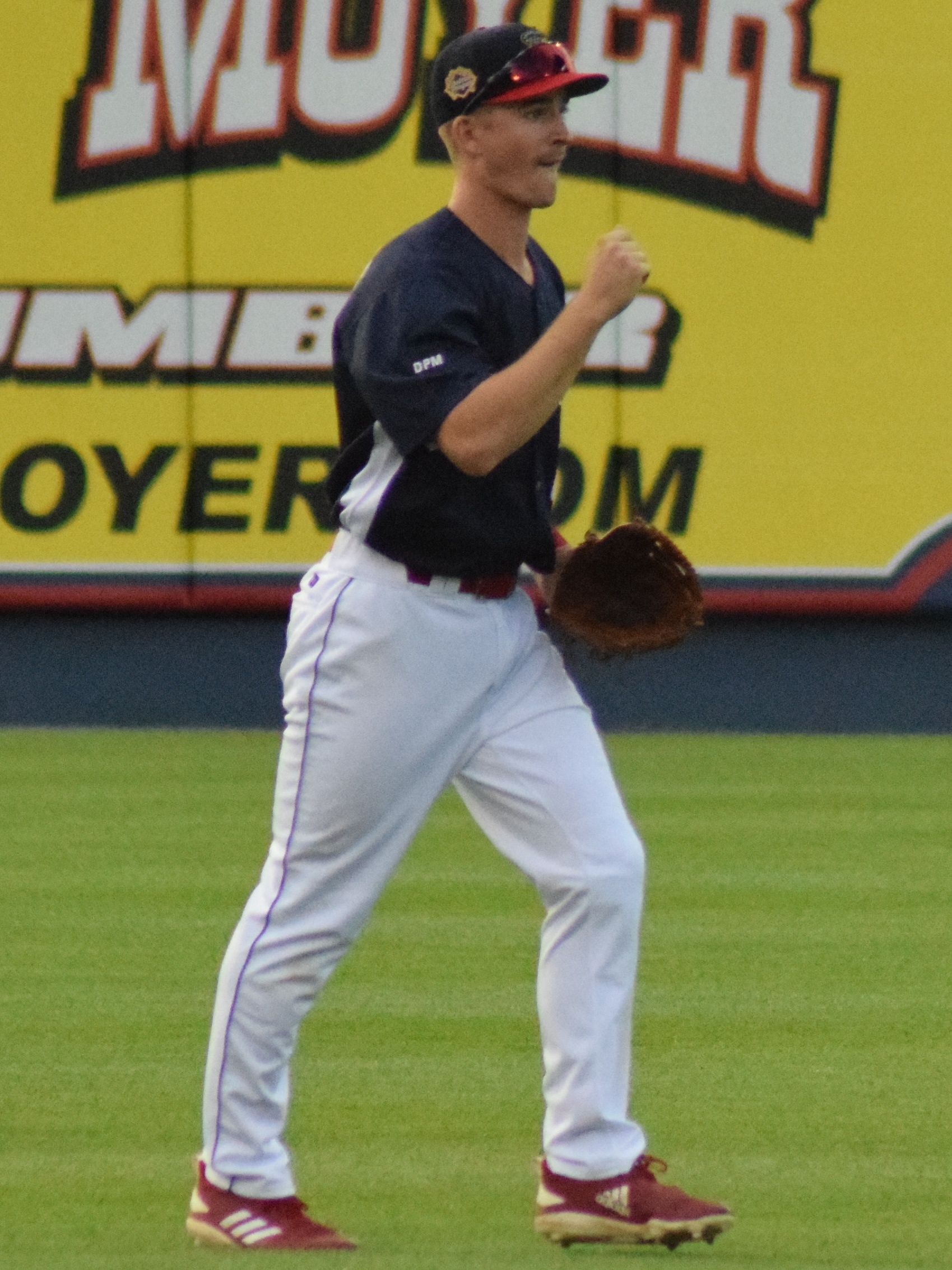
- Williams with the Reading Fightin' Phils in 2019

Free agent
- Utility player
- Born: August 9, 1996 (age 30); Park Ridge, Illinois, U.S.
- Bats: Right Throws: Right

MLB debut
- June 8, 2021, for the Philadelphia Phillies

MLB statistics (through 2026 season)
- Batting average: .212
- Home runs: 2
- Runs batted in: 21
- Stats at Baseball Reference

Teams
- Philadelphia Phillies (2021); San Francisco Giants (2022); Miami Marlins (2022); Los Angeles Dodgers (2023); Atlanta Braves (2023–2026)

Lucas Daniel Williams (born August 9, 1996) is an American professional baseball utility player who is a free agent. He has previously played in Major League Baseball (MLB) for the Philadelphia Phillies, San Francisco Giants, Miami Marlins, Los Angeles Dodgers, and Atlanta Braves. He was drafted by the Phillies in the third round of the 2015 MLB draft, and he made his MLB debut in 2021. He has played every position other than catcher in both the minor leagues and the major leagues.

== Early life ==
Williams was born in Park Ridge, Illinois, and grew up in Orange County, California. He attended Dana Hills High School (2015), where he played baseball and football (as a starting wide receiver and defensive back) and was a sprinter on the track team, competing in the 100-meter dash and the 4 × 100 meters relay.

Playing for the high school baseball team, Williams set Dana Hills' school record for stolen bases in his junior season with 26 in 27 attempts; he matched that mark in his senior year as well. As a sophomore and junior, he played catcher. As a senior, he was team captain and batted .315/.454/.521 and scored 35 runs with 19 RBIs, 26 stolen bases, and four home runs while batting leadoff for much of the season, and had a .975 fielding percentage playing shortstop; he also caught and pitched for the team. He was named 2015 Cal-Hi Sports Second Team All-State. Prior to being drafted, Williams had committed to play college baseball at California Polytechnic over offers from UCLA and California, Irvine.

== Professional career ==
=== Philadelphia Phillies ===
The Philadelphia Phillies selected Williams in the third round of the 2015 Major League Baseball draft. He signed with the team for a $719,800 signing bonus.

Williams was subsequently assigned to the rookie-level Gulf Coast League Phillies, where he played third base and batted .288/.400/.331 with nine stolen bases while being caught twice in 118 at bats. Williams spent the 2016 season with the Low-A Williamsport Crosscutters, playing third base and slashing .220/.297/.301 with two home runs, 11 steals (while being caught twice), and 18 RBI in 186 at-bats.

In 2017, Williams played for the Single-A Lakewood BlueClaws, playing third base and logging a .216/.269/.264 batting line with 41 runs and 29 stolen bases in 31 attempts in 402 at-bats across 115 appearances.

In 2018, Williams played for the High-A Clearwater Threshers, batting .245/.319/.353 with career-highs in runs (51), home runs (9) and RBI (43), with 14 steals in 21 attempts, over 388 at-bats. He played first base, second base, third base, and every outfield position.

Williams spent the 2019 season with the Reading Fightin Phils of the Double-A Eastern League and batted .238/.319/.395 with 77 runs scored (2nd in the league), 30 doubles (2nd), 51 RBI, 5 sacrifice flies (8th), and 44 extra base hits, along with 30 stolen bases (4th) while being caught 9 times, in 441 at-bats. He played every position other than pitcher and catcher.

Williams was a non-roster invitee for the Phillies in spring training in 2020. Williams did not play in a game in 2020 due to the cancellation of the minor league season because of the COVID-19 pandemic. He played winter league for the Adelaide Giants of the Australian Baseball League, batting .292/.299/.361 in 72 at bats. He played every position other than pitcher and catcher.

Williams was named the best overall athlete in the Phillies' minor league system going into the 2021 season and was assigned to the Triple-A Lehigh Valley IronPigs. With Lehigh Valley in 2021, he batted .245/.315/.316 in 98 at bats. He played every position other than pitcher and catcher.

In the minor leagues through 2021 he had played 303 games at third base, 55 games at second base, 47 games in left field, 38 games in right field, 18 games in center field, 16 games at first base, and 14 games at shortstop. He carries 8 gloves in his equipment bag.

Williams received his first major league call-up on June 8, 2021, to take the place of a struggling Nick Maton. He debuted with the Phillies that same day, filling in as a pinch hitter for starting pitcher Aaron Nola in the fifth inning of a game against the Atlanta Braves. In his first at-bat, Williams tripled on a bunt due to an Atlanta throwing error. He reached home in the next at-bat, an RBI double from Jean Segura. The following day, in his first MLB start, Williams hit a two-run walk-off home run in the bottom of the ninth inning, lifting the Phillies to a 2–1 victory over the Braves. Williams remained in the Phillies lineup, sharing time in the outfield with Travis Jankowski. He saw the bulk of his playing time against left-handed pitchers, as well as filling in for an injured Andrew McCutchen. In 98 at bats for the season he hit .245/.315/.316. In the field, he played 15 games in center field, 8 at second base, 8 at third base, 7 in left field, 6 at first base, 5 at shortstop, 3 at third base, and 3 in right field.

He was designated for assignment on March 22, 2022.

=== San Francisco Giants ===
On March 27, 2022, Williams was traded to the San Francisco Giants in exchange for infielder Will Toffey and cash. In eight appearances for San Francisco, he went 3-for-12 (.250) with three RBI. Williams was designated for assignment by the Giants after Michael Papierski was selected to the roster on May 21.

=== Miami Marlins ===
On May 26, 2022, Williams was traded to the Miami Marlins in exchange for infielder Hayden Cantrelle. Williams appeared in 71 games for the Marlins, slashing .235/.290/.313 with one home run, three RBI, and 11 stolen bases.

=== Los Angeles Dodgers ===
On November 8, 2022, Williams was claimed off waivers by the Los Angeles Dodgers. However, they non-tendered him on November 18, making him a free agent. On February 3, 2023, Williams re-signed with the Dodgers on a minor league contract. He was assigned to Triple-A Oklahoma City to begin the season and was called up to the majors on April 18. He had one hit in 10 at-bats with a stolen base in four games for the Dodgers, and hit .268 with six home runs, 29 RBI, and 11 stolen bases in 42 contests for Triple-A Oklahoma City.

=== Atlanta Braves ===
On June 5, 2023, Williams was claimed off waivers by the Atlanta Braves and subsequently assigned to the Gwinnett Stripers. In seven games for Atlanta, he went 0–for–9 with three stolen bases. Williams was non-tendered and became a free agent on November 17.

On November 22, 2023, Williams re-signed with the Braves on a minor league contract. On April 19, 2024, his contract was selected by the Braves. In 34 appearances for Atlanta, Williams slashed .196/.275/.261 with four RBI and three stolen bases.

On March 20, 2025, Williams was removed from the 40-man roster and sent outright to Triple-A Gwinnett. On May 9, the Braves selected Williams' contract, adding him to their active roster. He was designated for assignment by the team on September 4. On September 6, Williams cleared waivers and was sent outright to Triple-A Gwinnett. On September 14, the Braves added Williams back to their active roster. In 39 total appearances for Atlanta, he slashed .129/.176/.194 with five RBI and five stolen bases. On October 1, Williams was removed from the 40-man roster and sent outright to Gwinnett; he elected free agency the following day.

On January 18, 2026, Williams re-signed with the Braves organization on a minor league contract. On April 11, his contract was selected by the Braves. On April 13, Williams was designated for assignment by Atlanta after going hitless in two appearances. He cleared waivers and elected free agency on April 15. The following day, Williams re-signed with the Braves organization on a minor league contract. On September 29, the Braves added Williams to their active roster ahead of the team's Wild Card matchup against the Philadelphia Phillies. On October 9, he was designated for assignment by Atlanta. On October 14, he was sent outright to Gwinnett. He subsequently elected free agency the next day.

== International career ==
In May 2021, Williams was named to the roster of the United States national baseball team for the qualifying tournament for the 2020 Summer Olympics. He started all four of Team USA's games and led the team with a .444 batting average (8–18), six runs scored, and six RBIs.

== Player profile ==
Williams is considered a utility player; he was inspired to take on a "super-utility" role after learning that Ben Zobrist spent 14 years in MLB while playing whatever position was asked of him. Williams' versatility on defense, as well as his speed, have also drawn praise from retired Los Angeles Angels manager Mike Scioscia, who wrote a scouting report that complimented Williams' ability to "run and do a lot of different things".

== Personal life ==
Williams has two brothers named Ike and Jake and a sister named Sami. Sami has played college softball for the Iowa State Cyclones, and in 2021, she became the first National Fastpitch Coaches Association All-American softball player in school history.
