= Connor Brogdon =

American baseball player (born 1995)

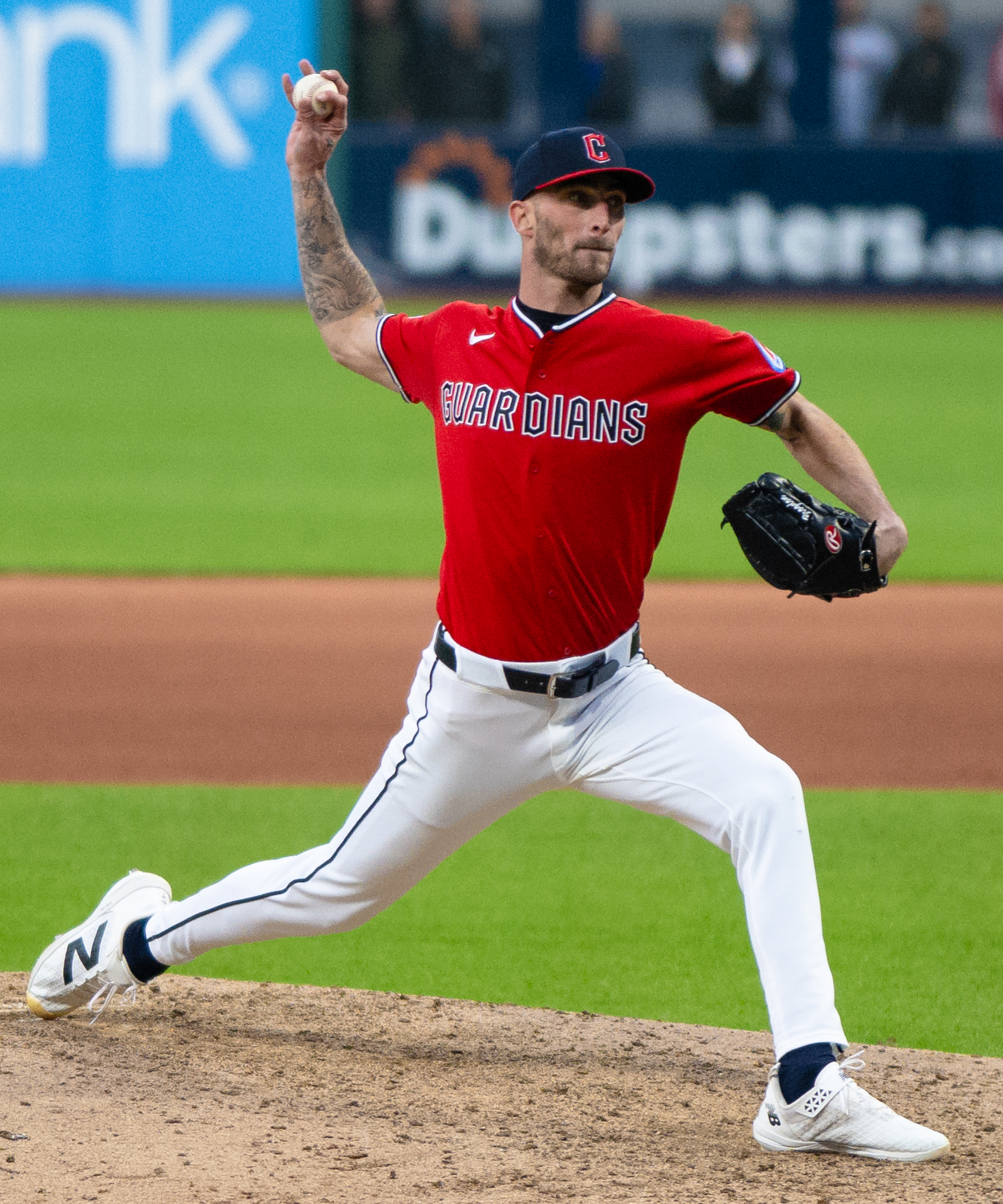
- Brogdon with the Cleveland Guardians in 2026

Free agent
- Pitcher
- Born: January 29, 1995 (age 31); Clovis, California, U.S.
- Bats: Right Throws: Right

MLB debut
- August 13, 2020, for the Philadelphia Phillies

MLB statistics (through 2026 season)
- Win–loss record: 15–12
- Earned run average: 4.41
- Strikeouts: 210
- Stats at Baseball Reference

Teams
- Philadelphia Phillies (2020–2024); Los Angeles Dodgers (2024); Los Angeles Angels (2025); Cleveland Guardians (2026)

Connor Michael Brogdon (born January 29, 1995) is an American professional baseball pitcher who is a free agent. He has previously played in Major League Baseball (MLB) for the Philadelphia Phillies, Los Angeles Dodgers, Los Angeles Angels, and Cleveland Guardians.

Brogdon was born in Clovis, California, and attended Liberty High School in Madera. Although he was drafted by the Atlanta Braves in the 40th round of the 2013 MLB draft, he decided to attend Fresno City College rather than sign with the team. After two seasons there, he transferred to Lewis–Clark State College, where he was part of the 2017 NAIA World Series championship team.

The Phillies drafted Brogdon in the 10th round of the 2017 MLB draft. He was originally intended to be a starting pitcher but became a reliever in the minor leagues to make room in the starting rotation. Brogdon played for three seasons in the Phillies' farm system and was invited to an alternate training site after the 2020 minor league season was canceled. He made his MLB debut on August 13, 2020, giving up three runs to the Baltimore Orioles, but he improved his performance in September.

== Early life ==
Brogdon was born in Clovis, California on January 29, 1995, and attended Liberty High School in Madera alongside San Francisco Giants prospect J.J. Santa Cruz. The Atlanta Braves of Major League Baseball (MLB) drafted Brogdon in the 40th round of the 2013 MLB draft, but he elected to attend college instead. Although Brogdon signed a National Letter of Intent to play for Fresno State, he instead attended Fresno City College. In his two seasons with Fresno City College, Brogdon had a 9–0 win–loss record and a 1.85 earned run average (ERA), and he was named the Central Valley Conference Pitcher of the Year.

After his sophomore year, Brogdon transferred to Lewis–Clark State College, where he was used as a starting pitcher. In his first season at Lewis–Clark, Brogdon posted a 6–0 record, a 2.81 ERA, and 48 strikeouts in 11 games started and 51 1/3 innings pitched. The next year, Brogdon recorded an 8–1 record in 15 games, led the team in innings pitched with 80 1/3, and was part of the National Association of Intercollegiate Athletics (NAIA) World Series-winning team. His pitching velocity began to suffer in his senior season, dropping from the mid-90 mph (140 km/h) range to the mid-80 mph (130 km/h) range. Philadelphia Phillies scout Hilton Richardson told The Athletic, "I don't want to say they abused him, but he got worked a lot."

== Professional career ==
=== Draft and minor leagues (2017–2019) ===
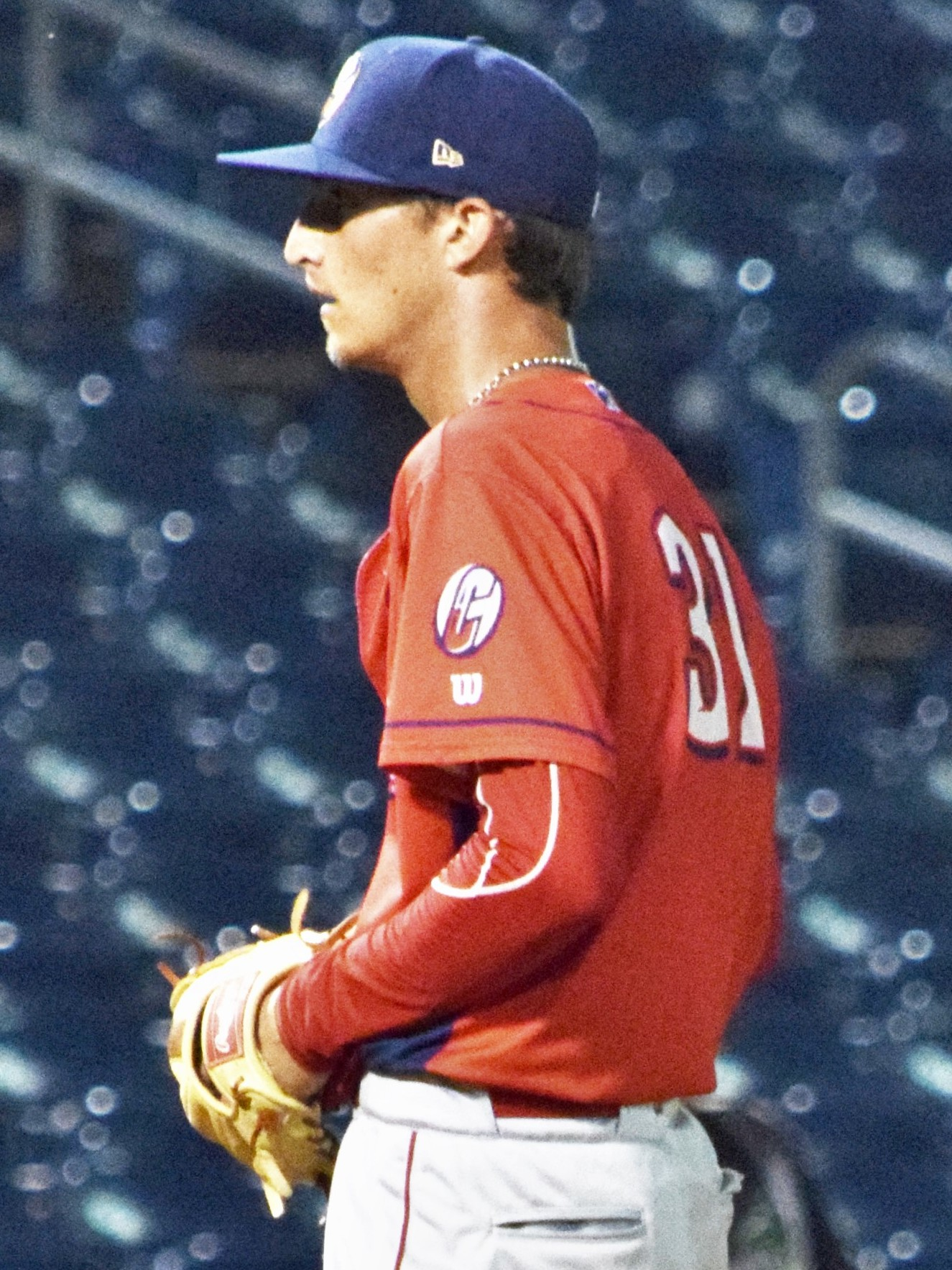
Brogdon with the Williamsport Crosscutters in 2017

The Phillies selected Brogdon in the 10th round, 293rd overall, in the 2017 MLB draft. He was the highest Lewis–Clark draft pick since Beau Mills, who was taken in the first round. He signed with the team that year for a $5,000 signing bonus. Brogdon made his professional debut on June 26, 2017, with the Low–A Williamsport Crosscutters, pitching 1 1/3 innings in a 9–5 loss against the Auburn Doubledays. Initially signed as a starting pitcher, Brogdon was moved to the Crosscutters' bullpen to make room in the starting rotation for Spencer Howard and Connor Seabold. In 16 appearances and 34 2/3 innings with the Crosscutters that season, Brogdon posted a 3–1 record and a 2.34 ERA.

The next season, Brogdon was named to the preliminary Opening Day roster for the Single–A Lakewood BlueClaws alongside Crosscutters teammate Howard. Overall, he went 5–3 with a 2.47 ERA, but his ERA was only 1.42 in his 38 innings as a reliever. Brogdon continued to ascend through the farm system the next season, beginning 2019 with the High–A Clearwater Threshers. He made only 10 appearances with the Threshers before receiving a promotion to the Double-A Reading Phillies. After only 15 games, he was promoted again to the Triple-A Lehigh Valley IronPigs. Across all three minor-league teams that year, Brogdon had a combined 6–2 record and a 2.61 ERA in 51 appearances.

=== Philadelphia Phillies (2020–2024) ===
In response to the COVID-19 pandemic, MLB canceled the 2020 Minor League Baseball season. The Phillies chose to invite a handful of relievers, including Brogdon, to an alternative training site in Allentown, Pennsylvania, in case they were needed in the majors. Brogdon was officially called up to the Phillies' roster on August 11, 2020. He made his MLB debut on August 13, appearing in the eighth inning to relieve Austin Davis against the Baltimore Orioles. On Brogdon's first pitch, Pedro Severino hit a solo home run. After recording two outs, Brogdon surrendered another home run, this one a two-run blast, to Rio Ruiz. He was then pulled, having thrown 38 pitches in his debut. His performance improved in September, as he recorded 14 strikeouts in 8 2/3 shutout innings that month. Brogdon recorded his first career win on September 18, 2020, in the second game of a doubleheader against the Toronto Blue Jays. He finished the season with a 1–0 record and a 3.97 ERA in 11 1/3 innings pitched.

The Phillies called on Brogdon to pitch in the tenth inning of the season opener against the Atlanta Braves on April 1, 2021. He threw a shutout inning and was credited with the win. Brogdon did not allow a run in the 2021 MLB season until April 20, when he gave up two three-run home runs to Alex Dickerson and Wilmer Flores of the San Francisco Giants, causing the Phillies to lose 10–6.

Going into the 2022 season, some sportswriters expressed concern about Brogdon's performance in spring training: his fastball velocity had decreased from 96.1 mph (154.7 km/h) to 92–93 mph (148–150 km/h), while he had trouble commanding breaking balls. He told The Philadelphia Inquirer that the 2021–22 MLB lockout had negatively impacted his practice regimen, because he did not know when the 2022 MLB season would begin, and that he was "just treading water" in spring training. After allowing two runs in 2/3 of an inning during the Phillies' 9–6 loss to the New York Mets on April 13, Brogdon was sent back down to Triple-A.

In the 2022 regular season with the Phillies, he was 2–2 with two saves and a 3.27 ERA in 47 relief appearances covering 44 innings with 50 strikeouts. Brogdon pitched in 27 contests for Philadelphia in 2023, registering a 4.03 ERA with 26 strikeouts across 29 innings pitched.

Brogdon was not guaranteed a place on the Phillies' 2024 opening day roster, but he was out of minor league options, and injuries to Taijuan Walker and Orion Kerkering made room for Brogdon in the major league bullpen. He made three appearances to start the year, going 0–1 with a 27.00 ERA in two innings pitched. On April 2, the day after he allowed a grand slam to Spencer Steer of the Cincinnati Reds, Brogdon was designated for assignment.

=== Los Angeles Dodgers (2024) ===
On April 6, 2024, Brogdon was traded to the Los Angeles Dodgers in exchange for Benony Robles. After only one appearance for the Dodgers, he was placed on the injured list with plantar fasciitis in his right foot on April 13. Brogdon was transferred to the 60-day injured list on May 19. He was removed from the 40-man roster and outrighted to the minors on November 14. Brogdon subsequently rejected the assignment and elected free agency the following day.

=== Los Angeles Angels (2025) ===
On December 23, 2024, Brogdon signed a minor league contract with the Los Angeles Angels. He began the 2025 season with the Triple-A Salt Lake Bees, struggling to a 12.89 ERA with 21 strikeouts over 13 initial outings. On May 6, 2025, the Angels selected Brogdon's contract, adding him to their active roster. Brogdon was designated for assignment by the Angels on August 17. He cleared waivers and was sent outright to Salt Lake on August 19. However, Brogdon rejected the assignment and elected free agency the following day. On August 28, Brogdon re-signed with the Angels on a minor league contract. On September 12, the Angels added Brogdon back to their active roster. He made 43 total appearances for Los Angeles, compiling a 3–2 record and 5.55 ERA with 49 strikeouts over 47 innings of work. On October 22, Brogdon was removed from the 40-man roster and sent outright to Salt Lake; he subsequently rejected the assignment and elected free agency.

=== Cleveland Guardians (2026–present) ===
The Cleveland Guardians signed Brogdon to a one-year, $900,000 contract on December 3, 2025. He made 15 appearances for the Guardians, compiling a 2–2 record and 5.28 ERA with 14 strikeouts and one save across 15 1/3 innings pitched. On May 8, 2026, Brogdon was designated for assignment following the promotion of Franco Alemán. He cleared waivers and was sent outright to the Triple-A Columbus Clippers on May 14. The Guardians selected Brogdon's contract once again on September 13, with Alemán being optioned to Columbus to clear space on the active roster. Brogdon was designated for assignment on September 23. He was sent outright to Columbus on September 25. On October 20, Brogdon elected free agency.

== Pitcher profile ==
Brogdon relies primarily on a three-pitch repertoire: a fastball, a changeup, and a hybrid of a cutter and a slider. In 2020, his average fastball velocity was 96 mph (154 km/h), an improvement over his minor league speed. Speaking after the 2020 season, Brogdon has said that his focus, as he continues his baseball career, is to be able to sustain 97 mph (156 km/h) fastball speeds over longer stretches at the mound. He developed his changeup while playing with the Reading Phillies, and is capable of reaching speeds up to 83 mph (134 km/h) with it. The "cut-slider" is his newest pitch, developed during his 2019 stint in the minors.
