= Rafael Marchán =

Venezuelan baseball catcher (born 1999)

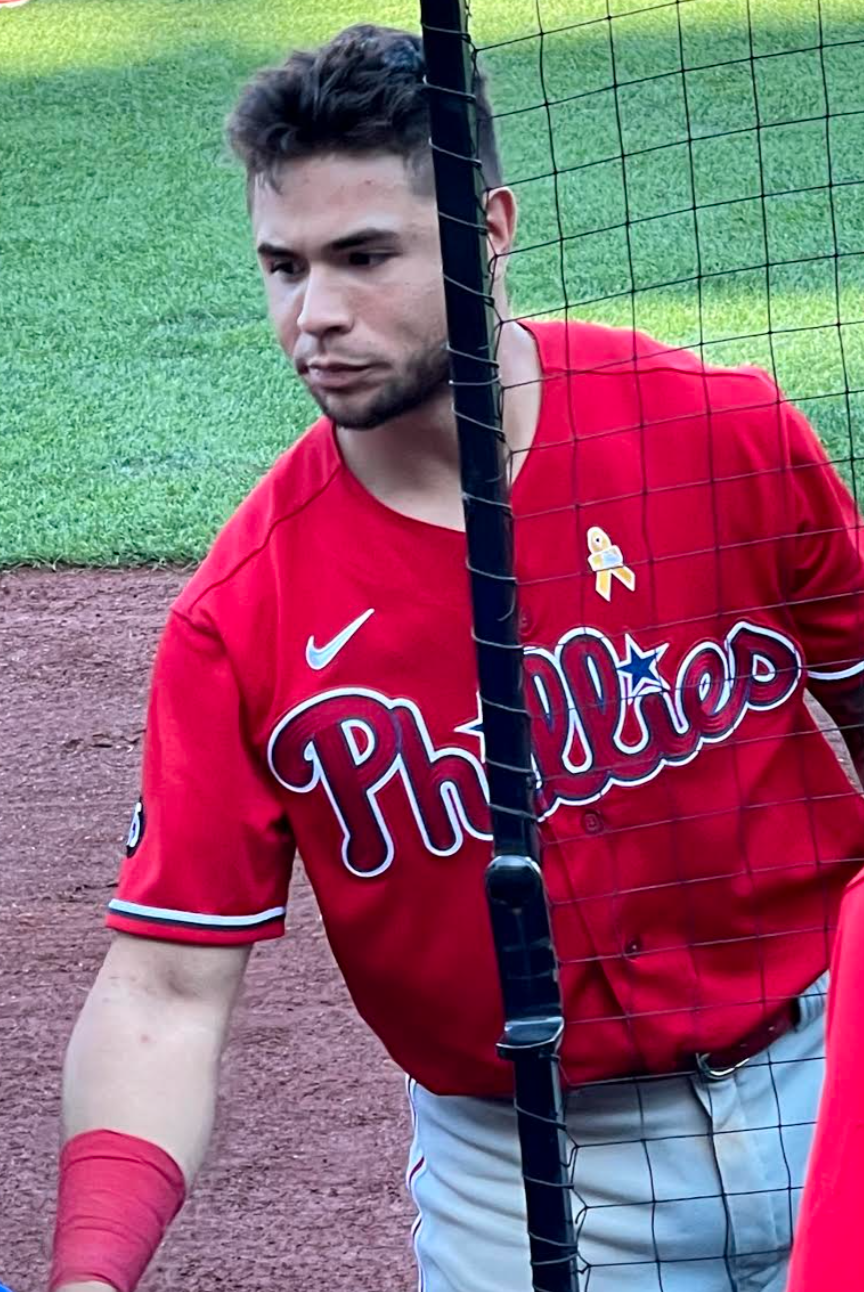
- Marchan with the Philadelphia Phillies in 2021

Philadelphia Phillies – No. 13
- Catcher
- Born: February 25, 1999 (age 27); San Cristóbal, Venezuela
- Bats: Switch Throws: Right

MLB debut
- September 14, 2020, for the Philadelphia Phillies

MLB statistics (through 2026 season)
- Batting average: .202
- Home runs: 9
- Runs batted in: 32
- Stats at Baseball Reference

Teams
- Philadelphia Phillies (2020–2021, 2024–present)
Medals
Men's baseball
Representing Venezuela
U-15 Baseball World Cup
Bronze medal – third place	2014 Mazatlán	Team

Rafael Alejandro Marchán (born February 25, 1999) is a Venezuelan professional baseball catcher for the Philadelphia Phillies of Major League Baseball (MLB). Marchan signed with the Phillies organization as an amateur free agent in 2015, at age 16. Originally an infielder, he converted to catcher. Despite never having played above the High–A level of the minor leagues, he entered major league spring training in and eventually made his major league debut in 2020. He returned to the minor leagues before the start of the 2021 season.

== Early life ==
Marchan was born on February 25, 1999, in San Cristóbal, Táchira, Venezuela. He grew up playing baseball, primarily as a shortstop, a popular position among Venezuelan adolescents hoping to break into professional baseball, and his childhood role model was Venezuelan shortstop Omar Vizquel. Shortly before his 16th birthday, as he was not attracting interest as a shortstop, he was encouraged by a handful of scouts to try catching, which would encourage his chances of being taken by a Major League Baseball (MLB) team. He made his catching debut at an under-15 baseball tournament in Mexico during the summer of 2015, which caught the attention of a number of international MLB scouts. The Philadelphia Phillies of MLB ultimately signed Marchan as an international free agent in July 2015 for a signing bonus of $200,000.

== Career ==
=== Minor leagues ===
After spending the end of the 2015 baseball season practicing catching in the Florida Instructional League, Marchan spent 2016 with the Dominican Summer League (DSL) Phillies, predominantly catching but with six appearances at first base. In 44 games for the DSL Phillies, he batted .333 with no home runs and 34 runs batted in (RBIs) in 171 at bats. He spent 2017 with the Gulf Coast League (GCL) Phillies, batting .238/.290/.298 with no home runs and 10 RBIs in 30 games and 84 at bats.

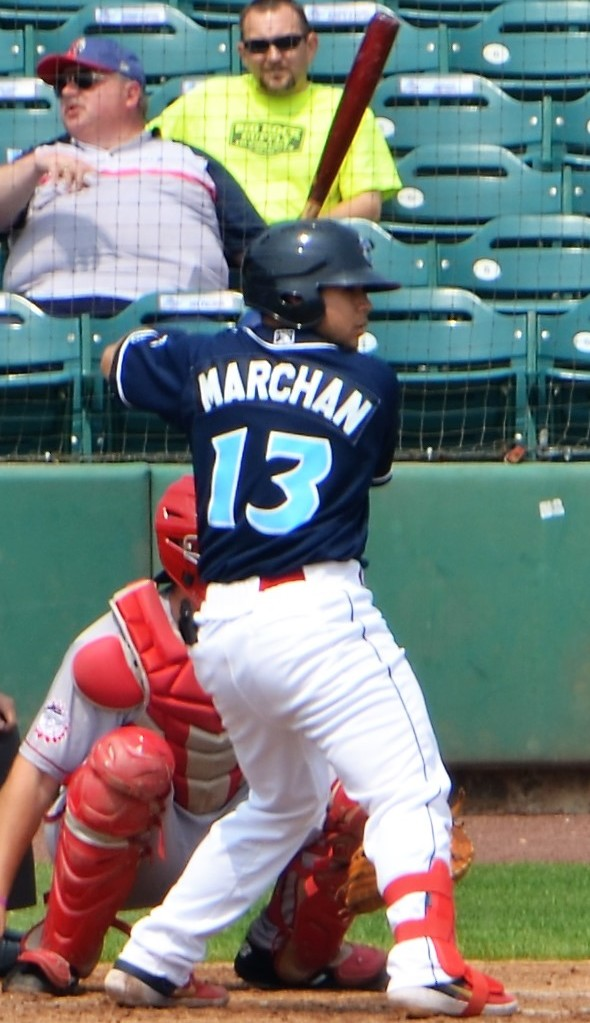
Marchan with the Lakewood Blueclaws in 2019

In 2018, Marchan was promoted to the Williamsport Crosscutters of the Low–A New York-Penn League (NYPL), where he drew praise from his coaches as both a catcher and a batter: in addition to improving his ability to handle pitchers and call games from behind the plate, by the NYPL All-Star game in August, the switch-hitting Marchan was batting .297 left-handed and .325 right-handed. Marchan appeared at the All-Star Game that summer, reaching base in five of his six plate appearances. At the end of the year, leading the team with nine stolen bases (while being caught six times; 2nd in the league) and fourth in the NYPL with a .301 batting average, as he had no home runs and 12 RBIs in 196 at bats, Marchan was named the Crosscutters' most valuable player (MVP).

Marchan was promoted to the Single-A Lakewood BlueClaws to start the 2019 season, forming a catching platoon with fellow prospect Abrahan Gutierrez. On July 30, after batting .271 with no home runs and 20 RBIs in 63 games for Lakewood, the Phillies promoted Marchan to the High–A Clearwater Threshers of the Florida State League, with whom he batted .231/.291/.282 with no home runs and three RBIs in 78 at bats. Between the two teams, Marchan batted .261 in 85 minor-league games in 2019, with no home runs, 23 RBIs, and two stolen bases, while being caught stealing five times. Despite hitting .285 with a .687 on-base plus slugging (OPS) thus far in his minor league career, as well as a .988 fielding percentage and catching 36 percent of attempted base stealers, there was some concern from SABRmetrics analysts that, after 846 plate appearances and four full seasons in Minor League Baseball (MiLB), Marchan had yet to hit a home run. Marchan was left unprotected in that November's Rule 5 Draft, but was unclaimed by other MLB teams, in part because he was 21 years old and had not played in Double A or higher.

=== Major leagues ===
After impressing manager Joe Girardi, himself a former catcher, Marchan was invited to the Phillies' 2020 spring training. Rather than being poised for a promotion, the team used the opportunity to observe him in action and give him advice: for example, while catching bullpen sessions for major league pitchers like Aaron Nola and Ranger Suárez, Marchan's coaches would watch to see if he was giving away the pitches he called by taking on certain stances. When the COVID-19 pandemic forced the cancellation of the 2020 minor league season, Marchan was one of several Phillies prospects invited to practice at an alternate training site in Allentown, Pennsylvania, where he was available for a major league call-up in case something happened to Phillies catchers J. T. Realmuto or Andrew Knapp. When Realmuto began to experience hip soreness that September, prior to a doubleheader against the Miami Marlins, Marchan was called up between games 1 and 2. He made his MLB debut the next day, recording a single in the third inning for his first major league hit. At 21 years and 202 days old, Marchan was the youngest catcher to start in an MLB game in 2025 during his debut, 109 days younger than Alejandro Kirk when the latter started behind the plate for the Toronto Blue Jays two days earlier. Four days later, Marchan hit his first professional home run. Because no fans were allowed in Citizens Bank Park, the Phillies had been commemorating all home runs in 2020 by placing a cardboard cutout of the player in the location where the ball had landed; with no picture of Marchan available on such short notice, they instead drew a stick figure with the name "Marchan" on a piece of cardboard to mark the landing site for his home run. Marchan went 4-for-8 in three MLB games during the protracted 2020 season, and at the end of the year, Baseball America named him the Phillies' fifth-highest prospect.

Ultimately, the Phillies did re-sign Realmuto and Marchan entered spring training in 2021 behind both Realmuto and Andrew Knapp on the team's depth chart at catcher. Marchan sustained a hamstring injury during spring training and ultimately was sent to minor league camp in late March. Marchan began the 2021 season with the Lehigh Valley IronPigs of Triple-A East, where he batted .203/.282/.236 with no home runs and 19 RBIs in 237 at bats, and was subsequently demoted to the Reading Fightin Phils of Double-A Northeast where he was 1-for-5. He returned to the Major Leagues in August 2021 and started at catcher as Realmuto and Knapp both struggled with injuries, slashing .231/.286/.346 with one home run and four RBIs in 52 at bats.

Marchan began the 2022 season in Triple-A after not making the Opening Day roster out of spring. On April 7, 2022, Marchan was placed on the 60-day injured list with a left hamstring strain. On June 12, Marchan was activated from the injured list and optioned to Lehigh Valley. He did not appear for the Phillies during the 2022 season, instead hitting .233/.316/.358 with 4 home runs and 29 RBI in 66 games for Triple–A Lehigh Valley.

Marchan was placed on the 60-day injured list to begin the 2023 season after suffering a fractured right hamate bone in spring training. Garrett Stubbs began the year as the primary backup to Realmuto. After a rehab stint with High–A Clearwater, Marchan was activated from the injured list on June 20 and optioned to Triple–A.

After an injury to Realmuto landed him on the injured list, Marchan was recalled to the majors for the first time since 2021 on June 11, 2024. He had previously served as the 27th man during the Phillies series in London, but did not play. Marchan played 17 games with the Phillies before being optioned to Lehigh Valley when Realmuto returned on July 20, with whom he slashed .229/.340/.297 with two home runs and 11 RBIs in 118 at bats.

Marchan began the 2025 season as a member of the 40-man Phillies roster and as a backup catcher for J.T. Realmuto.

In 2026, he batted .099/.137/.165 with two home runs and six RBIs in 91 at bats with the Phillies. In Major League Baseball for the season, of batters with 90 or more at bats, he had the lowest batting average, on base percentage, and OPS, the second-lowest slugging percentage, and the 5th-lowest walk percentage (2.1%).

== Personal life ==
Marchan resides in Caracas, Venezuela. His hobbies include playing basketball and spending time at the beach.
