= 2021 Arizona Diamondbacks season =

2021 Arizona Diamondbacks
- League: National League
- Division: West
- Ballpark: Chase Field
- City: Phoenix, Arizona
- Record: 52–110 (.321)
- Divisional place: 5th
- Owners: Ken Kendrick
- General managers: Mike Hazen
- Managers: Torey Lovullo
- Television: Bally Sports Arizona (Steve Berthiaume, Bob Brenly, Greg Schulte)
- Radio: KMVP-FM (98.7) (Greg Schulte, Tom Candiotti, Mike Ferrin); KHOV-FM (105.1, Spanish)
- Stats: ESPN.com; Baseball Reference

The 2021 Arizona Diamondbacks season was their 23rd season in Major League Baseball and also 23rd season at Chase Field in Phoenix, Arizona as members of the National League West. They were managed by Torey Lovullo in his fifth season with the franchise.

The Diamondbacks suffered a massive losing skid over 45 games from the 29th game against the Marlins to the 73rd game against the Dodgers that saw them only win 5 games that plunged their record from a 15–13 start to a 20–53 record including a franchise record 17-game losing streak. On June 17, 2021, with a 10–3 loss to the Giants, the team broke a dubious record of most consecutive road losses in the modern era, with 23 (which would later reach 24, equaling the all-time record of the 1889 Louisville Colonels). The MLB record was previously held by the 1943 Philadelphia Athletics and the 1963 New York Mets. One day later, they set a franchise record with their fifteenth consecutive loss, home or away. That streak would end at 17.

On August 14, 2021, Tyler Gilbert threw the third no-hitter in Diamondbacks history. This was his first Major League start, and the second no-hitter thrown at Chase Field. The Diamondbacks finished the 2021 season in fifth place in the National League West, with a 52–110 record, one game shy of tying their franchise-worst 2004 season, 51–111.

== Season standings ==
=== National League West ===
NL West
| Team | W | L | Pct. | GB | Home | Road |
|---|---|---|---|---|---|---|
| San Francisco Giants | 107 | 55 | .660 | — | 54‍–‍27 | 53‍–‍28 |
| Los Angeles Dodgers | 106 | 56 | .654 | 1 | 58‍–‍23 | 48‍–‍33 |
| San Diego Padres | 79 | 83 | .488 | 28 | 45‍–‍36 | 34‍–‍47 |
| Colorado Rockies | 74 | 87 | .460 | 32½ | 48‍–‍33 | 26‍–‍54 |
| Arizona Diamondbacks | 52 | 110 | .321 | 55 | 32‍–‍49 | 20‍–‍61 |

=== National League Wild Card ===
Division leaders
| Team | W | L | Pct. |
|---|---|---|---|
| San Francisco Giants | 107 | 55 | .660 |
| Milwaukee Brewers | 95 | 67 | .586 |
| Atlanta Braves | 88 | 73 | .547 |

Wild Card teams (Top 2 teams qualify for postseason)
| Team | W | L | Pct. | GB |
|---|---|---|---|---|
| Los Angeles Dodgers | 106 | 56 | .654 | +16 |
| St. Louis Cardinals | 90 | 72 | .556 | — |
| Cincinnati Reds | 83 | 79 | .512 | 7 |
| Philadelphia Phillies | 82 | 80 | .506 | 8 |
| San Diego Padres | 79 | 83 | .488 | 11 |
| New York Mets | 77 | 85 | .475 | 13 |
| Colorado Rockies | 74 | 87 | .460 | 15½ |
| Chicago Cubs | 71 | 91 | .438 | 19 |
| Miami Marlins | 67 | 95 | .414 | 23 |
| Washington Nationals | 65 | 97 | .401 | 25 |
| Pittsburgh Pirates | 61 | 101 | .377 | 29 |
| Arizona Diamondbacks | 52 | 110 | .321 | 38 |

== Record vs. opponents ==
2021 National League record Source: MLB Standings Grid – 2021
| Team | AZ | ATL | CHC | CIN | COL | LAD | MIA | MIL | NYM | PHI | PIT | SD | SF | STL | WSH | AL |
|---|---|---|---|---|---|---|---|---|---|---|---|---|---|---|---|---|
| Arizona | — | 3–4 | 2–4 | 5–1 | 9–10 | 3–16 | 2–5 | 1–6 | 1–5 | 4–3 | 4–2 | 8–11 | 2–17 | 1–6 | 3–4 | 4–16 |
| Atlanta | 4–3 | — | 5–2 | 4–3 | 2–4 | 2–4 | 11–8 | 3–3 | 10–9 | 10–9 | 4–3 | 4–2 | 3–3 | 6–1 | 14–5 | 6–14 |
| Chicago | 4–2 | 2–5 | — | 8–11 | 3–3 | 4–3 | 1–5 | 4–15 | 4–3 | 2–5 | 14–5 | 5–1 | 1–6 | 9–10 | 4–3 | 6–14 |
| Cincinnati | 1–5 | 3–4 | 11–8 | — | 5–2 | 3–3 | 5–2 | 9–10 | 3–3 | 4–2 | 13–6 | 1–6 | 1–6 | 10–9 | 5–2 | 9–11 |
| Colorado | 10–9 | 4–2 | 3–3 | 2–5 | — | 6–13 | 4–2 | 2–5 | 2–5 | 5–2 | 4–2 | 11–8 | 4–15 | 3–4 | 4–2 | 10–10 |
| Los Angeles | 16–3 | 4–2 | 3–4 | 3–3 | 13–6 | — | 3–4 | 4–3 | 6–1 | 4–2 | 6–0 | 12–7 | 9–10 | 4–3 | 7–0 | 12–8 |
| Miami | 5–2 | 8–11 | 5–1 | 2–5 | 2–4 | 4–3 | — | 3–3 | 9–10 | 10–9 | 2–5 | 3–4 | 3–4 | 0–6 | 8–11 | 3–17 |
| Milwaukee | 6–1 | 3–3 | 15–4 | 10–9 | 5–2 | 3–4 | 3–3 | — | 4–2 | 2–5 | 14–5 | 5–2 | 4–3 | 8–11 | 5–1 | 8–12 |
| New York | 5–1 | 9–10 | 3–4 | 3–3 | 5–2 | 1–6 | 10–9 | 2–4 | — | 9–10 | 3–4 | 4–3 | 1–5 | 2–5 | 11–8 | 9–11 |
| Philadelphia | 3–4 | 9–10 | 5–2 | 2–4 | 2–5 | 2–4 | 9–10 | 5–2 | 10–9 | — | 4–3 | 4–2 | 2–4 | 4–3 | 13–6 | 8–12 |
| Pittsburgh | 2–4 | 3–4 | 5–14 | 6–13 | 2–4 | 0–6 | 5–2 | 5–14 | 4–3 | 3–4 | — | 3–4 | 4–3 | 7–12 | 2–4 | 10–10 |
| San Diego | 11–8 | 2–4 | 1–5 | 6–1 | 8–11 | 7–12 | 4–3 | 2–5 | 3–4 | 2–4 | 4–3 | — | 8–11 | 3–3 | 4–3 | 14–6 |
| San Francisco | 17–2 | 3–3 | 6–1 | 6–1 | 15–4 | 10–9 | 4–3 | 3–4 | 5–1 | 4–2 | 3–4 | 11–8 | — | 2–4 | 5–2 | 13–7 |
| St. Louis | 6–1 | 1–6 | 10–9 | 9–10 | 4–3 | 3–4 | 6–0 | 11–8 | 5–2 | 3–4 | 12–7 | 3–3 | 4–2 | — | 2–4 | 11–9 |
| Washington | 4–3 | 5–14 | 3–4 | 2–5 | 2–4 | 0–7 | 11–8 | 1–5 | 8–11 | 6–13 | 4–2 | 3–4 | 2–5 | 4–2 | — | 10–10 |

== Regular season ==
=== Game log ===
2021 Game Log: 52–110 (Home: 32–49; Away: 20–61)
April: 14–12 (Home: 5–4; Away: 9–8)

| # | Date | Opponent | Score | Win | Loss | Save | Attendance | Record | Streak |
|---|---|---|---|---|---|---|---|---|---|
| 1 | April 1 | @ Padres | 7–8 | Pagán (1–0) | **Young** (0–1) | Melancon (1) | 8,773 | 0–1 | L1 |
| 2 | April 2 | @ Padres | 2–4 | Pagán (2–0) | **Kelly** (0–1) | Melancon (2) | 10,350 | 0–2 | L2 |
| 3 | April 3 | @ Padres | 0–7 | Musgrove (1–0) | **C. Smith** (0–1) | Weathers (1) | 10,350 | 0–3 | L3 |
| 4 | April 4 | @ Padres | 3–1 | **Widener** (1–0) | Paddack (0–1) | **Devenski** (1) | 10,350 | 1–3 | W1 |
| 5 | April 6 | @ Rockies | 10–8 (13) | **Peacock** (1–0) | Bowden (0–1) | — | 10,240 | 2–3 | W2 |
| 6 | April 7 | @ Rockies | 0–8 | Senzatela (1–1) | **Bumgarner** (0–1) | — | 12,894 | 2–4 | L1 |
| 7 | April 8 | @ Rockies | 3–7 | Gray (1–0) | **Kelly** (0–2) | Bard (2) | 10,836 | 2–5 | L2 |
| 8 | April 9 | Reds | 5–6 (10) | Pérez (1–0) | **Young** (0–2) | Garrett (2) | 19,385 | 2–6 | L3 |
| 9 | April 10 | Reds | 8–3 | **R. Smith** (1–0) | Hoffman (1–0) | — | 13,208 | 3–6 | W1 |
| 10 | April 11 | Reds | 7–0 | **Weaver** (1–0) | De León (0–1) | — | 10,981 | 4–6 | W2 |
| 11 | April 12 | Athletics | 5–9 | Bassitt (1–2) | **Bumgarner** (0–2) | — | 8,768 | 4–7 | L1 |
| 12 | April 13 | Athletics | 5–7 | Petit (3–0) | **Swarzak** (0–1) | Trivino (1) | 7,010 | 4–8 | L2 |
| 13 | April 15 | @ Nationals | 11–6 | **Kelly** (1–2) | Corbin (0–2) | — | 6,666 | 5–8 | W1 |
| 14 | April 16 | @ Nationals | 0–1 | Hand (1–0) | **Young** (0–3) | — | 8,056 | 5–9 | L1 |
| 15 | April 17 | @ Nationals | 2–6 | Fedde (1–1) | **Weaver** (1–1) | — | 8,305 | 5–10 | L2 |
| 16 | April 18 | @ Nationals | 5–2 | **Bumgarner** (1–2) | Espino (0–1) | **Crichton** (1) | 8,478 | 6–10 | W1 |
| — | April 20 | @ Reds | Suspended (Rain, continuation date: April 21) | | | | | | |
| 17 | April 21 (1) | @ Reds | 5–4 | **Bukauskas** (1–0) | Garrett (0–1) | **Crichton** (2) | 8,085 | 7–10 | W2 |
| 18 | April 21 (2) | @ Reds | 8–5 (10) | **Clarke** (1–0) | Pérez (1–2) | — | 8,025 | 8–10 | W3 |
| 19 | April 22 | @ Reds | 14–11 (10) | **C. Smith** (1–1) | Sims (0–1) | — | 7,549 | 9–10 | W4 |
| 20 | April 23 | @ Braves | 4–5 | Ynoa (1–1) | **Weaver** (1–2) | Smith (4) | 19,258 | 9–11 | L1 |
| — | April 24 | @ Braves | Postponed (Rain, makeup date: April 25) | | | | | | |
| 21 | April 25 (1) | @ Braves | 5–0 (7) | **Gallen** (1–0) | Wilson (1–1) | — | N/A | 10–11 | W1 |
| 22 | April 25 (2) | @ Braves | 7–0 (7) | **Bumgarner** (2–2) | Smyly (0–1) | — | 20,693 | 11–11 | W2 |
| 23 | April 27 | Padres | 5–1 | **Kelly** (2–2) | Paddack (1–3) | — | 10,486 | 12–11 | W3 |
| 24 | April 28 | Padres | 3–12 | Northcraft (1–0) | **R. Smith** (1–1) | — | 9,495 | 12–12 | L1 |
| 25 | April 29 | Rockies | 5–3 | **C. Smith** (2–1) | Stephenson (0–1) | **Crichton** (3) | 6,843 | 13–12 | W1 |
| 26 | April 30 | Rockies | 7–2 | **Bumgarner** (3–2) | Gray (3–2) | — | 13,184 | 14–12 | W2 |

May: 5–24 (Home: 5–11; Away: 0–13)

| # | Date | Opponent | Score | Win | Loss | Save | Attendance | Record | Streak |
|---|---|---|---|---|---|---|---|---|---|
| 27 | May 1 | Rockies | 6–14 | Gomber (2–3) | **Gallen** (1–1) | — | 15,734 | 14–13 | L1 |
| 28 | May 2 | Rockies | 8–4 | **Devenski** (1–0) | Bard (1–2) | — | 11,395 | 15–13 | W1 |
| 29 | May 4 | @ Marlins | 3–9 | Bleier (2–0) | **Ginkel** (0–1) | — | 3,893 | 15–14 | L1 |
| 30 | May 5 | @ Marlins | 0–8 | Holloway (1–0) | **Weaver** (1–3) | — | 3,573 | 15–15 | L2 |
| 31 | May 6 | @ Marlins | 1–3 | Floro (2–1) | **Bukauskas** (1–1) | García (5) | 4,049 | 15–16 | L3 |
| 32 | May 7 | @ Mets | 4–5 (10) | Loup (1–0) | **Crichton** (0–1) | — | 7,662 | 15–17 | L4 |
| 33 | May 8 | @ Mets | 2–4 | Lucchesi (1–2) | **Kelly** (2–3) | May (1) | 7,908 | 15–18 | L5 |
| 34 | May 9 | @ Mets | 2–4 | deGrom (3–2) | **R. Smith** (1–2) | Díaz (5) | 7,880 | 15–19 | L6 |
| 35 | May 10 | Marlins | 5–2 | **Weaver** (2–3) | Holloway (1–1) | **Crichton** (4) | 6,307 | 16–19 | W1 |
| 36 | May 11 | Marlins | 11–3 | **Bumgarner** (4–2) | López (0–3) | — | 5,560 | 17–19 | W2 |
| 37 | May 12 | Marlins | 2–3 | Poteet (1–0) | **Peacock** (1–1) | García (6) | 5,714 | 17–20 | L1 |
| 38 | May 13 | Marlins | 1–5 | Rogers (5–2) | **Kelly** (2–4) | — | 5,967 | 17–21 | L2 |
| 39 | May 14 | Nationals | 2–17 | Scherzer (3–2) | **R. Smith** (1–3) | — | 11,907 | 17–22 | L3 |
| 40 | May 15 | Nationals | 11–4 | **Young** (1–3) | Ross (2–3) | — | 13,462 | 18–22 | W1 |
| 41 | May 16 | Nationals | 0–3 | Fedde (3–4) | **Crichton** (0–2) | Hand (4) | 11,619 | 18–23 | L1 |
| 42 | May 17 | @ Dodgers | 1–3 | Buehler (2–0) | **Bumgarner** (4–3) | Jansen (8) | 14,088 | 18–24 | L2 |
| 43 | May 18 | @ Dodgers | 1–9 | Urías (6–1) | **Martin** (0–1) | — | 15,313 | 18–25 | L3 |
| 44 | May 19 | @ Dodgers | 2–4 | Kelly (1–0) | **Mantiply** (0–1) | Jansen (9) | 15,586 | 18–26 | L4 |
| 45 | May 20 | @ Dodgers | 2–3 | González (1–0) | **Kelly** (2–5) | Jansen (10) | 16,105 | 18–27 | L5 |
| 46 | May 21 | @ Rockies | 1–7 | Márquez (3–4) | **Frankoff** (0–1) | — | 18,158 | 18–28 | L6 |
| 47 | May 22 | @ Rockies | 6–7 | Kinley (1–0) | **Bumgarner** (4–4) | Bard (5) | 20,183 | 18–29 | L7 |
| 48 | May 23 | @ Rockies | 3–4 | Bard (2–3) | **Crichton** (0–3) | — | 19,221 | 18–30 | L8 |
| 49 | May 25 | Giants | 0–8 | Gausman (5–0) | **Martin** (0–2) | — | 10,311 | 18–31 | L9 |
| 50 | May 26 | Giants | 4–5 | Tropeano (1–0) | **Young** (1–4) | Rogers (6) | 8,597 | 18–32 | L10 |
| 51 | May 27 | Cardinals | 4–5 (10) | Reyes (3–1) | **Crichton** (0–4) | Ponce de Leon (1) | 8,951 | 18–33 | L11 |
| 52 | May 28 | Cardinals | 6–8 | Woodford (1–0) | **Bumgarner** (4–5) | Ponce de Leon (2) | 11,581 | 18–34 | L12 |
| 53 | May 29 | Cardinals | 4–7 | Wainwright (3–4) | **Frankoff** (0–2) | Reyes (15) | 17,834 | 18–35 | L13 |
| 54 | May 30 | Cardinals | 9–2 | **Peacock** (2–1) | Kim (1–3) | **R. Smith** (1) | 16,681 | 19–35 | W1 |
| 55 | May 31 | Mets | 2–6 | deGrom (4–2) | **Kelly** (2–6) | — | 11,309 | 19–36 | L1 |

June: 3–24 (Home: 2–9; Away: 1–15)

| # | Date | Opponent | Score | Win | Loss | Save | Attendance | Record | Streak |
|---|---|---|---|---|---|---|---|---|---|
| 56 | June 1 | Mets | 6–5 (10) | **Young** (2–4) | May (2–2) | — | 9,590 | 20–36 | W1 |
| 57 | June 2 | Mets | 6–7 | Castro (2–1) | **Soria** (0–1) | Díaz (10) | 9,810 | 20–37 | L1 |
| 58 | June 3 | @ Brewers | 4–7 | Suter (6–3) | **Duplantier** (0–1) | Hader (13) | 12,392 | 20–38 | L2 |
| 59 | June 4 | @ Brewers | 1–5 | Peralta (6–1) | **Peacock** (2–2) | — | 15,261 | 20–39 | L3 |
| 60 | June 5 | @ Brewers | 5–7 | Williams (2–0) | **Soria** (0–2) | Hader (14) | 20,073 | 20–40 | L4 |
| 61 | June 6 | @ Brewers | 0–2 | Burnes (3–4) | **C. Smith** (2–2) | Boxberger (2) | 20,117 | 20–41 | L5 |
| 62 | June 8 | @ Athletics | 2–5 | Bassitt (6–2) | **Duplantier** (0–2) | Trivino (9) | 3,695 | 20–42 | L6 |
| 63 | June 9 | @ Athletics | 0–4 | Manaea (5–2) | **Peacock** (2–3) | — | 4,090 | 20–43 | L7 |
| 64 | June 11 | Angels | 5–6 | Iglesias (4–2) | **Buchter** (0–1) | Claudio (1) | 18,458 | 20–44 | L8 |
| 65 | June 12 | Angels | 7–8 | Claudio (1–1) | **Soria** (0–3) | Iglesias (11) | 13,863 | 20–45 | L9 |
| 66 | June 13 | Angels | 3–10 | Sandoval (1–2) | **Duplantier** (0–3) | — | 12,768 | 20–46 | L10 |
| 67 | June 14 | @ Giants | 2–5 | Wood (6–3) | **Peacock** (2–4) | McGee (13) | 9,906 | 20–47 | L11 |
| 68 | June 15 | @ Giants | 8–9 | Sherfy (1–0) | **Castellanos** (0–1) | Rogers (9) | 9,867 | 20–48 | L12 |
| 69 | June 16 | @ Giants | 7–13 | DeSclafani (7–2) | **Kelly** (2–7) | — | 11,004 | 20–49 | L13 |
| 70 | June 17 | @ Giants | 3–10 | Gausman (8–1) | **Gallen** (1–2) | — | 13,144 | 20–50 | L14 |
| 71 | June 18 | Dodgers | 0–3 | Bauer (7–5) | **Mantiply** (0–2) | Jansen (17) | 25,356 | 20–51 | L15 |
| 72 | June 19 | Dodgers | 3–9 | Buehler (7–0) | **Peacock** (2–5) | — | 29,904 | 20–52 | L16 |
| 73 | June 20 | Dodgers | 8–9 | Cleavinger (2–3) | **Young** (2–5) | Jansen (18) | 31,661 | 20–53 | L17 |
| 74 | June 21 | Brewers | 5–1 | **Kelly** (3–7) | Anderson (2–5) | — | 9,804 | 21–53 | W1 |
| 75 | June 22 | Brewers | 0–5 | Peralta (7–2) | **Gallen** (1–3) | — | 9,358 | 21–54 | L1 |
| 76 | June 23 | Brewers | 2–3 | Woodruff (6–3) | **C. Smith** (2–3) | Hader (19) | 8,676 | 21–55 | L2 |
| 77 | June 25 | @ Padres | 5–11 | Ramirez (1–1) | **Martin** (0–3) | — | 32,583 | 21–56 | L3 |
| 78 | June 26 | @ Padres | 10–1 | **Kelly** (4–7) | Lamet (2–3) | — | 40,557 | 22–56 | W1 |
| 79 | June 27 | @ Padres | 4–5 | Hill (5–3) | **Peacock** (2–6) | Melancon (24) | 34,905 | 22–57 | L1 |
| 80 | June 28 | @ Cardinals | 1–7 | Gallegos (5–1) | **Young** (2–6) | — | 27,175 | 22–58 | L2 |
| 81 | June 29 | @ Cardinals | 2–3 | Martínez (4–9) | **C. Smith** (2–4) | Reyes (19) | 28,740 | 22–59 | L3 |
| 82 | June 30 | @ Cardinals | 4–7 | Kim (2–5) | **R. Smith** (1–4) | Reyes (20) | 27,235 | 22–60 | L4 |

July: 11–12 (Home: 8–7; Away: 3–5)

| # | Date | Opponent | Score | Win | Loss | Save | Attendance | Record | Streak |
|---|---|---|---|---|---|---|---|---|---|
| 83 | July 1 | Giants | 5–3 | **Kelly** (5–7) | Cueto (6–4) | **Soria** (1) | 9,172 | 23–60 | W1 |
| 84 | July 2 | Giants | 4–11 | Wood (7–3) | **Gallen** (1–4) | — | 12,262 | 23–61 | L1 |
| 85 | July 3 | Giants | 5–6 | Leone (2–0) | **Buchter** (0–2) | McGee (16) | 23,689 | 23–62 | L2 |
| 86 | July 4 | Giants | 2–5 | DeSclafani (9–3) | **C. Smith** (2–5) | Rogers (10) | 27,032 | 23–63 | L3 |
| 87 | July 6 | Rockies | 4–3 | **Soria** (1–3) | Bard (4–5) | — | 6,847 | 24–63 | W1 |
| 88 | July 7 | Rockies | 6–4 | **Peacock** (3–6) | Senzatela (2–8) | **Soria** (2) | 7,852 | 25–63 | W2 |
| 89 | July 8 | Rockies | 3–9 | Gonzalez (3–5) | **Weems** (0–1) | — | 7,740 | 25–64 | L1 |
| 90 | July 9 | @ Dodgers | 5–2 | **de Geus** (1–0) | Nuñez (0–1) | **Soria** (3) | 49,215 | 26–64 | W1 |
| 91 | July 10 | @ Dodgers | 1–22 | Buehler (9–1) | **C. Smith** (2–6) | — | 44,654 | 26–65 | L1 |
| 92 | July 11 | @ Dodgers | 4–7 | Jansen (1–2) | **Bukauskas** (1–2) | — | 40,464 | 26–66 | L2 |
| – | July 13 | **91st All-Star Game in Denver, CO** | | | | | | | |
| 93 | July 16 | Cubs | 1–5 | Hendricks (12–4) | **Bumgarner** (4–6) | — | 22,046 | 26–67 | L3 |
| 94 | July 17 | Cubs | 2–4 | Brothers (3–2) | **Soria** (1–4) | Kimbrel (21) | 20,180 | 26–68 | L4 |
| 95 | July 18 | Cubs | 6–4 | **Kelly** (6–7) | Winkler (1–2) | **Soria** (4) | 21,457 | 27–68 | W1 |
| 96 | July 19 | Pirates | 4–2 | **C. Smith** (3–6) | De Jong (1–4) | **Soria** (5) | 9,173 | 28–68 | W2 |
| 97 | July 20 | Pirates | 11–6 | **Bukauskas** (2–2) | Davis (0–1) | — | 7,283 | 29–68 | W3 |
| 98 | July 21 | Pirates | 6–4 | **de Geus** (2–0) | Underwood Jr. (2–3) | **Soria** (6) | 7,863 | 30–68 | W4 |
| 99 | July 23 | @ Cubs | 3–8 | Davies (6–6) | **Gallen** (1–5) | Thompson (1) | 34,059 | 30–69 | L1 |
| 100 | July 24 | @ Cubs | 7–3 | **Kelly** (7–7) | Chafin (0–2) | — | 37,190 | 31–69 | W1 |
| 101 | July 25 | @ Cubs | 1–5 | Williams (4–2) | **C. Smith** (3–7) | Kimbrel (23) | 32,602 | 31–70 | L1 |
| 102 | July 27 | @ Rangers | 4–5 | Dunning (4–7) | **Widener** (1–1) | Kennedy (16) | 27,336 | 31–71 | L2 |
| 103 | July 28 | @ Rangers | 3–2 | **Bumgarner** (5–6) | Martin (2–3) | **Clippard** (1) | 26,607 | 32–71 | W1 |
| 104 | July 30 | Dodgers | 6–5 (10) | **Peacock** (4–6) | Nelson (1–2) | — | 20,780 | 33–71 | W2 |
| 105 | July 31 | Dodgers | 3–8 | Vesia (1–1) | **Kelly** (7–8) | — | 23,814 | 33–72 | L1 |

August: 11–18 (Home: 7–7; Away: 4–11)

| # | Date | Opponent | Score | Win | Loss | Save | Attendance | Record | Streak |
|---|---|---|---|---|---|---|---|---|---|
| 106 | August 1 | Dodgers | 0–13 | Urías (13–3) | **C. Smith** (3–8) | — | 17,195 | 33–73 | L2 |
| 107 | August 2 | Giants | 8–11 (10) | García (3–2) | **Aguilar** (0–1) | — | 8,904 | 33–74 | L3 |
| 108 | August 3 | Giants | 3–1 | **Bumgarner** (6–6) | Cueto (7–6) | **Clippard** (2) | 8,809 | 34–74 | W1 |
| 109 | August 4 | Giants | 1–7 | Gausman (10–5) | **Gallen** (1–6) | — | 8,091 | 34–75 | L1 |
| 110 | August 5 | Giants | 4–5 (10) | Rogers (3–1) | **Gilbert** (0–1) | McGee (24) | 8,773 | 34–76 | L2 |
| 111 | August 6 | @ Padres | 8–5 | **Peacock** (5–6) | Weathers (4–4) | **Poppen** (1) | 34,038 | 35–76 | W1 |
| 112 | August 7 | @ Padres | 2–6 | Pomeranz (1–0) | **de Geus** (2–1) | — | 39,134 | 35–77 | L1 |
| 113 | August 8 | @ Padres | 0–2 | Snell (6–4) | **Bumgarner** (6–7) | Melancon (33) | 30,989 | 35–78 | L2 |
| 114 | August 10 | @ Giants | 7–8 | Littell (1–0) | **Peacock** (5–7) | — | 23,802 | 35–79 | L3 |
| 115 | August 11 | @ Giants | 2–7 | Gausman (11–5) | **Kelly** (7–9) | — | 20,037 | 35–80 | L5 |
| 116 | August 12 | Padres | 12–3 | **C. Smith** (4–8) | Darvish (7–7) | — | 9,086 | 36–80 | W1 |
| 117 | August 13 | Padres | 3–2 | **Clippard** (1–0) | Stammen (5–3) | — | 12,866 | 37–80 | W2 |
| 118 | August 14 | Padres | 7–0 | **Gilbert** (1–1) | Musgrove (8–8) | — | 16,716 | 38–80 | W3 |
| 119 | August 15 | Padres | 2–8 | Knehr (1–0) | **Gallen** (1–7) | — | 17,722 | 38–81 | L1 |
| 120 | August 17 | Phillies | 3–2 | **Aguilar** (1–1) | Gibson (8–5) | **Clippard** (3) | 7,796 | 39–81 | W1 |
| 121 | August 18 | Phillies | 4–2 | **Castellanos** (1–1) | Suárez (5–4) | **Clippard** (4) | 7,968 | 40–81 | W2 |
| 122 | August 19 | Phillies | 6–2 | **Bumgarner** (7–7) | Wheeler (10–8) | — | 7,165 | 41–81 | W3 |
| 123 | August 20 | @ Rockies | 4–9 | Stephenson (1–1) | **de Geus** (2–2) | — | 30,243 | 41–82 | L1 |
| 124 | August 21 | @ Rockies | 2–5 | Bard (7–5) | **Wendelken** (2–2) | — | 32,699 | 41–83 | L2 |
| 125 | August 22 | @ Rockies | 8–4 | **Widener** (2–1) | Gray (7–10) | — | 24,552 | 42–83 | W1 |
| 126 | August 23 | @ Pirates | 5–6 | Banda (2–0) | **Ramirez** (0–1) | Bednar (2) | 8,596 | 42–84 | L1 |
| 127 | August 24 | @ Pirates | 2–4 | Brubaker (5–13) | **Bumgarner** (7–8) | Stratton (2) | 8,478 | 42–85 | L2 |
| 128 | August 25 | @ Pirates | 5–2 | **de Geus** (3–2) | Banda (2–1) | **Clippard** (5) | 8,357 | 43–85 | W1 |
| 129 | August 26 | @ Phillies | 8–7 | **Gallen** (2–7) | Moore (2–4) | **Ramirez** (1) | 20,148 | 44–85 | W2 |
| 130 | August 27 | @ Phillies | 6–7 (11) | De Los Santos (1–1) | **Clarke** (1–1) | — | 23,181 | 44–86 | L1 |
| 131 | August 28 | @ Phillies | 0–7 | Gibson (10–5) | **Mejía** (0–1) | — | 24,692 | 44–87 | L2 |
| 132 | August 29 | @ Phillies | 4–7 | Suárez (6–4) | **Bumgarner** (7–9) | Kennedy (21) | 22,237 | 44–88 | L3 |
| 133 | August 30 | Padres | 5–7 | Stammen (6–3) | **Gilbert** (1–2) | Melancon (35) | 8,482 | 44–89 | L4 |
| 134 | August 31 | Padres | 0–3 | Snell (7–5) | **Gallen** (2–8) | Melancon (36) | 10,818 | 44–90 | L5 |

September: 6–19 (Home: 3–10; Away: 3–9)

| # | Date | Opponent | Score | Win | Loss | Save | Attendance | Record | Streak |
|---|---|---|---|---|---|---|---|---|---|
| 135 | September 1 | Padres | 8–3 | **Weaver** (3–3) | Darvish (7–9) | — | 5,945 | 45–90 | W1 |
| 136 | September 3 | Mariners | 5–6 (10) | Sheffield (7–8) | **Clarke** (1–2) | Ramírez (2) | 12,729 | 45–91 | L1 |
| 137 | September 4 | Mariners | 5–8 | Gonzales (7–5) | **C. Smith** (4–9) | Castillo (16) | 18,819 | 45–92 | L2 |
| 138 | September 5 | Mariners | 4–10 (10) | Ramírez (1–2) | **Clarke** (1–3) | — | 14,408 | 45–93 | L3 |
| 139 | September 7 | Rangers | 1–3 | Lyles (8–11) | **Gallen** (2–9) | — | 8,758 | 45–94 | L4 |
| 140 | September 8 | Rangers | 5–8 | Cotton (1–0) | **Weaver** (3–4) | Barlow (4) | 6,354 | 45–95 | L5 |
| 141 | September 10 | @ Mariners | 4–5 | Gonzales (8–5) | **Bumgarner** (7–10) | Steckenrider (8) | 14,379 | 45–96 | L6 |
| 142 | September 11 | @ Mariners | 7–3 | **Castellanos** (2–1) | Flexen (11–6) | — | 15,483 | 46–96 | W1 |
| 143 | September 12 | @ Mariners | 5–4 | **Gilbert** (2–2) | Misiewicz (4–5) | **Wendelken** (1) | 13,551 | 47–96 | W2 |
| 144 | September 13 | @ Dodgers | 1–5 | Bickford (4–2) | **Gallen** (2–10) | — | 43,273 | 47–97 | L1 |
| 145 | September 14 | @ Dodgers | 4–8 | Gonsolin (3–1) | **Weaver** (3–5) | — | 44,630 | 47–98 | L2 |
| 146 | September 15 | @ Dodgers | 3–5 | Urías (18–3) | **Kelly** (7–10) | Jansen (33) | 46,520 | 47–99 | L3 |
| 147 | September 17 | @ Astros | 3–4 (10) | Stanek (3–4) | **Clippard** (1–1) | — | 22,595 | 47–100 | L4 |
| 148 | September 18 | @ Astros | 6–4 (10) | **Wendelken** (3–2) | García (3–9) | **Clippard** (6) | 25,314 | 48–100 | W1 |
| 149 | September 19 | @ Astros | 6–7 | Solomon (1–0) | **Sittinger** (0–1) | Pressly (25) | 23,888 | 48–101 | L1 |
| 150 | September 20 | Braves | 4–11 | Webb (5–2) | **Mejía** (0–2) | — | 9,642 | 48–102 | L2 |
| 151 | September 21 | Braves | 1–6 | Smyly (10–4) | **Weaver** (3–6) | — | 8,879 | 48–103 | L3 |
| 152 | September 22 | Braves | 2–9 | Anderson (8–5) | **Kelly** (7–11) | — | 10,631 | 48–104 | L4 |
| 153 | September 23 | Braves | 6–4 | **Poppen** (1–0) | Webb (5–4) | **Wendelken** (2) | 6,880 | 49–104 | W1 |
| 154 | September 24 | Dodgers | 2–4 | Gonsolin (4–1) | **Castellanos** (2–2) | Jansen (35) | 19,001 | 49–105 | L1 |
| 155 | September 25 | Dodgers | 7–2 | **Gallen** (3–10) | Kershaw (10–8) | — | 28,026 | 50–105 | W1 |
| 156 | September 26 | Dodgers | 0–3 | Urías (19–3) | **Mejía** (0–3) | Jansen (36) | 16,648 | 50–106 | L1 |
| 157 | September 28 | @ Giants | 4–6 | Álvarez (5–2) | **Poppen** (1–1) | Doval (1) | 28,122 | 50–107 | L2 |
| 158 | September 29 | @ Giants | 0–1 | Leone (4–5) | **Ramirez** (0–2) | Doval (2) | 23,110 | 50–108 | L3 |
| 159 | September 30 | @ Giants | 4–5 | Rogers (7–1) | **Mantiply** (0–3) | — | 27,503 | 50–109 | L4 |

October: 2–1 (Home: 2–1; Away: 0–0)

| # | Date | Opponent | Score | Win | Loss | Save | Attendance | Record | Streak |
|---|---|---|---|---|---|---|---|---|---|
| 160 | October 1 | Rockies | 7–9 | Gilbreath (3–2) | **Wendelken** (3–3) | Estévez (11) | 15,189 | 50–110 | L5 |
| 161 | October 2 | Rockies | 11–2 | **Gallen** (4–10) | Senzatela (4–10) | — | 19,418 | 51–110 | W1 |
| 162 | October 3 | Rockies | 5–4 | **Wendelken** (4–3) | Estévez (3–5) | — | 12,565 | 52–110 | W2 |

Legend: = Win = Loss = Postponement
Bold = Diamondbacks team member

=== Opening day ===
Opening Day Starters
| Name | Position |
|---|---|
| Joshua Rojas | Shortstop |
| Ketel Marte | Center fielder |
| Christian Walker | First baseman |
| David Peralta | Left fielder |
| Asdrúbal Cabrera | Third baseman |
| Eduardo Escobar | Second baseman |
| Pavin Smith | Right fielder |
| Stephen Vogt | Catcher |
| Madison Bumgarner | Starting pitcher |

== Roster ==
2021 Arizona Diamondbacks
Roster
| Pitchers: 68 Miguel Aguilar; 52 Ryan Buchter; 33 J. B. Bukauskas; 40 Madison Bumgarner; 54 Humberto Castellanos; 45 Taylor Clarke; 36 Tyler Clippard; 58 Stefan Crichton; 56 Brett de Geus; 32 Chris Devenski; 34 Jon Duplantier; 55 Jake Faria; 61 Seth Frankoff; 65 Luis Frías; 23 Zac Gallen; 49 Tyler Gilbert; 37 Kevin Ginkel; 29 Merrill Kelly; 50 Yoan López; 35 Joe Mantiply; 25 Corbin Martin; 62 Humberto Mejía; 64 Keury Mella; 47 Matt Peacock; 64 Sean Poppen; 50 Noé Ramirez; 52 Brandyn Sittinger; 31 Caleb Smith; 46 Riley Smith; 48 Joakim Soria; 38 Anthony Swarzak; 24 Luke Weaver; 41 Jordan Weems; 48 J. B. Wendelken; 57 Taylor Widener; 49 Alex Young | Catchers: 28 Bryan Holaday; 18 Carson Kelly; 21 Stephen Vogt; Infielders: 13 Nick Ahmed; 28 Seth Beer; 14 Asdrúbal Cabrera; 27 Drew Ellis; 5 Eduardo Escobar; 16 Jake Hager; 1 Domingo Leyba; 27 Wyatt Mathisen; 2 Geraldo Perdomo; 10 Josh Rojas; 19 Josh VanMeter; 8 Ildemaro Vargas; 53 Christian Walker; 15 Andrew Young | Outfielders: 56 Kole Calhoun; 63 Stuart Fairchild; 9 Nick Heath; 16 Tim Locastro; 4 Ketel Marte; 30 Jake McCarthy; 6 David Peralta; 14 Henry Ramos; 22 Josh Reddick; 26 Pavin Smith; 12 Daulton Varsho | Manager: 17 Torey Lovullo; Coaches: -- Chris Cron (field coordinator); 43 Mike Fetters (bullpen); 7 Robby Hammock (quality control/catching); -- Drew Hedman (hitting); 70 Matt Herges (pitching); 39 Dave McKay (first base); 3 Tony Perezchica (third base); -- Jose Queliz (bullpen catcher); 84 Humberto Quintero (bullpen catcher); -- Rick Short (hitting); 60 Luis Urueta (bench); -- Gil Velazquez (defensive coordinator) |

== Player stats ==
=== Batting ===
Note: G = Games played; AB = At bats; R = Runs; H = Hits; 2B = Doubles; 3B = Triples; HR = Home runs; RBI = Runs batted in; SB = Stolen bases; BB = Walks; AVG = Batting average; SLG = Slugging average

| Player | G | AB | R | H | 2B | 3B | HR | RBI | SB | BB | AVG | SLG |
|---|---|---|---|---|---|---|---|---|---|---|---|---|
| Pavin Smith | 145 | 498 | 68 | 133 | 27 | 4 | 11 | 49 | 1 | 42 | .267 | .404 |
| David Peralta | 150 | 487 | 57 | 126 | 30 | 8 | 8 | 63 | 2 | 46 | .259 | .402 |
| Josh Rojas | 139 | 484 | 69 | 128 | 32 | 3 | 11 | 44 | 9 | 58 | .264 | .411 |
| Nick Ahmed | 129 | 434 | 46 | 96 | 30 | 3 | 5 | 38 | 7 | 34 | .221 | .339 |
| Christian Walker | 115 | 401 | 55 | 98 | 23 | 1 | 10 | 46 | 0 | 38 | .244 | .382 |
| Eduardo Escobar | 98 | 370 | 50 | 91 | 14 | 3 | 22 | 65 | 1 | 29 | .246 | .478 |
| Ketel Marte | 90 | 340 | 52 | 108 | 29 | 1 | 14 | 50 | 2 | 31 | .318 | .532 |
| Carson Kelly | 98 | 304 | 41 | 73 | 11 | 1 | 13 | 46 | 0 | 44 | .240 | .411 |
| Daulton Varsho | 95 | 284 | 41 | 70 | 17 | 2 | 11 | 38 | 6 | 30 | .246 | .437 |
| Asdrúbal Cabrera | 90 | 283 | 34 | 69 | 21 | 0 | 7 | 40 | 1 | 33 | .244 | .392 |
| Josh VanMeter | 112 | 274 | 26 | 58 | 17 | 2 | 6 | 36 | 3 | 33 | .212 | .354 |
| Kole Calhoun | 51 | 166 | 17 | 39 | 8 | 0 | 5 | 17 | 1 | 15 | .235 | .373 |
| Josh Reddick | 54 | 151 | 15 | 39 | 11 | 0 | 2 | 21 | 0 | 6 | .258 | .371 |
| Stephen Vogt | 52 | 132 | 17 | 28 | 6 | 1 | 5 | 17 | 0 | 18 | .212 | .386 |
| Tim Locastro | 55 | 118 | 11 | 21 | 2 | 0 | 1 | 5 | 5 | 6 | .178 | .220 |
| Andrew Young | 58 | 91 | 13 | 19 | 7 | 0 | 6 | 15 | 0 | 6 | .209 | .484 |
| Drew Ellis | 28 | 69 | 10 | 9 | 2 | 0 | 1 | 5 | 0 | 10 | .130 | .203 |
| Jake McCarthy | 24 | 59 | 11 | 13 | 3 | 0 | 2 | 4 | 3 | 8 | .220 | .373 |
| Henry Ramos | 18 | 50 | 5 | 10 | 2 | 0 | 1 | 8 | 0 | 4 | .200 | .300 |
| Ildemaro Vargas | 18 | 43 | 4 | 8 | 1 | 1 | 0 | 4 | 0 | 3 | .186 | .256 |
| Wyatt Mathisen | 23 | 42 | 3 | 5 | 0 | 0 | 1 | 8 | 0 | 5 | .119 | .190 |
| Nick Heath | 20 | 35 | 3 | 5 | 1 | 0 | 0 | 1 | 0 | 4 | .143 | .171 |
| Geraldo Perdomo | 11 | 31 | 5 | 8 | 3 | 1 | 0 | 1 | 0 | 6 | .258 | .419 |
| Bryan Holaday | 13 | 31 | 2 | 6 | 2 | 0 | 0 | 1 | 0 | 1 | .194 | .258 |
| Domingo Leyba | 13 | 22 | 0 | 0 | 0 | 0 | 0 | 0 | 0 | 2 | .000 | .000 |
| Jake Hager | 9 | 18 | 1 | 2 | 0 | 0 | 0 | 2 | 0 | 4 | .111 | .111 |
| Stuart Fairchild | 12 | 15 | 3 | 2 | 1 | 0 | 0 | 2 | 0 | 1 | .133 | .200 |
| Seth Beer | 5 | 9 | 4 | 4 | 1 | 0 | 1 | 3 | 0 | 1 | .444 | .889 |
| Pitcher totals | 162 | 248 | 16 | 29 | 7 | 0 | 1 | 15 | 2 | 19 | .117 | .157 |
| Team totals | 162 | 5489 | 679 | 1297 | 308 | 31 | 144 | 644 | 43 | 537 | .236 | .382 |

=== Pitching ===
Note: W = Wins; L = Losses; ERA = Earned run average; G = Games pitched; GS = Games started; SV = Saves; IP = Innings pitched; H = Hits allowed; R = Runs allowed; ER = Earned runs allowed; BB = Walks allowed; SO = Strikeouts

| Player | W | L | ERA | G | GS | SV | IP | H | R | ER | BB | SO |
|---|---|---|---|---|---|---|---|---|---|---|---|---|
| Merrill Kelly | 7 | 11 | 4.44 | 27 | 27 | 0 | 158.0 | 163 | 82 | 78 | 41 | 130 |
| Madison Bumgarner | 7 | 10 | 4.67 | 26 | 26 | 0 | 146.1 | 134 | 82 | 76 | 39 | 124 |
| Zac Gallen | 4 | 10 | 4.30 | 23 | 23 | 0 | 121.1 | 108 | 61 | 58 | 49 | 139 |
| Caleb Smith | 4 | 9 | 4.83 | 45 | 13 | 0 | 113.2 | 93 | 64 | 61 | 63 | 124 |
| Matt Peacock | 5 | 7 | 4.90 | 35 | 8 | 0 | 86.1 | 107 | 55 | 47 | 28 | 50 |
| Taylor Widener | 2 | 1 | 4.35 | 23 | 13 | 0 | 70.1 | 65 | 38 | 34 | 37 | 73 |
| Riley Smith | 1 | 4 | 6.01 | 24 | 6 | 1 | 67.1 | 86 | 46 | 45 | 15 | 36 |
| Luke Weaver | 3 | 6 | 4.25 | 13 | 13 | 0 | 65.2 | 58 | 34 | 31 | 20 | 62 |
| Humberto Castellanos | 2 | 2 | 4.93 | 14 | 7 | 0 | 45.2 | 48 | 26 | 25 | 15 | 29 |
| Taylor Clarke | 1 | 3 | 4.98 | 43 | 0 | 0 | 43.1 | 52 | 28 | 24 | 14 | 39 |
| Alex Young | 2 | 6 | 6.26 | 30 | 2 | 0 | 41.2 | 50 | 34 | 29 | 20 | 38 |
| Tyler Gilbert | 2 | 2 | 3.15 | 9 | 6 | 0 | 40.0 | 28 | 17 | 14 | 13 | 25 |
| Joe Mantiply | 0 | 3 | 3.40 | 57 | 0 | 0 | 39.2 | 45 | 24 | 15 | 17 | 38 |
| Noé Ramirez | 0 | 2 | 2.76 | 36 | 0 | 1 | 32.2 | 18 | 12 | 10 | 11 | 29 |
| Jake Faria | 0 | 0 | 5.51 | 23 | 3 | 0 | 32.2 | 39 | 21 | 20 | 13 | 32 |
| Joakim Soria | 1 | 4 | 4.30 | 31 | 0 | 6 | 29.1 | 31 | 14 | 14 | 8 | 31 |
| Kevin Ginkel | 0 | 1 | 6.35 | 32 | 0 | 0 | 28.1 | 30 | 24 | 20 | 14 | 31 |
| Tyler Clippard | 1 | 1 | 3.20 | 26 | 0 | 6 | 25.1 | 22 | 12 | 9 | 11 | 21 |
| Stefan Crichton | 0 | 4 | 7.33 | 31 | 0 | 4 | 23.1 | 33 | 22 | 19 | 12 | 17 |
| Brett de Geus | 3 | 2 | 6.56 | 28 | 0 | 0 | 23.1 | 31 | 22 | 17 | 12 | 15 |
| Humberto Mejía | 0 | 3 | 7.25 | 5 | 5 | 0 | 22.1 | 32 | 19 | 18 | 9 | 20 |
| J. B. Wendelken | 2 | 2 | 4.34 | 20 | 0 | 2 | 18.2 | 15 | 9 | 9 | 9 | 13 |
| Sean Poppen | 1 | 1 | 4.67 | 20 | 0 | 1 | 17.1 | 20 | 11 | 9 | 7 | 21 |
| JB Bukauskas | 2 | 2 | 7.79 | 21 | 0 | 0 | 17.1 | 24 | 19 | 15 | 7 | 14 |
| Ryan Buchter | 0 | 2 | 6.61 | 18 | 0 | 0 | 16.1 | 16 | 13 | 12 | 13 | 16 |
| Corbin Martin | 0 | 3 | 10.69 | 5 | 3 | 0 | 16.0 | 23 | 19 | 19 | 14 | 13 |
| Seth Frankoff | 0 | 2 | 9.20 | 4 | 3 | 0 | 14.2 | 20 | 15 | 15 | 9 | 11 |
| Jon Duplantier | 0 | 3 | 13.15 | 4 | 4 | 0 | 13.0 | 19 | 19 | 19 | 8 | 12 |
| Yoan López | 0 | 0 | 6.57 | 13 | 0 | 0 | 12.1 | 18 | 10 | 9 | 6 | 13 |
| Chris Devenski | 1 | 0 | 8.59 | 8 | 0 | 1 | 7.1 | 11 | 7 | 7 | 2 | 5 |
| Miguel Aguilar | 1 | 1 | 6.43 | 9 | 0 | 0 | 7.0 | 6 | 6 | 5 | 4 | 3 |
| Brandyn Sittinger | 0 | 1 | 7.71 | 5 | 0 | 0 | 4.2 | 5 | 4 | 4 | 2 | 1 |
| Anthony Swarzak | 0 | 1 | 9.64 | 6 | 0 | 0 | 4.2 | 7 | 5 | 5 | 1 | 4 |
| Luís Frías | 0 | 0 | 2.70 | 3 | 0 | 0 | 3.1 | 2 | 1 | 1 | 5 | 3 |
| Keury Mella | 0 | 0 | 32.40 | 2 | 0 | 0 | 1.2 | 8 | 6 | 6 | 2 | 2 |
| Asdrúbal Cabrera | 0 | 0 | 0.00 | 2 | 0 | 0 | 1.1 | 1 | 0 | 0 | 0 | 0 |
| Jordan Weems | 0 | 1 | 47.25 | 2 | 0 | 0 | 1.1 | 4 | 7 | 7 | 3 | 3 |
| Wyatt Mathisen | 0 | 0 | 0.00 | 1 | 0 | 0 | 1.0 | 1 | 0 | 0 | 0 | 0 |
| David Peralta | 0 | 0 | 27.00 | 1 | 0 | 0 | 1.0 | 4 | 3 | 3 | 0 | 1 |
| Bryan Holaday | 0 | 0 | 9.00 | 1 | 0 | 0 | 1.0 | 1 | 1 | 1 | 1 | 0 |
| Josh Reddick | 0 | 0 | 13.50 | 1 | 0 | 0 | 0.2 | 2 | 1 | 1 | 1 | 0 |
| Team totals | 52 | 110 | 5.11 | 162 | 162 | 22 | 1417.1 | 1480 | 893 | 804 | 555 | 1238 |

== Minor league affiliations ==
| Level | Team | League | Location | Manager |
|---|---|---|---|---|
| Triple-A | Reno Aces | Triple-A West | Reno, Nevada | Blake Lalli |
| Double-A | Amarillo Sod Poodles | Double-A Central | Amarillo, Texas | Shawn Roof |
| High-A | Hillsboro Hops | High-A West | Hillsboro, Oregon | Vince Harrison |
| Low-A | Visalia Rawhide | Low-A West | Visalia, California | Javier Colina |
| Rookie | ACL D-backs | Arizona Complex League | Scottsdale, Arizona | Rolando Arnedo |
| Rookie | DSL D-backs 1 | Dominican Summer League | Boca Chica, Santo Domingo | Jaime Del Valle |
| Rookie | DSL D-backs 2 | Dominican Summer League | Boca Chica, Santo Domingo | Ronald Ramirez |
