= Jason Vosler =

American baseball player (born 1993)

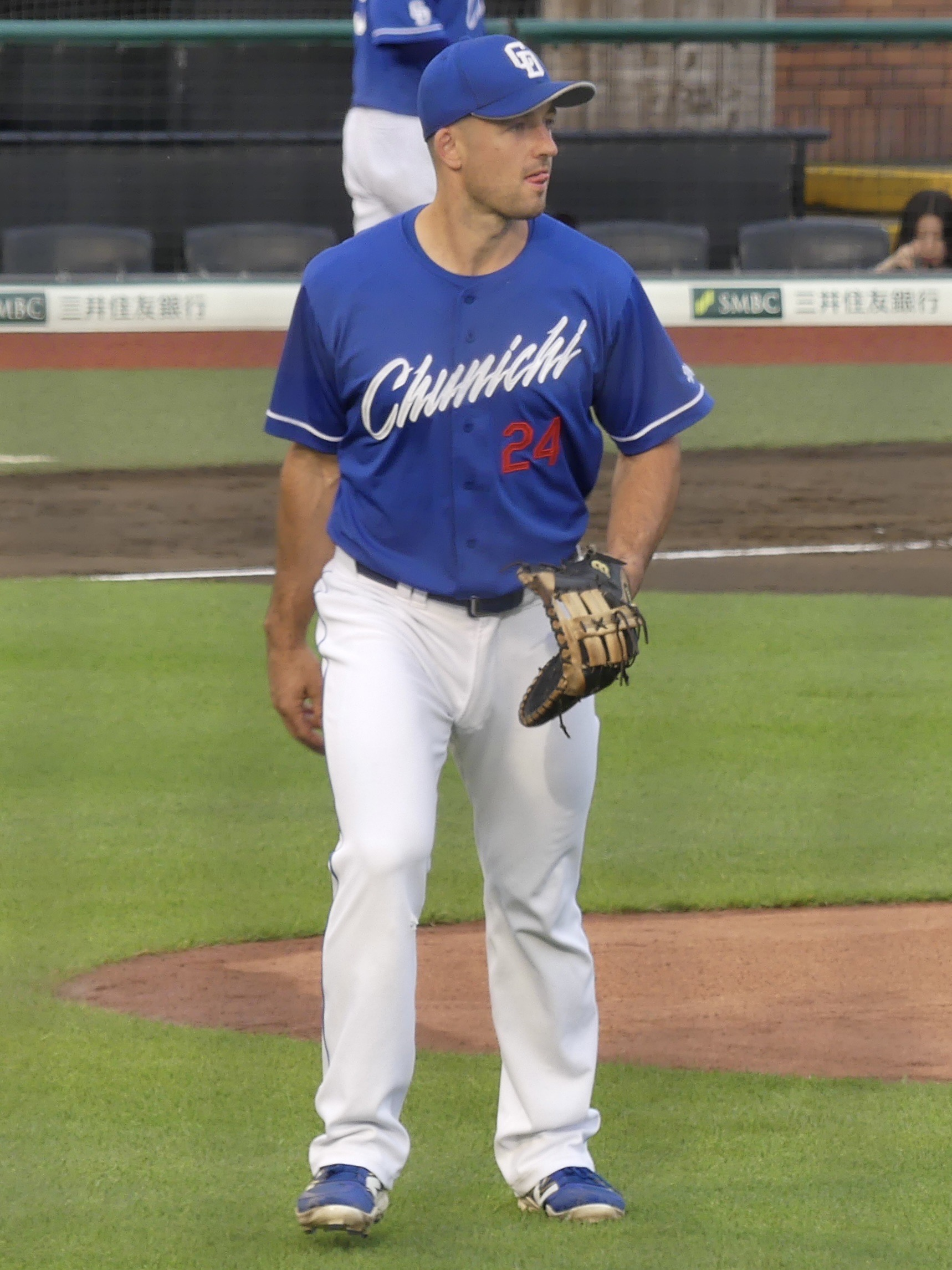
- Vosler with the Chunichi Dragons in 2025
- Infielder / Outfielder
- Born: September 6, 1993 (age 33); West Nyack, New York, U.S.
- Batted: Left Threw: Right

Professional debut
- MLB: April 24, 2021, for the San Francisco Giants
- NPB: April 14, 2025, for the Chunichi Dragons

Last appearance
- MLB: August 4, 2024, for the Seattle Mariners
- NPB: October 3, 2026, for the Chunichi Dragons

MLB statistics
- Batting average: .207
- Home runs: 10
- Runs batted in: 34

NPB statistics
- Batting average: .237
- Home runs: 20
- Runs batted in: 76
- Stats at Baseball Reference

Teams
- San Francisco Giants (2021–2022); Cincinnati Reds (2023); Seattle Mariners (2024); Chunichi Dragons (2025–2026)

Jason Glenn Vosler (born September 6, 1993) is an American former professional baseball third baseman and first baseman. He played in Major League Baseball (MLB) for the San Francisco Giants, Cincinnati Reds, and Seattle Mariners. Vosler played college baseball at Northeastern University, and was drafted by the Chicago Cubs in the 16th round of the 2014 Major League Baseball draft.

== Career ==
=== Amateur career ===
Vosler attended Don Bosco Preparatory High School in Ramsey, New Jersey. He played three years of varsity baseball at shortstop. He was second team All-League in 2010, and first team All-State, first team All-County, and first team All-League in 2011. In 2011 he batted .518 with 36 runs, 10 doubles, two triples, two homers and 35 RBI with 15 walks and four strikeouts in 106 plate appearances. He also played wing in varsity hockey.

Vosler attended Northeastern University, and played college baseball for the Northeastern Huskies for three seasons, batting .307/.369/.446. In 2012 he won the Colonial Athletic Association (CAA) Rookie of the Year award, and was an All-CAA Third Team selection at second base.

=== Chicago Cubs ===
He was drafted by the Chicago Cubs in the 16th round of the 2014 Major League Baseball draft, and signed. Vosler made his professional debut that year with the Boise Hawks, batting .266/.361/.372 with one home run and 11 RBIs in 30 games.

Vosler played for the South Bend Cubs and Myrtle Beach Pelicans in 2015 where hit a combined .238/.323/.374 with ten home runs and 40 RBIs in 107 games. In 2016 he played for Myrtle Beach and the Cubs Double-A affiliate, the Tennessee Smokies where he slashed .254/.323/.359 with three home runs and 51 RBIs in 119 games.

He returned to Tennessee in 2017, He batted .241/.343/.429 with 70 runs (7th in the league), 21 home runs (2nd), and 81 RBIs (2nd) in 452 at bats over 129 games. He was named a 2017 Southern League Mid-Season and Post-Season All Star, and a 2017 MiLB Organization All Star. After the 2017 season, he played in the Arizona Fall League, batting .210.

Vosler began the 2018 season with Tennessee and played in 66 games before being promoted to the Cubs Triple-A affiliate, the Iowa Cubs. In 2018, he hit a combined .251/.330/.467 with 23 home runs and 93 RBIs in 471 at bats while playing 129 games. He was named a 2018 Southern League mid-season All Star, and a 2018 MiLB Organization All Star.

=== San Diego Padres ===
On November 20, 2018, the Cubs traded Vosler to the San Diego Padres in exchange for pitcher Rowan Wick. He spent 2019 with the Triple–A El Paso Chihuahuas, slashing .290/.367/.523 with 20 home runs and 63 RBI in 375 at–bats over 116 games. This became his third consecutive year of hitting 20 or more home runs in a season.

Vosler did not play in a game in 2020 due to the cancellation of the Minor League Baseball season because of the COVID-19 pandemic. He became a free agent on November 2, 2020.

=== San Francisco Giants ===
On November 10, 2020, Vosler signed a major league contract with the San Francisco Giants. On April 24, 2021, Vosler was promoted to the major leagues for the first time. He made his MLB debut that day against the Miami Marlins as a pinch hitter for Kevin Gausman, popping out against Dylan Floro in his only at bat. On April 25, Vosler recorded his first MLB hit, a single off of Marlins pitcher Richard Bleier. On May 26, Vosler hit his first major league home run, a go-ahead solo homer off Alex Young of the Arizona Diamondbacks. In the 2021 regular season for the Giants he batted .178/.256/.356 with 12 runs, 3 home runs, and 9 RBI in 73 at–bats. He played 19 games at third base, 3 games at second base, 3 games at first base, 2 games in left field, and one game in right field. With the Triple–A Sacramento River Cats, he batted .295/.385/.529 with 51 runs, 15 home runs, and 51 RBI in 261 at–bats.

In 2022 with the Giants Vosler batted .265/.342/.469 in 98 at–bats, with 14 runs, four home runs, and 12 RBI. He played 29 games at third base, three in left field, two at first base, and one each at second base, shortstop, and right field. With Triple–A Sacramento, he batted .242/.311/.433 in 360 at–bats, with 18 home runs and 47 RBI. On November 15, 2022 Vosler was designated for assignment by the Giants after they protected multiple prospects from the Rule 5 draft. On November 18, he was non–tendered and became a free agent.

=== Cincinnati Reds ===
On January 25, 2023, Vosler signed a minor league contract with the Seattle Mariners organization. He was released just three days later on January 28.

On February 1, 2023, Vosler signed a minor league contract with the Cincinnati Reds organization. On March 30, Vosler had his contract selected after making the Opening Day roster. He appeared in 20 games for Cincinnati, hitting .161/.200/.371 with 3 home runs and 10 RBI. On April 24, Vosler was designated for assignment following the promotion of Henry Ramos. He cleared waivers and was sent outright to the Triple-A Louisville Bats on April 27. In 92 games for Louisville, Vosler batted .240/.333/.482 with 20 home runs and 68 RBI. He elected free agency following the season on November 6.

=== Seattle Mariners ===
On March 9, 2024, Vosler signed a minor league contract with the Seattle Mariners. In 89 games for the Triple–A Tacoma Rainiers, he batted .289/.357/.526 with 20 home runs and 79 RBI. On July 22, the Mariners selected Vosler's contract, adding him to their active roster. In 10 games for the Mariners, he went 5–for–28 (.179) with 3 RBI. Vosler was designated for assignment by Seattle on September 9. He cleared waivers and was sent outright to Tacoma on September 11. Vosler elected free agency on October 1.

=== Chunichi Dragons ===
On November 27, 2024, Vosler signed with the Chunichi Dragons of Nippon Professional Baseball.

On May 7, 2025, Vosler hit his first home run in Nippon Professional Baseball.

On October 24, 2026, Vosler announced his retirement from professional baseball and would transition into becoming an international scout for the Chunichi Dragons.
