= Riley Smith (baseball) =

American baseball player (born 1995)

- Pitcher
- Born: January 15, 1995 (age 31); Lufkin, Texas, U.S.
- Batted: Right Threw: Right

MLB debut
- August 26, 2020, for the Arizona Diamondbacks

Last MLB appearance
- July 25, 2021, for the Arizona Diamondbacks

MLB statistics
- Win–loss record: 3–4
- Earned run average: 5.04
- Strikeouts: 54
- Stats at Baseball Reference

Teams
- Arizona Diamondbacks (2020–2021)

Riley Wade Smith (born January 15, 1995) is an American former professional baseball pitcher. He played in Major League Baseball (MLB) for the Arizona Diamondbacks.

== Amateur career ==
Smith attended Hudson High School in Lufkin, Texas. Undrafted out of high school in 2013, Smith attended San Jacinto College for two years. He went 6–2 with a 2.30 ERA and 54 strikeouts over 70 innings in 2014. He posted a 7–2 record with a 2.96 ERA and 85 strikeouts over 75 innings in 2015. Smith helped lead the San Jacinto Gators to the NJCAA World Series in 2015. Smith was drafted by the Pittsburgh Pirates in the 31st round of the 2015 MLB draft, but did not sign and transferred to Louisiana State University for the 2016 season. Smith went 2–1 with a 7.22 ERA over 32 innings in 2016. Smith was drafted by the Arizona Diamondbacks in the 24th round, with the 719th overall selection, of the 2016 MLB draft and signed with them.

== Professional career ==
=== Arizona Diamondbacks ===
Smith spent his professional debut season of 2016 with the Hillsboro Hops, going 2–0 with a 2.51 ERA over 32 innings. He split the 2017 season between Hillsboro and the Kane County Cougars, going a combined 7–4 with a 3.07 ERA over 105 2/3 innings. He spent 2018 with the Visalia Rawhide, going 8–6 with a 3.57 ERA over 151 innings. He split the 2019 season between the Jackson Generals and the Reno Aces, going a combined 6–6 with a 4.43 ERA over 133 1/3 innings. On November 20, 2019, the Diamondbacks added Smith to their 40-man roster to protect him from the Rule 5 draft.

Smith was promoted to the major leagues for the first time on August 24, 2020. He made his debut on August 26 against the Colorado Rockies. In 6 games, Smith was 1–0 with a 1.47 ERA in 18 1/3 innings. Smith made 24 appearances for Arizona in 2021, but struggled to a 6.01 ERA with 36 strikeouts in 67 1/3 innings of work. He was outrighted off of the 40-man roster following the season on November 19, 2021. On April 12, 2022, Smith was released by the Diamondbacks organization.

=== Colorado Rockies ===
On May 2, 2022, Smith signed with the Wild Health Genomes of the Atlantic League of Professional Baseball. On May 9, the Colorado Rockies signed Smith to a minor league deal. He made 19 appearances (17 starts) for the Triple-A Albuquerque Isotopes, struggling to a 4–7 record and 8.06 ERA with 80 strikeouts in 92.2 innings pitched. He elected free agency following the season on November 10.

=== Cleburne Railroaders ===
On February 17, 2023, Smith signed with the Bravos de León of the Mexican League. However, prior to the start of the Mexican League season on April 5, Smith signed with the Cleburne Railroaders of the American Association of Professional Baseball. Smith made 8 starts for Cleburne, logging a 3–4 record and 5.73 ERA with 25 strikeouts in 44.0 innings pitched. On June 20, he was released by the Railroaders.

=== Cleveland Guardians ===
On June 23, 2023, Smith signed a minor league contract with the Cleveland Guardians organization. In two games for the Triple–A Columbus Clippers, he pitched five innings, allowing 13 runs (11 earned) on 12 hits and 12 walks with two strikeouts. On July 3, Smith retired from professional baseball.
