= Brett de Geus =

American baseball player (born 1997)

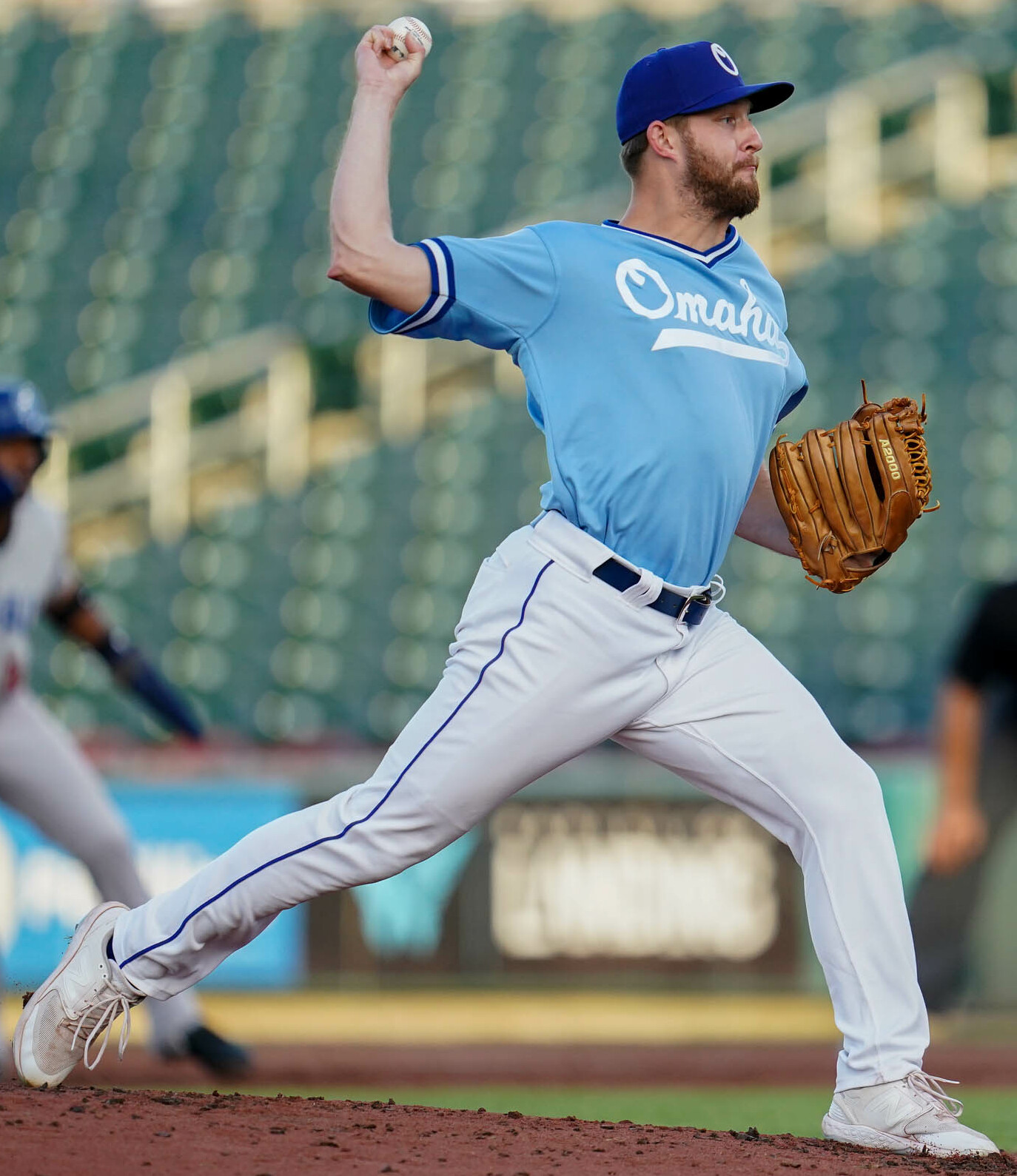
- de Geus with the Omaha Storm Chasers in 2023

Toros de Tijuana – No. 63
- Pitcher
- Born: November 4, 1997 (age 28); Pleasanton, California, U.S.
- Bats: Right Throws: Right

MLB debut
- April 1, 2021, for the Texas Rangers

MLB statistics (through 2025 season)
- Win–loss record: 3–4
- Earned run average: 7.39
- Strikeouts: 48
- Stats at Baseball Reference

Teams
- Texas Rangers (2021); Arizona Diamondbacks (2021); Seattle Mariners (2024); Miami Marlins (2024); Toronto Blue Jays (2024); Philadelphia Phillies (2025)

Brett de Geus (/dʌˈɡʌs/ duh-GUS; born November 4, 1997) is an American professional baseball pitcher for the Toros de Tijuana of the Mexican League. He has previously played in Major League Baseball (MLB) for the Texas Rangers, Arizona Diamondbacks, Seattle Mariners, Miami Marlins, Toronto Blue Jays, and Philadelphia Phillies.

== Amateur career ==
de Geus attended Foothill High School in Pleasanton, California. He was not selected in the 2015 Major League Baseball draft and thus enrolled at Cabrillo College in Aptos, California, where he played baseball. As a freshman at Cabrillo in 2016, de Geus earned all-conference honors. As a sophomore in 2017, he went 9–3 with a 1.94 ERA over 16 games, including 14 starts.

== Professional career ==
=== Los Angeles Dodgers ===
After the season, de Geus was selected by the Los Angeles Dodgers in the 33rd round, with the 1,000th overall selection, of the 2017 Major League Baseball draft. de Geus signed with the Dodgers and made his professional debut in 2018 with the Ogden Raptors, going 4–5 with a 7.26 ERA over 15 games (14 starts). In 2019, he began the year with the Great Lakes Loons before being promoted to the Rancho Cucamonga Quakes in June. Over 39 relief appearances between the two clubs, he pitched to a 6–2 record with a 1.75 ERA, striking out 72 over 61 2/3 innings. Following the season, he was selected to play in the Arizona Fall League, where he was named an All-Star.

de Geus was a non-roster invite to 2020 spring training, but he did not play in a game in 2020 due to the cancellation of the minor league season because of the COVID-19 pandemic.

=== Texas Rangers ===
On December 10, 2020, Texas Rangers selected de Geus with the second pick in the Rule 5 draft. He made the Rangers' Opening Day roster in 2021. On April 1, 2021, de Geus made his major league debut, surrendering three earned runs in one inning pitched. De Geus was designated for assignment on June 23, after posting a 8.44 ERA over 19 games for Texas.

=== Arizona Diamondbacks ===
On June 25, 2021, de Geus was claimed off waivers by the Arizona Diamondbacks. Over 28 relief appearances with the Diamondbacks, he went 3–2 with a 6.56 ERA and 15 strikeouts. On November 26, de Geus was designated for assignment. He cleared waivers and was sent outright to the Triple-A Reno Aces on November 30.

De Geus was assigned to the Double-A Amarillo Sod Poodles to begin the 2022 season. He made 17 appearances for the team, struggling to a 5.96 ERA and 2–1 record with 16 strikeouts in 22 2/3 innings pitched. On June 7, 2022, de Geus was released by the Diamondbacks organization.

=== York Revolution ===
On June 22, 2022, de Geus signed with the York Revolution of the Atlantic League of Professional Baseball (ALPB). In 33 games, he went 2–2 with a 6.43 ERA and 31 strikeouts in 35 innings. de Geus became a free agent following the season.

=== Frederick Atlantic League Team ===
On April 21, 2023, de Geus signed with the unnamed Frederick team in the ALPB. In five relief appearances for Frederick, de Geus registered a 3.00 ERA with six strikeouts in six innings pitched.

=== Kansas City Royals ===
On May 11, 2023, de Geus' contract was purchased by the Kansas City Royals and was assigned to the Triple-A Omaha Storm Chasers. In 29 appearances split between Omaha and the Double–A Northwest Arkansas Naturals, he accumulated a 4.86 ERA with 36 strikeouts across 46 1/3 innings pitched. de Geus elected free agency following the season on November 6.

=== Seattle Mariners ===
On December 3, 2023, de Geus signed a minor league deal with the Seattle Mariners. He made three appearances for the Triple–A Tacoma Rainiers before he was selected to the major league roster on April 8, 2024. He pitched four times for the Mariners, allowing one run in 3 1/3 innings pitched before being optioned back to Tacoma on April 22. de Geus was designated for assignment by Seattle on August 2.

=== Miami Marlins ===
On August 5, 2024, de Geus was claimed off waivers by the Miami Marlins and optioned to the Triple-A Jacksonville Jumbo Shrimp. In 7 games for Miami, he compiled a 6.35 ERA with 4 strikeouts over 5 2/3 innings pitched. De Geus was designated for assignment by the Marlins on September 10.

=== Toronto Blue Jays ===
On September 12, 2024, de Geus was claimed off waivers by the Toronto Blue Jays. In 2 appearances for the Blue Jays, he struggled to a 15.43 ERA with 1 strikeout in 2 1/3 innings pitched. On January 10, 2025, de Geus was designated for assignment following the signing of Jeff Hoffman.

=== Miami Marlins (second stint) ===
On January 15, 2025, de Geus was traded to the Pittsburgh Pirates in exchange for cash considerations. He was designated for assignment by Pittsburgh on February 22. On February 27, de Geus was claimed off waivers by the Miami Marlins. He was optioned to the Triple-A Jacksonville Jumbo Shrimp to begin the season. De Geus was designated for assignment by Miami on March 30, following a sole appearance for Triple-A Jacksonville.

=== Philadelphia Phillies ===
On April 1, 2025, de Geus was claimed off waivers by the Philadelphia Phillies. He made one appearance for Philadelphia on May 29, allowing one run in two innings of work against the Atlanta Braves. On July 31, de Geus was designated for assignment following the acquisition of Harrison Bader. He cleared waivers and was sent outright to the Triple-A Lehigh Valley IronPigs on August 3. On August 17, de Geus was released by the Phillies organization.

=== Toros de Tijuana ===
On April 14, 2026, de Geus signed with the Toros de Tijuana of the Mexican League.

== See also ==
- Rule 5 draft results
