= Wyatt Mathisen =

American baseball player (born 1993)

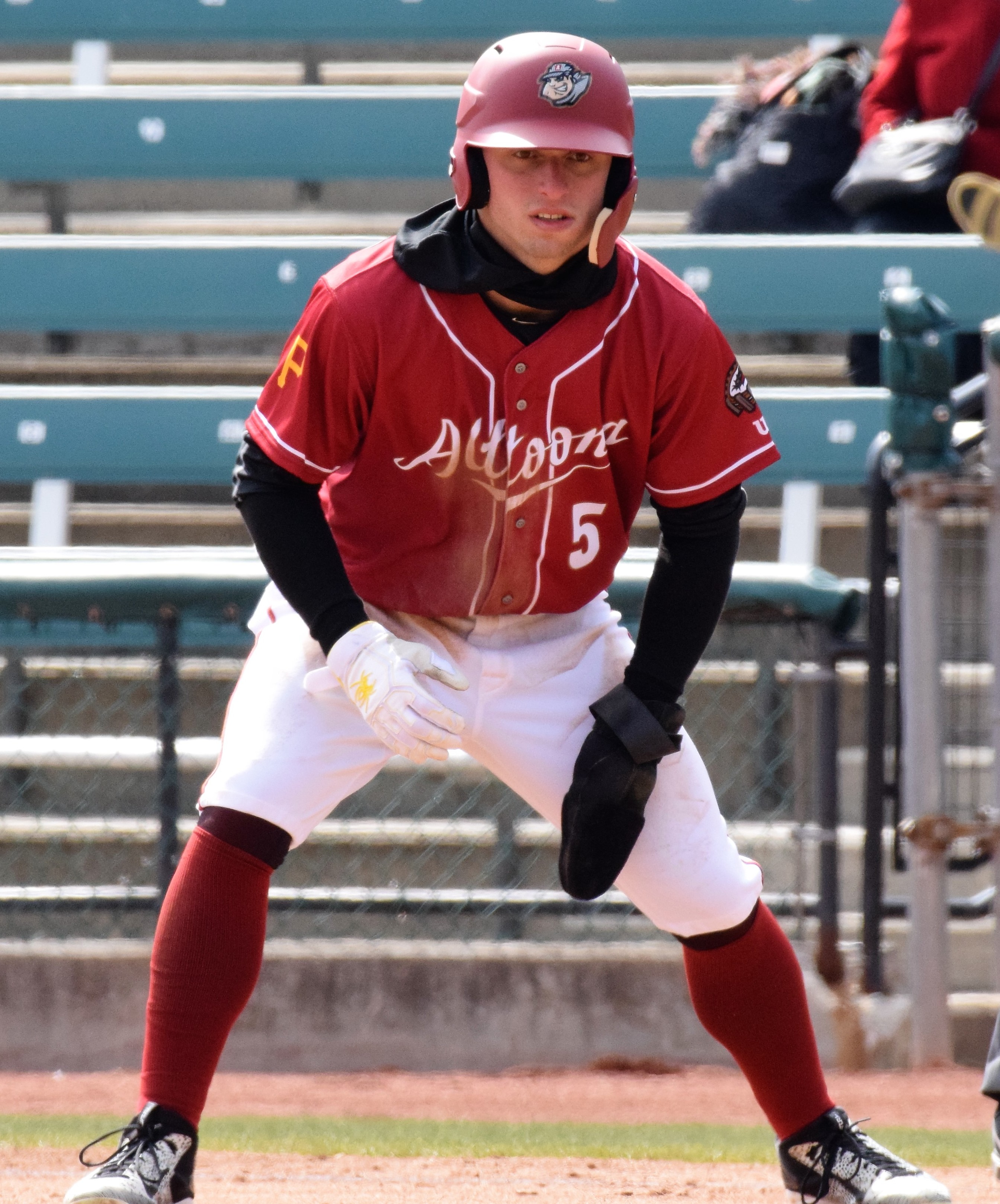
- Mathisen with the Altoona Curve in 2018
- Third baseman
- Born: December 30, 1993 (age 31); Corpus Christi, Texas, U.S.
- Batted: Right Threw: Right

MLB debut
- September 7, 2020, for the Arizona Diamondbacks

Last MLB appearance
- May 6, 2021, for the Arizona Diamondbacks

MLB statistics
- Batting average: .159
- Home runs: 3
- Runs batted in: 13
- Stats at Baseball Reference

Teams
- Arizona Diamondbacks (2020–2021)

Wyatt Lane Mathisen (born December 30, 1993) is an American former professional baseball infielder. He was drafted by the Pittsburgh Pirates in the 2nd round of the 2012 MLB draft. He played in Major League Baseball (MLB) for the Arizona Diamondbacks.

== Career ==
Mathisen attended Calallen High School in Corpus Christi, Texas. He committed to play college baseball for the Texas Longhorns.

=== Pittsburgh Pirates ===
He was drafted by the Pittsburgh Pirates in the 2nd round, with the 69th overall selection, of the 2012 MLB draft. He signed with the Pirates for a $746,300 signing bonus.

Mathisen spent the 2012 season with the GCL Pirates, hitting .295/.388/.374 with 1 home run and 15 RBI. He split the 2013 season between the GCL, the Jamestown Jammers, and the West Virginia Power, hitting a combined .228/.323/.251 with 15 home runs. He spent the 2014 season with West Virginia, hitting .280/.344/.360 with 3 home runs and 42 RBI. He spent 2015 and 2016 with the Bradenton Marauders, hitting .263 with 4 home runs and 34 RBI in 2015, and .296 with 1 home run and 18 RBI in 2016. He spent the 2017 season with the Altoona Curve, hitting .272/.357/.365 with 5 home runs and 31 RBI.

Mathisen split the 2018 season between Altoona and the Indianapolis Indians, hitting a combined .261/.363/.440 with 10 home runs and 48 RBI. He elected free agency following the season on November 2, 2018.

=== Arizona Diamondbacks ===
On November 12, 2018, Mathisen signed a minor league contract with the Arizona Diamondbacks. He split the 2019 season between the AZL Diamondbacks and the Reno Aces, hitting .288/.412/.592 with 23 home runs and 64 RBI. Mathisen was added to the Diamondbacks 40–man roster following the 2019 season.

On September 6, 2020, Mathisen was promoted to the major leagues and he made his debut the next day against the San Francisco Giants. Mathisen notched 6 hits in 39 plate appearances across 9 games in 2020.

After hitting just .119 in 23 games in 2021, Mathisen was designated for assignment by Arizona on May 12, 2021.

=== Tampa Bay Rays ===
On May 15, 2021, Mathisen was traded to the Tampa Bay Rays in exchange for cash considerations. Mathisen hit .288/.344/.525 with 3 home runs and 9 RBI in 18 games for the Triple-A Durham Bulls, but did not play in a game for Tampa Bay before being designated for assignment on June 22.

=== Seattle Mariners ===
On June 24, 2021, Mathisen was traded to the Seattle Mariners in exchange for cash considerations. Mathisen played in 14 games for the Triple-A Tacoma Rainiers, struggling to a .128/.300/.191 line before he was designated for assignment by Seattle on July 16. He was outrighted to Tacoma on July 21. On August 27, Mathisen was released by the Mariners.

=== San Francisco Giants ===
On August 29, 2021, Mathisen signed a minor league contract with the San Francisco Giants. He was assigned to the Triple-A Sacramento RiverCats. He was released on August 10, 2022.

=== Cleburne Railroaders ===
On August 17, 2022, Mathisen signed with the Cleburne Railroaders of the American Association of Professional Baseball. He was released on September 17. In 17 games he struggled hitting .204/.389/.444 with 4 home runs and 12 RBIs.
