= Corbin Martin =

American baseball player (born 1995)

Free agent
- Pitcher
- Born: December 28, 1995 (age 30); Hempstead, Texas, U.S.
- Bats: Right Throws: Right

MLB debut
- May 12, 2019, for the Houston Astros

MLB statistics (through 2026 season)
- Win–loss record: 2–5
- Earned run average: 6.81
- Strikeouts: 80
- Stats at Baseball Reference

Teams
- Houston Astros (2019); Arizona Diamondbacks (2021–2022); Baltimore Orioles (2025); Chicago Cubs (2026)

Corbin Montgomery Martin (born December 28, 1995) is an American professional baseball pitcher who is a free agent. He has previously played in Major League Baseball (MLB) for the Houston Astros, Arizona Diamondbacks, Baltimore Orioles, and Chicago Cubs.

== Career ==
=== Amateur ===
Martin attended Cypress Ranch High School in Cypress, Texas, where he played baseball and football. He played college baseball at Texas A&M University. In 2016, he played collegiate summer baseball with the Falmouth Commodores of the Cape Cod Baseball League. He was selected by the Houston Astros in the second round of the 2017 MLB draft.

=== Houston Astros ===
Martin pitched in his first professional season of 2017 with the Gulf Coast League Astros and Tri-City ValleyCats. In 32.2 innings pitched between both teams he was 0–1 with a 2.20 ERA. He started 2018 with the Buies Creek Astros and was promoted to the Corpus Christi Hooks during the season. In 25 games (21 starts) between the two teams, he compiled a 9–2 record with a 2.51 ERA and a 1.01 WHIP. He began 2019 with the Round Rock Express, posting a 2–1 record with a 3.13 ERA in 37 innings.

Martin was promoted to the major leagues for the first time on May 12, 2019, and made his major league debut versus the Texas Rangers. In five major league starts in 2019, Martin went 1–1 with a 5.59 ERA in 19 innings. On July 3, Martin underwent Tommy John surgery and missed the rest of the 2019 season.

=== Arizona Diamondbacks ===
Martin was traded on July 31, 2019, to the Arizona Diamondbacks (along with J. B. Bukauskas, Seth Beer, Joshua Rojas) and cash considerations in exchange for Zack Greinke. He did not play the rest of 2019 and all of 2020 as he recovered from Tommy John surgery.

Martin struggled in 2021. He started off in Triple-A with the Reno Aces, rehabbing from his Tommy John injury, and when he was eventually called up to the majors, he failed to impress. Across 5 games, Martin posted a 10.69 ERA, to go with an 0–3 record. On July 8, the Diamondbacks announced that Martin, who was on Reno's 7-day IL, had been shut down for the foreseeable future. He would not return to play in 2021.

On April 23, 2022, the Diamondbacks recalled Martin from Triple-A Reno. Martin made 7 appearances (2 starts) for the Diamondbacks, posting an 0–1 record and 4.84 ERA with 21 strikeouts in 22 1/3 innings pitched. The majority of his season was spent in Reno, where he made 17 starts and pitched to a 6–7 record and 6.08 ERA with 79 strikeouts in 77 innings of work.

On March 15, 2023, Martin suffered a tear in the lat tendon under his right shoulder during a spring training game. He later opted for surgery that would sideline him for the entire 2023 season. Martin was optioned to Triple–A Reno to begin the 2024 season. He made two appearances for Reno before he was designated for assignment on April 7, 2024.

=== Milwaukee Brewers ===
On April 14, 2024, Martin was claimed off waivers by the Milwaukee Brewers. He made seven appearances for the Triple–A Nashville Sounds before he was designated for assignment on May 10.

=== Baltimore Orioles ===
On May 13, 2024, Martin was claimed off waivers by the Baltimore Orioles. On June 15, the Orioles removed Martin from their 40–man roster and outrighted him to the Triple–A Norfolk Tides. In 29 appearances for the Tides, he compiled a 1-2 record and 4.05 ERA with 31 strikeouts across 33 1/3 innings pitched.

Martin began the 2025 season with Triple-A Norfolk, logging a 2-2 record and 5.29 ERA with 31 strikeouts over 29 appearances. On July 2, 2025, the Orioles selected Martin's contract, adding him to their active roster. He made one scoreless appearance with Baltimore before being designated for assignment on July 13. Martin elected free agency after clearing waivers on July 17. The next day, Martin re-signed with the Orioles on a major league contract. In 17 total appearances for Baltimore, he logged a 1-0 record and 6.00 ERA with 23 strikeouts and two saves over 18 innings of work. Martin was designated for assignment by the Orioles on September 2. He cleared waivers and was sent outright to Triple-A Norfolk on September 4. Martin elected free agency on September 30.

=== Chicago Cubs ===
On January 12, 2026, Martin signed a minor league contract with the Chicago Cubs. He was assigned to the Triple-A Iowa Cubs to begin the regular season. On April 18, Chicago selected Martin's contract, adding him to their active roster. He made seven appearances for the team, struggling to a 10.80 ERA with four strikeouts and one save across five innings pitched. On May 7, Martin was designated for assignment by the Cubs. He cleared waivers and was sent outright to Triple-A Iowa on May 10. He elected free agency on October 3.

== Personal ==
Martin and his wife, Alyssa, were married in January 2020. Their first child, a son, was born in October 2020.
