= Miguel Aguilar (baseball) =

Mexican baseball player (born 1991)

Charros de Jalisco – No. 60
- Pitcher
- Born: September 26, 1991 (age 34); Ciudad Obregón, Sonora, Mexico
- Bats: Left Throws: Left

MLB debut
- July 30, 2021, for the Arizona Diamondbacks

MLB statistics (through 2021 season)
- Win–loss record: 1–1
- Earned run average: 6.43
- Strikeouts: 3
- Stats at Baseball Reference

Teams
- Arizona Diamondbacks (2021)

Miguel Armando Aguilar (born September 26, 1991) is a Mexican professional baseball pitcher for the Charros de Jalisco of the Mexican League. He has previously played in Major League Baseball (MLB) for the Arizona Diamondbacks.

== Career ==
=== Algodoneros de Unión Laguna ===
Aguilar began his career in the Mexican League with the Algodoneros de Unión Laguna in 2012, going 0–0 with a 5.87 ERA in 115.1 innings. In 2013 with the team, Aguilar went 4–4 with a 5.68 ERA in 38 innings.

=== Leones de Yucatán ===
On July 8, 2014, Aguilar was traded to the Leones de Yucatán. Between the two teams, he went 0–0 with a 10.66 ERA over 21.1 innings in 2014. Aguilar went 1–1 with a 2.14 ERA in 33.1 innings in 2015, and went 1–1 with a 2.08 ERA in 30.1 innings for Yucatán in 2016.

=== Arizona Diamondbacks ===
On September 19, 2016, Aguilar signed a minor league contract with the Arizona Diamondbacks organization. He spent the 2017 season with the High-A Visalia Rawhide, going 0–0 with a 1.19 ERA in 22.2 innings. He split the 2018 season between Visalia and the Double-A Jackson Generals, going a combined 1–2 with a 2.97 ERA over 57.2 innings. He spent the 2019 season with Jackson, going 1–1 with a 2.12 ERA in 29.2 innings. Following the 2019 season, Aguilar played for the Salt River Rafters of the Arizona Fall League. Aguilar did not play in a game in 2020 due to the cancellation of the minor league season because of the COVID-19 pandemic. He was assigned to the Triple-A Reno Aces to begin the 2021 season.

On July 30, 2021, Arizona selected his contract and promoted him to the active roster. He made his major league debut that day against the Los Angeles Dodgers. Three days later, on August 2, Aguilar was charged with the loss in his first career decision when he pitched the tenth inning against the San Francisco Giants, giving up two earned runs. On August 17, Aguilar earned his first career win against the Philadelphia Phillies. In nine MLB appearances, Aguilar pitched to a 1–1 record with a 6.43 ERA in 7.0 innings.

On November 19, 2021, the Diamondbacks removed Aguilar from the 40-man roster and sent him outright to Triple-A Reno. He spent the entire 2022 season with Reno, posting a 3–2 record and 5.44 ERA with 34 strikeouts and 5 saves in 46.1 innings pitched. He was released on November 15, 2022.

=== Leones de Yucatán (second stint) ===
On March 24, 2023, Aguilar signed with the Leones de Yucatán of the Mexican League. In 41 relief appearances, Aguilar posted a strong 1.83 ERA with 39 strikeouts across 34 1/3 innings of work.

=== Charros de Jalisco ===
On February 6, 2024, Yucatán loaned Aguilar to the Charros de Jalisco of the Mexican League. In 35 games he threw 28.2 innings of relief going 2-1 with a 7.53 ERA and 29 strikeouts.

In 2025, he returned for a second season with Jalisco. In 34 games he threw 29.1 innings of relief going 2-4 with a 6.14 ERA and 33 strikeouts.

== International baseball ==
Aguilar was selected for the Mexico national baseball team at the 2017 World Baseball Classic.
