= Seth Beer =

American baseball player (born 1996)

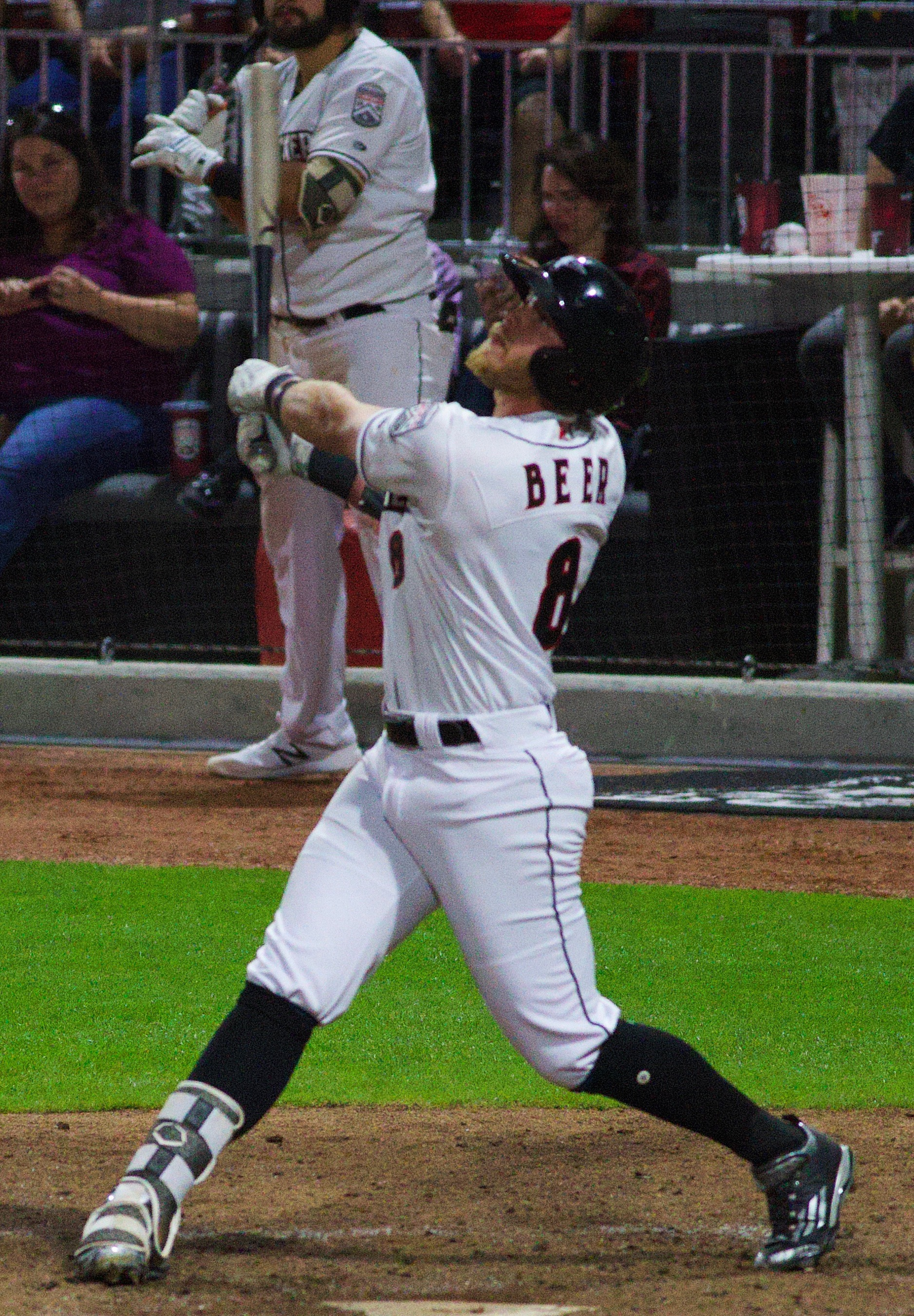
- Beer with the Fayetteville Woodpeckers in 2019

Olmecas de Tabasco – No. 28
- Outfielder / First baseman
- Born: September 18, 1996 (age 30); Maryville, Illinois, U.S.
- Bats: Left Throws: Right

MLB debut
- September 10, 2021, for the Arizona Diamondbacks

MLB statistics (through 2022 season)
- Batting average: .208
- Home runs: 2
- Runs batted in: 12
- Stats at Baseball Reference

Teams
- Arizona Diamondbacks (2021–2022)

Career highlights and awards
- Dick Howser Trophy (2016)

Seth Michael Beer (born September 18, 1996) is an American professional baseball outfielder and first baseman for the Olmecas de Tabasco of the Mexican League. He has previously played in Major League Baseball (MLB) for the Arizona Diamondbacks. He played college baseball for the Clemson Tigers, and was selected by the Houston Astros in the first round of the 2018 MLB draft.

== Amateur career ==
Beer attended Lambert High School in Forsyth County, Georgia. As a junior, he hit .560 with eight home runs and 41 runs batted in (RBIs) and as a sophomore hit .589 with 10 home runs. Due to his age, Beer was able to graduate from high school early and attend Clemson University to play college baseball for the Clemson Tigers.

Beer was a starter his freshman year at Clemson in 2016. His first collegiate home run was a grand slam. Against Boston College, he hit a 10th inning walk-off home run. Beer was named the National Midseason Player of the Year by Perfect Game after hitting .430/.538/.935 with 13 home runs and 37 RBIs in 27 games. He was awarded the Dick Howser Trophy for the national college player of the year for the 2016 season, the first time the award was given to a freshman.

== Professional career ==
=== Houston Astros ===
The Houston Astros selected Beer in the first round, with the 28th overall selection, of 2018 MLB draft. Beer signed with the Astros on June 13, 2018, for a $2.25 million signing bonus. He was assigned on June 15, 2018, to the Tri-City ValleyCats of the Low-A New York–Penn League, where he hit a two-run homer in his minor league debut. On June 27, Beer was promoted to the Quad Cities River Bandits of the Single-A Midwest League. On July 30, after a short stint with the River Bandits, Beer was promoted to the Buies Creek Astros of the High-A Carolina League. In 67 games between the three teams, he slashed .304/.389/.496 with 12 home runs and 42 RBI.

Beer began 2019 in the Carolina League again with the team, renamed the Fayetteville Woodpeckers. Beer was promoted to the Corpus Christi Hooks of the Double-A Texas League in May.

=== Arizona Diamondbacks ===
On July 31, 2019, the Astros traded Beer to the Arizona Diamondbacks along with prospects J.B. Bukauskas, Corbin Martin, and Joshua Rojas for Zack Greinke. He was assigned to the Jackson Generals of the Southern League, finishing the season there. Over 122 games between Fayetteville, Corpus Christi, and Jackson, Beer batted .289/.388/.516 with 26 home runs, 31 hit by pitch, and 103 RBIs. On July 7, 2020, it was announced that Beer had tested positive for COVID-19. He did not play in a game in 2020 due to the cancellation of the minor league season because of the COVID-19 pandemic. Beer began the 2021 season with the Triple-A Reno Aces.

On September 10, 2021, Beer was selected to the 40-man roster and promoted to the major leagues for the first time. In his MLB debut that day, Beer homered against the Seattle Mariners' Diego Castillo, becoming the 129th player in MLB history to homer in his first major-league at-bat. On September 14, Beer suffered a dislocated left shoulder and was placed on the injured list three days later.

In 2021, with Triple-A Reno, he batted .287/.398/.511 with 73 runs (2nd in the Triple-A West), 33 doubles (3rd), and 30 hit by pitch (leading the league) in 362 at bats.

Beer hit a walk-off three-run homer to give the Diamondbacks a 4–2 Opening Day victory over the San Diego Padres on April 7, 2022, and he became the first rookie in Major League history to hit a walk-off home run while trailing on Opening Day, which was also coincidentally National Beer Day. Beer was optioned to the minors on May 15. In 38 games with Arizona in 2022, Beer hit just .189/.278/.243 with one home run and nine RBIs.

Beer was optioned to Triple-A Reno to begin the 2023 season. In 19 games for Reno, he batted .200/.266/.314 with 2 home runs and 12 RBIs. Beer was designated for assignment on May 3, 2023, following the promotion of Brandon Pfaadt. He cleared waivers and was sent outright to Triple-A Reno on May 9.

=== Pittsburgh Pirates ===
On December 6, 2023, the Pittsburgh Pirates selected Beer in the minor league phase of the Rule 5 draft. He made 99 appearances split between the Double-A Altoona Curve and Triple-A Indianapolis Indians, hitting a combined .277/.354/.431 with 12 home runs and 54 RBI. Beer elected free agency following the season on November 4, 2024.

=== Long Island Ducks ===
On April 7, 2025, Beer signed with the Long Island Ducks of the Atlantic League of Professional Baseball. In 14 appearances for the Ducks, Beer batted .239/.426/.565 with four home runs and 14 RBI.

=== Philadelphia Phillies ===
On May 12, 2025, Beer's contract was purchased by the Philadelphia Phillies. In 30 appearances for the Double-A Reading Fightin Phils, he slashed .190/.283/.314 with three home runs and 10 RBI. Beer was released by the Phillies organization on July 1.

=== Long Island Ducks (second stint) ===
On July 4, 2025, Beer signed with the Long Island Ducks of the Atlantic League of Professional Baseball. Combined between his two stints for the season he appeared in 66 games and batted .303/.418/.489 with 10 home runs and 58 RBI. Beer became a free agent following the season.

=== Olmecas de Tabasco ===
On February 26, 2026, Beer signed with the Olmecas de Tabasco of the Mexican League.

== Personal life ==
Beer was a swimmer when he was younger, and, at 12 years old, he set national records in the 50-meter backstroke and 100-meter backstroke. He later quit swimming to focus on baseball after two high school seasons. He also played two seasons of high school football.

== See also ==
- Rule 5 draft results
