= J. B. Bukauskas =

American baseball player (born 1996)

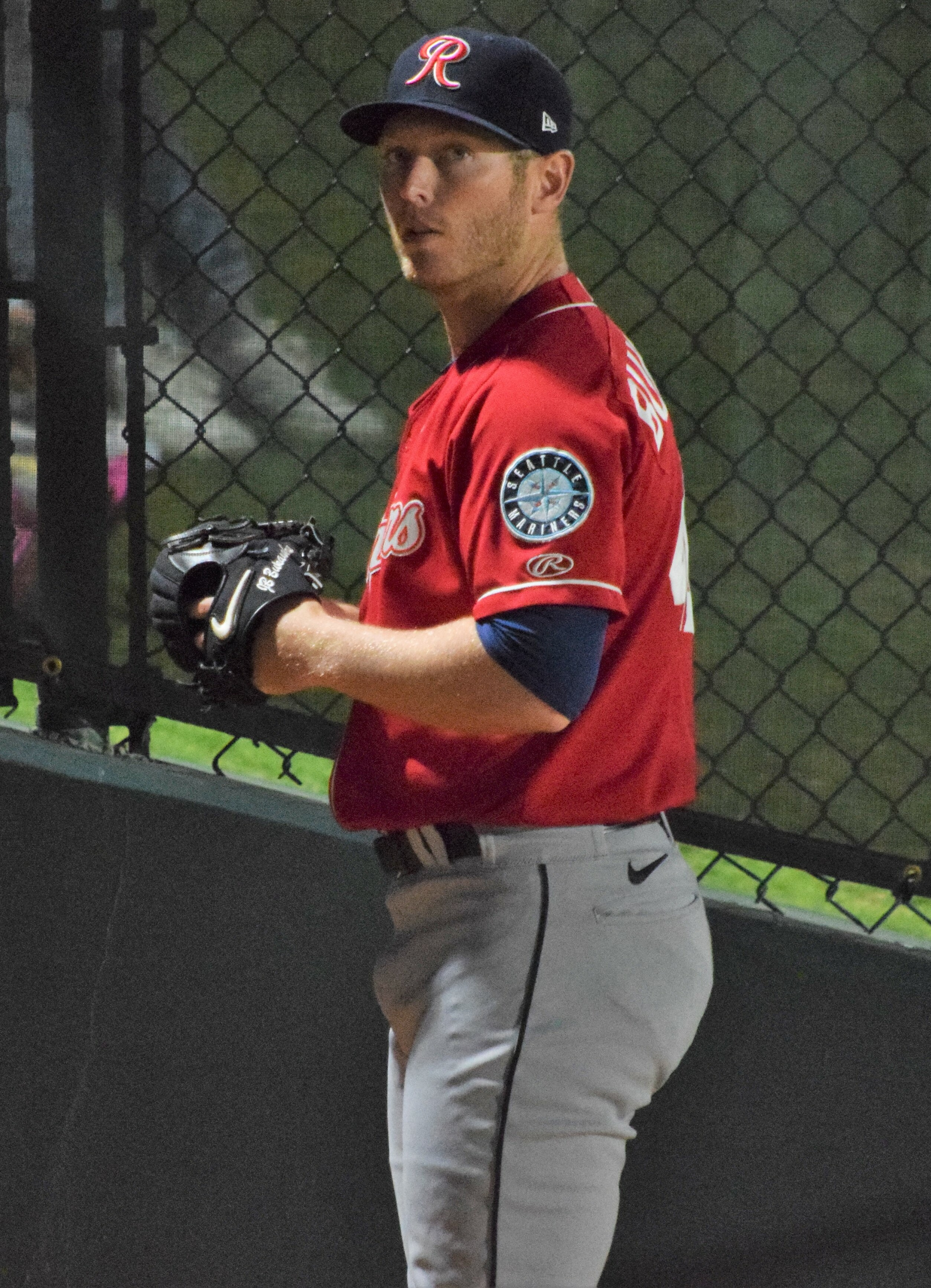
- Bukauskas with the Tacoma Rainiers in 2023

Free agent
- Pitcher
- Born: October 11, 1996 (age 30); Ashburn, Virginia, U.S.
- Bats: Right Throws: Right

MLB debut
- April 20, 2021, for the Arizona Diamondbacks

MLB statistics (through 2024 season)
- Win–loss record: 2–2
- Earned run average: 5.04
- Strikeouts: 27
- Stats at Baseball Reference

Teams
- Arizona Diamondbacks (2021); Seattle Mariners (2023); Milwaukee Brewers (2023–2024)

Jacob Allen "J. B." Bukauskas (born October 11, 1996) is an American professional baseball pitcher who is a free agent. He has previously played in Major League Baseball (MLB) for the Arizona Diamondbacks, Seattle Mariners, and Milwaukee Brewers. Bukauskas played college baseball for the North Carolina Tar Heels of the University of North Carolina at Chapel Hill.

== Amateur career ==
Bukauskas attended Stone Bridge High School in Ashburn, Virginia. As a freshman, he helped Stone Bridge win both the regular season and district titles. On July 7, 2012, Bukauskas committed to the University of North Carolina, which he considered his "dream school". As a sophomore, he was named first-team All-Met. Bukauskas reclassified during the summer after his sophomore year in order to graduate and attend North Carolina a year early. He was named the 2014 All-Met Baseball Player of the Year after compiling a 7–0 record, striking out 88 batters, and not allowing an earned run during the season. Bukauskas finished his high school career with a 21–3 record, 264 strikeouts, and a 0.88 ERA.

Despite being expected by some to be drafted within the first two rounds of the 2014 Major League Baseball (MLB) draft, Bukauskas asked every MLB team not to draft him. He was selected in the 20th round by the Arizona Diamondbacks but did not sign with the club, reaffirming his commitment to North Carolina.

In his freshman year, Bukauskas led the Tar Heels with 14 games started and was part of the weekend rotation. In 2016, he played collegiate summer baseball with the Chatham Anglers of the Cape Cod Baseball League. As a junior, after going 9–0 with a 2.02 ERA during the regular season, he was named ACC Pitcher of the Year and first-team all-American by Baseball America and Collegiate Baseball.

== Professional career ==
=== Houston Astros ===
The Houston Astros selected Bukauskas with the 15th overall selection in the 2017 MLB draft. He signed with the Astros on July 7, 2017. He was assigned to the Gulf Coast League Astros, and after one scoreless outing for them, was promoted to the Tri-City ValleyCats where he finished the season, posting a 4.50 ERA in six innings pitched.

In 2018, Bukauskas returned to pitch in the GCL and with the ValleyCats along with pitching for the Quad Cities River Bandits, Buies Creek Astros, and the Corpus Christi Hooks, compiling a combined 4–2 record with a 2.14 ERA in 14 starts between the five teams; he missed time during the year due to injury. He returned to Corpus Christi to begin the 2019 season.

=== Arizona Diamondbacks ===
The Astros traded Bukauskas, Corbin Martin, Seth Beer, Joshua Rojas, and cash considerations to the Arizona Diamondbacks in exchange for Zack Greinke on July 31, 2019. He was assigned to the Jackson Generals and finished the season there. Over 22 games (16 starts) between the two clubs, he went 2–5 with a 5.44 ERA. On November 20, 2020, Bukauskas was added to the 40-man roster.

On April 18, 2021, Bukauskas was promoted to the major leagues for the first time. He made his MLB debut on April 20 against the Cincinnati Reds, getting Nick Senzel to fly out as the only batter he faced.

On March 19, 2022, it was announced that Bukauskas had suffered a torn teres major muscle and would be out for months. He was activated on July 21 and optioned to the Triple-A Reno Aces. On January 11, 2023, Bukauskas was designated for assignment following the signing of Zach Davies.

=== Seattle Mariners ===
On January 17, 2023, Bukauskas was claimed off waivers by the Seattle Mariners. On January 31, Bukauskas was designated for assignment by the Mariners following the waiver claim of Tayler Saucedo. On February 2, he cleared waivers and was outrighted to the Triple-A Tacoma Rainiers.

On April 9, Bukauskas had his contract selected to the active roster after four appearances with Tacoma. He made one appearance for the Mariners, allowing two runs, one earned in an inning of relief work against the Cleveland Guardians. He was designated for assignment on April 14, after Tommy Milone was selected to the roster.

=== Milwaukee Brewers ===
On April 18, 2023, Bukauskas was claimed off waivers by the Milwaukee Brewers and optioned to the Triple-A Nashville Sounds. After 5 appearances for the Sounds, Bukauskas was recalled to the Brewers on May 16. However, he was placed on the injured list with a cervical strain four days later without appearing in a game for the Brewers. On July 1, Bukauskas was recalled by the Brewers. He made five scoreless appearances for Milwaukee in 2023, striking out six batters in six innings.

Bukauskas was optioned to Triple-A Nashville to begin the 2024 season. He made six appearances for Milwaukee before he was placed on the injured list with a lat strain on April 14. Bukauskas was transferred to the 60-day injured list on May 10. In six games for the Brewers, he posted a 1.50 ERA with six strikeouts across six innings pitched.

On January 17, 2025, Bukauskas was designated for assignment by Milwaukee. He cleared waivers and was sent to Triple-A Nashville on January 23. On February 25, it was announced that Bukauskas would undergo lat surgery and miss the entirety of the 2025 season.

On November 22, 2025, Bukauskas re-signed with the Brewers organization on a minor league contract. In 11 games between Triple-A and Rookie ball he threw 8 innings of relief going 1-2 with a 12.38 ERA with more walks (11) than strikeouts (8). He was released on October 9.

== Pitching style ==
Bukauskas regularly throws a mid-90s fastball and been able to hit 100 miles per hour with it since his last year of high school. He also has a slider that sits in the mid-80s and a changeup in his repertoire.

== Personal life ==
Bukauskas' parents are Ken and Lynn Bukauskas. He majored in communications during his career as a student-athlete at North Carolina. He is of Lithuanian origin.
