= Humberto Mejía =

Panamanian baseball player (born 1997)

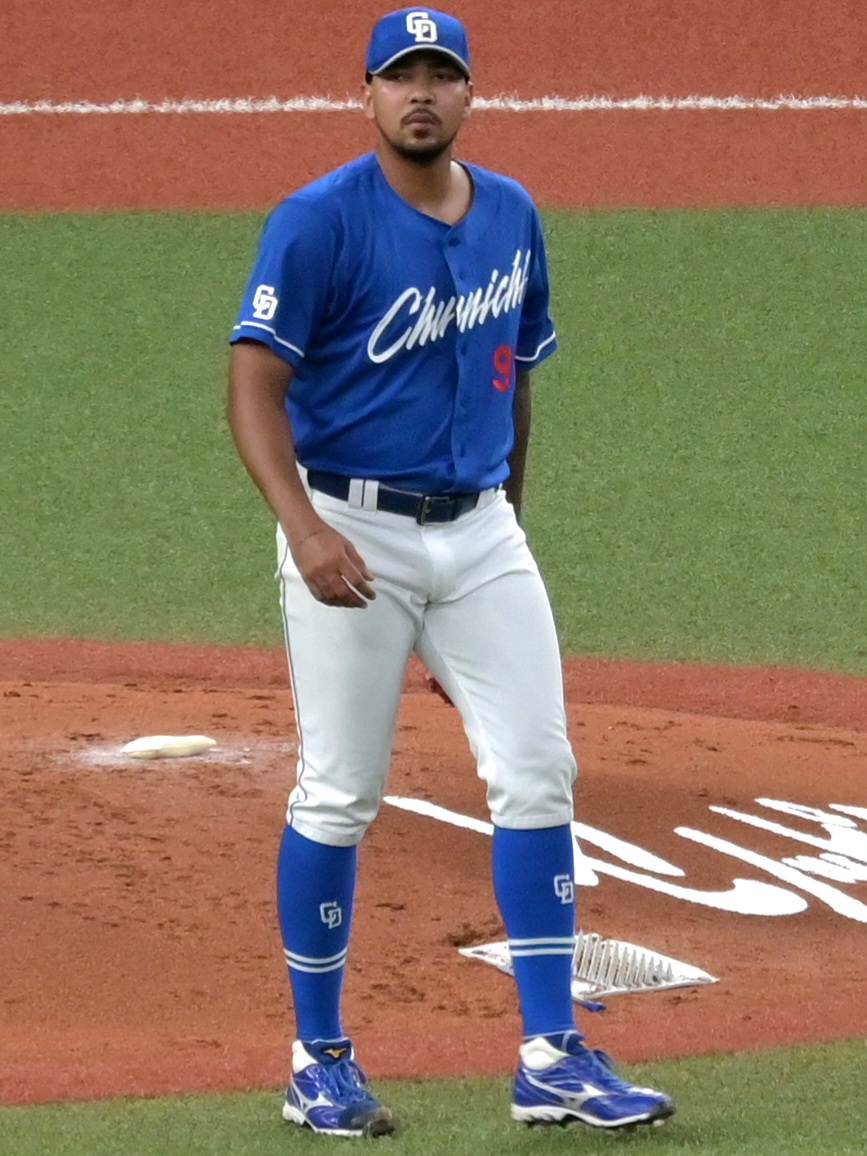
- Mejía with the Chunichi Dragons in 2024

Free agent
- Pitcher
- Born: March 3, 1997 (age 29); Panama City, Panama
- Bats: Right Throws: Right

Professional debut
- MLB: August 7, 2020, for the Miami Marlins
- NPB: June 24, 2023, for the Chunichi Dragons

MLB statistics (through 2021 season)
- Win–loss record: 0–5
- Earned run average: 6.68
- Strikeouts: 31

NPB statistics (through 2026 season)
- Win–loss record: 8–12
- Earned run average: 3.70
- Strikeouts: 112
- Stats at Baseball Reference

Teams
- Miami Marlins (2020); Arizona Diamondbacks (2021); Chunichi Dragons (2023–2026)

Humberto Albert Mejía (born March 3, 1997) is a Panamanian professional baseball pitcher who is a free agent. He has previously played in Major League Baseball (MLB) for the Miami Marlins and Arizona Diamondbacks and in Nippon Professional Baseball (NPB) for the Chunichi Dragons.

== Career ==
=== Miami Marlins ===
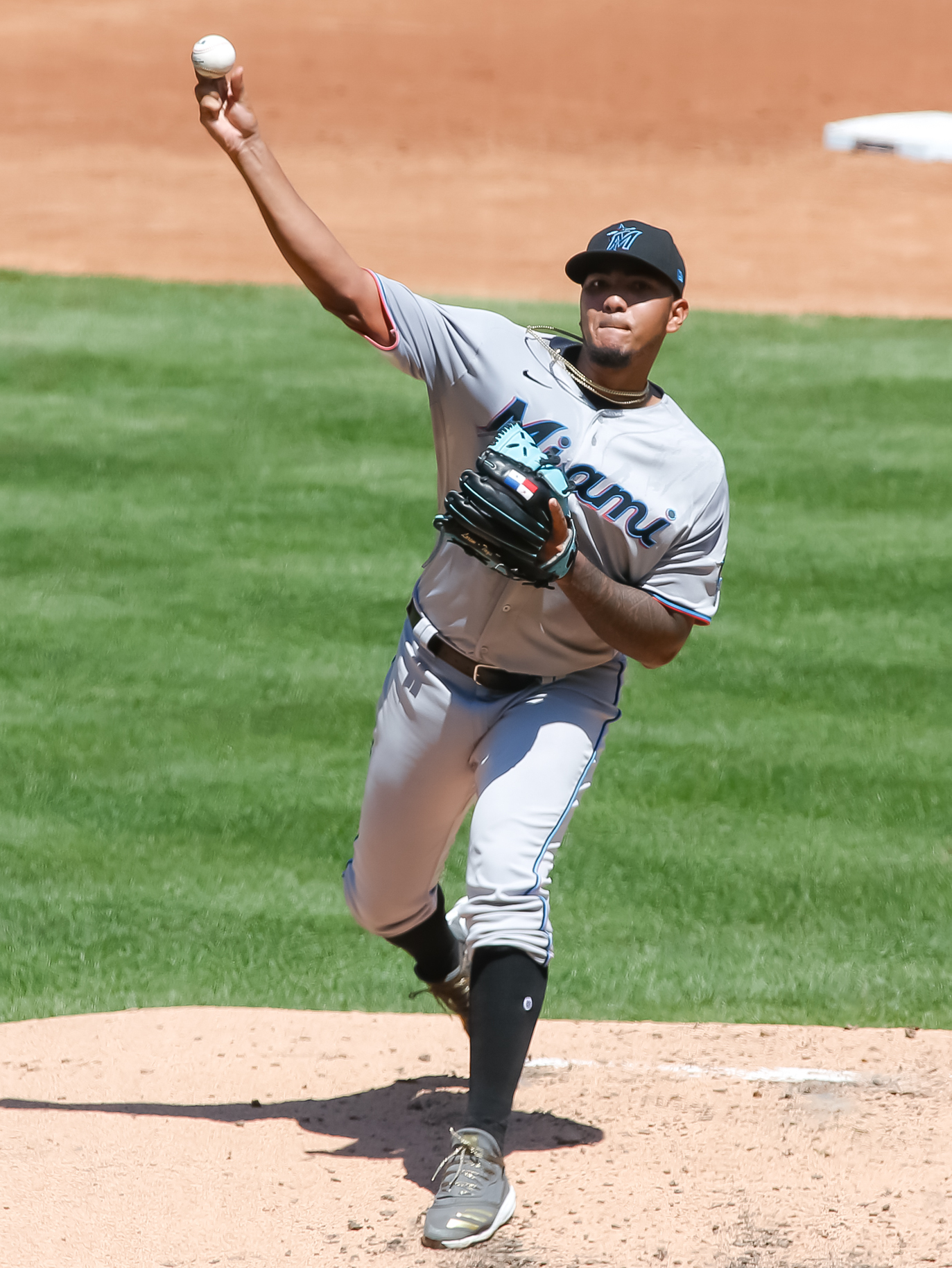
Mejía with the Miami Marlins in 2020

On September 16, 2013, Mejía signed with the Miami Marlins as an international free agent. He did not appear in a professional game until 2015 when he played for the DSL Marlins, and went 3–3 with a 1.69 ERA over 74 2/3 innings.

In 2016, Mejía split the season between the GCL Marlins and the Batavia Muckdogs, going 4–5 with a 2.90 ERA over 49 2/3 innings. In 2017, Mejía missed the season due to injury. In 2018, Mejía returned to Batavia, going 1–6 with a 3.30 ERA over 62 2/3innings.

In 2019, Mejía split the season between the Single-A Clinton LumberKings and the High-A Jupiter Hammerheads, going a combined 5–2 with a 2.09 ERA over 90 1/3 innings. Following the season, he was added to the Marlins 40–man roster.

On August 7, 2020, Mejía made his MLB debut against the New York Mets and pitched 2.1 innings of one-run ball.

=== Arizona Diamondbacks ===
On August 31, 2020, Mejía, Caleb Smith, and Julio Frias were traded to the Arizona Diamondbacks in exchange for Starling Marte. Mejía made 5 appearances for the Diamondbacks in 2021, going 0–3 with a 7.25 ERA and 20 strikeouts. On the farm, Mejía made 21 starts split between the Triple-A Reno Aces and Double-A Amarillo Sod Poodles, posting a cumulative 7–9 record and 5.12 ERA with 100 strikeouts in 103.2 innings pitched.

Mejía was optioned to Triple-A Reno to begin the 2022 season. On April 7, 2022, he was designated for assignment by Arizona. He cleared waivers and was sent outright to Reno on April 10. After 9 games in Reno, in which he struggled to a 9.60 ERA, Mejía was released on May 24.

=== Guerreros de Oaxaca ===
On June 4, 2022, Mejía signed with the Guerreros de Oaxaca of the Mexican League. In 3 starts, he posted a 0–2 record with a 7.71 ERA. Mejía was released on June 24.

=== Mariachis de Guadalajara ===
On June 26, 2022, Mejía signed with the Mariachis de Guadalajara. On July 14, Mejía threw the first complete-game shutout in club history, blanking the Piratas de Campeche while only allowing 3 hits in the 10–0 victory. In 7 starts for Guadalajara, he worked to a 2–2 record and 4.99 ERA with 26 strikeouts in 39.2 innings pitched.

=== Toros de Tijuana ===
On August 1, 2022, Mejía was traded to the Toros de Tijuana. In his team debut on August 4, Mejía tossed 5.0 quality innings in a 5–2 victory over the Generales de Durango. The start proved to be his only appearance for the team down the stretch.

=== New York Mets ===
On January 4, 2023, Mejia signed a minor league deal with the New York Mets. He was assigned to the Triple-A Syracuse Mets to begin the season, where he made 8 starts and logged a 6.17 ERA with 30 strikeouts in 35.0 innings of work.

=== Chunichi Dragons ===
On May 24, 2023, Mejía signed with the Chunichi Dragons of Nippon Professional Baseball. In his first season in Japan Mejía had a 3-1 record with a 2.23 ERA in 8 starts. The following season Mejía started 15 games, posting a 3-8 record and 4.88 ERA, with 51 strikeouts in 75.2 innings pitched.

For the 2025 season he appeared mostly in a relief role, only starting 4 out of the 25 games he appeared in. Mejía had a 2-2 record, a 3.35 ERA, with 28 strikeouts in 45.2 innings pitched.

On November 1, 2026, it was announced the Dragons would not be bringing Mejia back for the 2027 season.

== International career ==
Mejía was selected to represent Panama at the 2023 World Baseball Classic qualification.
