= Brandyn Sittinger =

American baseball player (born 1994)

Lake Erie Crushers – No. 11
- Pitcher
- Born: June 6, 1994 (age 31); Elyria, Ohio, U.S.
- Bats: Right Throws: Right

MLB debut
- September 8, 2021, for the Arizona Diamondbacks

MLB statistics (through 2021 season)
- Win–loss record: 0–1
- Earned run average: 7.71
- Strikeouts: 1
- Stats at Baseball Reference

Teams
- Arizona Diamondbacks (2021)

Brandyn Bernard Sittinger (born June 6, 1994) is an American professional baseball pitcher for the Lake Erie Crushers of the Frontier League. He has previously played in Major League Baseball (MLB) for the Arizona Diamondbacks.

== Career ==
=== Detroit Tigers ===
Sittinger was drafted by the Detroit Tigers in the 17th round with the 505th pick of the 2016 MLB draft and was assigned to the Gulf Coast League Tigers West on June 24. On July 29, he was called up to the Lakeland Flying Tigers of High–A. On August 8, he was assigned to the Connecticut Tigers in Low–A. Overall in 2016 across all levels, he went 0–1, pitched 20.2 innings in 16 games, had a 1.74 ERA, a 1.45 WHIP, and struck out 24.

On June 12, 2017, Sittinger was once again promoted to the Flying Tigers but would be demoted 3 days later. On August 1, he was promoted to the West Michigan Whitecaps of Single–A. Overall in 2017 across all levels, he went 4–1, pitched 30.1 innings in 18 games, had a 2.08 ERA, a 1.25 WHIP, and struck out 39.

On April 29, 2018, Sittinger was assigned to Tigers extended Spring Training for the first time in his career. On June 18, Sittinger was selected as an all-star for the East Division of the Midwest League, his first all-star nod over any level. On June 27, Sittinger was once again promoted to the Flying Tigers. Overall in 2018 across all levels, he went 2–1, pitched 49.2 innings in 25 games, had a 3.81 ERA, a 1.53 WHIP, and struck out 67.

On May 5, 2019, Sittinger was promoted to the Erie SeaWolves of Double-A but would be demoted to the Flying Tigers again 7 days later. On June 2, he was once again promoted to the SeaWolves but would be put on the 7-day injured list 6 days later. On June 27, he would be again demoted to the Flying Tigers 4 days after being taken off the injured list. On July 12, Sittinger was released by the Tigers. Overall in 2019 across all levels, he went 0–2, pitched 28 innings in 20 games, had a 7.39 ERA, a 1.86 WHIP, and struck out 29.

=== Evansville Otters ===
On July 26, 2019, Sittinger signed with the Evansville Otters of the independent Frontier League. During his time there, he went 2-2, pitched 38 innings in 7 games, 6 started, and struck out 52 with an ERA of 1.42 and a WHIP of 1.16. In the playoffs, he pitched 3.1 innings in 1 start, allowed 4 earned runs, 7 hits, and struck out 2 while walking 2. He earned the loss and did not pitch again for the Otters.

=== Arizona Diamondbacks ===
On November 29, 2019, the Arizona Diamondbacks signed him to a minor league deal and assigned him to the Jackson Generals of Double-A. With the cancellation of the 2020 Minor League season, he did not play in the Diamondbacks organization until 2021.

On February 12, 2021, Sittinger was assigned to the Amarillo Sod Poodles of Double-A. On June 21, he was promoted to the Reno Aces of Triple-A, his first Triple-A stint.

Sittinger was called up to the majors for the first time on September 7, 2021. Sittinger made his MLB debut the following day, tossing a scoreless inning against the Texas Rangers. On September 20, he was demoted to the Aces, then promoted again on October 5 only to be demoted back to the Aces 2 days later. Sittinger was outrighted off of the 40-man roster on October 7. Overall in 2021 in the minors, Sittinger went 1–2, pitched 39 1/3 innings in 35 games, had a 4.12 ERA, a 1.17 WHIP, and struck out 53. In the majors, he went 0–1, pitched 4 2/3 innings in 5 games, had a 7.71 ERA, a 1.50 WHIP, and struck out 1. Following the 2021 season, Sittinger became a free agent.

=== Atlanta Braves ===
On February 26, 2022, Sittinger signed a minor league contract with the Atlanta Braves. He was assigned to the Triple-A Gwinnett Stripers to begin the year. Sittinger struggled to a 1–3 record and 6.26 ERA across 23 appearances, striking out 29 in 27 1/3 innings pitched. He was released by the Braves organization on July 14.

=== Lancaster Barnstormers ===
On August 7, 2022, Sittinger signed with the Lancaster Barnstormers of the Atlantic League of Professional Baseball. In 13 games for the Barnstormers down the stretch, he logged a 1–2 record and 3.44 ERA with 21 strikeouts in 18 1/3 innings of work. With Lancaster, Sittinger won the Atlantic League championship.

On March 24, 2023, Sittinger re-signed with the Barnstormers. with manager Ross Peeples announcing that Sittinger would function as a starting pitcher to begin the season. In 31 games (10 starts), he posted a 5–7 record and 5.93 ERA with 98 strikeouts in 82 innings of work. Sittinger would win his second straight Atlantic League championship with the Barnstormers in 2023. He became a free agent following the 2023 season.

On February 8, 2024, Sittinger signed with the Tecolotes de los Dos Laredos of the Mexican League. However, he was released prior to the season on April 10.

=== Lake Erie Crushers ===
On March 2, 2025, Sittinger signed with the Lake Erie Crushers of the Frontier League. He made 39 appearances (including five starts) for the team, compiling a 3-1 record and 3.33 ERA with 88 strikeouts and four saves over 73 innings of work.

On March 22, 2026, Sittinger re-signed with the Crushers.
