= Matt Peacock (baseball) =

American baseball player (born 1994)

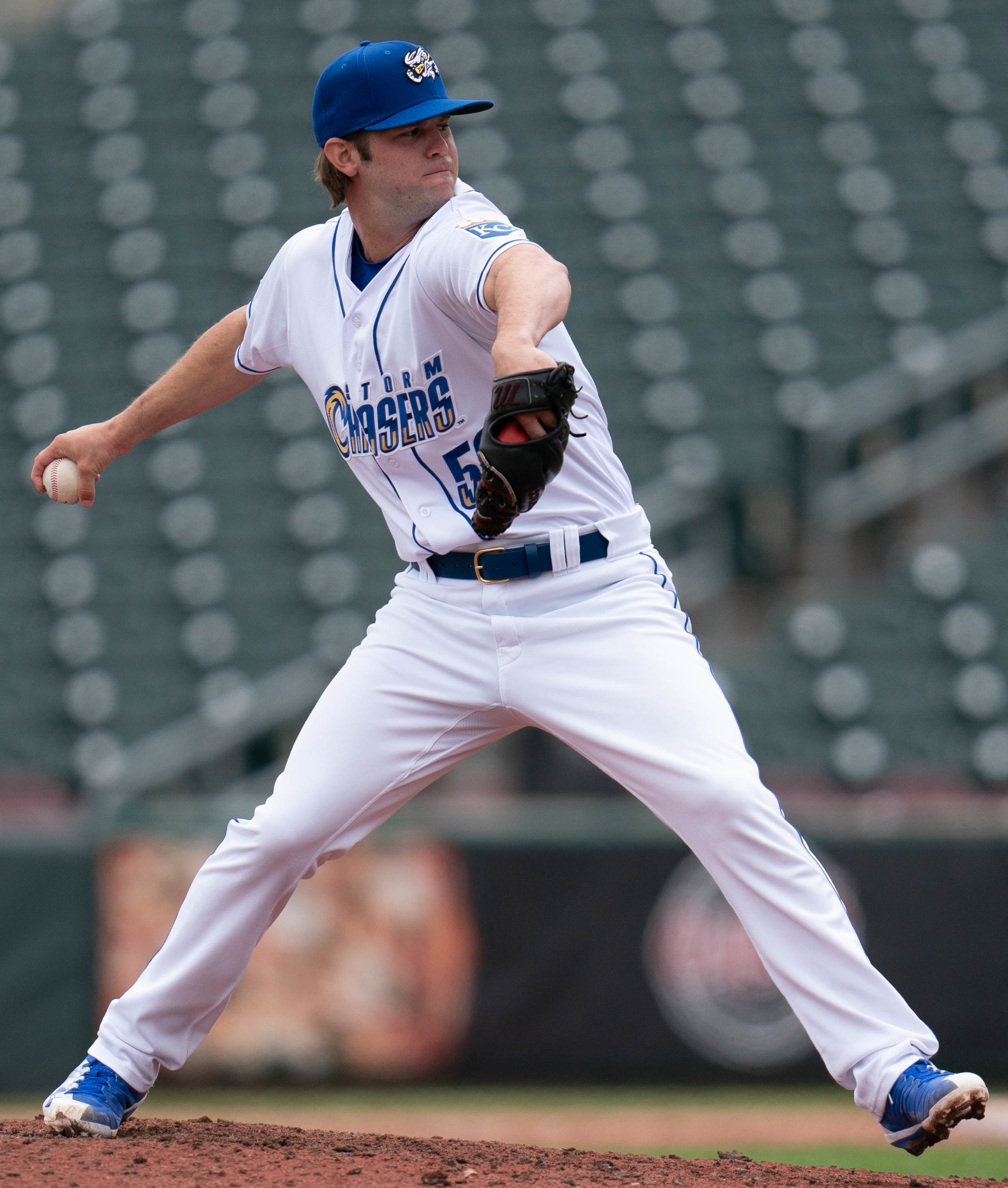
- Peacock with the Omaha Storm Chasers in 2022

Free agent
- Pitcher
- Born: February 27, 1994 (age 32); Saraland, Alabama, U.S.
- Bats: Right Throws: Right

MLB debut
- April 6, 2021, for the Arizona Diamondbacks

MLB statistics (through 2022 season)
- Win–loss record: 5–7
- Earned run average: 4.95
- Strikeouts: 56
- Stats at Baseball Reference

Teams
- Arizona Diamondbacks (2021–2022); Kansas City Royals (2022)

Matthew Allen Peacock (born February 27, 1994) is an American professional baseball pitcher who is a free agent. He has previously played in Major League Baseball (MLB) for the Arizona Diamondbacks and the Kansas City Royals.

== Amateur career ==
Peacock attended Saraland High School in Saraland, Alabama. In 2011, his junior year, he posted a 3.42 ERA while batting .440 with 32 RBIs. He earned All-State honorable mention. He was not drafted in the 2012 Major League Baseball draft, and he enrolled at the University of South Alabama where he played college baseball.

Peacock redshirted and did not make an appearance during his freshman year in 2013. In 2014, as a redshirt freshman, he made eight relief appearances in which he went 0–1 with a 6.10 ERA. As a redshirt sophomore in 2015, he pitched in only three games. Peacock underwent surgery on his throwing arm in 2016, and he did not make an appearance that season, instead choosing to work at his uncle's sawmill. He returned to the mound in 2017, and moved into the closer role. Over 25 relief appearances, he went 3–3 with a 2.88 ERA, ten saves, and 55 strikeouts over fifty innings.

== Professional career ==
=== Arizona Diamondbacks ===
Following the season, Peacock was selected by the Arizona Diamondbacks in the 23rd round of the 2017 Major League Baseball draft. He made his professional debut with the Hillsboro Hops, going 0–2 with a 2.45 ERA over 22 relief appearances. In 2018, Peacock began the season with the Kane County Cougars (with whom he was named a Midwest League All-Star) before being promoted to the Visalia Rawhide. Over 28 games (16 starts) between the two clubs, he pitched to a 7–6 record and a 4.20 ERA. He spent 2019 with the Jackson Generals with whom he pitched to an 8–4 record and 2.97 ERA over 21 games (twenty starts). Peacock did not play a minor league game in 2020 due to the cancellation of the minor league season caused by the COVID-19 pandemic. The Diamondbacks added him to their 40-man roster after the 2020 season.

On April 6, 2021, Peacock was promoted to the major leagues for the first time to fill in for the injured Joakim Soria. He made his MLB debut that night against the Colorado Rockies, picking up his first MLB win in a 13-inning victory. In the game, he also recorded his first MLB hit off of Rockies reliever Ben Bowden, becoming the first pitcher since 1945 to make his debut in extra innings and record his first hit and win. Peacock pitched a total of 86 1/3 innings for the Diamondbacks, going 5–7 with a 4.90 ERA and fifty strikeouts. He was designated for assignment on April 21, 2022.

=== Kansas City Royals ===
On April 24, 2022, the Diamondbacks traded Peacock to the Kansas City Royals in exchange for cash considerations. Peacock spent brief time in the Royals’ minor league system, appearing in games for the Double-A Northwest Arkansas Naturals and the Triple-A Omaha Storm Chasers. Appearing in seven games for Kansas City, he logged a 4.91 ERA with four strikeouts in 7 1/3 innings pitched. On July 1, Peacock was designated for assignment by the Royals following the waiver claim of Ryan Weiss.

=== Toronto Blue Jays ===
On July 6, 2022, Peacock was claimed off waivers by the Toronto Blue Jays. He was designated for assignment on August 9. He was sent outright to Triple-A on August 12.

Peacock spent the 2023 season with the Triple–A Buffalo Bisons, and also played in one game for the Single–A Dunedin Blue Jays. In 20 appearances for Buffalo, he recorded a 6.46 ERA with 19 strikeouts and two saves across 23 2/3 innings pitched. Peacock elected free agency following the season on November 6, 2023.
