= Henry Ramos (baseball) =

Puerto Rican baseball player (born 1992)

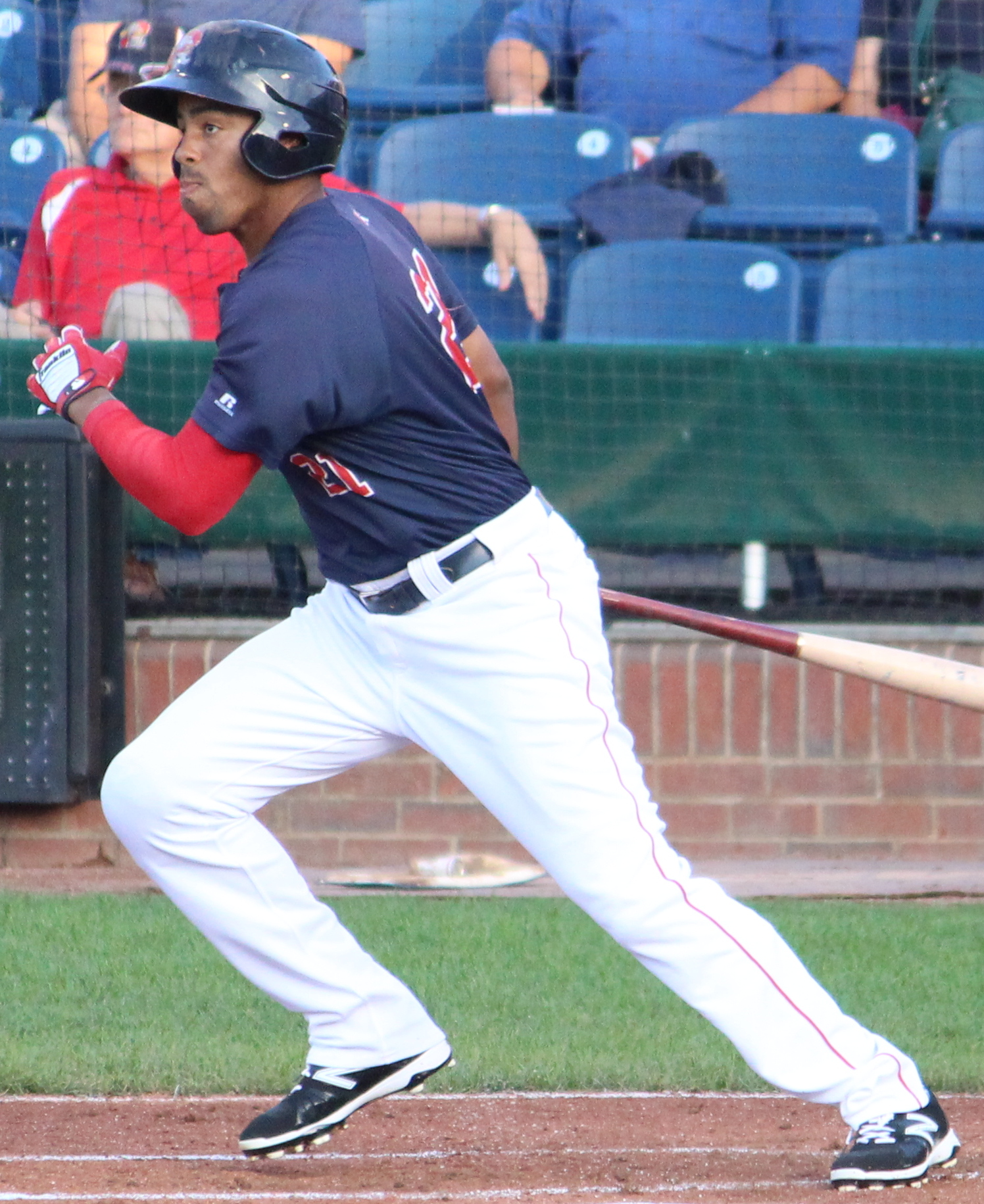
- Ramos with the Portland Sea Dogs in 2015

Pericos de Puebla – No. 19
- Outfielder
- Born: April 15, 1992 (age 34); Maunabo, Puerto Rico
- Bats: Switch Throws: Right

Professional debut
- MLB: September 5, 2021, for the Arizona Diamondbacks
- KBO: April 2, 2022, for the KT Wiz

MLB statistics (through 2023 season)
- Batting average: .226
- Home runs: 1
- Runs batted in: 13

KBO statistics (through 2024 season)
- Batting average: .295
- Home runs: 13
- Runs batted in: 59
- Stats at Baseball Reference

Teams
- Arizona Diamondbacks (2021); KT Wiz (2022); Cincinnati Reds (2023); Doosan Bears (2024)

Henry Ramos (born April 15, 1992) is a Puerto Rican professional baseball outfielder for the Pericos de Puebla of the Mexican League. He has previously played in Major League Baseball (MLB) for the Arizona Diamondbacks and Cincinnati Reds, and in the KBO League for the KT Wiz and Doosan Bears.

== Career ==
=== Boston Red Sox ===
Ramos attended Alfonso Casta Martinez High School in Maunabo, Puerto Rico. He was drafted the Boston Red Sox in the 5th round, with the 173rd overall selection, of the 2010 Major League Baseball draft.

Ramos split the 2010 season between the rookie–level Gulf Coast League Red Sox and the Low–A Lowell Spinners, hitting a combined .281/.341/.400 with three home runs and 28 RBI. He spent the 2011 and 2012 seasons with the Single–A Greenville Drive; hitting .262/.299/.383 with five home runs and 43 RBI in 2011, and .254/.327/.381 with eight home runs and 63 RBI in 2012. Ramos spent the 2013 season with the High–A Salem Red Sox, hitting .252/.330/.416 with 12 home runs and 55 RBI. His 2014 season was spent with the Double–A Portland Sea Dogs, hitting .326/.368/.431 with two home runs and 23 RBI, but playing in only 43 games due to a stress fracture in his left leg. Ramos split the 2015 season between the GCL Red Sox, Lowell, and Portland, hitting a combined .228/.308/.315 with one home run and 10 RBI. He split the 2016 season between Portland and the Triple–A Pawtucket Red Sox, hitting a combined .263/.306/.402 with eight home runs and 40 RBI. He became a free agent following the season on November 7, 2016.

=== Los Angeles Dodgers ===
Ramos signed a minor league contract with the Los Angeles Dodgers on November 28, 2016. He split the 2017 season between the Double–A Tulsa Drillers and Triple–A Oklahoma City Dodgers, hitting a combined .351/.396/.546 with eight home runs and 25 RBI. He spent the 2018 season with OKC, hitting .297/.352/.465 with 10 home runs and 58 RBI. Ramos became a free agent following the season on November 2, 2018.

=== San Francisco Giants ===
On January 24, 2019, Ramos signed a minor league contract with the San Francisco Giants organization. He played in 96 games for the game Triple-A Sacramento River Cats, hitting .269/.319/.439 with 12 home runs and 40 RBI. He was released by the organization on August 2.

=== Texas Rangers ===
On January 2, 2020, Ramos signed a minor league contract with the Texas Rangers organization. He did not play in a game in 2020 due to the cancellation of the minor league season because of the COVID-19 pandemic. Ramos became a free agent on November 2.

=== Arizona Diamondbacks ===
On May 19, 2021, Ramos signed a minor league contract with the Arizona Diamondbacks organization. He was assigned to the Triple-A Reno Aces, hitting .371/.439/.582 with 12 home runs and 57 RBI. On September 5, Arizona selected his contract and promoted him to the major leagues for the first time. He made his MLB debut that day as a pinch hitter in the seventh inning of a game against the Seattle Mariners. Ramos collected his first career hit in that at–bat with a single off of Mariners reliever Erik Swanson. Ramos was outrighted off of the 40-man roster on October 7.

=== KT Wiz ===
On December 1, 2021, Ramos signed with the KT Wiz of the KBO League. In 2022, Ramos appeared in 18 games, hitting .250/.304/.417 with 3 home runs, 11 RBI, and 2 stolen bases before suffering a toe fracture on April 23. He was released by the team on May 26, when KT signed Anthony Alford.

=== Cincinnati Reds ===
On January 9, 2023, Ramos signed a minor league deal with the Cincinnati Reds. He was assigned to the Triple-A Louisville Bats to begin the year, where he hit .314/.400/.486 with 2 home runs, 7 RBI, and 3 stolen bases in 11 games. On April 24, Ramos had his contract selected to the active roster and was slotted into the lineup as the designated hitter for that day's game against the Texas Rangers. In 18 games for the Reds he hit .242/.356/.307 with 4 RBI and 2 stolen bases. On July 8, Ramos was designated for assignment following the promotion of Michael Mariot. He cleared waivers and was sent outright to Triple–A Louisville on July 10. On August 11, Ramos had his contract selected back to the major league roster. He was designated for assignment again on August 22. Ramos was again sent outright to Louisville after clearing waivers on August 24. On October 10, Ramos elected free agency.

=== Doosan Bears ===
On December 21, 2023, Ramos signed a one-year, $600,000 contract with the Doosan Bears of the KBO League. He played in 80 games for Doosan in 2024, slashing 306/.360/.482 with 10 home runs and 48 RBI. Ramos was released by the Bears on July 23, 2024.

=== Leones de Yucatán ===
On December 6, 2024, Ramos signed with the Leones de Yucatán of the Mexican League for the 2025 season. In 75 games, he hit .317/.386/.474 with nine home runs, 49 RBI, and five stolen bases.

In 2026, Ramos slashed .308/.401/.463 with four home runs and 37 RBI across 65 games.

=== Pericos de Puebla ===
On July 14, 2026, Ramos was traded to the Pericos de Puebla of the Mexican League.

== Personal life ==
His older brother, Héctor Ramos, is a professional soccer player and the all-time top scorer of the Puerto Rican national team. His younger brother, Heliot Ramos, is also a professional baseball player.
