= 2020 Colorado Rockies season =

Major League Baseball shortened 60-game season

2020 Colorado Rockies
- League: National League
- Division: West
- Ballpark: Coors Field
- City: Denver, Colorado
- Record: 26–34 (.433)
- Divisional place: 4th
- Owners: Charles & Richard Monfort
- General manager: Jeff Bridich
- Manager: Bud Black
- Television: AT&T Sportsnet Rocky Mountain (Drew Goodman, Jeff Huson, Ryan Spilborghs)
- Radio: KOA (English); Colorado Rockies Radio Network (Jack Corrigan, Mike Rice); KNRV (Spanish) (Salvador Hernandez, Javier Olivas, Carlos Valdez)
- Stats: ESPN.com; Baseball Reference

The 2020 Colorado Rockies season was the franchise's 28th in Major League Baseball. It was their 26th season at Coors Field. Bud Black returned as the Manager for his fourth season with the Rockies in 2020.

On March 12, 2020, MLB announced that because of the COVID-19 pandemic, the start of the regular season would be delayed by at least two weeks in addition to the remainder of preseason being cancelled. Four days later, it was announced that the start of the season would be pushed back indefinitely due to the recommendation made by the CDC to restrict events of more than 50 people for eight weeks. On June 23, commissioner Rob Manfred unilaterally implemented a 60-game season. Players reported to training camps on July 1 in order to resume spring training and prepare for a July 24 Opening Day.

The Rockies started the season 11–3, but would lose the remaining 31 of 45 games. The team's biggest achievement was being the only team to beat the eventual World Series champion Dodgers in a series in 2020, as they won two out of three at Dodger Stadium in early September.

== Regular season ==
=== Season standings ===
==== National League West ====
NL West
Team	W	L	Pct.	GB	Home	Road
Los Angeles Dodgers	43	17	.717	—	21‍–‍9	22‍–‍8
San Diego Padres	37	23	.617	6	21‍–‍11	16‍–‍12
San Francisco Giants	29	31	.483	14	19‍–‍14	10‍–‍17
Colorado Rockies	26	34	.433	17	12‍–‍18	14‍–‍16
Arizona Diamondbacks	25	35	.417	18	16‍–‍14	9‍–‍21

==== National League Wild Card ====
Division leaders
Team	W	L	Pct.
Los Angeles Dodgers	43	17	.717
Atlanta Braves	35	25	.583
Chicago Cubs	34	26	.567

Division 2nd place
Team	W	L	Pct.
San Diego Padres	37	23	.617
St. Louis Cardinals	30	28	.517
Miami Marlins	31	29	.517

Wild Card teams (Top 2 teams qualify for postseason)
Team	W	L	Pct.	GB
Cincinnati Reds	31	29	.517	+2
Milwaukee Brewers	29	31	.483	—
San Francisco Giants	29	31	.483	—
Philadelphia Phillies	28	32	.467	1
Washington Nationals	26	34	.433	3
New York Mets	26	34	.433	3
Colorado Rockies	26	34	.433	3
Arizona Diamondbacks	25	35	.417	4
Pittsburgh Pirates	19	41	.317	10

=== Record vs. opponents ===
2020 National League record Source: MLB Standings Grid – 2020
Team	AZ	COL	LAD	SD	SF	AL
Arizona	—	5–5	2–8	5–5	2–8	11–9
Colorado	5–5	—	3–7	3–7	6–4	9–11
Los Angeles	8–2	7–3	—	6–4	6–4	16–4
San Diego	5–5	7–3	4–6	—	8–2	13–7
San Francisco	8–2	4–6	4–6	2–8	—	11–9

=== Detailed records ===
National League West
Opponent	Total	Home	Away	RS	RA
Arizona Diamondbacks	5–5	1–2	4–3	57	74
Colorado Rockies	–	–	–	–	–
Los Angeles Dodgers	3–7	1–3	2–4	41	61
San Diego Padres	3–7	3–4	0–3	40	67
San Francisco Giants	6–4	4–2	2–2	51	63
Total	17–23	9–11	8–12	189	275

American League West
Opponent	Total	Home	Away	RS	RA
Houston Astros	0–4	0–2	0–2	16	27
Los Angeles Angels	1–2	1–2	–	13	14
Oakland Athletics	3–1	1–1	2–0	17	8
Seattle Mariners	2–1	–	2–1	16	9
Texas Rangers	3–3	1–2	2–1	24	20
Total	9–11	3–7	6–4	86	78

=== Transactions ===
- August 14, 2020: Jesús Tinoco was traded by the Rockies to the Miami Marlins in exchange for Chad Smith (minors).
- August 30, 2020: Mychal Givens was traded by the Baltimore Orioles to the Colorado Rockies in exchange for Tyler Nevin (minors), Terrin Vavra (minors), and a player to be named later.
- August 31, 2020: Kevin Pillar was traded by the Boston Red Sox to the Colorado Rockies in exchange for a player to be named later and international bonus pool money.

== Game log ==
2020 game log: 26–34 (Home: 12–18; Away: 14–16 )
July: 4–2 (Home: 0–1; Away: 4–1 )

#	Date	Opponent	Score	Win	Loss	Save	Record	Streak
1	July 24	@ Rangers	0–1	Lynn (1–0)	**Márquez** (0–1)	Leclerc (1)	0–1	L1
2	July 25	@ Rangers	3–2	**Bard** (1–0)	Minor (0–1)	**Davis** (1)	1–1	W1
3	July 26	@ Rangers	5–2	**Freeland** (1–0)	Palumbo (0–1)	**Davis** (2)	2–1	W2
4	July 28	@ Athletics	8–3	**Senzatela** (1–0)	Mengden (0–1)	—	3–1	W3
5	July 29	@ Athletics	5–1	**Márquez** (1–1)	Montas (0–1)	—	4–1	W4
6	July 31	Padres	7–8	Stammen (1–1)	**Davis** (0–1)	Pomeranz (2)	4–2	L1

August: 13–16 (Home: 8–10; Away: 5–6 )

#	Date	Opponent	Score	Win	Loss	Save	Record	Streak
7	August 1	Padres	6–1	**Freeland** (2–0)	Lucchesi (0–1)	—	5–2	W1
8	August 2	Padres	9–6	**Senzatela** (2–0)	Davies (1–1)	**Díaz** (1)	6–2	W2
9	August 3	Giants	7–6	**Hoffman** (1–0)	Peralta (1–1)	**Díaz** (2)	7–2	W3
10	August 4	Giants	5–2	**Márquez** (2–1)	Gausman (0–1)	**Almonte** (1)	8–2	W4
11	August 5	Giants	3–4	Webb (1–0)	**Gray** (0–1)	Gott (3)	8–3	L1
12	August 6	Giants	6–4	**Almonte** (1–0)	Garcia (0–1)	**Díaz** (3)	9–3	W1
13	August 7	@ Mariners	8–4	**Senzatela** (3–0)	Kikuchi (0–1)	—	10–3	W2
14	August 8	@ Mariners	5–0	**Hoffman** (2–0)	Misiewicz (0–1)	—	11–3	W3
15	August 9	@ Mariners	3–5	Sheffield (1–2)	**Márquez** (2–2)	Williams (3)	11–4	L1
16	August 10	Diamondbacks	8–12	Young (1–0)	**Gray** (0–2)	Bradley (4)	11–5	L2
17	August 11	Diamondbacks	8–7	**Estévez** (1–0)	Ginkel (0–1)	**Bard** (1)	12–5	W1
18	August 12	Diamondbacks	7–13	Chafin (1–1)	**Kinley** (0–1)	—	12–6	L1
19	August 14	Rangers	2–3	Lynn (3–0)	**Bard** (1–1)	—	12–7	L2
20	August 15	Rangers	4–6	Gibson (1–2)	**Márquez** (2–3)	Montero (5)	12–8	L3
21	August 16	Rangers	10–6	**Gray** (1–2)	Allard (0–1)	**Estévez** (1)	13–8	W1
22	August 17	@ Astros	1–2	Bielak (3–0)	**Freeland** (2–1)	Taylor (1)	13–9	L1
23	August 18	@ Astros	1–2 (11)	Scrubb (1–0)	**Díaz** (0–1)	—	13–10	L2
24	August 19	Astros	6–13	Valdez (2–2)	**Castellani** (0–1)	—	13–11	L3
25	August 20	Astros	8–10	Raley (1–0)	**Márquez** (2–4)	Pressly (3)	13–12	L4
26	August 21	@ Dodgers	1–5	Buehler (1–0)	**Gray** (1–3)	—	13–13	L5
27	August 22	@ Dodgers	3–4	Jansen (1–0)	**Bard** (1–2)	—	13–14	L6
28	August 23	@ Dodgers	3–11	González (1–0)	**Senzatela** (3–1)	—	13–15	L7
29	August 24	@ Diamondbacks	3–2	**Castellani** (1–1)	Widener (0–1)	**Bard** (2)	14–15	W1
30	August 25	@ Diamondbacks	5–4	**Díaz** (1–1)	Crichton (2–1)	**Bard** (3)	15–15	W2
31	August 26	@ Diamondbacks	8–7	**Gray** (2–3)	Ray (1–4)	**Hoffman** (1)	16–15	W3
—	August 27	@ Diamondbacks	Postponed (Boycotts due to Jacob Blake shooting); Makeup: September 25					
32	August 28	Padres	4–10	Davies (5–2)	**Hoffman** (2–1)	—	16–16	L1
33	August 29	Padres	4–3	**Bard** (2–2)	Stammen (3–2)	—	17–16	W1
34	August 30	Padres	2–13	Paddack (3–3)	**Castellani** (1–2)	—	17–17	L1
35	August 31	Padres	0–6	Morejón (1–0)	**Márquez** (2–5)	—	17–18	L2

September: 9–16 (Home: 4–7; Away: 5–9 )

#	Date	Opponent	Score	Win	Loss	Save	Record	Streak
36	September 1	Giants	5–23	Gausman (2–2)	**Gray** (2–4)	—	17–19	L3
37	September 2	Giants	9–6	**Givens** (1–1)	Coonrod (0–1)	**Bard** (4)	18–19	W1
38	September 4	@ Dodgers	6–10	Ferguson (2–0)	**Estévez** (1–1)	—	18–20	L1
39	September 5	@ Dodgers	5–2	**Almonte** (2–0)	Treinen (3–2)	**Bard** (5)	19–20	W1
40	September 6	@ Dodgers	7–6	**Almonte** (3–0)	Ferguson (2–1)	**Bard** (6)	20–20	W2
41	September 7	@ Padres	0–1	Pomeranz (1–0)	**Estévez** (1–2)	—	20–21	L1
42	September 8	@ Padres	5–14	Clevinger (2–2)	**Gonzalez** (0–1)	—	20–22	L2
43	September 9	@ Padres	3–5	Davies (7–2)	**Senzatela** (3–2)	Rosenthal (9)	20–23	L3
44	September 11	Angels	8–4	**Bard** (3–2)	Buttrey (1–3)	—	21–23	W1
45	September 12	Angels	2–5 (11)	Buttrey (2–3)	**Kinley** (0–2)	Andriese (1)	21–24	L1
46	September 13	Angels	3–5	Heaney (4–3)	**Estévez** (1–3)	Andriese (2)	21–25	L2
47	September 15	Athletics	3–1	**Senzatela** (4–2)	Manaea (4–3)	—	22–25	W1
48	September 16	Athletics	1–3	Fiers (6–2)	**Márquez** (2–6)	Hendriks (13)	22–26	L1
49	September 17	Dodgers	3–9	Floro (2–0)	**Freeland** (2–2)	—	22–27	L2
50	September 18	Dodgers	6–15	White (1–0)	**Castellani** (1–3)	—	22–28	L3
51	September 19	Dodgers	1–6	Kershaw (6–2)	**Gonzalez** (0–2)	—	22–29	L4
52	September 20	Dodgers	6–3	**Senzatela** (5–2)	Gonsolin (1–2)	**Givens** (1)	23–29	W1
53	September 21	@ Giants	7–2	**Márquez** (3–6)	Cueto (2–2	—	24–29	W2
54	September 22	@ Giants	2–5	Rogers (3–3)	**Díaz** (1–2)	Coonrod (3)	24–30	L1
55	September 23	@ Giants	2–7	Webb (3–4)	**Castellani** (1–4)	—	24–31	L2
56	September 24	@ Giants	5–4 (11)	**Bard** (4–2)	Cahill (1–2)	**Díaz** (4)	25–31	W1
57	September 25 (1)	@ Diamondbacks	0–4 (7)	Gallen (3–2)	**Senzatela** (5–3)	Crichton (5)	25–32	L1
58	September 25 (2)	@ Diamondbacks	5–11 (7)	Clarke (3–0)	**Santos** (0–1)	—	25–33	L2
59	September 26	@ Diamondbacks	10–3	**Márquez** (4–6)	Weaver (1–9)	—	26–33	W1
60	September 27	@ Diamondbacks	3–11	Bumgarner (1–4)	**Freeland** (2–3)	—	26–34	L1

Legend: = Win = Loss = Postponement
Bold = Rockies team member

== Roster ==
2020 Colorado Rockies
Roster
Pitchers: 62 Yency Almonte; 52 Daniel Bard; 38,60 Ryan Castellani; 71 Wade Davis; 37 Jairo Díaz; 64 Phil Diehl; 59 Tommy Doyle; 54 Carlos Estévez; 21 Kyle Freeland; 60 Mychal Givens; 50 Chi Chi Gonzalez; 56 Ashton Goudeau; 55 Jon Gray; 30 Joe Harvey; 34 Jeff Hoffman; 40 Tyler Kinley; 48 Germán Márquez; 44 José Mujica; 47 James Pazos; 51 A. J. Ramos; 46 Antonio Santos; 49 Antonio Senzatela; 32 Jesús Tinoco	Catchers: 6 Drew Butera; 35 Elías Díaz; 14 Tony Wolters; Infielders: 28 Nolan Arenado; 8 Josh Fuentes; 1 Garrett Hampson; 24 Ryan McMahon; 9 Daniel Murphy; 12 Chris Owings; 7 Brendan Rodgers; 27 Trevor Story	Outfielders: 19 Charlie Blackmon; 26 David Dahl; 22 Sam Hilliard; 25 Matt Kemp; 11 Kevin Pillar; 15 Raimel Tapia	Manager: 10 Bud Black; Coaches: 39 Stu Cole (third base); 75 Kyle Cunningham (bullpen catcher); 36 Steve Foster (pitching); 53 Ron Gideon (first base); 16 Dave Magadan (hitting); 77 Aaron Muñoz (bullpen catcher); 11,32 Mike Redmond (bench); 41 Jeff Salazar (assistant hitting); 31 Darryl Scott (bullpen)

== Player stats ==
=== Batting ===
List does not include pitchers. Stats in bold are the team leaders.

Note: G = Games played; AB = At bats; R = Runs; H = Hits; 2B = Doubles; 3B = Triples; HR = Home runs; RBI = Runs batted in; BB = Walks; SO = Strikeouts; AVG = Batting average; OBP = On-base percentage; SLG = Slugging; OPS = On Base + Slugging

Player	G	AB	R	H	2B	3B	HR	RBI	BB	SO	AVG	OBP	SLG	OPS
Trevor Story	**59**	**235**	**41**	**68**	**13**	**4**	**11**	28	**24**	63	.289	.355	**.519**	**.874**
Charlie Blackmon	**59**	221	31	67	12	1	6	**42**	19	44	.303	.356	.448	.804
Raimel Tapia	51	184	26	59	8	2	1	17	14	38	**.321**	**.369**	.402	.772
Nolan Arenado	48	182	23	46	9	0	8	26	15	20	.253	.303	.434	.738
Ryan McMahon	52	172	23	37	6	1	9	26	18	**66**	.215	.295	.419	.714
Garrett Hampson	53	167	25	39	4	3	5	11	13	60	.234	.287	.383	.671
Daniel Murphy	40	123	10	29	3	0	3	16	7	21	.236	.275	.333	.608
Matt Kemp	43	117	18	28	3	0	6	21	15	41	.239	.326	.419	.745
Sam Hilliard	36	105	13	22	2	2	6	10	9	42	.210	.272	.438	.710
Tony Wolters	42	100	10	23	4	0	0	8	6	30	.230	.280	.270	.550
Josh Fuentes	30	98	14	30	7	0	2	17	2	29	.306	.320	.439	.759
David Dahl	24	93	9	17	2	2	0	9	4	28	.183	.222	.247	.470
Kevin Pillar	24	91	14	28	5	1	2	13	5	18	.308	.351	.451	.801
Elías Díaz	26	68	4	16	2	0	2	9	5	15	.235	.288	.353	.641
Chris Owings	17	41	9	11	1	0	2	5	3	11	.268	.318	.439	.757
Drew Butera	28	39	4	6	2	0	0	4	2	11	.154	.190	.205	.396
Brendan Rodgers	7	21	1	2	1	0	0	2	0	6	.095	.095	.143	.238
**Team totals**	**60**	**2057**	**275**	**528**	**84**	**16**	**63**	**264**	**161**	**543**	**.257**	**.311**	**.405**	**.716**

=== Pitching ===
List does not include position players. Stats in bold are the team leaders.

Note: W = Wins; L = Losses; ERA = Earned run average; G = Games pitched; GS = Games started; SV = Saves; IP = Innings pitched; R = Runs allowed; ER = Earned runs allowed; BB = Walks allowed; K = Strikeouts

Player	W	L	ERA	G	GS	SV	IP	H	R	ER	BB	K
Germán Márquez	4	**6**	3.75	13	**13**	0	**81.2**	**78**	**41**	**34**	25	**73**
Antonio Senzatela	**5**	3	**3.44**	12	12	0	73.1	71	29	28	18	41
Kyle Freeland	2	3	4.33	13	13	0	70.2	77	34	**34**	23	46
Ryan Castellani	1	4	5.82	10	9	0	43.1	37	30	28	**26**	25
Jon Gray	2	4	6.69	8	8	0	39.0	45	31	29	11	22
Yency Almonte	3	0	2.93	24	0	1	27.2	25	13	9	6	23
Daniel Bard	4	2	3.65	23	0	**6**	24.2	22	10	10	10	27
Carlos Estévez	1	3	7.50	**26**	0	1	24.0	33	21	20	9	27
Tyler Kinley	0	2	5.32	24	0	0	23.2	13	15	14	12	26
Jeff Hoffman	2	1	9.28	16	0	1	21.1	32	23	22	9	20
Jairo Díaz	1	2	7.65	24	0	4	20.0	31	21	17	14	17
Chi Chi Gonzalez	0	2	6.86	6	4	0	19.2	22	16	15	10	16
Mychal Givens	1	0	6.75	10	0	1	9.1	9	8	7	4	6
Ashton Goudeau	0	0	7.56	4	0	0	8.1	15	7	7	2	2
Antonio Santos	0	1	16.50	3	1	0	6.0	14	11	11	4	4
Phillip Diehl	0	0	10.50	6	0	0	6.0	7	7	7	1	4
James Pazos	0	0	16.88	6	0	0	5.1	10	10	10	5	1
José Mujica	0	0	12.46	2	0	0	4.1	10	7	6	2	1
Wade Davis	0	1	20.77	5	0	2	4.1	9	10	10	3	3
Jesús Tinoco	0	0	2.45	3	0	0	3.2	3	1	1	4	3
Joe Harvey	0	0	0.00	4	0	0	3.1	3	0	0	0	2
A. J. Ramos	0	0	3.38	3	0	0	2.2	4	1	1	3	1
Tommy Doyle	0	0	23.14	3	0	0	2.1	6	6	6	4	2
**Team totals**	**26**	**34**	**5.59**	**60**	**60**	**16**	**526.1**	**579**	**353**	**327**	**205**	**393**

== Farm system ==
Level	Team	League	Manager
AAA	Albuquerque Isotopes	Pacific Coast League	Glenallen Hill
AA	Hartford Yard Goats	Eastern League	Warren Schaeffer
A-Advanced	Lancaster JetHawks	California League	Scott Little
A	Asheville Tourists	South Atlantic League	Robinson Cancel
A-Short Season	Boise Hawks	Northwest League	Steve Soliz
Rookie	Grand Junction Rockies	Pioneer League	Jake Opitz

Records
Preceded by 2019	Colorado Rockies seasons 2020	Succeeded by 2021
