= 2020 San Diego Padres season =

Major League Baseball shortened 60-game season

2020 San Diego Padres
- National League West 2nd Place
- League: National League
- Division: West
- Ballpark: Petco Park
- City: San Diego, California
- Record: 37–23 (.617)
- Divisional place: 2nd
- Owners: Ron Fowler
- General managers: A. J. Preller
- Managers: Jayce Tingler
- Television: Fox Sports San Diego (Don Orsillo, Mark Grant, Mike Pomeranz, Mark Sweeney, Jesse Agler); Fox Deportes San Diego (Spanish)
- Radio: KWFN 97.3 FM (Ted Leitner, Jesse Agler); XEMO 860 AM (Spanish) (Eduardo Ortega, Carlos Hernandez, Pedro Gutierrez)

The 2020 San Diego Padres season was the 52nd season of the San Diego Padres franchise, the 52nd in the National League and the Padres' 17th Season at Petco Park. The Padres were managed by Jayce Tingler, in his first season as the Padres Manager, and played their home games at Petco Park as members of Major League Baseball's National League West.

On March 12, 2020, MLB announced that because of the ongoing COVID-19 pandemic, the start of the regular season would be delayed by at least two weeks in addition to the remainder of spring training being cancelled. Four days later, it was announced that the start of the season would be pushed back indefinitely due to the recommendation made by the CDC to restrict events of more than 50 people for eight weeks.

On June 23, commissioner Rob Manfred unilaterally implemented a 60-game season. Players reported to training camps on July 1 in order to resume spring training and prepare for a July 24 Opening Day.

The team earned the nickname 'Slam Diego' after a four-game winning stretch against the Texas Rangers in August with two games at each stadium, the Padres had one grand-slam homer in each win -- becoming the first team in major league history to hit grand slams in four straight games.

On September 13, the Padres won their 31st game of the season, ensuring that they would finish with a winning record for the first time since 2010. On September 20, the Padres beat the Seattle Mariners 4–1 to clinch their first postseason appearance since 2006. They defeated the St. Louis Cardinals in the NLWCS. The Padres won their first postseason series since the 1998 NLCS. Game 2 of their NLWCS was also the first home postseason win since Petco Park opened and since Game 4 of the aforementioned 1998 NLCS. The Padres winning Game 3 of the NLWCS also clinched their first postseason series at home since Game 5 of the 1984 NLCS (also a winner-take-all game). The Padres were defeated by the eventual World Series champions Los Angeles Dodgers in the NLDS at Globe Life Field.

== Previous season ==
The Padres finished the 2019 Season 70–92 in fifth place in the West Division. The Padres extended its 10-year streak of a losing record and a 15-year nonplayoff streak.

== Offseason ==
- October 31: Craig Stammen, Adam Warren, Robbie Erlin, and Aaron Loup all elect free agency.
- October 31: Padres trade Travis Jankowski to Reds for future considerations.
- November 4: Padres designates Jacob Nix, Seth Mejias-Brean, Carl Edwards Jr., and Eric Yardley for assignment.
- November 20: Padres designated Nick Martini for assignment.
- November 20: Padres selected the contract of Jorge Ona from Amarillo Sod Poodles.
- November 27: Padres traded player to be named later, Eric Lauer and Luis Urias to Brewers for Trent Grisham and Zach Davies.
- November 27: Padres designated Pedro Avila for assignment.
- November 27: Padres signed free agent Drew Pomeranz.
- December 2: Padres traded Austin Allen and player to be named later to Athletics for Jurickson Profar.
- December 6: Padres traded Hunter Renfroe, Xavier Edwards, and player to be named later to Rays for Tommy Pham and Jake Cronenworth.
- December 23: Padres signed free agent Pierce Johnson.
- January 17: Padres signed free agent Craig Stammen.
- February 8: Padres traded Manuel Margot and Logan Driscoll to Rays for Emilio Pagan
- February 12: Padres claimed 2B Breyvic Valera off waivers from Blue Jays.

== Season standings ==
=== National League West ===
NL West
Team	W	L	Pct.	GB	Home	Road
Los Angeles Dodgers	43	17	.717	—	21‍–‍9	22‍–‍8
San Diego Padres	37	23	.617	6	21‍–‍11	16‍–‍12
San Francisco Giants	29	31	.483	14	19‍–‍14	10‍–‍17
Colorado Rockies	26	34	.433	17	12‍–‍18	14‍–‍16
Arizona Diamondbacks	25	35	.417	18	16‍–‍14	9‍–‍21

=== National League Wild Card ===
Division leaders
Team	W	L	Pct.
Los Angeles Dodgers	43	17	.717
Atlanta Braves	35	25	.583
Chicago Cubs	34	26	.567

Division 2nd place
Team	W	L	Pct.
San Diego Padres	37	23	.617
St. Louis Cardinals	30	28	.517
Miami Marlins	31	29	.517

Wild Card teams (Top 2 teams qualify for postseason)
Team	W	L	Pct.	GB
Cincinnati Reds	31	29	.517	+2
Milwaukee Brewers	29	31	.483	—
San Francisco Giants	29	31	.483	—
Philadelphia Phillies	28	32	.467	1
Washington Nationals	26	34	.433	3
New York Mets	26	34	.433	3
Colorado Rockies	26	34	.433	3
Arizona Diamondbacks	25	35	.417	4
Pittsburgh Pirates	19	41	.317	10

=== Record vs. opponents ===
2020 National League record Source: MLB Standings Grid – 2020
Team}}WSHSTL!style="background-color: #A71930 !important; color: #FFFFFF !important; box-shadow: inset 2px 2px 0 #E3D4AD, inset -2px -2px 0 #E3D4AD; !important; width:35px;"	AL					
Arizona	—	5–5	2–8	5–5	2–8	11–9
Colorado	5–5	—	3–7	3–7	6–4	9–11
Los Angeles	8–2	7–3	—	6–4	6–4	16–4
San Diego	5–5	7–3	4–6	—	8–2	13–7
San Francisco	8–2	4–6	4–6	2–8	—	11–9

=== Game log ===
On April 18–19, the Padres were supposed to play against the Arizona Diamondbacks in the Mexico Series in Mexico City. But due to the pandemic, the MLB cancelled the series.

2020 game log: 37–23 (Home: 20–10; Away: 17–13)
July: 6–2 (Home: 3–1; Away: 3–1)

#	Date	Opponent	Score	Win	Loss	Save	Record	Streak
1	July 24	Diamondbacks	7–2	**Paddack** (1–0)	Bumgarner (0–1)	—	1–0	W1
2	July 25	Diamondbacks	5–1	**Lamet** (1–0)	Ray (0–1)	—	2–0	W2
3	July 26	Diamondbacks	3–4	Bradley (1–0)	**Yates** (0–1)	—	2–1	L1
4	July 27	Diamondbacks	6–2	**Quantrill** (1–0)	Weaver (0–1)	—	3–1	W1
5	July 28	@ Giants	5–3	**Davies** (1–0)	Samardzija (0–1)	**Pomeranz** (1)	4–1	W2
6	July 29	@ Giants	6–7	Rogers (1–1)	**Strahm** (0–1)	—	4–2	L1
7	July 30	@ Giants	12–7 (10)	**Johnson** (1–0)	Rogers (1–2)	—	5–2	W1
8	July 31	@ Rockies	8–7	**Stammen** (1–1)	Davis (0–1)	**Pomeranz** (2)	6–2	W2

August: 16–13 (Home: 9–5; Away: 7–8)

#	Date	Opponent	Score	Win	Loss	Save	Record	Streak
9	August 1	@ Rockies	1–6	Freeland (2–0)	**Lucchesi** (0–1)	—	6–3	L1
10	August 2	@ Rockies	6–9	Senzatela (2–0)	**Davies** (1–1)	Díaz (1)	6–4	L2
11	August 3	Dodgers	5–4	**Paddack** (2–0)	Graterol (1–2)	**Yates** (1)	7–4	W1
12	August 4	Dodgers	2–5	May (1–0)	**Stammen** (1–1)	Jansen (3)	7–5	L1
13	August 5	Dodgers	6–7	Stripling (3–0)	**Richards** (0–1)	Jansen (4)	7–6	L2
14	August 7	Diamondbacks	3–0	**Davies** (2–1)	Weaver (0–3)	**Yates** (2)	8–6	W1
15	August 8	Diamondbacks	2–3	Kelly (2–1)	**Paddack** (2–1)	Bradley (3)	8–7	L1
16	August 9	Diamondbacks	9–5	**Lamet** (2–0)	Bumgarner (0–3)	—	9–7	W1
17	August 10	@ Dodgers	2–1	**Quantrill** (2–0)	May (1–1)	**Pomeranz** (3)	10–7	W2
18	August 11	@ Dodgers	6–2	**Richards** (1–1)	Stripling (3–1)	**Pomeranz** (4)	11–7	W3
19	August 12	@ Dodgers	0–6	Treinen (1–1)	**Davies** (2–2)	—	11–8	L1
20	August 13	@ Dodgers	2–11	Urías (2–0)	**Paddack** (2–2)	—	11–9	L2
21	August 14	@ Diamondbacks	1–5	Kelly (3–1)	**Lamet** (2–1)	—	11–10	L3
22	August 15	@ Diamondbacks	6–7	Crichton (1–0)	**Johnson** (1–1)	Bradley (5)	11–11	L4
23	August 16	@ Diamondbacks	4–5	Clarke (1–0)	**Pagán** (0–1)	Bradley (6)	11–12	L5
24	August 17	@ Rangers	14–4	**Davies** (3–2)	Lyles (1–2)	—	12–12	W1
25	August 18	@ Rangers	6–4	**Stammen** (2–1)	Minor (0–4)	**Quantrill** (1)	13–12	W2
26	August 19	Rangers	6–3 (10)	**Hill** (1–0)	Montero (0–1)	—	14–12	W3
27	August 20	Rangers	8–7 (10)	**Johnson** (2–1)	García (0–1)	—	15–12	W4
28	August 21	Astros	4–3	**Guerra** (1–0)	McCullers Jr. (2–2)	**Pagán** (1)	16–12	W5
29	August 22	Astros	13–2	**Davies** (4–2)	Bielak (3–1)	—	17–12	W6
30	August 23	Astros	5–3	**Stammen** (3–1)	Paredes (0–1)	**Pagán** (2)	18–12	W7
31	August 25	Mariners	3–8	Gonzales (3–2)	**Paddack** (2–3)	—	18–13	L1
—	August 26	Mariners	Postponed (Boycotts due to Jacob Blake shooting); Makeup: August 27					
32	August 27	Mariners (1)	10–7 (7)	**Johnson** (3–1)	Williams (0–1)	—	19–13	W1
33	August 27	Mariners (2)	3–8 (7)	Kikuchi (1–2)	**Richards** (1–2)	—	19–14	L1
34	August 28	@ Rockies	10–4	**Davies** (5–2)	Hoffman (2–1)	—	20–14	W1
35	August 29	@ Rockies	3–4	Bard (2–2)	**Stammen** (3–2)	—	20–15	L1
36	August 30	@ Rockies	13–2	**Paddack** (3–3)	Castellani (1–2)	—	21–15	W1
37	August 31	@ Rockies	6–0	**Morejón** (1–0)	Márquez (2–5)	—	22–15	W2

September: 15–8 (Home: 8–4; Away: 7–4)

#	Date	Opponent	Score	Win	Loss	Save	Record	Streak
38	September 2	@ Angels	11–4	**Hill** (2–0)	Buttrey (1–2)	—	23–15	W3
39	September 3	@ Angels	0–2	Heaney (3–2)	**Clevinger** (1–2)	Peña (1)	23–16	L1
40	September 4	@ Athletics	7–0	**Davies** (6–2)	Luzardo (2–2)	—	24–16	W1
41	September 5	@ Athletics	4–8	Manaea (3–2)	**Paddack** (3–4)	—	24–17	L1
42	September 6	@ Athletics	5–3	**Richards** (2–2)	Fiers (4–2)	**Rosenthal** (8)	25–17	W1
43	September 7	Rockies	1–0	**Pomeranz** (1–0)	Estévez (1–2)	—	26–17	W2
44	September 8	Rockies	14–5	**Clevinger** (2–2)	Gonzalez (0–1)	—	27–17	W3
45	September 9	Rockies	5–3	**Davies** (7–2)	Senzatela (3–2)	**Rosenthal** (9)	28–17	W4
46	September 10	Giants	6–1	**Morejón** (2–0)	Cahill (0–1)	—	29–17	W5
–	September 11	Giants	Postponed (COVID-19); Makeup September 13					
–	September 12	Giants	Postponed (COVID-19); Makeup September 25					
47	September 13 (1)	Giants	6–0 (7)	**Clevinger** (3–2)	Cueto (2–1)	—	30–17	W6
48	September 13 (2)	Giants	3–1 (7)	**Hill** (3–0)	Selman (1–1)	**Rosenthal** (10)	31–17	W7
49	September 14	Dodgers	7–2	**Lamet** (3–1)	Kershaw (5–2)	—	32–17	W8
50	September 15	Dodgers	1–3	Gonsolin (1–1)	**Davies** (7–3)	Jansen (11)	32–18	L1
51	September 16	Dodgers	5–7	Kolarek (3–0)	**Morejón** (2–1)	Báez (2)	32–19	L2
52	September 18	@ Mariners	6–1	**Paddack** (4–4)	Kikuchi (2–4)	—	33–19	W1
53	September 19	@ Mariners	1–4	Sheffield (4–3)	**Altavilla** (1–3)	Hirano (3)	33–20	L1
54	September 20	@ Mariners	7–4 (11)	**Rosenthal** (1–0)	Sadler (1–1)	—	34–20	W1
55	September 22	Angels	2–4	Canning (4–2)	**Davies** (7–4)	Mayers (2)	34–21	L1
56	September 23	Angels	2–5	Sandoval (1–4)	**Morejón** (2–2)	Peña (2)	34–22	L2
57	September 25	@ Giants (1)	4–5 (7)	Anderson (4–3)	**Paddack** (4–5)	—	34–23	L3
58	September 25	Giants (2)	6–5 (7)	**Patiño** (1–0)	Coonrod (0–2)	—	35–23	W1
59	September 26	@ Giants	6–2	**Stammen** (4–2)	Cueto (2–3)	—	36–23	W2
60	September 27	@ Giants	5–4	**Altavilla** (2–3)	Smyly (0–1)	**Rosenthal** (11)	37–23	W3

Legend: = Win = Loss = Postponement
Bold = Padres team member

== Roster ==
2020 San Diego Padres
Roster
Pitchers: 54 Austin Adams; 57 Dan Altavilla; 49 Michel Báez; 67 David Bednar; 52 Mike Clevinger; 17 Zach Davies; 8 Javy Guerra; 25 Tim Hill; 36 Pierce Johnson; 29 Dinelson Lamet; 37 Joey Lucchesi; 50 Adrián Morejón; 59 Chris Paddack; 14 Emilio Pagán; 62 Luis Patino; 61 Luis Perdomo; 15 Drew Pomeranz; 40 Cal Quantrill; 43 Garrett Richards; 47 Trevor Rosenthal; 34 Craig Stammen; 55 Matt Strahm; 40 Ryan Weathers; 45 Taylor Williams; 39 Kirby Yates	Catchers: 11 Jason Castro; 18 Austin Hedges; 27 Francisco Mejía; 22 Austin Nola; 21 Luis Torrens; Infielders: 9 Jake Cronenworth; 11 Ty France; 5 Greg Garcia; 30 Eric Hosmer; 13 Manny Machado; 18 Mitch Moreland; 23 Fernando Tatís Jr.	Outfielders: 24 Greg Allen; 16 Abraham Almonte; 2 Trent Grisham; 3 Jorge Mateo; 4 Wil Myers; 22 Josh Naylor; 24 Edward Olivares; 63 Jorge Oña; 28 Tommy Pham; 10 Jurickson Profar; Other batters: 21 Luis Campusano	Manager: 32 Jayce Tingler; Coaches: 20 Rod Barajas (catching/quality control); 81 Griffin Benedict (bullpen catcher/instructor); 12 Bobby Dickerson (bench); 46 Damion Easley (hitting); 84 Ryan Flaherty (advance scout/development); 53 Ben Fritz (bullpen); 26 Glenn Hoffman (third base); 41 Wayne Kirby (first base); 38 Larry Rothschild (pitching); 56 Skip Schumaker (associate manager); 83 Peter Summerville (bullpen catcher/coaching assistant); 82 Keith Werman (development coordinator)

== Player stats ==
=== Batting ===
Note: G = Games played; AB = At bats; R = Runs; H = Hits; 2B = Doubles; 3B = Triples; HR = Home runs; RBI = Runs batted in; SB = Stolen bases; BB = Walks; AVG = Batting average; SLG = Slugging average

Player	G	AB	R	H	2B	3B	HR	RBI	SB	BB	AVG	SLG
Manny Machado	60	224	44	68	12	1	16	47	6	26	.304	.580
Fernando Tatís Jr.	59	224	50	62	11	2	17	45	11	27	.277	.571
Trent Grisham	59	215	42	54	8	3	10	26	10	31	.251	.456
Wil Myers	55	198	34	57	14	2	15	40	2	18	.288	.606
Jurickson Profar	56	180	28	50	6	0	7	25	7	15	.278	.428
Jake Cronenworth	54	172	26	49	15	3	4	20	3	18	.285	.477
Eric Hosmer	38	143	23	41	6	0	9	36	4	9	.287	.517
Tommy Pham	31	109	13	23	2	0	3	12	6	15	.211	.312
Mitch Moreland	20	69	8	14	5	0	2	8	0	4	.203	.362
Austin Nola	19	63	9	14	4	0	2	9	0	9	.222	.381
Greg Garcia	35	60	6	12	3	0	0	11	1	7	.200	.250
Austin Hedges	29	57	7	9	1	0	3	6	1	6	.158	.333
Ty France	20	55	9	17	4	0	2	10	0	5	.309	.491
Francisco Mejía	17	39	5	3	1	0	1	2	0	1	.077	.179
Josh Naylor	18	36	4	10	0	1	1	4	1	1	.278	.417
Edward Olivares	13	34	4	6	1	0	1	3	0	2	.176	.294
Jason Castro	9	28	3	5	5	0	0	3	0	2	.179	.357
Jorge Mateo	22	26	4	4	3	0	0	2	1	1	.154	.269
Jorge Oña	5	12	3	3	1	0	1	2	0	2	.250	.583
Abraham Almonte	7	11	0	1	0	0	0	0	1	2	.091	.091
Luis Torrens	7	11	0	3	1	0	0	0	0	1	.273	.364
Luis Campusano	1	3	2	1	0	0	1	1	0	0	.333	1.333
Greg Allen	1	1	1	0	0	0	0	0	1	2	.000	.000
Tim Hill	1	1	0	0	0	0	0	0	0	0	.000	.000
Austin Adams	1	1	0	0	0	0	0	0	0	0	.000	.000
Team totals	60	1972	325	506	103	12	95	312	55	204	.257	.466

=== Pitching ===
Note: W = Wins; L = Losses; ERA = Earned run average; G = Games pitched; GS = Games started; SV = Saves; IP = Innings pitched; H = Hits allowed; R = Runs allowed; ER = Earned runs allowed; BB = Walks allowed; SO = Strikeouts

Player	W	L	ERA	G	GS	SV	IP	H	R	ER	BB	SO
Zach Davies	7	4	2.73	12	12	0	69.1	55	26	21	19	63
Dinelson Lamet	3	1	2.09	12	12	0	69.0	39	18	16	20	93
Chris Paddack	4	5	4.73	12	12	0	59.0	60	33	31	12	58
Garrett Richards	2	2	4.03	14	10	0	51.1	47	23	23	17	46
Craig Stammen	4	2	5.63	24	0	0	24.0	27	16	15	4	20
Emilio Pagán	0	1	4.50	22	0	2	22.0	14	11	11	9	23
Matt Strahm	0	1	2.61	19	0	0	20.2	14	6	6	4	15
Pierce Johnson	3	1	2.70	24	0	0	20.0	15	7	6	9	27
Adrián Morejón	2	2	4.66	9	4	0	19.1	20	11	10	4	25
Mike Clevinger	2	1	2.84	4	4	0	19.0	14	6	6	3	19
Drew Pomeranz	1	0	1.45	20	0	4	18.2	9	3	3	10	29
Tim Hill	3	0	4.50	23	0	0	18.0	17	9	9	6	20
Luis Perdomo	0	0	5.71	10	1	0	17.1	13	12	11	10	16
Cal Quantrill	2	0	2.60	10	1	1	17.1	17	6	5	6	18
Luis Patiño	1	0	5.19	11	1	0	17.1	18	10	10	14	21
Javy Guerra	1	0	10.13	14	0	0	13.1	25	16	15	5	12
Trevor Rosenthal	1	0	0.00	9	0	4	10.0	3	1	0	1	17
Dan Altavilla	1	1	3.12	9	0	0	8.2	6	3	3	5	10
David Bednar	0	0	7.11	4	0	0	6.1	11	6	5	2	5
Joey Lucchesi	0	1	7.94	3	2	0	5.2	13	5	5	2	5
Michel Báez	0	0	7.71	3	1	0	4.2	7	4	4	2	7
Kirby Yates	0	1	12.46	6	0	2	4.1	7	6	6	4	8
Austin Adams	0	0	4.50	3	0	0	4.0	3	2	2	2	7
Taylor Williams	0	0	9.00	1	0	0	1.0	2	1	1	0	1
Team totals	37	23	3.86	60	60	13	520.1	456	241	223	170	565

== Postseason ==
=== Game log ===
2020 Postseason game log: 2–4 (Home: 2–2; Away: 0–2)
NL Wild Card Series: 2–1 (Home: 2–1; Away: 0–0)

#	Date	Opponent	Score	Win	Loss	Save	Record	Streak
1	September 30	Cardinals	4–7	Gallegos (1–0)	Paddack (0–1)	Reyes (1)	0–1	L1
2	October 1	Cardinals	11–9	Pagán (1–0)	Ponce de Leon (0–1)	Rosenthal (1)	1–1	W1
3	October 2	Cardinals	4–0	Adams (1–0)	Flaherty (0–1)	—	2–1	W2

NL Division Series: 0–3 (Home: 0–1; Away: 0–2)

#	Date	Opponent	Score	Win	Loss	Save	Record	Streak
1	October 6	@ Dodgers	1–5	May (1–0)	Richards (0–1)	—	0–1	L1
2	October 7	@ Dodgers	5–6	Kershaw (1–0)	Davies (0–1)	Kelly (1)	0–2	L2
3	October 8	Dodgers	3–12	Urías (1–0)	Morejón (0–1)	—	0–3	L3
all games played at Globe Life Field in Arlington, Texas * If necessary

NLWCS

=== Wild Card Series ===
==== Game 1 ====
The Padres started young right hander Chris Paddack against Cardinals lefty Kwang Hyun Kim. The Cardinals got to Paddack early, when Paul Goldschmidt hit a 2-run home run, Yadier Molina singled in Dylan Carlson and Matt Carpenter hit a sacrifice fly to make it 4-0 Cardinals. The Padres responded with an Eric Hosmer sacrifice fly in the 1st & an Austin Nola sacrifice fly in the 2nd. However, the Cardinals would get those runs back as Paul DeJong singled in Carlson & Carpenter singled in Molina to make it 6–2. Padres responded again with a Tommy Pham RBI single. In the 6th inning, Nola made it 6–4 with a sacrifice fly that ended in a double play as Jake Cronenworth was tagged out at 3rd. Dexter Fowler capped the scoring with an RBI single in the 9th to make it 7–4. Kim only lasted 3 2/3 and Paddack lasted 2 1/3.

==== Game 2 ====
The Padres gave the ball to veteran right handed Zach Davies, while the Cardinals gave the ball to veteran Adam Wainwright. The Cardinals got to Davies early with a Molina RBI single in the 1st inning. In the 2nd, Harrison Bader singled in Carpenter and Kolten Wong hit a 2-run home run. Davies would only go 2 innings, giving up 4 runs. Cardinals starter Adam Wainwright did not fare well either, as he loaded the bases in the 4th inning with nobody out, and Wil Myers would ground into a force play to get the Padres on the board. After a Nola walk, Wainwright was pulled after 3 1/3. Austin Gomber relieved him and out of the jam, but not before allowing another run to cross the plate. In the 6th inning, the Cardinals struck with a Fowler RBI double and a Wong sacrifice fly. The Padres would tie the game in the bottom half of the 6th inning on back 2 back home runs from Fernando Tatís Jr. & Manny Machado. The Padres took their first lead of the series in the bottom of the 7th when Myers homered and Tatis hit his 2nd home run of the night. Back-to-back sacrifice flies got the Cardinals within a run but the Padres put away the game when Myers hit his 2nd home run of the night. Goldschmidt though, would add another home run before Padres closer Trevor Rosenthal shut the door and sent the series to a winner take all Game 3.

==== Game 3 ====
The Cardinals started ace Jack Flaherty, while the Padres went with a bullpen game. The game remained scoreless until the 5th inning, when Hosmer doubled in Tatis to get the Padres on the board first. The Padres added two more runs in the 7th inning on a fielders choice & a bases loaded walk. Cronenworth would cap off the scoring with a solo home run in the 8th inning. The Padres bullpen held the Cardinals to just 4 hits & Padres closer Trevor Rosenthal worked a 1-2-3 9th inning to send the Padres to the NLDS against the Los Angeles Dodgers.

NLDS

=== NLDS ===
The Padres faced their division rivals, the Los Angeles Dodgers in the NLDS.

==== Game 1 ====
Dodgers pitcher Walker Buehler started Game 1, while the Padres gave the ball to Mike Clevinger. Clevinger only pitched 1 inning before leaving the game with an injury. The Padres scored a run in the 4th inning on an Austin Nola RBI single. The Dodgers would respond in the 5th inning when Jake Cronenworth made a throwing error that scored Justin Turner. In the 6th inning, the Dodgers broke up a no-hitter with a double from Mookie Betts. Corey Seager hit a sacrifice fly that gave the Dodgers the lead, then Turner singled in Betts. Cody Bellinger then singled in Turner to make it 4–1. A wild pitch scored Max Muncy to make it 5-1 Dodgers. The Dodgers bullpen pitched 5 scoreless innings.

==== Game 2 ====
Dodgers lefty Clayton Kershaw started Game 2, while the Padres started right hander Zach Davies. Wil Myers got the scoring started with an RBI double. The Dodgers took the lead on a Corey Seager 2 run double and a Max Muncy RBI single. Cody Bellinger added a solo home run to make it 4–1. The Padres got back in it with back 2 back home runs from Manny Machado & Eric Hosmer. The Dodgers added two more runs on a sacrifice fly & a RBI single. Mitch Moreland brought in Jake Cronenworth in to make it 6-4 Dodgers and Trent Grisham made it a 1 run game and knocked Dodgers closer Kenley Jansen from the game. Dodgers reliever Joe Kelly then shut the door after that and put the Padres in an 0-2 NLDS hole

==== Game 3 ====
The Dodgers gave the ball to flame-throwing right hander Dustin May, while the Padres gave the ball to rookie left hander Adrián Morejón. The Dodgers started the scoring with a fielder's choice RBI from Cody Bellinger in the top of the 2nd. The Padres took the lead in the bottom of the 2nd on a bases loaded walk & a Grisham RBI single. The Dodgers broke it open in the top of the 3rd when shortstop Corey Seager drove in right fielder Mookie Betts, third baseman Justin Turner drove in Seager, left fielder A. J. Pollock singled in Turner & designated hitter Joc Pederson singled in Pollock to make it 6–2. Dodgers catcher Will Smith singled in Betts to make 7–2 in the top of the 4th. Betts hit a sacrifice fly to score Pollock to make it 8–2. Dodgers lefty Julio Urías balked in Manny Machado to make 8-3 Dodgers. Smith drove in Betts & Turner to make it 10-3 & Bellinger tripled in Max Muncy & Smith in to make it 12–3. Dodgers pitching shut the Padres offense down from there as the Padres were swept.

=== Postseason rosters ===
Playoff rosters
National League Wild Card Series

- Pitchers: 14 Emilio Pagán 15 Drew Pomeranz 17 Zach Davies 25 Tim Hill 34 Craig Stammen 36 Pierce Johnson 43 Garrett Richards 47 Trevor Rosenthal 50 Adrián Morejón 54 Austin Adams 55 Matt Strahm 57 Dan Altavilla 59 Chris Paddack 62 Luis Patiño
- Catchers: 11 Jason Castro 21 Luis Campusano 22 Austin Nola
- Infielders: 3 Jorge Mateo 5 Greg Garcia 9 Jake Cronenworth 13 Manny Machado 23 Fernando Tatís Jr. 30 Eric Hosmer
- Outfielders: 2 Trent Grisham 4 Wil Myers 10 Jurickson Profar 28 Tommy Pham
- Designated hitters: 18 Mitch Moreland

National League Division Series

- Pitchers: 14 Emilio Pagán 15 Drew Pomeranz 17 Zach Davies 25 Tim Hill 34 Craig Stammen 36 Pierce Johnson 40 Ryan Weathers 43 Garrett Richards 47 Trevor Rosenthal 50 Adrián Morejón 54 Austin Adams 55 Matt Strahm 57 Dan Altavilla 59 Chris Paddack 62 Luis Patiño
- Catchers: 11 Jason Castro 21 Luis Campusano 22 Austin Nola
- Infielders: 9 Jake Cronenworth 13 Manny Machado 23 Fernando Tatís Jr. 30 Eric Hosmer
- Outfielders: 2 Trent Grisham 4 Wil Myers 10 Jurickson Profar 24 Greg Allen
- Designated hitters: 18 Mitch Moreland 28 Tommy Pham

== Farm system ==
Level	Team	League	Manager	W	L	Position
AAA	El Paso Chihuahuas	Pacific Coast League				
AA	Amarillo Sod Poodles	Texas League				
High A	Lake Elsinore Storm	California League				
A	Fort Wayne TinCaps	Midwest League				
A-Short Season	Tri-City Dust Devils	Northwest League				
Rookie	AZL Padres 1	Arizona League				
Rookie	AZL Padres 2	Arizona League				
Rookie	DSL Padres	Dominican Summer League				
