= 1996 in baseball =

The following are the baseball events of the year 1996 throughout the world.

== Champions ==
=== Major League Baseball ===
- World Series: New York Yankees over Atlanta Braves (4-2); John Wetteland, MVP

Division Series (ALDS, NLDS)
East	NY Yankees	3
West	Texas	1
American League
WC	Baltimore	3
Central	Cleveland	1
East	Atlanta	3
WC	Los Angeles	0
National League
West	San Diego	0
Central	St. Louis	3

League Championship Series (ALCS, NLCS)
East	NY Yankees	4
WC	Baltimore	1
East	Atlanta	4
Central	St. Louis	3

World Series
AL	NY Yankees	4
NL	Atlanta	2

- American League Championship Series MVP: Bernie Williams
  - American League Division Series
- National League Championship Series MVP: Javy Lopez
  - National League Division Series
- All-Star Game, July 9 at Veterans Stadium: National League, 6-0; Mike Piazza, MVP

=== Other champions ===
- Caribbean World Series: Tomateros de Culiacán (Mexico)
- College World Series: LSU
- Cuban National Series: Industriales over Villa Clara
- Japan Series: Orix BlueWave over Yomiuri Giants (4-1)
- Big League World Series: Kaohsiung, Taiwan
- Junior League World Series: Spring, Texas
- Little League World Series: Fu-Hsing, Kaohsiung, Taiwan
- Senior League World Series: Maracaibo, Venezuela
- Korean Series: Haitai Tigers over Hyundai Unicorns
- Summer Olympic Games at Atlanta: Cuba (Gold), Japan (Silver), United States (Bronze)
- Taiwan Series: Uni-President Lions over Wei Chuan Dragons

== Awards and honors ==
- Baseball Hall of Fame
  - Jim Bunning
  - Bill Foster
  - Ned Hanlon
  - Earl Weaver
- Most Valuable Player
  - Juan González, Texas Rangers, RF (AL)
  - Ken Caminiti, San Diego Padres, 3B (NL)
- Cy Young Award
  - Pat Hentgen, Toronto Blue Jays (AL)
  - John Smoltz, Atlanta Braves (NL)
- Rookie of the Year
  - Derek Jeter, New York Yankees, SS (AL)
  - Todd Hollandsworth, Los Angeles Dodgers, OF (NL)
- Manager of the Year Award
  - Johnny Oates, Texas Rangers and Joe Torre, New York Yankees (AL)
  - Bruce Bochy, San Diego Padres (NL)
- Woman Executive of the Year (major or minor league): Audrey Zielinski, Detroit Tigers, American League
- Gold Glove Award
  - J. T. Snow (1B) (AL)
  - Roberto Alomar (2B) (AL)
  - Robin Ventura (3B) (AL)
  - Omar Vizquel (SS) (AL)
  - Jay Buhner (OF) (AL)
  - Ken Griffey Jr. (OF) (AL)
  - Kenny Lofton (OF) (AL)
  - Iván Rodríguez (C) (AL)
  - Mike Mussina (P) (AL)
  - Mark Grace (1B) (NL)
  - Craig Biggio (2B) (NL)
  - Ken Caminiti (3B) (NL)
  - Barry Larkin (SS) (NL)
  - Barry Bonds (OF) (NL)
  - Steve Finley (OF) (NL)
  - Marquis Grissom (OF) (NL)
  - Charles Johnson (C) (NL)
  - Greg Maddux (P) (NL)

== MLB statistical leaders ==
	American League		National League
Type	Name	Stat	Name	Stat
AVG	Alex Rodriguez SEA	.358	Tony Gwynn SD	.353
HR	Mark McGwire OAK	52	Andrés Galarraga COL	47
RBI	Albert Belle CLE	148	Andrés Galarraga COL	150
Wins	Andy Pettitte NYY	21	John Smoltz ATL	24
ERA	Juan Guzmán TOR	2.93	Kevin Brown FLA	1.89
Ks	Roger Clemens BOS	257	John Smoltz ATL	276

== Major League Baseball final standings ==
American League
Rank	Club	Wins	Losses	Win %	GB
East Division
1st	New York Yankees	92	70	.568	--
2nd	Baltimore Orioles *	88	74	.543	4.0
3rd	Boston Red Sox	85	77	.525	7.0
4th	Toronto Blue Jays	74	88	.457	18.0
5th	Detroit Tigers	53	109	.327	39.0
Central Division
1st	Cleveland Indians	99	62	.615	--
2nd	Chicago White Sox	85	77	.525	14.5
3rd	Milwaukee Brewers	80	82	.494	19.5
4th	Minnesota Twins	78	84	.481	21.5
5th	Kansas City Royals	75	86	.466	24.0
West Division
1st	Texas Rangers	90	72	.556	--
2nd	Seattle Mariners	85	76	.528	4.5
3rd	Oakland Athletics	78	84	.481	12.5
4th	California Angels	70	91	.435	19.5

National League
Rank	Club	Wins	Losses	Win %	GB
East Division
1st	Atlanta Braves	96	66	.593	--
2nd	Montreal Expos	88	74	.543	8.0
3rd	Florida Marlins	80	82	.494	16.0
4th	New York Mets	71	91	.438	25.0
5th	Philadelphia Phillies	67	95	.414	29.0
Central Division
1st	St. Louis Cardinals	88	74	.543	--
2nd	Houston Astros	82	80	.506	6.0
3rd	Cincinnati Reds	81	81	.500	7.0
4th	Chicago Cubs	76	86	.469	12.0
5th	Pittsburgh Pirates	73	89	.451	15.0
West Division
1st	San Diego Padres	91	71	.562	--
2nd	Los Angeles Dodgers *	90	72	.556	1.0
3rd	Colorado Rockies	83	79	.512	8.0
4th	San Francisco Giants	68	94	.420	23.0

- The asterisk denotes the club that won the wild card for its respective league.

== Events ==
=== January–April ===
- January 8 – For only the seventh time in history, and the first time since 1971, the Baseball Writers' Association of America fails to select a player for induction into the Baseball Hall of Fame.
- February 8 – Future Hall-of-Famer Dave Winfield announces his retirement. He is the oldest to hit for the cycle (in 1991) and is one of five players to reach at least 3,000 hits, 450 home runs and 200 stolen bases. Winfield was born on the day that Bobby Thomson hit the "Shot Heard 'Round the World" that led the New York Giants to the 1951 NL pennant.
- March 5 – The Veterans Committee elects four new members to the Hall of Fame, and just misses naming a fifth. The group elected includes Earl Weaver, Baltimore Orioles manager for 17 seasons; pitcher Jim Bunning, who wins 100 games in each league; 19th-century manager Ned Hanlon, who wins pennants in Baltimore and Brooklyn, and Bill Foster, the Negro leagues' winningest pitcher. Second baseman Nellie Fox receives the necessary 75% of the Committee's votes, but the rules allow for election of only one modern player, and Bunning has more votes.
- April 1:
  - Seven pitches into the first game of the season, at Cinergy Field in Cincinnati, home plate umpire John McSherry collapses on the field and dies of a massive heart attack. The game between the Cincinnati Reds and Montreal Expos is postponed, while most of the games scheduled for that day were played. Reds owner Marge Schott later comes under fire for wanting the game in Cincinnati to continue despite the events (and against the wishes of the players on both teams), saying that she feels "cheated" when it's canceled.
  - For the first time since the 1977 season, Alan Trammell takes the field in a Detroit Tigers uniform without Lou Whitaker on the roster. Whitaker and Trammell were teammates for 19 seasons, a record for a shortstop/second base combination.
- April 9 – In a wild Opening Day game at Tiger Stadium, the Detroit Tigers defeat the Seattle Mariners 10-9, scoring their 10 runs on just 4 hits. Alan Trammell hits a 3rd-inning home run, the final one of his career.
- April 11 – Atlanta Braves pitcher Greg Maddux ends his major league record for consecutive road victories with a 2–1 loss to the San Diego Padres. Maddux is 18-0 with an 0.99 earned run average in 20 regular-season road starts since losing to the Montreal Expos on June 27, 1994.
- April 16 – Cecil Fielder hits three home runs helping the Detroit Tigers beat the Toronto Blue Jays, 13–8.
- April 27 – Barry Bonds hits his 300th career home run helping the San Francisco Giants beat the Florida Marlins, 6-3.
- April 30 – At Cinergy Field, Jeff King of the Pittsburgh Pirates hits two home runs in the fourth inning of a 10-7 victory over the Cincinnati Reds. King, who had hit two home runs in the second inning of the Pirates' August 8, 1995 game against the San Francisco Giants, becomes the third player to hit two home runs in one inning on two occasions, joining Willie McCovey and Andre Dawson.

=== May–August ===
- May 1 - Dion James is released by the New York Yankees.
- May 7 – Mike Piazza hits his 100th career home run as the Los Angeles Dodgers lose to the Cincinnati Reds 3-2.
- May 11 – At Pro Player Stadium, Al Leiter of the Florida Marlins no-hits the Colorado Rockies 11-0, the first no-hitter in Marlins history.
- May 12 – Rafael Palmeiro hits his 200th career home run as the Baltimore Orioles lose to the Milwaukee Brewers 6-4.
- May 14 – New York Yankee pitcher Dwight Gooden pitches the first Yankee Stadium no-hitter in 3 years as his Yankees beat the Seattle Mariners 3-0.
- May 17 – At Oriole Park at Camden Yards, Chris Hoiles, batting with the bases loaded and his Baltimore Orioles trailing the Seattle Mariners 13-10, hits a grand slam home run off Norm Charlton for a 14-13 Oriole victory. Hoiles' home run, one of only 29 "ultimate grand slams" in Major League history, occurs on a full count with two outs. Hoiles becomes only the second player in Major League history to do so after Alan Trammell in 1988.
- May 21 – Ken Griffey Jr. hits his 200th career home run helping the Seattle Mariners beat the Boston Red Sox 13-7.
- May 24 – Ken Griffey Jr. hits 3 home runs helping the Seattle Mariners beat the New York Yankees 10-4.
- May 28 – Cal Ripken Jr. hits 3 home runs helping the Baltimore Orioles beat the Seattle Mariners 12-8.
  - In a game against the Chicago White Sox, Frank Viola of Toronto Blue Jays gives up four runs on five hits, two of them home runs, in 5.2 innings. Viola is relieved by Jeff Ware, and is tagged with the loss. This would be the last appearance in the majors for the former Cy Young winner, as he's released by Toronto weeks later.
- June 5 – Sammy Sosa hits 3 home runs helping the Chicago Cubs beat the Philadelphia Phillies 9-6.
- June 6 – The Boston Red Sox beat the Chicago White Sox 7-4, as John Valentin of Boston hits for the cycle and the White Sox complete a triple play. It marks the first time since July 1, 1931, that both events occur in the same game. The cycle makes Valentin, who turned an unassisted triple play in 1994, the first player to turn an unassisted triple play and hit for the cycle. Later, Troy Tulowitzki joins Valentin in accomplishing both feats.
- June 23 – The Los Angeles Dodgers defeat the Houston Astros at Dodger Stadium by a score of 4-3. It is the last game and victory in Tommy Lasorda's career. The next day he checks himself into a hospital with abdominal pains which he learns are the symptoms of a heart attack. He retires formally on July 29 with 1,599 wins.
- June 29 – Mike Piazza hits 3 home runs helping the Los Angeles Dodgers beat the Colorado Rockies 13-10.
- July 9 – At Veterans Stadium, the National League defeats the American League 6-0 in the All-Star Game. Ken Caminiti and Mike Piazza hit home runs for the winners. The game is the first All-Star contest in which no walks are issued by either team. The Orioles' Cal Ripken Jr. starts the game, despite suffering a broken nose when he accidentally catches a forearm from White Sox reliever Roberto Hernández when the latter slips on the tarp during the AL team photo shoot.
- July 12 – After the failure of two operations to repair the glaucoma-induced damage that blinded him in his right eye, the Minnesota Twins' much loved outfielder Kirby Puckett announces his retirement effective immediately.
- July 28 – Darryl Strawberry hits his 300th career home run, which helps the New York Yankees beat the Kansas City Royals 3-2.
- July 31 - The Detroit Tigers trade Cecil Fielder to the New York Yankees in exchange for Ruben Sierra and minor league pitcher Matt Drews.
- August 6 – Darryl Strawberry hits 3 home runs helping the New York Yankees beat the Chicago White Sox 9-2.
- August 16 – The first official Major League game to be played outside of Canada and the United States takes place at Estadio Monterrey in Monterrey, Mexico. The San Diego Padres win behind, appropriately, Mexican pitcher Fernando Valenzuela.

=== September ===
- September 2 – At the Kingdome, Mike Greenwell drives in all nine Boston Red Sox runs in his team's 9-8, 10-inning victory over the Seattle Mariners. The nine RBIs are the most by one player accounting for all of his team's runs in one game. Greenwell, whose evening includes two home runs, singles in the tenth to score Wil Cordero for the winning run.
- September 6:
  - Eddie Murray of the Baltimore Orioles becomes the 15th player in major league history to hit 500 home runs. He homers off Felipe Lira in the seventh inning of the Orioles' 5-4, 12-inning loss to the Detroit Tigers at Camden Yards. Murray also joins Hank Aaron and Willie Mays as the only big leaguers to reach both this milestone and also the 3,000 hit mark.
  - Brett Butler returns to the Los Angeles Dodgers line-up four months after having surgery for throat cancer. The 39-year-old center fielder scores the decisive run in a 3-2 victory over the Pittsburgh Pirates.
- September 14 – The New York Mets' Todd Hundley hit his 41st home run of the season in a 6-5 win at home against the Braves to set a Major League record for home runs in a season by a catcher.
- September 16 – Paul Molitor of the Minnesota Twins becomes the first DH with 3,000 career hits. He is the first player in history to reach the milestone by collecting a triple.
- September 17 – Hideo Nomo pitches a no-hitter against the Colorado Rockies, leading the Los Angeles Dodgers to a 9-0 victory. Nomo walks four batters and strikes out eight.
- September 18 – Roger Clemens of the Boston Red Sox ties his own Major League record for a nine inning game by striking out twenty Detroit Tigers en route to a 4-0 win.
- September 27 – Barry Bonds steals his 40th base of the season, becoming the second member of Major League Baseball's 40–40 club. Bonds' San Francisco Giants defeat the Colorado Rockies, 9-3.
- September 29 – Against the Toronto Blue Jays at the SkyDome, Brady Anderson of the Baltimore Orioles hits his 50th home run of the season. The home run, leading off the game, breaks Frank Robinson's single-season franchise record of 49 home runs in 1966. Anderson also becomes the first player to hit 50 home runs in one season and steal 50 bases in another, having stolen 52 in 1992. However, the Blue Jays give up no more runs and defeat the Orioles 4-1 for Pat Hentgen's 20th victory of the season. Hentgen, the eventual American League Cy Young Award winner, becomes only the second 20-game winner in Jays history, after Jack Morris won 21 games in the Blue Jays 1992 championship season.

=== October-December ===
- October 24 – In Game 5 of the 1996 World Series, the Atlanta Braves play their final game at Fulton County Stadium vs. the New York Yankees. Andy Pettitte outduels eventual NL Cy Young winner John Smoltz as the Yankees win Game 5 1-0 to take a 3-2 series lead.
- October 26 – The New York Yankees take their fourth victory in a row from the Atlanta Braves, 3-2, giving them the 1996 World Series and their 23rd World Championship. Starter Jimmy Key gets the win with help from closer John Wetteland, whose four saves earn him the World Series MVP trophy.
- November 5 - Spectacular New York Yankee newcomer Derek Jeter was named unanimously the American League Rookie of the Year.
- November 7 - 2 great managers share together being named American League Managers of the year. Joe Torre, who led the Yankees to a World Championship while Johnny Oates led the Texas Rangers to their first ever postseason appearance.
- November 8 - Bruce Bochy who led the San Diego Padres to their first post season appearance since the 1984 World Series was named National League Manager of the year, just edging out the Montreal Expos' Felipe Alou and the St. Louis Cardinals' Tony LaRussa for the honor.
- November 12 – Pat Hentgen of the Toronto Blue Jays edges Andy Pettitte of the New York Yankees for the Cy Young Award in the closest American League voting since 1972 when Gaylord Perry tops Wilbur Wood by six points. Hentgen, who posts a 20-10 record with a 3.22 ERA and leads the Major Leagues in complete games (10), outpoints Pettitte (21-8, 3.87) by the narrow margin of 110-104. Yankees reliever Mariano Rivera, who goes 8-3 with a 2.09 ERA and five saves in 61 appearances, finishes third in the ballot and receives one first-place vote.
- November 26 – Less than three weeks after major league owners vote 18-12 against ratification of baseball's new collective bargaining agreement, owners vote again and this time approve it by a vote of 26-4. The landmark agreement brings interleague play to the regular season for the first time as well as revenue sharing among owners and a payroll tax on players.
- November 30 – Ken Caminiti of the San Diego Padres is the unanimous choice as National League Most Valuable Player. In 2002, he would be the first player of his era to admit that he uses steroids, specifically during this season, and dies in 2004 at age 41 of a heart attack thought to be drug-related. Mike Piazza is the runner-up for the award.

== Movies ==
- Ed
- Fan, The
- Last Home Run, The
- Soul of the Game (TV)

== Births ==
=== January ===
- January 3 – Jakson Reetz
- January 4 – Blake Cederlind
- January 7 – Dean Kremer
- January 8 – Chris Paddack
- January 9 – Jacob Nix
- January 10 – José Castillo
- January 15 – Janson Junk
- January 15 – Taylor Rashi
- January 16 – Garrett Hill
- January 21 – Michel Báez
- January 24 – Connor Seabold
- January 28 – Jorge Guzmán
- January 30 – Nick Duron
- January 30 – Ariel Jurado
- January 31 – Rudy Martin Jr.

=== February ===
- February 2 – Troy Stokes Jr.
- February 3 – Nick Allgeyer
- February 5 – Austin Warren
- February 6 – Pavin Smith
- February 9 – Brewer Hicklen
- February 10 – Ukyo Shuto
- February 17 – Deivy Grullón
- February 19 – J. P. Sears
- February 20 – Clarke Schmidt
- February 23 – Thairo Estrada
- February 24 – Michael Stefanic
- February 25 – Aaron Fletcher
- February 26 – Michael Papierski
- February 26 – Richard Ureña
- February 27 – Franklin Barreto
- February 27 – Blair Calvo
- February 27 – Corey Julks
- February 29 – Bligh Madris

=== March ===
- March 5 – Lucas Gilbreath
- March 6 – Edward Olivares
- March 6 – Edmundo Sosa
- March 7 – Pablo López
- March 8 – Jake Mangum
- March 8 – Dane Myers
- March 11 – Glenn Otto
- March 15 – César Salazar
- March 17 – Stuart Fairchild
- March 18 – Darren McCaughan
- March 21 – J. P. Martínez
- March 22 – Ernie Clement
- March 22 – Tristan Gray
- March 22 – Grant Holmes
- March 25 – Tucker Davidson
- March 25 – Scott Hurst
- March 28 – David Hensley
- March 28 – Ryan Miller
- March 30 – Ryan Noda

=== April ===
- April 1 – Ryan Castellani
- April 1 – Kutter Crawford
- April 2 – Brandon Bielak
- April 4 – Mitch Keller
- April 7 – Hoy Park
- April 7 – Magneuris Sierra
- April 8 – Jake Latz
- April 10 – Scott Blewett
- April 10 – Jake Burger
- April 11 – Alex Vesia
- April 12 – Adam Haseley
- April 12 – Dennis Santana
- April 15 – Dauri Moreta
- April 15 – Reiver Sanmartín
- April 16 – Packy Naughton
- April 17 – Mauricio Llovera
- April 18 – Jhonny Pereda
- April 19 – Seth Romero
- April 21 – Cionel Pérez
- April 22 – Rylan Bannon
- April 22 – Bowden Francis
- April 23 – Zach Logue
- April 23 – Bryce Montes de Oca
- April 23 – Gavin Sheets
- April 26 – Evan White
- April 29 – Luis Contreras
- April 30 – Michael Kopech
- April 30 – Zac Lowther

=== May ===
- May 1 – Tommy Doyle
- May 1 – Andre Jackson
- May 2 – Luis Torrens
- May 5 – Alejo López
- May 11 – José Azócar
- May 11 – Griffin Canning
- May 11 – Jordan Yamamoto
- May 12 – Tyler Ivey
- May 13 – Eli Morgan
- May 13 – Justus Sheffield
- May 15 – Kody Clemens
- May 15 – Alex Verdugo
- May 16 – Sean Bouchard
- May 16 – Donny Sands
- May 18 – Josh Fleming
- May 19 – Erich Uelmen
- May 19 – Connor Wong
- May 20 – Seth Elledge
- May 23 – Michael Helman
- May 23 – Chandler Seagle
- May 27 – Isan Díaz
- May 28 – Nate Fisher
- May 29 – Bobby Bradley
- May 30 – Luis Escobar
- May 30 – Alan Trejo

=== June ===
- June 3 – Charles Leblanc
- June 3 – Jackson Tetreault
- June 4 – Freddy Peralta
- June 5 – Dedniel Nuñez
- June 5 – Joe Ryan
- June 6 – Héctor Pérez
- June 9 – Ramón Rosso
- June 11 – Garrett Whitlock
- June 12 – Thomas Szapucki
- June 13 – Drew Avans
- June 13 – Jordan Holloway
- June 13 – Tyler Holton
- June 13 – Daniel Tillo
- June 14 – Tom Cosgrove
- June 14 – Robert Garcia
- June 14 – José Marte
- June 18 – Nick Margevicius
- June 18 – Jake Meyers
- June 20 – Touki Toussaint
- June 24 – Tristan Beck
- June 26 – Riley Adams
- June 29 – Tanner Houck
- June 29 – José Mujica
- June 29 – Emmanuel Rivera
- June 30 – Kazuma Okamoto

=== July ===
- July 2 – Caleb Ferguson
- July 2 – Daulton Varsho
- July 3 – Codi Heuer
- July 3 – Cole Tucker
- July 4 – Kevin Smith
- July 4 – Ty Tice
- July 4 – Cody Wilson
- July 6 – Jonathan Hernández
- July 7 – Vinny Capra
- July 8 – Kyle Nelson
- July 10 – Sergio Alcántara
- July 10 – Taylor Walls
- July 15 – Kevin Padlo
- July 16 – Lane Ramsey
- July 17 – CJ Alexander
- July 18 – Jaime Barría
- July 18 – Sam Hentges
- July 19 – Jermaine Palacios
- July 24 – Cooper Criswell
- July 25 – Cam Alldred
- July 25 – PJ Poulin
- July 28 – Spencer Howard
- July 30 – Steele Walker
- July 31 – Luiz Gohara
- July 31 – Nick Plummer

=== August ===
- August 2 – Keston Hiura
- August 3 – Travis Blankenhorn
- August 3 – Alec Bohm
- August 4 – Brock Burke
- August 4 – Brady Singer
- August 6 – Manuel Rodríguez
- August 9 – Brendan Rodgers
- August 9 – Luke Williams
- August 11 – Brendon Little
- August 12 – Julio Urías
- August 15 – Marcus Wilson
- August 16 – Peter Solomon
- August 16 – Tyler Stephenson
- August 17 – Jefry Yan
- August 18 – Nolan Kingham
- August 20 – Nate Pearson
- August 23 – Ronald Bolaños
- August 26 – Luis Alexander Basabe
- August 26 – J. C. Mejía
- August 29 – Sung-mun Song
- August 29 – Justin Sterner
- August 30 – José Caballero

=== September ===
- September 2 – Ryan Feltner
- September 2 – Aaron Whitefield
- September 3 – Brian Van Belle
- September 3 – Jake Wong
- September 5 – Jarren Duran
- September 6 – Romy González
- September 6 – Jordan Hicks
- September 6 – Devin Sweet
- September 8 – Brandon Walter
- September 9 – JoJo Romero
- September 10 – Carlos Pérez
- September 10 – Blake Perkins
- September 12 – Kyle Bradish
- September 12 – Cal Stevenson
- September 13 – Jhonathan Díaz
- September 13 – Alfonso Rivas
- September 15 – Daysbel Hernández
- September 16 – Dylan Coleman
- September 16 – Matt Vierling
- September 17 – Kyle Dohy
- September 17 – Jeff Lindgren
- September 18 – Seth Beer
- September 18 – Beau Burrows
- September 18 – Marcos Diplán
- September 20 – Zach Pop
- September 23 – Easton Lucas
- September 26 – Matt Waldron
- September 28 – Alexis Díaz

=== October ===
- October 1 – David Bañuelos
- October 2 – Oliver Ortega
- October 4 – Édgar García
- October 4 – Jackson Kowar
- October 6 – Antonio Santos
- October 6 – Curtis Terry
- October 7 – Yusniel Díaz
- October 7 – Justin Hagenman
- October 7 – Nick Mears
- October 7 – Coco Montes
- October 8 – Tim Herrin
- October 8 – Chris Roller
- October 10 – Génesis Cabrera
- October 11 – J. B. Bukauskas
- October 11 – Josh Winder
- October 18 – Patrick Sandoval
- October 19 – Bryan Hoeing
- October 21 – Kolton Ingram
- October 22 – Demarcus Evans
- October 24 – Rafael Devers
- October 24 – Justin Maese
- October 24 – Chase Shugart
- October 28 – Willie MacIver
- October 28 – Jake Woodford

=== November ===
- November 1 – Trent Grisham
- November 2 – René Pinto
- November 2 – Denyi Reyes
- November 3 – Reiss Knehr
- November 4 – Cody Morris
- November 5 – Bryan King
- November 5 – Michael Plassmeyer
- November 6 – Gus Varland
- November 8 – Ljay Newsome
- November 11 – Nick Fortes
- November 12 – C. J. Stubbs
- November 15 – Yennsy Díaz
- November 15 – Owen Miller
- November 16 – Hiroshi Kaino
- November 17 – Daniel Lynch IV
- November 17 – Hunter Stratton
- November 18 – Logan Webb
- November 19 – Lewin Díaz
- November 20 – Connor Kaiser
- November 20 – Nick Neidert
- November 20 – Tarik Skubal
- November 26 – Cal Raleigh
- November 27 – Kody Funderburk
- November 27 – Eloy Jiménez

=== December ===
- December 1 – Jonathan Bowlan
- December 1 – Dylan Coleman
- December 4 – Daniel Duarte
- December 4 – Ford Proctor
- December 6 – Justin Dean
- December 9 – Cam Sanders
- December 10 – Enmanuel De Jesus
- December 10 – Adrián Martínez
- December 10 – Ryan Weiss
- December 11 – James McArthur
- December 12 – Cristopher Sánchez
- December 12 – Grant Wolfram
- December 13 – Luis García
- December 13 – Gleyber Torres
- December 15 – Joey Bart
- December 15 – Jonathan India
- December 16 – Bryan De La Cruz
- December 17 – Darwinzon Hernández
- December 18 – Michael Grove
- December 18 – Adonis Medina
- December 19 – Evan Kravetz
- December 20 – Abraham Toro
- December 21 – Aneurys Zabala
- December 22 – Nate Eaton
- December 24 – Nicholas Padilla
- December 26 – Hogan Harris
- December 27 – Kyle Tyler
- December 31 – Jorge Oña

== Deaths ==
=== January ===
- January 3 – Connie Ryan, 75, second baseman for five clubs in span of 12 seasons between 1942 and 1954; 1944 All-Star; spent much of his baseball career with the Braves franchise, as a player in Boston (member of 1948 National League champions), coach in Milwaukee (for 1957 World Series champs), and manager in Atlanta (latter weeks of 1975); also served the Texas Rangers as a coach (1977–1979) and acting manager (1977).
- January 5 – Elmer Singleton, 77, relief pitcher for the Boston Braves, Chicago Cubs, Pittsburgh Pirates and Washington Senators in all or part of eight MLB seasons spanning 1945–1959; pitched professionally for 23 years.
- January 8 – Dutch McCall, 75, pitcher for the 1948 Chicago Cubs.
- January 9 – Roger Freed, 49, outfielder who played from 1970 through 1979 with the Baltimore Orioles, Philadelphia Phillies, Cincinnati Reds, Montreal Expos and St. Louis Cardinals.
- January 9 – Overton Tremper, 89, outfielder for the Brooklyn Robins in the 1927 and 1928 seasons.
- January 10 – Joe Schultz, 77, backup catcher for the Pittsburgh Pirates and St. Louis Browns in eight seasons between 1939 and 1948; longtime MLB coach for Browns, St. Louis Cardinals, Kansas City Royals and Detroit Tigers; in 1969, manager for the American League expansion franchise Seattle Pilots in their inaugural and only season; as a coach, member of Cardinals' 1964 and 1967 World Series champions; son of "Germany" Schultz.
- January 21 – Dan Monzon, 49, middle infielder and third baseman for the Minnesota Twins during the 1972 and 1973 seasons; later a notable scout who covered Latin America.
- January 22 – Dick Rand, 64, backup catcher who played with the St. Louis Cardinals in the 1953 and 1955 seasons and for the Pittsburgh Pirates in 1957.
- January 25 – Mike Clark, 73, a highly touted pitching prospect in the St. Louis Cardinals minor league system in the 1940s, whose career was interrupted by three years of service during World War II; finally joined the Cardinals as a relief pitcher from 1952 to 1953, going undefeated in three decisions while recording one save in 35 relief appearances.
- January 25 – Chuck Coles, 64, left fielder who played with the Cincinnati Redlegs in 1958.

=== February ===
- February 6 – Bob Muncrief, 80, pitcher who won 80 games for five clubs between 1937 and 1951, most notably as St. Louis Brown; won 13 games in 1944, the Browns' only pennant-winning season; member of 1948 World Series champion Cleveland Indians.
- February 7 – Red Webb, 71, pitcher for the New York Giants in the 1948 and 1949 seasons.
- February 8 – Del Ennis, 70, three-time All-Star outfielder who finished in the top-20 in hits in the National League eight times with the Philadelphia Phillies from 1946 to 1956, as well in the top-10 in home runs, nine times; led the league with 126 RBI in 1956 while batting .311 and hitting 31 home runs; later played with the St. Louis Cardinals, Cincinnati Reds and Chicago White Sox through mid-1959.
- February 16 – Hank Gornicki, 86, pitcher who played for the St. Louis Cardinals, Chicago Cubs and Pittsburgh Pirates in a span of four seasons from 1941 to 1946.
- February 17 – Andy Lapihuska, 73, pitcher who played from 1942 to 1943 for the Philadelphia Phillies.
- February 19 – Charles O. Finley, 77, controversial and colorful owner of the Athletics between December 1960 and August 1980; moved franchise from Kansas City to Oakland after the 1967 season; functioning as his own general manager after 1966, he led the Athletics to three straight World Series titles from 1972 to 1974; brought innovations to MLB like night World Series games, the designated hitter rule, and brightly-colored uniforms and white spikes for his players.
- February 20 – Carolyn Morris, 70, All-Star female pitcher who hurled a perfect game and two no-hitters in the All-American Girls Professional Baseball League.
- February 23 – Gordon Goldsberry, 68, first baseman with the Chicago White Sox from 1949 through 1951 and St. Louis Browns in 1952; later became a scout and front-office executive.
- February 27 – Vic Janowicz, 66, backup catcher for the Pittsburgh Pirates from 1953 to 1954.
- February 28 – Augie Guglielmo, 81, umpire who worked one season, in a full slate of 154 games, in the National League in 1952.
- February 29 – Ralph Rowe, 71, MLB coach for the Minnesota Twins (1972–1975) and Baltimore Orioles (1981–1984); longtime minor league outfielder, manager and instructor.

=== March ===
- March 8 – Bill Nicholson, 81, five-time All-Star slugging right fielder for the Chicago Cubs and Philadelphia Phillies, who twice led the National League in home runs and RBI, finished 3rd in the MVP voting in 1943 and 2nd the next year, and collected 20 or more home runs seven times, including a career-high 30 homers in 1944.
- March 13 – Dick West, 80, backup catcher over all or parts of six seasons from 1938 to 1943 with the Cincinnati Reds.
- March 20 – Jim Pendleton, 72, Negro American League and Triple-A outfielder, who later enjoyed an eight-year National League career spanning 1953–1962 with the Milwaukee Braves, Pittsburgh Pirates, Cincinnati Reds and Houston Colt .45s; just the second rookie to hit three homers in a major league game
- March 21 – Ruby Stephens, 71, All-American Girls Professional Baseball League pitcher who posted a 61-53 record in six seasons and hurled a no-hitter in 1950.
- March 22 – Pete Whisenant, 66, outfielder and utility man who played for six teams in eight seasons spanning 1952–1961, primarily with the Cincinnati Reds/Redlegs.
- March 24 – Ray Pepper, 90, outfielder who played from 1932 through 1936 for the St. Louis Cardinals and St. Louis Browns.
- March 24 – Jerry Robertson, 52, pitcher who played with the Montreal Expos in 1969 and Detroit Tigers in 1970.
- March 28 – Don Ross, 81, versatile infield-outfield utility who played for the Detroit Tigers, Brooklyn Dodgers and Cleveland Indians during eight seasons spanning 1938–1946.

=== April ===
- April 1 – John McSherry, 51, National League umpire from 1971 until he suffered a fatal heart attack while working at home plate of the NL Opening Day game in Cincinnati; umpired in the World Series in 1977 and 1987, and also officiated in eight NL Championship Series, two NL Division Games, and three All-Star Games.
- April 14 – Clyde McNeal, 67, shortstop in the Negro leagues.
- April 17 – Bill Serena, 71, third baseman who played from 1949 through 1954 for the Chicago Cubs.
- April 20 – Hank Biasatti, 74, Italian–Canadian first baseman for the 1949 Philadelphia Athletics.
- April 21 – Walker Cress, 79, pitcher who played for the Cincinnati Reds in 1948 and 1949; longtime scout.
- April 22 – Bob Brady, 73, catcher who played in four total games for the 1946–1947 Boston Braves.
- April 24 – Gary Geiger, 59, outfielder for the Cleveland Indians, Boston Red Sox, Atlanta Braves and Houston Astros in twelve seasons between 1958 and 1970.
- April 25 – Tommy Irwin, 83, shortstop for the Cleveland Indians in 1938.
- April 26 – Milt Gaston, 100, pitcher for five American League clubs in eleven seasons from 1924 through 1934, who had 18 Hall of Fame teammates and managers, more than any player in Major League Baseball history; brother of Alex Gaston.
- April 28 – Johnny Bucha, 71, backup catcher for the St. Louis Cardinals and Detroit Tigers in part of three seasons spanning 1948–1953.
- April 28 – Al Hollingsworth, 88, left-handed pitcher with the Cincinnati Reds, Philadelphia Phillies, Brooklyn Dodgers, Washington Senators, St. Louis Browns and the Chicago White Sox between 1935 and 1946; a member of the Browns' AL championship team that faced the Cardinals in the All-St. Louis 1944 World Series; had long post-playing career as coach and scout.

=== May ===
- May 1 – Jim Gleeson, 84, outfielder for the Cleveland Indians, Chicago Cubs and Cincinnati Reds in five seasons between 1936 and 1942; later managed in the minor leagues, and coached and scouted for the Kansas City Athletics and New York Yankees.
- May 2 – Pinky Jorgensen, 81, outfielder for the 1937 Cincinnati Reds.
- May 3 – Alex Kellner, 71, left-handed pitcher who played for the Philadelphia/Kansas City Athletics, Cincinnati Redlegs and St. Louis Cardinals between 1948 and 1959; named to 1949 AL All-Star team; younger brother Walt was briefly a teammate with Philadelphia in 1952–1953.
- May 4 – Gus Keriazakos, 64, pitcher who played for the Chicago White Sox, Washington Senators and Kansas City Athletics in a span of three seasons from 1950 to 1955.
- May 10 – Joe Holden, 82, catcher who played from 1934 through 1936 for the Philadelphia Phillies.
- May 19 – Johnny Berardino, 79, middle infielder and third baseman for the St. Louis Browns, Cleveland Indians and Pittsburgh Pirates in eleven seasons spanning 1939–1952, who later became a prolific actor, being best known for his role of Dr. Steve Hardy on the soap opera General Hospital.
- May 26 – Don Bollweg, 75, first baseman and member of the 1953 World Series Champion New York Yankees, who also played with the St. Louis Cardinals and for the Philadelphia/Kansas City Athletics.
- May 26 – Mike Sharperson, 34, versatile infield/outfield utility man mostly used at third base and second, who was selected for the 1992 All-Star Game and won World Series rings with the Los Angeles Dodgers in 1988 and for the Atlanta Braves in 1995.

=== June ===
- June 2 – Gene Snyder, 65, left-handed pitcher in 11 games for the 1959 Los Angeles Dodgers.
- June 7 – Buddy Blair, 85, third baseman for the Philadelphia Athletics during the 1942 season.
- June 8 – C. Arnholt Smith, 97, California banker and the founding principal owner of the San Diego Padres of the National League from 1968 until he sold the team to Ray Kroc in 1974.
- June 13 – Al Piechota, 82, pitcher who played from 1940 to 1941 for the Boston Bees and Braves.
- June 16 – Mel Allen, 83, legendary broadcaster who spent over 35 years with the New York Yankees, still promoted as having been The Voice of the Yankees, while in his later years he gained a second professional life as the first host of the syndicated TV series This Week in Baseball.
- June 26 – Buck Frierson, 78, outfielder for the 1941 Cleveland Indians.
- June 30 – Jerry May, 52, catcher who played from 1964 through 1973 for the Pittsburgh Pirates, Kansas City Royals and New York Mets.

=== July ===
- July 8 – Jim Baumer, 65, second baseman who played briefly with the Chicago White Sox in 1949 and Cincinnati Reds in 1961; later a scout and front-office executive, serving as general manager of the Milwaukee Brewers from 1975 to 1977.
- July 8 – Jim Busby, 69, All-Star and speedy center fielder who played from 1950 through 1962 for the Chicago White Sox, Washington Senators, Cleveland Indians, Baltimore Orioles, Boston Red Sox and Houston Colt .45s; ranked among the top five in stolen bases four times and led the American League in putouts twice, while recording three of the top 20 single-season outfield putout totals in major league history; later a longtime coach for four MLB clubs, notably the Atlanta Braves.
- July 14 – Hank Camelli, 81, backup catcher for the Pittsburgh Pirates and Boston Braves in part of three seasons from 1943 to 1947; spent 16 seasons in the minor leagues as a player and playing/manager.
- July 19 – Dan Lewandowski, 68, pitcher who played for the 1951 St. Louis Cardinals.
- July 21 – Walt Moryn, 70, corner outfielder who played from 1954 through 1961 for the Brooklyn Dodgers, Chicago Cubs, St. Louis Cardinals and Pittsburgh Pirates; member of the 1955 World Series Champion Dodgers; 1958 NL All-Star.
- July 23 – Clara Cook, 75, All-American Girls Professional Baseball League pitcher, member of the 1944 Milwaukee Chicks champion team.
- July 23 – Red Munger, 77, three time All-Star pitcher who played for the St. Louis Cardinals and Pittsburgh Pirates during ten seasons spanning 1943–1956; helped the Cardinals clinch two National League pennants and the 1946 World Series.
- July 23 – Ed Wineapple, 90, pitcher for the 1929 Washington Senators.
- July 29 – Bill Jackowski, 81, National League umpire (1952–1968) who officiated in 2,519 NL games, plus three World Series and three All-Star contests.
- July 31 – Howie Goss, 61, center fielder who played in 222 total games with the Pittsburgh Pirates and Houston Colt .45s in 1962 and 1963.

=== August ===
- August 4 – Willard Brown, 81, Hall of Fame Negro leagues outfielder, one of the greatest power hitters of his generation, who later became the first African American ballplayer to hit a home run in the American League, while playing for the St. Louis Browns in 1947.
- August 13 – Ray Shore, 75, pitcher for the St. Louis Browns in a span of three seasons between 1946 and 1949, who later became one of the most respected scouts in baseball for the Cincinnati Reds and Philadelphia Phillies; combined duties of an advance scout analyzing upcoming opponents and as a special assignment scout who evaluated playing talent at the Major League level for potential acquisition in trades.
- August 24 – Ethel Boyce, 79, Canadian ballplayer who performed in the All-American Girls Professional Baseball League.
- August 28 – Al Zarilla, 77, All-Star right fielder who played for the St. Louis Browns, Boston Red Sox and Chicago White Sox in all or part of ten seasons from 1943 to 1953, being also a member of the Browns team that won the 1944 American League pennant.
- August 31 – Gil English, 87, third baseman who played for the New York Giants, Detroit Tigers, Boston Bees and Brooklyn Dodgers during six seasons spanning 1931–1944.

=== September ===
- September 2 – Wes Livengood, 88, pitcher for the 1939 Cincinnati Reds and longtime scout.
- September 4 – Babe Dahlgren, 84, All-Star and slick fielding first baseman who played for eight teams in a 12-year career from 1935 to 1946, best remembered for replacing Lou Gehrig in the New York Yankees lineup in 1939, ending his 14-year consecutive games streak at 2,130.
- September 6 – Barney McCosky, 79, outfielder who posted a .312 average for four teams in an 11-season career, leading the American League with 200 hits and 19 triples while helping the Detroit Tigers to the 1940 pennant.
- September 7 – Willy Miranda, 70, Cuban-born shortstop and slick fielder who played from 1951 through 1959 for the Washington Senators, Chicago White Sox, St. Louis Browns and Baltimore Orioles.
- September 9 – Harry Hanebrink, 68, backup second baseman and left fielder who played for the Milwaukee Braves and Philadelphia Phillies in four seasons spanning 1953–1959, also a member of the Braves team that lost the 1958 World Series to the New York Yankees in seven games.
- September 9 – Johnny Pramesa, 71, catcher who played from 1949 to 1952 for the Chicago Cubs and Cincinnati Reds.
- September 15 – Andy Pilney, 83, who made three appearances as a pinch hitter for the Boston Bees in 1936.
- September 17 – Billy Bowers, 74, outfielder for the 1949 Chicago White Sox.
- September 19 – Nanny Fernandez, 77, third baseman who played with the Boston Braves in 1942 and for the Pittsburgh Pirates from 1946 to 1947.
- September 22 – Joanne Winter, 71, All-American Girls Professional Baseball League All-Star pitcher and later a master teacher of golf for 30 years.
- September 24 – Red Embree, 79, pitcher for the Cleveland Indians, New York Yankees and St. Louis Browns in a span of eight seasons from 1941 to 1949.
- September 27 – Bruce Konopka, 77, first baseman who played for the Philadelphia Athletics over part of three seasons from 1942 to 1946.
- September 27 – Garland Lawing, 78, outfielder and pinch hitter who got into ten games for the Cincinnati Reds and New York Giants in 1946.

=== October ===
- October 2 – Tom Hafey, 83, third baseman who played with the New York Giants in the 1939 season and for the St. Louis Browns in 1944.
- October 2 – Les Tietje, 86, pitcher who played with the Chicago White Sox and St. Louis Browns in six seasons between 1933 and 1938.
- October 4 – Joe Hoerner, 59, All-Star left handed reliever who played for seven teams in a span of 14 seasons from 1963 to 1977, most prominently for the 1967 World Series Champion St. Louis Cardinals.
- October 5 – Joe Walsh, 79, backup infielder for the 1938 Boston Bees.
- October 15 – Mike Balas, 86, pitcher who played for the Boston Bees in the 1938 season.
- October 15 – Tom Ferrick, 81, relief pitcher who played for five clubs in a span of nine seasons from 1941 to 1952; member of the New York Yankees team that won the World Series championship in 1950; longtime pitching coach and scout.
- October 17 – Bob Adams, 95, pitcher for the 1925 Boston Red Sox.
- October 18 – Elmer Klumpp, 90, catcher who played with the Washington Senators in 1934 and for the Brooklyn Dodgers in 1937.
- October 23 – Bob Grim, 66, All-Star pitcher who played for five teams in eight seasons from 1954 to 1962, the last American League rookie to win 20 games, after going 20–6 with a 3.26 ERA for the New York Yankees en route to winning the 1954 AL Rookie of the Year Award; also a member of the 1956 World Series champion Yankees, as well as earning a save after retiring the final out of the 1957 MLB All-Star Game, with the American League leading 6–5, and getting pinch-hitter Gil Hodges on a game-ending fly out to left field.
- October 25 – Harry Shuman, 81, pitcher who played from 1942 through 1944 for the Pittsburgh Pirates and Philadelphia Phillies.
- October 28 – Joe Samuels, 91, pitcher for the 1930 Detroit Tigers.
- October 29 – Ewell Blackwell, 74, six-time All-Star with the Cincinnati Reds and the starting pitcher for the National League in the 1947 MLB All-Star Game; that season, he posted a 22–8 record with a National League-high 193 strikeouts and 2.47 ERA, won 16 consecutive games and threw a no-hitter against the Boston Braves on June 18 — coming within two outs of throwing consecutive no-hitters to match Johnny Vander Meer's 1938 feat of back-to-back no-no's.
- October 30 – Bob Thorpe, 69, right fielder who played with the Boston Braves in 1951 and for the Milwaukee Braves from 1952 to 1953.

=== November ===
- November 7 – Eddie Lukon, 76, outfielder who played for the Cincinnati Reds during four seasons between 1941 and 1947.
- November 11 – Luman Harris, 81, pitcher for the Philadelphia Athletics and Washington Senators in all or part of six seasons spanning 1941–1947; coached for the Chicago White Sox, Baltimore Orioles and Houston Colt .45s (1951–1964); interim manager of Orioles from September 1, 1961 to the end of season, then skipper of Colt .45s/Astros (September 19, 1964, through 1965) and Atlanta Braves (1968 through August 6, 1972); in 1969, led Braves to the postseason for the first time in club's Atlanta history.
- November 13 – Roger McCardell, 64. catcher for the 1959 San Francisco Giants.
- November 14 – Jim Baxes, 68, third baseman who spent the 1959 season with the Los Angeles Dodgers and the Cleveland Indians.
- November 16 – Joe Gonzales, 81, pitcher for the 1937 Boston Red Sox.
- November 16 – Charlie Neal, 65, three-time All-Star and Gold Glove Award winner at second base, who appeared in 970 career games with the Brooklyn/Los Angeles Dodgers, New York Mets and Cincinnati Reds from 1956 through 1963; hit .370 for the Dodgers in their 1959 World Series victory over the Chicago White Sox, and drove in the first Met run in their inaugural season of 1962.
- November 18 – John Michaels, 89, pitcher for the Boston Red Sox in the 1932 season.
- November 20 – Bill Sayles, 79, pitcher who played with the Boston Red Sox in the 1939 season, and for the New York Giants and Brooklyn Dodgers in 1943.
- November 21 – Earl Cook, 87, Canadian pitcher who played for the 1941 Detroit Tigers.
- November 24 – Loren Bain, 74, pitcher for the 1945 New York Giants.
- November 30 – Ted Petoskey, 85, three-sport All-American athlete and coach at the University of Michigan, who also played in the majors as an outfielder for the Cincinnati Reds from 1934 to 1935.

=== December ===
- December 2 – Bill Crowley, 77, broadcaster who was part of the New York Yankees' (1950–1951) and Boston Red Sox' (1957–1960) announcing teams, then worked as Bosox' public relations director from 1961 to 1981.
- December 3 – John Bateman, 56, catcher for the Houston Colt .45s/Astros, Montreal Expos and Philadelphia Phillies from 1963 to 1972; as a rookie in 1963, caught the first no-hitter in Houston franchise history, a 4–1 gem by Don Nottebart over the Phillies.
- December 5 – Cliff Mapes, 74, outfielder who played from 1948 through 1952 for the New York Yankees, St. Louis Browns and Detroit Tigers, while winning World Series rings with the Yankees in 1949 and 1950.
- December 9 – Dottie Schroeder, 68, amazing shortstop, and the only girl to play in the All-American Girls Professional Baseball League for its twelve full seasons.
- December 12 – George Jumonville, 79, shortstop for the Philadelphia Phillies from 1940 to 1941.
- December 22 – Fred Green, 63, southpaw pitcher who hurled in 88 games for the Pittsburgh Pirates and Washington Senators (1959–1962 and 1964); member of the 1960 Pirates World Series champions; father of Gary Green.
- December 27 – Gene Brabender, 55, pitcher who played from 1966 through 1970 for the Baltimore Orioles and Seattle Pilots/Milwaukee Brewers, winning a World Series with the 1966 Orioles; earned 13 victories for the 1969 Pilots in their inaugural and only season.
- December 31 – Sam Narron, 83, catcher for the St. Louis Cardinals over part of three seasons spanning 1935–1943, including the 1942 World Series champions; longtime coach (1951–1964) with Pittsburgh Pirates (including the 1960 World Series champs); uncle of Jerry and Johnny Narron, and grandfather of pitcher Sam Narron.
