= 2020 San Francisco Giants season =

Major League Baseball shortened 60-game season

2020 San Francisco Giants
- League: National League
- Division: West
- Ballpark: Oracle Park
- City: San Francisco, California
- Record: 29–31 (.483)
- Divisional place: 3rd
- Owners: Charles B. Johnson (Majority shareholder); Greg E. Johnson (Chairman)
- President: Larry Baer
- President of baseball operations: Farhan Zaidi
- Managers: Gabe Kapler
- Television: NBC Sports Bay Area (Duane Kuiper, Mike Krukow, Dave Flemming, Jon Miller, Shawn Estes, Javier López, Amy Gutierrez)
- Radio: KNBR (104.5 FM and 680 AM); San Francisco Giants Radio Network (Jon Miller, Dave Flemming, Duane Kuiper, Mike Krukow); KXZM (93.7 FM, Spanish) (Erwin Higueros, Tito Fuentes, Marvin Benard)
- Stats: ESPN.com; Baseball Reference

The 2020 Major League Baseball season was the San Francisco Giants' 138th year in MLB, their 63rd year in San Francisco since their move from New York following the 1957 season, and their 21st at Oracle Park. It was the first under the leadership of the team's new manager, Gabe Kapler, who replaced the recently retired Bruce Bochy, and new team general manager Scott Harris.

On March 12, 2020, MLB announced that because of the ongoing COVID-19 pandemic, the start of the regular season would be delayed by at least two weeks in addition to the remainder of spring training being cancelled. Four days later, it was announced that the start of the season would be pushed back indefinitely due to the recommendation made by the CDC to restrict events of more than 50 people for eight weeks. On June 23, commissioner Rob Manfred unilaterally implemented a 60-game season. Players reported to training camps on July 1 in order to resume spring training and prepare for a July 23 Opening Day.

== Season standings ==
=== National League West ===
NL West
Team	W	L	Pct.	GB	Home	Road
Los Angeles Dodgers	43	17	.717	—	21‍–‍9	22‍–‍8
San Diego Padres	37	23	.617	6	21‍–‍11	16‍–‍12
San Francisco Giants	29	31	.483	14	19‍–‍14	10‍–‍17
Colorado Rockies	26	34	.433	17	12‍–‍18	14‍–‍16
Arizona Diamondbacks	25	35	.417	18	16‍–‍14	9‍–‍21

=== National League Division Standings ===
Division leaders
Team	W	L	Pct.
Los Angeles Dodgers	43	17	.717
Atlanta Braves	35	25	.583
Chicago Cubs	34	26	.567

Division 2nd place
Team	W	L	Pct.
San Diego Padres	37	23	.617
St. Louis Cardinals	30	28	.517
Miami Marlins	31	29	.517

Wild Card teams (Top 2 teams qualify for postseason)
Team	W	L	Pct.	GB
Cincinnati Reds	31	29	.517	+2
Milwaukee Brewers	29	31	.483	—
San Francisco Giants	29	31	.483	—
Philadelphia Phillies	28	32	.467	1
Washington Nationals	26	34	.433	3
New York Mets	26	34	.433	3
Colorado Rockies	26	34	.433	3
Arizona Diamondbacks	25	35	.417	4
Pittsburgh Pirates	19	41	.317	10

The Brewers had the tiebreaker edge with their record against division opponents (19–21) better than the Giants' (18–22).

=== Record vs. opponents ===
2020 National League record Source: MLB Standings Grid – 2020
Team	AZ	COL	LAD	SD	SF	AL
Arizona	—	5–5	2–8	5–5	2–8	11–9
Colorado	5–5	—	3–7	3–7	6–4	9–11
Los Angeles	8–2	7–3	—	6–4	6–4	16–4
San Diego	5–5	7–3	4–6	—	8–2	13–7
San Francisco	8–2	4–6	4–6	2–8	—	11–9

== Game log ==
2020 Game Log: 29–31 (Home: 17–13; Away: 12–18)
July: 4–4 (Home: 2–2; Away: 2–2)

#	Date	Opponent	Score	Win	Loss	Save	Record
1	July 23	@ Dodgers	1–8	Kolarek (1–0)	**Rogers** (0–1)	—	0–1
2	July 24	@ Dodgers	1–9	Stripling (1–0)	**Anderson** (0–1)	—	0–2
3	July 25	@ Dodgers	5–4	**Baragar** (1–0)	Wood (0–1)	**Gott** (1)	1–2
4	July 26	@ Dodgers	3–1	**Peralta** (1–0)	Graterol (0–1)	**Gott** (2)	2–2
5	July 28	Padres	3–5	Davies (1–0)	**Samardzija** (0–1)	Pomeranz (1)	2–3
6	July 29	Padres	7–6	**Rogers** (1–1)	Strahm (0–1)	—	3–3
7	July 30	Padres	7–12 (10)	Johnson (1–0)	**Rogers** (1–2)	—	3–4
8	July 31	Rangers	9–2	**Menez** (1–0)	Minor (0–2)	—	4–4

August: 13–15 (Home: 7–6; Away: 6–9)

#	Date	Opponent	Score	Win	Loss	Save	Record
9	August 1	Rangers	7–3	**Baragar** (2–0)	Lyles (0–1)	—	5–4
10	August 2	Rangers	5–9	Hernández (2–0)	**Triggs** (0–1)	—	5–5
11	August 3	@ Rockies	6–7	Hoffman (1–0)	**Peralta** (1–1)	Díaz (2)	5–6
12	August 4	@ Rockies	2–5	Márquez (2–1)	**Gausman** (0–1)	Almonte (1)	5–7
13	August 5	@ Rockies	4–3	**Webb** (1–0)	Gray (0–1)	**Gott** (3)	6–7
14	August 6	@ Rockies	4–6	Almonte (1–0)	**Garcia** (0–1)	Díaz (3)	6–8
15	August 7	@ Dodgers	2–7	Floro (1–0)	**Samardzija** (0–2)	—	6–9
16	August 8	@ Dodgers	5–4	**Cueto** (1–0)	Kershaw (1–1)	**Gott** (4)	7–9
17	August 9	@ Dodgers	2–6	McGee (1–0)	**Rogers** (1–3)	—	7–10
18	August 10	@ Astros	4–6	McCullers Jr. (2–1)	**Webb** (1–1)	Pressly (1)	7–11
19	August 11	@ Astros	7–6 (10)	**Gott** (1–0)	Sneed (0–3)	**Rogers** (1)	8–11
20	August 12	@ Astros	1–5	Greinke (1–0)	**Baragar** (2–1)	—	8–12
21	August 14	Athletics	7–8 (10)	Soria (2–0)	**García** (0–1)	Hendriks (6)	8–13
22	August 15	Athletics	6–7	McFarland (2–0)	**Gott** (1–1)	Hendriks (7)	8–14
23	August 16	Athletics	3–15	Fiers (2–1)	**Webb** (1–2)	—	8–15
24	August 17	@ Angels	6–7	Buttrey (1–0)	**Gott** (1–2)	—	8–16
25	August 18	@ Angels	8–2	**García** (1–1)	Bundy (3–2)	—	9–16
26	August 19	Angels	7–2	**Cueto** (2–0)	Sandoval (0–3)	—	10–16
27	August 20	Angels	10–5	**Gausman** (1–1)	Suárez (0–1)	—	11–16
28	August 21	Diamondbacks	6–2	**Webb** (2–2)	Ray (1–3)	—	12–16
29	August 22	Diamondbacks	5–1	**Anderson** (1–1)	Grace (0–1)	—	13–16
30	August 23	Diamondbacks	6–1	**Baragar** (3–1)	Weaver (1–4)	—	14–16
31	August 25	Dodgers	10–8 (11)	**Selman** (1–0)	Santana (1–2)	—	15–16
—	August 26	Dodgers	Postponed (Boycotts due to Jacob Blake shooting); Makeup: August 27				
32	August 27	Dodgers (1)	0–7 (7)	Kershaw (4–1)	**Webb** (2–3)	—	15–17
33	August 27	Dodgers (2)	0–2 (7)	González (2–0)	**Gausman** (1–2)	Jansen (8)	15–18
34	August 28	@ Diamondbacks	4–7	Gallen (1–0)	**Anderson** (1–2)	—	15–19
35	August 29	@ Diamondbacks	5–2	**Garcia** (2–1)	Weaver (1–5)	**Rogers** (2)	16–19
36	August 30	@ Diamondbacks	4–1	**Watson** (1–0)	Crichton (2–2)	**Coonrod** (1)	17–19

September: 12–12 (Home: 8–5; Away: 4–7)

#	Date	Opponent	Score	Win	Loss	Save	Record
37	September 1	@ Rockies	23–5	**Gausman** (2–2)	Gray (2–4)	—	18–19
38	September 2	@ Rockies	6–9	Givens (1–1)	**Coonrod** (0–1)	Bard (4)	18–20
39	September 4	Diamondbacks	5–6	Bergen (1–0)	**Anderson** (1–3)	Ginkel (1)	18–21
40	September 5	Diamondbacks	4–3	**Baragar** (4–1)	Bumgarner (0–4)	**Watson** (1)	19–21
41	September 6	Diamondbacks	4–2	**Baragar** (5–1)	Young (1–3)	**Rogers** (3)	20–21
42	September 7	Diamondbacks	4–2	**Gausman** (3–2)	Gallen (1–1)	**Coonrod** (2)	21–21
43	September 8	Mariners	6–5	**Rogers** (2–3)	Misiewicz (0–2)	**Watson** (2)	22–21
44	September 9	Mariners	10–1	**Anderson** (2–3)	Margevicius (1–3)	—	23–21
45	September 10	@ Padres	1–6	Morejón (2–0)	**Cahill** (0–1)	—	23–22
—	September 11	@ Padres	Postponed (COVID-19); Makeup: September 13				
—	September 12	@ Padres	Postponed (COVID-19); Makeup: September 25				
46	September 13	@ Padres (1)	0–6 (7)	Clevinger (3–2)	**Cueto** (2–1)	—	23–23
47	September 13	@ Padres (2)	1–3 (7)	Hill (3–0)	**Selman** (1–1)	Rosenthal (10)	23–24
—	September 15	@ Mariners	Postponed (Bad Air Quality); Makeup: September 17				
48	September 16	@ Mariners	9–3	**Cahill** (1–1)	Newsome (0–1)	—	24–24
49	September 17	@ Mariners	6–4	**Garcia** (1–1)	Graveman (0–3)	**Selman** (1)	25–24
50	September 18	@ Athletics	0–6	Bassitt (5–2)	**Webb** (2–4)	—	25–25
51	September 19	@ Athletics	0–6	Luzardo (3–2)	**Gausman** (3–3)	—	25–26
52	September 20	@ Athletics	14–2	**Anderson** (3–3)	Minor (1–6)	—	26–26
53	September 21	Rockies	2–7	Márquez (3–6)	**Cueto** (2–2)	—	26–27
54	September 22	Rockies	5–2	**Rogers** (3–3)	Díaz (1–2)	**Coonrod** (3)	27–27
55	September 23	Rockies	7–2	**Webb** (3–4)	Castellani (1–4)	—	28–27
56	September 24	Rockies	4–5 (11)	Bard (4–2)	**Cahill** (1–2)	Díaz (4)	28–28
57	September 25	Padres (1)	5–4 (7)	**Anderson** (4–3)	Paddack (4–5)	—	29–28
58	September 25	@ Padres (2)	5–6 (7)	Patiño (1–0)	**Coonrod** (0–2)	—	29–29
59	September 26	Padres	2–6	Stammen (4–2)	**Cueto** (2–3)	—	29–30
60	September 27	Padres	4–5	Altavilla (2–3)	**Smyly** (0–1)	Rosenthal (11)	29–31

Legend: = Win = Loss = Postponement
Bold = Giants team member

== Roster ==
2020 San Francisco Giants
Roster
Pitchers: 64 Shaun Anderson; 31 Tyler Anderson; 73 Caleb Baragar; 53 Trevor Cahill; 65 Sam Coonrod; 47 Johnny Cueto; 76 Jarlin García; 39 Rico Garcia; 34 Kevin Gausman; 58 Trevor Gott; 52 Dany Jiménez; 51 Conner Menez; 60 Wandy Peralta; 57 Dereck Rodríguez; 71 Tyler Rogers; 29 Jeff Samardzija; 67 Sam Selman; 18 Drew Smyly; 59 Andrew Suárez; 66 Andrew Triggs; 56 Tony Watson; 62 Logan Webb	Catchers: 21 Joey Bart; 61 Rob Brantly; 43 Tyler Heineman; 14 Chadwick Tromp; Infielders: 9 Brandon Belt; 35 Brandon Crawford; 41 Wilmer Flores; 10 Evan Longoria; 2 Daniel Robertson; 48 Pablo Sandoval; 7 Donovan Solano	Outfielders: 61 Luis Alexander Basabe; 49 Jaylin Davis; 12 Alex Dickerson; 1 Mauricio Dubón; 6 Steven Duggar; 70 Joe McCarthy; 8 Hunter Pence; 37 Joey Rickard; 33 Darin Ruf; 13 Austin Slater; 5 Mike Yastrzemski; Other batters: 46 Justin Smoak	Manager: 19 Gabe Kapler; Coaches: 32 Craig Albernaz (bullpen); 84 Andrew Bailey (pitching); 45 Brian Bannister (pitching director); 50 Kai Correa (bench); 12 Donnie Ecker (hitting); 91 Mark Hallberg (special assistant); 21 Ethan Katz (assistant pitching); 88 Dustin Lind (director of hitting); 92 Alyssa Nakken (special assistant); 79 Nick Ortiz (quality control); 00 Antoan Richardson (first base); 17 Justin Viele (hitting); 23 Ron Wotus (third base); 99 Taira Uematsu (bullpen catcher)

== Player stats ==
=== Batting ===
Note: G = Games played; AB = At bats; R = Runs; H = Hits; 2B = Doubles; 3B = Triples; HR = Home runs; RBI = Runs batted in; SB = Stolen bases; BB = Walks; AVG = Batting average; SLG = Slugging average

Player	G	AB	R	H	2B	3B	HR	RBI	SB	BB	AVG	SLG
Wilmer Flores	55	198	30	53	11	1	12	32	1	13	.268	.515
Evan Longoria	53	193	26	49	10	1	7	28	0	11	.254	.425
Mike Yastrzemski	54	192	39	57	14	4	10	35	2	30	.297	.568
Donovan Solano	54	190	22	62	15	1	3	29	0	10	.326	.463
Brandon Crawford	54	172	26	44	12	0	8	28	1	15	.256	.465
Mauricio Dubón	54	157	21	43	4	1	4	19	2	15	.274	.389
Alex Dickerson	52	151	28	45	10	1	10	27	0	16	.298	.576
Brandon Belt	51	149	25	46	13	1	9	30	0	30	.309	.591
Joey Bart	33	103	15	24	5	2	0	7	0	3	.233	.320
Darin Ruf	40	87	11	24	6	0	5	18	1	13	.276	.517
Austin Slater	31	85	18	24	2	1	5	7	8	16	.282	.506
Pablo Sandoval	33	82	5	18	1	0	1	6	0	6	.220	.268
Chadwick Tromp	24	61	11	13	1	0	4	10	0	1	.213	.426
Hunter Pence	17	52	4	5	0	1	2	6	0	3	.096	.250
Tyler Heineman	15	42	3	8	1	0	0	1	1	4	.190	.214
Steven Duggar	21	34	3	6	2	0	0	3	1	1	.176	.235
Daniel Robertson	13	21	4	7	0	0	0	2	0	3	.333	.333
Luis Alexander Basabe	9	14	5	2	0	0	0	1	2	4	.143	.143
Jaylin Davis	4	12	2	2	0	0	1	1	0	0	.167	.417
Joe McCarthy	4	10	0	0	0	0	0	0	0	0	.000	.000
Justin Smoak	3	6	0	0	0	0	0	0	0	0	.000	.000
Joey Rickard	4	5	1	0	0	0	0	0	0	1	.000	.000
Rob Brantly	1	3	0	0	0	0	0	0	0	0	.000	.000
Team totals	60	2019	299	532	107	14	81	290	19	195	.263	.451

=== Pitching ===
Note: W = Wins; L = Losses; ERA = Earned run average; G = Games pitched; GS = Games started; SV = Saves; IP = Innings pitched; H = Hits allowed; R = Runs allowed; ER = Earned runs allowed; BB = Walks allowed; SO = Strikeouts

Player	W	L	ERA	G	GS	SV	IP	H	R	ER	BB	SO
Johnny Cueto	2	3	5.40	12	12	0	63.1	61	41	38	26	56
Kevin Gausman	3	3	3.62	12	10	0	59.2	50	26	24	16	79
Tyler Anderson	4	3	4.37	13	11	0	59.2	58	32	29	25	41
Logan Webb	3	4	5.47	13	11	0	54.1	61	38	33	24	46
Tyler Rogers	3	3	4.50	29	0	3	28.0	31	16	14	6	27
Wandy Peralta	1	1	3.29	25	0	0	27.1	22	13	10	11	25
Drew Smyly	0	1	3.42	7	5	0	26.1	20	11	10	9	42
Trevor Cahill	1	2	3.24	11	6	0	25.0	16	10	9	14	31
Caleb Baragar	5	1	4.03	24	1	0	22.1	17	10	10	5	19
Sam Selman	1	1	3.72	24	0	1	19.1	13	8	8	9	23
Jarlín García	2	1	0.49	19	0	0	18.1	11	6	1	7	14
Tony Watson	1	0	2.50	21	0	2	18.0	13	8	5	3	15
Jeff Samardzija	0	2	9.72	4	4	0	16.2	21	19	18	4	6
Shaun Anderson	0	0	3.52	18	0	0	15.1	10	6	6	12	18
Sam Coonrod	0	2	9.82	18	0	3	14.2	17	16	16	7	15
Trevor Gott	1	2	10.03	15	0	4	11.2	13	13	13	8	8
Conner Menez	1	0	2.38	7	0	0	11.1	6	4	3	5	8
Rico Garcia	1	1	5.40	12	0	0	10.0	13	6	6	4	7
Andrew Suárez	0	0	3.72	6	0	0	9.2	9	4	4	6	5
Dereck Rodríguez	0	0	13.50	2	0	0	4.0	10	6	6	3	2
Dany Jiménez	0	0	6.75	2	0	0	1.1	1	1	1	3	1
Tyler Heineman	0	0	0.00	1	0	0	1.0	1	0	0	0	0
Andrew Triggs	0	1	81.00	1	0	0	0.1	0	3	3	3	0
Team totals	29	31	4.64	60	60	13	517.2	474	297	267	210	488

== Farm system ==
Level	Team	League	Manager
AAA	Sacramento River Cats	Pacific Coast League	
AA	Richmond Flying Squirrels	Eastern League	
A-Advanced	San Jose Giants	California League	
A	Augusta GreenJackets	South Atlantic League	
A-Short Season	Salem-Keizer Volcanoes	Northwest League	
Rookie	AZL Giants	Arizona League	
Rookie	DSL Giants	Dominican Summer League	
