= 1996 Junior League World Series =

Tournament information
- Location: Taylor, Michigan
- Dates: August 12–17

Final positions
- Champions: Spring, Texas
- Runner-up: Aiea, Hawaii

The 1996 Junior League World Series took place from August 12–17 in Taylor, Michigan, United States. Spring, Texas defeated Aiea, Hawaii in the championship game.

== Teams ==
United States	International
Fort Wayne, Indiana; St. Joes; Central	Surrey, British Columbia; Whalley; Canada
Toms River, New Jersey; Toms River East American; East	Ramstein, Germany; Ramstein; Europe
Spring, Texas; Northwest 45; South	Monterrey, Nuevo León; Unidad Modtelo; Mexico
Aiea, Hawaii; Aiea; West	Yabucoa, Puerto Rico; Juan Antonio; Puerto Rico

== Results ==
Upper round 1	Upper round 2	Upper final	World Championship
—	Mexico	2
—	New Jersey	1
1–0	Mexico	3
1–0	Texas	10
—	Texas	13
—	Puerto Rico	2
2–0	Texas	4
2–0	Hawaii	1
—	Germany	0
—	Hawaii	14
1–0	Hawaii	9
1–0	Indiana	3
—	Indiana	4
—	Canada	3	3–0	Texas	7	–
3–1	Hawaii	5	–
Lower round 1	Lower round 2	Lower round 3	Lower final
1–1	Indiana	7
0–1	New Jersey	6	1–1	Puerto Rico	1	2–1	Hawaii	4
0–1	Puerto Rico	8	2–1	Indiana	4	3–1	Indiana	0
2–1	Mexico	3
1–1	Mexico	2
0–1	Germany	0	1–1	Canada	0
0–1	Canada	15

1996 Junior League World Series Champions
Northwest 45 LL
Spring, Texas
