= Antonio Santos (baseball) =

Dominican baseball player (born 1996)

Pericos de Puebla – No. 46
- Pitcher
- Born: October 6, 1996 (age 29); Villa González, Dominican Republic
- Bats: Right Throws: Right

MLB debut
- September 1, 2020, for the Colorado Rockies

MLB statistics (through 2021 season)
- Win–loss record: 0–2
- Earned run average: 8.83
- Strikeouts: 14
- Stats at Baseball Reference

Teams
- Colorado Rockies (2020–2021)

Antonio Nathanahel Santos (born October 6, 1996) is a Dominican professional baseball pitcher for the Pericos de Puebla of the Mexican League. He has previously played in Major League Baseball (MLB) for the Colorado Rockies.

== Career ==
=== Colorado Rockies ===
Santos signed with the Colorado Rockies as an international free agent on July 2, 2015. He spent the 2015 season with the Dominican Summer League Rockies, going 1–2 with a 0.75 ERA over 24 innings. He split the 2016 season between the DSL and the Boise Hawks, going a combined 6–4 with a 3.87 ERA over 81 /3 innings. He spent the 2017 season with the Asheville Tourists, going 9–10 with a 5.39 ERA over 147 innings. He split the 2018 season between Asheville and the Lancaster JetHawks, going a combined 5–13 with a 4.80 ERA over 152 innings. He split the 2019 season between Lancaster and the Hartford Yard Goats, going a combined 6–9 with a 4.53 ERA over 145 innings. Santos played in the Arizona Fall League for the Salt River Rafters following the 2019 season.

On November 20, 2019, the Rockies added Santos to their 40-man roster to protect him from the Rule 5 draft. On September 1, 2020, Santos was promoted to the major leagues for the first time and he made his debut that day against the San Francisco Giants. He made three appearances (one start) for Colorado during his rookie campaign, recording an 0–1 record 16.50 ERA with four strikeouts over six innings of work.

Santos made seven relief appearances for the Rockies during the 2021 season, compiling an 0–1 record and 4.76 ERA with 10 strikeouts across 11 1/3 innings pitched.

=== New York Mets ===
The New York Mets claimed Santos off waivers on November 24, 2021. On March 13, 2022, he was removed from the 40-man roster and sent outright to the Triple-A Syracuse Mets. In 29 games split between Syracuse and the Double–A Binghamton Rumble Ponies, Santos accumulated a 4–3 record and 5.74 ERA with 43 strikeouts in 42 1/3 innings pitched. He elected free agency following the season on November 10.

=== Ishikawa Million Stars ===
On May 12, 2023, Santos signed with the Ishikawa Million Stars of the Baseball Challenge League. On August 3, Ishikawa team announced that Santos left the team.

=== Pericos de Puebla ===
On December 11, 2023, Santos signed with the Pericos de Puebla of the Mexican League. In four starts for Puebla in 2024, Santos compiled a 2.49 ERA with 25 strikeouts across 21 2/3 innings pitched.

=== Chicago Cubs ===
On May 6, 2024, Santos' contract was purchased by the Chicago Cubs organization. He made 14 appearances (13 starts) for the Double-A Tennessee Smokies, registering a 9–4 record and 3.99 ERA with 80 strikeouts over 70 innings of work.

In 2025, Santos made 25 appearances (19 starts) for the Triple-A Iowa Cubs and Double-A Knoxville Smokies, accumulating a 3–9 record and 3.46 ERA with 86 strikeouts across 93 2/3 innings pitched. He elected free agency on November 6, 2025.

=== Pericos de Puebla (second stint) ===
On December 23, 2025, Santos signed with the Pericos de Puebla of the Mexican League.
