= José Mujica (baseball) =

Venezuelan baseball player (born 1996)

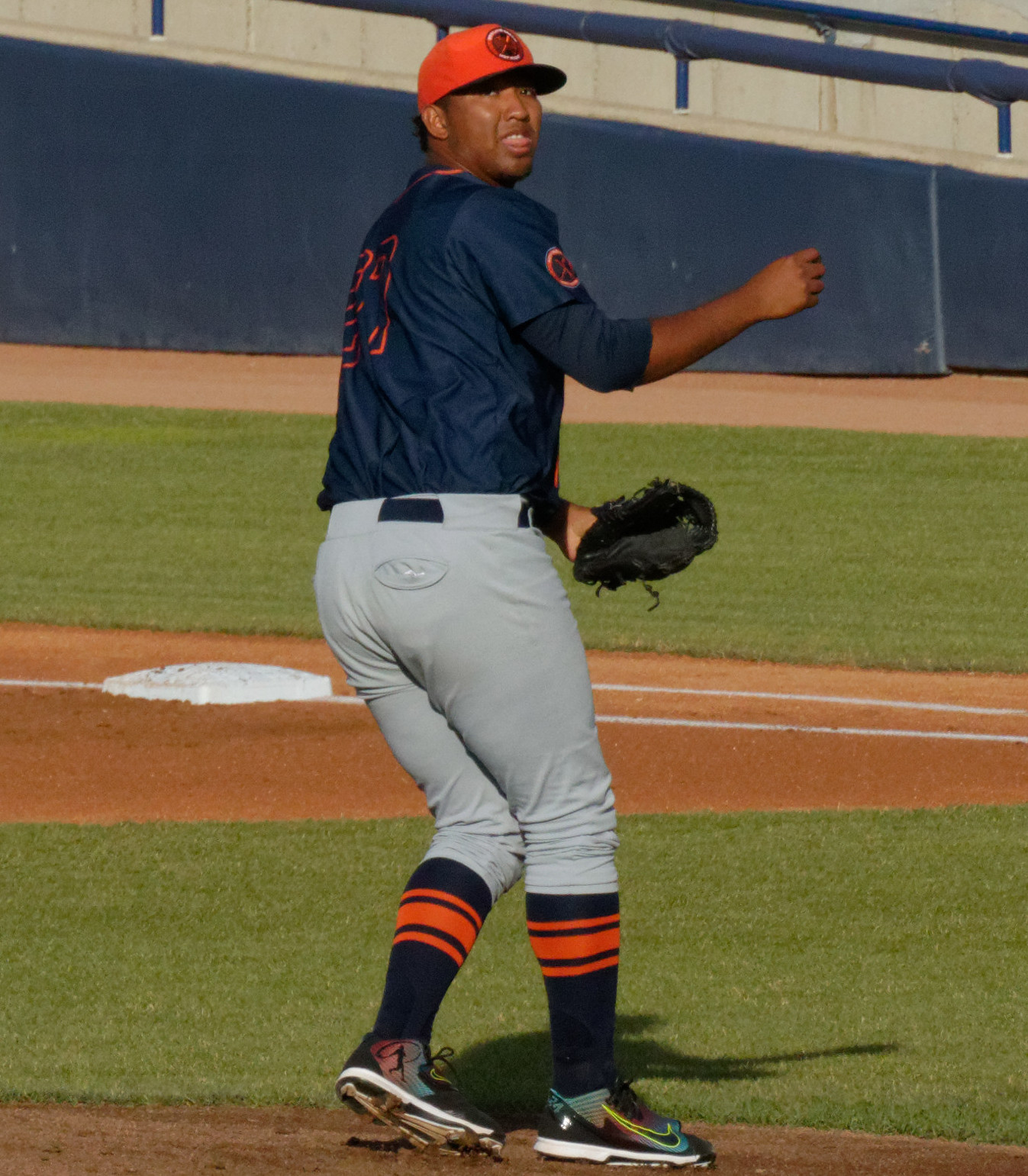
- Mujica with the Bowling Green Hot Rods in 2016

Free agent
- Pitcher
- Born: June 29, 1996 (age 30); Valencia, Venezuela
- Bats: Right Throws: Right

MLB debut
- September 8, 2020, for the Colorado Rockies

MLB statistics (through 2020 season)
- Win–loss record: 0–0
- Earned run average: 12.46
- Strikeouts: 1
- Stats at Baseball Reference

Teams
- Colorado Rockies (2020)

José Angel Mujica (born June 29, 1996) is a Venezuelan professional baseball pitcher who is a free agent. He has previously played in Major League Baseball (MLB) for the Colorado Rockies.

== Career ==
=== Tampa Bay Rays ===
Mujica signed with the Tampa Bay Rays as an international free agent on July 2, 2012. He spent the 2013 season with the Gulf Coast League Rays, going 3–2 with a 3.09 ERA over 32 innings. He appeared in only two games for the GCL Rays in 2014 due to a foot injury. He split the 2015 season between the Princeton Rays and the Bowling Green Hot Rods, going a combined 2–4 with a 3.18 ERA over 65 innings. He spent the 2016 season with Bowling Green, going 8–4 with a 3.46 ERA over 130 innings. He split the 2017 season between the Charlotte Stone Crabs, and the Montgomery Biscuits, going a combined 14–8 with a 3.04 ERA over 165 2/3 innings.

On November 20, 2017, the Rays added Mujica to their 40-man roster to protect him from the Rule 5 draft. Mujica split the 2018 season between the GCL, Charlotte, and the Durham Bulls, going a combined 6–2 with a 3.75 ERA over 57 2/3 innings. Mujica underwent Tommy John surgery in September 2018 and missed the 2019 season. Mujica was outrighted off the Rays roster on November 20, 2018. Mujica did not appear for the organization in 2019 and became a free agent following the season on November 4, 2019.

=== Colorado Rockies ===
On November 27, 2019, Mujica signed a major league contract with the Colorado Rockies. On September 4, 2020, Mujica was promoted to the major leagues for the first time. He made his debut on September 8 against the San Diego Padres, and gave up 7 runs, 6 earned, including a Wil Myers grand slam. Mujica made 2 appearances for the Rockies in 2020, recording a 12.46 ERA and 1 strikeout. Mujica was assigned to the Triple-A Albuquerque Isotopes to begin the 2021 season. On September 3, Mujica cleared waivers and was outrighted off of the Rockies 40-man roster. On October 13, Mujica elected free agency.

=== New York Yankees ===
On March 30, 2022, Mujica signed a minor league contract with the New York Yankees. In 41 appearances split between the Double–A Somerset Patriots and Triple–A Scranton/Wilkes-Barre RailRiders, he accumulated a 4.11 ERA with 58 strikeouts and 5 saves in 61 1/3 innings pitched. Mujica elected free agency following the season on November 10.

=== Washington Nationals ===
On December 18, 2022, Mujica signed a minor league deal with the Washington Nationals. He spent the majority of the year with the Triple–A Rochester Red Wings, also appearing for the Double–A Harrisburg Senators, High–A Wilmington Blue Rocks, and rookie–level Florida Complex League Nationals. In 20 appearances for Rochester, he registered a 5.92 ERA with 21 strikeouts in 24 1/3 innings pitched. On September 15, 2023, Mujica was released by the Nationals organization.

=== Toros de Tijuana ===
On February 6, 2024, Mujica signed with the Toros de Tijuana of the Mexican League. In 22 appearances for Tijuana, Mujica struggled to a 6.41 ERA with 21 strikeouts across 19 2/3 innings pitched.

=== Guerreros de Oaxaca ===
On June 12, 2024, Mujica was traded to the Guerreros de Oaxaca of the Mexican League. In 21 appearances for Oaxaca, he posted a 2-0 record and 1.37 ERA with 16 strikeouts across 19 2/3 innings pitched. Mujica was released by the Guerreros on April 14, 2025.
