= Yency Almonte =

American baseball player (born 1994)

- Almonte with the Colorado Rockies in 2018

Free agent
- Pitcher
- Born: June 4, 1994 (age 32); Miami, Florida, U.S.
- Bats: Switch Throws: Right

MLB debut
- June 21, 2018, for the Colorado Rockies

MLB statistics (through 2024 season)
- Win–loss record: 8–6
- Earned run average: 4.44
- Strikeouts: 215
- Stats at Baseball Reference

Teams
- Colorado Rockies (2018–2021); Los Angeles Dodgers (2022–2023); Chicago Cubs (2024)

Yency Almonte (born June 4, 1994) is an American professional baseball pitcher who is a free agent. He has previously played in Major League Baseball (MLB) for the Colorado Rockies and Chicago Cubs.

== Career ==
Almonte attended Christopher Columbus High School in Miami, Florida.

=== Los Angeles Angels ===
The Los Angeles Angels of Anaheim selected him in the 17th round of the 2012 Major League Baseball draft. He signed and made his professional debut that year with the Arizona League Angels where he pitched three innings. He pitched 2013 with the Orem Owlz where he was 3–3 with a 6.92 ERA in 13 games (11 starts) and 2014 with the Burlington Bees where he compiled a 2–5 record and 4.93 ERA in nine starts.

=== Chicago White Sox ===
On February 4, 2015, the Angels traded Almonte to the Chicago White Sox as the player to be named later from an earlier trade for Gordon Beckham. He pitched that season with the Kannapolis Intimidators and Winston-Salem Dash where he posted a combined 11–7 record and 3.41 ERA in 24 games (22 starts).

=== Colorado Rockies ===
On November 24, 2015, the White Sox traded Almonte to the Colorado Rockies for Tommy Kahnle. He spent the 2016 season with the Modesto Nuts and Hartford Yard Goats, compiling a combined 11–10 record and 3.58 ERA in 27 starts. The Rockies added him to their 40-man roster after the season. He spent 2017 with Hartford and the Albuquerque Isotopes where he was 8–4 with a 2.91 ERA in 22 games (21 starts). He began 2018 with the Isotopes.

On June 21, 2018, the Rockies promoted Almonte to the major leagues. He made his major league debut that same night, pitching one scoreless inning of relief against the New York Mets at Coors Field. Almonte finished the 2018 season with a 1.84 ERA in 14 2/3 innings of work. In 2019, Almonte pitched to a 5.86 ERA with 29 strikeouts in 34 innings pitched. Almonte kept the Rockies from having the worst bullpen in the league in 2020 after recording a 2.93 ERA in 24 appearances, 18 of which were scoreless. In 48 appearances for the Rockies in 2021, Almonte registered a 7.55 ERA with 47 strikeouts in 47 2/3 innings pitched. On October 21, 2021, he was outrighted off of the 40-man roster and elected free agency on November 7.

=== Los Angeles Dodgers ===
On March 13, 2022, Almonte signed a minor league contract with the Los Angeles Dodgers. He was added to the major league roster on May 12. In 33 games, he allowed only four runs in 35 1/3 innings. On January 13, 2023, Almonte agreed to a one-year, $1.5 million contract with the Dodgers, avoiding salary arbitration. He pitched in 49 games with a 3–2 record with a 5.06 ERA but missed the last month and a half of the season with a sprained medial collateral ligament in his right knee. On November 17, 2023, Almonte signed a $1.9 million contract with the Dodgers for the 2024 season, to avoid arbitration.

=== Chicago Cubs ===
On January 11, 2024, Almonte and Michael Busch were traded to the Chicago Cubs in exchange for Jackson Ferris and Zyhir Hope. He began the year out of Chicago's bullpen, compiling a 3.45 ERA with 20 strikeouts across 17 games. Almonte was placed on the injured list with a right shoulder strain on May 8, and was transferred to the 60–day injured list on June 27. On July 5, it was announced that Almonte would undergo season–ending shoulder surgery. On November 4, Almonte was removed from the 40–man roster and sent outright to the Triple–A Iowa Cubs, but he rejected the assignment and elected free agency.

On March 4, 2025, Almonte re-signed with the Cubs organization on a minor league contract. He made 15 appearances split between the High-A South Bend Cubs and Double-A Knoxville Smokies, accumulating a 2-0 record and 1.86 ERA with 17 strikeouts across 19 1/3 innings pitched. Almonte elected free agency following the season on November 6.

=== Los Angeles Dodgers (second stint) ===
On February 19, 2026, Almonte returned to the Los Angeles Dodgers organization on a minor league contract. On May 18, he was placed on the full-season injured list ruling him out for the season without appearing in a game. He elected free agency on November 2.
