= Jorge Oña =

Cuban baseball player (born 1996)

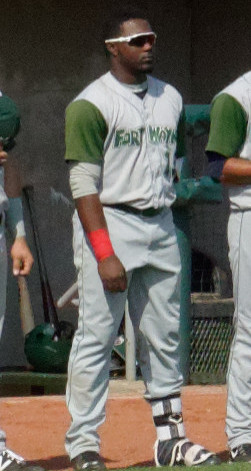
- Oña with the Fort Wayne TinCaps in 2017
- Outfielder
- Born: December 31, 1996 (age 28); Havana, Cuba
- Batted: Right Threw: Right

MLB debut
- September 7, 2020, for the San Diego Padres

Last MLB appearance
- September 16, 2020, for the San Diego Padres

MLB statistics
- Batting average: .250
- Home runs: 1
- Runs batted in: 2

Teams
- San Diego Padres (2020)

Jorge Luis Oña Ugarte (born December 31, 1996) is a Cuban former professional baseball outfielder. He has previously played in Major League Baseball (MLB) for the San Diego Padres.

== Career ==
At the COPABE 18U Pan American Championships 2014, Oña hit .636 with four home runs. In July 2015 he defected from Cuba to pursue a Major League Baseball career in the United States.

Oña signed with the San Diego Padres on July 21, 2016. He began his professional career in 2017 with the Fort Wayne TinCaps of the Single–A Midwest League and spent the whole season there, posting a .277 batting average with 11 home runs and 64 RBIs in 107 games. In 2018, he played for the Lake Elsinore Storm where he batted .239 with eight home runs and 44 RBIs in 100 games. He played in only 25 games in 2019 for the Amarillo Sod Poodles, hitting .348/.417/.539/.956 with 5 home runs and 18 RBI, due to suffering a labrum tear in his right shoulder which required surgery.

On November 20, 2019, the Padres added Oña to their 40-man roster to protect him from the Rule 5 draft. He was not immediately assigned to an affiliate in 2020 after the minor league season was cancelled as a result of the COVID-19 pandemic.

On September 7, 2020, Oña was promoted to the major leagues and made his debut that day against the Colorado Rockies. In his rookie year, Oña went 3-for-12 with one home run. On May 4, 2021, Oña underwent arthroscopic surgery on his right elbow, putting him out of action for six to eight weeks. On May 9, Oña was placed on the 60-day injured list. Oña did not appear in a major league game in 2021, appearing in just 5 minor league rehab games. He was outrighted off of the 40-man roster following the season on November 19, 2021.

Oña spent the 2022 season with the Double–A San Antonio Missions, playing in 69 games and batting .220/.301/.352 with 8 home runs and 25 RBI. He played in 35 games for San Antonio in 2023, hitting .218/.301/.391 with 3 home runs and 12 RBI. Following the season on December 18, 2023, Oña was released by the Padres organization.
