= Jairo Díaz =

Venezuelan baseball player (born 1991)

- Pitcher
- Born: May 27, 1991 (age 35); Puerto la Cruz, Anzoátegui, Venezuela
- Batted: Right Threw: Right

MLB debut
- September 8, 2014, for the Los Angeles Angels of Anaheim

Last MLB appearance
- September 26, 2020, for the Colorado Rockies

MLB statistics
- Win–loss record: 7–7
- Earned run average: 4.86
- Strikeouts: 108
- Stats at Baseball Reference

Teams
- Los Angeles Angels of Anaheim (2014); Colorado Rockies (2015, 2017, 2019–2020)

Jairo Jose Díaz Hernandaz (born May 27, 1991) is a Venezuelan former professional baseball pitcher. He made his Major League Baseball (MLB) debut with the Los Angeles Angels of Anaheim in 2014 and also played for the Colorado Rockies from 2015 to 2020, missing 2016 due to Tommy John surgery.

== Career ==
=== Los Angeles Angels of Anaheim ===
In 2014, Diaz played for the Inland Empire 66ers of the High–A California League and the Arkansas Travelers of the Double–A Texas League, and pitched to a 3.48 earned run average (ERA) with 85 strikeouts in 64 2/3 innings pitched. The Angels promoted him to the major leagues on September 8. Díaz made his MLB debut that day, recording two strikeouts.

=== Colorado Rockies ===
On December 11, 2024, the Angels traded Díaz to the Colorado Rockies in exchange for Josh Rutledge. During the 2015 season, Díaz had a 3–5 record and a 4.58 ERA with 50 strikeouts in 47 appearances for the Albuquerque Isotopes of the Triple–A Pacific Coast League and a 2.37 ERA with 18 strikeouts in 21 appearances with the Rockies. During spring training in 2016, Díaz tore a ligament in his right elbow that would require Tommy John surgery. Díaz was designated for assignment on June 10, 2018, and subsequently released on June 14. A day later, he re-signed with the Rockies to a minor league contract. He elected free agency following the season on November 2.

On December 21, 2018, Díaz re-signed to a minor league contract. He was called up on May 22, 2019, to the MLB roster. He would remain in the bullpen for the Rockies for the remainder of the season, posting a record of 6–4 in 56 games with 5 saves. In 2020, his performance regressed as he finished with a 7.65 ERA in 24 games with 4 saves. His control also worsened as he induced 14 walks in 20 innings. On April 1, 2021, Díaz was designated for assignment following the signing of Jhoulys Chacín. On April 5, Díaz was outrighted to the alternate training site. Díaz spent the 2021 season with Triple-A Albuquerque. There, he made 9 appearances and struggled to a 7.36 ERA with 10 strikeouts. On October 5, Díaz elected free agency.

=== Gastonia Honey Hunters ===
On April 6, 2022, Díaz signed a minor league contract with the Seattle Mariners. On June 7, it was announced that Díaz's deal with the Mariners had never been finalized, and that he was signing with an independent team.

On June 7, 2022, Díaz signed with the Gastonia Honey Hunters of the Atlantic League of Professional Baseball. He appeared in 4 games, going 0–1 with a 5.40 ERA and 1 strikeout in 3 1/3 innings pitched. Díaz was released by the team on July 19.

== See also ==
- List of Major League Baseball players from Venezuela
