= Stefan Crichton =

American baseball player (born 1992)

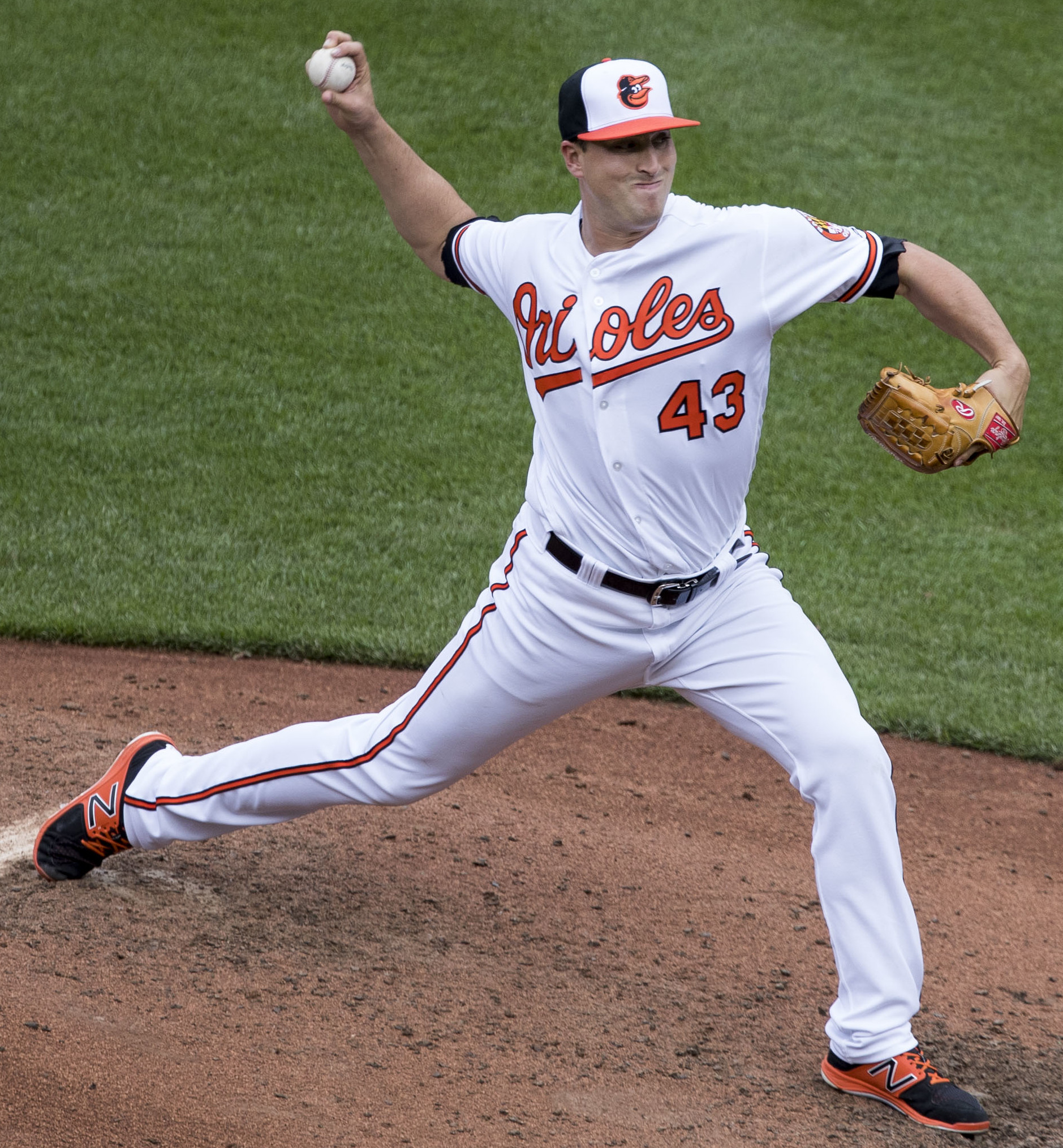
- Crichton with the Baltimore Orioles
- Pitcher
- Born: February 29, 1992 (age 33); Houston, Texas, U.S.
- Batted: Right Threw: Right

MLB debut
- April 16, 2017, for the Baltimore Orioles

Last MLB appearance
- August 1, 2021, for the Arizona Diamondbacks

MLB statistics
- Win–loss record: 3–6
- Earned run average: 4.79
- Strikeouts: 81
- Stats at Baseball Reference

Teams
- Baltimore Orioles (2017); Arizona Diamondbacks (2019–2021)

Stefan Brook Crichton (/stɛˈfɑːn ˈkraɪtən/ steh-FAHN KRY-ton; born February 29, 1992) is an American former professional baseball pitcher. He played in Major League Baseball (MLB) for the Baltimore Orioles and Arizona Diamondbacks.

== Career ==
Crichton attended Cinco Ranch High School in Katy, Texas, and played college baseball at Texas Christian University (TCU).

=== Baltimore Orioles ===
Crichton was drafted by the Baltimore Orioles in the 23rd round, 699th overall, of the 2013 Major League Baseball draft. He made his professional debut with the GCL Orioles, posting a neat 3–1 record and 1.96 ERA. The following year, Crichton played with the Low-A Aberdeen IronBirds, logging a 2–5 record and 4.47 ERA in 20 appearances. In 2015, he split the season between the High-A Frederick Keys and the Single-A Delmarva Shorebirds, accumulating a 4–4 record and 3.40 ERA in 35 games between the two teams. In 2016, he played for the Double-A Bowie Baysox, pitching to a 2–6 record and 3.73 ERA with 61 strikeouts in 72.1 innings of work. He was assigned to the Triple-A Norfolk Tides to begin the 2017 season.

On April 13, 2017, Crichton was selected to the 40-man roster called up to the major leagues for the first time. He was sent back down after the game, but recalled on April 16. He made his Major League debut the same day, where he pitched 1 2/3 innings against the Toronto Blue Jays, allowing two runs and striking out two batters. He split the year between Norfolk and Baltimore, posting a nice 7–3 record and 3.02 ERA in 29 games with Norfolk, but a less appealing 8.03 ERA in 8 major league games with the Orioles. Crichton was designated for assignment by Baltimore on March 29, 2018.

=== Arizona Diamondbacks ===
On April 2, 2018, the Orioles traded Crichton to the Arizona Diamondbacks in exchange for a player to be named later or cash. He was assigned to the Triple-A Reno Aces to begin the season. Crichton was released by Arizona on June 23, but was promptly re-signed to a minor league contract on June 27. He finished the year with an ugly 10.13 ERA in 14 games with Reno.

Crichton was invited to Spring Training as a non-roster invitee in 2019, but did not make the team and opened the 2019 season back in Triple-A Reno. On May 28, 2019, Crichton was selected to the active roster. On the year, Crichton recorded a 1–0 record and 3.56 ERA in 28 appearances, with 33 strikeouts in 30 1/3 innings of work. In 2020 for the Arizona, Crichton logged a 2.42 ERA with 5 saves in 23.0 innings pitched.

The following year, Crichton struggled to an 0–4 and 6.04 ERA in his first 29 appearances before being designated for assignment by Arizona on June 23, 2021. He was outrighted to Triple-A Reno on June 27. On July 30, Arizona selected his contract and promoted him to the active roster. On August 2, Crichton was returned to Triple-A, having been a COVID-19 replacement player at the time of his most recent call-up. He underwent Tommy John surgery later that season, and missed the remainder of the year. In 2022, he played in four games for in Reno after rehabbing from surgery, struggling to an 8.10 ERA with two strikeouts in 3 1/3 innings of work.

Crichton was invited to Spring Training with the Diamondbacks in 2023 as a non-roster invitee. However, on February 27, 2023, Crichton announced his retirement from professional baseball.

== Personal life ==
Crichton was born on February 29, 1992, in Houston, Texas. He was only the fourteenth Major Leaguer to be born a leap day.
