= Ryan Castellani =

American baseball player (born 1996)

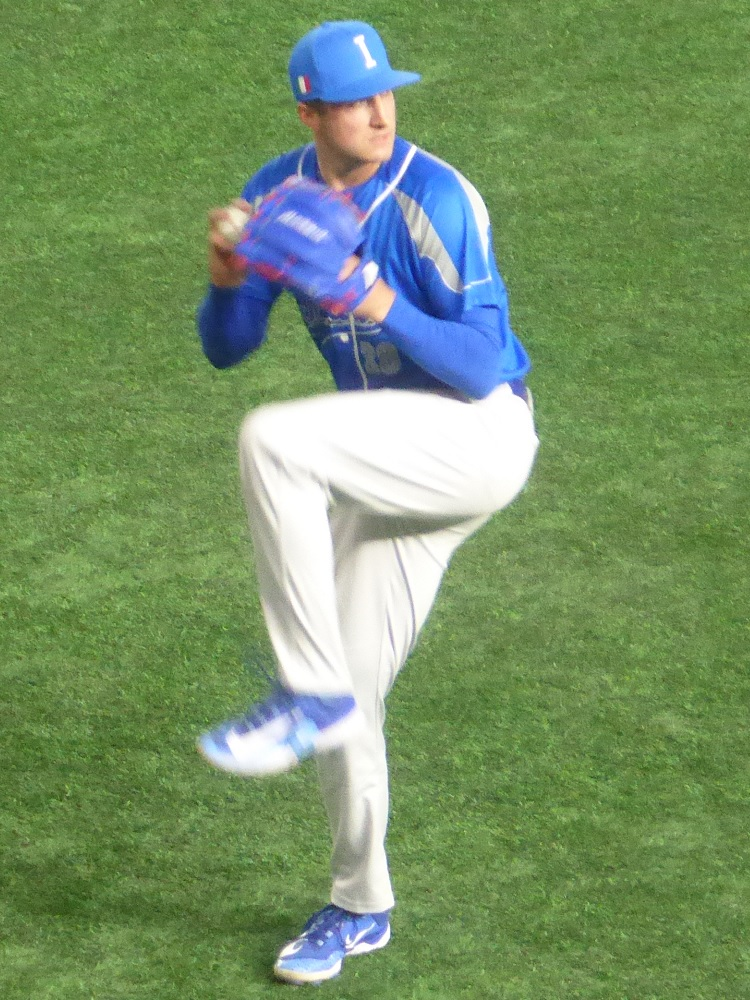
- Castellani with Team Italy in the 2023 WBC Tournament
- Pitcher
- Born: April 1, 1996 (age 30); Philadelphia, Pennsylvania, U.S.
- Batted: Right Threw: Right

MLB debut
- August 8, 2020, for the Colorado Rockies

Last MLB appearance
- April 22, 2022, for the Oakland Athletics

MLB statistics
- Win–loss record: 1–4
- Earned run average: 5.47
- Strikeouts: 28
- Stats at Baseball Reference

Teams
- Colorado Rockies (2020–2021); Oakland Athletics (2022)

Ryan Michael Castellani (born April 1, 1996) is an American former professional baseball pitcher. He has previously played in Major League Baseball (MLB) for the Colorado Rockies and Oakland Athletics. Born in the United States, he has represented the Italy national baseball team.

== Amateur career ==
Castellani attended Brophy College Preparatory in Phoenix, Arizona. He was drafted by the Colorado Rockies in the second round of the 2014 Major League Baseball draft and signed.

== Professional career ==
=== Colorado Rockies ===
Castellani made his professional debut that year with the Tri-City Dust Devils and spent the whole season there, going 1–2 with a 3.65 ERA in ten starts. Castellani spent 2015 with the Asheville Tourists where he was 2–7 with a 4.45 ERA in 27 starts, and 2016 with the Modesto Nuts where he posted a 7–8 record with a 3.81 ERA in 26 starts. In 2017, he pitched for the Hartford Yard Goats, pitching to a 9–2 record and 4.81 ERA in 27 games started. He spent 2018 with Hartford, going 7–9 with a 5.49 ERA in 26 starts.

The Rockies added Castellani to their 40-man roster after the 2018 season. He also made it 7 starts with the Salt River Rafters of the Arizona Fall League following the 2018 season. He spent 2019 with the Albuquerque Isotopes, pitching to a 2–5 record and an 8.31 ERA over ten starts, striking out 47 over 43 1/3 innings. He returned to the Salt River Rafters following 2019. On June 23, 2020, it was announced that Castellani had tested positive for COVID-19. He returned in time for the start of summer camp on July 4.

Castellani made his major league debut with the Rockies on August 8, 2020, against the Seattle Mariners, retiring the first 12 batters he faced. In his rookie year, Castellani logged a 1–4 record and 5.82 ERA in 10 appearances.

Castellani only made one appearance for the Rockies in 2021, giving up 2 runs in 3 1/3 innings, before he was designated for assignment on June 24, 2021. He was outrighted to Triple-A Albuquerque on June 30. He elected free agency on November 7, 2021.

=== Oakland Athletics ===
On November 23, 2021, Castellani signed a minor league contract with the Oakland Athletics. He spent time with the Athletics in spring training, and was optioned to minor league camp before the 2022 season began. On April 15, 2022, Castellani was added to the Athletics roster for their road trip to Toronto as a COVID-related substitute. Castellani made 3 scoreless appearances for Oakland, striking out one in 2.2 innings of work. On April 29, he was removed from the 40-man roster and returned to the Triple-A Las Vegas Aviators. He struggled to an 11.97 ERA in 26 games for Las Vegas before he was released on July 28, 2022.

=== Gastonia Honey Hunters ===
On February 13, 2023, Castellani signed with the Kansas City Monarchs of the American Association of Professional Baseball. Prior to the start of the AA season, on May 1, Castellani was traded to the Gastonia Honey Hunters of the Atlantic League of Professional Baseball in exchange for future considerations. He became a free agent following the season after not appearing in a game.

=== Algodoneros de Unión Laguna ===
On May 6, 2024, Castellani signed with the Algodoneros de Unión Laguna of the Mexican League. In 7 starts for Unión Laguna, he struggled immensely, going 0–2 with a 7.33 ERA with more walks (20) than strikeouts (13) across 27 innings pitched. Castellani was released on July 22.

== World Baseball Classic ==
Castellani opened two games for Team Italy in the World Baseball Classic in March 2023, with two earned runs and three strikeouts over four innings.
