= 2020 Los Angeles Dodgers season =

Major League Baseball shortened 60-game season

2020 Los Angeles Dodgers
- World Series champions National League champions National League West champions
- League: National League
- Division: West
- Ballpark: Dodger Stadium
- City: Los Angeles, California
- Record: 43–17 (.717)
- Divisional place: 1st
- Owners: Guggenheim Baseball Management
- President: Stan Kasten
- President of baseball operations: Andrew Friedman
- Managers: Dave Roberts
- Television: Spectrum SportsNet LA (Joe Davis or Tim Neverett, Orel Hershiser or Nomar Garciaparra, Alanna Rizzo) (Spanish audio feed) (Pepe Yñiguez, Fernando Valenzuela, Manny Mota)
- Radio: KLAC-AM; Los Angeles Dodgers Radio Network (Charley Steiner, Tim Neverett, Rick Monday); KTNQ (Jaime Jarrín, Jorge Jarrin); KMPC (Korean language broadcast)

The 2020 Los Angeles Dodgers season was the 131st season for the franchise in Major League Baseball (MLB), and their 63rd season in Los Angeles, California. They played their home games at Dodger Stadium. The Dodgers went 43–17 during the COVID-19 shortened regular-season, and went on to win their first World Series championship since 1988 and seventh overall, defeating the Tampa Bay Rays 4 games to 2.

On March 12, 2020, MLB announced that because of the ongoing COVID-19 pandemic, the start of the regular season would be delayed by at least two weeks in addition to the remainder of spring training being cancelled. Four days later, it was announced that the start of the season would be pushed back indefinitely due to the recommendation made by the Centers for Disease Control and Prevention (CDC) to restrict events of more than 50 people for eight weeks. On June 23, commissioner Rob Manfred unilaterally implemented a 60-game season. Players reported to training camps on July 1 in order to resume spring training and prepare for a July 23 Opening Day.

The 2020 Dodgers started the season 30–10, matching the best 40-game start in franchise history. The last such Dodgers start came in 1977, along with the Brooklyn teams in 1888 and 1955. This was also the best 40-game start in the majors since the 116-win Mariners began 31–9 in 2001. The Dodgers led MLB in runs scored (349), home runs (118) and slugging percentage (.483, tied with the Atlanta Braves). The Dodgers finished the regular season 43–17, winning their eighth straight division title, and swept both the Milwaukee Brewers in the NLWCS and the San Diego Padres in the NLDS. They then defeated the Braves in the NLCS to advance to the World Series against the Tampa Bay Rays, their third World Series appearance in the last four years and their 24th pennant in franchise history, surpassing the San Francisco Giants for the most in the National League. The Dodgers would then go on to defeat the Rays in six games, winning their first World Series since 1988, their sixth since moving to Los Angeles, and the seventh in franchise history.

The team's regular season .717 winning percentage is the highest of the post-1960 expansion era. Had the team finished a 162-game season at the same pace, they would have tied the 1906 Chicago Cubs and 2001 Seattle Mariners with a record 116 wins.

== Offseason ==
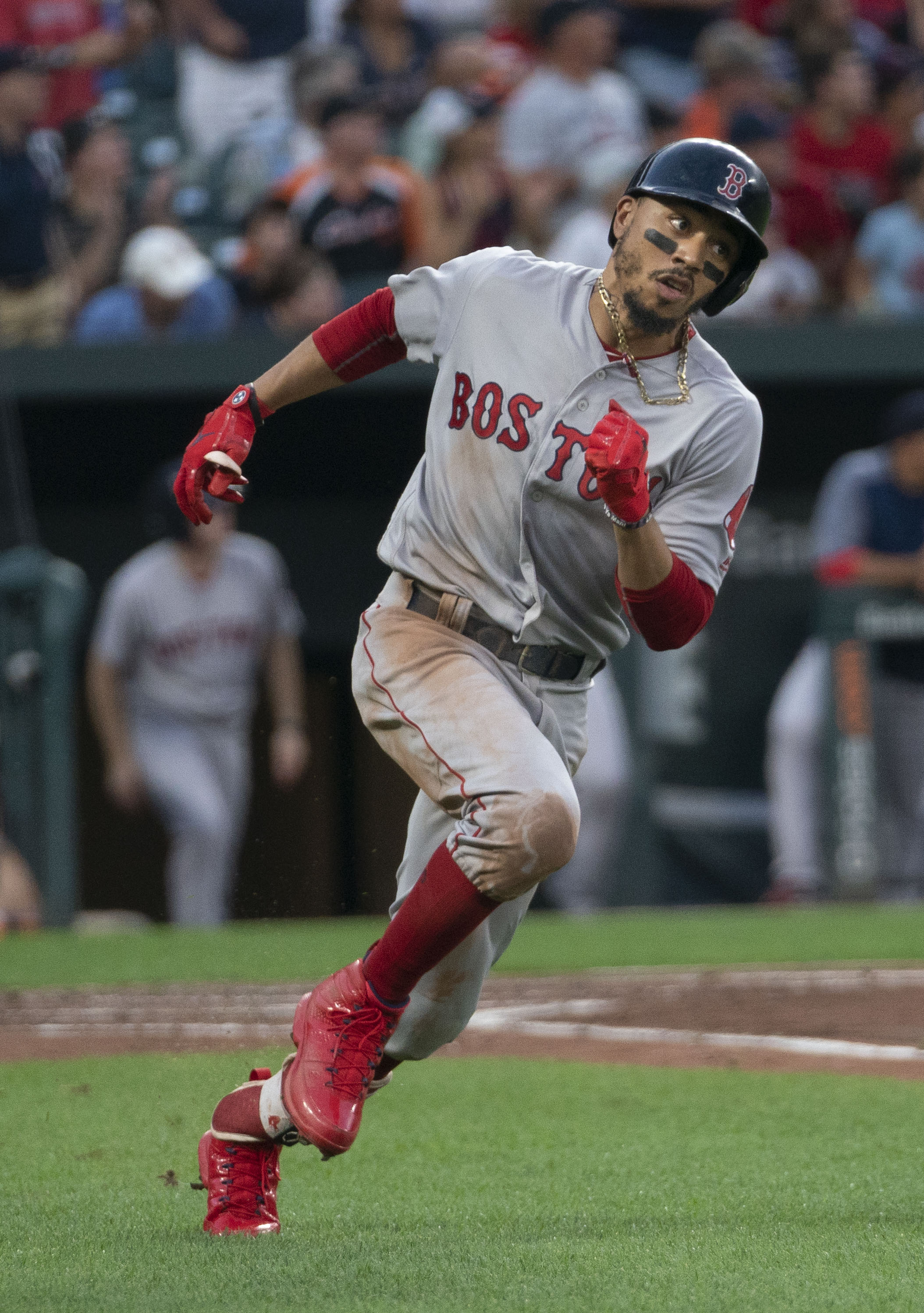
The Dodgers big offseason acquisition was a trade with the Boston Red Sox for All-Star Outfielder Mookie Betts.

=== Front Office / Coaching staff ===
On October 14, 2019, the Dodgers announced that long-time pitching coach Rick Honeycutt would be stepping down from the position to take on a new position with the organization and that he would be replaced by bullpen coach Mark Prior. Josh Bard, who served as the Dodgers bullpen coach in 2016 and 2017 before leaving to join the New York Yankees coaching staff, returned to take his old role. The Dodgers also added Connor McGuinness as the assistant pitching coach and Danny Lehmann as Game Planning Coach, replacing Chris Gimenez.

=== Roster departures ===
On October 12, 2019, infielder David Freese announced his retirement from baseball. On October 31, the day after the conclusion of the 2019 World Series, starting pitchers Hyun-jin Ryu and Rich Hill and catcher Russell Martin became free agents. On November 3, the Dodgers declined the 2020 option on utility player Jedd Gyorko, making him a free agent. On November 12, utility player Kristopher Negrón announced his retirement from baseball. On December 2, the Dodgers non-tendered relief pitcher Yimi García, making him a free agent. On December 28, the Dodgers released pitcher J. T. Chargois. Pitcher Casey Sadler was designated for assignment on January 15, 2020. On February 10, the Dodgers designated infielder Tyler White and outfielder Kyle Garlick for assignment.

=== Free agent signings ===
On December 15, 2019, the Dodgers signed relief pitcher Blake Treinen to a one-year, $10 million, contract. On January 7, 2020, the Dodgers signed pitcher Jimmy Nelson to one-year, $1.25 million, contract that also included an option for 2021 and numerous contract bonuses. On January 12, the Dodgers signed left handed starter Alex Wood to a one-year, $4 million contract.

=== Trades ===
On February 10, 2020, the Dodgers traded outfielder Alex Verdugo and minor leaguers Connor Wong and Jeter Downs to the Boston Red Sox in exchange for outfielder Mookie Betts, starting pitcher David Price and cash considerations. They also traded starting pitcher Kenta Maeda, minor leaguer Jaír Camargo and cash considerations to the Minnesota Twins for pitcher Brusdar Graterol, outfielder Luke Raley and the 67th pick in the 2020 Major League Baseball draft.

Off-season 40-man roster moves

Departing Player	Date	Transaction	New Team	Arriving player	Old team	Date	Transaction
David Freese	October 12	Retirement	N/A	Victor González	Oklahoma City Dodgers	October 31	Added to 40 man roster
Rich Hill	October 31	Free agent	Minnesota Twins	Zach McKinstry	Oklahoma City Dodgers	November 20	Added to 40 man roster
Russell Martin	October 31	Free agent	N/A	D. J. Peters	Oklahoma City Dodgers	November 20	Added to 40 man roster
Hyun-jin Ryu	October 31	Free agent	Toronto Blue Jays	Mitchell White	Oklahoma City Dodgers	November 20	Added to 40 man roster
Jedd Gyorko	November 3	Option declined	Milwaukee Brewers	Blake Treinen	Oakland Athletics	December 15	Free agent signing
Kristopher Negrón	November 12	Retirement	N/A	Jimmy Nelson	Milwaukee Brewers	January 7	Free agent signing
Yimi García	December 2	Non-tendered	Miami Marlins	Alex Wood	Cincinnati Reds	January 12	Free agent signing
J. T. Chargois	December 28	Released	Rakuten Eagles	Mookie Betts	Boston Red Sox	February 10	Trade
Casey Sadler	January 15	Designated for Assignment	Chicago Cubs	David Price	Boston Red Sox	February 10	Trade
Alex Verdugo	February 10	Trade	Boston Red Sox	Brusdar Graterol	Minnesota Twins	February 10	Trade
Kenta Maeda	February 10	Trade	Minnesota Twins	Luke Raley	Minnesota Twins	February 10	Trade
Kyle Garlick	February 10	Designated for assignment	Philadelphia Phillies				
Tyler White	February 10	Designated for assignment	Oklahoma City Dodgers				

== Spring Training / Summer Camp ==
Spring Training non-roster invitees

Player	Position	2019 team(s)
Brett de Geus	Pitcher	Great Lakes Loons / Rancho Cucamonga Quakes
Josiah Gray	Pitcher	Great Lakes Loons / Rancho Cucamonga Quakes / Tulsa Drillers
Reymin Guduan	Pitcher	Round Rock Express / Houston Astros
Marshall Kasowski	Pitcher	Tulsa Drillers
Kyle Lobstein	Pitcher	Las Vegas Aviators
Zach McAllister	Pitcher	Oklahoma City Dodgers
Edubray Ramos	Pitcher	Lehigh Valley IronPigs / Philadelphia Phillies
Jordan Sheffield	Pitcher	Rancho Cucamonga Quakes / Tulsa Drillers
Edwin Uceta	Pitcher	Rancho Cucamonga Quakes / Tulsa Drillers
Rocky Gale	Catcher	Tulsa Drillers / Oklahoma City Dodgers / Durham Bulls / Los Angeles Dodgers
José Lobatón	Catcher	Tacoma Rainiers / Oklahoma City Dodgers
Jacob Amaya	Infielder	Great Lakes Loons / Rancho Cucamonga Quakes
Omar Estevez	Infielder	Tulsa Drillers
Connor Joe	Infielder / Outfielder	Tulsa Drillers / Oklahoma City Dodgers / San Francisco Giants
Cristian Santana	Infielder	Tulsa Drillers
Tyler White	Infielder	Houston Astros / Los Angeles Dodgers
Anthony García	Outfielder	Sacramento River Cats
Terrance Gore	Outfielder	Scranton/Wilkes-Barre RailRiders / Kansas City Royals
Jeren Kendall	Outfielder	Rancho Cucamonga Quakes
Zach Reks	Outfielder	Tulsa Drillers / Oklahoma City Dodgers
Cody Thomas	Outfielder	Tulsa Drillers

Spring Training for the Dodgers began on February 13, 2020, when pitchers and catchers reported to Camelback Ranch in Glendale, Arizona. Position players reported the following day and the first Cactus League game was played on February 22.

On February 29, the Dodgers designated pitcher Yadier Álvarez for assignment. He had been on the restricted list from the previous season as a result of disciplinary issues in the minor leagues. He showed up for camp but was unable to make his first spring start due to injury and they designated him the following day.

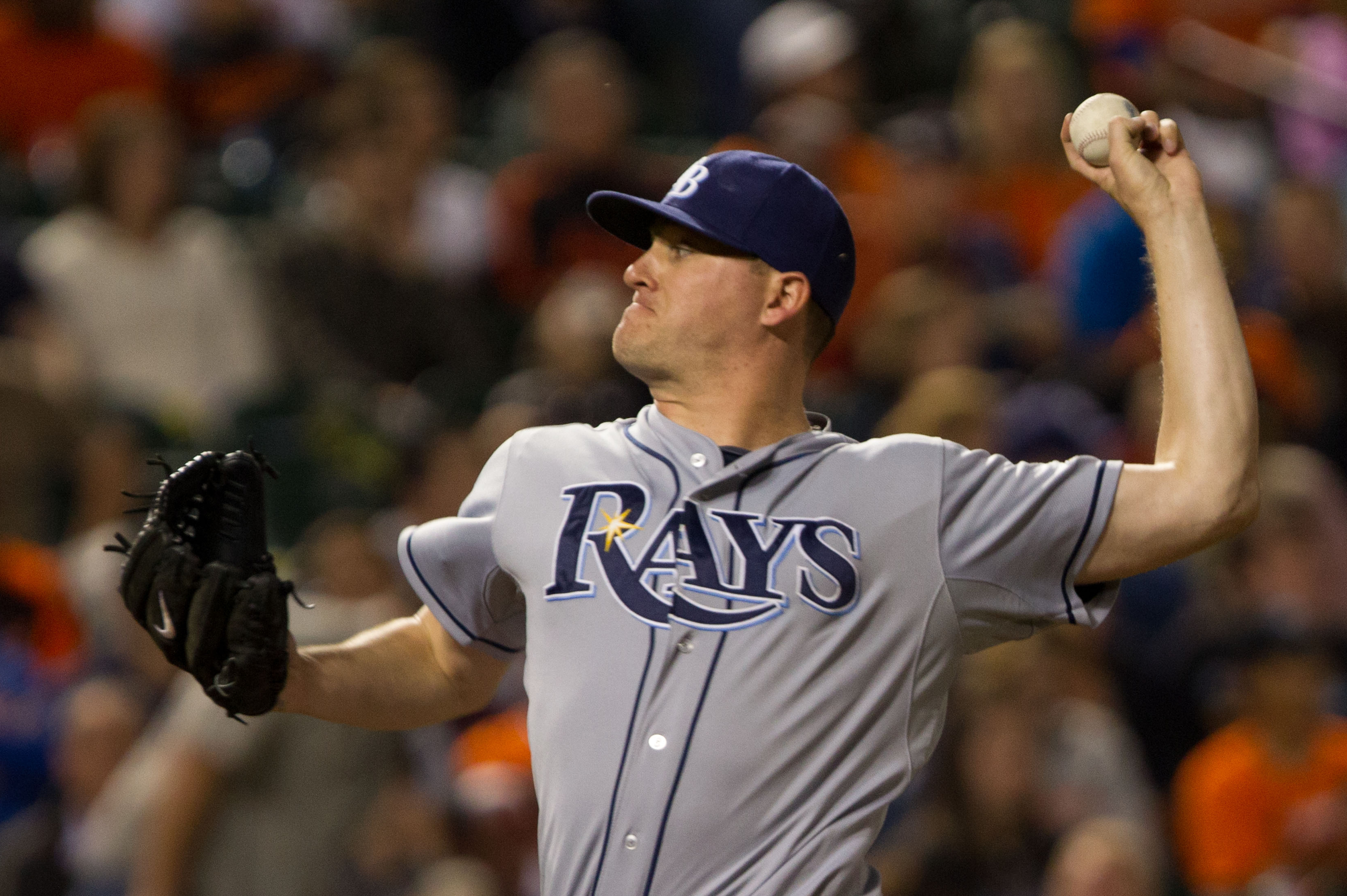
Pitcher Jake McGee was signed as a free agent during Summer Camp

On March 12, Major League Baseball cancelled the remaining spring training games and announced that the start of the regular season would be delayed by at least two weeks, due to the coronavirus pandemic.

After extensive discussion between the players and ownership over the status of the season, on June 23, the league announced that players would report to the home stadiums by July 1 and that a second training camp would begin two days later with the season to begin on July 24, without fans in the stands. A number of rule changes would also be instituted for the new season, such as having a DH in both leagues and placing a runner on second to begin extra innings.

On July 4, David Price announced that due to the pandemic he would opt out of playing in the 2020 season. Pitcher Jimmy Nelson announced that he would undergo surgery on his lower back on July 7, and would miss the entire season. On July 21, the Dodgers signed pitcher Jake McGee to a one-year contract and announced that second baseman Gavin Lux would not make the opening day roster. At the conclusion of the summer camp, they announced that Ross Stripling would take Price's spot in the starting rotation. On July 22, the Dodgers signed Mookie Betts to a 12-year contract extension, through the 2032 season. The deal was worth $365 million and also included a $65 million signing bonus, making it the richest contract in Dodgers history.

== Regular season ==
=== Season standings ===
NL West
Team	W	L	Pct.	GB	Home	Road
Los Angeles Dodgers	43	17	.717	—	21‍–‍9	22‍–‍8
San Diego Padres	37	23	.617	6	21‍–‍11	16‍–‍12
San Francisco Giants	29	31	.483	14	19‍–‍14	10‍–‍17
Colorado Rockies	26	34	.433	17	12‍–‍18	14‍–‍16
Arizona Diamondbacks	25	35	.417	18	16‍–‍14	9‍–‍21

Wild Card standings

Division leaders
Team	W	L	Pct.
Los Angeles Dodgers	43	17	.717
Atlanta Braves	35	25	.583
Chicago Cubs	34	26	.567

Division 2nd place
Team	W	L	Pct.
San Diego Padres	37	23	.617
St. Louis Cardinals	30	28	.517
Miami Marlins	31	29	.517

Wild Card teams (Top 2 teams qualify for postseason)
Team	W	L	Pct.	GB
Cincinnati Reds	31	29	.517	+2
Milwaukee Brewers	29	31	.483	—
San Francisco Giants	29	31	.483	—
Philadelphia Phillies	28	32	.467	1
Washington Nationals	26	34	.433	3
New York Mets	26	34	.433	3
Colorado Rockies	26	34	.433	3
Arizona Diamondbacks	25	35	.417	4
Pittsburgh Pirates	19	41	.317	10

=== Game log ===
On July 6, MLB issued a new revised schedule for the season to start in July. The Dodgers will play 60 games, 10 games each against their division opponents, and 20 interleague games against opponents from the AL West Division.

2020 Game Log : 43-17 (Home: 21-9; Away: 22-8)
July : 5-3 (Home: 2-2; Away: 3-1)

#	Date	Opponent	Score	Win	Loss	Save	Record
1	July 23	Giants	**W** 8–1	**Kolarek** (1–0)	Rogers (0–1)	—	1–0
2	July 24	Giants	**W** 9–1	**Stripling** (1–0)	Anderson (0–1)	—	2–0
3	July 25	Giants	L 4–5	Baragar (1–0)	**Wood** (0–1)	Gott (1)	2–1
4	July 26	Giants	L 1–3	Peralta (1–0)	**Graterol** (0–1)	Gott (2)	2–2
5	July 28	@ Astros	**W** 5–2	**Graterol** (1–1)	Valdez (0–1)	**Jansen** (1)	3–2
6	July 29	@ Astros	**W** 4–2 (13)	**Santana** (1–0)	Sneed (0–1)	—	4–2
7	July 30	@ Diamondbacks	**W** 6–3	**Stripling** (2–0)	Ray (0–2)	**Báez** (1)	5–2
8	July 31	@ Diamondbacks	L 3–5	Rondón (1–0)	**Treinen** (0–1)	Bradley (2)	5–3

August : 21-7 (Home: 9-3; Away: 12-4)

#	Date	Opponent	Score	Win	Loss	Save	Record
9	August 1	@ Diamondbacks	**W** 11–2	**Urías** (1–0)	Weaver (0–2)	—	6–3
10	August 2	@ Diamondbacks	**W** 3–0	**Kershaw** (1–0)	Kelly (1–1)	**Jansen** (2)	7–3
11	August 3	@ Padres	L 4–5	Paddack (2–0)	**Graterol** (1–2)	Yates (1)	7–4
12	August 4	@ Padres	**W** 5–2	**May** (1–0)	Stammen (1–1)	**Jansen** (3)	8–4
13	August 5	@ Padres	**W** 7–6	**Stripling** (3–0)	Richards (0–1)	**Jansen** (4)	9–4
14	August 7	Giants	**W** 7–2	**Floro** (1–0)	Samardzija (0–2)	—	10–4
15	August 8	Giants	L 4–5	Cueto (1–0)	**Kershaw** (1–1)	Gott (4)	10–5
16	August 9	Giants	**W** 6–2	**McGee** (1–0)	Rogers (1–3)	—	11–5
17	August 10	Padres	L 1–2	Quantrill (2–0)	**May** (1–1)	Pomeranz (3)	11–6
18	August 11	Padres	L 2–6	Richards (1–1)	**Stripling** (3–1)	Pomeranz (4)	11–7
19	August 12	Padres	**W** 6–0	**Treinen** (1–1)	Davies (2–2)	—	12–7
20	August 13	Padres	**W** 11–2	**Urías** (2–0)	Paddack (2–2)	—	13–7
21	August 14	@ Angels	**W** 7–4	**Kershaw** (2–1)	Sandoval (0–2)	**Jansen** (5)	14–7
22	August 15	@ Angels	**W** 6–5 (10)	**McGee** (2–0)	Middleton (0–1)	**Jansen** (6)	15–7
23	August 16	@ Angels	**W** 8–3	**Alexander** (1–0)	Teherán (0–2)	—	16–7
24	August 17	Mariners	**W** 11–9	**Ferguson** (1–0)	Magill (0–1)	**Jansen** (7)	17–7
25	August 18	Mariners	**W** 2–1	**Treinen** (2–1)	Altavilla (1–2)	—	18–7
26	August 19	@ Mariners	L 4–6	Walker (2–2)	**Santana** (1–1)	Williams (4)	18–8
27	August 20	@ Mariners	**W** 6–1	**Kershaw** (3–1)	Kikuchi (0–2)	—	19–8
28	August 21	Rockies	**W** 5–1	**Buehler** (1–0)	Gray (1–3)	—	20–8
29	August 22	Rockies	**W** 4–3	**Jansen** (1–0)	Bard (1–2)	—	21–8
30	August 23	Rockies	**W** 11–3	**González** (1–0)	Senzatela (3–1)	—	22–8
31	August 25	@ Giants	L 8–10 (11)	Selman (1–0)	**Santana** (1–2)	—	22–9
–	August 26	@ Giants	Postponed (Boycotts due to Jacob Blake shooting); Makeup: August 27				
32	August 27 (1)	@ Giants	**W** 7–0 (7)	**Kershaw** (4–1)	Webb (2–3)	—	23–9
33	August 27 (2)	@ Giants	**W** 2–0 (7)	**González** (2–0)	Gausman (1–2)	**Jansen** (8)	24–9
34	August 28	@ Rangers	L 2–6	Hernández (4–0)	**McGee** (2–1)	—	24–10
35	August 29	@ Rangers	**W** 7–4	**Treinen** (3–1)	Lynn (4–1)	**Jansen** (9)	25–10
36	August 30	@ Rangers	**W** 7–2	**Alexander** (2–0)	Gibson (1–4)	—	26–10

September : 17–7 (Home: 10-4; Away: 7-3)

#	Date	Opponent	Score	Win	Loss	Save	Record
37	September 1	Diamondbacks	**W** 6–3	**Urías** (3–0)	Young (1–2)	**Jansen** (10)	27–10
38	September 2	Diamondbacks	**W** 3–2 (10)	**Jansen** (2–0)	Guerra (1–1)	—	28–10
39	September 3	Diamondbacks	**W** 5–1	**Kershaw** (5–1)	Weaver (1–6)	—	29–10
40	September 4	Rockies	**W** 10–6	**Ferguson** (2–0)	Estévez (1–1)	—	30–10
41	September 5	Rockies	L 2–5	Almonte (2–0)	**Treinen** (3–2)	Bard (5)	30–11
42	September 6	Rockies	L 6–7	Almonte (3–0)	**Ferguson** (2–1)	Bard (6)	30–12
43	September 8	@ Diamondbacks	**W** 10–9 (10)	**Jansen** (3–0)	López (0–1)	—	31–12
44	September 9	@ Diamondbacks	**W** 6–4 (10)	**McGee** (3–1)	Ginkel (0–2)	**Treinen** (1)	32–12
45	September 10	@ Diamondbacks	L 2–5	Smith (1–0)	**Gonsolin** (0–1)	Bergen (1)	32–13
46	September 12	Astros	L 5–7	James (1–0)	**Jansen** (3–1)	Pressly (9)	32–14
47	September 13	Astros	**W** 8–1	**González** (3–0)	Greinke (3–2)	—	33–14
48	September 14	@ Padres	L 2–7	Lamet (3–1)	**Kershaw** (5–2)	—	33–15
49	September 15	@ Padres	**W** 3–1	**Gonsolin** (1–1)	Davies (7–3)	**Jansen** (11)	34–15
50	September 16	@ Padres	**W** 7–5	**Kolarek** (3–0)	Morejón (2–1)	**Báez** (2)	35–15
51	September 17	@ Rockies	**W** 9–3	**Floro** (2–0)	Freeland (2–2)	—	36–15
52	September 18	@ Rockies	**W** 15–6	**White** (1–0)	Castellani (1–3)	—	37–15
53	September 19	@ Rockies	**W** 6–1	**Kershaw** (6–2)	Gonzalez (0–2)	—	38–15
54	September 20	@ Rockies	L 3–6	Senzatela (5–2)	**Gonsolin** (1–2)	Givens (1)	38–16
55	September 22	Athletics	**W** 7–2	**May** (2–1)	Montas (3–5)	—	39–16
56	September 23	Athletics	L 4–6	Diekman (1–0)	**Treinen** (3–3)	Hendriks (14)	39–17
57	September 24	Athletics	**W** 5–1	**Floro** (3–0)	Fiers (6–3)	—	40–17
58	September 25	Angels	**W** 9–5	**Graterol** (1–2)	Andriese (2–4)	—	41–17
59	September 26	Angels	**W** 7–6	**Gonsolin** (2–2)	Robles (0–2)	**Kolarek** (1)	42–17
60	September 27	Angels	**W** 5–0	**May** (3–1)	Sandoval (1–5)	—	43–17

Legend: = Win = Loss = Postponement
Bold = Dodgers team member

=== Opening day ===
Opening Day starters
Name	Position
Max Muncy	First baseman
Mookie Betts	Right fielder
Cody Bellinger	Center fielder
Justin Turner	Third baseman
Corey Seager	Shortstop
Kiké Hernández	Second baseman
Joc Pederson	Left fielder
A. J. Pollock	Designated hitter
Austin Barnes	Catcher
Dustin May	Starting pitcher

=== Season summary ===
==== July ====
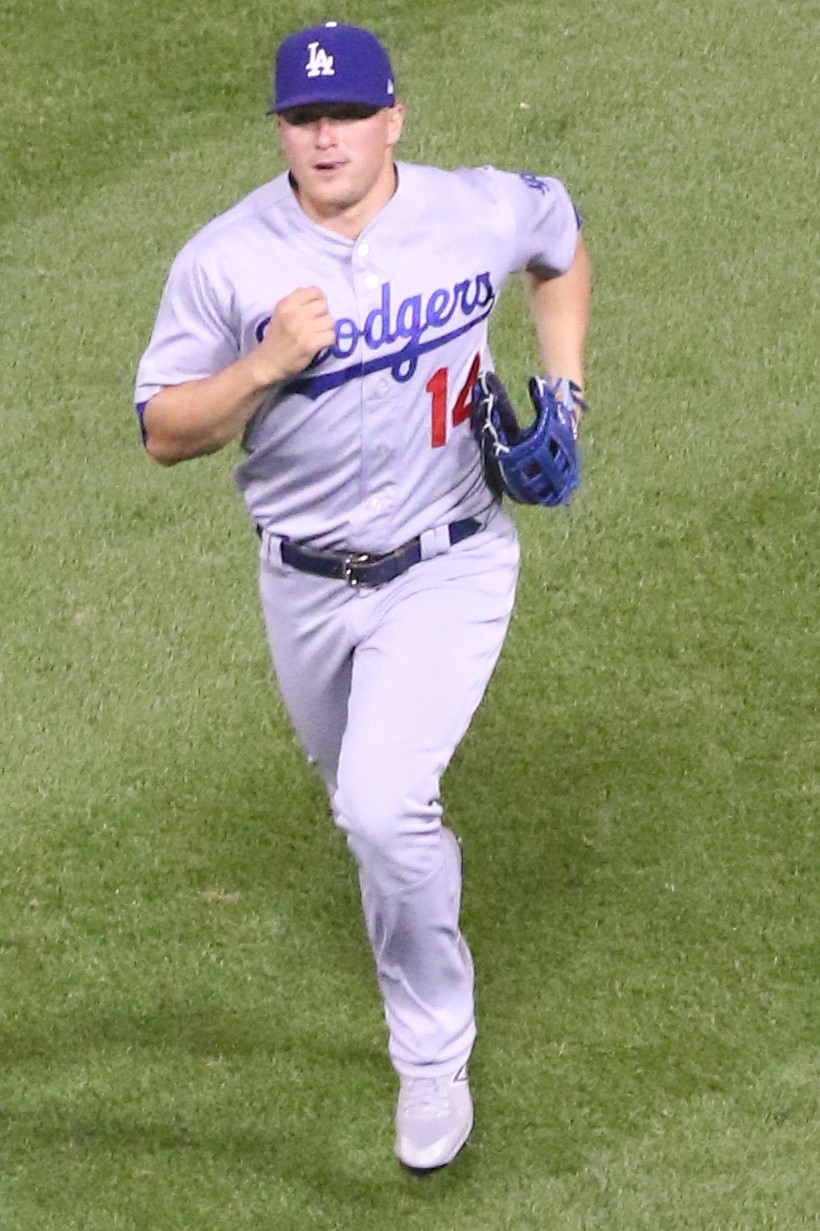
Kiké Hernández drove in five runs on four hits in the Dodgers Opening Day win

The Dodgers finally began the season on July 23 against the San Francisco Giants at Dodger Stadium. Dustin May started on Opening Day after Clayton Kershaw was scratched with a bad back. Kiké Hernández drove in five runs on four hits, including a home run as the Dodgers won 8–1. In the second game, Ross Stripling allowed only four hits in seven innings while Max Muncy hit two homers in a 9–1 win. However, in the third game, the Giants beat the Dodgers, 5–4, a shaky Alex Wood allowed three runs in only three innings of work. The Giants beat the Dodgers on July 26 to finish the opening four game series with a split.

In their first road series of the season, the Dodgers beat the Houston Astros 5–2 at Minute Maid Park on July 28. Reliever Joe Kelly was suspended for eight games after throwing at Alex Bregman and Carlos Correa in the game. In the following game, Edwin Ríos hit a two-run home run in the 13th inning as the Dodgers won, 4–2, to sweep the two game series. In the next series, the Dodgers took on the Arizona Diamondbacks for four games at Chase Field, starting with a 6–3 win, which included three home runs (by A.J. Pollock, Corey Seager, and Max Muncy). However the bullpen melted down in the 8th inning in the following game, as they lost 5–3.

==== August ====
In the third game of the series, Edwin Ríos, A. J. Pollock, Matt Beaty, and Chris Taylor each homered as the Dodgers routed the Diamondbacks 11–2. In the final game of the series, Clayton Kershaw made his season debut, pitched 5 2/3 scoreless innings and Cody Bellinger and Mookie Betts each homered as the Dodgers shut out the Diamondbacks 3–0 to take the series. The Dodgers next began a three-game series at Petco Park against the San Diego Padres, with the Padres taking game one of the series, 5–4, thanks to three home runs. The next night, Dustin May struck out a career high eight batters in six innings to pick up his first win of the season in the Dodgers 5–2 victory. Joc Pederson homered twice as the Dodgers withstood a late comeback to hold off the Padres 7–6 to take the series.

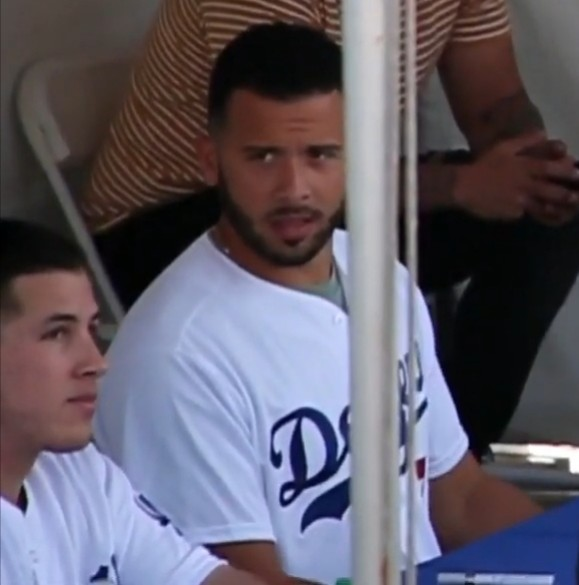
Rookie Edwin Ríos hit eight home runs on the season

The Dodgers returned home to begin a seven-game homestand, starting with a three-game weekend series with the Giants. In the series opener, Will Smith, Betts, Max Muncy and Ríos each homered as the Dodgers won 7–2. Kershaw allowed three home runs in the next game and the Dodgers lost 5–4. In the final game of the series, the Dodger offense was silent and trailed 2–0 until Pollock and Betts each hit three-run homers in the seventh and eighth innings respectively to lead the Dodgers to a 6–2 victory to take the series from the Giants. The Padres were the Dodgers next opponent, and beat them in the opener 2–1 in a pitchers' duel in the first game and 6–2 in the second game, with a grand slam homer by Manny Machado being the key hit. In the following game, Tony Gonsolin struck out eight batters in his second start of the season and Justin Turner hit a three-run homer as the Dodgers won 6–0. In the final game of the series with the Padres, the Dodgers slugged six home runs (including three from Mookie Betts) to pick up a 11–2 victory and a split of the series.

The Dodgers next trip was a three-game set against the Los Angeles Angels at Angel Stadium. They won the opener 7–4 on two homers by Cody Bellinger as Clayton Kershaw only allowed one hit in seven innings. The Dodgers took the next game as well, edging the Angels, 6–5 in 10 innings as Betts homered and had three RBI in the game. They finished off the sweep the next day, 8–3. Keibert Ruiz in his Major League debut homered in his first at-bat, one of four homers hit by the Dodgers in the rout.

The Dodgers next played the Seattle Mariners for four games, with the first two being at Dodger Stadium in Los Angeles and the second pair being at T-Mobile Park in Seattle. They won the opener 11–9 in a back-and-forth battle when the Dodgers scored five runs in the seventh inning to respond to the Mariners scoring five runs in the third inning. Corey Seager and his brother, Mariners Third-Baseman Kyle Seager, both homered in the game, becoming the first pair of brothers to homer in the same game since César and Felipe Crespo did it on June 7, 2001. In the next game, the Dodgers won 2–1 with Austin Barnes scoring both runs. In the first game in Seattle, the Mariners won 6–4 thanks to a three-run homer by Austin Nola. The Dodgers wrapped up the series with a 6–1 win on August 20, Kershaw struck out 11 while allowing only four hits in seven innings and in the process passed Don Drysdale for the second most strikeouts in Dodgers franchise history.

The Dodgers returned home to face the Colorado Rockies for a brief three game weekend series. In the series opener, the Dodgers beat the Rockies 6–1 behind Walker Buehler strong pitching performance, striking out 11 while allowing one earned run and four hits. In the second game of the series, Bellinger hit a walk-off home run to propel the Dodgers to a 4–3 victory. The Dodgers swept the series by hitting seven home runs, including two by Mookie Betts, in a 11–3 rout over the Rockies.

On August 25, the Dodgers began a six-game road trip, starting with three against the Giants at Oracle Park. The Dodgers blew three save opportunities in the opener and lost, 10–8, on a walk-off homer by Donovan Solano. The Dodgers and Giants chose not to play on August 26, as a unified protest against the Jacob Blake shooting, instead playing a double-header of seven inning games on the 27th. In the first game of the doubleheader, Kershaw pitched six scoreless innings, striking out four batters as the Dodgers shut out the Giants 7–0. Joc Pederson homered and scored both runs as the Dodgers won 2–0 in the second game. The Dodgers next faced the Texas Rangers at Globe Life Field. The bullpen struggled in the opener and the Dodgers lost to the Rangers, 6–2. Bellinger and Muncy homered as the Dodgers evened the series with a 7–4 win the following day. The Dodgers wrapped up the road trip with a 7–2 win. Seager, Smith, and Bellinger each homered as the Dodgers set a new National League record with 57 home runs in a calendar month.

==== September ====
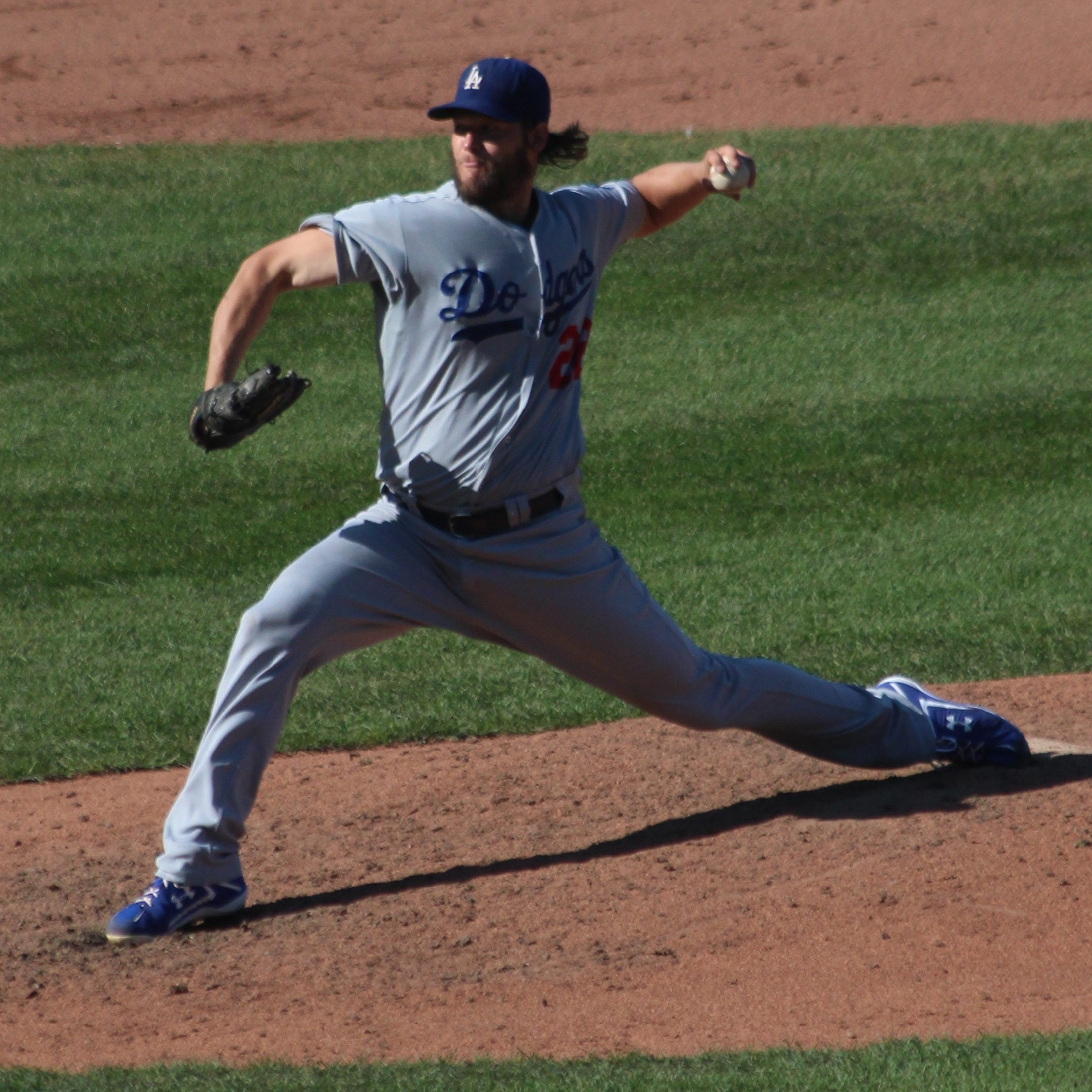
Clayton Kershaw picked up his 2,500th career strikeout against the Diamondbacks on September 3.

The Dodgers returned home for a six-game homestand, beginning with a three-game series with the Arizona Diamondbacks. In the series opener, Julio Urías allowed one earned run in six quality innings pitched while Chris Taylor drove in four runs in the team's 6–3 victory. In the second game of the series, the offense went silent for the majority of the game due to Zac Gallen pitching seven scoreless innings until the 9th inning when Mookie Betts hit a solo home run to tie the score at one. At the top of the tenth inning, Kenley Jansen gave up a bases-loaded walk to Christian Walker, but the Dodgers responded in the bottom of the tenth with a game-tying run on a throwing error by Junior Guerra and a walk-off single by Will Smith that scored Taylor to give the Dodgers a 3–2 victory. Clayton Kershaw pitched six scoreless innings, striking out eight batters (recording his 2,500 career strikeout on his third strikeout), as the Dodgers swept the Diamondbacks with a 5–1 victory. The Dodgers picked up their 30th win of the season on September 4 in the opener of a three-game weekend series with the Colorado Rockies. They scored five runs in the eighth inning to win 10–6. The Dodgers hit five home runs in the game as they matched the best 40 game start in franchise history (30–10, 1888, 1955, 1977). This was also the best 40-game start in the majors since the 116-win Mariners began 31–9 in 2001. In the second game of the series, the Rockies scored three runs in the ninth inning on an RBI single by Nolan Arenado and two-run double by Josh Fuentes to beat the Dodgers, 5–2. The Rockies won again the next day, 7–6, thanks to a two-run home run by Matt Kemp in the eighth inning, handing the Dodgers their first series loss of the season.

The Dodgers next traveled to Arizona to play the Diamondbacks in a three-game series at Chase Field. In the series opener, with the team trailing 6–2, the Dodgers rallied to score four runs in the top of the seventh inning to tie the game, scored four runs in the 10th inning, and withstood a rally from the Diamondbacks to win 10–9. Gavin Lux hit two home runs and drove in five runs in the game. In the second game of the series, the Dodgers scored two runs in the tenth inning to win 6–4. The Diamondbacks took the last game of the series, 5–2.

The Dodgers returned home to play the Houston Astros for a brief two game series. Kenley Jansen allowed five runs in the ninth inning as the Astros came from behind to beat the Dodgers, 7–5, on September 12. The Dodgers hit three home runs in the next game and bounced back with a 8–1 win to split the series.

The Dodgers embarked on their final road trip, starting with a crucial three-game series with the San Diego Padres at Petco Park. In the series opener, the Padres scored five runs in the seventh inning to beat the Dodgers 7–2. The Dodgers took the second game of the series with a 3–1 win behind seven quality innings from Tony Gonsolin. Justin Turner returned from the injured list, going three for four with an RBI. The Dodgers finished off the series with a 7–5 win. Dustin May pitched 5 1/3 innings in relief, giving up three runs (one earned), and striking out six batters. Will Smith drove in three runs and A.J. Pollock and Chris Taylor each hit home runs as the Dodgers became the first team to clinch a playoff berth for the 2020 MLB playoffs. The Dodgers headed up to Coors Field to play the Rockies for a four-game series. In the series opener, the Dodgers scored six runs in the seventh inning to overtake the Rockies 9–3. Corey Seager and Edwin Ríos each hit home runs while Seager and Smith each drove in two runs. The Dodgers hit three more home runs to rout the Rockies 15–6 in the second game of the series. The Dodgers won again in the third game of the series 6–1 behind Kershaw's seven quality innings and Chris Taylor's offensive performance, driving in three runs on a home run and a triple. Antonio Senzatela held the Dodgers to only one run in 6 1/3 innings and Josh Fuentes drove in three runs as the Rockies won 6–3 to avoid the sweep.

The Dodgers returned home to finish the regular season with a six-game homestand, beginning with a three-game series with the Oakland Athletics. In the series opener, the Dodgers got four home runs to propel the team to a 7–2 win and an eighth straight National League West division title. The Dodgers hit three more home runs in the next game, but Ramon Laureano hit a two-run go-ahead home run in the ninth to give the Athletics the win, 6–4. Seager hit a home run and drove in two runs as the Dodgers won the series finale 5–1. The Dodgers hosted the Los Angeles Angels of Anaheim for the final three games of the regular season. In the first game, the Dodgers hit five home runs, including two by Justin Turner and a go-ahead two-run home run by Will Smith, to outlast the Angels 9–5. In the second game of the series, the Dodgers withstood a rally from the Angels in the 9th inning to win 7–6 after Joc Pederson, who drove in three runs, hit a go-ahead two-run home run. In final game of the regular season, A.J. Pollock hit two home runs and drove in three runs as the Dodgers shut out the Angels 5–0 to complete the series sweep and finish with an MLB best record of 43–17.

== Postseason ==
=== Game log ===
2020 Postseason Game Log: (13–5)
National League Wild Card Series (2–0)

#	Date	Opponent	Score	Win	Loss	Save	Attendance	Record
1	September 30	Brewers	W 4–2	Urías (1–0)	Suter (0–1)	Jansen (1)	N/A	1–0
2	October 1	Brewers	W 3–0	Kershaw (1–0)	Woodruff (0–1)	Graterol (1)	N/A	2–0

National League Division Series (3–0)

#	Date	Opponent	Score	Win	Loss	Save	Attendance	Record
1	October 6	Padres	W 5–1	May (1–0)	Richards (0–1)	—	N/A	1–0
2	October 7	Padres	W 6–5	Kershaw (1–0)	Davies (0–1)	Kelly (1)	N/A	2–0
3	October 8	@ Padres	W 12–3	Urías (1–0)	Morejón (0–1)	—	N/A	3–0
all games played at Globe Life Field in Arlington, Texas

National League Championship Series (4–3)

#	Date	Opponent	Score	Win	Loss	Save	Attendance	Record
1	October 12	Braves	L 1–5	Smith (1–0)	Treinen (0–1)	—	10,700	0–1
2	October 13	Braves	L 7–8	Matzek (1–0)	Gonsolin (0–1)	Melancon (1)	10,624	0–2
3	October 14	@ Braves	W 15–3	Urías (1–0)	Wright (0–1)	—	10,664	1–2
4	October 15	@ Braves	L 2–10	Wilson (1–0)	Kershaw (0–1)	—	11,044	1–3
5	October 16	@ Braves	W 7–3	Treinen (1–1)	Smith (1–1)	—	11,119	2–3
6	October 17	Braves	W 3–1	Buehler (1–0)	Fried (0–1)	Jansen (1)	10,772	3–3
7	October 18	Braves	W 4–3	Urías (2–0)	Martin (0–1)	—	10,920	4–3
all games played at Globe Life Field in Arlington, Texas

World Series (4–2)

#	Date	Opponent	Score	Win	Loss	Save	Attendance	Record
1	October 20	Rays	W 8–3	Kershaw (1–0)	Glasnow (0–1)	—	11,388	1–0
2	October 21	Rays	L 4–6	Anderson (1–0)	Gonsolin (0–1)	Castillo (1)	11,472	1–1
3	October 23	@ Rays	W 6–2	Buehler (1–0)	Morton (0–1)	—	11,447	2–1
4	October 24	@ Rays	L 7–8	Curtiss (1–0)	Jansen (0–1)	—	11,441	2–2
5	October 25	@ Rays	W 4–2	Kershaw (2–0)	Glasnow (0–2)	Treinen (1)	11,437	3–2
6	October 27	Rays	W 3–1	González (1–0)	Anderson (1–1)	Urías (1)	11,437	4–2
all games played at Globe Life Field in Arlington, Texas

=== National League Wild Card Series ===
The Dodgers hosted the Milwaukee Brewers in the best of three first round series at Dodger Stadium. In the first game of the series, Corey Seager hit a home run and the pitching staff allowed only a two-run home run by Orlando Arcia as the Dodgers won 4–2. In the second game of the series, Clayton Kershaw pitched eight scoreless innings, recording 13 strikeouts, and the Dodgers scored three runs in the fifth inning to win 3–0 and sweep the series.

=== National League Division Series ===
All games of this series were played at Globe Life Field in Arlington, Texas, home field of the Texas Rangers. The Dodgers played the San Diego Padres. In the opener, the Dodger offense was silent until they scored a run in the fifth inning and four runs in the sixth inning to win 5–1. The Dodgers jumped out to a 4–1 lead in game two and withstood a late Padres rally to hold on to win 6–5. The Dodgers finished off a sweep of the series by routing the Padres 12–3. Will Smith became the first Dodger player ever to have five hits in a postseason game and Justin Turner moved past Steve Garvey for the most post-season hits in Dodger franchise history with 64.

=== National League Championship Series ===
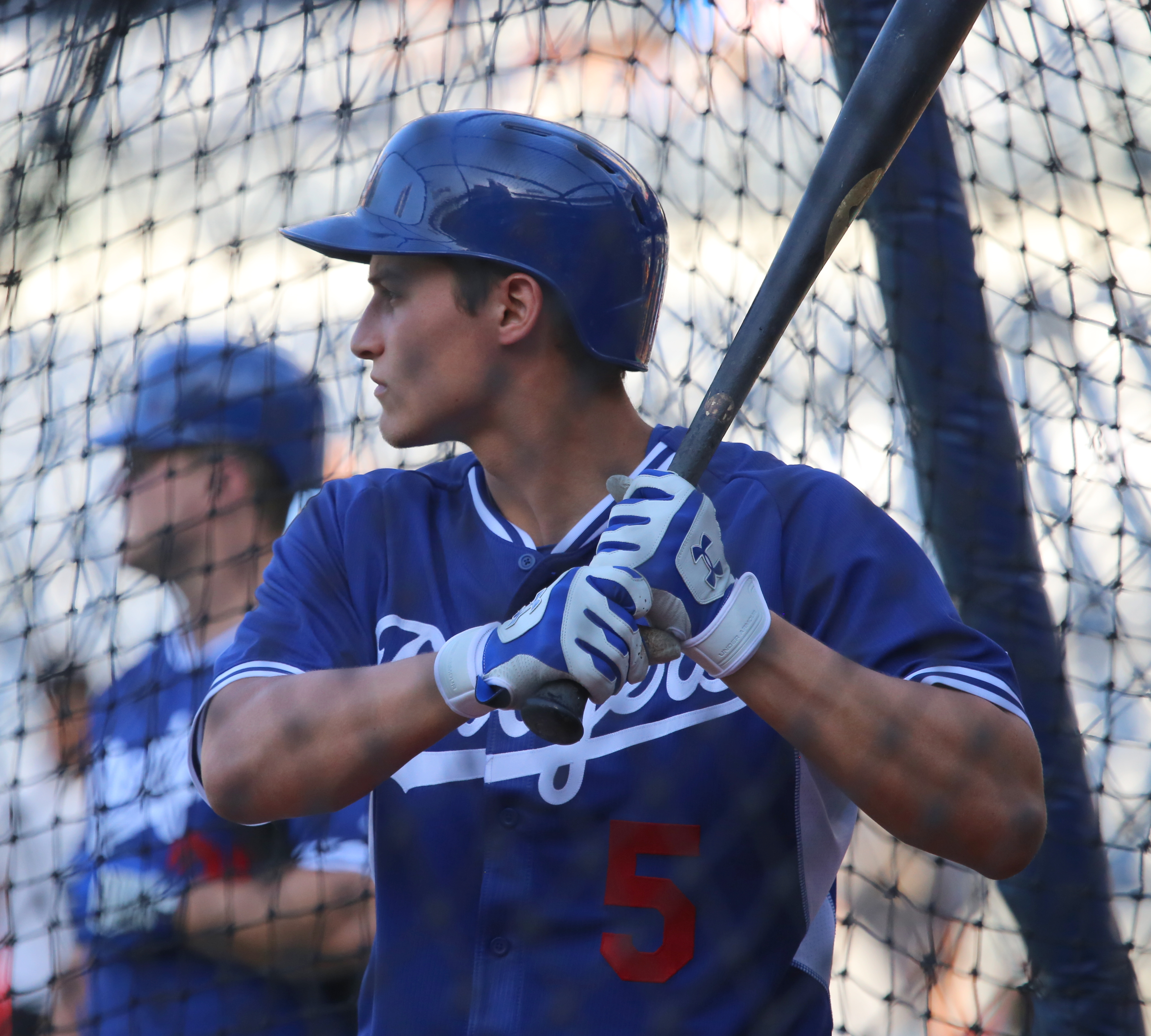
Corey Seager was the Most Valuable Player of both the NLCS and the World Series

The Dodgers faced the Atlanta Braves in the NLCS at Globe Life Field. For the first time this season a limited number of fans were allowed to attend this series. The opening game was a pitchers' duel between Walker Buehler and Max Fried, each of whom allowed only one run on a solo homer (Freddie Freeman for the Braves and Kiké Hernández for the Dodgers). However the Dodgers bullpen gave up the game in the ninth inning with Blake Treinen allowing the go-ahead homer to Austin Riley and then Ozzie Albies hit a two-run homer off Jake McGee to put the game out of reach as the Braves won, 5–1. In the second game, Freeman hit another homer and the Braves pulled out to a 6–0 lead after five innings as Ian Anderson shut the Dodgers down. However the Dodgers came back against the Braves bullpen, with Corey Seager hitting a three-run homer in the seventh and then they added four runs in the ninth thanks to a double by Seager, a homer by Max Muncy and a triple by Cody Bellinger. However the Braves held on to win 8–7 to take a two games to none lead in the series.

In Game 3, the Dodgers jumped on Braves starter Kyle Wright early, scoring 11 runs in the first inning with Edwin Ríos hitting a solo homer, Joc Pederson a three-run homer and Max Muncy a grand slam. The 11 runs in the first inning set an MLB record for the most runs ever scored in any inning of a postseason game. The Dodgers added on with a Cody Bellinger home run in the second followed by a Corey Seager homer in the third. Julio Urías allowed only one run in his five innings of work, with five strikeouts. They won the game 15–3. The 15 runs and five home runs by the Dodgers in the game both set new franchise records.

Clayton Kershaw, who was originally scheduled to start Game 2, started for the Dodgers in Game 4. For the Braves, rookie Bryse Wilson took the mound. Wilson was making only his eighth career start, and his first in the postseason. It was a pitchers' duel going into the sixth inning, with each starting pitcher giving up one solo home run (Wilson to Edwin Ríos and Kershaw to Marcell Ozuna). For Wilson, the home run was the only hit he allowed in six innings of work. In the bottom of then inning, the Braves broke the game open with six runs, and eleven batters coming to the plate. As a result of this 10–2 victory, the Braves took a 3–1 series lead. In Game 5, the Braves took a 2–0 lead after two innings off of Dustin May and the Braves' A. J. Minter struck out seven while allowing only one hit in three scoreless innings. The Dodgers got one back in the fourth on a solo homer by Seager and then took the lead in the sixth when Will Smith hit a three-run home run off of Braves reliever Will Smith. This was the first matchup between two players of the same name in playoff history. Mookie Betts drove in a run with a single in the seventh, followed by a two-run homer by Seager, his second of the night. The Dodgers held on to win 7–3.

In the sixth game of the series, the Dodgers got off to a strong start with three runs in the first off Max Fried, including solo homers by Seager and Justin Turner. With his homer, Seager set a new record for the most home runs in the NLCS with five and passed Iván Rodríguez (2003) for most RBI in a NLCS with his 11th. Buehler struck out six in six scoreless innings. Ronald Acuña Jr. doubled home Nick Markakis off of Blake Treinen to put the Braves on the board in the seventh inning. Fried did not allow any further runs as he went 6 2/3 innings, with eight hits and four walks allowed with five strikeouts. The Dodgers won 3–1 to force a winner take all seventh game. Ian Anderson started Game 7 for the Braves opposite Dustin May, on one day rest, for the Dodgers. May walked a couple in the first and gave up the first run of the game on a single to Marcell Ozuna. Tony Gonsolin came in to pitch in the second and allowed a solo homer to Dansby Swanson. The Dodgers tied up the game in the third on a two-run single by Will Smith. In the fourth, Gonsolin walked the first two batters and then allowed an RBI single to Austin Riley to put the Braves back on top. Kiké Hernández homered off A. J. Minter in the sixth to tie it back up. Cody Bellinger gave the Dodgers their first lead of the game on a solo homer off Chris Martin in the seventh inning. Julio Urías pitched the last three innings to pick up the win as the Dodgers held on for the 4–3 victory and became just the fourteenth team in postseason history to come back from a 3–1 series deficit.

=== World Series ===
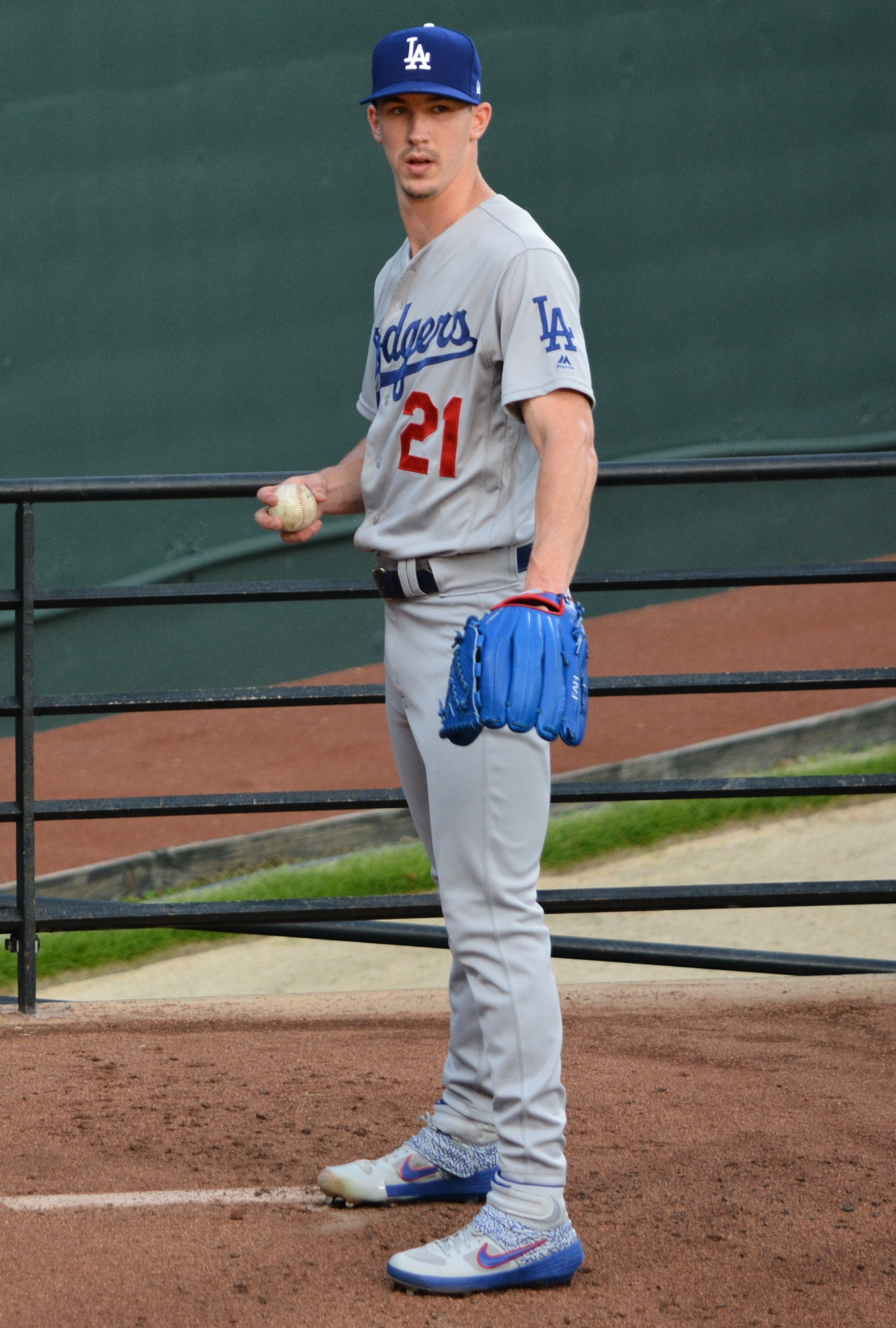
Game 3 winning pitcher Walker Buehler

The Dodgers played the Tampa Bay Rays in the World Series, the Dodgers’ third World Series appearance in four seasons. Clayton Kershaw allowed only one run (a solo homer by Kevin Kiermaier) on two hits in six innings, while striking out eight in the opener, his 11th Game 1 start in the postseason, tying Greg Maddux for second most all-time. Cody Bellinger and Mookie Betts both homered and the Dodgers started off the series with an 8–3 win. The Dodgers hit three home runs in the second game, but lost to the Rays 6–4 to even the series.

In Game 3, Walker Buehler pitched six innings and allowed one run on three hits and one walk with 10 strikeouts, becoming the third youngest pitcher with 10 or more strikeouts and three or fewer hits in a World Series game, behind only Ed Walsh in 1906 and Josh Beckett in 2003. Austin Barnes homered and drove in another run on a safety squeeze and Justin Turner also homered as the Dodgers won 6–2. Game 4 was a back and forth game. The Dodgers led from the beginning after Turner hit another fourth inning home run but the Rays went ahead on a three-run homer by Brandon Lowe in the sixth, only for the Dodgers to regain the lead in the next inning on a two-run single by Joc Pederson. The Rays won the game in walk-off fashion in the ninth after a single by Brett Phillips drove in the tying run and then a couple of fielding miscues let the winning run cross the plate to tie the series. The Dodgers went back ahead with a 4–2 win in Game 5 thanks to Clayton Kershaw, whose strikeout of Kevin Kiermaier in the bottom of the fifth inning moved him past Justin Verlander for the record of most career postseason strikeouts. Kershaw finished with 5 2/3 innings, two runs allowed on five hits and two walks with six strikeouts.

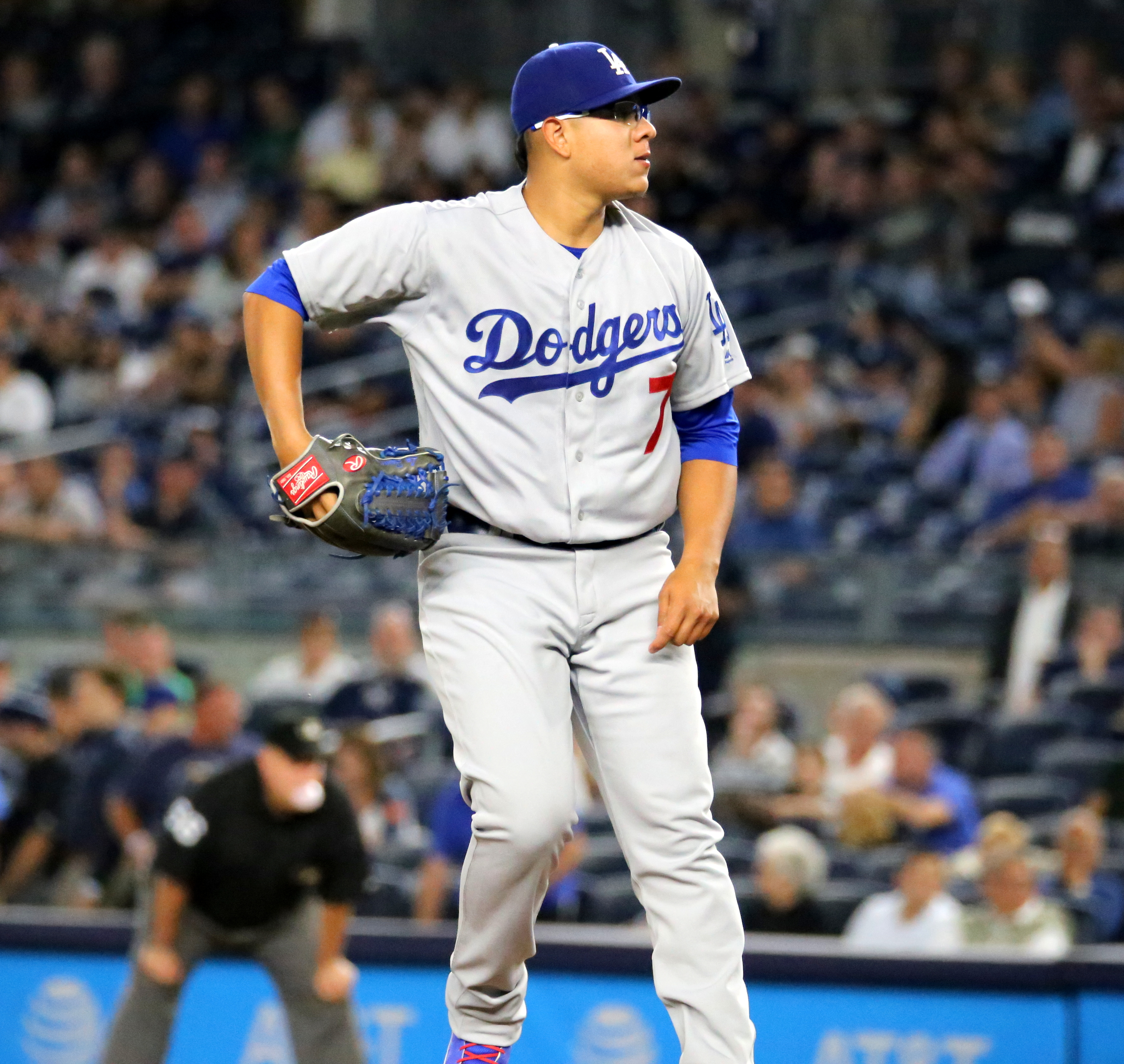
Julio Urías closed out the final games of both the NLCS and the World Series for the Dodgers

Facing elimination, the Rays started Blake Snell, who had a no decision Game 2. The Dodgers countered with Tony Gonsolin, who allowed one run as an opener in Game 2 and took the loss. The Rays scored first in this game with a solo home run by Randy Arozarena, his tenth during the postseason and third of the World Series. Gonsolin faced 10 batters in his second start, lasting 1 2/3 innings while allowing Arozarena's home run plus two hits and two walks. Snell was removed from the game with one out in the sixth inning after allowing a hit to Austin Barnes, who later scored on a wild pitch by Nick Anderson. The Dodgers took the lead on a fielder's choice grounder by Corey Seager that scored Mookie Betts. Snell allowed only the one earned run in 5 1/3 innings on two hits while striking out nine and walking none. The Dodgers added another run in the eighth inning when Betts hit a home run off Pete Fairbanks. Julio Urías worked the last 2 1/3 innings for the save as the Dodgers won their seventh World Series championship and their first since 1988. With the Los Angeles Lakers winning the NBA Finals on October 11, it was the first time since 1988 that both the Lakers and Dodgers won championships in the same year.

=== Postseason rosters ===
Playoff rosters
National League Wild Card Series

Pitchers: 7 Julio Urías 17 Joe Kelly 21 Walker Buehler 22 Clayton Kershaw 41 Jake McGee 46 Tony Gonsolin 48 Brusdar Graterol 49 Blake Treinen 52 Pedro Báez 56 Adam Kolarek 74 Kenley Jansen 81 Victor González 85 Dustin May
Catchers: 15 Austin Barnes 16 Will Smith 25 Keibert Ruiz
Infielders: 3 Chris Taylor 5 Corey Seager 10 Justin Turner 13 Max Muncy 14 Enrique Hernández 43 Edwin Ríos 45 Matt Beaty Outfielders: 11 A. J. Pollock 27 Terrance Gore 31 Joc Pederson 35 Cody Bellinger 50 Mookie Betts

National League Division Series

Pitchers: 7 Julio Urías 17 Joe Kelly 21 Walker Buehler 22 Clayton Kershaw 41 Jake McGee 46 Tony Gonsolin 49 Blake Treinen 48 Brusdar Graterol 51 Dylan Floro 52 Pedro Báez 56 Adam Kolarek 74 Kenley Jansen 81 Victor González 85 Dustin May
Catchers: 15 Austin Barnes 16 Will Smith
Infielders: 5 Corey Seager 9 Gavin Lux 10 Justin Turner 13 Max Muncy 14 Enrique Hernández 45 Matt Beaty Outfielders: 3 Chris Taylor 11 A. J. Pollock 27 Terrance Gore 31 Joc Pederson 35 Cody Bellinger 50 Mookie Betts

National League Championship Series

Pitchers: 7 Julio Urías 17 Joe Kelly 21 Walker Buehler 22 Clayton Kershaw 41 Jake McGee 46 Tony Gonsolin 48 Brusdar Graterol 49 Blake Treinen 51 Dylan Floro 52 Pedro Báez 56 Adam Kolarek 57 Alex Wood 74 Kenley Jansen 81 Victor González 85 Dustin May
Catchers: 15 Austin Barnes 16 Will Smith
Infielders: 5 Corey Seager 10 Justin Turner 13 Max Muncy 14 Enrique Hernández 43 Edwin Ríos 45 Matt Beaty Outfielders: 3 Chris Taylor 11 A. J. Pollock 31 Joc Pederson 35 Cody Bellinger 50 Mookie Betts

World Series

Pitchers: 7 Julio Urías 17 Joe Kelly 21 Walker Buehler 22 Clayton Kershaw 41 Jake McGee 46 Tony Gonsolin 48 Brusdar Graterol 49 Blake Treinen 51 Dylan Floro 52 Pedro Báez 56 Adam Kolarek 57 Alex Wood 74 Kenley Jansen 81 Victor González 85 Dustin May
Catchers: 15 Austin Barnes 16 Will Smith
Infielders: 5 Corey Seager 10 Justin Turner 13 Max Muncy 14 Enrique Hernández 43 Edwin Ríos 45 Matt Beaty Outfielders: 3 Chris Taylor 11 A. J. Pollock 31 Joc Pederson 35 Cody Bellinger 50 Mookie Betts

== Roster ==
2020 Los Angeles Dodgers
Roster
Pitchers: 75 Scott Alexander; 52 Pedro Báez; 21 Walker Buehler; 64 Caleb Ferguson; 51 Dylan Floro; 46 Tony Gonsolin; 81 Victor González; 48 Brusdar Graterol; 74 Kenley Jansen; 17 Joe Kelly; 22 Clayton Kershaw; 56 Adam Kolarek; 85 Dustin May; 41 Jake McGee; 77 Dennis Santana; 76 Josh Sborz; 68 Ross Stripling; 49 Blake Treinen; 7 Julio Urías; 66 Mitch White; 57 Alex Wood	Catchers: 15 Austin Barnes; 25 Keibert Ruiz; 16 Will Smith; Infielders: 45 Matt Beaty; 14 Enrique Hernández; 9 Gavin Lux; 13 Max Muncy; 43 Edwin Ríos; 5 Corey Seager; 3 Chris Taylor; 10 Justin Turner	Outfielders: 35 Cody Bellinger; 50 Mookie Betts; 27 Terrance Gore; 8 Zach McKinstry; 31 Joc Pederson; 11 A. J. Pollock	Manager: 30 Dave Roberts; Coaches: 54 Josh Bard (bullpen); 65 Aaron Bates (assistant hitting); 73 Brant Brown (hitting); 82 Steve Cilladi (bullpen catcher); 91 Dino Ebel (third base); 88 Bob Geren (bench); 0 Danny Lehmann (game planning & communication); 92 George Lombard (first base); 87 Connor McGuinness (assistant pitching); 99 Mark Prior (pitching); 72 Robert Van Scoyoc (hitting)

== Statistics ==
=== Batting ===
List does not include pitchers. Stats in bold are the team leaders.

Note: G = Games played; AB = At bats; R = Runs; H = Hits; 2B = Doubles; 3B = Triples; HR = Home runs; RBI = Runs batted in; BB = Walks; SO = Strikeouts; SB = Stolen bases; AVG = Batting average; OBP = On base percentage; SLG = Slugging; OPS = On Base + Slugging

Player	G	AB	R	H	2B	3B	HR	RBI	BB	SO	SB	AVG	OBP	SLG	OPS
Mookie Betts	55	**219**	**47**	64	9	1	**16**	39	24	38	**10**	.292	.366	.562	.928
Cody Bellinger	56	213	33	51	10	0	12	30	30	42	6	.239	.333	.455	.789
Corey Seager	52	212	38	**65**	**12**	1	15	**41**	17	37	1	**.307**	.358	.585	.943
Max Muncy	**58**	203	36	39	4	0	12	27	**39**	**60**	1	.192	.331	.389	.720
A. J. Pollock	55	196	30	54	9	0	**16**	34	12	45	2	.276	.314	.566	.881
Chris Taylor	56	185	30	50	10	**2**	8	32	26	55	3	.270	.366	.476	.842
Justin Turner	42	150	26	46	9	1	4	23	18	26	1	**.307**	.400	.460	.860
Kiké Hernández	48	139	20	32	8	1	5	20	6	31	0	.230	.270	.410	.680
Joc Pederson	43	121	21	23	4	0	7	16	11	34	1	.190	.285	.297	.681
Will Smith	37	114	23	33	9	0	8	25	20	22	0	.289	**.401**	.579	**.980**
Austin Barnes	29	86	14	21	3	0	1	9	13	24	3	.244	.353	.314	.667
Edwin Ríos	32	76	13	19	6	0	8	17	4	18	0	.250	.301	**.645**	.946
Gavin Lux	19	63	8	11	2	0	3	8	6	19	1	.175	.246	.349	.596
Matt Beaty	21	50	8	11	1	0	2	5	2	14	0	.220	.278	.360	.638
Keibert Ruiz	2	8	1	2	0	0	1	1	0	3	0	.250	.250	.625	.875
Zach McKinstry	4	7	1	2	1	0	0	0	0	3	0	.286	.286	.429	.714
Terrance Gore	2	0	0	0	0	0	0	0	0	0	0	.000	.000	.000	.000
**Team totals**	**60**	**2042**	**349**	**523**	**97**	**6**	**118**	**327**	**228**	**471**	**29**	**.256**	**.338**	**.483**	**.821**

=== Pitching ===
Stats in bold are the team leaders.

Note: W = Wins; L = Losses; ERA = Earned run average; G = Games pitched; GS = Games started; SV = Saves; IP = Innings pitched; R = Runs allowed; ER = Earned runs allowed; BB = Walks allowed; K = Strikeouts

Player	W	L	ERA	G	GS	SV	IP	H	R	ER	BB	K
Clayton Kershaw	**6**	2	**2.16**	10	**10**	0	**58.1**	41	18	14	8	**62**
Dustin May	3	1	2.57	12	**10**	0	56.0	**45**	18	16	16	44
Julio Urías	3	0	3.27	11	**10**	0	55.0	**45**	20	20	**18**	45
Tony Gonsolin	2	2	2.31	9	8	0	46.2	32	13	12	7	46
Walker Buehler	1	0	3.44	8	8	0	36.2	24	18	14	11	42
Ross Stripling	3	1	5.61	7	7	0	33.2	38	**26**	**21**	11	27
Blake Treinen	3	**3**	3.86	**27**	0	1	25.2	23	15	11	8	22
Dylan Floro	3	0	2.59	25	0	0	24.1	23	7	7	4	19
Kenley Jansen	3	1	3.33	**27**	0	**11**	24.1	19	11	9	9	33
Brusdar Graterol	1	2	3.09	23	2	0	23.1	18	9	8	3	13
Victor González	3	0	1.33	15	1	0	20.1	13	3	3	2	23
Jake McGee	3	1	2.66	24	0	0	20.1	14	6	6	3	33
Adam Kolarek	3	0	0.95	20	0	1	19.0	11	2	2	4	13
Caleb Ferguson	2	1	2.89	21	1	0	18.2	16	7	6	3	27
Pedro Báez	0	0	3.18	18	0	2	17.0	10	8	6	7	13
Dennis Santana	1	2	5.29	12	0	0	17.0	15	11	10	7	18
Alex Wood	0	1	6.39	9	2	0	12.2	17	11	9	6	15
Scott Alexander	2	0	2.92	13	0	0	12.1	9	6	4	9	9
Joe Kelly	0	0	1.80	12	1	0	10.0	8	3	2	7	9
Josh Sborz	0	0	2.08	4	0	0	4.1	2	1	1	1	2
Mitch White	1	0	0.00	2	0	0	3.0	1	0	0	1	2
**Team totals**	**43**	**17**	**3.02**	**60**	**60**	**15**	**538.2**	**424**	**213**	**181**	**145**	**517**

== Awards and honors ==
Recipient	Award	Date awarded	Ref.
Corey Seager	National League Championship Series MVP	October 18, 2020	
Mookie Betts	Baseball America All-MLB Team	October 23, 2020	
Tony Gonsolin	Baseball America Rookie of the Year Award	October 26, 2020	
Corey Seager	World Series Most Valuable Player Award	October 27, 2020	
Mookie Betts	Fielding Bible Award (Right Field)	October 29, 2020	
Kiké Hernández	Fielding Bible Award (Multi Positional)	October 29, 2020	
Mookie Betts	Gold Glove Award (Right Field)	November 3, 2020	
Mookie Betts	Silver Slugger Award (Right Field)	November 5, 2020	
Andrew Friedman	Major League Baseball Executive of the Year Award	November 11, 2020	
Andrew Friedman	Baseball America's Major League Baseball Executive of the Year	November 30, 2020	
Los Angeles Dodgers	Baseball America's Major League Organization of the Year	November 30, 2020	
Mookie Betts	All-MLB Team	December 9, 2020	
Clayton Kershaw	All-MLB Team (Second Team)	December 9, 2020	
Corey Seager	All-MLB Team (Second Team)	December 9, 2020	

== Transactions ==
=== July ===
- On July 22, selected the contract of OF Terrance Gore from Dodgers alternate training site.
- On July 23, placed LHP Clayton Kershaw on the 10-day injured list with back stiffness and recalled RHP Dustin May from the alternate training site.
- On July 28, placed LHP Alex Wood on the 10-day injured list with left shoulder inflammation and recalled RHP Josh Sborz from the alternate training site.
- On July 30, designated OF Terrance Gore for assignment and recalled LHP Victor González from the alternate training site.
- On July 31, optioned RHP Josh Sborz to the alternate training site and recalled RHP Tony Gonsolin from the alternate training site.

=== August ===
- On August 1, optioned RHP Tony Gonsolin to the alternate training site and recalled RHP Mitch White from the alternate training site.
- On August 2, activated LHP Clayton Kershaw from the 10-day injured list and optioned RHP Mitch White to the alternate training site.
- On August 5, optioned LHP Victor González to the alternate training site and recalled IF Zach McKinstry from the alternate training site.
- On August 6, optioned LHP Adam Kolarek and IF Zach McKinstry to the alternate training site.
- On August 9, placed RHP Joe Kelly on the 10-day injured list with right shoulder inflammation and recalled LHP Adam Kolarek from the alternate training site.
- On August 12, recalled RHP Tony Gonsolin from the alternate training site and optioned LHP Adam Kolarek to the alternate training site.
- On August 15, placed C Will Smith on the 10-day injured list with neck inflammation and recalled C Keibert Ruiz from the alternate training site.
- On August 17, placed IF Edwin Ríos on the 10-day injured list with a left hamstring strain and recalled LHP Adam Kolarek from the alternate training site.
- On August 20, placed RHP Pedro Báez on the 10-day injured list with a right groin strain and recalled RHP Josh Sborz from the alternate training site.
- On August 23, activated C Will Smith from the 10-day injured list and optioned C Keibert Ruiz to the alternate training site.
- On August 27, placed RHP Walker Buehler on the 10-day injured list with a blister on his right hand and recalled RHP Mitch White from the alternate training site. Recalled IF Gavin Lux from the alternate training site as the 29th man for a doubleheader and then optioned him back following the game.
- On August 29, optioned RHP Mitch White to the alternate training site and recalled IF Gavin Lux from the alternate training site.
- On August 30, optioned RHP Josh Sborz to the alternate training site and recalled RHP Tony Gonsolin from the alternate training site.
- On August 31, traded RHP Ross Stripling to the Toronto Blue Jays in exchange for Kendall Williams and a player to be named later.

=== September ===
- On September 1, activated LHP Alex Wood and IF Edwin Ríos from the 10-day injured list and placed 3B Justin Turner on the 10-day injured list with a strained left hamstring.
- On September 2, activated RHP Walker Buehler from the 10-day injured list and optioned LHP Scott Alexander to the alternate training site.
- On September 8, placed OF Joc Pederson on the paternity list and recalled RHP Josh Sborz from the alternate training site.
- On September 10, placed RHP Walker Buehler on the 10-day injured list with a right finger blister and activated RHP Joe Kelly from the 10-day injured list.
- On September 11, activated OF Joc Pederson from the paternity list and optioned IF/OF Matt Beaty to the alternate training site.
- On September 12, activated RHP Pedro Báez from the 10-day injured list and optioned RHP Dennis Santana to the alternate training site.
- On September 15, activated 3B Justin Turner from the 10-day injured list and optioned RHP Josh Sborz to the alternate training site.
- On September 16, placed LHP Caleb Ferguson on the 10-day injured list with a left elbow injury and OF Joc Pederson on the family emergency medical leave list, recalled RHP Josh Sborz and IF Zach McKinstry from the alternate training site.
- On September 18, recalled RHP Mitch White from the alternate training site and optioned RHP Josh Sborz to the alternate training site.
- On September 21, activated OF Joc Pederson from the family medical emergency list and optioned IF Zach McKinstry to the alternate training site.
- On September 24, activated RHP Walker Buehler from the 10-day injured list and optioned RHP Mitch White to the alternate training site.

== Farm system ==
As a result of the ongoing pandemic, Minor League Baseball did not operate a season at any level this year. They officially announced the cancellation on June 30.

Level	Team	League	Manager	W	L	Position
AAA	Oklahoma City Dodgers	Pacific Coast League	Travis Barbary			Season Cancelled
AA	Tulsa Drillers	Texas League	Scott Hennessey			Season Cancelled
High A	Rancho Cucamonga Quakes	California League	Austin Chubb			Season Cancelled
A	Great Lakes Loons	Midwest League	John Shoemaker			Season Cancelled
Adv. Rookie	Ogden Raptors	Pioneer League	Anthony Cappuccilli			Season Cancelled
Rookie	Arizona League Dodgers 1	Arizona League	Jair Fernandez			Season Cancelled
Rookie	Arizona League Dodgers 2	Arizona League	Danny Dorn			Season Cancelled
Foreign Rookie	DSL Dodgers 1	Dominican Summer League	Cordell Hipolito			Season Cancelled
Foreign Rookie	DSL Dodgers 2	Dominican Summer League	Fumi Ishibashi			Season Cancelled

The following minor leaguers were part of the Dodgers alternate site training camp:

- Pitchers

Clayton Beeter
Gerardo Carrillo
Josiah Gray
Michael Grove
Andre Jackson
Marshall Kasowski
Landon Knack
Bobby Miller
Ryan Pepiot
Edubray Ramos
Kendall Williams

- Catchers

Diego Cartaya

- Infielders

Michael Busch
Omar Estevez
Kody Hoese
Devin Mann

- Outfielders

Anthony García
DJ Peters
Luke Raley
Zach Reks
Cody Thomas
Jake Vogel

== Major League Baseball draft ==
The 2020 Draft was shortened to only five rounds as a result of the ongoing COVID-19 pandemic. The Dodgers had six picks in the draft, including a pick in "Competitive Balance Round B" between the second and third rounds. The Dodgers acquired that pick from the Minnesota Twins in the Kenta Maeda trade. The Dodgers first round pick was right-handed pitcher Bobby Miller from the University of Louisville. As of the 2025 season, four of the six members of this draft class have played in the majors.

2020 draft picks

Round	Name	Position	School	Signed	Career span	Highest level
1	Bobby Miller	RHP	University of Louisville	Yes	2021–present	MLB
2	Landon Knack	RHP	East Tennessee State	Yes	2021–present	MLB
CB-B	Clayton Beeter	RHP	Texas Tech University	Yes	2021–present	MLB
3	Jake Vogel	OF	Huntington Beach High School	Yes	2021–2024	A+
4	Carson Taylor	C	Virginia Tech	Yes	2021–present	AAA
5	Gavin Stone	RHP	Central Arkansas University	Yes	2021–present	MLB
