= Pedro Báez =

Dominican baseball player (born 1988)

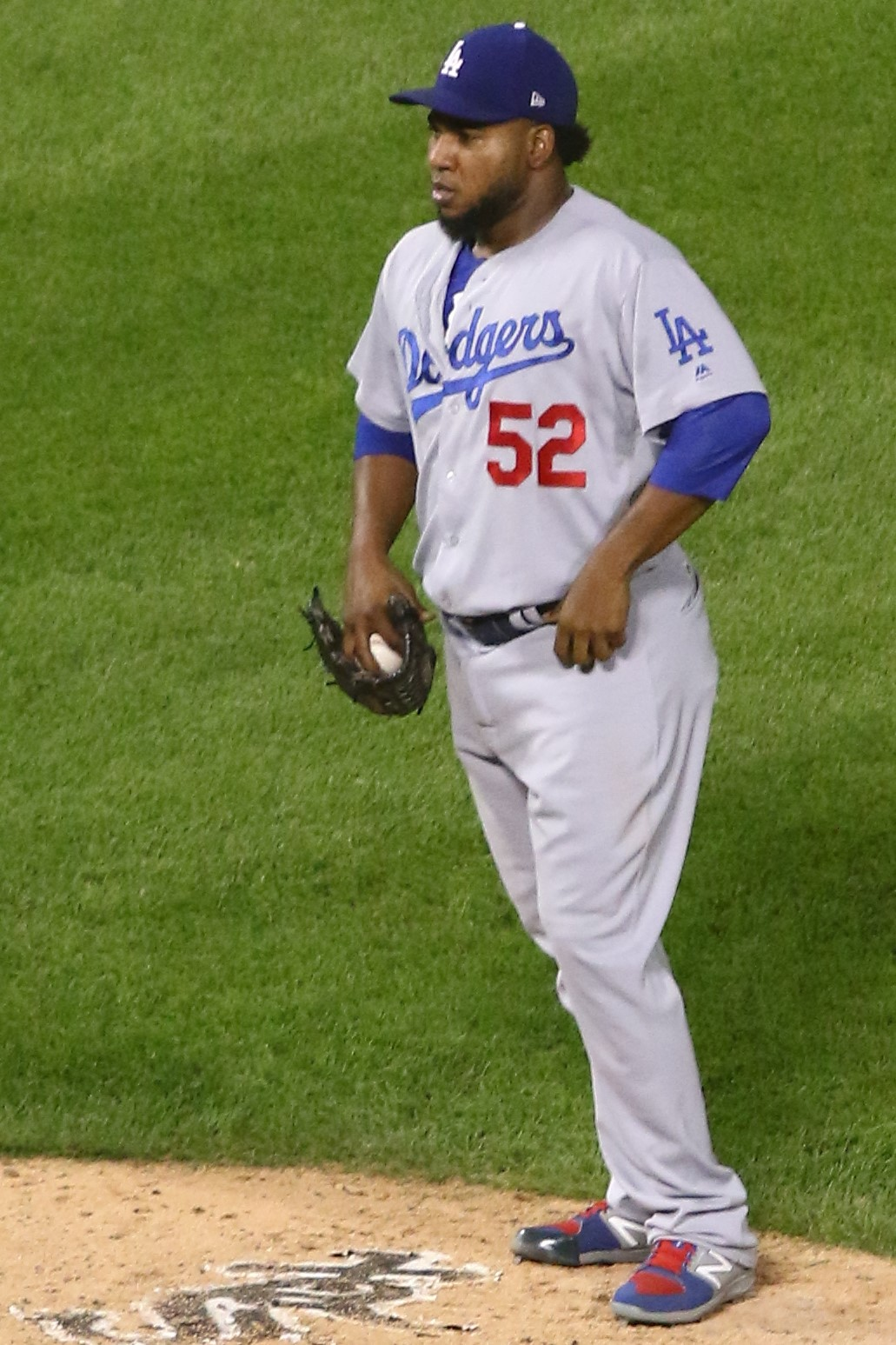
- Báez with the Los Angeles Dodgers in 2017
- Pitcher
- Born: March 11, 1988 (age 38); Baní, Dominican Republic
- Batted: Right Threw: Right

MLB debut
- May 5, 2014, for the Los Angeles Dodgers

Last MLB appearance
- April 19, 2022, for the Houston Astros

MLB statistics
- Win–loss record: 21–15
- Earned run average: 3.08
- Strikeouts: 376
- Stats at Baseball Reference

Teams
- Los Angeles Dodgers (2014–2020); Houston Astros (2021–2022)

Career highlights and awards
- World Series champion (2020)

Pedro Alberys Báez (born March 11, 1988) is a Dominican former professional baseball pitcher. He played in Major League Baseball (MLB) for the Los Angeles Dodgers and Houston Astros. Signed as an international free agent in 2007, Báez made his MLB debut with the Dodgers in 2014, and, in 2020, was a member of the Dodgers' World Series championship club.

From Baní, Dominican Republic, the Dodgers originally signed Báez as a third baseman. He appeared in two All-Star Futures Games while receiving recognition by Baseball America as having the best infield arm and as the best defensive third baseman in the Dodgers' minor league system. Following the 2012 season, the club converted him to pitching. He appeared in six playoffs for Los Angeles.

After reaching free agency following the 2020 season, Báez signed with the Astros. In early 2022, he rejoined the Dodgers organization.

== Professional career ==
=== Minor leagues: 2007–2013 ===
==== As a third baseman ====
Báez signed with the Los Angeles Dodgers as a non-drafted free agent out of Bani, Dominican Republic by assistant general manager Logan White on January 22, 2007, and began his career as a third baseman that season with the Gulf Coast Dodgers. In 53 games, he hit .274/.341/.408, leading the league with five sacrifice flies. His 39 RBIs ranked second in the Gulf Coast League, his 14 doubles ranked sixth, and his 35 runs ranked eighth, and he was rated as having the best infield arm in the Dodgers organization.

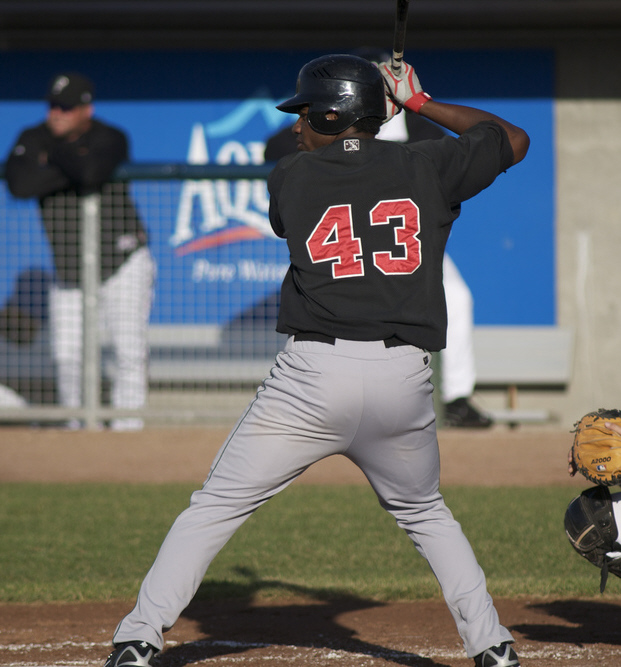
Baez as a hitter with the Great Lakes Loons in 2008.

He split the 2008 season between the Ogden Raptors of the Pioneer Baseball League and the Great Lakes Loons of the Midwest League, hitting .229/.285/.398 in 120 games with 13 home runs and 66 RBIs. He played in 79 games in 2009 for the Inland Empire 66ers of the California League, hitting .286/.326/.445 with 10 homers and 61 RBIs. He was again cited by Baseball America as having the best infield arm in the Dodgers system and represented the World team in the 2009 All-Star Futures Game.

In 2010 Báez spent most of the season with the 66ers, but finished the year with the Chattanooga Lookouts of the Class AA Southern League. He played in 84 games, hitting .263/.313/.348 with six homers and 45 RBIs. He was selected to the World team at the All-Star Futures Game for a second straight season. Báez appeared in 32 games early in 2011 with the Lookouts, hitting only .210/.278/.381 in 105 at bats before spending most of the season on the disabled list.

In 2012 with the Lookouts, he was selected to the mid-season Southern League all-star team. Between the Lookouts and the Rancho Cucamonga Quakes, he played in 128 games and hit .221/.306/.374 with 11 homers and 59 RBIs. He was rated by Baseball America as being the Dodgers best minor league defensive infielder and having the best infield arm.

==== As a pitcher ====
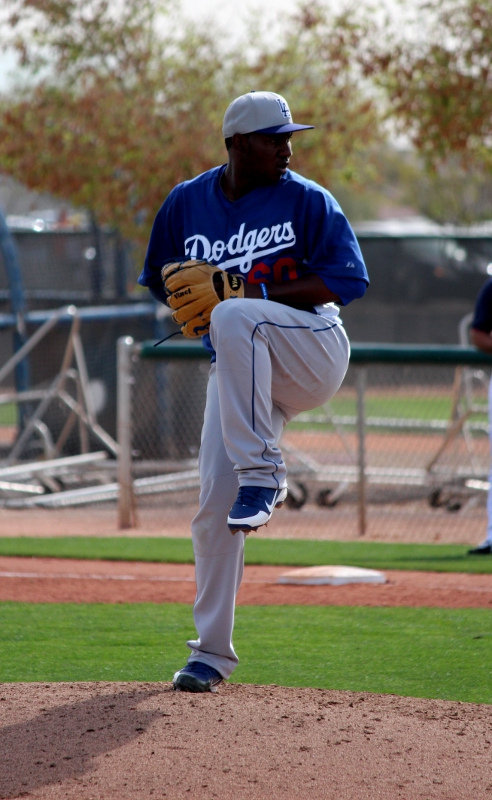
Báez in spring training with the 2013 Los Angeles Dodgers

After the 2012 season, the Dodgers decided that they would attempt to convert Báez from third base and make him a pitcher. To that point he had played 484 minor league games at third base, one at shortstop, and one at first base. The Dodgers added Báez to the 40-man roster on November 20, 2013. He was assigned, as a pitcher, to the Quakes to start the 2013 season, but was promoted to Chattanooga at mid-season. Between the two levels, he appeared in 48 games out of the bullpen and was 3–3 with two saves and a 3.88 ERA in 58 innings. He then pitched 4.1 innings for the Glendale Desert Dogs of the Arizona Fall League after the season.

=== Los Angeles Dodgers ===
Báez began the 2014 season with the Lookouts, and was called up to the Majors for the first time on May 5. He made his MLB debut later that night against the Washington Nationals. He allowed a single and a two-run homer to his first two batters before retiring the next three players in his one inning of work. He returned to the minors following the game. After another one game appearance for the Dodgers in July, he joined the bullpen in August and remained there the rest of the season. In 20 appearances, he had an ERA of 2.63, struck out 18 and walked 5. In 2015, he pitched in 52 games with a 3.35 ERA. In the minors, with Chattanooga and the Triple-A Albuquerque Isotopes, he pitched in 40 games with a 3.86 ERA and 12 saves. He made the roster for the 2014 National League Division Series (NLDS) against the St. Louis Cardinals, and allowed two runs in 2 1/3 innings. The runs he allowed were on a two-run homer by Matt Holliday in game one.

Báez made the 2015 Dodgers opening day roster. He went 4–2 with a 3.35 ERA in 51 innings over 52 games with 60 strikeouts against only 11 walks. His first major league win came when he threw 1 1/3 scoreless innings of relief against the Colorado Rockies on May 10. The following week Báez was placed on the DL with a right pectoral strain and completed 3 scoreless innings in three rehab appearances in Triple-A Oklahoma City before returning to the big league club. In game three of the 2015 NLDS, all three of the batters he faced reached base, two by walk, and he was charged with three runs without getting an out.

In 2016 Báez ranked second among Dodger relievers with career-high marks in games (73) and innings (74). He went 3–2 with a 3.04 ERA and 83 strikeouts and limited opponents to a .195 batting average. He also allowed 11 home runs and walked 22 batters. He pitched 3 2/3 scoreless innings over four games against the Nationals in the 2016 NLDS but allowed six runs in 3 1/3 innings in three games of the 2016 National League Championship Series against the Chicago Cubs. The slow pace of play employed by Báez during the 2016 postseason drew criticism from reporters and is frequently referenced in support of MLB Commissioner Rob Manfred's quest to speed up baseball with "pace of play" initiatives.

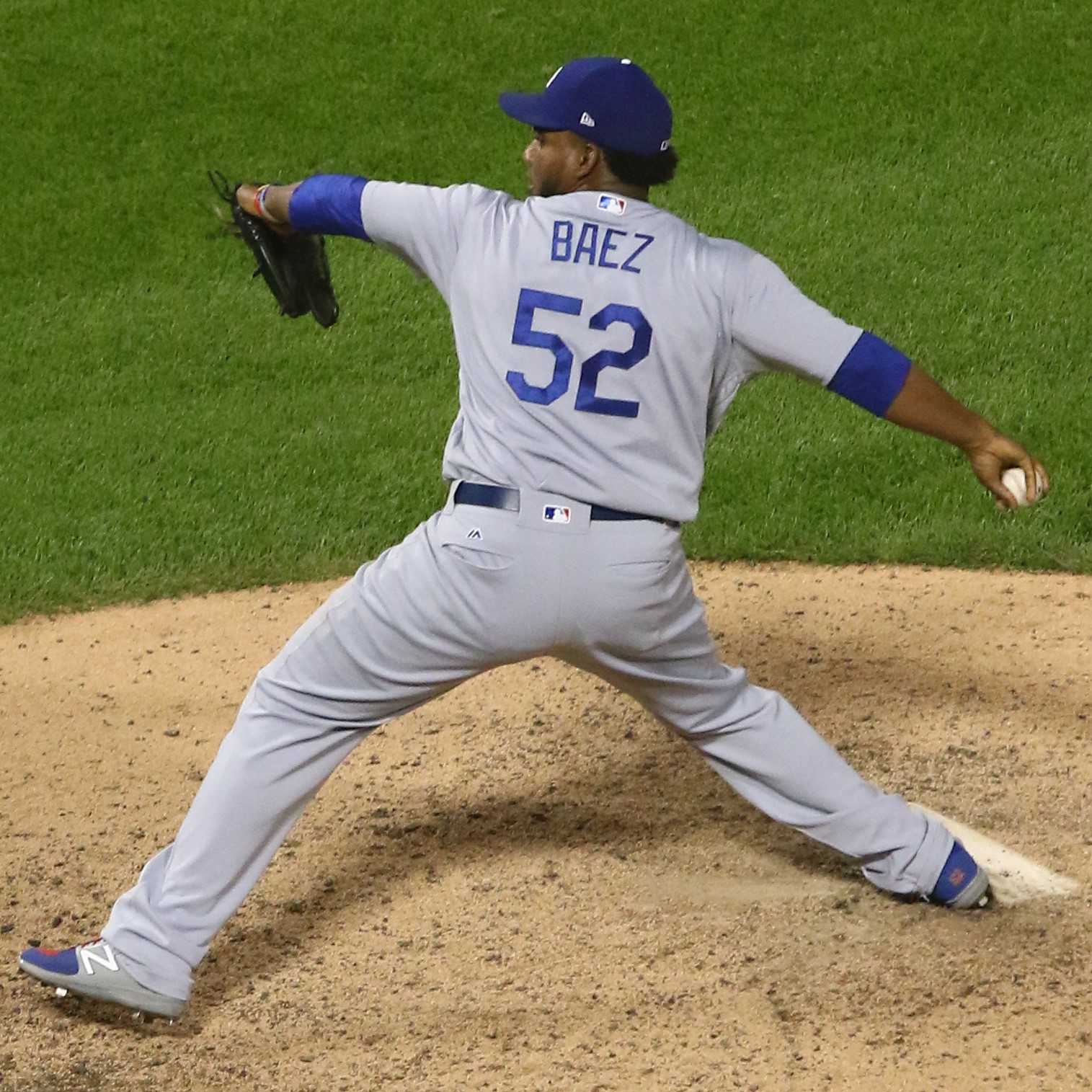
Báez with the 2017 Los Angeles Dodgers

Báez was hit with a ball while throwing batting practice early in spring training in 2017, which caused him to miss most of training camp and begin the season on the disabled list. He rejoined the team on April 14. In a team-leading 66 relief appearances for the 2017 Dodgers he was 3–6 with a 2.95 ERA and 64 strikeouts. He struggled with his command in September, giving up five home runs over a short span and finding himself booed by the home fans. Báez was on the Dodgers roster for the 2017 NLDS but did not appear in a game and was removed from the playoff roster for subsequent series. After receiving written warnings from Commissioner Rob Manfred, Báez decreased his average time between pitches and Jeremy Jeffress took over the distinction of being the slowest relief pitcher in 2017. Báez agreed to terms with the Dodgers on a $1.5 million contract for 2018 to avoid salary arbitration.

In his fifth major league season in 2018 Báez was 4–3 and posted a 2.88 ERA in 55 relief appearances. He struck out 62 batters in 56 1/3 innings of work, and held opposing batters to a .220 average. During the 2018 postseason, Báez went 1–0 with a 1.59 ERA in 11 1/3 innings, striking out 14 batters against 5 walks.

Báez finished the 2019 season 7–2 with one save (the first in his career) and a 3.10 ERA, and led the Dodgers in games pitched with 71, in which he pitched 69.2 innings. Báez was awarded a $4 million contract for 2020 after going to an arbitration hearing with the Dodgers.

In the pandemic-shortened 2020 season, Báez pitched 17 innings in 18 games with six earned runs allowed for a 3.18 ERA, and saved two games. Báez pitched one scoreless inning in the NLDS and allowed one run on two hits in 3 1/3 innings over four games in the NLCS. In the 2020 World Series against the Tampa Bay Rays, he allowed two runs (on two solo home runs) in 3 1/3 over three games as the Dodgers secured the championship.

=== Houston Astros ===
On January 15, 2021, Báez signed a two-year, $12.5 million contract with the Houston Astros. Báez missed the beginning of the season after he tested positive for COVID-19 in Spring Training and was placed on the 60-day injured list on April 26, 2021, with shoulder soreness. On August 10, Báez was activated off of the injured list. He appeared in three games early in the 2022 season for Houston, tallying 2 1/3 total innings and allowing five hits, three walks, and three earned runs. On April 26, 2022, Baez was designated for assignment. Baez cleared waivers and was released by the Astros the following day.

=== Los Angeles Dodgers (second stint) ===
On May 19, 2022, Báez signed a minor league deal to return to the Los Angeles Dodgers organization. He pitched in five games in the Arizona Complex League and seven games for the Oklahoma City Dodgers, allowing 11 runs in 11 innings. He was released on August 20.

== Nickname ==
During the 2018 MLB Players Weekend, Báez wore the nickname "LA MULA" ("THE MULE" in Spanish) on his jersey. Báez says he earned the nickname for his tremendous work ethic in the Los Angeles Dodgers bullpen. He was also known as the "Human Rain Delay" due to his extremely slow pitching style.
