= Luke Raley =

American baseball player (born 1994)

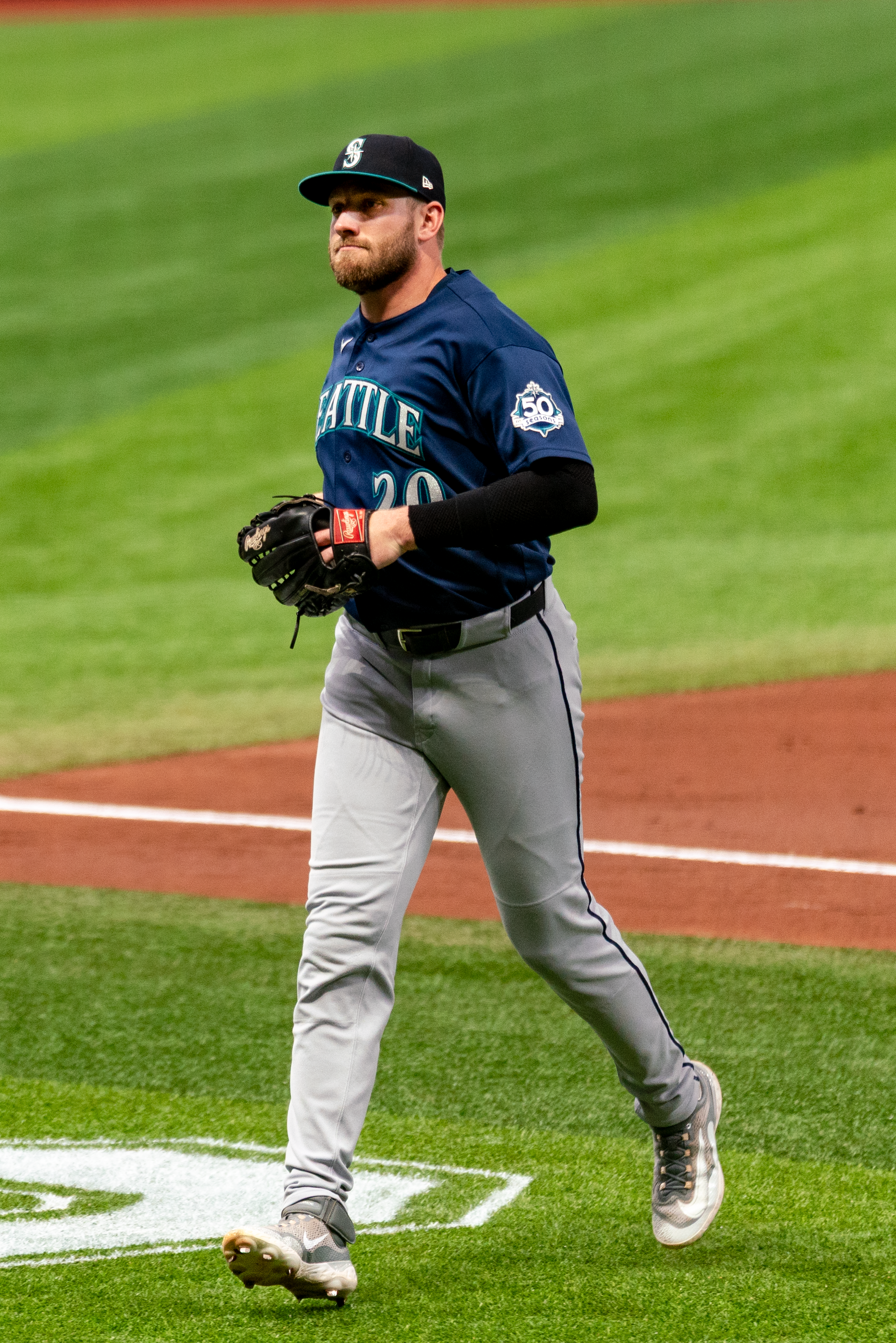
- Raley with the Seattle Mariners in 2026

Free agent
- Outfielder / First baseman
- Born: September 19, 1994 (age 32); Hinckley, Ohio, U.S.
- Bats: Left Throws: Right

MLB debut
- April 9, 2021, for the Los Angeles Dodgers

MLB statistics (through 2026 season)
- Batting average: .230
- Home runs: 63
- Runs batted in: 173
- Stats at Baseball Reference

Teams
- Los Angeles Dodgers (2021); Tampa Bay Rays (2022–2023); Seattle Mariners (2024–2026)

Lucas John Raley (born September 19, 1994) is an American professional baseball outfielder and first baseman who is a free agent. He has previously played in Major League Baseball (MLB) for the Los Angeles Dodgers, Tampa Bay Rays, and Seattle Mariners.

== Amateur career ==
Raley graduated from Highland High School in Medina, Ohio. He was named to the Ohio All-State Baseball Team as a senior. After going undrafted out of high school, he enrolled at Lake Erie College, where he played college baseball. In 2014, he briefly played collegiate summer baseball for the Bourne Braves of the Cape Cod Baseball League. As a junior at Lake Erie in 2016, he hit .424 with 12 home runs, 39 runs batted in (RBI), and a .528 on-base percentage in 47 games.

== Professional career ==
=== Los Angeles Dodgers ===
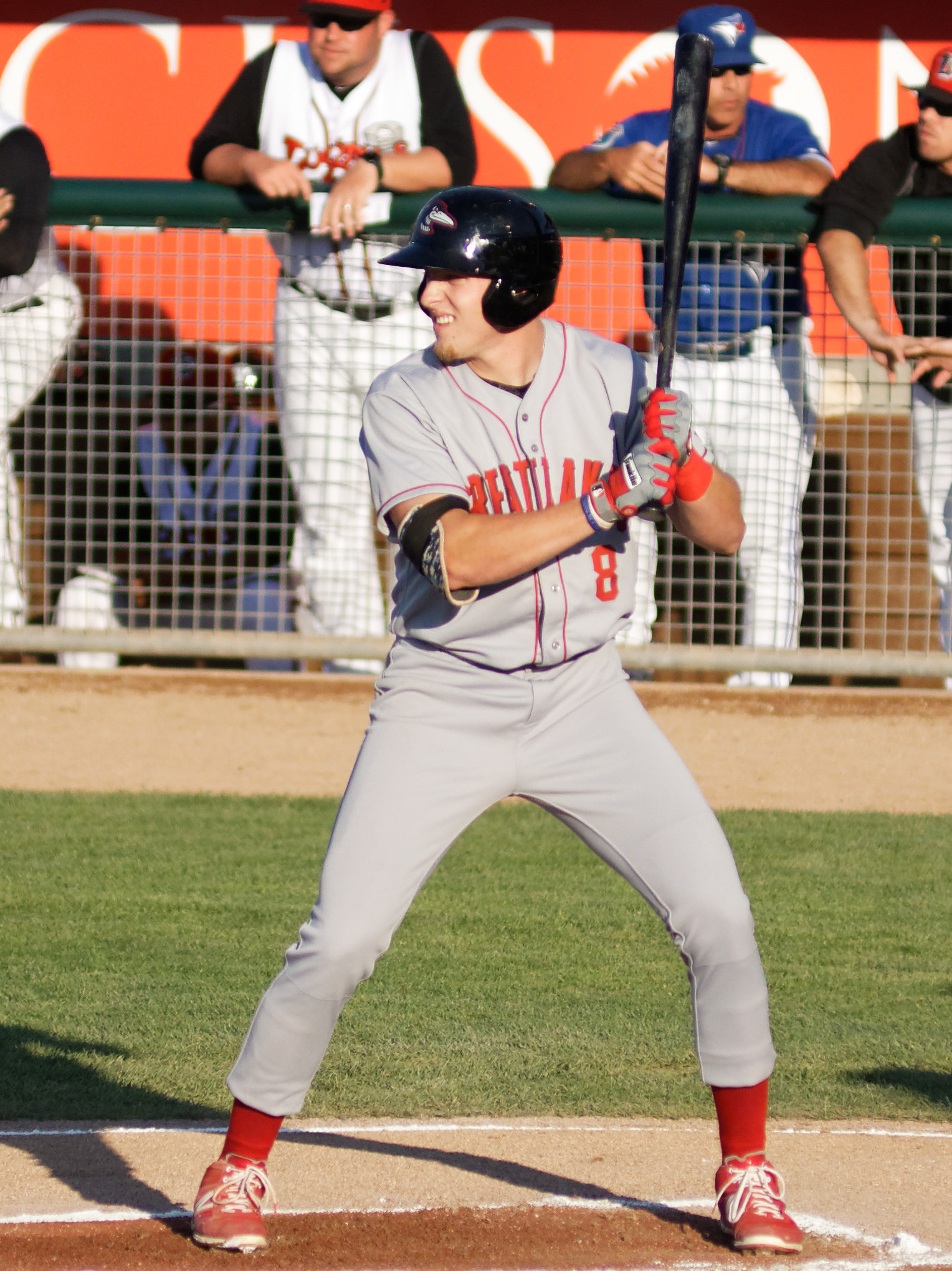
Raley with the Great Lakes Loons in 2016

The Los Angeles Dodgers selected Raley in the seventh round of the 2016 MLB draft, and he signed for $150,000. He was assigned to the Arizona League Dodgers for one week, where he hit .625 in five games. He was promoted to the Ogden Raptors on June 27. After batting .417 in five games in one week with Ogden, he was promoted again to the Great Lakes Loons on July 7. He finished 2016 with Great Lakes batting .245 with two home runs and 17 RBIs in 56 games. Raley was promoted again to the Rancho Cucamonga Quakes for the 2017 season, slashing .295/.375/.473 with 14 home runs and 62 RBIs in 123 games. He was a California League All-Star that season. He began 2018 with the Tulsa Drillers and was selected to the Texas League All-Star Game.

=== Minnesota Twins ===
On July 31, 2018, Raley was traded to the Minnesota Twins, with prospects Devin Smeltzer and Logan Forsythe, for former All-Star Brian Dozier. Raley played for the Chattanooga Lookouts for the remainder of 2018. In 120 Double-A games with Tulsa and Chattanooga, he hit .275 with 20 home runs and 69 RBIs. He spent 2019 with the Triple-A Rochester Red Wings, playing in only 33 games due to a left ankle injury. He was productive when he could play, hitting .302/.362/.516 with seven home runs and 21 RBIs. He played for the Salt River Rafters of the Arizona Fall League after the 2019 season. Raley was added to the Twins' 40-man roster on November 20.

=== Los Angeles Dodgers (second stint) ===
On February 10, 2020, the Twins traded Raley, Brusdar Graterol, and the 66th pick in the 2020 Major League Baseball draft to the Dodgers for Kenta Maeda, Jaír Camargo, and cash. Raley did not play a minor league game in 2020 due to the cancellation of the minor league season caused by the COVID-19 pandemic, but he did play at the Dodgers alternate training site.

On April 9, 2021, Raley was promoted to the major leagues for the first time. He made his MLB debut that night as a defensive replacement in right field in the eighth inning. In his first at-bat, he grounded out to first base against Sam Clay of the Washington Nationals. His first career hit came on April 14, an opposite-field double against Daniel Bard of the Colorado Rockies. On April 16, Raley hit his first career home run off of a slider from Dan Altavilla of the San Diego Padres. His second MLB home run was the longest for the Dodgers that season, traveling 472 feet at Coors Field on September 22. He was called up by the Dodgers seven different times during 2021. Raley played in 33 games for the Dodgers during the season, hitting .182/ .250/.288 with two home runs and four RBI, and 25 strikeouts in 66 at bats. He also appeared in 72 games for the Triple-A Oklahoma City Dodgers, hitting .294 with 19 homers and 69 RBI. He struck out in his lone at-bat in the National League Wild Card Game, his first postseason appearance.

=== Tampa Bay Rays ===
On March 18, 2022, Raley was traded to the Tampa Bay Rays for pitcher Tanner Dodson. Raley began the season with the Durham Bulls, where he batted .299/.374/.575 with seven home runs and 25 RBIs in 24 games. He was promoted to the majors on June 21, following injuries to Kevin Kiermaier and Manuel Margot. Raley finished the year playing in 22 MLB games, hitting .197/.306/.279 with one home run and four RBIs and 24 strikeouts in 64 at bats.

In 2023, Raley made the Rays out of spring training, in part because he was out of minor league options. He played regularly for the Rays, slashing .249/.333/.490 with 19 home runs and 49 RBIs in 118 games before suffering an injury on a collision during batting practice on September 16 that limited him to one at bat for rest of the season. One of his home runs was an inside-the-park shot on August 16 that bounced off the walls of Oracle Park in San Francisco several times before rolling away from fielders. The Rays avoided having Raley face left-handed pitchers, though he hit .268 in his 41 at bats against lefties, albeit with worse patience and power.

=== Seattle Mariners ===
The Rays traded Raley to the Seattle Mariners on January 5, 2024 for infielder José Caballero. On August 2, Raley hit the Mariners' longest home run of the season, a 459-foot homer against the Philadelphia Phillies at T-Mobile Park. He slashed .243/.320/.463 with 22 home runs and 58 RBI in 137 games for the Mariners in 2024. He fared worse against lefties, batting .182 with a .570 OPS in 82 plate appearances.

On April 30, 2025, Raley was placed on the injured list due to a right oblique strain and was expected to miss at least six weeks. He was activated from the injured list on June 20. He appeared in 73 games for Seattle, hitting .202 with four home runs and 19 RBI. He was a bench player in the American League Division Series, batting 0-for-4 with one hit by pitch and one run scored in four games.

On May 9, 2026, Raley hit two home runs with a career-high 7 RBI in a win over the Chicago White Sox. On August 1, he was placed on the 10-day injured list due to a left forearm strain, having experienced discomfort in the area for some time. He was expected to miss the rest of the season. On August 6, Raley confirmed that he would require season-ending surgery to repair the flexor tendon in his arm. In his third season with the Mariners, he hit .225 with 15 home runs in 93 games. On November 20, the Mariners non-tendered Raley, and he became a free agent.

== Personal life ==
Raley married his wife in December 2023. His wife gave birth to their first child in February 2025. Raley's parents operate a Christmas tree farm near Cleveland.
