= Matt Beaty =

American baseball player (born 1993)

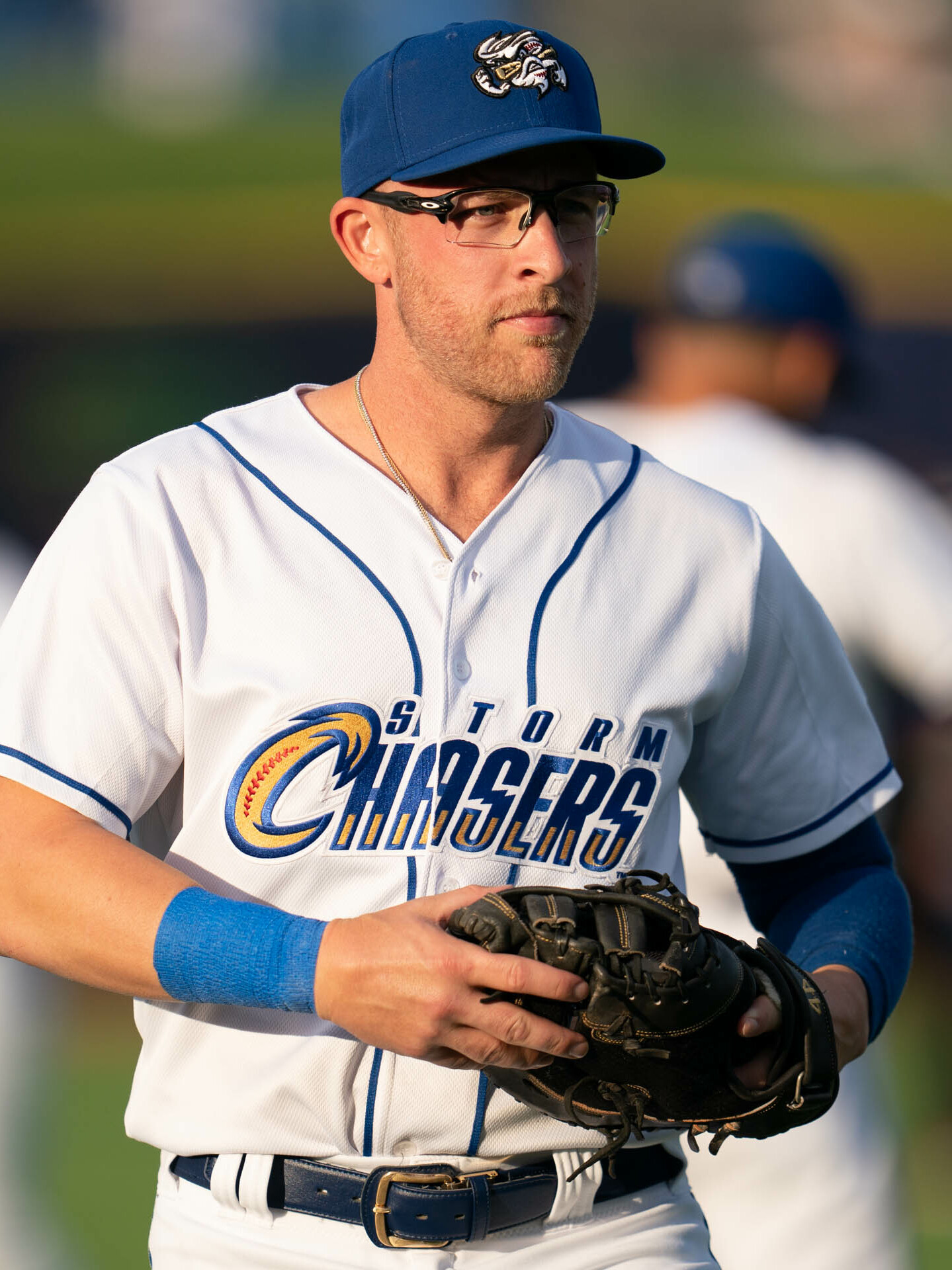
- Beaty with the Omaha Storm Chasers in 2023
- First baseman / Left fielder
- Born: April 28, 1993 (age 33); Snellville, Georgia, U.S.
- Batted: Left Threw: Right

MLB debut
- April 30, 2019, for the Los Angeles Dodgers

Last MLB appearance
- September 6, 2023, for the Kansas City Royals

MLB statistics
- Batting average: .247
- Home runs: 18
- Runs batted in: 96
- Stats at Baseball Reference

Teams
- Los Angeles Dodgers (2019–2021); San Diego Padres (2022); San Francisco Giants (2023); Kansas City Royals (2023)

Career highlights and awards
- World Series champion (2020)

Matthew Thomas Beaty (born April 28, 1993) is an American former professional baseball first baseman and left fielder. He played in Major League Baseball (MLB) for the Los Angeles Dodgers, San Diego Padres, San Francisco Giants, and Kansas City Royals. He played college baseball for the Belmont Bruins. The Dodgers selected Beaty in the 12th round of the 2015 MLB draft, and he made his MLB debut with them in 2019.

== Amateur career ==
Beaty attended Dresden High School in Dresden, Tennessee. The Kansas City Royals selected him in the 48th round of the 2011 MLB draft, but he did not sign. Beaty attended Belmont University and played college baseball for the Belmont Bruins. In 2015 he batted .382/.469/.668 with 24 doubles (4th in the Ohio Valley Conference), 4 triples (3rd), 12 home runs (5th), 76 RBIs (leading the conference), and 12 stolen bases (9th) in 238 at bats.

== Professional career ==
=== Los Angeles Dodgers ===
The Los Angeles Dodgers selected Beaty in the 12th round of the 2015 Major League Baseball draft and he signed with them. He spent 2015 with both the Ogden Raptors and Great Lakes Loons, posting a combined .314 batting average with four home runs and 28 runs batted in (RBIs) in 68 total games between both clubs. He spent 2016 with the Rancho Cucamonga Quakes, compiling a .297 batting average with 30 doubles (7th in the league), 11 home runs, 7 sacrifice flies (leading the league), and 88 RBIs (3rd in the league) in 124 games.

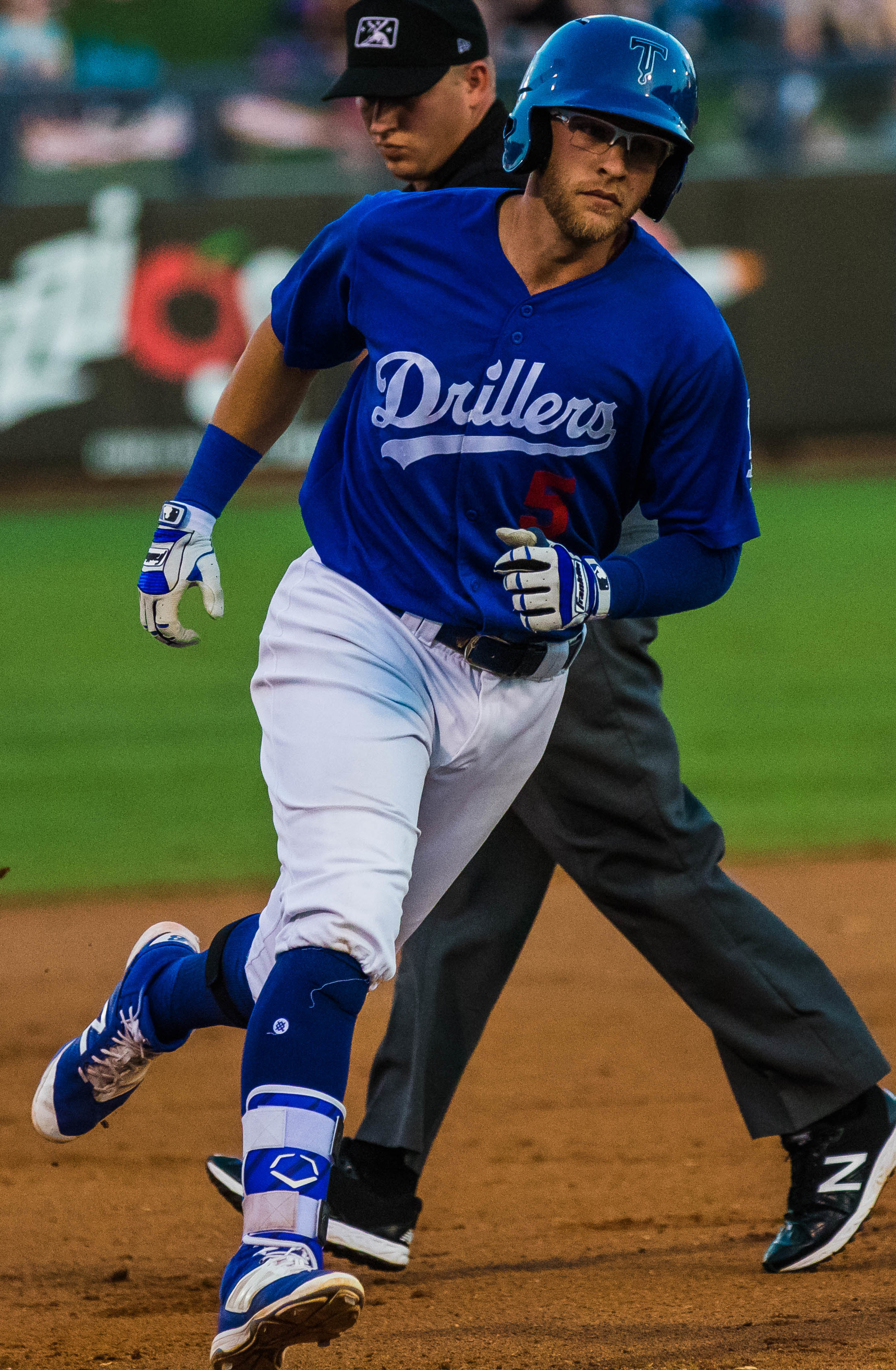
Beaty with the Tulsa Drillers

Beaty spent the 2017 season with the Tulsa Drillers of the Double-A Texas League, and he slashed .326/.378/.505 with 21 doubles (tied for the Texas League lead), 15 home runs (10th) and 69 RBIs (5th) in 116 games, winning the Texas League Player of the Year Award. He also won the league batting title. He was assigned to play in the Arizona Fall League and was chosen for the Fall Stars Game showcase. Beaty played for the Oklahoma City Dodgers of the Triple-A Pacific Coast League in 2018, batting .277.378/.406 with one home run and 12 RBIs in 31 games.

The Dodgers added him to their 40-man roster after the 2018 season. He began 2019 with Oklahoma City, for whom he batted .306/.378/.455, and was promoted him to the major leagues on April 30. He made his MLB debut that night against the San Francisco Giants, singling off of Ty Blach. His first MLB homer was off of Kyle Hendricks of the Chicago Cubs on June 14. He hit a walk-off homer against the Colorado Rockies on June 21. He appeared in 99 games for the Dodgers in 2019, with 35 games each in the outfield and at first base and nine games at third base. He hit .265/.317/.458 with nine homers and 46 RBIs.

In the pandemic-shortened 2020 season, Beaty played 13 games at first base for the Dodgers, in addition to two in left field and five as the designated hitter. He hit .220/.278/.360 in 50 at bats, with two homers and five RBIs. He was optioned to the Dodgers alternate training site on September 11, and remained there for the rest of the regular season. He did rejoin the Dodgers roster for the postseason, but only appeared in two games in the 2020 NLCS and did not record a hit in three at-bats.

Beaty hit his first career grand slam off of Alec Bettinger of the Milwaukee Brewers on May 2, 2021. Beaty played in 120 games for the Dodgers in 2021, primarily as a pinch hitter, and had a .270 batting average with seven home runs and 40 RBIs. He appeared in nine games for the Dodgers in the playoffs, getting 11 at-bats and recording only one hit. He was designated for assignment by the Dodgers on March 23, 2022.

=== San Diego Padres ===
On March 28, 2022, Beaty was traded to the San Diego Padres in exchange for River Ryan. Beaty was placed on the 60-day injured list on June 17 with a shoulder injury. He was activated on August 17, and subsequently optioned to the Triple-A El Paso Chihuahuas. Beaty batted 4-for-43 (.093) in 20 games for San Diego. On September 10, Beaty was designated for assignment. He declined his assignment to Triple-A and became a free agent on September 14.

=== San Francisco Giants ===
On January 10, 2023, Beaty signed a minor league contract with the Kansas City Royals organization. On March 30, he was traded to the San Francisco Giants for cash and added to the 40-man roster. Beaty appeared in only 4 games for San Francisco, spending the majority of his time with the Triple-A Sacramento River Cats. In 30 games, he batted .272/.406/.447 with 4 home runs in 23 RBI. On May 30, Beaty was designated for assignment. He cleared waivers and elected free agency on June 6.

=== Kansas City Royals ===
On June 12, 2023, Beaty once again signed a minor league contract with the Kansas City Royals organization. After 3 games with the Triple–A Omaha Storm Chasers, Beaty was selected to the major league roster on June 18. In 26 games for Kansas City, Beaty batted .232/.358/.304 with three RBI. On September 19, he was designated for assignment. Beaty cleared waivers and was sent outright to Triple–A Omaha on September 21. On October 2, Beaty elected free agency.

=== Arizona Diamondbacks ===
On May 20, 2024, Beaty signed a minor league contract with the Arizona Diamondbacks, who assigned him to the Amarillo Sod Poodles of the Texas League. In 53 games split between Amarillo and the Triple–A Reno Aces, he slashed a combined .276/.368/.389 with five home runs and 23 RBI. Beaty was released by the Diamondbacks organization on September 7.

On August 25, 2026, Beaty announced his retirement from professional baseball.

== Personal life ==
Beaty was born to David Beaty and Lynn Beaty. He has an older sister, Jennifer, and a younger brother, Kyle. Beaty married his high school sweetheart, Jesica Parsley Beaty, in 2016. He asked her to marry him by presenting her with a custom-made bobblehead in the image of Beaty proposing to Parsley.

Beaty and his wife began the Matt Beaty Fund for Weakley County student-athletes going to play at the next level, and the funds will also be used to help the sports programs in the county.
