= Connor McGuiness =

American baseball player and coach (born 1989)

Los Angeles Dodgers – No. 87
- Coach
- Born: October 22, 1989 (age 36)
- Bats: Right Throws: Left

Teams
- Los Angeles Dodgers (2020–present)

Career highlights and awards
- 3× World Series champion (2020, 2024, 2025)

Connor McGuiness (born October 22, 1989) is an American professional baseball coach for the Los Angeles Dodgers of Major League Baseball (MLB).

== Career ==
McGuiness played college baseball at Emory University from 2009 to 2012, appearing in 41 games as a pitcher. He rejoined the school as pitching coach in 2014. He joined the Dodgers organization as a minor league pitching coach in 2017, working for the Rancho Cucamonga Quakes, Glendale Desert Dogs and Great Lakes Loons. In 2020 he joined the major league staff as assistant pitching coach.
