= Omar Estevez =

Cuban baseball player (born 1998)

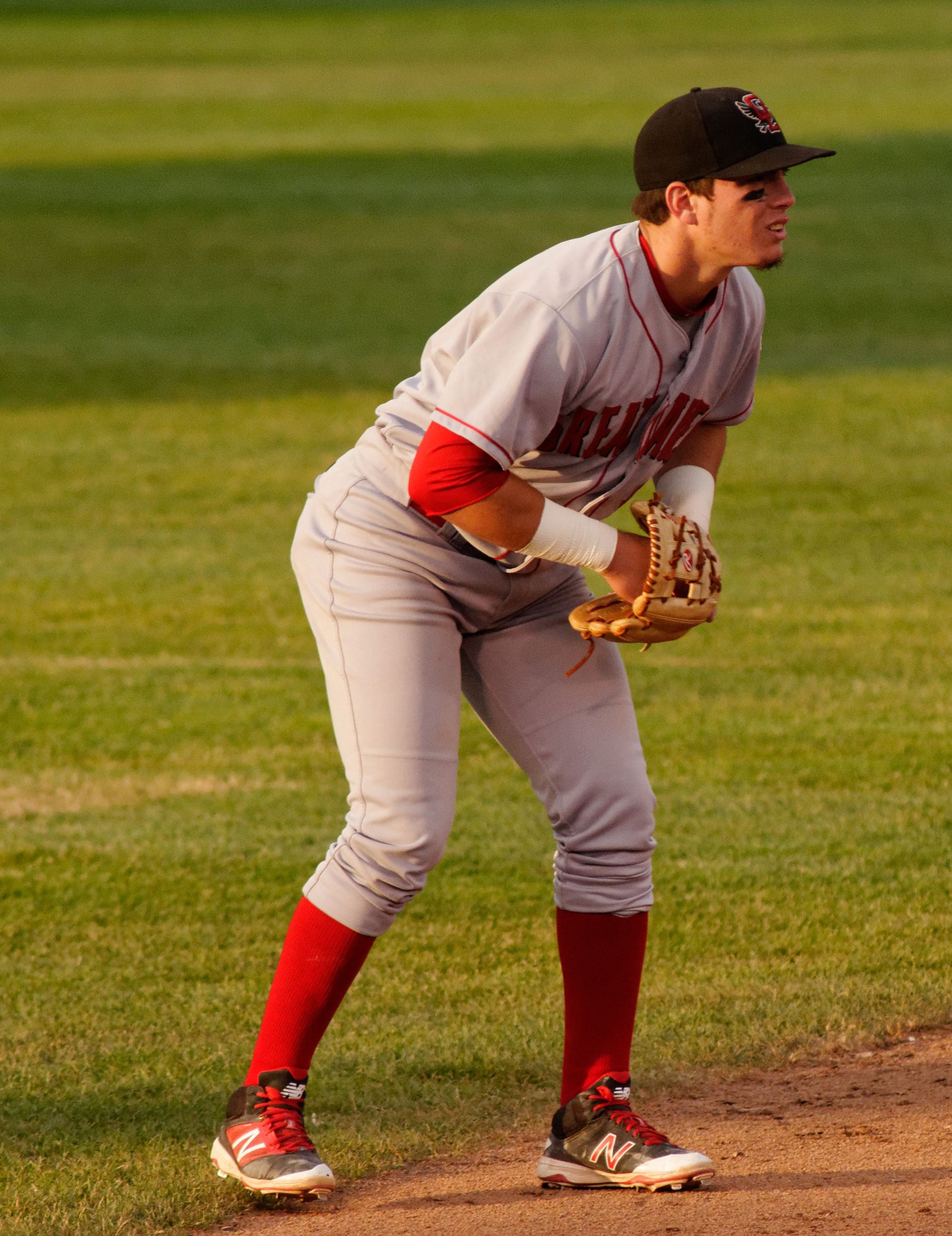
- Estevez with the Great Lakes Loons
- Shortstop / Second baseman
- Born: February 25, 1998 (age 28); Matanzas, Cuba
- Bats: Right Throws: Right

Omar Estevez (born February 2, 1998) is a Cuban former professional baseball shortstop.

== Career ==
Estevez plated for Matanzas in the Cuban National Series as a 16-year old during the 2014–2015 season. He signed with the Los Angeles Dodgers as an international free agent in November 2015 for a $6 million bonus. He made his professional debut with the Great Lakes Loons of the Midwest League in 2016, hitting .255 in 122 games. Estevez was promoted to the Rancho Cucamonga Quakes of the California League, where he spent the 2017 and 2018 seasons. In 2019, he was promoted to the Tulsa Drillers of the Texas League and he hit .291 in 83 games with six homers and 36 RBI.

Estevez did not play in a game in 2020 due to the cancellation of the minor league season because of the COVID-19 pandemic. In 2021, he was assigned to the Triple-A Oklahoma City Dodgers where he batted .199/.281/.308 with nine home runs and 48 RBI in 106 appearances. Estevez returned to Oklahoma City in 2022, and slashed .216/.275/.333 with three home runs and 24 RBI in 52 games. He elected free agency following the season on November 10, 2022.
