= Kendall Williams (baseball) =

American baseball player (born 2000)

- Pitcher
- Born: August 24, 2000 (age 26); Olive Branch, Mississippi, U.S.
- Bats: Right Throws: Right

Kendall Allen Williams (born August 24, 2000) is an American former professional baseball pitcher.

== Career ==
=== Toronto Blue Jays ===
Williams attended IMG Academy in Bradenton, Florida, and was drafted by the Toronto Blue Jays in the second round, with the 52nd overall selection, of the 2019 Major League Baseball draft. He turned down a scholarship offer by Vanderbilt University to sign with the Blue Jays. He began his professional career with the rookie–level Gulf Coast League Blue Jays, where he made five starts (six appearances) and allowed two earned runs in 16 innings. Williams did not play in a game in 2020 due to the cancellation of the minor league season because of the COVID-19 pandemic.

=== Los Angeles Dodgers ===
Williams was traded to the Los Angeles Dodgers on September 1, 2020 (along with another player to be named later) in exchange for Ross Stripling. The Dodgers assigned him to the Rancho Cucamonga Quakes of the new Low-A West league for 2021, where he was 3–3 with a 5.98 ERA in 23 appearances (19 starts) and struck out 87 batters while walking 22. In 2022, he began the season with the Quakes and was promoted to the Great Lakes Loons of the High–A Midwest League. He finished with a 3–6 record and 4.32 ERA in 27 games (24 starts).

In 2023, he began with the Loons and was promoted to the Double–A Tulsa Drillers. Between the two leagues (and one rehab appearance in the Arizona Complex League) he made 16 appearances (15 starts) with a 4–6 record and 3.42 ERA. At the end of the season, he made one start for the Triple–A Oklahoma City Dodgers, allowing five runs in six innings. He was selected to play for the Glendale Desert Dogs in the Arizona Fall League after the season and made the Fall Stars game. In 20 starts for Tulsa in 2024, he was 4–10 with a 6.70 ERA. Williams was released by the Dodgers on August 5, 2024.
