= Brusdar Graterol =

Venezuelan baseball player (born 1998)

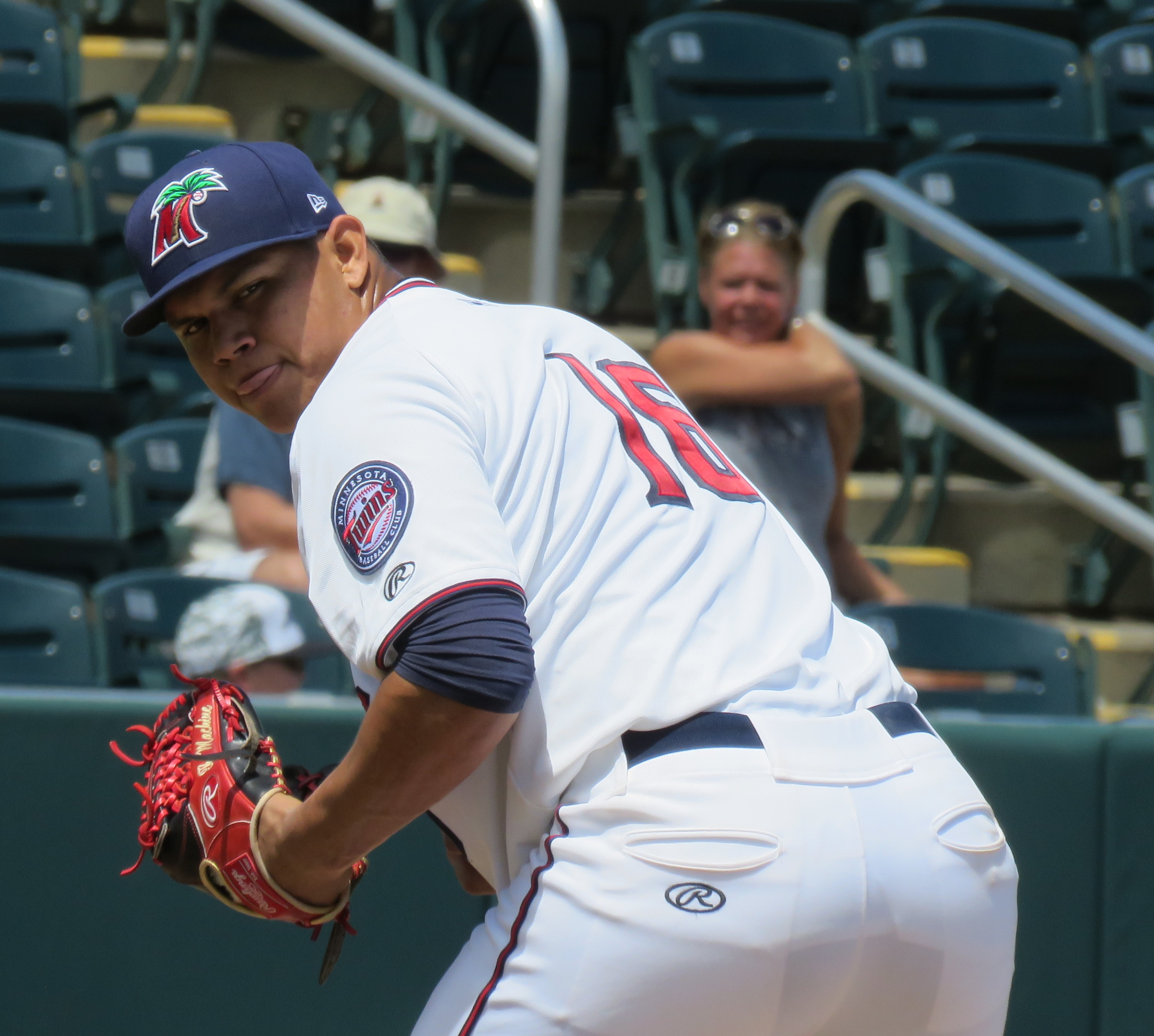
- Graterol with the Fort Myers Miracle in 2018

Free agent
- Pitcher
- Born: August 26, 1998 (age 28); Calabozo, Venezuela
- Bats: Right Throws: Right

MLB debut
- September 1, 2019, for the Minnesota Twins

MLB statistics (through 2024 season)
- Win–loss record: 11–9
- Earned run average: 2.78
- Strikeouts: 148
- Stats at Baseball Reference

Teams
- Minnesota Twins (2019); Los Angeles Dodgers (2020–2024)

Career highlights and awards
- 2× World Series champion (2020, 2024)

Brusdar Javier Graterol (born August 26, 1998) is a Venezuelan professional baseball pitcher who is a free agent. He has previously played in Major League Baseball (MLB) for the Minnesota Twins and Los Angeles Dodgers. Graterol made his debut with the Twins in 2019 and was traded to the Dodgers prior to the 2020 season. He is a two-time World Series champion.

== Career ==
=== Minnesota Twins ===
Graterol signed with the Minnesota Twins as an international free agent in August 2014. He made his professional debut in 2015 with the Dominican Summer League Twins where he was 0–1 with a 2.45 earned run average (ERA) in four starts. He missed the 2016 season after undergoing Tommy John surgery and returned from the injury in 2017 and pitched for the Gulf Coast Twins and Elizabethton Twins, going 4–1 with a 2.70 ERA in 10 games (seven starts).

Graterol started 2018 with the Cedar Rapids Kernels (with whom he was named a Midwest League all-star) and was promoted to the Fort Myers Miracle in June. In 19 starts between the two teams, he went 8–4 with a 2.74 ERA and a 1.15 WHIP. He began the 2019 season with the Pensacola Blue Wahoos, earning Southern League all-star honors.

On September 1, 2019, the Twins selected Graterol's contract and promoted him to the major leagues. He made his major-league debut that day versus the Detroit Tigers, striking out the first batter he faced (Dawel Lugo) and pitching a scoreless inning in relief. In 2019 with the Twins, he was 1–1 with a 4.66 ERA, making 10 appearances totaling 9 2/3 innings while striking out 10 batters.

=== Los Angeles Dodgers ===
On February 10, 2020, the Twins traded Graterol, Luke Raley, and the 67th pick in the 2020 Major League Baseball draft to the Los Angeles Dodgers for Kenta Maeda, Jaír Camargo, and cash considerations. In the pandemic-shortened 2020 season, he appeared in 23 games (two starts) for the Dodgers and allowed eight earned runs in 23 1/3 innings, for a 3.09 ERA. In the postseason, he pitched one scoreless inning to pick up the save in the second game of the Wild Card Series and 1 1/3 scoreless innings in the second game of the 2020 NLDS. In the 2020 NLCS against the Atlanta Braves, he pitched in four games, allowing three runs in 3 1/3 innings and in the 2020 World Series against the Tampa Bay Rays he pitched two scoreless innings over three games as the Dodgers won the championship.

In 2021, Graterol pitched in 34 games for the Dodgers, with a 3–0 record and 4.59 ERA. In the postseason, he pitched one inning in the Wild Card Game, 3 2/3 innings in the 2021 NLDS and 4 1/3 innings in the 2021 NLCS, allowing only one run on four hits while striking out seven. In 2022, he pitched in 46 games and was 2–4 with a 3.26 ERA in 49 2/3 innings. He also picked up four saves, with his first career save being on June 26 against the Braves.

On January 13, 2023, Graterol agreed to a one-year, $1.225 million contract with the Dodgers, avoiding salary arbitration. He pitched in 68 games in 2023, with a 1.20 ERA and seven saves. In his second season of arbitration, Graterol increased his salary to $2.7 million for 2024.

In 2024, Graterol began the season on the injured list with a sore shoulder and didn't rejoin the active roster until August 5. In his first game back, he recorded one out, gave up a single and suffered a hamstring strain while pitching to the next batter, putting him back on the injured list after just eight pitches. He rejoined the roster again on September 10 only to return to the injured list on September 26 due to shoulder inflammation. In total, he pitched in 7 1/3 innings and allowed two earned runs. Despite not appearing in the first two rounds of the playoffs, Graterol was added to the Dodgers roster for the 2024 World Series. He pitched 2 1/3 innings over parts of three games, allowing one run on two hits and four walks. Graterol underwent labrum surgery after the series to address the shoulder issues that had plagued him during the season, putting his status for 2025 in doubt. On September 20, he was officially ruled out for the season.

Graterol pitched in a few minor league rehab games with the Triple-A Oklahoma City Comets in May 2026, his first game action in over a year. He later suffered a back injury in that rehab assignment that led to surgery, leading to him returning to the 60-day injured list and missing all of the 2026 season.

== Personal life ==
Graterol grew up near Calabozo, Venezuela, and was raised by his mother, Ysmalia, and grandparents. He married Allison Landa on January 22, 2021.

== See also ==
- List of Major League Baseball players from Venezuela
