= Marshall Kasowski =

American baseball player (born 1995)

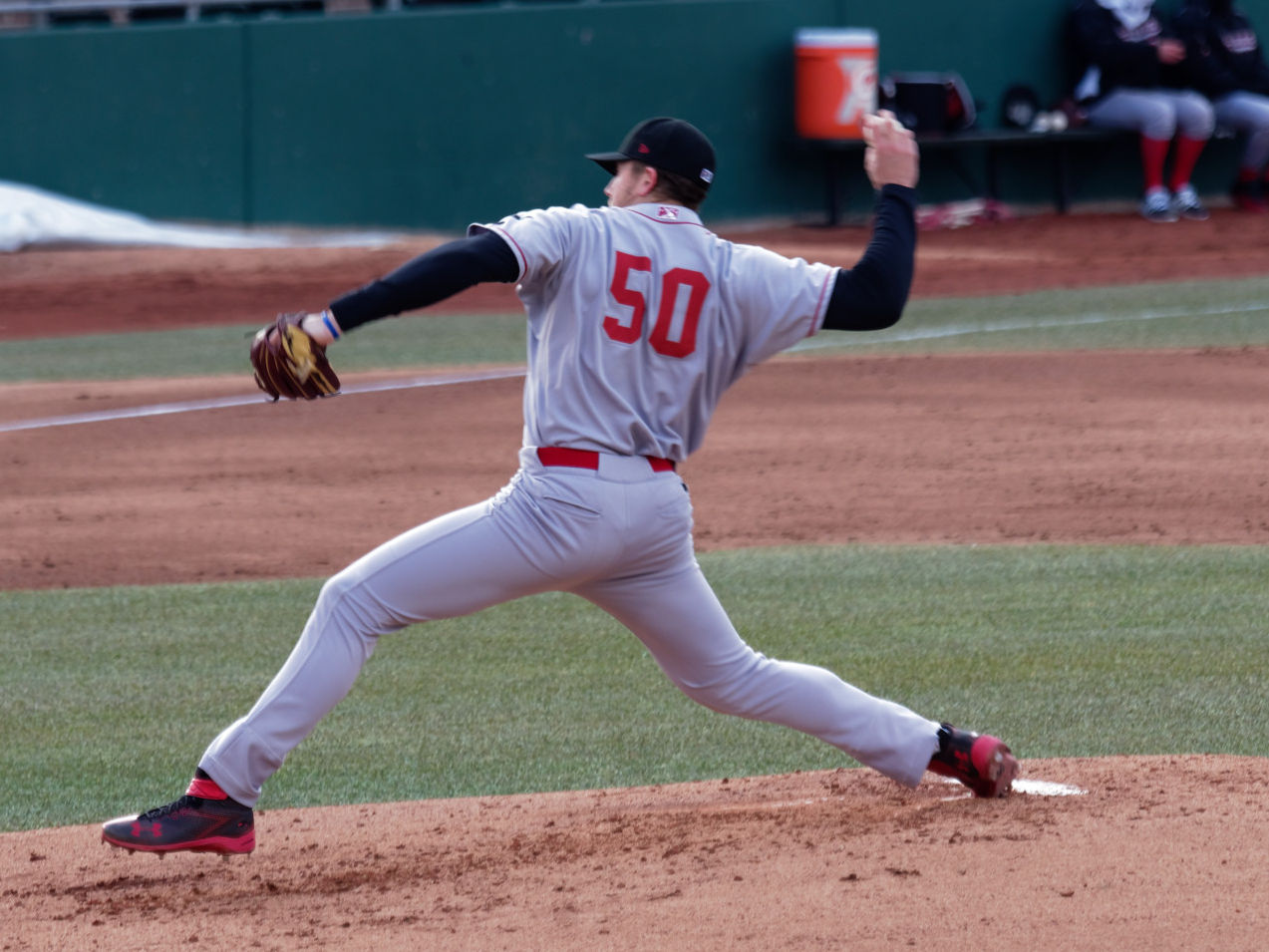
- Pitcher
- Born: March 10, 1995 (age 31); Conroe, Texas, U.S.
- Bats: Left Throws: Right

Marshall Austin Kasowski (born March 10, 1995) is an American former professional baseball pitcher.

== Career ==
=== Los Angeles Dodgers ===
Kasowski attended Oak Ridge High School in Conroe, Texas and played college baseball at the Panola College, the University of Houston and West Texas A&M University. In 2015, he suffered serious head injuries in a car accident that nearly ended his baseball career.

Kasowski was drafted by the Los Angeles Dodgers in the 13th round of the 2017 Major League Baseball draft. He spent his first professional season with the Arizona League Dodgers and Great Lakes Loons, pitching to a combined 1–1 record with a 3.18 ERA in 11.1 innings pitched. In 2018, he played for Great Lakes, the Rancho Cucamonga Quakes and Tulsa Drillers. In 41 games between the three clubs, he pitched to a 2–1 record with a 2.09 ERA, striking out 111 batters in 64.2 innings pitched. In 2019, he returned to Tulsa where he appeared in 27 games and was 4–3 with a 2.27 ERA. Kasowksi did not play in a game in 2020 due to the cancellation of the minor league season because of the COVID-19 pandemic.

Kasowski started 2021 on the injured list, eventually pitching in 13 games between the Triple-A Oklahoma City Dodgers and the ACL Dodgers, with a 4.38 ERA. He made 47 appearances for Oklahoma City in 2022, with a 3.70 ERA. Kasowski pitched in only four games for Oklahoma City in 2023, allowing three earned runs in 4 2/3 innings before he was released on May 30, 2023.

=== Mariachis de Guadalajara ===
On June 2, 2023, Kasowski signed with the Mariachis de Guadalajara of the Mexican League. In 5 starts, he posted a 0–2 record with a 8.85 ERA and 14 strikeouts over 20 1/3 innings. Kasowski was waived on July 3.

=== Winnipeg Goldeyes ===
On January 10, 2024, Kasowski signed with the Winnipeg Goldeyes of the American Association of Professional Baseball. In 2 starts for Winnipeg, he recorded a 2.38 ERA with 15 strikeouts across 11 1/3 innings pitched.

=== Charros de Jalisco ===
On June 23, 2024, Kasowski was loaned to the Charros de Jalisco of the Mexican League. In 3 games for Jalisco, he recorded a 3.86 ERA with 5 strikeouts across 7 innings of work. Kasowski was released by the Charros on October 9.

=== Winnipeg Goldeyes (second stint) ===
On December 5, 2024, Kasowski signed with the Winnipeg Goldeyes of the American Association of Professional Baseball. However, Kasowski was released by Winnipeg prior to the start of the season on April 1, 2025.
