= Pacific Coast League Most Valuable Player Award =

- Sport: Baseball
- League: Pacific Coast League
- Awarded for: Regular-season most valuable player in the Pacific Coast League
- Country: United States; Canada
- Presented by: Pacific Coast League

History
- First award: Lefty O'Doul (1927)
- Most wins: Steve Bilko (3)
- Most recent: Zac Veen (2026)

The Pacific Coast League Most Valuable Player Award (MVP) is an annual award given to the best player in Minor League Baseball's Pacific Coast League based on their regular-season performance as voted on by league managers. From 1932 to 1947, the award was voted upon by writers from The Sporting News. Broadcasters, Minor League Baseball executives, and members of the media have previously voted as well. Though the league was established in 1903, the award was not created until 1927. No MVP was selected from 1928 to 1931. In 1948, Charlie Graham donated a plaque, which was named in his honor, to be awarded annually to the league's MVP. The award was suspended for six seasons in the 1970s (1973, 1975–1979). After the cancellation of the 2020 season, the league was known as the Triple-A West in 2021 before reverting to the Pacific Coast League name in 2022.

Thirty-one outfielders have won the MVP Award, the most of any position. First basemen, with 20 winners, have won the most among infielders, followed by third basemen (11) and second basemen and shortstops (4). Eleven pitchers and eight catchers have won the award.

Ten players who have won the MVP Award also won the Pacific Coast League Top MLB Prospect Award (formerly the Rookie of the Year Award) in the same season: Willie Davis (1960), Billy Cowan (1963), Denny Doyle (1969), Robb Quinlan (2002), Adam Eaton (2012), Chris Owings (2013), Joc Pederson (2014), Joshua Fuentes (2018), Ty France (2019), and Michael Busch (2023). The Pacific Coast League sporadically issued a Pitcher of the Year Award from 1957 to 1974 and continuously since 2001. No pitcher has won both awards. Three players have won the MVP Award on multiple occasions. Steve Bilko, who won for three consecutive years from 1955 to 1957, has the most wins. Sandy Alomar Jr. (1988 and 1989) and Les Scarsella (1944 and 1946) both won the award twice.

Seven players from the Las Vegas Aviators and Los Angeles Angels have each been selected for the MVP Award, more than any other teams in the league, followed by the Albuquerque Dukes and San Diego Padres (6); the Hollywood Stars and Sacramento River Cats (5); the Oakland Oaks, Oklahoma City Comets, Reno Aces, San Francisco Seals, and Spokane Indians (4); the Albuquerque Isotopes, Calgary Cannons, Seattle Rainiers, and Tucson Sidewinders (3); the Edmonton Trappers, El Paso Chihuahuas, Fresno Grizzlies, Iowa Cubs, Phoenix Firebirds, Sacramento Solons, Salt Lake City Bees, and Tacoma Rainiers (2); and the Eugene Emeralds, Indianapolis Indians, Omaha Royals, Salt Lake Bees, and Tulsa Oilers (1).

Fifteen players from the Los Angeles Dodgers Major League Baseball (MLB) organization have won the award, more than any other, followed by the Chicago Cubs organization (9); the San Diego Padres and San Francisco Giants organizations (6); the Arizona Diamondbacks organization (5); the Athletics, Houston Astros, and Seattle Mariners organizations (4); the Chicago White Sox, Pittsburgh Pirates, and St. Louis Cardinals organizations (3); the Cincinnati Reds, Colorado Rockies, Los Angeles Angels, Philadelphia Phillies, Texas Rangers, and Toronto Blue Jays organizations (2); and the Cleveland Guardians, Kansas City Royals, and New York Yankees organizations (1). Twelve award winners played for teams that were not affiliated with any MLB organization.

== Winners ==
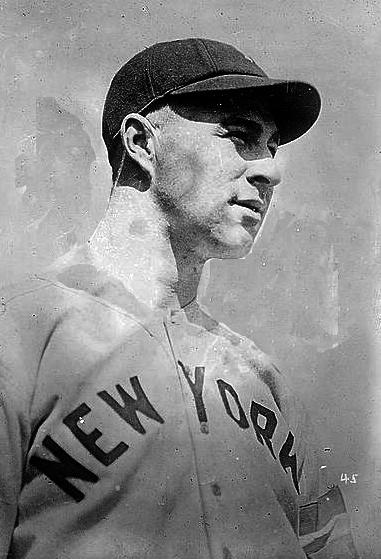
Lefty O'Doul won the first Pacific Coast League Most Valuable Player Award in 1927.

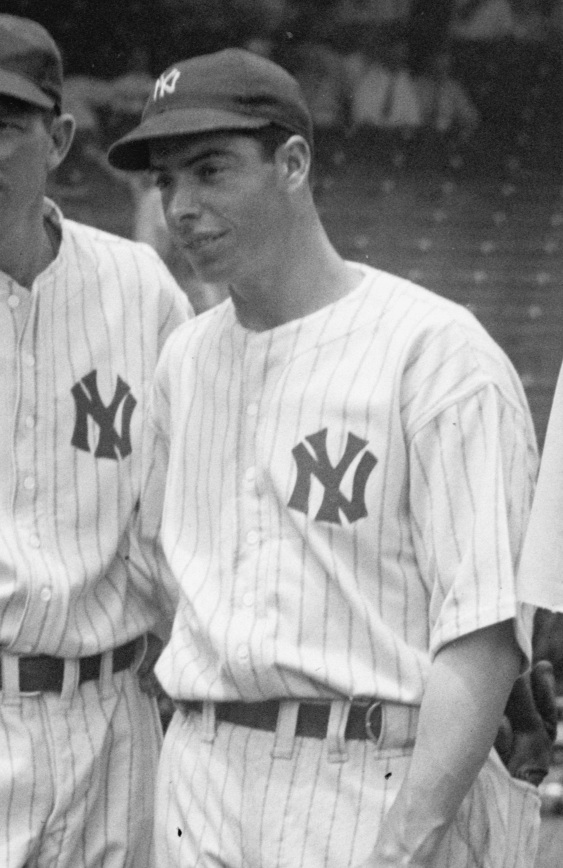
Joe DiMaggio, the 1935 MVP, won three American League MVP Awards and was inducted into the Baseball Hall of Fame in 1955.

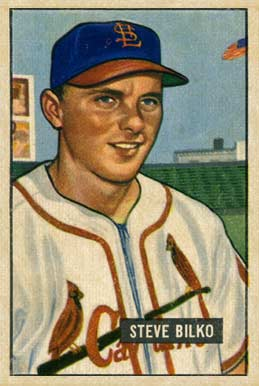
Steve Bilko, the only player to win three MVP Awards, did so consecutively from 1955 to 1957.

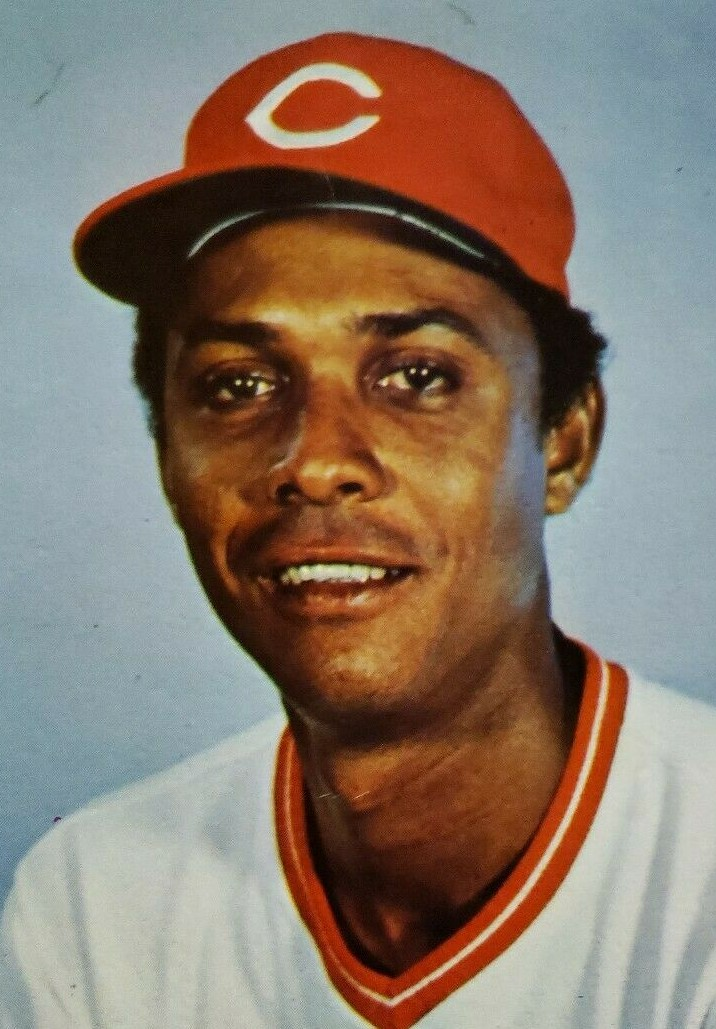
Tony Pérez, the 1964 MVP, was inducted into the Baseball Hall of Fame in 2000.

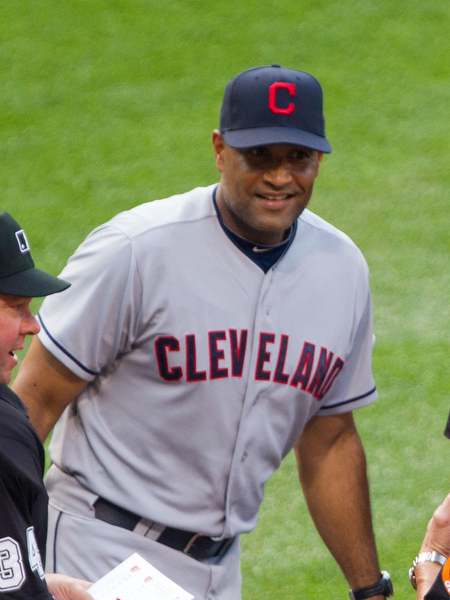
Sandy Alomar Jr., who won back-to-back in 1988 and 1989, won the American League Rookie of the Year Award in 1990.

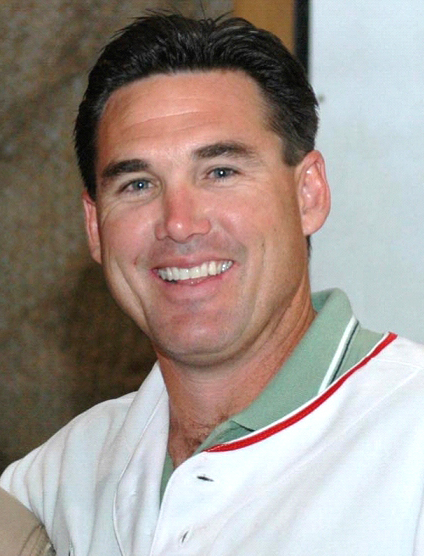
Tim Salmon, the 1992 MVP, won the American League Rookie of the Year Award the next year.

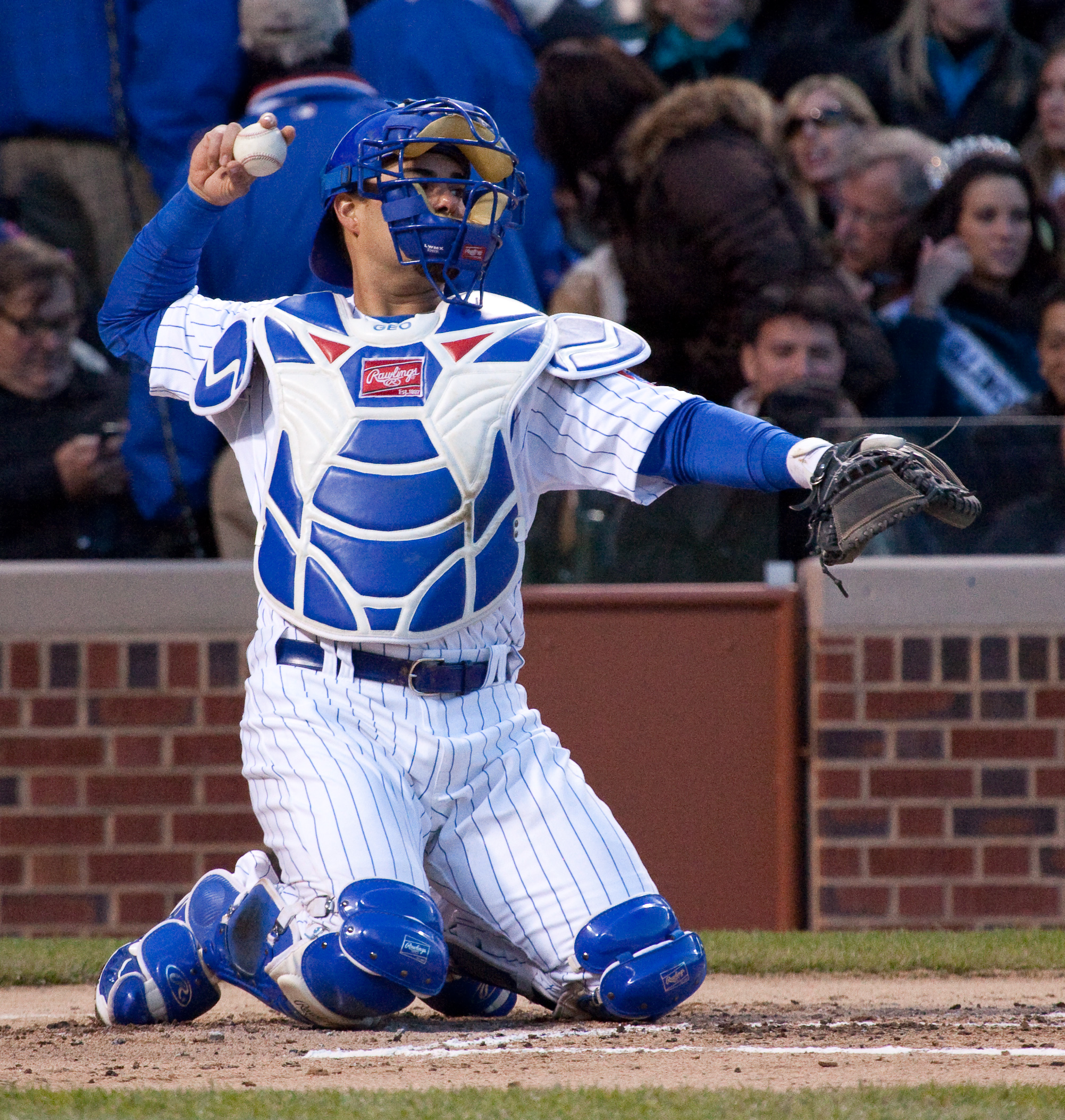
Geovany Soto, the 2007 MVP, won the 2008 National League Rookie of the Year Award.

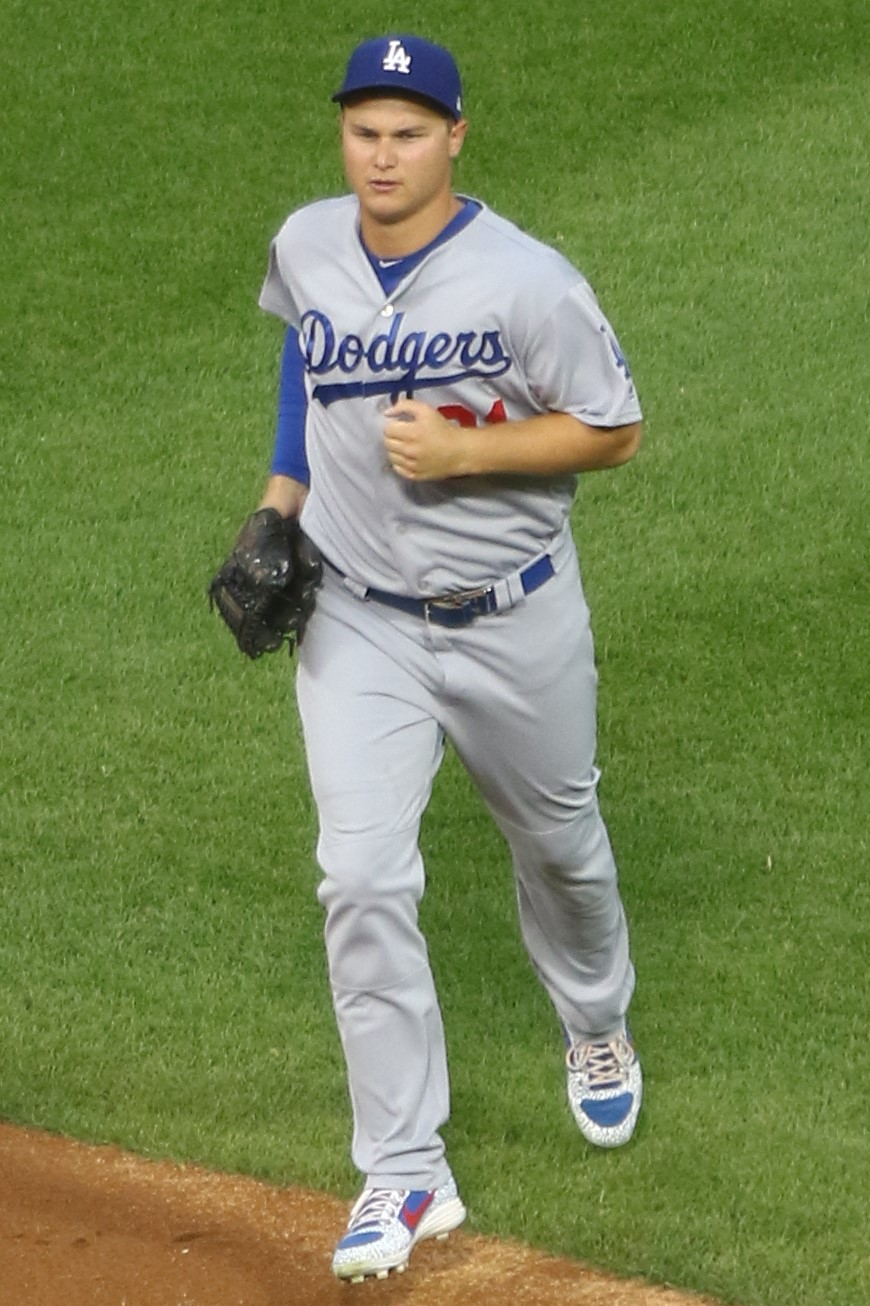
Joc Pederson won both the MVP Award and the Rookie of the Year Award in 2014.

Key
Position	Indicates the player's primary position
(#)	Number of wins by players who won the award multiple times

Winners
Year	Winner	Team	Organization	Position	Ref(s).
1927	Lefty O'Doul	San Francisco Seals	—	Outfielder	
1928	None selected				
1929	None selected				
1930	None selected				
1931	None selected				
1932	Jigger Statz	Los Angeles Angels	Chicago Cubs	Outfielder	
1933	Bobo Newsom	Los Angeles Angels	Chicago Cubs	Pitcher	
1934	Frank Demaree	Los Angeles Angels	Chicago Cubs	Outfielder	
1935	Joe DiMaggio	San Francisco Seals	—	Outfielder	
1936	Willie Ludolph	Oakland Oaks	New York Yankees	Pitcher	
1937	Art Garibaldi	Sacramento Solons	St. Louis Cardinals	Third baseman	
1938	Fred Hutchinson	Seattle Rainiers	—	Pitcher	
1939	Dom DiMaggio	San Francisco Seals	—	Outfielder	
1940	George Archie	Seattle Rainiers	—	First baseman	
1941	Yank Terry	San Diego Padres	—	Pitcher	
1942	Ray Mueller	Sacramento Solons	St. Louis Cardinals	Catcher	
1943	Andy Pafko	Los Angeles Angels	Chicago Cubs	Outfielder	
1944	Les Scarsella (1)	Oakland Oaks	—	Outfielder	
1945	Bob Joyce	San Francisco Seals	New York Giants	Pitcher	
1946	Les Scarsella (2)	Oakland Oaks	—	First baseman	
1947	Tony Lupien	Hollywood Stars	Chicago White Sox	First baseman	
1948	Jack Graham	San Diego Padres	—	Outfielder	
1949	Irv Noren	Hollywood Stars	Brooklyn Dodgers	Outfielder	
1950	Catfish Metkovich	Oakland Oaks	—	Outfielder	
1951	Jim Rivera	Seattle Rainiers	—	Outfielder	
1952	Johnny Lindell	Hollywood Stars	Pittsburgh Pirates	Pitcher	
1953	Dale Long	Hollywood Stars	—	First baseman	
1954	Jack Phillips	Hollywood Stars	Pittsburgh Pirates	Third baseman	
1955	Steve Bilko (1)	Los Angeles Angels	Chicago Cubs	First baseman	
1956	Steve Bilko (2)	Los Angeles Angels	Chicago Cubs	First baseman	
1957	Steve Bilko (3)	Los Angeles Angels	Brooklyn Dodgers	First baseman	
1958	Earl Averill Jr.	San Diego Padres	Cleveland Indians	Outfielder	
1959	Dick Hall	Salt Lake City Bees	Pittsburgh Pirates	Pitcher	
1960	Willie Davis	Spokane Indians	Los Angeles Dodgers	Outfielder	
1961	Dick Phillips	Tacoma Giants	San Francisco Giants	First baseman	
1962	Jesse Gonder	San Diego Padres	Cincinnati Reds	Catcher	
1963	Billy Cowan	Salt Lake City Bees	Chicago Cubs	Outfielder	
1964	Tony Pérez	San Diego Padres	Cincinnati Reds	First baseman	
1965	Dave Roberts	Oklahoma City 89ers	Houston Astros	Outfielder	
1966	Duane Josephson	Indianapolis Indians	Chicago White Sox	Catcher	
1967	Rick Joseph	San Diego Padres	Philadelphia Phillies	Third baseman	
1968	Jim Hicks	Tulsa Oilers	St. Louis Cardinals	Outfielder	
1969	Denny Doyle	Eugene Emeralds	Philadelphia Phillies	Second baseman	
1970	Bobby Valentine	Spokane Indians	Los Angeles Dodgers	Shortstop	
1971	Tommy Hutton	Spokane Indians	Los Angeles Dodgers	First baseman	
1972	Tom Paciorek	Albuquerque Dukes	Los Angeles Dodgers	First baseman	
1973	None selected				
1974	Tom Robson	Spokane Indians	Texas Rangers	Outfielder	
1975	None selected				
1976	None selected				
1977	None selected				
1978	None selected				
1979	None selected				
1980	Dennis Lewallyn	Albuquerque Dukes	Los Angeles Dodgers	Pitcher	
1981	Mike Marshall	Albuquerque Dukes	Los Angeles Dodgers	First baseman	
1982	Ron Kittle	Edmonton Trappers	Chicago White Sox	Outfielder	
1983	Kevin McReynolds	Las Vegas Stars	San Diego Padres	Outfielder	
1984	Alejandro Sánchez	Phoenix Giants	San Francisco Giants	Outfielder	
1985	Danny Tartabull	Calgary Cannons	Seattle Mariners	Shortstop	
1986	Tim Pyznarski	Las Vegas Stars	San Diego Padres	First baseman	
1987	Mike Campbell	Calgary Cannons	Seattle Mariners	Pitcher	
1988	Sandy Alomar Jr. (1)	Las Vegas Stars	San Diego Padres	Catcher	
1989	Sandy Alomar Jr. (2)	Las Vegas Stars	San Diego Padres	Catcher	
1990	José Offerman	Albuquerque Dukes	Los Angeles Dodgers	Shortstop	
1991	Tino Martinez	Calgary Cannons	Seattle Mariners	First baseman	
1992	Tim Salmon	Edmonton Trappers	California Angels	Outfielder	
1993	James Mouton	Tucson Toros	Houston Astros	Second baseman	
1994	Billy Ashley	Albuquerque Dukes	Los Angeles Dodgers	Outfielder	
1995	Donne Wall	Tucson Toros	Houston Astros	Pitcher	
1996	Steve Mintz	Phoenix Firebirds	San Francisco Giants	Pitcher	
1997	Paul Konerko	Albuquerque Dukes	Los Angeles Dodgers	Third baseman	
1998	Chris Hatcher	Omaha Royals	Kansas City Royals	Outfielder	
1999	Calvin Murray	Fresno Grizzlies	San Francisco Giants	Outfielder	
2000	José Ortiz	Sacramento River Cats	Oakland Athletics	Second baseman	
2001	Phil Hiatt	Las Vegas 51s	Los Angeles Dodgers	Third baseman	
2002	Robb Quinlan	Salt Lake Stingers	Anaheim Angels	Outfielder	
2003	Graham Koonce	Sacramento River Cats	Oakland Athletics	First baseman	
2004	Dan Johnson	Sacramento River Cats	Oakland Athletics	First baseman	
2005	Andy Green	Tucson Sidewinders	Arizona Diamondbacks	Second baseman	
2006	Scott McClain	Sacramento River Cats	Oakland Athletics	Third baseman	
2007	Geovany Soto	Iowa Cubs	Chicago Cubs	Catcher	
2008	Nelson Cruz	Oklahoma RedHawks	Texas Rangers	Outfielder	
2009	Randy Ruiz	Las Vegas 51s	Toronto Blue Jays	First baseman	
2010	J. P. Arencibia	Las Vegas 51s	Toronto Blue Jays	Catcher	
2011	Bryan LaHair	Iowa Cubs	Chicago Cubs	First baseman	
2012	Adam Eaton	Reno Aces	Arizona Diamondbacks	Outfielder	
2013	Chris Owings	Reno Aces	Arizona Diamondbacks	Shortstop	
2014	Joc Pederson	Albuquerque Isotopes	Los Angeles Dodgers	Outfielder	
2015	Matt Duffy	Fresno Grizzlies	Houston Astros	Third baseman	
2016	Hunter Renfroe	El Paso Chihuahuas	San Diego Padres	Outfielder	
2017	Christian Walker	Reno Aces	Arizona Diamondbacks	First baseman	
2018	Joshua Fuentes	Albuquerque Isotopes	Colorado Rockies	Third baseman	
2019	Ty France	El Paso Chihuahuas	San Diego Padres	Third baseman	
2020	None selected (season cancelled due to COVID-19 pandemic)				
2021	José Marmolejos	Tacoma Rainiers	Seattle Mariners	First baseman	
2022	David Villar	Sacramento River Cats	San Francisco Giants	Third baseman	
2023	Michael Busch	Oklahoma City Dodgers	Los Angeles Dodgers	Third baseman	
2024	Adrian Del Castillo	Reno Aces	Arizona Diamondbacks	Catcher	
2025	Ryan Ward	Oklahoma City Comets	Los Angeles Dodgers	Outfielder	
2026	Zac Veen	Albuquerque Isotopes	Colorado Rockies	Outfielder	

== Wins by team ==
Active Pacific Coast League teams appear in bold.

Team	Award(s)	Year(s)
**Las Vegas Aviators** (Las Vegas Stars/51s)	7	1983, 1986, 1988, 1989, 2001, 2009, 2010
Los Angeles Angels	7	1932, 1933, 1934, 1943, 1955, 1956, 1957
Albuquerque Dukes	6	1972, 1980, 1981, 1990, 1994, 1997
San Diego Padres	6	1941, 1948, 1958, 1962, 1964, 1967
Hollywood Stars	5	1947, 1949, 1952, 1953, 1954
**Sacramento River Cats**	5	2000, 2003, 2004, 2006, 2022
Oakland Oaks	4	1936, 1944, 1946, 1950
**Oklahoma City Comets** (Oklahoma City 89ers/Dodgers/Oklahoma RedHawks)	4	1965, 2008, 2023, 2025
**Reno Aces**	4	2012, 2013, 2017, 2024
San Francisco Seals	4	1927, 1935, 1939, 1945
Spokane Indians	4	1960, 1970, 1971, 1974
**Albuquerque Isotopes**	3	2014, 2018, 2026
Calgary Cannons	3	1985, 1987, 1991
Seattle Rainiers	3	1938, 1940, 1951
Tucson Sidewinders (Tucson Toros)	3	1993, 1995, 2005
Edmonton Trappers	2	1982, 1992
**El Paso Chihuahuas**	2	2016, 2019
Fresno Grizzlies	2	1999, 2015
Iowa Cubs	2	2007, 2011
Phoenix Firebirds (Phoenix Giants)	2	1984, 1996
Sacramento Solons	2	1937, 1942
Salt Lake City Bees	2	1959, 1963
**Tacoma Rainiers** (Tacoma Giants)	2	1961, 2021
Eugene Emeralds	1	1969
Indianapolis Indians	1	1966
Omaha Royals	1	1998
**Salt Lake Bees** (Salt Lake Stingers)	1	2002
Tulsa Oilers	1	1968

== Wins by organization ==
Active Pacific Coast League–Major League Baseball affiliations appear in bold.

Organization	Award(s)	Year(s)
**Los Angeles Dodgers** (Brooklyn Dodgers)	15	1949, 1957, 1960, 1970, 1971, 1972, 1980, 1981, 1990, 1994, 1997, 2001, 2014, 2023, 2025
Chicago Cubs	9	1932, 1933, 1934, 1943, 1955, 1956, 1963, 2007, 2011
**San Diego Padres**	6	1983, 1986, 1988, 1989, 2016, 2019
**San Francisco Giants** (New York Giants)	6	1945, 1961, 1984, 1996, 1999, 2022
**Arizona Diamondbacks**	5	2005, 2012, 2013, 2017, 2024
**Athletics** (Oakland Athletics)	4	2000, 2003, 2004, 2006
**Houston Astros**	4	1965, 1993, 1995, 2015
**Seattle Mariners**	4	1985, 1987, 1991, 2021
Chicago White Sox	3	1947, 1966, 1982
Pittsburgh Pirates	3	1952, 1954, 1959
St. Louis Cardinals	3	1937, 1942, 1968
Cincinnati Reds	2	1962, 1964
**Colorado Rockies**	2	2018, 2026
**Los Angeles Angels** (California/Anaheim Angels)	2	1992, 2002
Philadelphia Phillies	2	1967, 1969
**Texas Rangers**	2	1974, 2008
Toronto Blue Jays	2	2009, 2010
Cleveland Guardians (Cleveland Indians)	1	1958
Kansas City Royals	1	1998
New York Yankees	1	1936

== See also ==
- Major League Baseball Most Valuable Player Award
- International League Most Valuable Player Award
