= Pacific Coast League Top MLB Prospect Award =

- Sport: Baseball
- League: Pacific Coast League
- Awarded for: Best regular-season rookie in the Pacific Coast League
- Country: United States; Canada
- Presented by: Pacific Coast League

History
- First award: Carlos Bernier (1952)
- Most recent: Charlie Condon (2026)

The Pacific Coast League Top MLB Prospect Award is an annual award given to the best rookie player in Minor League Baseball's Pacific Coast League based on their regular-season performance as voted on by league managers. Broadcasters, Minor League Baseball executives, and members of the media have previously voted as well. Though the league was established in 1903, the award was not created until 1952, as the Rookie of the Year Award. It was abandoned from 1973 to 1997 before being revived in 1998. After the cancellation of the 2020 season, the league was known as the Triple-A West in 2021 before reverting to the Pacific Coast League name in 2022. The Top MLB Prospect Award began to be issued instead of the Rookie of the Year Award in 2021.

Nineteen outfielders have won the award, the most of any position. Third basemen, with seven winners, have won the most among infielders, followed by first basemen (7), second basemen (6), and shortstops (5). Five pitchers and one catcher have won the award.

Ten players who have won the Top MLB Prospect Award also won the Pacific Coast League Most Valuable Player Award in the same season: Willie Davis (1960), Billy Cowan (1963), Denny Doyle (1969), Robb Quinlan (2002), Adam Eaton (2012), Chris Owings (2013), Joc Pederson (2014), Joshua Fuentes (2018), Ty France (2019), and Michael Busch. Félix Hernández (2005) is the only player to win both Rookie of the Year and the league's Pitcher of the Year Award in the same season.

Four players from the Hollywood Stars, Reno Aces, and Salt Lake Bees have each been selected for the Top MLB Prospect Award, more than any other teams in the league, followed by the Albuquerque Isotopes, El Paso Chihuahuas, and Tacoma Rainiers (3); the Eugene Emeralds, Denver Bears, Oklahoma City Comets, Omaha Storm Chasers, Portland Beavers, Salt Lake City Bees, San Diego Padres, Spokane Indians, and Vancouver Mounties (2); and the Arkansas Travelers, Calgary Cannons, Colorado Springs Sky Sox, Hawaii Islanders, Los Angeles Angels, Las Vegas Aviators, New Orleans Zephyrs, Phoenix Giants, Sacramento River Cats, Seattle Rainiers, and Tucson Sidewinders (1).

Six players from the Los Angeles Angels Major League Baseball (MLB) organization have won the award, more than any other, followed by the Arizona Diamondbacks and Los Angeles Dodgers organizations (5); the San Diego Padres organization (4); the Cincinnati Reds, Colorado Rockies, Philadelphia Phillies, Pittsburgh Pirates, and Seattle Mariners organizations (3); the Chicago Cubs, Kansas City Royals, and Minnesota Twins organizations (2); and the Athletics, Atlanta Braves, Baltimore Orioles, Cleveland Guardians, Houston Astros, Miami Marlins, New York Mets, and San Francisco Giants organizations (1).

== Winners ==
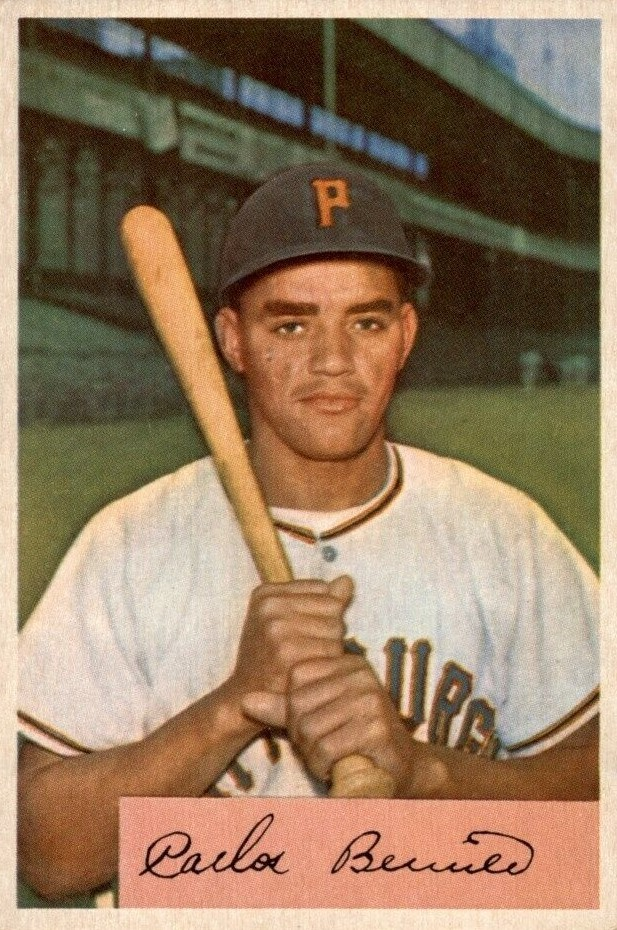
Carlos Bernier won the first Rookie of the Year Award in 1952.

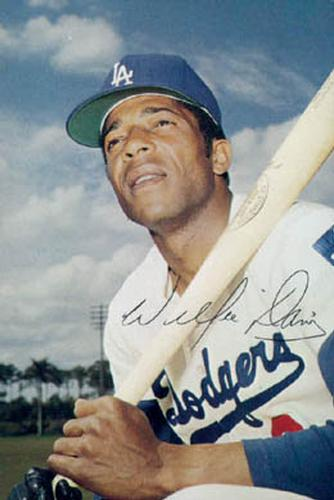
Willie Davis was the first to win Rookie of the Year and the MVP Award in the same season (1960).

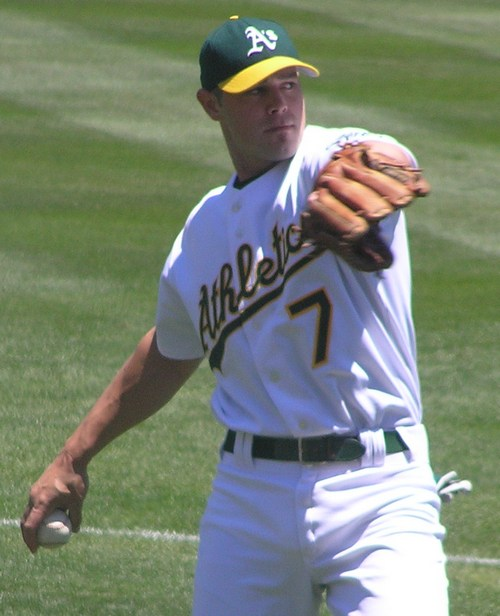
Bobby Crosby, the 2003 winner, won the American League Rookie of the Year Award the next year.

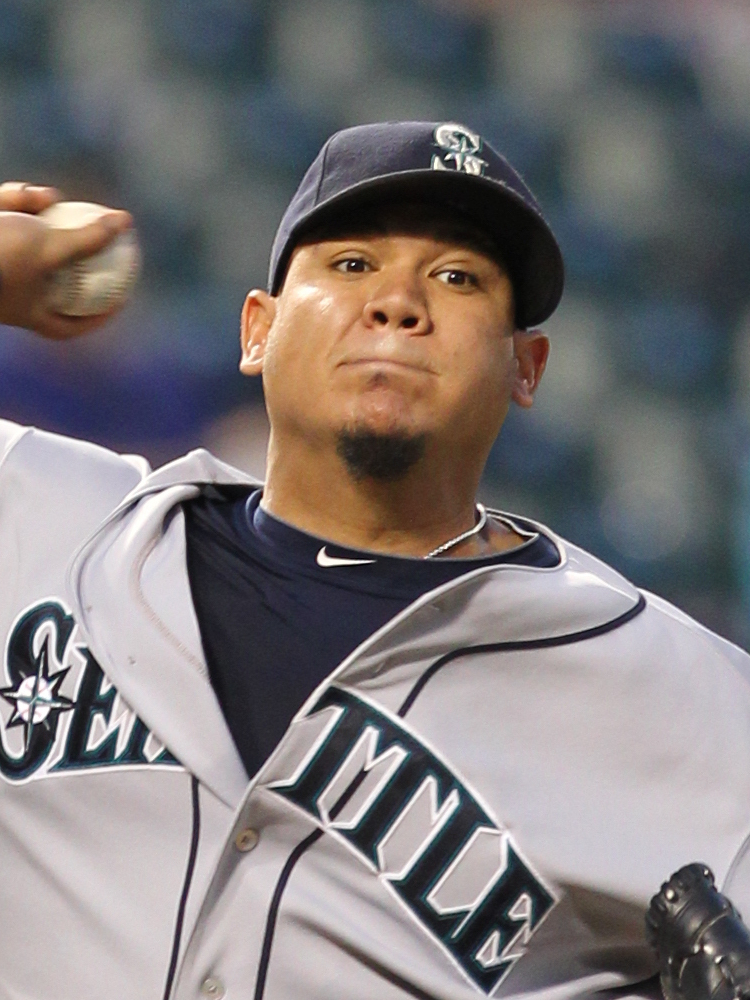
Félix Hernández is the only player to win Rookie and Pitcher of the Year in the same year (2005).

Key
Position	Indicates the player's primary position
^	Indicates multiple award winners in the same year

Winners
Year	Winner	Team	Organization	Position	Ref(s).
1952	Carlos Bernier	Hollywood Stars	Pittsburgh Pirates	Outfielder	
1953	George O'Donnell	Hollywood Stars	—	Pitcher	
1954	Lino Donoso	Hollywood Stars	Pittsburgh Pirates	Pitcher	
1955	Bob Garber	Hollywood Stars	Pittsburgh Pirates	Pitcher	
1956	Bob Anderson	Los Angeles Angels	Chicago Cubs	Pitcher	
1957	Lenny Green	Vancouver Mounties	Baltimore Orioles	Outfielder	
1958	Vada Pinson	Seattle Rainiers	Cincinnati Redlegs	Outfielder	
1959	Tommy Davis	Spokane Indians	Los Angeles Dodgers	Outfielder	
1960	Willie Davis	Spokane Indians	Los Angeles Dodgers	Outfielder	
1961	Denis Menke	Vancouver Mounties	Milwaukee Braves	Shortstop	
1962	Tommy Harper	San Diego Padres	Cincinnati Reds	Third baseman	
1963	Billy Cowan	Salt Lake City Bees	Chicago Cubs	Outfielder	
1964	Costen Shockley	Arkansas Travelers	Philadelphia Phillies	First baseman	
1965^	Bill Davis	Portland Beavers	Cleveland Indians	First baseman	
1965^	Lee May	San Diego Padres	Cincinnati Reds	First baseman	
1966	Rich Reese	Denver Bears	Minnesota Twins	Outfielder	
1967	César Gutiérrez	Phoenix Giants	San Francisco Giants	Shortstop	
1968	Graig Nettles	Denver Bears	Minnesota Twins	Third baseman	
1969	Denny Doyle	Eugene Emeralds	Philadelphia Phillies	Second baseman	
1970	Doug Griffin	Hawaii Islanders	California Angels	Second baseman	
1971	Mike Anderson	Eugene Emeralds	Philadelphia Phillies	Outfielder	
1972	Doug Howard	Salt Lake City Angels	California Angels	Outfielder	
1973–1997: None selected					
1998	Jeremy Giambi	Omaha Royals	Kansas City Royals	Outfielder	
1999	Mark Quinn	Omaha Golden Spikes	Kansas City Royals	Outfielder	
2000	Nate Rolison	Calgary Cannons	Florida Marlins	First baseman	
2001	Sean Burroughs	Portland Beavers	San Diego Padres	Third baseman	
2002	Robb Quinlan	Salt Lake Stingers	Anaheim Angels	Outfielder	
2003	Bobby Crosby	Sacramento River Cats	Oakland Athletics	Shortstop	
2004	Chris Burke	New Orleans Zephyrs	Houston Astros	Second baseman	
2005	Félix Hernández	Tacoma Rainiers	Seattle Mariners	Pitcher	
2006	Howie Kendrick	Salt Lake Bees	Los Angeles Angels of Anaheim	Second baseman	
2007	Wladimir Balentien	Tacoma Rainiers	Seattle Mariners	Outfielder	
2008	Josh Whitesell	Tucson Sidewinders	Arizona Diamondbacks	First baseman	
2009	Eric Young Jr.	Colorado Springs Sky Sox	Colorado Rockies	Second baseman	
2010	Peter Bourjos	Salt Lake Bees	Los Angeles Angels of Anaheim	Outfielder	
2011	Collin Cowgill	Reno Aces	Arizona Diamondbacks	Outfielder	
2012	Adam Eaton	Reno Aces	Arizona Diamondbacks	Outfielder	
2013	Chris Owings	Reno Aces	Arizona Diamondbacks	Shortstop	
2014	Joc Pederson	Albuquerque Isotopes	Los Angeles Dodgers	Outfielder	
2015	Alex Dickerson	El Paso Chihuahuas	San Diego Padres	Outfielder	
2016	Carlos Asuaje	El Paso Chihuahuas	San Diego Padres	Second baseman	
2017	Amed Rosario	Las Vegas 51s	New York Mets	Shortstop	
2018	Joshua Fuentes	Albuquerque Isotopes	Colorado Rockies	Third baseman	
2019	Ty France	El Paso Chihuahuas	San Diego Padres	Third baseman	
2020: None selected (season cancelled due to COVID-19 pandemic)					
2021	Jo Adell	Salt Lake Bees	Los Angeles Angels	Outfielder	
2022	Miguel Vargas	Oklahoma City Dodgers	Los Angeles Dodgers	Third baseman	
2023	Michael Busch	Oklahoma City Dodgers	Los Angeles Dodgers	Third baseman	
2024	Deyvison De Los Santos	Reno Aces	Arizona Diamondbacks	First baseman	
2025	Harry Ford	Tacoma Rainiers	Seattle Mariners	Catcher	
2026	Charlie Condon	Albuquerque Isotopes	Colorado Rockies	First baseman	

== Wins by team ==
Active Pacific Coast League teams appear in bold.

Team	Award(s)	Year(s)
Hollywood Stars	4	1952, 1953, 1954, 1955
**Reno Aces**	4	2011, 2012, 2013, 2024
**Salt Lake Bees** (Salt Lake Stingers)	4	2002, 2006, 2010, 2021
**Albuquerque Isotopes**	3	2014, 2018, 2026
**El Paso Chihuahuas**	3	2015, 2016, 2019
**Tacoma Rainiers**	3	2005, 2007, 2025
Denver Bears	2	1966, 1968
Eugene Emeralds	2	1969, 1971
**Oklahoma City Comets** (Oklahoma City Dodgers)	2	2022, 2023
Omaha Storm Chasers (Omaha Royals/Golden Spikes)	2	1998, 1999
Portland Beavers	2	1965, 2001
Salt Lake City Bees (Salt Lake City Angels)	2	1963, 1972
San Diego Padres	2	1962, 1965
Spokane Indians	2	1959, 1960
Vancouver Mounties	2	1957, 1961
Arkansas Travelers	1	1964
Calgary Cannons	1	2000
Colorado Springs Sky Sox	1	2009
Hawaii Islanders	1	1970
**Las Vegas Aviators** (Las Vegas 51s)	1	2017
Los Angeles Angels	1	1956
New Orleans Zephyrs	1	2004
Phoenix Giants	1	1967
**Sacramento River Cats**	1	2003
Seattle Rainiers	1	1958
Tucson Sidewinders	1	2008

== Wins by organization ==
Active Pacific Coast League–Major League Baseball affiliations appear in bold.

Organization	Award(s)	Year(s)
**Los Angeles Angels** (California/Anaheim Angels)	6	1970, 1972, 2002, 2006, 2010, 2021
**Arizona Diamondbacks**	5	2008, 2011, 2012, 2013, 2024
**Los Angeles Dodgers**	5	1959, 1960, 2014, 2022, 2023
**San Diego Padres**	4	2001, 2015, 2016, 2019
Cincinnati Reds (Cincinnati Redlegs)	3	1958, 1962, 1965
**Colorado Rockies**	3	2009, 2018, 2026
Philadelphia Phillies	3	1964, 1969, 1971
Pittsburgh Pirates	3	1952, 1954, 1955
**Seattle Mariners**	3	2005, 2007, 2025
Chicago Cubs	2	1956, 1963
Kansas City Royals	2	1998, 1999
Minnesota Twins	2	1966, 1968
**Athletics** (Oakland Athletics)	1	2003
Atlanta Braves (Milwaukee Braves)	1	1961
Baltimore Orioles	1	1957
Cleveland Guardians (Cleveland Indians)	1	1965
**Houston Astros**	1	2004
Miami Marlins (Florida Marlins)	1	2000
New York Mets	1	2017
**San Francisco Giants**	1	1967
