= Deyvison De Los Santos =

Dominican baseball player (born 2003)

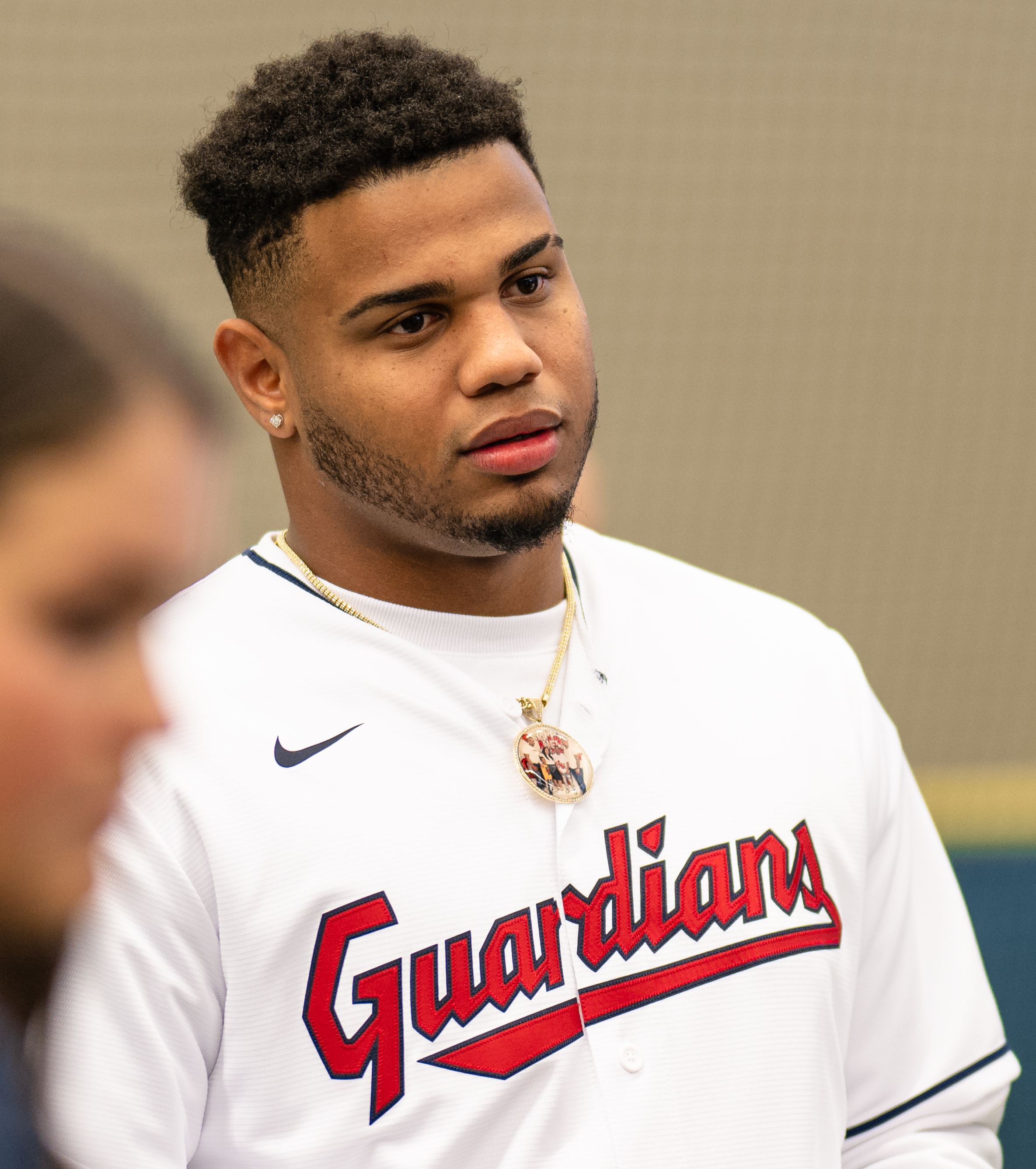
- De Los Santos with the Cleveland Guardians in 2024

Miami Marlins – No. 63
- First baseman / Third baseman
- Born: June 21, 2003 (age 23); Santo Domingo, Dominican Republic
- Bats: Right Throws: Right

MLB debut
- March 29, 2026, for the Miami Marlins

MLB statistics (through 2026 season)
- Batting average: .143
- Home runs: 0
- Runs batted in: 0
- Stats at Baseball Reference

Teams
- Miami Marlins (2026–present)

Deyvison De Los Santos (born June 21, 2003) is a Dominican professional baseball first baseman and third baseman for the Miami Marlins of Major League Baseball (MLB). He made his MLB debut in 2026.

== Career ==
=== Arizona Diamondbacks ===
De Los Santos was born and grew up in Santo Domingo, Dominican Republic. He played for the Dominican Republic national team in the 2018 U-15 Baseball World Cup. De Los Santos was signed by the Arizona Diamondbacks for a $200,000 signing bonus on July 2, 2019. He did not play in a game in 2020 due to the cancellation of the minor league season because of the COVID-19 pandemic. De Los Santos made his professional debut in 2021 with the Rookie-level Arizona Complex League Diamondbacks, where he batted .329 with five home runs in 25 games before being promoted to the Low-A Visalia Rawhide, with whom he batted .276 with three home runs in 37 games.

De Los Santos returned to Visalia at the start of the 2022 season. De Los Santos batted .329 in 78 games for the Rawhide playing primarily third base, before being promoted to the High-A Hillsboro Hops, for whom he batted .279. He was promoted a second time to the Amarillo Sod Poodles of the Double-A Texas League for the final two weeks of the season, for whom he batted .231. He was selected to play in the Arizona Fall League for the Salt River Rafters after the season, for whom he batted .219/.286/.328.

In 2023, De Los Santos played for Amarillo, batting .254/.297/.431 in 452 at bats, playing primarily third base.

On December 6, 2023, De Los Santos was selected by the Cleveland Guardians in the major league phase of the Rule 5 draft and added to their 40-man roster. He was returned to the Diamondbacks on March 23, 2024, after failing to make Cleveland's opening day roster. In 87 games split between Amarillo and the Triple-A Reno Aces, he accumulated a .325/.376/.635 batting line with 28 home runs and 84 RBI.

=== Miami Marlins ===
On July 25, 2024, the Diamondbacks traded De Los Santos and Andrew Pintar to the Miami Marlins in exchange for A. J. Puk. In 50 games for the Triple-A Jacksonville Jumbo Shrimp, he slashed .240/.284/.459 with 12 home runs and 36 RBI. De Los Santos won the 2024 Pacific Coast League Top MLB Prospect Award. On November 20, 2024, the Marlins added De Los Santos to their 40-man roster to protect him from the Rule 5 draft.

Following the 2024 season, De Los Santos played winter league baseball for the Gigantes del Cibao of the Dominican Professional Baseball League. De Los Santos was optioned to Triple-A Jacksonville to begin the 2025 season. In 107 appearances for the Jumbo Shrimp, he batted .241/.311/.363 with 12 home runs, 54 RBI, and 16 stolen bases.

De Los Santos was optioned to Triple-A Jacksonville to begin the 2026 season. On March 27, 2026, the Marlins promoted him to the major leagues for the first time following an injury to Christopher Morel.

== See also ==
- Rule 5 draft results
