= Josh Whitesell =

American baseball player (born 1982)

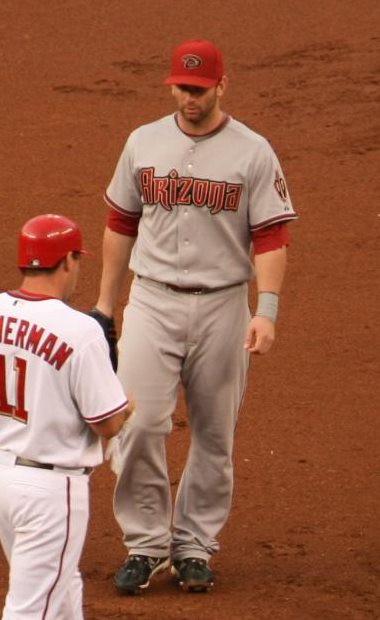
- Whitesell with the Arizona Diamondbacks
- First baseman
- Born: April 14, 1982 (age 44); Durham, North Carolina, U.S.
- Batted: Left Threw: Left

Professional debut
- MLB: September 2, 2008, for the Arizona Diamondbacks
- NPB: June 26, 2010, for the Tokyo Yakult Swallows

Last appearance
- MLB: August 20, 2009, for the Arizona Diamondbacks
- NPB: May 5, 2013, for the Chiba Lotte Marines

MLB statistics
- Batting average: .200
- Home runs: 2
- Runs batted in: 15
- Stats at Baseball Reference

Teams
- Arizona Diamondbacks (2008–2009); Tokyo Yakult Swallows (2010–2011); Chiba Lotte Marines (2012–2013)

Joshua Seth Whitesell (born April 14, 1982) is an American former professional baseball first baseman who played in Major League Baseball (MLB) for the Arizona Diamondbacks and in Nippon Professional Baseball (NPB) for the Tokyo Yakult Swallows and Chiba Lotte Marines.

In the minor leagues, Whitesell was a Carolina League mid-season All Star in 2005, and an Eastern League mid-season All-Star team in 2007. In 2008, Whitesell was voted the Diamondbacks' 2008 Minor League Player of the Year, a Baseball America Triple-A All Star, and the Pacific Coast League Rookie of the Year. Baseball America also ranked him the best power hitter in the organization, and as having the best strike zone discipline in the organization.

Whitesell played for the Arizona Diamondbacks in Major League Baseball for parts of 2008 and 2009. He played in the Washington Nationals organization for part of 2010, and played in the Japanese League for four years from 2010 to 2013.

== Heritage and early life ==
Whitesell is Jewish. He attended Rialto High School in Rialto, California, and pitched and played first base for the school's Rialto Knights, with teammate Ricky Nolasco. He was chosen to the first team All-Citrus Belt League and All-San Bernardino County in his sophomore and junior years.

In his senior year he had an 8–2 record, 1.74 ERA, and a .520 batting average. He was named 1st-team All-CIF Division I and 1st-team All-Citrus Belt League, and to the San Bernardino County North and CBCA (California Baseball Coaches' Association) Southern California All-Star teams. He played for US Team in the Goodwill Games against Japan, and was named by the San Bernardino Sun as San Bernardino County Player of the Year. He graduated in 2000 with a 4.2 grade point average (2nd in his class of 685), and was class salutatorian.

== Baseball career ==
=== College (2001–03) ===
Whitesell played baseball for the Loyola Marymount University Lions (after having been recruited by California, UCLA, San Diego, Nevada, and Pepperdine), initially as a pitcher, from 2001 to 2003. While in his freshman year, he tore his shoulder while running bases, requiring surgery. Before that he had thrown 90–91 mph, but after surgery he threw about 84 mph.

Whitesell was named to the second team All-West Coast Conference in 2003, his junior (and final) year. In 162 at bats, he batted .340 with 41 runs scored, 19 doubles, 15 home runs and 47 RBIs. He had a .471 on-base percentage and .736 slugging percentage. He earned the league's Player of the Month award for February.

Whitesell, an engineering major, consistently earned a 4.0 GPA, and won the Principal's Award for achievement in scholarship and service and Superintendent's Award for academic excellence.

=== Minor leagues ===
Whitesell was drafted out of college in the 6th round of the 2003 Major League Baseball draft by the Montreal Expos.

Whitesell was voted a Carolina League mid-season All Star while playing for the Potomac Nationals in 2005, for whom he batted .293/.416/.524, and was voted the Eastern League player-of-the-week on July 23, 2006.

==== 2007 ====
In 2007, Whitesell played for the Harrisburg Senators, the Double-A affiliate of the Washington Nationals. He hit .284/.425/.512 with 78 runs, 23 doubles, 21 homers, and 74 RBIs in 119 games. He was named to the Eastern League mid-season All-Star team, and the Nationals signed him to a contract.

==== 2008 ====
On March 15, 2008, Whitesell was claimed off waivers by the Arizona Diamondbacks, and assigned to Triple-A Tucson.

Whitesell had hitting streaks of 16 games (July 23 – August 9) and 19 games (June 27 – July 18) in his 2008 season with Tucson. He had a season-high 7 RBIs on May 23 vs. Sacramento.

In 2008 his 110 RBIs broke Lyle Overbay's team record from 2002, and was the fourth-most in the minors. He batted .328, with a .425 on-base percentage and 26 home runs. He had 86 runs scored and 36 doubles in 127 games. He finished the PCL season ranked 2nd in RBIs, tied for 4th in hits, and 7th in batting average. Whitesell had the most home runs and RBIs in the Diamondbacks system, was 2nd in on-base percentage and slugging percentage (.568), and was 3rd in batting average, OPS (.993), runs scored, hits (156), and doubles.

Whitesell was voted the Diamondbacks' 2008 Minor League Player of the Year, the MLB.com pick as the Diamondbacks' player of the year, a Baseball America Triple-A All Star, and the Pacific Coast League Rookie of the Year. Baseball America also ranked him the best power hitter in the organization, and as having the best strike zone discipline in the organization.

==== 2009 ====
Playing for the Reno Aces in 2009, through May 5 (when he was brought up to the Diamondbacks), Whitesell was 2nd in the Pacific Coast League in on-base percentage (.477) and walks (20), 5th in batting average (.356) and hits (31), 6th in OPS (1.028), 8th in RBIs (20), and hitting for a .552 slugging percentage.

Through 2009, Whitesell had hit 113 home runs with a .394 on-base percentage and a .492 slugging percentage in seven minor-league seasons.

==== 2010 ====
Whitesell played part of the 2010 season with the Nationals' AAA team, the Syracuse Chiefs, batting .304/.406/.446 in 184 at-bats, before signing with Tokyo Yakult Swallows.

=== Major leagues ===
==== Arizona Diamondbacks (2008–09) ====
2008

Whitesell made his major league debut on September 2, 2008. He collected his first major league hit, a single, against the San Francisco Giants on September 15, during his first start. Whitesell hit his first home run on September 21, against Colorado Rockies pitcher Steven Register.

2009

In December 2008, Whitesell appeared to be one of the top two candidates for the spot of top left-handed pinch hitter off the bench and reserve first baseman for the 2009 season.

In January 2009 FanGraphs writer Marc Hulet took the Diamondbacks to task for bringing back "aging pinch hitter Tony Clark", despite his 2008 line of .225/.359/.318, saying "it's quite possible that Clark will continue to struggle in 2009. His line against right-handed pitchers was just .198/.354/.248, which makes him almost useless against them if this was not simply a one-year fluke." He added, referring to Whitesell, "What makes matters worse is that the organization has some in-house talent that could possibly provide the same production – if not more – for half the salary.... Whitesell ... has more upside and creamed right-handed pitchers in 2008 at Triple-A to the tune of .342/.442/.602 in 342 at-bats. Whitesell ... did well in 2008 with runners in scoring position by hitting .331/.438/.586. Truth be told, there are not many – if any – unimpressive numbers in Whitesell's statistics from 2008. He deserves a shot, and Arizona could certainly benefit from replacing Clark with the youngster and allowing Whitesell to get his feet wet as a pinch hitter while also playing regularly at first base against right-handed pitching."

In February 2009, Diamondback President and CEO Derrick Hall, when asked whether Whitesell would be given a shot to make the major league team out of spring training, responded: "He sure will. He has so much raw power, it is fun watching him hit. He is a talented kid who catches a lot of coaches' and scouts' eyes." In late March, Manager Bob Melvin's assessment of him was: "The offense is legitimate."

In spring training, Whitesell led the team in on-base percentage (.429; best of all hitters with 30 or more at bats), tied for the team lead in home runs (3) and walks (11; despite receiving only the 11th-most at bats on the team), was second in runs (12), and tied for second in RBIs (12), while batting .308 with a .519 slugging percentage. During the last weekend before the season began, however, he was told that he had not made the team's opening day roster. "He had a great camp" said Melvin. "He's certainly a guy we wouldn't hesitate to (call up) if we did have an injury or something along those lines."

On May 6, Whitesell was called back up to the Diamondbacks, after hitting .356 for the Reno Aces with a .477 on-base percentage (2nd in the PCL) and a .552 slugging percentage. He took the place of Tony Clark, who was placed on the 15-day disabled list. Melvin said Whitesell would get a chance to play every day. On May 19, however, not even two weeks later, Melvin had been fired as manager and the team optioned Whitesell back to Reno.

On May 30, Whitesell was back with the team, and new Manager A. J. Hinch said Whitesell would start the following day and will get a "good, long look" the next couple of weeks at first base. Hinch said: "Really the only thing [Whitesell] hasn't conquered is the major-league side of it, because every time he goes down to Triple-A he performs very well". Despite batting .300 with a .447 on-base percentage in his second stint with the team, Whitesell was optioned back to Reno on June 19 when Tony Clark came off the disabled list and returned to Arizona (after a rehab assignment at Reno in which he batted .160, and during which he turned 37).

Clark was finally released in mid-July, and Whitesell was called back up for the third time in the season to replace him on July 16. Asked what he had been told by Diamondbacks management, Whitesell responded: "I just know that ... the first base job for 2010 is up for the taking, so I'm going to get a fair opportunity." He added that his game plan was to try to "relax and let the game come to me, as opposed to trying to do too much, and let your mind take you six different ways at once — where you just relax, and know it's the same game you've been playing the whole time, the game will come to you, and success will come."

Hinch said he expected Whitesell to be more comfortable at the plate now that he had had some experience at the Major League level, recalling that the first time Whitesell was up: "I'd joke with him about squeezing the sawdust out of the bat every time he got up to bat, he was so intense on making a difference. The second time [he was called up] he was a lot more relaxed." Hinch added, "We're excited to have Whitesell, obviously. He's done everything that he's needed to do in Triple-A. He's contributed a little bit when he got the opportunity here in the big leagues." Hinch spoke with Whitesell and Chad Tracy on July 17 and told them that Whitesell would get the bulk of the action at first base, starting four or five times a week "for the time being". He did not get the bulk of the playing time at first base, however, and was sent back to Reno in late August.

The Diamondbacks declined to tender Whitesell a contract on December 13, 2009, making him a free agent.

==== Washington Nationals (2010) ====
On December 28, 2009, Whitesell signed a minor league deal with the Washington Nationals. He also received an invitation to spring training. The signing represented a return to his original organization: Whitesell was drafted in the sixth round of the 2003 draft by the Montreal Expos, who would later become the Nationals. He played part of the 2010 season with the Nationals' "AAA" squad, the Syracuse Chiefs.

==== Japanese League (2010–13) ====
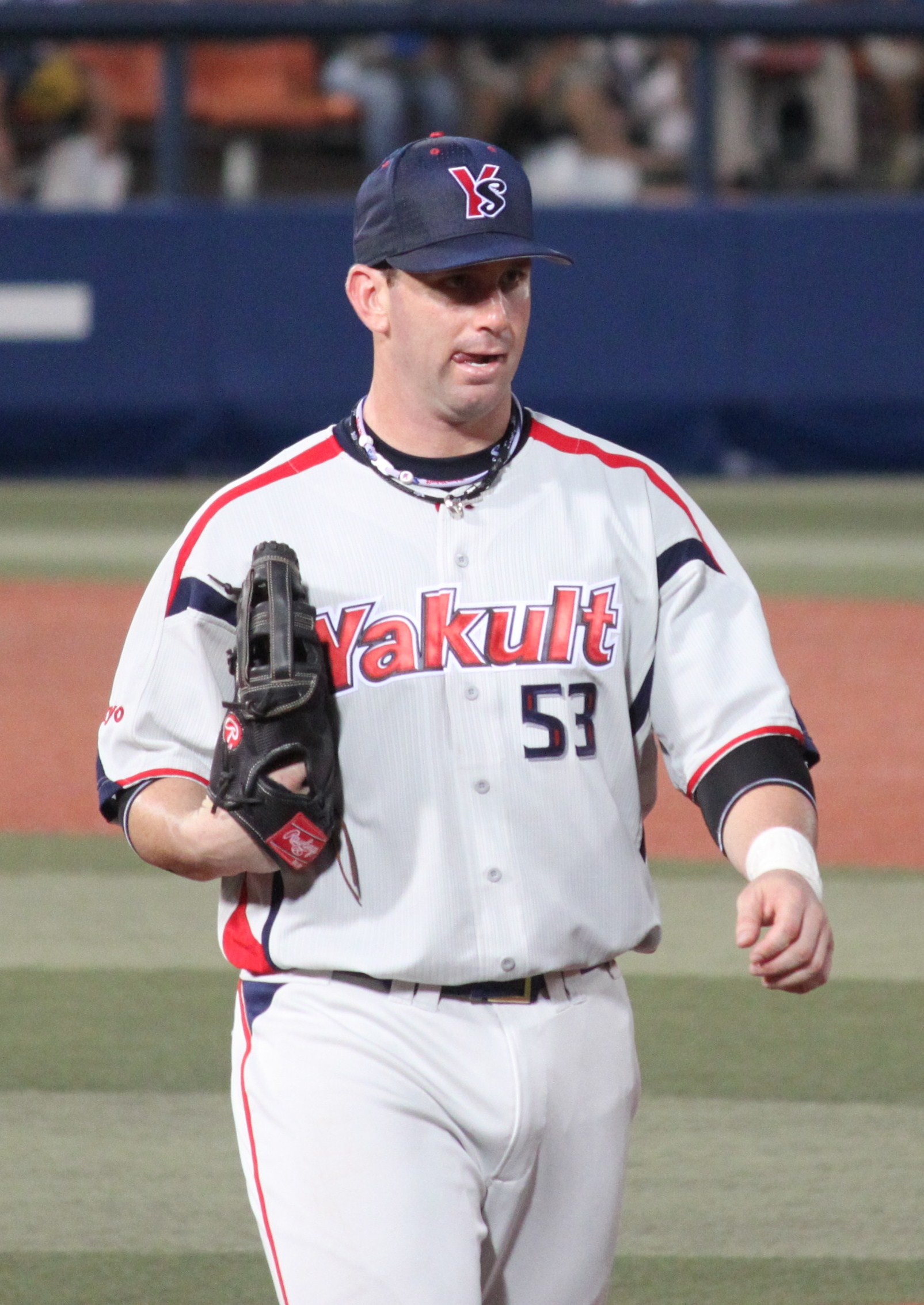
Whitesell, with the Tokyo Yakult Swallows, at Yokohama Stadium, in 2010

On June 7, 2010, Whitesell was acquired from Washington by the Tokyo Yakult Swallows, and signed for 30 million yen (roughly $327,000) for the remainder of the season. His early results were impressive. Through Aug. 22, 2010, he was batting .324 with 10 HRs and 34 RBIs in just 136 atbats. In addition, Whitesell was leading the Swallows in on-base percentage (.436), slugging percentage (.647), and on-base plus slugging (1.083). His rate of one HR per 13.6 at-bats was the club's best. And despite having no experience with the larger Japanese strike zone, few teammates were walking more often than Whitesell. He batted .309 for the season, with 15 home runs and a .399 on-base percentage and a .591 slugging percentage.

He played for the Swallows in 2011 as well, under a contract paying him 90 million yen plus incentives.

On December 28, 2011, Whitesell signed with the Chiba Lotte Marines. In 2012 for the team, he batted .309 again.

In the winter of 2013, he played with the Estrellas de Oriente in the Dominican Winter League.

=== Mexican League ===
==== Saraperos de Saltillo (2014) ====
In 2014, he played for Saraperos de Saltillo of the Mexican League.

== See also ==
- List of Jewish Major League Baseball players
