= Joc Pederson =

American baseball player (born 1992)

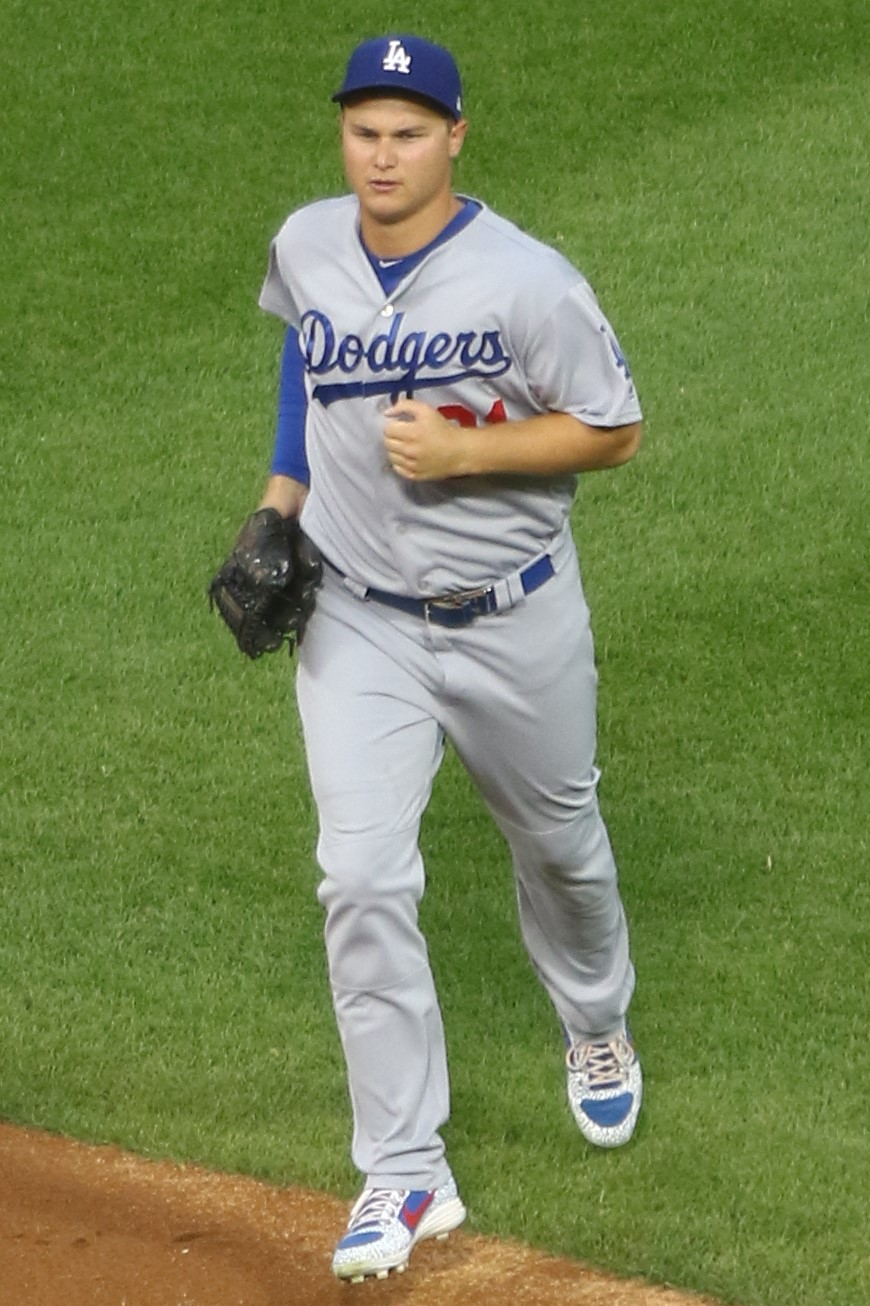
- Pederson with the Los Angeles Dodgers in 2017

Free agent
- Outfielder / Designated hitter / First baseman
- Born: April 21, 1992 (age 34); Palo Alto, California, U.S.
- Bats: Left Throws: Left

MLB debut
- September 1, 2014, for the Los Angeles Dodgers

MLB statistics (through 2026 season)
- Batting average: .236
- Home runs: 244
- Runs batted in: 628
- Stats at Baseball Reference

Teams
- Los Angeles Dodgers (2014–2020); Chicago Cubs (2021); Atlanta Braves (2021); San Francisco Giants (2022–2023); Arizona Diamondbacks (2024); Texas Rangers (2025–2026)

Career highlights and awards
- 2× World Series champion (2020, 2021); 2× All-Star (2015, 2022)

Joc Russell Pederson (/ˈpiːdərsən/ PEE-dər-sən; born April 21, 1992) is an American professional baseball outfielder and first baseman who is a free agent. He has played in Major League Baseball (MLB) for the Los Angeles Dodgers, Chicago Cubs, Atlanta Braves, San Francisco Giants, Arizona Diamondbacks, and Texas Rangers. He is a two-time World Series champion and a two-time All-Star.

The son of former MLB player Stu Pederson, Joc was drafted by the Dodgers in the 11th round of the 2010 MLB draft out of Palo Alto High School. By virtue of his Jewish heritage, he played for the Israel national baseball team in the 2013 World Baseball Classic and 2023 World Baseball Classic. He was ranked the Dodgers' top prospect by Baseball America after the 2013 season. In 2014, he was named the Pacific Coast League (PCL) Most Valuable Player after hitting 30 home runs and stealing 30 bases, and he made his major league debut that September.

Beginning the 2015 season as the Dodgers' starting center fielder, Pederson was selected to start for the NL All-Star team. He became the first Dodger to hit at least 25 home runs in each of his first two seasons, with 25 in 2016. Pederson hit three home runs in the 2017 World Series, which the Dodgers lost to the Houston Astros. Pederson returned to the World Series in 2018 with the Dodgers, hitting a home run in Game 3 as the Dodgers lost to the Boston Red Sox. In 2019, he hit a career-high 36 home runs. In 2020, he had four hits in 10 at bats in the World Series as the Dodgers won the championship. He signed a one-year deal with the Chicago Cubs, and was traded mid-season to the Atlanta Braves as they won the World Series, making him the ninth player in Major League history to win back-to-back World Series with different teams. Following the 2021–22 lockout, Pederson signed a one-year contract with his hometown San Francisco Giants, and made his second career All-Star Game.

== Early life ==
Pederson was born in Palo Alto, California, and is the son of Shelly (née Cahn) and Stu Pederson. Stu played in eight games for the Los Angeles Dodgers in 1985, and spent 12 years in Minor League Baseball. Joc's mother was an athletic trainer in college. He is Jewish by birth (his mother is Jewish), and has played for the Israel national baseball team. (Note: Pederson's mother provided the papers evidencing his Jewish heritage after obtaining them from the synagogue her father Larry Cahn attended. His mother and both her parents are Jewish; Pederson's father is not.) Pederson grew up a San Francisco Giants fan.

Joc's older brother, Tyger, played baseball for the University of the Pacific, and then played second base in the Dodgers minor league system. Joc's eldest brother, Champ, has Down syndrome and sometimes stays with him during the season. His younger sister, Jacey, played soccer as a forward for the United States national under-17 team and played college soccer for the UCLA Bruins. Through 2022, Pederson was second among Jewish baseball players in career home run frequency (behind Hank Greenberg), seventh in career home runs (behind Al Rosen), and eighth in career slugging percentage (behind Ron Blomberg).

Pederson attended Palo Alto High School. In his senior year, Pederson batted .466 with a .577 on-base percentage (OBP) and an .852 slugging percentage, with 20 stolen bases in 22 attempts, playing center field and leading off for the school's baseball team. He also played for the school's football team, leading it with 30 receptions in his senior year, for 650 yards and 9 touchdowns. Pederson was the team's number one wide receiver, racking up more yards and touchdowns than his teammate, future NFL two-time All Pro First Team wide receiver Davante Adams, who was a Junior at the time. Pederson graduated in 2010.

== Professional career ==
=== Draft and minor leagues ===
In the 11th round of the 2010 MLB draft, Pederson was selected by the Los Angeles Dodgers. He had committed to play at the University of Southern California, where his father played college baseball, but Joc chose instead to sign with the Dodgers. He was given a $600,000 signing bonus to sign with the Dodgers. The bonus was the second-highest given to any draft pick the Dodgers signed that year, and it was four times the amount typically given to players drafted after the fifth round. Pederson had wanted more money, but he chose to accept their offer because he realized "My dream — my big dream — was to become a star in the big leagues."

In 2011, as the youngest player with the Ogden Raptors of the Pioneer League, Pederson had a .353 batting average/.429 OBP/.568 slugging percentage with 11 homers, leading the league with 64 runs batted in (RBI), a .997 on-base plus slugging (OPS) percentage, and nine outfield assists. He finished second with 24 stolen bases, second in on-base percentage, third with 54 runs, and third with 36 walks while playing in 68 games. Pederson was selected as both a Pioneer League and Rookie League All-Star, a Baseball America Rookie All Star, and a Topps Short-Season/Rookie League All Star. Baseball America rated him the Best Hitter for Average in the Dodgers system for the 2011 season.

Pederson was promoted to the High–A Rancho Cucamonga Quakes of the California League in 2012, at age 20. For the Quakes, he batted .313./.396/.526 with 96 runs (4th in the league), 48 extra base hits, and 26 stolen bases. The Dodgers selected Pederson as their 2012 "Minor League Player of the Year," and MILB.com named him a Dodgers organization All Star. Baseball America rated him the player with the best strike zone discipline in the Dodgers system. Following the season, the Dodgers assigned him to the Mesa Solar Sox in the Arizona Fall League, where he was an AFL Rising Star in 2012. He was ranked the Dodgers' # 4 prospect by Baseball America (and # 3 prospect by MILB.com) after the 2012 season.

In 2013, Pederson received a promotion to the Double–A Chattanooga Lookouts in the Southern League, starting the season as the youngest member of the team and the second-youngest position player in the league. Pederson was selected to play for the United States at the All-Star Futures Game, and was also selected to play in the Southern League All-Star Game. He hit .278 while leading the league with a .497 slugging percentage. Pederson also finished second with 22 home runs and 81 runs scored; third with 31 stolen bases, a .381 on-base percentage, and an .878 OPS; and fifth in walks. He had 58 RBI and 10 outfield assists in 123 games during the season, usually batting in the leadoff spot. Pederson earned postseason All-Star honors, was a Topps Double-A All Star, and was a Baseball America Minor League All Star. He then played winter ball for the Cardenales de Lara in the Venezuelan Winter League, where he had a .439 on-base percentage. He was ranked the Dodgers' # 1 prospect by Baseball America after the 2013 season.

In February 2014, Pederson was named the 34th-best prospect in baseball by Baseball America. The Dodgers invited him to spring training that year. Pederson was then assigned to the Triple–A Albuquerque Isotopes to begin the 2014 season. He was named minor league Prospect of the Month by MLBPipeline.com in April 2014 after batting .398 (second-best in the league)/.504/.663 with 6 home runs and 9 steals. He was the fifth-youngest position player in the Pacific Coast League, and almost five years younger than the league average. Ben Badler of Baseball America opined, "Pederson is the Dodgers' No. 1 prospect, No. 34 in baseball, and I still think he's underrated."

Pederson was named to the mid-season Pacific Coast League All-Star team after batting .319/.437 (leading the PCL)/.568 (3rd) with a 1.005 OPS (leading the PCL), 17 home runs (tied for sixth in the minor leagues), 57 walks (tied for first in the PCL), 58 runs scored (2nd in the PCL), and 20 stolen bases (3rd in the PCL), in 74 games. On August 23, in his 115th game of the season Pederson became the first player in the PCL in 80 years (since Frank Demaree in 1934, in 186 games), and the fourth all-time, to hit 30 homers and steal 30 bases in the same season. The only other Pacific Coast League hitters to do it were Lefty O'Doul (1927, in 189 games) and Hall of Famer Tony Lazzeri (1925, in 197 games). He was also only the second Dodger minor leaguer to ever do it, joining Chin-Feng Chen (1999; 31/31 for the Single–A Inland Empire 66ers of San Bernardino).

Pederson finished his minor league season hitting .303/.435 (leading the league)/.582 (3rd in the league). He led the PCL with 106 runs scored, 33 home runs, 100 walks, and a 1.017 OPS while stealing 30 bases (3rd in the league). Pederson set Isotopes single-season records for walks and runs scored. He batted .306/.442/.573 against righties and .299/.422/.598 against lefties, while hitting .366 with runners on base. After the season he received the 2014 PCL Most Valuable Player Award, a selection to the postseason All-PCL team, and the PCL Rookie of the Year Award. Baseball America named him their Triple–A Player of the Year, a Triple–A All-Star, and a member of their 2014 Minor League All-Star team. Pederson was named the organization's top player for the second time, though he was a co-winner with shortstop Corey Seager this year.

=== Los Angeles Dodgers (2014–2020) ===
==== 2014 ====
With major league rosters expanding to 40 players for September, Pederson was added to the Dodgers' 40-man roster and called up to the Majors for the first time on September 1, 2014. Manager Don Mattingly said "The people in our organization that have seen him the most say he's the best center fielder in our organization."

That night against the Washington Nationals, with the Dodgers trailing 6–4 with two outs and two runners on base, Pederson pinch-hit for pitcher Yimi García. He took Rafael Soriano to a full count, but was called out on strikes to end the game. He started in center field the following day, and picked up his first Major League hit on a single off of Doug Fister in the second inning. In 18 games, he had four hits in 28 at bats.

==== 2015 ====
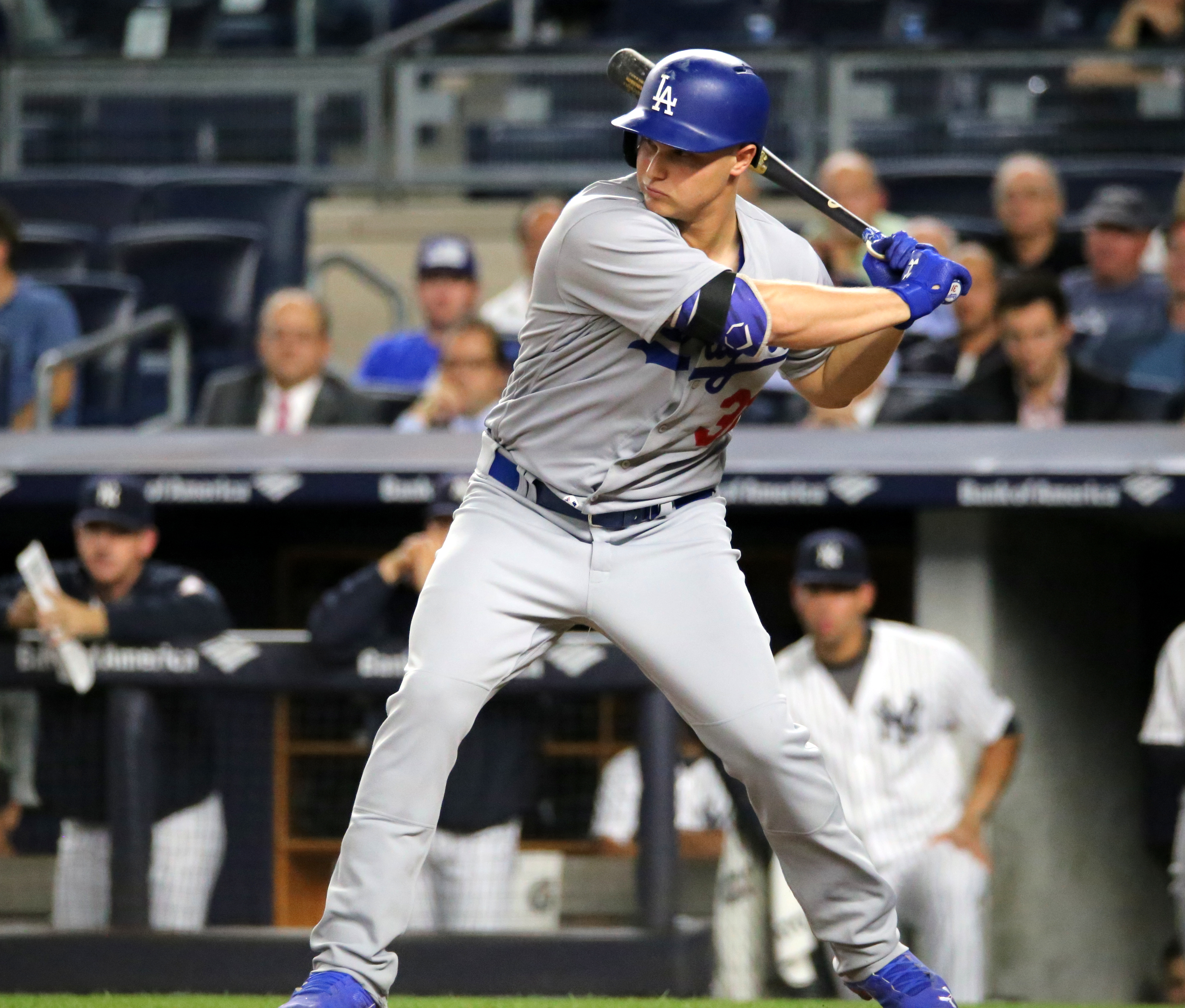
Pederson with the Dodgers in 2015

Baseball America named Pederson the #8 prospect in 2015, and MLB.com ranked him the 13th-best prospect in baseball going into the 2015 season. The offseason trade of Matt Kemp created an opening in center field, and Pederson was named the Opening Day starting center fielder, beating out the veteran Andre Ethier for the position.

He hit his first MLB home run on April 12 off of A. J. Schugel of the Arizona Diamondbacks in a 7–4 victory. On May 1, he hit his first major league grand slam off of Rubby De La Rosa of the Diamondbacks, a 446-foot blow. Pederson homered in both games of a day-night doubleheader on June 2; his second homer travelled an estimated 480 feet. On June 3, he homered in his fifth consecutive game, becoming only the fifth Dodgers to ever do so.

Pederson was selected to the National League squad in the 2015 Major League Baseball All-Star Game, the first Dodgers rookie to be selected as an All Star since Hideo Nomo in 1995, He became the first Dodgers rookie position player to ever start in an All-Star game. He was also selected to participate in the 2015 Home Run Derby. The #4 seed, Pederson made it all the way to the final round, losing 15–14 to Todd Frazier.

However, Pederson's performance tailed off in June and July. He batted .230 with 20 home runs before the All-Star Game, but he would only hit six in the second half of the season, batting .178 for the remainder of the season. On August 23, Pederson lost his starting center fielder job due to his extended slump.

In 151 games in 2015, he hit .210/.346/.417 with 26 homers (the second-most by a Dodger rookie in franchise history, behind Mike Piazza's 35 in 1993), 67 runs, 54 RBIs, and 92 walks (fifth in the NL). His batting average was the lowest among qualified hitters. He tied the lowest RBI total ever by a player with 25 or more homers (Ron Gant also hit 26 home runs with 54 RBIs, in 2000). He also tied Matt Kemp for the Dodgers franchise strikeout record, with 170 (3rd in the National League). His exit velocity on a batted ball of 114.3 mph was in the top 4% of all major leaguers. At the conclusion of the season, he was selected to Baseball America's All-Rookie team.

The Dodgers won the NL West title, and Pederson reached the playoffs for the first time as Los Angeles faced the New York Mets in the 2015 NL Division Series (NLDS). He had starts in Games 1 and 5 of the series, but was hitless as the Dodgers fell to the Mets in five games.

==== 2016 ====
Despite losing his starting role late in the 2015 season, Pederson began 2016 as the Dodgers' center fielder once again, though he would serve in a platoon role, mainly playing against right-handers. He hit solo home runs against Jered Weaver and A. J. Achter on May 17 in a 5–1 victory over the Los Angeles Angels. Against the Diamondbacks on June 14, he hit two solo home runs against Archie Bradley in a 7–4 victory. On June 28, Pederson left a game against the Milwaukee Brewers after spraining his right AC joint while making a diving catch against the outfield wall; he was placed on the DL three days later, but he returned on July 19. On July 29, he hit a two-run home run against Daniel Hudson and had four RBIs in a 9–7 victory over the Diamondbacks. He hit solo home runs against Tom Koehler and Brian Ellington on September 10 in a 5–0 victory over the Miami Marlins.

Pederson appeared in 137 games in 2016, batting 246/.352/.495 with 25 home runs, 25 doubles, and 68 RBIs. His 25 home runs averaged a distance of 412.1 feet (the 7th-longest average distance of any MLB hitter), and he saw 4.18 pitches-per-plate-appearance (10th-most in the NL). He became the first Dodger to hit 25 home runs in each of his first two seasons. His average exit velocity on a batted ball of 92.3 mph was in the top 5% of all major leaguers.

For the second year in a row, Pederson reached the playoffs as the Dodgers clinched their fourth straight NL West title. In the third inning of Game 4 of the 2016 NLDS against the Nationals, Pederson had a painful RBI, driving in a run when Joe Ross hit him with a pitch with the bases loaded. Pederson later had an RBI double in the fifth inning against Reynaldo López, and the Dodgers won 6–5. His home run against Max Scherzer in the seventh inning of Game 5 forced Scherzer from the game and opened the scoring for the Dodgers, who won 4–3 to advance to the NL Championship Series (NLCS) against the Chicago Cubs. In Game 3 of the NLCS, he had an RBI single against Mike Montgomery and scored a run as the Dodgers beat the Cubs 6–0. He had four hits in 21 at bats in the series, scoring three runs, but the Dodgers fell to the Cubs in six games.

==== 2017 ====
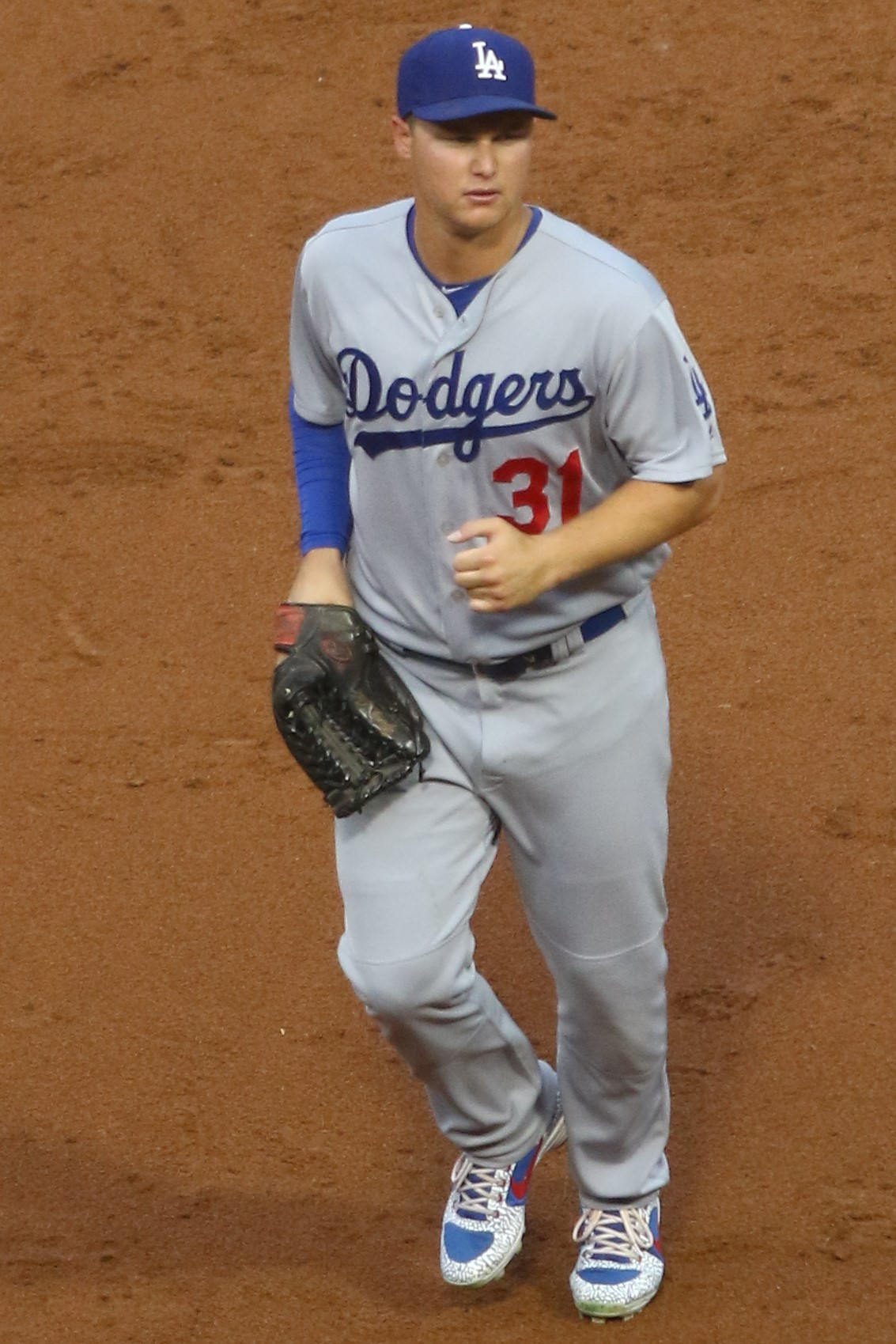
Pederson in 2017

Pederson started the 2017 season strong, hitting a grand slam home run on Opening Day (April 3) against the San Diego Padres. It was the first grand slam by a Dodger hitter on Opening Day since Eric Karros hit one on April 3, 2000, against Montreal. His five Opening Day RBIs were the most by a Dodger since Raúl Mondesí drove in six in 1999 against the Diamondbacks. On May 23, in a 2–1 win over the St. Louis Cardinals, Pederson collided with teammate Yasiel Puig in the outfield, and went on the 7-day concussion disabled list. He would not return until June 13, when González went on the disabled list. Pederson's batting average fell from .248 on July 28 to .215 on August 18 after he batted .049 in 15 games. On August 19, Pederson was sent to Triple-A after the Dodgers acquired Curtis Granderson from the New York Mets. “That was [my] first time being demoted," Pederson reflected. "But the [PCL] showed me a lot, the stuff I needed to work on." Pederson felt like he had made helpful adjustments, but he only batted .182 after getting recalled in September. In 2017, he batted .212/.331/.407 with 11 home runs and 35 RBIs in 273 at bats. His exit velocity on a batted ball of 114.1 mph was in the top 5% of all major leaguers.

The Dodgers won the NL West for the fifth year in a row, but Pederson was left off their roster for the start of the playoffs. He was added to the roster for the 2017 NLCS because of an injury to All-Star shortstop Corey Seager. Pederson was used mainly off the bench in the series, though he did get a start in Game 3; the Dodgers won the series in five games. Seager returned for the 2017 World Series against the Houston Astros, and Granderson was left off the roster to make room for him, opening up playing time for other Dodger outfielders. After not playing in Game 1, Pederson started five of the next six World Series games. In the World Series, Pederson broke a Dodgers postseason record that had been established in 1953, as he had extra-base hits in five consecutive games, surpassing Billy Cox, Andre Ethier, and A.J. Ellis. He hit a fifth-inning home run against Justin Verlander in Game 2, the first hit of the game for the Dodgers, though they would go on to lose 7–6. In Game 4, with the Dodgers leading 3–1 in the top of the ninth, Pederson hit a three-run home run against Joe Musgrove, adding insurance as the Dodgers won 6–2. "That was a huge hit by Joc," manager Dave Roberts told reporters after the game. He hit another home run against Musgrove in Game 6, as the Dodgers won 3–1. In 18 at bats, he batted .333/.400/.944 and led the Dodgers in runs (6) and home runs (3), while tying for the team lead in doubles (2) and RBIs (5). However, the Dodgers would fall to the Astros in seven games.

==== 2018 ====
Before the 2018 season, Pederson signed a one-year, $2.6 million contract with the Dodgers, avoiding salary arbitration. He spent much of the season in a platoon role in left field with the right-handed Kemp, whom the Dodgers had reacquired. He had two-home-run games within a week of each other, in Dodger victories on June 2 and 8.

On September 29, Pederson hit his eighth leadoff home run of the season, off San Francisco Giants starting pitcher Dereck Rodríguez, passing Davey Lopes for the franchise record for leadoff home runs in one season. For the season, in 59 games batting as the leadoff hitter, he hit .309/.356/.818. In his 2018 campaign, he played in 148 games, hitting .248/.321/.522 with 25 home runs and 56 RBIs in 395 at bats. His improvement in slugging percentage of .115 over the prior year helped him earn the fifth-highest slugging percentage in the majors. On defense, Pederson had the third-best fielding percentage among National League left fielders (.992), finishing fifth among them in assists (six).

The Dodgers won the NL West for the sixth year in a row, putting Pederson in the playoffs for his fourth straight year. In Game One of the 2018 NLDS, Pederson hit a first pitch leadoff home run against Mike Foltynewicz of the Braves in a 6–0 victory. He had hits in each of the other games of the series, which the Dodgers won in four games. In the NLCS, he had three hits in 13 at bats as Los Angeles defeated the Brewers in seven games. After appearing off the bench in the first two games of the 2018 World Series against the Boston Red Sox, Pederson played 15 innings of Game 3, hitting a solo home run against Rick Porcello in the third inning of an 18-inning, 3–2 Dodger triumph. That was Los Angeles's only victory of the series, as they fell to the Red Sox in five games.

==== 2019 ====
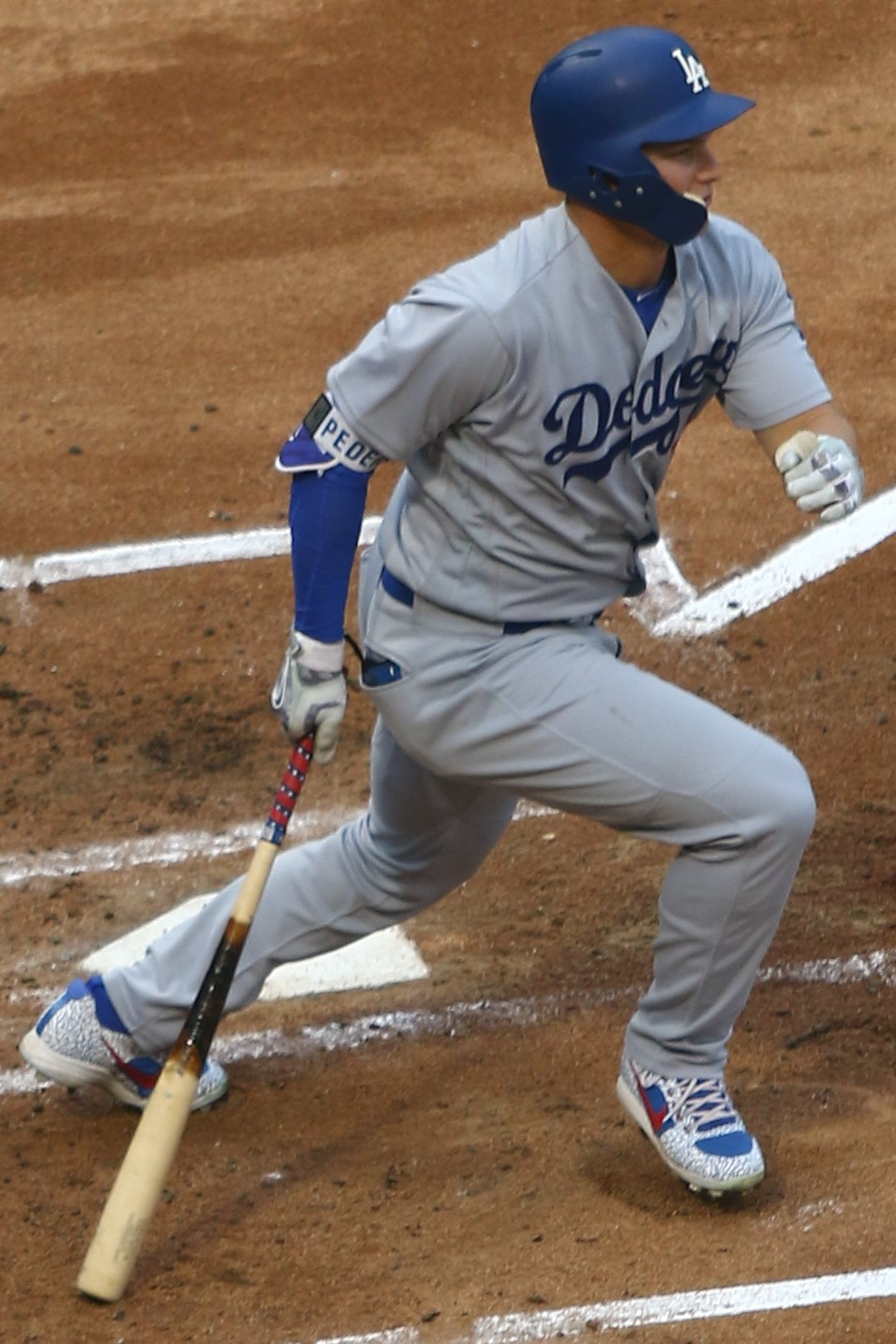
Pederson running towards first base

Pederson agreed to a one-year, $5 million contract with the Dodgers for 2019, avoiding salary arbitration. He platooned in left field with Chris Taylor, though Pederson would finish the year with a career-high 450 at bats. On May 14, Pederson hit his 100th career home run against San Diego Padres starting pitcher Chris Paddack. From May 19 through June 1, Pederson recorded 16 hits in 33 at bats, raising his batting average from .218 to .274, though it would fall back to .239 at the All-Star Break. Pederson participated in the Home Run Derby at the 2019 MLB All-Star Game, and lost in the semi-finals to Vladimir Guerrero Jr. in a battle that went to a swing off tie-breaker. From September 1 to 4, he became the second player in National League history (after Larry Walker) to have an extra-base hit in six consecutive at bats.

Pederson "enjoyed a career year in 2019," according to Mike Chiari of bleacherreport.com. He played in 149 games, hitting .249/.339/.538 with 36 home runs and 74 RBIs in 450 at bats, and was 5th in the NL and tied for 5th of all Dodgers ever with a home run every 12.5 at bats. He tied the major league record with six multi-homer games from the leadoff spot (matching Francisco Lindor in 2018).

In the first game of the 2019 NLDS against the Washington Nationals, Pederson smashed the hardest-hit Dodgers home run of the year, with a 114.9 mph exit velocity. The Dodgers won that game 6–0. Pederson also had two hits and a run scored in Game 5, but the Nationals defeated the Dodgers 7–3 in 10 innings, clinching a series victory.

==== 2020 ====
Pederson was awarded a $7.5 million salary for the 2020 season after losing an arbitration hearing with the Dodgers. In early 2020, Pederson and Ross Stripling were nearly traded to the Los Angeles Angels in exchange for Luis Rengifo, but the trade fell through. The MLB season did not start until July 24 due to the COVID-19 pandemic. As a result, the season lasted only 60 games; Pederson appeared in 43 of them. Though still used primarily as a corner outfielder, he began getting a few starts at designated hitter as the NL implemented the position for the first time that season. In the second game of a doubleheader against the Padres on August 5, he hit two home runs and had five RBIs in a 7–6 Dodger triumph.

In 2020, Pederson batted .190/.285/.397 with 21 runs, seven home runs, and 16 RBIs in 121 at bats. He ended the year fourth in career at-bats-per-home-run among all Dodgers (16.6), and 10th in career hit by pitch (44). His average exit velocity on batted balls of 93.0 mph was in the top 4% of all major leaguers. He had only one at bat in the first round of the playoffs, but had two hits in five at bats in the second round, including two RBIs.

In Game 3 of the 2020 National League Championship Series, he was one of three Dodgers to hit a home run in the first inning, marking the first time three players from the same team had homered in the first inning of a playoff game. On Pederson's playoff success, Dodgers starting pitcher Alex Wood quipped, "They call it 'Joctober' for a reason." Pederson had seven hits in 18 at bats in that series. In Game 5 of the 2020 World Series, Pederson hit the fifth home run of his World Series career, a second-inning solo shot against Tyler Glasnow that proved to be the winning margin of victory in Los Angeles's 4–2 triumph. Max Muncy noted "The guy performs on the huge stage. This is just what he does." In the World Series, Pederson had four hits in 10 at bats as the Dodgers won the championship.

Altogether, Pederson batted .382 (leading the Dodgers)/.432/.559 with a .991 OPS, two home runs, and eight RBIs in the playoffs for the Dodgers. After the World Series, he became a free agent.

=== Chicago Cubs (2021) ===
On February 5, 2021, Pederson signed a one-year $7 million guaranteed contract with the Chicago Cubs which included a mutual option for the 2022 season. He was motivated to sign with the Cubs because he hoped for more playing time than he had received with the Dodgers. Due to his usual #31 being retired by the Cubs for both Greg Maddux and Fergie Jenkins, Pederson chose to sport the new number of #24 for his tenure with the team as he began the season starting in left field daily. He was placed on the injured list on April 22, and was struggling offensively at the time, hitting .137 with 1 HR, 4 RBIs, and 20 strikeouts. Pederson returned on May 3, and was inserted into the leadoff spot in the lineup, as regular leadoff hitter Ian Happ had ended up on the injured list after an outfield collision. Of his final 57 games with the Cubs, 42 were starts from the leadoff position, and he raised his batting average as high as .269.

All told, Pederson played in 73 games for the Cubs, hitting .230/.300/.418 with 11 home runs and 39 RBIs in 256 at bats. He played 66 games in left field, 3 in right field, 2 in center field, and one at first base.

=== Atlanta Braves (2021) ===
On July 15, 2021, Pederson was traded to the Atlanta Braves in exchange for minor league prospect Bryce Ball. Atlanta had just lost superstar Ronald Acuña Jr. to a long-term ACL injury, and Pederson stepped into Acuña Jr.'s positions of right field and leadoff hitter. With #31 again being retired by the Braves for Greg Maddux and #24 having been taken already by new teammate William Contreras, Pederson chose to honor two former teammates, Clayton Kershaw and Jason Heyward from Los Angeles and Chicago respectively, by wearing #22 for his Braves tenure. On July 17, Pederson recorded his first hit as a Brave, a two-run home run in the fourth inning, against Tampa Bay Rays' rookie Josh Fleming.

In the 2021 regular season, playing for the Braves, Pederson batted .249/.325/.428 with 7 home runs and 22 RBIs in 173 at bats. He played 36 games in right field and 24 games in center field. For the season between both teams, against righties, he batted .230/.298/.435, while against lefties he batted .265/.348/.378 with 21 starts - in contrast to his prior three seasons, during which he had a total of only nine starts against left-handers. With two outs and runners in scoring position, he batted .327/.411/.490.

Throughout the 2021 post-season, Pederson donned a signature pearl necklace, culminating in fans wearing replica pearl necklaces to the team's games. Following the Braves' World Series victory, Pederson's pearl necklace was sent to the National Baseball Hall of Fame.

In the post-season, Pederson hit two pinch hit home runs as Atlanta won the 2021 National League Division Series against the Brewers, despite starting only once in four games, making him the third player in history with two in a single postseason series. Then in Game 2 of the 2021 National League Championship Series, Pederson hit a two-run home run against three-time Cy Young Award winner Max Scherzer, as the Braves came from behind to beat the Dodgers 5–4. His home run traveled 454 feet (138 m) (the longest home run of the 2021 postseason at the time), and had an exit velocity of 112.2 miles per hour (180.6 km/h) (the third-hardest-hit home run Scherzer had surrendered since Statcast began tracking data in 2015). With 12 playoff home runs, Pederson tied Hall of Famer Yogi Berra for 24th on the all-time list. The Braves went on to win the 2021 World Series, making Pederson the ninth player in Major League history to win back-to-back World Series with different teams.

Through 2021, he had a .501 career slugging percentage against right-handed pitching, and since his first full season in 2015, he ranked 5th among NL outfielders in home runs (130), and 7th in walks (295). He had played 412 games in center field, 229 games in left field, 54 games in right field, and 20 games at first base.

=== San Francisco Giants (2022–2023) ===
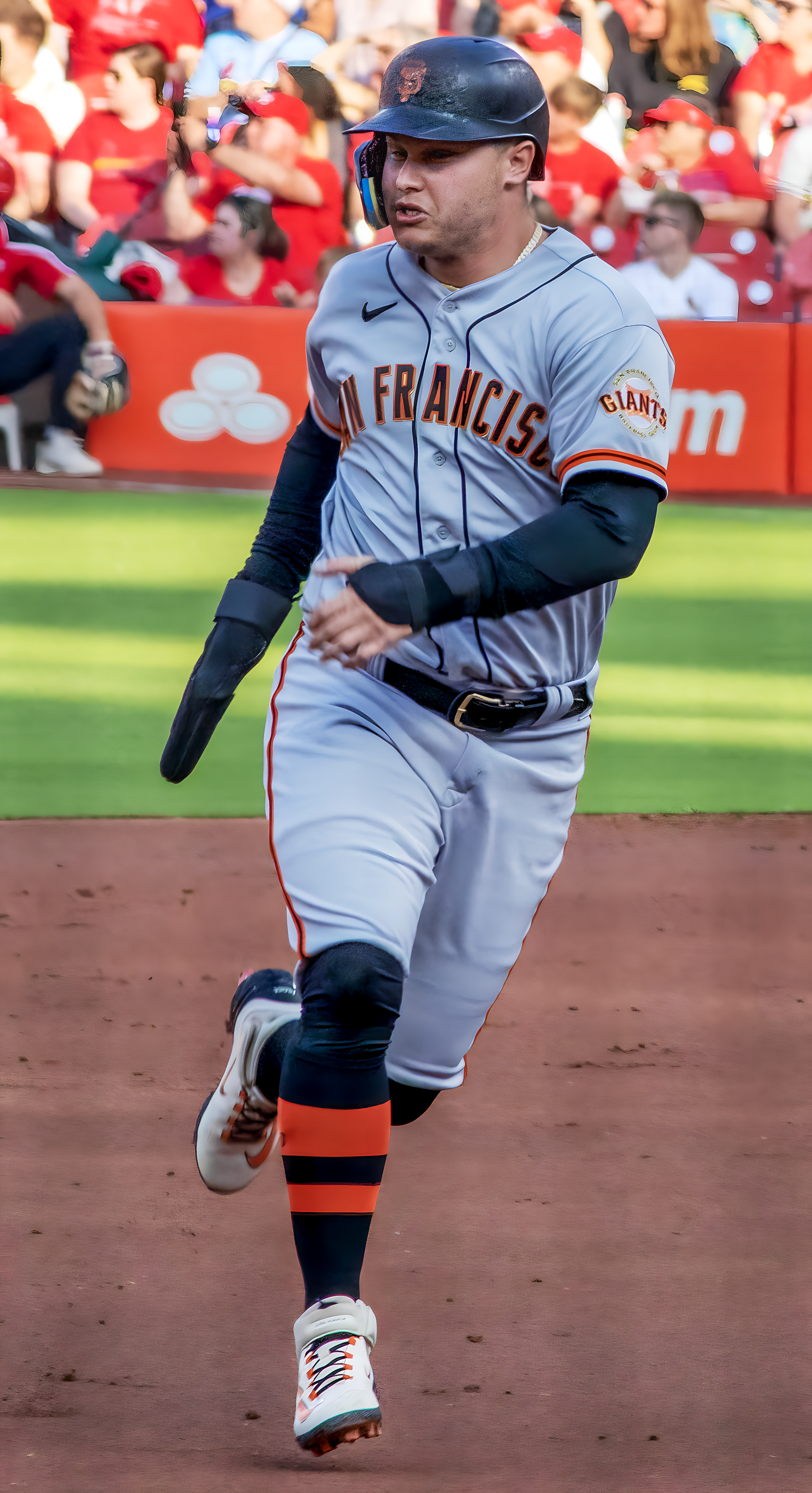
Pederson on the Giants, 2023.

On March 16, 2022, Pederson signed a one-year, $6 million contract with the San Francisco Giants, returning to the National League West, as well as the Bay Area, where he grew up.

On April 24, 2022, Pederson hit a 441-foot leadoff home run, the longest Giants leadoff home run since Statcast's inception in 2015, and his 24th career leadoff home run, in his 18th career multi-homer game, against Nationals right-hander Joan Adon.

On May 24, Pederson hit three home runs and eight RBIs as he led the Giants to a 13–12 win over the New York Mets. Pederson became the second Giant to hit three home runs in a game at Oracle Park, joining Pablo Sandoval. His eight RBIs matched the San Francisco-era Giants record also held by Willie Mays, Orlando Cepeda, and Brandon Crawford. He became the first Giants player to hit three multi-run home runs in a game since Willie Mays in 1961. He also became only the second major league player in the last century, joining Joe DiMaggio, to hit three home runs, have 8 RBIs, and have game-tying RBIs in both the eighth and ninth innings in one game. Pederson became the second player to hit a home run into McCovey Cove as both a Giants player and a visiting player, joining Ryan Klesko.

Pederson started in the outfield for the National League in his return to Dodger Stadium for the 2022 Major League Baseball All-Star Game, his second career All-Star selection and start.

In 2022, Pederson batted .274/.353/.521 in 380 at bats, with 23 home runs and 70 RBIs. He was in the top 2% of all batters in both average exit velocity (93.1 mph; 5th-best in the majors) and percentage of balls that were hard hit (51.9%; 7th-best). He was also in the top 5% of all batters in barrel percentage, and had an .894 OPS against right-handed pitchers, 10th-best among all left-handed hitters who had at least 250 plate appearances. He batted .388 with runners in scoring position, second-best figure in the majors behind Freddie Freeman (.391). With two outs and runners in scoring position, he batted .378/.452/.784. He was 10th among active players in career at bats per home run, at 17.3.

On November 10, the Giants made him a qualifying offer (a one-year contract at the average salary of Major League Baseball's 125 highest-paid players) of $19.65 million, which he accepted to return to the team for another season.

In 2023, Pederson batted .235/.348/.416 in 358 at bats with 59 runs, 15 home runs, 51 RBIs, and 57 walks, while playing 79 games at DH, 32 in left field, six in right field, and two at first base. He was fifth in the NL of all batters with 400 or more plate appearances in hard-hit percentage (52.2%), sixth in maximum exit velocity (116.6 mph), and 10th in average exit velocity (92.1 mph).

=== Arizona Diamondbacks (2024) ===
On January 30, 2024, Pederson signed a one-year, $12.5 million deal with the Arizona Diamondbacks that included a mutual option for 2025.

In 2024 Pederson batted .275/.393(leading the NL of all batters with 400 or more plate appearances)/.515(6th) in 367 at bats with 62 runs, 23 home runs, 64 RBIs, 55 walks, and 18 hit by pitch (leading the NL), while hitting a home run in every 16.0 at bats (10th in the league) and stealing a career-high seven bases. He played 120 games at DH, and pinch-hit in 27 games. He was fourth in the NL of all batters with 400 or more plate appearances in OPS, sixth in Isolated Power (.240), and seventh in walk percentage (12.2%) and pull percentage (50.0%). Pederson declined his share of the mutual 2025 option after the season, making him a free agent.

=== Texas Rangers (2025–2026) ===
On December 30, 2024, Pederson signed a two-year, $37 million contract with the Texas Rangers. Pederson struggled to begin the 2025 season, as he endured a career-worst 0-for-41 slump that spanned from April 2 to April 23, with the hitless stretch setting a new franchise record for the Rangers.

On May 24, Pederson suffered a broken right hand after getting hit by a pitch, and was subsequently placed on the 10-day injured list. He made his return from the injury on July 27, after missing 52 games. He hit .181 with nine home runs and 26 RBI in 96 games in the 2025 season.

On November 6, Pederson exercised his $18.5 million player option for the 2026 season. On October 30, 2026, Pederson declined his mutual option and became a free agent.

== International career ==
=== 2013 ===
Due to his Jewish heritage, Pederson was eligible to play for the Israel national baseball team in the qualifying rounds of the 2013 World Baseball Classic, the youngest player on the team. The Israeli team has the same requirement as does Israel for automatic Israeli citizenship: that a person have at least one Jewish grandparent. Pederson's mother provided the papers evidencing his Jewish heritage after obtaining them from the synagogue her father Larry Cahn attended.

He batted second for Team Israel and hit .308 with three steals. Pederson started all three games of the qualifier in right field. During the first game, Pederson went 1-for-5 with two strikeouts and left three runners on base. He went 2-for-4 with a run scored and a strikeout in the second game, also stealing a base. During the third and final game, Pederson went 1-for-4, scored two runs, walked twice, struck out, and stole a base. One of Pederson's Team Israel coaches was Gabe Kapler, who nine years later became his manager with the San Francisco Giants.

=== 2023 ===
Pederson played for Israel again in the 2023 World Baseball Classic. He played center field for Team Israel manager Ian Kinsler, and alongside pitcher Dean Kremer and others.

== Accolades ==
In 2019, Pederson was inducted into the Jewish Sports Hall of Fame of Northern California. He was inducted into the Southern California Jewish Sports Hall of Fame in 2020.

== Personal life ==
Pederson married his longtime girlfriend, Kelsey Williams in January 2018. They lived in Studio City, California at the time, but sold their home in 2022. In October 2018, during the National League Championship Series between the Dodgers and the Milwaukee Brewers, their daughter was born. The couple's son was born a month before the Dodgers' 2020 World Series championship victory over the Tampa Bay Rays. He and his wife announced that they were expecting their third child in October 2022.

== See also ==
- List of Jewish Major League Baseball players
- List of Jews in Sports
- List of second-generation Major League Baseball players
- List of Major League Baseball career home run leaders
