= Michael Busch (baseball) =

American baseball player (born 1997)

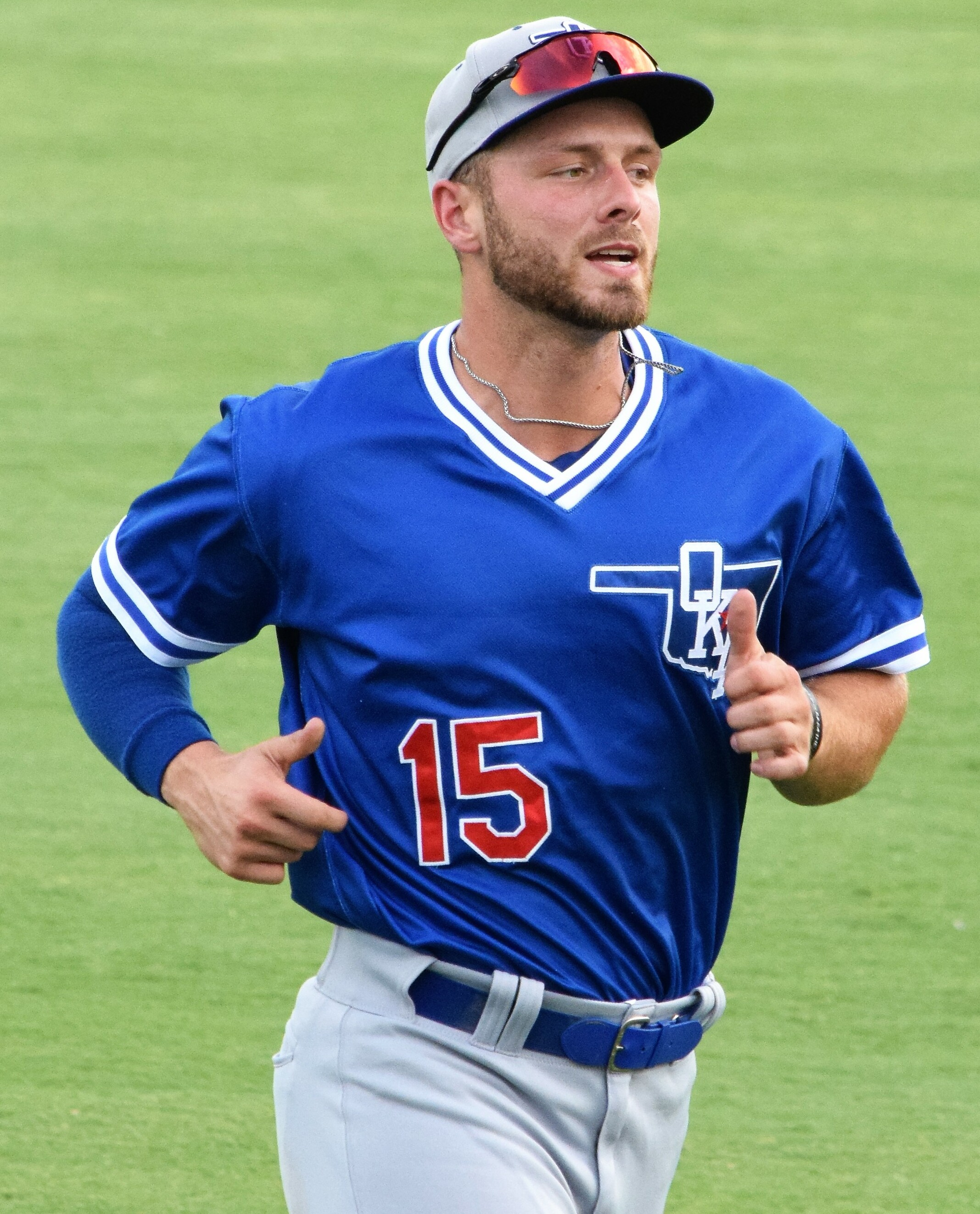
- Busch with the Oklahoma City Dodgers in 2023

Chicago Cubs – No. 29
- First baseman
- Born: November 9, 1997 (age 28); Inver Grove Heights, Minnesota, U.S.
- Bats: Left Throws: Right

MLB debut
- April 25, 2023, for the Los Angeles Dodgers

MLB statistics (through 2026 season)
- Batting average: .246
- Home runs: 77
- Runs batted in: 239
- Stats at Baseball Reference

Teams
- Los Angeles Dodgers (2023); Chicago Cubs (2024–present)

Michael James Busch (born November 9, 1997) is an American professional baseball first baseman for the Chicago Cubs of Major League Baseball (MLB). He has previously played in MLB for the Los Angeles Dodgers. He played college baseball for the North Carolina Tar Heels and made his MLB debut in 2023 with the Dodgers.

== Amateur career ==
Busch attended Simley High School in Inver Grove Heights, Minnesota, where he played football, hockey and baseball. He was ranked as the fourth-best player in the state of Minnesota by Perfect Game. During his senior baseball season, Busch was an All-State selection. Undrafted out of high school in the 2016 Major League Baseball draft, he enrolled at the University of North Carolina to play college baseball for the North Carolina Tar Heels.

In 2017, as a freshman at North Carolina, Busch appeared in 55 games, hitting .215 with three home runs and 22 RBIs. After the season, he played in the Northwoods League for the St. Cloud Rox. As a sophomore in 2018, Busch started all 64 of North Carolina's games, batting .317 with 13 home runs and 63 RBIs. He batted .636 during the NCAA tournament's Chapel Hill Regional and was named the Most Outstanding Player, helping lead North Carolina to the 2018 College World Series. He was named to the All-ACC Second Team. Following the season, he played in the Cape Cod Baseball League for the Chatham Anglers, where batted .322 with six home runs in 27 games and was named to the All-Cape League Team. Prior to the 2019 season, Busch was named a preseason All-American by multiple media outlets, including Perfect Game and Baseball America. Over 65 games, he batted .284 with 16 home runs and 57 RBIs.

== Professional career ==
=== Los Angeles Dodgers ===
Considered one of the top prospects for the 2019 Major League Baseball draft, Busch was selected by the Los Angeles Dodgers with the 31st overall pick. He signed with the Dodgers on July 5 for a $2.31 million bonus. He appeared in ten games in the Dodgers farm system in 2019, split between the Arizona League Dodgers and Great Lakes Loons, and had three hits in 24 at-bats, batting .125/.371/.125.

Busch played for the Glendale Desert Dogs of the Arizona Fall League following the season and had 13 at bats. He did not play a minor league game in 2020 due to the cancellation of the minor league season because of the COVID-19 pandemic.

For the 2021 season, he was assigned to the Tulsa Drillers. In June, Busch was selected to play in the All-Star Futures Game at Coors Field. Busch appeared in 107 games for the Drillers, hitting .267 with twenty home runs and 67 RBIs, while primarily playing second base. He was selected as a post-season Double-A Central All-Star. He returned to Tulsa to begin the 2022 season. After batting .306 with 11 home runs and 29 RBIs over 31 games he was promoted to the Oklahoma City Dodgers, where he hit .266 in 111 games with 21 homers and 79 RBIs; he primarily played second base for the two teams.

On November 15, 2022, the Dodgers added Busch to the 40-man roster to protect him from the Rule 5 draft. He was optioned to Oklahoma City to begin the 2023 season. He was called up to the majors for the first time on April 25 and made his debut as the designated hitter against the Pittsburgh Pirates. He was selected as the organizations Minor League Player of the Year after he hit .323 with 27 home runs and 90 RBI in 98 games for Oklahoma City, helping them win the Pacific Coast League (PCL) championship. In 2023 in Triple A he played primarily third base (61 games) and second base (26 games). He was honored after the season as the MVP and Top Prospect of the PCL.

In 2023 Busch played in 27 games in the majors, and hit .167/.247/.292 with two home runs and seven RBIs, with 27 strikeouts in 72 at bats. He played 13 games at third base, four at first base, one at second base, and eight at designated hitter. His first major league hit was a single off of Johan Oviedo of the Pirates, and his first MLB home run was off Gavin Williams of the Cleveland Guardians on August 24.

=== Chicago Cubs ===
On January 11, 2024, the Dodgers traded Busch and Yency Almonte to the Chicago Cubs in exchange for Jackson Ferris and Zyhir Hope. From April 10 to 15, Busch homered in five straight games, tying the longest streak by a Cub. Over the season, he would spend most of his time at first base, only playing 18 1/3 innings at second and third base combined. Busch finished the season with 21 home runs and 65 RBI while slashing .248/.335/.440.

Busch finished third in Phase 1 of fan voting for the 2025 MLB All-Star Game. On July 4, Busch became the first Cubs first baseman since Ernie Banks to have three-homer game. At the All-Star break he was slashing .290/.375/.550 with 19 home runs, three triples, 15 doubles, 45 runs on 87 hits, and 59 RBI. Busch's OPS of .925 was fifth in all of Major League Baseball. Busch ended the 2025 MLB Regular Season with a career-high 34 home runs and 90 RBI, slashing .261/.343/.523.
