= Stu Pederson =

American baseball player (born 1960)

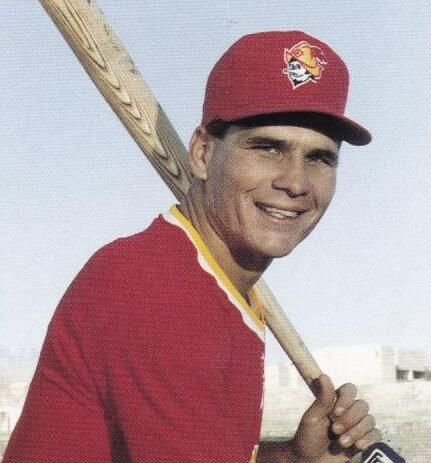
- Pederson with the Albuquerque Dukes c. 1987

Glacier Range Riders
- Outfielder / Coach
- Born: January 28, 1960 (age 66); Palo Alto, California, U.S.
- Batted: Left Threw: Left

MLB debut
- September 8, 1985, for the Los Angeles Dodgers

Last MLB appearance
- October 6, 1985, for the Los Angeles Dodgers

MLB statistics
- Batting average: .000
- Home runs: 0
- Runs batted in: 1
- Stats at Baseball Reference

Teams
- Los Angeles Dodgers (1985)

Stuart Russell Pederson (born January 28, 1960) is an American former professional baseball outfielder who played for the Los Angeles Dodgers of Major League Baseball. He is the father of outfielder Joc Pederson.

== Baseball career ==
=== College ===
Pederson played college baseball for Foothill College, University of the Pacific and University of Southern California.

=== Minor leagues ===
Pederson was selected in the 9th round (228th overall) of the 1981 MLB draft by the Los Angeles Dodgers out of the University of Southern California. Pederson debuted with the Single-A Lodi Dodgers, hitting a home run in his first at bat, and finished his first professional season with a walk-off home run that gave Lodi the 1981 California League Championship.

In 1982, with the Vero Beach Dodgers, he led the Florida State League in triples (18), was second in runs (95), hits (156), and on base percentage (.434), and third in batting average (.336), slugging percentage (.494), and RBIs (79). In 1983 with the San Antonio Dodgers, he was second in the Texas League in triples (12). In 1984 with San Antonio, he tied Mariano Duncan for the league lead in triples with 11, and was second in the league in RBIs (86).

He played 473 games for the Syracuse Chiefs of the International League from 1988 to 1992. The team had a "Stu Pederson Night" during the 1991 season. In his 12 minor league seasons, he batted .292 with a .389 on-base percentage and a .441 slugging percentage, with 90 home runs and 73 stolen bases in 4,137 at bats, and pitched 7 innings.

On August 18, 2012, Pederson was inducted into the Syracuse Chiefs Wall of Fame.

=== Major Leagues ===
His career included 8 games for the Dodgers during the 1985 season at the age of 25. He debuted on September 8, 1985, and played his final major league game on October 6.

=== After professional baseball ===
Following his playing days, Pederson coached high school baseball at Palo Alto High School, from which he graduated in 1978. He then coached at Cupertino High School.

Pederson owns a business that sells tickets for sporting events, concerts, and theater events.

Pederson has coached in a number of summer collegiate baseball leagues, including in Alaska and the Northwoods League.

In 2022, Pedersen was named manager of the Glacier Range Riders of the Pioneer League after serving as a bench coach for the Kalispell, Montana based team in their inaugural 2021 season.

== Family ==
His wife, Shelly Pederson, was an athletic trainer in college.

Pederson's sons Joc and Tyger were both drafted by the Dodgers. Joc was drafted out of Palo Alto High School in the 11th round of the 2010 MLB draft, was ranked the Dodgers' no. 1 prospect after the 2013 season. He made his major league debut in 2014. Tyger, an infielder for the University of the Pacific Tigers in Stockton, California, was drafted in the 33rd round of the 2013 MLB draft and briefly played in the Dodgers minor league system. His eldest son is named Champ, and has Down syndrome. His daughter, Jacey, is an amateur soccer player who played forward on the United States national under-17 team and played college soccer for UCLA.
