= Steve Bilko =

American baseball player (1928–1978)

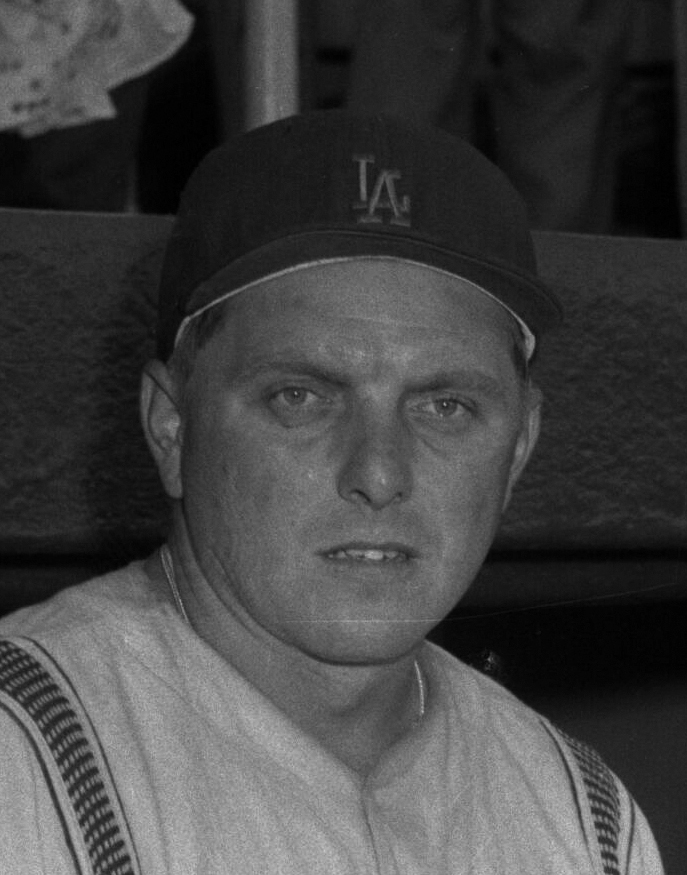
- Bilko with the Los Angeles Angels in 1956
- First baseman
- Born: November 13, 1928; Nanticoke, Pennsylvania, U.S.
- Died: March 7, 1978 (aged 49); Wilkes-Barre, Pennsylvania, U.S.
- Batted: Right Threw: Right

MLB debut
- September 22, 1949, for the St. Louis Cardinals

Last MLB appearance
- August 14, 1962, for the Los Angeles Angels

MLB statistics
- Batting average: .249
- Home runs: 76
- Run batted in: 276
- Stats at Baseball Reference

Teams
- St. Louis Cardinals (1949–1954); Chicago Cubs (1954); Cincinnati Redlegs (1958); Los Angeles Dodgers (1958); Detroit Tigers (1960); Los Angeles Angels (1961–1962)

Stephen Thomas Bilko (November 13, 1928 – March 7, 1978) was an American professional baseball player known for his home run hitting as a minor leaguer during the 1950s. He was 20 years old when he broke into Major League Baseball on September 22, 1949, with the St. Louis Cardinals. Bilko threw and batted right-handed; he was listed as 6 ft 1 in (1.85 m) tall, and 230 lb (100 kg), and was nicknamed "Stout Steve" during his career because of his ample girth.

Nat Hiken, creator of The Phil Silvers Show, supposedly took the name of the character Sgt. Bilko from the ballplayer, whose long-ball heroics for the Los Angeles Angels of the Pacific Coast League (PCL) in the mid-1950s made him a local celebrity.

== Biography ==
Bilko was born in Nanticoke, Pennsylvania, in coal mining country, and made his debut with the Allentown Cardinals in 1945 at the age of 16 during the final year of World War II.

A first baseman, Bilko enjoyed his greatest fame with the Los Angeles Angels of the Pacific Coast League from 1955–1957, when he won three consecutive PCL Most Valuable Player awards and home run titles. His greatest year came in 1956, when he won the PCL Triple Crown with a .360 batting average, 55 home runs and 164 runs batted in; he also led the league in runs scored (163) and hits (215). His Triple Crown year came for a pennant-winning Angels' team that won 107 games, and was sandwiched in between seasons in which Bilko belted 37 (1955) and 56 (1957) long balls. He was posthumously inducted into the Pacific Coast League Hall of Fame in 2003.

In addition to the Cardinals (1949–1954), Bilko also appeared in the majors for the Chicago Cubs (1954), Cincinnati Redlegs (1958), Los Angeles Dodgers (1958), Detroit Tigers (1960) and the American League's Los Angeles Angels (1961–1962), but he never enjoyed the phenomenal success he had with the PCL Angels in the 1950s. He was the Cardinals' regular first baseman in 1953 and smashed 21 homers with 84 RBI in 154 games, but led National League hitters in strikeouts with 125. Still, it was his most productive big-league season. As an original member of the American League Angels, an expansion team, he became the first player to appear for each of Los Angeles' MLB teams. Playing in his old minor-league haven, Los Angeles' Wrigley Field, Bilko responded with his second-best MLB campaign with 20 homers and 59 RBI in 1961.

In 600 games over ten major-league seasons, Bilko posted a .249 batting average (432-for-1,738) with 220 runs, 76 home runs, 276 RBI, 234 bases on balls and a .444 slugging percentage. Defensively, he recorded a .992 fielding percentage as a first baseman.

During his stay with the 1954 Cubs, announcer Bert Wilson placed Bilko at the end of what he hoped would be a soon-to-be-famous double play combination of Ernie Banks, Gene Baker and Bilko. His fanciful name for that trio was "Bingo to Bango to Bilko". However, Bilko got into only 47 games with the Wrigleys (only 22 of them at first base) before he was sent at season's end to the PCL Angels, the Cubs' top minor league affiliate, where he would become a legend.

Bilko died on March 7, 1978 during a long stay at Mercy Hospital in Wilkes-Barre, Pennsylvania due to an undisclosed illness. He had retired in 1977 from a local perfume company.

Bilko was inducted into the Baseball Reliquary's Shrine of the Eternals in 2015.

== Personal life ==
His granddaughter, Barbara Bilko, was a goaltender in ice hockey for the Ohio State Buckeyes from 2008–09 through 2010–2011.
