= Billy Cowan =

American baseball player (born 1938)

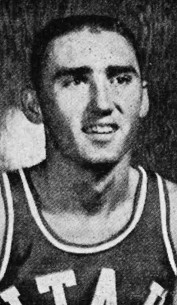
- Cowan, circa 1960
- Outfielder
- Born: August 28, 1938 (age 87); Calhoun City, Mississippi, U.S.
- Batted: Right Threw: Right

MLB debut
- September 9, 1963, for the Chicago Cubs

Last MLB appearance
- April 24, 1972, for the California Angels

MLB statistics
- Batting average: .236
- Home runs: 40
- Runs batted in: 125
- Stats at Baseball Reference

Teams
- Chicago Cubs (1963–1964); New York Mets (1965); Milwaukee Braves (1965); Philadelphia Phillies (1967); New York Yankees (1969); California Angels (1969–1972)

Billy Rolland Cowan (born August 28, 1938) is an American former professional baseball player. Appearing primarily as an outfielder, Cowan totalled 493 games played, over all or part of eight Major League Baseball (MLB) seasons, for the Chicago Cubs (1963–64), New York Mets (1965), Milwaukee Braves (1965), Philadelphia Phillies (1967), New York Yankees (1969), and California Angels (1969–72).

== Early life ==
Born in Calhoun City, Mississippi, Cowan grew up in Bakersfield, California, where he was a standout athlete at East Bakersfield High School. He attended the University of Utah and began his pro career in the Cubs' organization in 1961. Cowan threw and batted right-handed, standing 6 feet (1.8 m) tall and weighing 170 pounds (77 kg), during his playing career.

== Baseball career ==
Cowan was promoted to the Cubs in September 1963 after three stellar seasons in the minor leagues. After smashing 35 home runs at two levels in 1962, he was selected the 1963 Most Valuable Player and an all-star of the Triple-A Pacific Coast League, pacing the circuit in runs batted in (120). In 1964, Cowan was the Cubs' starting center fielder, appearing in 134 games and starting 127 in the position. He also hit an MLB-career-high 19 home runs. But he struck out 128 times (second in the National League), posted a poor .241 batting average and led the Senior Circuit by committing 11 errors in center field. During the off-season, he was traded to the Mets for former Cub all-star outfielder George Altman.

Cowan was a utility outfielder, occasional infielder, and pinch hitter for the remainder of his MLB career, and spent two full seasons (1966 and 1968) back in the minors. He had success coming off the Angels' bench during his 173-game tenure, batting .278 with 13 home runs. He retired after his final big-league game on April 24, 1972, when he struck out as a pinch hitter against Paul Lindblad.

Cowan's 281 MLB hits included 44 doubles, eight triples, and 40 home runs. He batted .236 lifetime.
