= Joshua Fuentes =

American baseball player (born 1993)

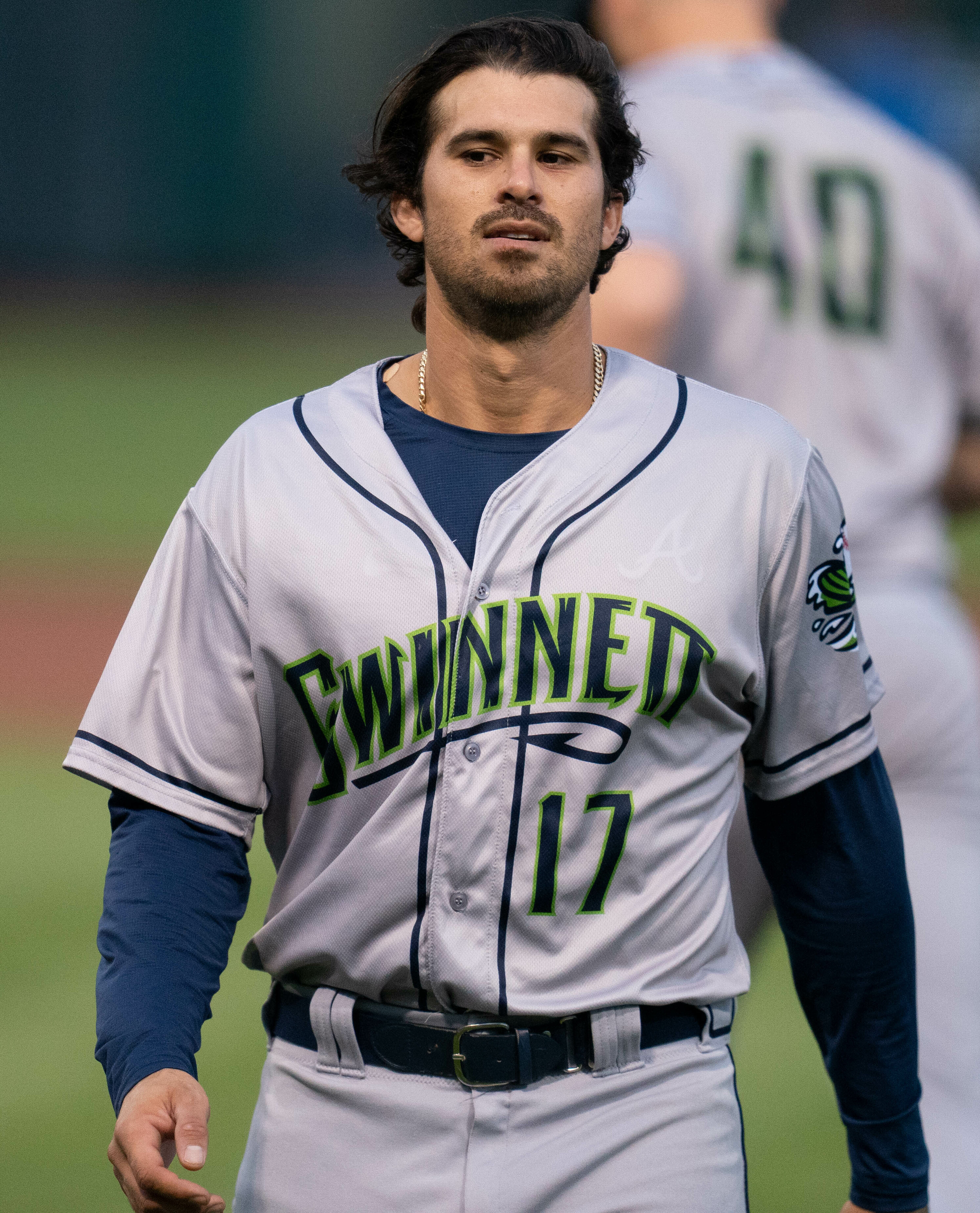
- Fuentes with the Gwinnett Stripers in 2023

Charros de Jalisco – No. 19
- First baseman
- Born: February 19, 1993 (age 33); Rancho Santa Margarita, California, U.S.
- Bats: Right Throws: Right

MLB debut
- April 6, 2019, for the Colorado Rockies

MLB statistics (through 2021 season)
- Batting average: .243
- Home runs: 12
- Runs batted in: 57
- Stats at Baseball Reference

Teams
- Colorado Rockies (2019–2021)

Joshua Luis Fuentes (born February 19, 1993) is an American professional baseball first baseman for the Charros de Jalisco of the Mexican League. He has previously played in Major League Baseball (MLB) for the Colorado Rockies from 2019 to 2021.

== Amateur career ==
Fuentes attended Trabuco Hills High School in Mission Viejo, California and played college baseball at Saddleback College and Missouri Baptist University.

== Professional career ==
=== Colorado Rockies ===
==== Minor leagues ====
On June 11, 2014, Fuentes signed with the Colorado Rockies as an undrafted free agent. He made his professional debut with the Low-A Tri-City Dust Devils and spent the whole season there, batting .260 with one home run and 16 RBI in 41 games. He played 2015 with the Single-A Asheville Tourists, compiling a .252 batting average with six home runs and 42 RBI in 93 games.

Fuentes split the 2016 campaign between Asheville and the High-A Modesto Nuts where he slashed a combined .307/.366/.505 with 13 home runs and 64 RBI in 105 total games between both affiliates. He spent the 2017 season with the Double-A Hartford Yard Goats where he batted .307 with 15 home runs, 72 RBI, and a .869 OPS in 122 games and started 2018 with the Triple-A Albuquerque Isotopes.

==== Major leagues ====
On November 20, 2018, the Rockies added Fuentes to their 40-man roster to protect him from the Rule 5 draft. He was promoted to the major leagues on April 6, 2019, and made his major league debut that night. Fuentes recorded a pinch-hit single versus Yimi García in his first major league at bat. Fuentes took over the first base job during the 2020 season, and his offensive production was among the best on the team. In 30 games, he hit .306 with two home runs and 17 RBI.

After a slow start to 2021 Fuentes was named National League Player of the Week on May 17, batting .500 for the week and tying a Rockies record for most consecutive games with an RBI. During the middle of the season, Fuentes hit a rough patch in which he ended up losing his starting role on the team and ultimately was demoted to Triple-A. He ended the season hitting .225 with seven home runs and 33 RBI in 95 games. On October 21, Fuentes was outrighted off of the 40-man roster. He elected free agency on November 7.

=== Toronto Blue Jays ===
On March 26, 2022, Fuentes signed a minor league contract with the Toronto Blue Jays. In 29 appearances for the Triple-A Buffalo Bisons, hitting .162/.205/.200 with one home run, five RBI, and one stolen base. Fuentes was released by the Blue Jays organization on May 23.

=== Leones de Yucatán ===
On June 14, 2022, Fuentes signed with the Leones de Yucatán of the Mexican League. In 41 games, he slashed .299/.364/.576 with 10 home runs and 27 RBI. Fuentes won the Mexican League Championship with the Leones .

=== Atlanta Braves ===
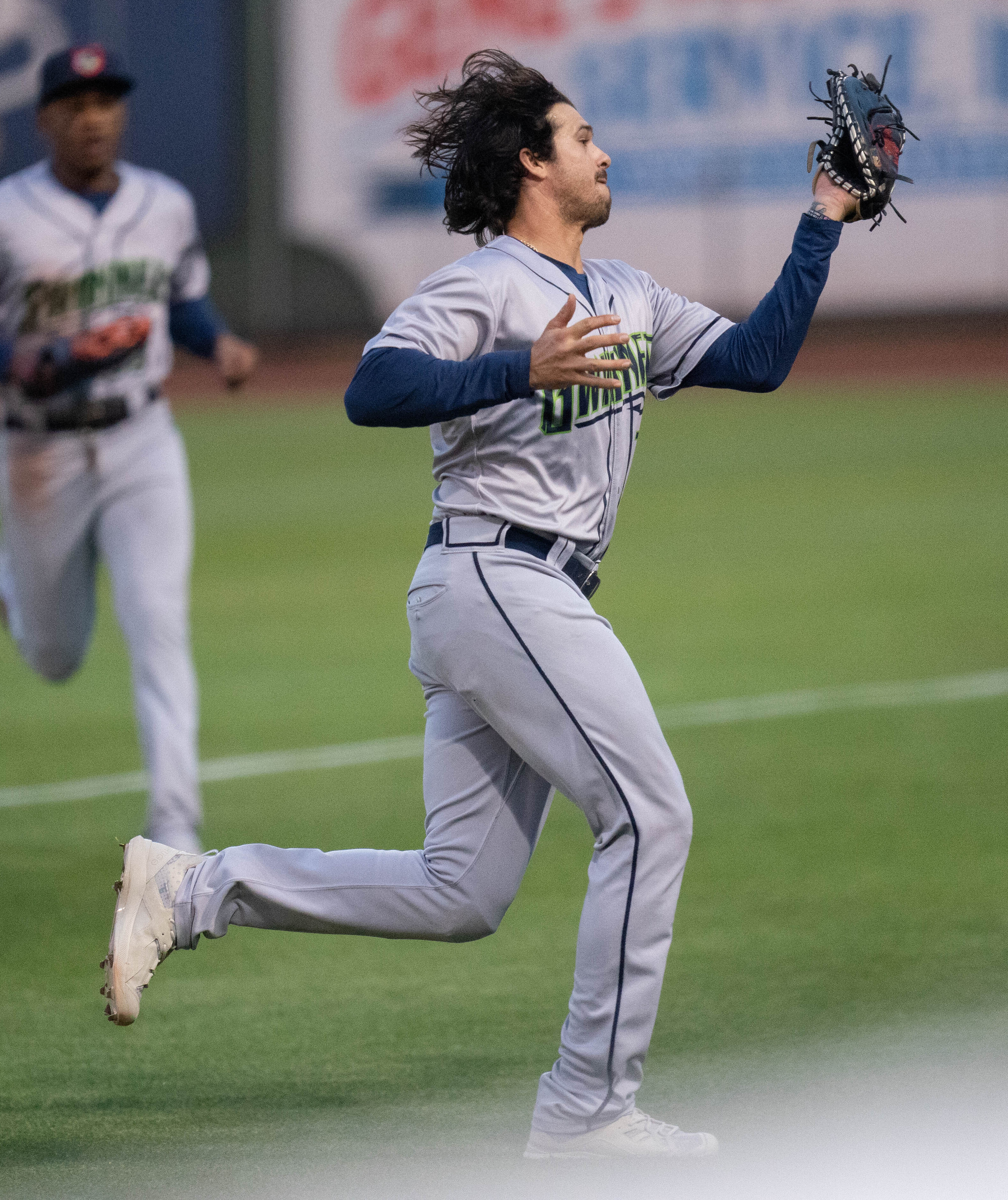
Fuentes with the Gwinnett Stripers.

On December 23, 2022, Fuentes signed a minor league contract with the Atlanta Braves. He spent most of the 2023 season with the Triple-A Gwinnett Stripers, also playing in four games for the Double-A Mississippi Braves. In 65 games for Gwinnett, Fuentes batted .228/.300/.339 with 5 home runs and 29 RBI. He elected free agency following the season on November 6.

=== Leones de Yucatán (second stint) ===
On February 13, 2024, Fuentes signed with the Leones de Yucatán of the Mexican League. In 67 appearances for Yucatán, he slashed .208/.255/.290 with three home runs, 19 RBI, and one stolen base.

Fuentes made 27 appearances for Yucatán in 2025, batting .209/.287/.275 with one home run and five RBI.

=== Charros de Jalisco ===
On May 26, 2025, Fuentes was traded to the Charros de Jalisco of the Mexican League. In 46 games he hit .248/.319/.368 with 2 home runs, 18 RBIs and one stolen base.

== Personal life ==
Fuentes is of Cuban descent. His cousin, Nolan Arenado, plays for the Arizona Diamondbacks.
