= 2020 Arizona Diamondbacks season =

Major League Baseball shortened 60-game season

2020 Arizona Diamondbacks
- League: National League
- Division: West
- Ballpark: Chase Field
- City: Phoenix, Arizona
- Record: 25–35 (.417)
- Divisional place: 5th
- Owners: Ken Kendrick
- General managers: Mike Hazen
- Managers: Torey Lovullo
- Television: Fox Sports Arizona (Steve Berthiaume, Bob Brenly, Greg Schulte)
- Radio: KMVP-FM (98.7) (Greg Schulte, Tom Candiotti, Mike Ferrin); KHOV-FM (105.1, Spanish)
- Stats: ESPN.com; Baseball Reference

The 2020 Arizona Diamondbacks season was the franchise's 22nd season in Major League Baseball and their 22nd season at Chase Field in Phoenix, Arizona as members of the National League West. They were managed by Torey Lovullo in his fourth season with the franchise.

On March 12, 2020, MLB announced that because of the ongoing COVID-19 pandemic, the start of the regular season would be delayed by at least two weeks in addition to the remainder of spring training being cancelled. Four days later, it was announced that the start of the season would be pushed back indefinitely due to the recommendation made by the CDC to restrict events of more than 50 people for eight weeks.

On June 23, MLB commissioner Rob Manfred unilaterally implemented a 60-game season. Players reported to training camps on July 1 in order to resume spring training and prepare for a July 24 Opening Day.

The Diamondbacks finished the season 25–35, giving them their first losing season since 2016.

== Offseason ==
=== Transactions ===
October 31, 2019	Matt Herges hired as a pitching coach
August 31, 2020	Traded LHP Robbie Ray and Cash Considerations to Toronto for LHP Travis Bergen
August 31, 2020	Traded RHP Archie Bradley and Cash Considerations to Cincinnati for OF Josh VanMeter and Stuart Fairchild
August 31, 2020	Traded OF Starling Marte to Miami for LHP Caleb Smith, RHP Humberto Mejía and a Player to be named later
August 31, 2020	Traded LHP Andrew Chafin and Cash Considerations to Chicago for a Player to be named later

== Season standings ==
=== National League West ===
NL West
Team	W	L	Pct.	GB	Home	Road
Los Angeles Dodgers	43	17	.717	—	21‍–‍9	22‍–‍8
San Diego Padres	37	23	.617	6	21‍–‍11	16‍–‍12
San Francisco Giants	29	31	.483	14	19‍–‍14	10‍–‍17
Colorado Rockies	26	34	.433	17	12‍–‍18	14‍–‍16
Arizona Diamondbacks	25	35	.417	18	16‍–‍14	9‍–‍21

=== National League Wild Card ===
Division leaders
Team	W	L	Pct.
Los Angeles Dodgers	43	17	.717
Atlanta Braves	35	25	.583
Chicago Cubs	34	26	.567

Division 2nd place
Team	W	L	Pct.
San Diego Padres	37	23	.617
St. Louis Cardinals	30	28	.517
Miami Marlins	31	29	.517

Wild Card teams (Top 2 teams qualify for postseason)
Team	W	L	Pct.	GB
Cincinnati Reds	31	29	.517	+2
Milwaukee Brewers	29	31	.483	—
San Francisco Giants	29	31	.483	—
Philadelphia Phillies	28	32	.467	1
Washington Nationals	26	34	.433	3
New York Mets	26	34	.433	3
Colorado Rockies	26	34	.433	3
Arizona Diamondbacks	25	35	.417	4
Pittsburgh Pirates	19	41	.317	10

== Record vs. opponents ==
2020 National League record Source: MLB Standings Grid – 2020
Team	AZ	COL	LAD	SD	SF	AL
Arizona	—	5–5	2–8	5–5	2–8	11–9
Colorado	5–5	—	3–7	3–7	6–4	9–11
Los Angeles	8–2	7–3	—	6–4	6–4	16–4
San Diego	5–5	7–3	4–6	—	8–2	13–7
San Francisco	8–2	4–6	4–6	2–8	—	11–9

=== Detailed records ===
National League West
Opponent	Total	Home	Away	RS	RA
Arizona Diamondbacks	–	–	–	–	–
Colorado Rockies	5–5	3–4	2–1	74	57
Los Angeles Dodgers	2–8	2–5	0–3	34	55
San Diego Padres	5–5	3–0	2–5	34	46
San Francisco Giants	2–8	1–2	1–6	27	47
Total	14–26	9–11	5–15	169	205

American League West
Opponent	Total	Home	Away	RS	RA
Houston Astros	3–3	2–1	1–2	31	28
Los Angeles Angels	2–1	–	2–1	21	21
Oakland Athletics	2–2	2–0	0–2	16	13
Seattle Mariners	1–2	1–2	–	10	17
Texas Rangers	3–1	2–0	1–1	22	11
Total	11–9	7–3	4–6	100	90

== Game log ==
On April 18–19, 2020, the Diamondbacks were supposed to take on the San Diego Padres in the Mexico Series at Alfredo Harp Helú Stadium in Mexico City. But due to the pandemic, on March 19, the MLB cancelled the series.

2020 Game Log 25–35 (Home: 16–14; Away: 9–21)
July: 3–5 (Home: 1–1; Away: 2–4)

#	Date	Opponent	Score	Win	Loss	Save	Record	Streak
1	July 24	@ Padres	2–7	Paddack (1–0)	**Bumgarner** (0–1)	—	0–1	L1
2	July 25	@ Padres	1–5	Lamet (1–0)	**Ray** (0–1)	—	0–2	L2
3	July 26	@ Padres	4–3	**Bradley** (1–0)	Yates (0–1)	—	1–2	W1
4	July 27	@ Padres	2–6	Quantrill (1–0)	**Weaver** (0–1)	—	1–3	L1
5	July 28	@ Rangers	4–1	**Kelly** (1–0)	Gibson (0–1)	**Bradley** (1)	2–3	W1
6	July 29	@ Rangers	4–7	Hernández (1–0)	**Chafin** (0–1)	Goody (1)	2–4	L1
7	July 30	Dodgers	3–6	Stripling (2–0)	**Ray** (0–2)	Báez (1)	2–5	L2
8	July 31	Dodgers	5–3	**Rondón** (1–0)	Treinen (0–1)	**Bradley** (2)	3–5	W1

August: 11–16 (Home: 8–8; Away: 3–8)

#	Date	Opponent	Score	Win	Loss	Save	Record	Streak
9	August 1	Dodgers	2–11	Urías (1–0)	**Weaver** (0–2)	—	3–6	L1
10	August 2	Dodgers	0–3	Kershaw (1–0)	**Kelly** (1–1)	Jansen (2)	3–7	L2
11	August 4	Astros	2–8	Javier (1–0)	**Bumgarner** (0–2)	—	3–8	L3
12	August 5	Astros	14–7	**Ray** (1–2)	McCullers Jr. (1–1)	—	4–8	W1
13	August 6	Astros	5–4	**Guerra** (1–0)	Pressly (0–1)	—	5–8	W2
14	August 7	@ Padres	0–3	Davies (2–1)	**Weaver** (0–3)	Yates (2)	5–9	L1
15	August 8	@ Padres	3–2	**Kelly** (2–1)	Paddack (2–1)	**Bradley** (3)	6–9	W1
16	August 9	@ Padres	5–9	Lamet (2–0)	**Bumgarner** (0–3)	—	6–10	L1
17	August 10	@ Rockies	12–8	**Young** (1–0)	Gray (0–2)	**Bradley** (4)	7–10	W1
18	August 11	@ Rockies	7–8	Estévez (1–0)	**Ginkel** (0–1)	Bard (1)	7–11	L1
19	August 12	@ Rockies	13–7	**Chafin** (1–1)	Kinley (0–1)	—	8–11	W1
20	August 14	Padres	5–1	**Kelly** (3–1)	Lamet (2–1)	—	9–11	W2
21	August 15	Padres	7–6	**Crichton** (1–0)	Johnson (1–1)	**Bradley** (5)	10–11	W3
22	August 16	Padres	5–4	**Clarke** (1–0)	Pagán (0–1)	**Bradley** (6)	11–11	W4
23	August 17	Athletics	4–3	**Crichton** (2–0)	Soria (2–1)	—	12–11	W5
24	August 18	Athletics	10–1	**Weaver** (1–3)	Montas (2–2)	—	13–11	W6
25	August 19	@ Athletics	1–4	Luzardo (2–0)	**Kelly** (3–2)	Hendriks (8)	13–12	L1
26	August 20	@ Athletics	1–5	Manaea (1–2)	**Young** (1–1)	—	13–13	L2
27	August 21	@ Giants	2–6	Webb (2–2)	**Ray** (1–3)	—	13–14	L3
28	August 22	@ Giants	1–5	Anderson (1–1)	**Grace** (0–1)	—	13–15	L4
29	August 23	@ Giants	1–6	Baragar (3–1)	**Weaver** (1–4)	—	13–16	L5
30	August 24	Rockies	2–3	Castellani (1–1)	**Widener** (0–1)	Bard (2)	13–17	L6
31	August 25	Rockies	4–5	Díaz (1–1)	**Crichton** (2–1)	Bard (3)	13–18	L7
32	August 26	Rockies	7–8	Gray (2–3)	**Ray** (1–4)	Hoffman (1)	13–19	L8
—	August 27	Rockies	Postponed (Boycotts due to Jacob Blake shooting); Makeup: September 25					
33	August 28	Giants	7–4	**Gallen** (1–0)	Anderson (1–2)	—	14–19	W1
34	August 29	Giants	2–5	García (2–1)	**Weaver** (1–5)	Rogers (2)	14–20	L1
35	August 30	Giants	1–4	Watson (1–0)	**Crichton** (2–2)	Coonrod (1)	14–21	L2

September: 11–14 (Home: 7–5; Away: 4–9)

#	Date	Opponent	Score	Win	Loss	Save	Record	Streak
36	September 1	@ Dodgers	3–6	Urías (3–0)	**Young** (1–2)	Jansen (10)	14–22	L3
37	September 2	@ Dodgers	2–3 (10)	Jansen (2–0)	**Guerra** (1–1)	—	14–23	L4
38	September 3	@ Dodgers	1–5	Kershaw (5–1)	**Weaver** (1–6)	—	14–24	L5
39	September 4	@ Giants	6–5	**Bergen** (1–0)	Anderson (1–3)	**Ginkel** (1)	15–24	W1
40	September 5	@ Giants	3–4	Barager (4–1)	**Bumgarner** (0–1)	Watson (1)	15–25	L1
41	September 6	@ Giants	2–4	Baragar (5–1)	**Young** (1–3)	Rogers (3)	15–26	L2
42	September 7	@ Giants	2–4	Gausman (3–2)	**Gallen** (1–1)	Coonrod (2)	15–27	L3
43	September 8	Dodgers	9–10 (10)	Jansen (3–0)	**López** (0–1)	—	15–28	L4
44	September 9	Dodgers	4–6 (10)	McGee (3–1)	**Ginkel** (0–2)	Treinen (1)	15–29	L5
45	September 10	Dodgers	5–2	**Smith** (1–0)	Gonsolin (0–1)	**Bergen** (1)	16–29	W1
46	September 11	Mariners	4–3	**Young** (2–3)	Kikuchi (2–3)	**Crichton** (1)	17–29	W2
47	September 12	Mariners	3–7	Sheffield (3–3)	**Gallen** (1–2)	—	17–30	L1
48	September 13	Mariners	3–7	Sadler (1–0)	**Weaver** (1–7)	—	17–31	L2
49	September 15	@ Angels	9–8	**Mella** (1–0)	Andriese (2–3)	**Crichton** (2)	18–31	W1
50	September 16	@ Angels	9–6	**Clarke** (2–0)	Bundy (5–3)	**Crichton** (3)	19–31	W2
51	September 17	@ Angels	3–7	Canning (1–3)	**Young** (2–4)	—	19–32	L1
52	September 18	@ Astros	6–3	**Gallen** (2–2)	García (0–1)	**Crichton** (4)	20–32	W1
53	September 19	@ Astros	2–3	Paredes (3–2)	**Weaver** (1–8)	Pressly (11)	20–33	L1
54	September 20	@ Astros	2–3	Taylor (2–1)	**Guerra** (1–2)	Pressly (12)	20–34	L2
55	September 22	Rangers	7–0	**Smith** (2–0)	Lyles (1–6)	—	21–34	W1
56	September 23	Rangers	7–3	**Mella** (2–0)	Goody (0–2)	—	22–34	W2
57	September 25	Rockies	4–0 (7)	**Gallen** (3–2)	Senzatela (5–3)	**Crichton** (5)	23–34	W3
58	September 25	Rockies	11–5 (7)	**Clarke** (3–0)	Santos (0–1)	—	24–34	W4
59	September 26	Rockies	3–10	Márquez (4–6)	**Weaver** (1–9)	—	24–35	L1
60	September 27	Rockies	11–3	**Bumgarner** (1–4)	Freeland (2–3)	—	25–35	W1

Legend: = Win = Loss = Postponement
Bold = Diamondbacks team member

== Roster ==
2020 Arizona Diamondbacks
Roster
Pitchers: 59 Jeremy Beasley; 47 Travis Bergen; 61 Silvino Bracho; 25 Archie Bradley; 40 Madison Bumgarner; 47 Andrew Chafin; 45 Taylor Clarke; 58 Stefan Crichton; 23 Zac Gallen; 37 Kevin Ginkel; 33 Matt Grace; 41 Junior Guerra; 29 Merrill Kelly; 54 Artie Lewicki; 50 Yoan López; 36 Joe Mantiply; 64 Keury Mella; 35 Joel Payamps; 38 Robbie Ray; 28 Héctor Rondón; 31 Caleb Smith; 46 Riley Smith; 24 Luke Weaver; 57 Taylor Widener; 49 Alex Young	Catchers: 18 Carson Kelly; 21 Stephen Vogt; Infielders: 13 Nick Ahmed; 32 Kevin Cron; 5 Eduardo Escobar; 22 Jake Lamb; 4 Ketel Marte; 27 Wyatt Mathisen; 10 Josh Rojas; 26 Pavin Smith; 15 Ildemaro Vargas; 19 Josh VanMeter; 53 Christian Walker; 14 Andy Young	Outfielders: 56 Kole Calhoun; 9 Jon Jay; 16 Tim Locastro; 2 Starling Marte; 6 David Peralta; 12 Daulton Varsho	Manager: 17 Torey Lovullo; Coaches: 83 Dan Butler (bullpen catcher); 11 Darnell Coles (hitting); 43 Mike Fetters (bullpen); 7 Robby Hammock (quality control/catching); 70 Matt Herges (pitching); 77 Eric Hinske (assistant hitting); 39 Dave McKay (first base); 3 Tony Perezchica (third base); 84 Humberto Quintero (bullpen catcher); 60 Luis Urueta (bench)

== Player stats ==
=== Batting ===
Note: G = Games played; AB = At bats; R = Runs; H = Hits; 2B = Doubles; 3B = Triples; HR = Home runs; RBI = Runs batted in; SB = Stolen bases; BB = Walks; AVG = Batting average; SLG = Slugging average

Player	G	AB	R	H	2B	3B	HR	RBI	SB	BB	AVG	SLG
Christian Walker	57	218	35	59	18	1	7	34	1	19	.271	.459
David Peralta	54	203	19	61	10	1	5	34	1	13	.300	.433
Eduardo Escobar	54	203	22	43	7	3	4	20	1	15	.212	.335
Nick Ahmed	57	199	29	53	10	1	5	29	4	18	.266	.402
Kole Calhoun	54	190	35	43	9	0	16	40	1	28	.226	.526
Ketel Marte	45	181	19	52	14	1	2	17	1	7	.287	.409
Starling Marte	33	122	23	38	8	1	2	14	5	10	.311	.443
Carson Kelly	39	122	11	27	5	0	5	19	0	6	.221	.385
Daulton Varsho	37	101	16	19	5	2	3	9	3	12	.188	.366
Stephen Vogt	26	72	6	12	5	0	1	7	0	8	.167	.278
Tim Locastro	33	69	15	20	4	1	2	7	4	8	.290	.464
Josh Rojas	17	61	9	11	0	0	0	2	1	7	.180	.180
Jon Jay	18	50	5	8	1	0	1	4	0	3	.160	.240
Jake Lamb	18	43	2	5	1	0	0	1	0	6	.116	.140
Pavin Smith	12	37	7	10	0	1	1	4	1	5	.270	.405
Josh VanMeter	12	36	6	7	2	0	1	5	0	4	.194	.333
Wyatt Mathisen	9	27	5	6	0	0	2	5	0	5	.222	.444
Andrew Young	12	26	3	5	2	0	1	4	0	5	.192	.385
Ildemaro Vargas	8	20	2	3	0	0	0	0	0	1	.150	.150
Kevin Cron	8	17	0	0	0	0	0	0	0	1	.000	.000
Team totals	60	1997	269	482	101	12	58	255	23	181	.241	.391

=== Pitching ===
Note: W = Wins; L = Losses; ERA = Earned run average; G = Games pitched; GS = Games started; SV = Saves; IP = Innings pitched; H = Hits allowed; R = Runs allowed; ER = Earned runs allowed; BB = Walks allowed; SO = Strikeouts

Player	W	L	ERA	G	GS	SV	IP	H	R	ER	BB	SO
Zac Gallen	3	2	2.75	12	12	0	72.0	55	24	22	25	82
Luke Weaver	1	9	6.58	12	12	0	52.0	63	39	38	18	55
Alex Young	2	4	5.44	15	7	0	46.1	51	30	28	14	39
Taylor Clarke	3	0	4.36	12	5	0	43.1	35	23	21	21	40
Madison Bumgarner	1	4	6.48	9	9	0	41.2	47	31	30	13	30
Merrill Kelly	3	2	2.59	5	5	0	31.1	26	9	9	5	29
Robbie Ray	1	4	7.84	7	7	0	31.0	31	27	27	31	43
Stefan Crichton	2	2	2.42	26	0	5	26.0	22	7	7	9	23
Junior Guerra	1	2	3.04	25	0	0	23.2	17	10	8	15	21
Héctor Rondón	1	0	7.65	23	0	0	20.0	25	18	17	11	23
Taylor Widener	0	1	4.50	12	0	0	20.0	14	10	10	12	22
Yoan López	0	1	5.95	20	0	0	19.2	21	15	13	9	16
Riley Smith	2	0	1.47	6	0	0	18.1	15	3	3	5	18
Kevin Ginkel	0	2	6.75	19	0	1	16.0	21	13	12	13	18
Caleb Smith	0	0	2.45	4	3	0	11.0	5	3	3	6	12
Archie Bradley	1	0	4.22	10	0	6	10.2	13	5	5	3	12
Keury Mella	2	0	1.80	11	0	0	10.0	10	3	2	3	10
Travis Bergen	1	0	4.05	7	0	1	6.2	4	3	3	8	8
Andrew Chafin	1	1	8.10	11	0	0	6.2	9	6	6	4	10
Artie Lewicki	0	0	5.40	2	0	0	3.1	7	2	2	1	5
Joel Payamps	0	0	3.00	2	0	0	3.0	2	2	1	3	2
Joe Mantiply	0	0	15.43	4	0	0	2.1	3	4	4	4	2
Matt Grace	0	1	54.00	3	0	0	1.0	5	6	6	2	2
Silvino Bracho	0	0	18.00	1	0	0	1.0	2	2	2	0	1
Carson Kelly	0	0	0.00	1	0	0	1.0	1	0	0	0	0
Jeremy Beasley	0	0	0.00	1	0	0	0.1	2	0	0	0	1
Team totals	25	35	4.84	60	60	13	518.1	506	295	279	235	524

== Minor league affiliations ==
Level	Team	League	Location
AAA	Reno Aces	Pacific Coast League	Reno, Nevada
AA	Jackson Generals	Southern League	Jackson, Tennessee
Advanced A	Visalia Rawhide	California League	Visalia, California
A	Kane County Cougars	Midwest League	Geneva, Illinois
Short Season A	Hillsboro Hops	Northwest League	Hillsboro, Oregon
Rookie	Missoula PaddleHeads	Pioneer League	Missoula, Montana
Rookie	AZL D-backs	Arizona League	Scottsdale, Arizona
Rookie	DSL D-backs	Dominican Summer League	Boca Chica, Dominican Republic
