= Chandler Harnish =

American football player (born 1988)

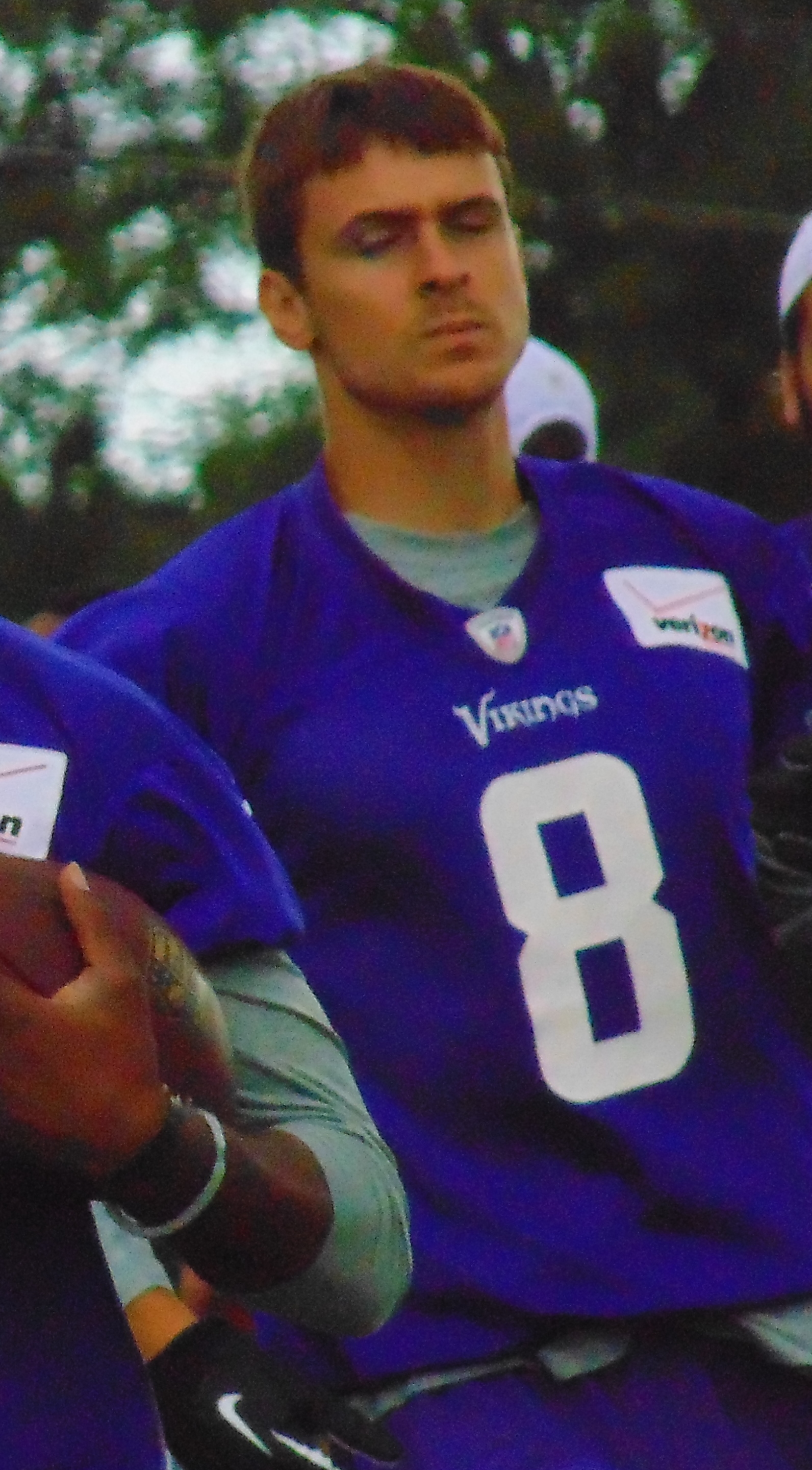
- Harnish with the Minnesota Vikings in 2014

Profile
- Position: Quarterback

Personal information
- Born: July 28, 1988 (age 38); Bluffton, Indiana, U.S.
- Listed height: 6 ft 0 in (1.83 m)
- Listed weight: 223 lb (101 kg)

Career information
- High school: Norwell (Ossian, Indiana)
- College: Northern Illinois (2007–2011)
- NFL draft: 2012: 7th round, 253rd overall pick

Career history
- Indianapolis Colts (2012–2013); Minnesota Vikings (2014); Arizona Cardinals (2015)*
- * Offseason or practice squad member only

Awards and highlights
- MAC Most Valuable Player (2011); MAC Offensive Player of the Year (2011); First-team All-MAC (2010)
- Stats at Pro Football Reference

Chandler Harnish (born July 28, 1988) is an American former professional football quarterback. He was the final pick of the 2012 NFL draft, selected 253rd overall by the Indianapolis Colts, becoming Mr. Irrelevant 2012. He played college football for Northern Illinois University, where he was the Huskies' starting quarterback for four years. Harnish was also a member of the Minnesota Vikings and Arizona Cardinals.

== Early life ==
A native of Bluffton, Indiana, Harnish attended Norwell High School in Ossian, Indiana, where he was a letterman in football, basketball, and track. At Norwell, he passed for 4,760 yards and 48 touchdowns, and ran for 2,343 yards and 35 touchdowns. He was also a safety where he tallied 129 tackles, seven fumble recoveries, five forced fumbles, and 13 pass deflections. He holds multiple Norwell High School records, including career all-purpose yards (7,103). As a senior, he led the Norwell Knights to a 14–1 record and the runner-up spot in the Indiana 3A state championship. Harnish was awarded the 2006 3A Phil N. Eskew Mental Attitude Award and was named an all-state player and the Fort Wayne News Sentinel Athlete of the Year as a senior. Also, along with his brothers and sister, Chandler ran a sweet corn stand in Bluffton.

He also competed in basketball and track at Norwell. In basketball, Harnish earned all-conference honors as a junior and as a senior. In track & field, Harnish was one of the state's top performers in the sprinting and throwing events. In sprints, he recorded times of 11.26 seconds in the 100 meters and 23.16 seconds in the 200 meters. He was also a conference, sectional, and regional discus champion who finished sixth in the Indiana State Finals as a junior, with a top throw of 52.71 meters.

Regarded as a two-star recruit by Rivals.com, Harnish's only scholarship offer came from Northern Illinois, which he accepted.

College recruiting
Name	Hometown	School	Height	Weight	40^{‡}	Commit date
Chandler Harnish; QB	Bluffton, Indiana	Norwell High School	6 ft 2 in (1.88 m)	209 lb (95 kg)	4.66	Aug 6, 2006
Chandler Harnish; QB	Recruit ratings: Scout: Rivals:					
Overall recruit ranking: Scout: – (QB) Rivals: – (QB), 12 (IN)
‡ Refers to 40-yard dash; Note: In many cases, Scout, Rivals, 247Sports, On3, and ESPN may conflict in their listings of height, weight and 40 time.; In these cases, the average was taken. ESPN grades are on a 100-point scale.; Sources: "2007 Team Ranking". Rivals.com.

== College career ==
On August 6, 2006, Harnish committed to Northern Illinois University (NIU), the only FBS school that made him a scholarship offer.

Despite not being heavily recruited out of high school, Harnish became one of the greatest quarterbacks in NIU history. He made his first start in the Huskies' first game of his freshman season. In that game, he nearly led the team to an upset over the Big Ten's Minnesota Golden Gophers. Harnish continued to be the Huskies' starter for four straight years. He led the Huskies to a bowl game in all four years that he started, an achievement that surpassed the combined total of Division I bowl appearances by all other NIU quarterbacks before him.

In his first three years at NIU (2008–2010), he started 31 games and totaled 7,332 yards of total offense, including 5,728 passing yards and 1,604 rushing yards. He was selected as a first-team All-Mid-American Conference (MAC) player after the 2010 season, and also received the Vern Smith Leadership Award, as the best football player in the MAC. He was voted MVP of the 2010 Humanitarian Bowl after posting 300 passing yards and a touchdown in the 40–17 victory.

During the 2011 regular season, Harnish had 4,043 yards of total offense, including 1,351 rushing yards and 2,692 passing yards. Midway through his senior year, he broke NIU's program record for combined touchdowns, a mark which had stood for the previous 48 years, and was selected to the Davey O'Brien Award Watch List. Playing against Western Michigan on October 15, 2011, Harnish became only the 10th player in NCAA Division I FBS history with a 200–200 game, consisting of at least 200 rushing yards and 200 passing yards. He rushed for a career-high 229 yards and passed for 203 yards in a 55–21 win over the Broncos.

Harnish's average of 7.9 yards per carry during the 2011 regular season ranked third among players in the NCAA Football Bowl Subdivision with at least 100 carries.

Harnish accumulated more than 11,000 yards of total offense in his four years at Northern Illinois. He averaged 337 yards of total offense per game in 2011, ranking 7th in the Football Bowl Subdivision. In November 2011, he was named one of 15 semifinalists for the Walter Camp Award as the best player in college football.

=== College statistics ===
Season	Team	GP	Passing								Rushing			
Season	Team	GP	Cmp	Att	Pct	Yds	Avg	TD	Int	Rtg	Att	Yds	Avg	TD
2008	Northern Illinois	10	118	211	55.9	1,528	7.2	8	9	120.7	118	539	4.6	4
2009	Northern Illinois	10	143	223	64.1	1,670	7.5	11	6	137.9	89	229	2.6	2
2010	Northern Illinois	11	189	292	64.7	2,530	8.7	21	5	157.8	137	836	6.1	7
2011	Northern Illinois	12	237	384	61.7	3,216	8.4	28	6	153.0	194	1,379	7.1	11
Totals		43	687	1,110	61.9	8,944	8.1	68	26	150.8	538	2,983	5.5	24

== Professional career ==
Pre-draft measurables
Height	Weight	40-yard dash	10-yard split	20-yard split	20-yard shuttle	Three-cone drill	Vertical jump	Broad jump
6 ft 2 in (1.88 m)	219 lb (99 kg)	4.68 s	1.60 s	2.65 s	4.15 s	6.78 s	32.5 in (0.83 m)	9 ft 4 in (2.84 m)

=== Indianapolis Colts ===
Harnish was selected in the seventh round (253rd overall) by the Indianapolis Colts in the 2012 NFL draft. As the last pick in the draft, he was given the mock title of Mr. Irrelevant. On October 16, Harnish was released by Indianapolis, after being inactive for five regular season games. He was re-signed to the team's practice squad two days later, but did not participate in any games during the 2012 NFL season. He competed for the backup job against Matt Hasselbeck in the 2013 preseason, but was waived and later signed to the practice squad. He signed a reserve/futures contract on January 14, 2014, and was expected to be the backup to number one overall pick Andrew Luck. He was released by the Colts on August 30, 2014.

=== Minnesota Vikings ===
On September 29, 2014, Harnish signed with the Minnesota Vikings, who placed him on their practice squad after starting quarterback Matt Cassel was placed on injured reserve and Teddy Bridgewater had sprained his ankle. On October 2, 2014, Harnish was put on the active roster to back up Christian Ponder in the Green Bay Packers game after Bridgewater, who was injured in the previous game against the Atlanta Falcons, was deactivated for the game. Harnish was waived the next day. On October 7, 2014, Harnish was re-signed to the Vikings practice squad and quarterback McLeod Bethel-Thompson was released. On December 16, 2014, Harnish was released by the Vikings.

=== Arizona Cardinals ===
Harnish signed with the Arizona Cardinals on March 31, 2015. During the 2015 NFL draft, he read the name of the 2015 Mr. Irrelevant, Gerald Christian. Harnish was released by the Cardinals on August 8, 2015.
