= Norwell High School (Indiana) =

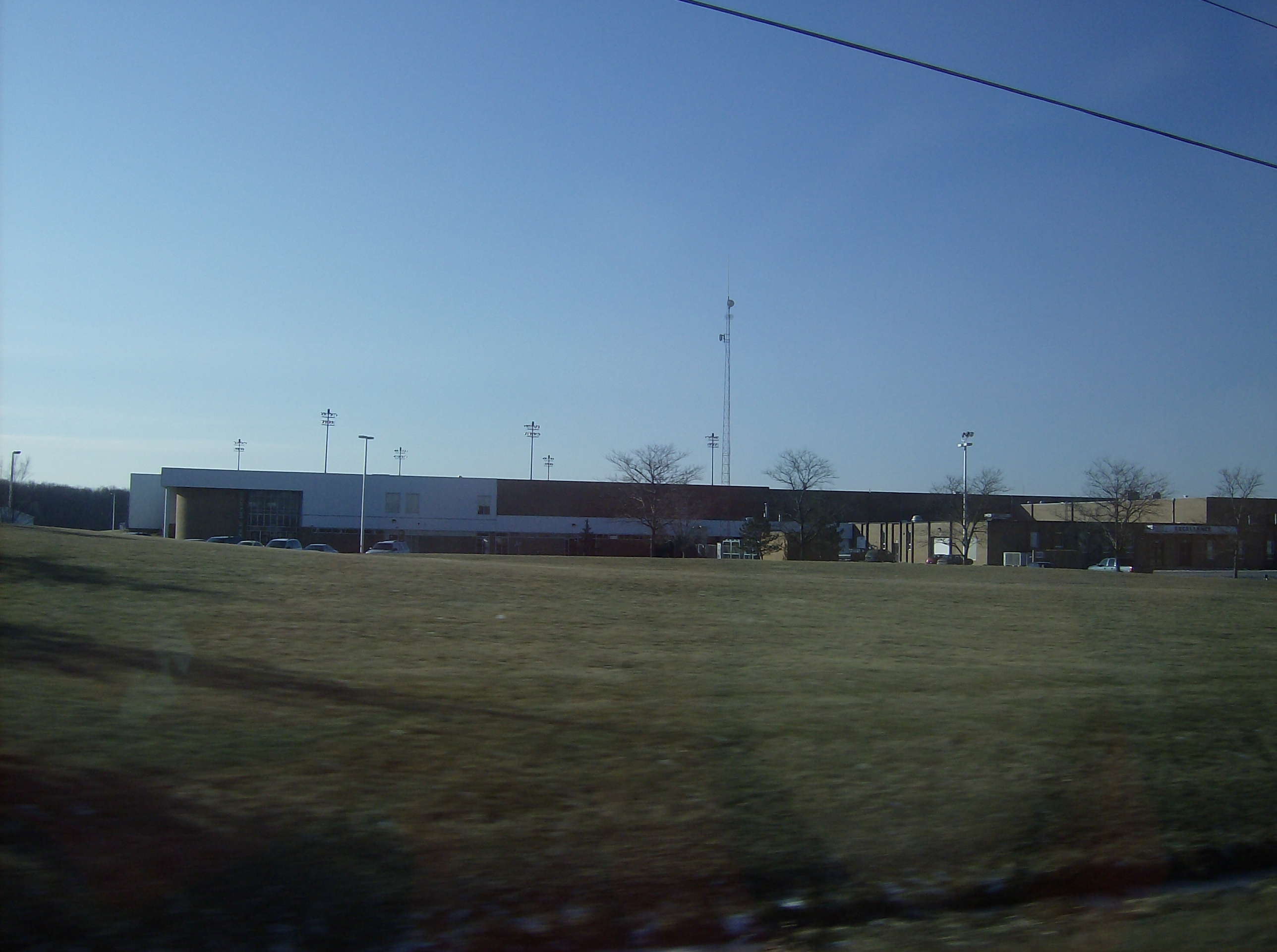

Location
- 1100 E. US Highway 224; Ossian, Wells County, Indiana 46777; United States
- 40°49′42″N 85°12′09″W

Information
- Type: Public high school
- Motto: Excellence. Pride. Tradition.
- Established: 1967
- School district: Norwell Community Schools
- Principal: Kameron Meyer
- Faculty: 43.50 (FTE)
- Enrollment: 745 (2023-24)
- Student to teacher ratio: 17.13
- Colors: Navy, gold, and white
- Athletics conference: Northeast Eight Conference
- Team name: Knights
- Website: NHS

Norwell High School, short for Northern Wells High School, is a public high school located approximately 4 miles southwest of Ossian, Indiana, United States.

== About ==
Norwell High School opened in the fall of 1967 after a consolidation between Ossian and Lancaster Central High Schools. The first graduating class, the Class of 1968, was separated between the two schools while construction was completed on the current campus. The Class of 1969 was the first to graduate from the school at its current location.

The school serves the entire Norwell Community Schools school district. The district is located in the northern part of Wells County, running from IN 124 north. Norwell High School is centrally located in the school district at US 224 and county road 100 E.

Norwell has an athletic background in participation in the Northeast Eight (NE8).

The school operates on a traditional seven-period system.

== Athletics ==
The Knights were the IHSAA 3A baseball state champions in 2003, 2007, and 2013.

In 2025, the girls' basketball team won their first state championship, competing in the 3A class.

In 1999 and 2006, the football team placed 2nd in the state championships in the 3A class. The Phil N. Eskew & Blake Ress Mental Attitude Award has been given to two students, Nicholas Worden in 1999 and Chandler Harnish in 2006.

== Musical Arts ==
The concert band received the ISSMA High School All Music Award in 2006, 2014, 2016, 2017, and 2018.

The Norwell Marching Knights won the ISSMA State Finals in Class C in 2002, 2005, and 2006.

The winter percussion won the IPA State Finals in the Percussion Scholastic Open division in 2004 and 2007.

The winter color guard won the 2016 MEPA Circuit Championships, competing in Scholastic Regional A.

The Norwell Knight Stars show choir placed 6th and won Best Crew in the 2015 FAME National Finals in the unisex division.

== Notable alumni ==
- Chandler Harnish, professional football player, quarterback for Northern Illinois, MVP of 2010 Humanitarian Bowl, "Mr. Irrelevant" in 2012 NFL draft
- Matt Kinzer, professional baseball player, MLB St. Louis Cardinals, professional football player, NFL Detroit Lions
- Jarrod Parker, professional baseball player, MLB Oakland Athletics
- David Rupel, television producer and writer
- Josh VanMeter, professional baseball player, MLB Arizona Diamondbacks

== See also ==
- List of high schools in Indiana
