= Josh VanMeter =

American baseball player (born 1995)

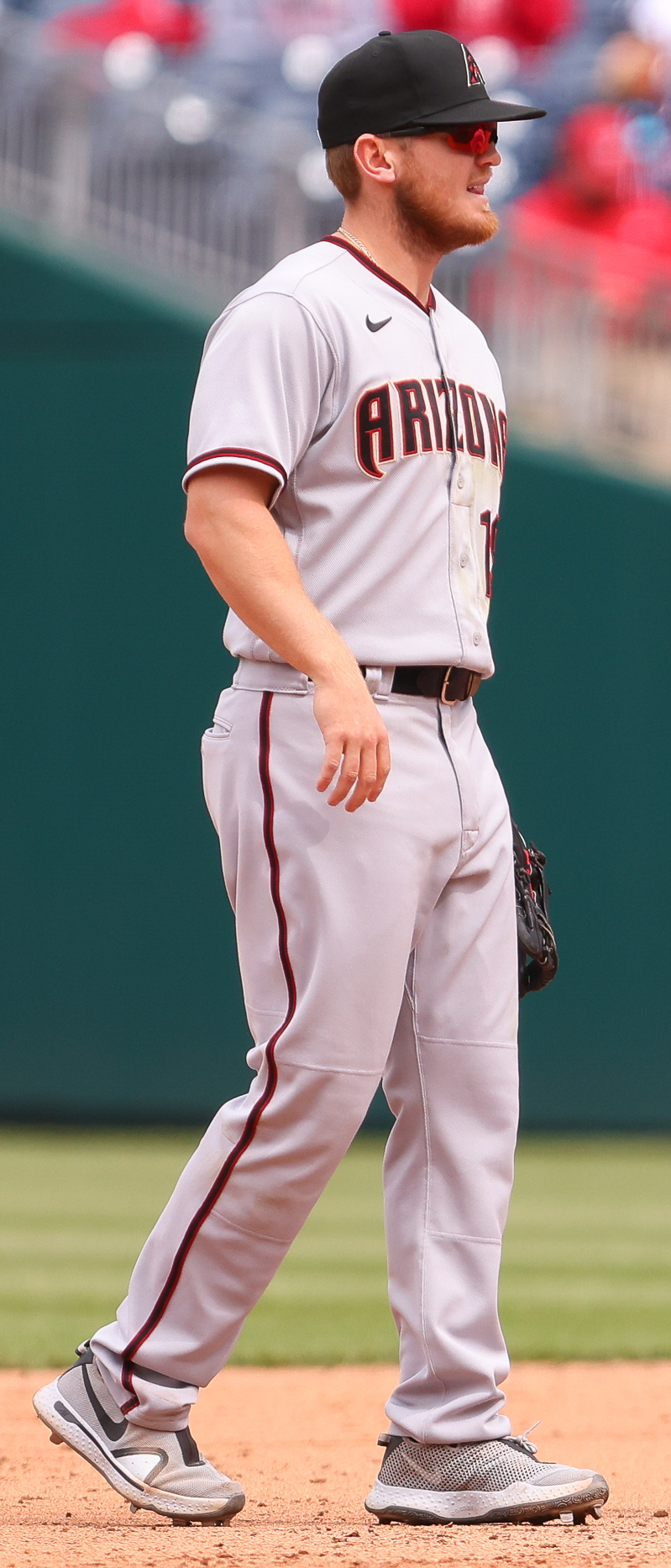
- VanMeter with the Arizona Diamondbacks in 2021
- Second baseman / Outfielder
- Born: March 10, 1995 (age 31); Ossian, Indiana, U.S.
- Batted: Left Threw: Right

MLB debut
- May 5, 2019, for the Cincinnati Reds

Last MLB appearance
- September 4, 2022, for the Pittsburgh Pirates

MLB statistics
- Batting average: .206
- Home runs: 19
- Runs batted in: 79
- Stats at Baseball Reference

Teams
- Cincinnati Reds (2019–2020); Arizona Diamondbacks (2020–2021); Pittsburgh Pirates (2022)

Joshua Michael VanMeter (born March 10, 1995) is an American former professional baseball left fielder and infielder. He played in Major League Baseball (MLB) for the Cincinnati Reds, Arizona Diamondbacks, and Pittsburgh Pirates.

== Career ==
=== San Diego Padres ===
VanMeter graduated from Norwell High School and was selected by the San Diego Padres in the 5th round of the 2013 Major League Baseball draft. He signed with the Padres, forgoing his commitment to play college baseball at Illinois State University. He spent 2013 with the Arizona League Padres where he slashed .278/.378/.348 with ten RBIs in 44 games. In 2014, he played for the Fort Wayne TinCaps where he batted .254 with three home runs and 39 RBIs in 116 games, and in 2015, he returned to Fort Wayne but played in only 25 games due to injury. He spent 2016 with both the Lake Elsinore Storm and San Antonio Missions and compiled a combined .251 batting average with 14 home runs and 56 RBIs in 124 total games between the two teams.

=== Cincinnati Reds ===
On December 9, 2016, VanMeter was traded to the Cincinnati Reds as the player to be named later for Luis Torrens. The Reds assigned him to the Pensacola Blue Wahoos and he spent the whole 2017 season there, batting .255/.326/.352 with five home runs, 54 RBIs and 15 stolen bases in 132 games. VanMeter spent 2018 with both Pensacola and the Louisville Bats, slashing a combined .260/.337/.454 with 12 home runs and 59 RBIs in 128 total games between both teams. He returned to Louisville to begin 2019.

On May 5, 2019, VanMeter was promoted to the major leagues for the first time, and made his major league debut against the San Francisco Giants. On July 20, against the St. Louis Cardinals, he hit his first major league home run.

=== Arizona Diamondbacks ===
On August 31, 2020, VanMeter was traded alongside Stuart Fairchild in a deal with the Arizona Diamondbacks for Archie Bradley. In 12 games with the Diamondbacks, VanMeter slashed .194/.294/.333 with 1 home run and 5 RBI.

In 2021, VanMeter batted .212/.297/.354 with 6 home runs and 36 RBIs in 112 games. He was designated for assignment on March 27, 2022.

=== Pittsburgh Pirates ===
On March 31, 2022, VanMeter was traded to the Pittsburgh Pirates in exchange for Listher Sosa. On May 7, in a game against the Cincinnati Reds, VanMeter was used as an emergency catcher for the final inning of the 9–2 loss. He was forced into action after Roberto Pérez suffered a season-ending hamstring injury and Andrew Knapp was given his first career ejection after arguing a check swing call. On May 22, in a blowout loss against the St. Louis Cardinals, VanMeter pitched the ninth inning for the team, allowing four hits and five runs, including a pair of home runs.

On September 6, VanMeter was designated for assignment. He cleared waivers and was sent outright to the Triple–A Indianapolis Indians on September 10. In 67 games for Pittsburgh, batted .187 with 3 home runs and 14 RBI. VanMeter elected free agency following the season on October 6.

=== Milwaukee Brewers ===
On January 9, 2023, VanMeter signed a minor league deal with the Milwaukee Brewers. In 46 games for the Triple-A Nashville Sounds, he batted .199/.400/.362 with 6 home runs and 20 RBI. On September 24, following multiple stints on the injured list, VanMeter was released by the Brewers organization.

=== New York Yankees ===
On January 17, 2024, VanMeter signed a minor league contract with the New York Yankees. In 59 games for the Triple–A Scranton/Wilkes-Barre RailRiders, he hit .177/.335/.293 with three home runs, 27 RBI, and five stolen bases. VanMeter was released by the Yankees organization on August 12.

VanMeter announced his retirement from professional baseball via his X page on January 20, 2025.
