= 2010 Humanitarian Bowl =

2010 UDrove Humanitarian Bowl
- 14th Humanitarian Bowl
- New Humanitarian Bowl Logo
| Northern Illinois Huskies | Fresno State Bulldogs |
| (10–3) | (8–4) |
| MAC | WAC |
| 40 | 17 |
| Head coach: Tom Matukewicz (interim) | Head coach: Pat Hill |
| | 1 | 2 | 3 | 4 | Total |
|---|---|---|---|---|---|
| Northern Illinois | 6 | 17 | 10 | 7 | 40 |
| Fresno State | 7 | 3 | 0 | 7 | 17 |
- Date: December 18, 2010
- Season: 2010
- Stadium: Bronco Stadium
- Location: Boise, Idaho
- MVP: QB Chandler Harnish, NIU
- Favorite: NIU by 1
- Referee: Dan Romeo (Big 12)
- Attendance: 25,449
- Payout: US$750,000 per team

United States TV coverage
- Network: ESPN
- Announcers: Carter Blackburn, Brock Huard, Mike Bellotti and Shelley Smith
- Nielsen ratings: 1.8 / 2.89M

The 2010 Humanitarian Bowl (officially known as the UDrove Humanitarian Bowl) was the fourteenth edition of the college football bowl game, and was played at Bronco Stadium in Boise, Idaho, on the campus of Boise State University. The game started at 3:30 pm MST on Saturday, December 18, 2010 and was telecast on ESPN. The game featured the Fresno State Bulldogs from the Western Athletic Conference (WAC) versus the Northern Illinois Huskies from the Mid-American Conference (MAC). Despite the resignation of Jerry Kill, the Huskies' third-year coach, Northern Illinois defeated Fresno State 40–17.

UDrove was the new title sponsor of the game. UDrove is affiliated with the game's previous sponsor, Roady's Truck Stops.

== Teams ==
=== Northern Illinois Huskies ===
Northern Illinois made its third straight bowl appearance and played in a postseason game for the sixth time in the last seven seasons. The Huskies were ranked in the top 25 in the BCS after winning nine straight games and went undefeated in the Mid-American Conference during the regular season. NIU is led by senior running back Chad Spann, who was voted the Mid-American Conference Offensive Player of the Year and took home league MVP honors. Spann led the MAC with 1,293 yards on 226 carries and is tied for second in the Football Bowl Subdivision with 20 rushing touchdowns, a NIU single-season record.

=== Fresno State Bulldogs ===
Fresno State was invited to the Humanitarian Bowl after posting an 8–4 regular season record. Fresno State won their season finale against Illinois, 25–23. Since 2000 the Bulldogs have won 17 games against teams from BCS Conferences. This was the 3rd time that Fresno State appeared in the Humanitarian Bowl. They entered the game with a 2–0 record in the bowl game with a 37–34 OT win over Virginia in 2004 and a 40–28 victory over Georgia Tech in 2007.

== Game notes ==
=== Scoring summary ===
| Scoring Play | Score |
|---|---|
1st Quarter
| FRES - Ryan Colburn 11-yard pass to Jamel Hamler (Kevin Goessling kick), 5:25 | FRES 7–0 |
| NIU - Chandler Harnish 7-yard run (Missed kick), 3:10 | FRES 7–6 |
2nd Quarter
| NIU - Chandler Harnish 28-yard run (Michael Cklamovski kick), 14:20 | NIU 13–7 |
| NIU - Michael Cklamovski 45 yard kick, 9:14 | NIU 16–7 |
| FRES - Kevin Goessling 45 yard kick, 3:41 | NIU 16–10 |
| NIU - Chandler Harnish 22-yard pass to Kyle Skarb (Michael Cklamovski kick), 0:57 | NIU 23–10 |
3rd Quarter
| NIU - Michael Cklamovski 51 yard kick, 10:13 | NIU 26–10 |
| NIU - Chad Spann 18-yard run (Michael Cklamovski kick), 1:14 | NIU 33–10 |
4th Quarter
| NIU - Chad Spann 8-yard run (Michael Cklamovski kick), 12:16 | NIU 40–10 |
| FRES - Ryan Colburn 11-yard pass to Rashad Evans (Kevin Goessling kick), 5:31 | NIU 40–17 |

=== Statistics ===
| Statistics | NIU | Fresno |
|---|---|---|
| First downs | 22 | 26 |
| Rushes–yards (net) | 28–203 | 35–74 |
| Passing yards (net) | 300 | 288 |
| Passes, Comp–Att–Int | 17–27–0 | 28–38–0 |
| Total offense, plays–yards | 55–503 | 73–362 |
| Time of possession | 24:07 | 35:53 |

== Notes ==
Fresno State and Northern Illinois faced each other four previous times. The series was tied 2-2. NIU won in 1973 by a score of 24–15 in Fresno and then in 1990 in DeKalb 73–18. Fresno was victorious in 1972 in DeKalb by a score of 9–6 and then in Fresno in 1991 55–7.
