= Travis Bergen =

American baseball player (born 1993)

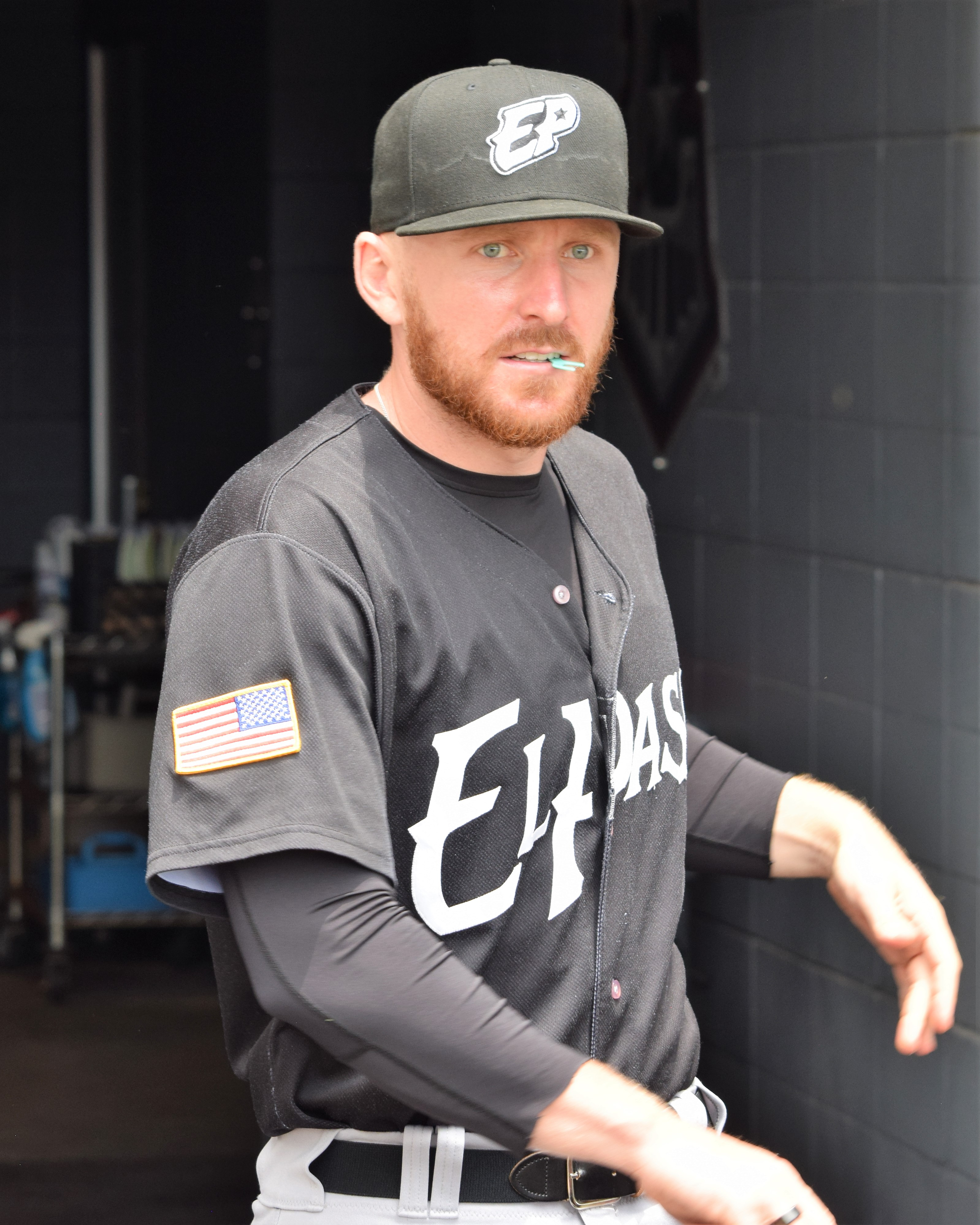
- Bergen with the El Paso Chihuahuas in 2022
- Pitcher
- Born: October 8, 1993 (age 32); McDonough, Georgia, U.S.
- Batted: Left Threw: Left

MLB debut
- March 29, 2019, for the San Francisco Giants

Last MLB appearance
- May 23, 2021, for the Toronto Blue Jays

MLB statistics
- Win–loss record: 5–0
- Earned run average: 3.96
- Strikeouts: 35
- Stats at Baseball Reference

Teams
- San Francisco Giants (2019); Toronto Blue Jays (2020); Arizona Diamondbacks (2020); Toronto Blue Jays (2021)

Travis Michael Bergen (born October 8, 1993) is an American former professional baseball pitcher. He played in Major League Baseball (MLB) for the San Francisco Giants, Arizona Diamondbacks, and Toronto Blue Jays.

== Amateur career ==
Bergen attended Union Grove High School in McDonough, Georgia. In 2012, as a senior, he pitched to a 6–1 win–loss record with a 1.42 earned run average (ERA) in 38 1/3 innings. Undrafted out of high school, he played college baseball at Kennesaw State University. In 2014, he played collegiate summer baseball with the Bourne Braves of the Cape Cod Baseball League and was named a league all-star. In 2015, his junior season, he went 6–4 with a 3.15 ERA in 14 starts. He was the Owls' team captain and named to the Atlantic Sun Conference All-First Team.

== Professional career ==
=== Toronto Blue Jays ===
Bergen was drafted by the Toronto Blue Jays in the seventh round of the 2015 Major League Baseball draft. He made his professional debut with the Low-A Vancouver Canadiens. Bergen pitched in only 14 games combined in 2016 and 2017 for Vancouver and the Rookie-level Gulf Coast Blue Jays due to injuries. In 2018 he played for the High-A Dunedin Blue Jays and Double-A New Hampshire Fisher Cats, combining to go 4–2 with a 0.95 ERA and 74 strikeouts in 56 2/3 innings pitched.

=== San Francisco Giants ===
On December 13, 2018, Bergen was selected by the San Francisco Giants with the eighth pick in the Rule 5 draft. He made his major league debut on March 29, 2019 against the San Diego Padres. He retired Ian Kinsler on a ground ball, the only batter he faced. He was placed on the 10-day injured list with a shoulder strain on May 21. On August 18, Bergen was designated for assignment.

=== Toronto Blue Jays (second stint) ===
On August 21, 2019, Bergen was returned to the Toronto Blue Jays organization and placed on the reserve list of the Triple-A Buffalo Bisons. On August 24, 2020, Bergen's contract was selected to the major league roster.

=== Arizona Diamondbacks ===
On August 31, 2020, the Blue Jays traded Bergen to the Arizona Diamondbacks for Robbie Ray and $300,000. In 6 2/3 innings, Bergen allowed 3 runs, struck out 8, and walked 8. On February 26, 2021, the Diamondbacks designated Bergen for assignment.

=== Toronto Blue Jays (third stint) ===
On February 28, 2021, Bergen was acquired by the Blue Jays in exchange for cash considerations. Bergen recorded a 1.69 ERA in 10 2/3 innings of work for Toronto before he designated for assignment on June 29. He was outrighted to Triple-A Buffalo on July 4. On October 5, Bergen elected free agency.

=== San Diego Padres ===
On March 18, 2022, Bergen signed a minor league contract with the San Diego Padres. In 25 appearances for the Triple-A El Paso Chihuahuas, he compiled a 4–0 record and 4.07 ERA with 27 strikeouts across 24 1/3 innings pitched. Bergen was released by the Padres on August 8.

== Personal life ==
Bergen and his wife, Elise, were married in 2019. They had a child in 2021.
