= Stuart Fairchild =

American baseball player (born 1996)

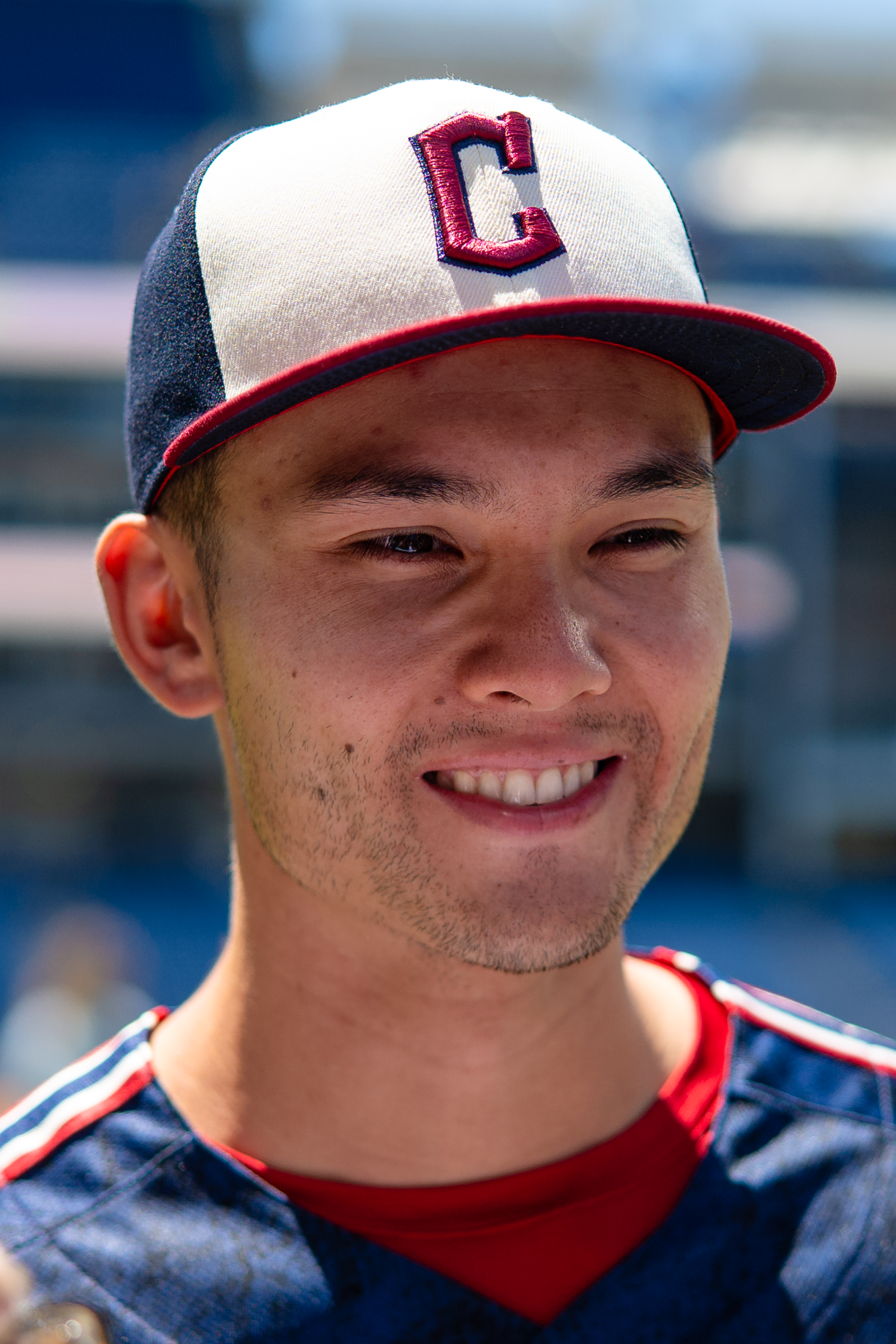
- Fairchild with the Cleveland Guardians in 2026

Free agent
- Outfielder
- Born: March 17, 1996 (age 30); Seattle, Washington, U.S.
- Bats: Right Throws: Right

MLB debut
- July 6, 2021, for the Arizona Diamondbacks

MLB statistics (through 2026 season)
- Batting average: .221
- Home runs: 18
- Runs batted in: 69
- Stats at Baseball Reference

Teams
- Arizona Diamondbacks (2021); Seattle Mariners (2022); San Francisco Giants (2022); Cincinnati Reds (2022–2024); Atlanta Braves (2025); Cleveland Guardians (2026); Seattle Mariners (2026)

Stuart Alexander Fairchild (born March 17, 1996) is an American professional baseball outfielder who is a free agent. He has previously played in Major League Baseball (MLB) for the Arizona Diamondbacks, Seattle Mariners, San Francisco Giants, Cincinnati Reds, Atlanta Braves, and Cleveland Guardians. Fairchild played college baseball for the Wake Forest Demon Deacons, and was selected by the Cincinnati Reds in the second round of the 2017 MLB draft. He made his MLB debut with the Arizona Diamondbacks in 2021.

== Amateur career ==
Fairchild attended Seattle Preparatory School in the Capitol Hill neighborhood of Seattle, Washington, and played for the school's baseball team. The Seattle Times named him to their All-Area Team in 2014. In 2012 and 2013 he was named All-Metro Teams by The Seattle Times, and in 2013 and 2014 he was an All-State selection by the Washington State Baseball Coaches Association.

He enrolled at Wake Forest University and played college baseball for the Wake Forest Demon Deacons. In 2016, he played collegiate summer baseball with the Chatham Anglers of the Cape Cod Baseball League. In 2017, his junior year, he slashed .360/.439/.636 with 17 home runs and 67 RBIs in 63 games. In his college career he was a three-time All-ACC pick and All-American, and batted .334/.424/.541 in 176 starts with 53 doubles, four triples, 27 home runs, 155 RBIs, and 230 hits, and was 47-of-57 in stolen-base attempts.

== Professional career ==
=== Cincinnati Reds ===
The Cincinnati Reds selected Fairchild in the second round, 38th overall, of the 2017 MLB draft and signed him for a $1,802,800 signing bonus. He was assigned to the rookie-level Billings Mustangs, where he batted .304/.393/.412 with three home runs, 23 RBI, and 12 stolen bases in 56 games.

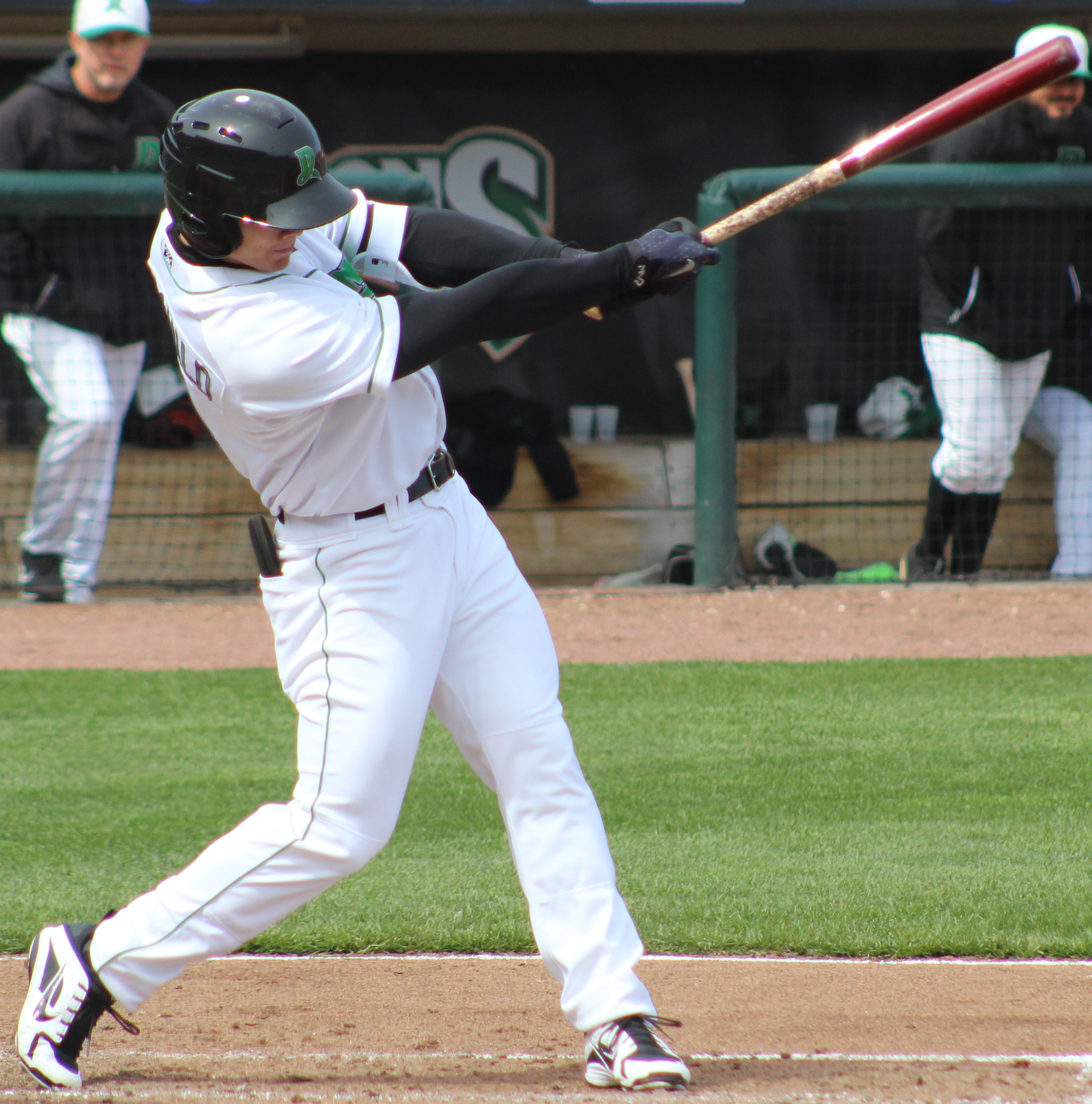
Fairchild with the Dayton Dragons in 2018

Fairchild spent 2018 with the Single-A Dayton Dragons (with whom he earned Midwest League All-Star honors) and the High-A Daytona Tortugas, slashing a combined .264/.344/.407 with nine home runs, 57 RBIs, and 23 stolen bases in 130 games between both clubs. He returned to Daytona to open 2019, and was promoted to the Double-A Chattanooga Lookouts during the season. Over 109 games between both teams, he batted .264/.352/.441 with 12 home runs and 54 RBIs. He played for the Glendale Desert Dogs of the Arizona Fall League after the regular season, batting .353/.405/.471.

Fairchild did not play in a game in 2020 due to the cancellation of the minor league season because of the COVID-19 pandemic.

=== Arizona Diamondbacks ===
On August 31, 2020, the Reds traded Fairchild and Josh VanMeter to the Arizona Diamondbacks for relief pitcher Archie Bradley and cash considerations. The Diamondbacks added Fairchild to their 40-man roster after the season. He was assigned to the Triple-A Reno Aces to begin the 2021 season, for whom he batted .295/.385/.564.

Fairchild was promoted to the major leagues for the first time on July 6, 2021. He made his MLB debut that night as a pinch runner for Stephen Vogt in the bottom of the ninth inning and scored the game-winning run after David Peralta’s walk-off hit by pitch. The next day, Fairchild notched his first career hit, a line drive single off of Colorado Rockies pitcher Lucas Gilbreath; he had 15 major league at bats for the season. Fairchild was designated for assignment on April 19, 2022.

=== Seattle Mariners ===
On April 23, 2022, Fairchild was traded to the Seattle Mariners in exchange for cash considerations. For the Triple-A Tacoma Rainiers, he hit .438/.571/.625 over 16 at-bats. Fairchild logged three hitless at-bats for Seattle. He was designated for assignment on May 12.

=== San Francisco Giants ===
On May 14, 2022, Fairchild was traded to the San Francisco Giants in exchange for infielder Alex Blandino and cash. Fairchild spent five games with both the Triple-A Sacramento River Cats and the Giants, going 3-for-16 in 21 plate appearances for Sacramento, and going hitless in 8 plate appearances for San Francisco. On June 4, Fairchild was designated for assignment by the Giants after Sam Delaplane was added to the roster.

=== Cincinnati Reds (second stint) ===
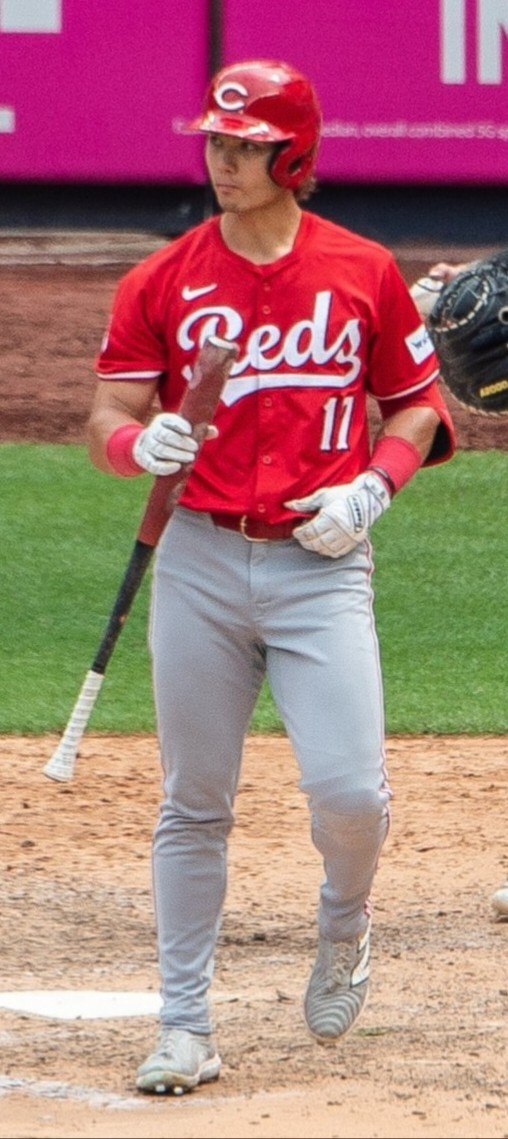
Fairchild with the Cincinnati Reds

On June 11, 2022, Fairchild was claimed off waivers by the Cincinnati Reds. He hit his first MLB home run off Luis Severino of the New York Yankees in his first plate appearance for the Reds on July 13. He played in 38 games for the Reds down the stretch, slashing .279/.374/.523 with 5 home runs and 6 RBI.

Fairchild was optioned to the Triple-A Louisville Bats to begin the 2023 season. Fairchild made it back to the team shortly after the demotion, finishing the season with a .228 batting average and five home runs in 97 games.

In 2024, Fairchild appeared in 94 games for the Reds, slashing .215/.286/.368 with career highs in home runs (8), RBI (30), and stolen bases (13). He was placed on the injured list with a left thumb sprain on August 27. Fairchild was transferred to the 60-day injured list the following day, ending his season.

Fairchild was designated for assignment by the Reds on March 27, 2025.

=== Atlanta Braves ===
On March 31, 2025, Fairchild was traded to the Atlanta Braves for cash considerations. He appeared in 28 games for the Braves, slashing .216/.273/.333 with no home runs and two RBI. On July 21, Fairchild was designated for assignment by Atlanta.

=== Tampa Bay Rays ===
On July 22, 2025, the Braves traded Fairchild to the Tampa Bay Rays in exchange for cash considerations. The following day, Fairchild was placed on the injured list due to a right oblique strain. He was transferred to the 60-day injured list on August 21. Fairchild was activated on November 3, and subsequently designated for assignment. He cleared waivers and elected free agency on November 6.

=== Cleveland Guardians ===
On December 20, 2025, Fairchild signed a minor league contract with the Cleveland Guardians. He began the regular season with the Triple-A Columbus Clippers, batting .289/.417/.479 with five home runs, 15 RBI, and nine stolen bases across his first 40 games. On May 29, 2026, the Guardians selected Fairchild's contract, adding him to their active roster. He made 14 appearances for the team, going 3-for-19 (.158) with one RBI and two stolen bases. Fairchild was designated for assignment by Cleveland following the promotion of Cooper Ingle on June 26. He elected free agency after clearing waivers on July 3.

=== Seattle Mariners (second stint) ===
On July 7, 2026, Fairchild signed a minor league contract with the Seattle Mariners. He made 12 appearances for the Triple-A Tacoma Rainiers, batting .262/.415/.643 with three home runs, six RBI, and two stolen bases. On August 1, the Mariners selected Fairchild's contract, adding him to their active roster. He made one appearance for Seattle as a pinch runner prior to being designated for assignment on August 4; he elected free agency after clearing waivers on August 7. On August 8, he re-signed with the Mariners on a new minor league contract. The Mariners selected Fairchild's contract and added him to their active roster on September 3. Fairchild failed to appear in a game prior to being designated for assignment on September 8. He cleared waivers and was sent outright to Triple-A Tacoma on September 11. He elected free agency on November 2.

== International career ==
Fairchild declined an opportunity to play for Chinese Taipei during the 2023 World Baseball Classic (WBC). He played for the Taiwanese team in the 2026 WWBC. On March 7, he hit a grand slam against Czechia in the top of the second inning, in a game they won 14–0. In that game, Fairchild and teammate Tsung-Che Cheng stole three bases each, contributing to a national team record of eight stolen bases in a single game. Fairchild batted .250 with two home runs in four WBC games.

== Personal life ==
Fairchild's mother moved from Taiwan to the United States when she was 12. Following the 2026 WBC, Fairchild's mother said that her mother was an Amis from Hualien County.

In October 2024, Fairchild announced his engagement.
