= Archie Bradley (baseball) =

American baseball pitcher (born 1992)

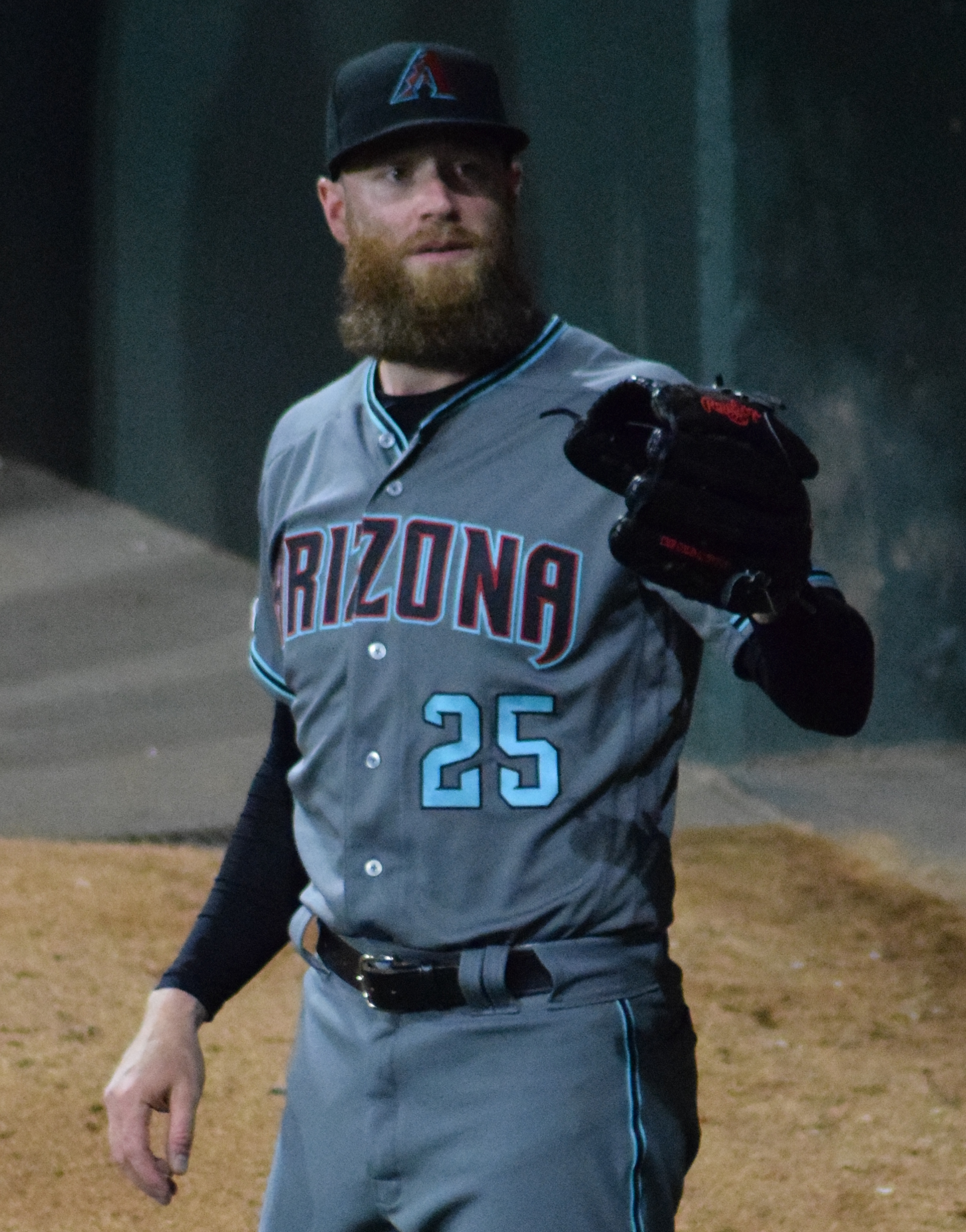
- Bradley with the Arizona Diamondbacks in 2019
- Pitcher
- Born: August 10, 1992 (age 34); Muskogee, Oklahoma, U.S.
- Batted: Right Threw: Right

MLB debut
- April 11, 2015, for the Arizona Diamondbacks

Last MLB appearance
- June 30, 2023, for the Miami Marlins

MLB statistics
- Win–loss record: 30–29
- Earned run average: 4.03
- Strikeouts: 487
- Saves: 32
- Stats at Baseball Reference

Teams
- Arizona Diamondbacks (2015–2020); Cincinnati Reds (2020); Philadelphia Phillies (2021); Los Angeles Angels (2022); Miami Marlins (2023)

Archie Newell Bradley (born August 10, 1992) is an American former professional baseball pitcher. He played nine seasons in Major League Baseball (MLB) for the Arizona Diamondbacks, Cincinnati Reds, Philadelphia Phillies, Los Angeles Angels, and Miami Marlins between 2015 and 2023.

Raised in Muskogee, Oklahoma, Bradley played baseball and football at Muskogee High School and Broken Arrow Senior High School, winning a state championship with Broken Arrow in 2011. That year, the Diamondbacks selected him seventh overall in the 2011 MLB draft, and he spent the next three years in Arizona's farm system. Originally a starting pitcher, Bradley moved to the Diamondbacks' bullpen in 2017, which helped his success as a power pitcher.

After serving as the Diamondbacks' setup man and ultimately their closer, Bradley was traded to the Reds in 2020. He was released into free agency at the end of the season and spent the next three years with the Phillies, Angels, and Marlins. An elbow fracture derailed Bradley's time with the Angels, and he attributed the injury to his poor performance in Miami the following year.

== Early life ==
Bradley was born on August 10, 1992, in Muskogee, Oklahoma. One of five children born to Charles and Pam Bradley, he began playing baseball at the age of four, and started playing gridiron football in elementary school. He was a hyperactive child, and his mother, the local school principal, would place him in classes with teachers that she believed could handle his excess energy.

After spending two years at Muskogee High School, Bradley transferred to Broken Arrow Senior High School for his junior and senior year. In his senior season, Bradley had a 12–1 win–loss record, an earned run average (ERA) of 0.29, a strikeouts per nine innings pitched (K/9) ratio of 17.29, and 137 strikeouts. He also led Broken Arrow in home runs, and had a .395 batting average. Bradley helped lead Broken Arrow to a 36–1 record in 2011, and struck out 14 batters in Broken Arrow's 4–0 shutout state championship victory over Owasso High School. At the end of the year, Bradley was named The Oklahoman's All-State Player of the Year. Along with baseball, Bradley excelled in football, participating in the 2010 Elite 11 quarterback competition. At this competition, Bradley was voted "Most Likely to be a Pro Athlete" by CFB counselors.

== Professional career ==
=== Draft and minor leagues (2011–2014) ===
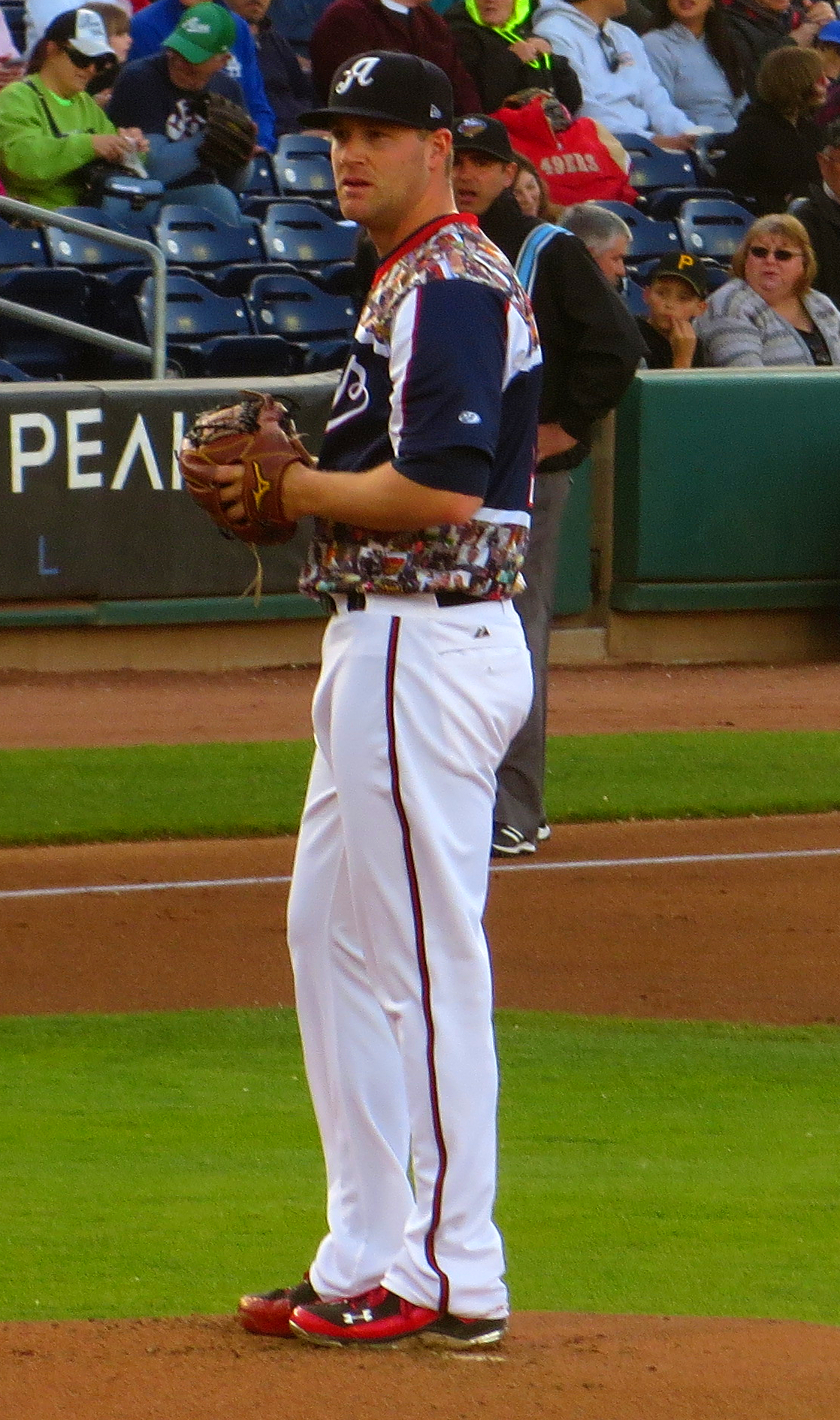
Bradley pitching for the Reno Aces

The Arizona Diamondbacks of Major League Baseball (MLB) selected Bradley seventh overall in the 2011 MLB draft. His friend and Owasso pitching rival Dylan Bundy was selected by the Baltimore Orioles fourth overall, making 2011 the first year that two Oklahoma high school students were drafted in the first round since 1973. At the time, Bradley had already committed to play baseball and football at the University of Oklahoma, and waited until the August 16 deadline to officially sign a $5 million, five-year contract with the Diamondbacks. Bradley spent the remainder of the 2011 season with the Missoula PaddleHeads of the Pioneer League, at that time the Rookie Advanced minor-league affiliate of the Diamondbacks. He appeared in two games for Missoula, including one start, and pitched four strikeouts against seven batters. Additionally, he pitched "about 15 innings" in the Arizona Instructional League.

Bradley started the 2012 season with the Single–A South Bend Silver Hawks, taking the loss in his professional debut on April 6 after giving up one run in five innings of work to the Bowling Green Hot Rods. His first win came on April 12, giving up one run in six innings of a 3–1 victory over the Fort Wayne TinCaps. Bradley spent the entire season at South Bend, accumulating a 12–6 record and a 3.84 ERA in 27 starts and 136 innings of work. His 152-season strikeouts were second in the Midwest League, but he led the league in walks with 82.

Starting 2013 with the High–A Visalia Rawhide, Bradley was named the California League Player of the Week for the week ending April 14, after striking out nine in 5 2/3 shutout innings against the San Jose Giants. He was promoted to the Double-A Mobile BayBears on May 1, after only five starts with Visalia, and took the win the following day in a 3–1 victory over the Huntsville Stars. Bradley pitched in all six innings of the game, which ended early due to inclement weather. He was named the Southern League Pitcher of the Week for the week ending August 4 after pitching the first nine-inning complete game of his career in a 5–1 rout of the Jackson Generals. The following week, he pitched the final inning in a combined no-hitter against Huntsville. Between Visalia and Mobile, Bradley finished the 2013 season with a 14–5 record, a 1.84 ERA, and 162 strikeouts in 152 innings.

After attending spring training with the Diamondbacks, Bradley was assigned to the Triple-A Reno Aces at the beginning of the 2014 season. His agent pushed for Bradley to be called up to the majors, arguing that Bradley was only being kept in the minor leagues to allow the Diamondbacks to retain his original contract for a longer period of time. Diamondbacks general manager Kevin Towers said that promoting Bradley would put unnecessary pressure on the pitcher, as the team had the worst ERA in MLB, and Towers told Fox Sports that, "I know how it would be perceived if he came up: 'Archie is going to save us.'" Bradley missed nearly two months of the 2014 season after sustaining an elbow injury in late April. He began making rehab assignments at the end of June, with a 75-pitch limit. In only 18 season appearances and 83 innings, Bradley posted a 3–7 record, a 4.45 ERA, and 75 strikeouts in 2014.

=== Arizona Diamondbacks (2015–2020) ===
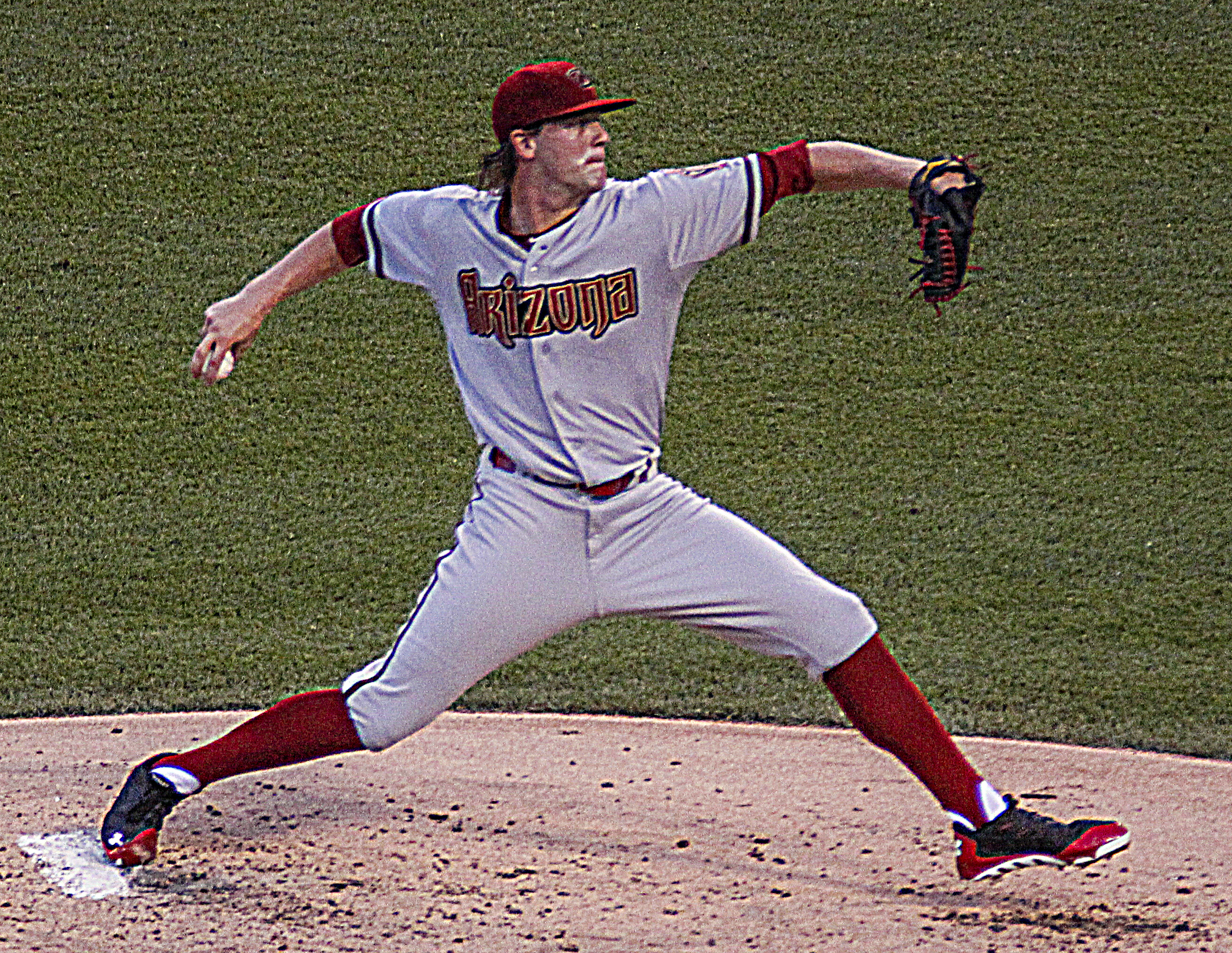
Bradley pitching for Arizona in 2015

After Trevor Cahill was traded to the Atlanta Braves, Diamondbacks chief baseball officer Tony La Russa announced that Bradley would be in the team's 2015 starting rotation. On April 5, 2015, Bradley had his contract selected to the major league roster. He made his MLB debut on April 11, 2015, allowing only one hit in the Diamondbacks' 6–0 shutout of the Los Angeles Dodgers. He outpitched Clayton Kershaw, becoming only the fourth rookie starter since 2003 to win against a reigning Cy Young Award winner in his major league debut. On April 28, Bradley suffered a sinus fracture when he was hit in the face by a line drive off the bat of Colorado Rockies outfielder Carlos González, and he was placed on the 15-day disabled list the next day. Bradley struggled in his return to the mound, allowing four runs in less than three innings in his first start after the injury. He was placed on the disabled list again on June 4 with tendinitis in his shoulder, and began rehab assignments in mid-August. Bradley pitched 35 2/3 innings in eight games for the Diamondbacks in 2015, and posted a 2–3 record with a 5.80 ERA.

Amidst heavy competition for the fifth spot in the starting rotation, Bradley began the 2016 season in Reno. After recording a 1.99 ERA and 10.4 strikeouts per nine innings there, he was called back up on May 29 to replace an injured Shelby Miller, and set a career-high with nine strikeouts in 7 1/3 innings in a 6–3 win against the San Diego Padres. His performance that season was inconsistent, posting a 5.02 ERA and retaining the high walk rate that troubled him the previous season. His largest issues were in finding a usable third pitch to round out his fastball and curveball, and a high batting average against left-handed hitters. In 26 starts for Arizona that season, Bradley posted an 8–9 record, with 143 strikeouts but 79 earned runs allowed.

In 2017, the Diamondbacks had an unusually strong starting rotation, including Zack Greinke, Patrick Corbin, and Robbie Ray, and, rather than sending Bradley back down to the minor leagues, the team moved him to the bullpen. In his first appearance in his new role, Bradley relieved Randall Delgado in the fifth inning of a game against the San Francisco Giants, striking out seven batters in 3 1/3 shutout innings. He chose to remain in the bullpen even after Shelby Miller was optioned to the minor leagues, and began serving as the Diamondbacks' setup man. In the 2017 National League Wild Card Game, Bradley hit a two-RBI triple against Pat Neshek of the Colorado Rockies, helping Arizona advance to the 2017 National League Division Series. It was Bradley's first extra-base hit in his major league career and the first postseason triple by a reliever in MLB history. In his first season as a reliever, Bradley posted a 3–3 record and a 1.73 ERA in 73 innings.

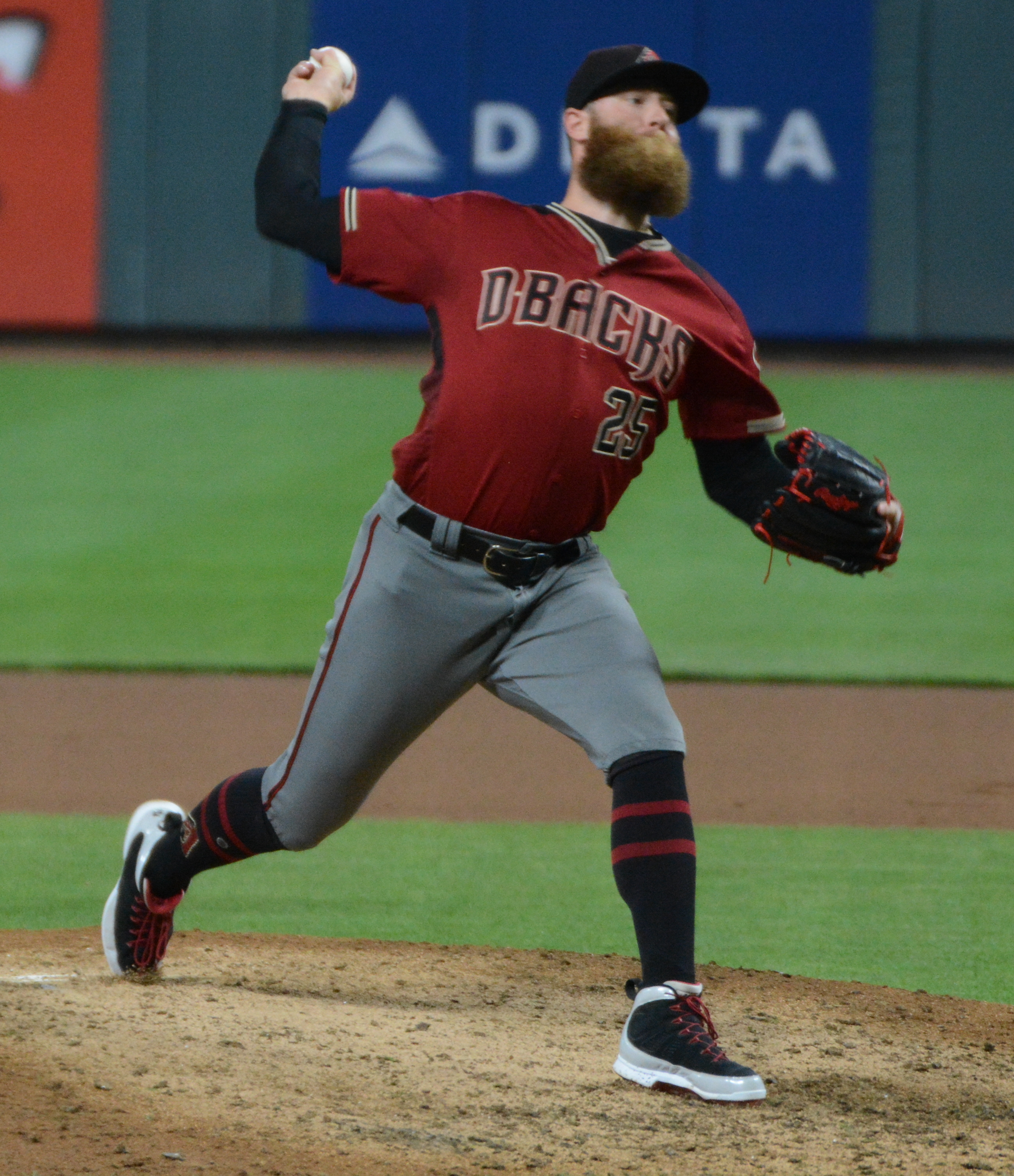
Bradley pitching for the Diamondbacks in 2018

Going into the 2018 season, Diamondbacks general manager Mike Hazen said that, while Bradley's role in the pitching lineup had not been formally addressed, it was likely that he would remain a reliever. Nearer to the start of the season, Bradley was considered for the role of closer, in contention with Brad Boxberger and Yoshihisa Hirano. Manager Torey Lovullo said that, while Bradley "was exceptional last year in the role he was in ... the other thought is he's ready to take the next step". His season took a turn on July 20, when he gave up six runs to the Colorado Rockies, including a grand slam off the bat of Raimel Tapia. Entering the game, Bradley had given up only 10 earned runs in 45 2/3 innings of work. His difficulties throughout the remainder of the season were later attributed to a cracked fingernail on his right index finger, which made it difficult for him to grip his signature curveball and forced him to rely more on his fastball. The Diamondbacks' bullpen collapsed in September, with Bradley, Jake Diekman, Matt Andriese, and Andrew Chafin all allowing at least as many runs as innings pitched. Bradley ended up going 4–5 for the season, with a 3.64 ERA, three saves, and 75 strikeouts in 71 2/3 innings.

Bradley's troubles continued into the beginning of the 2019 season, in which it took ten appearances before he recorded a clean eighth inning for the Diamondbacks. His poor performance began to lead to speculation that he would be removed from his role as setup man. The following year, Bradley revealed to Arizona Sports 98.7 FM that, after giving up 32 hits, 16 walks, and 20 earned runs in May and June, Lovullo and Hazen called him in for a meeting and discussed how to return him to form without demoting him to the minors. His performance improved after the meeting, and after Greg Holland was designated for assignment that August, Bradley stepped up to close for the Diamondbacks. He posted a 4–5 record and 18 saves in 2019, with a 3.52 ERA and 87 strikeouts in 66 appearances, including 32 games finished.

During the 2020 offseason, Bradley underwent contract arbitration, arguing for a $4.1 million salary rather than the $3.625 million that the Diamondbacks had offered him. The arbitration committee ruled in favor of Bradley on February 21, making him the first largely non-closing reliever to make more than $4 million with fewer than 30 career saves. On July 18, after a delay in the MLB season due to the COVID-19 pandemic, Bradley was named the Diamondbacks' closer for the 2020 season. He made only 16 appearances for the club that season, going 2–0 with a 2.95 ERA.

=== Cincinnati Reds (2020) ===
On August 31, 2020, at the MLB trade deadline, the Diamondbacks traded Bradley to the Cincinnati Reds in exchange for utility player Josh VanMeter and outfielder Stuart Fairchild. He made his team debut on September 1, pitching 1 2/3 shutout innings in a 16–2 loss to the St. Louis Cardinals less than three hours after his plane arrived in Cincinnati. In the postseason, Bradley took the loss in the first game of the 2020 National League Wild Card Series, giving up two hits in the 13th inning against the Atlanta Braves. On December 2, Bradley non-tendered alongside catcher Curt Casali, outfielder Brian Goodwin, and pitcher R. J. Alaniz. He recorded a 1.17 ERA in 7 2/3 innings with the Reds.

=== Philadelphia Phillies (2021) ===
On January 18, 2021, the Philadelphia Phillies announced that they had signed Bradley to a one-year, $6 million contract in an attempt to bolster their bullpen. That same day, he tweeted "#SignJT", a reference to the ongoing calls to the Phillies administration to re-sign free agent catcher J. T. Realmuto. It was projected, during the Phillies' 2021 "bullpen battle", that Bradley might take over the closer role from veteran Héctor Neris. On March 31, however, manager Joe Girardi said that Neris would maintain the ninth-inning position, with Bradley and José Alvarado serving as setup men. Bradley was placed on the injured list on April 11 with an oblique strain, and was expected to miss three to four weeks. In his absence, Connor Brogdon was asked to take over Bradley's role, while JoJo Romero was called up to the majors. Bradley returned on May 18 for a game against the Miami Marlins, striking out the only batter he faced and taking the win. He became a free agent at the end of the season.

=== Los Angeles Angels (2022) ===
On March 18, 2022, Bradley signed a one-year, $3.75 million contract with the Los Angeles Angels. On June 26, Bradley broke his elbow while climbing over the dugout railing during a brawl in a game against the Seattle Mariners, sidelining him for at least one month. He was activated from the injured list on September 27. He became a free agent following the season.

=== Miami Marlins (2023) ===
On April 11, 2023, Bradley signed a minor league contract with the Miami Marlins. In 9 games (including 1 start) for the Triple–A Jacksonville Jumbo Shrimp, he registered a 2.95 ERA with 16 strikeouts in 18 1/3 innings of work. On June 13, Bradley was selected to the major league roster. In 4 games for Miami, he struggled to a 12.27 ERA with 7 strikeouts across 7 1/3 innings pitched. He was designated for assignment by the team on July 1. On July 3, he cleared waivers and was sent outright to Triple–A Jacksonville. On October 2, Bradley elected free agency.

== Appearances outside of baseball ==
As of 2024, Bradley hoped to return to professional baseball. In the interim, he made an appearance as a color commentator for a Diamondbacks spring training game, and he worked as the creative director of golf and community events at a golf course in Dobson Ranch, Mesa.

== Pitcher profile ==
Bradley is a power pitcher who was praised for a successful transition from the starting rotation to the bullpen, working in both the eighth and ninth inning since 2017. The primary concern around his pitching in his first two MLB seasons was a high walk rate, something that he managed to cut in half in 2017, during his first season as a reliever. Bradley told The Ringer in 2018 that the biggest change he made since becoming a reliever was "just being aggressive—I'm trying to get ahead of guys and not walk guys."

For the early part of his career, Bradley largely possessed a two-pitch repertoire consisting of a fastball and a curveball. He pitched a cutter in the minor leagues, and began reintegrating it into his repertoire in 2017 after an unexplained pause. The following year, Bradley also began experimenting with a slider and a changeup to aid him in the bullpen. During the 2020 season, Bradley primarily threw three pitches. His 94 mph (151 km/h) fastball made up 67 percent of his total pitches, while an 80 mph (130 km/h) curveball was thrown 22 percent of the time, and a 86 mph (138 km/h) changeup was thrown the other 11 percent.

== Personal life ==
After being reassigned to the bullpen in 2017, Bradley began to grow a distinct beard, leading to jokes about the necessity of facial hair on a reliever. That season, the Diamondbacks began selling T-shirts with Bradley's face and the phrase "Bring in the Beard". Bradley told reporters that, growing up, he preferred to remain clean-shaven because he did not like how bright his beard appeared, but that he let it grow out after November and through spring training. After noticing an improvement in his pitching, Bradley decided to keep the beard, saying, "I don't believe in special powers but it's kind of funny that as soon as I grew a beard I seemed to pitch better". He clarified that he believed most of the improvement was due to the shorter inning workload placed on a reliever, but that, "Just in case the palm reader was correct, I won't shave my beard until I retire".

Bradley took up waterfowl hunting early in his baseball career, and continues to hunt in his free time. In 2017, Bradley purchased a 500 acres (200 ha) ranch in Pawnee, Oklahoma, about 8 miles (13 km) away from the Spring Valley Rod and Gun Club. Bradley and his high school baseball teammate, Mak Monckton, connected with the gun club owner and started Crash Landing Outdoors, a hunting guide company. The name derives from Bradley's Labrador Retriever, Crash.
