= Robbie Ray =

American baseball player (born 1991)

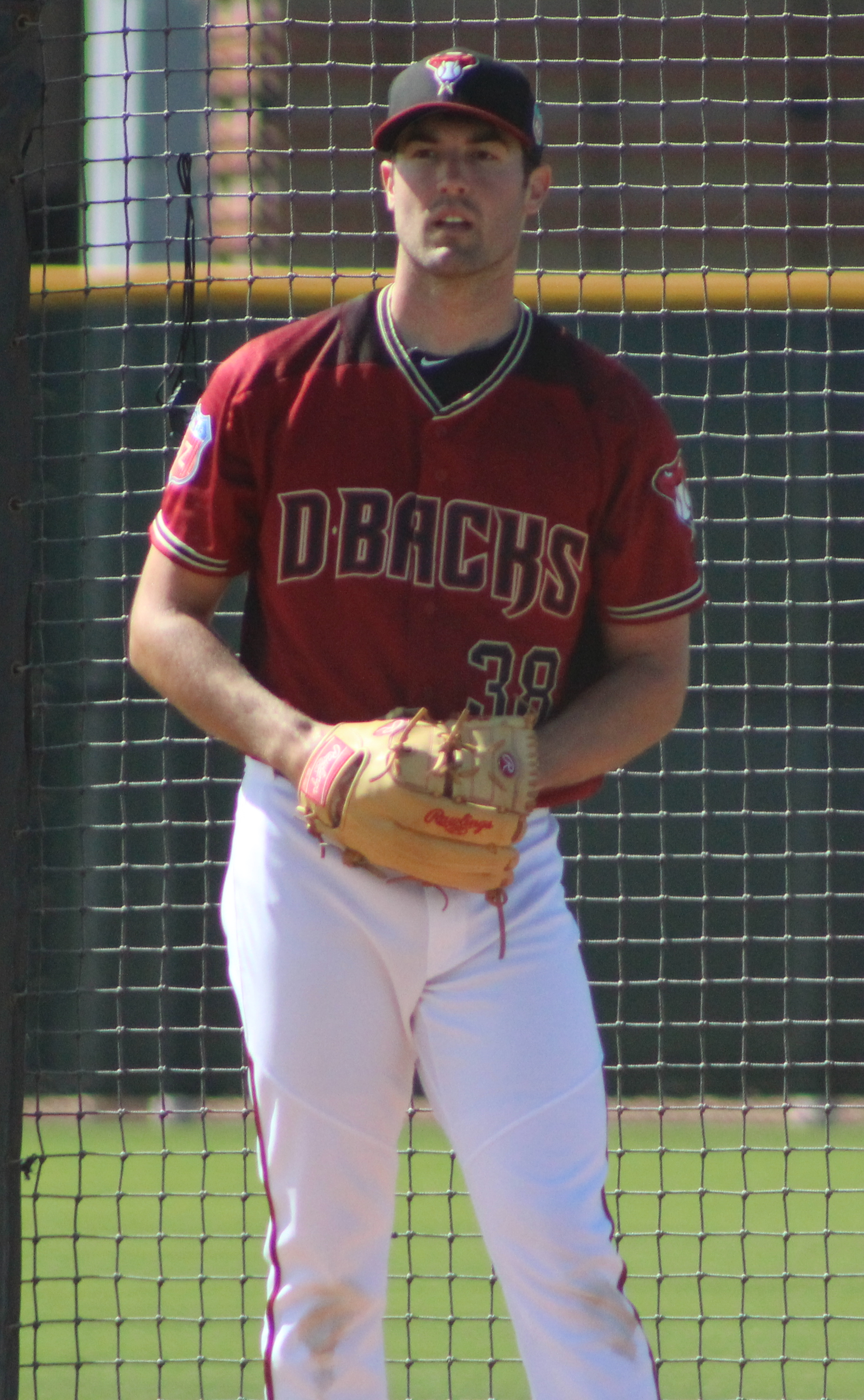
- Ray with the Arizona Diamondbacks in 2016

Free agent
- Pitcher
- Born: October 1, 1991 (age 35); Brentwood, Tennessee, U.S.
- Bats: Left Throws: Left

MLB debut
- May 6, 2014, for the Detroit Tigers

MLB statistics (through 2026 season)
- Win–loss record: 101–89
- Earned run average: 3.90
- Strikeouts: 1,874
- Stats at Baseball Reference

Teams
- Detroit Tigers (2014); Arizona Diamondbacks (2015–2020); Toronto Blue Jays (2020–2021); Seattle Mariners (2022–2023); San Francisco Giants (2024–2026); San Diego Padres (2026)

Career highlights and awards
- 2× All-Star (2017, 2025); AL Cy Young Award (2021); All-MLB First Team (2021); AL ERA leader (2021); MLB strikeout leader (2021)

Robert Glenn Ray (born October 1, 1991) is an American professional baseball pitcher who is a free agent. He has played in Major League Baseball (MLB) for the Detroit Tigers, Arizona Diamondbacks, Toronto Blue Jays, Seattle Mariners, San Francisco Giants, and San Diego Padres.

Ray is a two-time MLB All-Star, having been selected in 2017 and 2025. In 2021, he won the American League (AL) Cy Young Award with the Blue Jays after leading the AL in earned run average (ERA) and MLB in strikeouts. He was also named to the All-MLB First Team.

== Early life ==
Ray was born on October 1, 1991, in Brentwood, Tennessee. Growing up in the Nashville metropolitan area, he played youth baseball on travel teams alongside future MLB All-Star Mookie Betts. Although they were teammates on those travel teams, they competed against each other in high school; Ray attended Brentwood High School, while Betts attended John Overton High School. In his senior season, Ray posted a 7–1 win–loss record and a 0.50 earned run average (ERA). He struck out 95 batters and walked only 13. He pitched three no-hitters, including a perfect game against Centennial High School.

== Professional career ==
=== Draft and minor leagues ===
After de-committing from Vanderbilt University, Ray had planned to play college baseball for the Arkansas Razorbacks when he was selected by the Washington Nationals in the 12th round of the 2010 MLB draft. He signed with the team on August 14, just before the deadline for draftees, and accepted a signing bonus of $799,000, an amount typically allotted for fourth-round draft picks. Because he signed so late in the season, Ray had limited time to play in the minor leagues in 2010. He pitched only one inning that season, striking out two batters in an appearance for the Vermont Lake Monsters of the New York–Penn League. After spending five weeks at extended spring training Ray's first professional baseball start came on May 10, 2011, when he pitched five innings for the Class A Hagerstown Suns, striking out six and walking none. Although Hagerstown missed the South Atlantic League playoffs, Ray had a standout season, going 2–3 with a 3.13 ERA in 20 starts.

Promoted to the Potomac Nationals for the 2012 season, Ray struggled with the jump to Class A-Advanced. He went 4–12 with a 6.56 ERA, walking 49 and striking out 86 in 105 2/3 innings. Ray described the season as "put[ting] me in my place and show[ing] me what I needed to work on", and he spent the offseason adjusting his pitching mechanics with the help of minor league pitching coach Chris Michalak. By turning his hip mid-pitch and lifting his arm slot, Ray was able to isolate the strike zone, and increase his confidence as a pitcher. Leading the Carolina League (CAR) with 93 strikeouts and tying for fourth with an ERA of 2.84 in the first half, Ray was named to the CAR All-Star Team. After going 6–3 with a 3.11 ERA in 16 starts and striking out 100 batters in 84 innings, Ray was promoted to the Double-A Harrisburg Senators on July 5, 2013. He recorded a complete game shutout in only his second Double-A start, allowing just three singles and striking out 11 in a victory over the Erie SeaWolves. In 11 starts for Harrisburg, Ray went 5–2 with a 3.72 ERA, striking out 60 batters in 58 innings.

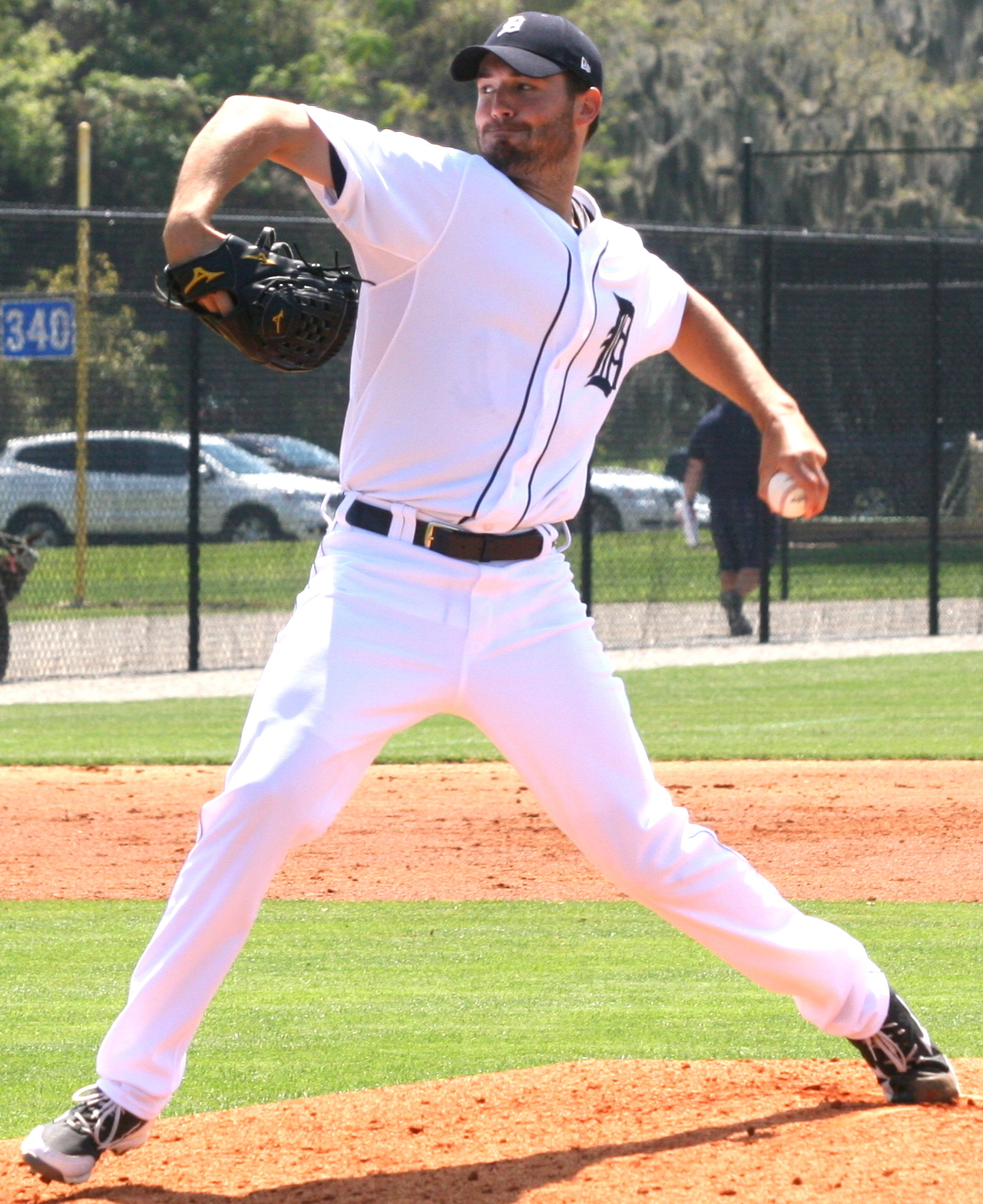
Ray with the Detroit Tigers in 2014 spring training

On December 3, 2013, the Nationals traded Ray, Ian Krol, and Steve Lombardozzi Jr. to the Detroit Tigers for Doug Fister, a move that was part of general manager Dave Dombrowski's larger plan to cut the Tigers' payroll and invest in pitching prospects. Ray received an invitation to join the Tigers for spring training, with the stipulation that he would only be considered for the major league starting rotation if Justin Verlander was not yet ready to return from core muscle surgery. Ray ultimately began the season with the Triple-A Toledo Mud Hens, serving as the No. 3 starter in a rotation that alternated between left- and right-handed pitchers.

=== Detroit Tigers (2014) ===
When Aníbal Sánchez was placed on the disabled list with a middle finger laceration, Ray, who had gone 3–2 with a 1.59 ERA in five starts for Toledo, was called up to fill his spot in the rotation. Ray made his MLB debut on May 6, 2014, allowing only one run on five hits in 5 1/3 innings of an 11–4 rout of the Houston Astros. He was the first Tigers pitcher to win his first major league start at the age of 22 or younger since Jeff Weaver in 1999.

After two spot starts for Detroit, Ray was sent back down to Toledo, where he remained until August 10, when he was once again called up to fill in for Sánchez. Ray struggled during this second call-up, which was extended after Sánchez's strained pectoral muscle turned out to be a more severe injury than anticipated. Ray pitched in nine games for the Tigers, starting six, during which he went 1–4 with an 8.16 ERA. He found more success in Toledo, posting a 7–6 record and 4.22 ERA in 20 games (19 starts). After the regular season ended, Ray showed signs of improvement in the Arizona Fall League, where he allowed only one run and struck out 12 in his first two starts for the Glendale Desert Dogs. In four starts for Glendale, Ray went 1–1 with a 2.45 ERA, striking out 13 batters in 11 innings of work.

=== Arizona Diamondbacks (2015–2020) ===
The Tigers traded Ray to the Arizona Diamondbacks on December 5, 2014, as part of a three-team trade also involving the New York Yankees: Ray and Domingo Leyba went from Detroit to Arizona, Didi Gregorius went from Arizona to New York, and Shane Greene went from New York to Detroit. Once there, he was assigned to the Triple-A Reno Aces to open the 2015 season. When Archie Bradley was hit in the face with a line drive, Ray was called up for a spot start in the second game of a doubleheader against the Colorado Rockies on May 6. He allowed one run on five hits in six innings and took Arizona to a 5–1 victory. When Bradley suffered another injury on June 4, Ray was once again recalled to take his place in the rotation. With a 5–12 record and 3.52 ERA, Arizona Chief Baseball Officer Tony La Russa was confident in Ray's development over the course of the 2015 season, with his increased command leading to 108 strikeouts in 117 1/3 innings.

Ray was named to a major league opening day roster for the first time in 2016, serving as the Diamondbacks' No. 5 starter. He started the season in a slump, going over a month between his first and second wins of the season, with the second coming in a 12–2 rout of the Yankees on May 16. He hit his first career home run on June 7, a solo shot against Chris Archer of the Tampa Bay Rays. In 32 starts for the Diamondbacks, Ray was 8–15 with a 4.90 ERA in 2016. His season was marked by inconsistency: Ray had 11.3 strikeouts per nine innings (K/9), becoming only the 11th pitcher in MLB history to do so, and he recorded 218 strikeouts in 174 1/3 innings, but his ERA was also the third-worst of any pitcher with 200 or more strikeouts in a single season. In terms of Wins Above Replacement (WAR), he was at 0.7 by Baseball-Reference.com, 3.0 by FanGraphs, and 4.8 by Baseball Prospectus.

Ray had an unremarkable start to the 2017 season, with a 4.57 ERA through eight starts. At that point, Randy Johnson, who was serving as a special assistant to the Diamondbacks' president, spoke with Ray and told him, "You better figure this out, because you never know what your last pitch is going to be." From there, Ray went on a 27 1/3-inning scoreless streak, including his first major league complete game shutout, coming on May 30 against the Pittsburgh Pirates. As the Diamondbacks' No. 2 starter behind Zack Greinke, Ray finished the first half of the season with eight wins and a 2.97 ERA, leading to his first All-Star Game selection. Ray's season was interrupted on July 28, when he was hit in the head with a 108 mph (174 km/h) line drive from Luke Voit of the St. Louis Cardinals. Ray fell to the ground and was placed on concussion protocols, only returning to the mound on August 24. Ray made 28 regular-season starts for Arizona, going 15–5 with a 2.89 ERA in the process. The Diamondbacks propelled to 93 wins, while Ray boasted 12.1 K/9 and held his opponents to a batting average of .199, the best of any Diamondback since Johnson's .197 in 2004. Ray made his first postseason appearance with 2 1/3 innings of relief in the 2017 National League Wild Card Game against the Colorado Rockies. Although the Diamondbacks won that game and advanced to the 2017 National League Division Series (NLDS), the need to use Ray in the Wild Card Game pushed his start from Game 1 to Game 2 of the NLDS. There, he surrendered three runs in 4 1/3 innings of an eventual 8–5 defeat at the hands of the Los Angeles Dodgers. The Dodgers swept the Diamondbacks in three games, eliminating Arizona from the postseason.

After going 2–0 with a 4.88 ERA in his first four starts of the 2018 season, Ray left his April 30 start against the Nationals with a strained oblique muscle and no timetable for his return. He returned on June 27, pitching six innings and allowing two hits in a 2–1 victory over the Miami Marlins. Upon his return, Ray struggled with going deep into games: on his third time through the order, batters would hit .286 against him; the season prior, it would take four times through the lineup before his opposing players batting averages would be that high, He finished the season 6–2 with an ERA of 3.93 in 24 starts. In 123 2/3 innings, he struck out 165 batters, and gave up 70 walks.

Ray pitched a career high 33 starts in 2019 despite averaging less than 6 innings per start. He was 12–8 with a 4.34 ERA in 174 1/3 innings, tying his career best innings pitched from 2016. He also struck out a career-high 235 batters.

On August 16, 2020, Ray reached 1,000 MLB career strikeouts. In 2020 with Arizona he was 1–4 with a 7.84 ERA. He led the NL in walks given up (31).

=== Toronto Blue Jays (2020–2021) ===
On August 31, 2020, the Diamondbacks traded Ray along with cash considerations to the Toronto Blue Jays in exchange for Travis Bergen. On September 1, 2020, he made his Blue Jays debut. With the 2020 Toronto Blue Jays, Ray appeared in 5 games, compiling a 1–1 record with 4.79 ERA and 25 strikeouts in 20.2 innings pitched. He re-signed with the Blue Jays for the 2021 season, signing a 1-year, $8 million contract. On July 11, 2021, Ray took a no-hitter into the 7th inning against the Tampa Bay Rays when a one-out double by Yandy Díaz broke it up.

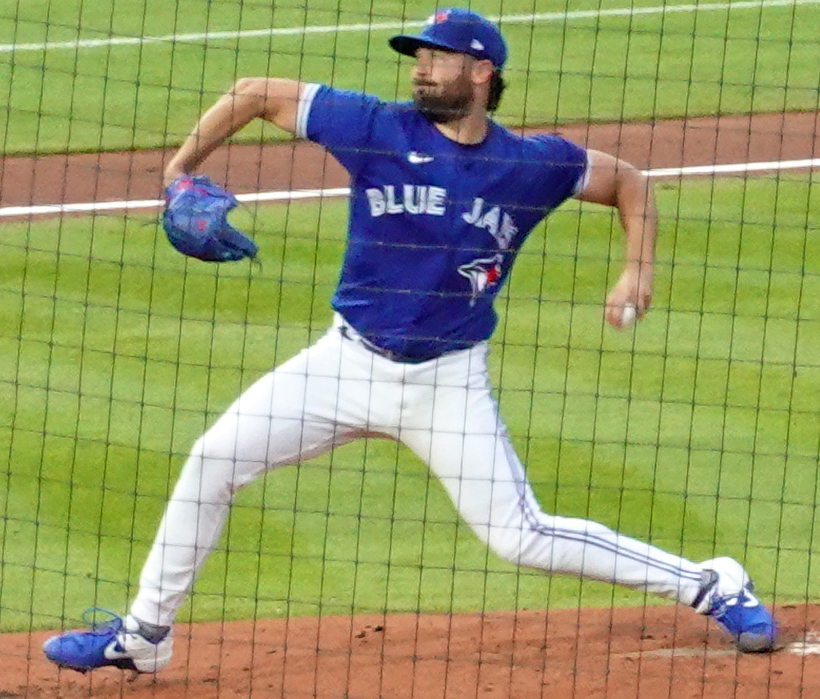
Ray pitching for the Toronto Blue Jays in 2021

On August 30, he struck out 10 Orioles and reached 1,000 career innings pitched. His 1,244 strikeouts are the most in Major League history through a player's first 1,000 career innings pitched.

Ray finished the 2021 season with a 13–7 record and led the American League in ERA (2.84), strikeouts (248), innings pitched (193 1/3), and WHIP (1.04). He left 90.1% of runners on base, tops in the majors. Ray won the American League Cy Young Award in a near-unanimous vote, receiving 29 of 30 first-place votes. He also won the Players Choice Award for AL Outstanding Pitcher.

=== Seattle Mariners (2022–2023) ===
On November 30, 2021, the Seattle Mariners signed Ray to a five-year contract worth $115 million, with an opt-out after three years and a no-trade clause. In May 2022, Ray was not allowed to travel with the team to play in Toronto because he was not vaccinated against COVID-19. In the 2022 regular season, he was 12–12 with a 3.71 ERA in 187 innings, and led the majors in pickoffs at first base, with six. Only after the Canadian vaccine mandates were dropped in September was Ray allowed to pitch in Toronto during the postseason. On October 11, 2022, in the first game of the ALDS against the Houston Astros, Ray gave up a walk-off three-run home run to Yordan Alvarez, with two outs in the bottom of the 9th inning.

Ray made only one start in 2023, allowing three runs in 3 1/3 innings in a loss to the Cleveland Guardians on March 31. On April 26, it was announced Ray would undergo surgery to repair a torn flexor tendon, ending his 2023 season. On May 3, Ray underwent the procedure, which was revealed to be Tommy John surgery.

=== San Francisco Giants (2024–2026) ===
On January 5, 2024, Ray was traded to the San Francisco Giants in exchange for Mitch Haniger, Anthony DeSclafani, and cash considerations. He was activated from the injured list to make his return from Tommy John surgery on July 24. Ray went on to start 7 games in 2024 and finished the season with a 3–2 record, a 4.70 ERA, and 43 strikeouts. On November 2, 2024, Ray declined to exercise his opt-out clause, allowing him to remain with the team.

In 2025, Ray earned his second career All-Star Game selection. At the time of his selection, he had a 9–3 record with a 2.68 ERA over 107 1/3 innings pitched. In total, he pitched 182 1/3 innings in 2025 over 32 starts, posting a record of 11–8 and an ERA of 3.65 while striking out 186.

=== San Diego Padres (2026) ===
On August 3, 2026, the Giants traded Ray to the San Diego Padres in exchange for Miguel Méndez and Joniel Hernandez.

In 2026, Ray made 31 appearances (30 starts) with a 13–8 record, a 3.59 ERA, and issued an MLB-leading 84 walks.

== Player profile ==
Ray throws a fastball in the 92–95 miles per hour (148–153 km/h) range, topping out at 98 miles per hour (158 km/h). His primary off-speed pitches are a slider that averages about 85 miles per hour (137 km/h) and tops out at 87 miles per hour (140 km/h), and a curveball that he throws at about 84 miles per hour (135 km/h).

== Personal life ==
Ray married Taylor Pasma in November 2014. They have two sons and two daughters.

== See also ==
- List of baseball players who underwent Tommy John surgery

Awards and achievements
Preceded by Jameson Taillon	American League Pitcher of the Month; August 2021	Succeeded by Frankie Montas
Preceded by Yoshinobu Yamamoto	National League Pitcher of the Month; May 2025	Succeeded by None
