= Ossian, Indiana =

- Town
- Town of Ossian
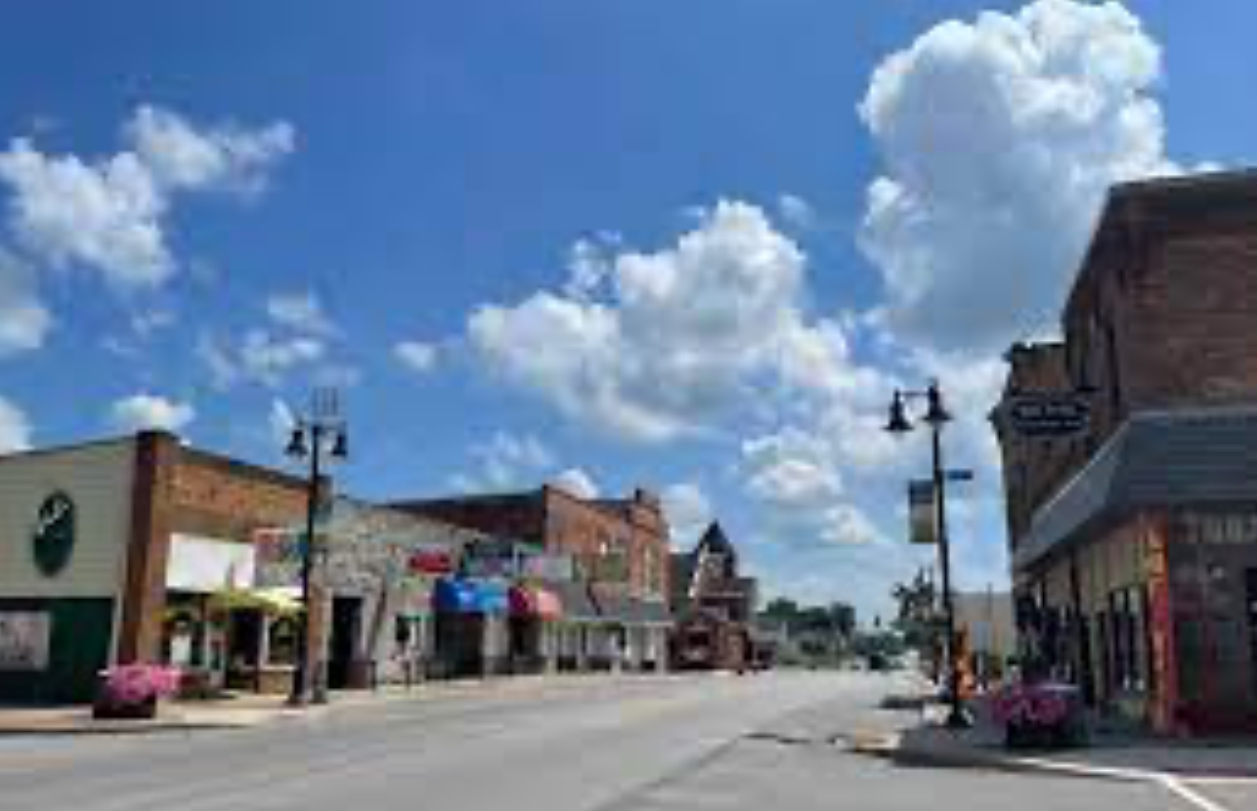
- Downtown Ossian

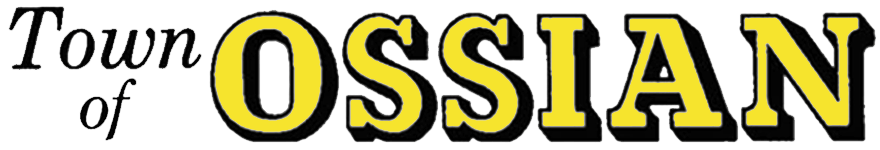
- Seal Logo
- Motto: "Handed Down From Generation To Generation"
- Location of Ossian in Wells County, Indiana.
- Coordinates: 40°52′25″N 85°10′06″W
- Country: United States
- State: Indiana
- County: Wells
- Township: Jefferson

Area
  - Total: 1.68 sq mi (4.34 km^{2})
  - Land: 1.66 sq mi (4.31 km^{2})
  - Water: 0.012 sq mi (0.03 km^{2})
- Elevation: 827 ft (252 m)

Population (2020)
  - Total: 3,266
  - Density: 1,960.8/sq mi (757.05/km^{2})
- Time zone: UTC-5 (Eastern (EST))
  - Summer (DST): UTC-4 (EDT)
- ZIP code: 46777
- Area code: 260
- FIPS code: 18-57168
- GNIS feature ID: 2396840
- Website: www.ossianin.com

Ossian is a town in Jefferson Township, Wells County, in the U.S. state of Indiana. The town was named after Ossian, the narrator of a cycle of epic poems by the Scottish poet James Macpherson. The population was 3,266 at the 2020 census.

== History ==
The Ossian post office has been in operation since 1850. In 1843, Indiana State Road 1 was made serviceable from Fort Wayne to Bluffton. On January 25, 1850, the Fort Wayne and Bluffton Plank Road Company was then organized. The plank road was a toll road; any horse or horse-drawn vehicle had to pay a toll. The Fort Wayne, Cincinnati, & Louisville Railroad was built through Ossian in 1869, though it was not in complete operation until the following year. Today, the railroad is a significant north–south route for the Norfolk Southern Corporation. Ossian is still served by Indiana State Road 1, while four miles north is Interstate 469, the beltway around Fort Wayne, and also just seven miles south of Fort Wayne International Airport.

A 25-foot tall grain silo was painted to look like a minion from the Despicable Me movie on a nearby rural farm in 2016. A Vietnam War veteran mentioned the idea to his family and when he died at 73, family and friends painted it as a way to honor his memory. The grain silo soon became popular with people stopping by to view it from the road and was picked up by national news.

== Geography ==
According to the 2010 census, Ossian has a total area of 1.44 square miles (3.73 km^{2}), of which 1.43 square miles (3.70 km^{2}) (or 99.31%) is land and 0.01 square miles (0.03 km^{2}) (or 0.69%) is water.

== Demographics ==
Historical population
Census	Pop.	Note	%±
1880	522		—
1900	529		—
1910	661		25.0%
1920	724		9.5%
1930	788		8.8%
1940	784		−0.5%
1950	761		−2.9%
1960	1,108		45.6%
1970	1,538		38.8%
1980	1,945		26.5%
1990	2,428		24.8%
2000	2,943		21.2%
2010	3,289		11.8%
2020	3,266		−0.7%
U.S. Decennial Census

=== 2020 census ===
As of the 2020 census, Ossian had a population of 3,266. The median age was 39.8 years. 23.3% of residents were under the age of 18 and 19.7% of residents were 65 years of age or older. For every 100 females there were 93.1 males, and for every 100 females age 18 and over there were 88.8 males age 18 and over.

0.0% of residents lived in urban areas, while 100.0% lived in rural areas.

There were 1,345 households in Ossian, of which 30.8% had children under the age of 18 living in them. Of all households, 51.7% were married-couple households, 15.7% were households with a male householder and no spouse or partner present, and 27.4% were households with a female householder and no spouse or partner present. About 30.2% of all households were made up of individuals and 15.9% had someone living alone who was 65 years of age or older.

There were 1,417 housing units, of which 5.1% were vacant. The homeowner vacancy rate was 1.1% and the rental vacancy rate was 9.6%.

Racial composition as of the 2020 census
Race	Number	Percent
White	2,988	91.5%
Black or African American	22	0.7%
American Indian and Alaska Native	9	0.3%
Asian	21	0.6%
Native Hawaiian and Other Pacific Islander	0	0.0%
Some other race	46	1.4%
Two or more races	180	5.5%
Hispanic or Latino (of any race)	181	5.5%

=== 2010 census ===
As of the census of 2010, there were 3,289 people, 1,287 households, and 909 families living in the town. The population density was 2,300.0 inhabitants per square mile (888.0/km^{2}). There were 1,385 housing units at an average density of 968.5 units per square mile (373.9 units/km^{2}). The racial makeup of the town was 97.4% White, 0.2% African American, 0.1% Native American, 0.5% Asian, 0.8% from other races, and 1.1% from two or more races. Hispanic or Latino of any race were 1.4% of the population.

There were 1,287 households, of which 37.2% had children under the age of 18 living with them, 54.1% were married couples living together, 11.7% had a female householder with no husband present, 4.9% had a male householder with no wife present, and 29.4% were non-families. 25.3% of all households were made up of individuals, and 10.7% had someone living alone who was 65 years of age or older. The average household size was 2.49 and the average family size was 2.98.

The median age in the town was 37.4 years. 26% of residents were under the age of 18; 7.8% were between the ages of 18 and 24; 25.7% were from 25 to 44; 25.2% were from 45 to 64; and 15.2% were 65 years of age or older. The gender makeup of the town was 47.6% male and 52.4% female.

=== 2000 census ===
As of the census of 2000, there were 2,943 people, 1,130 households, and 807 families living in the town. The population density was 1,972.0 inhabitants per square mile (761.4/km^{2}). There were 1,168 housing units at an average density of 782.6 units per square mile (302.2 units/km^{2}). The racial makeup of the town was 98.44% White, 0.14% African American, 0.10% Native American, 0.14% Asian, 0.44% from other races, and 0.75% from two or more races. Hispanic or Latino of any race were 1.16% of the population.

There were 1,130 households, out of which 38.3% had children under the age of 18 living with them, 57.9% were married couples living together, 10.4% had a female householder with no husband present, and 28.5% were non-families. 25.0% of all households were made up of individuals, and 11.1% had someone living alone who was 65 years of age or older. The average household size was 2.54 and the average family size was 3.04.

In the town, the population was spread out, with 28.4% under the age of 18, 7.9% from 18 to 24, 29.8% from 25 to 44, 18.9% from 45 to 64, and 14.9% who were 65 years of age or older. The median age was 35 years. For every 100 females, there were 91.7 males. For every 100 females age 18 and over, there were 84.4 males.

The median income for a household in the town was $45,449, and the median income for a family was $54,188. Males had a median income of $36,875 versus $25,682 for females. The per capita income for the town was $18,925. About 3.0% of families and 4.4% of the population were below the poverty line, including 4.2% of those under age 18 and 11.0% of those age 65 or over.

== Education ==
Northern Wells Community Schools serves northern Wells County, including the town of Ossian. The district operates four schools; Ossian Elementary, Lancaster Elementary, Norwell Middle School, and Norwell High School.

Ossian has a public library, a branch of the Wells County Public Library.
