= 2022 World Series =

118th edition of Major League Baseball's championship series

Team (Wins)	Managers	Season
Houston Astros (4)	Dusty Baker	106–56 (.654), GA: 16
Philadelphia Phillies (2)	Rob Thomson	87–75 (.537), GB: 14
- Dates: October 28 – November 5
- Venue(s): Minute Maid Park (Houston); Citizens Bank Park (Philadelphia)
- MVP: Jeremy Peña (Houston)
- Umpires: Jordan Baker, Lance Barksdale, Tripp Gibson, Pat Hoberg, James Hoye, Dan Iassogna (crew chief), Alan Porter

Broadcast
- Television: Fox (United States – English); Fox Deportes (United States – Spanish); MLB International (International)
- TV announcers: Joe Davis, John Smoltz, Ken Rosenthal, and Tom Verducci (Fox); Adrián García Márquez, Edgar González, Carlos Álvarez, and Jaime Motta (Fox Deportes); Dave Flemming and Dan Plesac (MLB International – English)
- Radio: ESPN (United States – English); TUDN (United States – Spanish); WIP, WPHT, KYW (PHI – English); WTTM (PHI – Spanish); KBME (HOU – English); KLAT (HOU – Spanish)
- Radio announcers: Dan Shulman, Jessica Mendoza, Eduardo Pérez and Buster Olney (ESPN); Jesús Acosta, Enrique Burak, Alberto Ferreiro, José Luis Nápoles, Luis Eduardo Quiñones, and Antonio de Valdés (TUDN); Scott Franzke, Tom McCarthy, and Larry Andersen (WIP); Oscar Budejen and Bill Kulik (WTTM); Robert Ford and Steve Sparks (KBME); Francisco Romero and Alex Treviño (KLAT)
- ALCS: Houston Astros over New York Yankees (4–0)
- NLCS: Philadelphia Phillies over San Diego Padres (4–1)

The 2022 World Series was the championship series of Major League Baseball's (MLB) 2022 season. The 118th edition of the World Series, it was a best-of-seven playoff between the National League (NL) champion Philadelphia Phillies and the American League (AL) champion Houston Astros. The Astros defeated the Phillies in six games to earn their second World Series championship. The series was broadcast in the United States on Fox television and ESPN Radio.

The Astros entered the 2022 MLB postseason as the AL West champions and the top-seeded AL team, while the Phillies won a wild card, earning the sixth and final NL playoff berth. The Phillies took a 2–1 lead after three games before the Astros won the final three games to win the series. Jeremy Peña won the World Series Most Valuable Player Award, the first position player to win the award as a rookie.

The series was notable for having the first World Series no-hitter since Don Larsen's perfect game in the 1956 World Series, when Astros pitchers Cristian Javier, Bryan Abreu, Rafael Montero, and Ryan Pressly combined to leave the Phillies hitless in Game 4. It was also the third postseason no-hitter in MLB history, after Roy Halladay's no-hitter (also at Citizens Bank Park) in Game 1 of the 2010 National League Division Series.

MLB has sold sponsorships to various postseason series since 2017, with YouTube TV serving as the official presenting sponsor of the World Series from 2017 through 2019. The World Series did not have a presenting sponsor in 2020 or 2021, but resumed sponsorship in 2022. As a result of a new multi-year agreement with Capital One, this World Series was officially known as the 2022 World Series presented by Capital One. To date, the 2022 Series is the last time a team clinched the series on their home field, after the Astros won Game 6 in Houston. In addition, it was the first time this had happened since 2013, when the Boston Red Sox clinched the series over the St. Louis Cardinals at Fenway Park.

== Background ==
This was the second postseason meeting between the Houston Astros and the Philadelphia Phillies following their 1980 National League Championship Series (Note: The Houston Astros were members of the National League until the 2013 season.) encounter, which was won by Philadelphia, 3–2, en route to winning the 1980 World Series.

Houston and Philadelphia met in the last series of the 2022 MLB season in Houston. Houston won two of the three games, although Philadelphia clinched their postseason berth in the first game with a win. The 19-game gap between the Astros and Phillies is the second largest in World Series history, trailing only the 23-game gap in 1906 between the 93-win Chicago White Sox and the 116-win Chicago Cubs.

=== Philadelphia Phillies ===
This was the eighth World Series appearance for the Phillies and the first since 2009. The Phillies struggled at the start of the 2022 season. On June 3, with a record of 22–29 (.431), manager Joe Girardi was fired, and Rob Thomson, their bench coach, was named their interim manager. From there, the Phillies went 65–46 (.586). They clinched a postseason berth on the third to last day of the season; they were the last postseason team of the 12 to clinch a berth. They qualified for the postseason as the sixth seed wild card entrant with an 87–75 (.537) record.

In the National League Wild Card Series, they swept the National League Central division winner St. Louis Cardinals, who were ranked third in the National League. In the National League Division Series, they defeated the defending World Series champion and National League East division winner Atlanta Braves in four games, the NL's second seed. In the National League Championship Series (NLCS), they defeated the fifth-seeded San Diego Padres in five games to clinch a World Series berth for the first time since 2009, which the Phillies lost in six games to the New York Yankees. Bryce Harper won the most valuable player award for the NLCS after batting 8-for-20 (.400) with two home runs and three doubles. The Phillies were the first team to finish third in their division and advance to a World Series since the 1981 New York Yankees.

Dave Dombrowski, the Phillies' president of baseball operations, made his fifth World Series appearance. Dombrowski was the first lead executive to make World Series appearances with four different teams, having done so with the Florida Marlins in 1997, Detroit Tigers in 2006 and 2012, and the Boston Red Sox in 2018.

=== Houston Astros ===
This is the fifth World Series appearance for the Astros, and the fourth as the American League team. The Astros qualified for the 2022 postseason as the American League (AL) West division winner. It was their fifth AL West championship in six years and their second straight championship. The Astros entered the postseason as the top seed in the American League. In the Division Series, they swept the fifth-seeded Seattle Mariners. In the American League Championship Series, they swept the second-seeded New York Yankees to make it to the World Series for the fourth time in the previous six seasons (2017, 2019, 2021) and the second consecutive season. They were the first American League team to return to the World Series in back-to-back years since the Kansas City Royals did in 2014 and 2015.

Houston's pitching staff led the American League in 2022 with the fewest runs allowed, lowest opponent's batting average and walks plus hits per inning pitched, the most strikeouts, and posted an MLB-best 2.78 bullpen earned run average (ERA). Justin Verlander, who had missed Houston's postseason runs in 2020 and 2021, made his return from Tommy John surgery and led the AL in wins, ERA, and walks plus hits per inning pitched ratio. Rookie shortstop Jeremy Peña won the League Championship Series Most Valuable Player Award after batting 6-for-18 (.333) with two home runs and two doubles in the ALCS.

Dusty Baker, in his 25th season as a major league manager, was seeking his first World Series win as a manager (he won the 1981 World Series as a player with the Dodgers). At 73 years of age, Baker was the oldest manager in World Series history.

== Summary ==
Houston won the series, 4–2.

Game	Date	Score	Location	Time	Attendance
1	October 28	Philadelphia Phillies – 6, Houston Astros – 5 (10)	Minute Maid Park	4:34	42,903
2	October 29	Philadelphia Phillies – 2, Houston Astros – 5	Minute Maid Park	3:18	42,926
3	November 1†	Houston Astros – 0, Philadelphia Phillies – 7	Citizens Bank Park	3:08	45,712
4	November 2	Houston Astros – 5, Philadelphia Phillies – 0	Citizens Bank Park	3:25	45,693
5	November 3	Houston Astros – 3, Philadelphia Phillies – 2	Citizens Bank Park	3:57	45,693
6	November 5	Philadelphia Phillies – 1, Houston Astros – 4	Minute Maid Park	3:13	42,958

† Game 3 was postponed from October 31, due to rain; consequently, all subsequent games were postponed by one day from the original schedule.

== Matchups ==
=== Game 1 ===
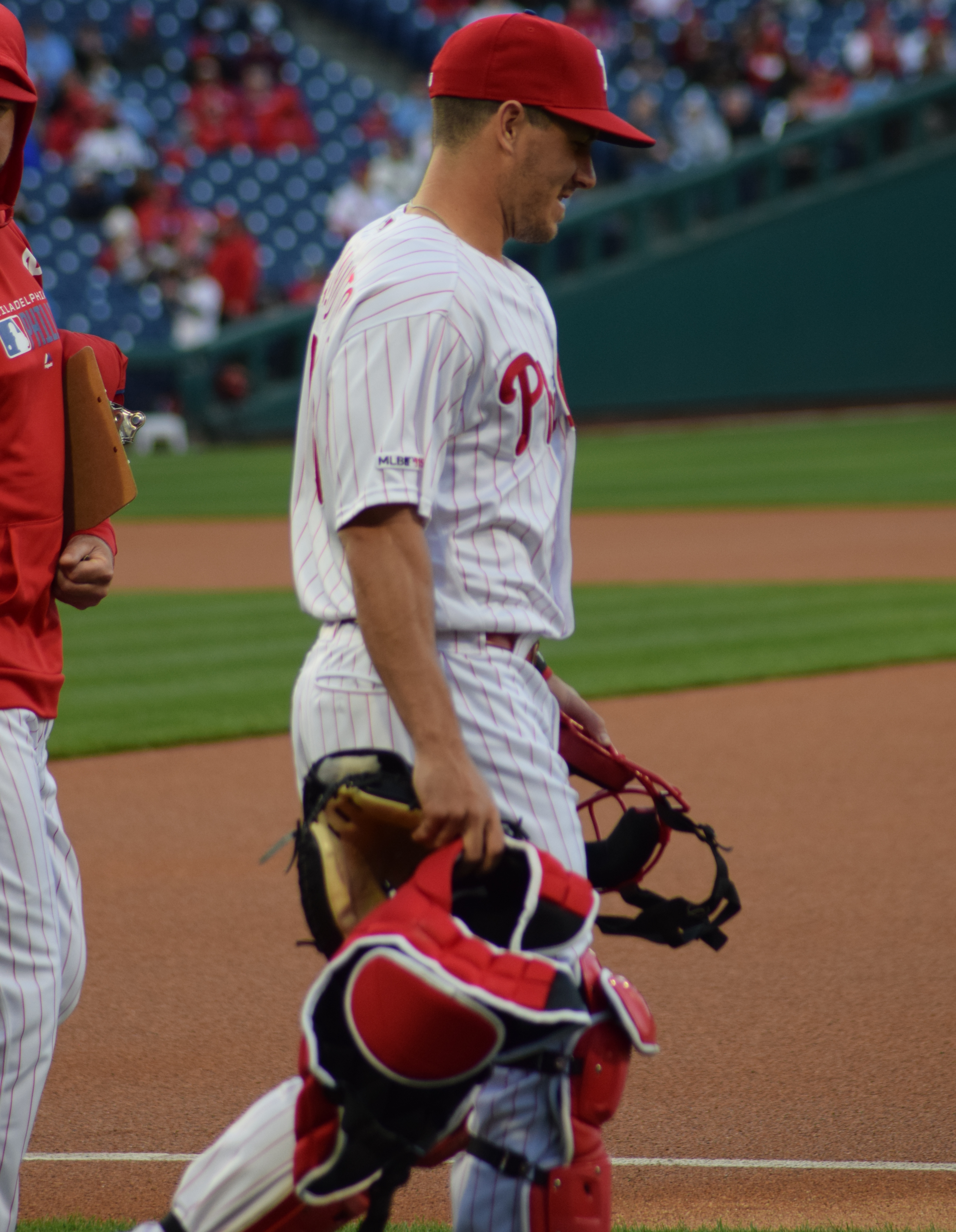
J. T. Realmuto hit the game-winning home run of Game 1 in the 10th inning for the Phillies.

October 28, 2022 7:03 pm (CDT) at Minute Maid Park in Houston, Texas 73 °F (23 °C), roof closed
Team	1	2	3	4	5	6	7	8	9	10	R	H	E
Philadelphia	0	0	0	3	2	0	0	0	0	1	6	9	0
Houston	0	2	3	0	0	0	0	0	0	0	5	10	0
WP: Seranthony Domínguez (1–0) LP: Luis García (0–1) Sv: David Robertson (1); Home runs: PHI: J. T. Realmuto (1); HOU: Kyle Tucker 2 (2); Attendance: 42,903; Boxscore

This was the first World Series since 1915 to start on a Friday, a change made in part to avoid playing on Sunday and thus going head-to-head with the NFL and NBC Sunday Night Football. Prior to Game 1, Eric Burton of the band Black Pumas sang "The Star-Spangled Banner". Terry Puhl threw the ceremonial first pitch and Simone Biles called "play ball!". Justin Verlander started for the Astros while Aaron Nola started for the Phillies.

Kyle Tucker hit a solo home run off of Nola in the bottom of the second inning. Nola then gave up two singles to Yuli Gurriel and Chas McCormick. With runners at the corners, Martín Maldonado hit a run batted in single scoring Gurriel. Jose Altuve grounded into a double play to end the inning. Jeremy Peña doubled to start the third for Houston and Alex Bregman drew a walk. Tucker hit a three-run home run into the Astros' bullpen to give Houston a 5–0 lead. Verlander took a no-hit bid into the top of the fourth inning when he gave up a single to Rhys Hoskins. Bryce Harper singled, moving Hoskins to third. Nick Castellanos drove in Hoskins with a single, and Alec Bohm drove in Harper and Castellanos with a double down the left-field line to trim the lead to two. In the top of the fifth inning, Verlander gave up a leadoff double to Brandon Marsh, and walked Kyle Schwarber. J. T. Realmuto hit a double off the base of the wall to score both runners and tie the game at five. Realmuto advanced to third on a Harper groundout, but Verlander struck out Castellanos, ending the inning. At the top of the sixth, Nola was replaced by José Alvarado, who retired the side.

The game remained tied through nine innings, and entered extra innings, becoming the first World Series game to be decided in extra innings since Game 3 of 2018. In the top of the tenth inning, Realmuto hit a solo home run off Luis García to give the Phillies a one-run lead. After a Harper single and a Bryson Stott walk, García was taken out of the game and replaced with Ryne Stanek, who was able to get out of the inning. In the bottom of the tenth inning, David Robertson struck out Yordan Alvarez before giving up a double to Bregman. Tucker then swung and missed a curveball in the dirt and was thrown out at first. Robertson walked Gurriel, bringing pinch hitter Aledmys Díaz to the plate. Robertson threw a wild pitch to advance the runners to second and third. After working the count to 2–0, Díaz was hit on the elbow by Robertson and started toward first base. However, the home plate umpire ruled that Díaz had leaned into the pitch, resulting in ball three. Two pitches later, Díaz grounded out, ending the game. It was the first time since 2002 that a team had overcome a five-run deficit to win a World Series game, when the San Francisco Giants – also managed by Dusty Baker – blew such a lead in Game 6.

=== Game 2 ===
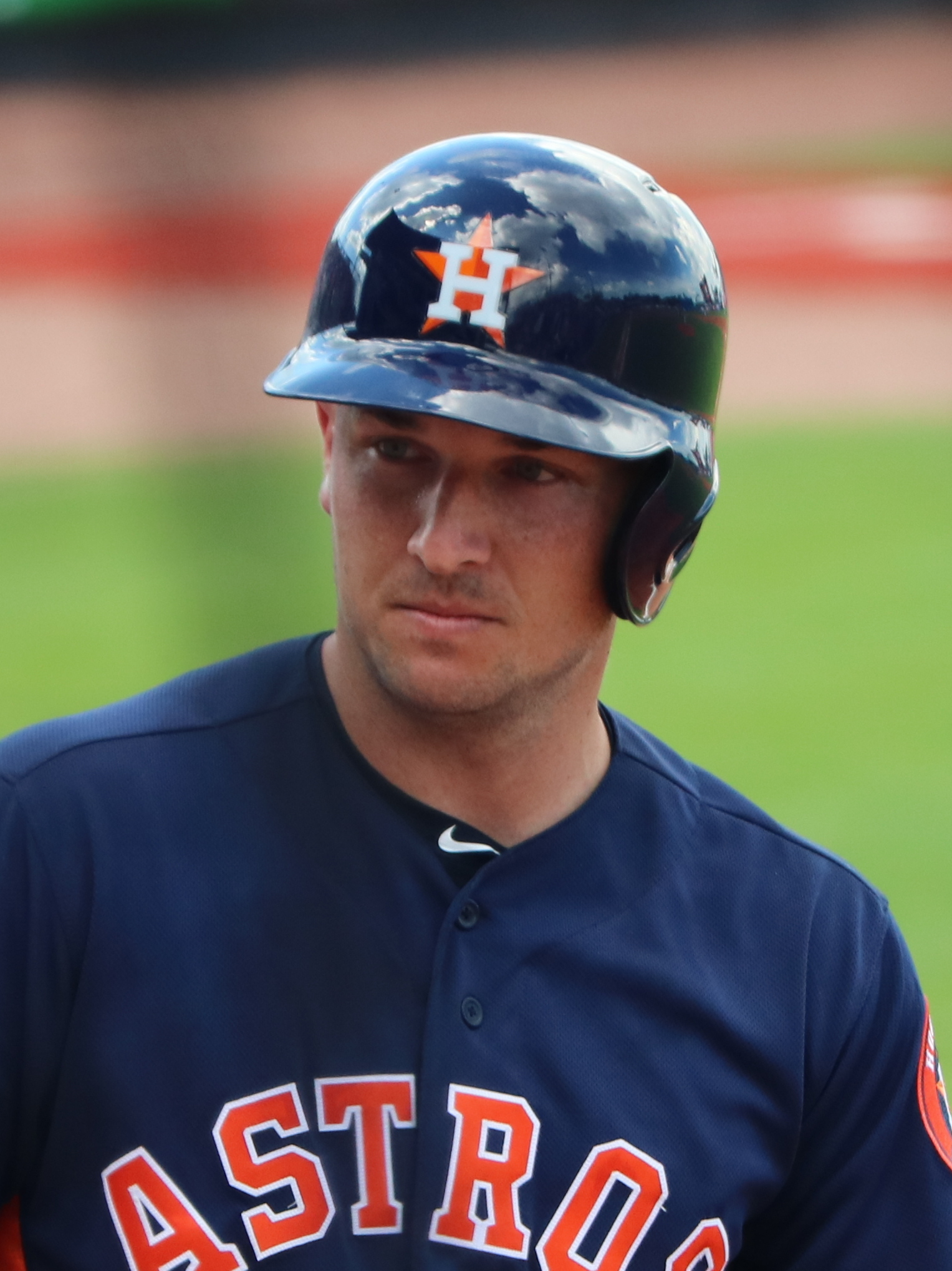
Alex Bregman hit a home run in the fifth inning of Game 2.

October 29, 2022 7:03 pm (CDT) at Minute Maid Park in Houston, Texas 73 °F (23 °C), roof closed
Team	1	2	3	4	5	6	7	8	9	R	H	E
Philadelphia	0	0	0	0	0	0	1	0	1	2	6	1
Houston	3	0	0	0	2	0	0	0	X	5	7	2
WP: Framber Valdez (1–0) LP: Zack Wheeler (0–1); Home runs: PHI: None; HOU: Alex Bregman (1); Attendance: 42,926; Boxscore

Little Big Town performed the national anthem before Game 2. Craig Biggio threw the ceremonial first pitch to Jeff Bagwell, and Bun B called "play ball!". Framber Valdez started for Houston and Zack Wheeler started for Philadelphia.

In the first inning, Jeremy Peña hit an RBI double to score Jose Altuve for the first run. Yordan Alvarez followed with the third straight double to bring in the second run for the Astros. With that hit, Houston became the first World Series team to start a game with three straight extra-base hits. Alvarez scored the third run on an error. In the bottom of the fifth inning, Alex Bregman hit a two-run home run to left field to make the score 5–0. Nick Castellanos scored the first run for the Phillies on a sacrifice fly by Jean Segura in the seventh inning to make it 5–1. In the top of the eighth inning, Kyle Schwarber hit a foul ball that was initially ruled a two-run home run, which would have made the score 5–3. Schwarber ended up flying out deep to right on the next pitch, again just missing a home run. In the top of the ninth inning, Alec Bohm scored on an error by first baseman Yuli Gurriel to make it 5–2, which proved to be the final score.

Game 2 was also notable for umpire Pat Hoberg calling a "perfect game" with 129 of 129 pitches called correctly. Hoberg received widespread praise from both fans and the press for this accomplishment.

=== Game 3 ===
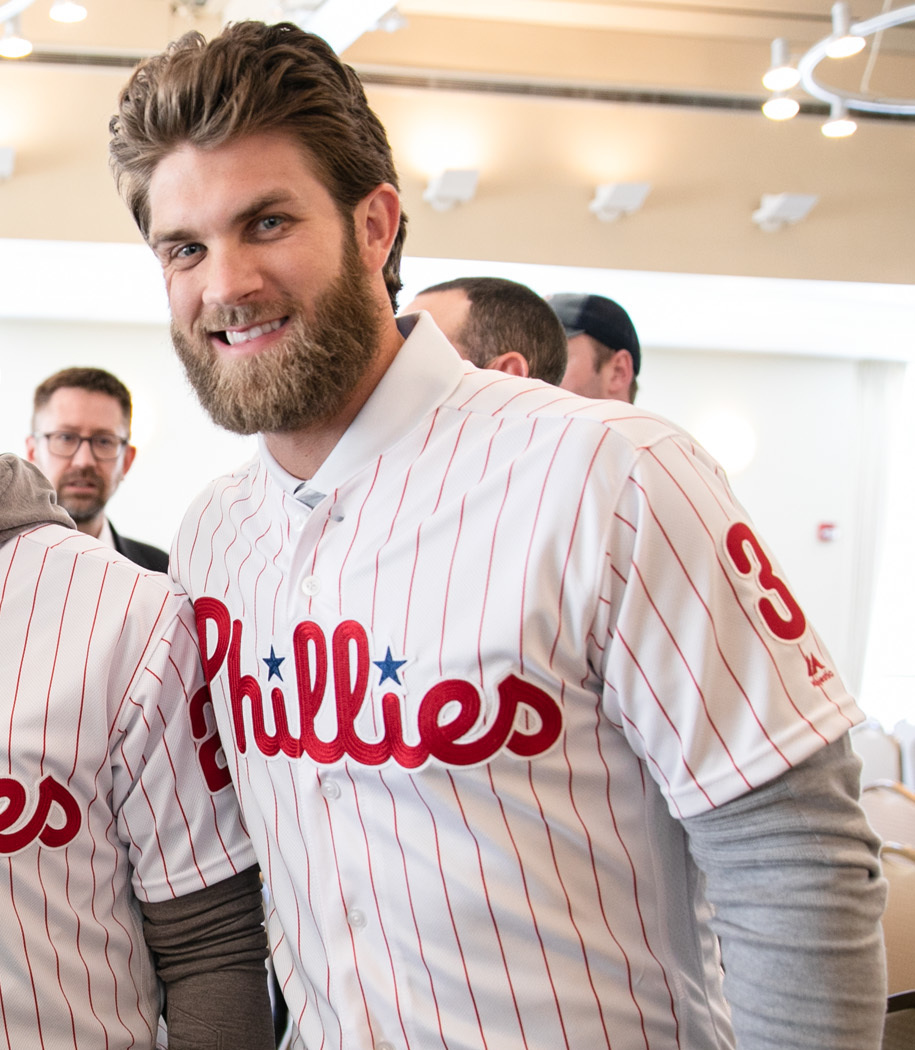
Bryce Harper hit the first of five home runs for the Phillies in Game 3.

November 1, 2022 8:03 pm (EDT) at Citizens Bank Park in Philadelphia, Pennsylvania 64 °F (18 °C), clear
Team	1	2	3	4	5	6	7	8	9	R	H	E
Houston	0	0	0	0	0	0	0	0	0	0	5	0
Philadelphia	2	2	0	0	3	0	0	0	X	7	7	0
WP: Ranger Suárez (1–0) LP: Lance McCullers Jr. (0–1); Home runs: HOU: None; PHI: Bryce Harper (1), Alec Bohm (1), Brandon Marsh (1), Kyle Schwarber (1), Rhys Hoskins (1); Attendance: 45,712; Boxscore

Originally scheduled for October 31, Game 3 was postponed to November 1 due to rain. Every following game was pushed back one day. Bernie Parent, Mike Schmidt, Julius Erving, and Brandon Graham threw ceremonial first pitches, and Chloe Bailey sang the national anthem. Ranger Suárez started for Philadelphia, taking the place of Noah Syndergaard, who would have started if it had not been postponed. Lance McCullers Jr. started for Houston.

In the bottom of the first, Kyle Schwarber drew a walk, and Bryce Harper hit a two-run home run to right field. Alec Bohm and Brandon Marsh hit solo home runs for the Phillies in the second. Bohm's solo home run to left field in the second inning marked the 1,000th home run in World Series history. When Marsh also homered in that inning, the Phillies became the first team to hit three home runs in the first two innings of a World Series game. In the bottom of the fifth, Schwarber hit a two-run home run to dead center, and Rhys Hoskins hit a solo home run to left, making the Phillies the fourth team to hit a record five home runs in a single World Series game, joining the 1928 Yankees (Game 4 of the 1928 World Series), 1989 Athletics (Game 3 of the 1989 World Series), and 2017 Astros (Game 5 of the 2017 World Series); they are also the only team of these four to go on to lose the World Series. Furthermore, McCullers became the first pitcher in history to surrender five home runs in a postseason game. Ryne Stanek relieved McCullers after Hoskins' home run. Suárez came out of the game after throwing five scoreless innings. Connor Brogdon, Kyle Gibson, Nick Nelson, and Andrew Bellatti each pitched a scoreless inning to complete the shutout as the Phillies won 7–0. All seven runs were scored via a home run.

=== Game 4 ===
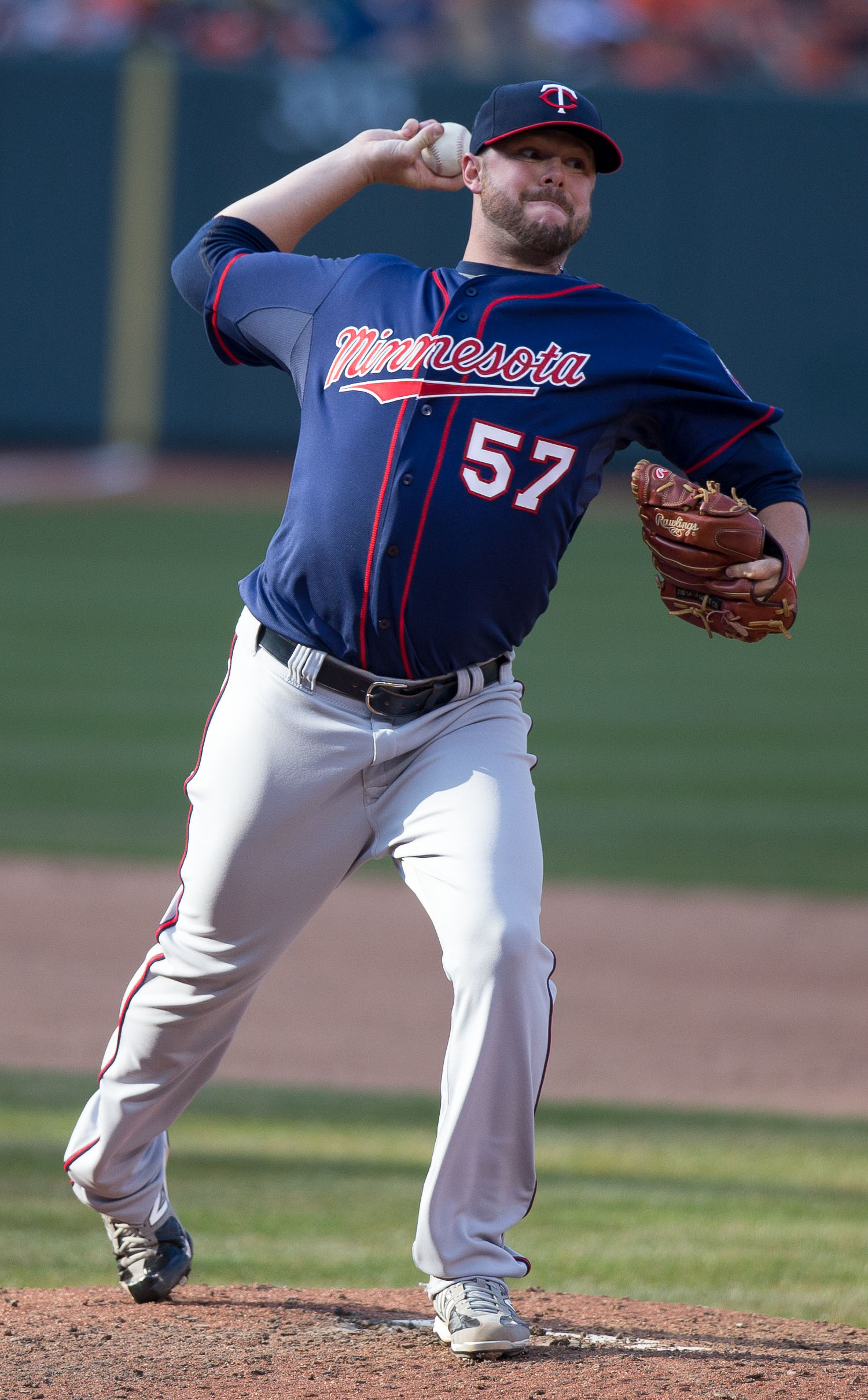
Ryan Pressly (pictured in 2013 with the Minnesota Twins) completed the combined no-hitter in Game 4.

November 2, 2022 8:03 pm (EDT) at Citizens Bank Park in Philadelphia, Pennsylvania 62 °F (17 °C), partly cloudy
Team	1	2	3	4	5	6	7	8	9	R	H	E
Houston	0	0	0	0	5	0	0	0	0	5	10	0
Philadelphia	0	0	0	0	0	0	0	0	0	0	0	0
WP: Cristian Javier (1–0) LP: Aaron Nola (0–1); Attendance: 45,693; Boxscore

External videos
- Game 4 full replay on the MLB's official YouTube channel

Jimmy Rollins and Chase Utley threw the ceremonial first pitch before Game 4 and American Idol contestant Madison Watkins sang the national anthem; Utley's pitch was caught by Rob McElhenney and Rollins' by Miles Teller. An additional first pitch was thrown out by a 19-year-old cancer survivor; Jill Biden was on hand to support Stand Up to Cancer in the middle of the fifth inning. Aaron Nola made his second start of the series for the Phillies, while Cristian Javier started for the Astros. The Astros and Phillies remained scoreless through four innings. The Astros loaded the bases in the top of the fifth inning against Nola. José Alvarado relieved Nola and hit Yordan Alvarez with a pitch, scoring the game's first run and breaking a 16-innings scoreless streak for Houston. The next batter, Alex Bregman hit a two-run double, Kyle Tucker followed with a sacrifice fly, and then Yuli Gurriel singled to score Bregman.

Javier pitched six innings on 97 pitches without allowing a hit, striking out nine batters, and walking two. He was relieved by Bryan Abreu, who struck out the side in the seventh inning. Rafael Montero pitched a hitless eighth inning for the Astros. Ryan Pressly, the Astros closer, pitched in the ninth inning for the Astros, only allowing a one-out walk to Kyle Schwarber, to complete the no-hitter. It was the first combined no-hitter in postseason history and the second no-hitter in the World Series after Don Larsen's perfect game in 1956. It was also the third no-hitter overall in postseason play, after Roy Halladay threw a no-hitter for the Phillies in the 2010 National League Division Series against the Cincinnati Reds. Coincidentally, both no-hitters took place at Citizens Bank Park, and Dusty Baker was involved as a manager in both as he had managed the Reds in 2010.

=== Game 5 ===
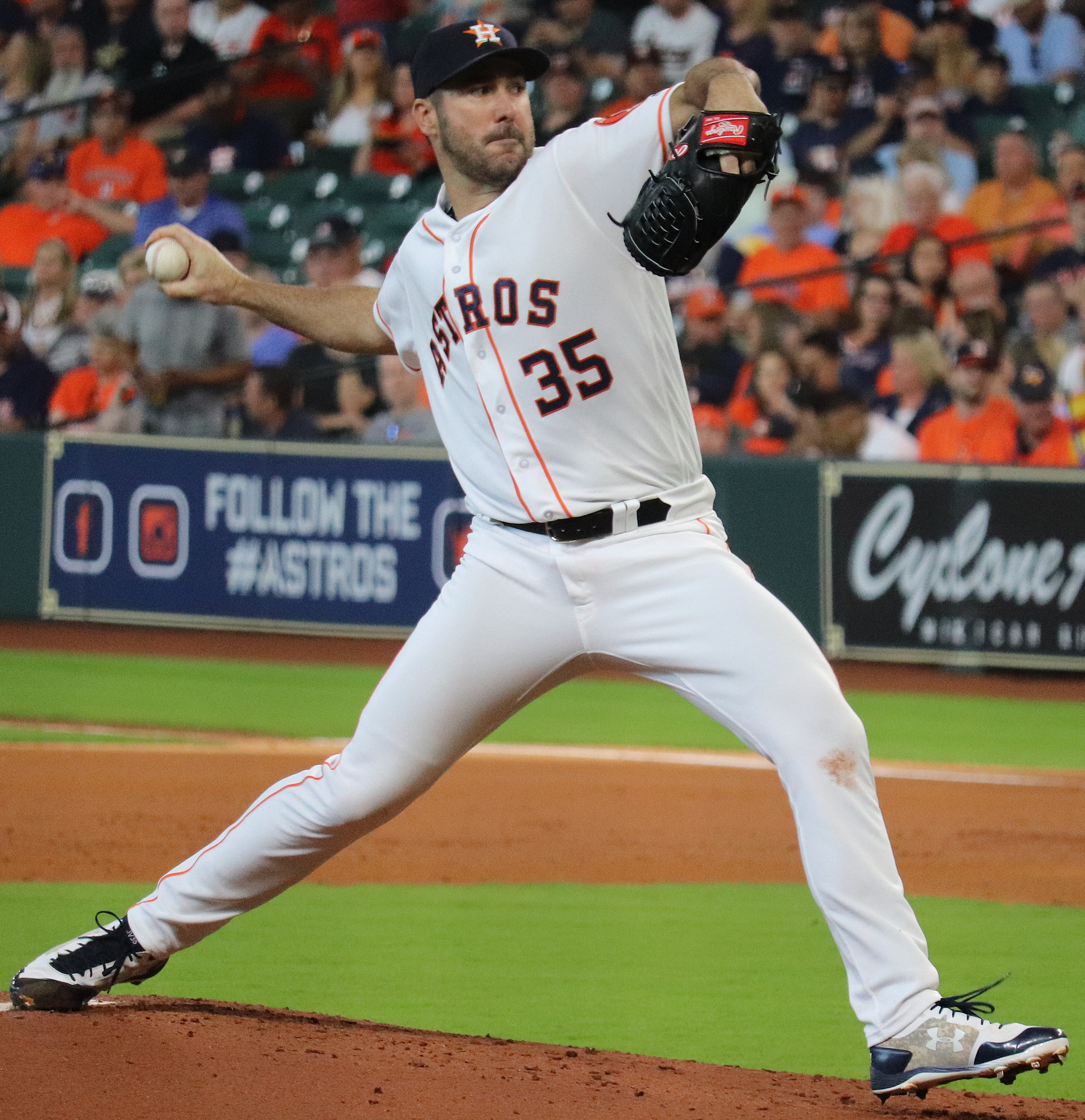
Justin Verlander earned his first career World Series win in Game 5.

November 3, 2022 8:03 pm (EDT) at Citizens Bank Park in Philadelphia, Pennsylvania 59 °F (15 °C), clear
Team	1	2	3	4	5	6	7	8	9	R	H	E
Houston	1	0	0	1	0	0	0	1	0	3	9	0
Philadelphia	1	0	0	0	0	0	0	1	0	2	6	1
WP: Justin Verlander (1–0) LP: Noah Syndergaard (0–1) Sv: Ryan Pressly (1); Home runs: HOU: Jeremy Peña (1); PHI: Kyle Schwarber (2); Attendance: 45,693; Boxscore

Before Game 5, Meek Mill performed his song "Dreams and Nightmares" and rode with the Phillie Phanatic on an ATV. Philadelphia native Jazmine Sullivan performed the national anthem and Brad Lidge threw the ceremonial first pitch to Carlos Ruiz. Noah Syndergaard started for the Phillies and Justin Verlander started for the Astros. The Phillies donned powder blue throwback uniforms from the 1970s and 1980s while the Astros wore their orange jerseys.

Jose Altuve led off the game with a double, advanced to third base on an error, and scored on a single by Jeremy Peña. Kyle Schwarber led off the bottom of the first inning with a home run to tie it. Schwarber's home run was the tenth given up by Verlander in the World Series, passing Catfish Hunter for the most allowed in World Series history. In the bottom of the second inning, Verlander struck out Rhys Hoskins to escape the bases-loaded jam to keep the game tied 1–1 after giving up a single to Jean Segura and walking both Brandon Marsh and Kyle Schwarber with two outs. Peña hit a home run to put the Astros ahead at 2–1 in the fourth inning, becoming the first rookie shortstop to hit a home run in the World Series. The Phillies, who had put runners in scoring position throughout the next four innings, did not score another run off of Verlander, who finished his appearance with six strikeouts and four walks allowed in five innings. In the top of the eighth inning, Altuve scored from third base on a ground out by Yordan Alvarez, widening the Astros' lead to 3–1. In the bottom of the eighth inning, Nick Castellanos scored on an RBI single by Jean Segura, narrowing the Phillies' deficit and putting runners on the corners. Ryan Pressly entered to try for a five-out save, his fourth appearance in the series. He recorded a strikeout and a hard-hit groundout to Trey Mancini to end the eighth inning. In the ninth inning, Chas McCormick made a leaping catch at the right-center wall on a flyball hit by J. T. Realmuto for the second out, preventing a likely extra-base hit. The next batter, Bryce Harper, was hit by a pitch, putting the tying run on first base, but Castellanos hit a groundball to short that led to the game-ending putout from Peña to Mancini to end the game. The victory was the first World Series pitching win of Verlander's career, who had gone 0–6 in his previous eight World Series starts, including Game 1.

The change in the World Series schedule due to rain meant Game 5 went up directly against a Thursday Night Football game between the NFL franchises of both World Series cities, in which the Philadelphia Eagles defeated the Houston Texans, 29–17. Estimates from Nielsen Media Research showed the baseball game drew an average of five million more viewers, with a share of at least 50 percent in both Philadelphia and Houston. Meanwhile, the football game, originally scheduled to air on the Fox affiliates in both markets per NFL rules, moved to the MyNetworkTV affiliates in both markets.

=== Game 6 ===
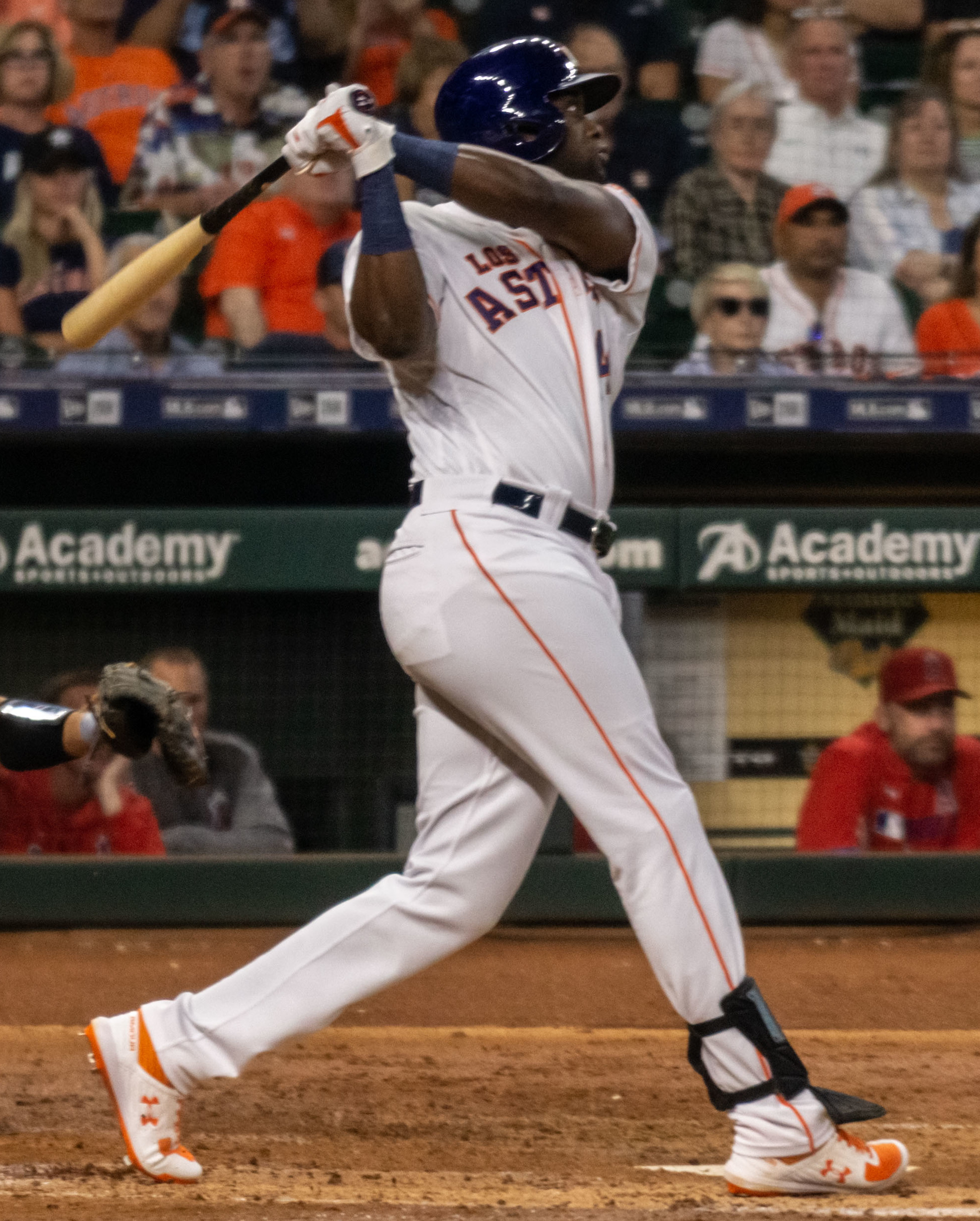
Yordan Alvarez hit a home run to center field, to a distance estimated at 450 feet, to give the Astros the lead in Game 6.

November 5, 2022 7:03 pm (CDT) at Minute Maid Park in Houston, Texas 73 °F (23 °C), roof closed
Team	1	2	3	4	5	6	7	8	9	R	H	E
Philadelphia	0	0	0	0	0	1	0	0	0	1	3	1
Houston	0	0	0	0	0	4	0	0	X	4	7	0
WP: Framber Valdez (2–0) LP: Zack Wheeler (0–2) Sv: Ryan Pressly (2); Home runs: PHI: Kyle Schwarber (3); HOU: Yordan Alvarez (1); Attendance: 42,958; Boxscore

Game 6 set the record for the latest date that a World Series game has been played. The latest World Series game had previously been played was November 4, in both 2001 and 2009. The Astros replaced Yuli Gurriel, who exited Game 5 with a knee injury, on their roster with Korey Lee. Gallery Furniture's Jim McIngvale threw the ceremonial first pitch, Andy Grammer sang the national anthem, and George Strait called "play ball!" In a rematch from Game 2, Framber Valdez started for the Astros, while Zack Wheeler started for the Phillies.

The game was initially a pitchers' duel between Valdez and Wheeler, with the game remaining scoreless through five innings. This was eventually broken by Kyle Schwarber hitting a solo home run to right field for the Phillies off of Valdez in the top of the sixth inning. In the bottom of the sixth, Wheeler hit Martin Maldonado with a pitch, which he and J. T. Realmuto argued he leaned into akin to Aledmys Diaz's attempt in Game 1, though this time the umpire ruled in favor of the Astros. Maldonado was eventually thrown out on a fielder's choice hit by Jose Altuve, before Jeremy Peña hit a single to allow Altuve to reach third. With runners on the corners, Wheeler was relieved by José Alvarado in preparation for Yordan Alvarez. Alvarado then gave up a three-run go-ahead home run to Alvarez, which flew 450 feet to center field and over the batter's eye. After walking Alex Bregman and striking out Kyle Tucker, Alvarado was relieved by Seranthony Dominguez. Bregman would advance to second on a wild pitch during Tucker's at-bat and subsequently score on an RBI single by Christian Vázquez, bringing the score to 4–1.

Following the four-spot in the sixth inning, Valdez was relieved by Hector Neris and Bryan Abreu, who each pitched an inning without allowing a baserunner. In the ninth, Ryan Pressly came in to save the game. Although Realmuto hit a single off of Pressly, Rhys Hoskins, Bryce Harper, and Nick Castellanos each popped out to the outfield, with Castellanos flying out to Tucker in foul territory for the final out and World Series' conclusion, as well as Pressly's sixth save of the postseason.

Jeremy Peña, who was 2-for-4 in Game 6 clincher, won the World Series Most Valuable Player Award. He batted 10-for-25 (.400) with one home run in the series. Peña became the first position player (and the third player overall) to win the award in his rookie season.

Manager Dusty Baker won his first career Fall Classic victory as a manager (after 3,884 games managed, a record for a first-time winner). With their victory, the Astros became the first (and as of 2025, only) team since the Red Sox in 2013 to clinch a World Series championship in their home stadium (the Dodgers won as the designated home team in 2020, but that was played at a neutral site due to the COVID-19 pandemic). In total for the postseason, the Houston bullpen allowed five total runs over 54 1/3 innings for an ERA of 0.83, becoming the first team to throw at least 40 postseason innings of the bullpen with an ERA below 1.00 in major league history. The Astros became the sixth team since 1960 to win the World Series after losing the previous year, with the last having been the Kansas City Royals in 2015.

With the win, the Astros finished 11–2 in the postseason, the fourth team to win a World Series while losing fewer than three games in the Wild Card era after the 1998 New York Yankees (11–2), the 1999 New York Yankees (11–1), and the 2005 Chicago White Sox (11–1).

=== Composite line score ===
2022 World Series (4–2): Houston Astros beat Philadelphia Phillies.

Team	1	2	3	4	5	6	7	8	9	10	R	H	E
Philadelphia Phillies	3	2	0	3	5	1	1	1	1	1	18	31	3
Houston Astros	4	2	3	1	7	4	0	1	0	0	22	48	2
Home runs: PHI: Kyle Schwarber (3), Alec Bohm (1), Bryce Harper (1), Rhys Hoskins (1), Brandon Marsh (1), J. T. Realmuto (1); HOU: Kyle Tucker (2), Yordan Alvarez (1), Alex Bregman (1), Jeremy Peña (1); Total attendance: 265,885 Average attendance: 44,314; Winning player's share: $516,347 Losing player's share: $296,255

== Broadcasting ==
=== Television ===
For the 23rd straight year, the World Series was televised in the United States by Fox, including the local affiliates WTXF-TV in Philadelphia and KRIV in Houston. Play-by-play announcer Joe Davis called the event for the first time, succeeding Joe Buck following the latter's departure from the network after 25 years as its lead World Series voice. Davis was joined by Baseball Hall of Famer John Smoltz as color analyst, and Ken Rosenthal and Tom Verducci as field reporters. Kevin Burkhardt hosted the pregame and postgame shows, joined by analysts Frank Thomas, Alex Rodriguez, and David Ortiz.

Outside of the United States, MLB Network produced an international feed through MLB International, which aired on Sportsnet in Canada, BT Sport in the United Kingdom, and ESPN in Australia. Dave Flemming called the play-by-play of the games for Anglophone viewers, with Dan Plesac as color analyst.

==== Ratings ====
Audience includes Fox and Fox Deportes

Game	Ratings (households)	U.S. audience (in millions)	Ref
1	5.69	11.68	
2	5.34	10.99	
3	6.11	11.37	
4	6.48	12.06	
5	6.92	13.01	
6	6.11	12.87	

Figures are per cited sourcing and subject to revision.

=== Radio ===
For the 25th consecutive year, ESPN Radio aired the series in the United States. Dan Shulman called the play-by-play, with Jessica Mendoza and Eduardo Pérez as color analysts and Buster Olney as field reporter. Kevin Winter and Doug Glanville hosted the pregame coverage. This was Shulman's 12th and final World Series broadcast for ESPN Radio, with Jon Sciambi succeeding him in 2023.

TUDN Radio broadcast the series in Spanish, with an announcing crew including Jesús Acosta, Enrique Burak, Alberto Ferreiro, José Luis Nápoles, Luis Eduardo Quiñones and Antonio de Valdes. The flagship radio stations for both teams broadcast the series locally. In Philadelphia, WIP-FM and WTTM aired the games in English and Spanish respectively, while KBME and KLAT did so in Houston. During the Phillies-Eagles conflict for Game 5, WIP-FM aired the Eagles game while the Phillies aired on KYW and WPHT.

== Sponsorship ==
The 2022 World Series was sponsored by Capital One, the credit card provider, as part of a new multi-year agreement. This sponsorship included logo branding in-stadium and on official digital properties on the field, as well as commercial inventory during Fox's telecasts of the games.

== Aftermath ==
This was the last World Series before expanded interleague play. Starting in 2023, MLB began scheduling all 30 teams to play each other throughout the season. As such, the Phillies defeated the Astros in two of three games in Houston from April 28–30, 2023 in a rematch of the World Series. Going forward, every World Series would be a rematch of a regular season series from earlier in the season. This was in opposite of World Series pre-1997 (the first year of Interleague play), which was the first time an American League team played a National League team in a season.

Houston businessman and Astros’ superfan Jim 'Mattress Mack' McIngvale won a record $75 million betting payout for his $10 million bet for Houston to win the World Series. This win was part of a strategy to hedge against a promotion for his furniture store, Gallery Furniture, where customers who spent a certain amount would get a refund if the Astros won. During the Series, a viral moment occurred when McIngvale attended Game 3 at Citizens Bank Park in Philadelphia. Phillies fans accosted and taunted McIngvale in the concourse area and accused second baseman Jose Altuve of cheating in the sign stealing scandal. McIngvale responded by repeatedly yelling "fuck you" at the fans. After the incident, McIngvale referred to Philadelphia sports fans as the "worst fans ever."

=== Houston ===
Shortly after his contract expired after the 2022 World Series, James Click rejected a one-year contract offer from the Astros, and the team announced that they would move on without Click. Click became the first GM since 1947 to leave an MLB franchise this quickly after winning the World Series. ESPN's Jeff Passan covered the shocking departure, characterizing owner Jim Crane as extremely hands-on and at odds with Click's management style. “Sometimes I wonder if [Crane] thinks he’s Jerry Jones,” one Astros employee told Passan. The Astros hired Atlanta Braves scout Dana Brown as their general manager on January 26, 2023. A few weeks later, the Toronto Blue Jays hired James Click to be the vice president of baseball strategy.

The Astros won the AL West in 2023, but they did not do so in dominant fashion like their teams from 2017 to 2019 and 2021 to 2022. Injuries and poor performance in their rotation saw the team trade young prospects for Justin Verlander at the trade deadline, who had signed a two-year deal with the New York Mets in the off-season. Overall, they finished tied with the Texas Rangers in first place in the AL West, but won the tie-breaker thus giving them the division. However, in the postseason, the Astros were beaten by the Rangers in the 2023 ALCS, with the visitor winning all seven games, similar to the 2019 World Series. After the season, Dusty Baker retired as manager, and the team promoted long-time bench coach Joe Espada to manager.

Although he was not on the Astros' World Series roster, closer Will Smith continued his unlikely streak of winning consecutive World Series with separate teams (he won with the Atlanta Braves in 2021, and would win his third consecutive title with the Rangers the following year).

=== Philadelphia ===
The Union lost the MLS Cup to the Los Angeles FC on the same day the Phillies lost Game 6, making Philadelphia the first city to ever lose two championship games on the same day. Three months later, the Philadelphia Eagles lost in Super Bowl LVII to the Kansas City Chiefs, suffering the third championship defeat of a Philadelphia sports team in as many months following the Union and the Phillies' losses. Coincidentally, Philadelphia achieved this dubious feat in 1980 when the 76ers, Flyers, and Eagles all lost in their respective championship games; however, the Phillies won the World Series that year.

After the season, Bryce Harper underwent Tommy John surgery for his ligament tear. Despite big free agent signings such as Trea Turner and Taijuan Walker, the Phillies started off similarly in 2023 as they did in 2022, particularly without Harper until May, sitting at a sub .500 record at the start of June. They would then get hot and go 65–42 from June until the rest of the season and finish as the first wildcard. They would again defeat the NL East-winning Atlanta Braves in the NLDS before being upset by the Arizona Diamondbacks in the NLCS by losing the team's first-ever game seven at home. With the Diamondbacks win, it was the second year in a row the sixth seed in the NL made the World Series, following the 2022 Phillies, and the third straight season a sub 90-win team made the World Series in the NL, following the 2022 Phillies and 2021 Braves.

== See also ==
- 2022 Japan Series
- 2022 Korean Series
