= 2021 World Series =

117th edition of Major League Baseball's championship series

Team (Wins)	Managers	Season
Atlanta Braves (4)	Brian Snitker	88–73 (.547), GA: 6½
Houston Astros (2)	Dusty Baker	95–67 (.586), GA: 5
- Dates: October 26 – November 2
- Venue(s): Truist Park (Atlanta); Minute Maid Park (Houston)
- MVP: Jorge Soler (Atlanta)
- Umpires: Ted Barrett, Dan Bellino, Chris Conroy, Tom Hallion (crew chief), Ron Kulpa, Alfonso Márquez, Mike Muchlinski

Broadcast
- Television: Fox (United States – English); Fox Deportes (United States – Spanish); MLB International (International)
- TV announcers: Joe Buck, John Smoltz, Ken Rosenthal and Tom Verducci (Fox); Adrian Garcia Marquez, Edgar Gonzalez and Carlos Álvarez (Fox Deportes); Scott Braun and Dan Plesac (MLB International)
- Radio: ESPN (United States – English); TUDN (United States – Spanish); WCNN (ATL – English); WAOS (ATL – Spanish); KBME (HOU – English); KLAT (HOU – Spanish)
- Radio announcers: Dan Shulman, Jessica Mendoza, Eduardo Pérez and Buster Olney (ESPN); Jesús Acostas, Alberto Ferreiro, José Luis Napoles and Luis Eduardo Quiñones (TUDN); Ben Ingram and Joe Simpson (WCNN); Daniel Cantú and Emanuel Zamarrón (WAOS); Robert Ford and Steve Sparks (KBME); Francisco Romero and Alex Treviño (KLAT)
- ALCS: Houston Astros over Boston Red Sox (4–2)
- NLCS: Atlanta Braves over Los Angeles Dodgers (4–2)

The 2021 World Series was the championship series of Major League Baseball's (MLB) 2021 season. The 117th edition of the World Series, it was a best-of-seven playoff between the National League (NL) champion Atlanta Braves and the American League (AL) champion Houston Astros. The series began on October 26 and concluded on November 2.

The Braves won the series four games to two. It was their fourth World Series title, their first since 1995, and their second in Atlanta—the first time they had won a second title in a city.

The Braves advanced to the World Series after winning the NL East division title. Atlanta then defeated the Milwaukee Brewers in the NL Division Series and the Los Angeles Dodgers in the NL Championship Series. The Astros advanced to the ALDS after winning the AL West. Houston then defeated the Chicago White Sox in the AL Division Series and the Boston Red Sox in the AL Championship Series.

The Astros had home-field advantage because they had a better regular-season record than the Braves. The series was played in a 2–3–2 format, with the Astros hosting Games 1, 2, and 6 (and 7 if it was necessary); and the Braves hosting Games 3, 4, and 5. The teams split the first two games, which were played at Minute Maid Park in Houston, and the Braves won Games 3 and 4 at Truist Park in Atlanta to take a 3–1 lead. The Astros won Game 5, returning the series to Houston. The Braves won Game 6 to win the World Series. Jorge Soler was awarded the World Series Most Valuable Player Award after batting .300 in the series with home runs in three of the Braves victories, each time giving them a lead they would never surrender. This would also be the final World Series where the designated hitter rule was used only in the American League ballpark.

== Background ==
The team with the better regular-season winning percentage, the Houston Astros, had home-field advantage in the series, thus hosting Games 1, 2, and 6 (and would have hosted Game 7 if needed).

The Astros and Braves had previously met in the postseason five times, in the National League Division Series when the Astros competed in the National League. Of those five series, the Braves won three (1997, 1999, and 2001) while the Astros won two (2004 and 2005). The Astros and Braves played in the National League West from 1969 to 1993. This was the first World Series to be played entirely in the Deep South.

The teams' jerseys lacked a World Series patch for the first time since 1997, though a patch was on their caps.

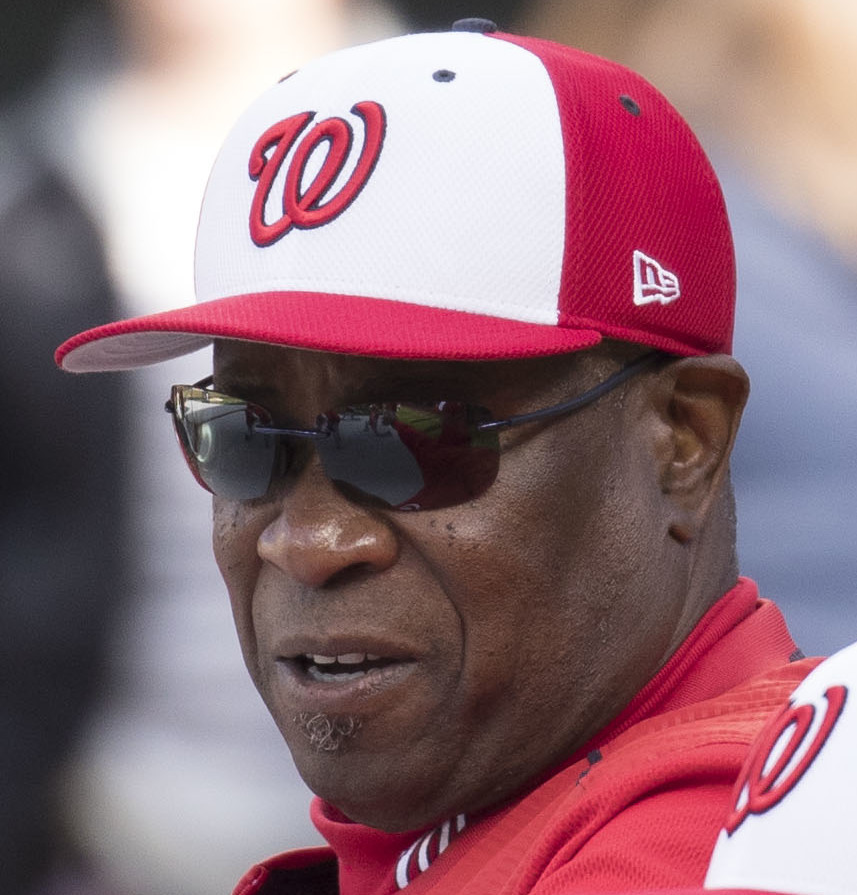

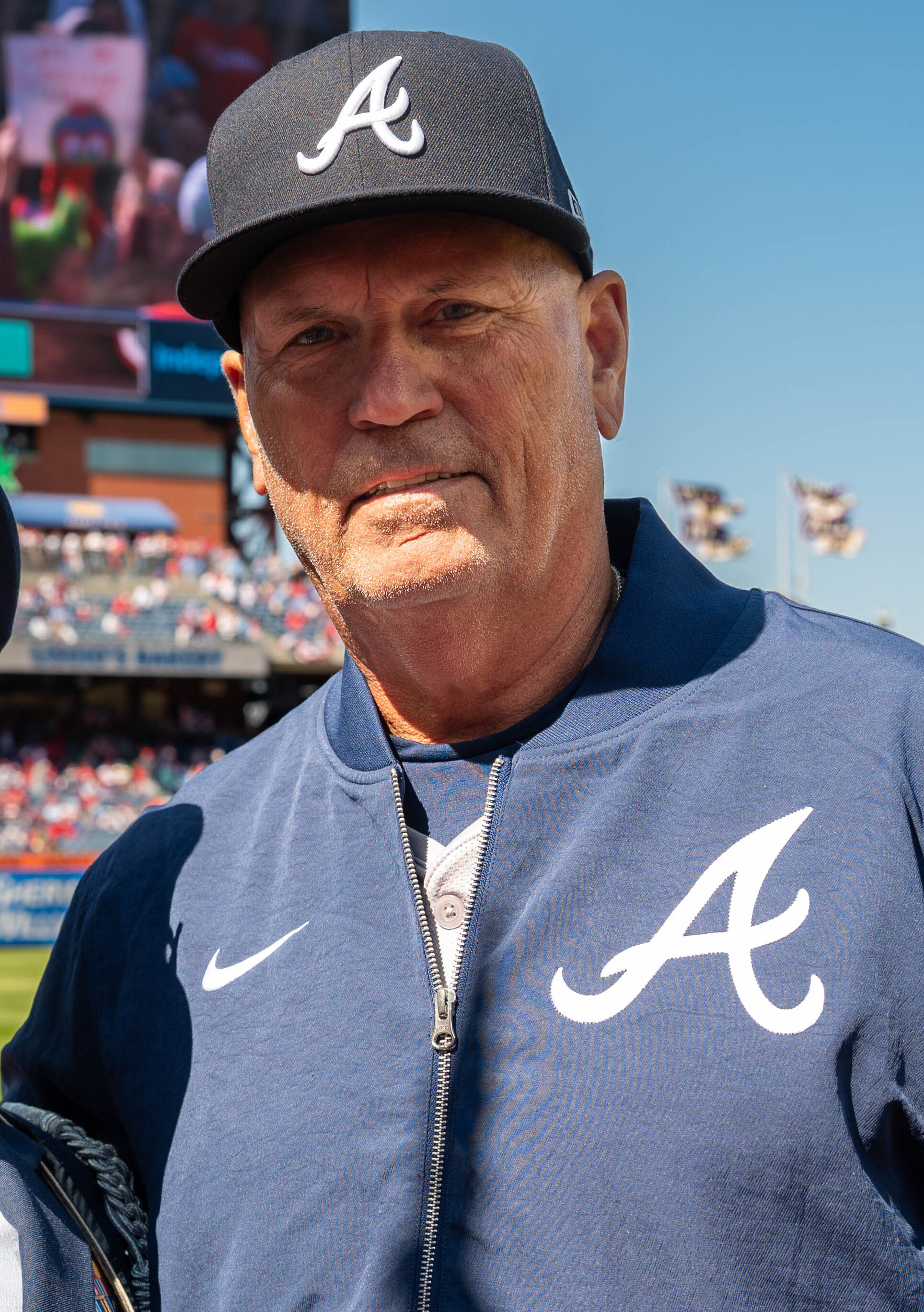
(Photo from 2024)

Managers Dusty Baker of the Astros (left) and Brian Snitker of the Braves

=== Atlanta Braves ===
The Atlanta Braves were managed by Brian Snitker, who joined the organization in 1977 and became their manager in 2016. The Braves qualified for the postseason after winning the National League East for the fourth straight season. They played four months with a winning percentage at .500 or below before finally surpassing .500 on August 6, the latest point in a season that an eventual league champion achieved a winning record. In the best-of-five National League Division Series, the third-seeded Braves defeated the Milwaukee Brewers in four games. In the best-of-seven National League Championship Series (NLCS), the Braves defeated the defending World Series champion Los Angeles Dodgers in six games. Left fielder Eddie Rosario was named NLCS MVP after hitting 14-for-25 (.560) with 3 home runs and 9 runs batted in in the series.

This was the Braves' first World Series appearance since 1999, tenth in franchise history, and sixth while in Atlanta. The Braves entered the series with three prior World Series titles, one as the Atlanta Braves in 1995 and one while based in each of their previous cities of Boston (1914) and Milwaukee (1957).

An Omaha World-Herald employee, Steven Elonich, predicted that the Braves would win the 2021 World Series in an article published in 2018. At that point, the Braves were coming off a three-year stretch that saw 278 combined losses — more than any three-year stretch by the franchise since 1988 through 1990.

=== Houston Astros ===
Under second-year manager Dusty Baker, the Houston Astros qualified for the postseason as the American League West division winner, having finished atop the division for the fourth time in five seasons. In the best-of-five American League Division Series, the second-seeded Astros defeated the Chicago White Sox in four games. In the best-of-seven American League Championship Series (ALCS), the Astros defeated the Boston Red Sox in six games, with designated hitter Yordan Alvarez named ALCS MVP after batting 12-for-23 (.522) in the series. Starting pitcher Lance McCullers Jr., who missed the ALCS due to a forearm strain suffered during the ALDS, was omitted from Houston's World Series roster due to that injury.

Baker became the ninth manager to win both American and National League pennants (having won the latter with the San Francisco Giants in 2002). Baker's gap of 19 years between appearances in the World Series is surpassed only by Bucky Harris, who managed in the 1925 and 1947 editions. At 72 years and 4 months old, Baker became the second-oldest manager in World Series history, the oldest having been Jack McKeon of the Florida Marlins in 2003, who was seven months older. Astros' hitting coach Troy Snitker is the son of Brian Snitker, the Braves manager. As a player, Baker was drafted by the Atlanta Braves in 1967 and spent seven seasons there.

This was the Astros' third World Series appearance in five years, having appeared in 2017 and 2019, and fourth overall, having also appeared in 2005 when they represented the National League. Their only prior World Series title came in 2017.

== Summary ==
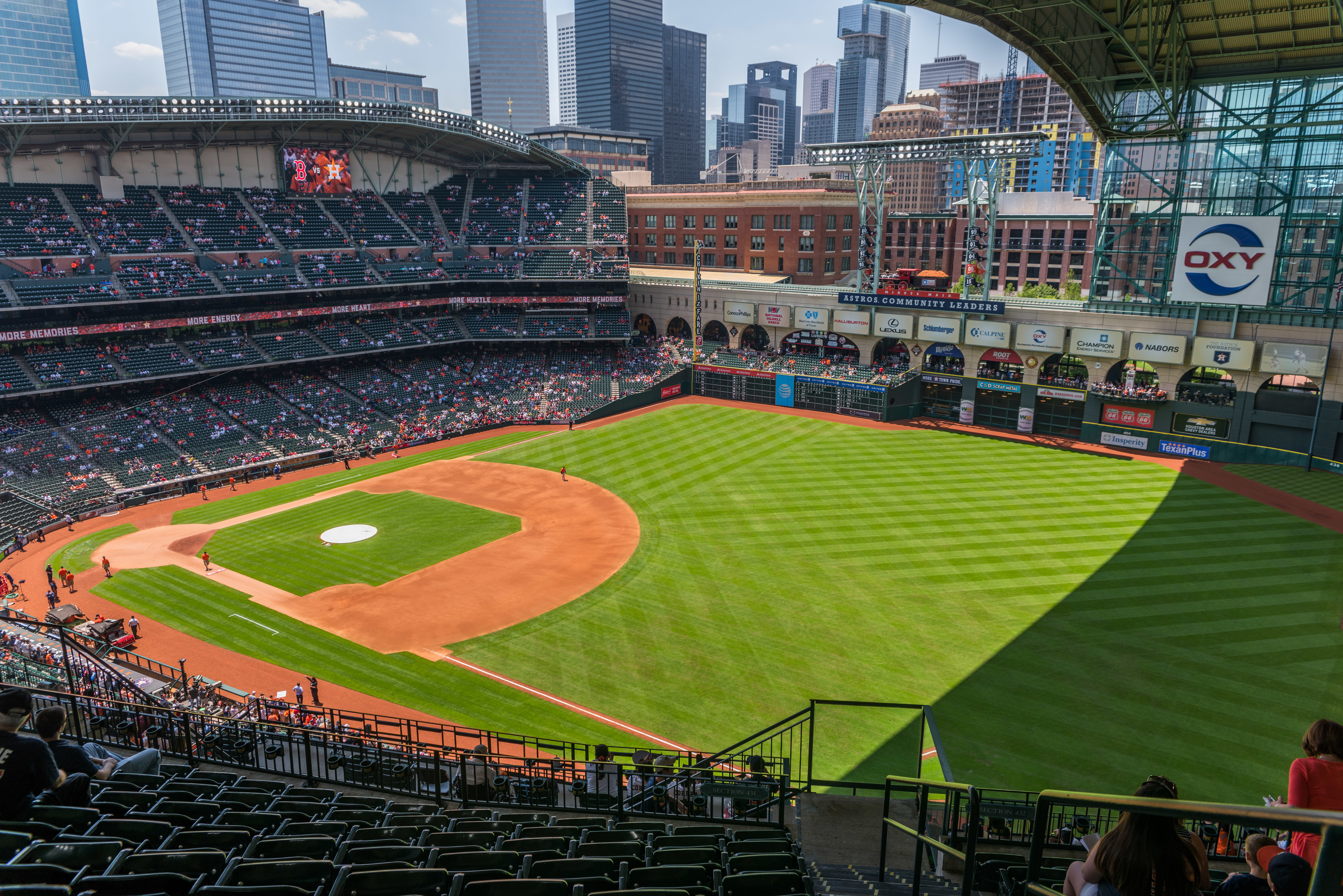
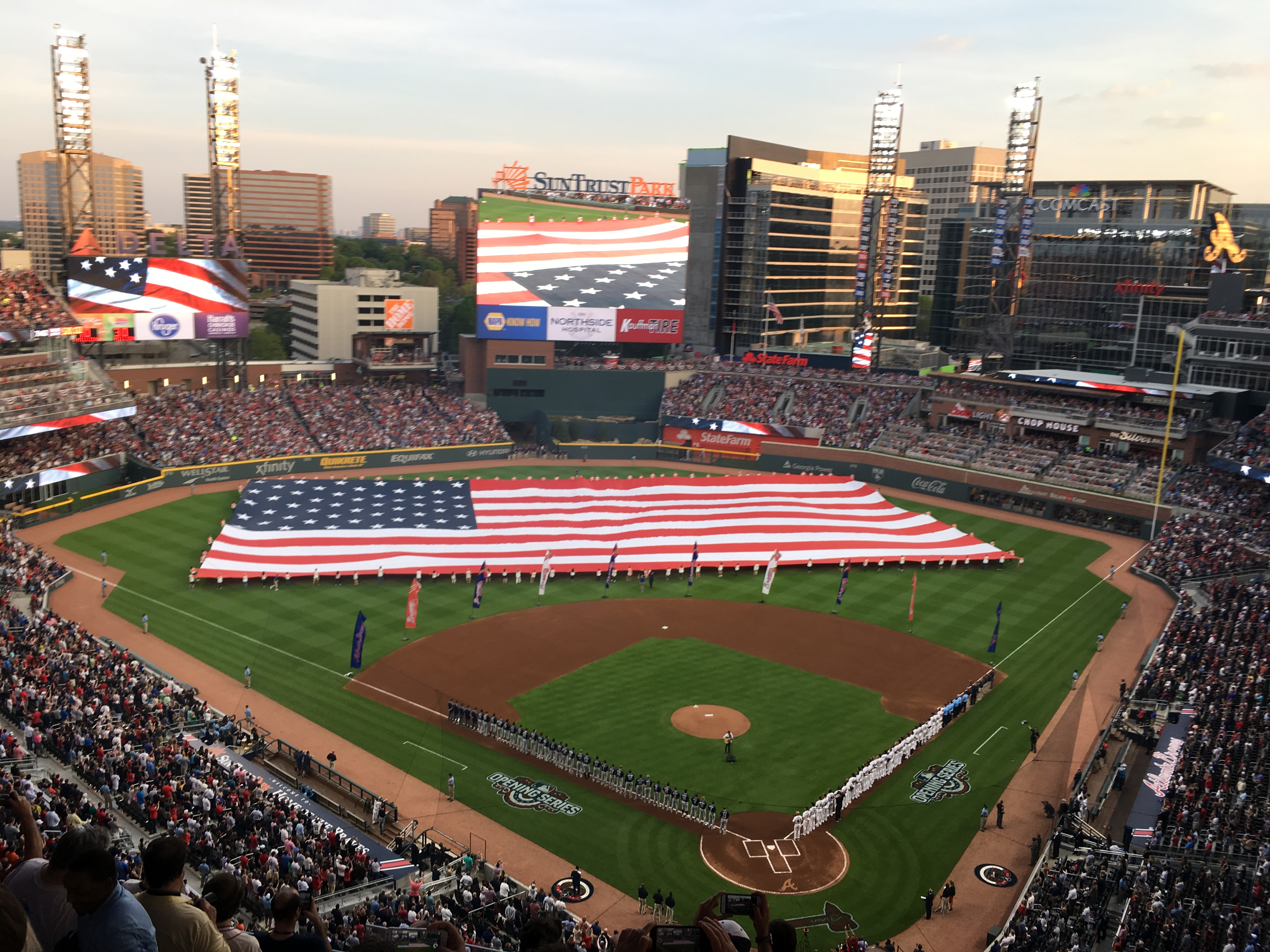
Minute Maid Park (top) and Truist Park

Atlanta won the series, 4–2.

Game	Date	Score	Location	Time	Attendance
1	October 26	Atlanta Braves – 6, Houston Astros – 2	Minute Maid Park	4:06	42,825
2	October 27	Atlanta Braves – 2, Houston Astros – 7	Minute Maid Park	3:11	42,833
3	October 29	Houston Astros – 0, Atlanta Braves – 2	Truist Park	3:24	42,898
4	October 30	Houston Astros – 2, Atlanta Braves – 3	Truist Park	3:45	43,125
5	October 31	Houston Astros – 9, Atlanta Braves – 5	Truist Park	4:00	43,122
6	November 2	Atlanta Braves – 7, Houston Astros – 0	Minute Maid Park	3:22	42,868

== Matchups ==
=== Game 1 ===
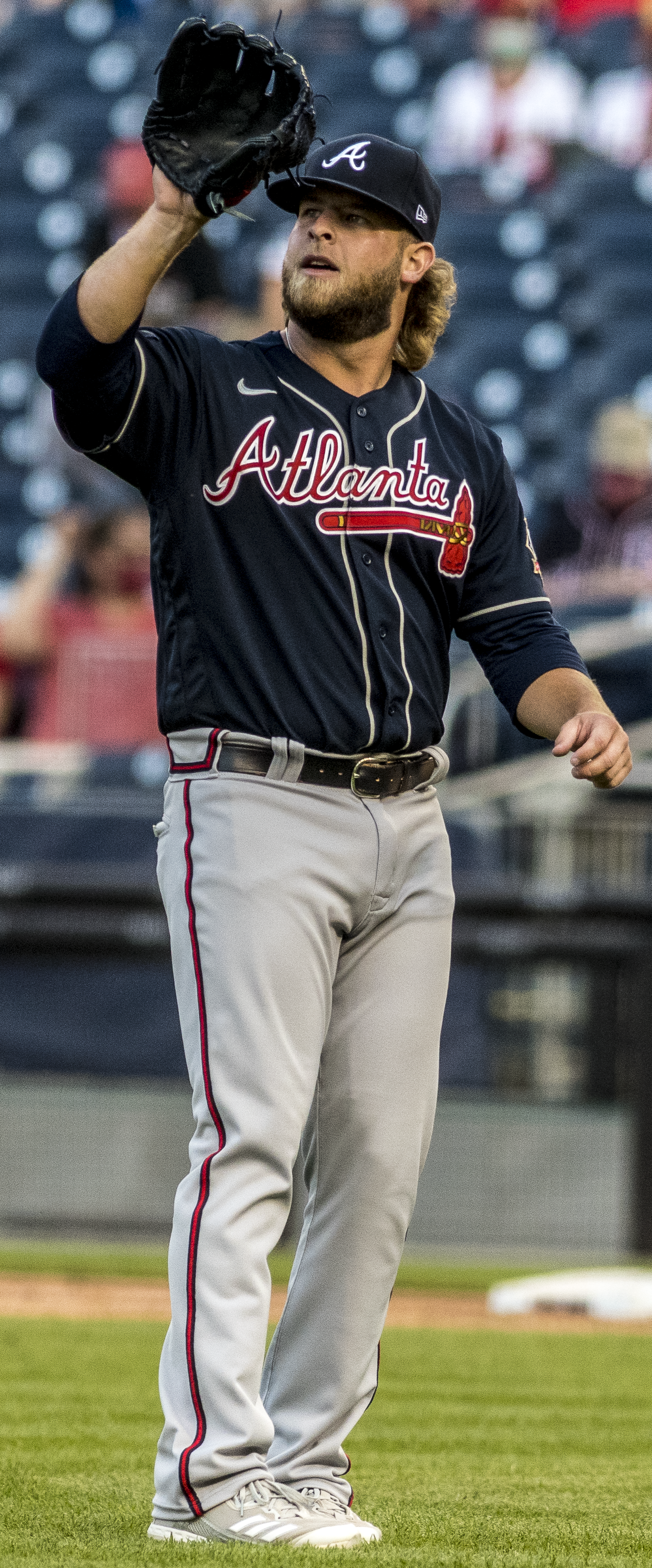
A. J. Minter entered Game 1 in relief of the injured Charlie Morton and earned the win.

October 26, 2021 7:11 pm (CDT) at Minute Maid Park in Houston, Texas, 73 °F (23 °C), roof closed
Team	1	2	3	4	5	6	7	8	9	R	H	E
Atlanta	2	1	2	0	0	0	0	1	0	6	12	1
Houston	0	0	0	1	0	0	0	1	0	2	8	1
WP: A. J. Minter (1–0) LP: Framber Valdez (0–1); Home runs: ATL: Jorge Soler (1), Adam Duvall (1); HOU: None; Attendance: 42,825; Boxscore

In pregame ceremonies, the national anthem was performed by Keke Palmer, and the ceremonial first pitch was thrown out by former Astro and National Baseball Hall of Fame inductee Craig Biggio.

Framber Valdez started for Houston while former Astro Charlie Morton started for Atlanta. Jorge Soler led off the World Series with a home run to left field for a 1–0 Atlanta lead after the first three pitches; he became the first player ever to lead off a World Series with a wall-clearing home run. A one-out single by Ozzie Albies followed by a double from Austin Riley gave the Braves a 2–0 lead. In the bottom of the first, the Astros had the bases loaded with two outs following a single and two walks, but Morton got Kyle Tucker to ground out, ending the threat. Atlanta added a run in the top of the second on two singles, a fly out, and a fielder's choice, making it 3–0. Freddie Freeman then singled and Albies beat out an infield grounder, loading the bases with two outs, but Valdez struck out Riley to end the inning. In the top of the third, Eddie Rosario singled, followed by a two-run home run from Adam Duvall, making it 5–0 Braves and driving Valdez from the game after 52 pitches.

Morton left in the bottom of the third inning with an injury; X-rays later revealed a fibular fracture in his right leg, causing him to miss the remainder of the series. The injury stemmed from a comebacker off the bat of Yuli Gurriel in the bottom of the second. It was unclear when Morton's leg was fractured; Braves manager Brian Snitker told reporters that X-rays taken in between innings revealed nothing wrong with Morton, though he said Morton's leg was "stressed." Morton threw 16 pitches following the injury, retiring the next three batters he faced and striking out two.

A. J. Minter was brought into the game; Michael Brantley hit a one-out double to right, but Minter retired the next two batters to end the inning. In the bottom of the fourth inning, Tucker hit a one-out double, advanced to third when Gurriel singled with one out, and scored on a fielder's choice, making it 5–1. In the top of the eighth, after three scoreless innings, Dansby Swanson walked, advanced to third on a single by Soler, and scored on a sacrifice fly by Freeman, extending Atlanta's lead to 6–1. In the bottom of the inning, Yordan Alvarez hit a lead-off triple and then scored on a groundout by Carlos Correa, making the score 6–2. In the bottom of the ninth, Atlanta closer Will Smith allowed only one walk, to Aledmys Díaz, as the Braves took a 1–0 lead in the series, their first World Series win since Game 2 in 1996, and ending an eight-game losing streak.

=== Game 2 ===
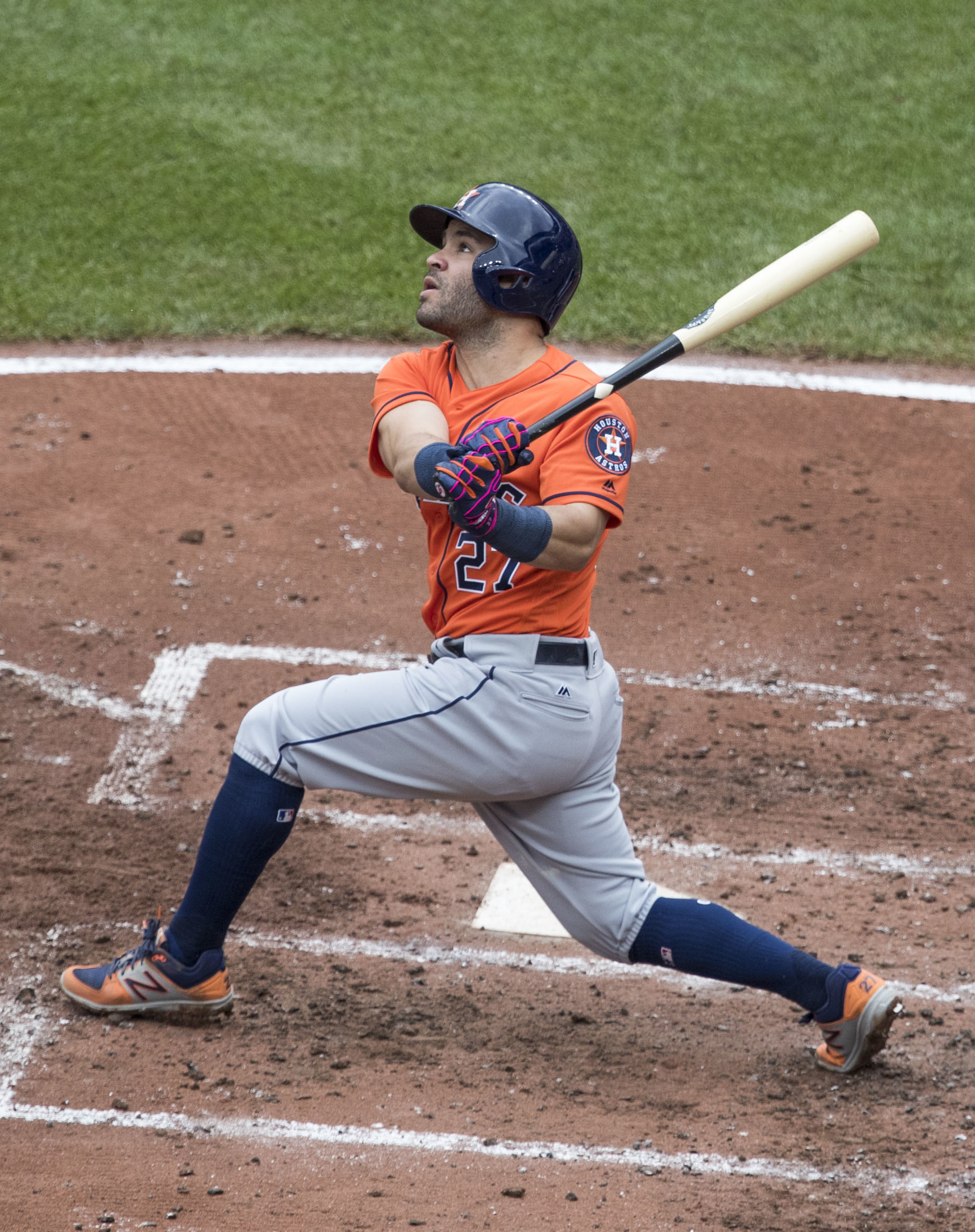
Jose Altuve hit the Astros' first home run of the series in Game 2.

October 27, 2021 7:09 pm (CDT) at Minute Maid Park in Houston, Texas, 73 °F (23 °C), clear
Team	1	2	3	4	5	6	7	8	9	R	H	E
Atlanta	0	1	0	0	1	0	0	0	0	2	7	2
Houston	1	4	0	0	0	1	1	0	X	7	9	0
WP: José Urquidy (1–0) LP: Max Fried (0–1); Home runs: ATL: Travis d'Arnaud (1); HOU: Jose Altuve (1); Attendance: 42,833; Boxscore

Before the game, Atlanta added Tucker Davidson to their roster in replacement of the injured Charlie Morton. Giavanni Walker, a petty officer first class in the United States Navy, sang the national anthem, and Hall of Famer Jeff Bagwell threw the ceremonial first pitch.

Max Fried started for Atlanta while José Urquidy started for Houston. In the bottom of the first inning, Jose Altuve doubled, advanced to third on a flyout by Michael Brantley, and scored on a sacrifice fly by Alex Bregman, giving Houston a 1–0 lead. In the top of the second, Atlanta tied the game, 1–1, via a solo home run to left field by Travis d'Arnaud, coming on a full count with two outs. In the bottom of the second, the Astros hit three consecutive one-out singles, retaking the lead, 2–1. With runners on first and second, Martín Maldonado delivered a base hit to the outfield, driving in another run. Braves left fielder Eddie Rosario tried to throw out José Siri advancing from first to third, but no Braves player was on the base resulting in an error and allowing Siri to score and making it 4–1. After Altuve lined out, Brantley singled to make it 5–1. In total, the Astros collected four runs on five singles, tying their club record for most hits in an inning in the World Series.

With two outs in the top of the fifth inning, Freddie Freeman delivered an RBI single to left, scoring d'Arnaud and cutting the Astros' lead to 5–2. Houston extended their lead to 6–2 in the sixth on a fielder's choice that scored Yordan Alvarez. The final run came in the bottom of the seventh inning, as Altuve homered on the first pitch by Drew Smyly, making it 7–2. It was the 22nd home run of Altuve's postseason career, tying him with Bernie Williams for the second-most all-time. (Note: Manny Ramirez hit 29 postseason home runs.) This was the first victory by the home team in a World Series since 2018. (Note: All seven games of the 2019 World Series were won by the away team, while the 2020 World Series was played at a neutral site.)

=== Game 3 ===
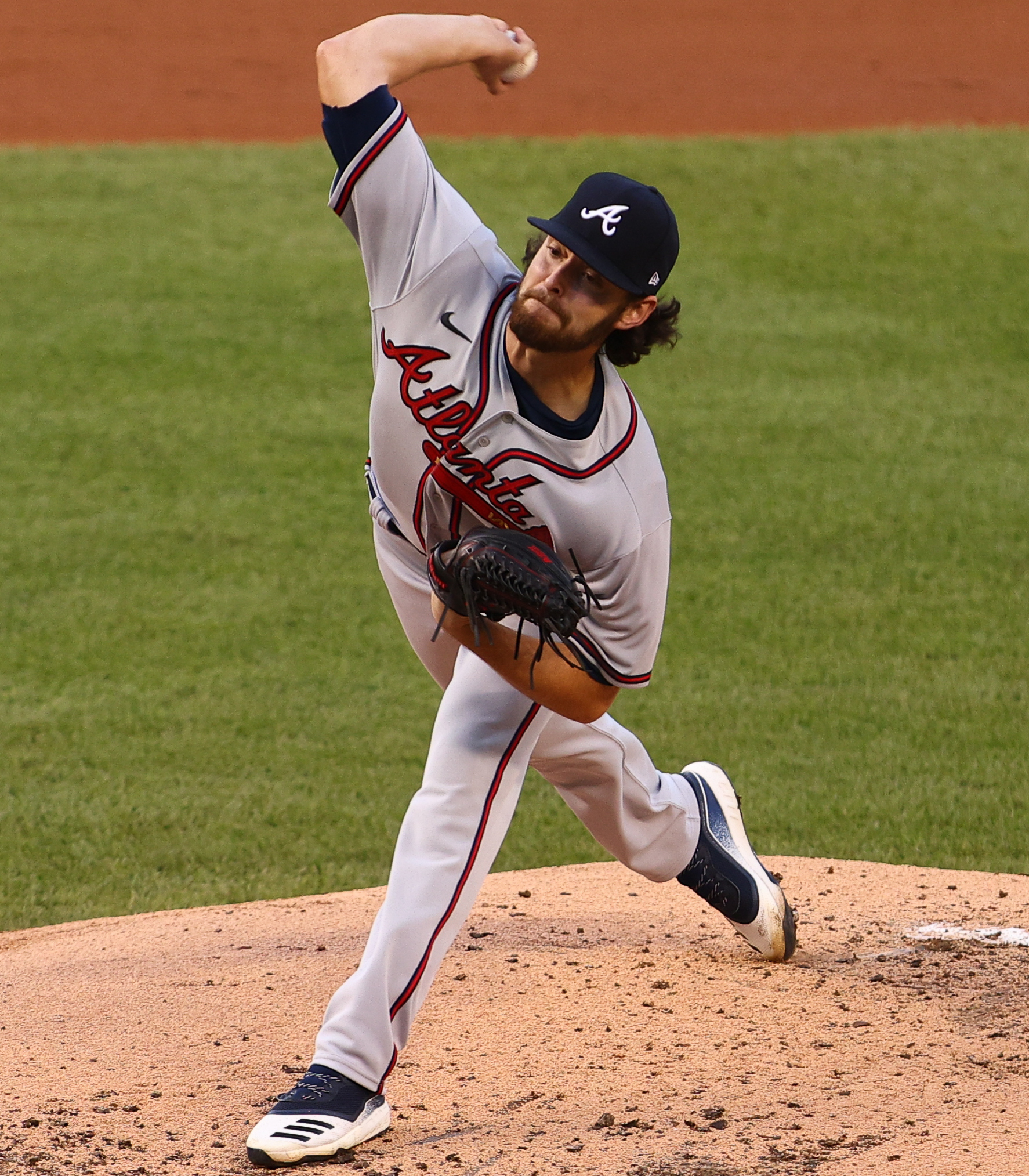
Ian Anderson threw five no-hit innings as Atlanta's starting pitcher in Game 3.

October 29, 2021 8:12 pm (EDT) at Truist Park in Cumberland, Georgia, 49 °F (9 °C), drizzle
Team	1	2	3	4	5	6	7	8	9	R	H	E
Houston	0	0	0	0	0	0	0	0	0	0	2	0
Atlanta	0	0	1	0	0	0	0	1	X	2	6	1
WP: Ian Anderson (1–0) LP: Luis García (0–1) Sv: Will Smith (1); Home runs: HOU: None; ATL: Travis d'Arnaud (2); Attendance: 42,898; Boxscore

In pregame ceremonies, the ceremonial first pitch was thrown out by Hank Aaron Jr., as his father was honored before the game; the national anthem was performed by Zac Brown. This was the first World Series game ever played at Truist Park, (Note: Truist Park opened in 2017.) and the first played in Atlanta since 1999. Ian Anderson started for Atlanta while Luis García started for Houston, marking the first time two rookie pitchers started against each other in a World Series since Justin Verlander and Anthony Reyes opened Game 1 in 2006.

After two and a half scoreless innings, the Braves scored on an RBI double by Austin Riley that drove in Eddie Rosario in the bottom of the third inning. García was relieved after 3 2/3 innings, having allowed one run on three hits while striking out six batters. Anderson allowed no hits, three walks, and one hit batsman while striking out four in five innings. The Astros remained hitless through seven innings, as A. J. Minter and Luke Jackson did not allow a hit in the sixth or seventh, respectively. Tyler Matzek started the eighth for the Braves and allowed a bloop single to Aledmys Díaz, who was replaced by José Siri as a pinch-runner. With two outs, Siri stole second and advanced to third on a throwing error by Travis d'Arnaud, but was left on base as Michael Brantley popped out. In the bottom of the eighth, d'Arnaud hit a solo home run to extend Atlanta's lead to 2–0. That home run was the first time home runs were hit in back-to-back games by the same player since Ryan Klesko did so in the 1995 World Series. d'Arnaud became the first catcher to do this since Roy Campanella did so for the Dodgers in the 1955 World Series. Will Smith, Atlanta's closer, pitched in the top of the ninth inning. He allowed a leadoff single to Alex Bregman, then retired the next three batters, giving Atlanta a 2–1 lead in the series. The seven-inning no-hit bid by the Atlanta pitching staff was the longest in a World Series game since Jim Lonborg of the Boston Red Sox went 7 2/3 innings before allowing a hit in Game 2 of the 1967 World Series. This was the first shutout in the World Series since Game 3 of the 2016 World Series.

=== Game 4 ===
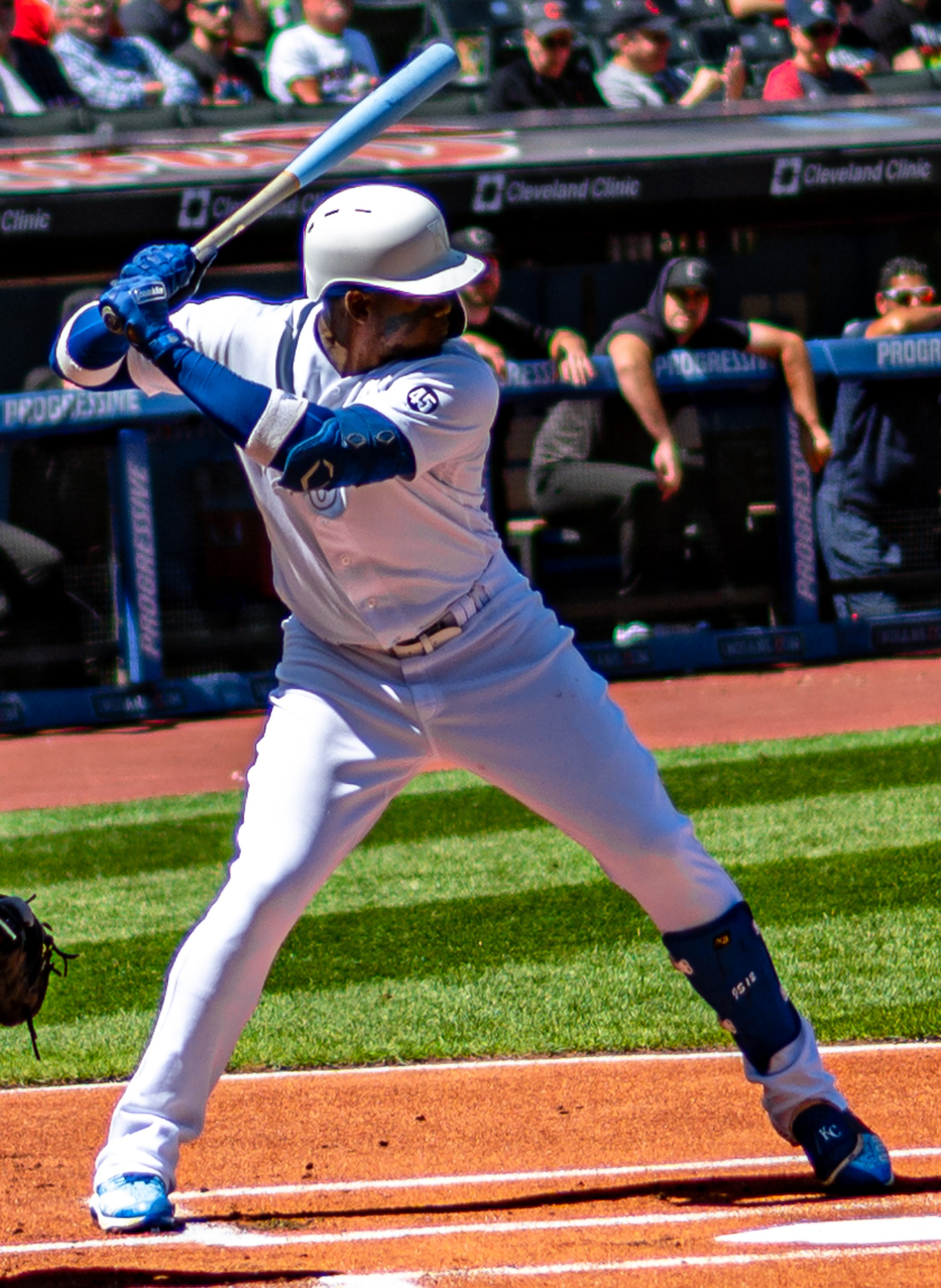
Jorge Soler's pinch-hit home run was the deciding run of Game 4.

October 30, 2021 8:11 pm (EDT) at Truist Park in Cumberland, Georgia, 53 °F (12 °C), cloudy
Team	1	2	3	4	5	6	7	8	9	R	H	E
Houston	1	0	0	1	0	0	0	0	0	2	8	0
Atlanta	0	0	0	0	0	1	2	0	X	3	8	1
WP: Tyler Matzek (1–0) LP: Cristian Javier (0–1) Sv: Will Smith (2); Home runs: HOU: Jose Altuve (2); ATL: Dansby Swanson (1), Jorge Soler (2); Attendance: 43,125; Boxscore

Prior to the game, the Astros replaced backup catcher Jason Castro on their roster with Garrett Stubbs, due to COVID-19 protocols. The ceremonial first pitch was thrown out by cancer survivor Elizabeth O’Connor, and the national anthem was performed by Jordan Fisher. Zack Greinke started for Houston, while Dylan Lee acted as an opener for Atlanta in his first MLB start. Greinke was placed eighth in Houston's batting order, the first starting pitcher in a World Series game not to bat ninth since Babe Ruth in Game 4 of the 1918 World Series.

In the top of the first, Lee allowed a hit to Jose Altuve while issuing two walks and recording one strikeout, then was relieved by Kyle Wright. Altuve scored on a ground out by Carlos Correa to give the Astros an early 1–0 lead. Altuve hit a solo home run in the top of the fourth to extend Houston's lead to 2–0. It was Altuve's second home run of the series and the second and final one that the Astros would hit. Greinke exited after four innings, having allowed no runs on four hits while striking out three and walking none. In the bottom of the sixth, Atlanta had runners at first and second with one out, via a double and a walk. Houston reliever Phil Maton entered, struck out Ozzie Albies, and allowed a hit to Austin Riley that scored a run, cutting the lead to 2–1. After an intentional walk to Joc Pederson that loaded the bases with two outs, Maton struck out Travis d'Arnaud to end the rally. Back-to-back solo home runs by Dansby Swanson and Jorge Soler off of Cristian Javier with one out in the bottom of the seventh put Atlanta ahead, 3–2. After a scoreless eighth inning, Atlanta closer Will Smith entered to pitch the top of the ninth. He retired the side for his second save in two days, as Atlanta took a 3–1 lead in the series.

=== Game 5 ===
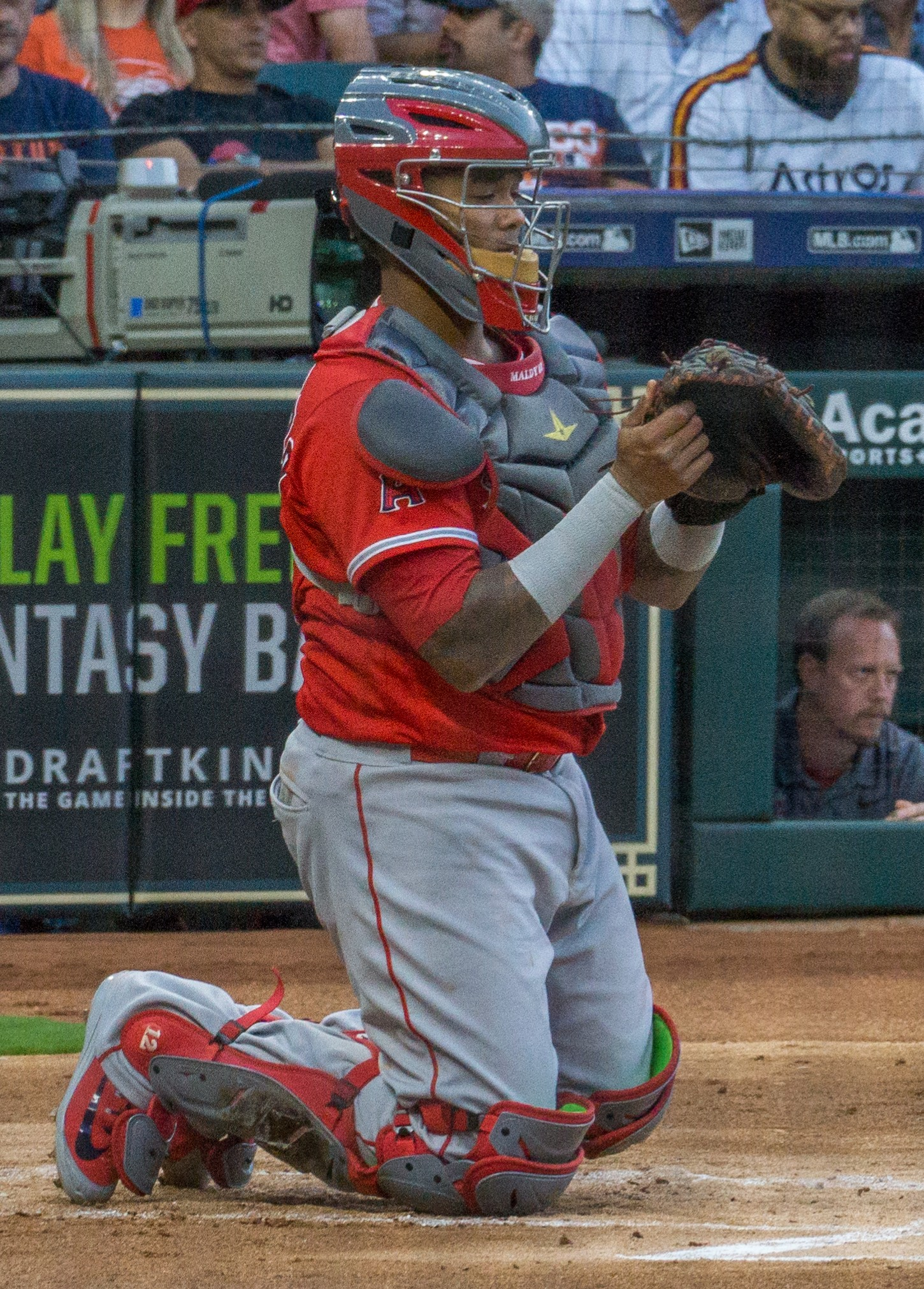
Martín Maldonado had three runs batted in during Game 5.

October 31, 2021 8:15 pm (EDT) at Truist Park in Cumberland, Georgia, 52 °F (11 °C), partly cloudy
Team	1	2	3	4	5	6	7	8	9	R	H	E
Houston	0	2	2	0	3	0	1	1	0	9	12	0
Atlanta	4	0	1	0	0	0	0	0	0	5	8	1
WP: José Urquidy (2–0) LP: A. J. Minter (1–1); Home runs: HOU: None; ATL: Adam Duvall (2), Freddie Freeman (1); Attendance: 43,122; Boxscore

Hall of Fame inductee Greg Maddux threw out the ceremonial first pitch, and Lauren Alaina performed the national anthem. Framber Valdez started for Houston, while Tucker Davidson started for Atlanta; Davidson had not played in an MLB game since June 15, 2021.

Adam Duvall hit a grand slam for Atlanta with two outs in the bottom of the first inning, the first grand slam in the first inning of a World Series game since 1960. The Astros scored two runs in the second inning, with an RBI double by Alex Bregman and a sacrifice fly by Martín Maldonado. Houston scored twice more in the top of the third, coming on an error, walk, double, and ground out, to make it a 4–4 tie game. A solo home run by Freddie Freeman in the bottom of the inning put the Braves back ahead, 5–4. Both managers brought in relief pitchers during the third inning. The Astros tied the game at 5–5 in the fifth inning when Maldonado drew a walk with the bases loaded, and then scored two more runs on a single by Marwin González to take a 7–5 lead. The Astros added a run in the seventh on an RBI single by Maldonado, and a run in the eighth on an RBI single by Carlos Correa, making it 9–5. Kendall Graveman pitched the final two innings for Houston, holding the four-run lead as the Astros avoided elimination and sent the series back to Houston.

Zack Greinke singled for Houston in the fourth inning as a pinch hitter, becoming the first pitcher with a pinch hit in a World Series game since Jack Bentley of the New York Giants in 1923. Game 5 of the 2021 World Series marked the last game to date in which the designated hitter rule was not used. Starting in 2022, the National League added the DH permanently. This made Greinke the last pitcher to get a hit in the postseason until Shohei Ohtani did it during the 2025 postseason. Additionally, Freeman's home run in this game is the furthest-hit home run in the World Series since the beginning of distance tracking in 2015, at 460 feet.

This is the last World Series game to date to be played on a Sunday, as beginning in 2022 MLB changed the schedule to have the series open on Friday, in part to avoid playing on Sunday and thus going head-to-head with the NFL and NBC Sunday Night Football.

=== Game 6 ===
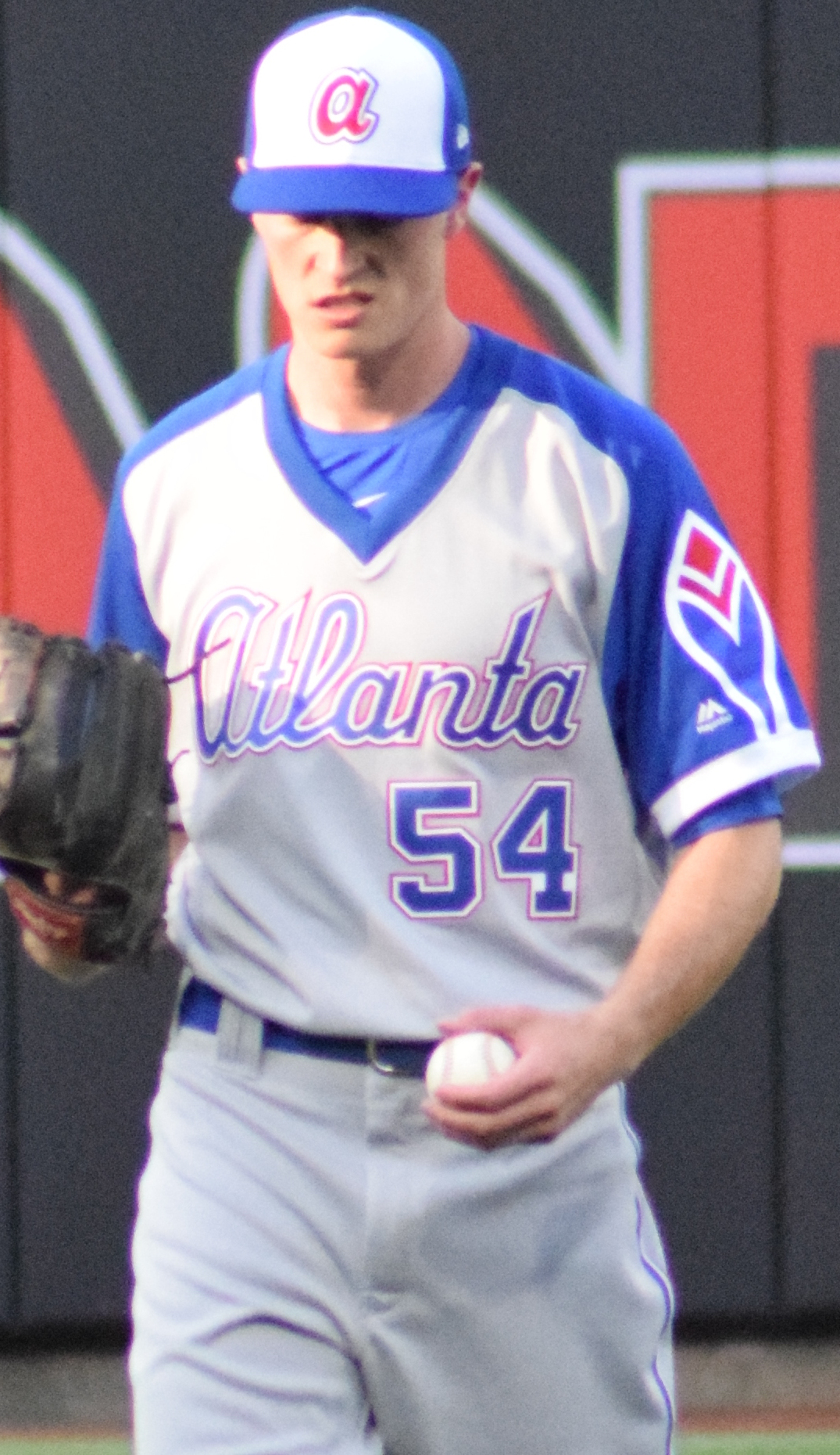
Max Fried pitched six scoreless innings in Game 6 and earned the win.

November 2, 2021 7:10 pm (CDT) at Minute Maid Park in Houston, Texas, 72 °F (22 °C), partly cloudy
Team	1	2	3	4	5	6	7	8	9	R	H	E
Atlanta	0	0	3	0	3	0	1	0	0	7	7	1
Houston	0	0	0	0	0	0	0	0	0	0	6	0
WP: Max Fried (1–1) LP: Luis García (0–2); Home runs: ATL: Jorge Soler (3), Dansby Swanson (2), Freddie Freeman (2); HOU: None; Attendance: 42,868; Boxscore

A "Rally Nun" (Note: The "Rally Nuns" are members of the Dominican Sisters of Mary Immaculate Province, based in Houston.) threw out the ceremonial first pitch, and country music artist Carly Pearce sang the national anthem. Before the game, Johan Camargo replaced Ehire Adrianza on the Braves' roster as Adrianza was placed on the paternity list. Luis García started for Houston and Max Fried started for Atlanta. The Braves took a 3–0 lead in the top of the third inning on a single and walk followed by a towering two-out home run by Jorge Soler that left Minute Maid Park over the raised train tracks in left field. Garcia exited after Soler's home run, having pitched 2 2/3 innings while striking out three batters. In the top of the fifth, a two-run home run by Dansby Swanson followed by a walk then a two-out double by Freddie Freeman extended Atlanta's lead to 6–0. In the top of the seventh, Freeman hit a solo home run with two outs to make it 7–0. Tyler Matzek entered in relief in the bottom of the seventh; Fried allowed no runs on four hits while striking out six batters and walking none in six innings. Atlanta closer Will Smith was brought in to pitch the bottom of the ninth. He allowed a leadoff single to Michael Brantley and retired the next three batters, the last out being a Yuli Gurriel infield grounder fielded by Swanson, who threw to Freeman, giving the Braves the title. Afterwards, Jorge Soler was named the World Series Most Valuable Player.

The much maligned Braves bullpen turned out to be the team's biggest strength during their World Series run. The bullpen was dominant throughout the postseason with the late-inning combination of Will Smith, Tyler Matzek, Luke Jackson, and A.J. Minter leading the way. Closer Will Smith struggled at times during the regular season having posted a 3.44 ERA, particularly with a 5.40 ERA during the dog days of a close NL East division race in August. Those struggles however disappeared for Smith in the postseason, as the veteran reliever worked 11 consecutive scoreless innings in October allowing only five hits, three walks, and eight strikeouts with six saves. For their success, the media nicknamed them ‘The Night Shift’, however, Luke Jackson later stated he was the one that came up with the name.

With the World Series victory, Joc Pederson became a back-to-back World Series winner on two different teams, joining Jack Morris, Ryan Theriot, Jake Peavy and Ben Zobrist as the only players to have accomplished that feat. Pederson had become a fan-favorite throughout his three-month stay in Atlanta, particularly for his preference for wearing pearls.

This was the Braves first time clinching a postseason series on the road since the 1999 National League Division, which coincidentally also came against Houston at the now-defunct Astrodome. This was the Braves fourth championship, winning one each in their previous two cities, Boston and Milwaukee, and now two in Atlanta.

=== Series statistics ===
2021 World Series (4–2): Atlanta Braves beat Houston Astros.

Team	1	2	3	4	5	6	7	8	9	R	H	E
Atlanta Braves	6	2	7	0	4	1	3	2	0	25	48	7
Houston Astros	2	6	2	2	3	1	2	2	0	20	45	1
Home runs: ATL: Jorge Soler (3), Travis d'Arnaud (2), Adam Duvall (2), Freddie Freeman (2), Dansby Swanson (2); HOU: Jose Altuve (2); Total attendance: 257,671 Average attendance: 42,945; Winning player's share: $397,331 Losing player's share: $258,373

== Broadcasting ==
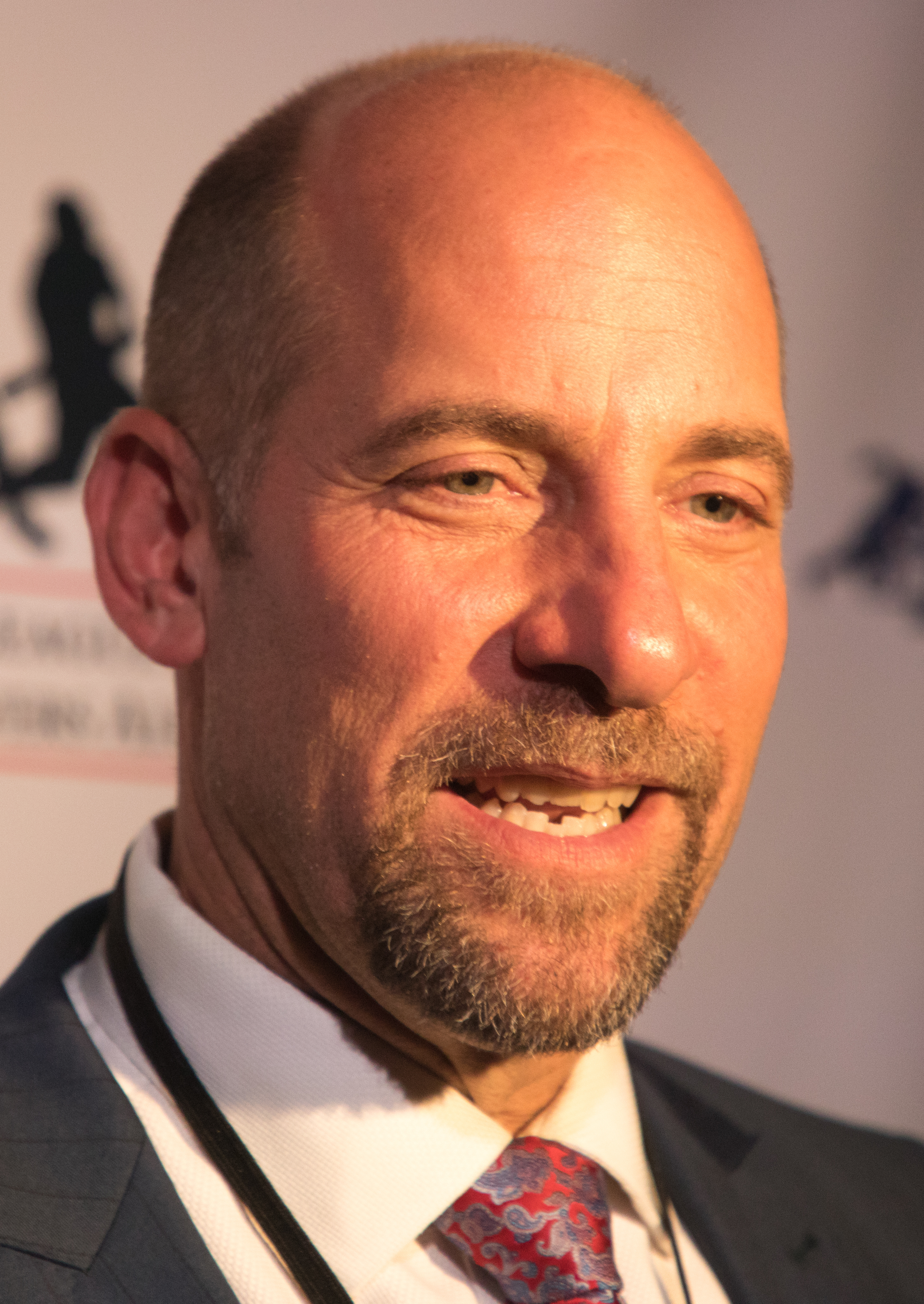
John Smoltz, color analyst for Fox

=== Television ===
For the 22nd straight year, the World Series was televised in the United States by Fox (including the local affiliates WAGA-TV in Atlanta and KRIV in Houston). Joe Buck called the games as a play-by-play announcer, along with Hall of Famer and former Braves pitcher John Smoltz as color analyst and Ken Rosenthal and Tom Verducci as field reporters. Kevin Burkhardt hosted the pregame and postgame shows, joined by analysts Frank Thomas, Alex Rodriguez, David Ortiz, and Dontrelle Willis. This was the last of Buck’s record 24 World Series telecasts for Fox, and Game 6 was the final Major League Baseball event and one of the last major sporting events he called on the network (his final broadcast on Fox was the 2021 NFC Championship Game).

MLB International fed the series to broadcasters outside the United States, with Scott Braun providing play-by-play and Dan Plesac as color commentator. The MLB International feed was produced by MLB Network.

==== Ratings ====
Game	Ratings (households)	Share (households)	U.S. audience (in millions)	Ref
1	6.1		11.08	
2	5.8		10.54	
3	6.1		11.47	
4	5.65		10.78	
5	7.4		13.82	
6	7.9		14.14	

Figures are per cited sourcing and subject to revision.

Television ratings for the 2021 World Series were 20% higher than the 2020 World Series in the shortened season. It also averaged a higher rating than the NBA Finals for the second straight year. However, ratings for the 2021 World Series were still below where they had been pre-COVID. Game 6 drew a 33.5 rating and 54% share in the Atlanta market, the highest since Game 4 of the 1999 World Series. It drew a 25.6 rating and a 47% share in the Houston market.

=== Radio ===
For the 24th consecutive year, ESPN Radio aired the series in the United States, led by Dan Shulman on play-by-play with Jessica Mendoza and Eduardo Pérez as color analysts; Kevin Winter hosted the pregame coverage with analyst Chris Singleton and reporters Buster Olney and Marly Rivera, while Olney provided in-game reports and conducted postgame interviews.

This was the first World Series to be broadcast on TUDN Radio, which had acquired national rights to Spanish-language MLB radio broadcasts in early October. TUDN Radio commentators included Jose Napoles, Jesus Acosta, Alberto Ferreiro, and Luis Quiñones.

The flagship radio stations for both teams also produced local broadcasts of each game. In Atlanta, WCNN and WAOS broadcast in English and Spanish respectively, KBME (in English) and KLAT (in Spanish) aired the games in the Houston market. Outside of those stations, MLB rules dictated that team-affiliated stations carry the ESPN Radio broadcasts of the games.

== Aftermath ==
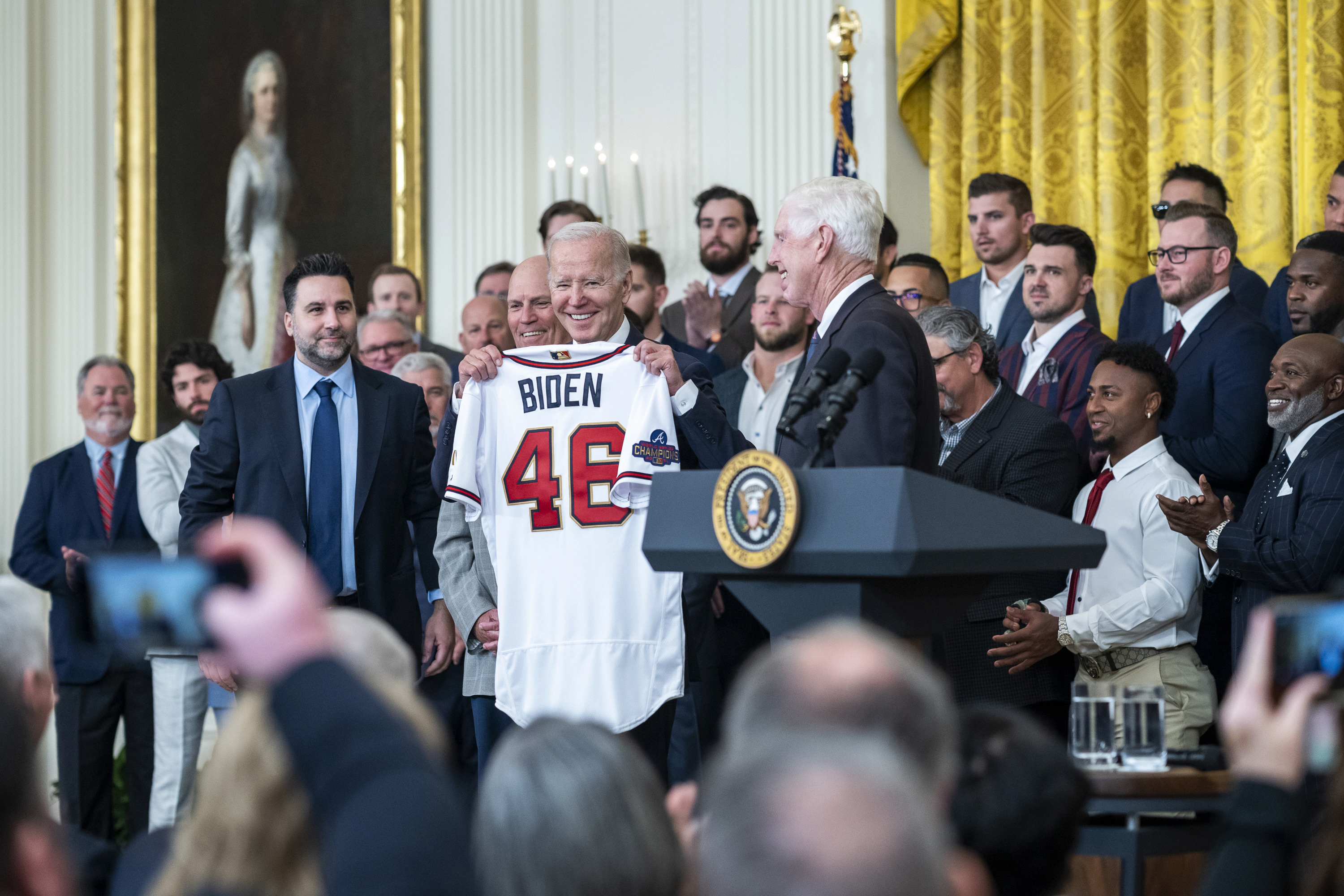
Braves with President Joe Biden in 2022.

=== Braves ===
The Braves win ended what many locals had considered the Georgia sports curse, which was highlighted by the Atlanta Falcons infamously losing Super Bowl LI to the New England Patriots after holding a 28-3 lead in 2017. Sportswriter David Waldstein of The New York Times said "no other sports city needed a triumph more than Atlanta" after they won the World Series. In January 2022, the Georgia Bulldogs ended their 41-year NCAA football title drought and repeated as champions a year later.

The Braves celebrated their championship with a parade on November 5, with a nods to Henry "Hank" Aaron, the franchise legend who died in January at the age of 86. On their parade route, the Braves stopped through Georgia State University's Center Parc Stadium complex including the landing spot of Aaron's 715th home run where Atlanta-Fulton County Stadium used to stand. Once the parade reached Cumberland and Truist Park, the crowd was addressed by Henry's widow, Billye Aaron, in tribute to the slugger. The Braves honored Hank Aaron during the 2021 season by including his jersey number 44 on the back of the team caps, along with the jersey number 35 in honor of Phil Niekro, who died one month earlier in December 2020; the Braves also had 44 design cut into their grass in center field all season. In addition, Aaron was honored in the design of the team's World Series championship ring, which included 755 total diamonds to commemorate Aaron's career home runs, and 44 emerald-cut diamonds to represent Aaron's jersey number with the Braves. When the Braves opened their 2022 season, they unveiled their World Series banner prior to the singing of "Lift Every Voice and Sing" in tribute to the victims of the coronavirus pandemic.

This was the start of three straight National League teams making the World Series with a sub-90 win total. The Phillies in 2022 and Diamondbacks in 2023 made it to the Fall Classic, but were defeated by the Astros and Rangers, respectively.

Freddie Freeman, who homered in the final two games of the 2021 World Series, would hit a home run in four consecutive games to start the 2024 World Series, breaking a record for most consecutive World Series home runs. By 2022, Freeman was on the Dodgers, after leaving Atlanta via free agency after 2021.

=== Astros ===
Following the conclusion of the season, the Astros lost five players to free agency: Carlos Correa to the Minnesota Twins, Zack Greinke to the Kansas City Royals, Marwin González to the New York Yankees, Kendall Graveman to the Chicago White Sox, and Brooks Raley to the Tampa Bay Rays. Justin Verlander was the lone free agent to re-sign with the Astros, returning on a two-year deal with a player option in the second year after missing all of the 2021 season.

On August 2, 2022, the Astros traded starter Jake Odorizzi for Braves reliever Will Smith. Smith was the pitcher who recorded the last out of the World Series, making him the first pitcher ever to be traded the following season to the opposing team that he recorded the last out against.

The Astros repeated as American League West champions in 2022, their sixth consecutive postseason appearance and fifth division title in six seasons. They swept the Seattle Mariners in the Division Series and the New York Yankees in the Championship Series to return to and win the World Series by beating the Philadelphia Phillies in six games.

=== Media ===
This was Joe Buck's last World Series, after he had called 24 World Series in 26 years (1996, 1998, 2000-2021), the longest run of any play-by-play announcer on network television calling the World Series. Buck and his NFL broadcast partner Troy Aikman signed a lucrative multi-year deal with ESPN, which saw them become the new lead broadcast team of Monday Night Football beginning in the 2022 NFL season. Fox would promote number two play-by-play baseball announcer Joe Davis to replace Buck's spot for the regular season, All-Star, and postseason games. Buck did not call another MLB game until July 29, 2024, when he called a St. Louis Cardinals home game against the Texas Rangers for Bally Sports Midwest alongside Chip Caray. Despite joining ESPN, it was not until 2025 that Buck called his first MLB game for the network, an Opening Day game between the Milwaukee Brewers and New York Yankees.

== See also ==
- 2021 Korean Series
- 2021 Japan Series
- Georgia sports related curse
