= Luis García (pitcher, born 1996) =

Venezuelan baseball player (born 1996)

New York Yankees
- Pitcher
- Born: December 13, 1996 (age 29); Bolívar, Venezuela
- Bats: Right Throws: Right

MLB debut
- September 4, 2020, for the Houston Astros

MLB statistics (through 2025 season)
- Win–loss record: 29–19
- Earned run average: 3.60
- Strikeouts: 371
- Stats at Baseball Reference

Teams
- Houston Astros (2020–2023, 2025)

Career highlights and awards
- World Series champion (2022)

Luis Heibardo García (born December 13, 1996) is a Venezuelan professional baseball pitcher in the New York Yankees organization. García signed with the Houston Astros as an international free agent in 2017, and made his Major League Baseball (MLB) debut in 2020.

== Career ==
=== Houston Astros ===
==== Minor leagues ====
Luis García signed with the Houston Astros as an international free agent on July 2, 2017. He spent the 2017–2019 seasons in Minor League Baseball with the Dominican Summer League Astros, Quad Cities River Bandits, Tri-City ValleyCats, and Fayetteville Woodpeckers.

==== Major league debut (2020) ====
García was called up to the majors for the first time on August 29, 2020. He made his major league debut on September 4, against the Los Angeles Angels.

In 2020, García had a win–loss record (W–L) of 0–1 with a 2.92 earned run average (ERA) in 12 1/3 innings pitched (IP) over the course of five games (one start). García made his postseason debut in Game 5 of the American League Championship Series (ALCS) against the Tampa Bay Rays. He pitched two scoreless innings in a bullpen game that the Astros went on to win.

==== Rookie season (2021) ====
García played his first full major league season for the Astros in 2021. He appeared in 30 games, starting 28, and registered 155 1/3 innings pitched. He posted an 11–8 win–loss record with a 3.48 ERA, and 167 strikeouts, ranking third on the club in innings pitched and second in strikeouts. García led AL rookie pitchers in Wins Above Replacement (WAR, 3.1), wins, strikeouts, and innings pitched. His strikeout total trailed only Tom Griffin in 1969 with 200 for most among rookies in franchise history. García was the eighth Astros rookie pitcher with at least eleven wins. Following the regular season, the Houston chapter of the Baseball Writers' Association of America (BBWAA) named García as the Astros' Rookie of the Year. He finished second to Randy Arozarena of Tampa Bay in the American League Rookie of the Year balloting, receiving two first-place votes. García was also awarded with a selection to that year's Topps All-Star Rookie team.

In the postseason, García struggled initially, losing both of his first two starts (Game 3 of the ALDS and Game 2 of the ALCS) while failing to get past the third inning in each. However, he adjusted his mechanics and started Game 6 on October 22 which resulted in a gem; in 5 2/3 innings, he struck out seven with one walk and one hit while helping to shut out the Boston Red Sox. The lone hit was yielded to the final batter, Kike Hernandez. Thus, García tied the club record for the longest number of innings pitched without allowing a hit in postseason history, equaling Brandon Backe's performance in the 2004 NLDS. Garcia's start was also the second-longest no-hit bid by a rookie (after Michael Wacha in 2013) and the most by an AL rookie pitcher. That night, the Astros prevailed 5–0 to defeat the Red Sox and win the American League pennant.

Garcia started Game 3 of the World Series. He went 3 2/3 innings while allowing one run on three hits, four walks, and six strikeouts in a 2–0 loss to the Atlanta Braves; he is the fifth pitcher to have that many strikeouts with one earned run allowed in four innings or less and first since Rich Hill.

==== 2022 ====
On May 6, 2022, García matched a career-high with nine strikeouts versus the Detroit Tigers, going seven innings, allowing two hits, one earned run, and earning the win in a 3–2 final score. He retired the final 15 batters faced and, at one point, five consecutive via strikeout. On May 29, García retired the first 13 Seattle Mariners batters until a walk to Eugenio Suárez and did not allow the first hit until Luis Torrens singled leading off the sixth inning as the Astros eventually won, 2–1.

On June 15, García authored an immaculate inning in the second inning versus the Texas Rangers at Globe Life Field, striking out Nathaniel Lowe, Ezequiel Durán, and Brad Miller. Five innings later, teammate Phil Maton struck out the same trio of batters en route to his own immaculate inning, making this the first occasion in the major leagues of two immaculate innings pitched both in the same game and on the same date. García's immaculate inning was the eighth in team history. On June 30, he led a 2–1 win over the New York Yankees with one run allowed over 5 1/2 innings, three hits and six strikeouts.

On July 12, García allowed one hit in six scoreless innings to the Los Angeles Angels, retiring the final 13 batters while striking out seven. The one hit allowed was a career low through his first 45 major league starts. His sixth quality start of the season, it was the 17th consecutive produced on the road by Houston pitching. Per an AT&T SportsNet broadcast, that extended the longest streak in franchise history, exceeding the 1972 club (14). In a September 3 start versus Los Angeles, García tossed seven innings and allowed one run as Houston fell 2–1 in extra innings. On September 19, García started the first five innings and won a 4–0 shutout of the Tampa Bay Rays to clinch a fifth American League West division title for the Astros over the previous six seasons. In his final start of the regular season on October 2, García was the winning pitcher with one run allowed over six innings versus Tampa Bay, culminating a 7–0 record and 3.20 ERA over his last eight starts. His seven wins from August 12 onward led the AL.

During the 2022 regular season, García was 15-8 with a 3.72 ERA in 28 starts covering 157 1/3 innings.

In the third game of the 2022 ALDS, García earned the win after working the final five innings of a series-clinching sweep of the Mariners. The game had remained scoreless for an unprecedented 17 innings until rookie Jeremy Peña homered in the top of the 18th to eventually win it for the Astros, 1–0, in the longest shutout in postseason history. The Astros advanced to the World Series and defeated the Philadelphia Phillies in six games to give García his first career World Series title.

==== 2023 ====
García began the 2023 season in Houston's rotation, making 6 starts and registering a 2–2 record and 4.00 ERA with 31 strikeouts in 27 innings pitched. In a May 1 outing against the San Francisco Giants, García departed with right elbow discomfort after only eight pitches. On May 5, it was announced that García would require Tommy John surgery, ending his 2023 season.

==== 2024–2025 ====
García did not play for Houston in 2024, making two rehabilitation appearances for the rookie-level Florida Complex League Astros and Double-A Corpus Christi Hooks.

On January 9, 2025, García and the Astros agreed to a $1.875 million contract for the season, avoiding arbitration. On January 25, it was announced that García would likely not be ready for Opening Day. He was transferred to the 60-day injured list on April 7. García was activated from the injured list on September 1. He made two starts for Houston, where he logged a 1-0 record and 3.52 ERA with seven strikeouts across 7 2/3 innings pitched. On September 10, García was placed on the injured list due to right elbow discomfort. He was transferred to the 60-day injured list two days later, officially ending his season. On September 24, manager Joe Espada announced that García would miss the entirety of the 2026 due to an unspecified elbow surgery. He elected free agency on November 6, after being removed from the 40-man roster.

=== New York Yankees ===
On March 27, 2026, García signed a two-year minor league contract with the New York Yankees. On March 27, he was placed on the full-season injured list ruling him out for the entire 2026 season.

== International career ==
García played for Team Venezuela in the 2023 World Baseball Classic (WBC). He made his WBC debut during Venezuela's opening game of the tournament and in Pool D play, pitching three innings versus the Dominican Republic. He became the first pitcher to strike out at least seven batters in one relief outing in WBC play, also earning a hold as Venezuela won, 5–1.

== See also ==
- Houston Astros award winners and league leaders
- List of baseball players who underwent Tommy John surgery
- List of Major League Baseball pitchers who have thrown an immaculate inning
- List of Major League Baseball players from Venezuela
- List of World Series starting pitchers
