= Scott Braun =

American sports studio host and reporter

- Born: Warren Township, New Jersey, U.S.
- Education: University of Miami
- Notable credit: MLB Network
- Title: Former MLB Network Host; Play-by-play announcer; Podcast host

Scott Braun is an American sports broadcaster. He is the executive producer and host of the Foul Territory podcast. He was previously a studio host and reporter for MLB Network and NHL Network.

== Early life and education ==
Braun was raised in Warren Township, New Jersey and graduated from Watchung Hills Regional High School in 2007.

Braun graduated from the University of Miami with a double major in broadcast journalism and sports administration.

== Career ==
As a college student, Braun appeared on ESPNU as a Campus Connection reporter and hosted multiple shows for University of Miami TV, which led to play-by-play college basketball work and online hosting for ESPN.com.

Braun served as a college basketball play-by-play announcer for ESPN and the host of ESPN.com's Heat Index, covering the Miami Heat prior to joining the MLB Network in 2012 and NHL Network in 2015. In addition to his work for ESPN, Braun reported feature stories around the country for CBS Sports Network and was a studio host on CBSSports.com, including Fantasy Football Today.

Braun was the play-by-play voice for the Chatham Anglers of the Cape Cod Baseball League in 2009 and 2010 and served as the Cape League Insider on SiriusXM MLB Network Radio.

On MLB Network, Braun appeared on shows including the Emmy Award-winning MLB Tonight, MLB Now, The Rundown, High Heat, Quick Pitch and Plays of the Week. On NHL Network, he appeared on NHL Tonight, NHL Now and On The Fly. In addition to his studio work, Braun is a play-by-play announcer for MLB Network and MLB.com game telecasts including the World Baseball Classic and JUCO World Series. In 2018, Braun was the primary play-by-play man for MLB's live Facebook games.

Braun also serves as an occasional play-by-play broadcaster for Pac-12 Network and SNY, including New York Mets games, and a host on sports talk radio shows on SiriusXM.

Braun served as play-by-play for the world feed for the 2021 World Series produced by MLB International, airing in over 200 countries around the world, as well as on the American Forces Network. He worked alongside Dan Plesac, who provided color commentary. In 2022, Braun served as the main play-by-play announcer for the weekly MLB Game of the Week Live on YouTube.

In 2023, it was announced that Braun would no longer be working for the MLB Network or the NHL Network. He announced a role as the Executive Producer and Host for the Foul Territory podcast.
