= Dan Plesac =

American baseball player and analyst (born 1962)

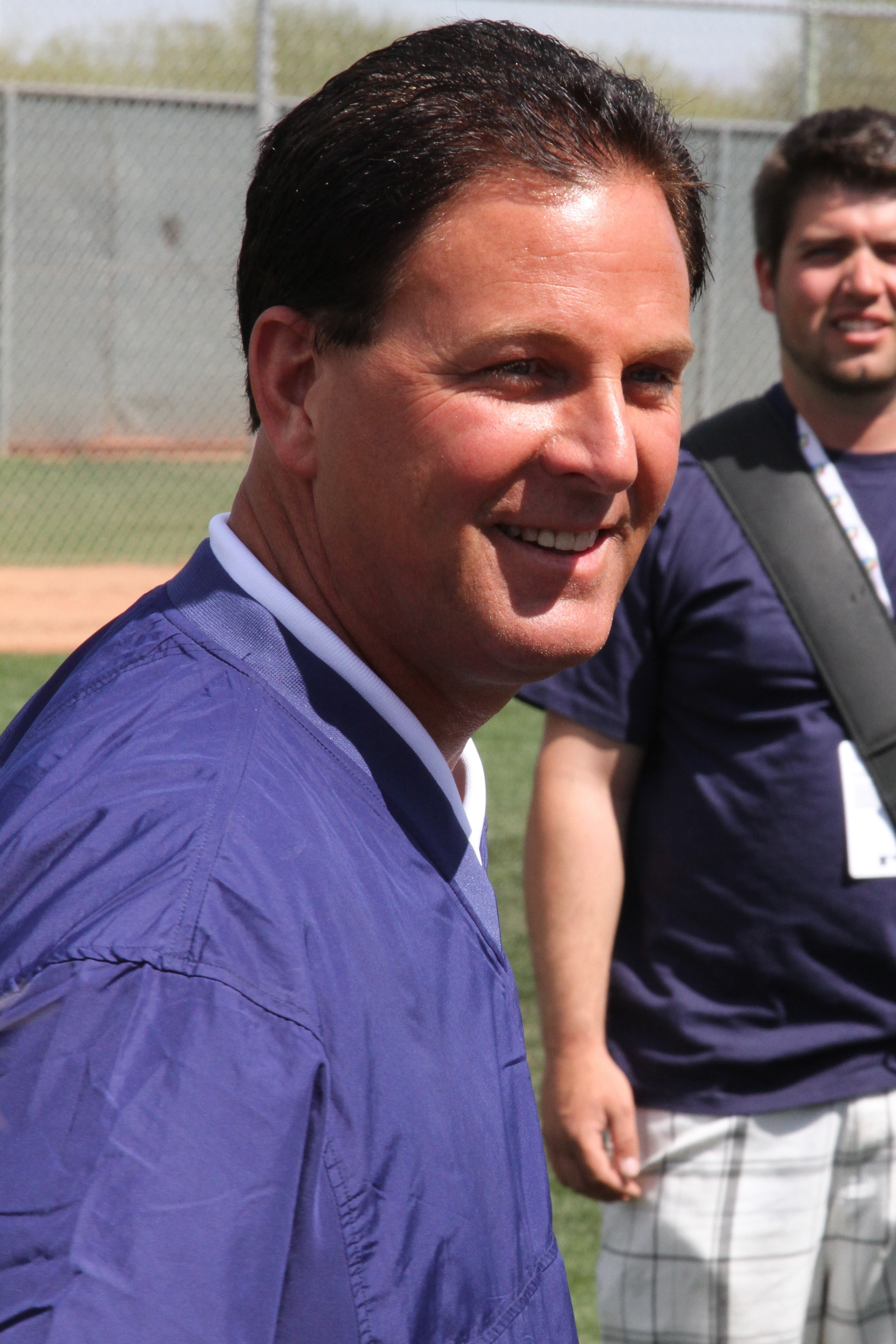
- Plesac in 2012
- Pitcher
- Born: February 4, 1962 (age 64); Gary, Indiana, U.S.
- Batted: Left Threw: Left

MLB debut
- April 11, 1986, for the Milwaukee Brewers

Last MLB appearance
- September 28, 2003, for the Philadelphia Phillies

MLB statistics
- Games pitched: 1,064
- Win–loss record: 65–71
- Earned run average: 3.64
- Strikeouts: 1,041
- Saves: 158
- Stats at Baseball Reference

Teams
- Milwaukee Brewers (1986–1992); Chicago Cubs (1993–1994); Pittsburgh Pirates (1995–1996); Toronto Blue Jays (1997–1999); Arizona Diamondbacks (1999–2000); Toronto Blue Jays (2001–2002); Philadelphia Phillies (2002–2003)

Career highlights and awards
- 3× All-Star (1987–1989); Milwaukee Brewers Wall of Honor

Daniel Thomas Plesac (born February 4, 1962) is an American former Major League Baseball pitcher who played from 1986 to 2003. He pitched for the Milwaukee Brewers, Toronto Blue Jays, Chicago Cubs, Pittsburgh Pirates, Arizona Diamondbacks, and Philadelphia Phillies.

== Early life ==
Plesac attended Crown Point High School in Crown Point, Indiana, where he excelled in baseball, basketball, football, and track.

Plesac played college baseball for the NC State Wolfpack in the early 1980s. Plesac was inducted to the North Carolina State Baseball Hall of Fame in 2010.

== Major Leagues ==
A hard thrower with a mid-90 mph fastball and great slider, Plesac was originally a starting pitcher before becoming the closer of the Milwaukee Brewers. Plesac served primarily as a left-handed specialist from the mid-1990s until the end of his career, pitching for the Blue Jays twice, the Diamondbacks, and the Phillies.

He was elected to the American League All-Star team three times (1987, 1988 and 1989) and ended his career with a 65–71 record, a 3.64 ERA in 1,064 games and 1,072 innings pitched. In 1988, Plesac recorded three saves against the Twins in a weekend series immediately preceding the 1988 All Star Game in Cincinnati. Due to travel complications, he flew to Cincinnati on the Reds team chartered plane.

Plesac holds numerous all-time Brewers pitching records (minimum 500 innings pitched). He is the franchise's career leader in games, saves and ERA. He is second in K/9 and WHIP (BB + H/IP), in both cases to Ben Sheets, and is fifth in K/BB ratio.

He was the last Phillies pitcher to pitch at Veterans Stadium. He struck out the only batter he faced, Ryan Langerhans, to record the third out in the top of the ninth inning on September 28, 2003, as the Phillies lost to the Atlanta Braves, 5–2.

In his 18-year career, Plesac was never on the disabled list, never having surgery in or off season. He pitched in 1,064 games, the most for any pitcher who never reached a World Series (in general, he appeared in the postseason just once in 1999).

== Television career ==
Plesac worked as a news telecaster for Comcast Sportsnet Chicago, co-hosting as a pregame and postgame highlighter for Chicago Cubs from 2005 until the end of the 2008 season. Plesac joined the MLB Network and became an analyst since its January 1, 2009, launch. He appears on MLB Tonight and is an occasional guest host for Intentional Talk. He also served as a broadcaster for the MLB: The Show video game franchise. Plesac served as color commentator for the world feed of the 2021 World Series and 2022 All-Star Game produced by MLB International, airing in over 200 countries as well as on the American Forces Network. During the 2021 World Series, he worked alongside Scott Braun, who provided play-by-play, while for the 2022 All Star Game, he worked with Jason Benetti. In May 2025, he began to fill in for Steve Stone as a color commentator with play by play voice John Schriffen on Chicago Sports Network for select White Sox road games.

== Personal life ==
An avid horse racing fan, Plesac became a horse trainer after retirement and once saved an old horse he previously owned after learning it was left in poor condition. He has two nephews who have played in Major League Baseball, Zach Plesac and Blaze Alexander.
