= MLB International =

International telecasts of Major League Baseball

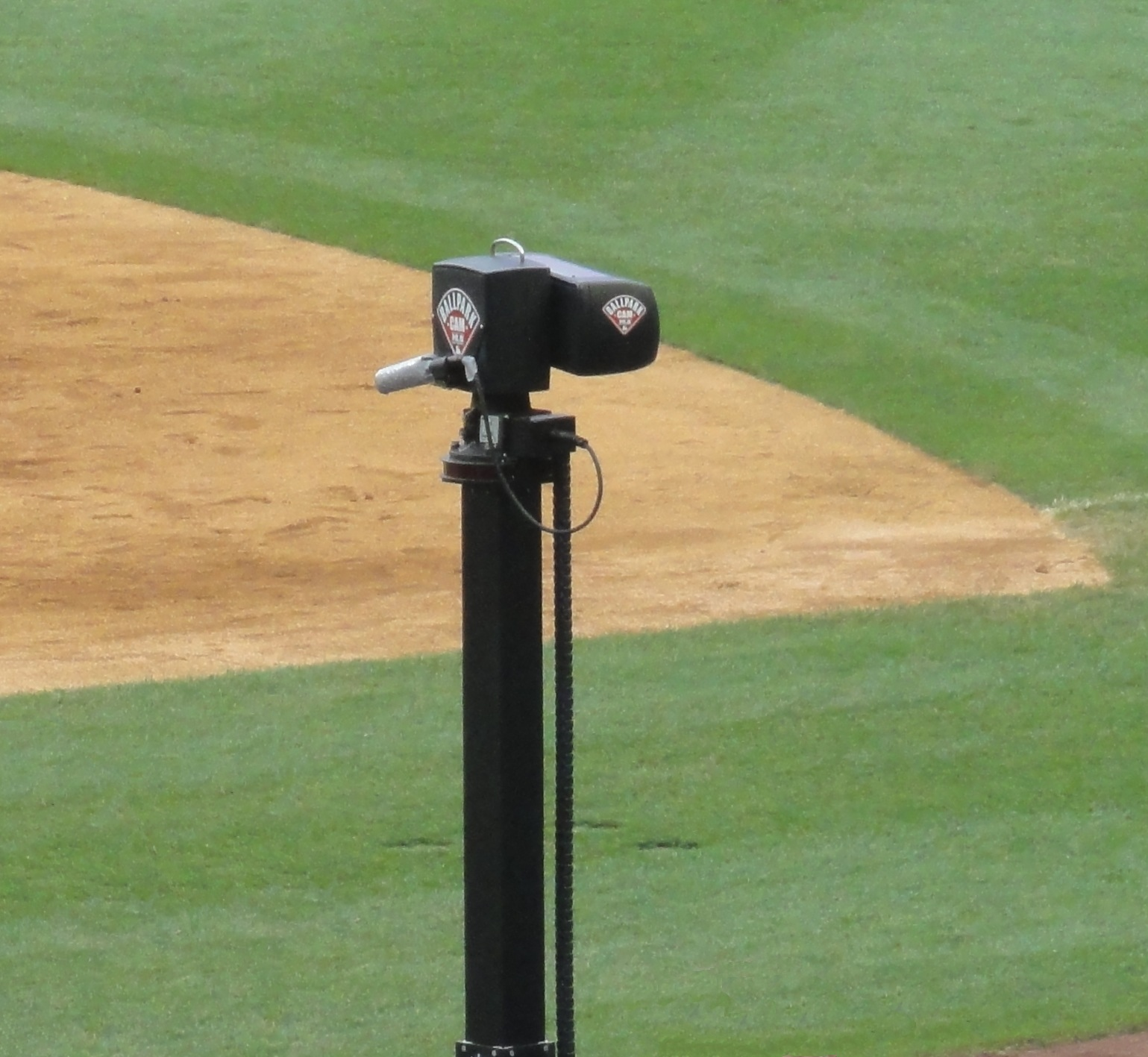
- Also known as: Major League Baseball International; MLBi
- Genre: Sports broadcast
- Based on: MLB Network
- Narrated by: Gary Thorne; Dave O'Brien; Matt Vasgersian; Dan Shulman; Scott Braun; Jason Benetti; Dave Flemming
- Opening theme: Major League Baseball International theme (1996–2014); MLB Network Showcase theme (2015–present)
- Country of origin: United States
- Original language: English

Production
- Production locations: World Series MLB stadiums (game telecasts)

Original release
- Network: Fox Sports; MLB Network; Spike TV
- Release: 1996 – present

MLB International is a division of Major League Baseball primarily responsible for international broadcasts of games. In partnership with DirecTV and MLB Network, it produces and syndicates the All-Star Game, and the World Series, as well as the Caribbean Series, the Australian Baseball League Championship Series and the World Baseball Classic to broadcasters in over 200 countries, and the American Forces Network for U.S. military troops abroad. It previously broadcast the NLCS and ALCS, alternating between the two each year. MLB International broadcasts content that shows baseball in a local context, e.g. sneaker shopping in Japan or baseball games in India, and explains concepts and rules of baseball to viewers who may not be familiar with the sport.

== Commentators ==
From 1996 until 2003 and again starting in 2010, Gary Thorne served as the play-by-play man for the World Series on Armed Forces Radio and MLB International.

Dave O'Brien provided commentary for MLB International's coverage of the World Series from 2004 until 2009. O'Brien teamed with his usual ESPN partner Rick Sutcliffe on broadcasts of the World Series and the American League Championship Series for MLB International.

From 1996 to 2002, and 2010–2014, MLB International broadcast the League Championship Series alternately, with the American League Championship Series in even-numbered years and the National League Championship Series in odd-numbered years. Since 2015, production of the MLB International broadcasts has been assumed by the MLB Network. Matt Vasgersian (formerly of ESPN Sunday Night Baseball and today part of Fox Sports) in addition to the MLB Network, also current play-by-play television announcer for the Los Angeles Angels (AL) and former play-by-play television announcer for the San Diego Padres (NL) has served as the play-by-play commentator; for the 2016 World Series onward, he was joined by Buck Martinez (play-by-play analyst of the Toronto Blue Jays for Sportsnet—which has carried the world feeds due to his involvement, and former color commentator for TBS) on color. Since 2018, with Matt now with ESPN part-time in addition to his MLB Network duties, Buck was joined for the All-Star Game duties by former Sunday Night Baseball voice Dan Shulman (who calls play-by-play on selected Blue Jays games on Sportsnet with Martinez on color).

In 2021, MLB Network's Scott Braun assumed the post as the main play-by-play announcer for MLB International's broadcasts. He was replaced in 2022 by Jason Benetti (NBC Sports Chicago) for the English-language international MLB All-Star Game coverage and Dave Flemming (NBC Sports Bay Area, KNBR) for the global World Series coverage. Vasgersian returned to the international service as the lead PBP man for the 2025 ASG.

=== Commentator pairings ===
- Gary Thorne and Ken Singleton (All-Star Game, League Championship Series and the World Series, 1996–2003)
- Dave O'Brien and Rick Sutcliffe (All-Star Game, ALCS and the World Series, 2004–2009)
- Gary Thorne and Rick Sutcliffe (All-Star Game, League Championship Series and the World Series, 2010–2014)
- Matt Vasgersian and John Smoltz (All-Star Game and the World Series, 2015)
- Matt Vasgersian and Mark DeRosa (All-Star Game only, 2016)
- Matt Vasgersian and Buck Martinez (All-Star Game, 2017, World Series, 2016–2020)
- Paul Severino and Joe Magrane (World Baseball Classic Pool A only, 2017)
- Rich Waltz and Buck Martinez (World Baseball Classic Pools B and E only, 2017)
- Matt Vasgersian, John Smoltz, and Jon Morosi (World Baseball Classic Pools C, D and F, round robin, semifinal and championship games only, 2017)
- Dan Shulman and Buck Martinez (All-Star Game only, 2018–2019)
- Scott Braun and Cliff Floyd (All-Star Game only, 2021)
- Scott Braun and Dan Plesac (World Series, 2021)
- Jason Benetti and Dan Plesac (All-Star Game only, 2022)
- Dave Flemming and Dan Plesac (World Series, 2022)
- Dave Flemming and Buck Martinez (All-Star Game only, 2023)
- Dave Flemming and Ryan Spilborghs (World Series, 2023–present)
- Stephen Nelson and José Mota (World Baseball Classic Pools B only 2023 and C only 2026)
- Matt Vasgersian and Yonder Alonso (All-Star Game only, 2024–present)

== MLB International broadcasters ==
- Worldwide (U.S. military bases only): American Forces Network
- Australasia: ESPN Australia
- Canada, excluding Blue Jays games: Sportsnet (English), TVA Sports (French)
- Caribbean: ESPN Caribbean
- Europe: beIN Sports France (France), ESPN Netherlands (Netherlands), Movistar Deportes (Spain), TNT Sports 4 (UK and Ireland), BBC Sport (UK), Arena Sport (Balkans), DAZN (Austria, Germany, Liechtenstein, Luxembourg, Switzerland), Sport TV (Hungary), Sky Sport (Italy, San Marino, Vatican City), Viaplay (Nordics)
- Japan: NHK, J Sports
- India: Star Sports, Fancode
- South Korea: SPOTV
- Latin America: ESPN Latin America, ESPN Brazil (Brazil), Fox Sports (Mexico), RPC-TV, TV Max (Panama), Imagen Televisión (Mexico), Meridiano Televisión (Venezuela), Telecaribe (Colombia)
- Dominican Republic: Tele Antillas and Coral 39
- Puerto Rico: WAPA-TV
- Curaçao: Telecuraçao
- Middle East and North Africa: beIN Sports Middle East
- Africa: ESPN Africa
- Taiwan: CTS, ELTA TV, Videoland
- Southeast Asia: SPOTV (World Baseball Classic, 2023, major MLB events starting in 2024 season)
- United States: During Game 1 of the 2015 World Series, due to a power outage that affected a studio truck producing Fox's domestic coverage of the game, Fox temporarily switched to the MLB International feed of the game in order to restore coverage. The broadcast temporarily used the MLB International commentary, but was later overdubbed with Fox's broadcast team (led by Joe Buck) before the standard Fox Sports production was restored. MLB International is the designed backup feed in the event that FOX or TBS is unable to carry its own feed due to technical difficulties during the LCS or World Series.

== See also ==
- Major League Baseball International broadcasting
- List of sports television broadcast contracts
