= 1130 AM =

AM radio frequency

The following radio stations broadcast on AM frequency 1130 kHz: 1130 AM is a clear-channel frequency shared by Canada and The United States. KWKH Shreveport and WBBR New York City share Class A status of 1130 AM.

== In Argentina ==
- LRA21 in Santiago del Estero
- Show in Buenos Aires

== In Canada ==
Stations in bold are clear-channel stations.

Call sign	City of license	Daytime power (kW)	Nighttime power (kW)	Transmitter coordinates
CBSI-23	Port-Menier, Quebec	0.04	0.04	49.8208°N 64.3475°W

== In Mexico ==
- XECSEC-AM In San Miguel Allende, Guanajuato
- XECHAP-AM in Texcoco, State of Mexico
- XEFN-AM in Uruapan, Michoacán
- XEHN-AM in Nogales, Sonora

== In the United States ==
Stations in bold are clear-channel stations.

Call sign	City of license	Facility ID	Class	Daytime power (kW)	Nighttime power (kW)	Critical hours power (kW)	Transmitter coordinates
KAAB	Batesville, Arkansas	39607	D	1	0.02		35.744444°N 91.639167°W
KBMR	Bismarck, North Dakota	2207	D	10	0.024		46.810278°N 100.736111°W
KILJ	Mount Pleasant, Iowa	34605	D	0.25	0.022		40.960556°N 91.584722°W
KLEY	Wellington, Kansas	31895	D	0.25	0.001		37.241111°N 97.401111°W
KPHI	Honolulu, Hawaii	88995	B	1	1		21.438333°N 157.991389°W
KQNA	Prescott Valley, Arizona	53415	D	1	0.004		34.629444°N 112.315556°W
KQRR	Mount Angel, Oregon	160794	B	25	0.49		45.076389°N 122.8075°W
KRDU	Dinuba, California	54559	B	5	6.2		36.484167°N 119.265833°W
KSDO	San Diego, California	51166	B	10	10		32.851111°N 116.964167°W
KTLK	Minneapolis, Minnesota	59961	B	50	25		44.646667°N 93.391944°W
KTMR	Converse, Texas	28191	D	25			29.319444°N 97.976389°W
**KWKH**	Shreveport, Louisiana	60266	A	50	50		32.705°N 93.881944°W
WALQ	Carrville, Alabama	68309	D	25		1	32.454722°N 85.9325°W
**WBBR**	New York, New York	5869	A	50	50		40.810833°N 74.04°W
WBZB	Murray, Kentucky	73270	D	1.5			36.635556°N 88.319444°W
WCLW	Eden, North Carolina	48701	D	1			36.5225°N 79.765278°W
WDFN	Detroit, Michigan	59969	B	50	10		42.110833°N 83.197778°W
WEAF	Camden, South Carolina	24146	D	5	0.007		34.258889°N 80.579722°W
WEDI	Eaton, Ohio	71930	D	0.25			39.748611°N 84.583889°W
WFNB	Brazil, Indiana	19669	D	0.5	0.02		39.512222°N 87.138333°W
WHHW	Hilton Head Island, South Carolina	48366	B	1	0.5		32.200278°N 80.724167°W
WISN	Milwaukee, Wisconsin	65695	B	50	10		42.755°N 88.081389°W
WLBA	Gainesville, Georgia	8606	D	10		1	34.279167°N 83.775833°W
WOIZ	Guayanilla, Puerto Rico	54483	B	0.2	0.7		18.0175°N 66.772778°W
WPYB	Benson, North Carolina	4774	D	6.5		1	35.360833°N 78.569167°W
WQFX	Gulfport, Mississippi	61306	D	1			30.389167°N 89.106389°W
WRRL	Rainelle, West Virginia	54411	D	1			37.957778°N 80.7625°W
WWBF	Bartow, Florida	66926	B	2.5	0.5		27.908611°N 81.825833°W
WYXE	Gallatin, Tennessee	3424	D	2.3		0.94	36.410556°N 86.454444°W

== In Uruguay ==
- CX 30 Radio Nacional in Montevideo
