= CX30 =

CX30 or CX-30 may refer to:

- Changan CX30, a Chinese compact car
- Connexin 30, abbreviated as CX30
- CX 30 Radio Nacional, an Uruguayan radio station
- Mazda CX-30, a Japanese subcompact crossover
