= WEAF =

WEAF may refer to:

- WEAF (AM), a radio station (1130 AM) in Camden, South Carolina
- WPTI, a radio station (94.5 FM) in Eden, North Carolina, which held the WEAF call sign from 1968 to 1980
- WQHT, a radio station (97.1 FM) in New York City which was WEAF-FM from 1944 to 1946.
- WFAN (AM), a radio station (660 AM) in New York City which held the WEAF call sign from 1922 to 1946
- West of England Aerospace Forum
- Writers Emergency Assistance Fund
- Wisconsin Equity Association in Funding
