= WSBI =

WSBI may refer to:

- World Savings Banks Institute
- WSBI (AM), a radio station (1210 AM) licensed to Static, Tennessee, United States
