= WXEM =

Radio station in Buford–Atlanta, Georgia

- Buford, Georgia; United States
- Broadcast area: Atlanta metropolitan area
- Frequency: 1460 kHz
- Branding: La Mejor

Programming
- Format: Regional Mexican music

Ownership
- Owner: La Favorita, Inc.
- Sister stations: WAOS, WLBA

History
- First air date: December 12, 1957
- Former call signs: WDMF (1956–1964); WDYX (1964–1986); WJYA (1986–1990); WLKQ (1990–1991)

Technical information
- Licensing authority: FCC
- Facility ID: 36158
- Class: B
- Power: 5,000 watts days 193 watts nights
- Transmitter coordinates: 34°7′15.00″N 83°58′35.00″W

Links
- Public license information: Public file; LMS
- Website: La Mejor Atlanta Website

WXEM (1460 kHz "La Mejor") is a commercial AM radio station licensed to Buford, Georgia, and serving the Atlanta metropolitan area. The station is owned by La Favorita, Inc., and airs a Regional Mexican music format. It simulcasts with two other Atlanta-area stations owned by La Favorita, AM 1600 WAOS in Austell and AM 1130 WLBA in Gainesville.

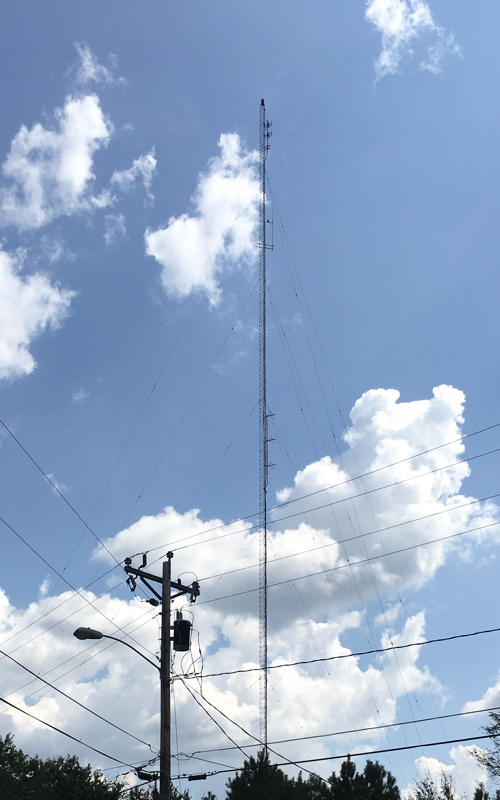
The single broadcasting antenna tower used by WXEM and WLKQ-FM as seen from the northwest in Buford, Georgia.

WXEM is powered at 5,000 watts by day. But at night, to avoid interfering with other stations on AM 1460, WXEM dramatically drops its power to 193 watts. It uses a non-directional antenna at all times. The transmitter is on Radio Park Drive, near Interstate 985 in Buford. WXEM is considered a Class B station by the Federal Communications Commission.

The station began broadcasting on December 12, 1957.
