= WMRB =

- Columbia, Tennessee; United States
- Frequency: 910 kHz
- Branding: Radio Vida 1130

Programming
- Format: Spanish Christian

Ownership
- Owner: Rev. Jose Rodriguez; (Iglesia Hispana de Nashville, Inc.)
- Sister stations: WSBI, WYXE

History
- First air date: September 21, 1982

Technical information
- Licensing authority: FCC
- Facility ID: 3405
- Class: D
- Power: 500 watts day 101 watts night
- Transmitter coordinates: 35°36′24.00″N 87°1′30.00″W

Links
- Public license information: Public file; LMS
- Website: radiovida1130.com

WMRB (910 AM, "Radio Vida") is a radio station broadcasting a Spanish Christian format. Licensed to Columbia, Tennessee, United States, the station is currently owned by Rev. Jose Rodriguez, through licensee Iglesia Hispana de Nashville, Inc., and broadcast programming via satellite from Sister Station WYXE in Gallatin, Tennessee.

== History ==
The Station signed on September 21, 1982 under the ownership of Ogilvie Family Ministries, and would broadcast a Religious Format until 2005, when the Station would flip to broadcasting programming from Fox Sports Radio branded as "910 The Duck".

Ogilvie Family Ministries would sell WMRB to Iglesia Hispana de Nashville on March 14, 2014, who would then change the format to Spanish Christian a day after on March 15.
