= WAOS =

- Austell, Georgia; United States
- Broadcast area: Atlanta metropolitan area
- Frequency: 1600 kHz (analog)
- Branding: La Mejor

Programming
- Language: Spanish
- Format: Regional Mexican music

Ownership
- Owner: La Favorita, Inc.
- Sister stations: WXEM, WLBA

History
- First air date: April 16, 1968
- Former call signs: WACX (1968–1983); WCKZ (1983–1986)

Technical information
- Licensing authority: FCC
- Class: D
- Power: 20,000 watts daytime 67 watts nighttime
- Transmitter coordinates: 33.809859°N 84.657002°W
- Repeater: 1130 AM (WLBA Gainesville); 1460 AM (WXEM Buford)

Links
- Public license information: Public file; LMS
- Website: La Mejor Atlanta Website

WAOS (1600 kHz "La Mejor") is a Spanish language commercial, AM radio radio station licensed to Austell, Georgia, and serving the Atlanta radio market. The station airs a Regional Mexican radio format. Programming is also simulcast on 1130 AM WLBA in Gainesville and on 1460 AM WXEM in Buford. The stations are owned by La Favorita, Inc.

WAOS is considered a Class D AM station by the Federal Communications Commission. By day, it is powered at 20,000 watts. But to protect other stations on AM 1600, it greatly reduces power at night to 67 watts. It uses a non-directional antenna located on Westside Road in Austell, near C. H. James Parkway (U.S. Route 278).

WLBA is also a Class D station, and is a daytimer. It uses a non-directional antenna powered at 10,000 watts by day, 1,000 watts during critical hours but must sign off the air at night to protect other stations on AM 1130, a clear channel frequency. WLBA's transmitter is off Gaines Mill Road in Gainesville.

WAOS began broadcasting on April 16, 1968. WLBA first signed on the air on January 26, 1957.
