= Changan Eado =

Chinese compact car

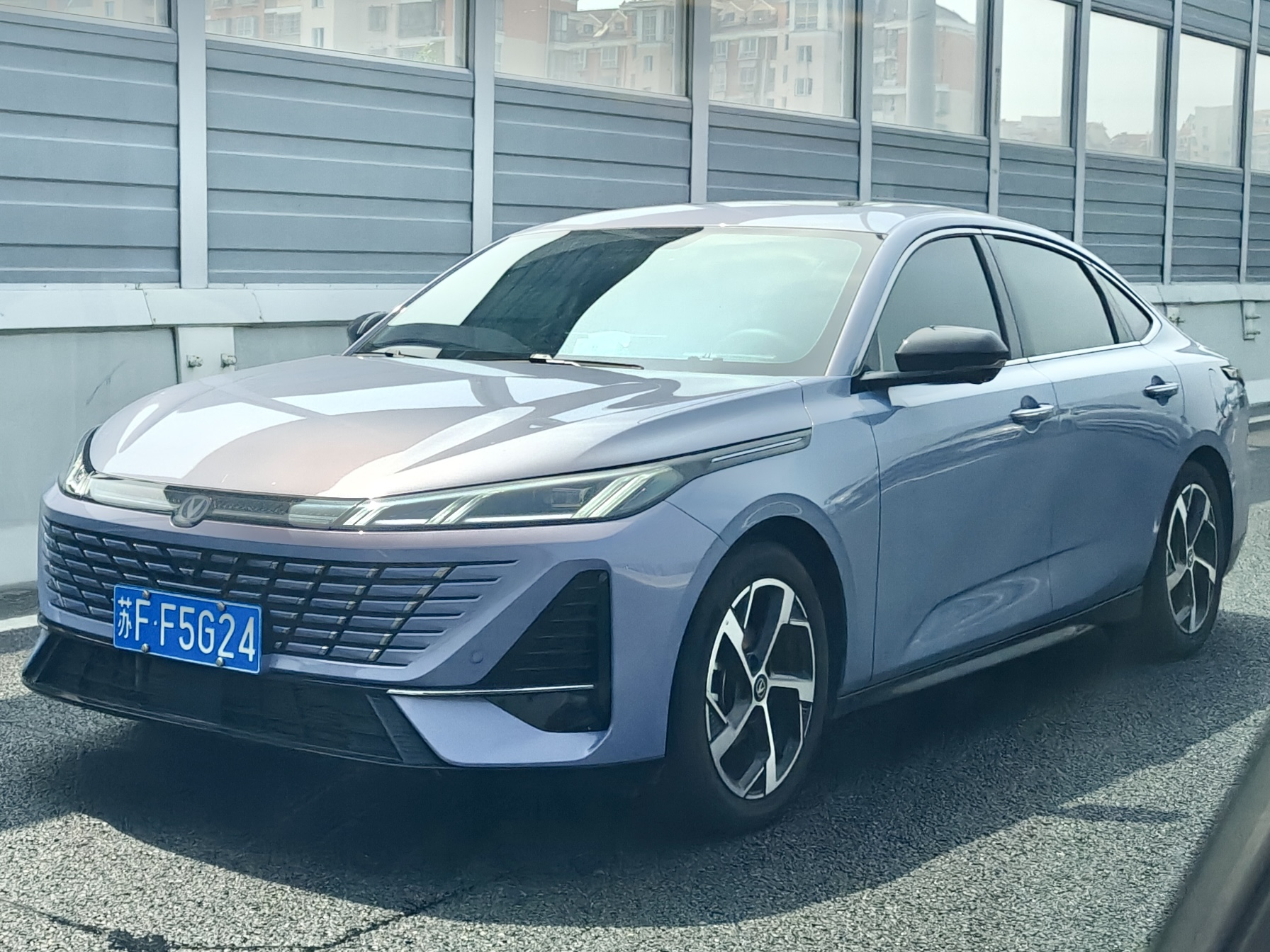

Overview
- Manufacturer: Changan Automobile
- Also called: Changan Eado XT; Changan Eado Plus
- Production: 2012–present

Body and chassis
- Class: Compact car
- Body style: 4-door sedan; 5-door hatchback

Chronology
- Predecessor: Changan CX30

The Changan Eado (逸动) is a compact car produced by Chinese auto manufacturer Changan.

The first generation was introduced in 2012 with the DT hatchback added in 2013 and the electric variant added in 2014. A performance DT RS hatchback was also offered.

The second generation model was launched as both a sedan and the DT hatchback in 2018 and the spawned electric variant launched in 2019 with a facelift revealed in 2019 for the 2020 model year, with the sedan being the only model facelifted while the hatchback was discontinued due to low sales.

The third generation is a renamed Changan Lamore introduced in March 2024.

== First generation（2012–2018） ==
Changan Eado I
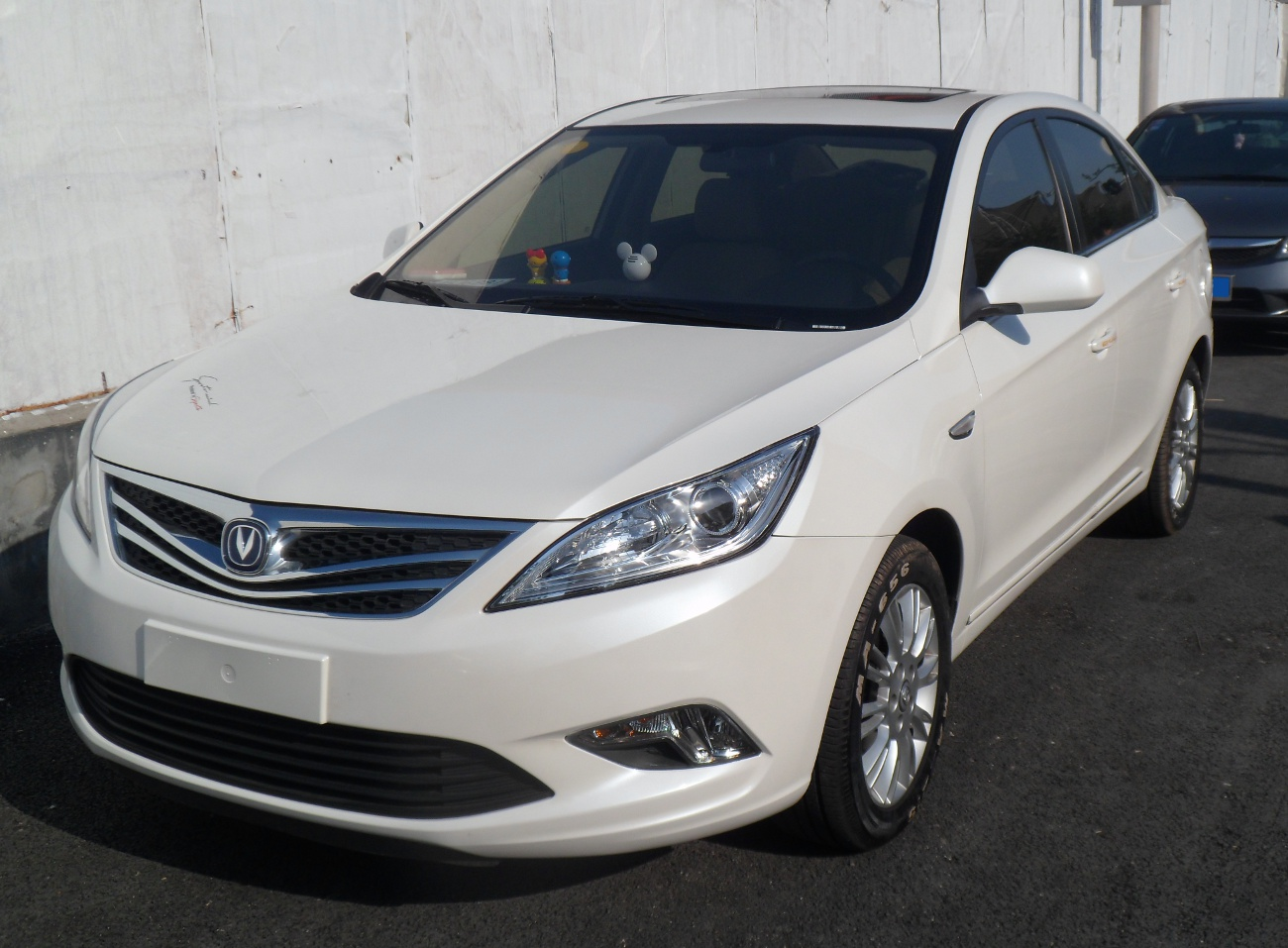

Overview
- Manufacturer: Changan
- Production: 2012–2016; 2013–2017 (XT); 2014–2018 (Hybrid/EV)
- Model years: 2013–2016; 2013–2016 (XT); 2014–2018 (Hybrid/EV)

Body and chassis
- Class: Compact car/Small family car (C)
- Body style: 5-door hatchback(XT); 4-door sedan
- Layout: Front-engine, front-wheel-drive

Powertrain
- Engine: 1.0 L JL372ZQ1 I3 (turbo petrol) (PHEV); 1.5 L JL476ZQCA I4 (turbo petrol); 1.6 L JL478QEA I4 (petrol)
- Transmission: 5-speed manual 7 speed DCT; 6-speed automatic 4-speed automatic

Dimensions
- Wheelbase: 2,660 mm (104.7 in)
- Length: 4,620 mm (181.9 in) (sedan); 4,425 mm (174.2 in) (hatchback)
- Width: 1,820 mm (71.7 in); 1,815 mm (71.5 in) (hatchback)
- Height: 1,490 mm (58.7 in) (sedan); 1,485 mm (58.5 in) (hatchback)

Chronology
- Predecessor: Changan CX30
- Successor: Changan Eado (Second Generation)

The first generation Changan Eado started sales since 2012. The vehicle was styled by Changan's Italian design center in Turin and debuted as concept car C201 at the Beijing Auto Show 2010, the production car was shown at the International Motor Show 2011 in Frankfurt am Main. The delivery of the sedan started on March 27, 2012. The later Changan CS35 crossover is also based on the Eado.

The drivetrain is powered by a 1.6-liter gasoline engine with an output of 122 hp (91 kW; 124 PS). In addition to a 5-speed manual transmission, a 4-speed automatic transmission is also available.

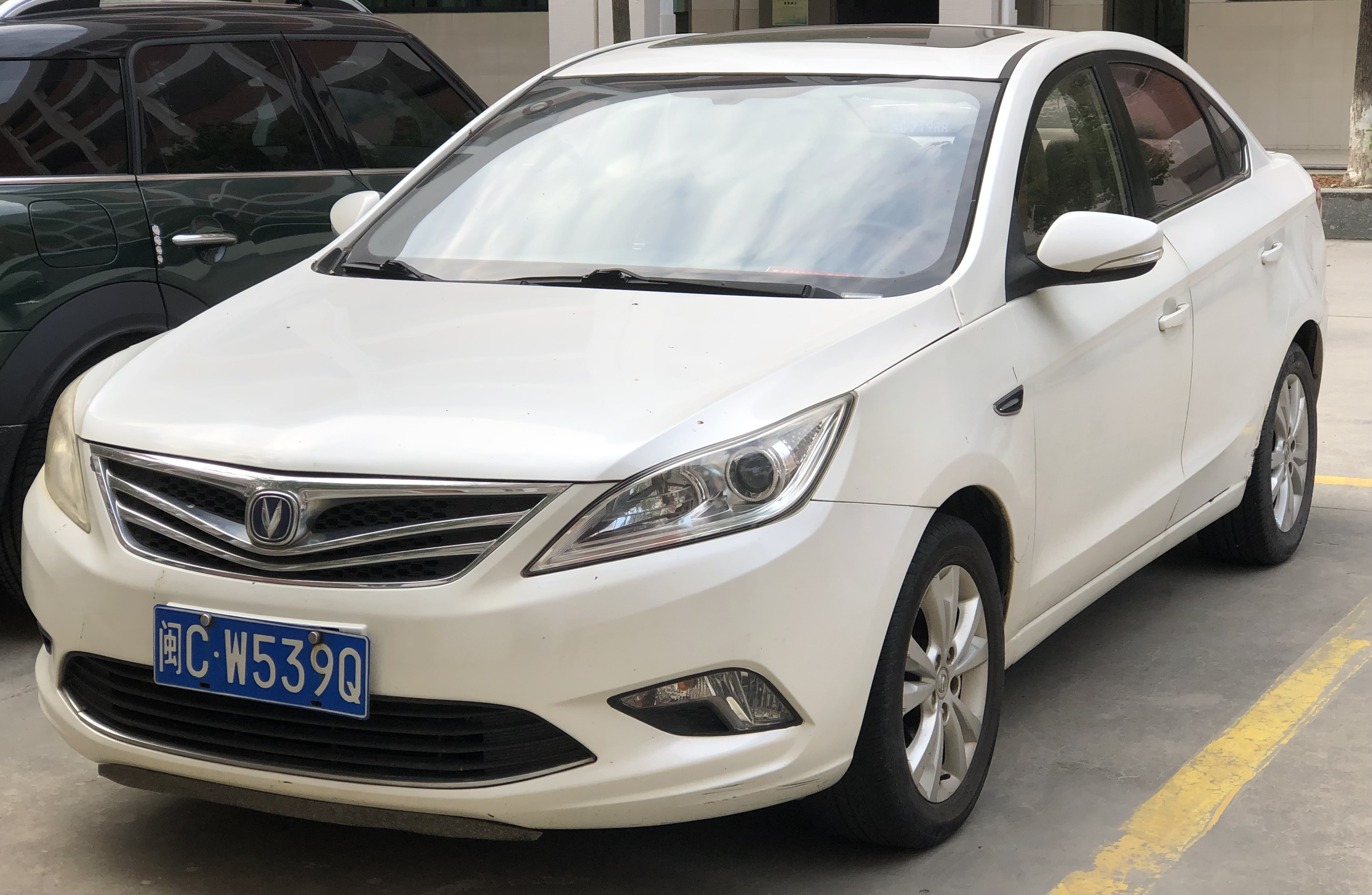
The front view of the Changan Eado.

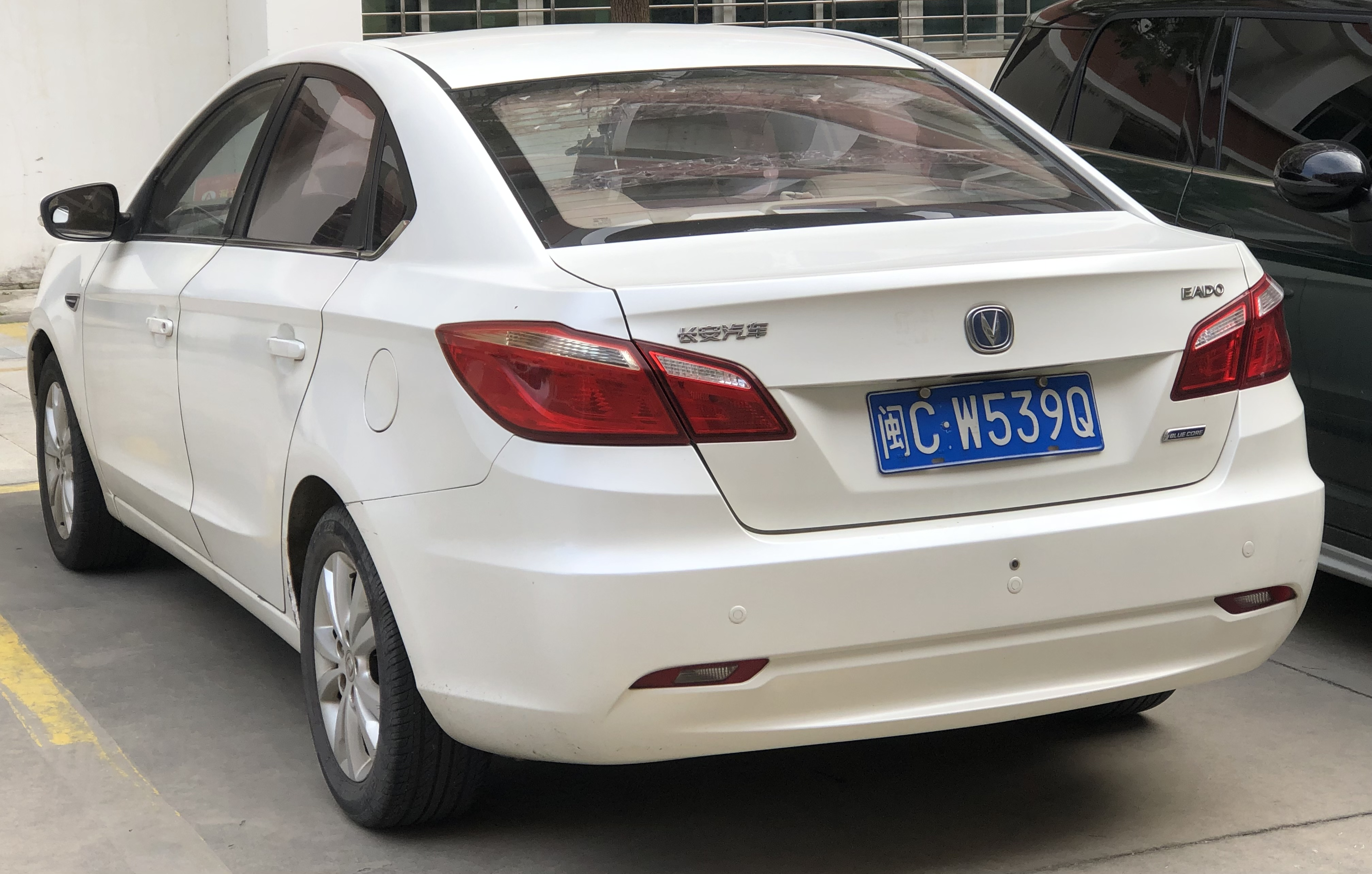
The rear view of the Changan Eado.

=== Eado XT/Eado XT RS ===
At the Shanghai Auto Show 2013 was presented with the Eado XT as a hatchback variant. This came on 28 August 2013 in the trade. The Eado XT hatchback is based on the Changan Eado sedan that was launched in March last year. A performance version with a turbo of the Eado XT was launched later in the market called the Eado XT RS.

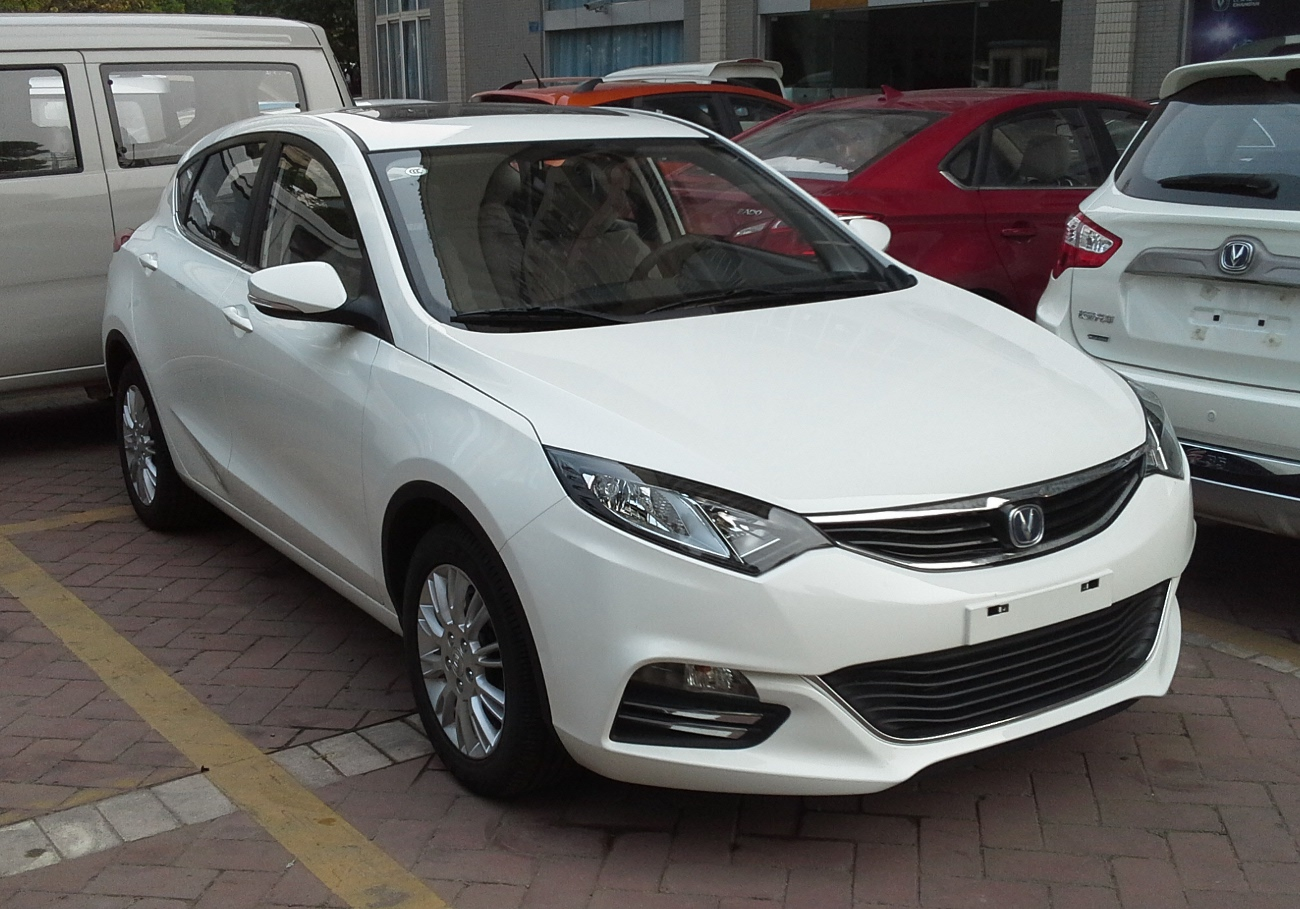
The front view of the Changan Eado XT.

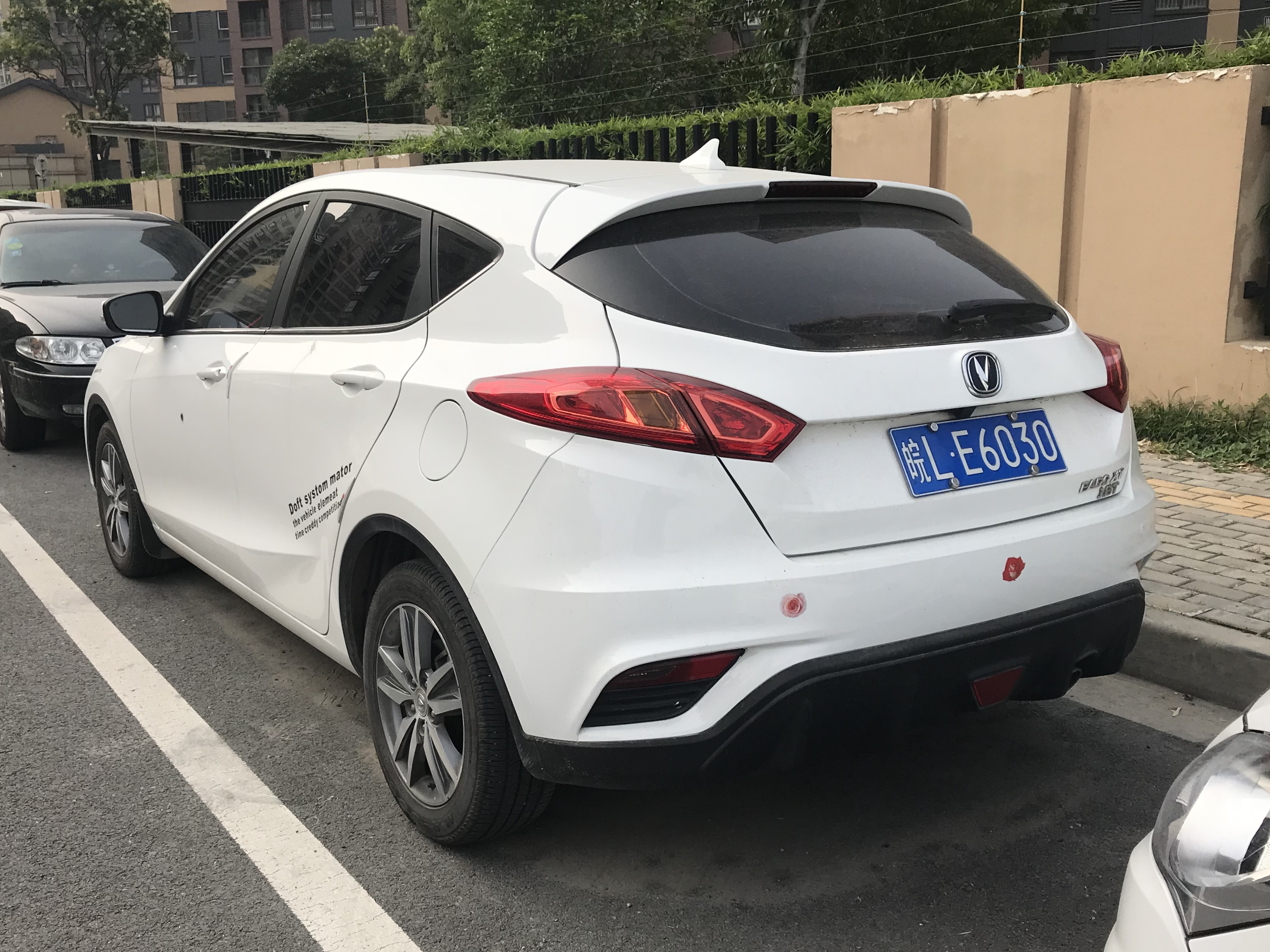
The rear view of the Changan Eado XT.

=== Eado Blue and PHEV ===
The Eado Blue is a mid hybrid version, the engine is a 1.6 liter four cylinder with a 48V electric engine.

The Eado PHEV is a plug-in hybrid version of the Eado sedan launched in october 2017. The powertrain was based on the gasoline 1.0 liter (JL372ZQ1) three-cylinder turbo with 177 hp (132 kW; 179 PS). Transmission is a 7-speed DCT and the battery have a capacity of 12.3 kWh.

=== Eado EV300 ===
Changan Eado EV is a full electric version of the Changan Eado sedan with a 26 kWh lithium-ion battery. Curb weight is 1,610 kg (3,550 lb). Range is 160 km (99 mi) and top speed is 140 km/h (87 mph). The Changan Eado EV debuted on the 2014 Beijing Auto Show in April featuring a blue painted grille to differentiate from the regular Eado. Power comes from an electric motor with 120 hp (89 kW; 122 PS).

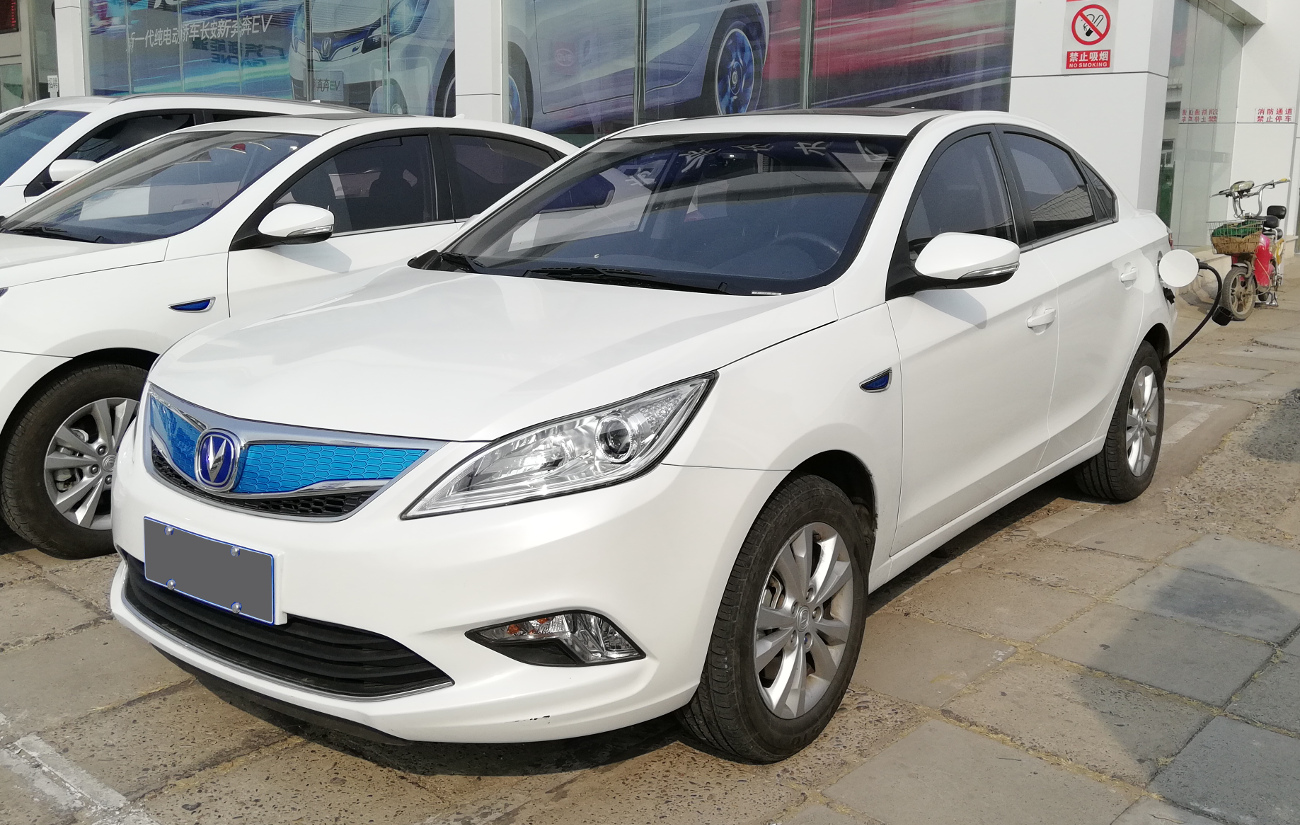
The front view of the Changan Eado EV.

== Second generation (2018–present) ==
Changan Eado II
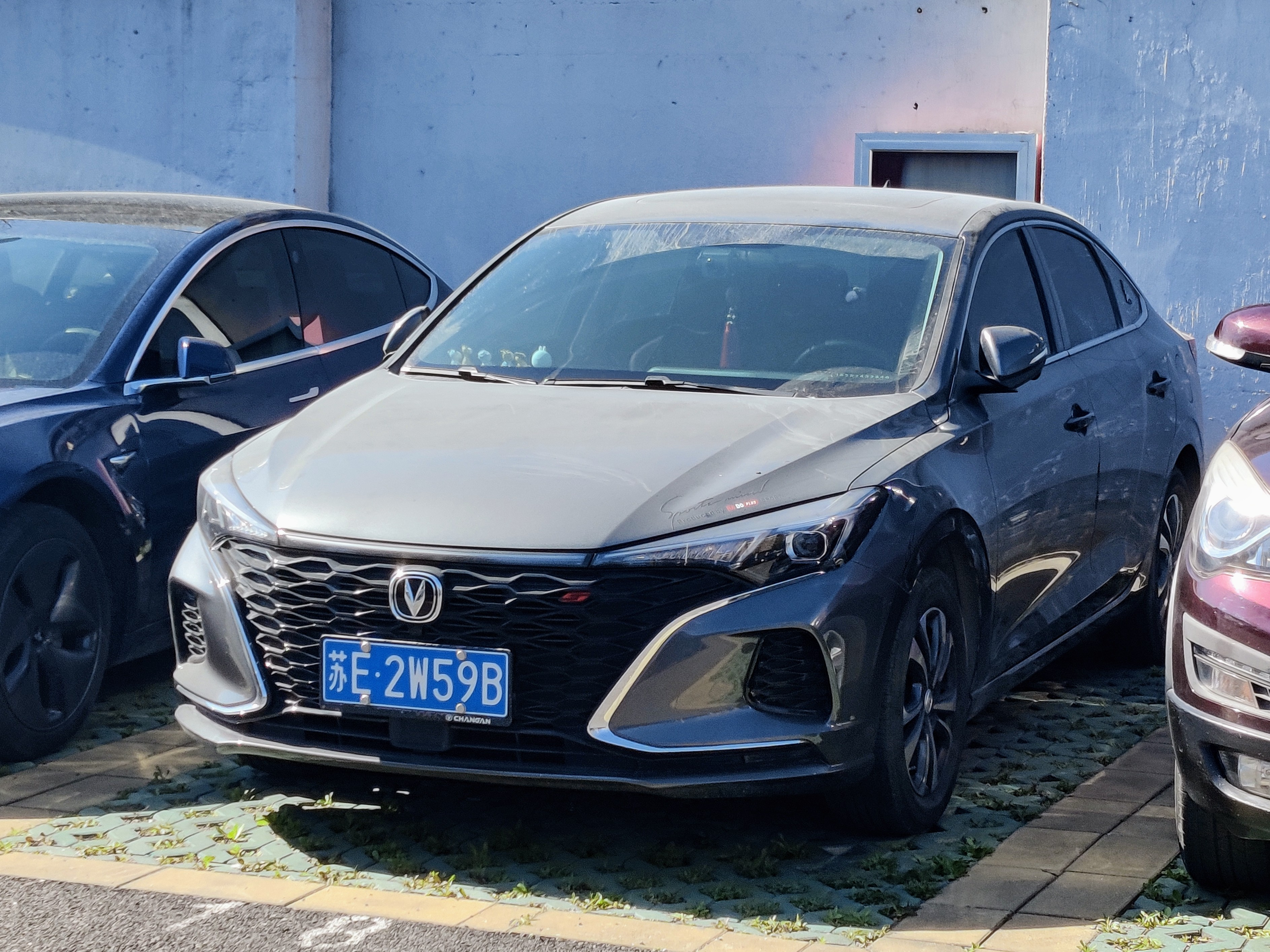

Overview
- Manufacturer: Changan
- Production: 2018–present (Eado/Eado Plus); 2018–2020 (Eado XT II)

Body and chassis
- Class: Compact car (C)
- Body style: 5-door hatchback (XT); 4-door sedan
- Layout: Front-engine, front-wheel-drive

Powertrain
- Engine: 1.0 L JL372ZQ1 I3 (turbo petrol); 1.4 L JL476ZQCE I4 (turbo petrol); 1.5 L JL476ZQCE I4 (turbo petrol); 1.6 L JL478QEN I4 (petrol)
- Transmission: 5-speed manual 7-speed DCT; 6-speed automatic

Dimensions
- Wheelbase: 2,700 mm (106.3 in)
- Length: 4,710 mm (185.4 in) (sedan); 4,505 mm (177.4 in) (XT)
- Width: 1,820 mm (71.7 in)
- Height: 1,505 mm (59.3 in)

Chronology
- Predecessor: Changan Eado (First Generation)

Details of the second generation Changan Eado sedan and second generation Changan Eado XT were released in January 2018. Price of the Eado XT II ranges from 72,000 yuan to around 97,000 yuan. Engines available are a 125 hp (93 kW; 127 PS) 1.6-litre with a five-speed manual or six-speed automatic, and a 170 hp (127 kW; 172 PS) 1.5-litre turbo with a 7-speed dual-clutch transmission.

Changan Eado II sedan

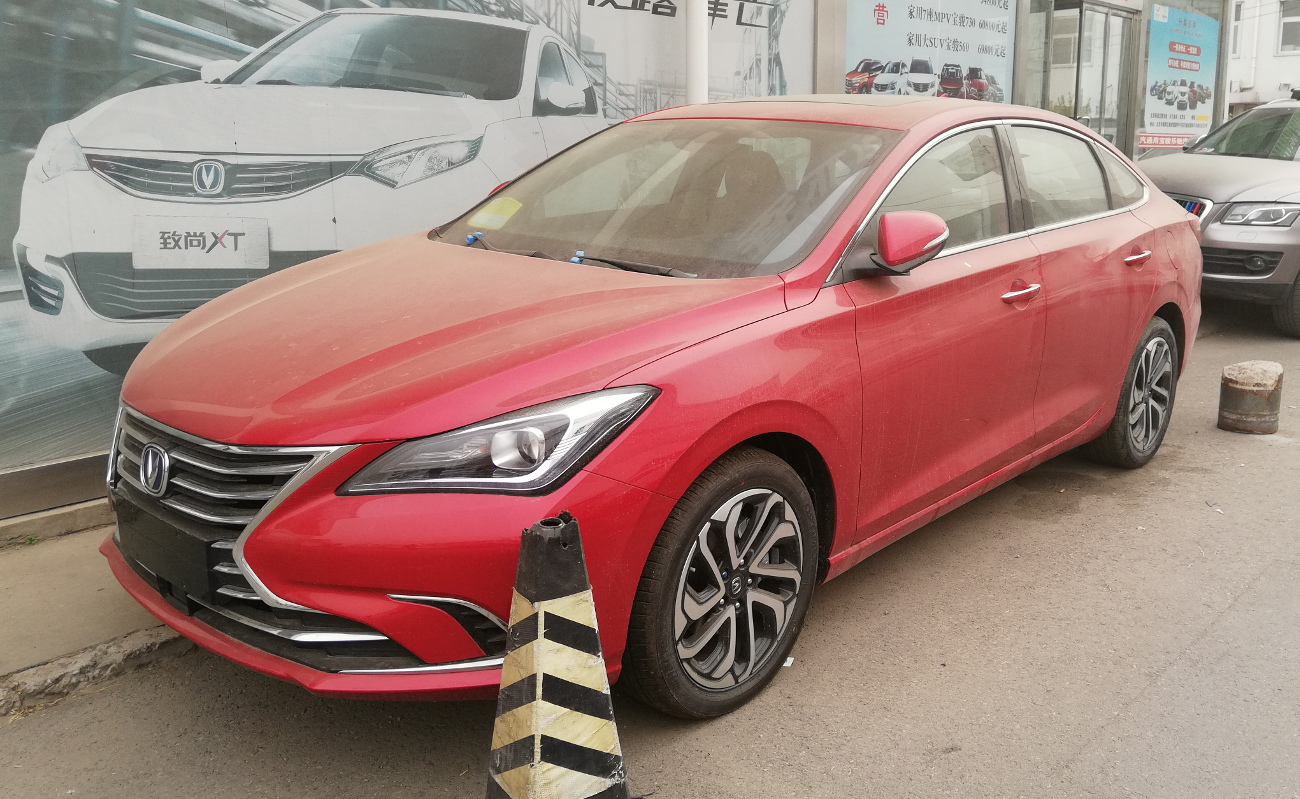
The front quarter view of the Changan Eado II.

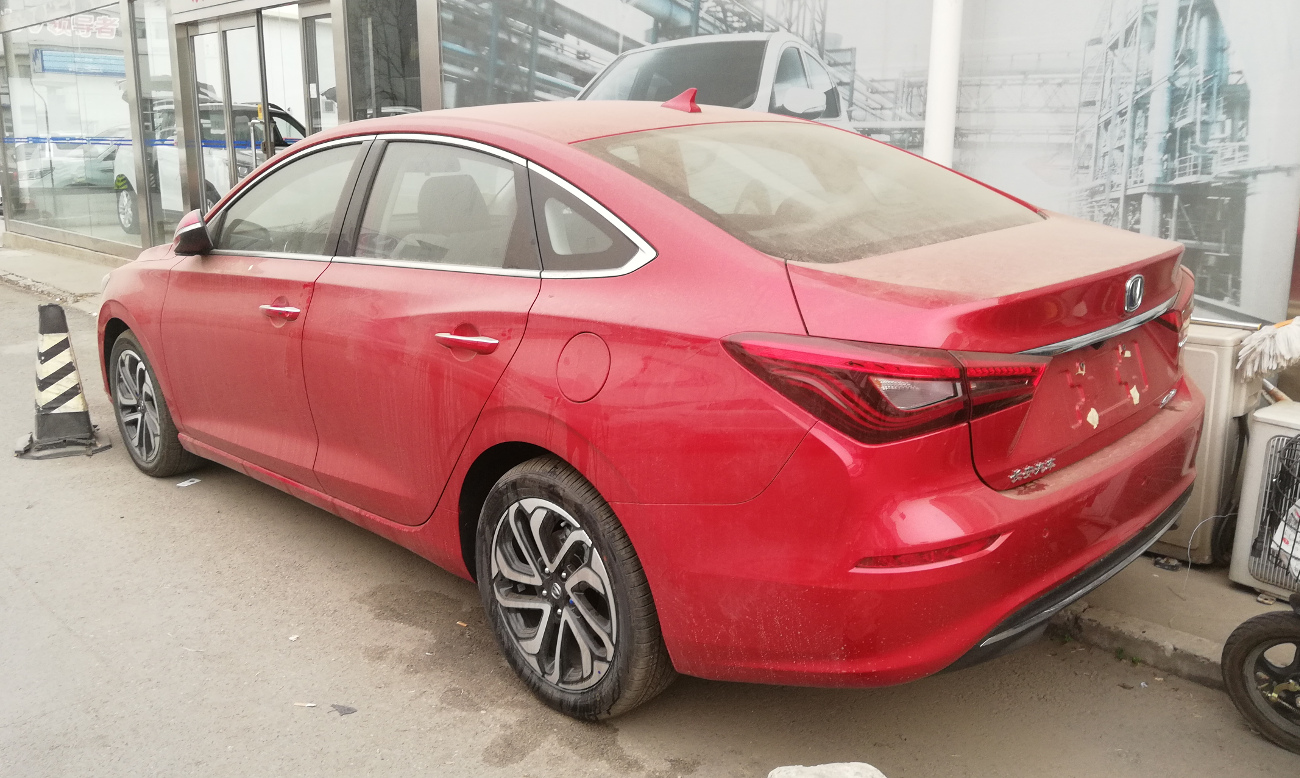
The rear view of the Changan Eado II.
Changan Eado XT II

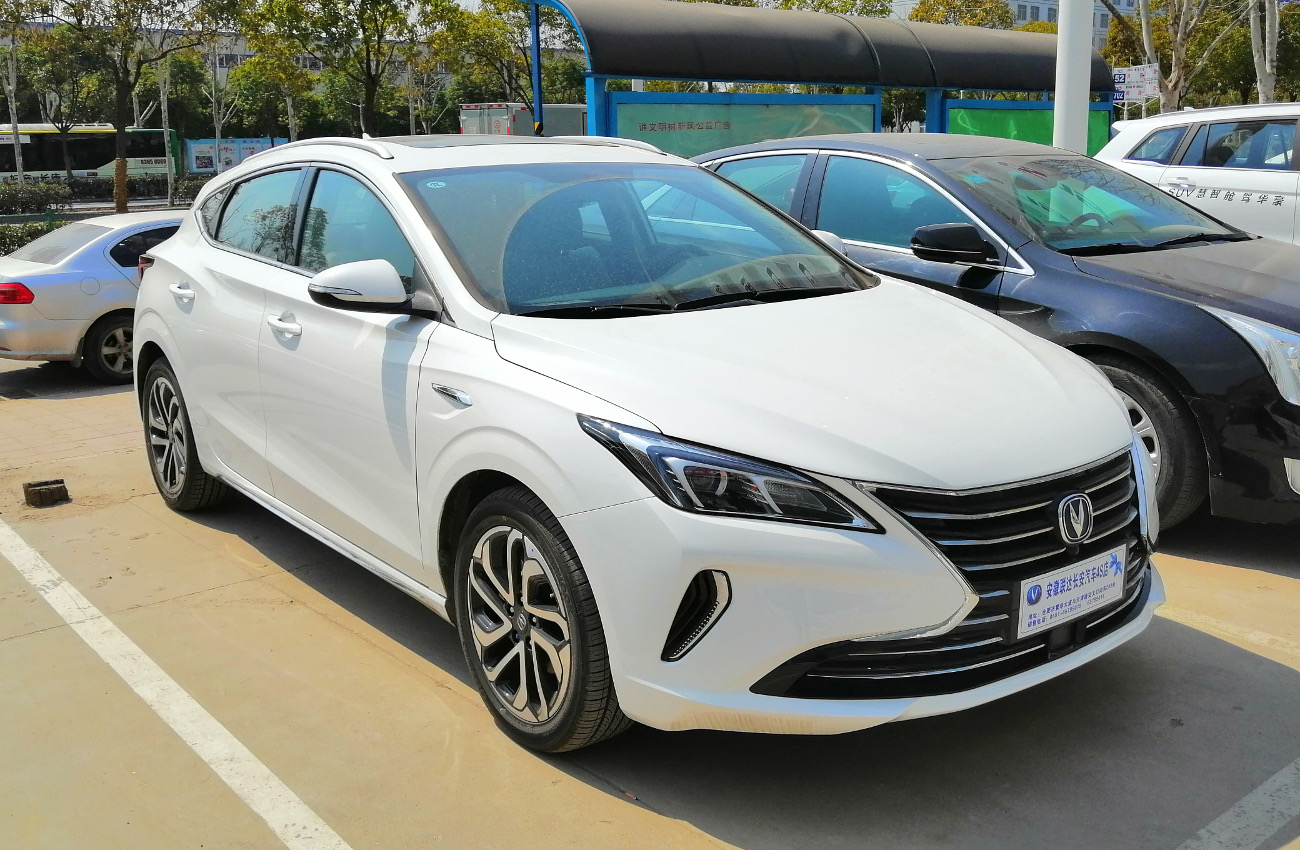
The front view of the Changan Eado XT II

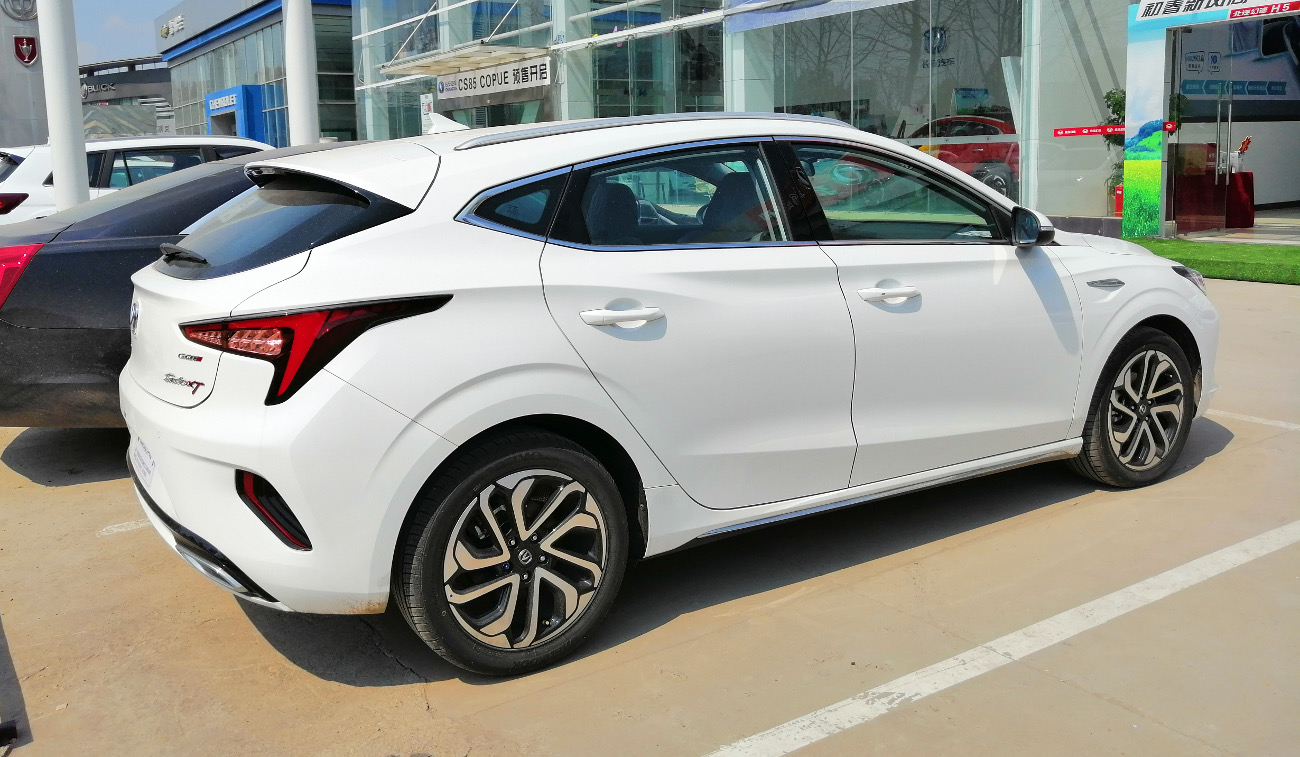
The rear view of the Changan Eado XT II

=== Eado EV ===
The Changan Eado EV or Eado EV300 is the electric variant of the second generation Eado sedan. The Changan Eado EV is powered by an electric motor producing 100 kW (134 hp; 136 PS), and is capable of a driving range of 405 kilometres (252 mi) with a full battery. Prices of the Changan Eado EV in China ranges from 129,900 yuan to 139,900 yuan ($18.320 - $19.730).

==== Eado EV460 ====
In 2018 the EV460 went on sale for a price of RMB 203,400 before subsidies. It offered an improved range over the EV300 of 550 km (342 mi) and fast charging capability. A batch of 100 EV460 with a battery swap modification went into service as taxis in Chongqing in 2021. The battery swap can be completed within 20 seconds.

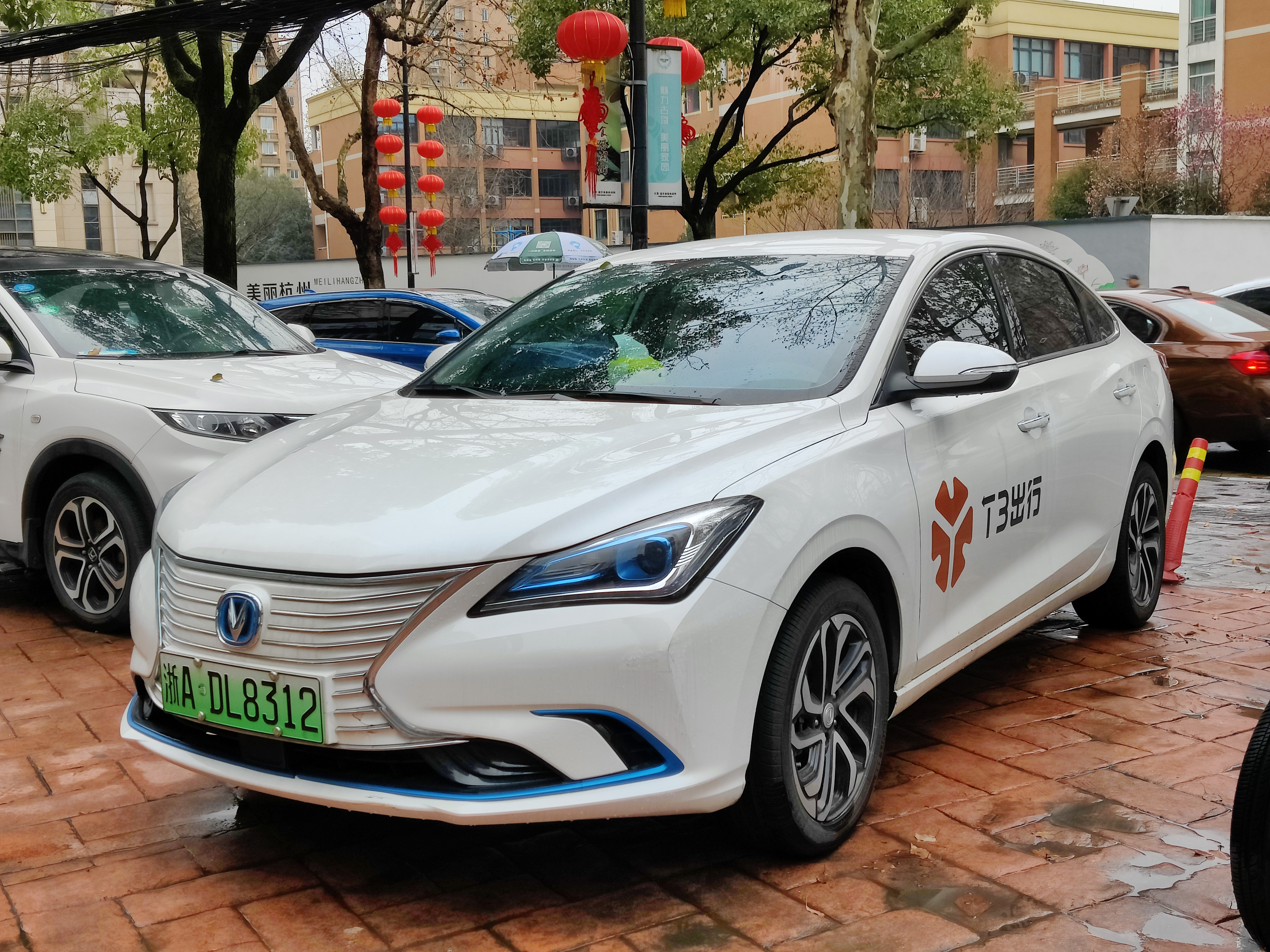
The front view of the Changan Eado EV II

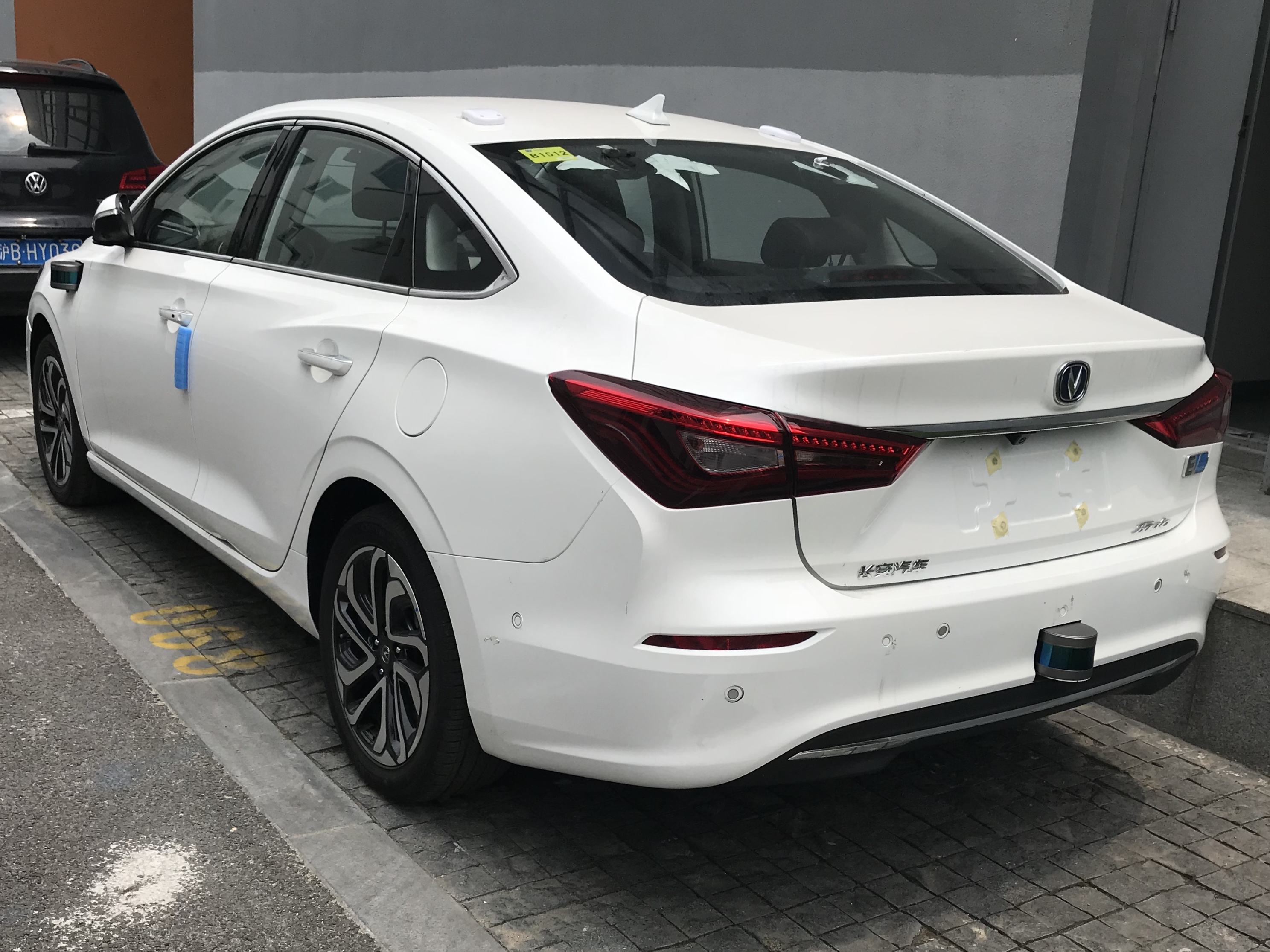
The rear view of the Changan Eado EV II
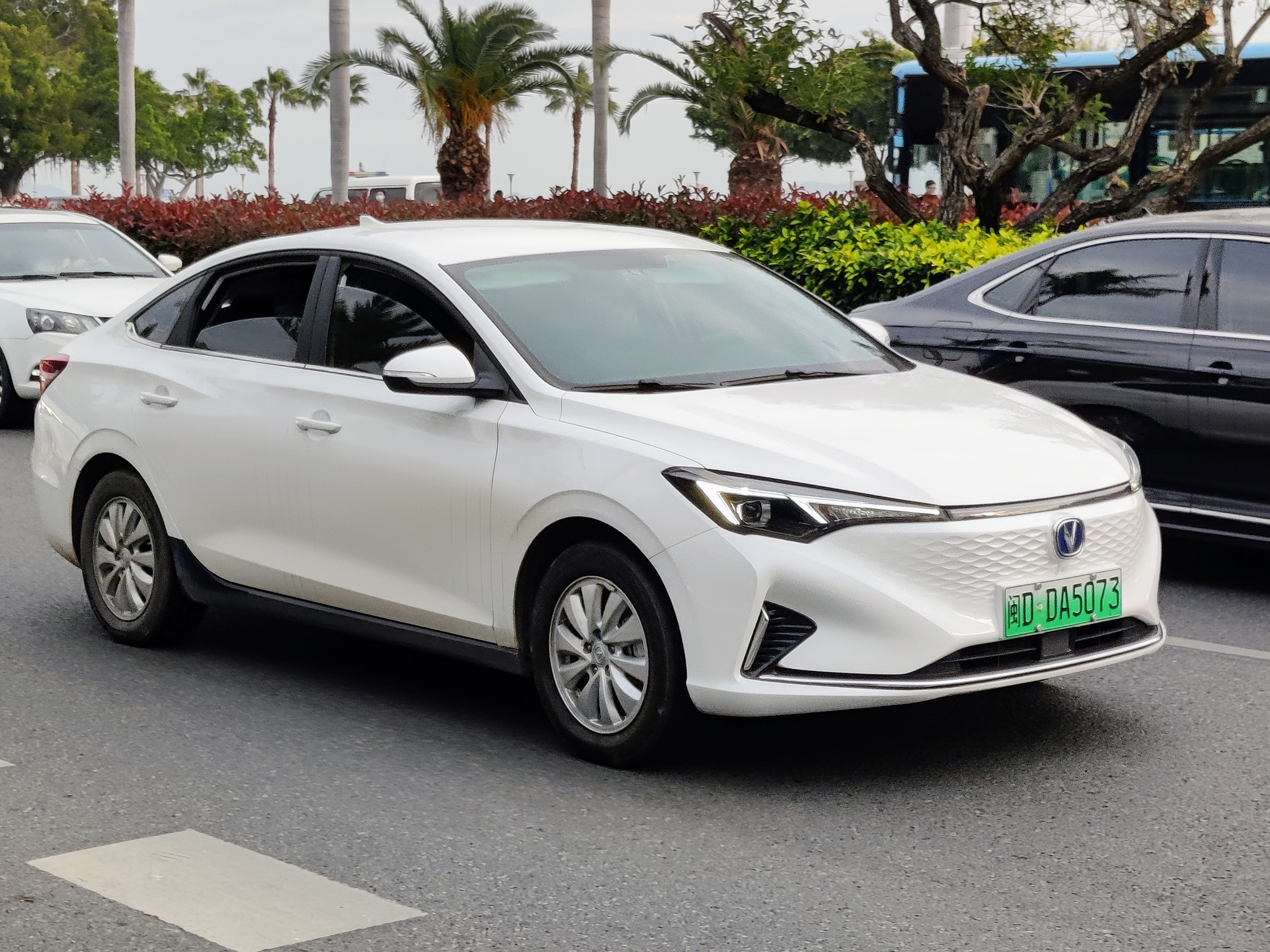
The front view of the Changan Eado EV II facelift

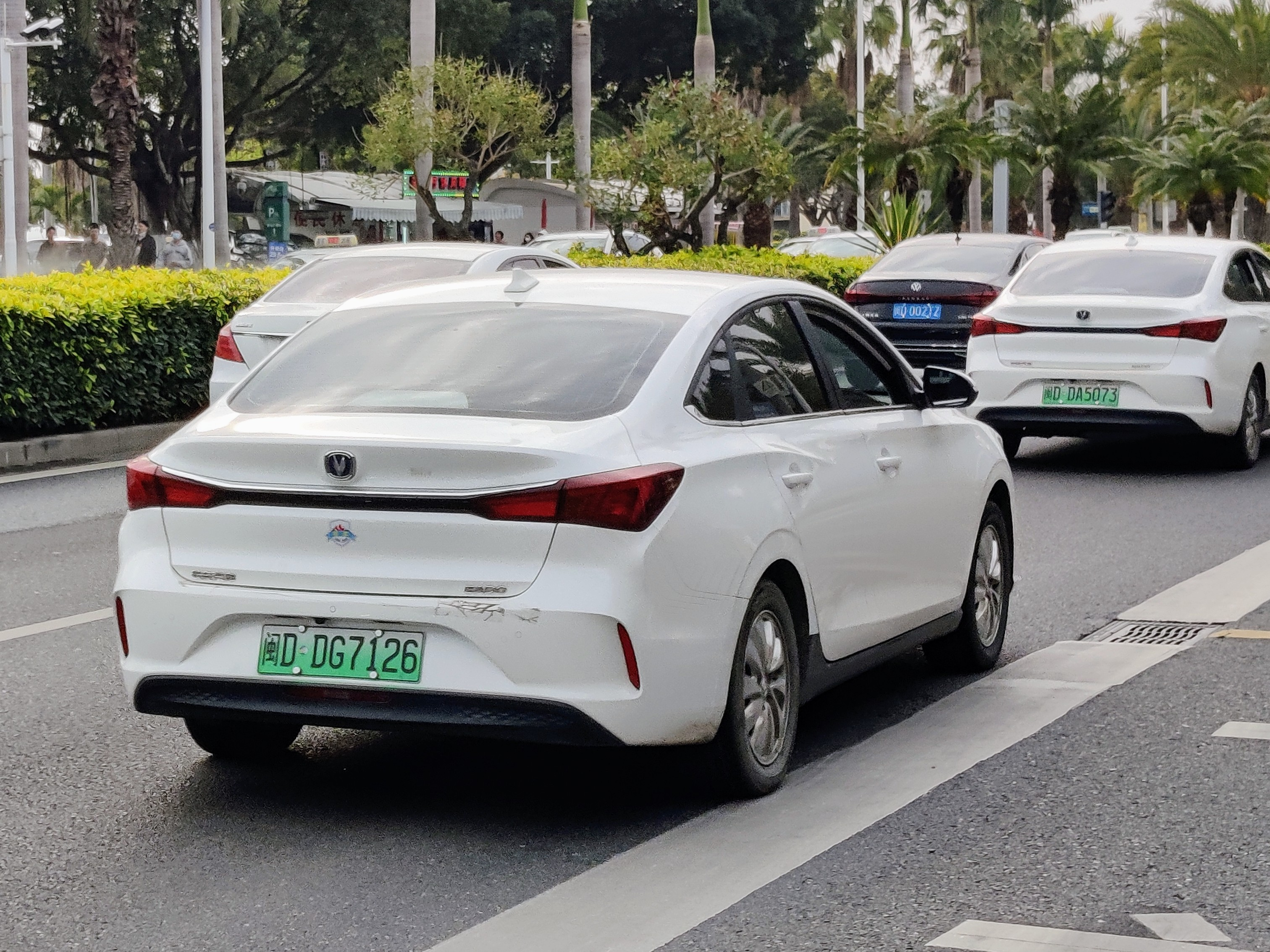
The rear view of the Changan Eado EV II facelift

=== Eado Plus ===
As of December 2019, Changan has officially unveiled the 2020 Eado sedan facelift named the Eado Plus sedan in China. The Eado Plus offers 2 distinctive styling appearance trims for buyers to choose from including Standard and Sports. The dimensions of the Eado Plus remain the same other than the length of 4,730 mm (186.2 in), a 20 mm (0.79 in) increase. Engine options include a liter naturally aspirated engine producing 127 hp (95 kW; 129 PS) and a 1.4 liter turbocharged engine producing 157 hp (117 kW; 159 PS), mated to transmissions including a 5-speed manual gearbox, a 6-speed manual gearbox and a 7-speed dual clutch transmission.

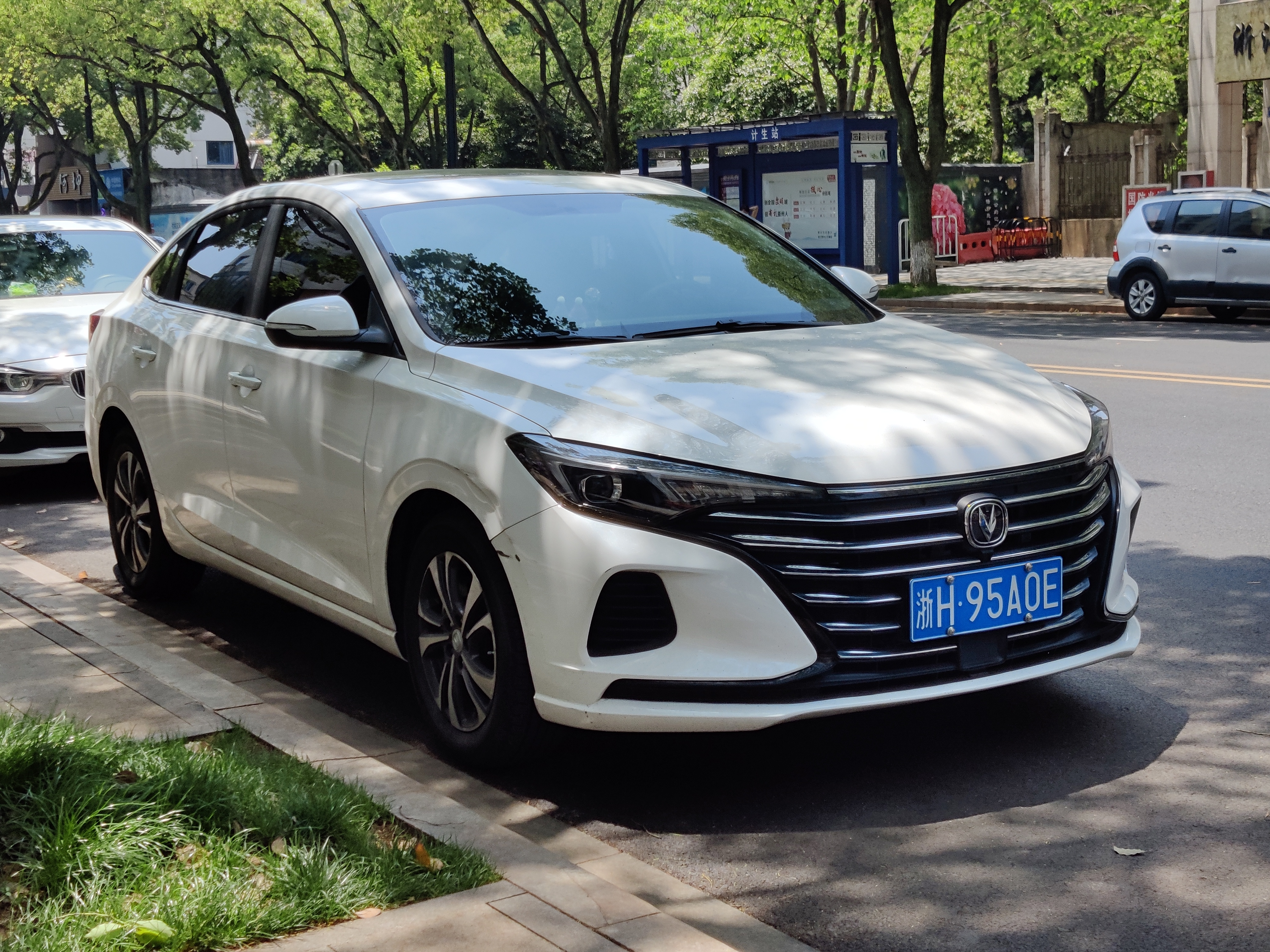
The front view of the Changan Eado Plus

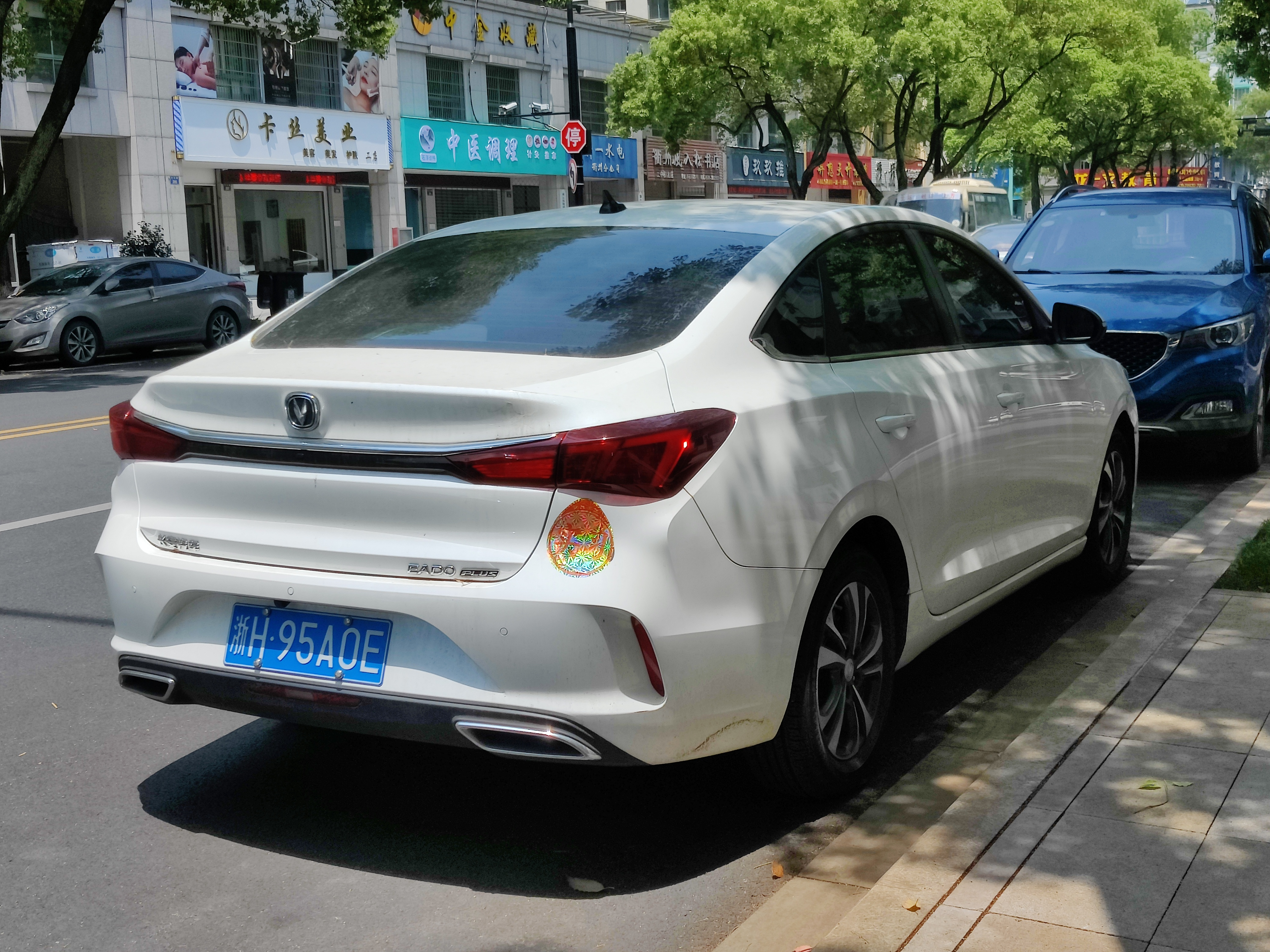
The rear view of the Changan Eado Plus

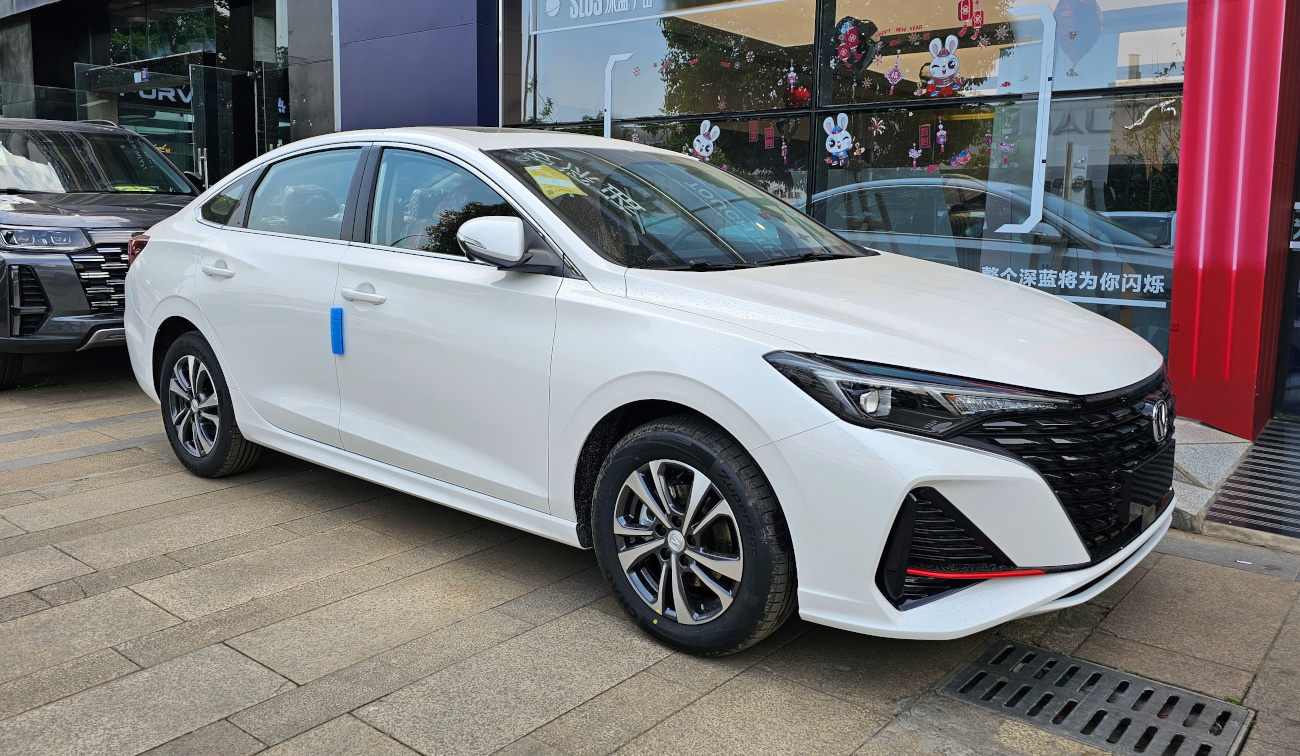
Changan Eado Plus facelift (2022)

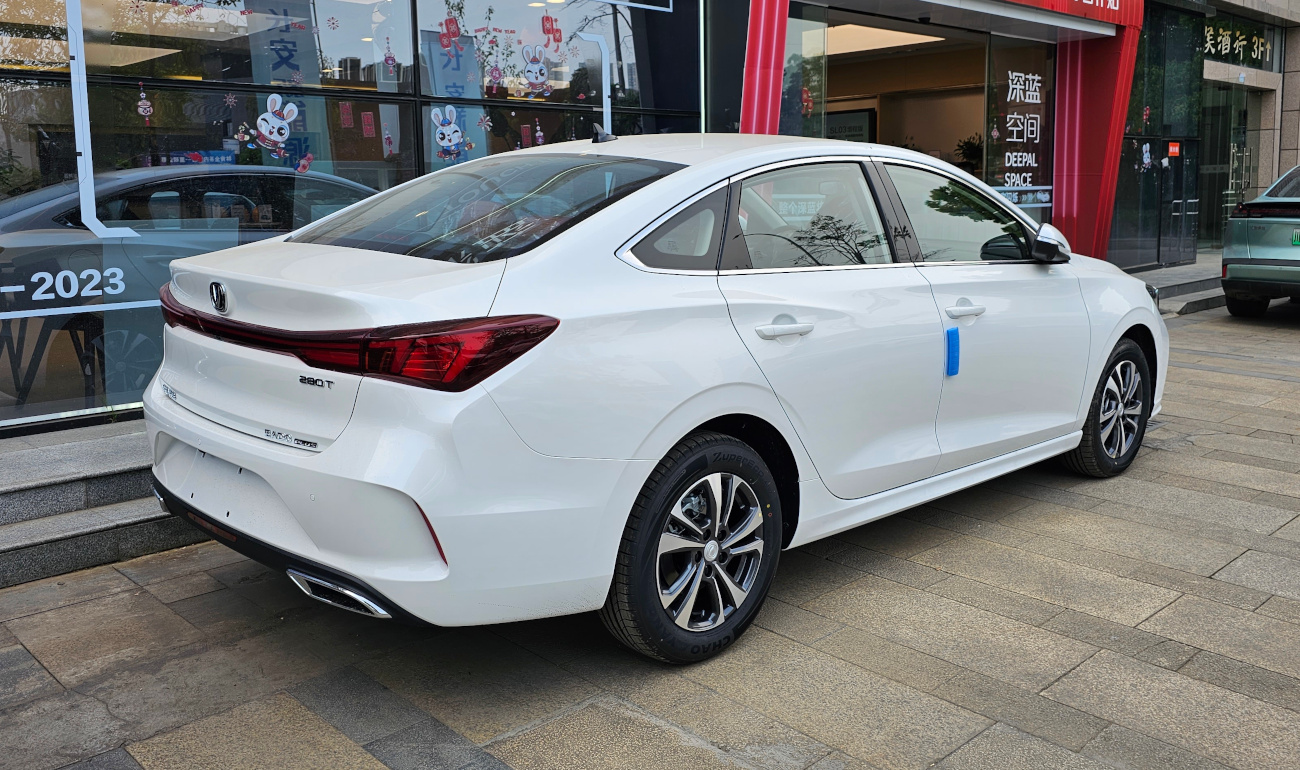
Changan Eado Plus facelift

== Third generation (2024–present) ==
Changan Eado III
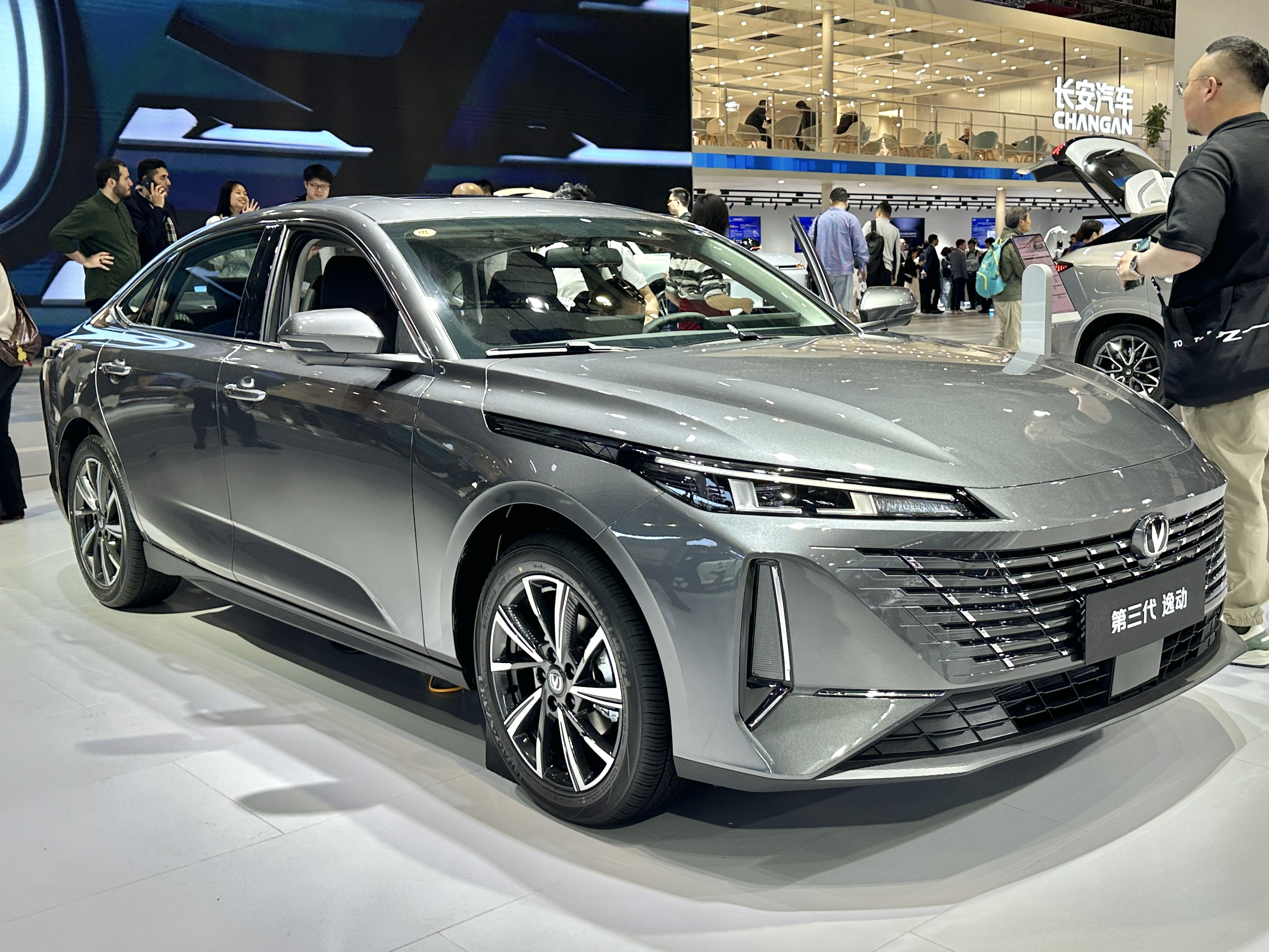

Overview
- Manufacturer: Changan
- Also called: Changan Lamore (before renaming); Changan Nevo A05 (PHEV); Oshan 520 (BEV; 2024–present); Oshan 530 (BEV; 2026–present)
- Production: 2023–present

Body and chassis
- Class: Compact car (C)
- Body style: 4-door sedan
- Layout: Front-engine, front-wheel-drive
- Platform: Ark platform

Powertrain
- Engine: 1.5 L Blue Whale I4 (turbo petrol); 1.4 L Blue Core I4 (turbo petrol)
- Transmission: 7 speed DCT

Dimensions
- Wheelbase: 2,765 mm (108.9 in)
- Length: 4,770 mm (187.8 in)
- Width: 1,840 mm (72.4 in)
- Height: 1,440 mm (56.7 in)

In March 2024, Changan announced the third generation of Eado, which is a renamed Changan Lamore with different pricing and equipment configurations.

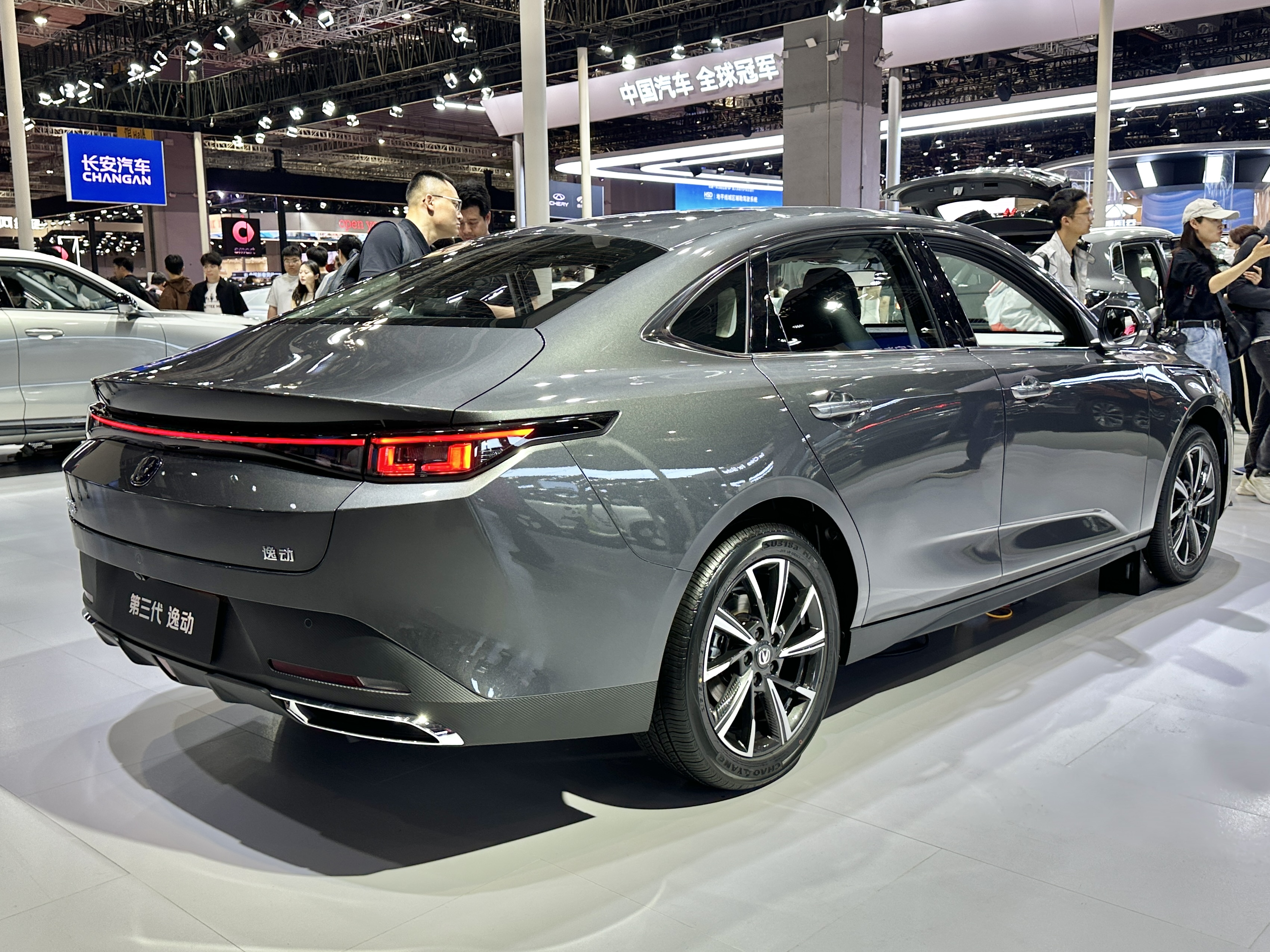
Rear view of the third generation Changan Eado based on the Lamore sedan.

=== Oshan 520 ===
A battery-electric version of the Eado/Lamore capable of battery swapping sold under the Oshan marque was launched in November 2024 called the Oshan 520. The 520 is 30 mm (1.2 in) taller, and is the first vehicle to use CATL's second generation Choco-SEB swappable battery packs. It is powered by a 105 kW (141 hp; 143 PS) motor and has a CLTC range rating of 515 kilometres (320 mi). According to Changan, the battery pack can be swapped in two minutes. It has a curb weight of 1,535 kg (3,384 lb) and a top speed of 135 km/h (84 mph).

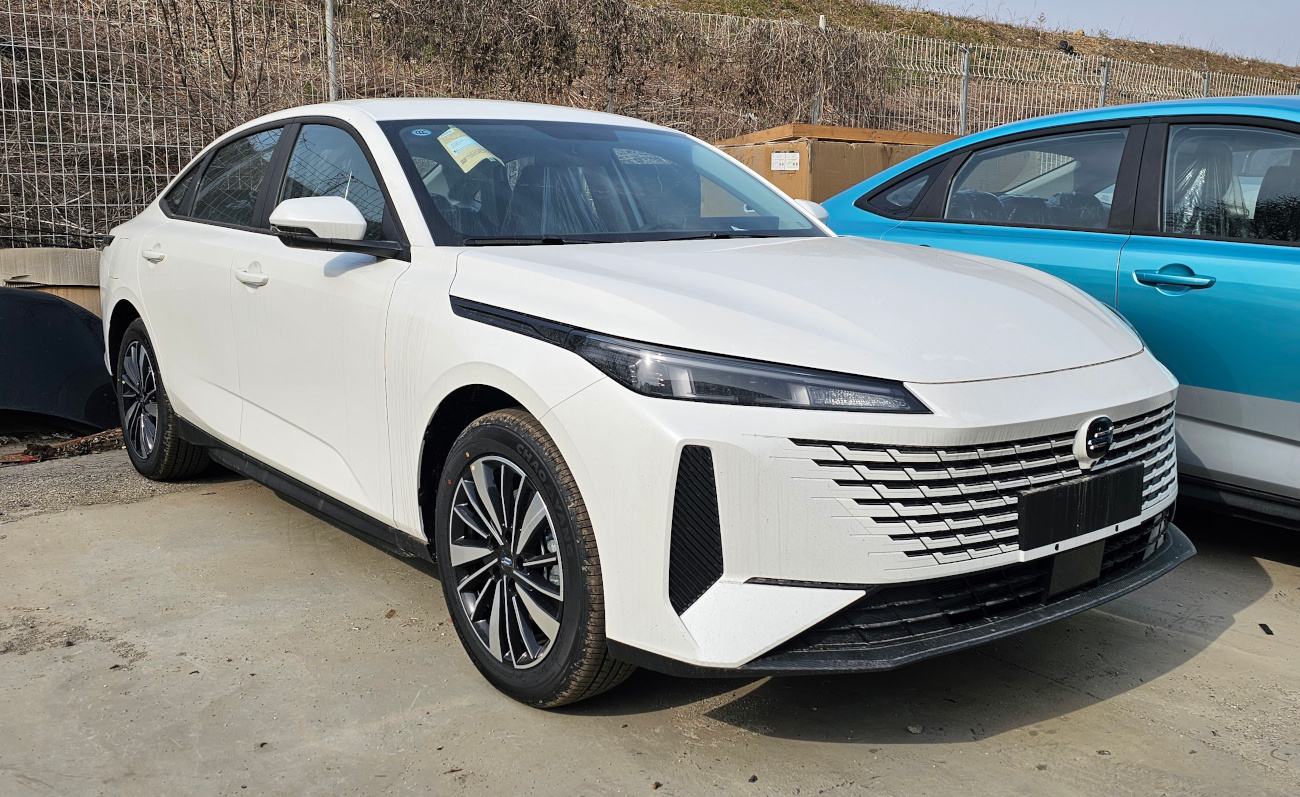
Oshan 520

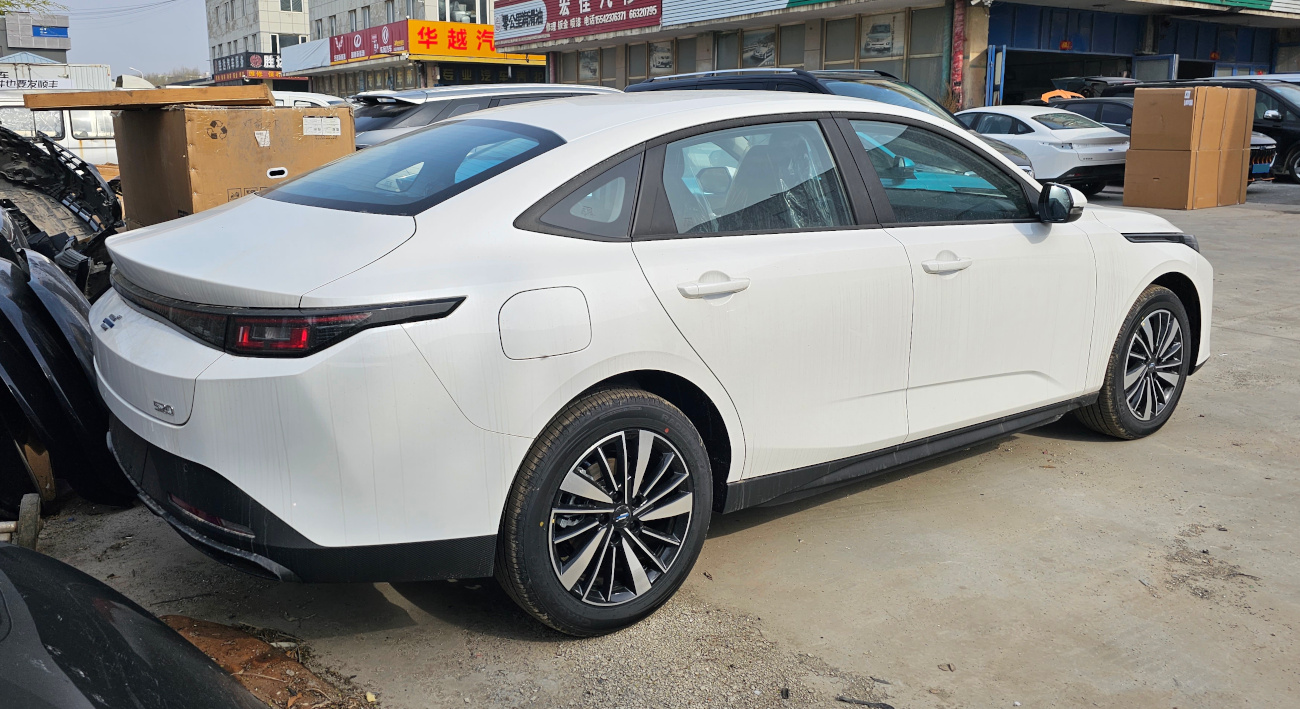
Oshan 520

=== 2025 facelift (marketed as fourth generation) ===
A facelift was introduced in August 2025; renamed Eado Fourth Generation (第四代逸动).

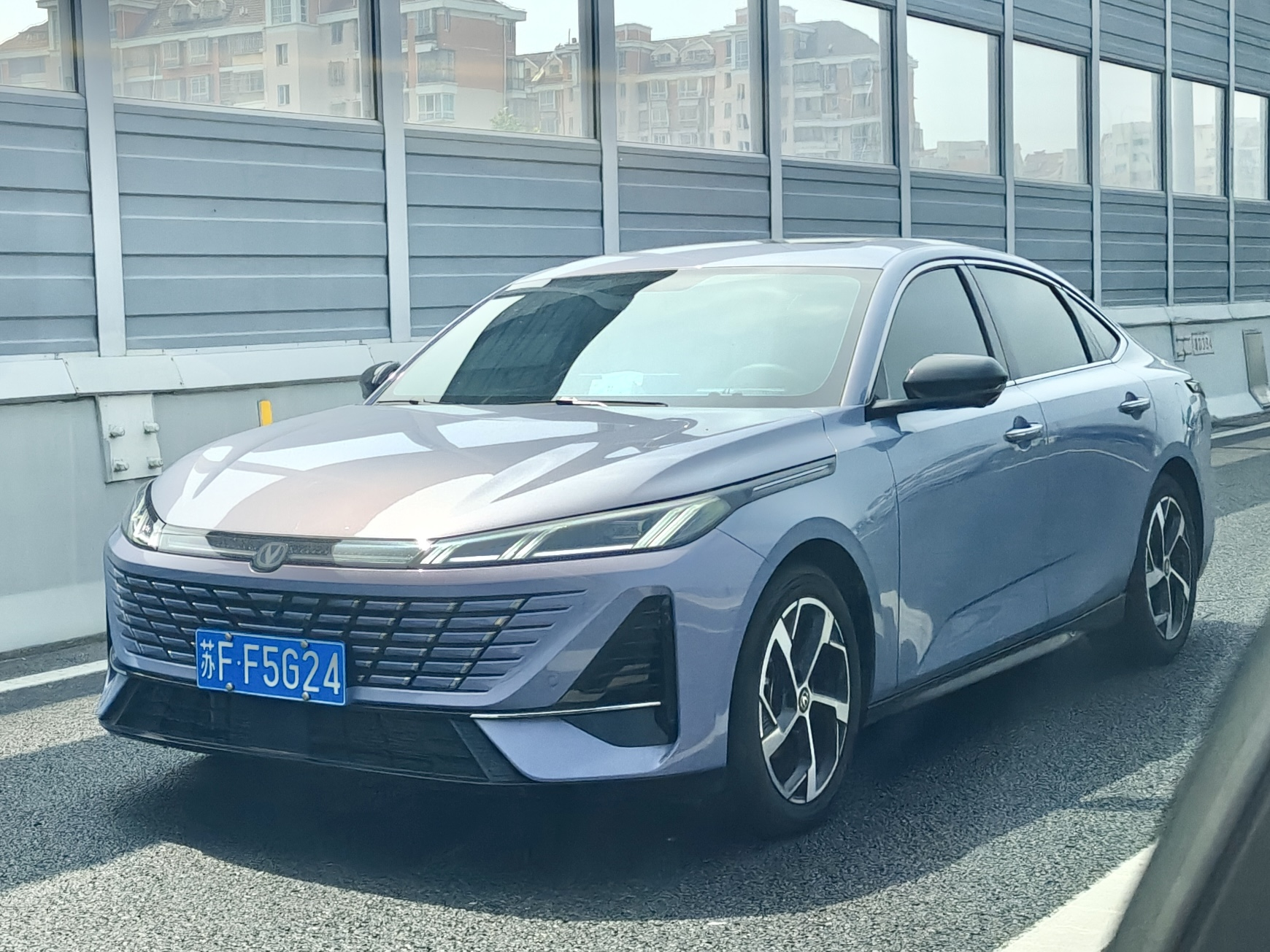
Changan Eado IV

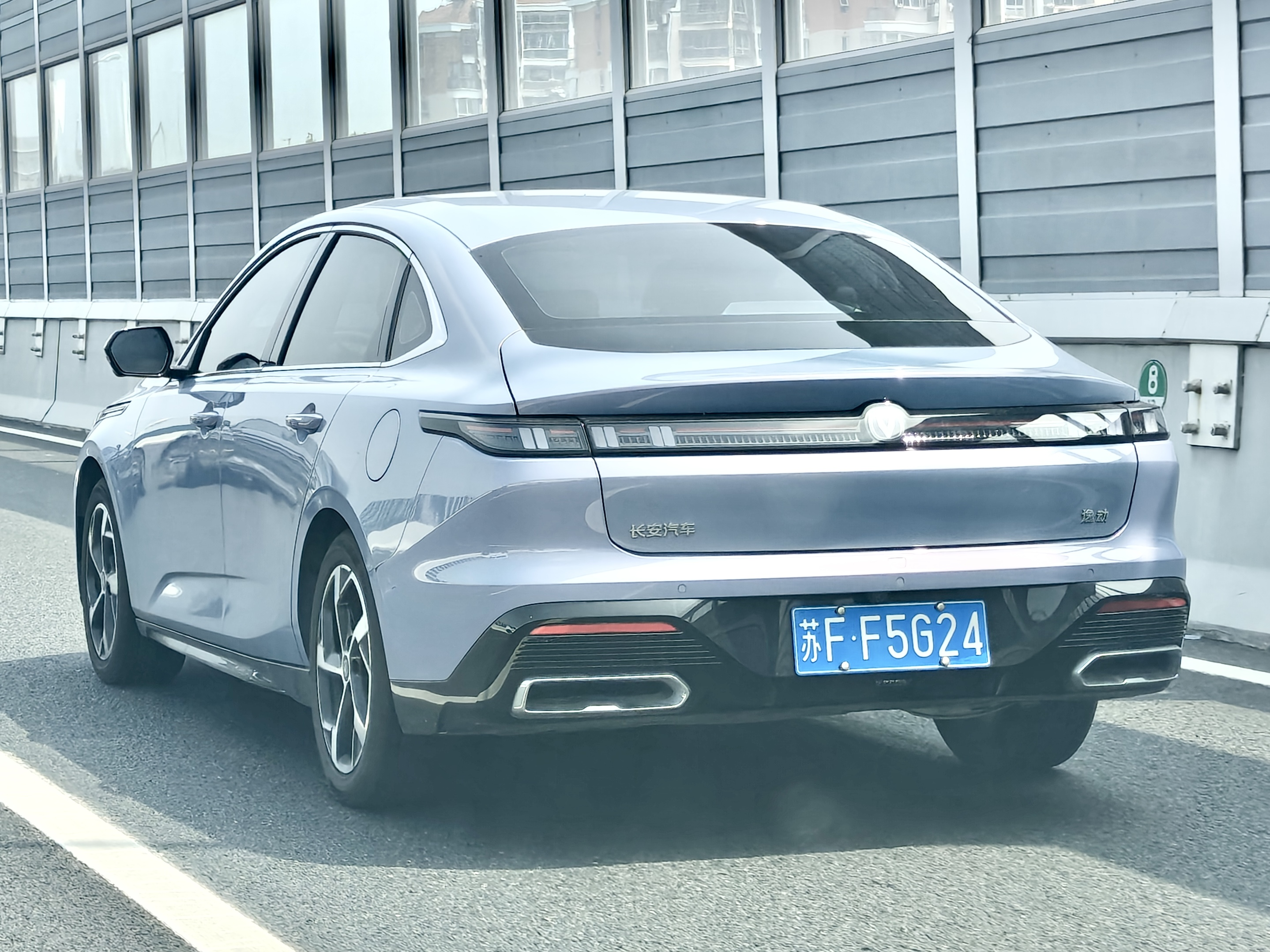
Rear

== Sales ==
Year	China			Mexico		Total production	
Year	Eado	EV	PHEV	Eado	iDD	Eado	EV
2021			—			170,198	—
2022			—			154,141	18,944
2023	157,710	8,404	—			164,099	11,064
2024	150,997	6,931	—			157,328	6,571
2025	162,363	2,890	2,695	972	830	195,607	4,412
