= WYXE =

Coordinates: 36°24′38″N 86°27′16″W

- Gallatin, Tennessee; United States
- Frequency: 1130 kHz
- Branding: Radio Vida 1130

Programming
- Format: Spanish Christian

Ownership
- Owner: Iglesia de Dios Hispana de Nashville
- Sister stations: WMRB, WSBI

Technical information
- Licensing authority: FCC
- Facility ID: 3424
- Class: D
- Power: 2,300 watts day 940 watts critical hours
- Repeaters: 910 WMRB (Columbia); 1210 WSBI (Static)

Links
- Public license information: Public file; LMS
- Webcast: Webcast via AmeriListen
- Website: radiovida1130.com

WYXE (1130 AM, "Radio Vida 1130") is a religious radio station broadcasting in Spanish from Gallatin, Tennessee . It operates only during daytime hours. It is owned by Iglesia de Dios Hispana de Nashville.
