= WSBI (AM) =

- Static, Tennessee; United States
- Frequency: 1210 kHz
- Branding: Radio Vida 1130

Programming
- Format: Spanish Christian

Ownership
- Owner: Iglesia Hispana de Nashville Inc.
- Sister stations: WMRB, WYXE

History
- First air date: September 8, 1986

Technical information
- Licensing authority: FCC
- Facility ID: 25973
- Class: D
- Power: 10,000 watts day 2,500 watts critical hours
- Transmitter coordinates: 36°37′22.00″N 85°5′15.00″W

Links
- Public license information: Public file; LMS
- Webcast: Webcast via AmeriListen
- Website: radiovida1130.com

WSBI (1210 kHz, "Radio Vida") is a daytime-only AM radio station broadcasting a Spanish Christian music format. It is licensed to Static, Tennessee, United States, and is owned by Iglesia Hispana de Nashville Inc.

WSBI programming is a simulcast of WYXE.

From its sign on date in 1986 until August 22, 2009, the station broadcast a country music format.
