= Changan CX30 =

Chinese compact car

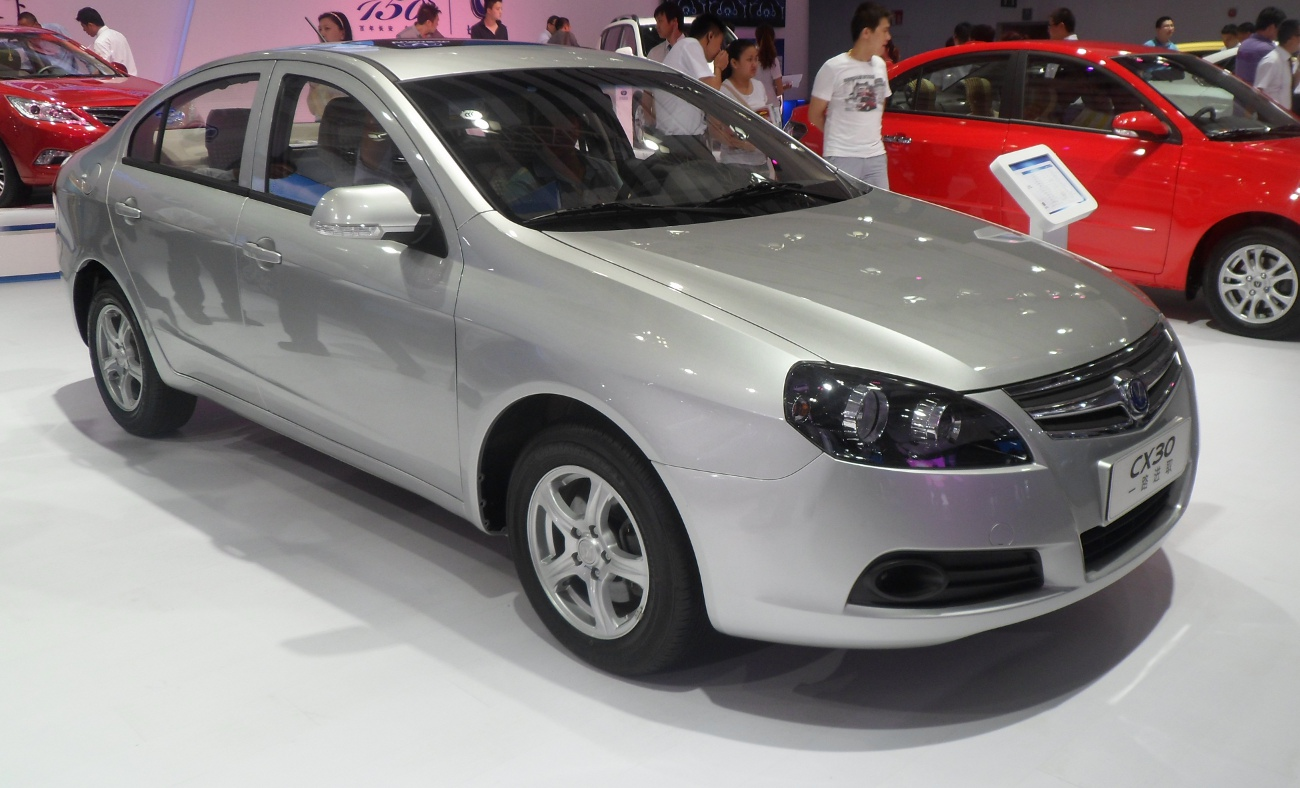

Overview
- Manufacturer: Changan
- Also called: Chang'an Zhixiang (志翔); Chang'an CV8; Chana Z-Shine
- Production: 2008–2010 (Chang'an Zhixiang); 2010–2012
- Model years: 2008–2012

Body and chassis
- Class: Compact car/Small family car (C)
- Body style: 5-door hatchback; 4-door sedan
- Layout: Front-engine, front-wheel-drive

Powertrain
- Engine: 1.6 L JL475QK I4 (petrol); 2.0 L JL486Q2 I4 (petrol)
- Transmission: 5-speed manual; 4-speed automatic

Dimensions
- Wheelbase: 2,650 mm (104.3 in)
- Length: 4,450 mm (175.2 in) (hatchback)
- Width: 1,800 mm (70.9 in)
- Height: 1,475 mm (58.1 in) (hatchback)

Chronology
- Predecessor: Changan CV8
- Successor: Changan Eado

The Changan CX30 is a compact sedan and hatchback produced by Chinese car manufacturer Changan Automobile. It was originally only available as a sedan called the Changan Z-Shine.

== Overview ==
Originally unveiled the Changan Z-Shine. (Chinese: 长安志翔; pinyin: Cháng'ān Zhìxiáng, codename CV8) It was officially launched at the 2008 Beijing Motor Show.

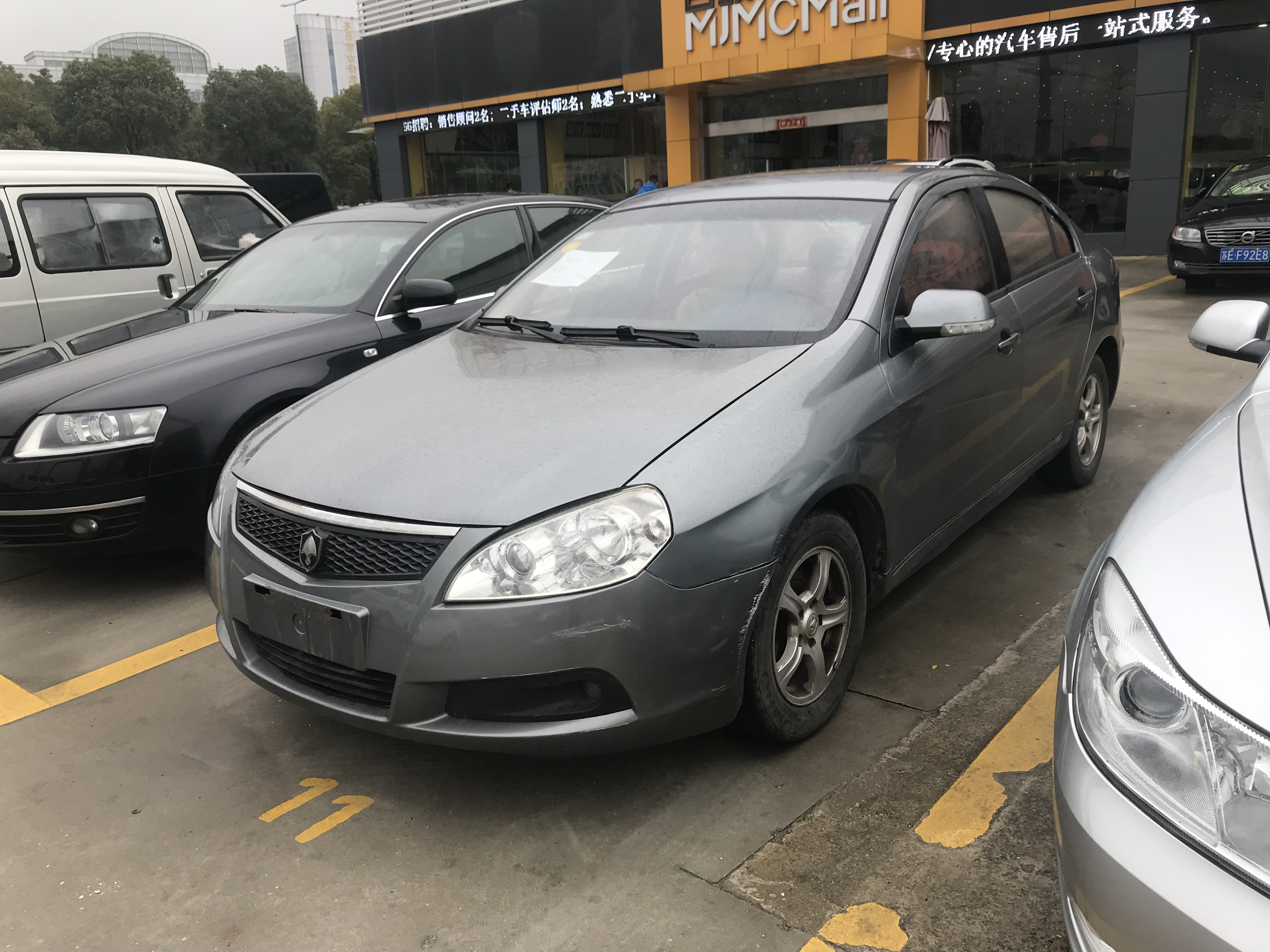
Changan Z-Shine sedan front

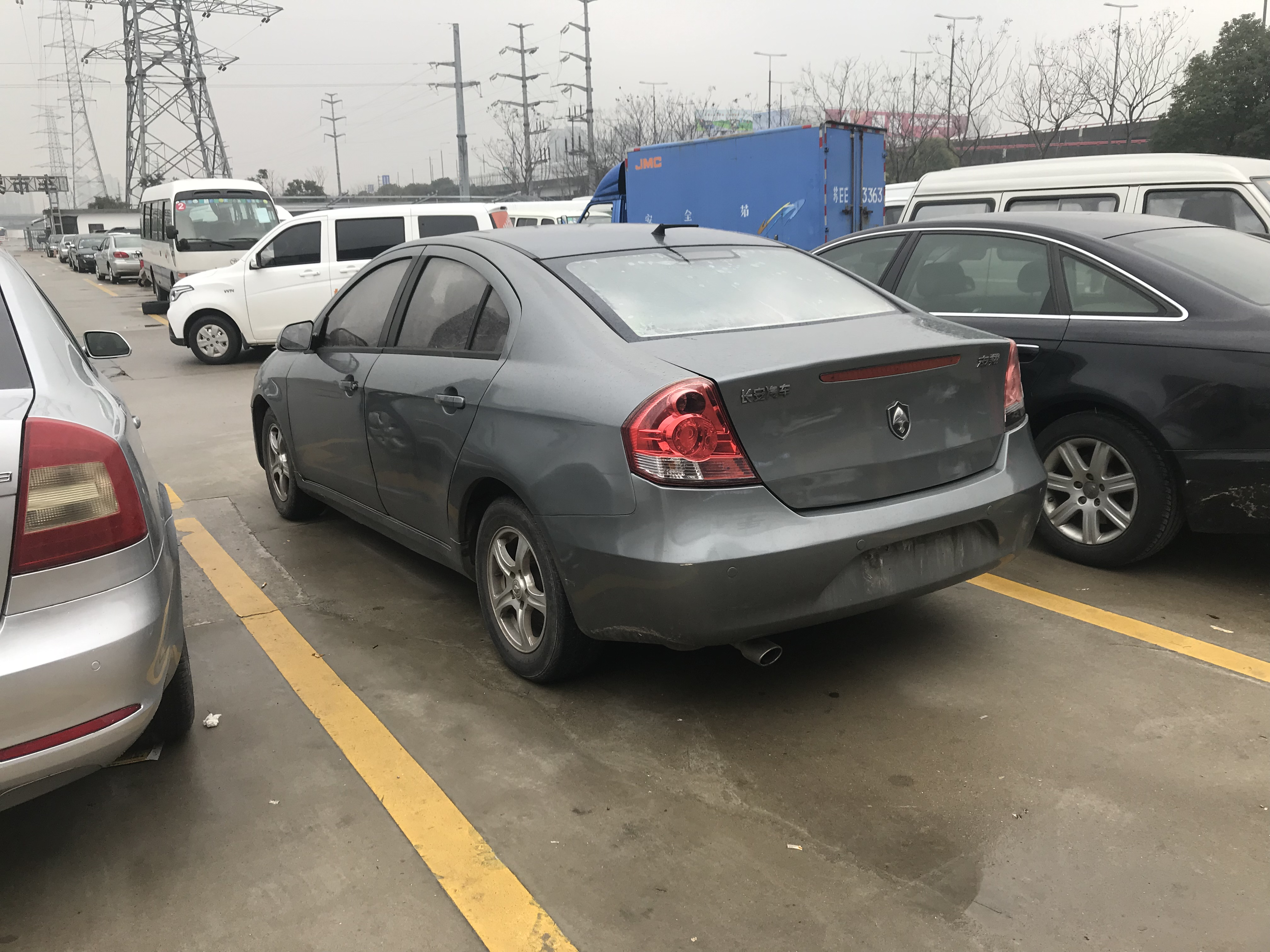
Changan Z-Shine sedan rear

The model later received a minor facelift and name change to the CX30. Changan unveiled the CX30 compact hatchback at the 2010 Beijing Auto Show.

Engines available for the Changan CX30 are a 1.6L 71kW putting out 140 nm of torque and a 2.0L 112kW putting out 192 nm of torque. The CX30 sedan, listed in January 2011 was based on the CX30 hatchback and positioned slightly above the CX30 hatchback in the market. Price ranges from 66,800 yuan to 106,800 yuan.

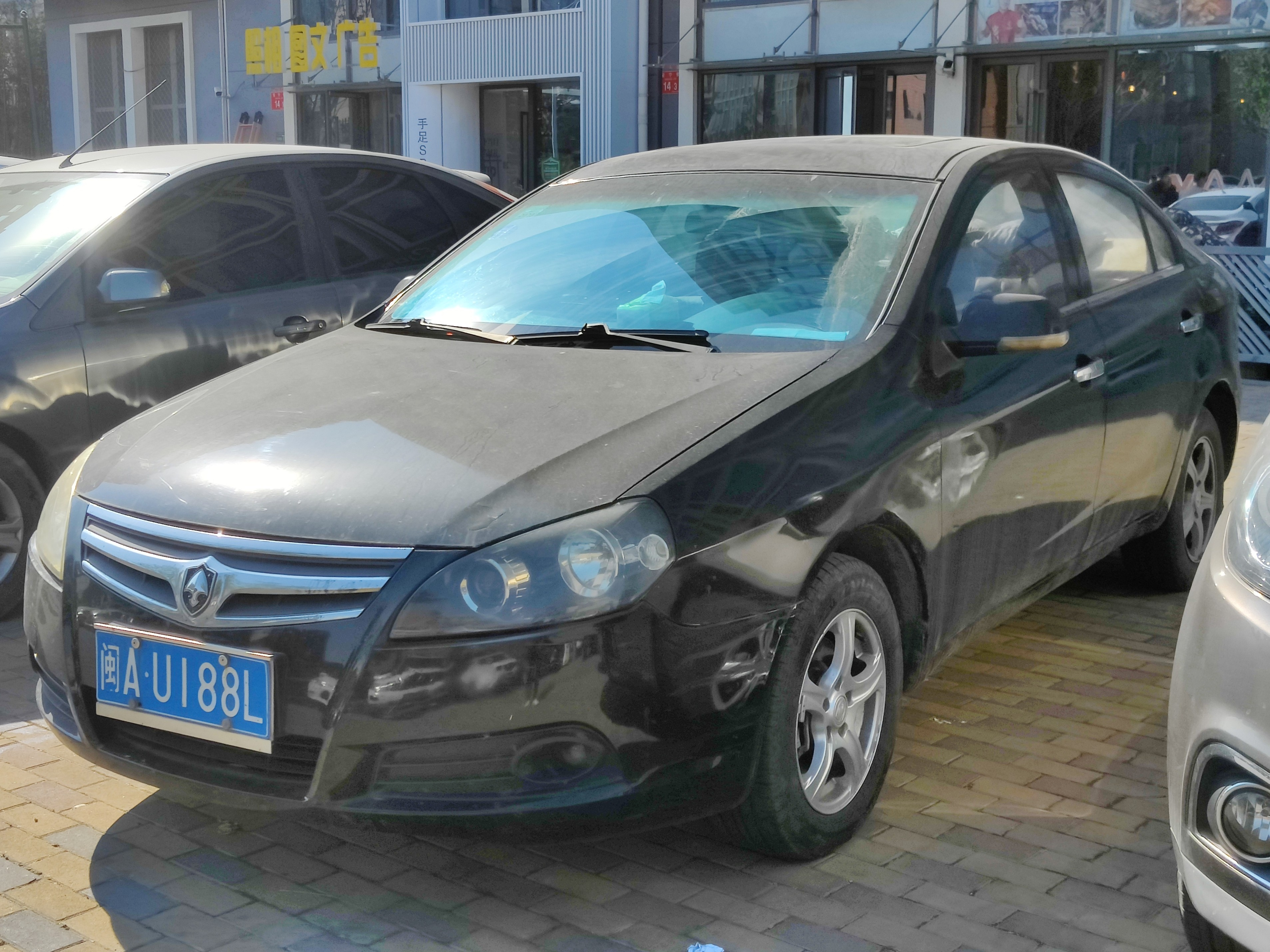
Changan CX30 sedan front

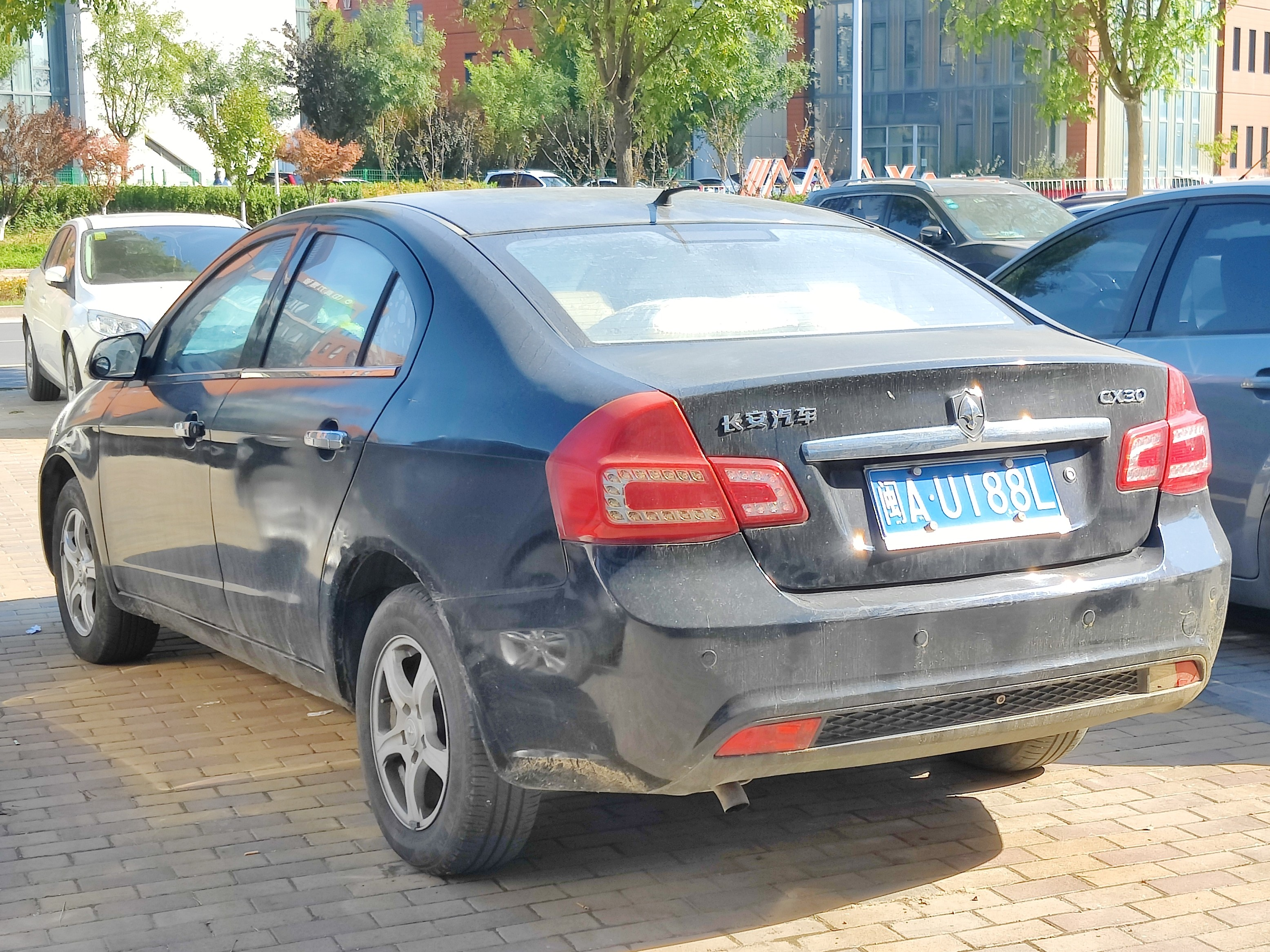
Changan CX30 sedan rear

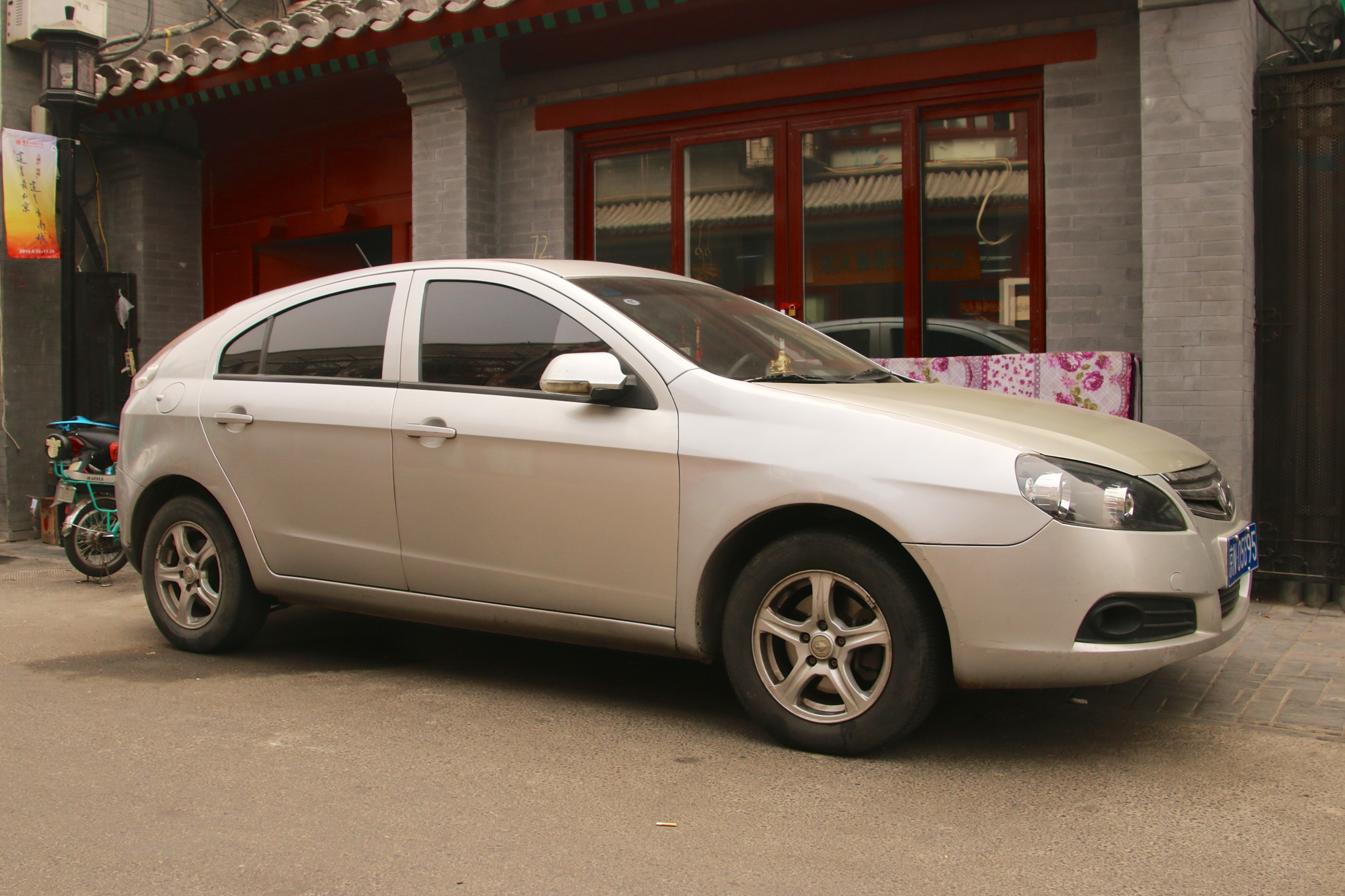
Changan CX30 hatchback front

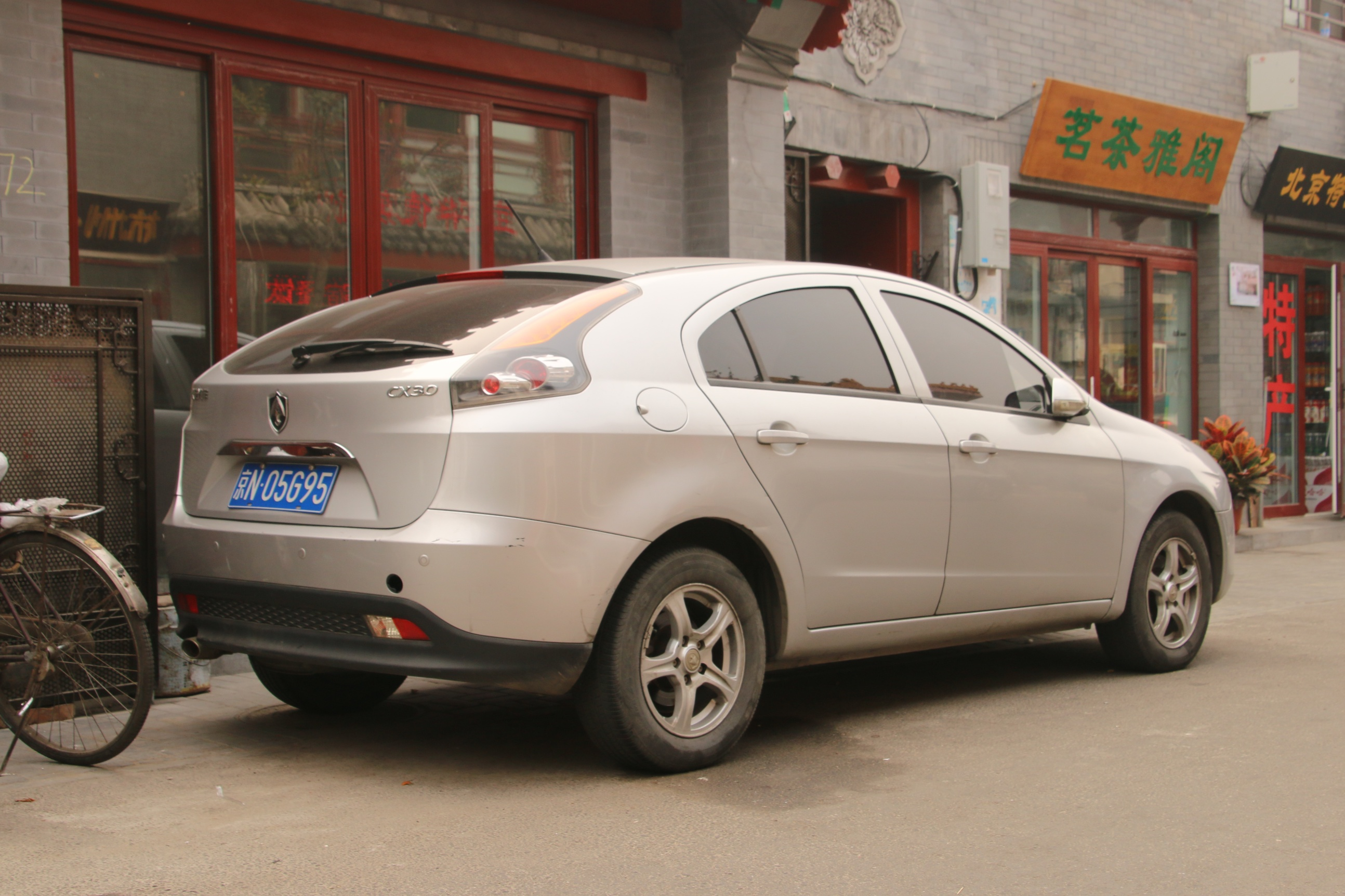
Changan CX30 hatchback rear
