= WRRL =

- Rainelle, West Virginia; United States
- Broadcast area: Rainelle, West Virginia; Rupert, West Virginia
- Frequency: 1130 kHz
- Branding: The River 107.7

Programming
- Format: Classic rock

Ownership
- Owner: Shilo Communications, Inc.

History
- First air date: February 1, 1974
- Call sign meaning: W R RaineLle

Technical information
- Licensing authority: FCC
- Facility ID: 54411
- Class: D
- Power: 1,000 watts daytime only
- Transmitter coordinates: 37°57′28.0″N 80°45′45.0″W
- Translator: See § Translators

Links
- Public license information: Public file; LMS
- Website: theriver107.com

WRRL (1130 AM, "The River 107.7") is a classic rock formatted broadcast radio station licensed to Rainelle, West Virginia, serving Rainelle and Rupert in West Virginia. WRRL is owned and operated by Shilo Communications, Inc.

== History ==
On June 5, 2017, WRRL changed their format from southern gospel to classic rock, branded as "The River 107.7" (simulcast on W299CF 107.7 FM Fayetteville).

== Translators ==
Broadcast translator for WRRL
Call sign	Frequency	City of license	FID	ERP (W)	HAAT	Class	FCC info
W269DV	101.7 FM	Beckley, West Virginia	157019	250	71 m (233 ft)	D	LMS
W299CF	107.7 FM	Fayetteville, West Virginia	158550	250	336 m (1,102 ft)	D	LMS
W299CZ	107.7 FM	Lewisburg, West Virginia	150633	250	272 m (892 ft)	D	LMS
W299DC	107.7 FM	Summersville, West Virginia	157429	250	239 m (784 ft)	D	LMS
