= WOIZ =

Guayanilla, Puerto Rico; Puerto Rico
- Frequency: 1130 kHz
- Branding: Radio Antillas

Programming
- Format: Spanish Variety
- Affiliations: WKAQ 580; Camarero Radio Network

Ownership
- Owner: Radio Antillas, Inc.; (Radio Antillas of Harriet Broadcasters of PR, Inc. (Luis Adan Rodriguez, III)

History
- First air date: December 18, 1986

Technical information
- Licensing authority: FCC
- Facility ID: 54483
- Class: B
- Power: 200 watts day 700 watts night

Links
- Public license information: Public file; LMS
- Webcast: Listen Live
- Website: www.radioantillaspr.com

WOIZ (1130 AM, "Radio Antillas") is a radio station licensed to serve Guayanilla, Puerto Rico. The station is owned by Radio Antillas, Inc. It airs a Spanish variety music format.

The station was assigned the WOIZ call letters by the Federal Communications Commission on March 12, 1985.

Former logo
