= WEAF (AM) =

- Camden, South Carolina; United States
- Frequency: 1130 kHz

Programming
- Format: Urban contemporary gospel

Ownership
- Owner: Glory Communications, Inc.

History
- First air date: 1971
- Former call signs: WPUB (1970–1982); WCCG (1982–1983); WPUB (1983–1987); WVEF (1987–1995); WAME (1995–1999); WQIS (1999–2005)

Technical information
- Licensing authority: FCC
- Facility ID: 24146
- Class: D
- Power: 5,000 watts (day); 7 watts (night)
- Transmitter coordinates: 34°15′32.5″N 80°34′46.3″W
- Translator: 99.5 W258DL (Camden)

Links
- Public license information: Public file; LMS
- Website: worshipandwordnetwork.com

WEAF (1130 AM) is a commercial radio station licensed to Camden, South Carolina, United States. Owned by Glory Communications, it carries an urban contemporary gospel format. In addition to AM, WEAF is relayed on FM over low-power translator W258DL (99.5 FM) also licensed to Camden.

== History ==
At one time, this station had the letters WAME and an adult standards format. GHB Broadcasting, the then-owners, switched the format to sports talk and changed the callsign to WQIS.

Colonial Radio Group acquired WQIS in 2003. In April 2006, Glory Communications Inc. purchased WEAF from Colonial Radio Group for a reported sale price of $222,500; at that time, the format was urban contemporary gospel.

On November 8, 2016, the Federal Communications Commission granted WEAF a construction permit to move to 1120 kHz from a new transmitter site, change the community of license to Saint Stephen, decrease day power to 390 watts, and eliminate night operation.

From 1922 to 1946, WEAF was the callsign of the radio station that became WNBC and the flagship station of the NBC Red Network. This station is now known as WFAN in New York. In the mid-1970s, WEAF was the callsign of the current WPTI in Eden, North Carolina.
