= Radio Nacional (Uruguay) =

Coordinates: 34.795753°S 56.320982°W

CX 30 Radio Nacional
- Montevideo; Uruguay
- Broadcast area: Uruguay
- Frequency: 1130 AM

History
- First air date: 1925

Technical information
- Licensing authority: FCC

Links
- Public license information: 30 Radio Nacional Public file; LMS
- Website: www.radionacional.com.uy

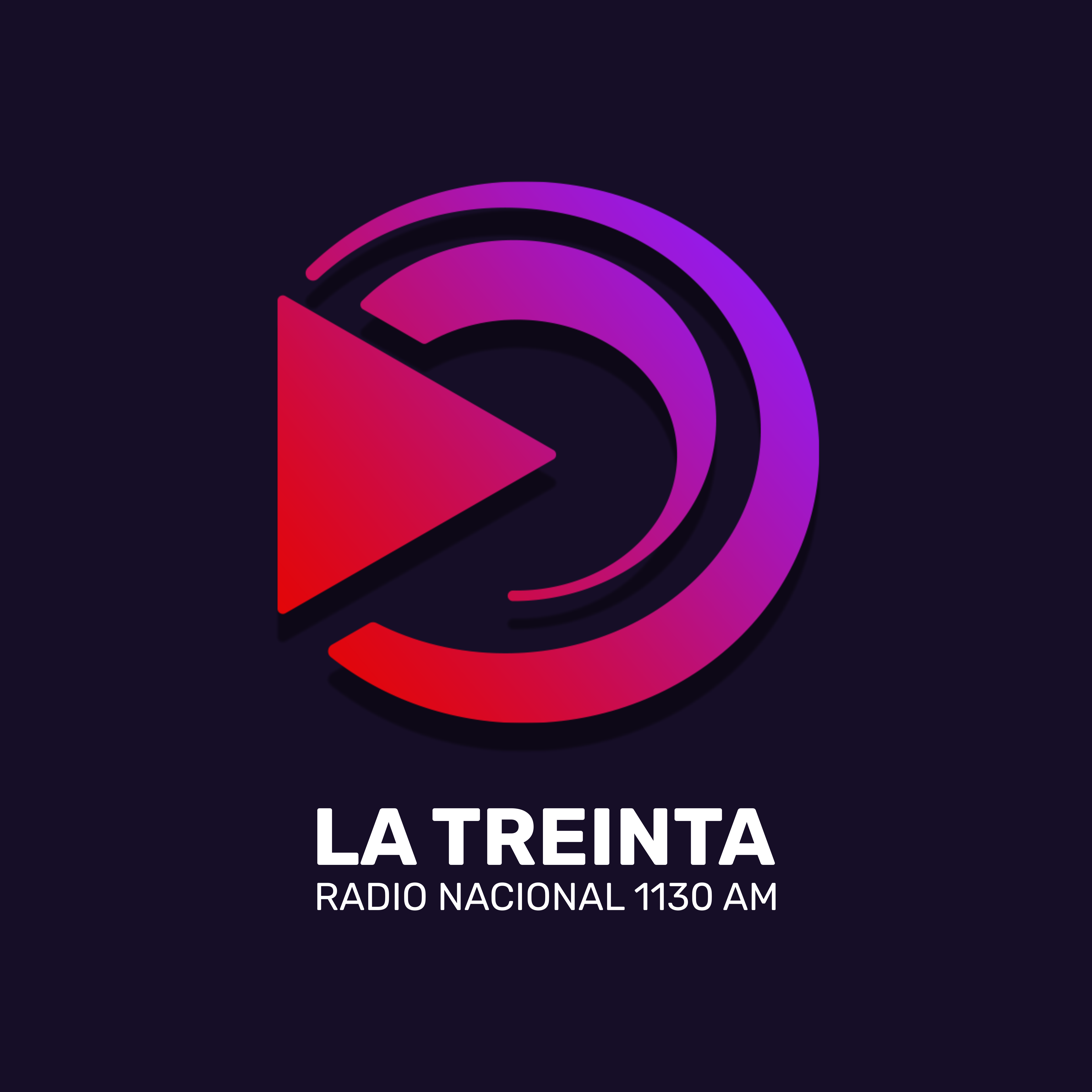
Official logo

CX 30 Radio Nacional is a Uruguayan Spanish language AM radio station that broadcasts from Montevideo, Uruguay.

== History ==
Radio Nacional was established during the early "Golden Age" of Uruguayan radio in 1925.. Throughout the mid-20th century, the station became a cornerstone of the country's media landscape, serving as a primary source for news, traditional folk music, and political discourse.
