= Alex Anthopoulos =

Canadian baseball executive (born 1977)

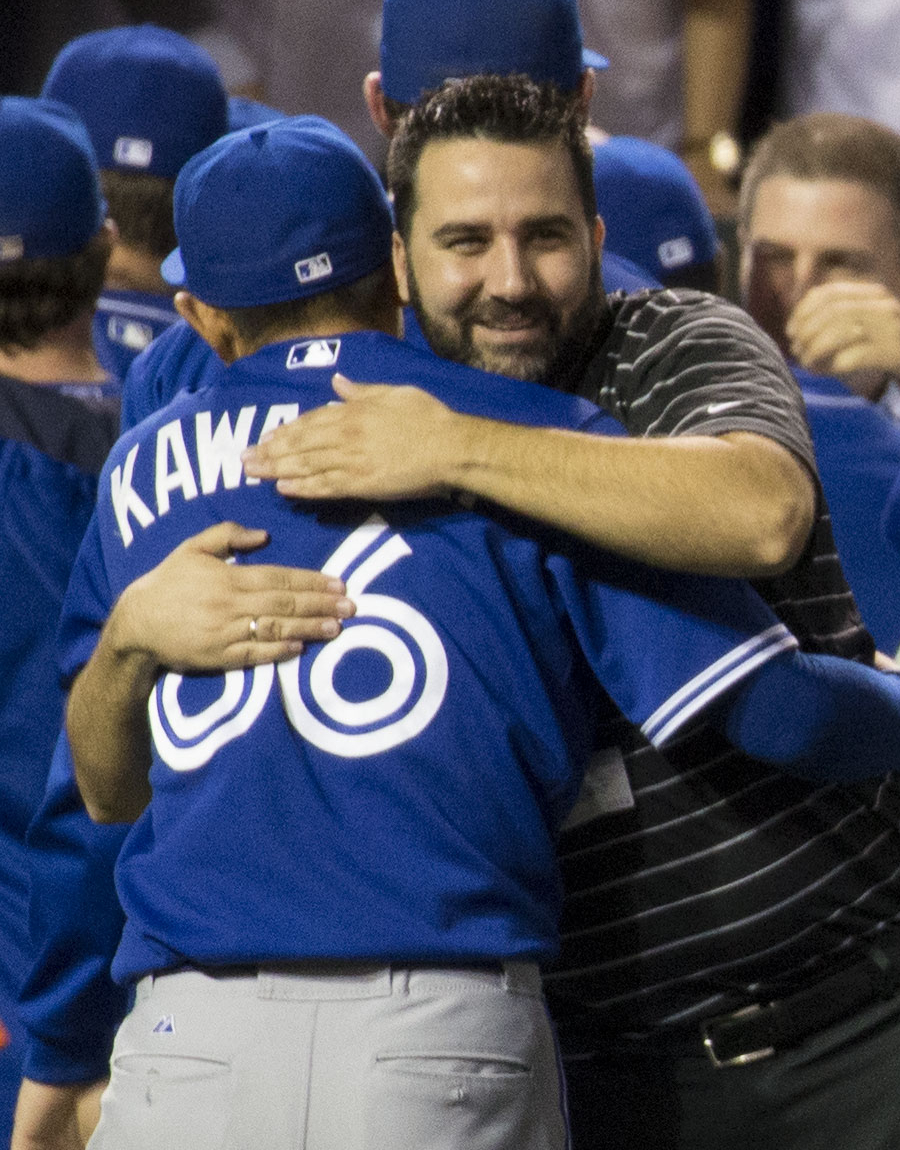
- Anthopoulos in 2015

Atlanta Braves
- President of baseball operations / General manager
- Born: May 25, 1977 (age 49); Montreal, Quebec, Canada
- Stats at Baseball Reference

Teams
- As general manager: Toronto Blue Jays (2009–2015); Atlanta Braves (2017–present)

Career highlights and awards
- Sporting News Executive of the Year (2015); World Series champion (2021)

Alex Anthopoulos (born May 25, 1977), nicknamed by his initials "A.A.", is a Canadian professional baseball executive, currently serving as general manager and president of baseball operations for the Atlanta Braves, which won the 2021 World Series.

Anthopoulos got his start in professional baseball with the Montreal Expos organization in 2000. He was the senior vice president of baseball operations and general manager of the Toronto Blue Jays of Major League Baseball (MLB) from 2010 to 2015, for whom he began as a scouting coordinator in 2003. In 2015, he was named the Sporting News Executive of the Year after the Blue Jays advanced to the playoffs for the first time since 1993, reaching the American League Championship Series (ALCS). However, his term with the Blue Jays ended on October 29, 2015, when he declined a five-year contract extension. He served for two years as vice president of baseball operations for the Los Angeles Dodgers.

== Career ==
=== Montreal Expos (2000–2003) ===
In 2000, Anthopoulos was hired by the Montreal Expos as an unpaid intern, and worked sorting players' fan mail. After working in the mail room he would sit with the scouts at games and take notes, and was eventually moved to a scouting internship in Florida. In 2002, he was promoted to the Expos' scouting coordinator. He would leave the team at the end of the 2003 season, while working as the assistant scouting director.

=== Toronto Blue Jays (2003–2015) ===
Anthopoulos joined the Toronto Blue Jays in late 2003, as their scouting coordinator. After the 2005 season, he was promoted to assistant general manager (AGM) under J. P. Ricciardi. While he was serving as AGM, the Blue Jays acquired José Bautista and Edwin Encarnación, each of whom unexpectedly experienced a career renaissance, establishing new levels of production and consistency that were key components of the Blue Jays' offense during Anthopoulos' time as GM. Bautista was the MLB home run leader from 2010–11, and, in each year from 2010 to 2015, was an All-Star and hit at least 27 home runs. Encarnacion hit at least 34 home runs each year from 2012 to 2015.

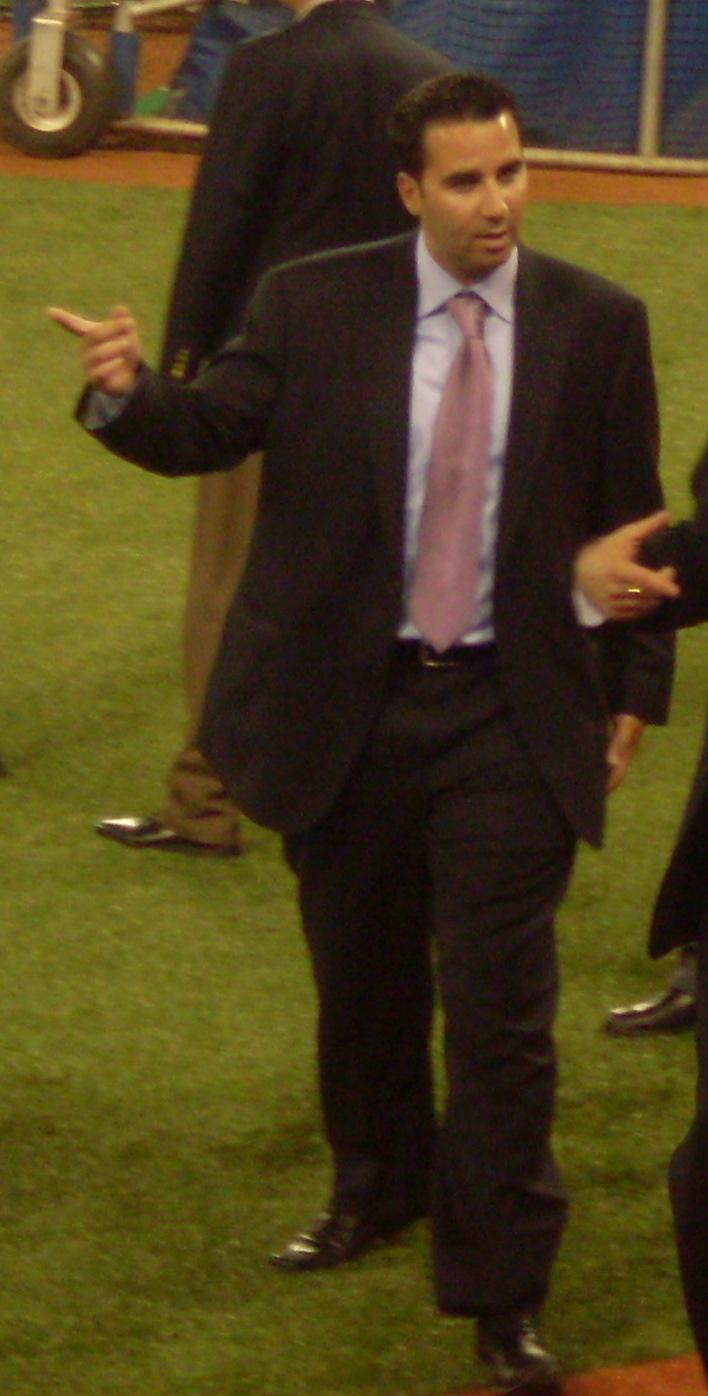
Anthopoulos in 2010

Anthopoulos became the Blue Jays' general manager in October 2009, after Ricciardi was fired. He began his tenure as the general manager by playing a major role in one of the biggest trades in Blue Jays history, "The Doc Deal". In the deal, Anthopoulos traded Roy Halladay to the Philadelphia Phillies for Kyle Drabek, Michael Taylor, and Travis d'Arnaud.

Anthopoulos was also instrumental in doubling the size of the Blue Jays' scouting department, growing it to 54 scouts in various positions. The 2010 draft, the first with Anthopoulos in charge, resulted in a highly successful draft with a number of players picked eventually enjoying significant playing careers in the majors, including Aaron Sanchez and Noah Syndergaard.

The Jays' first season with Anthopoulos at the helm resulted in an 85–77 record, good for fourth place in the American League (AL) East division. The club hit a franchise-record 257 home runs, the third-highest single-season total by any club in Major League history.

In January 2011, Anthopoulos completed a blockbuster trade by shipping another long-time face of the Blue Jays franchise, Vernon Wells, and the remaining US$86 million over the next four years to the Los Angeles Angels for catcher Mike Napoli and outfielder Juan Rivera. He then sent Napoli to the Texas Rangers for pitcher Frank Francisco, and later traded Rivera to the Los Angeles Dodgers for a player to be named later or cash considerations. Due to the debacle of the Wells deal, Anthopoulos instituted a “five year policy” on player contracts, while also excluding performance bonuses, incentives, player options, no-trade clauses or opt-out clauses, in making these deals much more team friendly.

In July 2011, Anthopoulos made two successive trades to acquire center fielder Colby Rasmus from the St. Louis Cardinals. In the first, the Blue Jays traded pitching prospect Zach Stewart and reliever Jason Frasor to the Chicago White Sox for starting pitcher Edwin Jackson and infielder Mark Teahen. Jackson was then traded with outfielder Corey Patterson, and relief pitchers Marc Rzepczynski and Octavio Dotel to the Cardinals for Rasmus and relief pitchers Brian Tallet, P.J. Walters and Trever Miller.

Before the 2012 Major League Baseball season, Anthopoulos was known to make trades in order to acquire supplemental draft picks. The most prominent example was when he acquired Miguel Olivo, a Type B free agent, and declined his club option the next day making Olivo a free agent. The Blue Jays gained a supplemental first-round draft pick when Olivo signed with the Seattle Mariners, taking Dwight Smith, Jr.

In November 2012, Anthopolous completed a blockbuster deal with the Miami Marlins, acquiring shortstop Jose Reyes, pitchers Mark Buehrle and Josh Johnson, catcher John Buck, and infielder/outfielder Emilio Bonifacio in exchange for shortstop Yunel Escobar, pitcher Henderson Alvarez, catcher Jeff Mathis and four minor-league prospects. Cash was also sent to the Jays in the trade.

In December 2012, Anthopoulos acquired the 2012 National League Cy Young Award winner R. A. Dickey in a trade with the New York Mets that sent prospects Travis d'Arnaud, Noah Syndergaard, minor leaguer Wuilmer Becerra and Buck to New York. Toronto also received catcher Josh Thole and minor league catcher Mike Nickeas in the trade. As part of the transaction, the Blue Jays signed Dickey to an extension worth a total of $29 million over three years with a $12 million fourth year option.

In 2013, the Blue Jays finished at 74–88, in last place in the AL East. The next year, they improved to 83–79 and third place.

During the 2014 offseason, Anthopoulos traded Canadian third baseman Brett Lawrie, along with three prospects, to the Oakland Athletics for Josh Donaldson. In July 2015, he acquired Troy Tulowitzki and LaTroy Hawkins from the Colorado Rockies in exchange for Jose Reyes, Jeff Hoffman, and Miguel Castro. On July 30, he acquired star left-handed pitcher David Price from the Detroit Tigers in exchange for Daniel Norris, Matt Boyd, and Jairo Labourt. The next day, Anthopoulos traded for outfielder Ben Revere, and in August, acquired shortstop Cliff Pennington. Price went 9–1 with a 2.30 earned run average in 74 1/3 innings pitched for the Blue Jays. The Blue Jays, who had a 50–51 record on July 28, won 43 of their final 61 games to overtake the New York Yankees and win the AL East division crown for their first playoff appearance in 22 seasons. With Donaldson, Bautista, and Encarnación (the latter two acquired by previous GM J.P. Ricciardi) each hitting at least 39 home runs in 2015, the Blue Jays led the major leagues in scoring at 5.50 runs per game. Toronto's season ended in an American League Championship Series (ALCS) loss to the Kansas City Royals. Donaldson was named the 2015 American League Most Valuable Player.

Anthopoulos rejected a five-year extension from the Blue Jays organization on October 29, 2015, and did not publicly reveal the reasons for his decision. He later said "I just think there's certain things that should remain private and behind closed doors, and I know sometimes that's hard to hear and hard to understand. I just think it's the right thing for the organization and the ball club and everybody involved." There was some speculation that his departure was due to the belief that he would not have full autonomy under new president/CEO Mark Shapiro. According to The Globe and Mail, "The talk around the water cooler is that Anthopoulos wanted the same job and responsibility that he had under Beeston, who hired him as GM. That was having the ultimate say in all baseball-related decisions." Shapiro refuted these claims on November 1, stating "It's not about autonomy, it's about collective success". He also denied suggestions that he "scolded" Anthopoulos over several deadline trades involving Blue Jays' top prospects.

Toronto's combined win–loss record was 489–483 while Anthopoulos was GM. On October 29, 2015, Sporting News named him Executive of the Year as selected by a panel of 47 major league executives.

=== Los Angeles Dodgers (2016–2017) ===
On January 12, 2016, Anthopoulos was hired as the vice-president of baseball operations by the Los Angeles Dodgers.

=== Atlanta Braves (2017–present) ===
On November 13, 2017, Anthopoulos was hired as the executive vice president and general manager of the Atlanta Braves after agreeing on a four-year contract. The Braves promoted Anthopoulos to president of baseball operations in February 2020, and extended his contract to the 2024 season. The Braves would go on to win the 2021 World Series. On January 12, 2024, Anthopoulos and the Braves agreed to extend his contract through the 2031 season.

In April of 2019, Anthopoulos signed Ronald Acuna Jr. to an extension through 2026 for $100,000,000. This deal included club options for 2027 and 2028. On February 5, 2021, Anthopoulos signed Marcell Ozuna through 2025 with some club options for 2026. In March of 2022, Anthopoulos completed a blockbuster trade acquiring first baseman Matt Olson from the Oakland Athletics in exchange for four prospects: outfielder Cristian Pache, catcher Shea Langeliers, and right-handers Ryan Cusick and Joey Estes. On August 1, 2022, the Braves announced that Anthopoulos signed Austin Riley to a ten-year contract extension, worth $212 million. Two weeks later, on August 16, Anthopoulos signed Michael Harris II through 2030 with some club options for 2031 and 2032. On October 10, 2022, Anthopoulos signed pitcher Spencer Strider to a six-year, $75 million deal that includes a $22 million option with a $5 million buyout for 2029. In December of 2022, Anthopoulos completed a trade acquiring catcher Sean Murphy in a three-way trade with the Oakland Athletics and Milwaukee Brewers that saw nine players switch teams.

=== Record as a baseball executive ===
Club achievements as baseball executive
Team	Year	Regular Season				Postseason	Occupational title
Team	Year	Won	Lost	Win %	Finish	Result	
TOR	2006	87	75	.537	2nd in AL East	-	Assistant General Manager
TOR	2007	83	79	.512	3rd in AL East	-	Assistant General Manager
TOR	2008	86	76	.531	4th in AL East	-	Assistant General Manager
TOR	2009	75	87	.463	4th in AL East	-	Assistant General Manager
TOR	2010	85	77	.525	4th in AL East	-	General Manager
TOR	2011	81	81	.500	4th in AL East	-	General Manager
TOR	2012	73	89	.451	3rd in AL East	-	General Manager
TOR	2013	74	88	.457	5th in AL East	-	General Manager
TOR	2014	83	79	.512	3rd in AL East	-	General Manager
TOR	2015	93	69	.574	1st in AL East	Lost to Kansas City Royals in 2015 American League Championship Series	General Manager
TOR Total		820	800	.506		1 playoff appearance	
LA	2016	91	71	.562	1st in NL West	Lost to Chicago Cubs in 2016 National League Championship Series	Vice-president of baseball operations
LA	2017	104	58	.642	1st in NL West	Lost to Houston Astros in 2017 World Series	Vice-president of baseball operations
LA Total		195	129	.602		2 playoff appearances	
ATL	2018	90	72	.556	1st in NL East	Lost to Los Angeles Dodgers in 2018 National League Division Series	General Manager
ATL	2019	97	65	.599	1st in NL East	Lost to St. Louis Cardinals in 2019 National League Division Series	General Manager
ATL	2020	35	25	.583	1st in NL East	Lost to Los Angeles Dodgers in 2020 National League Championship Series	President of baseball operations & GM
ATL	2021	88	73	.547	1st in NL East	Defeated Houston Astros in 2021 World Series	President of baseball operations & GM
ATL	2022	101	61	.623	1st in NL East	Lost to the Philadelphia Phillies in the 2022 National League Division Series	President of baseball operations & GM
ATL	2023	104	58	.642	1st in NL East	Lost to the Philadelphia Phillies in the 2023 National League Division Series	President of baseball operations & GM
ATL	2024	89	73	.549	2nd in NL East	Lost to the San Diego Padres in the 2024 National League Wild Card Series	President of baseball operations & GM
ATL	2025	76	86	.469	4th in NL East	-	President of baseball operations & GM
ATL	2026	94	68	.580	1st in NL East	Lost to the Los Angeles Dodgers in the 2026 National League Division Series	President of baseball operations & GM
ATL Total		774	581	.571		8 playoff appearances and 1 World Series title	
Total		1783	1510	.541		11 playoff appearances and 1 World Series title	

== Personal ==
Anthopoulos is of Greek Canadian descent, born in Montreal, Quebec to John Anthopoulos, who owned a heating and ventilation company until his death in 1998. He is the youngest of three sons. Anthopoulos stopped playing sports as a teenager to focus on music, specifically the bass guitar. One of his brothers was a guitarist as well, and the other was a drummer and singer. Anthopoulos holds a degree in economics from McMaster University. Anthopoulos married Cristina in 2010, with whom he has two children, daughter Julia and son John.

== International ==
Anthopoulos served as an advance scout for the Greek National Baseball Team for the 2004 Summer Olympics; which finished in 7th place.
