= List of Major League Baseball career games played as a first baseman leaders =

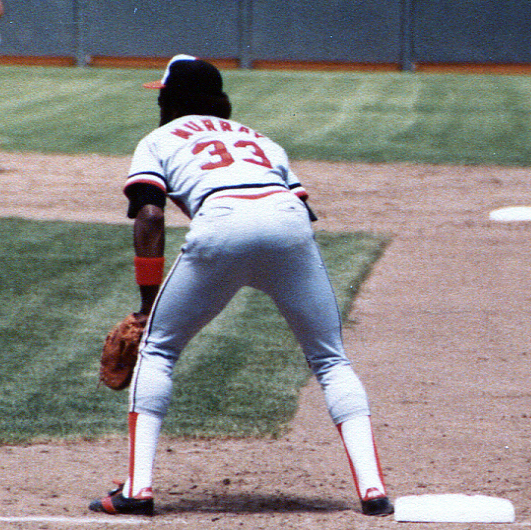
Eddie Murray, the all-time leader in games played as a first baseman.

Games played (most often abbreviated as G or GP) is a statistic used in team sports to indicate the total number of games in which a player has participated (in any capacity); the statistic is generally applied irrespective of whatever portion of the game is contested. In baseball, the statistic applies also to players who, before a game, are included on a starting lineup card or are announced as ex ante substitutes, whether or not they play; however, in Major League Baseball, the application of this statistic does not extend to consecutive games played streaks. A starting pitcher, then, may be credited with a game played even if he is not credited with a game started or an inning pitched. First base, or 1B, is the first of four stations on a baseball diamond which must be touched in succession by a baserunner to score a run for that player's team. A first baseman is the player on the team playing defense who fields the area nearest first base, and is responsible for the majority of plays made at that base. It is the only one of the four infield positions commonly played by left-handed players. In the numbering system used to record defensive plays, the first baseman is assigned the number 3.

Throughout major league history, there have been players who enjoyed long careers as first basemen; in the 19th century, Cap Anson was the first player ever to appear in 2,000 games at any single position. Through 2021, 21 players had appeared in over 2,000 games as first basemen, more than at any other position; at least one of the 21 has been active in every major league season, except the last two years of World War II. Eddie Murray is the all-time leader in career games as a first baseman, playing 2,413 games at the position.

== Key ==
**Rank**	Rank amongst leaders in career games played. A blank field indicates a tie.
**Player (2026 Gs)**	Number of games played during the 2026 Major League Baseball season
**MLB**	Total career games played as a first baseman in Major League Baseball
*	Denotes elected to National Baseball Hall of Fame
**Bold**	Denotes active player (Note: A player is considered inactive if he has announced his retirement or has not played for a full season.)

== List ==
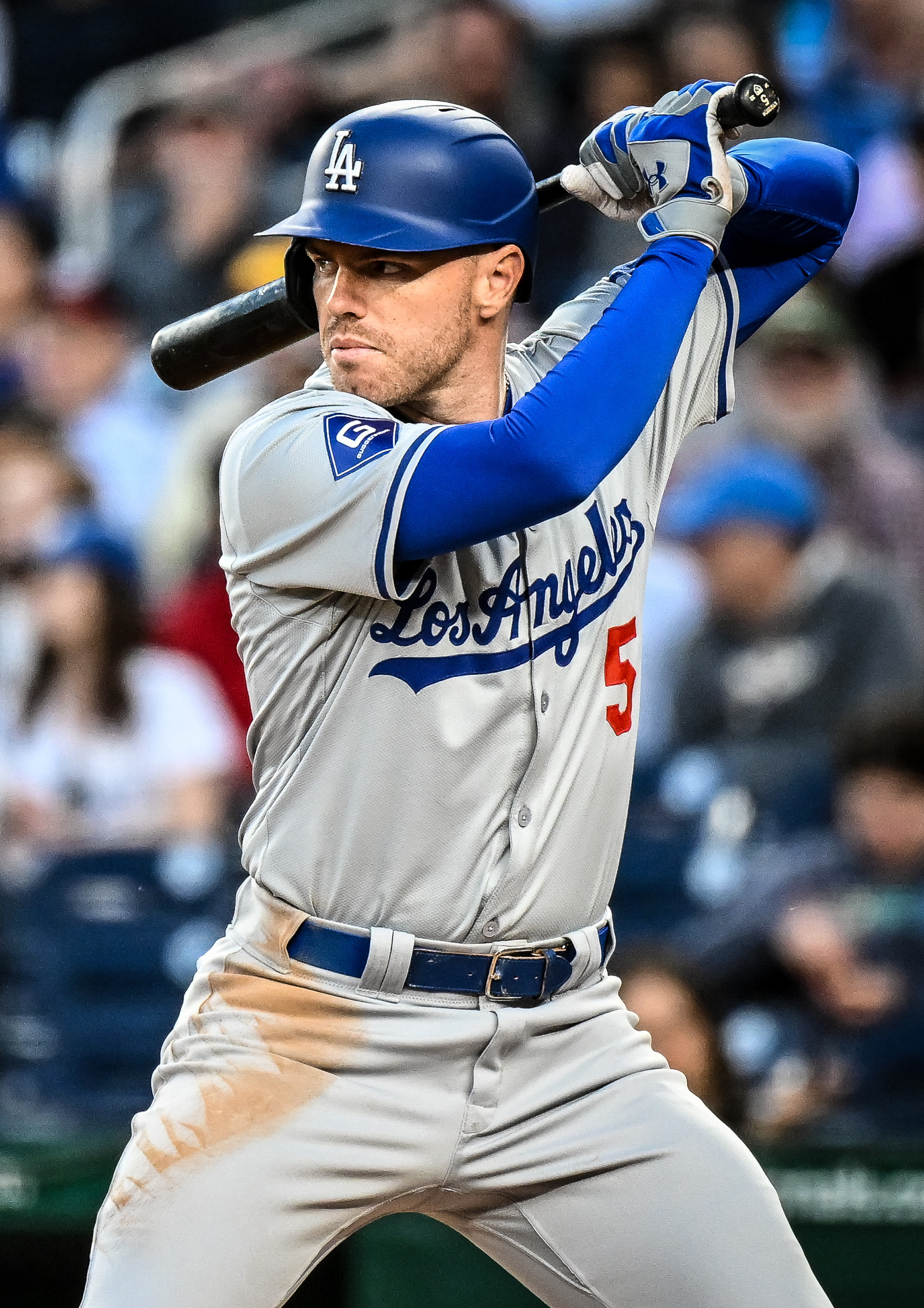
Freddie Freeman, the active leader in games played as a first baseman and 3rd all-time.

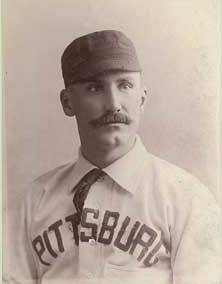
Jake Beckley, the National League record holder, held the major league record for nearly 90 years.

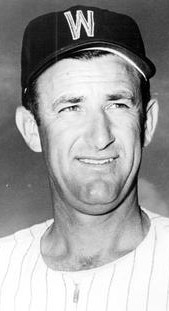
Mickey Vernon, holder of the American League record.

Cap Anson, the first player to play 2,000 games at first base.

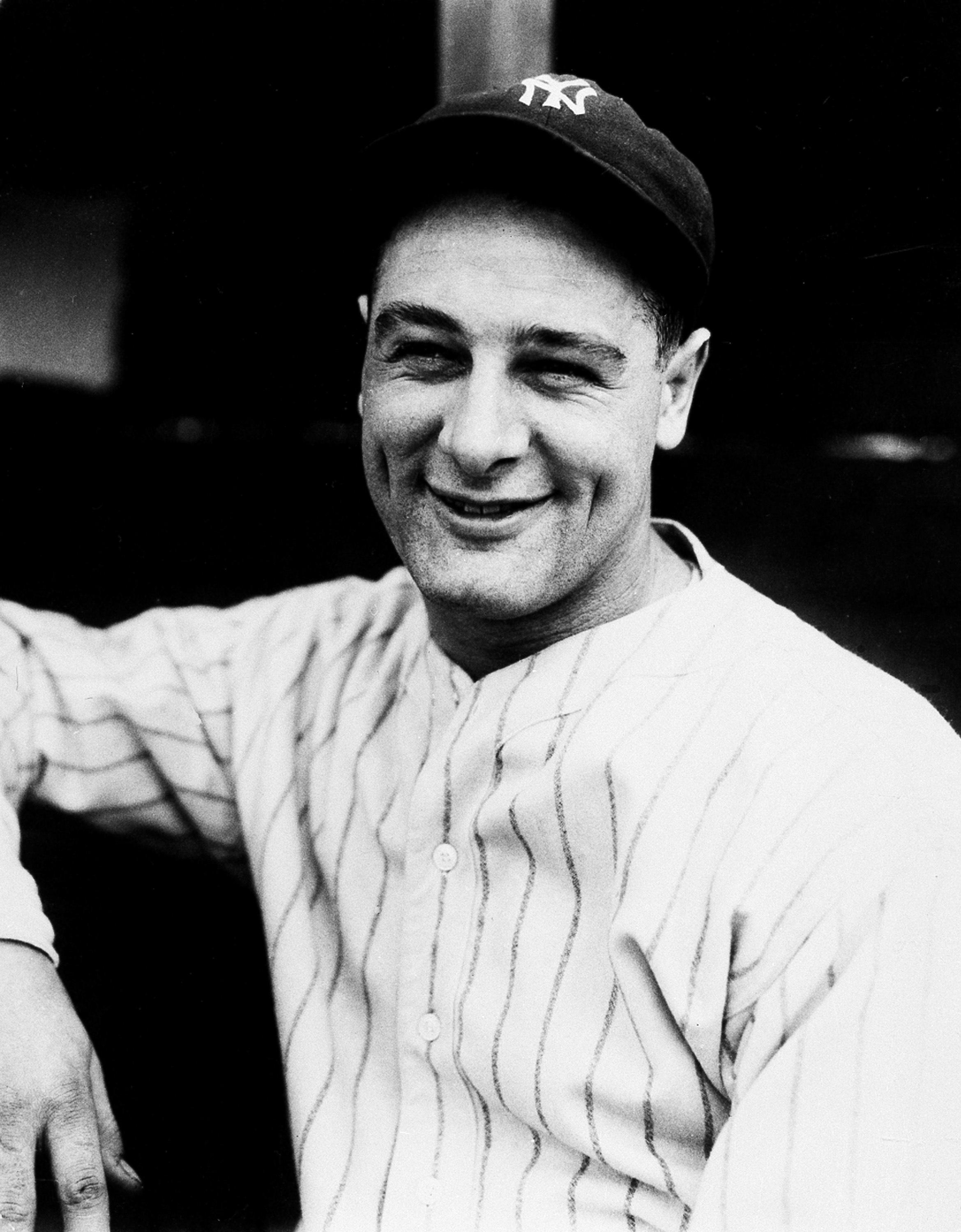
Lou Gehrig held the American League record for 20 years.

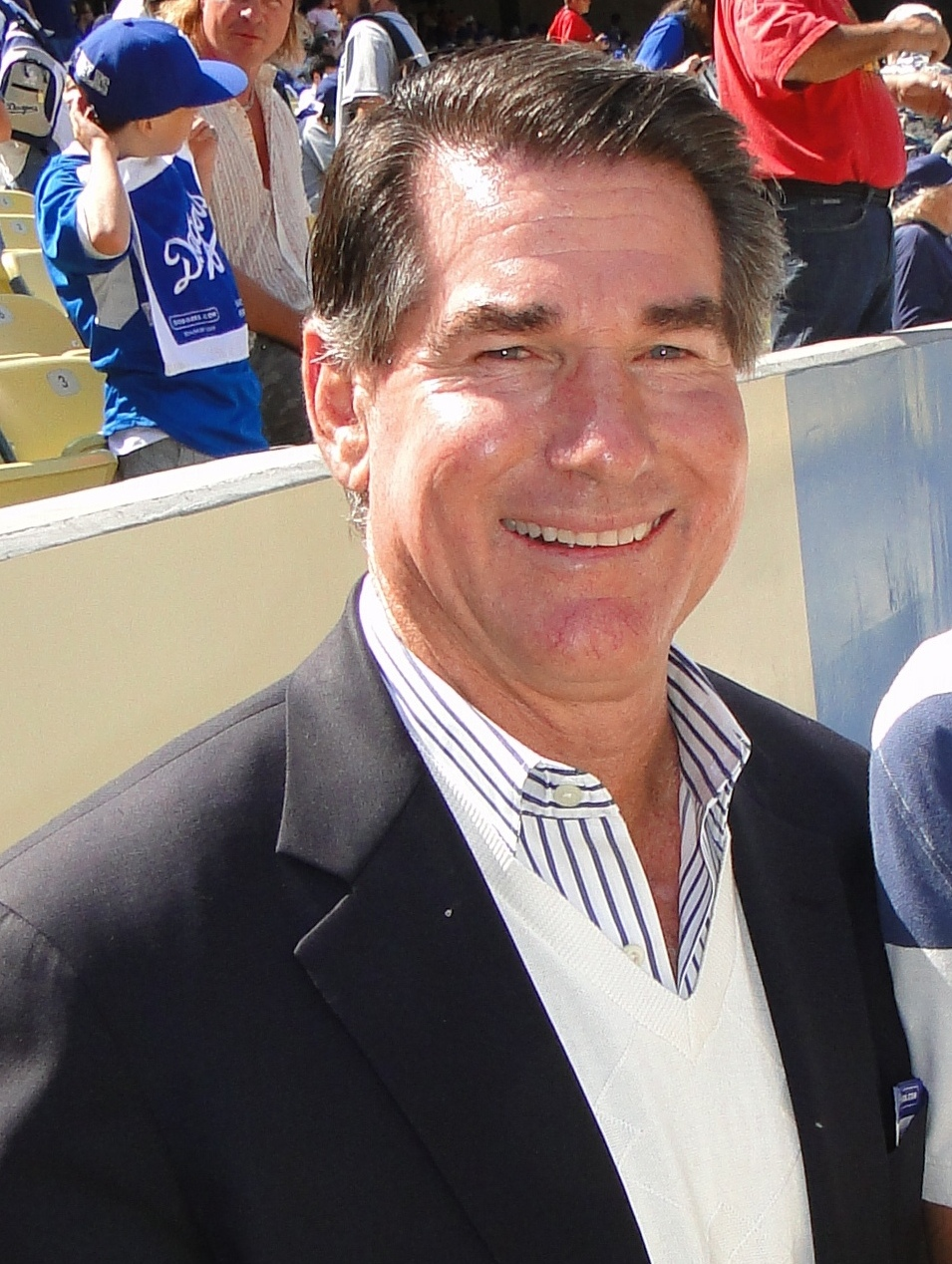
Steve Garvey led the National League in games at first base a record nine times.

- Stats updated as of September 27, 2026.

Rank	Player (2026 Gs)	Games as first baseman			Other leagues, notes
Rank	Player (2026 Gs)	MLB	American League	National League	Other leagues, notes
1	Eddie Murray*	2,413	1,647	766	
2	Jake Beckley*	2,383	0	2,259	Includes 124 in Players' League; held major league record, 1905-1994; holds the record for left-handed first baseman
3	**Freddie Freeman (152)**	2,304	0	2,304	
4	Fred McGriff*	2,239	958	1,281	
5	Mickey Vernon	2,237	2,227	10	
6	Todd Helton*	2,178	0	2,178	
7	Mark Grace	2,162	0	2,162	
8	Cap Anson*	2,152	0	2,059	Includes 93 in National Association; held major league record, 1888-1905; held NL record, 1887-1905; held the major league record for a right-handed first baseman, 1881-1992; held NL record for a right-handed first baseman, 1885-2003
9	Rafael Palmeiro	2,139	2,116	23	
10	Lou Gehrig*	2,137	2,137	0	Held American League record, 1938-1958
11	Charlie Grimm	2,131	0	2,131	
12	Jeff Bagwell*	2,111	0	2,111	Holds NL record for right-handed first baseman
13	Andrés Galarraga	2,106	26	2,080	Held NL record for a right-handed first baseman, 2003-2004
14	Joe Judge	2,084	2,056	28	Held American League record, 1928-1938
15	Ed Konetchy	2,073	0	1,921	Includes 152 in Federal League
16	**Paul Goldschmidt (78)**	2,061	216	1,845	
17	Steve Garvey	2,059	0	2,059	Held NL record for a right-handed first baseman, 1987-2003
18	Joe Kuhel	2,057	2,057	0	
19	John Olerud	2,053	1,590	463	
20	Willie McCovey*	2,045	0	2,045	
21	Albert Pujols	2,026	613	1,413	
22	Keith Hernandez	2,014	42	1,972	
23	Jake Daubert	2,002	0	2,002	
24	Stuffy McInnis	1,995	1,608	387	Held American League record, 1921-1928
25	George Sisler*	1,971	1,592	379	
26	Joey Votto	1,970	0	1,970	
27	Chris Chambliss	1,962	1,252	710	
28	Norm Cash	1,943	1,943	0	
29	Jimmie Foxx*	1,919	1,827	92	Held AL record for a right-handed first baseman, 1940-2013
30	Wally Joyner	1,913	1,376	537	
31	Gil Hodges*	1,908	0	1,908	
32	Paul Konerko	1,904	1,873	31	Holds AL record for right-handed first baseman
33	Derrek Lee	1,901	85	1,816	
34	Will Clark	1,889	715	1,174	
35	Jim Bottomley*	1,885	164	1,721	
36	Tino Martinez	1,869	1,594	275	
37	Adrián González	1,836	292	1,544	
38	Wally Pipp	1,819	1,478	341	
39	Hal Chase	1,815	1,176	423	Includes 216 in Federal League
40	Fred Tenney	1,810	0	1,810	
41	Tony Pérez*	1,778	195	1,583	
42	George Scott	1,773	1,773	0	
43	Mark Teixeira	1,769	1,613	156	
44	Carlos Delgado	1,767	1,168	599	
45	Mark McGwire	1,763	1,251	512	
46	Roger Connor*	1,759	0	1,636	Includes 123 in Players' League; held the record for a left-handed first baseman, 1892-1901
47	Anthony Rizzo	1,699	351	1,348	
48	Eric Karros	1,698	22	1,676	
49	Orlando Cepeda*	1,683	0	1,683	
50	George Burns	1,671	1,671	0	Held American League record, 1928; held AL record for a right-handed first baseman, 1928-1940
51	Tommy Tucker	1,670	0	1,282	Includes 388 in American Association
52	Johnny Mize*	1,667	213	1,454	
53	J. T. Snow	1,656	519	1,137	
54	Dan Brouthers*	1,636	0	1,380	Includes 130 in American Association, 126 in the Players' League
55	Don Mattingly	1,634	1,634	0	
56	Harry Davis	1,628	1,393	235	Held American League record, 1905-1921
57	Eric Hosmer	1,622	1,042	580	
58	Kent Hrbek	1,609	1,609	0	
59	Bill Terry*	1,579	0	1,579	
60	Lu Blue	1,571	1,570	1	
61	Bill Buckner	1,555	553	1,002	
62	Fred Merkle	1,547	6	1,541	
63	George McQuinn	1,529	1,491	38	
64	Lee May	1,507	401	1,106	
65	Joe Adcock	1,501	351	1,150	
66	**Carlos Santana (8)**	1,493	1,194	299	
67	Ted Kluszewski	1,481	134	1,347	
68	Boog Powell	1,479	1,475	4	
69	John Mayberry	1,478	1,394	84	
70	Ryan Howard	1,477	0	1,477	
	Bill White	1,477	0	1,477	
72	Dolph Camilli	1,476	54	1,422	
73	Cecil Cooper	1,475	1,475	0	
74	Adam LaRoche	1,468	52	1,416	
75	Bill Skowron	1,463	1,397	66	
76	Frank McCormick	1,448	0	1,448	
77	Lyle Overbay	1,435	833	602	
78	Earl Torgeson	1,416	448	968	
79	Gus Suhr	1,406	0	1,406	
80	James Loney	1,392	435	957	
81	Elbie Fletcher	1,380	0	1,380	
82	Carlos Peña	1,379	1,226	153	
83	Mike Hargrove	1,378	1,341	37	
84	Dan McGann	1,377	68	1,309	
	Pete O'Brien	1,377	1,377	0	
86	Dan Driessen	1,375	0	1,375	
87	George Kelly*	1,373	0	1,373	
88	Charles Comiskey*	1,363	0	267	Includes 1,008 in American Association, 88 in the Players' League
89	**Matt Olson (162)**	1,358	548	810	
90	Fred Luderus	1,326	0	1,326	
91	Prince Fielder	1,324	376	948	
	Justin Morneau	1,324	1,124	200	
93	Hal Trosky	1,321	1,321	0	
94	Jason Thompson	1,314	649	665	
95	Sean Casey	1,313	228	1,085	
	Jack Fournier	1,313	320	993	
97	Jason Giambi	1,307	1,229	78	
98	Mo Vaughn	1,305	1,147	158	
99	Ed Kranepool	1,304	0	1,304	
	Vic Power	1,304	1,287	17	

== Other Hall of Famers ==
Player	Games as the first baseman			Other leagues, notes
Player	MLB	American League	National League	Other leagues, notes
Ernie Banks*	1,259	0	1,259	
Rod Carew*	1,184	1,184	0	
Hank Greenberg*	1,138	1,019	119	
Jim Thome*	1,106	760	346	
Stan Musial*	1,016	0	1,016	
Frank Chance*	997	8	989	
Frank Thomas*	971	971	0	
Harmon Killebrew*	969	969	0	
Willie Stargell*	848	0	848	
Dick Allen*	807	385	422	
Joe Torre*	787	0	787	
Carl Yastrzemski*	765	765	0	
Ben Taylor*	611	0	0	Includes 293 in Eastern Colored League, 286 in Negro National League (first), 32 in American Negro League (incomplete)
Joe Mauer*	603	603	0	
Buck Leonard*	585	0	0	Includes 585 in Negro National League (second) (incomplete)
Mule Suttles*	575	0	0	Includes 318 in Negro National League (first), 205 in Negro National League (second), 52 in East–West League (incomplete)
George Brett*	461	461	0	
Harry Heilmann*	448	423	25	
Jud Wilson*	403	0	0	Includes 202 in Negro National League (second), 148 in Eastern Colored League, 53 in American Negro League (incomplete)
Buck O'Neil*	347	0	0	Includes 347 in Negro American League (incomplete)
Hughie Jennings*	331	3	311	Includes 17 in American Association
Frank Robinson*	305	77	228	
Oscar Charleston*	291	0	0	Includes 208 in Negro National League (second), 57 in Negro National League (first), 10 in American Negro League, 9 in Eastern Colored League, 7 in Negro American League (incomplete)
Joe Kelley*	291	5	286	
Nap Lajoie*	286	138	148	
David Ortiz*	278	278	0	
Ed Delahanty*	271	14	256	Includes 1 in Players' League
Mickey Mantle*	262	262	0	
Buck Ewing*	253	0	253	
Honus Wagner *	248	0	248	
Jim O'Rourke*	214	0	103	Includes 111 in National Association
Jackie Robinson*	198	0	197	Includes 1 in Negro American League (incomplete)
Paul Molitor*	197	197	0	
Ted Simmons*	195	69	126	
Deacon White*	133	0	74	Includes 57 in the Players' League, 2 in National Association
Jeff Kent*	117	23	94	
Martín Dihigo*	80	0	0	Includes 57 in Eastern Colored League, 18 in American Negro League, 5 in Negro National League (second) (incomplete)
Dave Parker*	19	4	15	
Andruw Jones*	8	8	0	
Carlos Beltrán*	1	1	0	
