= List of Toronto Blue Jays owners and executives =

== Majority owners ==
Name	Years
Labatt Brewing Company	1976–1995
Interbrew	1995–2000
Rogers Communications	2000–present

== Presidents and CEOs ==
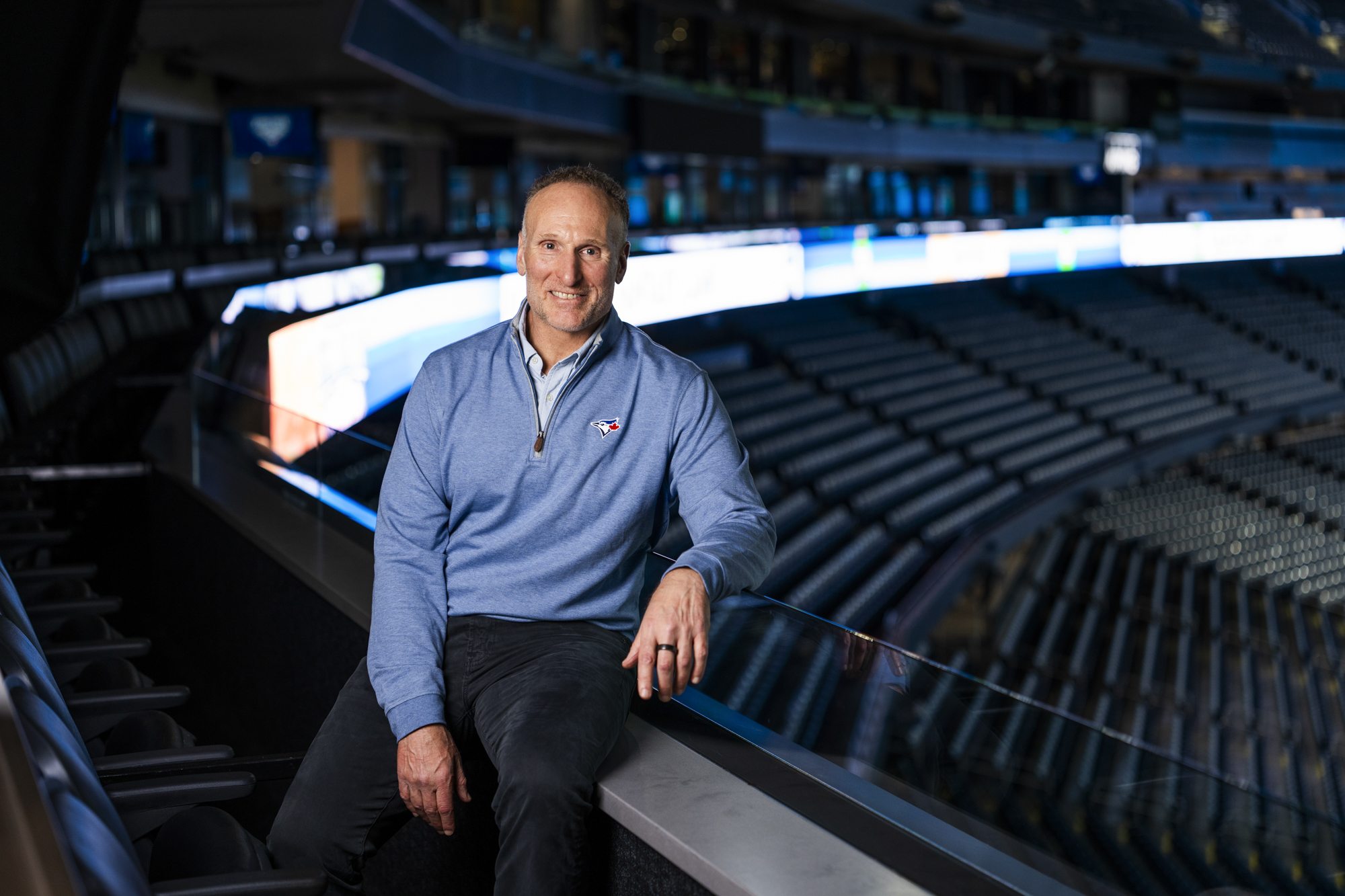
Current CEO and President Mark Shapiro

Name	Years
Peter Bavasi	1977–1981
Peter Hardy	1982-1989
Paul Beeston	1989-1997
Sam Pollock	1998-1999
Paul Godfrey	2000-2008
Paul Beeston	2008–2015
Mark Shapiro	2015–present

== General Managers ==
Name	Years
Peter Bavasi	1977
Pat Gillick	1978–1994
Gord Ash	1995–2001
J. P. Ricciardi	2002–2009
Alex Anthopoulos^{1}	2010–2015
Tony LaCava (interim)	2015
Ross Atkins	2015–present

== Other executives ==
- Jim Fanning
- Karl Kuehl
- Keith Law
- Jim Lett
- Ted Rogers
- Billy Smith
- Dave Stewart
- James Click

== Notes ==
1. On October 29, 2015, Anthopoulos reported that he would not return as general manager next season.
