= Cristian Pache =

Dominican baseball player (born 1998)

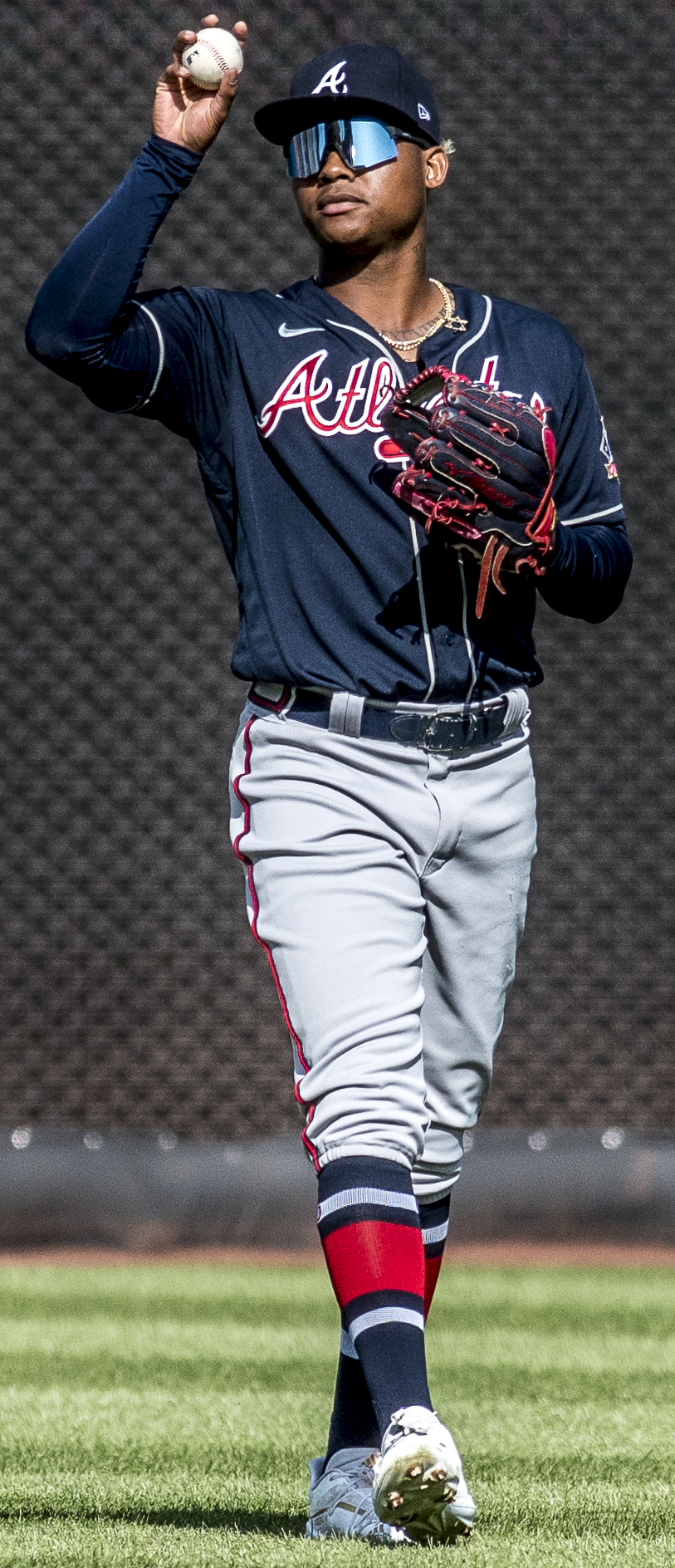
- Pache with the Atlanta Braves in 2021

Free agent
- Outfielder
- Born: November 19, 1998 (age 27); Santo Domingo Centro, Dominican Republic
- Bats: Right Throws: Right

MLB debut
- August 21, 2020, for the Atlanta Braves

MLB statistics (through 2026 season)
- Batting average: .181
- Home runs: 7
- Runs batted in: 49
- Stats at Baseball Reference

Teams
- Atlanta Braves (2020–2021); Oakland Athletics (2022); Philadelphia Phillies (2023–2024); Baltimore Orioles (2024); Miami Marlins (2024); New York Mets (2026)

Cristian Rafael Pache (/ˈpɑːtʃeɪ/ PAH-chay; born November 19, 1998) is a Dominican professional baseball outfielder who is a free agent. He has previously played in MLB for the Atlanta Braves, Oakland Athletics, Philadelphia Phillies, Baltimore Orioles, Miami Marlins, and New York Mets.

== Early life ==
Pache, the second of three children, was born in Santo Domingo Centro in the Dominican Republic to a factory worker and a homemaker.

== Career ==
=== Atlanta Braves ===
==== Minor leagues ====
Pache signed with the Atlanta Braves in July 2015 for $1.4 million. At the time of his signing, Baseball America ranked Pache the 21st-best international free agent; MLB.com ranked him tenth. Pache was assigned to the Gulf Coast League Braves in June 2016, and after batting .283 with 11 runs batted in (RBI) in 27 games. Pache was promoted to the Danville Braves, where he finished the season with a .333 batting average, ten RBI, and a .775 on-base plus slugging (OPS) in 30 games.

Pache spent the 2017 season with the Rome Braves, where he batted .281 with 42 RBI and 32 stolen bases in 119 games. He was named a South Atlantic League All-Star at midseason.

Pache was named to MLB Pipeline's All-Defensive team for 2018, and was invited to spring training at the start of the 2018 season. He was subsequently assigned to the Florida Fire Frogs. In June, Pache received a Florida State League All-Star selection. At the A-Advanced level, he played in 93 games, driving in 40 runs, hitting eight home runs, and recording a .285 batting average. On August 1, Pache was promoted to the Mississippi Braves. In 29 games for Mississippi, he hit .260 with one home run and seven RBI in 29 games. In August 2018, it was announced that Pache was placed on the preliminary Arizona Fall League (AFL) roster. He hit .290/.318/.387 through 14 games, and was named to the AFL All-Star Game. As a prospect, Pache drew attention for his defensive skills. Throughout 2018, he began displaying an increased ability to hit for power.

Pache was named to the 2019 MLB Pipeline's All-Defensive team. He spent time in major league camp prior to the start of the 2019 season, and was subsequently reassigned to Mississippi. At midseason, Pache was named to the All-Star Futures Game. While playing in the Southern League, Pache hit for a .278 batting average, with 28 doubles, eight triples, 11 home runs, 50 runs, 53 runs batted in, and eight stolen bases. On August 6, 2019, Pache made his International League debut with the Gwinnett Stripers. Over 130 games between both clubs, Pache batted .277/.340/.462 with 12 home runs and 61 RBI.

==== Major leagues (2020–2021) ====
The Braves added Pache to their 40-man roster following the 2019 season to protect him from becoming eligible to be selected in the Rule 5 draft. Prior to the 2020 season, MLB.com ranked Pache the eleventh-best prospect in Minor League Baseball. In 2020, he was invited to the Braves' spring training for the second time, and was eventually assigned to Gwinnett. The 2020 Minor League Baseball season was cancelled due to the COVID-19 pandemic, and Pache spent time at the Braves' alternate training site when the season resumed. He was promoted to the major league roster on August 18, 2020. Pache's MLB debut came against the Philadelphia Phillies, on August 21, 2020, as the starting left fielder. That night, he registered his first big league hit, a single off left-hander Cole Irvin. In limited action during the 2020 regular season, Pache went one-for-four at the plate.

Pache was named to the roster for the 2020 NL Wild Card Series. He scored the game-winning run in the bottom of the 13th inning in Game 1 for the Braves. Pache had entered the game as a pinch runner, then scored on a hit by Freddie Freeman. Pache replaced Adam Duvall in the second inning of Game 1 of the 2020 National League Championship Series. In Game 2, Pache notched his first career major league RBI and his first career big league home run, in Game 3.

Prior to the start of the 2021 regular season, Pache began wearing uniform number 25 to honor former Braves center fielder Andruw Jones. Pache had worn the number throughout his minor league career, but the number was unavailable at the time of Pache's major league debut, as it was being worn by catcher Tyler Flowers. Pache hit his first regular season home run, a grand slam, while facing Tommy Milone in a game against the Toronto Blue Jays on May 1, 2021. On May 14, the Braves placed Pache on the injured list due to a hamstring injury that he suffered during a game against the Toronto Blue Jays. On May 29, Pache was sent to Gwinnett to complete a minor league rehabilitation assignment. On June 2, the Braves activated Pache and immediately optioned him back to Gwinnett. Pache spent the remainder of the minor league season there. He hit .265 with 11 home runs, 44 RBIs and 9 stolen bases. For the Braves, he batted .111 in 63 at bats.

On October 12, 2021, Pache was placed on the Braves postseason roster, replacing Jorge Soler, who had tested positive for COVID-19 before game four of the National League Division Series against the Milwaukee Brewers. The Braves continued to carry Pache on their roster as they advanced to the National League Championship Series against the Los Angeles Dodgers. However, he was removed on October 21 when Soler was deemed eligible to return to the team. The Braves eventually won the 2021 World Series, giving the Braves their first title since 1995.

=== Oakland Athletics ===
On March 14, 2022, the Braves traded Pache, Shea Langeliers, Ryan Cusick, and Joey Estes to the Oakland Athletics in exchange for Matt Olson. He started in center field for the Athletics on Opening Day, but was optioned to the Las Vegas Aviators on June 30. In 2022 with the Athletics, he played in 91 games, had a slash line of .166/.218/.241 and batted in 18 runs.

On March 27, 2023, manager Mark Kotsay announced that Pache, who was out of options, had not made the Opening Day roster.

=== Philadelphia Phillies ===
On March 29, 2023, the Athletics traded Pache to the Philadelphia Phillies in exchange for Billy Sullivan. In 18 games to begin the year, Pache hit .360/.360/.600 with a .960 OPS and one home run before he suffered a torn meniscus. He was given an expected 4–6 week recovery timetable after undergoing surgery on May 1. He hit his second home run as a Phillie on July 7, a game winner in the 9th with 2 outs against the Miami Marlins. On July 16, it was announced that Pache would undergo surgery to remove a screw from his elbow. Manager Rob Thomson said that Pache would miss "a few weeks" as a result. In 48 games, he batted .238/.319/.417 with two home runs, 11 RBI, and two stolen bases.

Pache played in 50 games for Philadelphia in 2024, slashing .202/.288/.269 with no home runs and nine RBI.

=== Baltimore Orioles ===
On July 26, 2024, Pache was traded to the Baltimore Orioles alongside Seranthony Domínguez in exchange for Austin Hays. He appeared in three games for Baltimore, logging a single in his only at–bat. Pache was designated for assignment by the Orioles on August 1.

=== Miami Marlins ===
On August 2, 2024, Pache was claimed off waivers by the Miami Marlins. In 35 games for Miami, he slashed .183/.234/.283 with one home run, seven RBI, and one stolen base. Pache was designated for assignment by the Marlins on September 24. He cleared waivers and was sent outright to the Triple–A Jacksonville Jumbo Shrimp the next day. Pache elected free agency on October 1.

=== Arizona Diamondbacks ===
On December 19, 2024, Pache signed a minor league contract with the Arizona Diamondbacks. He made 70 appearances for the Triple-A Reno Aces in 2025, batting .251/.351/.389 with five home runs, 25 RBI, and eight stolen bases. Pache elected free agency following the season on November 6, 2025.

=== New York Mets ===
On December 15, 2025, Pache signed a minor league contract with the New York Mets. He made 93 appearances for the Triple–A Syracuse Mets, batting .232/.289/.356 with five home runs, 41 RBI, and 16 stolen bases. On August 4, 2026, the Mets selected Pache's contract, adding him to their active roster. On October 29, he was designated for assignment to create room for Kyren Paris. On November 1, he cleared waivers and was sent outright to Triple-A Syracuse Mets. He elected free agency on November 2.
