= Ryan Cusick =

American baseball player (born 1999)

Philadelphia Phillies
- Pitcher
- Born: November 12, 1999 (age 26); Sudbury, Massachusetts, U.S.
- Bats: Right Throws: Right

Ryan Cusick (born November 12, 1999) is an American professional baseball pitcher in the Philadelphia Phillies organization. He played college baseball for the Wake Forest Demon Deacons.

== Amateur career ==
Cusick began his high school career at Lincoln-Sudbury Regional High School in Sudbury, Massachusetts before transferring to Avon Old Farms School in Avon, Connecticut, for his senior year in 2018. He was selected by the Cincinnati Reds in the 40th round of the 2018 Major League Baseball draft, but did not sign and instead enrolled at Wake Forest University where he played college baseball.

In 2019, Cusick's freshman season, he led the Wake Forest pitching staff in wins, going 7–3 with a 6.44 ERA over 65 2/3 innings. That summer, he played in the Cape Cod Baseball League with the Bourne Braves. He pitched 22 1/3 innings in 2020 before the remainder of the season was cancelled due to the COVID-19 pandemic. As a junior in 2021, Cusick started 12 games and compiled a 3–5 record, a 4.24 ERA, and 108 strikeouts over seventy innings.

== Professional career ==
=== Atlanta Braves ===
Cusick was selected by the Atlanta Braves in the first round with the 24th overall selection of the 2021 Major League Baseball draft. He signed with the Braves for a $2.7 million signing bonus. To begin his professional career, he was assigned to the Augusta GreenJackets of the Low-A East. During his first year in the minor leagues, Cusick pitched 16 1/3 innings, striking out 34 batters, walking four, and giving up five earned runs. Cusick joined the Braves' minor league camp before the 2022 season began.

=== Oakland Athletics ===
On March 14, 2022, the Braves traded Cusick, Cristian Pache, Shea Langeliers, and Joey Estes to the Oakland Athletics in exchange for Matt Olson. He was assigned to the Midland RockHounds of the Double-A Texas League for the 2022 season. Over 13 games (ten starts), he went 1–6 with a 7.12 ERA, 46 strikeouts, and thirty walks over 43 innings. He was selected to play in the Arizona Fall League for the Mesa Solar Sox after the season. Cusick returned to Midland to open the 2023 season.

Cusick split the 2024 campaign between the rookie–level Arizona Complex League Athletics, Midland, and the Triple–A Las Vegas Aviators, posting a cumulative 3–4 record and 4.66 ERA with 66 strikeouts and four saves across 63 2/3 innings pitched. Following the season, the Athletics added Cusick to their 40-man roster to protect him from the Rule 5 draft.

Cusick was optioned to Triple-A Las Vegas to begin the 2025 season. In 13 appearances for the Aviators, he struggled to a 6.75 ERA with 11 strikeouts across 14 2/3 innings pitched. Cusick was designated for assignment by the Athletics on May 27, 2025.

=== Detroit Tigers ===
On May 30, 2025, Cusick was claimed off waivers by the Detroit Tigers. Cusick made one scoreless appearance for the Triple-A Toledo Mud Hens before Detroit designated him for assignment on June 2.

=== Philadelphia Phillies ===
On June 4, 2025, Cusick was claimed off waivers by the Chicago White Sox. He did not appear for the organization, and was designated for assignment following the promotion of Kyle Teel on June 6.

On June 8, 2025, Cusick was claimed off waivers by the Philadelphia Phillies. In six appearances for the Triple-A Lehigh Valley IronPigs, he struggled to a 12.86 ERA with five strikeouts over seven innings of work. Cusick was designated for assignment by Philadelphia on July 26. He cleared waivers and was sent outright to Triple-A Lehigh Valley on July 28. He pitched in a total of 19 games (four starts) for Lehigh Valley and ended the season with a 2–0 record, a 7.90 ERA, and 35 strikeouts across 27 1/3 innings. Cusick returned to Lehigh Valley for the 2026 season. He appeared in 33 games (10 starts) and went 1–7 with a 7.23 ERA, 77 strikeouts, and 62 walks over 79 2/3 innings.
