= Joey Estes =

American baseball player (born 2001)

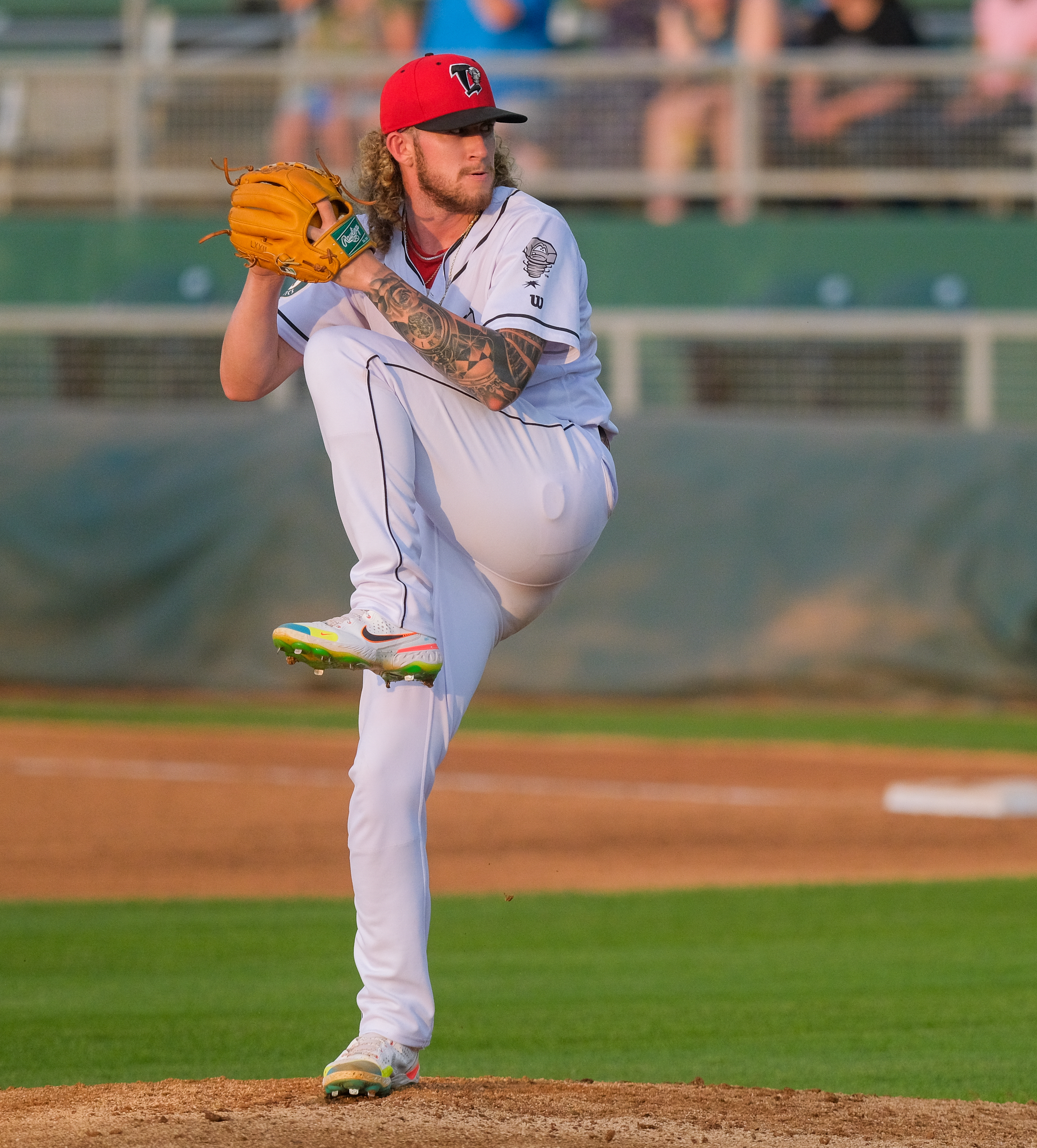
- Estes pitching for the Lansing Lugnuts in 2022

Free agent
- Pitcher
- Born: October 8, 2001 (age 25); Palmdale, California, U.S.
- Bats: Right Throws: Right

MLB debut
- September 20, 2023, for the Oakland Athletics

MLB statistics (through 2026 season)
- Win–loss record: 7–12
- Earned run average: 5.77
- Strikeouts: 110
- Stats at Baseball Reference

Teams
- Oakland Athletics / Athletics (2023–2026)

Joseph Lee Estes (born October 8, 2001) is an American professional baseball pitcher who is a free agent. He has previously played in Major League Baseball (MLB) for the Oakland Athletics / Athletics. He made his MLB debut in 2023.

== Amateur career ==
Estes attended Paraclete High School in Lancaster, California. As a freshman in 2016, he compiled a 1.05 ERA, and as a sophomore, he went 9–1 with a 0.31 ERA over ninety innings. In 2019, as a senior, he went 8–0 with a 0.91 ERA and 124 strikeouts. He was selected by the Atlanta Braves in the 16th round of the 2019 Major League Baseball draft. He signed, forgoing his commitment to play college baseball at Long Beach State University.

== Professional career ==
=== Atlanta Braves ===
Estes made his professional debut with the Rookie-level Gulf Coast League Braves with whom he gave up nine earned runs over ten innings. He did not play a game in 2020 after the minor league season was cancelled due to the COVID-19 pandemic. Estes spent the 2021 season with the Augusta GreenJackets of the Low-A East, starting twenty games and pitching to a 3–6 record, a 2.91 ERA, and 127 strikeouts over 99 innings. His .181 batting average against was ninth in the minor leagues. He was named the league's Pitcher of the Week twice during the season, and was named the league's Pitcher of the Year following the season's end.

=== Oakland Athletics ===
On March 14, 2022, the Braves traded Estes, Shea Langeliers, Ryan Cusick, and Cristian Pache to the Oakland Athletics in exchange for Matt Olson. He was assigned to the Lansing Lugnuts of the High-A Midwest League for the 2022 season. Over twenty starts, he went 3-7 with a 4.55 ERA and 92 strikeouts over 91 innings. To open the 2023 season, he was assigned to the Midland RockHounds of the Double-A Texas League. In early August, he was promoted to the Las Vegas Aviators of the Triple-A Pacific Coast League. In 27 games (23 starts) between the two affiliates, Estes posted a cumulative 9–6 record and 3.74 ERA with 131 strikeouts in 137 innings of work.

On September 20, 2023, Estes was selected to the 40-man roster and promoted to the major leagues for the first time. He made his MLB debut that night as Oakland's starting pitcher and pitched 4 2/3 innings in which he allowed six runs (five earned) on six hits and one walk while recording two strikeouts. Across two starts for Oakland, Estes surrendered nine runs (eight earned), 12 hits with seven strikeouts over 10 innings pitched.

Estes was optioned to Las Vegas to begin the 2024 season. He made six starts with Las Vegas, going 2-3 with a 6.04 ERA. He was recalled by Oakland in May and recorded his first MLB win on May 11 after pitching five innings in which he allowed one run on two hits and no walks in an 8-1 Athletics win against the Seattle Mariners. On July 3, he threw a complete-game shutout against the Los Angeles Angels, striking out four batters and issuing one walk in the 5–0 victory. Across 25 games (24 starts) with the Athletics, Estes went 7-9 with a 5.01 ERA and 92 strikeouts.

Estes was named the final starter in the Athletics starting rotation to begin the 2025 season. He gave up six runs in each of his first two starts and was subsequently optioned to Las Vegas. On August 17, while playing for Las Vegas, Estes threw a fastball at the shoulder of Victor Robles of the Tacoma Rainiers. Robles, on a rehab assignment, had been hit by four Aviators pitchers that week, including Estes on August 12; Estes also hit Robles while playing for Oakland on September 5, 2024. Robles reacted to this repeated behavior by throwing his bat at Estes. At the time, he had hit a total of 28 batters in nearly 100 appearances in the minors. Estes was recalled by the Athletics on August 22 and made one appearance. With the Athletics, Estes made three appearances (two starts) and went 0–2 with a 9.82 ERA over 11 innings. He made 15 starts for Las Vegas and pitched to a 5.51 ERA over 80 innings. On September 18, Estes underwent surgery to address a herniated disc in his lower back, ending his season.

Estes was optioned to Las Vegas to open the 2026 season. He was recalled by the Athletics in June and made a spot start for the team before he was optioned back to Las Vegas. Estes was recalled once again on September 4, before being optioned to Las Vegas for a final time on September 13. With the Athletics, he pitched in a total of two games, and gave up nine earned runs over 7 1/3 innings. Estes played a majority of the 2026 season with Las Vegas with whom he made 20 starts and had a 4–7 record, a 6.50 ERA, and 67 strikeouts over 91 1/3 innings. On October 29, he was sent outright to Triple-A Las Vegas Aviators. He elected free agency on November 2.
