= Shea Langeliers =

American baseball player (born 1997)

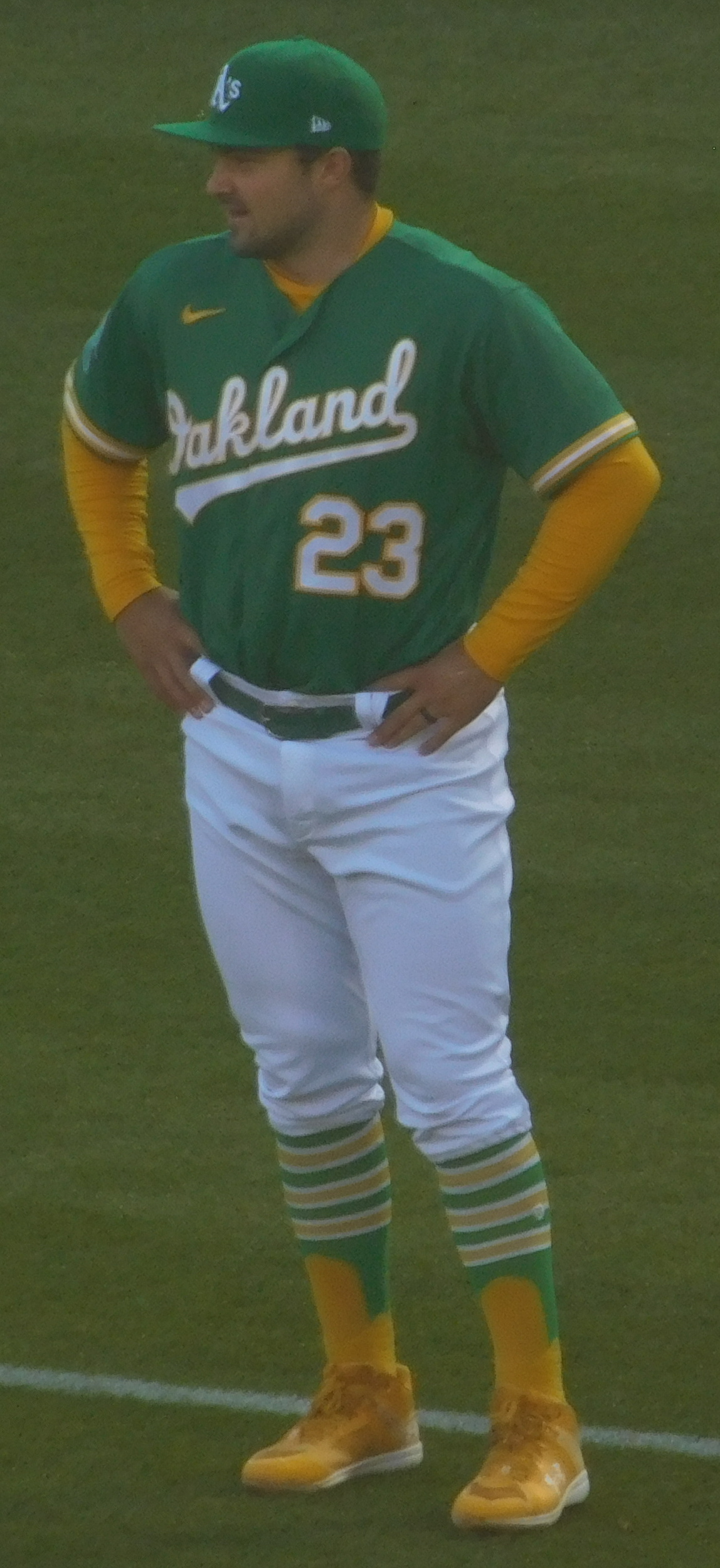
- Langeliers with the Athletics in 2023

Athletics – No. 23
- Catcher
- Born: November 18, 1997 (age 28); Portland, Oregon, U.S.
- Bats: Right Throws: Right

MLB debut
- August 16, 2022, for the Oakland Athletics

MLB statistics (through 2026 season)
- Batting average: .240
- Home runs: 111
- Runs batted in: 295
- Stats at Baseball Reference

Teams
- Oakland Athletics / Athletics (2022–present)

Career highlights and awards
- All-Star (2026)

Shea Ryan Langeliers (born November 18, 1997) is an American professional baseball catcher for the Athletics of Major League Baseball (MLB). He made his MLB debut in 2022. He played college baseball for the Baylor Bears. Langeliers was named to his first All-Star game in 2026.

== Early life and amateur career ==
Langeliers' parents, Steve and Annie, were fans of the New York Mets, and named Langeliers after the Mets' home park, Shea Stadium. His father encouraged him to play catcher, feeling it was the best opportunity for him to succeed in the sport.

Langeliers attended Keller High School in Keller, Texas. He began catching as a high school sophomore. As a senior in 2016, Langeliers batted .369 with six home runs and 31 runs batted in (RBI). He was drafted by the Toronto Blue Jays in the 34th round of the 2016 Major League Baseball draft, but did not sign and instead chose to attend Baylor University to play college baseball for the Baylor Bears.

As a freshman at Baylor in 2017, Langeliers batted .313 with ten home runs and 38 RBI in 55 games. He was a unanimous selection to the All-Big 12 Conference Freshman Team as well as being named to the All-Big 12 Second Team. He spent that summer playing in the Cape Cod Baseball League for the Chatham Anglers where he was named an All-Star. In 2018, as a sophomore, Langeliers missed time at the beginning of the season due to a wrist injury. However, he returned, and finished the year batting .252 with 11 home runs and 44 RBI in 58 games. He was named to the All-Big 12 First Team along with winning a Rawlings/ABCA Division I Gold Glove, becoming only the second player in Baylor history to win the award. Langeliers played for the USA Baseball Collegiate National Team that summer.

In 2019, his junior season, he was named to the All-Big 12 First Team for the second consecutive year despite missing three weeks due to a broken hand. In an elimination game during the 2019 NCAA Division I baseball tournament, he hit three home runs and had 11 RBI in Baylor's 24–6 win over Nebraska-Omaha. Langeliers finished his junior year hitting .308 with ten home runs and 42 RBI in 44 games.

== Professional career ==
=== Atlanta Braves ===
Langeliers was considered one of the top prospects for the 2019 Major League Baseball draft. He was selected by the Atlanta Braves with the ninth overall pick. He signed with the team for $4 million. He began his professional career with the Rome Braves of the Single-A South Atlantic League, spending all of the 2019 season there. Over 54 games, Langeliers hit .255/.310/.343 with two home runs and 34 RBI.

Langeliers did not play in a game in 2020 due to the cancellation of the minor league season because of the COVID-19 pandemic. In 2021, he spent a majority of the season with the Mississippi Braves of the Double-A South, slashing .258/.338/.498 with 22 home runs and 52 RBI over 92 games. Following the end of Mississippi's season, he joined the Gwinnett Stripers of the Triple-A West for their final homestand. He was named Atlanta's Minor League Player of the Year. He was selected to play in the Arizona Fall League for the Peoria Javelinas after the season.

=== Oakland Athletics / Athletics ===
On March 14, 2022, the Braves traded Langeliers, Cristian Pache, Ryan Cusick, and Joey Estes to the Oakland Athletics in exchange for Matt Olson. He was assigned to the Las Vegas Aviators of the Triple-A Pacific Coast League to begin the regular season. Langeliers was selected to represent the Athletics at the 2022 All-Star Futures Game. He hit a solo home run and was named the game's most valuable player. Langeliers played in 92 games for Las Vegas and batted .283 with 19 home runs and 56 RBI.

On August 16, 2022, Langeliers was promoted to the major leagues for the first time. He made his MLB debut that night against the Texas Rangers - the team for which he rooted growing up - and collected his first major league hit that night, a double, on the first pitch he saw as a batter. He hit his first MLB home run the next night, a two-run home run, off of Josh Sborz of the Rangers. Langeliers appeared in 14 games for Oakland and hit .218 with six home runs and 22 RBI.

Langeliers opened the 2023 season on Oakland's Opening Day roster and was named the team's starting catcher. He played in 135 games for the team and batted .205 with 22 home runs and 63 RBI.

Langeliers returned as Oakland's starting catcher for the 2024 season. On April 9, 2024, Langeliers hit three home runs and drove in all four runs, including the go-ahead two-run home run in the ninth inning against Texas Rangers en route to a 4-3 victory. During a doubleheader on May 8 against the Rangers, Langeliers drove in a career high of five runs in the first game and three in the second for a total of eight RBI on the day. On August 5, 2025, Langeliers went 5-for-6, three home runs, and three RBI against the Washington Nationals. With his performance, Langeliers became the first player in Major League history (since at least 1900) to have three home runs in his first game hitting leadoff, the second catcher to hit three homers as a leadoff hitter (Travis d'Arnaud on July 15, 2019), the fourth catcher with multiple career three-homer games (d'Arnaud, Gary Carter, and Johnny Bench), and his 15 total bases are tied for the most by a catcher in a game (since at least 1900). For the season, Langeliers played in 137 games and batted .224 with 29 home runs and 80 RBI.

Langeliers missed close to a month due to a strained oblique during the 2025 season with the Athletics, and the team's first season at Sutter Health Park in West Sacramento. He still appeared in 123 games and hit .277 with 31 home runs, 72 RBI, and 32 doubles.

Langeliers began the 2026 season as the Athletics' starting catcher, eventually being named to his first career All–Star game; in 93 games for the club, he slashed .263/.332/.497 with 23 home runs and 51 RBI. On July 26, 2026, Langeliers was placed on the injured list due to a torn meniscus, which was described as a potentially season–ending malady. He underwent surgery to address the injury the following day.

== Personal life ==
Langeliers majored in engineering while at Baylor, where he was an honors student.

Awards
| Preceded by Nick Kurtz | American League Player of the Month; August 2025 | Succeeded by Aaron Judge |
