= Matt Olson =

American baseball player (born 1994)

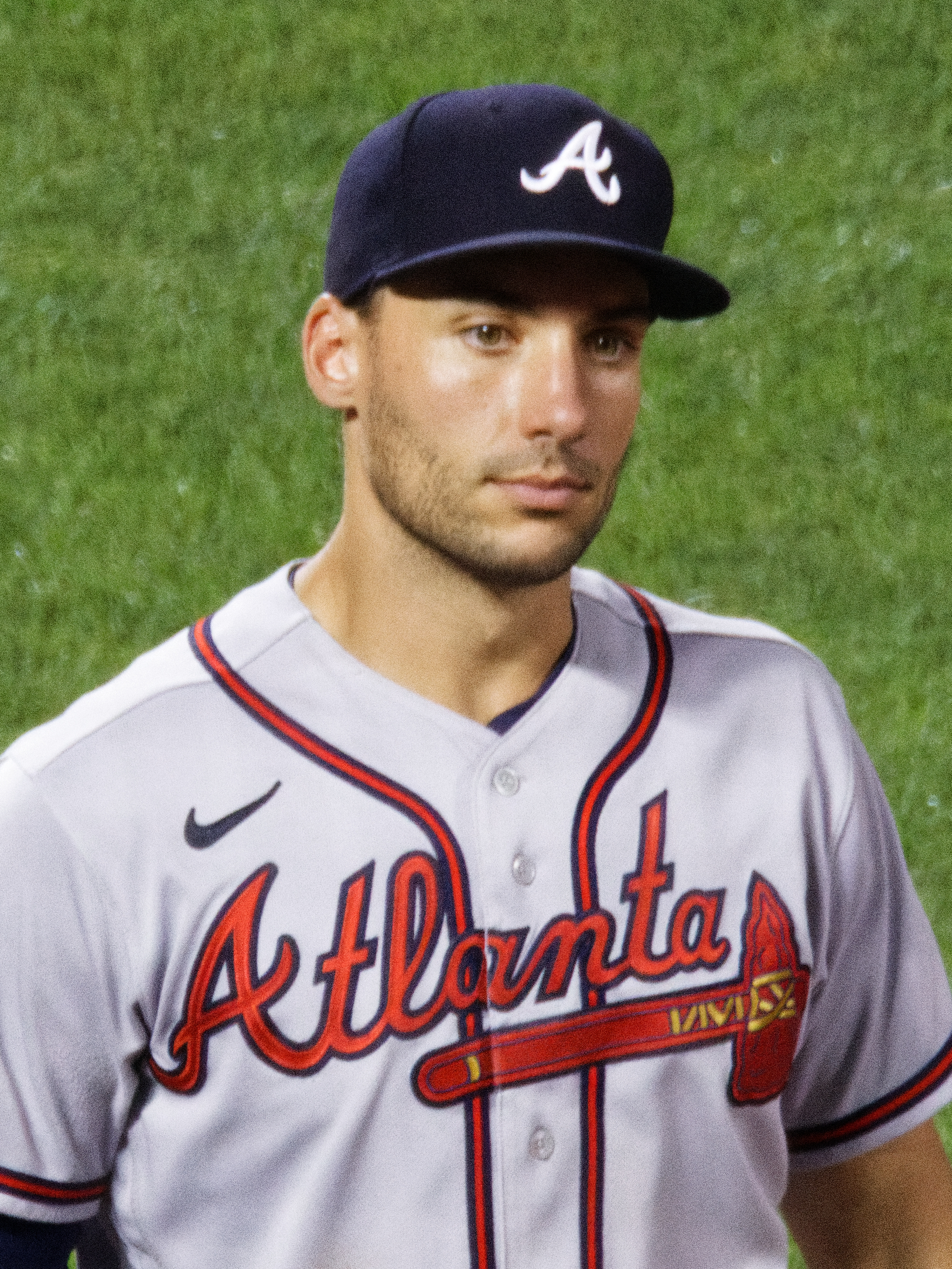
- Olson with the Atlanta Braves in 2022

Atlanta Braves – No. 28
- First baseman
- Born: March 29, 1994 (age 32); Atlanta, Georgia, U.S.
- Bats: Left Throws: Right

MLB debut
- September 12, 2016, for the Oakland Athletics

MLB statistics (through 2026 season)
- Batting average: .256
- Home runs: 329
- Runs batted in: 901
- Stats at Baseball Reference

Teams
- Oakland Athletics (2016–2021); Atlanta Braves (2022–present)

Career highlights and awards
- 4× All-Star (2021, 2023, 2025, 2026); 4× Gold Glove Award (2018, 2019, 2025, 2026); 2× Silver Slugger Award (2023, 2026); NL home run leader (2023); NL RBI leader (2023)

Matthew Kent Olson (born March 29, 1994) is an American professional baseball first baseman for the Atlanta Braves of Major League Baseball (MLB). He has previously played in MLB for the Oakland Athletics.

Olson was drafted by the Athletics in the first round of the 2012 MLB draft and made his MLB debut with them in 2016. After six seasons with the Athletics, he was traded to the Braves prior to the 2022 season and signed an eight-year contract extension. Olson has won four Gold Glove Awards, two Silver Slugger Awards, six Fielding Bible Awards, led the MLB in home runs and RBIs in 2023, and was an MLB All-Star in 2021, 2023, 2025, and 2026.

== Early life ==
Matthew Kent Olson was born on March 29, 1994, in Atlanta, Georgia, and is the second son of Scott and Lee Olson. Scott Olson served as his sons' youth baseball coach, until high school. Matt Olson's older brother, Zack, later pitched for the Harvard Crimson. Matt Olson attended Parkview High School in Lilburn, Georgia, where he played first base and pitched for the Parkview Panthers, leading them to back-to-back state championships in 2011 and 2012. Olson finished his high school career with a .431 batting average, 44 doubles, 45 home runs, 168 runs batted in (RBIs), and a fielding percentage over 0.980. He holds the Parkview High School and Gwinnett County records for wins and RBIs. His uniform number, No. 21, was retired by Parkview High School in February 2019.

== Professional career ==
=== Draft and minor leagues ===
After graduating from high school with honors in 2012, Olson was drafted by the Oakland Athletics in the first round of the 2012 Major League Baseball draft. He had committed to play college baseball at Vanderbilt University, but ultimately decided to forgo his commitment to the Commodores and signed with Oakland.

Olson made his professional debut that season with the Arizona League Athletics and also played for the Vermont Lake Monsters that first season. In total, he played in 50 games and hit .282/.352/.521 with nine home runs and 45 RBIs.

In 2013, Olson played with the Beloit Snappers. In 134 games he hit .225/.326/.435 though still hit 23 home runs while driving in 93 RBIs.

Olson played the 2014 season with the Stockton Ports. Throughout the season he was among the home run leaders in Minor League Baseball, as during the season he batted .262/.404/.543 with 37 home runs and 97 RBIs in 138 games, leading all minor leaguers with 500 or more plate appearances with a walk percentage of 18.5%. He played the 2015 season with the Midland RockHounds where he hit .249 with 17 home runs and 75 RBIs in 133 games. Olson played the entire 2016 minor league season with the Nashville Sounds. In 131 games, he batted .235 with 17 home runs and 60 RBIs.

=== Oakland Athletics (2016–2021) ===
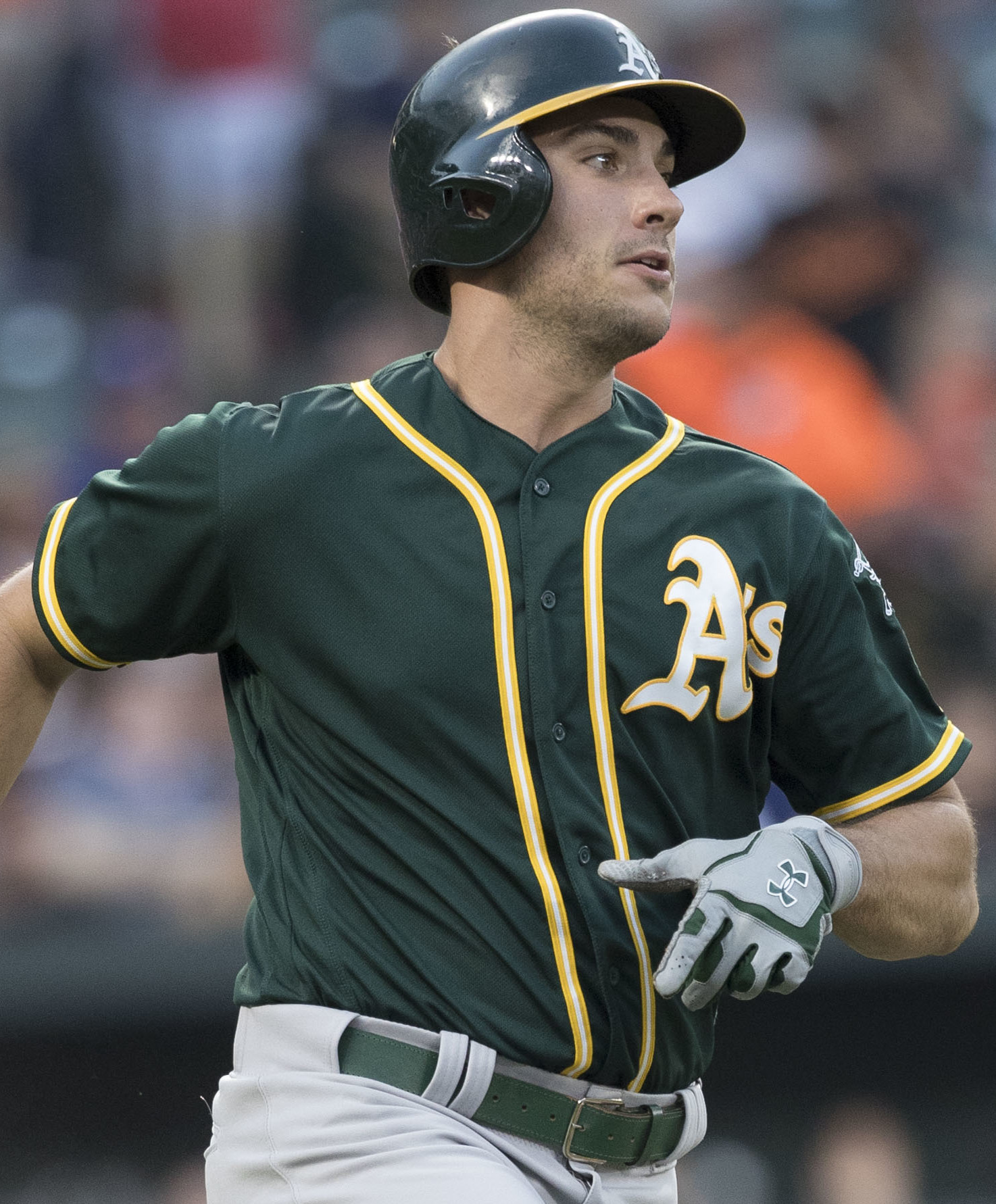
Olson with the Athletics in 2017

The Athletics purchased Olson's contract on September 12, 2016, and he was called up to the major league club. He played in 11 games for Oakland. In 2017, Olson split time between Nashville and Oakland. In 79 games for Nashville, he batted .272 with 23 home runs and 60 RBIs, and in 59 games for Oakland, he hit .259 with 24 home runs and 45 RBIs. With Oakland, he hit 13 in September (a rookie record) and one in five straight games. It was tied for third-most home runs in a player's first 65 career games in MLB history.

Olson spent all of 2018 with Oakland, playing all 162 games. On April 18, Olson hit his first career walk-off, an RBI single to secure a 12–11 comeback win over the Chicago White Sox. His first walk-off home run came in a game against the Houston Astros on August 17. On September 26, he hit his first career grand slam in a 9–3 victory over the Seattle Mariners. Olson finished his 2018 campaign batting .247 with 29 home runs and 84 RBIs. He also won his first Gold Glove Award, leading all AL first basemen with 14 defensive runs saved and an 11.6 ultimate zone rating.

Olson played in both games of the 2019 Opening Series in Tokyo, Japan. During the second game on March 21, he was removed from the game after he felt pain in his right hand. The next day, he underwent successful surgery to remove the hamate bone from the hand, returning to the lineup on May 7. He batted .267/.351/.545 for the 2019 season. On defense, he had a 13 Defensive Runs Saved (DRS) rating, best among first basemen. He received his second consecutive Gold Glove Award for his defensive performance.

On July 24, 2020, Olson hit the first Opening Day walk-off grand slam since 1986. Olson struggled in the 2020 season shortened by the COVID-19 pandemic, batting .195, although he led the Oakland A's in games played (60), home runs (14), and RBIs (42).

In 2021, Olson led the team in games played (156), hits (153), home runs (39), RBIs (111), and walks (88); ranked second for batting average (.271) and on-base percentage (.371); and led the team in slugging percentage (.540). Olson was also selected for the 2021 Major League Baseball All-Star Game to represent the American League and participated in the 2021 Major League Baseball Home Run Derby. Olson was a finalist for the Silver Slugger Award and for the Gold Glove Award.

=== Atlanta Braves (2022–present) ===
On March 14, 2022, the Athletics traded Olson to the Atlanta Braves for Cristian Pache, Shea Langeliers, Joey Estes, and Ryan Cusick. The next day, Olson signed an 8-year contract extension worth $168 million. At the time it was announced, the extension was the largest contract in team history, surpassing an eight-year deal worth $135 million signed by Freddie Freeman in 2014. Its length and total value were exceeded by a contract given to teammate Austin Riley later that season. Olson primarily wore the number 28 jersey with the Oakland Athletics, and used the same number upon signing with the Braves. Olson started wearing number 28 upon his 2017 major league promotion to Oakland because his preferred number (21), which he wore to honor Jeff Francoeur, was then being used by Stephen Vogt. Olson was one of two players in Major League Baseball to appear in all 162 games of the 2022 season, alongside teammate Dansby Swanson, who made 162 starts.

At the midseason of the 2023 season, Olson was again nominated as a reserve infielder for the National League in the 2023 Major League Baseball All-Star Game. In hitting his 40th home run of the 2023 season on August 10, Olson set a franchise record for the quickest 40-homer season. On September 11, he hit his fiftieth home run to become the second-ever member of the 50 home run club from the Braves, following Andruw Jones in 2005. Olson tied, then broke, Jones' franchise record for home runs in a season on September 12 and 16, respectively. On September 28, Olson hit his 54th home run of the season and set the live-ball era franchise single-season record for runs batted in, which had been held by Eddie Mathews. After the 2023 season, Olson was named the winner of the National League Silver Slugger Award for first basemen.

In 2024 he batted .247/.333/.457.

On April 19, 2025, Olson hit his 1,000th career hit against the Minnesota Twins. Olson made the 2025 All-Star Game roster as a reserve. During the penultimate game of the 2025 regular season on September 27, Olson argued a batter interference call and was ejected for the first time in his career. At season's end, Olson won his first Gold Glove Award in the National League, and his third Gold Glove Award overall.

Olson was selected to his fourth All-Star Game in July 2026. At the end of the 2026 season, Olson won his sixth Fielding Bible Award, leading all first baseman, and tied with Yadier Molina and Andrelton Simmons. On November 1, 2026, he was awarded his fourth Golden Glove Award as a first baseman.

== Personal life ==
Olson and his wife Nicole married in November 2021. They reside in Atlanta, Georgia. The couple's eldest son was born in December 2024.

Olson was the Atlanta Braves' 2023 nominee for the Roberto Clemente Award. He is involved with ReClif, a treatment and fitness center for people on the autism spectrum.

== See also ==
- Atlanta Braves award winners and league leaders
- List of Major League Baseball annual putouts leaders
- List of Major League Baseball annual home run leaders
- List of Major League Baseball annual runs batted in leaders
- List of Major League Baseball annual doubles leaders
- List of Major League Baseball career home run leaders
- List of Major League Baseball career games played as a first baseman leaders
- List of Major League Baseball consecutive games played leaders
- Oakland Athletics award winners and league leaders
