= Freddie Freeman =

Canadian-American baseball player (born 1989)

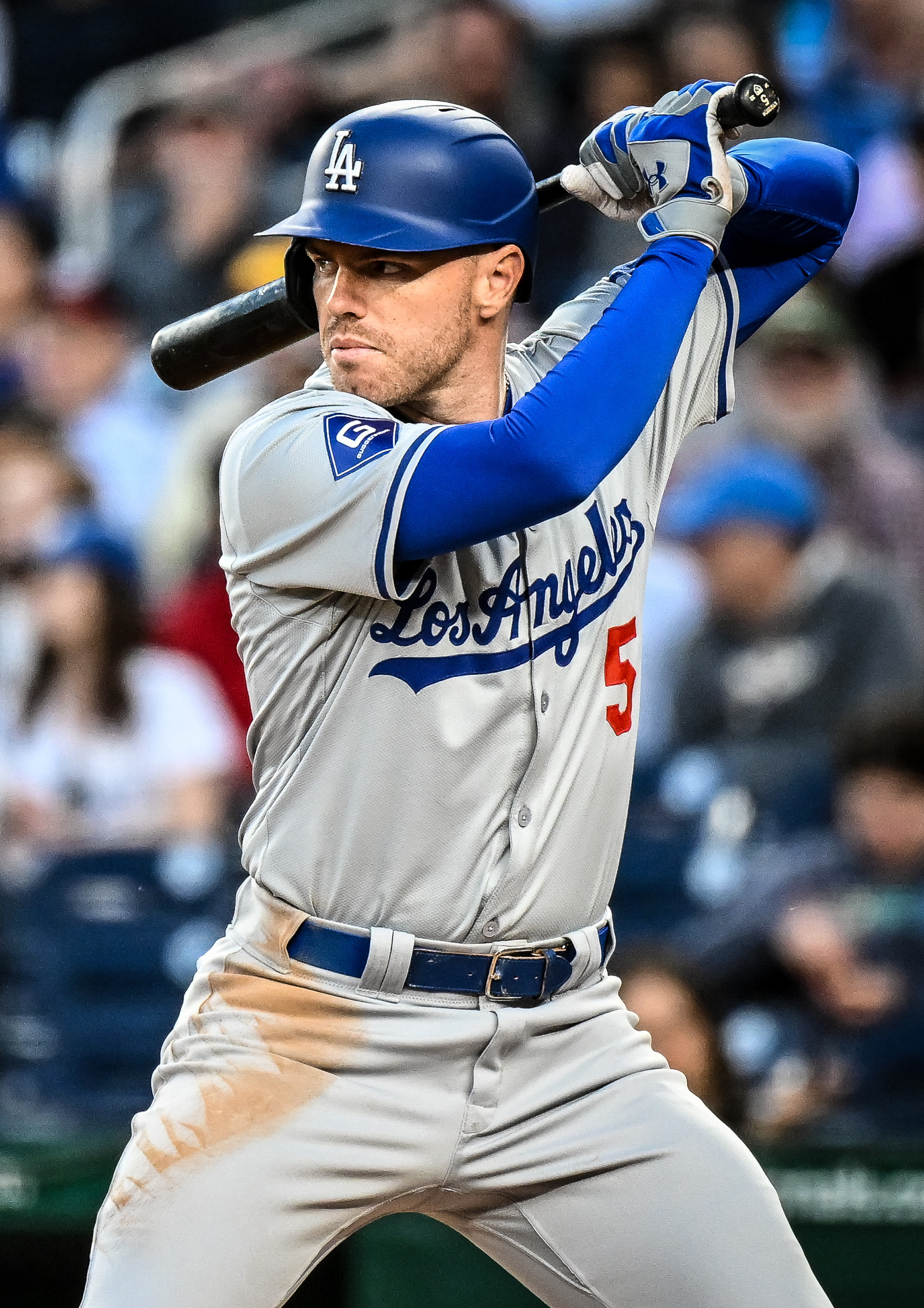
- Freeman with the Los Angeles Dodgers in 2024

Los Angeles Dodgers – No. 5
- First baseman
- Born: September 12, 1989 (age 37); Fountain Valley, California, U.S.
- Bats: Left Throws: Right

MLB debut
- September 1, 2010, for the Atlanta Braves

MLB statistics (through 2026 season)
- Batting average: .299
- Hits: 2,598
- Home runs: 383
- Runs batted in: 1,392
- Stats at Baseball Reference

Teams
- Atlanta Braves (2010–2021); Los Angeles Dodgers (2022–present)

Career highlights and awards
- 10× All-Star (2013, 2014, 2018, 2019, 2021–2026); 3× World Series champion (2021, 2024, 2025); NL MVP (2020); World Series MVP (2024); 2× All-MLB First Team (2020, 2023); Gold Glove Award (2018); 3× Silver Slugger Award (2019–2021); NL Hank Aaron Award (2020)
Medals
Men's baseball
Representing United States
World Youth Baseball Championship
Silver medal – second place	2005 Mazatlán	Team
World Junior Baseball Championship
Silver medal – second place	2006 Sancti Spíritus	Team

Frederick Charles Freeman (born September 12, 1989) is an American and Canadian professional baseball first baseman for the Los Angeles Dodgers of Major League Baseball (MLB). Freeman made his MLB debut with the Atlanta Braves in 2010 and played with them for 12 seasons. After the Braves won the 2021 World Series over the Houston Astros, Freeman entered free agency and signed a six-year, $162 million contract with the Dodgers.

A 10-time MLB All-Star and three-time World Series champion, Freeman won a Gold Glove Award in 2018; the Silver Slugger Award in 2019, 2020, and 2021; and the National League's Most Valuable Player Award in 2020. In 2024, he won World Series MVP after setting a record for consecutive World Series games with a home run, including the first walk-off grand slam in World Series history.

In international competition, Freeman plays on the Canadian national team.

== Early life ==
Frederick Charles Freeman was born on September 12, 1989, in Fountain Valley, California, to Fredrick and Rosemary Freeman. Both of his parents are Canadians from the province of Ontario who moved to California because of Fredrick's work commitments; his father is from Windsor, while his mother was from Peterborough. Rosemary died of melanoma when Freeman was 10; Freeman always wears a long-sleeved shirt during games to honor her memory. Freeman has two older brothers, Andrew and Phillip, and is a sixth generation Salvationist. Because Freeman's parents were both born in Canada, Freeman holds dual Canadian and American citizenship.

Freeman grew up a fan of the Los Angeles Angels. At age six, he practiced with Little League ballplayers from Orange, California, who were older. At age seven, he was placed on a team of nine-year-olds. When Freeman turned nine, he was assigned to play with 12-year-olds. Freeman attended El Modena High School, where he was a third baseman and a pitcher. As a senior in 2007, Freeman hit for a .417 batting average and had a 6–1 win–loss record as a pitcher. The Orange County Register named him its 2007 player of the year. He signed a letter of intent with California State University, Fullerton to play college baseball for the Cal State Fullerton Titans.

== Professional career ==
=== Draft and minor leagues ===
The Atlanta Braves selected Freeman in the second round, with the 78th overall selection, of the 2007 MLB draft. Freeman signed with the team for $409,500, forgoing his college scholarship. He made his professional debut with the Gulf Coast Braves in 2007 and played for the Rome Braves of the Class A South Atlantic League in 2008. He was named the Braves' fifth-best prospect according to Baseball America before the 2009 season.

Freeman started the 2009 season with the Myrtle Beach Pelicans of the Class A-Advanced Carolina League and was promoted to the Mississippi Braves of the Class AA Southern League during the season. Baseball America ranked Freeman the 11th-best prospect overall in their 2009 mid-season top 25. In August 2009, he suffered a wrist injury. After the 2009 season ended, Freeman joined the Peoria Saguaros of the Arizona Fall League. He began the 2010 season with the Gwinnett Braves of the Class AAA International League.

=== Atlanta Braves (2010–2021) ===
==== 2010 ====
Freeman was called up to the Braves on September 1, 2010, as part of the team's September call-ups, and made his MLB debut that same day. On September 5, 2010, he got his first career MLB hit off Florida Marlins pitcher Clay Hensley, and on September 21, 2010, he hit his first MLB home run off Philadelphia Phillies pitcher Roy Halladay. He played 20 games with the Braves and batted .167. Freeman was not a part of the Braves' playoff roster. He returned to the Arizona Fall League, this time to play for the Phoenix Desert Dogs.

==== 2011 ====
Freeman began the 2011 season as the starting first baseman for the Braves. After a slow start, his performance improved and he had been mentioned as a strong candidate for Rookie of the Year. On July 4, 2011, Freeman hit two home runs against the Colorado Rockies, for his first multi-home run game. Freeman was the first Braves rookie to reach 50 RBIs by July 18 since Hank Aaron accomplished this feat in 1954. He was named NL rookie of the month for July; during that month, Freeman led all Major League rookies with 38 hits, a .362 batting average, and a.433 on-base percentage in 27 games. He also led all NL rookies with six homers and 17 runs. His 18 RBIs tied for the most in the NL among rookies.

In August, Freeman and Dan Uggla became the first members of the Braves to have concurrent twenty-game hitting streaks in the modern era. Freeman's streak ended at 20 games on August 7. Freeman finished the 2011 year batting .282 with 32 doubles, 21 home runs, and 76 RBI in 157 games played.

Freeman finished second to teammate Craig Kimbrel in the NL Rookie of the Year balloting. Kimbrel and Freeman were the first teammates to finish first and second since 1989, when the Chicago Cubs' Jerome Walton and Dwight Smith came in first and second. The only other time two Braves finished in the top five, the organization was still located in Milwaukee—Gene Conley was voted third-best rookie of the 1954 season; Hank Aaron came in fourth.

==== 2012 ====
In 2012, Freeman had an NL-leading nine sacrifice flies along with batting .259 with 33 doubles, 23 home runs, and 94 RBI in 147 games played.

==== 2013 ====
In 2013, Freeman was selected as a finalist for the 2013 Major League Baseball All-Star Game Final Vote, where he won with a record-setting total of 19.7 million fan votes, but was unable to play because of a thumb injury suffered three days before the game. Freeman finished the 2013 season with a .319 batting average, along with 23 homers and 109 RBI in 147 games played. He finished fifth on the National League Most Valuable Player award voting.

==== 2014 ====
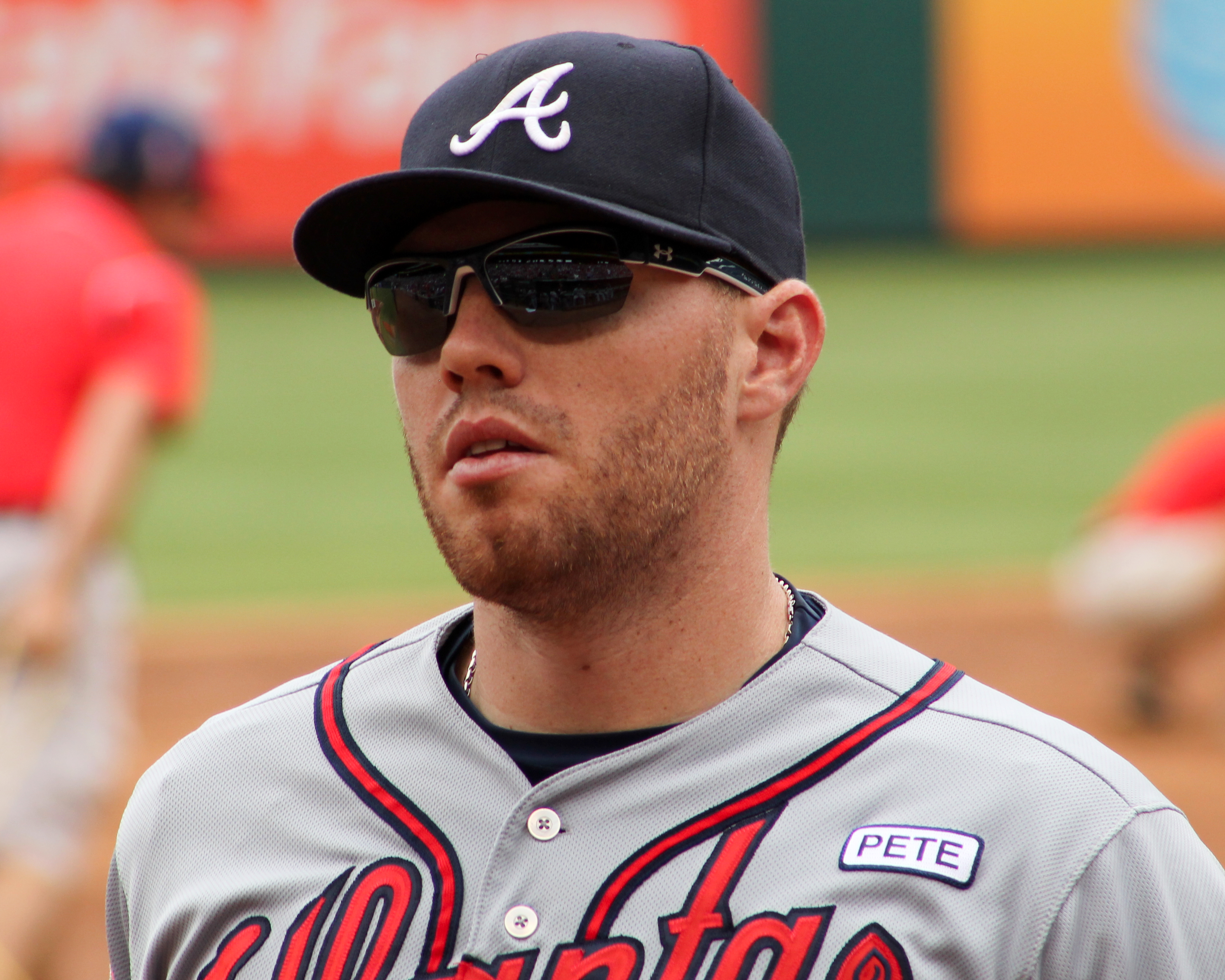
Freeman in 2014

On February 4, 2014, Freeman agreed to an eight-year, $135 million extension. Freeman was named an All-Star for the second time in 2014, and played the last three innings of the game. He led the team in batting average and on-base plus slugging percentage in 2014. Freeman also set a franchise record for innings played. During a game against the Philadelphia Phillies on June 27, 2014, Freeman hit a three-run homer off Kyle Kendrick to left center field caught by broadcaster Tom McCarthy. Freeman finished the 2014 year by appearing in all 162 games batting .288 with 90 walks, 43 doubles, 18 home runs, and 78 RBI.

==== 2015 ====
On June 17, 2015, Freeman was listed as day-to-day with an injury to his right wrist originally sustained during a June 13 game against the New York Mets. He missed the June 18 game against the Boston Red Sox, ending a streak of 234 consecutive games played, which led the majors at the time. Freeman was officially placed on the 15-day disabled list on June 23, and received a platelet-rich plasma injection soon afterward. He was eligible for activation on July 3, but did not return to action until July 28, three days after he was removed from the disabled list. For the season, Freeman hit for a .276 batting average with 18 home runs and 66 RBIs in 118 games, his fewest played since 2011.

==== 2016 ====
General manager John Coppolella became responsible for the team's transactions in the 2014–15 off-season, and played a large role in the Braves' rebuild, trading away many players. However, during the 2015–16 off-season, Coppolella repeatedly stated he would not trade Freeman. At the beginning of the 2016 season, Freeman was expected to lead the team on the field, despite the wrist injury the previous year adversely affecting his off-season preparations. Freeman had a difficult start to the season but began hitting well in June. On June 15, Freeman hit his first career cycle in a 9–8 victory against the Cincinnati Reds. He was named National League Player of the Week soon after that performance. Freeman recorded his first 30-home run season in 2016, reaching that mark on September 13, shortly after claiming his second Player of the Week award of the season. That same day he also drove in the 500th run of his career. On September 29, Freeman's 30-game hitting streak, which had begun on August 24, was halted with an 0–4 night against the Philadelphia Phillies. It had been a part of a larger 46-game run of getting on base, which also ended. During the penultimate week of the regular season, Freeman again was recognized as Player of the Week, and named National League Player of the Month for September at the end of the year. Overall in 2016, Freeman played 158 games with a .302 batting average, 43 doubles, 34 home runs, and 91 RBI. For the season, he led all major league hitters in line drive percentage (29.1%). He finished sixth on the National League Most Valuable Player award voting.

==== 2017 ====
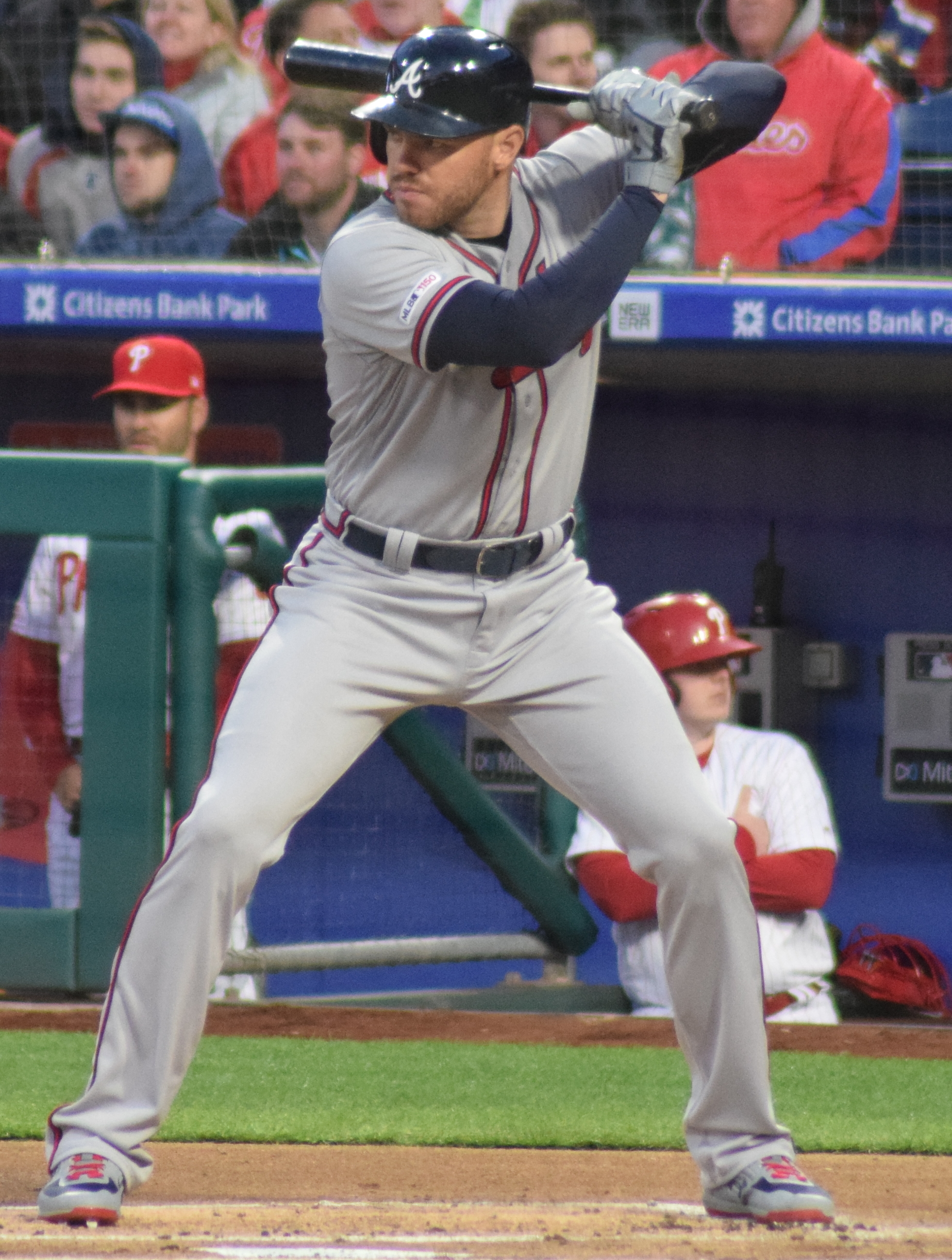
Freeman in 2019

Freeman was the starting first baseman on Opening Day against the New York Mets, going 3–4, including a triple. In the first game at SunTrust Park, Freeman doubled in a couple of runs. He continued to tear up Padres pitching, hitting three homers in the series. On April 19 against the Washington Nationals, he set a franchise record for most consecutive plate appearances to get on base with a solo homer.

On May 17, Freeman was hit by a pitch from Aaron Loup of Toronto, resulting in him leaving the game. An MRI and CT scan later revealed a non-displaced wrist fracture in his left hand, ruling him out for up to 10 weeks. At the time, Freeman was an early candidate for the MVP award, leading the league in home runs with 14, and ranking second in both on-base and slugging percentage.

While rehabilitating his hand injury, Freeman stated in June 2017 that he offered to play third base upon his return, because his replacement at first base, Matt Adams, was hitting well. On July 1, Freeman appeared with the Triple-A Gwinnett Braves on a rehab assignment in which he played third base. Three days later, he returned to Atlanta, and started at third base against the Houston Astros. Freeman recorded his 1,000th career hit in a game against the Washington Nationals on July 6. Braves manager Brian Snitker stated in August that Freeman would no longer play third base regularly, as injuries to other players necessitated late-season promotions and allowed Freeman to return to first base.

Freeman finished the season batting .307 with 28 home runs and 71 RBIs despite only playing in 117 games, his lowest total since 2010. He led the Braves in home runs, batting average, and was second in RBIs.

==== 2018 ====
Freeman underwent LASIK surgery in October 2017, to correct vision problems that had manifested since 2012. He was selected to his third All-Star game as the National League's starting first baseman. He also accepted an invitation to participate in the 2018 Home Run Derby.

Freeman finished the regular season as the National League leader in base hits with 191. Only Whit Merrifield had more in Major League Baseball. He also finished as the Braves' team leader in batting average (.309), on-base percentage (.388), slugging percentage (.505), doubles (44), walks (76), and RBIs (98). For the season, he led all major league hitters in line drive percentage (32.3%).

Freeman, along with Anthony Rizzo of the Chicago Cubs, won the 2018 Gold Glove for first base in the National League. Freeman's teammates Ender Inciarte and Nick Markakis won the same award for center field and right field, respectively, marking the first time that three Atlanta Braves had won the honor in the same season. Additionally, Freeman received the 2018 Wilson Defensive Player of the Year Award and finished fourth in the National League Most Valuable Player award voting.

==== 2019 ====
At midseason, Freeman was selected as the National League starter at first base in the 2019 Major League Baseball All-Star Game. The appearance was his second consecutive start in the game and his fourth All-Star Game selection overall.

In 2019 Freeman batted .295/.389/.549 with 38 home runs and 121 RBIs and led all NL hitters in line drive percentage (27.5%). Freeman and teammates Ronald Acuña Jr. and Ozzie Albies won the 2019 National League Silver Slugger Awards for first base, the outfield, and second base, respectively and Freeman also won the Wilson Defensive Player of the Year Award for the second consecutive season.

On October 18, it was revealed he had undergone right elbow surgery to remove a bone spur. Freeman admitted the spur had bothered him in recent years. It was first discovered on September 13.

==== 2020: NL MVP ====
Freeman tested positive for COVID-19 in July 2020, before the season began. He was one of the few symptomatic MLB patients, experiencing a loss of smell and a high fever. He recovered in time to participate in some training camp activities, held before the shortened season's Opening Day. Freeman hit his first career grand slam on September 4, in the second game of a doubleheader against the Washington Nationals off pitcher Tanner Rainey. Two days later, he hit another grand slam, against Nationals pitcher Kyle Finnegan. On September 9, he reached 1,500 career hits with a home run. During that same game against the Miami Marlins, he set a career-high by driving in six runs.

Freeman finished the shortened 60-game regular season hitting .341 with 13 home runs and 53 RBIs. He led the major leagues with 23 doubles and 51 runs scored. Freeman's offensive performance won him a second Silver Slugger Award. He was named the NL MVP, becoming the first Braves player to win the award since Chipper Jones in 1999. Freeman was also voted the Baseball Digest MLB Player of the Year, Baseball America Player of the Year, MLBPA Player's Choice Player of the Year, and MLBPA Player's Choice NL Outstanding Player. Additionally, he was awarded the 2020 NL Hank Aaron Award, becoming the second player in franchise history to win the award, following Andruw Jones in 2005.

==== 2021: First World Series championship ====
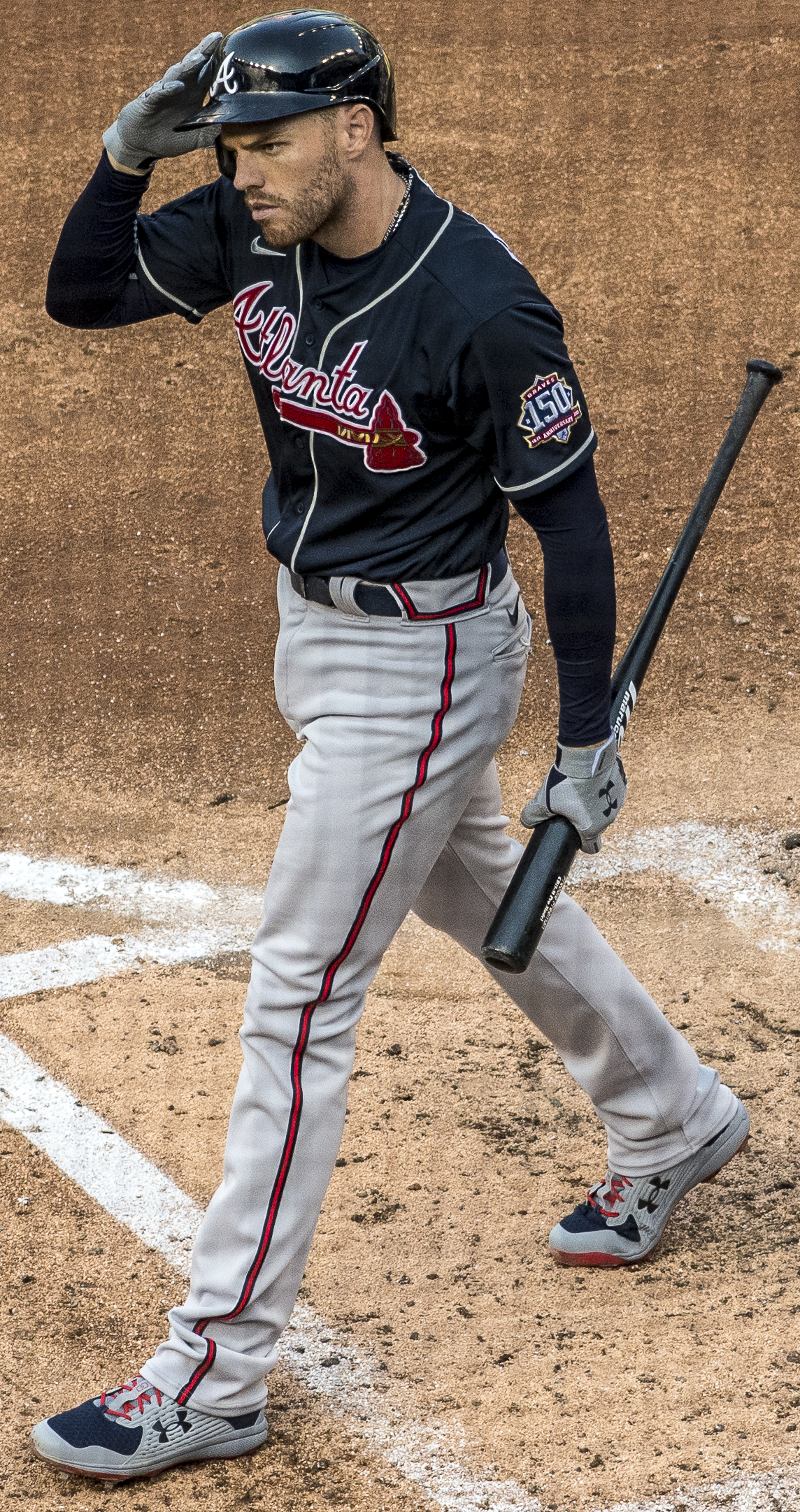
Freeman after an at bat during his final season with the Braves in 2021

Freeman was named the National League's starting first baseman for the 2021 All-Star Game. On August 18, he hit for the cycle against the Marlins. This was the fourth time an Atlanta Braves player had done it, the second time for Freeman, and only the ninth time in Braves' history. His second career cycle improved his batting average to .301. Freeman finished the season with a .300 batting average, a .896 OPS, and 31 home runs. The 2021 Braves became the second team in MLB history for which each starting infielder hit at least 25 home runs. On October 12, Freeman hit what would turn out to be the game-winning solo home run in the bottom of the eighth inning in a tied National League Division Series game four against the Milwaukee Brewers. This home run in a knotted 4–4 ballgame allowed the Braves to advance to the National League Championship Series for the second consecutive year.

The Braves faced the Houston Astros in the World Series. In Game 5, Freeman hit a 460-foot home run. The Braves defeated the Astros in six games, with Freeman recording the final putout of the Series. Freeman received his third consecutive Silver Slugger Award and his first Babe Ruth Award. He joined Hank Aaron, Chipper Jones, and Johnny Evers as the only Braves to win a World Series and an MVP award.

The last year of Freeman's contract with the Braves was 2021, and he was widely expected to remain with the Braves. Freeman stated a desire to remain with the Braves for his whole career. Freeman and the Braves had exchanged offers for a new contract during the 2021 season, including a five-year, $125 million offer the Braves made before the trade deadline. Freeman declined the Braves' qualifying offer following the season and became a free agent for the first time in his career. During the offseason, the Braves reportedly increased their offer to five years and $140 million, but Freeman and his agent insisted on a sixth year. Freeman's agent gave the Braves an ultimatum, offering them two proposals and giving them one hour to accept one of them. The Braves declined both and pulled their offer off the table. The following day, the Braves acquired first baseman Matt Olson from the Oakland Athletics and signed Olson to an eight-year extension, effectively closing the door on Freeman's tenure as a Brave.

=== Los Angeles Dodgers (2022–present) ===
Other teams pursued Freeman during the offseason, including the Los Angeles Dodgers, and, with no future in Atlanta, Freeman opted to return home to Southern California. On March 18, 2022, he signed a six-year, $162 million contract with the Dodgers.

==== 2022 ====
Freeman made his Dodgers debut on April 8, 2022, batting second in the lineup and going 1–3 with a walk against the Colorado Rockies. On April 18, before a game between the Dodgers and the Atlanta Braves at Dodger Stadium, Freeman was presented his 2021 Silver Slugger Award, with Braves manager Brian Snitker and hitting coach Kevin Seitzer attending the ceremony. In the game that followed, Freeman hit his first home run as a Dodger in what was also his first career at bat against his former team. Freeman was presented his World Series ring before the Dodgers played the Braves at Truist Park on June 24. Several days later, Doug Gottlieb falsely reported that Freeman had fired his agent and management team.

Freeman was named an All-Star on July 17, replacing Starling Marte on the National League roster. In 159 games in 2022, Freeman led MLB with 199 hits and 47 doubles as well as leading the majors in line drive percentage (27.5%). His batting average was second in the National League at .325 and he had 21 home runs and 100 RBI.

==== 2023 ====
On May 18, 2023, Freeman hit his 300th career home run, a grand slam off of Génesis Cabrera of the St. Louis Cardinals. About a month later, Freeman earned his 2,000th career hit, becoming the 295th MLB player to do so. At midseason, Freeman was named starting first baseman for the National League in the All-Star Game, his third consecutive selection. On September 8, Freeman hit his 53rd double of the season breaking the Dodgers franchise record held by Johnny Frederick with the 1929 Brooklyn Robins. On September 22 against the San Francisco Giants, he picked up his 200th hit of the season, the first Dodger to do so since Adrián Beltré in 2004. He became the only first baseman in history to have 20 home runs, 20 steals, and 200 hits in the same season. In 161 games, Freeman finished with a .331 batting average, 211 hits, 29 home runs, 102 RBI, 102 runs scored, and an MLB-leading 59 doubles. Defensively, he committed only one error in 1,260 total chances in 1,378 1/3 innings played for a league-leading .999 fielding percentage at his position.

==== 2024: Second championship and World Series MVP ====
On May 20, 2024, during a game against the Arizona Diamondbacks, Freeman hit his sixth career grand slam against pitcher Slade Cecconi. Freeman hit another grand slam on July 19 against Boston Red Sox pitcher Brennan Bernardino. He played in his fourth consecutive All-Star Game. However, his three-year-old son came down with a viral infection during the event and was later paralyzed, hospitalized, and put on a ventilator. Freeman missed 8 games to care for his son. He played in 147 games, with 22 home runs, 89 RBI, and a .282 batting average, his lowest since the 2015 season.

Freeman suffered a serious ankle sprain in the Dodgers home finale on September 26 which hampered him in the NLDS. He still managed to play in four of the five games, batting .286 (four hits in 14 at bats). The injury continued to bother him in the NLCS, as he had just three hits in four games (.167 average) and was not in the lineup for the clinching Game 6.

In Game 1 of the World Series, while still feeling the effects of the ankle injury, Freeman hit a walk-off grand slam—the first in a World Series game—off Nestor Cortés of the New York Yankees. He then hit homers in Games 2, 3, and 4 of the Series, becoming the first player to homer in the first four games of a World Series. He also extended his streak of World Series games with a home run to six, a record, while hitting .300 with six runs scored and a triple in the series. His 12 RBI in the series set a franchise record and tied the World Series record set in 1960 by Bobby Richardson. The Dodgers won the Series in five games, and Freeman received the World Series Most Valuable Player Award.

Freeman underwent surgery on his injured ankle after the season.

==== 2025: Third World Series championship ====
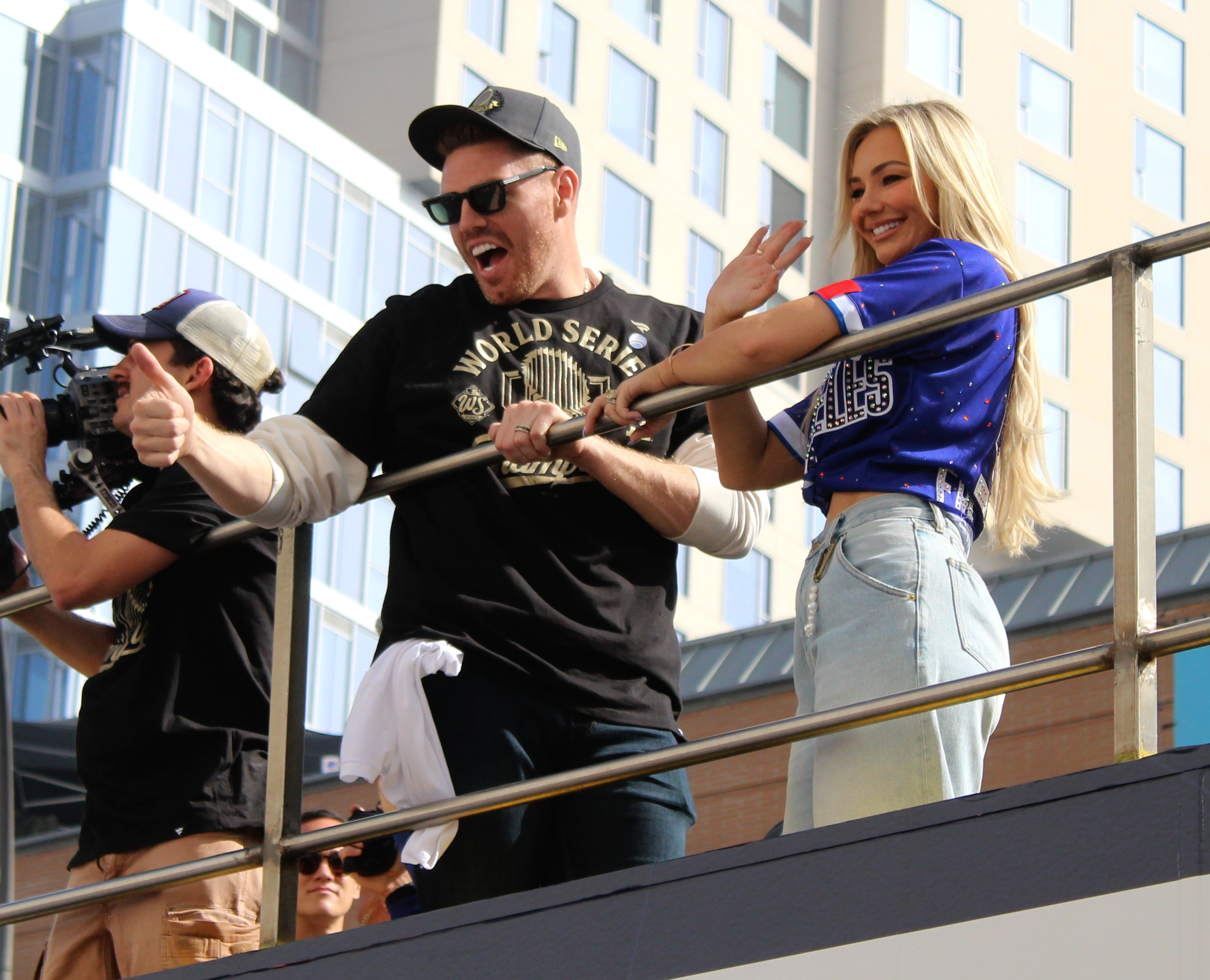
Freddie Freeman and his wife Chelsea at the Los Angeles Dodgers parade, 2025

Freeman was initially in the lineup for the Tokyo Series to start the 2025 season but was scratched from Game 1 due to left rib discomfort. He hit his 350th career home run off pitcher Sandy Alcántara on May 5. On May 12, Freeman was named the NL Player of the Week for May 5–May 11 after going 12-for-24 with three home runs, 12 RBI, and seven extra base hits. Fans selected him to start the All-Star Game, his fifth start. On June 28, Freeman recorded his 4,000th career total base on a home run against the Kansas City Royals in the seventh inning. He became the 91st player in Major League history to achieve this feat. He finished the season with a slash line of .295/.367/.502 with 24 home runs and 90 RBI in 147 games.

In the postseason, Freeman had two hits, including a double, in 10 at bats in the Wild Card Series, three hits in 15 at bats in the NLDS, and four hits (including a home run and two doubles) in 16 at bats in the 2025 NLCS. In Game 3 of the World Series, Freeman hit a walk-off home run off Brendon Little of the Toronto Blue Jays in the 18th inning, becoming the first player to hit a walk-off home run multiple times in the World Series. Overall, in the seven game series, he had six hits in 29 at bats (.207 average) as the Dodgers defeated the Blue Jays to repeat as champions and give Freeman his third-career World Series championship.

==== 2026 ====
In the 2026 season, Freeman played in 153 games, batting .288 with 16 home runs and 70 RBI. The power numbers were the lowest of his career as he battled knee pain through the last few months of the season.

== International career ==
As a high schooler, Freeman played with the United States national under-15 team at the 2005 U15 Baseball World Cup in Mexico, where they earned the silver medal.

Freeman, who holds Canadian citizenship through his parents, changed his representation to Canada for the 2017 World Baseball Classic (WBC), something he had always wanted to do. In the tournament, Freeman hit .182/.182/.182 with two hits and three strikeouts. In the 2023 WBC, Freeman again played for Canada. He slashed .200/.273/.200 in 10 at bats, with two hits and one walk. Canada finished third in Pool C, behind the U.S. and Mexico, eliminated from the tournament but qualifying for the next WBC. Freeman withdrew from the 2026 WBC citing personal reasons.

== Player profile ==
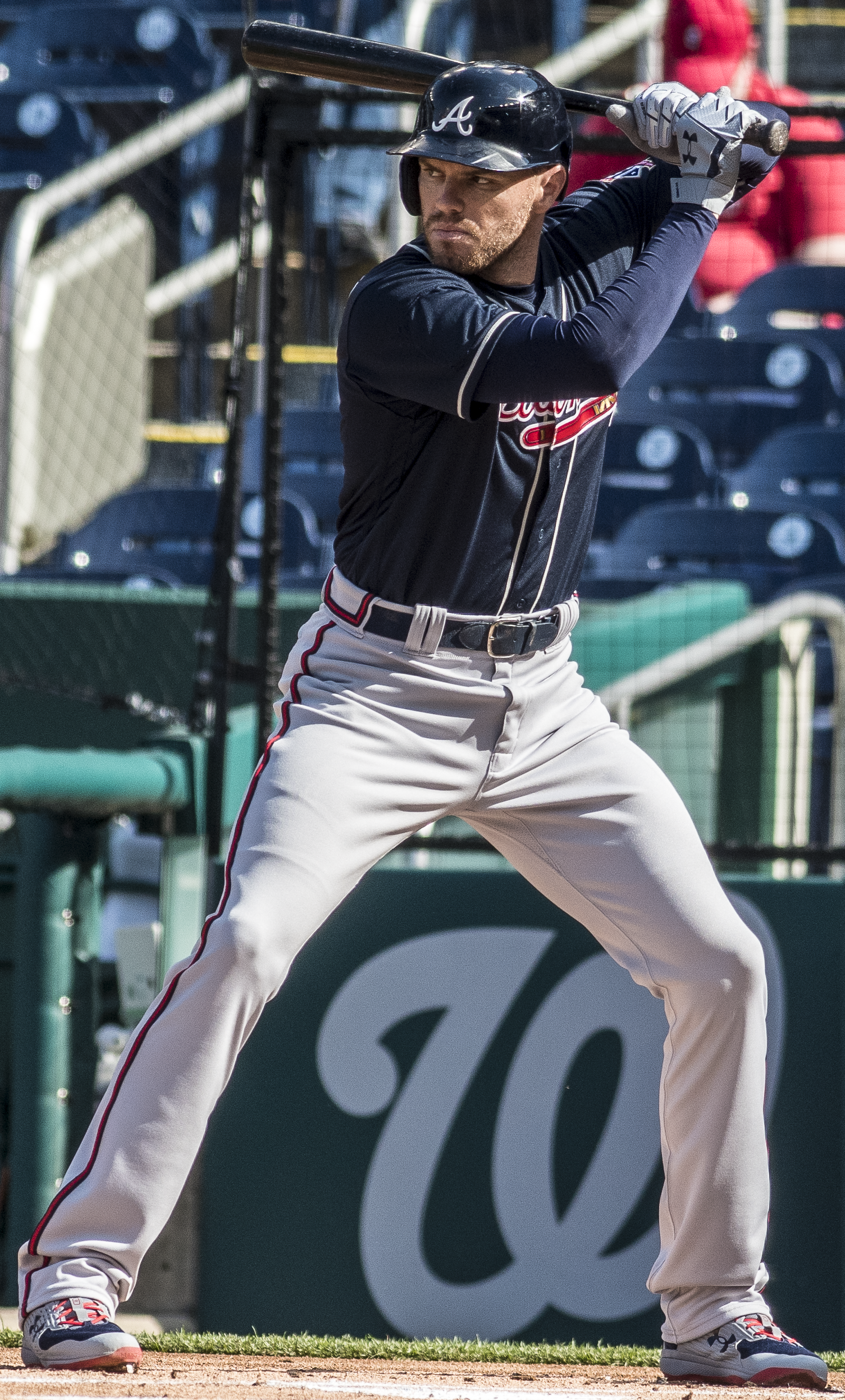
Freeman's batting stance in 2021.

Freeman's powerful swing, in which he moves his shoulders slightly before lowering his hands, has been described as "unorthodox" and compared to a tennis forehand. His hand-eye coordination and ability to adjust to pitchers from one plate appearance to the next have also drawn praise.

He formerly wore contact lenses while playing, and occasionally even wore glasses, a rarity for position players in MLB, until finally having his vision repaired with Lasik surgery.

Freeman is viewed positively by fans and competitors who have described him as kind, humble, and a good leader. He is noted for his propensity to strike up conversations with opposing baserunners. Braves manager Brian Snitker described Freeman as "my rock" and "everything that the Braves stand for." Dodgers manager Dave Roberts described him as "the modern-day Tony Gwynn."

== Personal life ==
Freeman married Chelsea Goff in 2014. She appeared in season 8, episode 15 of Say Yes to the Dress: Atlanta. The couple has three sons and one daughter. Freeman's youngest son, Maximus, was diagnosed with Guillain–Barré syndrome in 2024. While he played for the Braves, Freeman and his family lived in Atlanta during baseball season and in California during the off-season. Shortly after signing with the Dodgers, he commuted to Dodger Stadium from Corona del Mar and planned to maintain his Atlanta residence. Later, he began renting a home in Studio City.

During a 2014 winter storm, Freeman was stuck in a traffic jam that was not moving. Freeman stayed stuck for hours until former teammate Chipper Jones arrived on his ATV and rescued Freeman. In January 2016, the Atlanta Braves announced a "Chipper Rescues Freddie" bobblehead night for the following season. This was used as a promotional night for the franchise.

Freeman's cousin Carson Branstine is a professional tennis player.

== See also ==
- Atlanta Braves award winners and league leaders
- Los Angeles Dodgers award winners and league leaders • Team records
- List of Major League Baseball annual doubles leaders
- List of Major League Baseball annual putouts leaders
- List of Major League Baseball annual runs scored leaders
- List of Major League Baseball career assists as a first baseman leaders
- List of Major League Baseball career at bat leaders
- List of Major League Baseball career hits leaders
- List of Major League Baseball career doubles leaders
- List of Major League Baseball career extra base hits leaders
- List of Major League Baseball career home run leaders
- List of Major League Baseball career hit by pitch leaders
- List of Major League Baseball career intentional bases on balls leaders
- List of Major League Baseball career games played as a first baseman leaders
- List of Major League Baseball career OPS leaders
- List of Major League Baseball career plate appearance leaders
- List of Major League Baseball career runs batted in leaders
- List of Major League Baseball career runs scored leaders
- List of Major League Baseball career slugging percentage leaders
- List of Major League Baseball career strikeouts by batters leaders
- List of Major League Baseball career times on base leaders
- List of Major League Baseball career total bases leaders
- List of Major League Baseball career WAR leaders
- List of Major League Baseball doubles records
- List of Major League Baseball players to hit for the cycle

Achievements
Preceded by Matt Kemp; Jake Cronenworth	Hitting for the cycle June 15, 2016; August 18, 2021	Succeeded by Rajai Davis; Eddie Rosario
Preceded by Kris Bryant; Fernando Tatís Jr. Ronald Acuña Jr.	National League Player of the Month; September 2016; September 2020; May 2023	Succeeded by Ryan Zimmerman; Ronald Acuña Jr. Ronald Acuña Jr.
