= 2021 Atlanta Braves season =

Major League Baseball season

2021 Atlanta Braves
- World Series champions National League champions National League East champions
- League: National League
- Division: East
- Ballpark: Truist Park
- City: Atlanta
- Record: 88–73 (.547) (Note: Atlanta only played 161 games because the scheduled game against the Colorado Rockies on September 16 was cancelled due to weather, and no make-up game took place since the result would have had very little effect on the standings.)
- Divisional place: 1st
- Owners: Liberty Media/John Malone
- General manager: Alex Anthopoulos
- Manager: Brian Snitker
- Television: Bally Sports Southeast; Bally Sports South (Chip Caray, Jeff Francoeur, Paul Byrd, Tom Glavine, Dale Murphy, Joe Simpson, Kelly Crull)
- Radio: 680 The Fan; Rock 100.5; Atlanta Braves Radio Network (Ben Ingram, Jim Powell, Joe Simpson); 1600 La Mejor (Daniel Cantú, Emanuel Zamarrón)

The 2021 Atlanta Braves season was the 151st season of the Atlanta Braves franchise, the 56th season in Atlanta, and the Braves' 5th season at Truist Park. The Braves were managed by Brian Snitker, in his 6th season as the team's manager. The Braves clinched their fourth consecutive National League East title. They defeated the Milwaukee Brewers in the NLDS and faced the Los Angeles Dodgers in the NLCS for the second straight year. They defeated the Dodgers in six games to reach the World Series for the first time since 1999. They would go on to defeat the Houston Astros in six games, winning their first World Series since 1995, their second since moving to Atlanta, and their fourth in franchise history. Jorge Soler won the Most Valuable Player award in the World Series.

== Offseason ==
=== November ===
- On November 11, 2020, the Braves re-signed right-handed relief pitcher Josh Tomlin to a one-year, $1 million contract that includes a $1.25 million club option for 2022.
- On November 16, 2020, the Braves signed left-handed starting pitcher Drew Smyly to a one-year, $11 million contract.
- On November 24, 2020, the Braves signed right-handed starting pitcher Charlie Morton to a one-year, $15 million contract.

=== February ===
- On February 5, 2021, the Braves re-signed outfielder Marcell Ozuna to a four-year, $64 million contract. The contract includes a club option for a fifth year, worth $16 million, with a $1 million buyout.

== Regular season ==
The 2021 season wasn't a smooth sailing road for the Atlanta Braves. The Braves started off 0-4 and ended April with a 12–14 record. At the All-Star Break they were 44–45. After the All-Star Break in August they started ramping it up and went 18–8. On August 8, they climbed over .500 for the first time, at 57–56, and on Aug 15. they took over first place in the NL East, ending up winning the NL East with a 88–73 record.

The team's turnaround began after July 10 when Ronald Acuña Jr. suffered a season ending injury and the trade deadline approached. After the Braves' star outfielder got injured, GM Alex Anthopoulos remade his outfield by bringing in veterans Adam Duvall, Joc Pederson, Eddie Rosario, and Jorge Soler. They made a huge impact on the team with Duvall finishing the season with a National League-leading 113 RBIs (45 with the Braves); Pederson hit a game-winning home run in the NLDS against the Brewers; Rosario was the NLCS MVP; Soler was the World Series MVP.

=== National League East ===
NL East
Team	W	L	Pct.	GB	Home	Road
Atlanta Braves	88	73	.547	—	42‍–‍38	46‍–‍35
Philadelphia Phillies	82	80	.506	6½	47‍–‍34	35‍–‍46
New York Mets	77	85	.475	11½	47‍–‍34	30‍–‍51
Miami Marlins	67	95	.414	21½	42‍–‍39	25‍–‍56
Washington Nationals	65	97	.401	23½	35‍–‍46	30‍–‍51

=== National League division leaders ===
Division leaders
Team	W	L	Pct.
San Francisco Giants	107	55	.660
Milwaukee Brewers	95	67	.586
Atlanta Braves	88	73	.547

Wild Card teams (Top 2 teams qualify for postseason)
Team	W	L	Pct.	GB
Los Angeles Dodgers	106	56	.654	+16
St. Louis Cardinals	90	72	.556	—
Cincinnati Reds	83	79	.512	7
Philadelphia Phillies	82	80	.506	8
San Diego Padres	79	83	.488	11
New York Mets	77	85	.475	13
Colorado Rockies	74	87	.460	15½
Chicago Cubs	71	91	.438	19
Miami Marlins	67	95	.414	23
Washington Nationals	65	97	.401	25
Pittsburgh Pirates	61	101	.377	29
Arizona Diamondbacks	52	110	.321	38

=== Record vs. opponents ===
2021 National League record Source: MLB Standings Grid – 2021
Team	AZ	ATL	CHC	CIN	COL	LAD	MIA	MIL	NYM	PHI	PIT	SD	SF	STL	WSH	AL
Arizona	—	3–4	2–4	5–1	9–10	3–16	2–5	1–6	1–5	4–3	4–2	8–11	2–17	1–6	3–4	4–16
Atlanta	4–3	—	5–2	4–3	2–4	2–4	11–8	3–3	10–9	10–9	4–3	4–2	3–3	6–1	14–5	6–14
Chicago	4–2	2–5	—	8–11	3–3	4–3	1–5	4–15	4–3	2–5	14–5	5–1	1–6	9–10	4–3	6–14
Cincinnati	1–5	3–4	11–8	—	5–2	3–3	5–2	9–10	3–3	4–2	13–6	1–6	1–6	10–9	5–2	9–11
Colorado	10–9	4–2	3–3	2–5	—	6–13	4–2	2–5	2–5	5–2	4–2	11–8	4–15	3–4	4–2	10–10
Los Angeles	16–3	4–2	3–4	3–3	13–6	—	3–4	4–3	6–1	4–2	6–0	12–7	9–10	4–3	7–0	12–8
Miami	5–2	8–11	5–1	2–5	2–4	4–3	—	3–3	9–10	10–9	2–5	3–4	3–4	0–6	8–11	3–17
Milwaukee	6–1	3–3	15–4	10–9	5–2	3–4	3–3	—	4–2	2–5	14–5	5–2	4–3	8–11	5–1	8–12
New York	5–1	9–10	3–4	3–3	5–2	1–6	10–9	2–4	—	9–10	3–4	4–3	1–5	2–5	11–8	9–11
Philadelphia	3–4	9–10	5–2	2–4	2–5	2–4	9–10	5–2	10–9	—	4–3	4–2	2–4	4–3	13–6	8–12
Pittsburgh	2–4	3–4	5–14	6–13	2–4	0–6	5–2	5–14	4–3	3–4	—	3–4	4–3	7–12	2–4	10–10
San Diego	11–8	2–4	1–5	6–1	8–11	7–12	4–3	2–5	3–4	2–4	4–3	—	8–11	3–3	4–3	14–6
San Francisco	17–2	3–3	6–1	6–1	15–4	10–9	4–3	3–4	5–1	4–2	3–4	11–8	—	2–4	5–2	13–7
St. Louis	6–1	1–6	10–9	9–10	4–3	3–4	6–0	11–8	5–2	3–4	12–7	3–3	4–2	—	2–4	11–9
Washington	4–3	5–14	3–4	2–5	2–4	0–7	11–8	1–5	8–11	6–13	4–2	3–4	2–5	4–2	—	10–10

=== Game log ===
2021 Game Log: 88–73 (Home: 42–38; Away: 46–35)
April: 12–14 (Home: 7–7; Away: 5–7)

#	Date	Opponent	Score	Win	Loss	Save	Attendance	Record	Box/Streak
1	April 1	@ Phillies	2–3 (10)	Brogdon (1–0)	**Jones** (0–1)	—	8,529	0–1	L1
2	April 3	@ Phillies	0–4	Wheeler (1–0)	**Morton** (0–1)	—	8,582	0–2	L2
3	April 4	@ Phillies	1–2	Alvarado (1–0)	**Martin** (0–1)	Neris (1)	10,773	0–3	L3
–	April 5	@ Nationals	Postponed (COVID-19, Makeup April 7)						
4	April 6	@ Nationals	5–6	Hudson (1–0)	**Smith** (0–1)	—	4,801	0–4	L4
5	April 7 (1)	@ Nationals	7–6 (7)	**Tomlin** (1–0)	Fedde (0–1)	**Smith** (1)	N/A	1–4	W1
6	April 7 (2)	@ Nationals	2–0 (7)	**Jackson** (1–0)	Rainey (0–1)	**Newcomb** (1)	4,927	2–4	W2
7	April 9	Phillies	8–1	**Morton** (1–1)	Wheeler (1–1)	—	14,342	3–4	W3
8	April 10	Phillies	5–4	**Newcomb** (1–0)	Bradley (0–1)	**Smith** (2)	14,394	4–4	W4
9	April 11	Phillies	6–7	Alvarado (2–0)	**Smith** (0–2)	Neris (2)	14,221	4–5	L1
10	April 12	Marlins	3–5 (10)	García (1–1)	**Webb** (0–1)	—	11,830	4–6	L2
11	April 13	Marlins	8–14	Curtiss (1–0)	**Fried** (0–1)	—	12,036	4–7	L3
12	April 14	Marlins	5–6 (10)	Curtiss (2–0)	**Matzek** (0–1)	García (2)	12,480	4–8	L4
13	April 15	Marlins	7–6	**Minter** (1–0)	Floro (0–1)	—	11,739	5–8	W1
14	April 16	@ Cubs	5–2	**Tomlin** (2–0)	Davies (1–2)	**Smith** (3)	10,343	6–8	W2
15	April 17	@ Cubs	4–13	Williams (2–1)	**Ynoa** (0–1)	—	10,343	6–9	L1
16	April 18	@ Cubs	13–4	**Wilson** (1–0)	Hendricks (0–2)	—	10,343	7–9	W1
17	April 20	@ Yankees	1–3	Loáisiga (2–0)	**Matzek** (0–2)	Chapman (2)	10,017	7–10	L1
18	April 21	@ Yankees	4–1	**Anderson** (1–0)	Kluber (0–2)	—	9,634	8–10	W1
19	April 23	Diamondbacks	5–4	**Ynoa** (1–1)	Weaver (1–2)	**Smith** (4)	19,258	9–10	W2
—	April 24	Diamondbacks	(Rain, makeup date: April 25)						
20	April 25 (1)	Diamondbacks	0–5 (7)	Gallen (1–0)	**Wilson** (1–1)	—	N/A	9–11	L1
21	April 25 (2)	Diamondbacks	0–7 (7)	Bumgarner (2–2)	**Smyly** (0–1)	—	20,693	9–12	L2
22	April 26	Cubs	8–7	**Morton** (2–1)	Workman (0–2)	**Smith** (5)	17,956	10–12	W1
23	April 27	Cubs	5–0	**Anderson** (2–0)	Williams (2–2)	—	17,603	11–12	W2
24	April 28	Cubs	10–0	**Ynoa** (2–1)	Hendricks (1–3)	—	18,709	12–12	W3
25	April 29	Cubs	3–9	Alzolay (1–2)	**Wilson** (1–2)	—	19,661	12–13	L1
26	April 30	@ Blue Jays	5–13	Ray (1–1)	**Smyly** (0–2)	—	1,629	12–14	L2

May: 13–12 (Home: 7–7; Away: 6–5)

#	Date	Opponent	Score	Win	Loss	Save	Attendance	Record	Box/Streak
27	May 1	@ Blue Jays	5–6 (10)	Romano (2–1)	**Jones** (0–2)	—	1,634	12–15	L3
28	May 2	@ Blue Jays	2–7	Borucki (3–1)	**Anderson** (2–1)	Dolis (3)	1,554	12–16	L4
29	May 4	@ Nationals	6–1	**Ynoa** (3–1)	Ross (2–2)	—	8,156	13–16	W1
30	May 5	@ Nationals	5–3	**Fried** (1–1)	Fedde (2–3)	**Smith** (6)	8,400	14–16	W2
31	May 6	@ Nationals	3–2	**Smyly** (1–2)	Lester (0–1)	**Smith** (7)	8,561	15–16	W3
32	May 7	Phillies	2–12	Eflin (2–1)	**Morton** (2–2)	—	38,952	15–17	L1
33	May 8	Phillies	8–7 (12)	**Webb** (1–1)	De Los Santos (0–1)	—	39,852	16–17	W1
34	May 9	Phillies	6–1	**Ynoa** (4–1)	Nola (3–2)	—	28,829	17–17	W2
35	May 11	Blue Jays	3–5	Thornton (1–0)	**Minter** (1–1)	Romano (1)	21,688	17–18	L1
36	May 12	Blue Jays	1–4	Ryu (3–2)	**Jackson** (1–1)	Cole (1)	21,171	17–19	L2
37	May 13	Blue Jays	4–8	Bergen (1–0)	**Smith** (0–3)	—	21,653	17–20	L3
38	May 14	@ Brewers	6–3	**Smyly** (2–2)	Houser (3–4)	—	12,130	18–20	W1
39	May 15	@ Brewers	5–1	**Anderson** (3–1)	Anderson (2–3)	—	16,344	19–20	W2
40	May 16	@ Brewers	9–10	Peralta (4–1)	**Ynoa** (4–2)	Hader (9)	16,044	19–21	L1
41	May 17	Mets	1–3	Reid-Foley (1–0)	**Fried** (1–2)	Díaz (6)	22,691	19–22	L1
42	May 18	Mets	3–4	Familia (2–0)	**Smith** (0–4)	Díaz (7)	21,667	19–23	L2
43	May 19	Mets	5–4	**Smith** (1–4)	Barnes (1–1)	—	22,619	20–23	W1
44	May 20	Pirates	4–6 (10)	Rodríguez (3–0)	**Webb** (1–2)	—	21,430	20–24	L1
45	May 21	Pirates	20–1	**Anderson** (4–1)	Anderson (3–4)	—	37,545	21–24	W1
46	May 22	Pirates	6–1	**Wilson** (2–2)	Keller (2–6)	—	40,068	22–24	W2
47	May 23	Pirates	7–1	**Fried** (2–2)	Brubaker (3–4)	—	39,874	23–24	W3
48	May 25	@ Red Sox	3–1	**Morton** (3–2)	Richards (4–3)	**Smith** (8)	9,357	24–24	W4
49	May 26	@ Red Sox	5–9	Pivetta (6–0)	**Smyly** (2–3)	—	9,197	24–25	L1
—	May 28	@ Mets	Postponed (Rain, Makeup: June 21)						
50	May 29	@ Mets	2–13	Walker (4–1)	**Anderson** (4–2)	—	10,251	24–26	L2
—	May 30	@ Mets	Postponed (Rain, Makeup: July 26)						
51	May 31	Nationals	5–3	**Morton** (4–2)	Ross (2–5)	**Smith** (9)	37,668	25–26	W1

June: 13–15 (Home: 7–7; Away: 6–8)

#	Date	Opponent	Score	Win	Loss	Save	Attendance	Record	Box/Streak
52	June 1	Nationals	6–11	Voth (2–0)	**Fried** (2–3)	—	24,083	25–27	L1
53	June 2	Nationals	3–5	Hudson (4–1)	**Minter** (1–2)	Hand (9)	32,752	25–28	L2
54	June 3	Nationals	5–1	**Tomlin** (3–0)	Corbin (3–5)	—	25,595	26–28	W1
55	June 4	Dodgers	5–9	Urías (8–2)	**Anderson** (4–3)	—	40,514	26–29	L1
56	June 5	Dodgers	6–4	**Morton** (5–2)	Kershaw (7–5)	**Smith** (10)	41,136	27–29	W1
57	June 6	Dodgers	4–2	**Fried** (3–3)	Bauer (6–4)	**Smith** (11)	39,439	28–29	W2
58	June 8	@ Phillies	9–5	**Newcomb** (2–0)	Brogdon (4–2)	—	13,125	29–29	W3
59	June 9	@ Phillies	1–2	Suárez (2–0)	**Smith** (1–5)	—	13,552	29–30	L1
60	June 10	@ Phillies	3–4 (10)	Alvarado (5–0)	**Martin** (0–2)	—	14,261	29–31	L2
61	June 11	@ Marlins	3–4	Alcántara (4–5)	**Morton** (5–3)	García (11)	6,595	29–32	L3
62	June 12	@ Marlins	2–4	Thompson (1–1)	**Fried** (3–4)	Floro (2)	8,158	29–33	L4
63	June 13	@ Marlins	6–4	**Smyly** (3–3)	López (2–4)	**Smith** (12)	8,448	30–33	W1
64	June 15	Red Sox	8–10	Sawamura (3–0)	**Martin** (0–3)	Barnes (15)	36,638	30–34	L1
65	June 16	Red Sox	8–10	Ríos (1–0)	**Greene** (0–1)	Ottavino (4)	39,847	30–35	L2
66	June 17	Cardinals	4–0	**Morton** (6–3)	Gant (4–5)	—	33,412	31–35	W1
67	June 18	Cardinals	9–1	**Fried** (4–4)	Martínez (3–8)	—	40,377	32–35	W2
—	June 19	Cardinals	Postponed (rain, makeup June 20)						
68	June 20 (1)	Cardinals	1–9 (7)	Wainwright (5–5)	**Wilson** (2–3)	—	33,781	32–36	L1
69	June 20 (2)	Cardinals	1–0 (7)	**Smyly** (4–3)	Kim (1–5)	**Smith** (13)	36,977	33–36	W1
70	June 21 (1)	@ Mets	2–4 (7)	deGrom (7–2)	**Muller** (0–1)	Díaz (15)	N/A	33–37	L1
71	June 21 (2)	@ Mets	1–0 (7)	**Anderson** (5–3)	Castro (2–2)	**Smith** (14)	18,698	34–37	W1
72	June 22	@ Mets	3–0	**Morton** (7–3)	Díaz (0–1)	**Smith** (15)	17,063	35–37	W2
73	June 23	@ Mets	3–7	Oswalt (1–0)	**Wright** (0–1)	Díaz (16)	15,645	35–38	L1
74	June 24	@ Reds	3–5	Santillan (1–1)	**Chavez** (0–1)	Brach (1)	23,941	35–39	L2
75	June 25	@ Reds	3–2	**Smyly** (5–3)	Gutiérrez (3–2)	**Smith** (16)	30,231	36–39	W1
76	June 26	@ Reds	1–4	Castillo (3–10)	**Anderson** (5–4)	Garrett (5)	34,671	36–40	L1
77	June 27	@ Reds	4–0	**Muller** (1–1)	Mahle (7–3)	—	21,696	37–40	W1
78	June 29	Mets	3–4	Smith (3–1)	**Minter** (1–3)	Díaz (17)	29,274	37–41	L1
79	June 30	Mets	20–2	**Fried** (5–4)	Peterson (2–6)	—	28,405	38–41	W1

July: 14–12 (Home: 6–5; Away: 8–7)

#	Date	Opponent	Score	Win	Loss	Save	Attendance	Record	Box/Streak
80	July 1	Mets	4–3	**Smith** (2–5)	Lugo (1–1)	—	35,777	39–41	W2
81	July 2	Marlins	1–0	**Smyly** (6–3)	López (4–5)	**Smith** (17)	38,203	40–41	W3
82	July 3	Marlins	2–3	Alcántara (5–7)	**Muller** (1–2)	García (13)	38,526	40–42	L1
83	July 4	Marlins	8–7 (10)	**Smith** (3–5)	Bass (1–4)	—	34,485	41–42	W1
84	July 5	@ Pirates	1–11	De Jong (1–3)	**Fried** (5–5)	—	11,600	41–43	L1
85	July 6	@ Pirates	1–2	Rodríguez (4–1)	**Matzek** (0–3)	—	10,844	41–44	L2
86	July 7	@ Pirates	14–3	**Smyly** (7–3)	Crick (1–1)	—	10,094	42–44	W1
87	July 9	@ Marlins	5–0	**Morton** (8–3)	Bass (1–5)	—	7,446	43–44	W2
88	July 10	@ Marlins	5–4	**Fried** (6–5)	Rogers (7–6)	**Smith** (18)	12,178	44–44	W3
89	July 11	@ Marlins	4–7	López (5–5)	**Anderson** (5–5)	—	9,456	44–45	L1
–	July 13	**91st All-Star Game: Denver, CO**							
90	July 16	Rays	6–7 (10)	Wisler (2–3)	**Chavez** (0–2)	Fairbanks (4)	40,485	44–46	L2
91	July 17	Rays	9–0	**Fried** (7–5)	Fleming (7–5)	—	40,868	45–46	W1
92	July 18	Rays	5–7	Springs (5–1)	**Minter** (1–4)	Fairbanks (5)	34,544	45–47	L1
—	July 19	Padres	Postponed (Rain, Makeup: July 21)						
93	July 20	Padres	2–1	**Toussaint** (1–0)	Darvish (7–4)	**Smith** (19)	36,621	46–47	W1
94	July 21 (1)	Padres	2–3 (7)	Paddack (6–6)	**Muller** (1–3)	Melancon (28)	28,621	46–48	L1
—	July 21 (2)	Padres	Suspended (Rain, Makeup: September 24)						
95	July 22	@ Phillies	7–2	**Morton** (9–3)	Moore (0–2)	—	22,645	47–48	W1
96	July 23	@ Phillies	1–5	Wheeler (8–5)	**Fried** (7–6)	—	23,546	47–49	L1
97	July 24	@ Phillies	15–3	**Tomlin** (4–0)	Velasquez (3–5)	—	24,479	48–49	W1
98	July 25	@ Phillies	1–2	Nola (7–6)	**Toussaint** (1–1)	Suárez (4)	19,370	48–50	L1
99	July 26 (1)	@ Mets	2–0 (7)	**Muller** (2–3)	Stroman (7–9)	**Smith** (20)	N/A	49–50	W1
100	July 26 (2)	@ Mets	0–1 (7)	May (3–2)	**Jackson** (1–2)	Díaz (22)	24,384	49–51	L1
101	July 27	@ Mets	12–5	**Morton** (10–3)	Eickhoff (0–2)	—	24,000	50–51	W1
102	July 28	@ Mets	1–2	May (4–2)	**Fried** (7–7)	Díaz (23)	25,787	50–52	L1
103	July 29	@ Mets	6–3	**Chavez** (1–2)	Walker (7–5)	**Smith** (21)	26,080	51–52	W1
104	July 30	Brewers	5–9	Boxberger (4–2)	**Toussaint** (1–2)	—	38,680	51–53	L1
105	July 31	Brewers	8–1	**Chavez** (2–2)	Woodruff (7–6)	—	39,088	52–53	W1

August: 18–8 (Home: 6–6; Away: 12–2)

#	Date	Opponent	Score	Win	Loss	Save	Attendance	Record	Box/Streak
106	August 1	Brewers	1–2	Anderson (4–5)	**Morton** (10–4)	Hader (22)	33,469	52–54	L1
107	August 3	@ Cardinals	6–1	**Fried** (8–7)	Lester (3–6)	—	31,509	53–54	W1
108	August 4	@ Cardinals	7–4	**Martin** (1–3)	Gallegos (5–4)	**Smith** (22)	32,205	54–54	W2
109	August 5	@ Cardinals	8–4	**Santana** (1–0)	Gallegos (5–5)	—	30,549	55–54	W3
110	August 6	Nationals	8–4	**Santana** (2–0)	Fedde (4–8)	—	34,454	56–54	W4
111	August 7	Nationals	2–3	Machado (1–0)	**Smith** (3–6)	Finnegan (3)	38,300	56–55	L1
112	August 8	Nationals	5–4	**Fried** (9–7)	Corbin (6–11)	**Martin** (1)	29,101	57–55	W1
113	August 10	Reds	3–2	**Smyly** (8–3)	Hembree (2–7)	**Smith** (23)	24,432	58–55	W2
114	August 11	Reds	8–6 (11)	**Santana** (3–0)	Sims (4–2)	—	23,375	59–55	W3
115	August 12	Reds	3–12	Gutiérrez (8–3)	**Muller** (2–4)	—	23,395	59–56	L1
116	August 13	@ Nationals	4–2	**Morton** (11–4)	Gray (0–1)	**Smith** (24)	24,812	60–56	W1
117	August 14	@ Nationals	12–2	**Fried** (10–7)	Corbin (6–12)	—	27,959	61–56	W2
118	August 15	@ Nationals	6–5	**Chavez** (3–2)	Espino (3–4)	**Smith** (25)	27,488	62–56	W3
119	August 16	@ Marlins	12–2	**Toussaint** (2–2)	Garrett (1–2)	—	6,442	63–56	W4
120	August 17	@ Marlins	2–0	**Martin** (2–3)	Alcántara (7–11)	**Smith** (26)	6,079	64–56	W5
121	August 18	@ Marlins	11–9	**Morton** (12–4)	Luzardo (4–6)	—	6,871	65–56	W6
122	August 20	@ Orioles	3–0	**Fried** (11–7)	Akin (0–8)	—	13,583	66–56	W7
123	August 21	@ Orioles	5–4	**Smyly** (9–3)	Harvey (6–13)	**Smith** (27)	15,774	67–56	W8
124	August 22	@ Orioles	3–1	**Toussaint** (3–2)	Means (5–6)	**Smith** (28)	11,180	68–56	W9
125	August 23	Yankees	1–5	Montgomery (5–5)	**Ynoa** (4–3)	—	39,176	68–57	L1
126	August 24	Yankees	4–5	Holmes (5–2)	**Morton** (12–5)	Peralta (5)	37,426	68–58	L2
127	August 27	Giants	6–5	**Minter** (2–4)	Watson (5–4)	**Smith** (29)	35,586	69–58	W1
128	August 28	Giants	0–5	Webb (8–3)	**Ynoa** (4–4)	—	39,558	69–59	L1
129	August 29	Giants	9–0	**Anderson** (6–5)	DeSclafani (11–6)	—	28,820	70–59	W1
130	August 30	@ Dodgers	3–5	Urías (15–3)	**Smyly** (9–4)	Treinen (5)	49,410	70–60	L1
131	August 31	@ Dodgers	2–3	Treinen (5–5)	**Matzek** (0–4)	Jansen (30)	44,952	70–61	L2

September: 16–11 (Home: 7–5; Away: 9–6)

#	Date	Opponent	Score	Win	Loss	Save	Attendance	Record	Box/Streak
132	September 1	@ Dodgers	3–4	Bickford (3–1)	**Martin** (2–4)	Kelly (2)	47,473	70–62	L3
133	September 2	@ Rockies	6–5	**Webb** (2–2)	Almonte (1–3)	**Smith** (30)	21,481	71–62	W1
134	September 3	@ Rockies	3–4	Senzatela (4–9)	**Ynoa** (4–5)	Estévez (4)	24,371	71–63	L1
135	September 4	@ Rockies	6–7	Kinley (3–2)	**Minter** (2–5)	Estévez (5)	35,351	71–64	L2
136	September 5	@ Rockies	9–2	**Morton** (13–5)	Feltner (0–1)	—	33,957	72–64	W1
137	September 7	Nationals	8–5	**Jackson** (2–2)	Harper (0–2)	**Smith** (31)	20,544	73–64	W2
138	September 8	Nationals	2–4	Voth (4–1)	**Rodríguez** (4–3)	Finnegan (8)	20,074	73–65	L1
139	September 9	Nationals	7–6 (10)	**Webb** (3–2)	Suero (2–3)	—	23,657	74–65	W1
140	September 10	Marlins	6–2	**Anderson** (7–5)	Rogers (7–7)	—	33,850	75–65	W2
141	September 11	Marlins	4–6	Bass (3–7)	**Rodríguez** (4–4)	Floro (10)	35,250	75–66	L1
142	September 12	Marlins	5–3	**Webb** (4–2)	Bass (3–8)	**Smith** (32)	27,847	76–66	W1
143	September 14	Rockies	4–5	Gray (8–10)	**Toussaint** (3–3)	Estévez (8)	22,579	76–67	L1
144	September 15	Rockies	2–3 (10)	Estévez (3–4)	**Minter** (2–6)	Stephenson (1)	21,382	76–68	L2
—	September 16	Rockies	Cancelled (Rain)						
145	September 17	@ Giants	5–6 (10)	Doval (4–1)	**Webb** (4–3)	—	26,644	76–69	L3
146	September 18	@ Giants	0–2	Littell (4–0)	**Morton** (13–6)	Leone (2)	31,058	76–70	L4
147	September 19	@ Giants	3–0	**Fried** (12–7)	DeSclafani (12–7)	**Smith** (33)	32,210	77–70	W1
148	September 20	@ Diamondbacks	11–4	**Webb** (5–3)	Mejía (0–2)	—	9,642	78–70	W2
149	September 21	@ Diamondbacks	6–1	**Smyly** (10–4)	Weaver (3–6)	—	8,879	79–70	W3
150	September 22	@ Diamondbacks	9–2	**Anderson** (8–5)	Kelly (7–11)	—	10,631	80–70	W4
151	September 23	@ Diamondbacks	4–6	Poppen (1–0)	**Webb** (5–4)	Wendelken (2)	6,880	80–71	L1
152	September 24 (1)	Padres	5–6 (7)	Hudson (5–1)	**Smith** (3–6)	Melancon (29)	N/A	80–72	L2
153	September 24 (2)	@ Padres	4–0	**Fried** (13–7)	Knehr (1–1)	—	33,265	81–72	W1
154	September 25	@ Padres	10–8 (10)	**Rodríguez** (5–4)	Hudson (5–3)	**Smith** (34)	39,026	82–72	W2
155	September 26	@ Padres	4–3	**Minter** (3–6)	Johnson (3–4)	**Smith** (35)	41,294	83–72	W3
156	September 28	Phillies	2–1	**Morton** (14–6)	Wheeler (14–10)	**Smith** (36)	29,238	84–72	W4
157	September 29	Phillies	7–2	**Fried** (14–7)	Nola (9–9)	—	27,664	85–72	W5
158	September 30	Phillies	5–3	**Anderson** (9–5)	Gibson (10–9)	**Smith** (37)	38,235	86–72	W6

October: 2–1 (Home: 2–1; Away: 0–0)

#	Date	Opponent	Score	Win	Loss	Save	Attendance	Record	Box/Streak
159	October 1	Mets	3–4	Megill (4–6)	**Ynoa** (4–6)	Díaz (32)	32,659	86–73	L1
160	October 2	Mets	6–5	**Smyly** (11–4)	Carrasco (1–5)	**Webb** (1)	37,616	87–73	W1
161	October 3	Mets	5–0	**Strider** (1–0)	Syndergaard (0–1)	—	33,202	88–73	W2

Legend: = Win = Loss = Postponement
Bold = Braves team member

== Player stats ==
=== Batting ===
Note: G = Games played; AB = At bats; R = Runs; H = Hits; 2B = Doubles; 3B = Triples; HR = Home runs; RBI = Runs batted in; SB = Stolen bases; BB = Walks; AVG = Batting average; SLG = Slugging average

Player	G	AB	R	H	2B	3B	HR	RBI	SB	BB	AVG	SLG
Ozzie Albies	156	629	103	163	40	7	30	106	20	47	.259	.488
Freddie Freeman	159	600	120	180	25	2	31	83	8	85	.300	.503
Austin Riley	160	590	91	179	33	1	33	107	0	52	.303	.531
Dansby Swanson	160	588	78	146	33	2	27	88	9	52	.248	.449
Guillermo Heredia	120	305	46	67	26	0	5	26	0	32	.220	.354
Ronald Acuña Jr.	82	297	72	84	19	1	24	52	17	49	.283	.596
Travis d'Arnaud	60	209	21	46	14	0	7	26	0	17	.220	.388
Jorge Soler	55	208	36	56	11	0	14	33	0	29	.269	.524
Adam Duvall	55	199	26	45	7	1	16	45	0	14	.226	.513
Marcell Ozuna	48	188	21	40	6	0	7	26	0	19	.213	.356
Ehire Adrianza	109	182	32	45	9	2	5	28	0	21	.247	.401
Joc Pederson	64	173	20	43	8	1	7	22	0	17	.249	.428
William Contreras	52	163	19	35	4	1	8	23	0	19	.215	.399
Abraham Almonte	64	148	20	32	12	0	5	19	1	26	.216	.399
Eddie Rosario	33	96	13	26	4	2	7	16	2	9	.271	.573
Kevan Smith	30	91	6	15	3	0	0	3	0	10	.165	.198
Ender Inciarte	52	79	11	17	2	0	2	10	1	7	.215	.316
Stephen Vogt	26	78	7	13	0	0	2	8	0	8	.167	.244
Pablo Sandoval	69	73	11	13	0	0	4	11	0	11	.178	.342
Orlando Arcia	32	70	9	15	3	0	2	13	1	7	.214	.343
Cristian Pache	22	63	6	7	3	0	1	4	0	2	.111	.206
Alex Jackson	10	23	2	1	0	0	0	0	0	2	.043	.043
Johan Camargo	15	16	1	0	0	0	0	0	0	2	.000	.000
Jeff Mathis	3	9	0	0	0	0	0	0	0	0	.000	.000
Jonathan Lucroy	2	5	2	1	0	0	0	1	0	3	.200	.200
Sean Kazmar Jr.	3	2	0	0	0	0	0	0	0	0	.000	.000
Pitcher totals	161	279	17	38	7	0	2	12	0	9	.136	.183
Team totals	161	5363	790	1307	269	20	239	762	59	549	.244	.435

=== Pitching ===
Note: W = Wins; L = Losses; ERA = Earned run average; G = Games pitched; GS = Games started; SV = Saves; IP = Innings pitched; H = Hits allowed; R = Runs allowed; ER = Earned runs allowed; BB = Walks allowed; SO = Strikeouts

Player	W	L	ERA	G	GS	SV	IP	H	R	ER	BB	SO
Charlie Morton	14	6	3.34	33	33	0	185.2	136	77	69	58	216
Max Fried	14	7	3.04	28	28	0	165.2	139	61	56	41	158
Ian Anderson	9	5	3.58	24	24	0	128.1	105	51	51	53	124
Drew Smyly	11	4	4.48	29	23	0	126.2	133	69	63	41	117
Huascar Ynoa	4	6	4.05	18	17	0	91.0	76	42	41	25	100
Will Smith	3	7	3.44	71	0	37	68.0	49	27	26	28	87
Luke Jackson	2	2	1.98	71	0	0	63.2	45	15	14	29	70
Tyler Matzek	0	4	2.57	69	0	0	63.0	40	19	18	37	77
A. J. Minter	3	6	3.78	61	0	0	52.1	44	27	22	20	57
Touki Toussaint	3	3	4.50	11	10	0	50.0	43	28	25	22	48
Josh Tomlin	4	0	6.57	35	0	0	49.1	69	36	36	5	37
Chris Martin	2	4	3.95	46	0	1	43.1	49	20	19	6	33
Edgar Santana	3	0	3.59	41	0	0	42.2	37	20	17	12	33
Kyle Muller	2	4	4.17	9	8	0	36.2	26	17	17	20	37
Jacob Webb	5	4	4.19	34	0	1	34.1	38	22	16	14	33
Bryse Wilson	2	3	5.88	8	8	0	33.2	45	23	22	12	23
Jesse Chavez	3	2	2.14	30	4	0	33.2	23	9	8	11	36
Sean Newcomb	2	0	4.73	32	0	1	32.1	28	17	17	27	43
Richard Rodríguez	1	2	3.12	27	0	0	26.0	23	9	9	5	9
Tucker Davidson	0	0	3.60	4	4	0	20.0	15	8	8	8	18
Shane Greene	0	1	8.47	19	0	0	17.0	22	16	16	9	17
Grant Dayton	0	0	6.23	13	0	0	13.0	15	10	9	6	14
Jesse Biddle	0	0	8.44	8	0	0	10.2	10	10	10	8	11
Nate Jones	0	2	3.48	12	0	0	10.1	8	6	4	10	7
Kyle Wright	0	1	9.95	2	2	0	6.1	7	7	7	5	6
Spencer Strider	1	0	3.86	2	0	0	2.1	2	1	1	1	0
Dylan Lee	0	0	9.00	2	0	0	2.0	3	2	2	0	3
Jay Flaa	0	0	27.00	1	0	0	1.1	3	4	4	1	2
Ty Tice	0	0	0.00	1	0	0	1.0	1	0	0	1	0
Carl Edwards Jr.	0	0	81.00	1	0	0	0.1	3	3	3	1	1
Team totals	88	73	3.88	161	161	40	1410.2	1237	656	608	516	1417

== Postseason ==
=== Game log ===
2021 postseason game log: 11–5 (Home: 7–1; Away: 4–4)
NLDS: 3–1 (Home: 2–0; Away: 1–1)

#	Date	Opponent	Score	Win	Loss	Save	Attendance	Record	Box/Streak
1	October 8	@ Brewers	1–2	Houser (1–0)	Morton (0–1)	Hader (1)	40,852	0–1	L1
2	October 9	@ Brewers	3–0	Fried (1–0)	Woodruff (0–1)	Smith (1)	43,812	1–1	W1
3	October 11	Brewers	3–0	Anderson (1–0)	Houser (1–1)	Smith (2)	41,479	2–1	W2
4	October 12	Brewers	5–4	Matzek (1–0)	Hader (0–1)	Smith (3)	40,195	3–1	W3

NLCS: 4–2 (Home: 3–0; Away: 1–2)

#	Date	Opponent	Score	Win	Loss	Save	Attendance	Record	Box/Streak
1	October 16	Dodgers	3–2	Smith (1–0)	Treinen (0–1)	—	41,815	1–0	W1
2	October 17	Dodgers	5–4	Smith (2–0)	Graterol (0–1)	—	41,873	2–0	W2
3	October 19	@ Dodgers	5–6	Gonsolin (1–0)	Jackson (0–1)	Jansen (1)	51,307	2–1	L1
4	October 20	@ Dodgers	9–2	Smyly (1–0)	Urías (0–1)	—	53,025	3–1	W1
5	October 21	@ Dodgers	2–11	Phillips (1–0)	Fried (0–1)	—	51,363	3–2	L1
6	October 23	Dodgers	4–2	Minter (1–0)	Buehler (0–1)	Smith (1)	43,060	4–2	W1

WS: 4–2 (Home: 2–1; Away: 2–1)

#	Date	Opponent	Score	Win	Loss	Save	Attendance	Record	Box/Streak
1	October 26	@ Astros	6–2	Minter (1–0)	Valdez (0–1)	—	42,285	1–0	W1
2	October 27	@ Astros	2–7	Urquidy (1–0)	Fried (0–1)	—	42,833	1–1	L1
3	October 29	Astros	2–0	Anderson (1–0)	García (0–1)	Smith (1)	42,898	2–1	W1
4	October 30	Astros	3–2	Matzek (1–0)	Javier (0–1)	Smith (2)	43,125	3–1	W2
5	October 31	Astros	5–9	Urquidy (2–0)	Minter (1–1)	—	43,122	3–2	L1
6	November 2	@ Astros	7–0	Fried (1–1)	García (0–2)	—	42,868	4–2	W1

=== Postseason rosters ===
Playoff rosters
National League Division Series

- Pitchers: 18 Drew Smyly 19 Huascar Ynoa 33 A. J. Minter 36 Ian Anderson 50 Charlie Morton 51 Will Smith 54 Max Fried 60 Jesse Chavez 68 Tyler Matzek 71 Jacob Webb 74 Dylan Lee 77 Luke Jackson
- Catchers: 16 Travis d'Arnaud 24 William Contreras
- Infielders: 1 Ozzie Albies 5 Freddie Freeman 7 Dansby Swanson 9 Orlando Arcia 27 Austin Riley
- Outfielders: 8 Eddie Rosario 11 Terrance Gore 12 Jorge Soler (Games 1–3) 14 Adam Duvall 22 Joc Pederson 23 Ehire Adrianza 25 Cristian Pache (Games 4) 38 Guillermo Heredia

National League Championship Series

- Pitchers: 18 Drew Smyly 19 Huascar Ynoa (Games 1–3) 33 A. J. Minter 36 Ian Anderson 50 Charlie Morton 51 Will Smith 54 Max Fried 55 Chris Martin 60 Jesse Chavez 68 Tyler Matzek 71 Jacob Webb 74 Dylan Lee (Games 4–6) 77 Luke Jackson
- Catchers: 16 Travis d'Arnaud 24 William Contreras
- Infielders: 1 Ozzie Albies 5 Freddie Freeman 7 Dansby Swanson 9 Orlando Arcia 17 Johan Camargo 23 Ehire Adrianza 27 Austin Riley
- Outfielders: 8 Eddie Rosario 12 Jorge Soler (Games 5–6) 14 Adam Duvall 22 Joc Pederson 25 Cristian Pache (Games 1–4) 38 Guillermo Heredia

World Series

- Pitchers: 18 Drew Smyly 30 Kyle Wright 33 A. J. Minter 36 Ian Anderson 50 Charlie Morton (Game 1) 51 Will Smith 54 Max Fried 55 Chris Martin 60 Jesse Chavez 64 Tucker Davidson (Games 2–6) 68 Tyler Matzek 74 Dylan Lee 77 Luke Jackson
- Catchers: 16 Travis d'Arnaud 24 William Contreras
- Infielders: 1 Ozzie Albies 5 Freddie Freeman 7 Dansby Swanson 9 Orlando Arcia 17 Johan Camargo (Game 6) 23 Ehire Adrianza (Games 1–5) 27 Austin Riley
- Outfielders: 8 Eddie Rosario 11 Terrance Gore 12 Jorge Soler 14 Adam Duvall 22 Joc Pederson 38 Guillermo Heredia

== Roster ==
2021 Atlanta Braves
Roster
Pitchers: 36 Ian Anderson; 60 Jesse Biddle; 60 Jesse Chavez; 64 Tucker Davidson; 75 Grant Dayton; 56 Carl Edwards Jr.; 78 Jay Flaa; 54 Max Fried; 61 Shane Greene; 77 Luke Jackson; 49 Nate Jones; 74 Dylan Lee; 55 Chris Martin; 68 Tyler Matzek; 33 A. J. Minter; 50 Charlie Morton; 66 Kyle Muller; 15 Sean Newcomb; 48 Richard Rodríguez; 67 Edgar Santana; 51 Will Smith; 18 Drew Smyly; 65 Spencer Strider; 65 Ty Tice; 32 Josh Tomlin; 62 Touki Toussaint; 71 Jacob Webb; 46 Bryse Wilson; 30 Kyle Wright; 19 Huascar Ynoa	Catchers: 24 William Contreras; 16 Travis d'Arnaud; 12 Alex Jackson; 14 Jonathan Lucroy; 45 Jeff Mathis; 52 Kevan Smith; 26 Stephen Vogt; Infielders: 23 Ehire Adrianza; 1 Ozzie Albies; 17 Johan Camargo; 5 Freddie Freeman; 27 Austin Riley; 48 Pablo Sandoval; 7 Dansby Swanson	Outfielders: 13 Ronald Acuña Jr.; 34 Abraham Almonte; 9 Orlando Arcia; 14 Adam Duvall; 38 Guillermo Heredia; 11 Ender Inciarte; 20 Marcell Ozuna; 25 Cristian Pache; 22 Joc Pederson; 8 Eddie Rosario; 12 Jorge Soler; Other batters: 53 Sean Kazmar Jr.	Manager: 43 Brian Snitker; Coaches: 59 José Castro (assistant hitting); 57 Sal Fasano (catching coach); 58 Drew French (bullpen); 10 Chipper Jones (hitting consultant); 39 Rick Kranitz (pitching); 97 Jimmy Leo (bullpen catcher); 70 Bobby Magallanes (assistant hitting); 95 Eddie Pérez (assistant); 98 Tomás Pérez (batting practice pitcher); 28 Kevin Seitzer (hitting); 37 Ron Washington (third base); 4 Walt Weiss (bench); 99 José Yepez (bullpen catcher); 2 Eric Young (first base)

== Farm system ==
Level	Team	League	Manager
AAA	Gwinnett Stripers	Triple-A East	Matt Tuiasosopo
AA	Mississippi Braves	Double-A South	Wyatt Toregas
A-Advanced	Rome Braves	High-A East	Kanekoa Texeira
A	Augusta GreenJackets	Low-A East	Michael Saunders
Rookie	FCL Braves	Florida Complex League	Nestor Pérez
Rookie	DSL Braves	Dominican Summer League	
