= Johan Camargo =

Panamanian baseball player (born 1993)

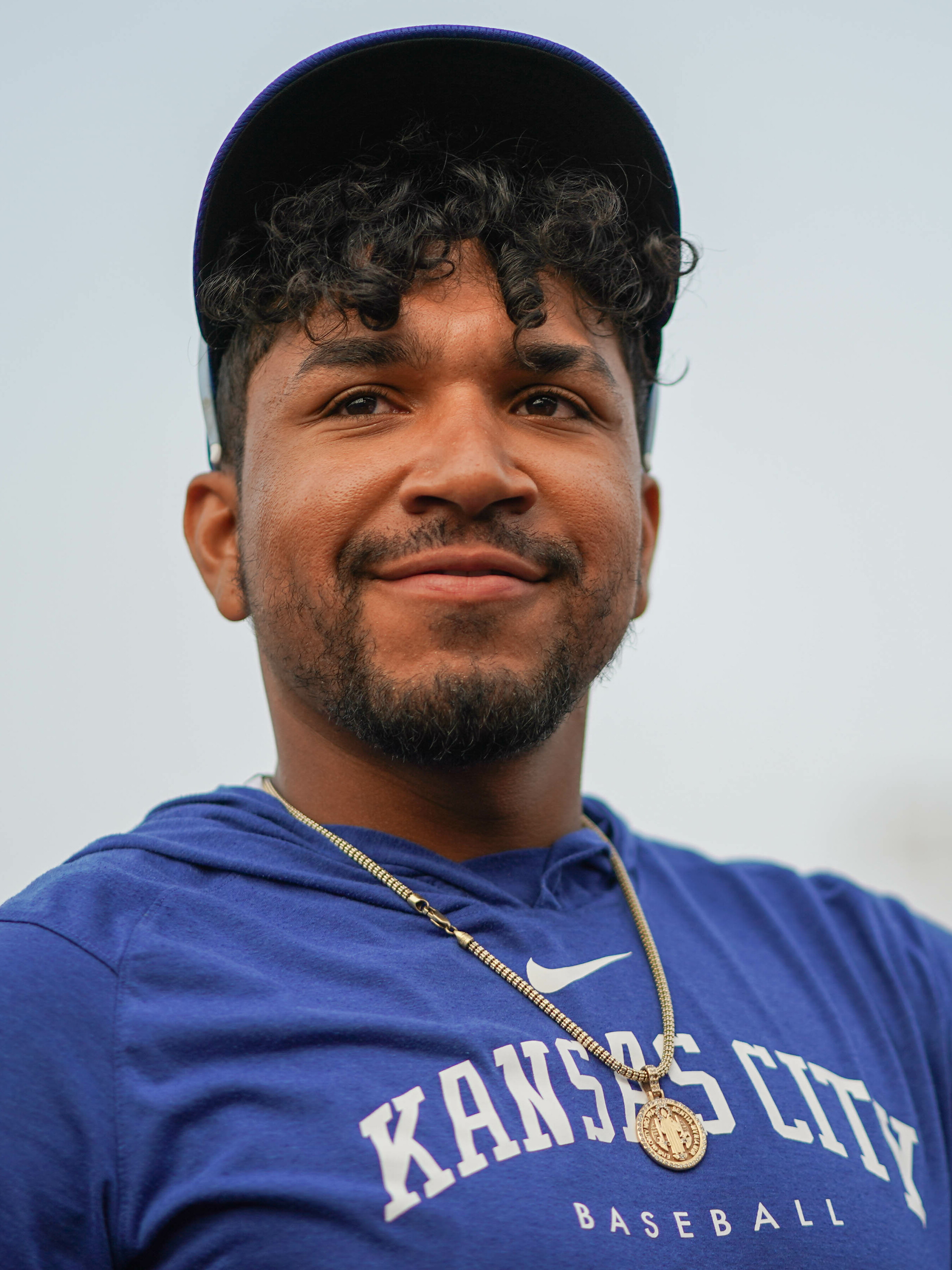
- Camargo with the Omaha Storm Chasers in 2023

Conspiradores de Querétaro
- Infielder
- Born: December 13, 1993 (age 32); Panama City, Panama
- Bats: Switch Throws: Right

MLB debut
- April 11, 2017, for the Atlanta Braves

MLB statistics (through 2023 season)
- Batting average: .254
- Home runs: 37
- Runs batted in: 161
- Stats at Baseball Reference

Teams
- Atlanta Braves (2017–2021); Philadelphia Phillies (2022); San Francisco Giants (2023)

Johan Valentín Camargo Ramos (born December 13, 1993) is a Panamanian professional baseball infielder for the Conspiradores de Querétaro of the Mexican League. He has previously played in Major League Baseball (MLB) for the Atlanta Braves, Philadelphia Phillies, and San Francisco Giants. Camargo signed with the Braves in 2010 as an international free agent.

== Early life ==
Johan Camargo was born in Panama City, Panama. His parents named him after the footballer Johan Cruyff. When playing baseball as a child, Camargo naturally batted and threw left-handed. His father taught him to throw with his right hand, and Camargo stopped using his left hand for that skill. He later focused on switch-hitting, and joined his first organized baseball league at the age of 13.

== Career ==
=== Atlanta Braves ===
==== Minor leagues ====
Camargo signed with the Atlanta Braves for $42,000 as a 16-year old out of Panama in July 2010 as an international free agent. After missing the 2011 season, Camargo made his professional debut in 2012 with the DSL Braves, and batted .343/.433/.455 in 198 at bats. Camargo spent 2013 with Rookie level Danville, and hit .294/.359/.360 in 228 at bats over 57 games, playing shortstop almost exclusively.

Camargo began 2014 at Single-A Rome before earning a late-season promotion to High-A Lynchburg. Across both levels in 2014, he hit .266/.313/.326 with 60 runs and 46 RBIs in 478 at bats over 132 games, playing shortstop.

Camargo spent 2015 with High-A Carolina, hitting .258/.315/.335 with 50 runs and 32 RBIs in 391 at bats over 130 games, playing shortstop. He was named both a mid-season and post-season All-Star in the Carolina League. Camargo was awarded with a spot in the Arizona Fall League with Peoria, where he played in 16 games.

Almost exclusively a shortstop, Camargo began 2016 playing at second base for Double-A Mississippi to accommodate the likes of Ozzie Albies and Dansby Swanson. When all three were on the team, Camargo played third base, and after Swanson was promoted to the major leagues, he took over at shortstop. At the plate, Camargo hit .267.304/.379 with 4 HR, along with 46 runs and 43 RBIs in 446 at bats over 126 games. The Braves added him to their 40-man roster after the season.

==== Major leagues ====
After missing out on the Opening Day roster, Camargo was quickly recalled from Triple-A Gwinnett on April 11, 2017, and made his debut that night. After two short-lived stints in the major leagues, Camargo's playing time increased in the month of June when third baseman Adonis García was placed on the disabled list. Camargo hit his first career home run on July 9, against Washington Nationals pitcher Matt Grace. After Adonis Garcia returned from the disabled list at third base, Camargo lost playing time; however, he quickly gained it back when the Braves benched Dansby Swanson who eventually was demoted to Triple A. Camargo was injured in August, and remained with the Gwinnett Braves until September, resulting in the return of Swanson. With Atlanta in 2017 he batted .299/.331/.452 with 30 runs, 4 home runs, and 27 RBIs in 241 at bats.

Camargo became the Braves' starting third baseman in May 2018, and retained the role until the start of the 2019 season, when the team signed Josh Donaldson. Following an injury to starting shortstop Dansby Swanson, Camargo played at that position, struggling defensively and offensively. As a result, Camargo was demoted to the Gwinnett Stripers on August 16. Camargo returned to the major leagues when rosters expanded in September. In a game against the Philadelphia Phillies on September 11, he suffered a hairline fracture in his right shin. The Braves subsequently placed Camargo on the 10-day injured list. In 2018 with Atlanta he batted .272/.349/.457 with 19 home runs and 76 RBIs in 456 at bats, and his .958 fielding percentage was 9th-best in the NL.

In 2019, he batted .233/.279/.384 with 31 runs, 7 home runs, and 32 RBIs in 232 at bats, and had the slowest sprint speed of all major league shortstops, at 25.6 feet/second. His maximum exit velocity of 114.4 miles per hour was in the top 5% of the league.

In 2020, he batted .200/.244/.367 with 16 runs, 4 home runs, and 9 RBIs in 120 at bats. He played 21 games at second base, and 10 at third base, but did not play at all at shortstop for the first season of his major league career. After the 2020 season, he played for Águilas Cibaeñas of the Dominican Professional Baseball League(LIDOM). He has also played for Dominican Republic in the 2021 Caribbean Series.

Camargo played the majority of the 2021 season with the Gwinnett Stripers, where he learned to play first base; he played primarily first base and third base. With Gwinnett, he batted .326(3rd in the Triple-A East)/.401/.557 with 70 runs (2nd), 4 triples (5th), 19 home runs (7th), 67 RBIs (6th), and 47 walks (7th) in 386 at bats. He was named an MiLB Organization All Star. He had 16 hitless at bats with the Braves in the majors, and was named to the Braves' roster for the National League Championship Series, replacing Terrance Gore. Gore returned to the Braves' roster for the World Series, in place of Camargo. The Braves eventually won the 2021 World Series, giving the Braves their first title since 1995. On November 30, 2021, it was announced that the Braves would not tender a contract to Camargo for the 2022 season, making him a free agent.

=== Philadelphia Phillies ===
On December 1, 2021, Camargo signed a one-year contract with the Philadelphia Phillies. He appeared in 52 games for Philadelphia in 2022, slashing .237/.297/.316 with 3 home runs and 15 RBIs in 152 at bats. He was designated for assignment on September 25, 2022. Camargo cleared waivers and was sent outright to the Triple–A Lehigh Valley IronPigs on September 27. With Lehigh Valley he batted .213/.311/.298 in 141 at bats. He elected free agency following the season on October 6.

=== Kansas City Royals ===
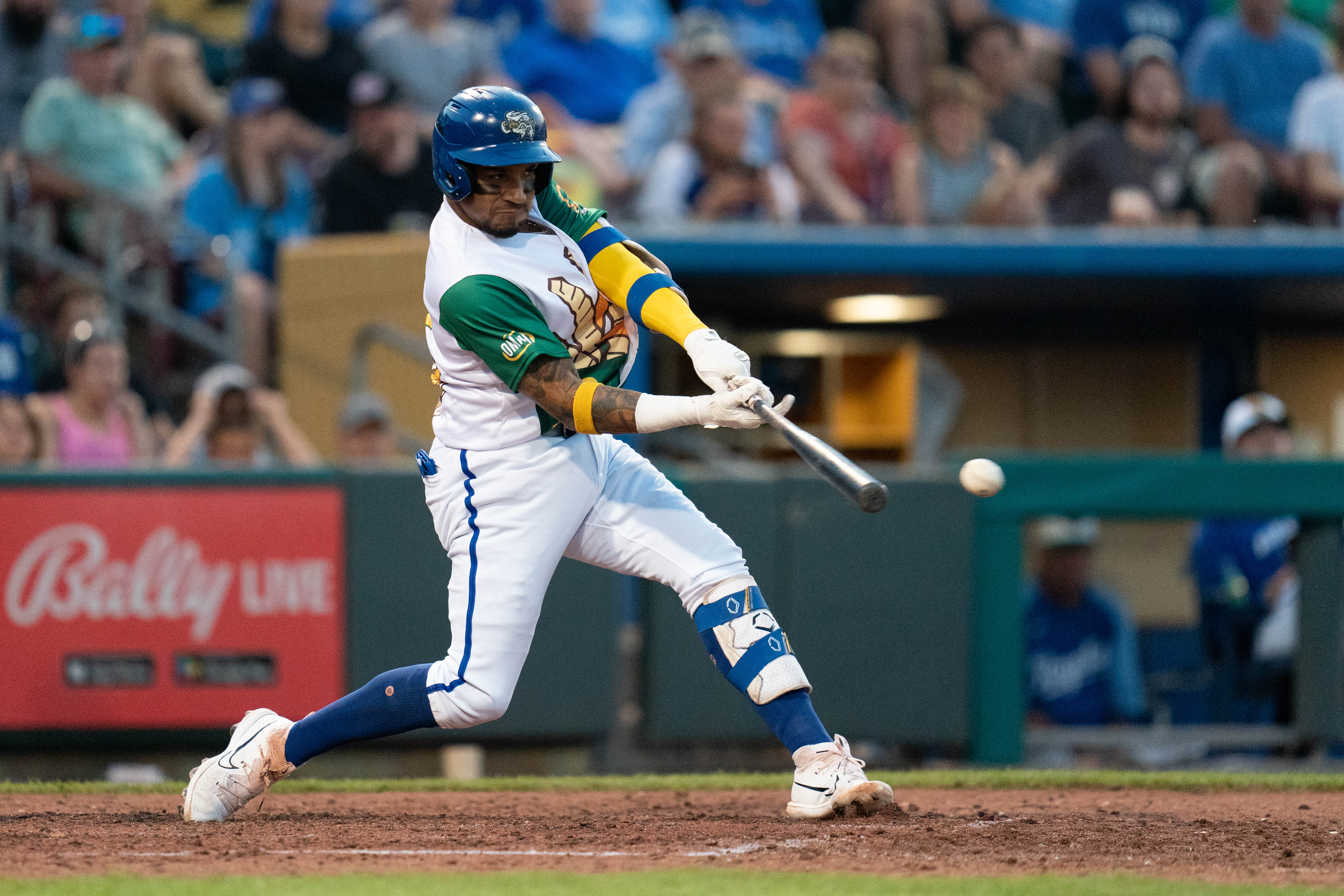
Camargo batting for Omaha in 2023

On January 21, 2023, Camargo signed a minor league contract with the Kansas City Royals organization. Camargo played in 15 games for the Triple–A Omaha Storm Chasers, after a delayed start to the season because of an oblique injury, and hit .298/.412/.544 with 4 home runs and 8 RBIs in 58 at bats. On June 16, Camargo triggered an opt–out in his contract and was released by the Royals.

=== Detroit Tigers ===
On June 23, 2023, Camargo signed a minor league contract with the Detroit Tigers organization and was assigned to the Triple–A Toledo Mud Hens. In 22 games for Toledo, he batted .238/.296/.400 with 3 home runs and 11 RBIs in 80 at bats, playing shortstop and second base. On August 3, Camargo was released by the Tigers.

=== San Francisco Giants ===
On August 11, 2023, Camargo signed a minor league contract with the San Francisco Giants organization. At the time, in his major league career he had played 199 games at third base, 62 games at shortstop, 47 games at second base, 12 games in left field, seven games at first base, and five games in right field, while against lefties he had batted .265/.319/.463 and against righties he had batted .250/.311/.386. After two games for the Triple–A Sacramento River Cats, the Giants selected Camargo's contract, adding him to the major league roster. On August 23, Camargo was designated for assignment after the Giants signed Paul DeJong. In 8 games, he had gone 4–for–18 (.222) He cleared waivers and was outrighted to Triple–A Sacramento on August 25. Camargo was released by the Giants organization on September 12.

=== Tecolotes de los Dos Laredos ===
On May 8, 2025, Camargo signed with the Tecolotes de los Dos Laredos of the Mexican League. In 76 games he hit .301/.367/.445 with 10 home runs and 49 RBIs.

=== Conspiradores de Querétaro ===
On January 23, 2026, Camargo was loaned to the Conspiradores de Querétaro of the Mexican League.
