= Sean Kazmar Jr. =

American baseball player (born 1984)

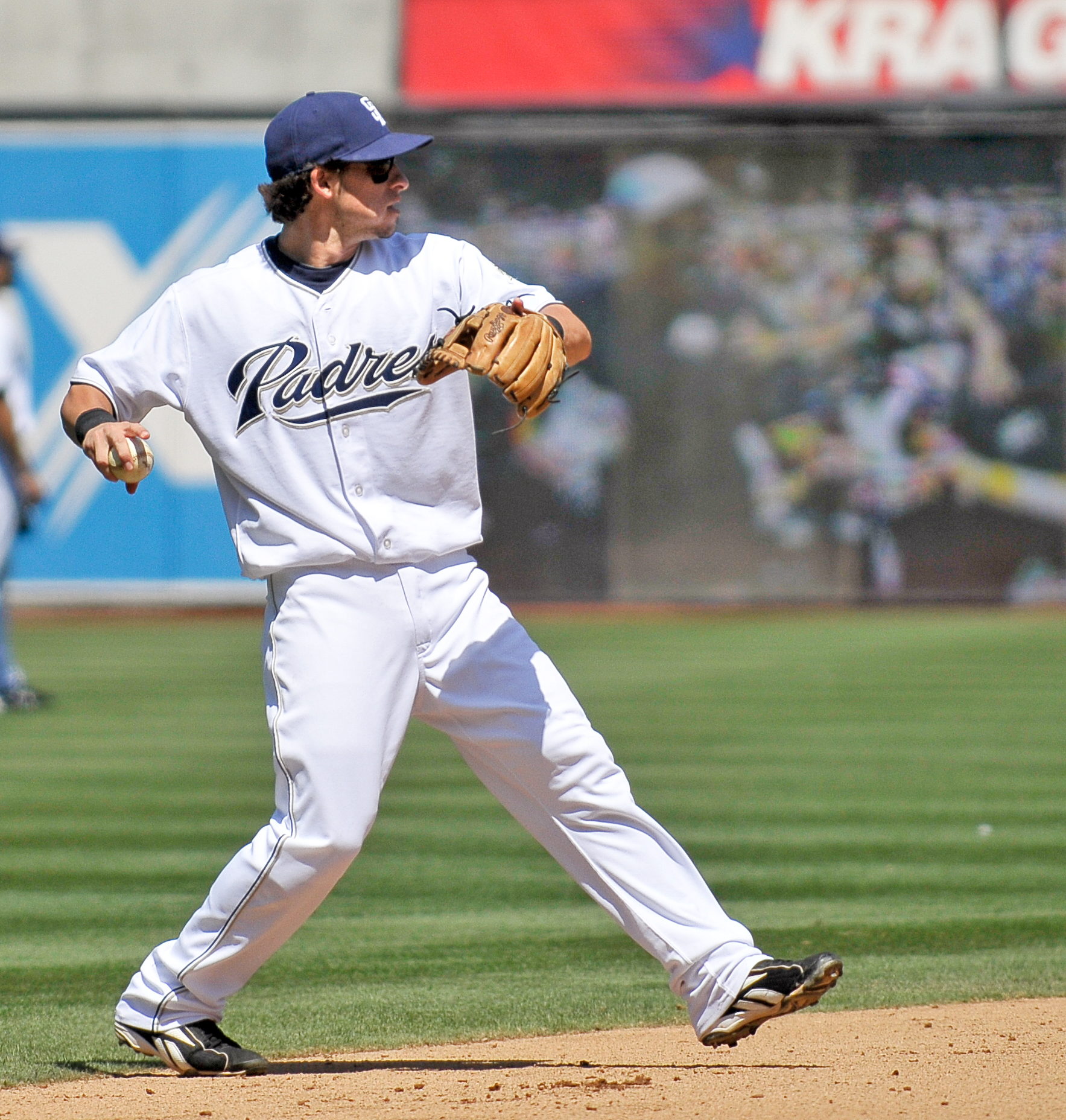
- Kazmar with the San Diego Padres in 2008
- Infielder
- Born: August 5, 1984 (age 41); Valdosta, Georgia, U.S.
- Batted: Right Threw: Right

MLB debut
- August 13, 2008, for the San Diego Padres

Last MLB appearance
- May 5, 2021, for the Atlanta Braves

MLB statistics
- Batting average: .200
- Home runs: 0
- Runs batted in: 2
- Stats at Baseball Reference

Teams
- San Diego Padres (2008); Atlanta Braves (2021)

Sean Frank Kazmar Jr. (born August 5, 1984) is an American former professional baseball infielder. He played in Major League Baseball (MLB) for the San Diego Padres and Atlanta Braves.

== Amateur career ==
Kazmar attended the College of Southern Nevada. In 2003, he played collegiate summer baseball with the Wareham Gatemen of the Cape Cod Baseball League.

== Professional career ==
Kazmar was drafted by the Oakland Athletics in the 37th round of the 2003 Major League Baseball draft, but did not sign.

=== San Diego Padres ===
The San Diego Padres drafted Kazmar out of the College of Southern Nevada in the fifth round of the 2004 Major League Baseball draft and he signed. Kazmar started 2008 with the Double-A San Antonio Missions and was batting .264 in 111 games when he was called up to the majors on August 12, 2008. He recorded his first Major League hit on August 13, 2008, on the first pitch of his first ever plate appearance from the Milwaukee Brewers' pitcher CC Sabathia. On November 6, 2010, he elected free agency.

=== Seattle Mariners ===
On November 17, 2010, Kazmar signed a minor league contract with the Seattle Mariners. He spent the year with the Triple–A Tacoma Rainiers and elected free agency on November 2, 2011.

=== New York Mets ===
On January 10, 2012, Kazmar signed with the New York Mets on a minor league contract. He elected free agency on November 2, after spending the year with the Binghamton Mets and Buffalo Bisons.

=== Atlanta Braves ===
On January 19, 2013, Kazmar signed a minor league contract with the Atlanta Braves organization. He was assigned to the Triple–A Gwinnett Braves to begin the year, where he hit .228 with 29 RBI in 95 games. He returned to Gwinnett for the 2014 season, playing in 67 games and batting .297/.348/.435 with 4 home runs and 34 RBI. He elected for free agency after the 2014 season. On November 12, 2014, Kazmar re–signed with the Braves organization. Kazmar played in 106 games for the affiliate in 2015, logging a .280/.314/.396 batting line with 3 home runs and 38 RBI. He elected for free agency following the season on November 7, 2015.

On December 13, 2015, Kazmar re-signed with Atlanta on a new minor-league contract. In 2016, he played in 93 games for Triple-A Gwinnett, hitting .263/.298/.364 with 5 home runs and 37 RBI. He elected free agency following the season on November 7, 2016. On November 19, he signed a new minor-league contract to remain with the Braves organization. Kazmar played in 99 games for Gwinnett in 2017, hitting .284/.310/.416 with 11 home runs and 45 RBI. On November 6, 2017, Kazmar elected free agency. He was re–signed to a minor league contract on November 16.

Kazmar was invited to spring training for the 2019 season but did not make the team and returned to Gwinnett. In 108 games, he slashed .270/.333/.430 with 12 home runs and 61 RBI. He was again invited to spring training for the 2020 season. Kazmar did not play in a game in 2020 due to the cancellation of the minor league season because of the COVID-19 pandemic. He became a free agent following the year on November 2, 2020. On December 7, Kazmar again re-signed with the Braves on a minor-league contract. He received an invitation to attend Major League spring training on February 15, 2021.

On April 17, 2021, Kazmar was selected to the 40-man roster and promoted to the major leagues for the first time since 2008. That same day he made his first MLB appearance in over 12 years, pinch hitting for Huascar Ynoa; hitting against Trevor Williams, he grounded into a double play in his only at-bat. At a time span of 12 years and 206 days, this is the ninth longest gap for a player between major league appearances in MLB history. On April 24, he was optioned to the Braves alternate site after two games. After receiving only 2 plate appearances in 3 games, Kazmar was outrighted off of the 40-man roster on May 10. The Braves would go on to win the World Series, earning Kazmar his first career World Series victory.

On October 14, Kazmar elected free agency. On November 12, Kazmar announced his retirement from professional baseball.

== Coaching career ==
On February 23, 2023, Kazmar was hired to serve as the hitting coach for the Rocket City Trash Pandas, the Double-A affiliate of the Los Angeles Angels.
