= Charlie Morton (pitcher) =

American baseball player (born 1983)

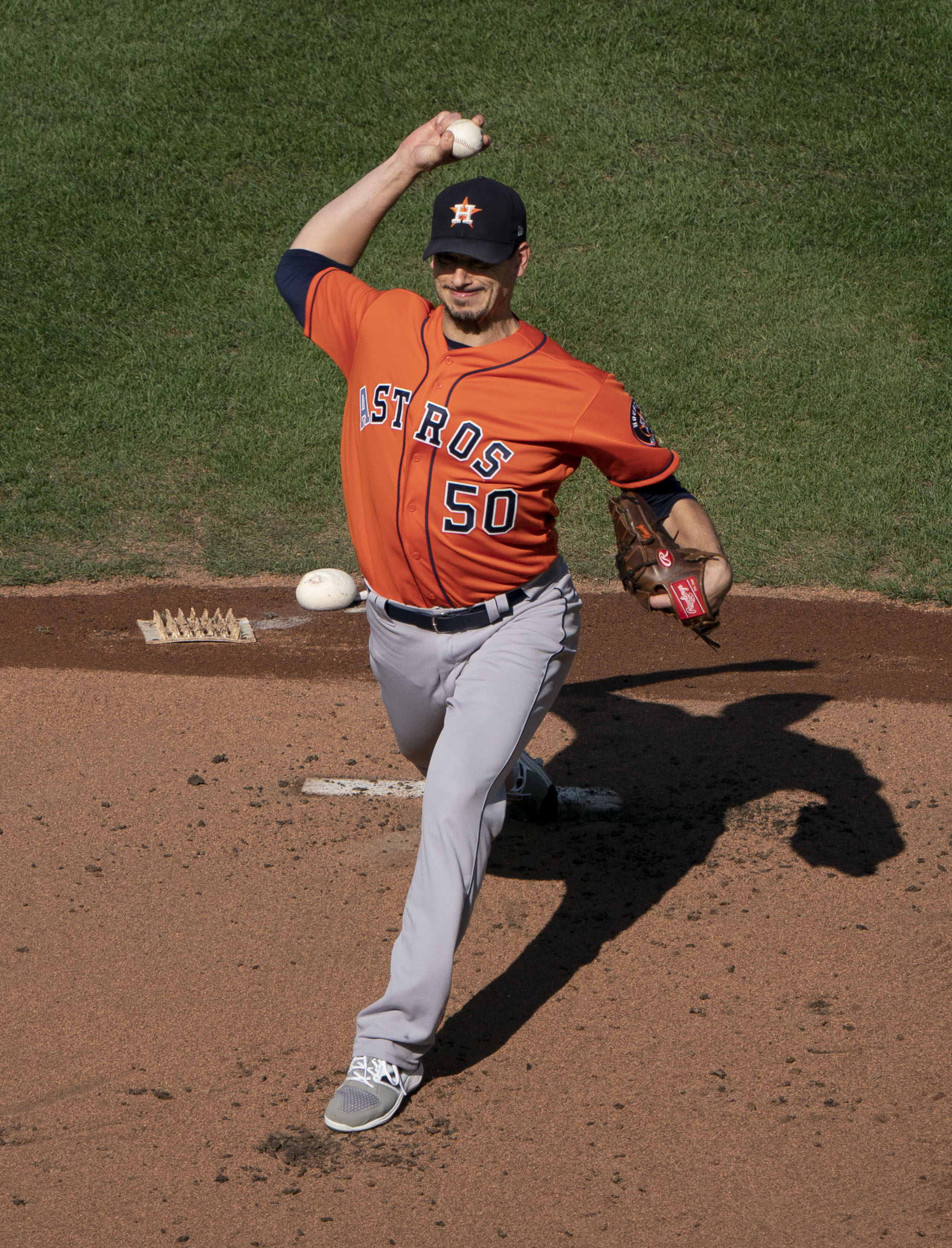
- Morton with the Houston Astros in 2018
- Pitcher
- Born: November 12, 1983 (age 43); Flemington, New Jersey, U.S.
- Batted: Right Threw: Right

MLB debut
- June 14, 2008, for the Atlanta Braves

Last MLB appearance
- September 28, 2025, for the Atlanta Braves

MLB statistics
- Win–loss record: 147–134
- Earned run average: 4.13
- Strikeouts: 2,196
- Stats at Baseball Reference

Teams
- Atlanta Braves (2008); Pittsburgh Pirates (2009–2015); Philadelphia Phillies (2016); Houston Astros (2017–2018); Tampa Bay Rays (2019–2020); Atlanta Braves (2021–2024); Baltimore Orioles (2025); Detroit Tigers (2025); Atlanta Braves (2025)

Career highlights and awards
- 2× All-Star (2018, 2019); 2× World Series champion (2017, 2021)

Charles Alfred Morton IV (born November 12, 1983) is an American former professional baseball pitcher. He played in Major League Baseball (MLB) for the Atlanta Braves, Pittsburgh Pirates, Philadelphia Phillies, Houston Astros, Tampa Bay Rays, Baltimore Orioles, and Detroit Tigers.

The Braves selected Morton in the third round of the 2002 MLB draft and he made his MLB debut with them in 2008. Morton was a World Series champion in 2017 and 2021 and an All-Star in 2018 and 2019. Morton has the most career batters hit by pitch of active pitchers with 200 as of September 19th, 2025.

== Early life ==
Morton was born in Flemington, New Jersey, to Dr. Jeanne and Chip Morton, an accountant and former Penn State basketball player. His grandfather played in the Philadelphia Athletics farm system. He was raised in Trumbull, Connecticut, playing little league baseball with future major leaguers pitcher Craig Breslow and infielder Jamie D'Antona. Morton grew up attending ballgames at Yankee Stadium and idolizing Derek Jeter and Roger Clemens. He attended Joel Barlow High School in Redding, Connecticut, graduating in 2002.

== Professional career ==
=== Draft and minor leagues (2002–2008) ===
The Atlanta Braves selected Morton in the third round with the 95th overall selection of the 2002 Major League Baseball draft. He started his professional career in 2002 with the GCL Braves, and was 1–7. In 2003, he played for the Danville Braves, and was 2–5. He spent the 2004 and 2005 seasons with the Rome Braves. In 2006, he pitched for the Myrtle Beach Pelicans and was 6–7. In 2007, he pitched for the Mississippi Braves, and was 4–6.

=== Atlanta Braves (2008) ===
The Braves added Morton to their 40-man roster on November 20, 2007. Morton made his major league debut on June 14, 2008, against the Los Angeles Angels of Anaheim, allowing three runs in six innings and earning his first major league win. In 2008 he was 4–8 with a 6.15 ERA.

=== Pittsburgh Pirates (2009–2015) ===
On June 3, 2009, the Braves traded Morton with Gorkys Hernández and Jeff Locke to the Pittsburgh Pirates in exchange for Nate McLouth. He made his first start with the Pirates on June 10 pitching an inning against the Atlanta Braves, while Jeff Karstens got the win. On June 28, he received his first decision, a loss to the Kansas City Royals. On July 3, 2009, he won his first game, pitching 6 innings of 1 hit baseball against the Florida Marlins. On September 30, 2009, he pitched a complete game 4-hitter with 8 strikeouts against the Chicago Cubs. His 2009 record in 18 starts was 5 wins and 9 losses, a 4.55 ERA, 97 innings pitched, and 62 strikeouts, 40 walks, 7 home runs, 5 hit batsmen, .276 average against, and a 1.46 WHIP.

Morton began 2010 spring training as a member of the Pirates' starting rotation. He struggled, losing all five starts in April and finishing the month with a 12.57 earned run average (ERA). However, Morton delivered a promising performance on April 30, 2010, against the Los Angeles Dodgers, striking out 8 in six innings of work while allowing six runs (only three earned). In that game, he was dealt a loss as the Pirates only provided him with two runs of support. He earned his first win of the season on May 5 against the Chicago Cubs, striking out three in a 4–2 decision. However, he lost each of his next four starts, dropping his record on the season to 1–9 with a 9.35 ERA. A day after suffering his 9th loss against the Cincinnati Reds, the Pirates placed him on the 15-day disabled list with shoulder fatigue. After recovering, he was assigned to the Pirates Triple-A affiliate Indianapolis Indians.

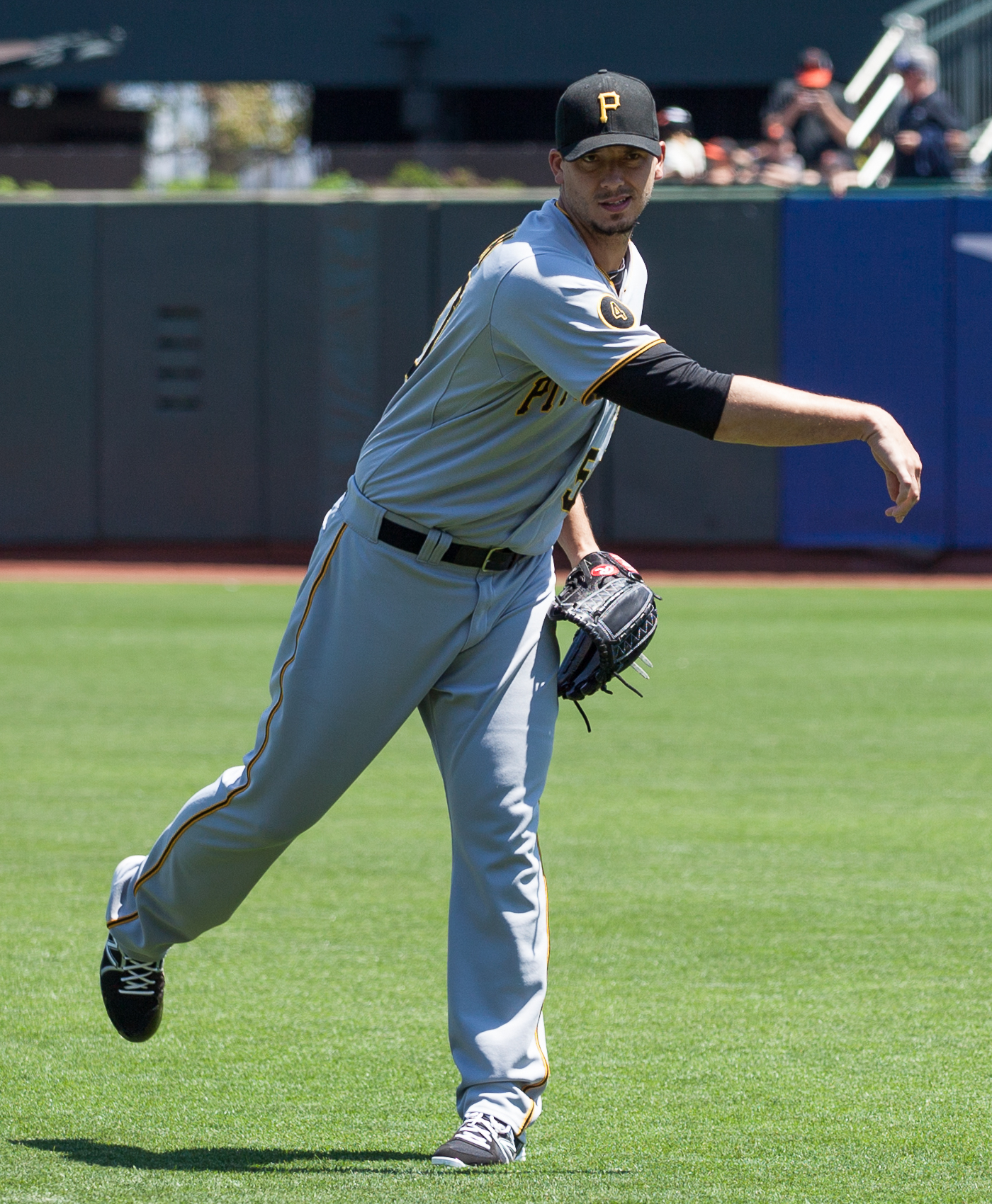
Morton with the Pirates in 2014

Speaking before his first start with the Indians, Morton said, "I was pressing. I wasn't being myself on the mound those last couple of times I went out there in Pittsburgh. There was so much going on in my mind. At the end of last year, I finished strong, I got a glimpse of what I could do, truly, in the big leagues, going out there and going deep into games, being competitive, and being someone who was pretty good. I wanted to be out there for myself and because I care about this team and organization. At the same time, though, after that last one, that last start, because I care about these guys is why, exactly, I knew I couldn't go back out there again."

Morton was recalled when starter Ross Ohlendorf was placed on the 15-day disabled list due to a shoulder injury. On his final start of the 2010 season, Morton compiled his finest pitching performance of the year, striking out a career-high nine batters in a 2–0 loss to the Florida Marlins on October 2. He finished the season with a 2–12 record and a 7.57 ERA, but in his final six starts of the season after being recalled in late August, he sported a 4.26 ERA.

2011 was Morton's best season yet, where he held a 10–10 record in 29 starts with a 3.83 ERA, earning the club's Breakout Player of the Year. On April 15, Morton threw a complete game against the Cincinnati Reds. On May 18, again at Great American Ball Park, Morton threw a complete game shutout, striking out 5 and giving up 5 hits. Following the season, Morton underwent successful hip surgery to repair a torn labrum in October 2011 with a full recovery expected in 4–6 months. He was optimistic about returning before Opening Day. However, he began the 2012 season on the disabled list, making his season debut on April 14. His season ended when he underwent Tommy John surgery on June 14, 2012.

On June 13, 2013, Morton was activated off the DL. He picked up his first win of the season on June 18 in a shutout against the Cincinnati Reds. He pitched 5 1/3 innings, giving up only 3 hits and no runs, while striking out 2. On July 22 and 27, he won back-to-back games for the first time since May 7 and 18, 2011. On December 11, 2013, Morton signed a three-year contract to remain with the Pirates, with a club option for the 2017 season. Morton was placed on the DL with right hip inflammation on August 17, 2014. At the time, he was 5–12 with a 3.84 ERA. During September, Morton needed hip surgery, effectively ending his 2014 season. In 26 starts in 2014, Morton hit 19 batsmen with pitches, which led the Majors along with a 6–12 record and a 3.72 ERA.

During the 2015 spring training, Morton struggled thoroughly and began to experience inflammation in his recently surgically repaired hip. On April 5, 2015, the Pirates placed Morton on the 15-day disabled list.

=== Philadelphia Phillies (2016) ===
On December 12, 2015, the Pirates traded Morton to the Philadelphia Phillies in exchange for David Whitehead. His season came to an abrupt end on April 23, 2016, when Morton suffered a hamstring injury running to first base in a game against the Milwaukee Brewers and was placed on the disabled list the next day. On April 27, the Phillies announced Morton would miss the rest of the 2016 season with a torn hamstring.

=== Houston Astros (2017–2018) ===
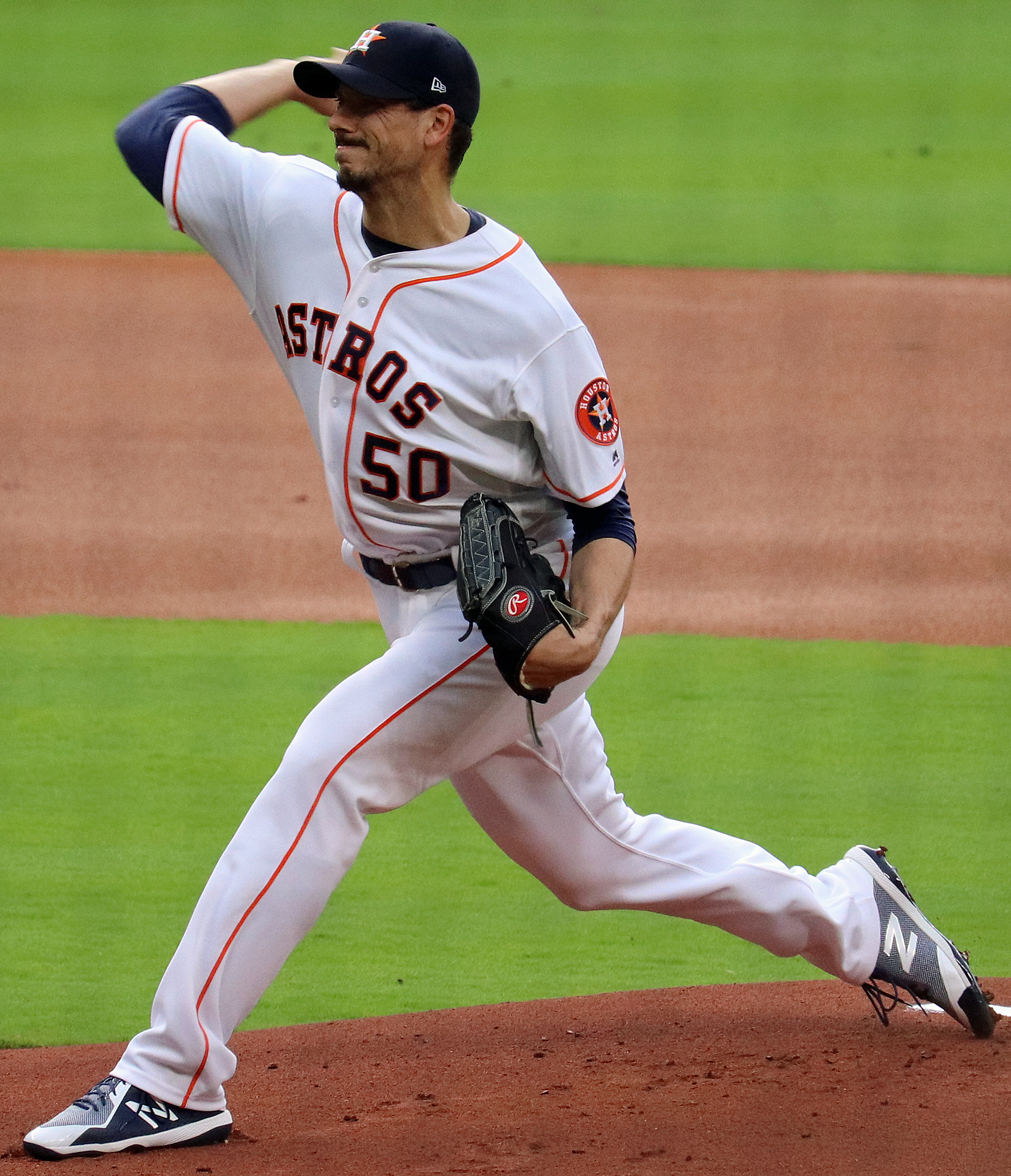
Morton pitching with the Astros in 2018

On November 16, 2016, Morton signed a two-year, $14 million contract with the Houston Astros. During the 2017 regular season, Morton made 25 starts, compiling a 14–7 record with a 3.62 ERA. He pitched 146 2/3 innings and recorded 163 strikeouts. Morton started Game 3 of the American League Championship Series (ALCS) at Yankee Stadium. He lost the game, giving up 7 runs in 3 2/3 innings. On October 21, he won Game 7 of the ALCS at Minute Maid Park, pitching five shutout innings with five strikeouts, sending the Astros to the World Series. Morton started Game 4 of the World Series and pitched well over 6 1/3 innings giving up one earned run on 3 hits and 7 strikeouts in an eventual Astros loss. Morton pitched the final four innings in Game 7 of the World Series. He was credited as the winning pitcher helping the Astros win their first World Series title. Three years later, it was revealed in the Houston Astros sign stealing scandal that the team had broken MLB rules during the 2017 season. Morton admitted he knew about the team's cheating and expressed regret that he did not do anything to stop it.

In 2018, Morton continued his successful stint with the Astros. On May 12, he set a personal record of 14 strikeouts over seven innings in a 6–1 victory against the Texas Rangers. Entering the All-Star break third in the American League with 11 wins, 11.7 strikeouts per nine innings, and ninth in ERA (2.96), Morton was added to the AL roster for the 2018 MLB All-Star Game. Morton avoided serious injury in 2018, with only a short trip to the 10-day DL for shoulder discomfort. He pitched 167 innings, second only to his 2011 high of 171 2/3. Morton finished the regular season with a 3.13 ERA, a 15–3 win–loss record, and 201 strikeouts, all constituting career highs. Morton was recognized by the BBWAA's Houston chapter as winner of the Darryl Kile Good Guy Award.

=== Tampa Bay Rays (2019–2020) ===
On December 21, 2018, the Tampa Bay Rays signed Morton to a two-year, $30 million contract. He made his debut as a Ray against the Astros on March 29, 2019, pitching five innings and earning the win. On June 30, he was awarded his second consecutive All-Star appearance. In 2019, he led all major league pitchers in home runs/9 innings pitched, at 0.694. He set career highs in wins (16), ERA (3.05), innings (194 2/3) and strikeouts (240). He finished in third place for the Cy Young Award. Morton started the American League Wild Card Game against the Oakland Athletics, receiving a win in five innings of work. This was Morton's third career win in winner-take-all playoff games, the most in MLB playoff history.

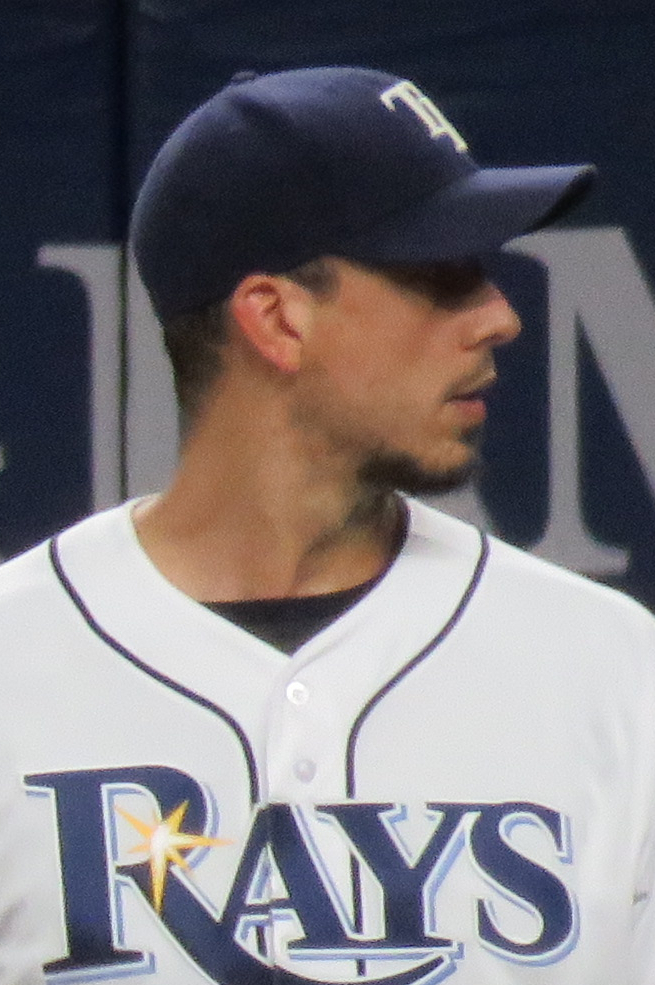
Morton with the Rays in 2019

On August 10, 2020, Morton was placed on the injured list with inflammation in his right shoulder. Morton finished the 2020 year with an ERA of 4.74 over 38 innings. Morton pitched in game 7 of the American League Championship Series against his former team the Houston Astros. He recorded his fourth win in a winner-take-all playoff game, extending his record.

On October 30, 2020, the Rays declined their $15 million team option on his contract for the 2021 season, and he was declared a free agent. At the time the Rays made their decision, it was reported that they were looking for a "creative" way to re-sign Morton as a free agent for the following year.

=== Atlanta Braves (2021–2024) ===
On November 24, 2020, the Atlanta Braves signed Morton to a one-year, $15 million contract. On September 6, 2021, Morton and the Braves agreed to a one-year extension worth $20 million. In the 2021 regular season, he was 14–6 with a 3.34 ERA and 216 strikeouts in 33 starts.

On October 26, 2021, during Game 1 of the World Series versus the Houston Astros, Morton left the game after pitching only 2 1/3 innings with what was revealed to be a right fibula fracture. The injury occurred in the previous inning when Astros batter Yuli Gurriel hit a ball directly into Morton's leg. Initially believing he was unharmed, Morton continued to pitch, completing 16 more pitches—including a strikeout of former MVP Jose Altuve—before removing himself from the game. Morton did not play for the remainder of the series. The Braves later won the World Series, giving the Braves their first title since 1995 and Morton his second World Series ring. On September 30, 2022, Morton and the Braves agreed to a one-year contract extension for the 2023 season worth $20 million. Morton recorded at least 200 strikeouts in consecutive seasons with the team, and became the third Atlanta Braves pitcher to have struck out 200 or more batters in multiple seasons.

In 2022, he was 9–6 with a 4.34 ERA, as in 31 starts he pitched 172 innings, and threw curveballs 38% of the time, more than any other pitcher in major league baseball. The active career leader in hit batsmen with 156, he hit 18 batters, second in the NL. During the 2023 season, Morton pitched to a 3.64 ERA and a 14–12 record. The Braves picked up the option year on his contract, worth $20 million. On June 28, 2024, Morton became the 22nd pitcher in MLB history to record a win against all 30 teams, following a scoreless outing against the Pittsburgh Pirates. On August 13, 2024, Morton became the 89th pitcher in MLB history to reach the 2,000 strikeout mark when he struck out Mike Yastrzemski in the bottom of the sixth inning against the San Francisco Giants. In 2024, Morton pitched to a 4.01 ERA and a 8-10 record with 167 strikeouts.

=== Baltimore Orioles (2025) ===
On January 3, 2025, Morton signed a one-year, $15 million contract with the Baltimore Orioles. He struggled to an 0-6 record and 10.36 ERA with 20 strikeouts over his first six starts. On April 30, manager Brandon Hyde announced that Morton would begin pitching primarily out of the bullpen. He made 23 total appearances (17 starts) for Baltimore, compiling a 7-8 record and 5.42 ERA with 101 strikeouts across 101 1/3 innings pitched.

=== Detroit Tigers (2025) ===
On July 31, 2025, the Orioles traded Morton to the Detroit Tigers in exchange for Micah Ashman. On September 19, Morton became the first pitcher to hit 200 batters since 1927 when he hit Matt Olson on the back foot in the first inning. Morton became the fifth pitcher in Major League history to reach the mark, but the first to pitch entirely in the Live Ball Era. In nine starts for Detroit, he struggled to a 2-3 record and 7.09 ERA with 47 strikeouts across 39 1/3 innings pitched. Morton was designated for assignment by the Tigers on September 21.

=== Atlanta Braves (2025) ===
On September 22, 2025, Morton signed a major league contract with the Atlanta Braves. Morton started his last MLB game six days later, recording four outs against the Pittsburgh Pirates on the final day of the regular season. He only pitched 1 1/3 innings as he allowed only two hits and walking one batter while striking out only one batter in his final start of the season and possibly his final MLB start as well. With three different organizations throughout 2025, Morton pitched to a 5.83 ERA and a 9-11 record with 149 strikeouts.

== Pitching style ==
Morton's repertoire consisted in 2013 of a four-seam fastball, a sinker, a curveball, and a split-finger fastball with his speed maxing out in the low 90s. Morton picked up the splitter in 2011 having previously thrown a changeup. He also has previously thrown a slider and a cutter. Morton's sinker was his most common pitch, especially against right-handed hitters. His curveball was his most common pitch in a two-strike count.

Due to changes in his delivery and the emphasis he has placed on the sinker, Morton drew comparisons to Roy Halladay. Pirates special assistant Jim Benedict had previously encouraged Morton to emulate Halladay's delivery during spring training. Morton featured his new sinker almost exclusively in his first starts of the 2011 season, and it resulted in an increased groundball rate but also more bases on balls. Pirates' fans christened him with the nickname "Ground Chuck."

In the 2015 offseason, a frustrated Morton began experimenting with throwing harder, alongside adjustments to his technique and workouts. In his injury-abbreviated starts with the Phillies, he showcased his newfound velocity. Along with high spin rates, this attracted the attention of Houston's front office which signed him and encouraged Morton to continue throwing hard four-seam fastballs, as Morton felt his sinker was becoming ineffective. While playing for the Astros, Morton transformed into a strikeout pitcher finding new effectiveness against left-handed hitters. With Houston his primary pitches were a four-seam fastball reaching 98-99 MPH and a curveball with considerable vertical and horizontal movement, which Morton considers his best pitch. In 2018, his improvements on his curveball was attributed to his low three-quarters position, but slightly above sidearm at release.

== Personal life ==
Morton and his wife, Cindy, have four children. They reside in Bradenton, Florida.

== See also ==
- List of people from Redding, Connecticut
- List of World Series starting pitchers
