= Jay Flaa =

American baseball player (born 1992)

- Pitcher
- Born: June 10, 1992 (age 33); Bismarck, North Dakota, U.S.
- Batted: Right Threw: Right

MLB debut
- April 27, 2021, for the Baltimore Orioles

Last MLB appearance
- May 29, 2021, for the Atlanta Braves

MLB statistics
- Win–loss record: 0–0
- Earned run average: 13.50
- Strikeouts: 3
- Stats at Baseball Reference

Teams
- Baltimore Orioles (2021); Atlanta Braves (2021)

Jay Thomas Flaa (/ˈflɔː/ FLAW; born June 10, 1992) is an American former professional baseball pitcher. He played in Major League Baseball (MLB) for the Baltimore Orioles and Atlanta Braves. He was drafted by the Orioles in the 6th round of the 2015 Major League Baseball draft.

== Early life ==
Flaa was born in Bismarck, North Dakota, in 1992 and attended Mandan High School. After graduating in 2010, he first played college baseball at the University of Mary, an NCAA Division II school in Bismarck, North Dakota. After completing his Freshman season in 2011, Flaa transferred to North Dakota State University, an NCAA Division I school in Fargo, North Dakota.

== Career ==
=== Baltimore Orioles ===
Flaa was selected by the Baltimore Orioles in the 6th round (193rd overall) of the 2015 Major League Baseball draft out of North Dakota State University. He made his professional debut with the Gulf Coast League Orioles, quickly moving to the Low–A Aberdeen IronBirds, where he spent the rest of the season.

In 2016, Flaa spent the year in Single–A with the Delmarva Shorebirds, registering a 5–1 record and 3.50 ERA with 50 strikeouts in 28 games. The next year, he played with the High-A Frederick Keys, pitching to a 4–3 record and 3.29 ERA in 54 2/3 innings of work. Flaa played the 2018 season in Double–A with the Bowie Baysox, recording a 2.77 ERA with 67 strikeouts in 65 innings of work. In 2019, Flaa reached Triple–A for the first time with the Norfolk Tides, but struggled to a 5.24 ERA in 29 games for the club. He had a much better performance in Bowie, pitching to a 2.81 ERA with 28 strikeouts in 11 games.

Flaa did not play in a game in 2020 due to the cancellation of the Minor League Baseball season because of the COVID-19 pandemic. On April 26, 2021, Flaa was selected to the 40-man roster and promoted to the major leagues for the first time. He was assigned the number 77, last worn for the Orioles by catcher Eli Whiteside in 2005. On April 27, Flaa made his MLB debut against the New York Yankees. In the game, he also notched his first major league strikeout, punching out Yankees outfielder Aaron Judge. On May 8, Flaa was designated for assignment following the waiver claim of Brandon Waddell.

=== Atlanta Braves ===
On May 11, 2021, Flaa was claimed off waivers by the Atlanta Braves. Flaa allowed 4 runs in 1 1/3 innings of work in his sole appearance with Atlanta. On July 13, Flaa was outrighted off of the 40-man roster and assigned to the Triple-A Gwinnett Stripers.
