= Ozzie Albies =

Curaçaoan baseball player (born 1997)

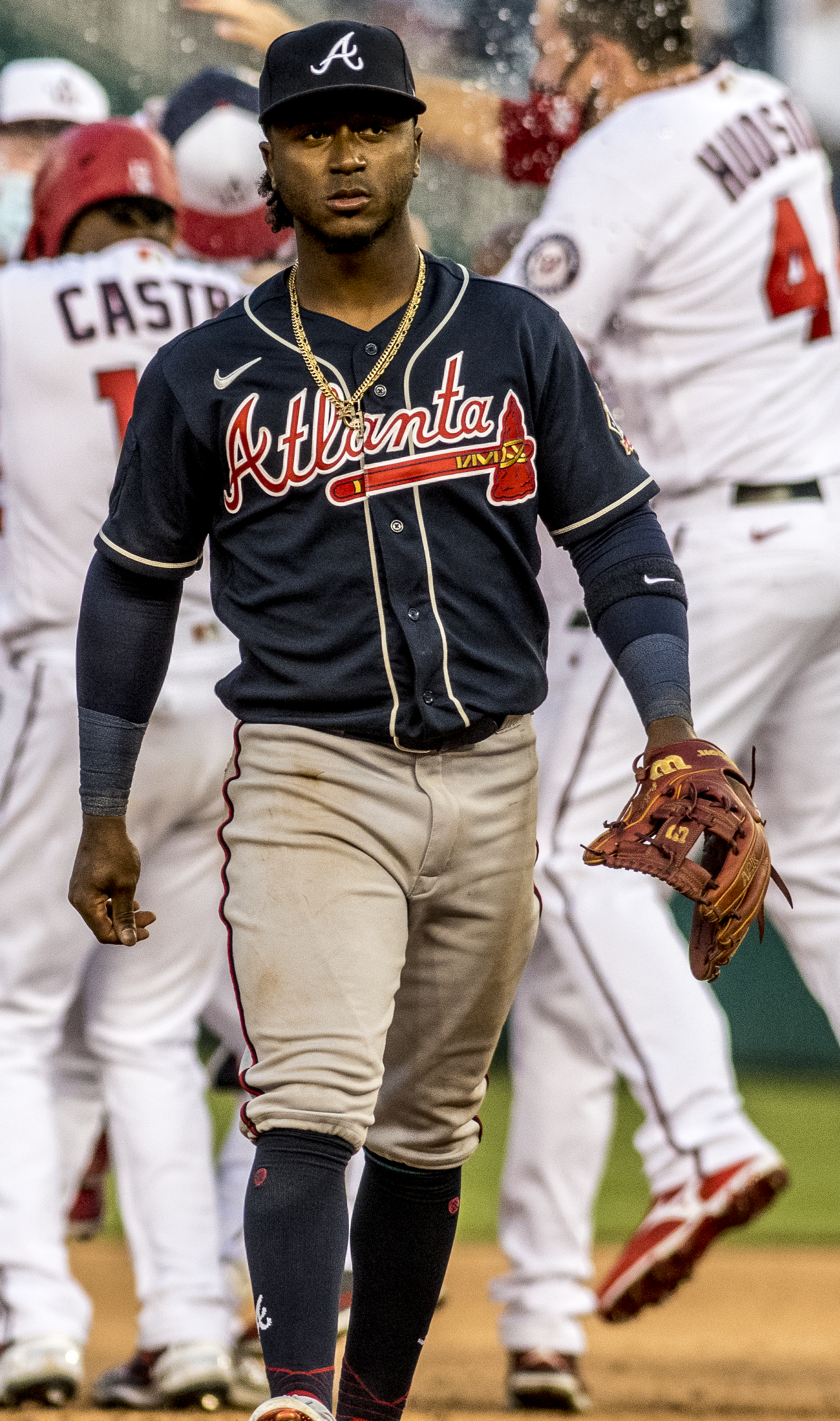
- Albies with the Atlanta Braves in 2021

Atlanta Braves – No. 1
- Second baseman
- Born: January 7, 1997 (age 29); Willemstad, Curaçao
- Bats: Switch Throws: Right

MLB debut
- August 1, 2017, for the Atlanta Braves

MLB statistics (through 2026 season)
- Batting average: .262
- Hits: 1,232
- Home runs: 179
- Runs batted in: 655
- Stats at Baseball Reference

Teams
- Atlanta Braves (2017–present)

Career highlights and awards
- 4× All-Star (2018, 2021, 2023, 2026); World Series champion (2021); 2× Silver Slugger Award (2019, 2021)

Ozhaino Jurdy Jiandro "Ozzie" Albies (born January 7, 1997) is a Curaçaoan professional baseball second baseman for the Atlanta Braves of Major League Baseball (MLB). Albies signed with the Braves organization in 2013 and made his MLB debut with the team in 2017. During his first full season, Albies was named to the 2018 MLB All-Star Game. Albies was later named to the 2021, 2023 and 2026 All-Star games. He won the National League Silver Slugger Award in 2019 and 2021. In 2021, he also won the Heart & Hustle Award, and his team won the World Series.

== Career ==
=== Minor leagues ===
Albies started playing baseball at the age of six and began switch-hitting in 2013. Discovered by the Curaçao-based scout Dargello Lodowica, Albies was signed by the Atlanta Braves for $350,000 as an international free agent on July 2, 2013. Influencing his decision to sign was the Braves' connection to Andruw Jones and Andrelton Simmons, both, like Albies, natives of Curaçao. He made his professional debut in 2014 with the Gulf Coast Braves and joined the Danville Braves in July. In 57 games, Albies hit .364/.446/.444 with a home run. After the season, he was ranked among the top 100 prospects in baseball by Keith Law and fifth-best in Braves farm system by Baseball America.

Albies began the 2015 season with the Rome Braves. In July, he was named to the All Star Futures Game. He was the only Braves prospect to appear in the game that year, as well as the youngest player on the field. Albies went 1-for-2 in the game, which the World Team lost to the U.S. 10–1. He fractured his right thumb during the first week of August and missed the rest of the season. In 98 games, Albies hit .310/.368/.404, stole 29 bases, and committed 17 errors. MLB.com placed him third on the list of top Braves prospects at the end of 2015, and 30th overall throughout the minors.

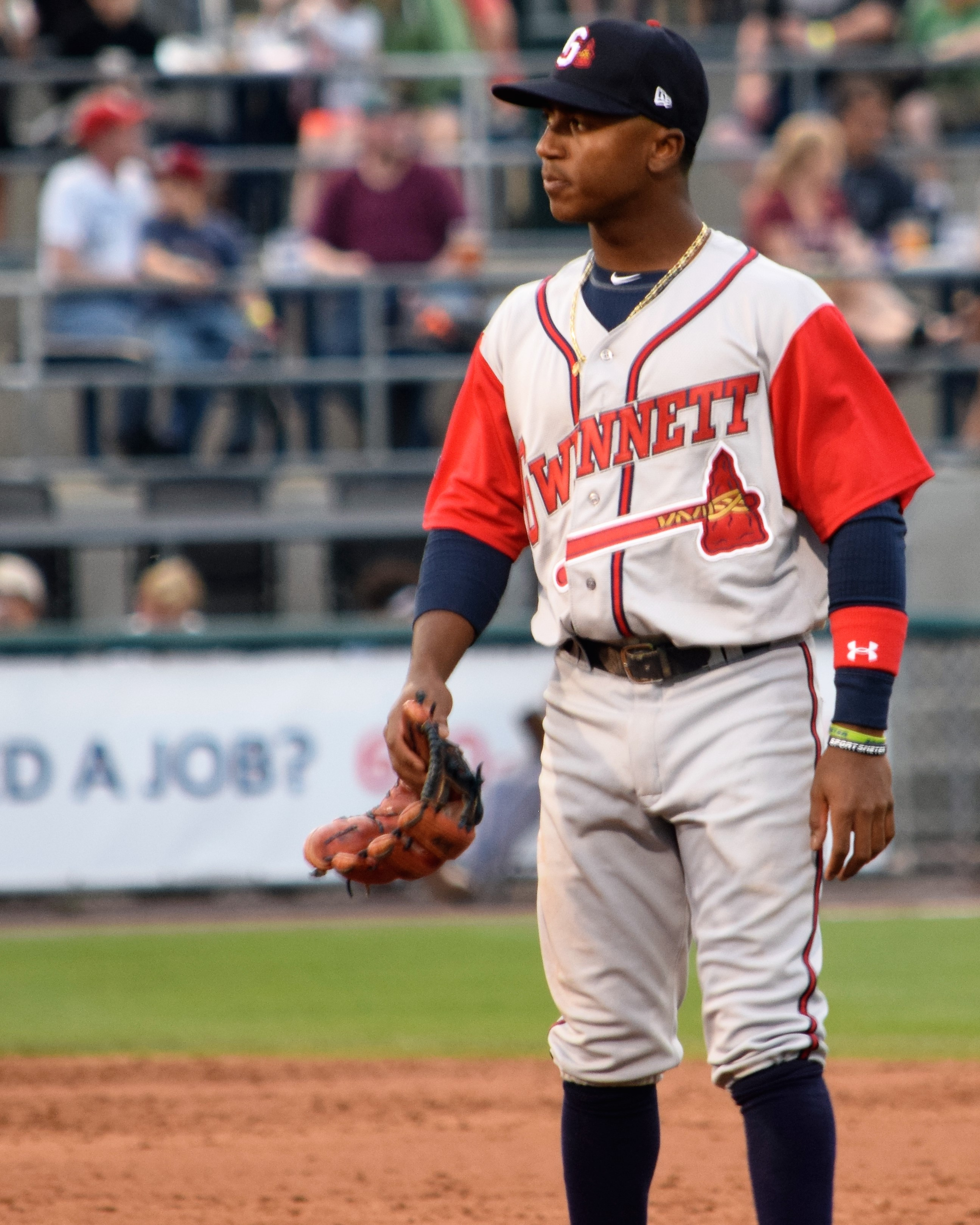
Albies with the Gwinnett Braves in 2016

Albies was invited to spring training in 2016 and opened the season with the Double-A Mississippi Braves. After 22 appearances with Mississippi, he hit .369/.442/.512 and was promoted to the Triple-A Gwinnett Braves on April 30. In two months with Gwinnett, Albies hit .248/.307/.351. On June 30, he returned to Mississippi, playing second base alongside shortstop Dansby Swanson. Upon Swanson's promotion to the major leagues, Albies remained in Mississippi, having hit for a .292 batting average and a .778 OPS between Double-A and Triple-A. Mississippi made the Southern League playoffs, but Albies injured his right elbow in the first postseason game and sat out the remainder of the season.

=== Atlanta Braves ===
==== 2017 ====
Albies was again invited to spring training at the start of the 2017 season. Atlanta called him up on August 1, and he made his major league debut against the Los Angeles Dodgers. On August 3 against the Dodgers, Albies hit his first career home run for his first major league hit.

==== 2018 ====
Albies was part of the Braves' Opening Day starting lineup in 2018. On June 12, he hit a grand slam against the New York Mets en route to an 8–2 win. Albies became the youngest player ever to have two grand slams. On June 25, Albies hit his first career walk-off home run against the Cincinnati Reds. On July 8, while owning a .281 batting average with 18 home runs and 50 RBIs, Albies was named an All-Star via the player vote in his first full year in the major leagues. On July 11, against the Toronto Blue Jays, he had his first career multi-home run game.

In 2018, he batted .261/.305/.452 with 24 home runs and 72 RBIs. On defense, he committed 10 errors, fourth-most of all NL second basemen.

==== 2019 ====
On April 11, 2019, Albies signed a seven-year, $35 million extension with the Braves. The deal includes options for the 2026 and 2027 seasons. Both years are worth $7 million, with a $4 million buyout. His extension was considered team-friendly, with Albies potentially forgoing more than $100 million if he went through arbitration and free agency.

In 2019, he batted .295/.352/.500 with 102 runs, 24 home runs, 86 RBIs, and 112 strikeouts. Albies and teammates Ronald Acuña Jr. and Freddie Freeman won the National League Silver Slugger Awards for second base, outfield, and first base, respectively. On defense, Albies had the best fielding percentage of all major league second basemen (.994).

==== 2020 ====
In the 2020 COVID-19 pandemic-shortened season, Albies batted .271/.306/.466 with six home runs and 19 RBIs.

==== 2021 ====
On June 3, 2021, Albies recorded his 500th career hit, an RBI double off of Washington Nationals reliever Sam Clay. Albies was selected as a reserve for the All-Star Game. When Albies hit his 25th home run of the season on September 4, the 2021 Braves became the second team in MLB history to have its starting infielders hit 25 home runs each. On September 22, Albies recorded his 30th home run and 100th RBI of the season, new career milestones in both statistics. He became the first second baseman in franchise history to have hit 30 home runs and 100 RBI in the same season. On September 29, Albies scored his 100th run of the season. On October 1, he stole his career-high 20th base. He was one of five players with 30 home runs and 20 steals for the season.

In 2021, he batted .259/.310/.488 in 629 at bats (2nd in the NL), with 103 runs (4th), 40 doubles (3rd), 7 triples (3rd), 30 home runs, 106 RBIs (3rd), and 128 strikeouts. He swung at a higher percentage of pitches in the strike zone than any other major leaguer, at 83.4%. On defense, he led all second basemen with 389 assists and committed 8 errors, fourth-most among NL second basemen. The Braves finished with an 88–73 record, clinching the NL East, and eventually won the World Series, the franchise's first title since 1995. Albies played second base every inning of the postseason, batting .254 with 3 doubles, 2 RBI, and 3 steals in 16 games. Following the season, Albies won his second Silver Slugger Award as well as the Heart & Hustle Award.

==== 2022 ====
On June 11, 2022, Albies hit a grand slam off of St. Louis Cardinals pitcher Chris Stratton. Two days later, he fractured his left foot in a game against the Nationals. He was placed on the 60-day injured list and underwent a surgical procedure, performed by Robert Anderson. Albies returned to the active roster on September 16. The next day, Albies fractured his right pinky finger while sliding into second base.

==== 2023 ====
Albies was once again selected as a reserve infielder for the National League in the MLB All-Star Game. Albies played in every game up until August 14 and was placed on the 10-day injured list for the first time all season the next day with a hamstring injury. He returned to the 25-man roster on August 28.

==== 2024 ====
Albies was hit by a pitch from Spencer Arrighetti on April 15, 2024, fractured his toe, and subsequently placed on the 10-day injured list. On July 21, Albies fractured his left wrist in a collision with St. Louis Cardinals outfielder Michael Siani and was expected to miss eight weeks of the season. Albies returned to action on September 20, batting exclusively right-handed. He went 1-for-8 with four strikeouts as the San Diego Padres swept Atlanta in the Wild Card Series.

==== 2025 ====
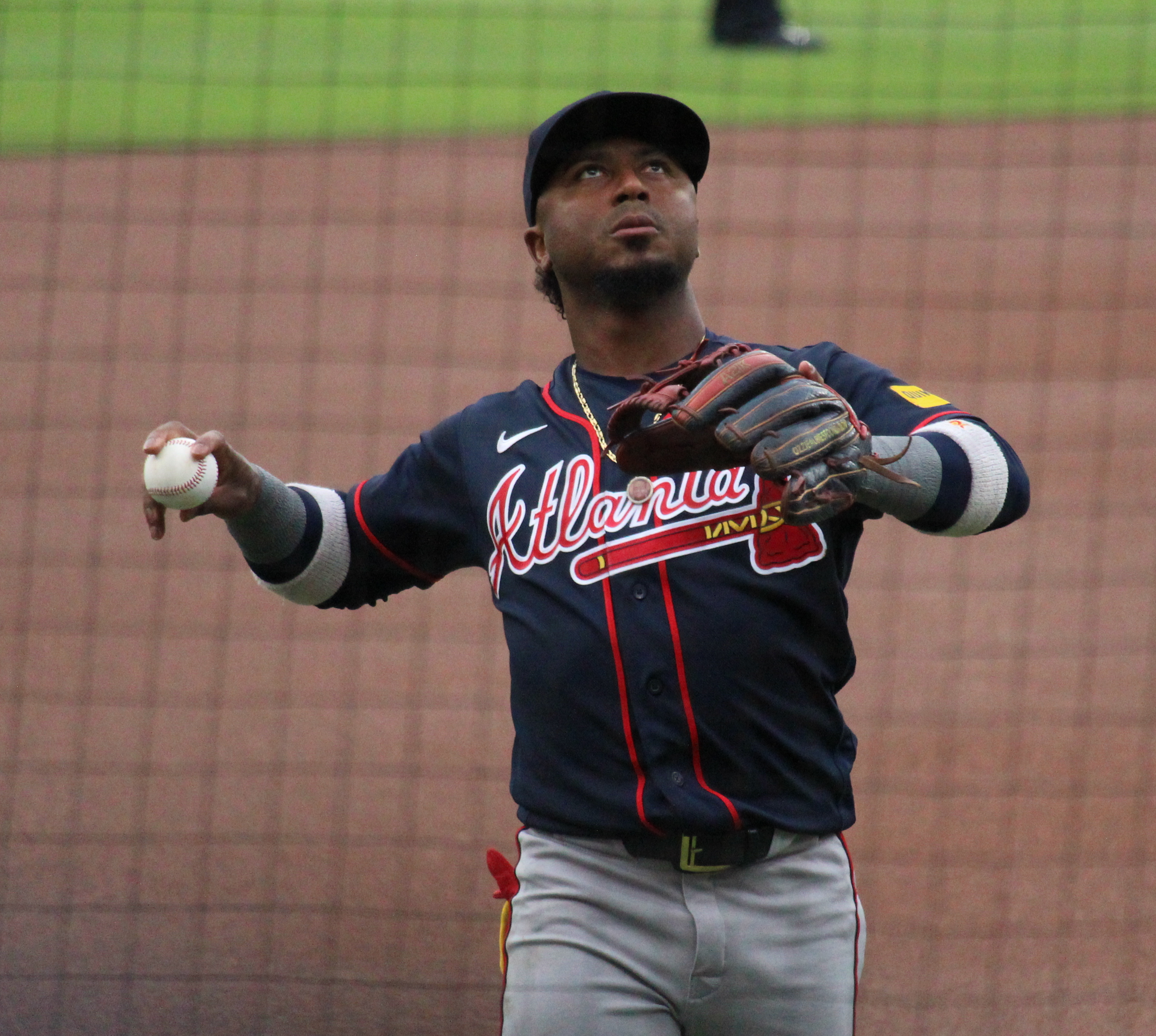
Albies in 2026

Albies recorded his 1,000th career MLB hit on June 9 against the Milwaukee Brewers when he hit a single into left field off Brewers pitcher DL Hall in the top of the 8th inning. On September 22, Albies fractured his left hamate bone when he fouled off a pitch, ending his season. On the season, Albies slashed .240/.306/.365 with 16 home runs, 74 RBI, and 14 stolen bases. Before the hamate injury, Albies had appeared in each of the 157 games the Braves played, and had improved offensively in the second half of the season.

==== 2026 ====
In November 2025, Atlanta exercised the first team option in Albies's contract. He was selected to his fourth All-Star Game in July 2026.

==== 2027 ====
On October 29, 2026, the Braves exercised the team option in Albies's contract.

== International career ==
Albies plays for the Netherlands national baseball team. In the 2026 World Baseball Classic, Albies hit the first-ever walk-off home run in the tournament's history. The walk off was a three-run homer to defeat Nicaragua 4–3 on March 7.

== Personal life ==
Albies was born in Willemstad, Curaçao. His father Osgarry died in 2013 of a heart attack at the age of 40. Albies has a younger brother and sister. Albies speaks four languages: English, Spanish, Dutch, and Papiamento. He is married.

Albies has several large fish tanks in his home in Marietta, Georgia. He watches his aquariums, which house turtles, tropical fish, and a freshwater shark, remotely using an internet-connected camera. He became interested in fish growing up in Curaçao, where his grandfather had a koi pond. He created a separate Instagram account for his fish and posts videos of his fish on YouTube.
