= Dylan Lee =

American baseball pitcher (born 1994)

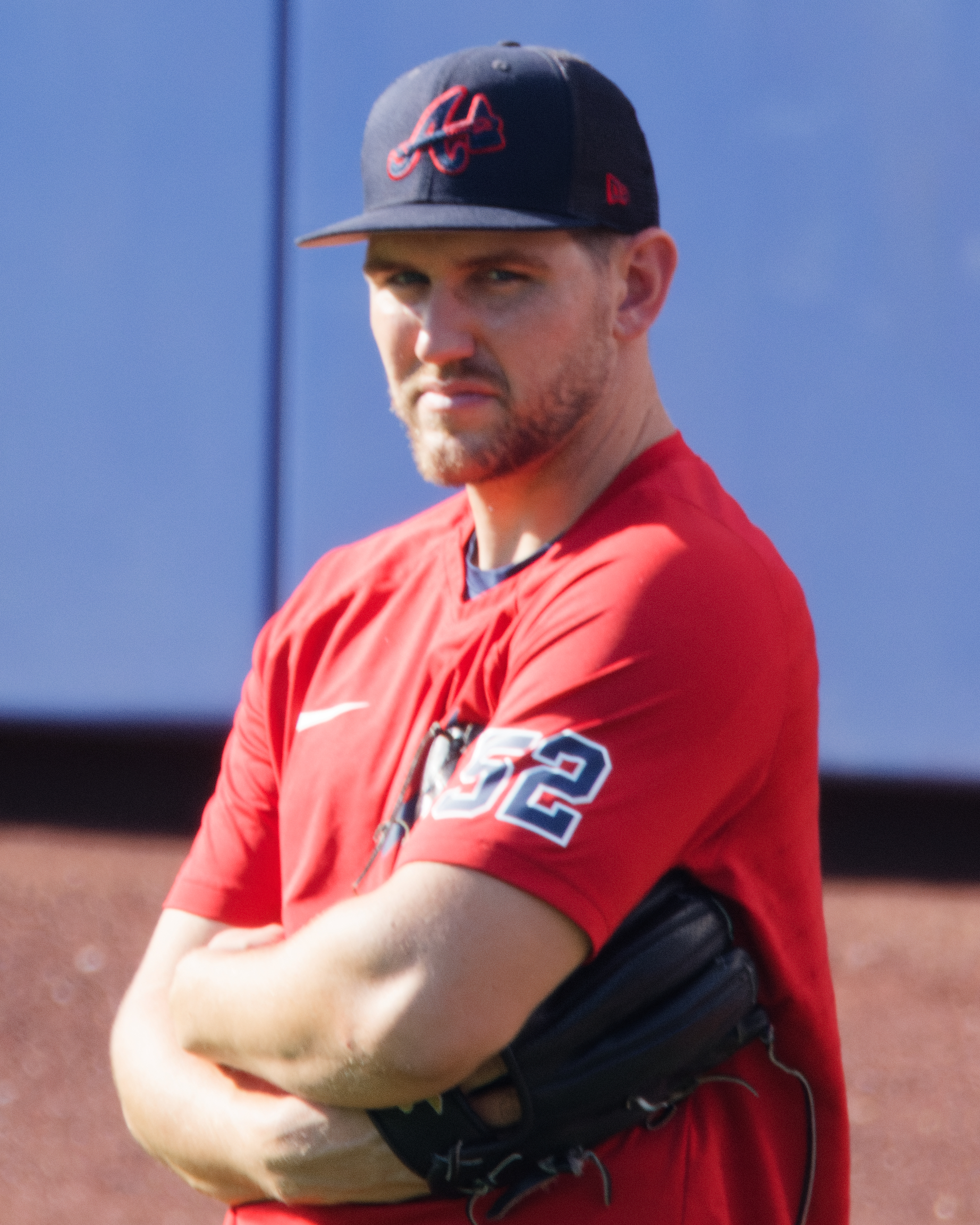
- Lee with the Braves in 2022

Atlanta Braves – No. 52
- Pitcher
- Born: August 1, 1994 (age 32); Dinuba, California, U.S.
- Bats: Left Throws: Left

MLB debut
- October 1, 2021, for the Atlanta Braves

MLB statistics (through 2026 season)
- Win–loss record: 18–8
- Earned run average: 2.89
- Strikeouts: 315
- Stats at Baseball Reference

Teams
- Atlanta Braves (2021–present)

Career highlights and awards
- World Series champion (2021)

Dylan Ryan Lee (born August 1, 1994) is an American professional baseball pitcher for the Atlanta Braves of Major League Baseball (MLB). He played college baseball for Fresno State. He was drafted by the Miami Marlins in the 10th round of the 2016 MLB draft. He made his MLB debut in 2021 and started the fourth game of the 2021 World Series for the Atlanta Braves.

== Amateur career ==
Lee attended Dinuba High School in Dinuba, California. Undrafted out of high school, he attended the College of the Sequoias in Visalia, California for two years. Lee then transferred to Fresno State to play for the Bulldogs. He was drafted by the Miami Marlins in the 10th round of the 2016 MLB draft.

== Professional career ==
=== Miami Marlins ===
Lee split his professional debut season of 2016 between the Gulf Coast Marlins and the Batavia Muckdogs; producing a combined 0–1 record with a 2.48 ERA and 13 strikeouts over 29 innings. He spent the 2017 season with the Greensboro Grasshoppers, going 4–10 with a 4.85 ERA and 73 strikeouts over 98 1/3 innings.

Lee split the 2018 season between the Jupiter Hammerheads, the Jacksonville Jumbo Shrimp, and the New Orleans Baby Cakes, going a combined 8–3 with a 1.60 ERA and 63 strikeouts over 62 innings. He split the 2019 season between Jacksonville and New Orleans, going 1–6 with 13 saves and a 2.91 ERA and 56 strikeouts over 58 2/3 innings. Lee did not play in 2020 due to the cancellation of the Minor League Baseball season because of the COVID-19 pandemic. Lee was released by Miami on March 29, 2021.

=== Atlanta Braves ===
Lee signed a minor league contract with the Atlanta Braves on April 15, 2021. He spent the 2021 minor league season with the Gwinnett Stripers, going 5–1 with one save and a 1.58 ERA and 52 strikeouts over 45 2/3 innings.

On September 22, 2021, Lee was added to the active roster and promoted to the major leagues for the first time. He pitched in relief against the New York Mets on October 1, yielding one hit and recording his first strikeout in his major league debut. On October 8, it was announced Lee was among the Braves relievers to make the postseason roster. Lee did not pitch in any games during the National League Division Series against the Milwaukee Brewers and was initially left off the roster as the Braves advanced to the National League Championship Series against the Los Angeles Dodgers. However, when Huascar Ynoa suffered a shoulder injury, Lee was once again added to the roster. He remained with the team as they advanced to the World Series against the Houston Astros. On October 30, it was announced he would start Game 4 of the World Series against Zack Greinke. He is the first pitcher in MLB history to make a first major league start in a World Series game. Prior to his start in the 2021 World Series, he only had two regular season big league appearances, the fewest career appearances for a starting pitcher in World Series history. However, Lee was pulled after facing only four batters, giving up two walks, one hit and one run while recording only one out.

Lee began the 2022 season with Triple A Gwinnett, then was promoted to the major league roster on April 19, 2022. The Braves optioned Lee back to Gwinnett on April 21. He returned to the major leagues on May 23 and remained there for the remainder of the 2022 season. Lee earned his first career victory on June 13. In 46 games, Lee had a 5-1 record and a 2.13 ERA.

In 2023, Lee posted a 3.10 ERA across 20 appearances out of the bullpen before he was placed on the injured list on May 19 with left shoulder inflammation. He was transferred to the 60-day injured list on June 30. Lee was activated from the injured list on September 1. In 24 total games for Atlanta, he recorded a 4.18 ERA with 24 strikeouts in 23 2/3 innings pitched. On September 12, it was announced Lee would miss the remainder of the season after he was placed on the injured list with left shoulder inflammation. On October 13, 2023, Lee underwent surgery to address shoulder inflammation in his left elbow.
