= Huascar Ynoa =

Dominican baseball player (born 1998)

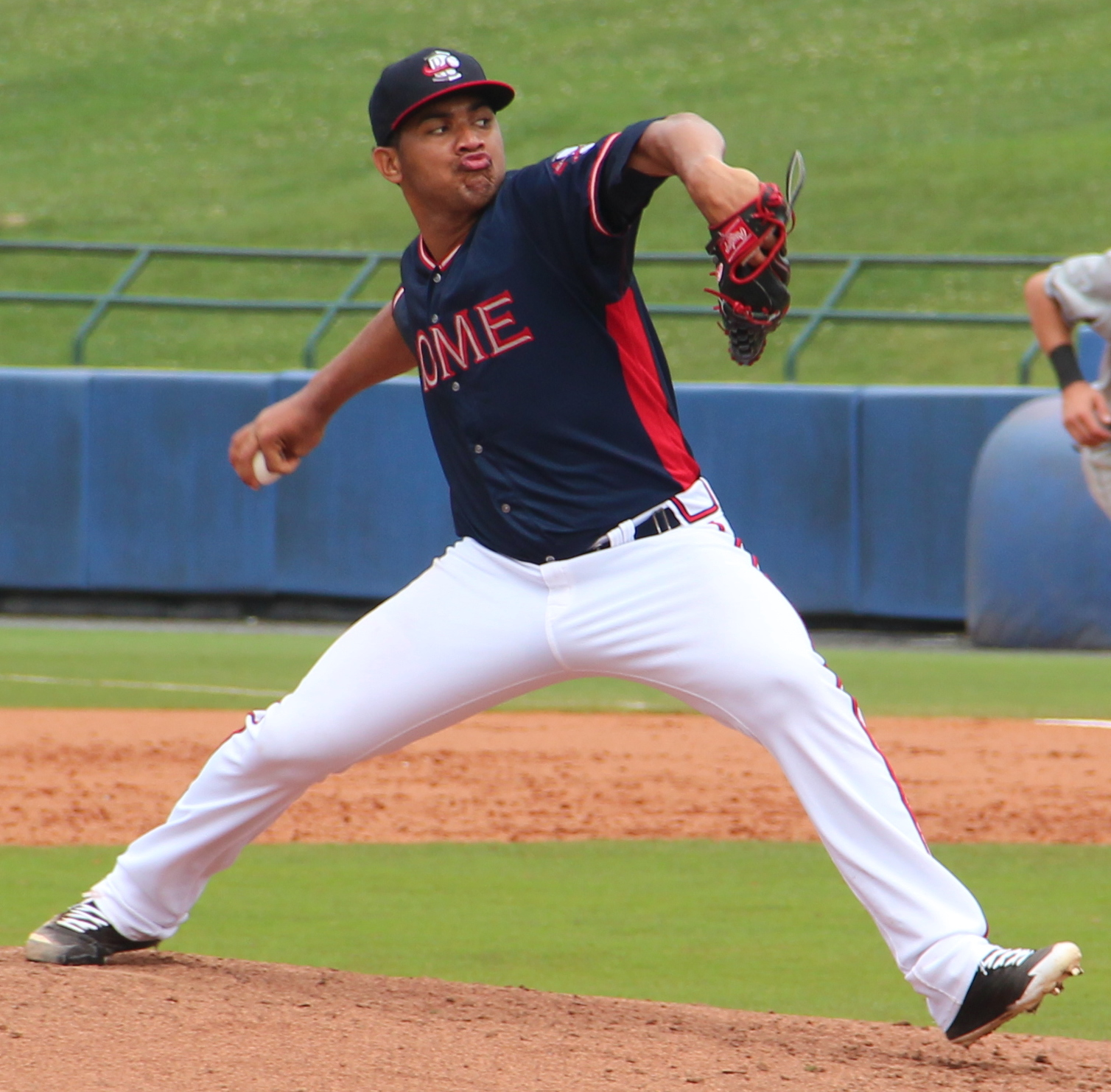
- Ynoa with the Rome Braves in 2018

Free agent
- Pitcher
- Born: May 28, 1998 (age 28); Puerto Plata, Dominican Republic
- Bats: Right Throws: Right

MLB debut
- June 16, 2019, for the Atlanta Braves

MLB statistics (through 2022 season)
- Win–loss record: 4–8
- Earned run average: 5.22
- Strikeouts: 128
- Stats at Baseball Reference

Teams
- Atlanta Braves (2019–2022)

Career highlights and awards
- World Series champion (2021)

Huascar Jose Ynoa Ventura (born May 28, 1998) is a Dominican professional baseball pitcher who is a free agent. He has previously played in Major League Baseball (MLB) for the Atlanta Braves. He made his MLB debut in 2019.

== Career ==
=== Minnesota Twins ===
Ynoa signed with the Minnesota Twins as an international free agent on July 2, 2014. During his time in the Twins organization, he played for the Dominican Summer League Twins in 2015, the rookie–level Gulf Coast League Twins in 2016, and the rookie–level Elizabethton Twins in 2017.

=== Atlanta Braves ===
On July 24, 2017, the Twins traded Ynoa to the Atlanta Braves in exchange for Jaime García and Anthony Recker. He was assigned to the Danville Braves for the rest of the 2017 season. He split the 2018 season between the Rome Braves and the Florida Fire Frogs. The Braves added him to their 40-man roster after the 2018 season, in order to protect him from the Rule 5 draft.

Ynoa opened the 2019 season playing for the Fire Frogs and was promoted to the Mississippi Braves and the Gwinnett Stripers. The Braves promoted him to the major leagues on June 15, 2019. Ynoa made his major league debut the next day, against the Philadelphia Phillies. In the minor leagues in 2019 he was 4–8 and had a 5.09 earned run average (ERA) with 110 strikeouts in 97 1/3 innings. He pitched three innings in the majors in 2019.

In 2020, Ynoa was 0–0 with a 5.82 ERA, in 21 2/3 innings, in nine games, including five starts.

On April 29, 2021, Ynoa hit his first career home run off of Chicago Cubs starter Kyle Hendricks. In his next start on May 4, he hit his first career grand slam off of Washington Nationals reliever Tanner Rainey. On May 17, 2021, Ynoa was put on the 10-day injured list due to a fractured right hand. In his previous start, he allowed 5 runs in 4 1/3 innings against the Milwaukee Brewers and suffered the injury when he punched a bench out of frustration. He was placed on the 60-day injured list on May 31. On August 17, Ynoa was activated off of the injured list.

In 2021, he was 4–6 with a 4.05 ERA. Ynoa pitched out of the Braves ‘ bullpen in the National League Division Series against the Brewers. As the Braves advanced to the National League Championship Series against the Los Angeles Dodgers, Ynoa was scheduled to start Game 4. However, he suffered a shoulder injury as he prepared hours before. The Braves ruled Ynoa out for the game and Jesse Chavez started in his place. Ynoa was also replaced on the roster by Dylan Lee, making him ineligible to play again in the 2021 postseason. The Braves eventually won the 2021 World Series, their first title since 1995.

Ynoa began the 2022 season in the Atlanta Braves' pitching rotation, making two ineffective appearances before a demotion to the Gwinnett Braves in April. On September 8, the organization announced that Ynoa needed Tommy John surgery. He missed the 2023 season to recover from the surgery, and was signed to a one-year contract worth $825,000 for the 2024 season on January 4, 2024.

Ynoa began the 2024 season in Triple-A Gwinnett after not being able to secure the fifth spot in the Braves rotation. He was placed on the injured list with right elbow inflammation on April 23, 2024, and transferred to the 60–day injured list on June 16. On November 22, the Braves non–tendered Ynoa, making him a free agent.

=== Minnesota Twins (second stint) ===
On December 10, 2024, Ynoa signed a minor league contract with the Minnesota Twins. In five appearances for the Triple-A St. Paul Saints, he struggled to an 0–1 record and 10.38 ERA with one strikeout across 4 1/3 innings pitched. Ynoa was released by the Twins organization on April 19, 2025.

=== Leones de Yucatán ===
On May 12, 2025, Ynoa signed with the Leones de Yucatán of the Mexican League. In six starts for Yucatán, he struggled to an 0–4 record and 8.47 ERA with 10 strikeouts over 17 innings of work. Ynoa was released by the Leones on June 29.

=== Conspiradores de Querétaro ===
On July 11, 2025, Ynoa signed with the Conspiradores de Querétaro of the Mexican League. In 4 starts he threw 15.2 innings going 0–1 with a 5.17 ERA with 8 walks and 12 strikeouts.

=== Los Angeles Angels ===
On November 26, 2025, Ynoa signed a minor league contract with the Los Angeles Angels. He made 30 appearances (including five starts) for the Triple–A Salt Lake Bees, compiling a 2–2 record and 7.20 ERA with 42 strikeouts across 60 innings of work. Ynoa was released by the Angels organization on August 3, 2026.

== Personal life ==
Ynoa's brother, Michael, also played in Major League Baseball.
