= List of active Major League Baseball players by country of birth =

List of professional baseball players

Number of MLB 26-man players by country (or possession) (2025)
Rank	Country (or possession)	#	%
1	United States	1,081	73.5%
2	Dominican Republic	144	9.8%
3	Venezuela	93	6.3%
4	Cuba	34	2.3%
5	Puerto Rico	27	1.8%
6	Canada	22	1.5%
7	Mexico	15	1%
8	Japan	13	0.9%
9	Colombia	8	0.5%
10	Panama	6	0.4%
11	South Korea	5	0.3%
11	Curaçao (Note: Curaçao is represented by the Netherlands in certain international competitions.)	4	0.3%
13	Nicaragua	3	0.2%
14	Aruba (Note: Aruba is represented by the Netherlands in certain international competitions.)	2	0.1%
14	Australia	2	0.1%
14	Germany	2	0.1%
14	Italy	2	0.1%
14	Taiwan	2	0.1%
19	Bahamas	1	0.1%
19	Honduras	1	0.1%
19	Peru	1	0.1%
19	Portugal	1	0.1%
19	South Africa	1	0.1%
19	United Kingdom	1	0.1%

Major League Baseball is a professional baseball league in Canada and the United States. Players do not register with a country, so nationality is often disputed when international fixtures come around, such as Manny Machado representing the Dominican Republic instead of the United States in the 2017 World Baseball Classic. Similarly, Alex Rodriguez played for the United States in the 2006 World Baseball Classic, but before the 2009 World Baseball Classic he announced his intention to play for the Dominican Republic (though ultimately he didn't play in the 2009 tournament due to injury). And in another example, Marcus Stroman played for the United States in the 2017 World Baseball Classic, but played for Puerto Rico in the 2023 World Baseball Classic. As such, player representation by birth spans to 25 countries as of the 2022 MLB season, with the United States topping the list at 1,057 players called up to 26-man rosters. The most represented overseas country is the Dominican Republic, with 171 players called up to 26-man rosters. The ranking for countries for most MLB players by birth matches well with the WBSC World Rankings, although East Asia and Australia underperforms in MLB and European nations have little to no representation, likely due to acquisition fees, travel to home soil, and/or professional baseball leagues in their home country with good revenue.

== Africa ==
=== South Africa ===
Name	Team	Bats	Throws	Date of birth	Seasons
Tayler Scott	Atlanta Braves	R	R	June 1, 1992 (age 34)	5

== Americas ==
=== Aruba ===
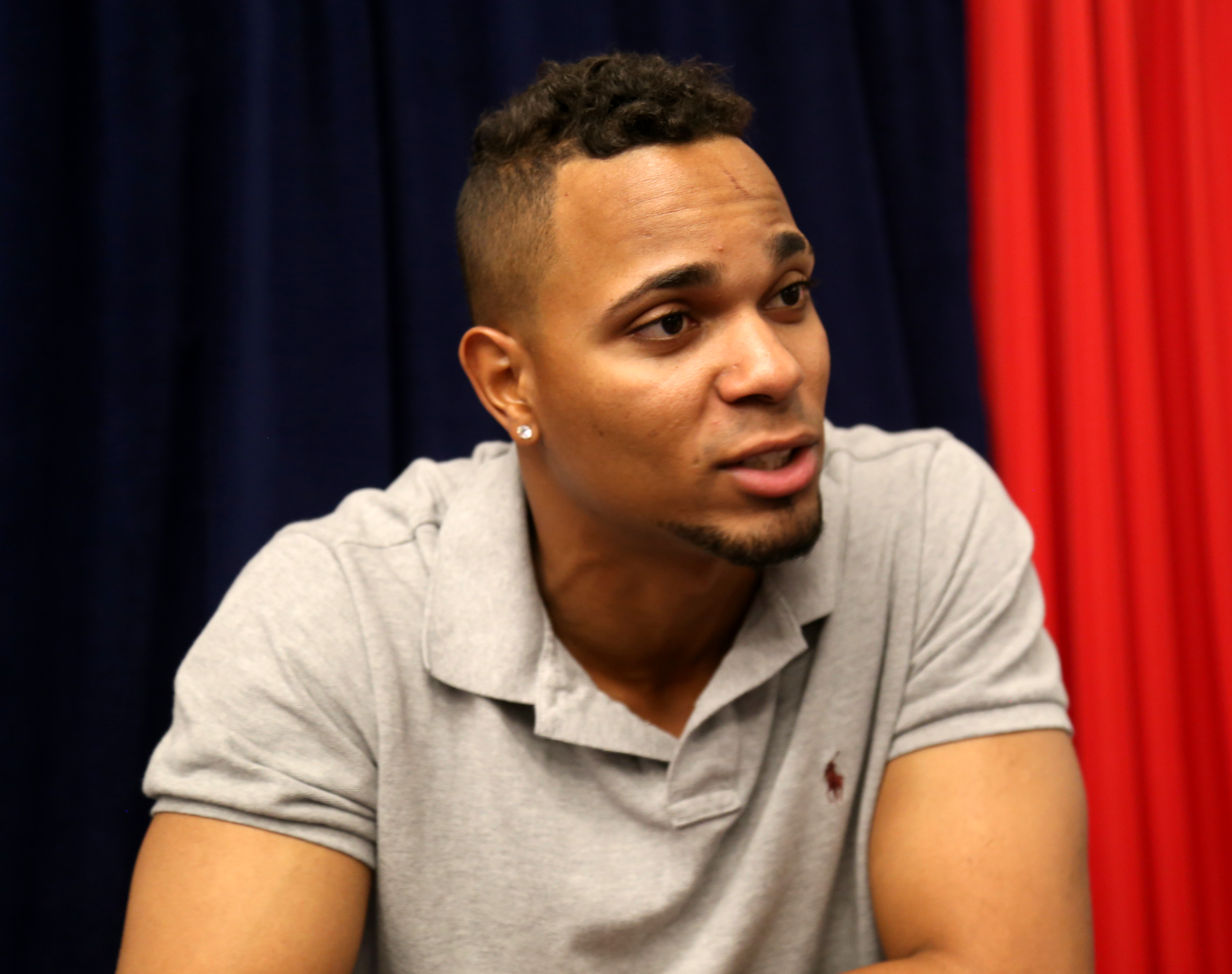
Aruba native Xander Bogaerts in 2016

Name	Team	Bats	Throws	Date of birth	Seasons
Xander Bogaerts	San Diego Padres	R	R	October 1, 1992 (age 34)	13
Chadwick Tromp	Boston Red Sox	R	R	March 21, 1995 (age 31)	6

=== Bahamas ===
Name	Team	Bats	Throws	Date of birth	Seasons
Jazz Chisholm Jr.	New York Yankees	L	R	February 1, 1998 (age 28)	6

=== Brazil ===
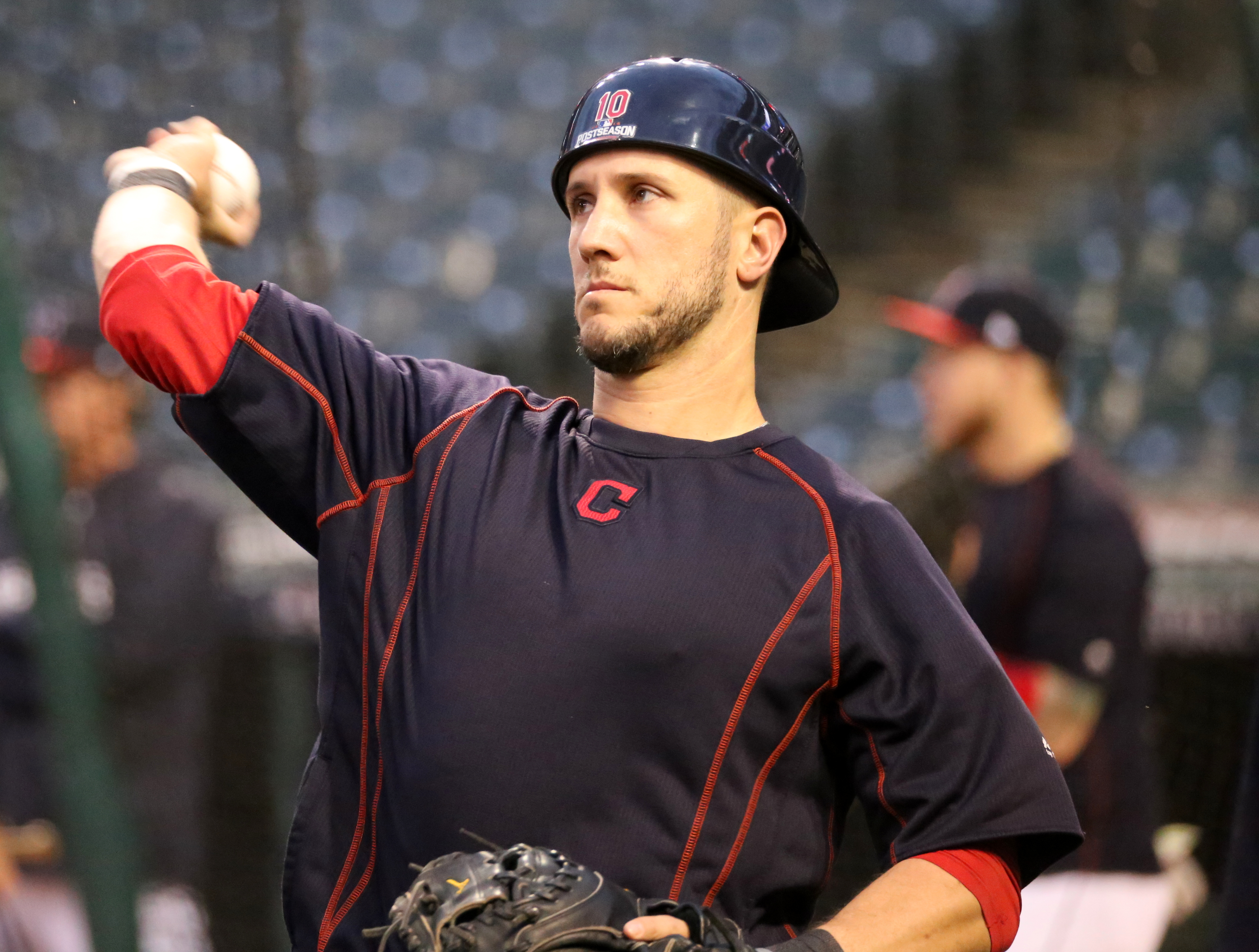
Brazil native Yan Gomes in 2016

Name	Team(s)	Bats	Throws	Date of birth	Seasons
Yan Gomes	Chicago Cubs	R	R	July 19, 1987 (age 39)	12

=== Canada ===
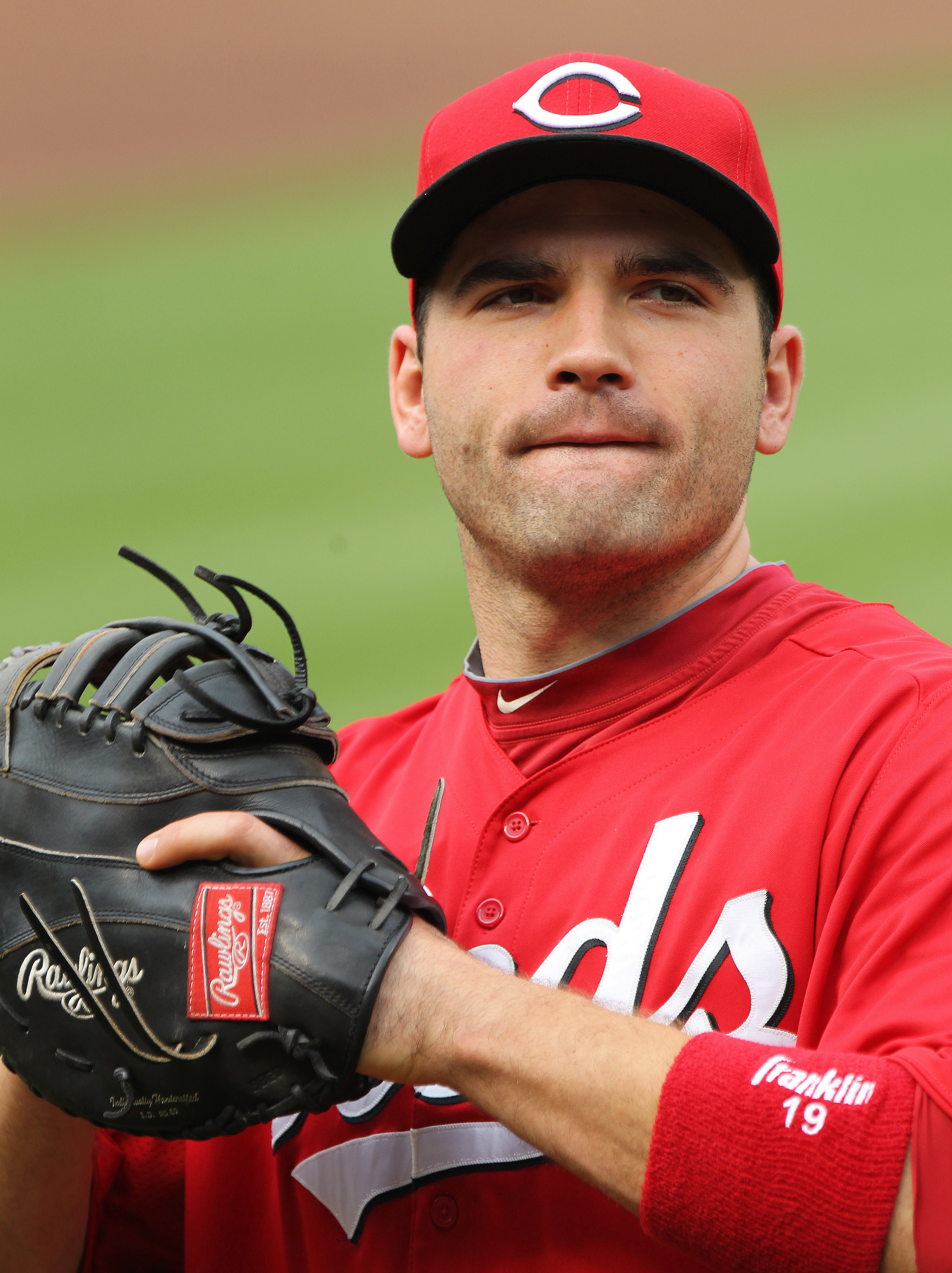
Canada native Joey Votto in 2011

Name	Team	Bats	Throws	Date of birth	Seasons
Tyler Black	Milwaukee Brewers	L	R	July 26, 2000 (age 26)	2
Matt Brash	Seattle Mariners	R	R	May 12, 1998 (age 28)	3
Owen Caissie	Chicago Cubs	L	R	July 8, 2002 (age 24)	1
Denzel Clarke	Athletics	R	R	May 1, 2000 (age 26)	1
Vladimir Guerrero Jr.	Toronto Blue Jays	R	R	March 16, 1999 (age 27)	7
Liam Hicks	Miami Marlins	L	R	June 2, 1999 (age 27)	1
Edouard Julien	Minnesota Twins	L	R	April 30, 1999 (age 27)	3
Bo Naylor	Cleveland Guardians	L	R	February 21, 2000 (age 26)	4
Josh Naylor	Seattle Mariners	L	L	June 22, 1997 (age 29)	7
Tyler O'Neill	Baltimore Orioles	R	R	June 22, 1995 (age 31)	8
Tristan Peters	Tampa Bay Rays	L	R	February 29, 2000 (age 26)	1
Nick Pivetta	San Diego Padres	R	R	February 14, 1993 (age 33)	9
Zach Pop	Chicago Cubs	R	R	September 20, 1996 (age 30)	5
Cal Quantrill	Miami Marlins	L	R	February 10, 1995 (age 31)	7
Jordan Romano	Philadelphia Phillies	R	R	April 21, 1993 (age 33)	7
Erik Sabrowski	Cleveland Guardians	R	L	October 31, 1997 (age 28)	2
Cade Smith	Cleveland Guardians	R	R	May 9, 1999 (age 27)	2
Michael Soroka	Chicago Cubs	R	R	August 4, 1997 (age 29)	6
Jonah Tong	New York Mets	R	R	June 19, 2003 (age 23)	1
Abraham Toro	Boston Red Sox	S	R	December 10, 1996 (age 29)	7
Jared Young	New York Mets	L	R	July 9, 1995 (age 31)	3
Rob Zastryzny	Milwaukee Brewers	R	L	March 26, 1992 (age 34)	7

=== Colombia ===
Name	Team	Bats	Throws	Date of birth	Seasons
Gustavo Campero	Los Angeles Angels	S	R	September 20, 1997 (age 29)	2
Didier Fuentes	Atlanta Braves	R	R	June 17, 2005 (age 21)	1
Donovan Solano	Free Agent	R	R	December 17, 1987 (age 38)	12
José Quintana	Milwaukee Brewers	R	L	January 24, 1989 (age 37)	14
Gio Urshela	Athletics	R	R	October 11, 1991 (age 35)	10

=== Cuba ===
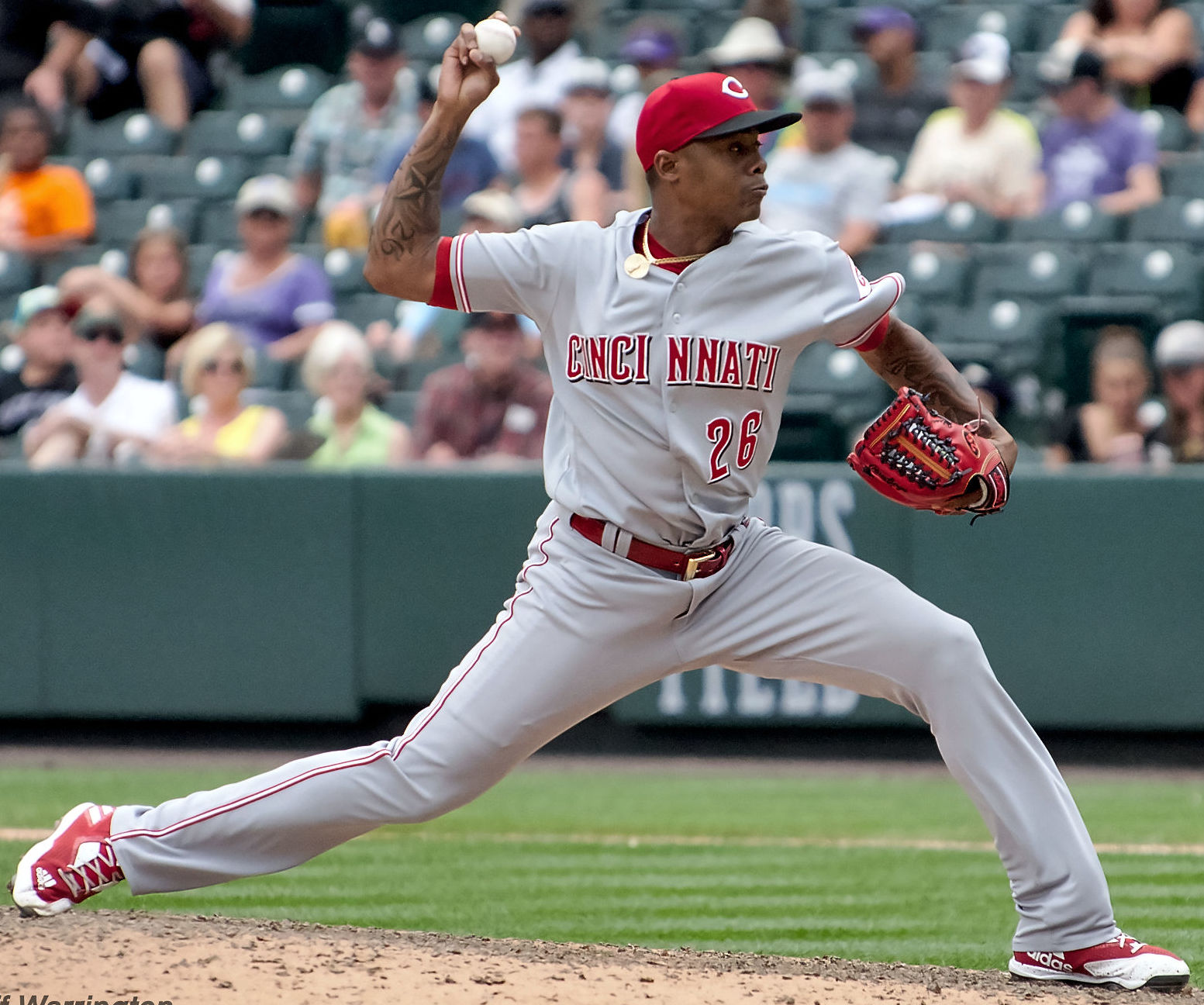
Cuba native Raisel Iglesias in 2017

Name	Team	Bats	Throws	Date of birth	Seasons
Yordan Alvarez	Houston Astros	L	R	June 27, 1997 (age 29)	7
Randy Arozarena	Seattle Mariners	R	R	February 28, 1995 (age 31)	7
José Barrero	Baltimore Orioles	R	R	April 5, 1998 (age 28)	5
Dairon Blanco	Kansas City Royals	R	R	April 26, 1993 (age 33)	4
Yennier Canó	Baltimore Orioles	R	R	March 9, 1994 (age 32)	4
Aroldis Chapman	Boston Red Sox	L	L	February 28, 1988 (age 38)	16
Nestor Cortes Jr.	San Diego Padres	R	L	December 10, 1994 (age 31)	8
Yandy Díaz	Tampa Bay Rays	R	R	August 8, 1991 (age 35)	9
Lázaro Estrada	Toronto Blue Jays	R	R	April 24, 1999 (age 27)	1
Yanquiel Fernández	Colorado Rockies	L	L	January 1, 2003 (age 23)	1
Adolis García	Texas Rangers	R	R	March 2, 1993 (age 33)	7
Lourdes Gurriel Jr.	Arizona Diamondbacks	R	R	October 10, 1993 (age 33)	8
Yuli Gurriel	San Diego Padres	R	R	June 9, 1984 (age 42)	10
Daysbel Hernández	Atlanta Braves	R	R	September 15, 1996 (age 30)	3
Andy Ibáñez	Detroit Tigers	R	R	April 3, 1993 (age 33)	5
José Iglesias	San Diego Padres	R	R	January 5, 1990 (age 36)	13
Raisel Iglesias	Atlanta Braves	R	R	January 4, 1990 (age 36)	11
Víctor Mederos	Los Angeles Angels	R	R	June 8, 2001 (age 25)	3
Víctor Mesa Jr.	Miami Marlins	L	L	September 8, 2001 (age 25)	1
Yoán Moncada	Los Angeles Angels	S	R	May 27, 1995 (age 31)	10
Luis Morales	Athletics	R	R	September 24, 2002 (age 24)	1
Adrián Morejón	San Diego Padres	L	L	February 27, 1999 (age 27)	7
Johan Oviedo	Pittsburgh Pirates	R	R	March 2, 1998 (age 28)	5
Andy Pages	Los Angeles Dodgers	R	R	December 8, 2000 (age 25)	2
Cionel Pérez	Baltimore Orioles	R	L	April 21, 1996 (age 30)	8
Edgar Quero	Chicago White Sox	S	R	April 6, 2003 (age 23)	1
Orlando Ribalta	Washington Nationals	R	R	March 5, 1998 (age 28)	2
Luis Robert Jr.	Chicago White Sox	R	R	August 3, 1997 (age 29)	6
Yariel Rodríguez	Toronto Blue Jays	R	R	March 10, 1997 (age 29)	2
Jorge Soler	Los Angeles Angels	R	R	February 25, 1992 (age 34)	12
Miguel Vargas	Chicago White Sox	R	R	November 17, 1999 (age 26)	4
Yosver Zulueta	Cincinnati Reds	R	R	January 23, 1998 (age 28)	2

=== Curaçao ===
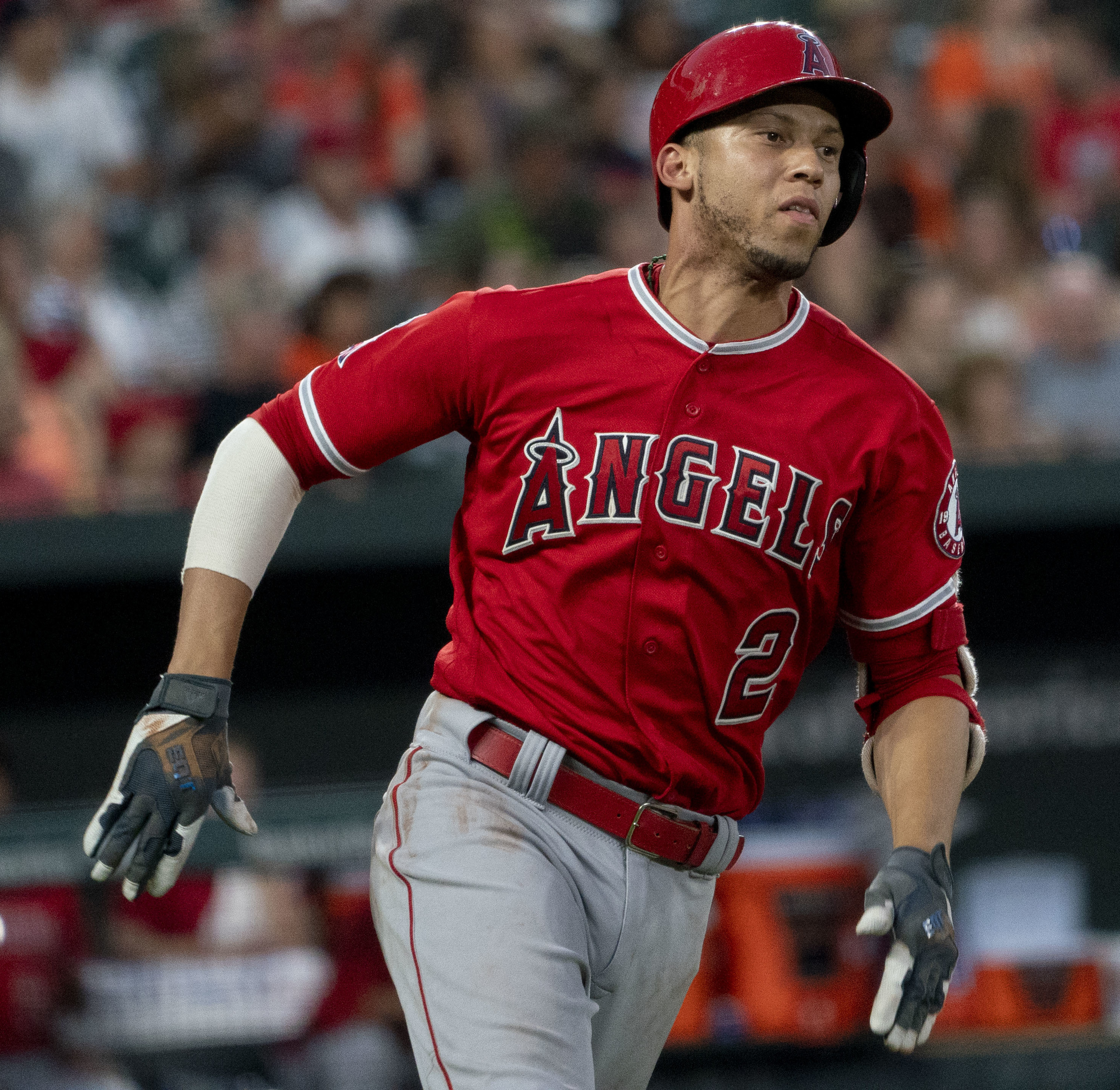
Curaçao native Andrelton Simmons in 2018

Name	Team	Bats	Throws	Date of birth
Ozzie Albies	Atlanta Braves	S	R	January 7, 1997 (age 29)
Kenley Jansen	Los Angeles Angels	S	R	September 30, 1987 (age 39)
Jurickson Profar	Atlanta Braves	S	R	February 20, 1993 (age 33)
Ceddanne Rafaela	Boston Red Sox	R	R	September 18, 2000 (age 26)

=== Dominican Republic ===
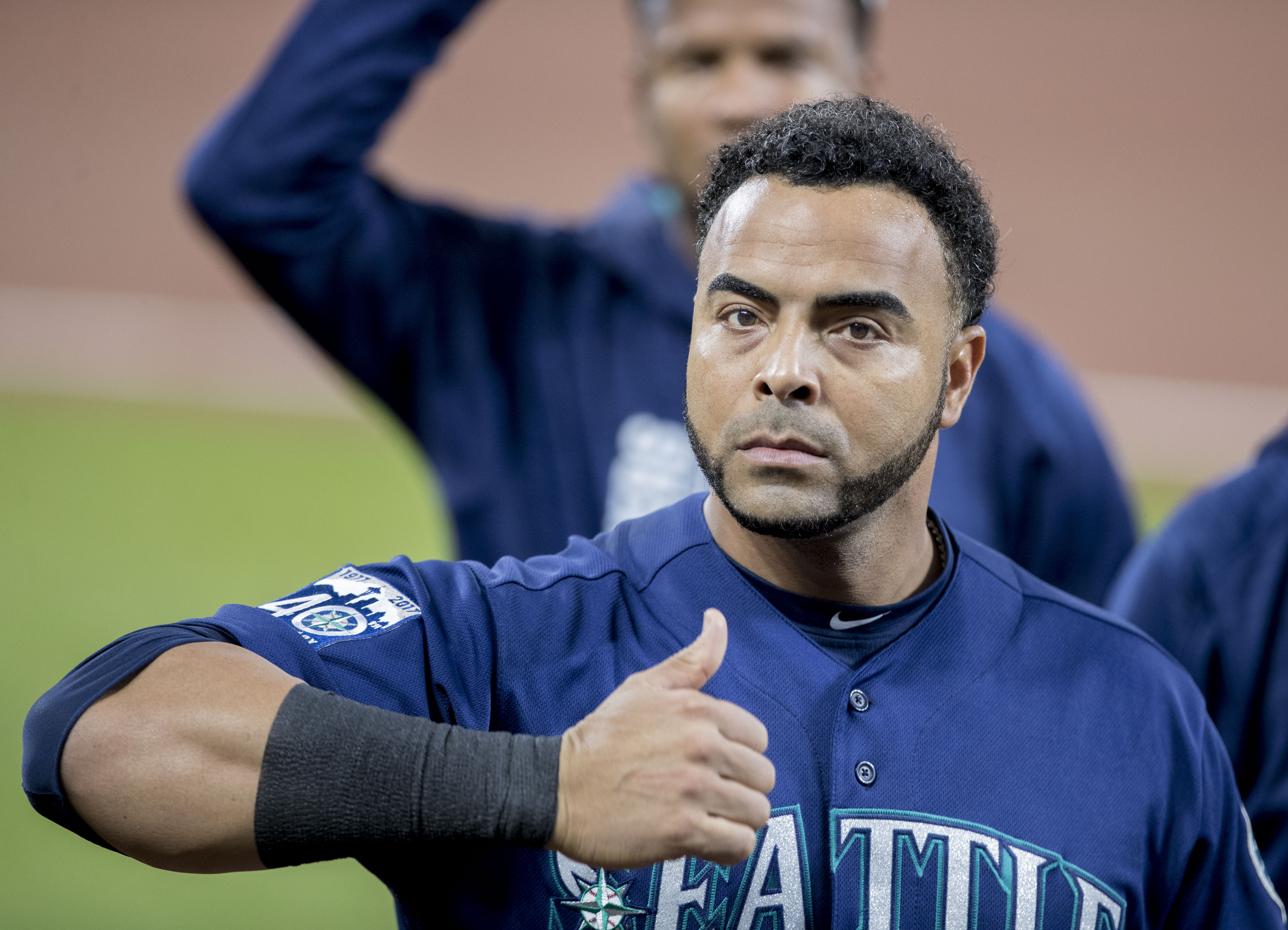
Nelson Cruz in 2017

Name	Team	Bats	Throws	Date of birth	Seasons
Albert Abreu	Texas Rangers	R	R	September 26, 1995 (age 31)	2
Bryan Abreu	Houston Astros	R	R	April 22, 1997 (age 29)	3
Domingo Acevedo	Oakland Athletics	R	R	March 6, 1994 (age 32)	1
Joan Adon	Washington Nationals	R	R	August 12, 1998 (age 28)	1
Hanser Alberto	Los Angeles Dodgers	R	R	October 17, 1992 (age 34)	6
Jorge Alcalá	Minnesota Twins	R	R	July 28, 1995 (age 31)	3
Sandy Alcántara	Miami Marlins	R	R	September 7, 1995 (age 31)	5
Sergio Alcántara	San Diego Padres	S	R	July 10, 1996 (age 30)	2
Abraham Almonte	Boston Red Sox	S	R	June 27, 1989 (age 37)	9
Miguel Andújar	Oakland Athletics	R	R	March 2, 1995 (age 31)	8
Aristides Aquino	Cincinnati Reds	R	R	April 22, 1994 (age 32)	4
Pedro Báez	Los Angeles Dodgers	R	R	March 11, 1988 (age 38)	8
Luis Barrera	Oakland Athletics	L	L	November 15, 1995 (age 30)	1
Jorge Bonifacio	Free agent	R	R	June 4, 1993 (age 33)	5
Vidal Bruján	Tampa Bay Rays	S	R	February 9, 1998 (age 28)	1
Adonis Medina	New York Mets	R	R	December 18, 1996 (age 29)	2
Álex Colomé	Colorado Rockies	R	R	December 31, 1988 (age 37)	9
Amed Rosario	Tampa Bay Rays	R	R	November 20, 1995 (age 30)	5
Ángel Perdomo	Milwaukee Brewers	L	L	May 7, 1994 (age 32)	2
Angel Rondón	St. Louis Cardinals	R	R	December 1, 1997 (age 28)	1
Antonio Santos	New York Mets	R	R	October 6, 1996 (age 30)	2
Bryan De La Cruz	Miami Marlins	R	R	December 16, 1996 (age 29)	1
Camilo Doval	San Francisco Giants	R	R	July 4, 1997 (age 29)	1
Carlos Estévez	Colorado Rockies	R	R	December 28, 1992 (age 33)	5
Carlos Martínez	Boston Red Sox	R	R	September 21, 1991 (age 35)	9
Carlos Santana	Minnesota Twins	S	R	April 8, 1986 (age 40)	12
César Valdez	Los Angeles Angels	R	R	March 17, 1985 (age 41)	4
Cristian Javier	Houston Astros	R	R	March 26, 1997 (age 29)	2
Cristian Pache	Oakland Athletics	R	R	November 19, 1998 (age 27)	2
Cristopher Sánchez	Philadelphia Phillies	L	L	December 12, 1996 (age 29)	1
Dauri Moreta	Cincinnati Reds	R	R	April 15, 1996 (age 30)	1
Deivi García	New York Yankees	R	R	May 19, 1999 (age 27)	2
Dennis Santana	Texas Rangers	R	R	April 12, 1996 (age 30)	4
Diego Castillo	Seattle Mariners	R	R	January 18, 1994 (age 32)	4
Dinelson Lamet	San Diego Padres	R	R	July 18, 1992 (age 34)	4
Domingo Germán	Pittsburgh Pirates	R	R	August 4, 1992 (age 34)	8
Domingo Leyba	San Diego Padres	S	R	September 11, 1995 (age 31)	2
Domingo Tapia	Oakland Athletics	R	R	August 4, 1991 (age 35)	2
Edward Cabrera	Miami Marlins	R	R	April 13, 1998 (age 28)	1
Edwin Uceta	Arizona Diamondbacks	R	R	January 9, 1998 (age 28)	1
Eloy Jiménez	Chicago White Sox	R	R	November 27, 1996 (age 29)	3
Elvis Peguero	Los Angeles Angels	R	R	March 20, 1997 (age 29)	1
Emmanuel Clase	Cleveland Guardians	R	R	March 18, 1998 (age 28)	2
Enoli Paredes	Houston Astros	R	R	September 28, 1995 (age 31)	2
Enyel De Los Santos	Cleveland Guardians	R	R	December 25, 1995 (age 30)	3
Erik González	Miami Marlins	R	R	August 31, 1991 (age 35)	6
Ervin Santana	Kansas City Royals	R	R	December 12, 1982 (age 43)	16
Estevan Florial	New York Yankees	L	R	November 25, 1997 (age 28)	2
Félix Peña	New York Mets	R	R	February 25, 1990 (age 36)	6
Fernando Tatís Jr.	San Diego Padres	R	R	January 2, 1999 (age 27)	3
Framber Valdez	Houston Astros	R	L	November 19, 1993 (age 32)	4
Franchy Cordero	Boston Red Sox	L	R	September 2, 1994 (age 32)	5
Francisco Mejia	Tampa Bay Rays	S	R	October 27, 1995 (age 30)	5
Francisco Pérez	Washington Nationals	S	L	July 20, 1997 (age 29)	1
Frankie Montas	Oakland Athletics	R	R	March 21, 1993 (age 33)	6
Franmil Reyes	Cleveland Guardians	R	R	July 7, 1995 (age 31)	4
Freddy Peralta	Milwaukee Brewers	R	R	June 4, 1996 (age 30)	4
Gary Sánchez	Minnesota Twins	R	R	December 2, 1992 (age 33)	7
Génesis Cabrera	St. Louis Cardinals	L	L	October 10, 1996 (age 30)	3
Geraldo Perdomo	Arizona Diamondbacks	S	R	October 22, 1999 (age 27)	1
Gilberto Celestino	Minnesota Twins	R	L	February 13, 1999 (age 27)	1
Gregory Santos	San Francisco Giants	R	R	August 28, 1999 (age 27)	1
Gregory Soto	Philadelphia Phillies	L	L	February 11, 1995 (age 31)	3
Hansel Robles	Boston Red Sox	R	R	August 13, 1990 (age 36)	7
Héctor Neris	Houston Astros	R	R	June 14, 1989 (age 37)	8
Huascar Ynoa	Atlanta Braves	R	R	May 28, 1998 (age 28)	3
Iván Castillo	Kansas City Royals	S	R	May 30, 1995 (age 31)	1
J. C. Mejía	Milwaukee Brewers	R	R	August 26, 1996 (age 30)	1
Jandel Gustave	Milwaukee Brewers	R	R	October 12, 1992 (age 34)	4
Jarlin García	San Francisco Giants	L	L	January 18, 1993 (age 33)	5
Jean Segura	Philadelphia Phillies	R	R	March 17, 1990 (age 36)	10
Jefry Rodríguez	Washington Nationals	R	R	July 26, 1993 (age 33)	3
Jesús Sánchez	Miami Marlins	L	R	October 7, 1997 (age 29)	2
Jeurys Familia	Philadelphia Phillies	R	R	October 10, 1989 (age 37)	10
Joel Payamps	Kansas City Royals	R	R	April 7, 1994 (age 32)	3
Joely Rodríguez	New York Mets	L	L	November 14, 1991 (age 34)	4
Johnny Cueto	Chicago White Sox	R	R	February 15, 1986 (age 40)	14
Jonathan Villar	Chicago Cubs	S	R	May 2, 1991 (age 35)	9
Jorge Guzmán	San Francisco Giants	R	R	January 28, 1996 (age 30)	2
Jorge Mateo	Baltimore Orioles	R	R	June 23, 1995 (age 31)	2
Jorge Polanco	Minnesota Twins	S	R	July 5, 1993 (age 33)	8
José Cisnero	Detroit Tigers	R	R	April 11, 1989 (age 37)	5
José Devers	Miami Marlins	L	R	December 7, 1999 (age 26)	1
José Marte	Los Angeles Angels	R	R	June 14, 1996 (age 30)	1
José Ramírez	Cleveland Guardians	S	R	September 17, 1992 (age 34)	9
José Siri	Houston Astros	R	R	July 22, 1995 (age 31)	1
José Ureña	Colorado Rockies	R	R	September 12, 1991 (age 35)	7
Juan Lagares	Los Angeles Angels	R	R	March 17, 1989 (age 37)	9
Juan Minaya	Minnesota Twins	R	R	September 18, 1990 (age 36)	5
Juan Soto	New York Yankees	L	L	October 25, 1998 (age 28)	4
Julián Fernández	Colorado Rockies	R	R	December 5, 1995 (age 30)	1
Junior Fernández	St. Louis Cardinals	R	R	March 2, 1997 (age 29)	3
Kelvin Gutiérrez	Baltimore Orioles	R	R	August 28, 1994 (age 32)	3
Ketel Marte	Arizona Diamondbacks	S	R	October 12, 1993 (age 33)	7
Leody Taveras	Texas Rangers	S	R	September 8, 1998 (age 28)	2
Leury García	Chicago White Sox	S	R	March 18, 1991 (age 35)	9
Lewin Díaz	Miami Marlins	L	L	November 19, 1996 (age 29)	2
Luis Castillo	Cincinnati Reds	R	R	December 12, 1992 (age 33)	5
Luis Frías	Arizona Diamondbacks	R	R	May 23, 1998 (age 28)	1
Luis García	San Diego Padres	R	R	January 30, 1987 (age 39)	9
Luis Gil	New York Yankees	R	R	June 3, 1998 (age 28)	1
Luis Severino	New York Yankees	R	R	February 20, 1994 (age 32)	6
Magneuris Sierra	Los Angeles Angels	L	L	April 7, 1996 (age 30)	5
Maikel Franco	Washington Nationals	R	R	August 26, 1992 (age 34)	8
Manuel Margot	Tampa Bay Rays	R	R	September 28, 1994 (age 32)	6
Marcell Ozuna	Atlanta Braves	R	R	November 12, 1990 (age 35)	9
Marcos Diplán	Baltimore Orioles	R	R	September 18, 1996 (age 30)	1
Michael Feliz	Boston Red Sox	R	R	June 28, 1993 (age 33)	7
Michael Pineda	Detroit Tigers	R	R	January 18, 1989 (age 37)	8
Miguel Castro	New York Yankees	R	R	December 24, 1994 (age 31)	7
Miguel Del Pozo	Detroit Tigers	L	L	October 14, 1992 (age 34)	3
Miguel Díaz	Detroit Tigers	R	R	November 28, 1994 (age 31)	4
Miguel Sánchez	Milwaukee Brewers	R	R	December 31, 1993 (age 32)	1
Miguel Sanó	Minnesota Twins	R	R	May 11, 1993 (age 33)	7
Nelson Cruz	Washington Nationals	R	R	July 1, 1980 (age 46)	17
Nomar Mazara	San Diego Padres	L	L	April 26, 1995 (age 31)	6
Oliver Ortega	Los Angeles Angels	R	R	October 2, 1996 (age 30)	1
Oneil Cruz	Pittsburgh Pirates	L	R	October 4, 1998 (age 28)	1
Otto López	Toronto Blue Jays	R	R	October 1, 1998 (age 28)	1
Pablo Reyes	Milwaukee Brewers	R	R	September 5, 1993 (age 33)	3
Pedro Severino	Milwaukee Brewers	R	R	July 20, 1993 (age 33)	7
Phillips Valdéz	Boston Red Sox	R	R	November 16, 1991 (age 34)	3
Rafael Devers	Boston Red Sox	L	R	October 24, 1996 (age 30)	5
Rafael Dolis	Chicago White Sox	R	R	January 10, 1988 (age 38)	5
Rafael Montero	Houston Astros	R	R	October 17, 1990 (age 36)	7
Raimel Tapia	Toronto Blue Jays	L	L	February 4, 1994 (age 32)	6
Ramón Laureano	Oakland Athletics	R	R	July 15, 1994 (age 32)	4
Ramón Rosso	Detroit Tigers	R	R	June 9, 1996 (age 30)	2
Raynel Espinal	San Francisco Giants	R	R	October 6, 1991 (age 35)	1
Reyes Moronta	Los Angeles Dodgers	R	R	January 6, 1993 (age 33)	4
Reynaldo López	Chicago White Sox	R	R	January 4, 1994 (age 32)	6
Richard Rodríguez	Free agent	R	R	March 4, 1990 (age 36)	5
Roansy Contreras	Pittsburgh Pirates	R	R	November 7, 1999 (age 26)	1
Robel García	Chicago Cubs	S	R	March 28, 1993 (age 33)	2
Rodolfo Castro	Pittsburgh Pirates	S	R	May 21, 1999 (age 27)	1
Ronald Guzmán	New York Yankees	L	L	October 20, 1994 (age 32)	4
Rony García	Detroit Tigers	R	R	December 19, 1997 (age 28)	2
Santiago Espinal	Toronto Blue Jays	R	R	November 13, 1994 (age 31)	2
Seranthony Domínguez	Philadelphia Phillies	R	R	November 25, 1994 (age 31)	3
Starlin Castro	Free agent	R	R	March 24, 1990 (age 36)	12
Starling Marte	New York Mets	R	R	October 9, 1988 (age 38)	10
Teoscar Hernández	Los Angeles Dodgers	R	R	October 15, 1992 (age 34)	6
Víctor Robles	Washington Nationals	R	R	May 19, 1997 (age 29)	5
Wander Franco	Tampa Bay Rays	S	R	March 1, 2001 (age 25)	1
Wander Suero	Los Angeles Angels	R	R	September 15, 1991 (age 35)	4
Wandy Peralta	New York Yankees	L	L	July 27, 1991 (age 35)	6
Webster Rivas	San Diego Padres	R	R	August 8, 1990 (age 36)	1
Wilmer Difo	Arizona Diamondbacks	S	R	April 2, 1992 (age 34)	7
Wily Peralta	Detroit Tigers	R	R	May 8, 1989 (age 37)	9
Yairo Muñoz	Philadelphia Phillies	R	R	January 23, 1995 (age 31)	4
Yefry Ramírez	Los Angeles Dodgers	R	R	November 28, 1993 (age 32)	3
Yennsy Díaz	New York Mets	R	R	November 15, 1996 (age 29)	2
Yermín Mercedes	Chicago White Sox	R	R	February 14, 1993 (age 33)	2
Yimi García	Toronto Blue Jays	R	R	August 18, 1990 (age 36)	7
Yohan Ramírez	Cleveland Guardians	R	R	May 6, 1995 (age 31)	2

=== Honduras ===
Name	Team	Bats	Throws	Date of birth	Seasons
Mauricio Dubón	Houston Astros	R	R	July 19, 1994 (age 32)	7

=== Mexico ===
Name	Team	Bats	Throws	Date of birth	Seasons
Jonathan Aranda	Tampa Bay Rays	L	R	May 23, 1998 (age 28)	4
Javier Assad	Chicago Cubs	R	R	July 30, 1997 (age 29)	4
Valente Bellozo	Miami Marlins	R	R	January 4, 2000 (age 26)	2
Omar Cruz	San Diego Padres	L	L	January 26, 1999 (age 27)	1
Alejandro Kirk	Toronto Blue Jays	R	R	November 6, 1998 (age 27)	6
Andrés Muñoz	Seattle Mariners	R	R	January 16, 1999 (age 27)	6
Tirso Ornelas	San Diego Padres	L	R	March 11, 2000 (age 26)	1
Alejandro Osuna	Texas Rangers	L	L	October 10, 2002 (age 24)	1
Isaac Paredes	Houston Astros	R	R	February 18, 1999 (age 27)	6
Alan Rangel	Philadelphia Phillies	R	R	August 21, 1997 (age 29)	1
Manuel Rodríguez	Tampa Bay Rays	R	R	August 6, 1996 (age 30)	4
César Salazar	Houston Astros	L	R	March 15, 1996 (age 30)	3
Luis Urías	Athletics	R	R	June 3, 1997 (age 29)	8
Ramón Urías	Houston Astros	R	R	June 3, 1994 (age 32)	6

=== Nicaragua ===
Name	Team	Bats	Throws	Date of birth	Seasons
Erasmo Ramírez	Minnesota Twins	R	R	May 2, 1990 (age 36)	14
Jonathan Loáisiga	New York Yankees	R	R	November 2, 1994 (age 31)	8
Carlos Rodríguez	Milwaukee Brewers	R	R	November 27, 2001 (age 24)	2

=== Panama ===
Name	Team	Bats	Throws	Date of birth	Seasons
Miguel Amaya	Chicago Cubs	R	R	March 9, 1999 (age 27)	3
Christian Bethancourt	Tampa Bay Rays	R	R	September 2, 1991 (age 35)	8
José Caballero	New York Yankees	R	R	August 30, 1996 (age 30)	3
Iván Herrera	St. Louis Cardinals	R	R	June 1, 2000 (age 26)	4
Leo Jiménez	Toronto Blue Jays	R	R	May 17, 2001 (age 25)	2
Justin Lawrence	Pittsburgh Pirates	R	R	November 25, 1994 (age 31)	5
Edmundo Sosa	Philadelphia Phillies	R	R	March 6, 1996 (age 30)	7

=== Peru ===
Name	Team	Bats	Throws	Date of birth	Seasons
Jesús Luzardo	Philadelphia Phillies	L	L	September 30, 1997 (age 29)	7

=== Puerto Rico ===
Name	Team	Bats	Throws	Date of birth	Seasons
José Berríos	Toronto Blue Jays	R	R	May 27, 1994 (age 32)	7
Javier Báez	Detroit Tigers	R	R	December 1, 1992 (age 33)	9
Víctor Caratini	Milwaukee Brewers	S	R	August 17, 1993 (age 33)	6
Willi Castro	Minnesota Twins	S	R	April 24, 1997 (age 29)	4
Alex Claudio	New York Mets	L	L	January 31, 1992 (age 34)	9
Carlos Correa	Minnesota Twins	R	R	September 22, 1994 (age 32)	8
Fernando Cruz	Cincinnati Reds	R	R	March 28, 1990 (age 36)	1
Alexis Díaz	Cincinnati Reds	R	R	September 28, 1996 (age 30)	1
Edwin Díaz	New York Mets	R	R	March 22, 1994 (age 32)	7
Mario Feliciano	Milwaukee Brewers	R	R	November 20, 1998 (age 27)	2
Enrique Hernández	Boston Red Sox	R	R	August 24, 1991 (age 35)	9
Joe Jiménez	Atlanta Braves	R	R	January 17, 1995 (age 31)	6
Francisco Lindor	New York Mets	S	R	November 14, 1993 (age 32)	8
Jorge López	Minnesota Twins	R	R	February 10, 1993 (age 33)	7
Vimael Machín	Oakland Athletics	L	R	September 25, 1993 (age 33)	3
Martín Maldonado	Houston Astros	R	R	August 16, 1986 (age 40)	12
José Miranda	Minnesota Twins	R	R	June 29, 1998 (age 28)	1
Yadier Molina	St. Louis Cardinals	R	R	July 13, 1982 (age 44)	19
Jovani Morán	Minnesota Twins	L	L	April 24, 1997 (age 29)	2
Tomás Nido	New York Mets	R	R	April 12, 1994 (age 32)	6
Michael Pérez	New York Mets	L	R	August 7, 1992 (age 34)	5
Roberto Pérez	Pittsburgh Pirates	R	R	December 23, 1988 (age 37)	9
Heliot Ramos	San Francisco Giants	R	R	September 7, 1999 (age 27)	1
Emmanuel Rivera	Arizona Diamondbacks	R	R	June 29, 1996 (age 30)	2
Eddie Rosario	Atlanta Braves	L	R	September 28, 1991 (age 35)	8
Edwin Ríos	Los Angeles Dodgers	L	R	April 21, 1994 (age 32)	4
Christian Vázquez	Houston Astros	R	R	August 21, 1990 (age 36)	8
Nelson Velázquez	Chicago Cubs	R	R	December 26, 1998 (age 27)	1

=== United States ===
Name	Team	Bats	Throws	Date of birth	Seasons
A. J. Alexy	Texas Rangers	R	R	April 21, 1998 (age 28)	1
A. J. Cole	Toronto Blue Jays	R	R	January 5, 1992 (age 34)	7
A. J. Minter	Atlanta Braves	L	L	September 2, 1993 (age 33)	5
A. J. Puk	Oakland Athletics	L	L	April 25, 1995 (age 31)	2
Aaron Ashby	Milwaukee Brewers	R	L	May 24, 1998 (age 28)	1
Aaron Bummer	Chicago White Sox	L	L	September 21, 1993 (age 33)	5
Aaron Civale	Cleveland Indians	R	R	June 12, 1995 (age 31)	3
Aaron Fletcher	Seattle Mariners	L	L	February 25, 1996 (age 30)	2
Aaron Hicks	Los Angeles Angels	S	R	October 2, 1989 (age 37)	12
Aaron Judge	New York Yankees	R	R	April 26, 1992 (age 34)	9
Aaron Loup	New York Mets	L	L	December 19, 1987 (age 38)	10
Aaron Nola	Philadelphia Phillies	R	R	June 4, 1993 (age 33)	7
Aaron Northcraft	San Diego Padres	R	R	May 28, 1990 (age 36)	1
Aaron Sanchez	San Francisco Giants	R	R	July 1, 1992 (age 34)	7
Aaron Slegers	Los Angeles Angels	R	R	September 4, 1992 (age 34)	5
Adalberto Mondesi	Kansas City Royals	B	R	July 27, 1995 (age 31)	7
Adam Cimber	Miami Marlins; Toronto Blue Jays	R	R	August 15, 1990 (age 36)	4
Adam Duvall	Atlanta Braves	R	R	September 4, 1988 (age 38)	8
Adam Eaton	Chicago White Sox; Los Angeles Angels	L	L	December 6, 1988 (age 37)	10
Adam Engel	Chicago White Sox	R	R	December 9, 1991 (age 34)	5
Adam Frazier	Seattle Mariners	L	R	December 14, 1991 (age 34)	6
Adam Haseley	Chicago White Sox	L	L	April 12, 1996 (age 30)	3
Adam Kolarek	Oakland Athletics	L	L	January 14, 1989 (age 37)	5
Adam Morgan	Chicago Cubs	L	L	February 27, 1990 (age 36)	7
Adam Ottavino	Boston Red Sox	B	R	November 22, 1985 (age 40)	11
Adam Plutko	Baltimore Orioles	R	R	October 3, 1991 (age 35)	5
Adam Wainwright	St. Louis Cardinals	R	R	August 30, 1981 (age 45)	16
Adrian Houser	Milwaukee Brewers	R	R	February 2, 1993 (age 33)	5
Adrian Sampson	Chicago Cubs	R	R	October 7, 1991 (age 35)	4
AJ Pollock	Chicago White Sox	R	R	December 5, 1987 (age 38)	10
AJ Ramos	Los Angeles Angels	R	R	September 20, 1986 (age 40)	9
Akeem Bostick	New York Mets	R	R	May 4, 1995 (age 31)	1
Akil Baddoo	Detroit Tigers	L	L	August 16, 1998 (age 28)	1
Alan Trejo	Colorado Rockies	R	R	May 30, 1996 (age 30)	1
Albert Almora	Cincinnati Reds	R	R	April 16, 1994 (age 32)	6
Alec Bettinger	Milwaukee Brewers	R	R	July 13, 1995 (age 31)	1
Alec Bohm	Philadelphia Phillies	R	R	August 3, 1996 (age 30)	2
Alec Mills	Chicago Cubs	R	R	November 30, 1991 (age 34)	5
Alek Manoah	Toronto Blue Jays	R	R	January 9, 1998 (age 28)	1
Alex Avila	Washington Nationals	L	R	January 29, 1987 (age 39)	13
Alex Blandino	Cincinnati Reds	R	R	November 6, 1992 (age 33)	3
Alex Bregman	Houston Astros	R	R	March 30, 1994 (age 32)	6
Alex Cobb	Los Angeles Angels	R	R	October 7, 1987 (age 39)	10
Alex De Goti	Houston Astros	R	R	August 19, 1994 (age 32)	1
Alex Dickerson	Atlanta Braves	L	L	May 26, 1990 (age 36)	5
Alex Jackson	Milwaukee Brewers	R	R	December 25, 1995 (age 30)	3
Alex Kirilloff	Minnesota Twins	L	L	November 9, 1997 (age 28)	2
Alex Lange	Detroit Tigers	R	R	October 2, 1995 (age 31)	1
Alex McRae	Chicago White Sox	R	R	April 6, 1993 (age 33)	4
Alex Reyes	St. Louis Cardinals	R	R	August 29, 1994 (age 32)	5
Alex Verdugo	Boston Red Sox	L	L	May 15, 1996 (age 30)	5
Alex Vesia	Los Angeles Dodgers	L	L	April 11, 1996 (age 30)	2
Alex Wood	San Francisco Giants	R	L	January 12, 1991 (age 35)	9
Alex Young	Arizona Diamondbacks; Cleveland Indians	L	L	September 9, 1993 (age 33)	3
Alfonso Rivas	Chicago Cubs	L	L	September 13, 1996 (age 30)	1
Amir Garrett	Cincinnati Reds	R	L	May 3, 1992 (age 34)	5
Andre Jackson	Los Angeles Dodgers	R	R	May 1, 1996 (age 30)	1
Andre Scrubb	Houston Astros	R	R	January 13, 1995 (age 31)	2
Andrew Bellatti	Miami Marlins	R	R	August 5, 1991 (age 35)	2
Andrew Benintendi	Kansas City Royals	L	L	July 6, 1994 (age 32)	6
Andrew Chafin	Chicago Cubs; Oakland Athletics	R	L	June 17, 1990 (age 36)	8
Andrew Heaney	Los Angeles Angels; New York Yankees	L	L	June 5, 1991 (age 35)	8
Andrew Kittredge	Tampa Bay Rays	R	R	March 17, 1990 (age 36)	5
Andrew Knapp	Philadelphia Phillies	B	R	November 9, 1991 (age 34)	5
Andrew Knizner	St. Louis Cardinals	R	R	February 3, 1995 (age 31)	3
Andrew McCutchen	Milwaukee Brewers	R	R	October 10, 1986 (age 40)	13
Andrew Miller	St. Louis Cardinals	L	L	May 21, 1985 (age 41)	16
Andrew Romine	Chicago Cubs	B	R	December 24, 1985 (age 40)	11
Andrew Stevenson	Washington Nationals	L	L	June 1, 1994 (age 32)	5
Andrew Vasquez	Los Angeles Dodgers	L	L	September 14, 1993 (age 33)	3
Andrew Vaughn	Chicago White Sox	R	R	April 3, 1998 (age 28)	1
Andrew Velazquez	Los Angeles Angels	S	R	July 14, 1994 (age 32)	4
Andrew Wantz	Los Angeles Angels	R	R	October 13, 1995 (age 31)	1
Andrew Young	Arizona Diamondbacks	R	R	May 10, 1994 (age 32)	2
Andy Burns	Los Angeles Dodgers	R	R	August 7, 1990 (age 36)	2
Anthony Alford	Pittsburgh Pirates	R	R	July 20, 1994 (age 32)	5
Anthony Banda	New York Mets; Pittsburgh Pirates	L	L	August 10, 1993 (age 33)	5
Anthony Bass	Miami Marlins	R	R	November 1, 1987 (age 38)	10
Anthony Bemboom	Los Angeles Angels	L	R	January 18, 1990 (age 36)	3
Anthony Bender	Miami Marlins	R	R	February 3, 1995 (age 31)	1
Anthony DeSclafani	San Francisco Giants	R	R	April 18, 1990 (age 36)	7
Anthony Gose	Cleveland Indians	L	L	August 10, 1990 (age 36)	6
Anthony Kay	Toronto Blue Jays	L	L	March 21, 1995 (age 31)	3
Anthony Misiewicz	Seattle Mariners	R	L	November 1, 1994 (age 31)	2
Anthony Rendon	Los Angeles Angels	R	R	June 6, 1990 (age 36)	9
Anthony Rizzo	New York Yankees	L	L	August 8, 1989 (age 37)	11
Anthony Swarzak	Arizona Diamondbacks; Kansas City Royals	R	R	September 10, 1985 (age 41)	11
Aramis Garcia	Oakland Athletics	R	R	January 12, 1993 (age 33)	3
Archie Bradley	Philadelphia Phillies	R	R	August 10, 1992 (age 34)	7
Art Warren	Cincinnati Reds	R	R	March 23, 1993 (age 33)	2
Asher Wojciechowski	New York Yankees	R	R	December 21, 1988 (age 37)	5
Ashton Goudeau	Cincinnati Reds; Colorado Rockies	R	R	July 23, 1992 (age 34)	2
Austin Adams	San Diego Padres	R	R	May 5, 1991 (age 35)	5
Austin Allen	Oakland Athletics	L	R	January 16, 1994 (age 32)	3
Austin Barnes	Los Angeles Dodgers	R	R	December 28, 1989 (age 36)	7
Austin Davis	Boston Red Sox; Pittsburgh Pirates	L	L	February 3, 1993 (age 33)	4
Austin Dean	St. Louis Cardinals	R	R	October 14, 1993 (age 33)	4
Austin Gomber	Colorado Rockies	L	L	November 23, 1993 (age 32)	3
Austin Hays	Baltimore Orioles	R	R	July 5, 1995 (age 31)	4
Austin Hedges	Cleveland Indians	R	R	August 18, 1992 (age 34)	7
Austin Meadows	Tampa Bay Rays	L	L	May 3, 1995 (age 31)	4
Austin Nola	San Diego Padres	R	R	December 28, 1989 (age 36)	3
Austin Pruitt	Houston Astros; Miami Marlins	R	R	August 31, 1989 (age 37)	4
Austin Riley	Atlanta Braves	R	R	April 2, 1997 (age 29)	3
Austin Romine	Chicago Cubs	R	R	November 22, 1988 (age 37)	10
Austin Slater	San Francisco Giants	R	R	December 13, 1992 (age 33)	5
Austin Voth	Washington Nationals	R	R	June 26, 1992 (age 34)	4
Austin Warren	Los Angeles Angels	R	R	February 5, 1996 (age 30)	1
Austin Wynns	Baltimore Orioles	R	R	December 10, 1990 (age 35)	3
Bailey Falter	Philadelphia Phillies	R	L	April 24, 1997 (age 29)	1
Bailey Ober	Minnesota Twins	R	R	July 12, 1995 (age 31)	1
Beau Burrows	Detroit Tigers; Minnesota Twins	R	R	September 18, 1996 (age 30)	2
Ben Bowden	Colorado Rockies	L	L	October 21, 1994 (age 32)	1
Ben Gamel	Cleveland Indians; Pittsburgh Pirates	L	L	May 17, 1992 (age 34)	6
Ben Rortvedt	Minnesota Twins	L	R	September 25, 1997 (age 29)	1
Ben Rowen	Los Angeles Angels	R	R	November 15, 1988 (age 37)	3
Bernardo Flores Jr.	St. Louis Cardinals	L	L	August 23, 1995 (age 31)	2
Billy Hamilton	Chicago White Sox	B	R	September 9, 1990 (age 36)	9
Billy McKinney	Los Angeles Dodgers; Milwaukee Brewers; New York Mets	L	L	August 23, 1994 (age 32)	4
Blaine Hardy	Milwaukee Brewers	L	L	March 14, 1987 (age 39)	7
Blake Parker	Cleveland Indians	R	R	June 19, 1985 (age 41)	9
Blake Snell	San Diego Padres	L	L	December 4, 1992 (age 33)	6
Blake Taylor	Houston Astros	L	L	August 17, 1995 (age 31)	2
Blake Treinen	Los Angeles Dodgers	R	R	June 30, 1988 (age 38)	8
Bo Bichette	Toronto Blue Jays	R	R	March 5, 1998 (age 28)	3
Bobby Bradley	Cleveland Indians	L	R	May 29, 1996 (age 30)	2
Bobby Dalbec	Boston Red Sox	R	R	June 29, 1995 (age 31)	2
Brad Boxberger	Milwaukee Brewers	R	R	May 27, 1988 (age 38)	10
Brad Brach	Cincinnati Reds	R	R	April 12, 1986 (age 40)	11
Brad Hand	New York Mets; Toronto Blue Jays; Washington Nationals	L	L	March 20, 1990 (age 36)	11
Brad Keller	Kansas City Royals	R	R	July 27, 1995 (age 31)	4
Brad Miller	Texas Rangers	L	R	October 18, 1989 (age 37)	9
Brad Peacock	Boston Red Sox	R	R	February 2, 1988 (age 38)	10
Brad Wieck	Chicago Cubs	L	L	October 14, 1991 (age 35)	4
Braden Bishop	Seattle Mariners	R	R	August 22, 1993 (age 33)	3
Bradley Zimmer	Cleveland Indians	L	R	November 27, 1992 (age 33)	5
Brady Lail	Seattle Mariners	R	R	August 9, 1993 (age 33)	3
Brady Singer	Kansas City Royals	R	R	August 4, 1996 (age 30)	2
Brandon Belt	San Francisco Giants	L	L	April 20, 1988 (age 38)	11
Brandon Bielak	Houston Astros	L	R	April 2, 1996 (age 30)	2
Brandon Brennan	Boston Red Sox	R	R	July 26, 1991 (age 35)	3
Brandon Crawford	San Francisco Giants	L	R	January 21, 1987 (age 39)	11
Brandon Dickson	St. Louis Cardinals	R	R	November 3, 1984 (age 41)	3
Brandon Drury	New York Mets	R	R	August 21, 1992 (age 34)	7
Brandon Kintzler	Philadelphia Phillies	R	R	August 1, 1984 (age 42)	12
Brandon Lowe	Tampa Bay Rays	L	R	July 6, 1994 (age 32)	4
Brandon Marsh	Philadelphia Phillies	L	R	December 18, 1997 (age 28)	1
Brandon Nimmo	New York Mets	L	R	March 27, 1993 (age 33)	6
Brandon Waddell	Baltimore Orioles; Minnesota Twins; St. Louis Cardinals	L	L	June 3, 1994 (age 32)	2
Brandon Woodruff	Milwaukee Brewers	L	R	February 10, 1993 (age 33)	5
Brandon Workman	Boston Red Sox; Chicago Cubs	R	R	August 13, 1988 (age 38)	7
Brandyn Sittinger	Arizona Diamondbacks	R	R	June 6, 1994 (age 32)	1
Braxton Garrett	Miami Marlins	R	L	August 5, 1997 (age 29)	2
Brendan Rodgers	Colorado Rockies	R	R	August 9, 1996 (age 30)	3
Brent Honeywell Jr.	Tampa Bay Rays	R	R	March 31, 1995 (age 31)	1
Brent Rooker	Minnesota Twins	R	R	November 1, 1994 (age 31)	2
Brent Suter	Milwaukee Brewers	L	L	August 29, 1989 (age 37)	6
Brett Anderson	Milwaukee Brewers	L	L	February 1, 1988 (age 38)	13
Brett de Geus	Arizona Diamondbacks; Texas Rangers	R	R	November 4, 1997 (age 28)	1
Brett Gardner	New York Yankees	L	L	August 24, 1983 (age 43)	14
Brett Martin	Texas Rangers	L	L	April 28, 1995 (age 31)	3
Brett Phillips	Tampa Bay Rays	L	R	May 30, 1994 (age 32)	5
Brian Anderson	Miami Marlins	R	R	May 19, 1993 (age 33)	5
Brian Goodwin	Chicago White Sox	L	R	November 2, 1990 (age 35)	6
Brian Miller	Miami Marlins	L	R	August 20, 1995 (age 31)	1
Brian O'Grady	San Diego Padres	L	R	May 17, 1992 (age 34)	3
Brock Holt	Texas Rangers	L	R	June 11, 1988 (age 38)	10
Brody Koerner	New York Yankees	R	R	October 17, 1993 (age 33)	1
Brooks Kriske	Baltimore Orioles; New York Yankees	R	R	February 3, 1994 (age 32)	2
Brooks Raley	Tampa Bay Rays	L	L	June 29, 1988 (age 38)	4
Bruce Zimmermann	Baltimore Orioles	L	L	February 9, 1995 (age 31)	2
Bryan Baker	Toronto Blue Jays	R	R	December 2, 1994 (age 31)	1
Bryan Garcia	Detroit Tigers	R	R	April 19, 1995 (age 31)	3
Bryan Holaday	Arizona Diamondbacks	R	R	November 19, 1987 (age 38)	10
Bryan Mitchell	Miami Marlins	L	R	April 19, 1991 (age 35)	6
Bryan Reynolds	Pittsburgh Pirates	B	R	January 27, 1995 (age 31)	3
Bryan Shaw	Cleveland Indians	B	R	November 8, 1987 (age 38)	11
Bryce Harper	Philadelphia Phillies	L	R	October 16, 1992 (age 34)	10
Bryse Wilson	Pittsburgh Pirates	R	R	December 20, 1997 (age 28)	4
Buck Farmer	Cincinnati Reds	L	R	February 20, 1991 (age 35)	8
Burch Smith	Oakland Athletics	R	R	April 12, 1990 (age 36)	5
Byron Buxton	Minnesota Twins	R	R	December 18, 1993 (age 32)	7
C. J. Cron	Colorado Rockies	R	R	January 5, 1990 (age 36)	8
Cal Raleigh	Seattle Mariners	B	R	November 26, 1996 (age 29)	1
Caleb Baragar	San Francisco Giants	R	L	April 9, 1994 (age 32)	2
Caleb Smith	Arizona Diamondbacks	R	L	July 28, 1991 (age 35)	5
Caleb Thielbar	Minnesota Twins	R	L	January 31, 1987 (age 39)	5
Cam Bedrosian	Cincinnati Reds; Oakland Athletics; Philadelphia Phillies	R	R	October 2, 1991 (age 35)	8
Cam Gallagher	Kansas City Royals	R	R	December 6, 1992 (age 33)	5
Carl Edwards Jr.	Atlanta Braves; Toronto Blue Jays	R	R	September 3, 1991 (age 35)	7
Carlos Rodon	Chicago White Sox	L	L	December 10, 1992 (age 33)	7
Carson Fulmer	Cincinnati Reds	R	R	December 13, 1993 (age 32)	6
Carson Kelly	Arizona Diamondbacks	R	R	July 14, 1994 (age 32)	6
Carter Kieboom	Washington Nationals	R	R	September 3, 1997 (age 29)	3
Casey Mize	Detroit Tigers	R	R	May 1, 1997 (age 29)	2
Casey Sadler	Seattle Mariners	R	R	July 13, 1990 (age 36)	6
Cavan Biggio	Toronto Blue Jays	L	R	April 11, 1995 (age 31)	3
Cedric Mullins	Baltimore Orioles	L	L	October 1, 1994 (age 32)	4
Chad Green	New York Yankees	L	R	May 24, 1991 (age 35)	6
Chad Kuhl	Pittsburgh Pirates	R	R	September 10, 1992 (age 34)	5
Chad Pinder	Oakland Athletics	R	R	March 29, 1992 (age 34)	6
Chad Wallach	Miami Marlins	R	R	November 4, 1991 (age 34)	5
Chance Sisco	Baltimore Orioles; New York Mets	L	R	February 24, 1995 (age 31)	5
Charlie Barnes	Minnesota Twins	L	L	October 1, 1995 (age 31)	1
Charlie Blackmon	Colorado Rockies	L	L	July 1, 1986 (age 40)	11
Charlie Culberson	Texas Rangers	R	R	April 10, 1989 (age 37)	9
Charlie Morton	Atlanta Braves	R	R	November 12, 1983 (age 42)	14
Chas McCormick	Houston Astros	R	L	April 19, 1995 (age 31)	1
Chase Anderson	Philadelphia Phillies	R	R	November 30, 1987 (age 38)	8
Chase De Jong	Pittsburgh Pirates	L	R	December 29, 1993 (age 32)	5
Chasen Shreve	Pittsburgh Pirates	L	L	July 12, 1990 (age 36)	8
Chaz Roe	Tampa Bay Rays	R	R	October 9, 1986 (age 40)	9
Chi Chi Gonzalez	Colorado Rockies	R	R	January 15, 1992 (age 34)	5
Chris Archer	Tampa Bay Rays	R	R	September 26, 1988 (age 38)	9
Chris Bassitt	New York Mets	R	R	February 22, 1989 (age 37)	7
Chris Devenski	Arizona Diamondbacks	R	R	November 13, 1990 (age 35)	6
Chris Ellis	Baltimore Orioles; Tampa Bay Rays	L	R	September 22, 1992 (age 34)	2
Chris Flexen	Seattle Mariners	R	R	July 1, 1994 (age 32)	4
Chris Gittens	New York Yankees	R	R	February 4, 1994 (age 32)	1
Chris Martin	Chicago Cubs	R	R	June 2, 1986 (age 40)	6
Chris Mazza	Tampa Bay Rays	R	R	October 17, 1989 (age 37)	3
Chris Owings	Colorado Rockies	R	R	August 12, 1991 (age 35)	9
Chris Paddack	San Diego Padres	R	R	January 8, 1996 (age 30)	3
Chris Rodriguez	Los Angeles Angels	R	R	July 20, 1998 (age 28)	1
Chris Sale	Boston Red Sox	L	L	March 30, 1989 (age 37)	11
Chris Stratton	Pittsburgh Pirates	R	R	August 22, 1990 (age 36)	6
Chris Taylor	Los Angeles Dodgers	R	R	August 29, 1990 (age 36)	8
Christian Arroyo	Boston Red Sox	R	R	May 30, 1995 (age 31)	5
Christian Walker	Arizona Diamondbacks	R	R	March 28, 1991 (age 35)	7
Christian Yelich	Milwaukee Brewers	L	R	December 5, 1991 (age 34)	9
Clarke Schmidt	New York Yankees	R	R	February 20, 1996 (age 30)	2
Clay Holmes	New York Yankees; Pittsburgh Pirates	R	R	March 27, 1993 (age 33)	4
Clayton Kershaw	Los Angeles Dodgers	L	L	March 19, 1988 (age 38)	14
Clint Frazier	New York Yankees	R	R	September 6, 1994 (age 32)	5
Codi Heuer	Chicago Cubs; Chicago White Sox	R	R	July 3, 1996 (age 30)	2
Cody Bellinger	Los Angeles Dodgers	L	L	July 13, 1995 (age 31)	5
Cody Ponce	Pittsburgh Pirates	R	R	April 25, 1994 (age 32)	2
Cody Poteet	Miami Marlins	R	R	July 30, 1994 (age 32)	1
Cody Reed	Tampa Bay Rays	L	L	April 15, 1993 (age 33)	6
Cody Stashak	Minnesota Twins	R	R	June 4, 1994 (age 32)	3
Cody Wilson	Washington Nationals	R	R	July 4, 1996 (age 30)	1
Cole Irvin	Oakland Athletics	L	L	January 31, 1994 (age 32)	3
Cole Sulser	Baltimore Orioles	R	R	March 12, 1990 (age 36)	3
Cole Tucker	Pittsburgh Pirates	B	R	July 3, 1996 (age 30)	3
Colin Moran	Pittsburgh Pirates	L	R	October 1, 1992 (age 34)	6
Colin Rea	Milwaukee Brewers	R	R	July 1, 1990 (age 36)	4
Collin McHugh	Atlanta Braves	R	R	June 19, 1987 (age 39)	9
Colten Brewer	Boston Red Sox	R	R	October 29, 1992 (age 33)	4
Colton Welker	Colorado Rockies	R	R	October 9, 1997 (age 29)	1
Conner Greene	Baltimore Orioles; Los Angeles Dodgers	R	R	April 4, 1995 (age 31)	1
Conner Menez	San Francisco Giants	L	L	May 29, 1995 (age 31)	3
Connor Brogdon	Philadelphia Phillies	R	R	January 29, 1995 (age 31)	2
Connor Joe	Colorado Rockies	R	R	August 16, 1992 (age 34)	2
Connor Overton	Pittsburgh Pirates; Toronto Blue Jays	L	R	July 24, 1993 (age 33)	1
Connor Seabold	Boston Red Sox	R	R	January 24, 1996 (age 30)	1
Connor Wong	Boston Red Sox	R	R	May 19, 1996 (age 30)	1
Cooper Criswell	Los Angeles Angels	R	R	July 24, 1996 (age 30)	1
Corbin Burnes	Milwaukee Brewers	R	R	October 22, 1994 (age 32)	4
Corbin Martin	Arizona Diamondbacks	R	R	December 28, 1995 (age 30)	2
Corey Dickerson	Miami Marlins; Toronto Blue Jays	L	R	May 22, 1989 (age 37)	9
Corey Kluber	New York Yankees	R	R	April 10, 1986 (age 40)	11
Corey Knebel	Los Angeles Dodgers	R	R	November 26, 1991 (age 34)	7
Corey Oswalt	New York Mets	R	R	September 3, 1993 (age 33)	4
Corey Ray	Milwaukee Brewers	L	L	September 22, 1994 (age 32)	1
Corey Seager	Texas Rangers	L	R	April 27, 1994 (age 32)	7
Cory Abbott	Chicago Cubs	R	R	September 20, 1995 (age 31)	1
Craig Kimbrel	Los Angeles Dodgers	R	R	May 28, 1988 (age 38)	12
Craig Stammen	San Diego Padres	R	R	March 9, 1984 (age 42)	12
Curt Casali	San Francisco Giants	R	R	November 9, 1988 (age 37)	8
Curtis Terry	Texas Rangers	R	R	October 6, 1996 (age 30)	1
Dakota Hudson	St. Louis Cardinals	R	R	September 15, 1994 (age 32)	4
Dallas Keuchel	Chicago White Sox	L	L	January 1, 1988 (age 38)	10
Damon Jones	Philadelphia Phillies	L	L	September 30, 1994 (age 32)	1
Dan Altavilla	San Diego Padres	R	R	September 8, 1992 (age 34)	6
Dan Winkler	Chicago Cubs	R	R	February 2, 1990 (age 36)	7
Dane Dunning	Texas Rangers	R	R	December 20, 1994 (age 31)	2
Daniel Bard	Colorado Rockies	R	R	June 25, 1985 (age 41)	7
Daniel Camarena	San Diego Padres	L	L	November 9, 1992 (age 33)	1
Daniel Castano	Miami Marlins	L	L	September 17, 1994 (age 32)	2
Daniel Hudson	San Diego Padres; Washington Nationals	R	R	March 9, 1987 (age 39)	12
Daniel Johnson	Cleveland Indians	L	L	July 11, 1995 (age 31)	2
Daniel Lynch	Kansas City Royals	L	L	November 17, 1996 (age 29)	1
Daniel Norris	Detroit Tigers; Milwaukee Brewers	L	L	April 25, 1993 (age 33)	8
Daniel Ponce de Leon	St. Louis Cardinals	R	R	January 16, 1992 (age 34)	4
Daniel Robertson	Milwaukee Brewers	R	R	March 22, 1994 (age 32)	5
Daniel Vogelbach	Pittsburgh Pirates	L	R	December 17, 1992 (age 33)	6
Daniel Zamora	Seattle Mariners	L	L	April 15, 1993 (age 33)	3
Danny Coulombe	Minnesota Twins	L	L	October 26, 1989 (age 36)	7
Danny Duffy	Kansas City Royals	L	L	December 21, 1988 (age 37)	11
Danny Jansen	Toronto Blue Jays	R	R	April 15, 1995 (age 31)	4
Danny Mendick	Chicago White Sox	R	R	September 28, 1993 (age 33)	3
Dansby Swanson	Atlanta Braves	R	R	February 11, 1994 (age 32)	6
Darin Ruf	San Francisco Giants	R	R	July 28, 1986 (age 40)	7
Darren McCaughan	Seattle Mariners	R	R	March 18, 1996 (age 30)	1
Daulton Jefferies	Oakland Athletics	L	R	August 2, 1995 (age 31)	2
Daulton Varsho	Arizona Diamondbacks	L	R	July 2, 1996 (age 30)	2
David Bednar	Pittsburgh Pirates	L	R	October 10, 1994 (age 32)	3
David Bote	Chicago Cubs	R	R	April 7, 1993 (age 33)	4
David Dahl	Texas Rangers	L	R	April 1, 1994 (age 32)	5
David Fletcher	Los Angeles Angels	R	R	May 31, 1994 (age 32)	4
David Hale	Philadelphia Phillies	R	R	September 27, 1987 (age 39)	8
David Hess	Miami Marlins; Tampa Bay Rays	R	R	July 10, 1993 (age 33)	4
David Peterson	New York Mets	L	L	September 3, 1995 (age 31)	2
David Phelps	Toronto Blue Jays	R	R	October 9, 1986 (age 40)	9
David Price	Los Angeles Dodgers	L	L	August 26, 1985 (age 41)	13
David Robertson	Tampa Bay Rays	R	R	April 9, 1985 (age 41)	13
Daz Cameron	Detroit Tigers	R	R	January 15, 1997 (age 29)	2
Dean Kremer	Baltimore Orioles	R	R	January 7, 1996 (age 30)	2
Delino DeShields	Cincinnati Reds	R	R	August 16, 1992 (age 34)	7
Dellin Betances	New York Mets	R	R	March 23, 1988 (age 38)	10
Demarcus Evans	Texas Rangers	R	R	October 22, 1996 (age 30)	2
Derek Fisher	Milwaukee Brewers	L	R	August 21, 1993 (age 33)	5
Derek Hill	Detroit Tigers	R	R	December 30, 1995 (age 30)	2
Derek Holland	Detroit Tigers	B	L	October 9, 1986 (age 40)	13
Derek Law	Minnesota Twins	R	R	September 14, 1990 (age 36)	5
Deven Marrero	Miami Marlins	R	R	August 25, 1990 (age 36)	6
Devin Smeltzer	Minnesota Twins	R	L	September 7, 1995 (age 31)	3
Devin Williams	Milwaukee Brewers	R	R	September 21, 1994 (age 32)	3
Dexter Fowler	Los Angeles Angels	B	R	March 22, 1986 (age 40)	14
Dietrich Enns	Tampa Bay Rays	L	L	May 16, 1991 (age 35)	2
Dillon Maples	Chicago Cubs	R	R	May 9, 1992 (age 34)	5
Dillon Peters	Pittsburgh Pirates	L	L	August 31, 1992 (age 34)	5
Dillon Tate	Baltimore Orioles	R	R	May 1, 1994 (age 32)	3
Dillon Thomas	Seattle Mariners	L	L	December 10, 1992 (age 33)	1
DJ Johnson	Cleveland Indians; Tampa Bay Rays	L	R	August 30, 1989 (age 37)	3
DJ LeMahieu	New York Yankees	R	R	July 13, 1988 (age 38)	11
DJ Peters	Los Angeles Dodgers; Texas Rangers	R	R	December 12, 1995 (age 30)	1
DJ Stewart	Baltimore Orioles	L	R	November 30, 1993 (age 32)	4
Dom Nunez	Colorado Rockies	L	R	January 17, 1995 (age 31)	2
Dominic Leone	San Francisco Giants	R	R	October 26, 1991 (age 34)	8
Dominic Smith	New York Mets	L	L	June 15, 1995 (age 31)	5
Donovan Walton	Seattle Mariners	L	R	May 25, 1994 (age 32)	3
Drew Anderson	Texas Rangers	R	R	March 22, 1994 (age 32)	5
Drew Butera	Los Angeles Angels	R	R	August 9, 1983 (age 43)	12
Drew Carlton	Detroit Tigers	R	R	September 8, 1995 (age 31)	1
Drew Ellis	Arizona Diamondbacks	R	R	December 1, 1995 (age 30)	1
Drew Hutchison	Detroit Tigers	L	R	August 22, 1990 (age 36)	6
Drew Pomeranz	San Diego Padres	R	L	November 22, 1988 (age 37)	11
Drew Rasmussen	Milwaukee Brewers; Tampa Bay Rays	R	R	July 27, 1995 (age 31)	2
Drew Smith	New York Mets	R	R	September 24, 1993 (age 33)	3
Drew Smyly	Chicago Cubs	L	L	June 13, 1989 (age 37)	8
Drew Steckenrider	Seattle Mariners	R	R	January 10, 1991 (age 35)	4
Duane Underwood Jr.	Pittsburgh Pirates	R	R	July 20, 1994 (age 32)	4
Dusten Knight	Baltimore Orioles	R	R	September 7, 1990 (age 36)	1
Dustin Fowler	Pittsburgh Pirates	L	L	December 29, 1994 (age 31)	3
Dustin Garneau	Detroit Tigers	R	R	August 13, 1987 (age 39)	7
Dustin May	Los Angeles Dodgers	R	R	September 6, 1997 (age 29)	3
Dylan Bundy	Los Angeles Angels	B	R	November 15, 1992 (age 33)	7
Dylan Carlson	St. Louis Cardinals	B	L	October 23, 1998 (age 28)	2
Dylan Cease	Chicago White Sox	R	R	December 28, 1995 (age 30)	3
Dylan Coleman	Kansas City Royals	R	R	September 16, 1996 (age 30)	1
Dylan Floro	Miami Marlins	L	R	December 27, 1990 (age 35)	6
Dylan Lee	Atlanta Braves	L	L	August 1, 1994 (age 32)	1
Dylan Moore	Seattle Mariners	R	R	August 2, 1992 (age 34)	3
Eddy Alvarez	Miami Marlins	B	R	January 30, 1990 (age 36)	2
Eli Morgan	Cleveland Indians	R	R	May 13, 1996 (age 30)	1
Eli White	Texas Rangers	R	R	June 26, 1994 (age 32)	2
Emilio Pagan	San Diego Padres	L	R	May 7, 1991 (age 35)	5
Eric Campbell	Seattle Mariners	R	R	April 9, 1987 (age 39)	4
Eric Haase	Detroit Tigers	R	R	December 18, 1992 (age 33)	4
Eric Hanhold	Baltimore Orioles	R	R	November 1, 1993 (age 32)	2
Eric Hosmer	San Diego Padres	L	L	October 24, 1989 (age 37)	11
Eric Lauer	Milwaukee Brewers	R	L	June 3, 1995 (age 31)	4
Eric Sogard	Chicago Cubs	L	R	May 22, 1986 (age 40)	11
Eric Yardley	Milwaukee Brewers	R	R	August 18, 1990 (age 36)	3
Erick Fedde	Washington Nationals	R	R	February 25, 1993 (age 33)	5
Erik Swanson	Seattle Mariners	R	R	September 4, 1993 (age 33)	3
Ernie Clement	Cleveland Indians	R	R	March 22, 1996 (age 30)	1
Evan Longoria	San Francisco Giants	R	R	October 7, 1985 (age 41)	14
Evan Marshall	Chicago White Sox	R	R	April 18, 1990 (age 36)	8
Evan Phillips	Los Angeles Dodgers; Tampa Bay Rays	R	R	September 11, 1994 (age 32)	4
Evan White	Seattle Mariners	R	L	April 26, 1996 (age 30)	2
Frank Schwindel	Chicago Cubs; Oakland Athletics	R	R	June 29, 1992 (age 34)	2
Freddie Freeman	Los Angeles Dodgers	L	R	September 12, 1989 (age 37)	12
Gabe Klobosits	Washington Nationals	L	R	May 16, 1995 (age 31)	1
Gabe Speier	Kansas City Royals	L	L	April 12, 1995 (age 31)	3
Garrett Cleavinger	Los Angeles Dodgers	R	L	April 23, 1994 (age 32)	2
Garrett Cooper	Miami Marlins	R	R	December 25, 1990 (age 35)	5
Garrett Crochet	Chicago White Sox	L	L	June 21, 1999 (age 27)	2
Garrett Hampson	Colorado Rockies	R	R	October 10, 1994 (age 32)	4
Garrett Richards	Boston Red Sox	R	R	May 27, 1988 (age 38)	11
Garrett Stubbs	Houston Astros	L	R	May 26, 1993 (age 33)	3
Garrett Whitlock	Boston Red Sox	R	R	June 11, 1996 (age 30)	1
Gavin Lux	Los Angeles Dodgers	L	R	November 23, 1997 (age 28)	3
Gavin Sheets	Chicago White Sox	L	L	April 23, 1996 (age 30)	1
Geoff Hartlieb	New York Mets; Pittsburgh Pirates	R	R	December 9, 1993 (age 32)	3
George Springer	Toronto Blue Jays	R	R	September 19, 1989 (age 37)	8
Gerrit Cole	New York Yankees	R	R	September 8, 1990 (age 36)	9
Giancarlo Stanton	New York Yankees	R	R	November 8, 1989 (age 36)	12
Glenn Otto	Texas Rangers	R	R	March 11, 1996 (age 30)	1
Grant Dayton	Atlanta Braves	L	L	November 25, 1987 (age 38)	5
Grayson Greiner	Detroit Tigers	R	R	October 11, 1992 (age 34)	4
Greg Allen	New York Yankees	B	R	March 15, 1993 (age 33)	5
Greg Deichmann	Chicago Cubs	L	R	May 31, 1995 (age 31)	1
Greg Holland	Kansas City Royals	R	R	November 20, 1985 (age 40)	11
Griffin Canning	Los Angeles Angels	R	R	May 11, 1996 (age 30)	3
Griffin Jax	Minnesota Twins	R	R	November 22, 1994 (age 31)	1
Hans Crouse	Philadelphia Phillies	L	R	September 15, 1998 (age 28)	1
Harrison Bader	St. Louis Cardinals	R	R	June 3, 1994 (age 32)	5
Heath Hembree	Cincinnati Reds; New York Mets	R	R	January 13, 1989 (age 37)	9
Hector Santiago	Seattle Mariners	R	L	December 16, 1987 (age 38)	10
Hoby Milner	Milwaukee Brewers	L	L	January 13, 1991 (age 35)	5
Hunter Dozier	Kansas City Royals	R	R	August 22, 1991 (age 35)	5
Hunter Harvey	Baltimore Orioles	R	R	December 9, 1994 (age 31)	3
Hunter Owen	Pittsburgh Pirates	R	R	September 22, 1993 (age 33)	1
Hunter Renfroe	Boston Red Sox	R	R	January 28, 1992 (age 34)	6
Hunter Strickland	Los Angeles Angels; Milwaukee Brewers; Tampa Bay Rays	R	R	September 24, 1988 (age 38)	8
Hunter Wood	Texas Rangers	R	R	August 12, 1993 (age 33)	4
Ian Anderson	Atlanta Braves	R	R	May 2, 1998 (age 28)	2
Ian Gibaut	Minnesota Twins	R	R	November 19, 1993 (age 32)	3
Ian Happ	Chicago Cubs	B	R	August 12, 1994 (age 32)	5
Ian Kennedy	Philadelphia Phillies; Texas Rangers	R	R	December 19, 1984 (age 41)	15
Ian Krol	Detroit Tigers	L	L	May 9, 1991 (age 35)	7
Isaac Mattson	Baltimore Orioles	R	R	July 14, 1995 (age 31)	1
Isiah Kiner-Falefa	New York Yankees	R	R	March 23, 1995 (age 31)	4
J.B. Bukauskas	Arizona Diamondbacks	R	R	October 11, 1996 (age 30)	1
J. B. Wendelken	Arizona Diamondbacks; Oakland Athletics	R	R	March 24, 1993 (age 33)	5
J. D. Davis	New York Mets	R	R	April 27, 1993 (age 33)	5
J. D. Hammer	Philadelphia Phillies	R	R	July 12, 1994 (age 32)	2
J. D. Martinez	Boston Red Sox	R	R	August 21, 1987 (age 39)	11
J. P. Crawford	Seattle Mariners	L	R	January 11, 1995 (age 31)	5
J. P. Feyereisen	Milwaukee Brewers; Tampa Bay Rays	R	R	February 7, 1993 (age 33)	2
J. T. Realmuto	Philadelphia Phillies	R	R	March 18, 1991 (age 35)	8
Jace Fry	Chicago White Sox	L	L	July 9, 1993 (age 33)	5
Jace Peterson	Milwaukee Brewers	L	R	May 9, 1990 (age 36)	8
Jack Flaherty	St. Louis Cardinals	R	R	October 15, 1995 (age 31)	5
Jack Kruger	Los Angeles Angels	R	R	October 26, 1994 (age 31)	1
Jack Mayfield	Los Angeles Angels; Seattle Mariners	R	R	September 30, 1990 (age 36)	3
Jackie Bradley Jr.	Milwaukee Brewers	L	R	April 19, 1990 (age 36)	9
Jackson Kowar	Kansas City Royals	R	R	October 4, 1996 (age 30)	1
Jacob Barnes	New York Mets; Toronto Blue Jays	R	R	April 14, 1990 (age 36)	6
Jacob deGrom	New York Mets	L	R	June 19, 1988 (age 38)	8
Jacob Nottingham	Milwaukee Brewers; Seattle Mariners	R	R	April 3, 1995 (age 31)	4
Jacob Stallings	Miami Marlins	R	R	December 22, 1989 (age 36)	6
Jacob Webb	Atlanta Braves	R	R	August 15, 1993 (age 33)	3
Jacob Wilson	Houston Astros; Oakland Athletics	R	R	July 29, 1990 (age 36)	1
JaCoby Jones	Detroit Tigers	R	R	May 10, 1992 (age 34)	6
Jahmai Jones	Baltimore Orioles	R	R	August 4, 1997 (age 29)	2
Jake Arrieta	Chicago Cubs; San Diego Padres	R	R	March 6, 1986 (age 40)	12
Jake Bauers	Cleveland Indians; Seattle Mariners	L	L	October 6, 1995 (age 31)	3
Jake Brentz	Kansas City Royals	L	L	September 14, 1994 (age 32)	1
Jake Burger	Chicago White Sox	R	R	April 10, 1996 (age 30)	1
Jake Cave	Minnesota Twins	L	L	December 4, 1992 (age 33)	4
Jake Cousins	Milwaukee Brewers	R	R	July 14, 1994 (age 32)	1
Jake Cronenworth	San Diego Padres	L	R	January 21, 1994 (age 32)	2
Jake Diekman	Oakland Athletics	R	L	January 21, 1987 (age 39)	10
Jake Faria	Arizona Diamondbacks	R	R	July 30, 1993 (age 33)	4
Jake Fraley	Seattle Mariners	L	L	May 25, 1995 (age 31)	3
Jake Hager	Arizona Diamondbacks; New York Mets	R	R	March 4, 1993 (age 33)	1
Jake Jewell	Chicago Cubs	R	R	May 16, 1993 (age 33)	3
Jake Lamb	Chicago White Sox; Toronto Blue Jays	L	R	October 9, 1990 (age 36)	8
Jake Latz	Texas Rangers	R	L	April 8, 1996 (age 30)	1
Jake Marisnick	Chicago Cubs; San Diego Padres	R	R	March 30, 1991 (age 35)	9
Jake McCarthy	Arizona Diamondbacks	L	L	July 30, 1997 (age 29)	1
Jake McGee	San Francisco Giants	L	L	August 6, 1986 (age 40)	12
Jake Meyers	Houston Astros	R	L	June 18, 1996 (age 30)	1
Jake Newberry	Kansas City Royals	R	R	November 20, 1994 (age 31)	4
Jake Odorizzi	Houston Astros	R	R	March 27, 1990 (age 36)	10
Jake Petricka	Los Angeles Angels	R	R	June 5, 1988 (age 38)	8
Jake Reed	Los Angeles Dodgers; New York Mets	R	R	September 29, 1992 (age 34)	1
Jake Rogers	Detroit Tigers	R	R	April 18, 1995 (age 31)	2
Jake Woodford	St. Louis Cardinals	R	R	October 28, 1996 (age 29)	2
Jakob Junis	Kansas City Royals	R	R	September 16, 1992 (age 34)	5
Jakson Reetz	Washington Nationals	R	R	January 3, 1996 (age 30)	1
James Hoyt	Los Angeles Angels	R	R	September 30, 1986 (age 40)	6
James Kaprielian	Oakland Athletics	R	R	March 2, 1994 (age 32)	2
James Karinchak	Cleveland Indians	R	R	September 22, 1995 (age 31)	3
James McCann	New York Mets	R	R	June 13, 1990 (age 36)	8
James Norwood	San Diego Padres	R	R	December 24, 1993 (age 32)	4
James Sherfy	Los Angeles Dodgers; San Francisco Giants	R	R	December 27, 1991 (age 34)	4
Jameson Taillon	New York Yankees	R	R	November 18, 1991 (age 34)	5
Janson Junk	Los Angeles Angels	R	R	January 15, 1996 (age 30)	1
Jared Hoying	Toronto Blue Jays	L	R	May 18, 1989 (age 37)	3
Jared Oliva	Pittsburgh Pirates	R	R	November 27, 1995 (age 30)	2
Jared Walsh	Los Angeles Angels	L	L	July 30, 1993 (age 33)	3
Jarred Kelenic	Seattle Mariners	L	L	July 16, 1999 (age 27)	1
Jarren Duran	Boston Red Sox	L	R	September 5, 1996 (age 30)	1
Jarrod Dyson	Kansas City Royals; Toronto Blue Jays	L	R	August 15, 1984 (age 42)	12
Jason Adam	Chicago Cubs	R	R	August 4, 1991 (age 35)	4
Jason Castro	Houston Astros	L	R	June 18, 1987 (age 39)	11
Jason Foley	Detroit Tigers	R	R	November 1, 1995 (age 30)	1
Jason Heyward	Chicago Cubs	L	L	August 9, 1989 (age 37)	12
Jason Martin	Texas Rangers	L	R	September 5, 1995 (age 31)	3
Jason Vosler	San Francisco Giants	L	R	September 6, 1993 (age 33)	1
Javy Guerra	Washington Nationals	R	R	October 31, 1985 (age 40)	11
Jay Bruce	New York Yankees	L	L	April 3, 1987 (age 39)	14
Jay Flaa	Atlanta Braves; Baltimore Orioles	R	R	June 10, 1992 (age 34)	1
Jay Jackson	San Francisco Giants	R	R	October 27, 1987 (age 38)	3
Jaylin Davis	San Francisco Giants	R	R	July 1, 1994 (age 32)	3
Jed Lowrie	Oakland Athletics	B	R	April 17, 1984 (age 42)	13
Jeff Hoffman	Cincinnati Reds	R	R	January 8, 1993 (age 33)	6
Jeff Mathis	Atlanta Braves	R	R	March 31, 1983 (age 43)	17
Jeff McNeil	New York Mets	L	R	April 8, 1992 (age 34)	4
Jeffrey Springs	Tampa Bay Rays	L	L	September 20, 1992 (age 34)	4
Jeimer Candelario	Detroit Tigers	B	R	November 24, 1993 (age 32)	6
Jerad Eickhoff	New York Mets	R	R	July 2, 1990 (age 36)	6
Jeremy Beasley	Toronto Blue Jays	R	R	November 20, 1995 (age 30)	2
Jesse Biddle	Atlanta Braves	L	L	October 22, 1991 (age 35)	4
Jesse Chavez	Atlanta Braves	R	R	August 21, 1983 (age 43)	14
Jesse Hahn	Kansas City Royals	R	R	July 30, 1989 (age 37)	7
Jesse Winker	Seattle Mariners	L	L	August 17, 1993 (age 33)	5
Jimmy Herget	Los Angeles Angels; Texas Rangers	R	R	September 9, 1993 (age 33)	3
Jimmy Lambert	Chicago White Sox	R	R	November 18, 1994 (age 31)	2
Jimmy Nelson	Los Angeles Dodgers	R	R	June 5, 1989 (age 37)	7
Jo Adell	Los Angeles Angels	R	R	April 8, 1999 (age 27)	2
Joc Pederson	San Francisco Giants	L	L	April 21, 1992 (age 34)	8
Joe Barlow	Texas Rangers	R	R	September 28, 1995 (age 31)	1
Joe Biagini	Chicago Cubs	R	R	May 29, 1990 (age 36)	6
Joe Kelly	Chicago White Sox	R	R	June 9, 1988 (age 38)	10
Joe Mantiply	Arizona Diamondbacks	R	L	March 1, 1991 (age 35)	4
Joe Musgrove	San Diego Padres	R	R	December 4, 1992 (age 33)	6
Joe Panik	Miami Marlins; Toronto Blue Jays	L	R	October 30, 1990 (age 35)	8
Joe Ross	Washington Nationals	R	R	May 21, 1993 (age 33)	6
Joe Ryan	Minnesota Twins	R	R	June 5, 1996 (age 30)	1
Joe Smith	Minnesota Twins	R	R	March 22, 1984 (age 42)	14
Joey Bart	San Francisco Giants	R	R	December 15, 1996 (age 29)	2
Joey Gallo	New York Yankees	L	R	November 19, 1993 (age 32)	7
Joey Krehbiel	Baltimore Orioles; Tampa Bay Rays	R	R	December 20, 1992 (age 33)	2
Joey Lucchesi	New York Mets	L	L	June 6, 1993 (age 33)	4
Joey Wendle	Tampa Bay Rays	L	R	April 26, 1990 (age 36)	6
John Andreoli	San Diego Padres	R	R	June 9, 1990 (age 36)	2
John Brebbia	San Francisco Giants	L	R	May 30, 1990 (age 36)	4
John Curtiss	Miami Marlins; Milwaukee Brewers	R	R	April 5, 1993 (age 33)	5
John Gant	Minnesota Twins; St. Louis Cardinals	R	R	August 6, 1992 (age 34)	6
John Hicks	Texas Rangers	R	R	August 31, 1989 (age 37)	6
John King	Texas Rangers	L	L	September 14, 1994 (age 32)	2
John Means	Baltimore Orioles	L	L	April 24, 1993 (age 33)	4
John Nogowski	Atlanta Braves	R	L	January 5, 1993 (age 33)	2
John Schreiber	Boston Red Sox	R	R	March 5, 1994 (age 32)	3
JoJo Romero	Philadelphia Phillies	L	L	September 9, 1996 (age 30)	2
Jon Berti	Miami Marlins	R	R	January 22, 1990 (age 36)	4
Jon Duplantier	Arizona Diamondbacks	L	R	July 11, 1994 (age 32)	2
Jon Gray	Colorado Rockies	R	R	November 5, 1991 (age 34)	7
Jon Heasley	Kansas City Royals	R	R	January 27, 1997 (age 29)	1
Jon Jay	Los Angeles Angels	L	L	March 15, 1985 (age 41)	12
Jonah Heim	Texas Rangers	B	R	June 27, 1995 (age 31)	2
Jonathan Davis	New York Yankees; Toronto Blue Jays	R	R	May 12, 1992 (age 34)	4
Jonathan India	Cincinnati Reds	R	R	December 15, 1996 (age 29)	1
Jonathan Lucroy	Atlanta Braves; Washington Nationals	R	R	June 13, 1986 (age 40)	12
Jonathan Stiever	Chicago White Sox	R	R	May 12, 1997 (age 29)	2
Jordan Hicks	St. Louis Cardinals	R	R	September 6, 1996 (age 30)	3
Jordan Holloway	Miami Marlins	R	R	June 13, 1996 (age 30)	2
Jordan Luplow	Cleveland Indians; Tampa Bay Rays	R	R	September 26, 1993 (age 33)	5
Jordan Lyles	Texas Rangers	R	R	October 19, 1990 (age 36)	11
Jordan Montgomery	New York Yankees	L	L	December 27, 1992 (age 33)	5
Jordan Sheffield	Colorado Rockies	R	R	June 1, 1995 (age 31)	1
Jordan Weems	Arizona Diamondbacks; Oakland Athletics	L	R	November 7, 1992 (age 33)	2
Jordan Yamamoto	New York Mets	R	R	May 11, 1996 (age 30)	3
Jordy Mercer	Washington Nationals	R	R	August 27, 1986 (age 40)	10
Jose Marmolejos	Seattle Mariners	L	L	January 2, 1993 (age 33)	2
Jose Rojas	Los Angeles Angels	L	R	February 24, 1993 (age 33)	1
Jose Trevino	Texas Rangers	R	R	November 28, 1992 (age 33)	4
Joseph Odom	Tampa Bay Rays	R	R	January 9, 1992 (age 34)	2
Josh Bell	Washington Nationals	B	R	August 14, 1992 (age 34)	6
Josh Donaldson	New York Yankees	R	R	December 8, 1985 (age 40)	11
Josh Fleming	Tampa Bay Rays	R	L	May 18, 1996 (age 30)	2
Josh Hader	Milwaukee Brewers	L	L	April 7, 1994 (age 32)	5
Josh Harrison	Chicago White Sox	R	R	July 8, 1987 (age 39)	11
Josh James	Houston Astros	R	R	March 8, 1993 (age 33)	4
Josh Lindblom	Milwaukee Brewers	R	R	June 15, 1987 (age 39)	7
Josh Lowe	Tampa Bay Rays	L	R	February 2, 1998 (age 28)	1
Josh Osich	Cincinnati Reds	L	L	September 3, 1988 (age 38)	7
Josh Palacios	Toronto Blue Jays	L	R	July 30, 1995 (age 31)	1
Josh Reddick	Arizona Diamondbacks	L	R	February 19, 1987 (age 39)	13
Josh Rogers	Washington Nationals	L	L	July 10, 1994 (age 32)	3
Josh Rojas	Arizona Diamondbacks	L	R	June 30, 1994 (age 32)	3
Josh Sborz	Texas Rangers	R	R	December 17, 1993 (age 32)	3
Josh Staumont	Kansas City Royals	R	R	December 21, 1993 (age 32)	3
Josh Taylor	Boston Red Sox	L	L	March 2, 1993 (age 33)	3
Josh Tomlin	Atlanta Braves	R	R	October 19, 1984 (age 42)	12
Josh VanMeter	Arizona Diamondbacks	L	R	March 10, 1995 (age 31)	3
Joshua Fuentes	Colorado Rockies	R	R	February 19, 1993 (age 33)	3
Josiah Gray	Los Angeles Dodgers; Washington Nationals	R	R	December 21, 1997 (age 28)	1
J. T. Brubaker	Pittsburgh Pirates	R	R	November 17, 1993 (age 32)	2
JT Chargois	Seattle Mariners; Tampa Bay Rays	B	R	December 3, 1990 (age 35)	4
JT Riddle	Minnesota Twins	L	R	October 12, 1991 (age 35)	5
Julian Merryweather	Toronto Blue Jays	R	R	October 14, 1991 (age 35)	2
Justin Bruihl	Los Angeles Dodgers	L	L	June 26, 1997 (age 29)	1
Justin Dunn	Seattle Mariners	R	R	September 22, 1995 (age 31)	3
Justin Garza	Cleveland Indians	R	R	March 20, 1994 (age 32)	1
Justin Miller	St. Louis Cardinals; Washington Nationals	R	R	June 13, 1987 (age 39)	6
Justin Steele	Chicago Cubs	L	L	July 11, 1995 (age 31)	1
Justin Topa	Milwaukee Brewers	R	R	March 7, 1991 (age 35)	2
Justin Turner	Los Angeles Dodgers	R	R	November 23, 1984 (age 41)	13
Justin Upton	Seattle Mariners	R	R	August 25, 1987 (age 39)	15
Justin Williams	St. Louis Cardinals	L	R	August 20, 1995 (age 31)	3
Justin Wilson	Cincinnati Reds; New York Yankees	L	L	August 18, 1987 (age 39)	10
Justus Sheffield	Seattle Mariners	L	L	May 13, 1996 (age 30)	4
Ka'ai Tom	Oakland Athletics; Pittsburgh Pirates	L	R	May 29, 1994 (age 32)	1
Kaleb Ort	Boston Red Sox	R	R	February 5, 1992 (age 34)	1
Kean Wong	Los Angeles Angels	L	R	April 17, 1995 (age 31)	2
Ke'Bryan Hayes	Pittsburgh Pirates	R	R	January 28, 1997 (age 29)	2
Keegan Akin	Baltimore Orioles	L	L	April 1, 1995 (age 31)	2
Keegan Thompson	Chicago Cubs	R	R	March 13, 1995 (age 31)	1
Kendall Graveman	Houston Astros; Seattle Mariners	R	R	December 21, 1990 (age 35)	7
Kent Emanuel	Houston Astros	L	L	June 4, 1992 (age 34)	1
Keone Kela	San Diego Padres	R	R	April 16, 1993 (age 33)	7
Keston Hiura	Milwaukee Brewers	R	R	August 2, 1996 (age 30)	3
Kevan Smith	Atlanta Braves; Tampa Bay Rays	R	R	June 28, 1988 (age 38)	6
Kevin Gausman	Toronto Blue Jays	L	R	January 6, 1991 (age 35)	9
Kevin Ginkel	Arizona Diamondbacks	L	R	March 24, 1994 (age 32)	3
Kevin Kiermaier	Tampa Bay Rays	L	R	April 22, 1990 (age 36)	9
Kevin Newman	Pittsburgh Pirates	R	R	August 4, 1993 (age 33)	4
Kevin Padlo	Seattle Mariners; Tampa Bay Rays	R	R	July 15, 1996 (age 30)	1
Kevin Pillar	New York Mets	R	R	January 4, 1989 (age 37)	9
Kevin Plawecki	Boston Red Sox	R	R	February 26, 1991 (age 35)	7
Kevin Quackenbush	Los Angeles Dodgers	R	R	November 28, 1988 (age 37)	6
Kevin Smith	Toronto Blue Jays	R	R	July 4, 1996 (age 30)	1
Keynan Middleton	Seattle Mariners	R	R	September 12, 1993 (age 33)	5
Khalil Lee	New York Mets	L	L	June 26, 1998 (age 28)	1
Khris Davis	Oakland Athletics; Texas Rangers	R	R	December 21, 1987 (age 38)	9
Kirby Snead	Toronto Blue Jays	L	L	October 7, 1994 (age 32)	1
Kodi Whitley	St. Louis Cardinals	R	R	February 21, 1995 (age 31)	2
Kohl Stewart	Chicago Cubs	R	R	October 7, 1994 (age 32)	3
Kolby Allard	Texas Rangers	L	L	August 13, 1997 (age 29)	4
Kole Calhoun	Arizona Diamondbacks	L	L	October 14, 1987 (age 39)	10
Kolten Wong	Milwaukee Brewers	L	R	October 10, 1990 (age 36)	9
Konner Wade	Baltimore Orioles	L	R	December 3, 1991 (age 34)	1
Kris Bryant	Colorado Rockies	R	R	January 4, 1992 (age 34)	7
Kris Bubic	Kansas City Royals	L	L	August 19, 1997 (age 29)	2
Kurt Suzuki	Los Angeles Angels	R	R	October 4, 1983 (age 43)	15
Kutter Crawford	Boston Red Sox	R	R	April 1, 1996 (age 30)	1
Kyle Barraclough	Minnesota Twins	R	R	May 23, 1990 (age 36)	6
Kyle Cody	Texas Rangers	R	R	August 9, 1994 (age 32)	2
Kyle Crick	Pittsburgh Pirates	L	R	November 30, 1992 (age 33)	5
Kyle Dohy	Philadelphia Phillies	L	L	September 17, 1996 (age 30)	1
Kyle Farmer	Cincinnati Reds	R	R	August 17, 1990 (age 36)	5
Kyle Finnegan	Washington Nationals	R	R	September 4, 1991 (age 35)	2
Kyle Freeland	Colorado Rockies	L	L	May 14, 1993 (age 33)	5
Kyle Funkhouser	Detroit Tigers	R	R	March 16, 1994 (age 32)	2
Kyle Garlick	Minnesota Twins	R	R	January 26, 1992 (age 34)	3
Kyle Gibson	Philadelphia Phillies; Texas Rangers	R	R	October 23, 1987 (age 39)	9
Kyle Hendricks	Chicago Cubs	R	R	December 7, 1989 (age 36)	8
Kyle Higashioka	New York Yankees	R	R	April 20, 1990 (age 36)	5
Kyle Isbel	Kansas City Royals	L	R	March 3, 1997 (age 29)	1
Kyle Keller	Pittsburgh Pirates	R	R	April 28, 1993 (age 33)	3
Kyle Lewis	Seattle Mariners	R	R	July 13, 1995 (age 31)	3
Kyle Lobstein	Washington Nationals	L	L	August 12, 1989 (age 37)	4
Kyle McGowin	Washington Nationals	R	R	November 27, 1991 (age 34)	4
Kyle Muller	Atlanta Braves	R	L	October 7, 1997 (age 29)	1
Kyle Nelson	Cleveland Indians	L	L	July 8, 1996 (age 30)	2
Kyle Ryan	Chicago Cubs	L	L	September 25, 1991 (age 35)	7
Kyle Schwarber	Philadelphia Phillies	L	R	March 5, 1993 (age 33)	7
Kyle Tucker	Houston Astros	L	R	January 17, 1997 (age 29)	4
Kyle Tyler	Los Angeles Angels	R	R	December 27, 1996 (age 29)	1
Kyle Wright	Atlanta Braves	R	R	October 2, 1995 (age 31)	4
Kyle Zimmer	Kansas City Royals	R	R	September 13, 1991 (age 35)	3
LaMonte Wade Jr.	San Francisco Giants	L	L	January 1, 1994 (age 32)	3
Lance Lynn	Chicago White Sox	B	R	May 12, 1987 (age 39)	10
Lance McCullers Jr.	Houston Astros	L	R	October 2, 1993 (age 33)	6
Lane Thomas	St. Louis Cardinals; Washington Nationals	R	R	August 23, 1995 (age 31)	3
Lars Nootbaar	St. Louis Cardinals	L	R	September 8, 1997 (age 29)	1
Lewis Brinson	Miami Marlins	R	R	May 8, 1994 (age 32)	5
Ljay Newsome	Seattle Mariners	R	R	November 8, 1996 (age 29)	2
Logan Allen	Cleveland Indians	R	L	May 23, 1997 (age 29)	3
Logan Gilbert	Seattle Mariners	R	R	May 5, 1997 (age 29)	1
Logan Webb	San Francisco Giants	R	R	November 18, 1996 (age 29)	3
Lorenzo Cain	Milwaukee Brewers	R	R	April 13, 1986 (age 40)	12
Lou Trivino	Oakland Athletics	R	R	October 1, 1991 (age 35)	4
Louis Head	Tampa Bay Rays	R	R	April 23, 1990 (age 36)	1
Lucas Gilbreath	Colorado Rockies	L	L	March 5, 1996 (age 30)	1
Lucas Giolito	Chicago White Sox	R	R	July 14, 1994 (age 32)	6
Lucas Luetge	New York Yankees	L	L	March 24, 1987 (age 39)	5
Lucas Sims	Cincinnati Reds	R	R	May 10, 1994 (age 32)	5
Luis Campusano	San Diego Padres	R	R	September 29, 1998 (age 28)	2
Luis García Jr.	Washington Nationals	L	R	May 16, 2000 (age 26)	2
Luke Farrell	Minnesota Twins	L	R	June 7, 1991 (age 35)	5
Luke Jackson	Atlanta Braves	R	R	August 24, 1991 (age 35)	7
Luke Maile	Milwaukee Brewers	R	R	February 6, 1991 (age 35)	6
Luke Raley	Los Angeles Dodgers	L	R	September 19, 1994 (age 32)	1
Luke Voit	San Diego Padres	R	R	February 13, 1991 (age 35)	5
Luke Weaver	Arizona Diamondbacks	R	R	August 21, 1993 (age 33)	6
Luke Williams	Philadelphia Phillies	R	R	August 9, 1996 (age 30)	1
Mac Sceroler	Baltimore Orioles	R	R	April 9, 1995 (age 31)	1
Madison Bumgarner	Arizona Diamondbacks	R	L	August 1, 1989 (age 37)	13
Manny Barreda	Baltimore Orioles	R	R	October 8, 1988 (age 38)	1
Manny Machado	San Diego Padres	R	R	July 6, 1992 (age 34)	10
Marco Gonzales	Seattle Mariners	L	L	February 16, 1992 (age 34)	7
Marcus Semien	Texas Rangers	R	R	September 17, 1990 (age 36)	9
Marcus Stroman	Chicago Cubs	R	R	May 1, 1991 (age 35)	7
Mark Canha	New York Mets	R	R	February 15, 1989 (age 37)	7
Mark Melancon	San Diego Padres	R	R	March 28, 1985 (age 41)	13
Mark Payton	Cincinnati Reds	L	L	December 7, 1991 (age 34)	2
Mason Thompson	San Diego Padres; Washington Nationals	R	R	February 20, 1998 (age 28)	1
Mason Williams	New York Mets	L	R	August 21, 1991 (age 35)	7
Matt Adams	Colorado Rockies	L	R	August 31, 1988 (age 38)	10
Matt Andriese	Boston Red Sox; Seattle Mariners	R	R	August 28, 1989 (age 37)	7
Matt Barnes	Boston Red Sox	R	R	June 17, 1990 (age 36)	8
Matt Beaty	Los Angeles Dodgers	L	R	April 28, 1993 (age 33)	3
Matt Bush	Texas Rangers	R	R	February 8, 1986 (age 40)	4
Matt Carpenter	New York Yankees	L	R	November 26, 1985 (age 40)	11
Matt Chapman	Toronto Blue Jays	R	R	April 28, 1993 (age 33)	5
Matt Duffy	Chicago Cubs	R	R	January 15, 1991 (age 35)	6
Matt Foster	Chicago White Sox	R	R	January 27, 1995 (age 31)	2
Matt Harvey	Baltimore Orioles	R	R	March 27, 1989 (age 37)	9
Matt Joyce	Philadelphia Phillies	L	R	August 3, 1984 (age 42)	14
Matt Manning	Detroit Tigers	R	R	January 28, 1998 (age 28)	1
Matt Moore	Texas Rangers	L	L	June 18, 1989 (age 37)	10
Matt Olson	Atlanta Braves	L	R	March 29, 1994 (age 32)	6
Matt Peacock	Arizona Diamondbacks	R	R	February 27, 1994 (age 32)	1
Matt Shoemaker	Minnesota Twins	R	R	September 27, 1986 (age 40)	9
Matt Strahm	San Diego Padres	R	L	November 12, 1991 (age 34)	6
Matt Thaiss	Los Angeles Angels	L	R	May 6, 1995 (age 31)	3
Matt Vierling	Philadelphia Phillies	R	R	September 16, 1996 (age 30)	1
Matt Wisler	San Francisco Giants; Tampa Bay Rays	R	R	September 12, 1992 (age 34)	7
Matthew Boyd	Detroit Tigers	L	L	February 2, 1991 (age 35)	7
Max Fried	Atlanta Braves	L	L	January 18, 1994 (age 32)	5
Max Kranick	Pittsburgh Pirates	R	R	July 21, 1997 (age 29)	1
Max Moroff	St. Louis Cardinals	B	R	May 13, 1993 (age 33)	5
Max Muncy	Los Angeles Dodgers	L	R	August 25, 1990 (age 36)	6
Max Scherzer	New York Mets	R	R	July 27, 1984 (age 42)	14
Max Schrock	Cincinnati Reds	L	R	October 12, 1994 (age 32)	2
Max Stassi	Los Angeles Angels	R	R	March 15, 1991 (age 35)	9
Merrill Kelly	Arizona Diamondbacks	R	R	October 14, 1988 (age 38)	3
Michael A. Taylor	Kansas City Royals	R	R	March 26, 1991 (age 35)	8
Michael Brantley	Houston Astros	L	L	May 15, 1987 (age 39)	13
Michael Chavis	Boston Red Sox; Pittsburgh Pirates	R	R	August 11, 1995 (age 31)	3
Michael Conforto	New York Mets	L	R	March 1, 1993 (age 33)	7
Michael Fulmer	Detroit Tigers	R	R	March 15, 1993 (age 33)	5
Michael Hermosillo	Chicago Cubs	R	R	January 17, 1995 (age 31)	4
Michael King	New York Yankees	R	R	May 25, 1995 (age 31)	3
Michael Kopech	Chicago White Sox	R	R	April 30, 1996 (age 30)	2
Michael Lorenzen	Cincinnati Reds	R	R	January 4, 1992 (age 34)	7
Michael Rucker	Chicago Cubs	R	R	April 27, 1994 (age 32)	1
Michael Wacha	Tampa Bay Rays	R	R	July 1, 1991 (age 35)	9
Mickey Jannis	Baltimore Orioles	R	R	December 16, 1987 (age 38)	1
Mickey Moniak	Philadelphia Phillies	L	R	May 13, 1998 (age 28)	2
Mike Baumann	Baltimore Orioles	R	R	September 10, 1995 (age 31)	1
Mike Brosseau	Tampa Bay Rays	R	R	March 15, 1994 (age 32)	3
Mike Fiers	Oakland Athletics	R	R	June 15, 1985 (age 41)	11
Mike Foltynewicz	Texas Rangers	R	R	October 7, 1991 (age 35)	8
Mike Ford	New York Yankees	L	R	July 4, 1992 (age 34)	3
Mike Freeman	Cincinnati Reds	L	R	August 4, 1987 (age 39)	6
Mike Kickham	Los Angeles Dodgers	L	L	December 12, 1988 (age 37)	4
Mike Mayers	Los Angeles Angels	R	R	December 6, 1991 (age 34)	6
Mike Minor	Kansas City Royals	R	L	December 26, 1987 (age 38)	10
Mike Moustakas	Cincinnati Reds	L	R	September 11, 1988 (age 38)	11
Mike Tauchman	New York Yankees; San Francisco Giants	L	L	December 3, 1990 (age 35)	5
Mike Trout	Los Angeles Angels	R	R	August 7, 1991 (age 35)	11
Mike Wright	Chicago White Sox	R	R	January 3, 1990 (age 36)	6
Mike Yastrzemski	San Francisco Giants	L	L	August 23, 1990 (age 36)	3
Mike Zunino	Tampa Bay Rays	R	R	March 25, 1991 (age 35)	9
Miles Mikolas	St. Louis Cardinals	R	R	August 23, 1988 (age 38)	6
Mitch Garver	Minnesota Twins	R	R	January 15, 1991 (age 35)	5
Mitch Haniger	Seattle Mariners	R	R	December 23, 1990 (age 35)	5
Mitch Keller	Pittsburgh Pirates	R	R	April 4, 1996 (age 30)	3
Mitch Moreland	Oakland Athletics	L	L	September 6, 1985 (age 41)	12
Mitch White	Los Angeles Dodgers	R	R	December 28, 1994 (age 31)	2
Monte Harrison	Miami Marlins	R	R	August 10, 1995 (age 31)	2
Mookie Betts	Los Angeles Dodgers	R	R	October 7, 1992 (age 34)	8
Mychal Givens	Cincinnati Reds; Colorado Rockies	R	R	May 13, 1990 (age 36)	7
Myles Straw	Cleveland Indians; Houston Astros	R	R	October 17, 1994 (age 32)	4
Nate Jones	Atlanta Braves; Los Angeles Dodgers	R	R	January 28, 1986 (age 40)	10
Nate Pearson	Toronto Blue Jays	R	R	August 20, 1996 (age 30)	2
Nathan Eovaldi	Boston Red Sox	R	R	February 13, 1990 (age 36)	10
Nathaniel Lowe	Texas Rangers	L	R	July 7, 1995 (age 31)	3
Nick Ahmed	Arizona Diamondbacks	R	R	March 15, 1990 (age 36)	8
Nick Allgeyer	Toronto Blue Jays	L	L	February 3, 1996 (age 30)	1
Nick Anderson	Tampa Bay Rays	R	R	July 5, 1990 (age 36)	3
Nick Castellanos	Philadelphia Phillies	R	R	March 4, 1992 (age 34)	9
Nick Ciuffo	Baltimore Orioles	L	R	March 7, 1995 (age 31)	3
Nick Fortes	Miami Marlins	R	R	November 11, 1996 (age 29)	1
Nick Gordon	Minnesota Twins	L	R	October 24, 1995 (age 31)	1
Nick Heath	Arizona Diamondbacks	L	L	November 27, 1993 (age 32)	2
Nick Madrigal	Chicago Cubs	R	R	March 5, 1997 (age 29)	2
Nick Margevicius	Seattle Mariners	L	L	June 18, 1996 (age 30)	3
Nick Martini	Chicago Cubs	L	L	June 27, 1990 (age 36)	3
Nick Maton	Philadelphia Phillies	L	R	February 18, 1997 (age 29)	1
Nick Mears	Pittsburgh Pirates	R	R	October 7, 1996 (age 30)	2
Nick Neidert	Miami Marlins	R	R	November 20, 1996 (age 29)	2
Nick Nelson	New York Yankees	R	R	December 5, 1995 (age 30)	2
Nick Ramirez	San Diego Padres	L	L	August 1, 1989 (age 37)	3
Nick Sandlin	Cleveland Indians	R	R	January 10, 1997 (age 29)	1
Nick Senzel	Cincinnati Reds	R	R	June 29, 1995 (age 31)	3
Nick Snyder	Texas Rangers	R	R	October 10, 1995 (age 31)	1
Nick Solak	Texas Rangers	R	R	January 11, 1995 (age 31)	3
Nick Tropeano	New York Mets; San Francisco Giants	R	R	August 27, 1990 (age 36)	7
Nick Vincent	Minnesota Twins	R	R	July 12, 1986 (age 40)	10
Nick Williams	Chicago White Sox	L	L	September 8, 1993 (age 33)	4
Nick Wittgren	Cleveland Indians	R	R	May 29, 1991 (age 35)	6
Nicky Lopez	Kansas City Royals	L	R	March 13, 1995 (age 31)	3
Nico Hoerner	Chicago Cubs	R	R	May 13, 1997 (age 29)	3
Niko Goodrum	Detroit Tigers	B	R	February 28, 1992 (age 34)	5
Noah Syndergaard	New York Mets	L	R	August 29, 1992 (age 34)	6
Noe Ramirez	Arizona Diamondbacks; Los Angeles Angels	R	R	December 22, 1989 (age 36)	7
Nolan Arenado	St. Louis Cardinals	R	R	April 16, 1991 (age 35)	9
Owen Miller	Cleveland Indians	R	R	November 15, 1996 (age 29)	1
P. J. Higgins	Chicago Cubs	R	R	May 10, 1993 (age 33)	1
Packy Naughton	Los Angeles Angels	R	L	April 16, 1996 (age 30)	1
Pat Valaika	Baltimore Orioles	R	R	September 9, 1992 (age 34)	6
Patrick Corbin	Washington Nationals	L	L	July 19, 1989 (age 37)	9
Patrick Kivlehan	San Diego Padres	R	R	December 22, 1989 (age 36)	4
Patrick Mazeika	New York Mets	L	R	October 14, 1993 (age 33)	1
Patrick Murphy	Toronto Blue Jays; Washington Nationals	R	R	June 10, 1995 (age 31)	2
Patrick Sandoval	Los Angeles Angels	L	L	October 18, 1996 (age 30)	3
Patrick Weigel	Milwaukee Brewers	R	R	July 8, 1994 (age 32)	2
Patrick Wisdom	Chicago Cubs	R	R	August 27, 1991 (age 35)	4
Paul Blackburn	Oakland Athletics	R	R	December 4, 1993 (age 32)	5
Paul Campbell	Miami Marlins	L	R	July 26, 1995 (age 31)	1
Paul DeJong	St. Louis Cardinals	R	R	August 2, 1993 (age 33)	5
Paul Fry	Baltimore Orioles	L	L	July 26, 1992 (age 34)	4
Paul Goldschmidt	St. Louis Cardinals	R	R	September 10, 1987 (age 39)	11
Paul Sewald	Seattle Mariners	R	R	May 26, 1990 (age 36)	5
Pavin Smith	Arizona Diamondbacks	L	L	February 6, 1996 (age 30)	2
Payton Henry	Miami Marlins	R	R	June 24, 1997 (age 29)	1
Pete Alonso	New York Mets	R	R	December 7, 1994 (age 31)	3
Pete Fairbanks	Tampa Bay Rays	R	R	December 16, 1993 (age 32)	3
Pete Kozma	Oakland Athletics	R	R	April 11, 1988 (age 38)	8
Peter Lambert	Colorado Rockies	R	R	April 18, 1997 (age 29)	2
Peter Solomon	Houston Astros	R	R	August 16, 1996 (age 30)	1
Phil Bickford	Los Angeles Dodgers; Milwaukee Brewers	R	R	July 10, 1995 (age 31)	2
Phil Gosselin	Los Angeles Angels	R	R	October 3, 1988 (age 38)	9
Phil Maton	Cleveland Indians; Houston Astros	R	R	March 25, 1993 (age 33)	5
Phillip Evans	Pittsburgh Pirates	R	R	September 10, 1992 (age 34)	4
Pierce Johnson	San Diego Padres	R	R	May 10, 1991 (age 35)	4
Preston Guilmet	Miami Marlins	R	R	July 27, 1987 (age 39)	5
R. J. Alaniz	Cincinnati Reds	R	R	June 14, 1991 (age 35)	2
Ralph Garza	Houston Astros; Minnesota Twins	R	R	April 6, 1994 (age 32)	1
Randal Grichuk	Toronto Blue Jays	R	R	August 13, 1991 (age 35)	8
Randy Dobnak	Minnesota Twins	R	R	January 17, 1995 (age 31)	3
Reese McGuire	Toronto Blue Jays	L	R	March 2, 1995 (age 31)	4
Reid Detmers	Los Angeles Angels	L	L	July 8, 1999 (age 27)	1
Reiss Knehr	San Diego Padres	L	R	November 3, 1996 (age 29)	1
Rex Brothers	Chicago Cubs	L	L	December 18, 1987 (age 38)	9
Rhys Hoskins	Philadelphia Phillies	R	R	March 17, 1993 (age 33)	5
Rich Hill	New York Mets; Tampa Bay Rays	L	L	March 11, 1980 (age 46)	17
Richard Bleier	Miami Marlins	L	L	April 16, 1987 (age 39)	6
Richard Lovelady	Kansas City Royals	L	L	July 7, 1995 (age 31)	3
Richie Martin	Baltimore Orioles	R	R	December 22, 1994 (age 31)	2
Riley Adams	Toronto Blue Jays; Washington Nationals	R	R	June 26, 1996 (age 30)	1
Riley O'Brien	Cincinnati Reds	R	R	February 6, 1995 (age 31)	1
Riley Smith	Arizona Diamondbacks	R	R	January 15, 1995 (age 31)	2
Rio Ruiz	Baltimore Orioles; Colorado Rockies	L	R	May 22, 1994 (age 32)	6
Rob Brantly	New York Yankees	L	R	July 14, 1989 (age 37)	7
Robbie Grossman	Detroit Tigers	B	L	September 16, 1989 (age 37)	9
Robbie Ray	Seattle Mariners	L	L	October 1, 1991 (age 35)	8
Robert Dugger	Seattle Mariners	R	R	July 3, 1995 (age 31)	3
Robert Gsellman	New York Mets	R	R	July 18, 1993 (age 33)	6
Robert Stephenson	Colorado Rockies	R	R	February 24, 1993 (age 33)	6
Robert Stock	Chicago Cubs; New York Mets	L	R	November 21, 1989 (age 36)	4
Roel Ramirez	St. Louis Cardinals	R	R	May 26, 1995 (age 31)	2
Roman Quinn	Philadelphia Phillies	B	R	May 14, 1993 (age 33)	5
Romy Gonzalez	Chicago White Sox	R	R	September 6, 1996 (age 30)	1
Ronnie Dawson	Houston Astros	L	R	May 19, 1995 (age 31)	1
Ross Detwiler	Miami Marlins; San Diego Padres	R	L	March 6, 1986 (age 40)	13
Ross Stripling	Toronto Blue Jays	R	R	November 23, 1989 (age 36)	6
Rowdy Tellez	Milwaukee Brewers	L	L	March 16, 1995 (age 31)	4
Rowdy Tellez	Toronto Blue Jays	L	L	March 16, 1995 (age 31)	4
Ryan Borucki	Toronto Blue Jays	L	L	March 31, 1994 (age 32)	4
Ryan Brasier	Boston Red Sox	R	R	August 26, 1987 (age 39)	5
Ryan Buchter	Arizona Diamondbacks	L	L	February 13, 1987 (age 39)	7
Ryan Burr	Chicago White Sox	R	R	May 28, 1994 (age 32)	3
Ryan Castellani	Colorado Rockies	R	R	April 1, 1996 (age 30)	2
Ryan Dorow	Texas Rangers	R	R	August 21, 1995 (age 31)	1
Ryan Feltner	Colorado Rockies	R	R	September 2, 1996 (age 30)	1
Ryan Hartman	Houston Astros	L	L	April 21, 1994 (age 32)	1
Ryan Helsley	St. Louis Cardinals	R	R	July 18, 1994 (age 32)	3
Ryan Hendrix	Cincinnati Reds	R	R	December 16, 1994 (age 31)	1
Ryan Jeffers	Minnesota Twins	R	R	June 3, 1997 (age 29)	2
Ryan LaMarre	New York Yankees	R	L	November 21, 1988 (age 37)	6
Ryan Lavarnway	Cleveland Indians	R	R	August 7, 1987 (age 39)	10
Ryan McBroom	Kansas City Royals	R	L	April 9, 1992 (age 34)	3
Ryan McKenna	Baltimore Orioles	R	R	February 14, 1997 (age 29)	1
Ryan McMahon	Colorado Rockies	L	R	December 14, 1994 (age 31)	5
Ryan Meisinger	Chicago Cubs	R	R	May 4, 1994 (age 32)	3
Ryan Mountcastle	Baltimore Orioles	R	R	February 18, 1997 (age 29)	2
Ryan O'Hearn	Kansas City Royals	L	L	July 26, 1993 (age 33)	4
Ryan Pressly	Houston Astros	R	R	December 15, 1988 (age 37)	9
Ryan Sherriff	Tampa Bay Rays	L	L	May 25, 1990 (age 36)	4
Ryan Tepera	Chicago Cubs; Chicago White Sox	R	R	November 3, 1987 (age 38)	7
Ryan Thompson	Tampa Bay Rays	R	R	June 26, 1992 (age 34)	2
Ryan Vilade	Colorado Rockies	R	R	February 18, 1999 (age 27)	1
Ryan Weathers	San Diego Padres	R	L	December 17, 1999 (age 26)	2
Ryan Weber	Boston Red Sox; Milwaukee Brewers; Seattle Mariners	R	R	August 12, 1990 (age 36)	7
Ryan Yarbrough	Tampa Bay Rays	R	L	December 31, 1991 (age 34)	4
Ryan Zimmerman	Washington Nationals	R	R	September 28, 1984 (age 42)	16
Ryne Harper	Washington Nationals	R	R	March 27, 1989 (age 37)	3
Ryne Stanek	Houston Astros	R	R	July 26, 1991 (age 35)	5
Sal Romano	Cincinnati Reds; Milwaukee Brewers; New York Yankees	L	R	October 12, 1993 (age 33)	5
Sam Clay	Washington Nationals	L	L	June 21, 1993 (age 33)	1
Sam Coonrod	Philadelphia Phillies	R	R	September 22, 1992 (age 34)	3
Sam Haggerty	Seattle Mariners	B	R	May 26, 1994 (age 32)	3
Sam Hentges	Cleveland Indians	L	L	July 18, 1996 (age 30)	1
Sam Hilliard	Colorado Rockies	L	L	February 21, 1994 (age 32)	3
Sam Howard	Pittsburgh Pirates	R	L	March 5, 1993 (age 33)	4
Sam Moll	Oakland Athletics	L	L	January 3, 1992 (age 34)	2
Sam Selman	Los Angeles Angels; San Francisco Giants	R	L	November 14, 1990 (age 35)	3
Sammy Long	San Francisco Giants	L	L	July 8, 1995 (age 31)	1
Scott Alexander	Los Angeles Dodgers	L	L	July 10, 1989 (age 37)	7
Scott Barlow	Kansas City Royals	R	R	December 18, 1992 (age 33)	4
Scott Blewett	Kansas City Royals	R	R	April 10, 1996 (age 30)	2
Scott Effross	Chicago Cubs	R	R	December 28, 1993 (age 32)	1
Scott Heineman	Cincinnati Reds	R	R	December 4, 1992 (age 33)	3
Scott Hurst	St. Louis Cardinals	L	R	March 25, 1996 (age 30)	1
Scott Kazmir	San Francisco Giants	L	L	January 24, 1984 (age 42)	13
Scott Kingery	Philadelphia Phillies	R	R	April 29, 1994 (age 32)	4
Scott Schebler	Los Angeles Angels	L	R	October 6, 1990 (age 36)	7
Sean Doolittle	Cincinnati Reds; Seattle Mariners	L	L	September 26, 1986 (age 40)	10
Sean Guenther	Miami Marlins	L	L	December 29, 1995 (age 30)	1
Sean Kazmar Jr.	Atlanta Braves	R	R	August 5, 1984 (age 42)	2
Sean Manaea	San Diego Padres	R	L	February 1, 1992 (age 34)	6
Sean Murphy	Oakland Athletics	R	R	October 4, 1994 (age 32)	3
Sean Newcomb	Chicago Cubs	L	L	June 12, 1993 (age 33)	5
Sean Nolin	Washington Nationals	L	L	December 26, 1989 (age 36)	4
Sean Poppen	Arizona Diamondbacks; Pittsburgh Pirates; Tampa Bay Rays	R	R	March 15, 1994 (age 32)	3
Seby Zavala	Chicago White Sox	R	R	August 28, 1993 (age 33)	2
Sergio Romo	Oakland Athletics	R	R	March 4, 1983 (age 43)	14
Seth Beer	Arizona Diamondbacks	L	R	September 18, 1996 (age 30)	1
Seth Brown	Oakland Athletics	L	L	July 13, 1992 (age 34)	3
Seth Elledge	St. Louis Cardinals	R	R	May 20, 1996 (age 30)	2
Seth Frankoff	Arizona Diamondbacks	R	R	August 27, 1988 (age 38)	3
Seth Lugo	New York Mets	R	R	November 17, 1989 (age 36)	6
Seth Martinez	Houston Astros	R	R	August 29, 1994 (age 32)	1
Shane Baz	Tampa Bay Rays	R	R	June 17, 1999 (age 27)	1
Shane Bieber	Cleveland Indians	R	R	May 31, 1995 (age 31)	4
Shane Greene	Atlanta Braves; Los Angeles Dodgers	R	R	November 17, 1988 (age 37)	8
Shane McClanahan	Tampa Bay Rays	L	L	April 28, 1997 (age 29)	2
Shaun Anderson	Baltimore Orioles; Minnesota Twins; San Diego Padres	R	R	October 29, 1994 (age 31)	3
Shawn Armstrong	Baltimore Orioles; Tampa Bay Rays	R	R	September 11, 1990 (age 36)	7
Shawn Morimando	Miami Marlins	L	L	November 20, 1992 (age 33)	2
Shea Spitzbarth	Pittsburgh Pirates	R	R	October 4, 1994 (age 32)	1
Shed Long	Seattle Mariners	L	R	August 22, 1995 (age 31)	3
Shelby Miller	Chicago Cubs; Pittsburgh Pirates	R	R	October 10, 1990 (age 36)	9
Sheldon Neuse	Los Angeles Dodgers	R	R	December 10, 1994 (age 31)	2
Skye Bolt	Oakland Athletics; San Francisco Giants	B	R	January 15, 1994 (age 32)	2
Sonny Gray	Cincinnati Reds	R	R	November 7, 1989 (age 36)	9
Spencer Howard	Philadelphia Phillies; Texas Rangers	R	R	July 28, 1996 (age 30)	2
Spencer Patton	Texas Rangers	R	R	February 20, 1988 (age 38)	4
Spencer Strider	Atlanta Braves	R	R	October 28, 1998 (age 27)	1
Spencer Turnbull	Detroit Tigers	R	R	September 18, 1992 (age 34)	4
Spenser Watkins	Baltimore Orioles	R	R	August 27, 1992 (age 34)	1
Stefan Crichton	Arizona Diamondbacks	R	R	February 29, 1992 (age 34)	4
Stephen Gonsalves	Boston Red Sox	L	L	July 8, 1994 (age 32)	2
Stephen Nogosek	New York Mets	R	R	January 11, 1995 (age 31)	2
Stephen Piscotty	Oakland Athletics	R	R	January 14, 1991 (age 35)	7
Stephen Ridings	New York Yankees	R	R	August 14, 1995 (age 31)	1
Stephen Strasburg	Washington Nationals	R	R	July 20, 1988 (age 38)	12
Stephen Tarpley	New York Mets	R	L	February 17, 1993 (age 33)	4
Stephen Vogt	Oakland Athletics	L	R	November 1, 1984 (age 41)	9
Steve Cishek	Washington Nationals	R	R	June 18, 1986 (age 40)	12
Steven Brault	Chicago Cubs	L	L	April 29, 1992 (age 34)	6
Steven Duggar	San Francisco Giants	L	R	November 4, 1993 (age 32)	4
Steven Matz	Toronto Blue Jays	R	L	May 29, 1991 (age 35)	7
Steven Okert	Miami Marlins	L	L	July 9, 1991 (age 35)	4
Steven Souza Jr.	Los Angeles Dodgers	R	R	April 24, 1989 (age 37)	7
Stevie Wilkerson	Baltimore Orioles	B	R	January 11, 1992 (age 34)	3
Stuart Fairchild	Cleveland Guardians	R	R	March 17, 1996 (age 30)	1
T. J. McFarland	St. Louis Cardinals	L	L	June 8, 1989 (age 37)	9
T. J. Zeuch	Toronto Blue Jays	R	R	August 1, 1995 (age 31)	3
Taijuan Walker	New York Mets	R	R	August 13, 1992 (age 34)	9
Tanner Anderson	Pittsburgh Pirates	R	R	May 27, 1993 (age 33)	3
Tanner Houck	Boston Red Sox	R	R	June 29, 1996 (age 30)	2
Tanner Rainey	Washington Nationals	R	R	December 25, 1992 (age 33)	4
Tanner Roark	Toronto Blue Jays	R	R	October 5, 1986 (age 40)	9
Tanner Scott	Baltimore Orioles	R	L	July 22, 1994 (age 32)	5
Tarik Skubal	Detroit Tigers	L	L	November 20, 1996 (age 29)	2
Tayler Saucedo	Toronto Blue Jays	L	L	June 18, 1993 (age 33)	1
Taylor Clarke	Arizona Diamondbacks	R	R	May 13, 1993 (age 33)	3
Taylor Davis	Pittsburgh Pirates	R	R	November 28, 1989 (age 36)	4
Taylor Gushue	Chicago Cubs	B	R	December 19, 1993 (age 32)	1
Taylor Hearn	Texas Rangers	L	L	August 30, 1994 (age 32)	3
Taylor Jones	Houston Astros	R	R	December 6, 1993 (age 32)	2
Taylor Motter	Boston Red Sox; Colorado Rockies	R	R	September 18, 1989 (age 37)	4
Taylor Rogers	Minnesota Twins	L	L	December 17, 1990 (age 35)	6
Taylor Trammell	Seattle Mariners	L	L	September 13, 1997 (age 29)	1
Taylor Walls	Tampa Bay Rays	B	R	July 10, 1996 (age 30)	1
Taylor Ward	Los Angeles Angels	R	R	December 14, 1993 (age 32)	4
Taylor Widener	Arizona Diamondbacks	L	R	October 24, 1994 (age 32)	2
Taylor Williams	Miami Marlins; San Diego Padres	B	R	July 21, 1991 (age 35)	5
Tejay Antone	Cincinnati Reds	R	R	December 5, 1993 (age 32)	2
Thomas Eshelman	Baltimore Orioles	R	R	June 20, 1994 (age 32)	3
Thomas Hatch	Toronto Blue Jays	R	R	September 29, 1994 (age 32)	2
Thomas Szapucki	New York Mets	R	L	June 12, 1996 (age 30)	1
Tim Anderson	Chicago White Sox	R	R	June 23, 1993 (age 33)	6
Tim Hill	San Diego Padres	R	L	February 10, 1990 (age 36)	4
Tim Locastro	Arizona Diamondbacks; New York Yankees	R	R	July 14, 1992 (age 34)	5
Tim Lopes	Milwaukee Brewers	R	R	June 24, 1994 (age 32)	3
Tim Mayza	Toronto Blue Jays	L	L	January 15, 1992 (age 34)	4
TJ Friedl	Cincinnati Reds	L	L	August 14, 1995 (age 31)	1
Todd Frazier	Pittsburgh Pirates	R	R	February 12, 1986 (age 40)	11
Tom Murphy	Seattle Mariners	R	R	April 3, 1991 (age 35)	6
Tommy Edman	St. Louis Cardinals	B	R	May 9, 1995 (age 31)	3
Tommy Hunter	New York Mets	R	R	July 3, 1986 (age 40)	14
Tommy La Stella	San Francisco Giants	L	R	January 31, 1989 (age 37)	8
Tommy Milone	Toronto Blue Jays	L	L	February 16, 1987 (age 39)	11
Tommy Nance	Chicago Cubs	R	R	March 19, 1991 (age 35)	1
Tommy Pham	Cincinnati Reds	R	R	March 8, 1988 (age 38)	8
Tony Gonsolin	Los Angeles Dodgers	R	R	May 14, 1994 (age 32)	3
Tony Kemp	Oakland Athletics	L	R	October 31, 1991 (age 34)	6
Tony Santillan	Cincinnati Reds	R	R	April 15, 1997 (age 29)	1
Tony Watson	Los Angeles Angels; San Francisco Giants	L	L	May 30, 1985 (age 41)	11
Tony Wolters	Chicago Cubs	L	R	June 9, 1992 (age 34)	6
Touki Toussaint	Atlanta Braves	R	R	June 20, 1996 (age 30)	4
Travis Bergen	Toronto Blue Jays	L	L	October 8, 1993 (age 33)	3
Travis Blankenhorn	Minnesota Twins; New York Mets	L	R	August 3, 1996 (age 30)	2
Travis d'Arnaud	Atlanta Braves	R	R	February 10, 1989 (age 37)	9
Travis Demeritte	Atlanta Braves	R	R	September 30, 1994 (age 32)	3
Travis Jankowski	New York Mets	L	R	June 15, 1991 (age 35)	7
Travis Lakins	Baltimore Orioles	R	R	June 29, 1994 (age 32)	3
Travis Shaw	Boston Red Sox; Milwaukee Brewers	L	R	April 16, 1990 (age 36)	7
Trayce Thompson	Chicago Cubs	R	R	March 15, 1991 (age 35)	5
Trea Turner	Los Angeles Dodgers	R	R	June 30, 1993 (age 33)	7
Trent Giambrone	Chicago Cubs	R	R	December 20, 1993 (age 32)	1
Trent Grisham	San Diego Padres	L	L	November 1, 1996 (age 29)	3
Trent Thornton	Toronto Blue Jays	R	R	September 30, 1993 (age 33)	3
Tres Barrera	Washington Nationals	R	R	September 15, 1994 (age 32)	2
Trevor Bauer	Los Angeles Dodgers	R	R	January 17, 1991 (age 35)	10
Trevor Cahill	Pittsburgh Pirates	R	R	March 1, 1988 (age 38)	13
Trevor Hildenberger	New York Mets	R	R	December 15, 1990 (age 35)	4
Trevor Larnach	Minnesota Twins	L	R	February 26, 1997 (age 29)	1
Trevor May	New York Mets	R	R	September 23, 1989 (age 37)	7
Trevor Megill	Chicago Cubs	L	R	December 5, 1993 (age 32)	1
Trevor Richards	Toronto Blue Jays	R	R	May 15, 1993 (age 33)	4
Trevor Rogers	Miami Marlins	L	L	November 13, 1997 (age 28)	2
Trevor Stephan	Cleveland Indians	R	R	November 25, 1995 (age 30)	1
Trevor Story	Boston Red Sox	R	R	November 15, 1992 (age 33)	6
Trevor Williams	Chicago Cubs; New York Mets	R	R	April 25, 1992 (age 34)	6
Trey Amburgey	New York Yankees	R	R	October 24, 1994 (age 32)	1
Trey Mancini	Baltimore Orioles	R	R	March 18, 1992 (age 34)	5
Triston McKenzie	Cleveland Indians	R	R	August 2, 1997 (age 29)	2
Troy Stokes Jr.	Pittsburgh Pirates	R	R	February 2, 1996 (age 30)	1
Tucker Barnhart	Cincinnati Reds	L	R	January 7, 1991 (age 35)	8
Tucker Davidson	Atlanta Braves	L	L	March 25, 1996 (age 30)	2
Ty France	Seattle Mariners	R	R	July 13, 1994 (age 32)	3
Ty Tice	Atlanta Braves; Toronto Blue Jays	L	R	July 4, 1996 (age 30)	1
Tyler Alexander	Detroit Tigers	R	L	July 14, 1994 (age 32)	3
Tyler Anderson	Pittsburgh Pirates; Seattle Mariners	L	L	December 30, 1989 (age 36)	6
Tyler Beede	San Francisco Giants	R	R	May 23, 1993 (age 33)	3
Tyler Chatwood	San Francisco Giants; Toronto Blue Jays	R	R	December 16, 1989 (age 36)	10
Tyler Clippard	Arizona Diamondbacks	R	R	February 14, 1985 (age 41)	15
Tyler Duffey	Minnesota Twins	R	R	December 27, 1990 (age 35)	7
Tyler Gilbert	Arizona Diamondbacks	L	L	December 22, 1993 (age 32)	1
Tyler Glasnow	Tampa Bay Rays	L	R	August 23, 1993 (age 33)	6
Tyler Ivey	Houston Astros	R	R	May 12, 1996 (age 30)	1
Tyler Kinley	Colorado Rockies	R	R	January 31, 1991 (age 35)	4
Tyler Ladendorf	Chicago Cubs	R	R	March 7, 1988 (age 38)	3
Tyler Mahle	Cincinnati Reds	R	R	September 29, 1994 (age 32)	5
Tyler Matzek	Atlanta Braves	L	L	October 19, 1990 (age 36)	4
Tyler Naquin	Cincinnati Reds	L	R	April 24, 1991 (age 35)	6
Tyler Nevin	Baltimore Orioles	R	R	May 29, 1997 (age 29)	1
Tyler Payne	Chicago Cubs	R	R	October 25, 1992 (age 34)	1
Tyler Rogers	San Francisco Giants	R	R	December 17, 1990 (age 35)	3
Tyler Stephenson	Cincinnati Reds	R	R	August 16, 1996 (age 30)	2
Tyler Wade	New York Yankees	L	R	November 23, 1994 (age 31)	5
Tyler Webb	St. Louis Cardinals	L	L	July 20, 1990 (age 36)	5
Tyler Wells	Baltimore Orioles	R	R	August 26, 1994 (age 32)	1
Tyler Zuber	Kansas City Royals	R	R	June 16, 1995 (age 31)	2
Tylor Megill	New York Mets	R	R	July 28, 1995 (age 31)	1
Tyrone Taylor	Milwaukee Brewers	R	R	January 22, 1994 (age 32)	3
Vince Velasquez	Philadelphia Phillies; San Diego Padres	R	R	June 7, 1992 (age 34)	7
Vinny Nittoli	Seattle Mariners	R	R	November 11, 1990 (age 35)	1
Wade Davis	Kansas City Royals	R	R	September 7, 1985 (age 41)	13
Wade LeBlanc	Baltimore Orioles; St. Louis Cardinals	L	L	August 7, 1984 (age 42)	13
Wade Miley	Chicago Cubs	L	L	November 13, 1986 (age 39)	11
Walker Buehler	Los Angeles Dodgers	R	R	July 28, 1994 (age 32)	5
Wes Benjamin	Texas Rangers	R	L	July 26, 1993 (age 33)	2
Whit Merrifield	Kansas City Royals	R	R	January 24, 1989 (age 37)	6
Wil Crowe	Pittsburgh Pirates	R	R	September 9, 1994 (age 32)	2
Wil Myers	San Diego Padres	R	R	December 10, 1990 (age 35)	9
Will Craig	Pittsburgh Pirates	R	R	November 16, 1994 (age 31)	2
Will Harris	Washington Nationals	R	R	August 28, 1984 (age 42)	10
Will Smith	Atlanta Braves	R	L	July 10, 1989 (age 37)	9
Will Smith	Los Angeles Dodgers	R	R	March 28, 1995 (age 31)	3
Will Vest	Seattle Mariners	R	R	June 6, 1995 (age 31)	1
Willie Calhoun	Texas Rangers	L	R	November 4, 1994 (age 31)	5
Wyatt Mathisen	Arizona Diamondbacks	R	R	December 30, 1993 (age 32)	2
Wyatt Mills	Seattle Mariners	R	R	January 25, 1995 (age 31)	1
Yency Almonte	Colorado Rockies	B	R	June 4, 1994 (age 32)	4
Zac Gallen	Arizona Diamondbacks	R	R	August 3, 1995 (age 31)	3
Zac Lowther	Baltimore Orioles	L	L	April 30, 1996 (age 30)	1
Zac Rosscup	Colorado Rockies	R	L	June 9, 1988 (age 38)	7
Zach Davies	Chicago Cubs	R	R	February 7, 1993 (age 33)	7
Zach Eflin	Philadelphia Phillies	R	R	April 8, 1994 (age 32)	6
Zach McKinstry	Chicago Cubs	L	R	April 29, 1995 (age 31)	2
Zach Plesac	Cleveland Guardians	R	R	January 21, 1995 (age 31)	3
Zach Reks	Los Angeles Dodgers	L	R	November 12, 1993 (age 32)	1
Zach Thompson	Miami Marlins	R	R	October 23, 1993 (age 33)	1
Zack Britton	New York Yankees	L	L	December 22, 1987 (age 38)	11
Zack Burdi	Baltimore Orioles; Chicago White Sox	R	R	March 9, 1995 (age 31)	2
Zack Collins	Chicago White Sox	L	R	February 6, 1995 (age 31)	3
Zack Godley	Milwaukee Brewers	R	R	April 21, 1990 (age 36)	7
Zack Greinke	Kansas City Royals	R	R	October 21, 1983 (age 43)	19
Zack Littell	San Francisco Giants	R	R	October 5, 1995 (age 31)	4
Zack Short	Detroit Tigers	R	R	May 29, 1995 (age 31)	1
Zack Wheeler	Philadelphia Phillies	L	R	May 30, 1990 (age 36)	7

=== Venezuela ===
Name	Team	Bats	Throws	Date of birth	Seasons
Adbert Alzolay	Chicago Cubs	R	R	March 1, 1995 (age 31)	3
Adrián Sánchez	Washington Nationals	R	R	August 16, 1990 (age 36)	4
Alcides Escobar	Washington Nationals	R	R	December 16, 1986 (age 39)	12
Ali Sánchez	St. Louis Cardinals	R	R	January 20, 1997 (age 29)	2
Andrés Giménez	Cleveland Guardians	L	R	September 4, 1998 (age 28)	2
Andrés Machado	Washington Nationals	R	R	April 22, 1993 (age 33)	2
Ángel Zerpa	Kansas City Royals	L	L	September 27, 1999 (age 27)	1
Anthony Castro	Cleveland Guardians	R	R	April 13, 1995 (age 31)	2
Anthony Santander	Baltimore Orioles	S	R	October 19, 1994 (age 32)	5
Antonio Senzatela	Colorado Rockies	R	R	January 21, 1995 (age 31)	5
Asdrúbal Cabrera	Free Agent	S	R	November 13, 1985 (age 40)	15
Avisaíl García	Miami Marlins	R	R	June 12, 1991 (age 35)	10
Brusdar Graterol	Los Angeles Dodgers	R	R	August 26, 1998 (age 28)	3
Carlos Carrasco	New York Mets	R	R	March 21, 1987 (age 39)	12
Carlos Hernández	Kansas City Royals	R	R	March 11, 1997 (age 29)	2
César Hernández	Washington Nationals	S	R	May 23, 1990 (age 36)	9
Darwinzon Hernández	Boston Red Sox	L	L	December 17, 1996 (age 29)	3
David Peralta	Arizona Diamondbacks	L	L	August 14, 1987 (age 39)	8
Deolis Guerra	Oakland Athletics	R	R	April 17, 1989 (age 37)	6
Eduard Bazardo	Boston Red Sox	R	R	September 1, 1995 (age 31)	1
Eduardo Escobar	New York Mets	S	R	January 5, 1989 (age 37)	11
Eduardo Rodríguez	Detroit Tigers	L	L	April 7, 1993 (age 33)	6
Edward Olivares	Kansas City Royals	R	R	March 6, 1996 (age 30)	2
Ehire Adrianza	Washington Nationals	S	R	August 21, 1989 (age 37)	9
Elías Díaz	Colorado Rockies	R	R	November 17, 1990 (age 35)	7
Elieser Hernández	Miami Marlins	R	R	May 3, 1995 (age 31)	4
Elvis Andrus	Oakland Athletics	R	R	August 26, 1988 (age 38)	13
Ender Inciarte	New York Yankees	L	L	October 29, 1990 (age 35)	8
Erick Castillo	Chicago Cubs	R	R	February 25, 1993 (age 33)	1
Eugenio Suárez	Cincinnati Reds	R	R	July 18, 1991 (age 35)	12
Germán Márquez	Colorado Rockies	R	R	February 22, 1995 (age 31)	6
Gleyber Torres	New York Yankees	R	R	December 13, 1996 (age 29)	4
Harold Castro	Detroit Tigers	L	R	November 30, 1993 (age 32)	4
Hernán Pérez	Atlanta Braves	R	R	March 26, 1991 (age 35)	10
Humberto Arteaga	Free Agent	R	R	January 23, 1994 (age 32)	2
Ildemaro Vargas	Chicago Cubs	S	R	July 16, 1991 (age 35)	5
Jesús Aguilar	Miami Marlins	R	R	June 30, 1990 (age 36)	8
Jesús Tinoco	Texas Rangers	R	R	April 30, 1995 (age 31)	3
Jhonathan Díaz	Los Angeles Angels	L	L	September 13, 1996 (age 30)	1
Jhoulys Chacín	Colorado Rockies	R	R	January 7, 1988 (age 38)	13
Jose Altuve	Houston Astros	R	R	May 6, 1990 (age 36)	11
José Alvarado	Philadelphia Phillies	L	L	May 21, 1995 (age 31)	5
José Álvarez	San Francisco Giants	L	L	May 6, 1989 (age 37)	9
José Godoy	Minnesota Twins	L	R	October 13, 1994 (age 32)	1
José Peraza	New York Yankees	R	R	April 30, 1994 (age 32)	7
José Quijada	Los Angeles Angels	L	L	November 9, 1995 (age 30)	3
José Rondón	Free Agent	R	R	March 3, 1994 (age 32)	4
José Ruiz	Chicago White Sox	R	R	October 21, 1994 (age 32)	5
José Suárez	Los Angeles Angels	L	L	January 3, 1998 (age 28)	3
Keibert Ruiz	Washington Nationals	S	R	July 20, 1998 (age 28)	2
Kervin Castro	San Francisco Giants	R	R	February 7, 1999 (age 27)	1
Luis Arráez	Minnesota Twins	L	R	April 9, 1997 (age 29)	3
Luis Avilán	Washington Nationals	L	L	July 19, 1989 (age 37)	10
Luis García	Houston Astros	R	R	December 13, 1996 (age 29)	2
Luis Guillorme	Atlanta Braves	L	R	September 27, 1994 (age 32)	4
Luis Oviedo	Cleveland Guardians	R	R	May 15, 1999 (age 27)	1
Luis Rengifo	Los Angeles Angels	S	R	February 26, 1997 (age 29)	3
Luis Torrens	New York Mets	R	R	May 2, 1996 (age 30)	8
Manny Piña	Atlanta Braves	R	R	June 5, 1987 (age 39)	8
Martín Pérez	Texas Rangers	L	L	April 4, 1991 (age 35)	10
Marwin González	New York Yankees	S	R	March 14, 1989 (age 37)	10
Mauricio Llovera	San Francisco Giants	R	R	April 17, 1996 (age 30)	2
Miguel Cabrera	Detroit Tigers	R	R	April 18, 1983 (age 43)	19
Miguel Rojas	Miami Marlins	R	R	February 24, 1989 (age 37)	8
Miguel Yajure	Pittsburgh Pirates	R	R	May 1, 1998 (age 28)	2
Nivaldo Rodríguez	Detroit Tigers	R	R	April 16, 1997 (age 29)	2
Odúbel Herrera	Philadelphia Phillies	L	R	December 29, 1991 (age 34)	6
Omar Narváez	Milwaukee Brewers	L	R	February 10, 1992 (age 34)	6
Orlando Arcia	Atlanta Braves	R	R	August 4, 1994 (age 32)	6
Pablo López	Miami Marlins	L	R	March 7, 1996 (age 30)	4
Pedro Ávila	San Diego Padres	R	R	January 14, 1997 (age 29)	2
Rafael Marchán	Philadelphia Phillies	S	R	February 25, 1999 (age 27)	2
Rafael Ortega	Chicago Cubs	L	R	May 15, 1991 (age 35)	5
Ranger Suárez	Philadelphia Phillies	L	L	August 26, 1995 (age 31)	4
Robert Suárez	San Diego Padres	R	R	March 1, 1991 (age 35)	1
Robinson Chirinos	Baltimore Orioles	R	R	June 5, 1984 (age 42)	10
Ronald Acuña Jr.	Atlanta Braves	R	R	December 18, 1997 (age 28)	4
Ronald Torreyes	Free Agent	R	R	September 2, 1992 (age 34)	7
Rougned Odor	Baltimore Orioles	L	R	February 3, 1994 (age 32)	8
Salvador Pérez	Kansas City Royals	R	R	May 10, 1990 (age 36)	10
Sandy León	Cincinnati Reds	S	R	March 13, 1989 (age 37)	10
Sebastian Rivero	Kansas City Royals	R	R	November 16, 1998 (age 27)	1
Thairo Estrada	San Francisco Giants	R	R	February 22, 1996 (age 30)	3
Tucupita Marcano	Pittsburgh Pirates	L	R	September 16, 1999 (age 27)	1
Víctor Reyes	Detroit Tigers	S	R	October 5, 1994 (age 32)	4
Wilfredo Tovar	Free Agent	R	R	August 11, 1991 (age 35)	4
William Contreras	Atlanta Braves	R	R	December 24, 1997 (age 28)	2
Willians Astudillo	Miami Marlins	R	R	October 14, 1991 (age 35)	4
Willson Contreras	Chicago Cubs	R	R	May 13, 1992 (age 34)	6
Wilmer Flores	San Francisco Giants	R	R	August 6, 1991 (age 35)	9
Wilson Ramos	Free Agent	R	R	August 10, 1987 (age 39)	12
Yohel Pozo	Texas Rangers	R	R	June 14, 1997 (age 29)	1
Yonathan Daza	Colorado Rockies	R	R	February 28, 1994 (age 32)	2
Yonny Hernández	Arizona Diamondbacks	S	R	May 4, 1998 (age 28)	1
Yusmeiro Petit	San Diego Padres	R	R	November 22, 1984 (age 41)	14

== Asia ==
=== Japan ===
Name	Team	Bats	Throws	Date of birth	Seasons
Yu Darvish	San Diego Padres	R	R	August 16, 1986 (age 40)	13
Shota Imanaga	Chicago Cubs	L	L	September 1, 1993 (age 33)	2
Yusei Kikuchi	Los Angeles Angels	L	L	June 17, 1991 (age 35)	7
Kenta Maeda	New York Yankees	R	R	April 11, 1988 (age 38)	9
Yuki Matsui	San Diego Padres	L	L	October 30, 1995 (age 30)	2
Shinnosuke Ogasawara	Washington Nationals	L	L	October 8, 1997 (age 29)	1
Shohei Ohtani	Los Angeles Dodgers	L	R	July 5, 1994 (age 32)	8
Roki Sasaki	Los Angeles Dodgers	R	R	November 3, 2001 (age 24)	1
Kodai Senga	New York Mets	L	R	January 30, 1993 (age 33)	3
Tomoyuki Sugano	Baltimore Orioles	R	R	October 11, 1989 (age 37)	1
Seiya Suzuki	Chicago Cubs	R	R	August 18, 1994 (age 32)	4
Yoshinobu Yamamoto	Los Angeles Dodgers	R	R	August 17, 1998 (age 28)	2
Masataka Yoshida	Boston Red Sox	L	R	July 15, 1993 (age 33)	3

=== South Korea ===
Name	Team	Bats	Throws	Date of birth	Seasons
Ji-hwan Bae	Pittsburgh Pirates	L	R	July 26, 1999 (age 27)	4
Jung-hoo Lee	San Francisco Giants	L	R	August 20, 1998 (age 28)	2
Ha-seong Kim	Tampa Bay Rays	R	R	October 17, 1995 (age 31)	5
Hyeseong Kim	Los Angeles Dodgers	L	R	January 27, 1999 (age 27)	1
Rob Refsnyder	Boston Red Sox	R	R	March 26, 1991 (age 35)	10

=== Taiwan ===
Name	Team	Bats	Throws	Date of birth	Seasons
Tsung-Che Cheng	Boston Red Sox	L	R	July 26, 2001 (age 25)	1
Kai-Wei Teng	Houston Astros	R	R	December 1, 1998 (age 27)	2
Hao-Yu Lee	Detroit Tigers	R	R	February 3, 2003 (age 23)	3

== Europe ==
=== Germany ===
Name	Team	Bats	Throws	Date of birth	Seasons
Brendan Donovan	St. Louis Cardinals	L	R	January 16, 1997 (age 29)	4
Max Kepler	Philadelphia Phillies	L	L	February 10, 1993 (age 33)	11

=== Italy ===
Name	Team	Bats	Throws	Date of birth	Seasons
Sam Aldegheri	Los Angeles Angels	L	L	September 19, 2001 (age 25)	2
Chase Burns	Cincinnati Reds	R	R	January 16, 2003 (age 23)	1

=== Portugal ===
Name	Team	Bats	Throws	Date of birth	Seasons
Isaiah Campbell	Boston Red Sox	R	R	August 15, 1997 (age 29)	3

=== United Kingdom ===
Name	Team	Bats	Throws	Date of birth	Seasons
Michael Petersen	Miami Marlins	R	R	May 16, 1994 (age 32)	2

== Oceania ==
=== Australia ===
Name	Team	Bats	Throws	Date of birth	Seasons
Liam Hendriks	Boston Red Sox	R	R	February 10, 1989 (age 37)	14
Curtis Mead	Chicago White Sox	R	R	October 26, 2000 (age 25)	3
Jack O'Loughlin	Oakland Athletics	L	L	March 14, 2000 (age 26)	1

=== Guam ===
Name	Team	Bats	Throws	Date of birth	Seasons
Sean Reid-Foley	New York Mets	R	R	August 30, 1995 (age 31)	5

== See also ==
- List of countries with their first Major League Baseball player
- List of NBA players born outside the United States
- List of NHL statistical leaders by country of birth
- Foreign players in the National Football League
- List of foreign WNBA players
