= 2021 New York Mets season =

2021 New York Mets
- League: National League
- Division: East
- Ballpark: Citi Field
- City: New York City, New York
- Record: 77–85 (.475)
- Divisional place: 3rd
- Owners: Steve Cohen
- General managers: Jared Porter (until January 19); Zack Scott (acting)
- Manager: Luis Rojas
- Television: SportsNet New York; PIX 11 (CW affiliate) (Gary Cohen, Ron Darling, Keith Hernandez)
- Radio: WCBS 880 AM (English); New York Mets Radio Network (Howie Rose, Wayne Randazzo); Que Buena 92.7 (Spanish) (Juan Alicea, Max Perez Jiminez)

The 2021 New York Mets season was the franchise's 60th season, their 13th season at Citi Field, and their first season under new majority owner Steve Cohen.

The Mets began the 2021 season 35–25 and held first place in the National League East at the All-Star break. The Mets stumbled along the way, losing first place in early August to the Atlanta Braves. On September 25, the Mets were eliminated from playoff contention in a 2–1 loss to the Milwaukee Brewers, continuing a five-year-long playoff drought. On September 26, the team suffered its 82nd loss, sealing their fourth losing season in five years. The Mets spent 103 days in first place, marking the most days in MLB history a team has been in first and finished with a losing record. The Mets finished the regular season 77–85, giving them a third place finish. On October 4, Luis Rojas was declined his club option as manager, following the conclusion of the regular season. Their division rival Braves went on to win the World Series to leave the Mets as the only NL East team to not win the title in the 21st century.

== Uniform ==
The 2021 season was the first since the 2012 season that the team's late 1990s-2000s era black alternate uniforms were worn, but only for select home game days. On July 15, the team announced that starting July 30, the Mets would wear their black jerseys every home Friday game for the rest of the year. It was the first time since July 12, 2012, that the team wore the black alternates. The Mets suited up in the throwback tops on August 13 against the Dodgers, August 27 against the Nationals, September 10 against the Yankees, and September 17 against the Phillies.

== Offseason ==
=== Transactions ===
==== 2020 ====
- November 30 – right-handed reliever Jacob Barnes signs a 1-year, $750,000 contract with the Mets.
- December 2 – right-handed reliever Trevor May signs a 2-year, $15.5 million contract with the Mets.
- December 15 – catcher James McCann signs a 4-year, $40.6 million contract with the Mets.
- December 22 – Noah Syndergaard re-signs with the Mets to a 1-year contract worth $9.7 million.

==== 2021 ====
- January 7 – acquired right-handed pitcher Carlos Carrasco and shortstop Francisco Lindor from the Cleveland Indians for infielders Amed Rosario and Andrés Giménez, and two prospects (Josh Wolf, and Isaiah Greene).
- January 14 – utility player José Martinez signs with the Mets on a 1-year, $1 million contract.
- January 15 – Edwin Díaz re-signs with the Mets on a 1-year, $7 million contract. Seth Lugo re-signs with the Mets on a 1-year, $2.9 million contract. Robert Gsellman re-signs with the Mets on a 1-year, $1.3 million deal. Brandon Nimmo re-signs with the Mets on a 1-year, $4.7 million contract. Michael Conforto re-signs with the Mets on a 1-year, $12.2 million contract. Dominic Smith re-signs with the Mets for a 1-year, $2.5 million contract.
- January 19 – acquired left-handed starting pitcher Joey Lucchesi from the San Diego Padres as part of a three-team trade with the Pittsburgh Pirates in exchange for catching prospect Endy Rodríguez.
- January 27 – acquired right-handed pitchers Sean Reid-Foley, Yennsy Díaz, and Josh Winckowski from the Toronto Blue Jays in exchange for Steven Matz.
- January 30 – left-handed relief pitcher Aaron Loup signs with the Mets on a 1-year, $3 million contract.
- February 1 – acquired right-handed starting pitcher Jordan Yamamoto from the Miami Marlins in exchange for minor league prospect Federico Polanco.
- February 10 – acquired outfielder Khalil Lee from the Kansas City Royals in exchange for right-handed pitcher Josh Winckowski and a player to be named later to the Boston Red Sox. The Mets also signed center fielder Albert Almora Jr. to a 1-year, $1.25 million contract.
- February 11 – infielder Jonathan Villar signs with the Mets on a 1-year, $3.55 million contract.
- February 20 – right-handed starting pitcher Taijuan Walker signs a two-year, $20 million contract with a player option for the 2023 season.
- February 21 – outfielder Kevin Pillar signs with the Mets on a 1-year, $5 million contract.
- March 31 – shortstop Francisco Lindor signs a 10-year, $341 million contract extension with the Mets.

== Regular season ==
=== Transactions ===
==== 2021 ====
- May 18 – acquired outfielder Cameron Maybin from the Chicago Cubs in exchange for cash considerations.
- May 25 – acquired outfielder Billy McKinney from the Milwaukee Brewers in exchange for minor league pitcher Pedro Quintana.
- July 21 – acquired minor league outfielder Carlos Rincon from the Los Angeles Dodgers and cash considerations in exchange for Billy McKinney.
- July 23 – acquired left-handed starting pitcher Rich Hill from the Tampa Bay Rays in exchange for right-handed pitcher Tommy Hunter and minor league catcher Matt Dyer.
- July 30 – acquired shortstop Javier Báez and right-handed pitcher Trevor Williams from the Chicago Cubs for outfielder Pete Crow-Armstrong.

=== National League East ===
NL East
Team	W	L	Pct.	GB	Home	Road
Atlanta Braves	88	73	.547	—	42‍–‍38	46‍–‍35
Philadelphia Phillies	82	80	.506	6½	47‍–‍34	35‍–‍46
New York Mets	77	85	.475	11½	47‍–‍34	30‍–‍51
Miami Marlins	67	95	.414	21½	42‍–‍39	25‍–‍56
Washington Nationals	65	97	.401	23½	35‍–‍46	30‍–‍51

=== National League division leaders ===
Division leaders
Team	W	L	Pct.
San Francisco Giants	107	55	.660
Milwaukee Brewers	95	67	.586
Atlanta Braves	88	73	.547

Wild Card teams (Top 2 teams qualify for postseason)
Team	W	L	Pct.	GB
Los Angeles Dodgers	106	56	.654	+16
St. Louis Cardinals	90	72	.556	—
Cincinnati Reds	83	79	.512	7
Philadelphia Phillies	82	80	.506	8
San Diego Padres	79	83	.488	11
New York Mets	77	85	.475	13
Colorado Rockies	74	87	.460	15½
Chicago Cubs	71	91	.438	19
Miami Marlins	67	95	.414	23
Washington Nationals	65	97	.401	25
Pittsburgh Pirates	61	101	.377	29
Arizona Diamondbacks	52	110	.321	38

=== Record vs. opponents ===
2021 National League record Source: MLB Standings Grid – 2021
Team	AZ	ATL	CHC	CIN	COL	LAD	MIA	MIL	NYM	PHI	PIT	SD	SF	STL	WSH	AL
Arizona	—	3–4	2–4	5–1	9–10	3–16	2–5	1–6	1–5	4–3	4–2	8–11	2–17	1–6	3–4	4–16
Atlanta	4–3	—	5–2	4–3	2–4	2–4	11–8	3–3	10–9	10–9	4–3	4–2	3–3	6–1	14–5	6–14
Chicago	4–2	2–5	—	8–11	3–3	4–3	1–5	4–15	4–3	2–5	14–5	5–1	1–6	9–10	4–3	6–14
Cincinnati	1–5	3–4	11–8	—	5–2	3–3	5–2	9–10	3–3	4–2	13–6	1–6	1–6	10–9	5–2	9–11
Colorado	10–9	4–2	3–3	2–5	—	6–13	4–2	2–5	2–5	5–2	4–2	11–8	4–15	3–4	4–2	10–10
Los Angeles	16–3	4–2	3–4	3–3	13–6	—	3–4	4–3	6–1	4–2	6–0	12–7	9–10	4–3	7–0	12–8
Miami	5–2	8–11	5–1	2–5	2–4	4–3	—	3–3	9–10	10–9	2–5	3–4	3–4	0–6	8–11	3–17
Milwaukee	6–1	3–3	15–4	10–9	5–2	3–4	3–3	—	4–2	2–5	14–5	5–2	4–3	8–11	5–1	8–12
New York	5–1	9–10	3–4	3–3	5–2	1–6	10–9	2–4	—	9–10	3–4	4–3	1–5	2–5	11–8	9–11
Philadelphia	3–4	9–10	5–2	2–4	2–5	2–4	9–10	5–2	10–9	—	4–3	4–2	2–4	4–3	13–6	8–12
Pittsburgh	2–4	3–4	5–14	6–13	2–4	0–6	5–2	5–14	4–3	3–4	—	3–4	4–3	7–12	2–4	10–10
San Diego	11–8	2–4	1–5	6–1	8–11	7–12	4–3	2–5	3–4	2–4	4–3	—	8–11	3–3	4–3	14–6
San Francisco	17–2	3–3	6–1	6–1	15–4	10–9	4–3	3–4	5–1	4–2	3–4	11–8	—	2–4	5–2	13–7
St. Louis	6–1	1–6	10–9	9–10	4–3	3–4	6–0	11–8	5–2	3–4	12–7	3–3	4–2	—	2–4	11–9
Washington	4–3	5–14	3–4	2–5	2–4	0–7	11–8	1–5	8–11	6–13	4–2	3–4	2–5	4–2	—	10–10

=== Game log ===
Legend
Mets Win	Mets Loss	Game Postponed
Bold = Mets team member

2021 Game Log
Overall: 77–85 (Home: 47–34; Away: 30–51)
April: 9–11 (Home: 6–4; Away: 3–7)

#	Date	Opponent	Score	Win	Loss	Save	Location (Attendance)	Record
–	April 1	@ Nationals	Postponed (COVID-19, makeup date June 19)					
–	April 3	@ Nationals	Postponed (COVID-19, makeup date June 28)					
–	April 4	@ Nationals	Postponed (COVID-19, makeup date September 4)					
1	April 5	@ Phillies	3–5	Brogdon (2–0)	**May** (0–1)	Alvarado (1)	Citizens Bank Park (10,782)	0–1
2	April 6	@ Phillies	8–4	**Stroman** (1–0)	Anderson (0–1)	—	Citizens Bank Park (10,752)	1–1
3	April 7	@ Phillies	2–8	Brogdon (3–0)	**Peterson** (0–1)	—	Citizens Bank Park (10,807)	1–2
4	April 8	Marlins	3–2	**Díaz** (1–0)	Bass (0–2)	—	**Citi Field** (8,492)	2–2
5	April 10	Marlins	0–3	Rogers (1–1)	**deGrom** (0–1)	García (1)	**Citi Field** (8,419)	2–3
–	April 11	Marlins	Suspended (Rain, continuation date: August 31)					
–	April 12	Phillies	Postponed (Rain, Makeup: April 13)					
6	April 13 (1)	Phillies	4–3 (8)	**May** (1–1)	Neris (0–1)	—	**Citi Field** (N/A)	3–3
7	April 13 (2)	Phillies	4–0 (7)	**Stroman** (2–0)	Nola (0–1)	—	**Citi Field** (7,611)	4–3
8	April 14	Phillies	5–1	**Peterson** (1–1)	Wheeler (1–2)	—	**Citi Field** (7,520)	5–3
–	April 15	Phillies	Postponed (Rain, Makeup: June 25)					
–	April 16	@ Rockies	Postponed (Snow, Makeup: April 17)					
9	April 17 (1)	@ Rockies	4–3 (7)	**deGrom** (1–1)	Bard (0–1)	**Díaz** (1)	Coors Field (N/A)	6–3
10	April 17 (2)	@ Rockies	2–7 (7)	Márquez (1–1)	**Lucchesi** (0–1)	—	Coors Field (13,906)	6–4
11	April 18	@ Rockies	2–1	**Stroman** (3–0)	Senzatela (1–3)	**Díaz** (2)	Coors Field (15,082)	7–4
12	April 20	@ Cubs	1–3	Arrieta (3–1)	**Walker** (0–1)	Kimbrel (4)	Wrigley Field (10,137)	7–5
13	April 21	@ Cubs	4–16	Mills (1–0)	**Peterson** (1–2)	—	Wrigley Field (10,196)	7–6
14	April 22	@ Cubs	3–4 (10)	Winkler (1–0)	**Díaz** (1–1)	—	Wrigley Field (10,343)	7–7
15	April 23	Nationals	6–0	**deGrom** (2–1)	Fedde (1–2)	—	**Citi Field** (8,130)	8–7
16	April 24	Nationals	1–7	Ross (2–1)	**Stroman** (3–1)	—	**Citi Field** (8,051)	8–8
17	April 25	Nationals	4–0	**Walker** (1–1)	Corbin (0–3)	—	**Citi Field** (7,784)	9–8
18	April 27	Red Sox	1–2	Richards (1–2)	**Peterson** (1–3)	Barnes (5)	**Citi Field** (7,917)	9–9
19	April 28	Red Sox	0–1	Pivetta (3–0)	**deGrom** (2–2)	Barnes (6)	**Citi Field** (8,051)	9–10
20	April 30	@ Phillies	1–2	Anderson (1–3)	**Stroman** (3–2)	Coonrod (1)	Citizens Bank Park (10,914)	9–11

May: 17–9 (Home: 9–1; Away: 8–8)

#	Date	Opponent	Score	Win	Loss	Save	Location (Attendance)	Record
21	May 1	@ Phillies	5–4	**May** (2–1)	Neris (1–3)	**Díaz** (3)	Citizens Bank Park (10,948)	10–11
22	May 2	@ Phillies	8–7	**Barnes** (1–0)	Kintzler (1–1)	**Familia** (1)	Citizens Bank Park (10,964)	11–11
23	May 3	@ Cardinals	5–6	Wainwright (1–3)	**Lucchesi** (0–2)	Reyes (8)	Busch Stadium (12,686)	11–12
—	May 4	@ Cardinals	Postponed (Rain, Makeup: May 5)					
24	May 5 (1)	@ Cardinals	1–4 (7)	Helsley (3–0)	**Stroman** (3–3)	Reyes (9)	Busch Stadium (N/A)	11–13
25	May 5 (2)	@ Cardinals	7–2 (7)	**Yamamoto** (1–0)	Oviedo (0–1)	—	Busch Stadium (13,187)	12–13
26	May 6	@ Cardinals	4–1	**Walker** (2–1)	Gant (2–3)	**Díaz** (4)	Busch Stadium (12,939)	13–13
27	May 7	Diamondbacks	5–4 (10)	**Loup** (1–0)	Crichton (0–1)	—	**Citi Field** (7,662)	14–13
28	May 8	Diamondbacks	4–2	**Lucchesi** (1–2)	Kelly (2–3)	**May** (1)	**Citi Field** (7,908)	15–13
29	May 9	Diamondbacks	4–2	**deGrom** (3–2)	Smith (1–2)	**Díaz** (5)	**Citi Field** (7,880)	16–13
30	May 11	Orioles	3–2	**Familia** (1–0)	Valdez (2–1)	—	**Citi Field** (7,930)	17–13
31	May 12	Orioles	7–1	**Walker** (3–1)	Harvey (3–3)	—	**Citi Field** (8,035)	18–13
32	May 14	@ Rays	2–3	Fairbanks (1–0)	**Castro** (0–1)	—	Tropicana Field (7,123)	18–14
33	May 15	@ Rays	5–12	McClanahan (1–0)	**Lucchesi** (1–3)	—	Tropicana Field (7,536)	18–15
34	May 16	@ Rays	1–7	Fleming (3–3)	**Stroman** (3–4)	—	Tropicana Field (7,355)	18–16
35	May 17	@ Braves	3–1	**Reid-Foley** (1–0)	Fried (1–2)	**Díaz** (6)	Truist Park (22,691)	19–16
36	May 18	@ Braves	4–3	**Familia** (2–0)	Smith (0–4)	**Díaz** (7)	Truist Park (41,149)	20–16
37	May 19	@ Braves	4–5	Smith (1–4)	**Barnes** (1–1)	—	Truist Park (22,619)	20–17
38	May 21	@ Marlins	6–5 (12)	**Smith** (1–0)	Cimber (0–1)	**Barnes** (1)	LoanDepot Park (7,282)	21–17
39	May 22	@ Marlins	1–3	García (3–2)	**Smith** (1–1)	—	LoanDepot Park (7,513)	21–18
40	May 23	@ Marlins	1–5	Poteet (2–0)	**Yamamoto** (1–1)	—	LoanDepot Park (7,945)	21–19
41	May 24	Rockies	2–3	Gomber (3–4)	**Peterson** (1–4)	Estévez (1)	**Citi Field** (8,438)	21–20
42	May 25	Rockies	3–1	**Castro** (1–1)	Gonzalez (2–3)	**Díaz** (8)	**Citi Field** (9,190)	22–20
—	May 26	Rockies	Postponed (Rain, Makeup: May 27)					
43	May 27 (1)	Rockies	1–0 (7)	**Stroman** (4–4)	Márquez (3–5)	**Díaz** (9)	**Citi Field** (N/A)	23–20
44	May 27 (2)	Rockies	4–2 (7)	**Loup** (2–0)	Senzatela (1–5)	**Barnes** (2)	**Citi Field** (9,569)	24–20
—	May 28	Braves	Postponed (Rain, Makeup: June 21)					
45	May 29	Braves	13–2	**Walker** (4–1)	Anderson (4–2)	—	**Citi Field** (10,251)	25–20
—	May 30	Braves	Postponed (Rain, Makeup: July 26)					
46	May 31	@ Diamondbacks	6–2	**deGrom** (4–2)	Kelly (2–6)	—	Chase Field (11,309)	26–20

June: 15–15 (Home: 9–6; Away: 6–9)

#	Date	Opponent	Score	Win	Loss	Save	Location (Attendance)	Record
47	June 1	@ Diamondbacks	5–6 (10)	Young (2–4)	**May** (2–2)	—	Chase Field (9,590)	26–21
48	June 2	@ Diamondbacks	7–6	**Castro** (2–1)	Soria (0–1)	**Díaz** (10)	Chase Field (9,810)	27–21
49	June 3	@ Padres	3–4	Darvish (6–1)	**Walker** (4–2)	Melancon (18)	Petco Park (15,250)	27–22
50	June 4	@ Padres	0–2	Snell (2–2)	**Lucchesi** (1–4)	Melancon (19)	Petco Park (15,250)	27–23
51	June 5	@ Padres	4–0	**deGrom** (5–2)	Musgrove (4–5)	—	Petco Park (15,250)	28–23
52	June 6	@ Padres	6–2	**Stroman** (5–4)	Paddack (2–5)	—	Petco Park (15,250)	29–23
53	June 8	@ Orioles	3–10	Zimmermann (4–3)	**Peterson** (1–5)	—	Camden Yards (9,431)	29–24
54	June 9	@ Orioles	14–1	**Walker** (5–2)	Harvey (3–7)	—	Camden Yards (9,584)	30–24
55	June 11	Padres	3–2	**deGrom** (6–2)	Snell (2–3)	**Díaz** (11)	**Citi Field** (26,637)	31–24
56	June 12	Padres	4–1	**Stroman** (6–4)	Musgrove (4–6)	**Díaz** (12)	**Citi Field** (25,463)	32–24
57	June 13	Padres	3–7	Paddack (3–5)	**Familia** (2–1)	—	**Citi Field** (19,581)	32–25
58	June 14	Cubs	5–2	**Peterson** (2–5)	Arrieta (5–7)	**Díaz** (13)	**Citi Field** (16,383)	33–25
59	June 15	Cubs	3–2	**Walker** (6–2)	Mills (2–1)	**Lugo** (1)	**Citi Field** (17,804)	34–25
60	June 16	Cubs	6–3	**Reid-Foley** (2–0)	Stock (0–1)	**Díaz** (14)	**Citi Field** (23,545)	35–25
61	June 17	Cubs	0–2	Hendricks (9–4)	**Stroman** (6–5)	Kimbrel (19)	**Citi Field** (16,826)	35–26
62	June 18	@ Nationals	0–1	Hand (4–2)	**Díaz** (1–2)	—	Nationals Park (26,246)	35–27
63	June 19 (1)	@ Nationals	5–1 (7)	**Loup** (2–0)	Ross (3–7)	—	Nationals Park (14,434)	36–27
64	June 19 (2)	@ Nationals	2–6 (7)	Lester (1–2)	**Gsellman** (0–1)	Hand (14)	Nationals Park (22,111)	36–28
65	June 20	@ Nationals	2–5	Corbin (5–5)	**Walker** (6–3)	Hand (15)	Nationals Park (30,374)	36–29
66	June 21 (1)	Braves	4–2 (7)	**deGrom** (7–2)	Muller (0–1)	**Díaz** (15)	**Citi Field** (N/A)	37–29
67	June 21 (2)	Braves	0–1 (7)	Anderson (5–3)	**Castro** (2–2)	Smith (14)	**Citi Field** (18,698)	37–30
68	June 22	Braves	0–3	Morton (7–3)	**Díaz** (0–1)	Smith (15)	**Citi Field** (17,063)	37–31
69	June 23	Braves	7–3	**Oswalt** (1–0)	Wright (0–1)	**Díaz** (16)	**Citi Field** (15,645)	38–31
70	June 25 (1)	Phillies	2–1 (8)	**Lugo** (1–0)	Suárez (3–2)	—	**Citi Field** (N/A)	39–31
71	June 25 (2)	Phillies	1–2 (8)	Bradley (3–1)	**Reid-Foley** (2–1)	Neris (11)	**Citi Field** (29,012)	39–32
72	June 26	Phillies	4–3	**Díaz** (2–2)	Neris (1–5)	—	**Citi Field** (29,205)	40–32
73	June 27	Phillies	2–4	Wheeler (6–4)	**Stroman** (6–6)	Bradley (1)	**Citi Field** (25,488)	40–33
74	June 28	@ Nationals	4–8	Espino (2–2)	**Eickhoff** (0–1)	Hand (17)	Nationals Park (19,150)	40–34
75	June 29	@ Braves	4–3	**Smith** (3–1)	Minter (1–3)	**Díaz** (17)	Truist Park (29,274)	41–34
76	June 30	@ Braves	2–20	Fried (5–4)	**Peterson** (2–6)	—	Truist Park (28,405)	41–35

July: 14–13 (Home: 9–8; Away: 5–5)

#	Date	Opponent	Score	Win	Loss	Save	Location (Attendance)	Record
77	July 1	@ Braves	3–4	Smith (2–5)	**Lugo** (1–1)	—	Truist Park (35,777)	41–36
—	July 2	@ Yankees	Postponed (Rain, Makeup: July 4)					
78	July 3	@ Yankees	8–3	**Walker** (7–3)	Montgomery (3–3)	—	Yankee Stadium (40,047)	42–36
79	July 4 (1)	@ Yankees	10–5 (7)	**Familia** (3–1)	Chapman (5–3)	—	Yankee Stadium (42,714)	43–36
80	July 4 (2)	@ Yankees	2–4 (7)	Green (3–4)	**Oswalt** (1–1)	—	Yankee Stadium (42,107)	43–37
81	July 5	Brewers	4–2	**Lugo** (2–1)	Woodruff (7–4)	**Díaz** (18)	**Citi Field** (15,145)	44–37
—	July 6	Brewers	Postponed (Rain, Makeup: July 7)					
82	July 7 (1)	Brewers	4–3 (8)	**Díaz** (3–2)	Suter (8–4)	—	**Citi Field** (20,953)	45–37
83	July 7 (2)	Brewers	0–5 (7)	Cousins (1–0)	**Stock** (0–2)	—	**Citi Field** (13,218)	45–38
—	July 8	Pirates	Postponed (Rain, Makeup: July 10)					
84	July 9	Pirates	13–4	**Loup** (3–0)	Brubaker (4–9)	—	**Citi Field** (20,350)	46–38
85	July 10 (1)	Pirates	2–6 (7)	Anderson (5–8)	**Stroman** (6–7)	—	**Citi Field** (N/A)	46–39
86	July 10 (2)	Pirates	4–2 (7)	**Familia** (4–1)	Kranick (1–1)	**Díaz** (19)	**Citi Field** (31,924)	47–39
87	July 11	Pirates	5–6	Bednar (2–1)	**Díaz** (3–3)	Rodríguez (12)	**Citi Field** (26,420)	47–40
**91st All-Star Game in Denver, Colorado**
88	July 16	@ Pirates	1–4	Kuhl (3–5)	**Stroman** (6–8)	Rodríguez (13)	PNC Park (18,119)	47–41
89	July 17	@ Pirates	7–9	Holmes (3–2)	**Díaz** (3–4)	—	PNC Park (27,222)	47–42
90	July 18	@ Pirates	7–6	**Familia** (5–1)	Rodríguez (4–2)	**May** (2)	PNC Park (17,837)	48–42
91	July 19	@ Reds	15–11 (11)	**Banda** (1–0)	García (0–1)	**May** (3)	Great American Ball Park (17,080)	49–42
92	July 20	@ Reds	3–4	Miley (8–4)	**Nogosek** (0–1)	Garrett (7)	Great American Ball Park (19,096)	49–43
93	July 21	@ Reds	7–0	**Stroman** (7–8)	Hoffman (3–5)	—	Great American Ball Park (19,896)	50–43
94	July 23	Blue Jays	3–0	**Megill** (1–0)	Matz (8–5)	**Díaz** (20)	**Citi Field** (28,126)	51–43
95	July 24	Blue Jays	3–10	Richards (4–0)	**Walker** (7–4)	—	**Citi Field** (29,269)	51–44
96	July 25	Blue Jays	5–4	**Lugo** (3–1)	Barnes (1–2)	**Díaz** (21)	**Citi Field** (23,675)	52–44
97	July 26 (1)	Braves	0–2 (7)	Muller (2–3)	**Stroman** (7–9)	Smith (20)	**Citi Field** (N/A)	52–45
98	July 26 (2)	Braves	1–0 (7)	**May** (3–2)	Jackson (1–2)	**Díaz** (22)	**Citi Field** (24,384)	53–45
99	July 27	Braves	5–12	Morton (10–3)	**Eickhoff** (0–2)	—	**Citi Field** (24,000)	53–46
100	July 28	Braves	2–1	**May** (4–2)	Fried (7–7)	**Díaz** (23)	**Citi Field** (25,787)	54–46
101	July 29	Braves	3–6	Chavez (1–2)	**Walker** (7–5)	Smith (21)	**Citi Field** (26,080)	54–47
102	July 30	Reds	2–6	Gray (3–6)	**Castro** (2–3)	—	**Citi Field** (31,787)	54–48
103	July 31	Reds	5–4 (10)	**Díaz** (4–4)	Cessa (3–2)	—	**Citi Field** (26,477)	55–48

August: 10–19 (Home: 7–8; Away: 3–11)

#	Date	Opponent	Score	Win	Loss	Save	Location (Attendance)	Record
104	August 1	Reds	1–7	Gutiérrez (6–3)	**Stroman** (7–10)	—	**Citi Field** (23,443)	55–49
105	August 2	@ Marlins	3–6	Luzardo (3–4)	**Megill** (1–1)	Floro (3)	LoanDepot Park (8,771)	55–50
106	August 3	@ Marlins	4–5	Neidert (1–1)	**Walker** (7–6)	Floro (4)	LoanDepot Park (7,682)	55–51
107	August 4	@ Marlins	5–3	**Castro** (3–3)	Bass (1–7)	**May** (4)	LoanDepot Park (9,760)	56–51
108	August 5	@ Marlins	2–4	Detwiler (2–1)	**Familia** (5–2)	Bender (2)	LoanDepot Park (9,745)	56–52
109	August 6	@ Phillies	2–4	Gibson (8–3)	**Stroman** (7–11)	Kennedy (17)	Citizens Bank Park (30,106)	56–53
110	August 7	@ Phillies	3–5	Hammer (1–0)	**Megill** (1–2)	Kennedy (18)	Citizens Bank Park (37,057)	56–54
111	August 8	@ Phillies	0–3	Wheeler (10–6)	**Walker** (7–7)	—	Citizens Bank Park (39,186)	56–55
112	August 10 (Note: game suspended in the top of the 2nd inning with the Nationals leading 3–1; game completed on July 18 before the regularly scheduled game)/11	Nationals	8–7	**May** (5–2)	Thompson (0–1)	**Díaz** (24)	**Citi Field** (N/A)	57–55
—	August 11	Nationals	Postponed (Rain, Makeup: August 12)					
113	August 12 (1)	Nationals	4–1 (7)	**Stroman** (8–11)	Nolin (0–1)	**Díaz** (25)	**Citi Field** (N/A)	58–55
114	August 12 (2)	Nationals	5–4 (7)	**Familia** (6–2)	Finnegan (4–4)	—	**Citi Field** (25,870)	59–55
115	August 13	Dodgers	5–6 (10)	Jansen (2–4)	**Familia** (6–3)	—	**Citi Field** (38,395)	59–56
116	August 14	Dodgers	1–2 (10)	Bickford (2–1)	**Díaz** (0–2)	Knebel (3)	**Citi Field** (38,669)	59–57
117	August 15	Dodgers	4–14	Scherzer (10–4)	**Carrasco** (0–1)	—	**Citi Field** (31,205)	59–58
118	August 16	@ Giants	5–7	Gausman (12–5)	**Castro** (3–4)	McGee (26)	Oracle Park (23,511)	59–59
119	August 17	@ Giants	2–3	Webb (7–3)	**Stroman** (8–12)	Leone (1)	Oracle Park (23,610)	59–60
120	August 18	@ Giants	6–2 (12)	**Familia** (7–3)	Chatwood (1–3)	—	Oracle Park (25,360)	60–60
121	August 19	@ Dodgers	1–4	Phillips (0–1)	**Walker** (7–8)	Treinen (4)	Dodger Stadium (42,133)	60–61
122	August 20	@ Dodgers	2–3	Buehler (12–3)	**Carrasco** (0–2)	Jansen (26)	Dodger Stadium (48,117)	60–62
123	August 21	@ Dodgers	3–4	Scherzer (11–4)	**Hill** (6–5)	Jansen (27)	Dodger Stadium (44,783)	60–63
124	August 22	@ Dodgers	7–2	**Stroman** (9–12)	Price (4–2)	—	Dodger Stadium (52,749)	61–63
125	August 24	Giants	0–8	Long (2–1)	**Megill** (1–3)	—	**Citi Field** (28,558)	61–64
126	August 25	Giants	2–3	Watson (5–3)	**Walker** (7–9)	McGee (29)	**Citi Field** (24,384)	61–65
127	August 26	Giants	2–3	García (5–3)	**Lugo** (3–2)	Rogers (12)	**Citi Field** (25,000)	61–66
128	August 27	Nationals	1–2	Espino (4–4)	**Hill** (6–6)	Finnegan (6)	**Citi Field** (20,276)	61–67
129	August 28	Nationals	5–3	**May** (6–2)	Harper (0–1)	**Díaz** (26)	**Citi Field** (27,870)	62–67
130	August 29	Nationals	9–4	**Megill** (2–3)	Fedde (6–9)	—	**Citi Field** (24,247)	63–67
131	August 31 (1)	Marlins	6–5	**Familia** (8–3)	Floro (0–1)	—	**Citi Field** (8,199)	64–67
132	August 31 (2)	Marlins	3–1 (7)	**Loup** (4–0)	Cabrera (0–1)	**Díaz** (27)	**Citi Field** (18,101)	65–67

September/October: 12–18 (Home: 7–7; Away: 5–11)

#	Date	Opponent	Score	Win	Loss	Save	Location (Attendance)	Record
–	September 1	Marlins	Postponed (Rain, Makeup: September 28)					
133	September 2	Marlins	4–3	**Familia** (9–3)	Alcántara (8–13)	**Díaz** (28)	**Citi Field** (23,737)	66–67
134	September 3	@ Nationals	6–2 (10)	**Díaz** (5–4)	Voth (3–1)	—	Nationals Park (26,779)	67–67
135	September 4 (1)	@ Nationals	11–9 (9)	**May** (7–2)	Finnegan (4–6)	**Hembree** (9)	Nationals Park (13,916)	68–67
136	September 4 (2)	@ Nationals	3–4 (7)	Rogers (1–0)	**Megill** (2–4)	Finnegan (7)	Nationals Park (22,420)	68–68
137	September 5	@ Nationals	13–6	**Loup** (5–0)	Machado (1–2)	—	Nationals Park (22,162)	69–68
138	September 6	@ Nationals	3–4	Finnegan (5–6)	**Díaz** (5–5)	—	Nationals Park (17,623)	69–69
139	September 7	@ Marlins	9–4	**Carrasco** (1–2)	Campbell (1–3)	—	LoanDepot Park (5,848)	70–69
140	September 8	@ Marlins	1–2 (10)	Bender (3–2)	**Díaz** (5–6)	—	LoanDepot Park (6,378)	70–70
141	September 9	@ Marlins	2–3	Bleier (3–2)	**Familia** (9–4)	Floro (9)	LoanDepot Park (8,075)	70–71
142	September 10	Yankees	10–3	**Megill** (3–4)	Montgomery (5–6)	—	**Citi Field** (37,288)	71–71
143	September 11	Yankees	7–8	Holmes (7–3)	**May** (7–3)	Chapman (26)	**Citi Field** (43,144)	71–72
144	September 12	Yankees	7–6	**Lugo** (4–2)	Green (7–7)	**Díaz** (29)	**Citi Field** (33,805)	72–72
145	September 13	Cardinals	0–7	Wainwright (16–7)	**Hill** (6–7)	—	**Citi Field** (19,057)	72–73
146	September 14	Cardinals	6–7 (11)	Reyes (8–8)	**Reed** (0–1)	Kim (1)	**Citi Field** (21,825)	72–74
147	September 15	Cardinals	4–11	Lester (6–6)	**Megill** (3–5)	—	**Citi Field** (21,001)	72–75
148	September 17	Phillies	3–4	Wheeler (14–9)	**Walker** (7–10)	Kennedy (23)	**Citi Field** (26,967)	72–76
149	September 18	Phillies	3–5	Nola (8–8)	**Carrasco** (1–3)	Kennedy (24)	**Citi Field** (33,442)	72–77
150	September 19	Phillies	3–2	**Loup** (6–0)	Gibson (10–8)	**Díaz** (30)	**Citi Field** (24,832)	73–77
151	September 21	@ Red Sox	3–6	Brasier (1–1)	**Stroman** (9–13)	—	Fenway Park (32,146)	73–78
152	September 22	@ Red Sox	5–12	Sale (5–0)	**Walker** (7–11)	—	Fenway Park (30,254)	73–79
153	September 24	@ Brewers	1–5	Lauer (7–5)	**Megill** (3–6)	—	American Family Field (27,452)	73–80
154	September 25	@ Brewers	1–2	Burnes (11–4)	**Hill** (6–8)	Hader (34)	American Family Field (35,388)	73–81
155	September 26	@ Brewers	4–8	Peralta (10–5)	**Carrasco** (1–4)	—	American Family Field (43,430)	73–82
156	September 28 (1)	Marlins	5–2 (7)	**Stroman** (10–13)	Thompson (2–7)	**Díaz** (31)	**Citi Field** (N/A)	74–82
157	September 28 (2)	Marlins	2–1 (9)	**Hand** (6–7)	Bass (3–9)	—	**Citi Field** (20,647)	75–82
158	September 29	Marlins	2–3	Okert (3–1)	**Lugo** (4–3)	Floro (13)	**Citi Field** (22,610)	75–83
159	September 30	Marlins	12–3	**Hill** (7–8)	Guenther (0–1)	—	**Citi Field** (24,312)	76–83
160	October 1	@ Braves	4–3	**Megill** (4–6)	Ynoa (4–6)	**Díaz** (32)	Truist Park (32,659)	77–83
161	October 2	@ Braves	5–6	Smyly (11–4)	**Carrasco** (1–5)	Webb (1)	Truist Park (37,616)	77–84
162	October 3	@ Braves	0–5	Strider (1–0)	**Syndergaard** (0–1)	—	Truist Park (33,202)	77–85

== Roster ==
2021 New York Mets
Roster
Pitchers: 77 Anthony Banda; 40 Jacob Barnes; 68 Dellin Betances; 71 Akeem Bostick; 59 Carlos Carrasco; 50 Miguel Castro; 48 Jacob deGrom; 39 Edwin Díaz; 64 Yennsy Díaz; 43 Jerad Eickhoff; 27 Jeurys Familia; 44 Robert Gsellman; 52 Brad Hand; 40 Geoff Hartlieb; 53 Heath Hembree; 35 Trevor Hildenberger; 21 Rich Hill; 29 Tommy Hunter; 32 Aaron Loup; 47 Joey Lucchesi; 67 Seth Lugo; 65 Trevor May; 38 Tylor Megill; 85 Stephen Nogosek; 55 Corey Oswalt; 23 David Peterson; 52,72 Jake Reed; 61 Sean Reid-Foley; 62 Drew Smith; 89 Robert Stock; 0 Marcus Stroman; 34 Noah Syndergaard; 63 Thomas Szapucki; 46 Stephen Tarpley; 52 Nick Tropeano; 99 Taijuan Walker; 29 Trevor Williams; 45 Jordan Yamamoto	Catchers: 76 Patrick Mazeika; 33 James McCann; 3 Tomás Nido; 77 Chance Sisco; Infielders: 20 Pete Alonso; 23 Javier Báez; 73 Travis Blankenhorn; 28 J. D. Davis; 13 Luis Guillorme; 12 Francisco Lindor; 6 Jeff McNeil; 18 José Peraza; 72 Wilfredo Tovar; 1 Jonathan Villar	Outfielders: 4 Albert Almora Jr.; 30 Michael Conforto; 35 Brandon Drury; 81 Johneshwy Fargas; 86 Jake Hager; 26 Khalil Lee; 15 Cameron Maybin; 60 Billy McKinney; 9 Brandon Nimmo; 11 Kevin Pillar; 2 Dominic Smith; 70 Mason Williams	Manager: 19 Luis Rojas; Coaches: 49 Jeremy Accardo (assistant pitching); 25 Ricky Bones (bullpen); 10 Gary DiSarcina (third base/infield); 80 Rafael Fernandez (BP pitcher); 93 Jeremy Hefner (pitching); 54 Kevin Howard (assistant hitting); 58 Dave Jauss (bench); 78 Eric Langill (bullpen catcher); 79 Ricky Meinhold (assistant pitching); 56 Hugh Quattlebaum (hitting); 57 Dave Racaniello (bullpen catcher); 22 Brian Schneider (catching/field coordinator); 51 Tony Tarasco (first base)

== Player stats ==
=== Batting ===
Note: G = Games played; AB = At bats; R = Runs; H = Hits; 2B = Doubles; 3B = Triples; HR = Home runs; RBI = Runs batted in; SB = Stolen bases; BB = Walks; AVG = Batting average; SLG = Slugging average

Player	G	AB	R	H	2B	3B	HR	RBI	SB	BB	AVG	SLG
Pete Alonso	152	561	81	147	27	3	37	94	3	60	.262	.519
Jonathan Villar	142	454	63	113	18	2	18	42	14	46	.249	.416
Francisco Lindor	125	452	73	104	16	3	20	63	10	58	.230	.412
Dominic Smith	145	446	43	109	20	0	11	58	2	32	.244	.363
Michael Conforto	125	406	52	94	20	0	14	55	1	59	.232	.384
Jeff McNeil	120	386	48	97	19	1	7	35	3	29	.251	.360
James McCann	121	375	29	87	12	1	10	46	1	32	.232	.349
Brandon Nimmo	92	325	51	95	17	3	8	28	5	54	.292	.437
Kevin Pillar	124	325	40	75	11	2	15	47	4	11	.231	.415
J. D. Davis	73	179	18	51	12	0	5	23	1	24	.285	.436
Javier Báez	47	167	32	50	9	0	9	22	5	13	.299	.515
Tomás Nido	58	153	16	34	5	1	3	13	1	5	.222	.327
José Peraza	64	142	21	29	7	0	6	20	1	9	.204	.380
Luis Guillorme	69	132	13	35	3	0	1	5	0	23	.265	.311
Billy McKinney	39	91	15	20	6	1	5	14	1	11	.220	.473
Brandon Drury	51	84	7	23	5	0	4	14	0	3	.274	.476
Patrick Mazeika	37	79	6	15	3	0	1	6	0	4	.190	.266
Albert Almora	47	52	3	6	3	0	0	0	0	2	.115	.173
Mason Williams	17	33	3	7	1	0	1	1	0	4	.212	.333
Cameron Maybin	9	28	2	1	0	0	0	0	1	3	.036	.036
Travis Blankenhorn	23	23	3	4	2	0	1	4	0	1	.174	.391
Johneshwy Fargas	7	21	1	6	3	1	0	3	0	0	.286	.524
Khalil Lee	11	18	2	1	1	0	0	1	0	0	.056	.111
Wilfredo Tovar	6	11	0	2	0	0	0	1	0	1	.182	.182
Chance Sisco	5	9	1	1	1	0	0	1	0	1	.111	.222
Jake Hager	5	8	1	1	0	0	0	0	0	0	.125	.125
Pitcher totals	162	250	12	36	7	0	0	8	1	10	.144	.172
Team totals	162	5210	636	1243	228	18	176	604	54	495	.239	.391

=== Pitching ===
Note: W = Wins; L = Losses; ERA = Earned run average; G = Games pitched; GS = Games started; SV = Saves; IP = Innings pitched; H = Hits allowed; R = Runs allowed; ER = Earned runs allowed; BB = Walks allowed; SO = Strikeouts

Player	W	L	ERA	G	GS	SV	IP	H	R	ER	BB	SO
Marcus Stroman	10	13	3.02	33	33	0	179.0	161	70	60	44	158
Taijuan Walker	7	11	4.47	30	29	0	159.0	133	84	79	55	146
Jacob deGrom	7	2	1.08	15	15	0	92.0	40	14	11	11	146
Tylor Megill	4	6	4.52	18	18	0	89.2	88	46	45	27	99
Miguel Castro	3	4	3.45	69	2	0	70.1	48	30	27	43	77
David Peterson	2	6	5.54	15	15	0	66.2	64	44	41	29	69
Rich Hill	1	4	3.84	13	12	0	63.1	62	29	27	19	59
Edwin Díaz	5	6	3.45	63	0	32	62.2	43	27	24	23	89
Trevor May	7	3	3.59	68	0	4	62.2	55	29	25	24	83
Jeurys Familia	9	4	3.94	65	0	1	59.1	57	31	26	27	72
Aaron Loup	6	0	0.95	65	2	0	56.2	37	9	6	16	57
Carlos Carrasco	1	5	6.04	12	12	0	53.2	59	39	36	18	50
Seth Lugo	4	3	3.50	46	0	1	46.1	41	18	18	19	55
Drew Smith	3	1	2.40	31	1	0	41.1	28	13	11	16	41
Joey Lucchesi	1	4	4.46	11	8	0	38.1	34	20	19	11	41
Trevor Williams	0	0	3.06	10	3	0	32.1	37	14	11	9	29
Robert Gsellman	0	1	3.77	17	1	0	28.2	27	14	12	7	17
Yennsy Díaz	0	2	5.40	20	0	0	25.0	25	16	15	12	21
Sean Reid-Foley	2	1	5.23	12	0	0	20.2	22	15	12	9	26
Jerad Eickhoff	0	2	8.69	5	4	0	19.2	30	24	19	10	13
Jacob Barnes	1	1	6.27	19	0	2	18.2	19	13	13	5	18
Heath Hembree	0	0	3.45	15	0	1	15.2	13	6	6	5	15
Brad Hand	1	0	2.70	16	0	0	13.1	12	7	4	5	14
Corey Oswalt	1	1	3.48	3	1	0	10.1	12	4	4	2	10
Tommy Hunter	0	0	0.00	4	1	0	8.0	4	0	0	3	6
Anthony Banda	1	0	7.36	5	0	0	7.1	14	8	6	1	7
Jordan Yamamoto	1	1	4.05	2	1	0	6.2	10	6	3	2	3
Robert Stock	0	1	5.40	2	2	0	5.0	6	3	3	3	6
Jake Reed	0	1	3.86	4	0	0	4.2	5	3	2	0	5
Geoff Hartlieb	0	0	14.54	3	0	0	4.1	7	7	7	6	5
Thomas Szapucki	0	0	14.73	1	0	0	3.2	7	6	6	3	4
Stephen Nogosek	0	1	6.00	1	0	0	3.0	3	2	2	0	5
Trevor Hildenberger	0	0	15.43	2	0	0	2.1	3	4	4	3	4
Noah Syndergaard	0	1	9.00	2	2	0	2.0	3	2	2	0	2
Nick Tropeano	0	0	4.50	1	0	0	2.0	4	1	1	1	0
Dellin Betances	0	0	9.00	1	0	0	1.0	0	1	1	1	1
Luis Guillorme	0	0	18.00	1	0	0	1.0	3	2	2	1	0
Albert Almora	0	0	27.00	1	0	0	1.0	1	3	3	1	0
Akeem Bostick	0	0	0.00	1	0	0	1.0	0	0	0	1	0
Brandon Drury	0	0	27.00	1	0	0	0.2	3	2	2	1	0
Kevin Pillar	0	0	0.00	1	0	0	0.1	0	0	0	0	0
Stephen Tarpley	0	0	inf	1	0	0	0.0	1	2	2	2	0
Team totals	77	85	3.90	162	162	41	1379.1	1221	668	597	475	1453

== Farm system ==
Level	Team	League	Manager
AAA	Syracuse Mets	Triple-A East	Chad Kreuter
AA	Binghamton Rumble Ponies	Double-A Northeast	Lorenzo Bundy
High-A	Brooklyn Cyclones	High-A East	Ed Blankmeyer
Low-A	St. Lucie Mets	Low-A Southeast	Reid Brignac
Rookie	FCL Mets	Florida Complex League	Chris Newell
Rookie	DSL Mets 1	Dominican Summer League	Manny Martinez
Rookie	DSL Mets 2	Dominican Summer League	Yucary De La Cruz
