= Taylor Widener =

American baseball player (born 1994)

- Pitcher
- Born: October 24, 1994 (age 32); Aiken, South Carolina, U.S.
- Batted: Left Threw: Right

Professional debut
- MLB: July 25, 2020, for the Arizona Diamondbacks
- KBO: May 30, 2023, for the NC Dinos

Last appearance
- MLB: October 4, 2022, for the Arizona Diamondbacks
- KBO: October 14, 2023, for the Samsung Lions

MLB statistics
- Win–loss record: 2–3
- Earned run average: 4.26
- Strikeouts: 109

KBO statistics
- Win–loss record: 7–5
- Earned run average: 4.54
- Strikeouts: 99
- Stats at Baseball Reference

Teams
- Arizona Diamondbacks (2020–2022); NC Dinos (2023); Samsung Lions (2023)

Taylor Browning Widener (born October 24, 1994) is an American former professional baseball pitcher. He played in Major League Baseball (MLB) for the Arizona Diamondbacks and in the KBO League for the NC Dinos and Samsung Lions.

== Career ==
=== Amateur career ===
Widener attended South Aiken High School in Aiken, South Carolina and played college baseball at the University of South Carolina. He was both a starter and relief pitcher at South Carolina. After his junior season, he was drafted by the New York Yankees in the 12th round of the 2016 Major League Baseball draft.

=== New York Yankees ===
Widener made his professional debut with the Staten Island Yankees and was promoted to the Charleston RiverDogs after not allowing a run over 15 1/3 innings with Staten Island. He finished 2016 with a combined 3–0 record and a 0.47 ERA in 38 1/3 innings pitched between both clubs. Widener spent 2017 with the Tampa Yankees where he posted a 7–8 record with a 3.39 ERA in 27 starts.

=== Arizona Diamondbacks ===
On February 18, 2018, the Yankees sent Widener to the Arizona Diamondbacks in a three-team trade, in which the Yankees acquired Brandon Drury from the Diamondbacks, the Diamondbacks acquired Steven Souza from the Tampa Bay Rays, and the Rays acquired Nick Solak from the Yankees and Anthony Banda and two PTBNL (Colin Poche and Sam McWilliams) from the Diamondbacks. Widener spent 2018 with the Jackson Generals, pitching to a 5–8 record with a 2.75 ERA in 26 games (25 starts). He was a Southern League Mid-Season All-Star and named to Baseball America's Double-A All-Star team. The Diamondbacks named him their Pitcher of the Year. Before the 2019 season, MLB.com ranked him as the third best prospect in the Diamondbacks system. He spent the year with the Triple-A Reno Aces, going 6–7 with an 8.10 ERA over 23 starts, striking out 109 over 100 innings.

Widener was added to the Diamondbacks 40–man roster following the 2019 season. Following the delay of the 2020 season due to the COVID-19 pandemic, he was included on the 30-man roster when the season started in July. Widener made his major league debut on July 25 against the San Diego Padres, pitching 1 2/3 scoreless innings. On August 31, Widener was placed on the 10-day injured list with a strained rib cage. He returned from the injury on September 20. On the season, he was 0–1 in 12 games with 22 strikeouts in 20 innings, he also allowed 12 walks.

Widener started the 2021 season in the Diamondbacks starting rotation. On April 28, he was placed on the 10-day injured list with a groin strain. He returned to the team on May 23, but was put back on the injured list with another groin strain just two days later. He was reinstated on July 9, then optioned the following day before returning on July 20. He missed time in August with flu-like symptoms. After pitching to a 4.28 ERA in 13 starts, Widener was moved to the bullpen in September to manage his workload. On the season, Widener made 23 appearances for Arizona, posting a 4.35 ERA with 73 strikeouts in 70 1/3 innings pitched.

Widener began the 2022 season in Triple-A after he was optioned on April 2. Widener was recalled on April 24 and sent back to the minors on May 2. He returned on June 3 but was again optioned four days later. The Diamondbacks against recalled him on August 1, then optioned him two days later, before returning on September 8. Overall, he pitched in 14 games with the big league club, recording a 3.63 ERA with 14 strikeouts in 17 1/3 innings out of the bullpen. He was designated for assignment on December 23, 2022. On January 5, 2023, Widener was sent outright to Triple-A Reno.

=== NC Dinos ===
On January 31, 2023, Widener signed a one-year contract worth $743,000 with the NC Dinos of the KBO League. In 11 starts, he registered a 4–2 record and 4.52 ERA with 57 strikeouts across 61 2/3 innings pitched. On August 4, Widener was released by the Dinos.

=== Samsung Lions ===
On August 10, 2023, Widener signed with the Samsung Lions of the KBO League. He became a free agent following the season.

=== Atlanta Braves ===
On December 11, 2023, Widener signed a minor league contract with the Atlanta Braves. In 22 appearances (11 starts) for the Triple–A Gwinnett Stripers, he posted a 3–5 record and 6.51 ERA with 59 strikeouts across 56 2/3 innings pitched. Widener was released by the Braves organization on August 1, 2024.
