= Anthony Banda =

American baseball player (born 1993)

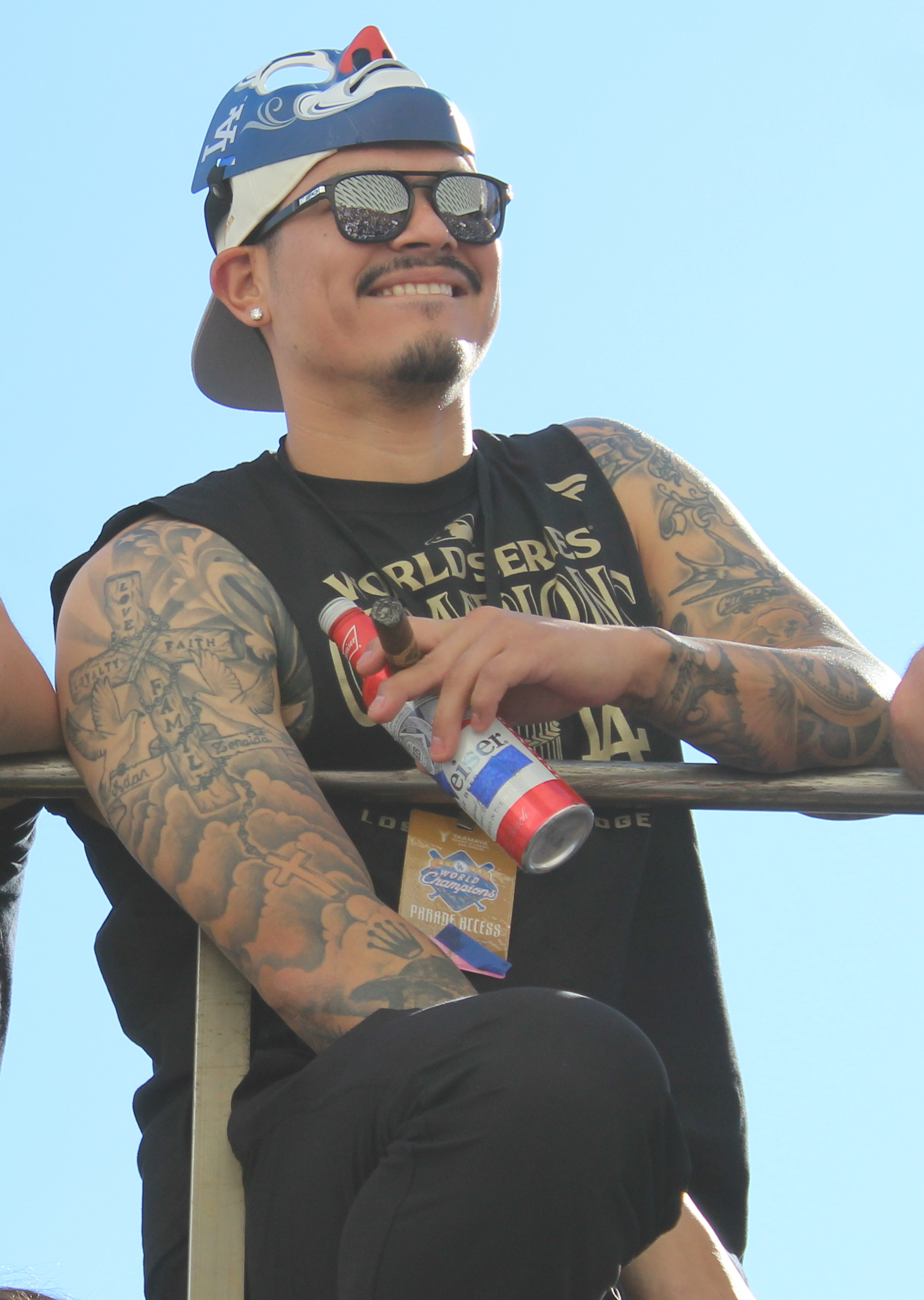
- Banda at the 2024 championship parade

Free agent
- Pitcher
- Born: August 10, 1993 (age 33); Corpus Christi, Texas, U.S.
- Bats: Left Throws: Left

MLB debut
- July 22, 2017, for the Arizona Diamondbacks

MLB statistics (through 2026 season)
- Win–loss record: 17–9
- Earned run average: 4.44
- Strikeouts: 253
- Stats at Baseball Reference

Teams
- Arizona Diamondbacks (2017); Tampa Bay Rays (2018–2020); New York Mets (2021); Pittsburgh Pirates (2021–2022); Toronto Blue Jays (2022); New York Yankees (2022); Washington Nationals (2023); Los Angeles Dodgers (2024–2025); Minnesota Twins (2026)

Career highlights and awards
- 2× World Series champion (2024, 2025)

Frank Anthony Banda (born August 10, 1993) is an American professional baseball pitcher who is a free agent. He played college baseball for San Jacinto College. The Milwaukee Brewers selected Banda in the tenth round of the 2012 MLB draft. He made his Major League Baseball (MLB) debut with the Arizona Diamondbacks in 2017 and has also played for the Tampa Bay Rays, New York Mets, Pittsburgh Pirates, Toronto Blue Jays, New York Yankees, Washington Nationals, Los Angeles Dodgers, and Minnesota Twins.

== Early life ==
Frank Anthony Banda was born on August 10, 1993, in Corpus Christi, Texas, to parents Frank and Danette Banda. He has four siblings.

== Amateur career ==
Banda attended Sinton High School in Sinton, Texas, where he played for the school's baseball team. The Arizona Diamondbacks selected Banda in the 33rd round of the 2011 Major League Baseball draft. He did not sign and attended San Jacinto College, where he had a 7–1 record with a 2.01 earned run average (ERA) and 73 strikeouts, earning National Junior College Athletic Association third-team all-American honors.

== Professional career ==
=== Milwaukee Brewers ===
The Milwaukee Brewers selected Banda in the tenth round of the 2012 Major League Baseball draft. He signed and made his professional debut that year with the Arizona League Brewers where he was 2–3 with a 5.83 ERA in 41 2/3 innings pitched.

In 2013, he played for the Helena Brewers where he pitched to a 3–4 record and 4.45 ERA in 14 starts. Banda began 2014 with the Wisconsin Timber Rattlers, making 20 appearances (14 starts) with a 6–6 record and 3.66 ERA.

=== Arizona Diamondbacks ===
On July 31, 2014, the Brewers traded Banda and Mitch Haniger to the Arizona Diamondbacks in exchange for Gerardo Parra. Arizona assigned him to the South Bend Silver Hawks, where he finished the season, making six starts with a 1.54 ERA.

Banda spent 2015 with the Lower A ball Visalia Rawhide, where he was 8–8 with a 3.32 ERA in 28 games (27 starts), with one shutout. Banda led the league with 152 strikeouts and was second in starts and third with 151 2/3 innings. He was a MiLB.com Organization All Star, and a post-season All Star. He started 2016 with the AA Mobile BayBears, and was promoted to the AAA Reno Aces in June. He was also selected to play in the All-Star Futures Game that July. In 26 starts between Mobile and Reno he pitched to a 10–6 record and 2.88 ERA, with 152 strikeouts in 150 innings. He was a mid-season Southern League All Star and a MILB.COM Organization All Star The Diamondbacks added him to their 40-man roster after the 2016 season; he started the 2017 season pitching for Reno.

Banda made his major league debut on July 22, 2017, taking the loss in a game against the Washington Nationals. He struck out the first batter he faced, Brian Goodwin and allowed four runs on seven hits in 5 2/3 innings, while striking out five in the game. He was optioned back to Reno the next day but was recalled twice more and finished the season with a 2–3 record and 5.96 ERA in 24 2/3 innings. In 22 starts (10th-most in the league) for Reno he was 8–7 with 12 wild pitches (2nd), 116 strikeouts (5th), 51 walks (7th) and a 5.39 ERA.

=== Tampa Bay Rays ===
On February 18, 2018, the Diamondbacks traded Banda to the Tampa Bay Rays in a three-team trade, in which the New York Yankees acquired Brandon Drury from Arizona, the Diamondbacks acquired Steven Souza from the Rays and Taylor Widener from the Yankees, and the Rays acquired Nick Solak from the Yankees and two players to be named later (Sam McWilliams and Colin Poche) from the Diamondbacks. Banda began the 2018 season with the Durham Bulls and made his Rays debut on May 15, against the Kansas City Royals. On June 4, he was diagnosed a torn ulnar collateral ligament which required Tommy John surgery, effectively ending his 2018 season and half of the following season. He pitched 14 2/3 innings for the Rays, allowing six earned runs.

In 2019, he made 13 rehab appearances in the minor leagues, with a 2–4 record and a 5.67 ERA. Banda returned to the Rays with a relief appearance on September 8 and pitched a total of four innings for them over three games, allowing three runs.

Banda only made four appearances in the COVID-19 shortened 2020 season. He pitched seven innings, with eight earned runs allowed and was designated for assignment on August 30.

=== San Francisco Giants ===
On August 31, 2020, Banda was traded from the Rays to the San Francisco Giants for cash considerations. On November 1, he was outrighted off of the 40-man roster and elected free agency, but quickly re-signed with the Giants on a new minor league contract. Banda was assigned to the Triple-A Sacramento River Cats to begin the 2021 season, but struggled to a 3–2 record and 6.86 ERA in 10 appearances.

=== New York Mets ===
On July 2, 2021, Banda was traded to the New York Mets in exchange for Will Toffey. He was assigned to the Triple-A Syracuse Mets, where he allowed six earned runs in 10 1/3 innings. On July 19, Banda was selected to the active roster. In five appearances for the Mets, he pitched to a 7.36 ERA with seven strikeouts. On July 31, the Mets designated Banda for assignment.

=== Pittsburgh Pirates ===
On August 2, 2021, Banda was claimed off of waivers by the Pittsburgh Pirates. He made 25 appearances for Pittsburgh down the stretch, recording a 1–2 record and 3.42 ERA with 25 strikeouts in 26 1/3 innings pitched.

In 2022, Banda pitched in 23 games for the Pirates, but struggled to a 6.41 ERA with 22 strikeouts in 19 2/3 innings of work. On June 27, he was designated for assignment.

=== Toronto Blue Jays ===
On July 2, 2022, Banda was traded to the Toronto Blue Jays for cash considerations. He pitched in seven games for the Blue Jays, allowing three runs in 6 1/3 innings. He was designated for assignment on August 2 and became a free agent August 6 after rejecting an outright assignment to the minors.

=== Seattle Mariners ===
On August 9, 2022, Banda signed a minor league contract with the Seattle Mariners and pitched four innings for the Tacoma Rainiers, allowing one earned run. On August 25 Banda opted out of his contract with the Mariners and became a free agent.

=== New York Yankees ===
On August 28, 2022, Banda signed a one-year, major league contract with New York Yankees. He was designated for assignment on September 3, after allowing three runs on two hits and five walks in 0 2/3 innings across two appearances. He cleared waivers and was sent outright to the Triple–A Scranton/Wilkes-Barre RailRiders on September 5, where he appeared in six games, allowing five earned runs in 7 1/3 innings. On October 24, Banda elected free agency.

=== Washington Nationals ===
On January 4, 2023, Banda signed a minor league deal with the Washington Nationals. On March 30, Banda had his contract selected after making the Opening Day roster and he made 10 appearances for Washington, registering a 6.43 ERA with six strikeouts in seven innings pitched. On April 30, he was designated for assignment and he cleared waivers and was sent outright to the Triple-A Rochester Red Wings on May 4. In 33 games for the Red Wings, he pitched 65 1/3 innings, made 10 starts and allowed 55 earned runs for a 9.23 ERA. On October 13, Banda elected free agency.

=== Cleveland Guardians ===
On January 30, 2024, Banda signed a minor league contract with the Cleveland Guardians. In 12 games for the Triple-A Columbus Clippers, he recorded a 2.12 ERA with 25 strikeouts across 17 innings pitched.

=== Los Angeles Dodgers ===
On May 17, 2024, the Guardians traded Banda to the Los Angeles Dodgers in exchange for cash considerations. He was added to the major league roster on May 19, and pitched in an extra-innings game against the Cincinnati Reds that same day. Banda was placed on the injured list on September 10, fracturing his left hand by hitting a solid object after a poor performance the previous day. He rejoined the roster on September 26. In 48 games for the Dodgers in 2024, he was 3–2 with a 3.08 ERA in 49 2/3 innings. Banda pitched eight innings over 10 games for the Dodgers in the postseason, allowing only one run on six hits as the Dodgers won the 2024 World Series.

In the 2025 season, Banda pitched in a team high 71 games, and finished with a 5–1 record and 3.18 ERA in 65 innings. In the postseason, he pitched one scoreless inning in the 2025 NLDS, 1 2/3 scoreless innings in the 2025 NLCS and allowed six runs on six hits (including two home runs) and one walk in three innings of the 2025 World Series. The Dodgers won the series in seven games for the championship. On February 6, 2026, the Dodgers designated Banda for assignment.

=== Minnesota Twins ===
On February 12, 2026, the Dodgers traded Banda to the Minnesota Twins in exchange for international pool salary space. In 39 appearances for Minnesota, he logged a 2–0 record and 4.46 ERA with 33 strikeouts and two saves across 34 1/3 innings pitched. On June 29, it was announced that Banda would miss months after suffering a significant lat strain. On July 9, Banda underwent season–ending surgery to address the injury. On October 29, Banda was removed from the 40–man roster and sent outright to the Triple–A St. Paul Saints, but elected free agency rather than accepting the assignment.

== Personal life ==
Banda has a son who was born in December 2018. On November 2, 2022, Anthony Banda's brother, Mathew Banda, a 27-year-old Navy veteran, and 37-year-old Betsy Mandujano were killed by an intoxicated driver driving the wrong way on the Corpus Christi Harbor Bridge.
