= Brandon Drury =

American baseball player (born 1992)

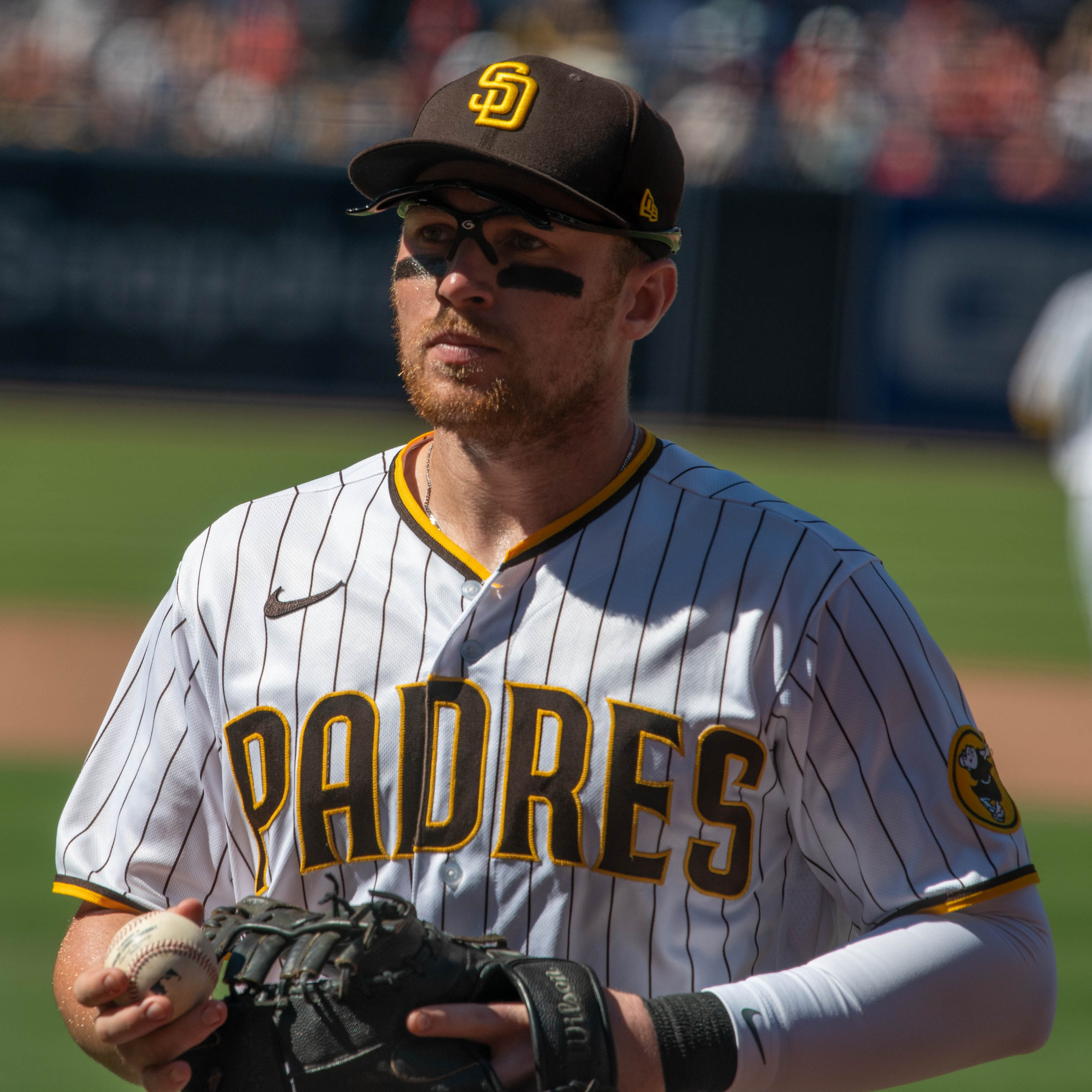
- Drury with the San Diego Padres in 2022

Free agent
- Utility player
- Born: August 21, 1992 (age 34); Grants Pass, Oregon, U.S.
- Bats: Right Throws: Right

MLB debut
- September 1, 2015, for the Arizona Diamondbacks

MLB statistics (through 2024 season)
- Batting average: .245
- Home runs: 109
- Runs batted in: 375
- Stats at Baseball Reference

Teams
- Arizona Diamondbacks (2015–2017); New York Yankees (2018); Toronto Blue Jays (2018–2020); New York Mets (2021); Cincinnati Reds (2022); San Diego Padres (2022); Los Angeles Angels (2023–2024)

Career highlights and awards
- Silver Slugger Award (2022)

Brandon Shane Drury (born August 21, 1992) is an American professional baseball utility player who is a free agent. He has previously played in Major League Baseball (MLB) for the Arizona Diamondbacks, New York Yankees, Toronto Blue Jays, New York Mets, Cincinnati Reds, San Diego Padres, and Los Angeles Angels. He was drafted by the Atlanta Braves in 2010 and made his MLB debut with the Diamondbacks in 2015.

== Career ==
=== Amateur career ===
Drury attended Grants Pass High School in Grants Pass, Oregon, where he played shortstop for the school's baseball team. He committed to play college baseball at Oregon State University.

=== Atlanta Braves ===
The Atlanta Braves selected Drury in the 13th round of the 2010 Major League Baseball draft. He signed and made his professional debut for the Gulf Coast Braves. He finished the year hitting .198/.248/.292 with three home runs over 192 at bats. In 2011, he played for the Danville Braves of the rookie-level Appalachian League. In 63 games, he hit .347/.367/.525 with eight home runs in 265 at-bats. He was named the most valuable player of the Appalachian League along with Eddie Rosario. In 2012, while playing for the Rome Braves of the Single-A South Atlantic League, he hit only .229/.270/.333 with six home runs in 445 at-bats.

=== Arizona Diamondbacks ===
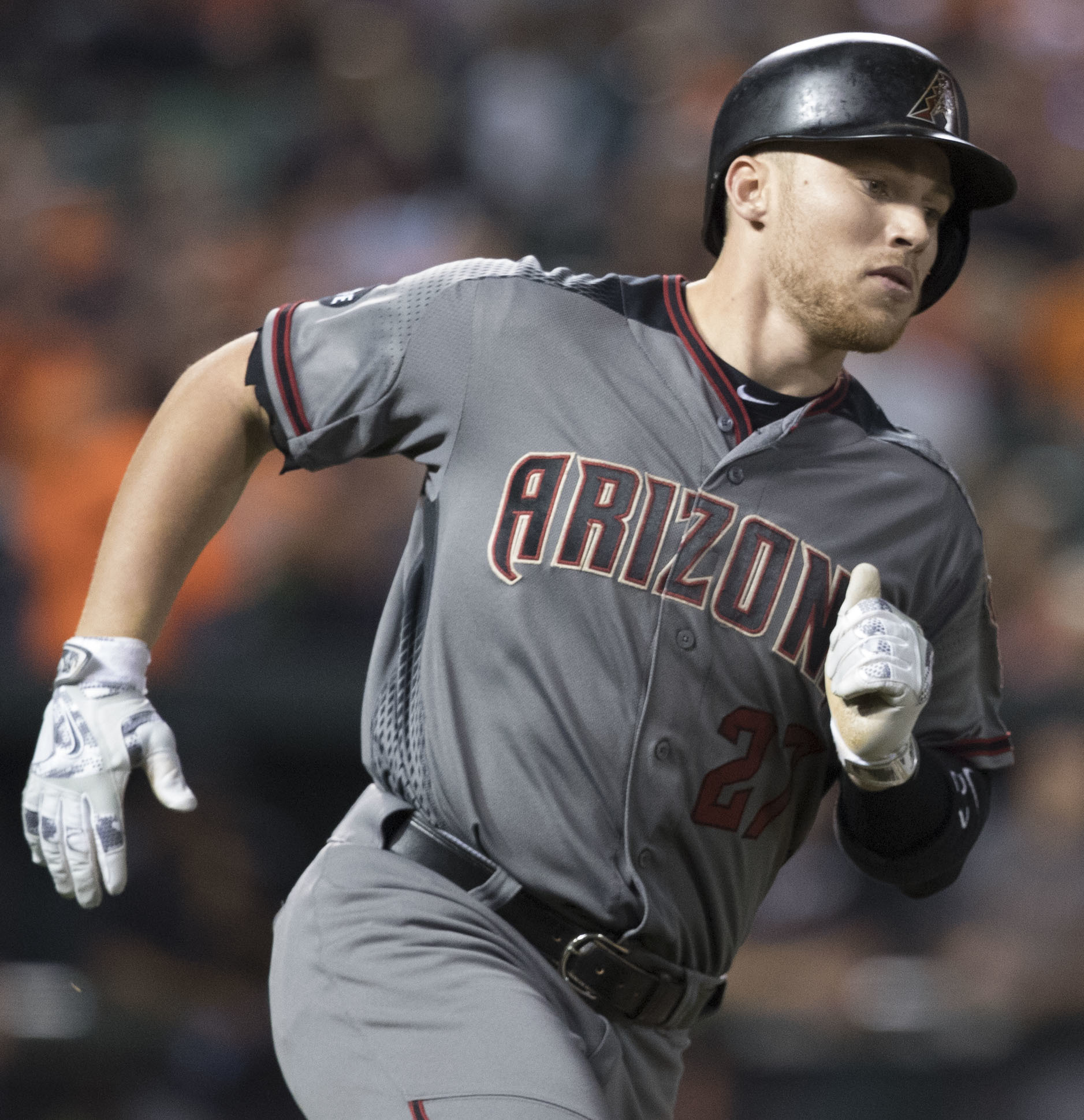
Drury with the Arizona Diamondbacks in 2016

On January 24, 2013, the Braves traded Drury, along with Martín Prado, Randall Delgado, Zeke Spruill, and Nick Ahmed to the Arizona Diamondbacks for Justin Upton and Chris Johnson. He played his first season in the Diamondbacks organization with the South Bend Silver Hawks. In 134 games, he hit .302/.362/.500 with 15 home runs. He started the 2014 season for the Visalia Rawhide of the High-A California League, and in August was promoted to the Mobile BayBears of the Double-A Southern League. He had a .299 batting average, 23 home runs and 95 RBI. After the season, Drury was sent to the Arizona Fall League, where he played for the Salt River Rafters.

In 2015, the Diamondbacks invited Drury to spring training and assigned him to Mobile to begin the season. On June 23, he was promoted to the Reno Aces of the Triple-A Pacific Coast League. The Diamondbacks called Drury up to the major leagues on September 1, 2015, and he made his debut that day. Drury collected his first major league hit, a single, off Colorado Rockies pitcher Jon Gray. Drury hit his first home run on September 22, off Los Angeles Dodgers pitcher Adam Liberatore.

Due to his strong offensive performance, Drury was mentioned as a possible backup outfielder during spring training in 2016. He became one of the last players to make the Diamondbacks 2016 Opening Day roster. The Diamondbacks occasionally started Drury in the outfield as well as second and third base to keep his bat in the lineup. Drury was optioned to Reno to clear a roster spot for Shelby Miller on June 19, despite hitting .275/.313/.456 up to that point in the season. The Diamondbacks recalled Drury on June 24, a day after outfielder Socrates Brito had fractured a toe on his right foot.

=== New York Yankees ===
On February 20, 2018, the Diamondbacks traded Drury to the New York Yankees in a three-team trade, where they acquired Steven Souza from the Tampa Bay Rays and Taylor Widener from the Yankees, while the Rays also acquired Nick Solak from the Yankees and Anthony Banda and two players to be named later (Colin Poche and Sam McWilliams) from the Diamondbacks.

On April 6, 2018, Drury left the game due to blurred vision and migraines. The next day, Drury was placed on the 10-day disabled list due to severe migraines. On May 14, he was activated from the disabled list, and optioned to Triple-A Scranton/Wilkes Barre.

=== Toronto Blue Jays ===
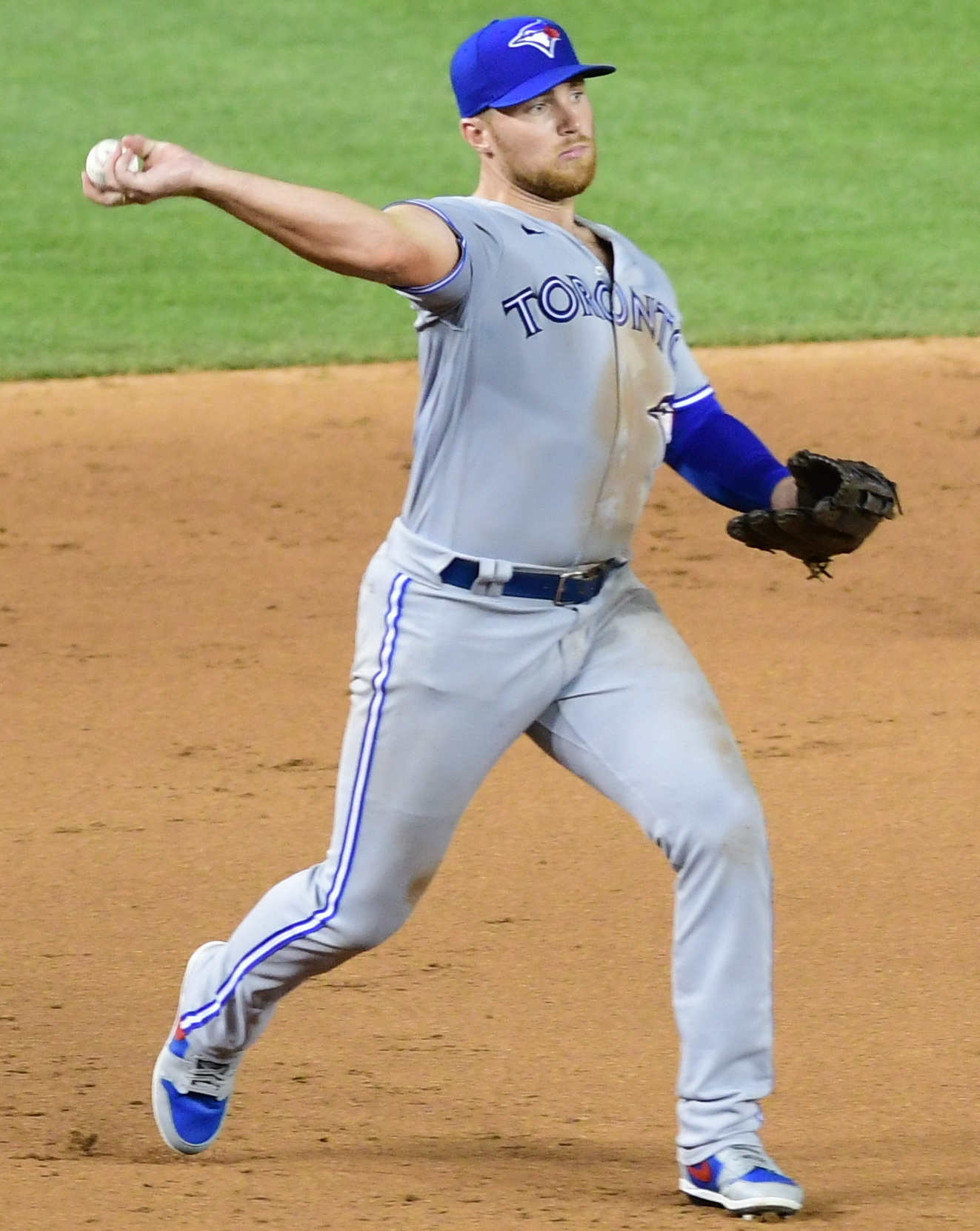
Drury with the Toronto Blue Jays in 2020

On July 26, 2018, the Yankees traded Drury and Billy McKinney to the Toronto Blue Jays for J. A. Happ. Drury was placed on the disabled list on August 7 with a broken left hand, eight games into his tenure with the Blue Jays. In 2019, Drury played the majority of the season, appearing at multiple positions, despite having a second straight season in which he struggled offensively. Overall, Drury hit .218 with 15 home runs and 41 runs batted in. On September 1, 2020, Drury was designated for assignment by the Blue Jays. To that point in the season, Drury had hit .152/.184/.174 over 49 plate appearances. He was outrighted on September 4. Drury elected free agency on October 6, 2020.

=== New York Mets ===
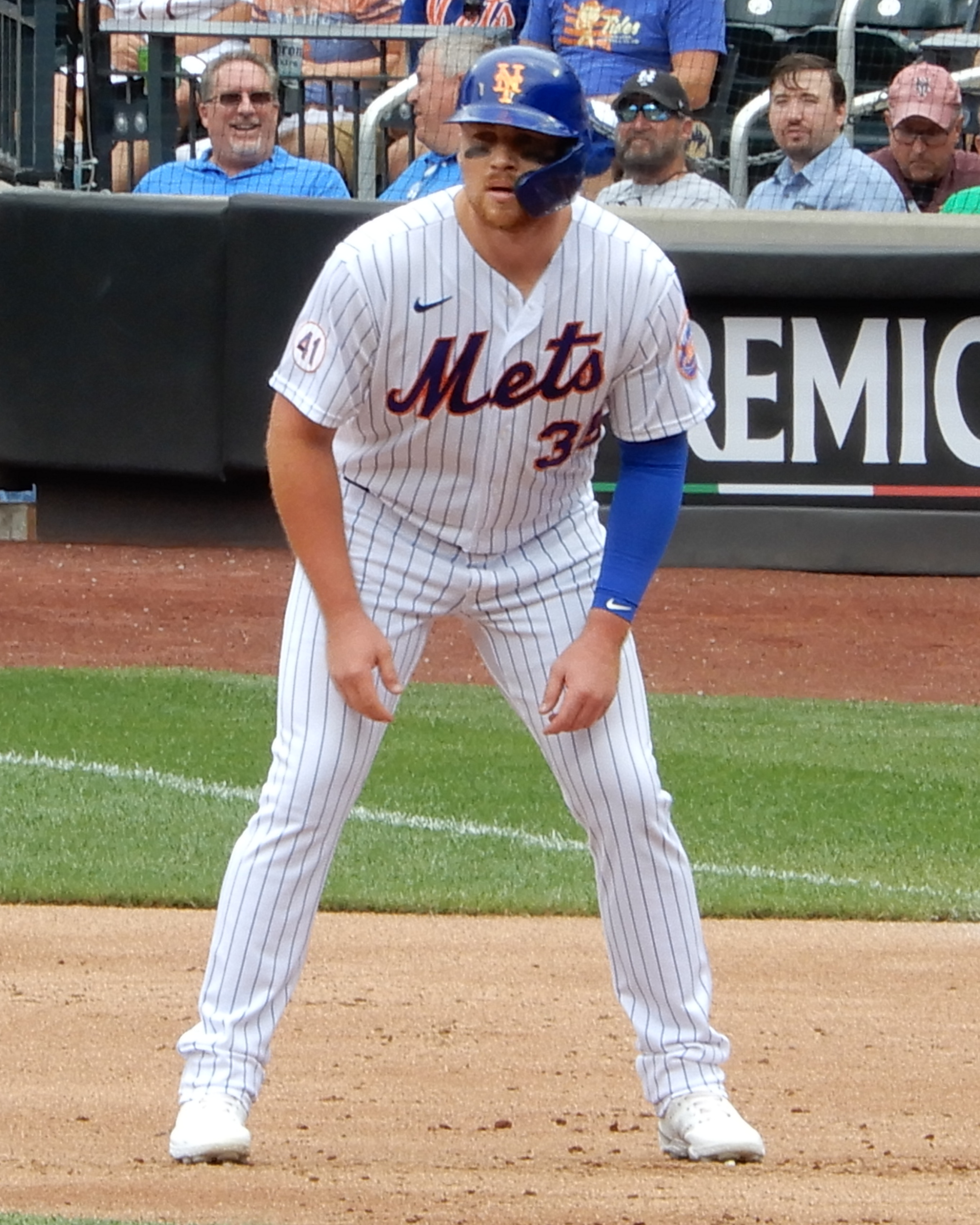
Drury with the Mets in 2021

On January 5, 2021, Drury signed a minor league contract with the New York Mets organization. He began the 2021 season with the Syracuse Mets of Triple-A East. On May 21, the Mets selected Drury to their active roster. He hit his first home run as a Met on May 24, a ninth inning pinch hit home run off Austin Gomber of the Colorado Rockies. He batted .274 with four home runs for the Mets before he was designated for assignment on October 2. On October 14, Drury elected free agency.

=== Cincinnati Reds ===
On March 21, 2022, Drury signed a minor league contract with the Cincinnati Reds. On April 5, it was announced that Drury had made the Reds’ Opening Day roster. Drury ended up as the starting third baseman and had a breakout year, with him being considered the Reds best offensive player of the first half, and some arguing that he deserved to be an All-Star. In 92 games with the Reds, Drury hit .274/.335/.520 with 20 home runs and 59 RBI.

=== San Diego Padres ===
On August 2, 2022, the Reds traded Drury to the San Diego Padres for Victor Acosta. He hit a grand slam on the first pitch that he saw as a Padre on August 3. In 46 games with the Padres, Drury hit .238/.290/.435 with 8 home runs and 28 RBI.

=== Los Angeles Angels ===
On December 22, 2022, Drury signed a two year, $17 million contract with the Los Angeles Angels. In the first season of the contract in 2023, Drury played in 125 games, hitting .262/.306/.497 with 26 home runs and 83 RBI.

Drury made 97 appearances for the Angels during the 2024 campaign, slashing .169/.242/.228 with four home runs and 15 RBI.

=== Chicago White Sox ===
On February 7, 2025, Drury signed a minor league contract with the Chicago White Sox. He was released prior to the start of the season on March 23. The release came after Drury suffered a thumb fracture, which would have sidelined him to begin the year. On April 8, Drury re-signed with Chicago on a new minor league contract. In 10 appearances for the Triple-A Charlotte Knights, he batted .179/.319/.282 with one home run and three RBI. Drury was released by the White Sox organization on May 15.

=== Los Angeles Angels (second stint) ===
On July 1, 2025, Drury signed a minor league contract with the Los Angeles Angels. In 36 appearances for the Triple-A Salt Lake Bees, he batted .233/.338/.346 with two home runs and 13 RBI. Drury elected free agency following the season on November 6.

=== Kansas City Royals ===
On February 4, 2026, Drury signed a minor league contract with the Kansas City Royals. He was assigned to their Triple–A affiliate, the Omaha Storm Chasers, to begin the season. In 53 appearances for the Storm Chasers, he batted .226/.354/.362 with five home runs and 29 RBI. On September 7, Drury was released by the Royals.
