= Robert Stock =

American baseball player (born 1989)

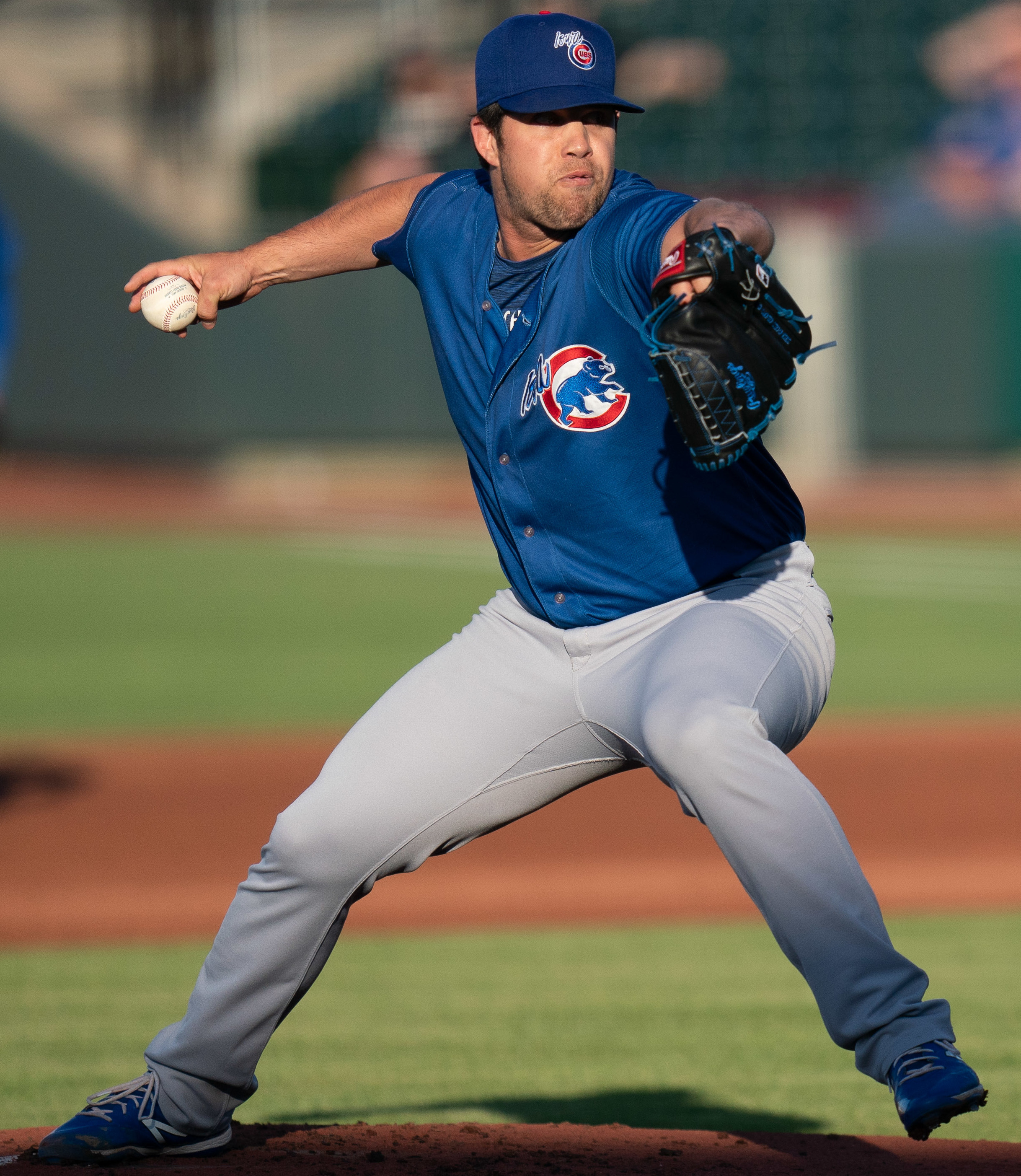
- Stock with the Iowa Cubs in 2021

New York Mets – No. 89
- Pitcher
- Born: November 21, 1989 (age 36); Bellevue, Washington, U.S.
- Bats: Left Throws: Right

Professional debut
- MLB: June 24, 2018, for the San Diego Padres
- KBO: April 2, 2022, for the Doosan Bears

MLB statistics (through 2026 season)
- Win–loss record: 3–7
- Earned run average: 5.20
- Strikeouts: 106

KBO statistics (through 2022 season)
- Win–loss record: 9–10
- Earned run average: 3.60
- Strikeouts: 138
- Stats at Baseball Reference

Teams
- San Diego Padres (2018–2019); Boston Red Sox (2020); Chicago Cubs (2021); New York Mets (2021); Doosan Bears (2022); Boston Red Sox (2025); New York Mets (2026–present)

Robert Anthony Stock (born November 21, 1989) is an American professional baseball pitcher for the New York Mets of Major League Baseball (MLB). He has previously played in MLB for the San Diego Padres, Boston Red Sox, and Chicago Cubs, and in the KBO League for the Doosan Bears. He pitched for the Israeli national baseball team in the 2023 World Baseball Classic.

The St. Louis Cardinals selected Stock in the second round of the 2009 MLB draft as a catcher. After transitioning into a pitcher, Stock made his MLB debut in 2018 with the Padres. After playing for San Diego in 2019, he played for the Red Sox in 2020 and the Cubs and Mets in 2021, before joining Doosan in the 2022 season. Listed at 6 feet 1 inch (1.85 m) and 260 pounds (120 kg), he throws right-handed and bats left-handed.

== Early life ==
Stock was born in Bellevue, Washington, and grew up in Agoura Hills and Westlake Village, California. He is Jewish and grew up attending temple and Hebrew school. His parents are Gregg, an engineer, and Randi Stock. He has two brothers, Richard, who also played professional baseball, and Jacob, and two sisters, Sasha and Sabina.

As a 12-year-old, Stock threw an 80-mile-per-hour (130 km/h) fastball. In 2002, he threw a no-hitter to lead Agoura to an 11–1 victory over Taiwan in the Pony Baseball's Bronco League World Series (ages 11–12) championship game. Baseball America rated him as the best baseball player of his age in the country when he was 13 years old in 2003, repeating that ranking again in 2004 and 2005. Stock played for the United States junior national baseball team in 2004, as the team's youngest player ever and number one pitcher, and 2005.

== Amateur career ==
Stock attended Agoura High School in Agoura Hills and played for the school's baseball team as a cleanup-hitting catcher and pitcher. In 2003, his sophomore season, he had a .405 batting average with eight home runs, and as a pitcher, he had a 5–1 win–loss record with a 2.85 earned run average (ERA). as batters hit .190 against him. In 2004, his junior year, he batted .456 with six home runs and 25 runs batted in (RBIs) and caught 70 percent of would-be base stealers. He also had a 5–3 win–loss record and a 2.69 earned run average (ERA) as a pitcher, as his fastball reached 95 miles per hour (153 km/h) and batters hit .218 against him. He was named Baseball America's 2005 Youth Player of the Year at 15 years of age (the first time the award was won by a high school underclassman), Los Angeles Times Player of the Year, and All-California Interscholastic Federation (CIF) First Team as he developed a reputation for hitting 400-foot home runs with wood bats. He graduated from Agoura a year early, an honor student with a 3.8 GPA and a 1410 SAT score.

Stock passed up what some felt was a certain first-round selection in the 2007 MLB draft, to instead enroll a year early at the age of 16, at the University of Southern California (USC) in its Resident Honors Program, which allows 30 high school students to enroll a year early. He was the first athlete in USC history to participate in Resident Honors. He began college while he was still wearing braces. He played college baseball for the USC Trojans as a catcher and a pitcher. In three years at USC, Stock had a .263 career batting average, threw out 33.8% of baserunners, and as a pitcher, working as both a starter and closer, was 8–7 with a 3.38 ERA and nine saves as opponents batted .228 against him. In the summers of 2007 and 2008 he played for the Cotuit Kettleers of the Cape Cod Baseball League. He was the youngest player in the league his first summer, and he was an All-Star both seasons.

== Professional career ==
=== St. Louis Cardinals ===
The St. Louis Cardinals selected Stock as a catcher in the second round with the 67th overall selection of the 2009 MLB draft. He signed for a $525,000 signing bonus. In 2009, as a 19-year-old, he was both a Topps Short-Season/Rookie All-Star and an Appalachian League All-Star at catcher, as he batted .322/.386/.550 with seven home runs, tied for third among 2009 Cardinals draft picks, for the Johnson City Cardinals. Baseball America rated him the 10th-best prospect in the Cardinals organization. He played as a catcher until 2011, batting .243 in 696 at bats, and catching 29% of attempted base-stealers.

In 2012 with the Single-A Quad Cities River Bandits, Stock pitched in 38 games (two starts), recording a 5–2 record and 4.56 ERA.

In 2013, the Cardinals transitioned Stock into a full-time pitcher. In 2013, with the Peoria Chiefs in the Midwest League, he logged an 0–1 record with a 2.30 ERA, and with the Palm Beach Cardinals in the Florida State League he was 2–0 with a 4.37 ERA. Stock pitched to a 2–3 record with one save and a 4.12 ERA in 35 relief appearances split between Peoria and Palm Beach in 2014. The Cardinals released him on December 20, 2014.

=== Pittsburgh Pirates ===
On March 9, 2015, Stock signed a minor league contract with the Houston Astros organization. He was released by the club on March 31. On May 4, Stock signed a minor league deal with the Pittsburgh Pirates. He pitched in relief in 12 minor league games, primarily for the Single–A Bradenton Marauders with two games for the rookie–level Gulf Coast League Pirates, and three late-season games for the Double–A Altoona Curve. He elected free agency on November 6.

=== New Jersey Jackals ===
In 2016, Stock signed with the New Jersey Jackals of the Can-Am League, an independent baseball league. Pitching for the Jackals, he was 1–2 with five saves and a 2.85 ERA in 60 innings in which he struck out 73 batters over 52 games (a league record).

He said he never thought about quitting, not when he was released or even when he was playing independent baseball in New Jersey. Stock said: “Mostly because what else is there that’s better than playing baseball? I played a year of independent baseball, and that’s about as low on the totem pole as you can get but it was one of the best times I’ve had playing baseball. There was no thought about stopping." He recalled that "One offseason, I was living in my parents' basement and I was playing video games and my mother said, 'Go out and do something," and I said, 'Mom, relax. I'm going to play in the Major Leagues someday.'"

=== Cincinnati Reds ===
Stock signed with the Cincinnati Reds organization on March 21, 2017. Between the High-A Daytona Tortugas and the Double-A Pensacola Blue Wahoos, Stock was 9–5 with two saves and a 2.82 ERA in 70 innings in 41 relief appearances. He elected free agency following the season on November 6.

=== San Diego Padres ===
The San Diego Padres signed Stock to a minor league contract on November 27, 2017, with a non-roster invitation to spring training included. In spring training, his fastball reached 100 mph on a few pitches. Stock began the 2018 season playing for the San Antonio Missions of the Double-A Texas League, and received a midseason promotion to the El Paso Chihuahuas of the Triple-A Pacific Coast League. Between the two teams in 2018, before he was called up to the major leagues, he was 1–0 with 9 saves and a 1.69 ERA in 32 relief appearances over 37 1/3 innings, in which he gave up 22 hits and struck out 42 batters (averaging 10.2 strikeouts per 9 innings).

The Padres promoted Stock to the major leagues on June 24, 2018, and he made his major league debut that day, nine years after he was drafted as a catcher. With the Padres in 2018, he was 1–1 with a 2.50 ERA in 32 relief appearances over 39 2/3 innings, in which he struck out 38 batters. He threw 11 of the 12 fastest pitches by San Diego pitchers in 2018. He had the second-lowest swing rate for sliders he threw in the strike zone of any MLB pitcher (43.1%), behind only Aroldis Chapman (42.5%).

In 2019 with the Padres, Stock was 1–0 in ten relief appearances with a 10.13 ERA, as he struck out 15 batters in 10 2/3 innings (averaging 12.7 strikeouts per 9 innings). On April 1, Stock threw a fastball that was timed at 100.6 miles per hour (161.9 km/h), the second-fastest pitch Statcast had ever recorded for a Padre (behind only a 100.8 miles per hour (162.2 km/h) pitch by Jose Dominguez in 2016). Later in the season he was timed at 102 miles per hour (164 km/h). He regularly reached 100 miles per hour (160 km/h) with his fastball. His season ended three months early, as he suffered a right biceps strain. During the season, he threw a four-seam fastball that averaged 98 mph, an 83 mph slider, and an 85 mph changeup.

In the minor leagues in 2019, pitching 25 games for the El Paso Chihuahuas and 2 games for the AZL Padres in Arizona League, he was a combined 3–0 with a 3.86 ERA as he struck out 45 batters in 30 1/3 innings (averaging 13.4 strikeouts per 9 innings).

On October 30, 2019, Stock was claimed off waivers by the Philadelphia Phillies. He was designated for assignment on July 23, 2020, just before the start of the shortened 2020 season.

=== Boston Red Sox ===
On July 26, 2020, Stock was claimed off waivers by the Boston Red Sox. He made his first appearance for the Red Sox on August 11, pitching a scoreless 1 1/3 innings against the Tampa Bay Rays. He was optioned to, and recalled from, Boston's alternate training site several times during August and September.

On September 1, 2020, after a fan posted on Twitter "I implore you all to put on the Red Sox game, they have this dude Robert Stock pitching, and he looks like he's twice-divorced and completely given up on life. I can't stop watching him. It's transfixing," his wife responded on Twitter: "0 times divorced, but if he keeps walking the lead-off batter, I’ll consider filing." Overall with the 2020 Red Sox, Stock appeared in 10 games, all in relief, compiling an 0–1 record with 4.73 ERA and 14 strikeouts in 13 1/3 innings pitched. On November 25, Stock was designated for assignment.

=== Chicago Cubs ===
On December 2, 2020, Stock was claimed off waivers by the Chicago Cubs. On February 28, 2021, Stock was designated for assignment by the Cubs. On March 3, Stock cleared waivers and was outrighted to the Triple-A Iowa Cubs; he was also invited to Spring Training as a non-roster invitee. On June 16, Stock was selected to the active roster. Stock was optioned to Iowa on June 17 after allowing five runs in four innings against the New York Mets, struggling with command and walking six batters. With Iowa, he posted an 0–3 record with a 4.12 ERA as in 19 2/3 innings he struck out 25 batters while walking four. On June 20, Stock was designated for assignment by Chicago.

=== New York Mets ===
On June 22, 2021, Stock was claimed off waivers by the New York Mets and optioned to the Triple-A Syracuse Mets. On July 7, 2021, he started the second game of a double-header against the Milwaukee Brewers, pitching the first four innings. Stock was placed on the 60-day injured list on July 23 after suffering a right hamstring strain. Stock made 3 starts for the Mets, going 0–2 with an 8.00 ERA and 9 strikeouts. With Syracuse, in four starts he was 1-0 with a 2.87 ERA. On October 29, Stock elected free agency.

=== Doosan Bears ===
On January 4, 2022, Stock signed a one-year, $500,000 contract with the Doosan Bears of the KBO League. Stock started 29 games for Doosan, logging a 9–10 record and 3.60 ERA with 138 strikeouts in 165 innings pitched. He became a free agent after the season.

=== Milwaukee Brewers ===
On January 26, 2023, Stock signed a minor league contract with the Milwaukee Brewers. He began the year pitching for the Triple-A Nashville Sounds. In 11 games (4 starts), he struggled to an 0–3 record and 8.22 ERA with 19 strikeouts in 23 innings of work.

=== Long Island Ducks ===
On June 16, 2023, Stock signed with the Long Island Ducks of the Atlantic League of Professional Baseball. He threw a no-hitter against the Southern Maryland Blue Crabs on July 18. In 16 starts for Long Island, Stock registered a 9–4 record and 4.40 ERA with 92 strikeouts across 102 1/3 innings pitched.

=== Tecolotes de los Dos Laredos ===
On February 13, 2024, Stock signed with the Tecolotes de los Dos Laredos of the Mexican League. In 19 starts for Dos Laredos, he posted a 9–4 record and 3.38 ERA with 104 strikeouts, second-most in the Mexican League, across 98 2/3 innings pitched, with the lowest rate of home runs per nine innings pitched (0.2) in the league. He came in fifth in the voting for pitcher of year in the Mexican Baseball League, won by Trevor Bauer.

==== Naranjeros de Hermosillo ====
Stock next played for Naranjeros de Hermosillo in the Mexican Pacific Winter League. In the 2024-25 winter league season, he was 10-2 with a 1.60 ERA, as in 84 1/3 innings he gave up 53 hits and struck out 78 batters over 14 starts. He led the league in wins, ERA, and strikeouts. He became the first Naranjeros pitcher to win the pitching Triple Crown.

=== Boston Red Sox (second stint) ===
On January 14, 2025, Stock signed a minor league contract with the Boston Red Sox, with an invitation to spring training. After two scoreless appearances for the Triple-A Worcester Red Sox, Boston added Stock to their active roster on April 7. He tossed two innings against the Toronto Blue Jays that day, allowing one run on three hits with one walk. Stock was designated for assignment by Boston the following day. He cleared waivers and was sent outright to Worcester on April 10. On June 7, the Red Sox added Stock back to their active roster. He allowed two runs in 2/3 of an inning pitched against the New York Yankees on June 8, and was designated for assignment the following day. Stock was sent outright to Worcester after clearing waivers on June 11. For the season with Worcester, in 2025 he was 5-4 with 3.92 ERA, as in 19 games (15 starts) he pitched 85 innings in which he struck out 96 batters. He was released by the Red Sox organization on August 11.

=== New York Mets (second stint) ===
On November 25, 2025, Stock signed a minor league contract with the New York Mets. On March 8, 2026, it was announced that Stock would require surgery to address arterial thoracic outlet syndrome. Upon returning to health, he recorded a 2.91 ERA with 31 strikeouts across eight appearances (six starts) for the High–A Brooklyn Cyclones and Triple–A Syracuse Mets. On August 2, the Mets selected Stock's contract, adding him to their active roster. That day, in the third MLB start of his career, Stock pitched a career-high five innings against the Miami Marlins. He gave up one run, on three hits and no walks. Stock and the Mets agreed to a one-year contract on November 6, 2026.

== Team Israel ==
Stock played for Team Israel in the 2023 World Baseball Classic. He earned one save and made one start, taking the loss.

He was expected to pitch for Israel in the 2026 World Baseball Classic but was removed from the roster prior to the tournament due to shoulder discomfort.

== Personal life ==
Stock is married to Sara Stock (née Krutewicz), whom he met on a blind date when she was on spring break in Palm Beach while Stock was in the area for Cardinals spring training.

== See also ==
- List of Jewish Major League Baseball players
