= Josh Winckowski =

American baseball player (born 1998)

Toronto Blue Jays
- Pitcher
- Born: June 28, 1998 (age 28); Toledo, Ohio, U.S.
- Bats: Right Throws: Right

MLB debut
- May 28, 2022, for the Boston Red Sox

MLB statistics (through 2025 season)
- Win–loss record: 13–14
- Earned run average: 4.20
- Strikeouts: 195
- Stats at Baseball Reference

Teams
- Boston Red Sox (2022–2025)

Joshua Winckowski (born June 28, 1998) is an American professional baseball pitcher in the Toronto Blue Jays organization. He has previously played in Major League Baseball (MLB) for the Boston Red Sox. Listed at 6 feet 4 inches (1.93 m) and 202 pounds (92 kg), he throws and bats right-handed.

== Career ==
=== Toronto Blue Jays ===
Winckowski is from Toledo, Ohio. He attended Toledo Mud Hens games at Fifth Third Field as a child, but moved to Florida for high school. Winckowski attended Estero High School in Estero, Florida. The Toronto Blue Jays selected him in the 15th round of the 2016 MLB draft. Winckowski played in the Blue Jays' farm system from 2016 through 2019, reaching the High-A level with the Dunedin Blue Jays. In four seasons with the Toronto organization, Winckowski made 54 appearances (50 starts), compiling an 18–17 win–loss record with a 3.35 earned run average (ERA).

=== Boston Red Sox ===
On January 27, 2021, Winckowski was traded to the New York Mets alongside Yennsy Díaz and Sean Reid-Foley in exchange for Steven Matz. On February 10, Winckowski was traded to the Boston Red Sox with Franchy Cordero and three players to be named later in a three-team trade, where the Kansas City Royals acquired Andrew Benintendi and the Mets received Khalil Lee. Winckowski began the year in Double-A with the Portland Sea Dogs and was promoted late in the season to the Triple-A Worcester Red Sox. Overall with both teams, he appeared in 23 games (22 starts), compiling a 3.94 ERA and 9–4 record while striking out 101 batters in 112 innings. After the regular season, Winckowski was selected to play for the Scottsdale Scorpions of the Arizona Fall League. On November 19, in advance of the Rule 5 draft, the Red Sox added Winckowski to their 40-man roster.

Winckowski began the 2022 season with Worcester. The Red Sox activated him on May 28 to start the second game of a doubleheader against the Baltimore Orioles at Fenway Park. Winckowski allowed four runs on six hits in three innings, taking the loss. He was returned to Worcester the following day. Winckowski was next recalled for a start on June 15, and registered his first MLB win after pitching five scoreless innings in a 10–1 victory over the Oakland Athletics at Fenway. Winckowski remained in the starting rotation until being placed on the COVID-related list on July 14; he rejoined the team on July 26. Through the remainder of the season, he split time between Worcester and Boston. In 15 games (14 starts) with Boston, Winckowski posted a 5–7 record with 5.89 ERA while striking out 44 batters in 70 1/3 innings.

For the 2023 season, Winckowski appeared in 60 Red Sox games (one start) and posted a 4–4 record with three saves and a 2.88 ERA while striking out 82 batters in 84 1/3 innings. Winckowski opened the 2024 season as a member of Boston's bullpen, until being optioned to Worcester on May 12; at the time, he had a 3.33 ERA in 24 1/3 innings.

Winckowski was optioned to Triple-A Worcester to begin the 2025 season. He was with Boston for nine days during April. On June 7, 2025, he was placed on the 60-day injured list with an elbow issue. Winckowski was designated for assignment by the Red Sox on November 18. On November 21, he was non-tendered by Boston and became a free agent.

=== Toronto Blue Jays (second stint) ===
On December 31, 2025, Winckowski signed a two-year minor league contract with the Toronto Blue Jays; it was also revealed that he had recently undergone internal brace surgery and would miss the majority of the 2026 season. In 6 games (4 starts) between Triple-A and Single-A throwing 13.2 innings going 1-0 with a 0.66 ERA and 17 strikeouts.
