= Billy McKinney (baseball) =

American baseball player (born 1994)

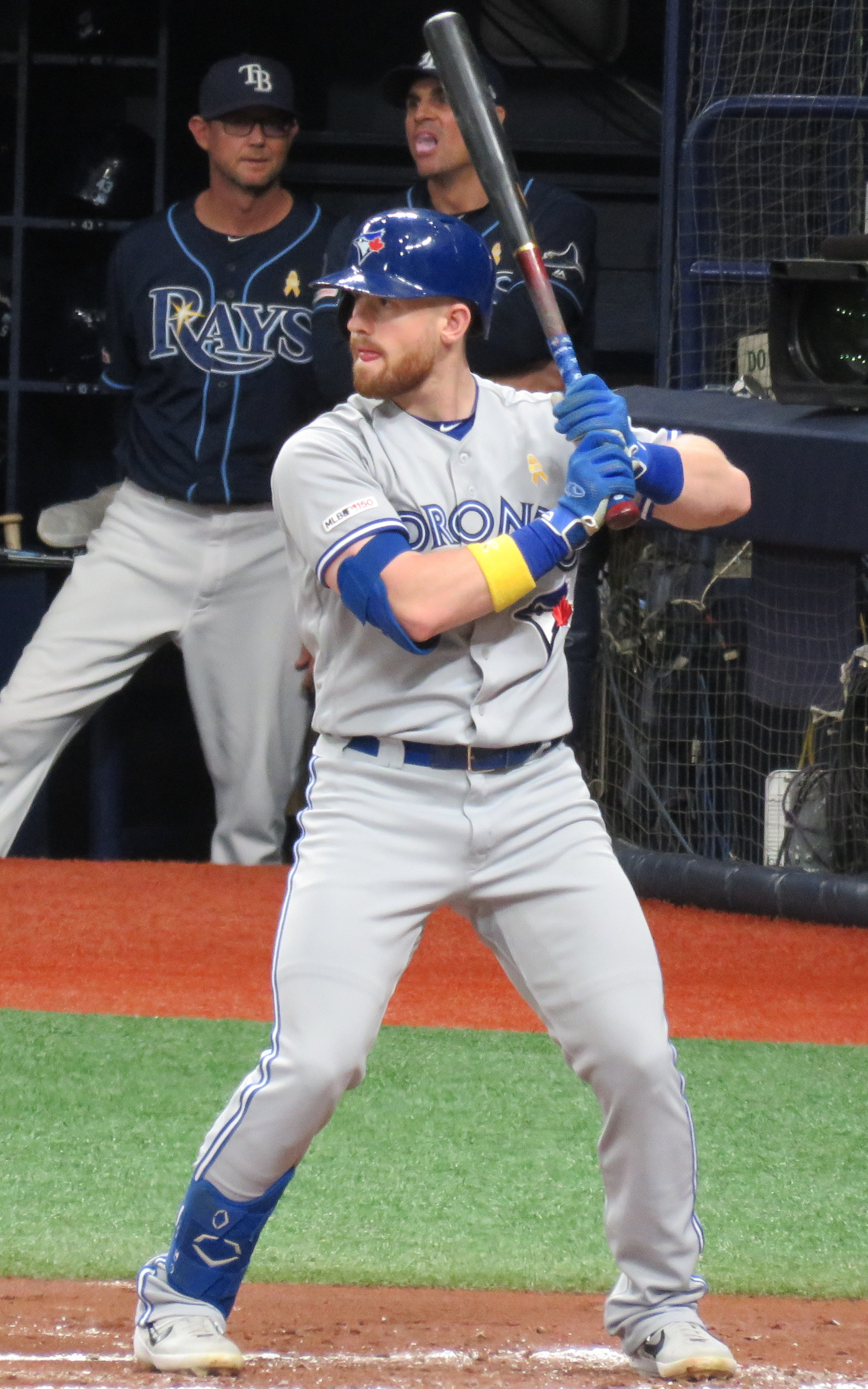
- McKinney with the Toronto Blue Jays in 2019

Free agent
- Outfielder
- Born: August 23, 1994 (age 31); Dallas, Texas, U.S.
- Bats: Left Throws: Left

MLB debut
- March 30, 2018, for the New York Yankees

MLB statistics (through 2025 season)
- Batting average: .209
- Home runs: 34
- Runs batted in: 89
- Stats at Baseball Reference

Teams
- New York Yankees (2018); Toronto Blue Jays (2018–2020); Milwaukee Brewers (2021); New York Mets (2021); Los Angeles Dodgers (2021); Oakland Athletics (2022); New York Yankees (2023); Pittsburgh Pirates (2024); Texas Rangers (2025)

William Landis McKinney (born August 23, 1994) is an American professional baseball outfielder who is a free agent. He has previously played in Major League Baseball (MLB) for the New York Yankees, Toronto Blue Jays, Milwaukee Brewers, New York Mets, Los Angeles Dodgers, Oakland Athletics, Pittsburgh Pirates, and Texas Rangers. McKinney was a first-round draft pick (24th overall) of the Athletics in 2013. He was traded to the Chicago Cubs in 2014, and the Yankees in 2016. He made his MLB debut with the Yankees in 2018, and was traded to the Blue Jays during the season, with whom he played for until 2020.

== Career ==
=== Amateur career ===
McKinney attended Plano West Senior High School in Plano, Texas. He led the school's baseball team to the state's Class 5A semifinals. He committed to play college baseball at Texas Christian University.

=== Oakland Athletics ===
The Oakland Athletics selected McKinney in the first round, with the 24th overall selection, of the 2013 Major League Baseball draft. He signed with the Athletics, receiving a $1.8 million signing bonus. McKinney split his first professional season between the rookie-level Arizona League Athletics and Low-A Vermont Lake Monsters.

McKinney began the 2014 season with the Stockton Ports of the High–A California League. He made 75 appearances for Stockton, and batted .241/.330/.400 with 10 home runs, 33 RBI, and five stolen bases.

=== Chicago Cubs ===
On July 4, 2014, the Athletics traded McKinney to the Chicago Cubs with Addison Russell and Dan Straily, in exchange for Jeff Samardzija and Jason Hammel. He was assigned to the Daytona Cubs of the High–A Florida State League. He batted .301 in 51 games for Daytona.

McKinney began the 2015 season with the Myrtle Beach Pelicans of the High–A Carolina League. After he batted .340 in 29 games, the Cubs promoted him to the Tennessee Smokies of the Double-A Southern League in May. He suffered a hairline fracture in his right knee in August, ending his season. McKinney returned to Tennessee in 2016.

=== New York Yankees ===
On July 25, 2016, the Cubs traded McKinney, Adam Warren, Gleyber Torres, and Rashad Crawford to the New York Yankees in exchange for Aroldis Chapman, and McKinney joined the Trenton Thunder of the Double-A Eastern League. McKinney ended the 2016 season with a .246 batting average, four home runs, and 44 RBIs. McKinney began the 2017 season with Trenton, and was promoted to the Scranton/Wilkes-Barre RailRiders of the Triple-A International League in late June. He finished the 2017 season with a combined .277 batting average with 16 home runs and 64 RBIs between both clubs. The Yankees added him to their 40-man roster after the season.

The Yankees optioned McKinney to the RailRiders at the end of spring training in 2018. An injury to Aaron Hicks led the Yankees to promote McKinney to the major leagues on March 30. He made his major league debut that day, and recorded his first hit in his first at bat. The next day, McKinney sprained the AC joint in his left shoulder, and went on the disabled list. On May 25, McKinney was activated from the disabled list and optioned to the minors.

=== Toronto Blue Jays ===
On July 26, 2018, the Yankees traded McKinney and Brandon Drury to the Toronto Blue Jays in exchange for J. A. Happ. The Blue Jays assigned McKinney to the Buffalo Bisons of the International League and promoted him to the major leagues August 17. On August 21, McKinney hit his first major league home run off Baltimore Orioles pitcher Ryan Meisinger. McKinney appeared in 36 games for the Blue Jays in 2018, hitting .252 with six home runs and 13 RBI. In 2019, McKinney hit 12 home runs with 28 RBI in 84 games. On September 11, 2020, McKinney was designated for assignment by the Blue Jays.

=== Milwaukee Brewers ===
On September 14, 2020, McKinney was claimed off waivers by the Milwaukee Brewers. McKinney hit .207 with three home runs and six RBI in 40 games for the Brewers before being designated for assignment on May 22, 2021.

=== New York Mets ===
On May 25, 2021, McKinney was traded to the New York Mets in exchange for Pedro Quintana. In 39 games with the Mets, McKinney slashed .220/.304/.473 with five home runs and 14 RBI, before being designated for assignment on July 16.

=== Los Angeles Dodgers ===
On July 21, 2021, McKinney was traded to the Los Angeles Dodgers in exchange for minor league outfielder Carlos Rincon. He played in 37 games for the Dodgers, hitting .146 with one homer and seven RBI. McKinney appeared in four games in the postseason, primarily as a defensive replacement and only had one plate appearance, in the 2021 NLDS, in which he struck out.

On November 19, 2021, McKinney was designated for assignment by the Dodgers. On November 22, he and Zach Reks were traded to the Texas Rangers for cash considerations. However, the Rangers non-tendered him on November 30, making him a free agent.

=== Oakland Athletics (second stint) ===
On March 16, 2022, McKinney signed a minor-league deal with the Oakland Athletics that included an invitation to Spring Training. On April 7, the Athletics selected McKinney's contract, adding him to their opening day roster. McKinney was designated for assignment on May 9, after going 5-for-52 (.096) with one home run and four RBI in 23 games. He cleared waivers and was sent outright to the Triple–A Las Vegas Aviators on May 11. In 69 games with Las Vegas, McKinney batted .295/.396/.530 with 12 home runs and 49 RBI. He elected free agency following the season on November 10.

=== New York Yankees (second stint) ===
On December 19, 2022, McKinney signed a minor league deal with the New York Yankees. He began the 2023 season with the Triple–A Scranton/Wilkes-Barre RailRiders, playing in 40 games and hitting .274/.388/.511 with 9 home runs and 25 RBI. On June 7, 2023, McKinney was selected to the major league roster after Aaron Judge was placed on the injured list. In 48 games for the Yankees, he batted .227/.320/.406 with 6 home runs and 14 RBI. Following the season on November 2, McKinney was removed from the 40–man roster and sent outright to Triple–A Scranton. He elected free agency on November 6. On December 8, McKinney re-signed with the Yankees on a minor league contract.

=== Pittsburgh Pirates ===
On December 14, 2023, McKinney was traded to the Pittsburgh Pirates in exchange for cash considerations. In 40 games for the Triple–A Indianapolis Indians, he slashed .295/.356/.450 with five home runs and 18 RBI. McKinney had his contract selected to the major league roster on August 19, 2024. In 10 games for Pittsburgh, he went 5–for–25 (.200) with no home runs and two RBI. McKinney was designated for assignment by the Pirates on September 6. He cleared waivers and was sent outright to Indianapolis on September 8. McKinney elected free agency on October 1.

=== New York Mets (second stint) ===
On March 21, 2025, McKinney signed a minor league contract with the New York Mets. In 33 appearances for the Triple-A Syracuse Mets, he batted .184/.285/.307 with three home runs and nine RBI. McKinney was released by the Mets organization on May 18.

=== Texas Rangers ===
On May 27, 2025, McKinney signed a minor league contract with the Texas Rangers. In 24 appearances for the Triple-A Round Rock Express, he batted .295/.433/.487 with three home runs, 18 RBI, and three stolen bases. On July 1, the Rangers selected McKinney's contract, adding him to their active roster. He made his Rangers debut that same day, and went 1-for-7 (.143) with a walk in two games for the team. McKinney was designated for assignment by Texas on July 4. He cleared waivers and was sent outright to Round Rock on July 6, but elected free agency the following day. On July 8, McKinney re-signed with Texas on a minor league contract. On September 24, the Rangers selected McKinney's contract, adding him back to their active roster. He went 3-for-13 with one RBI in four additional games for the team. On November 5, McKinney was removed from the 40-man roster and sent outright to Round Rock; he subsequently rejected the assignment and elected free agency.
