= Khalil Lee =

American baseball player (born 1998)

- Outfielder
- Born: June 26, 1998 (age 27); Newark, Delaware, U.S.
- Batted: Left Threw: Left

MLB debut
- May 17, 2021, for the New York Mets

Last MLB appearance
- June 11, 2022, for the New York Mets

MLB statistics
- Batting average: .100
- Home runs: 1
- Runs batted in: 4
- Stats at Baseball Reference

Teams
- New York Mets (2021–2022)

Khalil Rashad Lee (born June 26, 1998) is an American former professional baseball outfielder. He has previously played in Major League Baseball (MLB) for the New York Mets. He made his MLB debut in 2021.

== Career ==
=== Amateur career ===
Lee graduated from Flint Hill School in Oakton, Virginia, where he played on their baseball team as both a pitcher and outfielder. As a senior, he pitched to a 7–0 record with a 0.33 ERA, striking out 87 in 43 innings pitched, along with batting .471 with six home runs, 23 RBIs, a .634 OBP and a .941 SLG. He was named the Gatorade Baseball Player of the Year for the state of Virginia.

=== Kansas City Royals ===
Lee was committed to play baseball at Liberty University. However, after he was drafted by the Kansas City Royals in the third round of the 2016 Major League Baseball draft, he chose to sign with the Royals for $579,700 rather than attend college. The Royals chose to assign him to the Arizona League Royals as an outfielder, and in 49 games, he batted .269 with six home runs, 29 RBIs, 43 runs scored, and eight triples along with an .880 OPS. He spent 2017 with the Lexington Legends and posted a .237 batting average with 17 home runs, 61 RBIs, 18 stolen bases and a .344 OBP in 121 games. In a July 2017 game with the Legends, Lee set a professional baseball record for strikeouts in a single game, striking out eight times in a 21-inning game against the Delmarva Shorebirds.

MLB.com ranked Lee as Kansas City's top prospect going into the 2018 season. He began the season with the Wilmington Blue Rocks, with whom he was named a Carolina League All-Star, and was promoted to the Northwest Arkansas Naturals in June. In 100 games between the two clubs, he batted .263 with six home runs and 51 RBIs. He returned to Northwest Arkansas in 2019, earning Texas League All-Star honors. Over 129 games, he slashed .264/.363/.372 with eight home runs, 51 RBIs, and 53 stolen bases.

He did not play a minor league game in 2020 due to the cancellation of the minor league season caused by the COVID-19 pandemic. On November 20, 2020, Lee was added to the 40-man roster.

=== New York Mets ===
On February 10, 2021, the Royals traded Lee to the New York Mets in a three-team trade in which the Kansas City Royals acquired Andrew Benintendi and the Boston Red Sox acquired Franchy Cordero, Josh Winckowski, and three players to be named later.

On May 12, 2021, Lee was promoted to the major leagues for the first time. On May 15, Lee was optioned down to Triple-A without making an appearance. On May 17, Lee was recalled to the majors. He made his MLB debut that day as a replacement for Kevin Pillar, who left due to injury, and struck out in his only at bat. On May 21 during a game against the Miami Marlins, Lee hit a go-ahead double off of pitcher Adam Cimber down the right field line in the top of the 12th inning, giving the Mets the lead. He collected his first big league hit and his first RBI. The Mets won the game 6–5.

Lee began the 2022 season with the Triple-A Syracuse Mets. He slumped to start the season, was sent down to the High-A St. Lucie Mets for a week in May in order to work on his mechanics and thrived upon his return to Triple-A. On June 8, 2022, following injuries to Pete Alonso and Starling Marte, he was promoted to the majors. On June 11, Lee hit his first career home run against Oliver Ortega of the Los Angeles Angels. Lee's home run proved to be his only hit of the season in 2 games for the Mets. He played in 100 games for Syracuse, slashing .211/.326/.366 with 10 home runs, 37 RBI, and 14 stolen bases.

On February 6, 2023, Lee was designated for assignment following the acquisition of Sam Coonrod. On February 10, he cleared waivers and was sent outright to Triple-A Syracuse. In 21 games for Syracuse, Lee struggled to a .185/.299/.323 slash line with 1 home run, 7 RBI, and 2 stolen bases. He was released by the Mets organization on May 7.

=== Southern Maryland Blue Crabs ===
On June 1, 2023, Lee signed with the Southern Maryland Blue Crabs of the Atlantic League of Professional Baseball. In 89 games, he slashed .277/.401/.482 with 15 home runs, 66 RBI, and 13 stolen bases.

=== Dorados de Chihuahua ===
On March 29, 2024, Lee signed with the Toros de Tijuana of the Mexican League. On April 5, Lee was loaned to the Dorados de Chihuahua of the Mexican League. In three games for the Dorados, he hit .154/.267/.231 with no home runs or RBI. Lee was released by the Chihuahuas on April 16.

== Personal life ==
On February 1, 2023, Lee was accused by his ex-girlfriend of physical and verbal abuse. Syracuse police issued an arrest warrant for him on the charge of criminal obstruction of breathing. A lawsuit that was filed in the United States District Court for the Northern District of New York on the same day alleged he abused his former girlfriend while playing for the Triple-A Syracuse Mets in 2022.
