= Sam McWilliams =

American baseball player (born 1995)

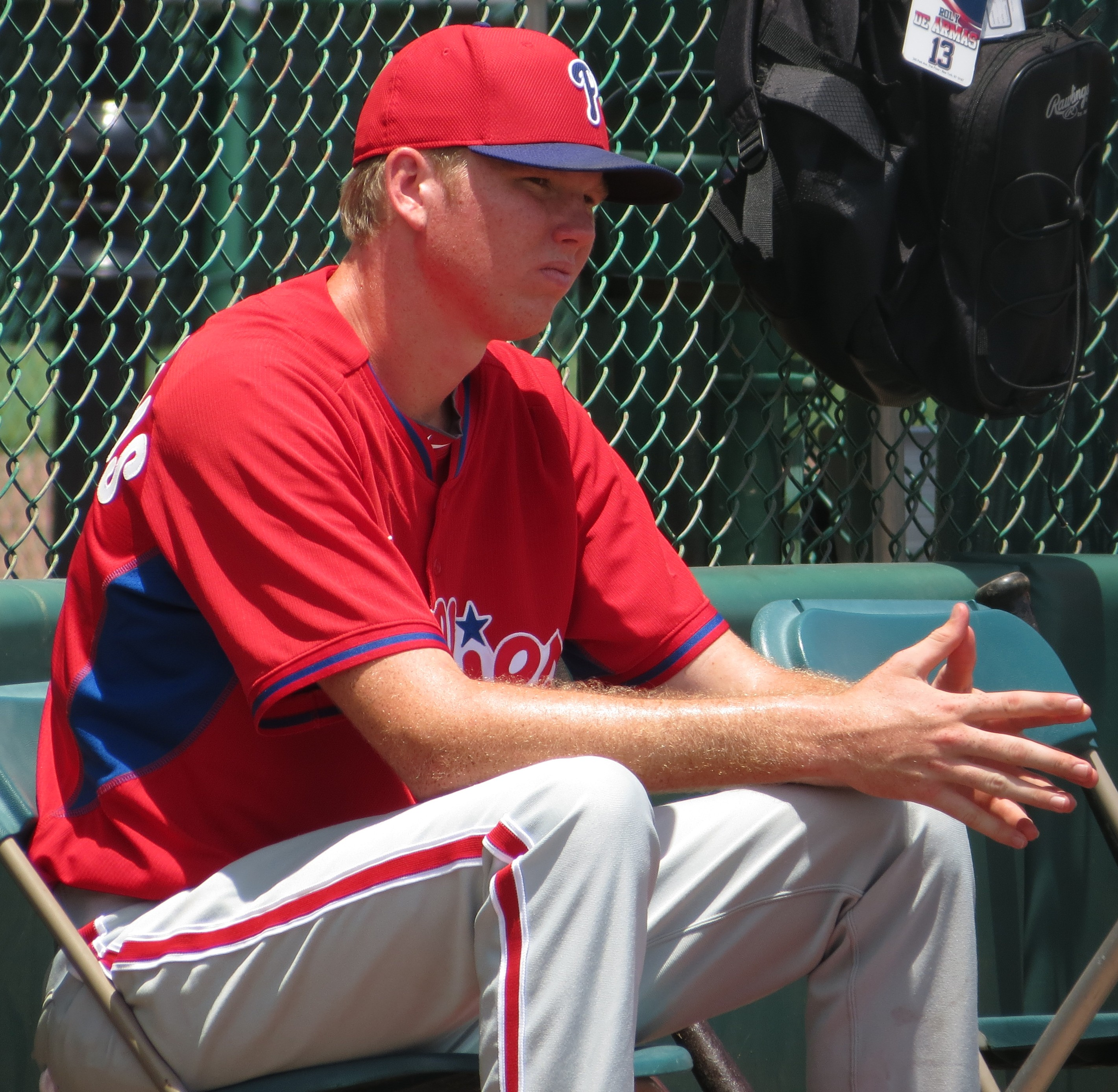
- McWilliams with the GCL Phillies in 2014

Free agent
- Pitcher
- Born: September 4, 1995 (age 31); Orlando, Florida, U.S.
- Bats: Right Throws: Right
- Stats at Baseball Reference

Samuel Rutherford McWilliams (born September 4, 1995) is an American professional baseball pitcher who is a free agent. He spent time on the 40-man roster of the New York Mets and San Diego Padres, and was a Rule 5 pick by the Kansas City Royals, but has not yet played in the major leagues.

== Career ==
=== Amateur career ===
McWilliams attended Beech High School in Hendersonville, Tennessee, where he pitched for the school's baseball team. In 2014, his senior year, he was named to the All-State team by the Tennessee Sports Writers Association. He had committed to play college baseball for Tennessee Tech.

=== Philadelphia Phillies ===
The Philadelphia Phillies selected McWilliams in the eighth round of the 2014 MLB draft. He made his professional debut with the rookie ball Gulf Coast League Phillies, pitching to a 5.40 ERA in 9 games. McWilliams made 7 appearances for the GCL Phillies in 2015, registering a 3.27 ERA in 33 innings of work.

=== Arizona Diamondbacks ===
On November 14, 2015, the Phillies traded McWilliams to the Arizona Diamondbacks in exchange for Jeremy Hellickson. He spent the 2016 season with the Kane County Cougars of the Single–A Midwest League, and posted a 3–6 record and 3.98 ERA in 15 games. He returned to Kane County for the 2017 season, pitching to an 11–6 record and 2.84 ERA with 98 strikeouts in 133.0 innings pitched. He began the 2018 season with the Visalia Rawhide of the High–A California League.

=== Tampa Bay Rays ===
On May 1, 2018, the Tampa Bay Rays acquired McWilliams and Colin Poche from the Diamondbacks as the players to be named later from the February trade in which the Diamondbacks acquired Steven Souza Jr. from the Rays. He finished the year split between the High-A Charlotte Stone Crabs and the Double-A Montgomery Biscuits, pitching to a 6–8 record with 101 strikeouts. The Kansas City Royals selected McWilliams in the 2018 Rule 5 draft. After pitching to a 15.43 ERA in 4 2/3 innings in spring training, the Royals returned McWilliams to the Rays on March 24, 2019. McWilliams split the 2019 season between Montgomery and the Triple-A Durham Bulls, posting a 7–9 record and 4.10 ERA in 26 games between the two teams. McWilliams did not play in a game in 2020 due to the cancellation of the minor league season because of the COVID-19 pandemic. On November 2, 2020, he elected free agency.

=== New York Mets ===
Due to changes McWilliams made to his mechanics and repertoire at Tampa Bay's alternate site during the 2020 season, roughly half the teams in Major League Baseball had inquired about signing him after he became a free agent. Ultimately, on November 20, 2020, McWilliams signed a one-year major league contract with the New York Mets for $750,000, far more than the Major League minimum despite never having pitched in a major league game. On May 31, 2021, McWilliams was designated for assignment by New York after struggling to a 10.80 ERA in 7 appearances for the Triple-A Syracuse Mets. McWilliams had not appeared in the majors for the Mets at the time of his designation.

=== San Diego Padres ===
On June 5, 2021, McWilliams was claimed off waivers by the San Diego Padres. On June 19, McWilliams was outrighted off of the 40-man roster without making a major league appearance. He split time between the Double-A San Antonio Missions and Triple-A El Paso Chihuahuas to finish out the year. With El Paso, he struggled to a 10.07 ERA in 18 appearances, and with San Antonio, he registered a 4.91 ERA in 11 games. McWilliams elected free agency on October 6.

=== Cincinnati Reds ===
On March 19, 2022, McWilliams signed a minor league contract with the Cincinnati Reds. McWilliams appeared in 9 games split between the rookie-level Arizona Complex League Reds and Double-A Chattanooga Lookouts, logging a cumulative 0–5 record and 10.13 ERA with 18 strikeouts in 18 2/3 innings pitched. He was released by the Reds organization on June 18.

In August 2022, McWilliams ended his playing career and became a sales representative with Blast Athletics.

=== Chicago Cubs ===
On January 29, 2024, McWilliams came out of retirement and signed a minor league contract with the Chicago Cubs. In 34 appearances for the Triple–A Iowa Cubs, he struggled to a 4–4 record and 6.60 ERA with 88 strikeouts over 66 1/3 innings pitched. McWilliams was released by the Cubs organization on August 13.

=== Milwaukee Brewers ===
On September 5, 2024, McWilliams signed a minor league contract with the Milwaukee Brewers organization. He made one scoreless appearance the Double-A Biloxi Shuckers, and another appearance for the Triple-A Nashville Sounds, in which he allowed three runs in one inning of work.

McWilliams made 18 appearances for Triple-A Nashville in 2025, registering an 0-2 record and 5.66 ERA with 31 strikeouts across 20 2/3 innings pitched. McWilliams was released by the Brewers organization on July 2, 2025.

=== Toros de Tijuana ===
On July 11, 2025, McWilliams signed with the Toros de Tijuana of the Mexican League. In 14 appearances for the Toros, he posted a 3–1 record and 3.86 ERA with 20 strikeouts and one save over 14 innings of work.

McWilliams made 27 appearances for Tijuana during the 2026 season, compiling a 2–1 record and 3.04 ERA with 42 strikeouts across 26 2/3 innings of relief.

=== Boston Red Sox ===
On July 2, 2026, McWilliams signed a minor league contract with the Boston Red Sox. In 20 games with Triple-A Worcester Red Sox he threw 26 innings of relief going 3-2 with a 4.15 ERA with 35 strikeouts and 2 saves. He elected free agency on November 2.

== See also ==
- Rule 5 draft results
