= Colin Poche =

American baseball player (born 1994)

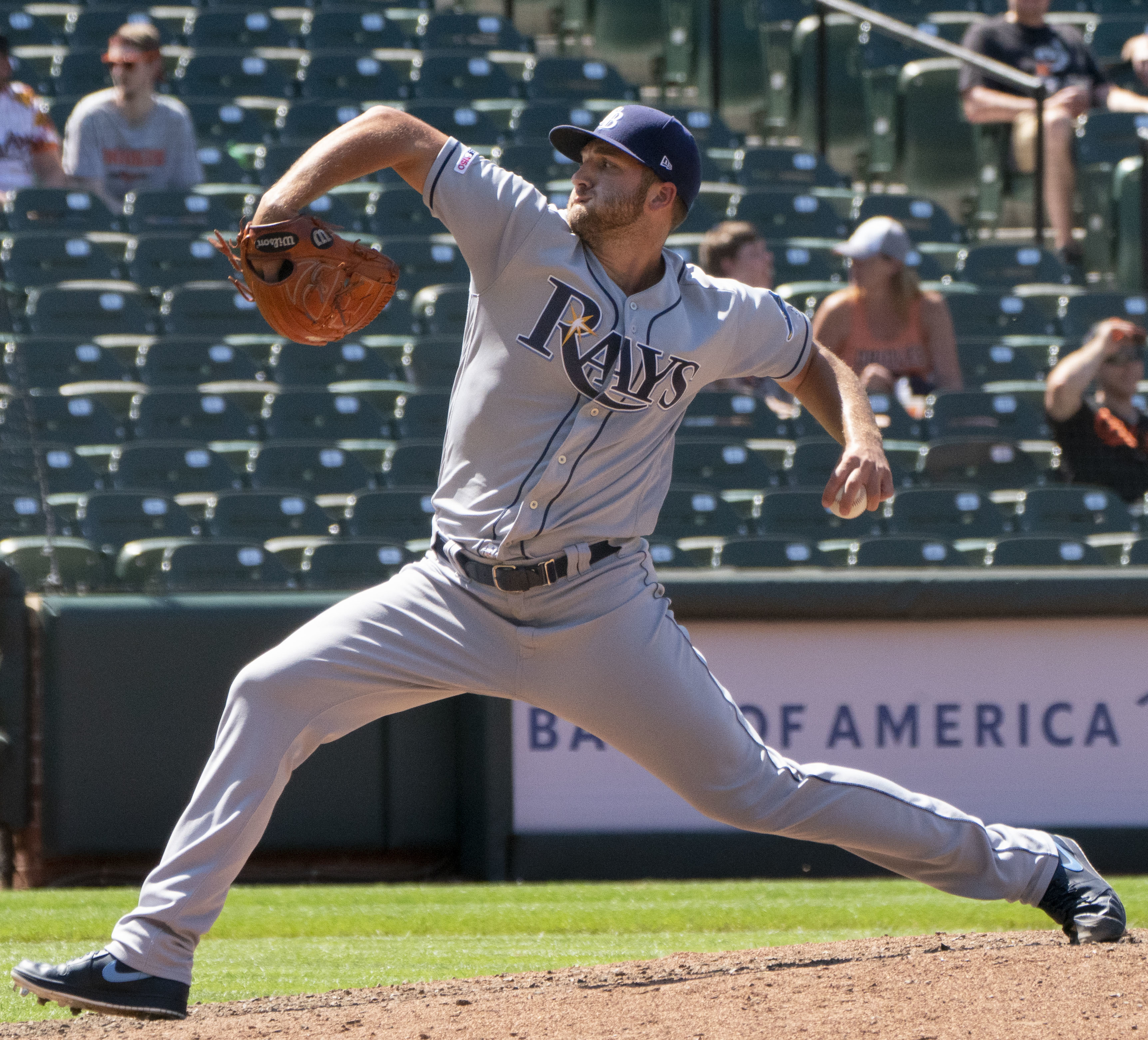
- Poche with the Tampa Bay Rays in 2019

Free agent
- Pitcher
- Born: January 17, 1994 (age 32); Flower Mound, Texas, U.S.
- Bats: Left Throws: Left

MLB debut
- June 8, 2019, for the Tampa Bay Rays

MLB statistics (through 2025 season)
- Win–loss record: 23–14
- Earned run average: 4.01
- Strikeouts: 241
- Stats at Baseball Reference

Teams
- Tampa Bay Rays (2019, 2022–2024); Washington Nationals (2025); New York Mets (2025)

Colin Michael Poche (/poʊˈʃeɪ/ poh-SHAY; born January 17, 1994) is an American professional baseball pitcher who is a free agent. He has previously played in Major League Baseball (MLB) for the Tampa Bay Rays, Washington Nationals, and New York Mets. He made his MLB debut in 2019.

== Amateur career ==
Poche attended Marcus High School in Flower Mound, Texas. As a senior in 2012, he went 7–3 with a 0.21 earned run average (ERA). He was drafted by the Baltimore Orioles in the fifth round of the 2012 Major League Baseball draft out of high school, but did not sign and attended the University of Arkansas, where he played college baseball.

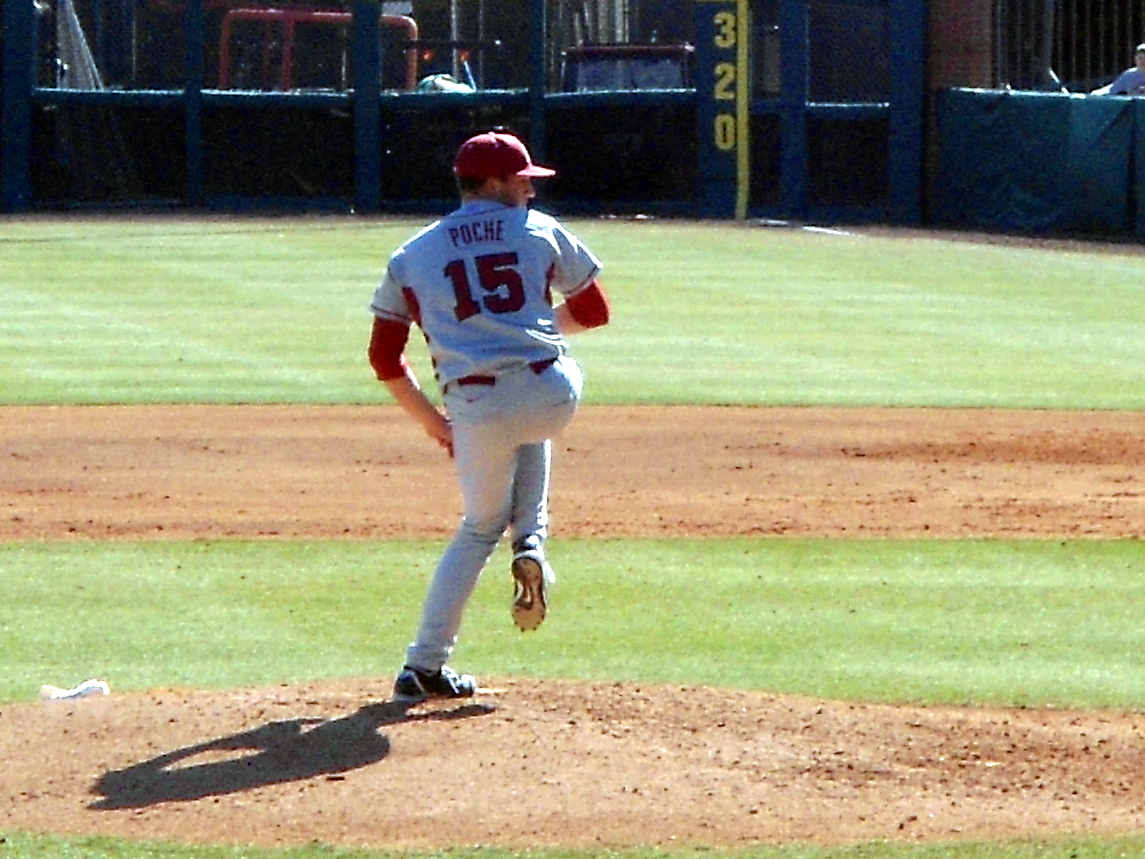
Poche with the 2013 Razorbacks

In June 2014, Poche underwent Tommy John surgery and then did not pitch during 2015. After two years at Arkansas, he transferred to Dallas Baptist University. In 2016, as a redshirt junior, he pitched to a 9–1 record with a 2.38 ERA in 16 starts. After the season, he was selected by the Arizona Diamondbacks in the 14th round of the 2016 MLB draft.

== Professional career ==
=== Arizona Diamondbacks ===
Poche signed with Arizona and made his professional debut during the 2016 season with the Hillsboro Hops, a Low–A team, where he compiled a 1–2 record with a 3.19 ERA in 31 innings pitched. He spent 2017 with the Single–A Kane County Cougars and High–A Visalia Rawhide where he posted a combined 3–1 record and 1.25 ERA in 50 1/3 innings pitched in relief. After the season, he pitched in the Arizona Fall League. Poche started 2018 with the Jackson Generals at the Double-A level.

=== Tampa Bay Rays ===
On May 1, 2018, Poche was acquired by the Tampa Bay Rays as a player to be named later to complete the Steven Souza trade from February 2018. After three games with the Montgomery Biscuits, Poche was promoted to the Triple-A Durham Bulls of the International League. He was named to the 2018 MLB Pipeline team of the year after pitching to a 0.82 ERA in 66 innings between both levels. Poche was also named the Rays Minor League Reliever of the Year.

Poche returned to Durham to begin 2019 On June 8, his contract was selected and he was called up to the major leagues for the first time. He made his MLB debut that night versus the Boston Red Sox. He went on to make a total of 51 major-league appearances during 2019, all in relief, compiling a 5–5 record with a 4.70 ERA.

On July 21, 2020, the Rays announced Poche would miss the entire abbreviated 2020 season with a torn UCL that required Tommy John surgery. On February 17, 2021, Poche was placed on the 60-day injured list as he continued to recover from surgery. He did not pitch professionally during the 2021 season. In 2022, Poche made six relief appearances with Triple-A Durham, and 64 relief appearances with Tampa Bay during the regular season.

Poche made 43 appearances for the Rays in 2024, compiling a 3.86 ERA with 33 strikeouts across 37 1/3 innings pitched. On November 22, 2024, the Rays non–tendered Poche, making him a free agent.

=== Washington Nationals ===
On February 7, 2025, Poche signed a minor league contract with the Washington Nationals. On March 22, the Nationals selected his contract after he made the team's Opening Day roster. In 13 appearances for Washington, Poche struggled to an 11.42 ERA with 10 strikeouts across 8 2/3 innings pitched. On May 1, Poche was designated for assignment by the Nationals following the signing of Andrew Chafin.

=== New York Mets ===
On May 7, 2025, Poche signed a minor league contract with the New York Mets. In 12 appearances for the Triple-A Syracuse Mets, he logged an 0-1 record and 4.26 ERA with 13 strikeouts and one save across 12 2/3 innings pitched. On June 27, the Mets selected Poche's contract, adding him to their active roster. In his sole appearance for the team, he allowed two runs on two hits with one strikeout over 2/3 of an inning. Poche was designated for assignment by the Mets on June 29. He elected free agency after clearing waivers on July 1. On July 4, Poche re-signed with the Mets on a minor league contract. He was released by the Mets on August 2.

=== Detroit Tigers ===
On February 25, 2026, Poche signed a minor league contract with the Detroit Tigers. On April 2, Poche was released by the Tigers organization.
