= Vista Murrieta High School =

Location
- 28251 Clinton Keith Road; Murrieta, California 92563; United States; 33°35′47″N 117°09′55″W

Information
- Type: Public
- Established: 2003
- School district: Murrieta Valley Unified School District
- Principal: Celeste Scallion
- Teaching staff: 142.75 (FTE)
- Grades: 9th–12th
- Enrollment: 3,382 (2023–2024)
- Student to teacher ratio: 23.69
- Colors: Blue, Vegas gold and white
- Athletics: Southwestern League
- Mascot: Bronco
- Website: broncos.murrieta.k12.ca.us

Vista Murrieta High School (VMHS) is a comprehensive, four-year high school located in Murrieta, California, United States. It is operated by the Murrieta Valley Unified School District. It opened in August 2003, relieving the overcrowding at Murrieta Valley High School, which had been the district's only comprehensive high school until that time. During the 2022–2023 school year, the school served over 3,800 students. The campus sits on 68 acres (280,000 m^{2}) overlooking most of the City of Murrieta to the south.

VMHS is a four-year comprehensive high school accredited by the Western Association of Schools and Colleges (as of 2006).

The current principal is Celeste Scallion, who took over after the 2020–2021 school year, after former principal Mick Wager.

This school was named "the most spirited school in the nation" from MaxPreps.com on March 31, 2009, as well as 2010. It was awarded the same title from Varsitybrands.com for the 2015–2016 school year, and recently won the title again for the 2022–2023 school year. It is a California Distinguished School.

In the 2022–2023 school year, Vista Murrieta celebrated its 20th anniversary, after opening in 2003. Celebrations included a 20th anniversary themed Homecoming, 20th anniversary flags on light posts around the school, and merchandise including sweatshirts and baseball caps. Although this was their 20th year open, the school's 20th graduating class will walk in 2026.

== Golden Alliance ==
The Vista Murrieta Golden Alliance is the high school's marching band and color guard. They won their first Bands of America Regional Champion title at the 2016 Bands of America Long Beach Regionals in history. In addition, the band traveled to Indianapolis, Indiana in November 2016 to compete in Grand Nationals. They successfully got to semi-finals and acquired 14th place, with their show, Cinders. In addition, they won The Albert J Castronovo Esprit de Corps Award for their spirited excellence during their travels. A few weeks after the Golden Alliance returned from Indianapolis, they learned that they also won the Sudler Shield Award from the John Philip Sousa Foundation for their world class excellence. In November 2019, the band traveled to San Antonio, Texas and competed at the Bands of America San Antonio Super Regional Championships. They acquired 20th place out of 82 bands with their show, Luna. The band would receive their second and third Bands of America Regional Champion titles with their field show, The Invitation, in November 2025 at the Bands of America California Regional in Rancho Cucamonga, and the Bands of America Utah Regional in St. George.

== Athletics ==
Season	Baseball	Football	Men's Basketball	Softball	Men's Soccer	Girls Volleyball	Track & Field Cross Country 2011 season Girls Varsity runner up at state placing second in Division 1
2009–2010 Records	in season	13-1 (Undefeated SWL Champs) (CIF Runner-Up)	15–13 (CIF First Round Loss)	in season	6-13-5	13-15-0 (CIF First Round Loss)	7–0 ('SWL League Champ, CIF D1 Men's Champs, Nike Track Nationals Champs')
2008–2009 Records	17-12 (CIF quarterfinalist)	9-3 (CIF quarterfinalist)	17-12 (CIF first round loss)	27–5 (SWL Champs) (CIF Runner-Up)	7-14-1	3-13-0	7–0 (Men's SWL champs)
2007–2008 Records	23-6 (SWL Champs) (CIF quarterfinalist)	11-1 (Undefeated SWL Champs) (CIF quarterfinalist)	21-8 (SWL Champs) (CIF first round loss)	23–7 (SWL Champs) (CIF semi-finalists)	9-14-3	21-3-1 (SWL Champs) (CIF first round loss)	6–0 (Men's SWL champs)
2006–2007 Records	28-4 (SWL Champs) (CIF CHAMPS)	11-1 (Undefeated SWL Champs) (CIF quarterfinalist)	15-14 (CIF quarterfinalist)	21-7 (SWL Champs) (CIF first round loss)	4-17-3	23–4 (SWL Champs) (CIF quarterfinalist)	7-0 (Men's SWL champs)

== Notable alumni ==
- Curtis Bolton (class of 2014), American football linebacker for the Miami Dolphins
- Ambyr Childers, American actress
- Su'a Cravens, former American football strong safety
- Taylor Edwards (class of 2010), professional softball player
- Javelin Guidry, American Football Cornerback for the Philadelphia Eagles
- Ryan Navarro, American football long snapper
- Michael Norman (class of 2016), American track and field sprinter
- Bradley Randle (class of 2009), American football running back for the Minnesota Vikings
- Sierra Romero, Mexican-American former collegiate four-time All-American, pro All-Star right-handed hitting softball player
- Sydney Romero, an American softball player
- Khalil Shakir, American Football Wide Receiver for the Buffalo Bills
- Nick Stevens, American football quarterback
- A. J. Whitaker, American professional volleyball player

== Feeder schools ==
- Elementary: Rail Ranch, E. Hale Curran, Avaxat, Antelope Hills, Lisa J. Mails, Alta Murrieta, Buchanan and Monte Vista Elementary Schools
- Middle: Dorothy McElhinney, Warm Springs, and Shivela Middle School
