= Drew Steckenrider =

American baseball pitcher (born 1991)

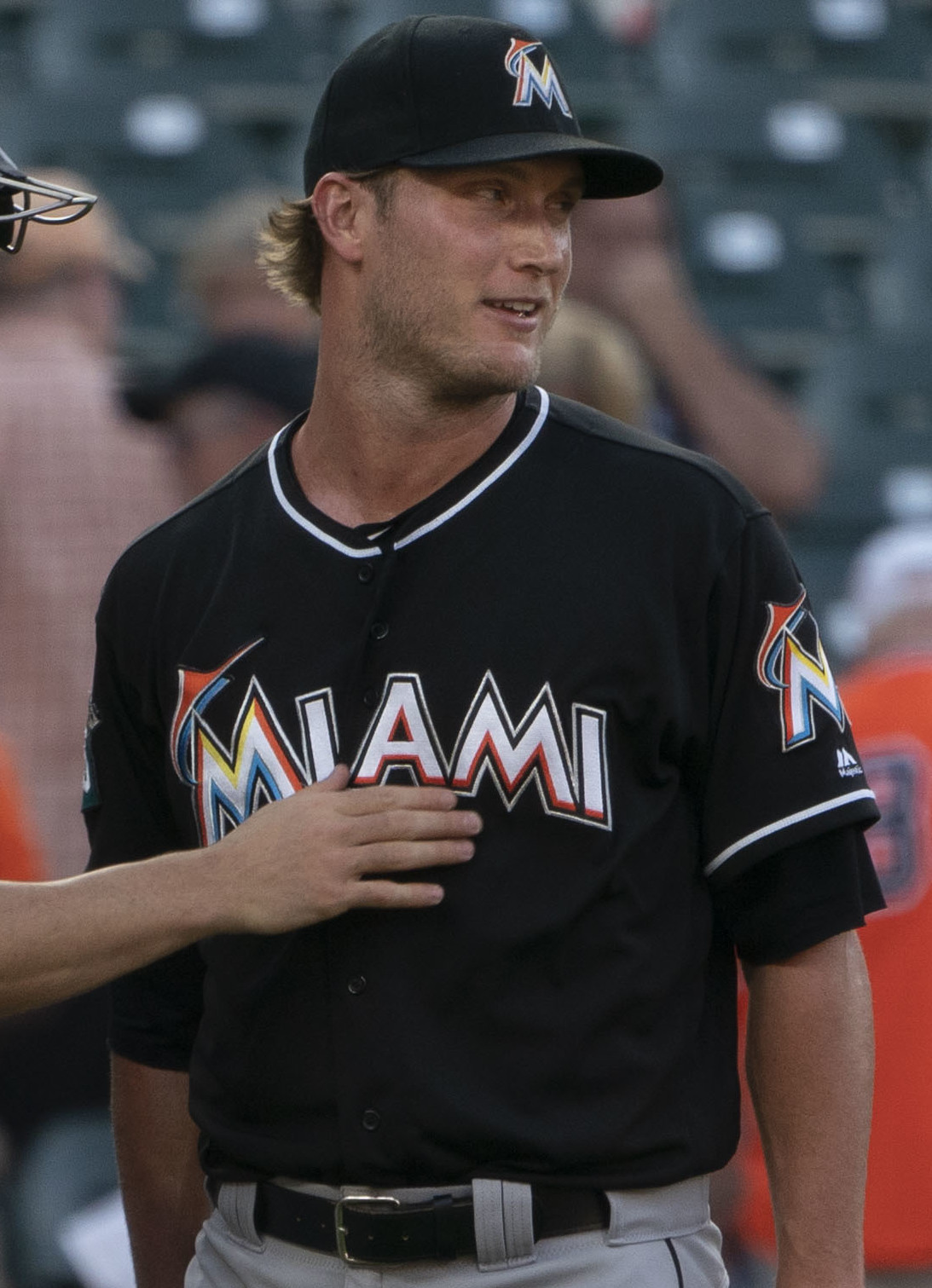
- Steckenrider with the Miami Marlins in 2018
- Pitcher
- Born: January 10, 1991 (age 35); Atlanta, Georgia, U.S.
- Batted: Right Threw: Right

MLB debut
- May 24, 2017, for the Miami Marlins

Last MLB appearance
- May 24, 2022, for the Seattle Mariners

MLB statistics
- Win–loss record: 10–11
- Earned run average: 3.27
- Strikeouts: 210
- Stats at Baseball Reference

Teams
- Miami Marlins (2017–2019); Seattle Mariners (2021–2022)

Andrew Paul Steckenrider (born January 10, 1991) is an American former professional baseball pitcher. He has previously played in Major League Baseball (MLB) for the Miami Marlins and Seattle Mariners.

== Career ==
=== Miami Marlins ===
Steckenrider attended Greater Atlanta Christian School in Norcross, Georgia and played college baseball at the University of Tennessee. In 2011, he played collegiate summer baseball with the Brewster Whitecaps of the Cape Cod Baseball League. He was drafted by the Miami Marlins in the eighth round of the 2012 Major League Baseball draft and he signed.

After signing, Steckenrider made his professional debut that same year for the Jamestown Jammers and spent the whole season there, going 1-2 with a 3.72 ERA in ten games (eight starts). In 2013, he played for the Greensboro Grasshoppers where he pitched to a 1-1 record and 4.58 ERA before he underwent Tommy John surgery in May. In 2014, Steckenrider made one appearance, a rehab start, for the GCL Marlins in which he pitched one scoreless inning. In 2015, he pitched for Greensboro and the Jupiter Hammerheads where he compiled a 5-6 record and 3.00 ERA in 25 games (13 starts), and in 2016 he played with Jupiter, the Jacksonville Jumbo Shrimp, and the New Orleans Zephyrs where he was 1-1 with a 2.08 ERA and 0.85 WHIP in 40 relief appearances. The Marlins added Steckenrider to their 40-man roster after the 2016 season.

Steckenrider began 2017 with New Orleans. On May 23, 2017, he was called up to the majors to replace David Phelps on the roster, who was placed on the bereavement list. He made his major league debut the following day with one scoreless inning of work, striking out one. Once Phelps returned from the bereavement list on May 26, Steckenrider was optioned back to New Orleans. However, by July of that season he had secured a role on the Marlins active 25 man roster as a relief pitcher. At seasons end, he held Miami's lowest ERA at 2.34 with a 1-1 record and 54 strikeouts in 34.2 innings pitched over 37 major league games. Steckenrider continued with Miami until he became a free agent on October 29, 2020.

=== Seattle Mariners ===
On November 10, 2020, Steckenrider signed with the Seattle Mariners and was a non-roster invitee in spring training. On March 31, 2021, Steckenrider was selected to the active 25 man opening day roster in the Mariners bullpen. His dominant 2021 campaign included an evening on August 8 where he primarily used his 97 mph fastball to close out the last 2 innings in Yankee Stadium in impressive style, highlighted by a nasty game ending breaking ball to strike out legendary slugger Aaron Judge and complete the Mariners first shutout in Yankee Stadium since 2012. During that 2021 Mariners 90 win season he led the team with 67 2/3 relief innings pitched and 14 saves, while recording 58 strikeouts and a 2.00 ERA, the 6th-lowest ERA in Mariners franchise history among pitchers with at least 60.0 innings pitched.

Steckenrider began the 2022 season with the Mariners, but was optioned to the Triple-A Tacoma Rainiers on May 26 after 16 relief appearances with 1 save. He was designated for assignment on June 11, after the Mariners acquired Kevin Padlo. On June 14, Steckenrider cleared waivers and was sent outright to Triple-A Tacoma.

=== Oakland Athletics ===
On February 12, 2023, Steckenrider signed a minor league contract with the Oakland Athletics organization, and was a non-roster invitee to spring training camp. He was put on the restricted list on March 16, and did not throw a pitch in 2023 or 2024.
