= Murrieta Valley Unified School District =

Public school district in Riverside County, California

Address
- 41870 McAlby Court Murrieta, California; United States

District information
- Type: Public
- Grades: K–12
- NCES District ID: 0600029

Students and staff
- Students: 22,317 (2023-2024)
- Teachers: 929.59 (FTE)
- Staff: 1,021.72 (FTE)
- Student–teacher ratio: 24.01:1

Other information
- Website: www.murrieta.k12.ca.us

The Murrieta Valley Unified School District is the public school system in the city of Murrieta, California. It is the third-largest public school district in Riverside County.

== High schools ==
- Murrieta Mesa High School
- Murrieta Valley High School
- Vista Murrieta High School
- Murrieta Canyon Academy/Murrieta Options

== Middle Schools ==
- Dorothy McElhinney Middle School
- Shivela Middle School
- Thompson Middle School
- Warm Springs Middle School

== Elementary Schools ==
- Alta Murrieta Elementary School
- Antelope Hills Elementary School
- Avaxat Elementary School
- Buchanan Elementary School
- Cole Canyon Elementary School
- E. Hale Curran Elementary School
- Lisa J. Mails Elementary School
- Monte Vista Elementary School
- Murrieta Elementary School
- Rail Ranch Elementary School
- Tovashal Elementary School
