= Vinny Nittoli =

American baseball player (born 1990)

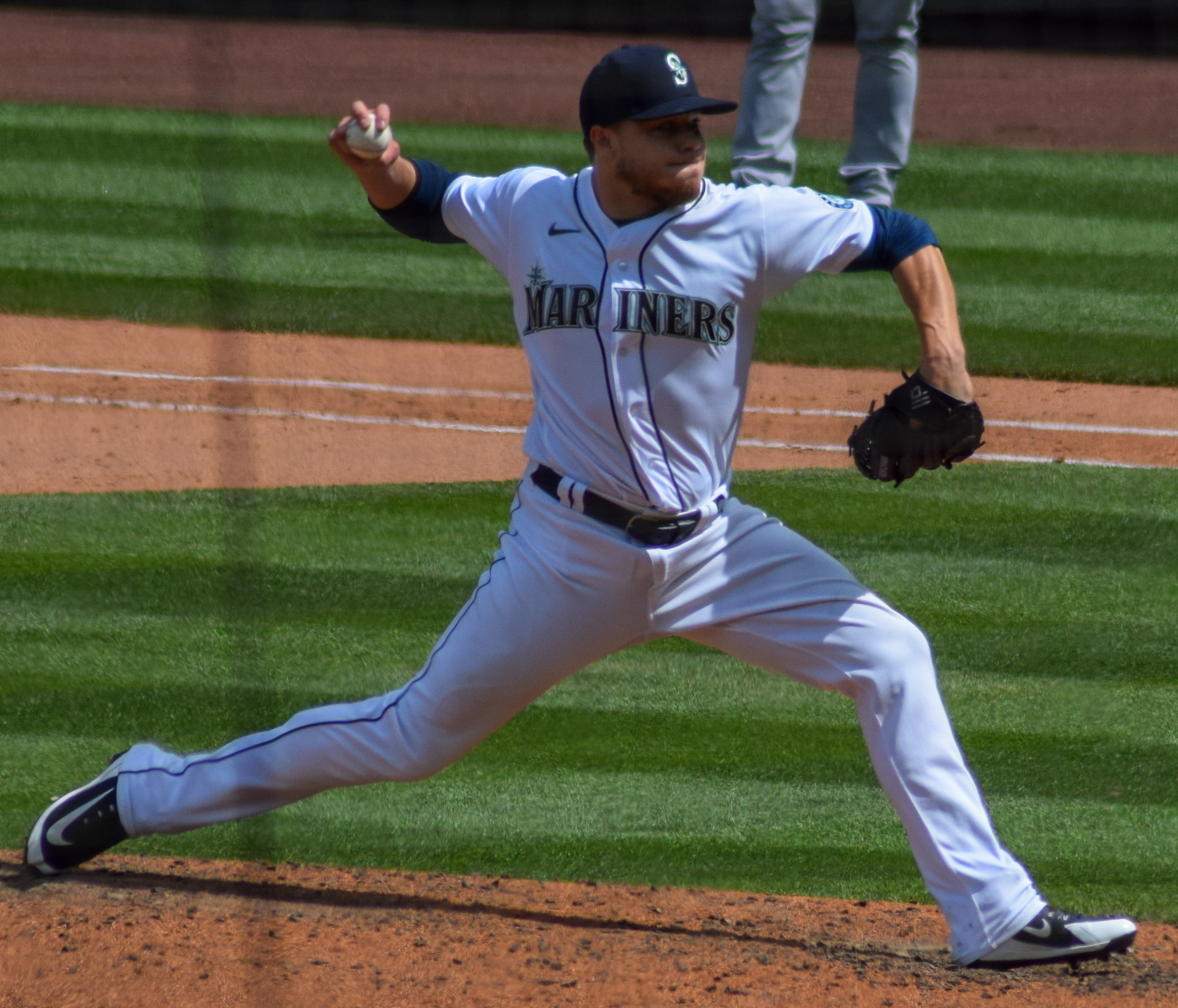
- Nittoli's Major League debut in 2021

Free agent
- Pitcher
- Born: November 11, 1990 (age 36); Tempe, Arizona, U.S.
- Bats: Right Throws: Right

MLB debut
- June 23, 2021, for the Seattle Mariners

MLB statistics (through 2024 season)
- Win–loss record: 0–1
- Earned run average: 2.41
- Strikeouts: 13
- Stats at Baseball Reference

Teams
- Seattle Mariners (2021); Philadelphia Phillies (2022); New York Mets (2023); Oakland Athletics (2024); Baltimore Orioles (2024)

Michael Vincent Nittoli (born November 11, 1990) is an American professional baseball pitcher who is a free agent. He has previously played in Major League Baseball (MLB) for the Seattle Mariners, Philadelphia Phillies, New York Mets, Oakland Athletics, and Baltimore Orioles. He made his MLB debut in 2021.

Nittoli was drafted by the Mariners in the 25th round of the 2014 MLB draft out of Xavier University. Prior to attending Xavier, Nittoli grew up in the Pittsburgh area and attended Pine-Richland High School. Listed at 6 feet 1 inch (1.85 m) and 210 pounds (95 kg), he throws and bats right-handed.

== Career ==
=== Seattle Mariners ===
Nittoli was drafted by the Seattle Mariners in the 25th round, 741st overall, of the 2014 Major League Baseball draft out of Xavier University. He made his professional debut with the Low-A Everett AquaSox, pitching to a 4.03 ERA in 12 appearances. The next year, Nittoli played for the Arizona League Mariners, posting a 3.60 ERA with 7 strikeouts in 10.0 innings pitched. He split the 2016 season between the Single-A Clinton LumberKings and the High-A Bakersfield Blaze, accumulating a 5–5 record and 3.88 ERA in 40 appearances between the two teams. On April 14, 2017, Nittoli was released by the Mariners organization.

=== St. Paul Saints ===
After his release from the Mariners organization, Nittoli's father's friend referred him to former teammate George Tsamis, who was the manager of the St. Paul Saints of the American Association of Independent Professional Baseball at the time. After a phone call with Tsamis, Nittoli signed with the Saints. In 34 games out of the bullpen in 2017, Nittoli recorded a 2–3 record and 3.33 ERA with 55 strikeouts in 46.0 innings of work. In 2018, Nittoli converted to a starter, and pitched to a 3–2 record and 3.21 ERA in 5 starts for the Saints, striking out 38 in 28.0 innings.

=== Arizona Diamondbacks ===
On December 13, 2018, Nittoli signed a minor league contract with the Arizona Diamondbacks organization that included an invitation to Spring Training. He did not make the club and was assigned to the Triple-A Reno Aces to begin the 2019 season. Nittoli struggled to an 0–4 record and 9.50 ERA in 5 games before being released on May 11, 2019.

=== Toronto Blue Jays ===
On May 18, 2019, Nittoli signed a minor league contract with the Toronto Blue Jays organization. He finished the year with the Double–A New Hampshire Fisher Cats, logging a 3–2 record and 3.80 ERA with 40 strikeouts across 29 games. Nittoli did not play in a game in 2020 due to the cancellation of the minor league season because of the COVID-19 pandemic. On November 2, 2020, he elected free agency.

=== Seattle Mariners (second stint) ===
On November 6, 2020, Nittoli signed a minor league contract with the Seattle Mariners organization. He was invited to Spring Training, but did not make the club and was assigned to the Triple-A Tacoma Rainiers to begin the season. After posting a 3.50 ERA in 11 games with Tacoma, on June 18, 2021, Nittoli was selected to the 40-man roster and promoted to the major leagues for the first time. He made his MLB debut on June 23, pitching one inning against the Colorado Rockies. In the game, he notched his first MLB strikeout, punching out Rockies infielder Chris Owings. On July 27, Nittoli was designated for assignment by the Mariners. On July 30, Nittoli was outrighted back to Triple-A Tacoma. On August 27, Nittoli was released by the Mariners.

=== Minnesota Twins ===
On August 28, 2021, Nittoli signed a minor league contract with the Minnesota Twins. He made seven appearances for the Triple-A St. Paul Saints, posting an 0–1 record and 2.45 ERA with 10 strikeouts and one save across 7 1/3 innings pitched. Nittoli elected free following the season agency on November 7.

=== New York Yankees ===
On November 8, 2021, Nittoli signed a minor league contract with the New York Yankees organization. He made 22 appearances (four starts) for the Triple-A Scranton/Wilkes-Barre RailRiders, compiling a 4–1 record and 3.44 ERA with 44 strikeouts across 36 2/3 innings pitched. Nittoli opted out of his contract and became a free agent on July 16, 2022.

=== Toronto Blue Jays (second stint) ===
On July 21, 2022, Nittoli signed a minor league contract with the Toronto Blue Jays organization. In 10 appearances for the Triple–A Buffalo Bisons, he recorded a 2.79 ERA with 15 strikeouts and 2 saves in 9 2/3 innings pitched. On August 28, Nittoli triggered the opt–out clause in his contract.

=== Philadelphia Phillies ===
On August 30, 2022, Nittoli was traded to the Philadelphia Phillies. On September 1, Philadelphia selected him to their major league roster. Nittoli made two scoreless appearances for Philadelphia, but spent the majority of his stint with the Triple–A Lehigh Valley IronPigs, where he logged a 7.94 ERA across five games.

On January 4, 2023, Nittoli was designated for assignment following the team's acquisition of Erich Uelmen. On January 9, Nittoli was released.

=== Chicago Cubs ===
On January 12, 2023, Nittoli signed a minor league contract with the Chicago Cubs organization. In 16 appearances for the Triple-A Iowa Cubs, he registered a 3.48 ERA with 22 strikeouts in 20 2/3 innings pitched. On June 1, Nittoli exercised the opt-out clause in his contract, giving the Cubs 48 hours to add him to their 40-man roster or grant him his release.

=== New York Mets ===
On June 2, 2023, Nittoli was traded to the New York Mets in exchange for cash considerations. The following day, Nittoli was selected to the major league roster and optioned to the Triple-A Syracuse Mets. In three appearances for New York, he recorded a 2.45 ERA with three strikeouts in 3 2/3 innings of work. Following the season on October 20, Nittoli was removed from the 40–man roster and sent outright to Triple–A Syracuse. He elected free agency on October 24.

=== Oakland Athletics ===
On October 27, 2023, Nittoli signed a minor league contract with the Oakland Athletics organization. In 20 appearances for the Triple–A Las Vegas Aviators, he compiled a 2.70 ERA with 36 strikeouts and 3 saves across 23 1/3 innings pitched. On June 4, 2024, the Athletics selected Nittoli's contract, adding him to their active roster. In seven games for Oakland, he recorded a 2.25 ERA with five strikeouts across eight innings of work. On June 21, Nittoli was designated for assignment by the Athletics. He elected free agency after clearing waivers on June 23.

=== Baltimore Orioles ===
On June 27, 2024, Nittoli signed a major league contract with the Chicago Cubs. However, he was designated for assignment the following day without pitching for the team. Nittoli cleared waivers and was sent outright to the Triple–A Iowa Cubs on July 1. He subsequently rejected the assignment and elected free agency.

On July 2, 2024, Nittoli signed a minor league contract with the Baltimore Orioles. After three appearances for the Triple–A Norfolk Tides, the Orioles selected Nittoli's contract, adding him to their active roster on July 13. He made two scoreless appearances for the Orioles, striking out three in four innings of work. Nittoli was designated for assignment following the acquisition of Zach Eflin on July 26. He cleared waivers on August 1, but elected free agency in lieu of an outright assignment.

=== New York Mets (second stint) ===
On August 10, 2024, Nittoli signed a minor league contract with the New York Mets. In 3 games for the Triple–A Syracuse Mets, he struggled to a 9.82 ERA with 3 strikeouts over 3 2/3 innings. On August 29, Nittoli opted out of his contract and elected free agency.

=== Milwaukee Brewers ===
On September 30, 2024, Nittoli signed a minor league contract with the Milwaukee Brewers that included an invitation to spring training. He made 27 appearances for the Triple-A Nashville Sounds in 2025, posting an 0–1 record and 3.86 ERA with 37 strikeouts over 28 innings of work. On July 15, 2025, Nittoli was released by the Brewers after triggering the opt-out clause in his contract.

=== Baltimore Orioles (second stint) ===
On July 21, 2025, Nittoli signed a minor league contract with the Baltimore Orioles. In 10 appearances for the Triple-A Norfolk Tides, he struggled to a 6.35 ERA with nine strikeouts across 11 1/3 innings pitched. Nittoli was released by the Orioles organization on August 30.

=== Boston Red Sox ===
On February 2, 2026, Nittoli signed a minor league contract with the Boston Red Sox. On March 22, it was announced that Nittoli had undergone a season-ending internal brace procedure to repair ligament damage in his pitching elbow. Two days later, Nittoli was released by the Red Sox organization.

== International career ==
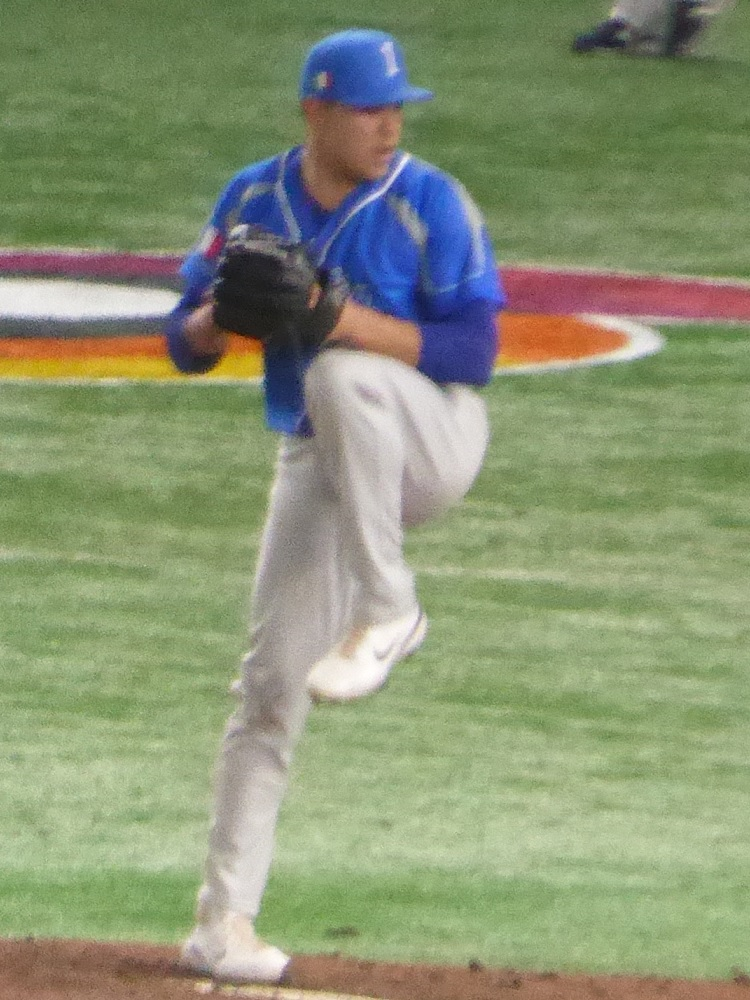
Nittoli with the WBC Italy national team at Tokyo Dome on March 16, 2023

Nittoli played for the Italy national baseball team at the 2023 World Baseball Classic.
