= Bridgewater-Raritan High School =

School district in Somerset County, New Jersey, United States

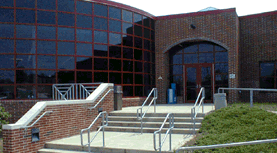

Location
- 600 Garretson Road; Bridgewater Township, Somerset County, New Jersey 08807; United States; 40.59501°N 74.635904°W

Information
- Type: Public high school
- Motto: Pursuing Excellence in Education
- Established: September 1959; reopened 1994
- NCES School ID: 340228000173
- Principal: Daniel Hemberger
- Faculty: 205.0 FTEs
- Grades: 9th-12th
- Enrollment: 2,673 (as of 2024–25)
- Student to teacher ratio: 13.0:1
- Colors: Black; White; Silver
- Athletics conference: Skyland Conference (general); Big Central Football Conference (football)
- Team name: Panthers
- Newspaper: The Prowler
- Yearbook: Epic
- Website: School website

Bridgewater-Raritan High School (BRHS) is a four-year comprehensive public high school. It is the lone secondary school of the Bridgewater-Raritan Regional School District serving students in ninth through twelfth grades from Bridgewater Township and Raritan in Somerset County, in the U.S. state of New Jersey. The school has been recognized by the National Blue Ribbon Schools Program, the highest award an American school can receive.

As of the 2024–25 school year, the school had an enrollment of 2,673 students and 205.0 classroom teachers (on an FTE basis), for a student–teacher ratio of 13.0:1. There were 329 students (12.3% of enrollment) eligible for free lunch and 75 (2.8% of students) eligible for reduced-cost lunch. Based on 2021-22 data from the New Jersey Department of Education, it was the sixth-largest high school in the state and one of 29 schools with more than 2,000 students.

For the 2024–25 school year, the school had an average SAT score of 1214, which was above the national and state average.

== History and symbols ==
Until the 1950s, high school students from the Bridgewater-Raritan Regional School District attended Somerville High School and Bound Brook High School. With the opening of the high school, the Somerville district saw the loss of 370 Bridgewater students that had attended the district's high school.

Bridgewater-Raritan High School was opened in September 1959, with students in ninth and tenth grades; those students moving into eleventh and twelfth grades remained at Somerville High School, with the final set of Bridgewater and Raritan students graduating with the Class of 1961. Norman A. Gathany serving as the school's first principal. Increasing enrollments in the early 1960s led to the construction of a second high school in 1966, which was named Bridgewater-Raritan High School East (the Minutemen), while the original high school was renamed Bridgewater-Raritan High School West (the Golden Falcons). Declining enrollments led to their consolidation into a single high school during the 1990s. The former High School West was expanded and updated over a period of several years, during which all of the district's high school students attended what had been High School East. The former High School West reopened in 1992 as the new consolidated Bridgewater-Raritan High School, while the High School East became the district's middle school.

The mascot of BRHS is the panther. BRHS's school colors were previously black and silver, with red serving as an accent color, but now are primarily only black and white.

The high school's football field is "Basilone Field", named for John Basilone, a World War II recipient of the Medal of Honor who grew up in Raritan. On the wall of the field house next to the field is a mural honoring Basilone.

In December 2009, two minors, a 16-year-old Bridgewater-Raritan student and a 17-year-old student from nearby Immaculata High School, were arrested in connection with an alleged Columbine-like plan to attack the school.

== Awards, recognition and rankings ==
During the 1999–2000 school year, Bridgewater-Raritan High School was recognized with the National Blue Ribbon School Award of Excellence by the United States Department of Education.

For the 1997–98 school year, Bridgewater-Raritan High School was named a "Star School" by the New Jersey Department of Education, the highest honor that a New Jersey school can achieve.

BRHS is one of only three high schools in the state to have received both awards.

In the 2011 "Ranking America's High Schools" issue by The Washington Post, the school was ranked 36th in New Jersey and 1,190th nationwide. In Newsweek's May 22, 2007 issue, ranking the country's top high schools, Bridgewater-Raritan High School was listed in 983rd place, the 29th-highest ranked school in New Jersey.

The school was the 76th-ranked public high school in New Jersey out of 339 schools statewide in New Jersey Monthly magazine's September 2014 cover story on the state's "Top Public High Schools", using a new ranking methodology. The school had been ranked 113th in the state of 328 schools in 2012, after being ranked 67th in 2010 out of 322 schools listed. The magazine ranked the school 91st in 2008 out of 316 schools. The school was also ranked 83rd in the magazine's September 2006 issue, which surveyed 316 schools across the state. In previous years, the school had been ranked in the 20s in the same ranking. Following publication of the 2006 New Jersey Monthly article, the school's principal issued a public statement explaining changes in the magazine's ranking methods that altered the school's standing, and generally criticizing the ranking methodology. Schooldigger.com ranked the school tied for 83d out of 381 public high schools statewide in its 2011 rankings (a decrease of 20 positions from the 2010 ranking) which were based on the combined percentage of students classified as proficient or above proficient on the mathematics (89.0%) and language arts literacy (96.1%) components of the High School Proficiency Assessment (HSPA).

In its 2013 report on "America's Best High Schools", The Daily Beast ranked the school 442nd in the nation among participating public high schools and 37th among schools in New Jersey.

In Newsweek's listing of "America's Best High Schools 2016", the school was ranked 108th out of 500 best high schools in the country; it was ranked 20th among all high schools in New Jersey and seventh among the state's non-magnet schools.

In 2023, the school ranked in the top 42 schools in New Jersey, as well as in the top 1000 ranked schools nationally, according to a report by U.S. News & World Report.

== Music ==
=== Choir ===
There are three curricular choirs: the Mixed Choir and two choirs that require an audition Select Treble Ensemble and Symphonic Choir. There are three extra-curricular ensembles, Lorelei, Ensembros (all male a cappella), and the Glee Club. Choirs at BRHS often collaborate with other ensembles.

=== Orchestra ===
There are two curricular orchestral ensembles, the Concert Orchestra and the auditioned Symphonic Orchestra. The orchestras travel the region attending various festivals and events, presenting serious orchestral literature, including performing movements from Sibelius' Fifth Symphony. The orchestra has performed at Carnegie Hall with the school's wind ensemble as part of the 2012 Eastern Wind Symphony Symphonic Gala.

=== Band ===
The school's wind ensemble has performed in the State Gala concert numerous times within the past decade. The symphonic band and wind ensemble have performed at Carnegie Hall for the Eastern Wind Symphony Symphonic Gala in March 2013. Since 2002 BRHS has won three NJAJE state jazz band titles, eight NJ state marching band championships, four BOA regional class championships. In the fall of 2012, the BRHS marching band finished 18th in the nation as BOA semi-finalist and was awarded the national The Albert J Castronovo Esprit de Corps Award, the highest placement of a band from New Jersey in the history of Bands of America.

== Extracurricular clubs ==
The school offers many clubs and activities, such as Model United Nations and Future Business Leaders Of America. The Model United Nations team has won several awards at multiple international conferences, and host their own home conference in the spring. The Forensics team has had National Championship qualifiers, as well as numerous state champions and one national champion. The Forensics team has been ranked fourth in the state of New Jersey.

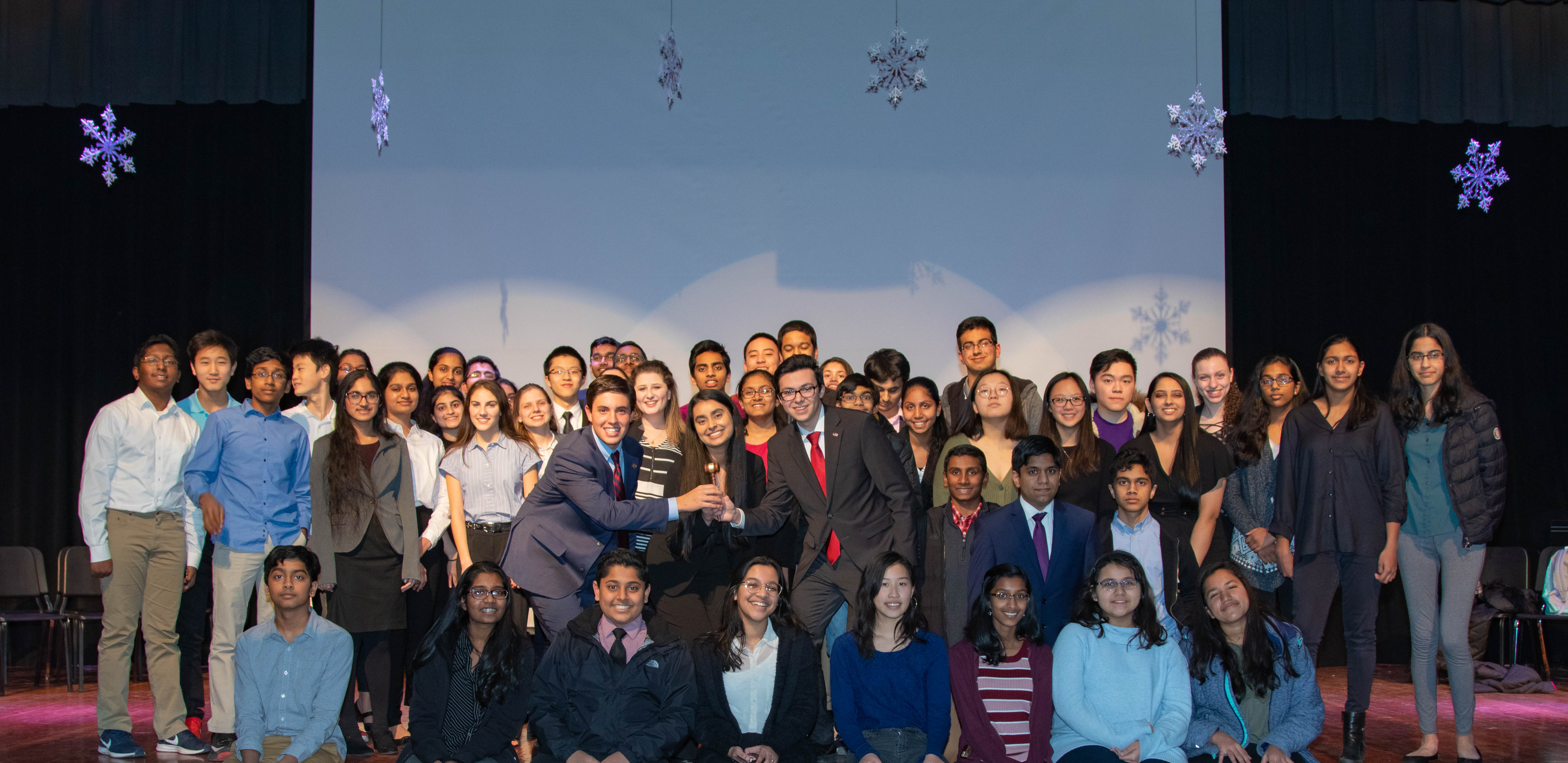
The BR Model United Nations team posing after the completion of their second annual home conference, BRMUNC II

BRHS also is the home of Team 303 in the FIRST Robotics Competition, TEST Team 303. At the 2007 FIRST Robotics Challenge World Championships in Atlanta, Team 303 ranked 23 in their division out of the 1500+ teams from across the globe that had attended the event. At the 2010 New Jersey Regional Competition, Team 303 were semifinalists. In the 2011 season the team won both the New Jersey and Philadelphia Regional Competitions, and were division quarter-finalists at the championships in St. Louis. In 2013, Team 303 ranked third in the Newton Division, and went on to win the Division against the number one alliance. The following year, Team 303 won the Chairman's Award at the Clifton District Event and at the Mid Atlantic Regional Championship, advancing them to the World Championship.

BRTV is the school's television program, produced in the school's own television studio, that goes live on weekdays to provide announcements and information about school events.

== Athletics ==
The Bridgewater-Raritan High School Panthers compete in the Skyland Conference, which is comprised of public and private high schools in Hunterdon, Somerset and Warren counties in west Central Jersey, and operates under the jurisdiction of the New Jersey State Interscholastic Athletic Association (NJSIAA). With 2,072 students in grades 10–12, the school was classified by the NJSIAA for the 2019–20 school year as Group IV for most athletic competition purposes, which included schools with an enrollment of 1,060 to 5,049 students in that grade range. The football team competes in Division 5B of the Big Central Football Conference, which includes 60 public and private high schools in Hunterdon, Middlesex, Somerset, Union and Warren counties, which are broken down into 10 divisions by size and location. The school was classified by the NJSIAA as Group V North for football for 2024–2026, which included schools with 1,317 to 5,409 students.

The school was recognized as the Group IV winner of the NJSIAA ShopRite Cup in 2005–06. The award recognized the school for achieving first-place finishes in boys' soccer, boys' swimming, boys' tennis and boys' volleyball; second place in field hockey; and third place in boys' lacrosse (tie), girls' soccer (tie) and girls' volleyball (tie); plus bonus points for no disqualifications in two of three seasons.

The boys' basketball team won the Group IV state championship in 1965 (against Bloomfield High School in the finals), won the Group III title in 1987 (vs. Malcolm X Shabazz High School) and 1988 (vs. Shabazz), and won the Group II title in 1989 (vs. Abraham Clark High School). The 1965 team won the Group IV title with a 63–55 victory against Bloomfield in the championship game played in front of 10,000 spectators at Atlantic City Convention Hall. The 1987 team finished the season with a record of 29-1 after defeating Shabazz by a score of 76–57, led by 28 points from Eric Murdock, in the championship game played at the Louis Brown Athletic Center.

The 1976 girls' basketball team won the Group IV state title in 1976, defeating Bayonne High School by a score of 60–51 in the tournament final. Kristen Helmstetter broke the girls' basketball record for most points in her high school career, topping her coach's previous record with 1,476 career points.

The boys' soccer team has won the Group IV state championship in 1998 (as co-champion with Columbia High School) and 2005 (vs. Shawnee High School). The team won the 2005 Group IV state championship, finishing the season with a program-best 23 wins and one loss, a ranking of second in the state and a national ranking of 24th. In 2006, the boys' soccer team repeated as Group IV North II state sectional champions, defeating Elizabeth High School 3–0. In 2017, the boys' soccer team finished with an undefeated season. They were co-champions in the 2017 Somerset County Tournament and were also North II Group IV sectional winners. They lost to eventual state champions Kearny on penalties in the semi-finals.

The Bridgewater-Raritan East football team won the NJSIAA Central Jersey Group III state sectional championships in 1974 and the Central Jersey Group II title in 1989. The 1974 team, which featured Jeffrey Vanderbeek as a running back, won the first Central Jersey Group III sectional title of the playoff era with a 20–6 victory against Carteret High School in a game played indoors at the Atlantic City Convention Hall. The Bridgewater-Raritan football team made a run in the 2015 playoffs. Carrying a perfect 11–0 record to the Group V North state championship game, they played and lost to another undefeated team, the Westfield High School Blue Devils.

The boys' volleyball team won the New Jersey State Volleyball Coaches Association Tournament (the predecessor to the NJSIAA tournament) in 1989 (defeating St. Joseph High School in the tournament final), 1990 (vs. St. Josephs), 1991 (vs. Fair Lawn High School), 1993 (vs. Memorial High School of West New York) and 1994 (vs. Memorial of West New York). The team has won the NJSIAA state championship in 2005 (vs. Clifton High School) and 2015 (vs. Southern Regional High School). The seven combined state titles are the most of any school in the state. The team won the 2005 state championship over Clifton High School, 25–20, 21–25, 25–20. In 2015 the team was recognized by NJ.com as its team of the year after winning the Group IV title against Southern Regional and finishing the season with a 37–1 record.

The boys' tennis team won the 2005 North II, Group IV state sectional championship with a 4–1 win against Westfield High School. The tennis team won the 2006 Group IV state championship, defeating Cherry Hill High School East 3–2 in the semifinals and West Windsor-Plainsboro High School South 3–2 in the finals to take the title.

The girls' tennis team won the Group IV state championship in 2007 (vs. Bergen County Academies in the group finals), 2011 (vs. Livingston High School), and 2018 (vs. Montgomery High School). The 2007 girls' tennis team won the North II, Group IV state sectional championship with a 5–0 win over J. P. Stevens High School in the tournament final. The team moved on to win the Group IV state championship with a 3–2 win over Montgomery High School in the semifinals and Bergen County Technical High School in the finals by a 4–1 score. The 2011 girl tennis team, although "relatively inexperienced," won the Group IV state championship over Livingston High School (4-1). The 2011 team finished the season with a 23-2 record, with the two losses coming once in the regular season and in the semifinal round of the Tournament of Champions. The 2018 team won the Group IV state championship with a 3–2 win at Mercer County Park over previously undefeated Montgomery High School.

The girls' swimming team won the Division A state championship in 1992 and the Public A championship in 2016, 2017, 2018, and 2019. The boys' swimming team won the Public A championship in 2007, 2011 and 2018. The boys' swimming team won the 2006 Public A state championship over Cherry Hill High School West with a score of 88–82, winning their first state championship after going into the final event in a tie. In back-to-back seasons in 2010 and 2011, the boys' swim team took home the New Jersey state championship trophy, defeating Cherry Hill High School East both years.

The field hockey team won the North I/II Group IV state sectional championship in 2005, the North I Group IV in 2006, 2007, 2011 and 2013, and the North II, Group IV in 2008, 2009, 2012 and 2014. The team was the runner up for the Group IV state championship in 2005, 2006, 2007, 2008, 2009, 2010, 2011, 2012, 2013 and 2014. In 2007, the field hockey team won the North I, Group IV state sectional championship with a 2–0 win over Montclair High School in the tournament final.

In 2003, the girls' soccer team won the North II, Group IV state sectional championship with a win over Roxbury High School and were Group IV state finalist. The girls' soccer team won the North II, Group IV state sectional championship in 2007 with a 2–1 win over Ridge High School in the tournament final. In 2013, the girls' soccer team captured their first ever Group IV state title by defeating defending champion Montgomery High School 1–0. The team ended the season ranked second in New Jersey by The Star-Ledger.

The boys' lacrosse team won the Group IV state title in 2009, 2011, 2012, 2015 and 2022, and won the overall state championship in 1998 (defeating Mountain Lakes High School in the finals), 2011 (vs. Summit High School), 2012 (vs. Delbarton School) and 2015 (vs. Bergen Catholic High School). The program's six group titles are tied for sixth-most in the state. The team won the 2011 Tournament of Champions with a 6–5 win over Summit High School, marking the program's second state title and breaking Summit's 68 game winning streak. The Panthers won their first state lacrosse title in 1998. To begin the 2012 season, the Panthers were ranked 5th in the nation and 1st in the state. They finished the 2012 season undefeated at 21–0, extending their overall winning streak to 36 games. Along the way, the Panthers won their second consecutive Somerset County, state Group IV and NJ Tournament of Champions titles. With a 23–0 record, the team was the state's only undefeated team in 2015, winning the Somerset County tournament, Group IV title and the Tournament of Champions with a 16–13 win against Bergen Catholic High School. In May 2018, the boys' lacrosse coach earned his 500th win as head coach, making him the third coach in the state to reach this milestone in the sport, having compiled a career record of 500 wins and 211 losses since being hired in 1980.

The girls' lacrosse team won the Group IV state championship in 2009 (defeating Washington Township High School in the tournament final) and 2017 (vs. Eastern Regional High School). The team won the Group IV state title in 2017 with a 16–4 win against Eastern Regional in the championship game and went on to win the program's first Tournament of Champions with a victory in the finals against Oak Knoll School of the Holy Child.

The boys' hockey team won the Group IV state championship in 2026 (defeating Ridgewood High School 2-0). Bridgewater finished their historic season with a 23-3-1 record.

== Administration ==
The school's principal is Daniel Hemberger. His core administration team includes four assistant principals.

== Notable alumni ==
Alumni of Bridgewater-Raritan High School and its predecessor schools Bridgewater-Raritan High School East and West are included.

- Nestor Cabrera (born 2003), professional soccer player who plays as a midfielder for New York Cosmos
- Catherine Caro (born 1995, class of 2013), field hockey player on the United States women's national field hockey team
- Fousheé (born 1996), singer-songwriter and guitarist
- Paul Heck (born 1967), music producer and artist liaison for the Red Hot Organization; independent sound manager
- Matt Kassel (born 1989, class of 2008), midfielder who played for the Philadelphia Union in the MLS
- Andy Kessler (born 1958), businessman, investor and author
- Paul Laird (born 1958, class of 1976), musicologist at the University of Kansas
- Geraldine Laybourne (born 1947, class of 1965), entrepreneur and former TV executive
- Derek Luke (born 1993), professional soccer player for FC Cincinnati in the United Soccer League
- Juliet Macur, journalist
- Ally Mastroianni, professional lacrosse player for the California Palms of the Women's Lacrosse League
- Eric Murdock (born 1968), former professional basketball player
- Casey Murphy (born 1996), professional soccer player; goalkeeper for North Carolina Courage of the National Women's Soccer League
- Mark Oldman (born 1969), entrepreneur, wine expert and author
- Jack Terricloth (1970–2021), lead singer of the cabaret-punk band The World/Inferno Friendship Society; guitarist and vocalist of Sticks and Stones
- Jeffrey Vanderbeek (born 1957, class of 1975), former owner of the New Jersey Devils
- David Wiesner (born 1956), author and illustrator of children's books and publications, whose work has won several honors, including three Caldecott Medals
- Tom Wilson (born 1967), chairman of the New Jersey Republican State Committee 2004–2009
