= Kevin Padlo =

American baseball player (born 1996)

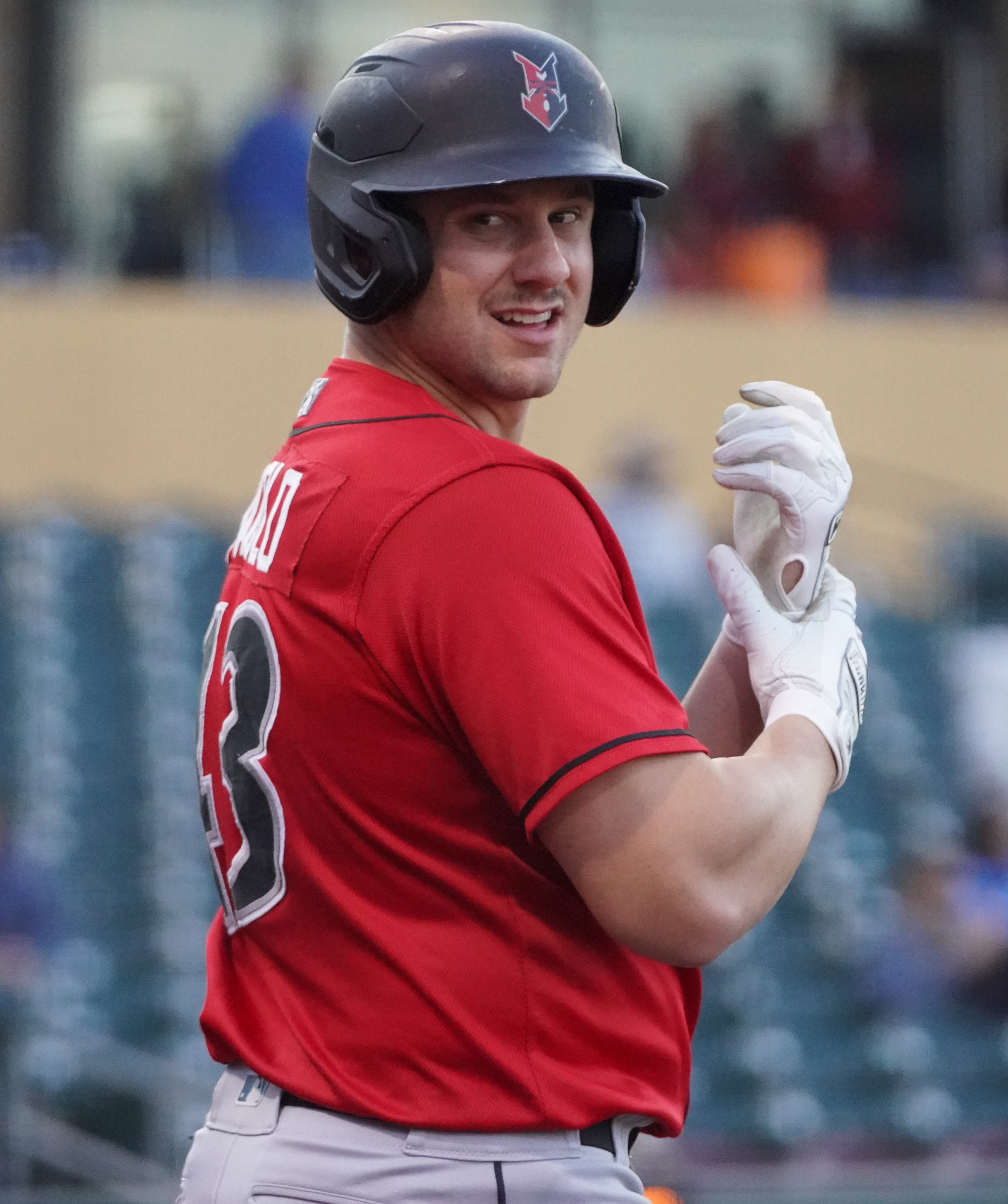
- Padlo with the Indianapolis Indians in 2022
- Third baseman / First baseman
- Born: July 15, 1996 (age 30); Murrieta, California, U.S.
- Batted: Right Threw: Right

MLB debut
- April 6, 2021, for the Tampa Bay Rays

Last appearance
- June 24, 2023, for the Los Angeles Angels

MLB statistics
- Batting average: .111
- Home runs: 0
- Runs batted in: 3
- Stats at Baseball Reference

Teams
- Tampa Bay Rays (2021); Seattle Mariners (2021); San Francisco Giants (2022); Seattle Mariners (2022); Pittsburgh Pirates (2022); Los Angeles Angels (2023)

Kevin Michael Padlo (born July 15, 1996) is an American former professional baseball third baseman. He played in Major League Baseball (MLB) for the Tampa Bay Rays, Seattle Mariners, San Francisco Giants, Pittsburgh Pirates, and Los Angeles Angels. The Colorado Rockies selected Padlo in the fifth round of the 2014 MLB draft.

== Career ==
=== Colorado Rockies ===
Padlo attended Murrieta Valley High School in Murrieta, California, where in addition to playing baseball he was a two-time all-league basketball selection. He committed to attend the University of San Diego on a college baseball scholarship.

The Colorado Rockies selected Padlo in the fifth round of the 2014 Major League Baseball draft. Rather than attend college, Padlo signed with the Rockies, receiving a $650,000 signing bonus.

Padlo made his professional debut with the Grand Junction Rockies of the Rookie-level Pioneer League, batting .300/.421/.594 with eight home runs and 44 RBIs in 48 games. To start 2015, the Rockies assigned Padlo to the Asheville Tourists of the Single-A South Atlantic League. He struggled and was demoted to the Boise Hawks of the Class A short season Northwest League.

Padlo played for the entirety of the Hawks' 2015 season and was named a preseason and midseason Northwest League All-Star. In 27 games for Asheville he batted .145, and in 70 games for Boise he hit .294/.404/.502 with nine home runs and 46 RBIs.

=== Tampa Bay Rays ===
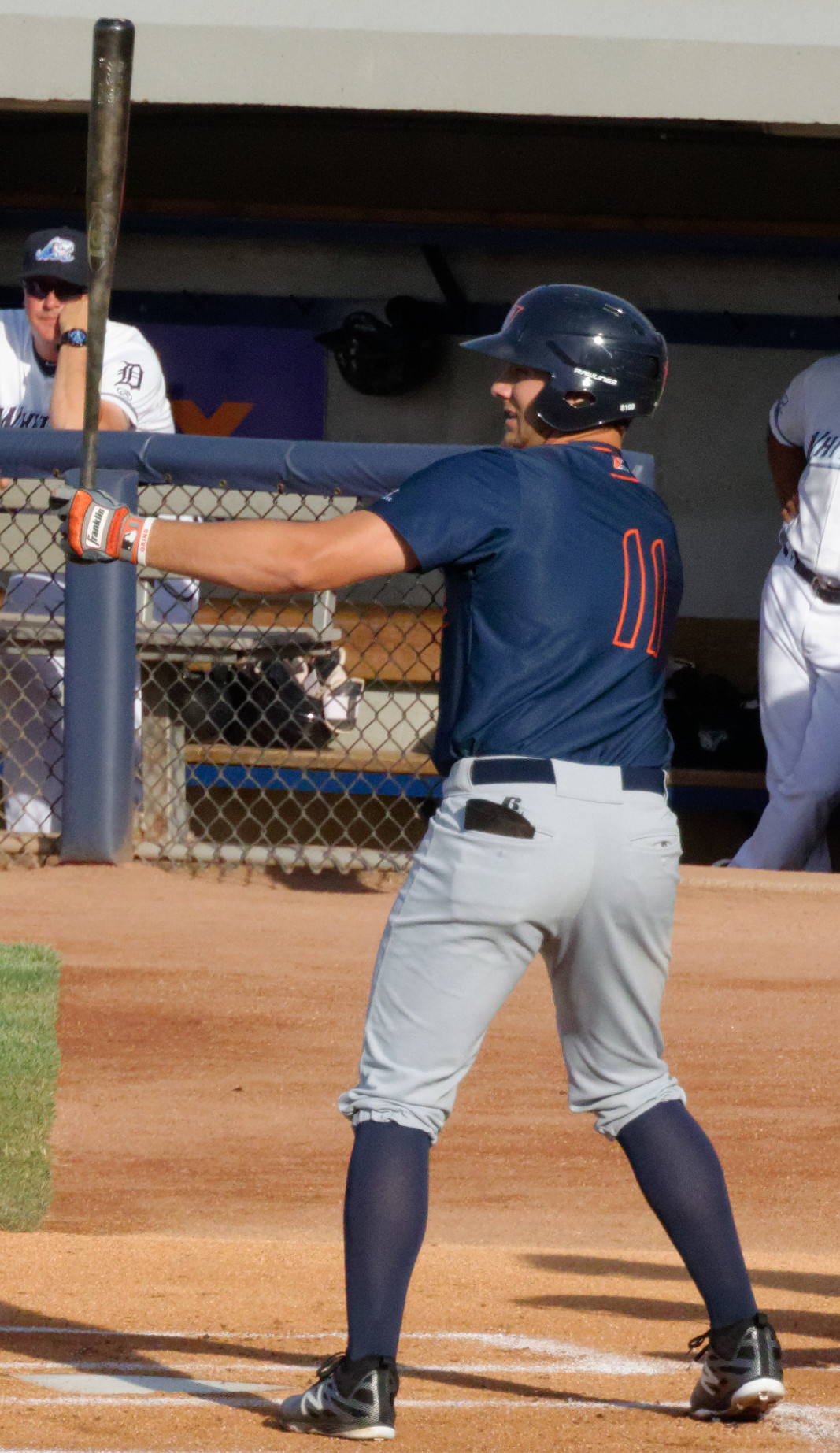
Padlo with the Bowling Green Hot Rods in 2016

On January 28, 2016, the Rockies traded Padlo and Corey Dickerson to the Tampa Bay Rays for Jake McGee and Germán Márquez. Padlo spent the 2016 season with the Bowling Green Hot Rods of the Class A Midwest League, where he batted .230/.358/.413 with 16 home runs and 66 RBIs in 115 games. He spent 2017 with the Charlotte Stone Crabs of the High-A Florida State League, posting a .223 batting average with six home runs and 34 RBIs in 64 games. After the season, Padlo played for the Surprise Saguaros of the Arizona Fall League.

Padlo returned to Charlotte in 2018, batting .223 with eight home runs and 54 RBIs with 115 games. He split the 2019 season between the Double-A Montgomery Biscuits and Triple-A Durham Bulls, hitting a combined .265/.389/.538 with 21 home runs and 62 RBI.

On November 20, 2019, the Rays added Padlo to their 40-man roster to protect him from the Rule 5 draft. He did not play a minor league game in 2020 due to the cancellation of the minor league season because of the COVID-19 pandemic.

On April 6, 2021, Padlo was promoted to the major leagues for the first time to fill in for the injured Kevin Kiermaier. He made his MLB debut that night as the starting third baseman against the Boston Red Sox. After batting .083 over 12 at-bats, Padlo was designated for assignment by the Rays on August 17.

=== Seattle Mariners ===
On August 19, 2021, the Seattle Mariners claimed Padlo off of waivers. He was assigned to the Triple-A Tacoma Rainiers, for whom he batted .298/.388/.596. He played one game for the Mariners, striking out as a pinch hitter on September 3.

Padlo was assigned to Triple-A to begin the 2022 season. After limping to a .173/.317/.327 batting line with Tacoma, he was designated for assignment on April 23, 2022, when the Mariners acquired Stuart Fairchild.

=== San Francisco Giants ===
On April 26, 2022, the Mariners traded Padlo to the San Francisco Giants in exchange for cash considerations. He joined the Triple-A Sacramento River Cats, and hit three home runs in a game on May 1. The Giants promoted Padlo to the major leagues on May 3. He batted 2-for-12 for the Giants in 2022. On June 9, Padlo was designated for assignment by San Francisco after the team acquired Austin Wynns.

=== Seattle Mariners (second stint) ===
Padlo was claimed back by the Seattle Mariners off waivers on June 11, 2022. He briefly returned to the majors, batting 2-for-10 with a double and 5 strikeouts in six games in late June. On August 5, the Mariners designated Padlo for assignment.

=== Pittsburgh Pirates ===
On August 7, 2022, the Pittsburgh Pirates claimed Padlo off waivers. In 3 games for the Pirates, he went 0-for-11. On August 27, Padlo was designated for assignment and was assigned outright to the Triple-A Indianapolis Indians after clearing waivers on August 29. He elected free agency following the season on November 10.

=== Los Angeles Angels ===
On December 15, 2022, Padlo signed a minor league contract with the Los Angeles Angels organization. He was assigned to the Triple-A Salt Lake Bees to begin the 2023 season, where he played in 32 games and batted .273/.396/.555 with 7 home runs and 24 RBI. On June 20, 2023, Padlo was selected to the major league roster following an injury to Anthony Rendon. In 3 games for the Angels, Padlo went 1-for-8 (.125), with a double off of Colorado Rockies starter Kyle Freeland serving as his only hit. On June 24, he was designated for assignment after the team traded for Mike Moustakas. Padlo cleared waivers and was sent outright to Salt Lake on June 30. He was re–selected to the 40-man roster on July 30, 2023, after Taylor Ward suffered facial fractures as a result of being hit by a pitch. Padlo was designated for assignment the next day following the team's acquisition of C. J. Cron and Randal Grichuk. He cleared waivers and was sent outright to Triple-A Salt Lake on August 4. On October 2, Padlo elected free agency.

=== Los Angeles Dodgers ===
On January 26, 2024, Padlo signed a minor league contract with the Los Angeles Dodgers that included an invitation to spring training. He was assigned to the Triple-A Oklahoma City Baseball Club to start the season, for whom he hit .216/.340/.380 with six home runs, 29 RBI, and nine stolen bases across 47 games. The Dodgers released Padlo on May 27.

=== Kansas City Royals ===
On June 5, 2024, Padlo signed a minor league contract with the Kansas City Royals. Padlo played for the Double-A Northwest Arkansas Naturals and Triple-A Omaha Storm Chasers, but hit .143 in 7 games for the Naturals and hit .103 in 12 games for Omaha.

=== Chicago Cubs ===
On August 2, 2024, Padlo was traded to the Chicago Cubs. In 5 games for the Triple-A Iowa Cubs, he went 4-for-28 (.143) with one home run and five RBI. The Cubs released Padlo on August 13.
