= Juliet Macur =

Award-winning American journalist

Juliet Macur is an American journalist.

== Biography ==
Macur is from Bridgewater Township, New Jersey, born to Catholic Polish immigrant parents, and attended Bridgewater-Raritan High School West. She attended Barnard College, graduating with a bachelor's degree in History and Political Science in 1992. She went on to graduate with a master's degree from the Columbia University Graduate School of Journalism in 1997.

While in college Macur was captain of the Columbia University rowing team. After college she rowed competitively for the New York Athletic Club. She went on to work as a sports journalist, reporting on Dallas Cowboys head coach Bill Parcells, the Jacksonville Jaguars, the Olympics and motorsports.

Macur has worked for the Orlando Sentinel and The Dallas Morning News. She moved to The New York Times in 2004. Macur wrote a biography of champion cyclist Lance Armstrong which became a best selling book. Her work has twice been anthologized in the Best American Sports Writing series. She has also been named one of the top 10 sports columnists in the United States by the Associated Press Sports Editors.

In 2016, Macur was a fellow at the University of Chicago Institute of Politics. She currently lives in Washington, D.C.

== Awards ==
- National Press Club
- Associated Press Sports Editors
- Society of Professional Journalists
- New York Press Club
- The Sidney Award
- Newswomen's Club of New York

== Bibliography ==
- Cycle of Lies: The Fall of Lance Armstrong, New York, 2014.
