= Jeffrey Vanderbeek =

American businessman (born 1958)

Jeff Vanderbeek (born 1958) is the former owner of the New Jersey Devils, a professional ice hockey team in the National Hockey League. Vanderbeek, a New Jersey native and Devils season ticket holder since the late 1980s, bought a minority stake in the Devils when Puck Holdings, an affiliate of YankeeNets, purchased the team in 2000. In 2004, he bought the team outright and resigned his position as an executive vice president of Lehman Brothers, which he joined in 1984. He was ranked the ninth highest paid executive of 2002 by Business Week with pay totaling over $29 million.

== Owner of the New Jersey Devils ==
In August 2013, he sold the franchise and the operating rights at the Prudential Center to an investment group led by Josh Harris and David Blitzer for $320 million.

== Personal life ==
Raised in Somerville, New Jersey, Vanderbeek moved to Bridgewater Township as a child and graduated from Bridgewater-Raritan High School East in 1975.

He resides in Warren Township, New Jersey, having previously resided in South Orange, New Jersey.
