= The Albert J Castronovo Esprit de Corps Award =

American music award

The Al Castronovo Esprit de Corps Award
- Awarded for: An award given to the one band that most exhibits pride, spirit, enthusiasm, friendliness, camaraderie, and unity of purpose for the marching band activity. It is awarded during the Bands of America National Championships
- Location: Lucas Oil Stadium, Indianapolis, Indiana
- Presented by: Bands of America (1978–current)

History
- First award: 1978
- Most recent: November 2025; Kenai Central High School; Kenai, AK
- Website: https://www.musicforall.org/

The Albert J. Castronovo Esprit de Corps Award is a special award presented at the Bands of America Grand National Competition. All bands participating in the Grand Nationals are eligible to receive the award regardless of their scores in the competition. The group that most exhibits pride, spirit, enthusiasm, friendliness, camaraderie, and unity of purpose for the marching band activity is selected to receive the award.

== History ==
The Esprit de Corps Award was first awarded in 1978. It was later renamed the "Al Castronovo Esprit de Corps Award" in 1987 after his death. Since then, one band has received the award at each year's Grand National Championship competition except for 1993 and 2012, when two groups tied and both were presented with the award. The BOA staff, Grand National event staff, and volunteers are asked to nominate a band to receive the award. The BOA executive staff reviews nominees and makes the final selection. Starting in 2016, the family of Al Castronovo has been involved in selecting the winning band and presenting the award.

== Albert J. Castronovo ==
Albert J. Castronovo (1937 - 1986) was a nationally acclaimed bandleader, choreographer, educator and administrator. He was recognized as a pioneer in using amplification and special effects for marching bands. He was also considered an authority in the use of computers for music education, being one of the first to design marching band shows using a computer and plotter. During a teaching career of 25 years, his bands, choirs, orchestras, and jazz bands received 25 consecutive superior ratings at Indiana State Competitions. His marching band at Chesterton High School won seven state championships, four national competitions including the 1981 Marching Bands of America Grand National Championship, and was selected as one of 10 bands to march in President Ronald Reagan’s 1981 Inaugural Parade. He sat on the Bands of America advisory board and was a well-loved teacher by his colleagues and students, alike. He was an inspirational teacher whose ideals embodied the spirit of the Bands of America’s mission to create and provide positive, life-changing experiences through music. The award was named in his honor after his death in 1986. In 2024, Al Castronovo was inducted into the Bands of America Hall of Fame.

== Al Castronovo Esprit de Corps Award winners ==
| Year | School | City | State |
|---|---|---|---|
| 2025 | Kenai Central High School | Kenai | AK |
| 2024 | Broken Arrow High School | Broken Arrow | OK |
| 2023 | William Mason High School | Mason | OH |
| 2022 | DeWitt High School | DeWitt | MI |
| 2021 | Mustang High School | Mustang | OK |
| 2019 | Claudia Taylor Johnson High School | San Antonio | TX |
| 2018 | Blue Springs High School | Blue Springs | MO |
| 2017 | Mililani High School | Mililani | HI |
| 2016 | Vista Murrieta High School | Murrieta | CA |
| 2015 | Colony High School (Alaska) | Palmer | AK |
| 2014 | Marian Catholic High School | Chicago Heights | IL |
| 2013 | Marcus High School | Flower Mound | TX |
| 2012 (Tie) | Bridgewater-Raritan High School | Bridgewater | NJ |
| 2012 (Tie) | Avon High School | Avon | IN |
| 2011 | Father Ryan High School | Nashville | TN |
| 2010 | Broken Arrow High School | Broken Arrow | OK |
| 2009 | American Fork High School | American Fork | UT |
| 2008 | Vista Murrieta High School | Murrieta | CA |
| 2007 | Marian Catholic High School | Chicago Heights | IL |
| 2006 | Plymouth-Canton Educational Park | Canton | MI |
| 2005 | Thousand Oaks High School | Thousand Oaks | CA |
| 2004 | Stephen F. Austin High School | Sugar Land | TX |
| 2003 | Avon High School | Avon | IN |
| 2002 | Fort Mill High School | Fort Mill | SC |
| 2001 | Bellevue West High School | Bellevue | NE |
| 2000 | Ben Davis High School | Indianapolis | IN |
| 1999 | Broken Arrow High School | Broken Arrow | OK |
| 1998 | Tarpon Springs High School | Tarpon Springs | FL |
| 1997 | James F. Byrnes High School | Duncan | SC |
| 1996 | Irmo High School | Columbia | SC |
| 1995 | American Fork High School | American Fork | UT |
| 1994 | Lassiter High School | Marietta | GA |
| 1993 (Tie) | Hazard High School | Hazard | KY |
| 1993 (Tie) | Centerville High School | Centerville | OH |
| 1992 | Owen Valley Community High School | Spencer | IN |
