= Tyler Wade =

American baseball player (born 1994)

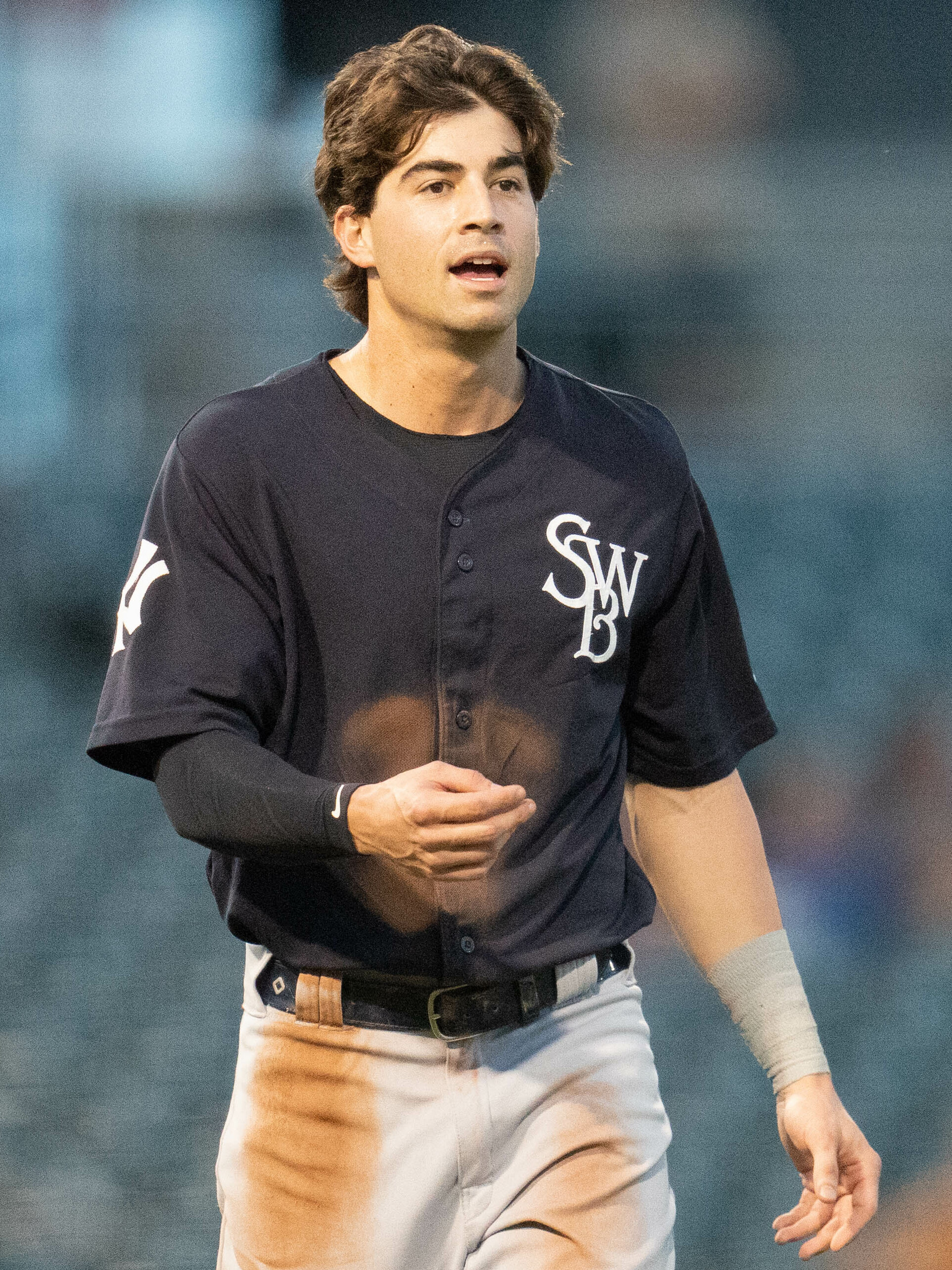
- Wade with the SWB RailRiders in 2022
- Utility player
- Born: November 23, 1994 (age 31); Murrieta, California, U.S.
- Batted: Left Threw: Right

MLB debut
- June 27, 2017, for the New York Yankees

Last MLB appearance
- July 27, 2025, for the San Diego Padres

MLB statistics
- Batting average: .216
- Home runs: 7
- Runs batted in: 60
- Stolen bases: 51
- Stats at Baseball Reference

Teams
- New York Yankees (2017–2021); Los Angeles Angels (2022); Oakland Athletics (2023); San Diego Padres (2024–2025)

Tyler Dean Wade (born November 23, 1994) is an American former professional baseball utility player. He played in Major League Baseball (MLB) for the New York Yankees, Los Angeles Angels, Oakland Athletics, and San Diego Padres.

== Early life ==
Wade was born in Murrieta, California, and attended Murrieta Valley High School.

The New York Yankees selected Wade in the fourth round of the 2013 Major League Baseball draft. He had committed to play college baseball at San Diego State University, but chose to forgo his commitment and sign with the New York Yankees, for a $371,300 signing bonus.

== Professional career ==
=== New York Yankees ===
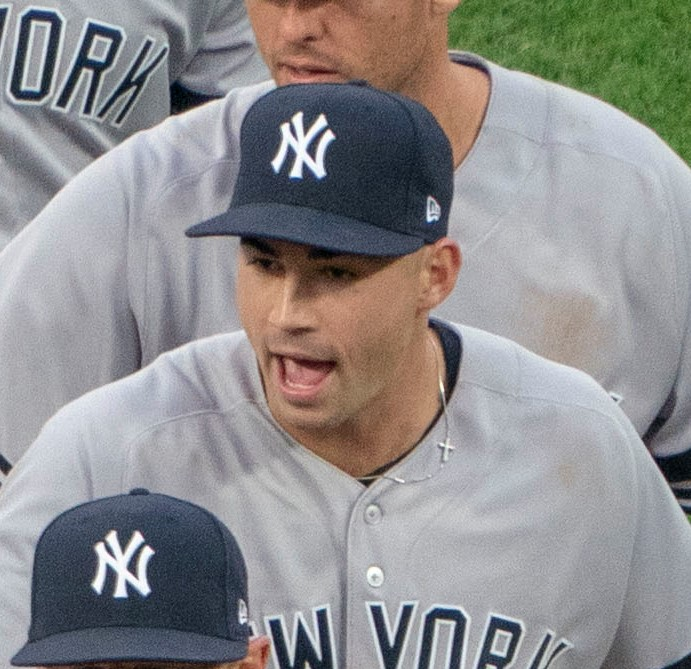
Wade with the New York Yankees in 2019

Wade made his professional debut with the Gulf Coast Yankees of the Rookie-level Gulf Coast League. Near the end of the season, after batting .309/.429/.370 with 12 RBIs, he was promoted to the Staten Island Yankees of the Low–A New York-Penn League where he played in four games. In 2014, Wade played for the Charleston RiverDogs of the Single–A South Atlantic League where he posted a .272 batting average with one home run and 51 RBIs in 129 games. He started 2015 with the Tampa Yankees of the High–A Florida State League and was named a Mid-Season and Post-Season All-Star. He was promoted to the Trenton Thunder of the Double–A Eastern League during the season. In 127 games between both clubs, he batted .262 with three home runs and 31 RBIs. Wade also played in the Arizona Fall League that year.

Wade received a non-roster invitation to spring training by the Yankees in 2016, but spent the season with Trenton. Wade finished 2016 batting .259 with five home runs and 27 RBIs in 133 games, and was again named a Mid-Season and Post-Season All-Star.

Due to an injury to Didi Gregorius, Wade competed to earn a spot on the Yankees' 25-man roster in spring training in 2017. Wade began the 2017 season with the Scranton/Wilkes-Barre RailRiders of the Triple–A International League. The Yankees promoted Wade to the major leagues on June 27. He recorded his first hit, a double, the following day. Wade was sent back down on July 15 but soon returned on July 23. He was again demoted on August 25 before returning on September 4. In 85 games for the RailRiders he batted .310 with seven home runs and 31 RBIs, and was named an International League Post-Season All-Star. In 30 games for the Yankees, he hit just .155/.222/.224.

Wade made the 2018 Opening Day roster after hitting .357/.400/.452 in spring training. He got just three hits in 38 at-bats before getting sent down on April 22 in favor of Gleyber Torres. Wade was recalled on July 5 when Torres went on the disabled list. He was again optioned to Triple-A when Torres returned on July 25. Wade was briefly called up when Aaron Judge broke his wrist on July 26, but was sent down again on August 2. He returned as a September call up the next month.

In 2019, Wade was the final roster cut before the end of spring training. He voiced his unhappiness with the decision to the media. However, Wade was soon called up on April 1 when Miguel Andújar suffered a labrum tear in his shoulder. After hitting .204 over 20 games, he was sent back to Triple-A on May 8. Wade was once again recalled to the majors when CC Sabathia went on the Injured List at the end of July. He was demoted on August 2 but recalled on August 18 when Thairo Estrada went down with a hamstring injury. He remained with the Yankees for the rest of the year, and finished the 2019 season hitting .245/.330/.362 with two home runs and 11 RBIs in 108 plate appearances.

In the coronavirus-shortened 2020 season, Wade was positioned as the team's super utility player, able to play almost every position on the field. He hit .170/.288/.307 with 3 home runs and 10 RBIs in 52 games. In 2021, Wade made the opening Day roster. He was optioned to Triple-A on April 10 but returned on April 27. He remained with the team for the rest of the season and hit .268/.354/.323 with 17 stolen bases in 103 games.

=== Los Angeles Angels ===
On November 19, 2021, the Yankees designated Wade for assignment. The Yankees traded Wade to the Los Angeles Angels for a player to be named later (PTBNL) or cash considerations on November 22. He made the team's opening day roster as one half of a platoon at second base with Matt Duffy. In 67 games with the Angels, Wade batted .218/.272/.272 with 8 RBIs. He was designated for assignment on July 3, 2022. He was unclaimed on waivers and the Angels sent him outright to the Salt Lake Bees of the Triple-A Pacific Coast League.

=== New York Yankees (second stint) ===
On July 14, 2022, the Angels traded Wade to the New York Yankees for a player to be named later or cash considerations. In 42 games for the Triple–A Scranton/Wilkes-Barre RailRiders, he hit .227/.353/.369 with 4 home runs, 16 RBI, and 15 stolen bases. Wade elected free agency on October 6.

=== Oakland Athletics ===
On October 28, 2022, the Oakland Athletics and Wade agreed to a minor league contract. He was a non-roster invitee in spring training before being assigned to the Triple-A Las Vegas Aviators to begin the 2023 season.

On April 14, 2023, Wade had his contract selected to the active roster. He appeared in 10 games for Oakland, going 1-for-13 (.077) with 8 strikeouts. Upon the activation of Ramón Laureano from the injured list on April 29, Wade was designated for assignment. He cleared waivers and was sent outright to Las Vegas on May 1. On June 17, Wade had his contract selected back to the major league roster after Kevin Smith was placed on the injured list. Through 26 total games for Oakland, he had hit .255 with 2 RBI and 4 stolen bases. On July 14, Wade was removed from the 40-man roster and sent outright to Triple–A Las Vegas. On August 1, Wade was re–selected to the major league roster. He did not appear in a game for Oakland before he was designated for assignment two days later. On August 4, he again cleared waivers and was sent outright to Triple–A Las Vegas. On October 5, Wade elected free agency.

=== San Diego Padres ===
On November 3, 2023, Wade signed a minor league contract with the San Diego Padres. On March 19, 2024, the Padres selected Wade's contract and added him to their Opening Day roster. In 90 appearances for San Diego, he batted .217/.285/.239 with eight RBI and eight stolen bases.

Wade was designated for assignment by the Padres on March 27, 2025. He cleared waivers and was sent outright to the Triple-A El Paso Chihuahuas on April 1. On April 11, the Padres selected Wade's contract, adding him to their active roster. In 59 appearances for San Diego, he batted .206/.309/.252 with nine RBI and one stolen base. Wade was designated for assignment by the Padres on August 1. He cleared waivers and was sent outright to El Paso on August 6. On November 6, the Padres declined Wade's club option, making him a free agent.

=== Texas Rangers ===
On December 8, 2025, Wade signed a minor league contract with the Texas Rangers. He made 16 appearances for the Triple-A Round Rock Express, batting .226/.315/.242 with six RBI and four stolen bases. Wade was released by the Rangers organization on April 19, 2026.

On September 28, 2026, Wade announced his retirement from professional baseball via his Instagram.

== Personal life ==
Wade first visited New York City when he played a tournament at the Old Yankee Stadium when he was 11 years old. Ever since, he has been a New York Yankees fan. He briefly dated TikTok star Alix Earle in 2022.
