= Ryan Navarro =

American football player (born 1994)

No. 69
- Position: Long snapper

Personal information
- Born: July 5, 1994 (age 32); Riverside, California, U.S.
- Listed height: 6 ft 2 in (1.88 m)
- Listed weight: 235 lb (107 kg)

Career information
- High school: Vista Murrieta (Murrieta, California)
- College: Riverside City (2013–2014); Oregon State (2015–2016)
- NFL draft: 2017: undrafted

Career history
- Oakland Raiders (2017)*; Washington Redskins (2018)*; Memphis Express (2019); Los Angeles Wildcats (2020); Philadelphia Stars (2022–2023)
- * Offseason or practice squad member only

Ryan Navarro (born July 5, 1994) is an American former football long snapper. He also played for the Memphis Express of the Alliance of American Football (AAF) and Los Angeles Wildcats of the XFL. He played college football at Riverside City College before transferring to Oregon State.

== Early life and college ==
Ryan Navarro was born on July 5, 1994, in Riverside, California. Growing up in Murrieta, California, he helped Vista Murrieta High School to win the CIF championship in 2011. He originally played college football at Riverside City College. He played long snapper for Riverside City in 2013 and 2014. Navarro arrived at Oregon State as a junior in 2015. He would play all games in the 2015 and 2016 seasons.

== Professional career ==
=== Oakland Raiders ===
In 2017, Navarro signed with the Oakland Raiders after going undrafted in the 2017 NFL draft. He would not make the final roster.

=== Washington Redskins ===
In 2018, Navarro was signed by the Washington Redskins for mini camps. Once again, he did not make the final roster.

=== Memphis Express ===
In 2018, Navarro signed with the Memphis Express of the Alliance of American Football for the 2019 AAF season. The league ceased operations in April 2019.

=== Los Angeles Wildcats ===
In October 2019, Navarro was selected by the Los Angeles Wildcats in the 2020 XFL draft's open phase. He had his contract terminated when the league suspended operations on April 10, 2020.

=== Philadelphia Stars ===
Navarro was selected in the 35th round of the 2022 USFL draft by the Philadelphia Stars. He re-signed with the Stars on September 30, 2023. The Stars folded when the XFL and USFL merged to create the United Football League (UFL).
