= Murrieta Mesa High School =

Location
- 24801 Monroe Avenue; Murrieta, California 92562; United States; 33.564329°N 117.200807°W

Information
- Type: Public high school
- Motto: Pursue Your Passion, Leave A Legacy
- Established: 2009
- School district: Murrieta Valley Unified School District
- NCES School ID: 060002912289
- Principal: Scott Richards Jr.
- Teaching staff: 93.44 (FTE)
- Grades: 9–12
- Enrollment: 2,228 (2023–2024)
- Student to teacher ratio: 23.84
- Colors: Green, gold, and gray
- Mascot: Ram
- Website: rams.murrieta.k12.ca.us

Murrieta Mesa High School (MMHS) is a comprehensive, four-year high school located in Murrieta, California, United States. It is operated by the Murrieta Valley Unified School District. The school opened in 2009 to keep up with population growth in Murrieta. The first graduating class was the class of 2012. The school derives its name from the mesa it sits on, identified in an 1884 surveyor's map of the valley.

== Feeder schools ==
- Elementary: E. Hale Curran, Avaxat, Antelope Hills, Rail Ranch, Synclax
- Middle: Shivela Middle School

== Athletics ==
- The varsity football team won the CIF-SS Division 6 championship against Glendora High School 17–7 in 2024.
