= Abraham Toro =

Canadian baseball player (born 1996)

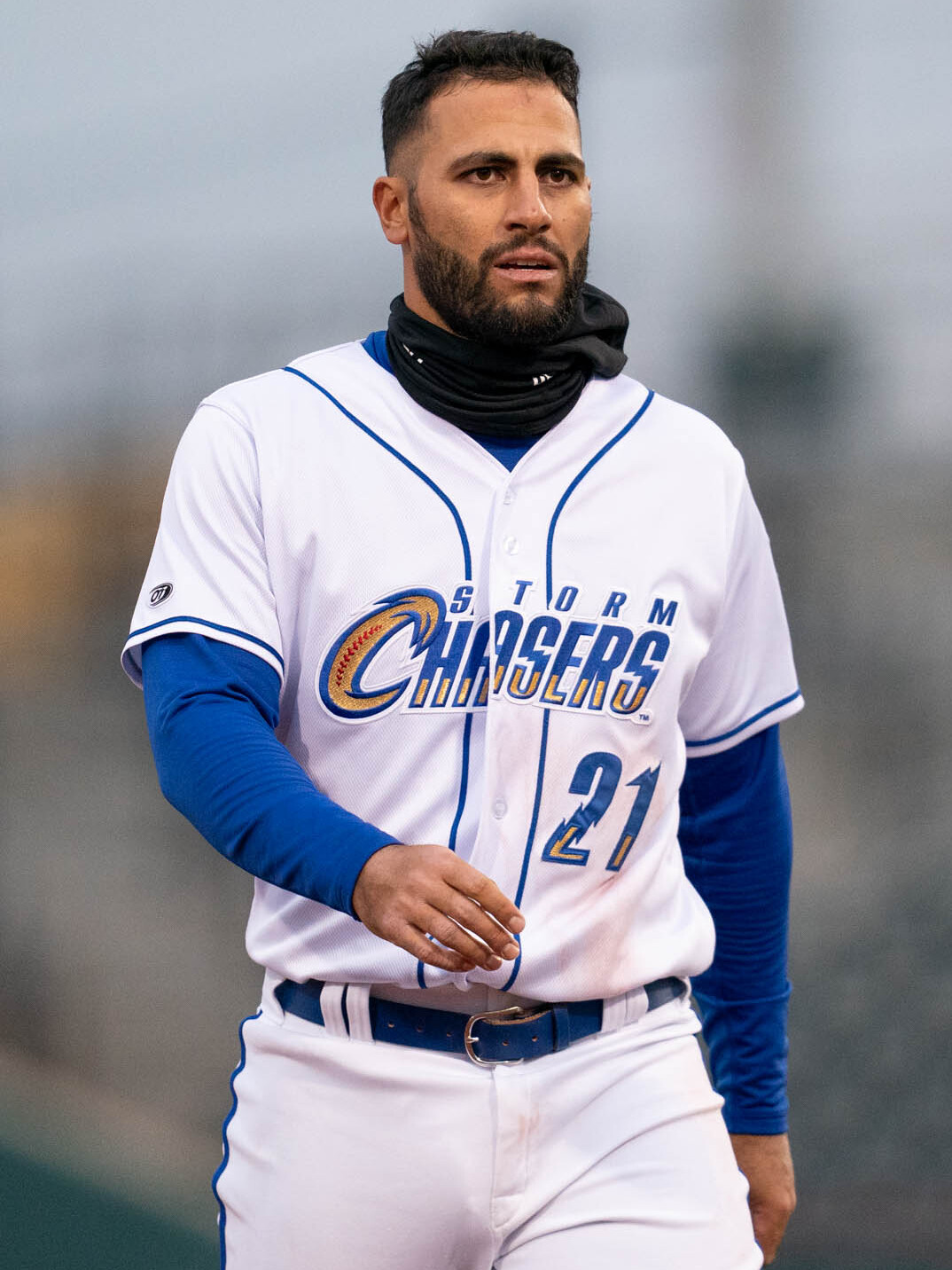
- Toro with the Omaha Storm Chasers in 2026

Free agent
- Infielder
- Born: December 20, 1996 (age 29); Longueuil, Quebec, Canada
- Bats: Switch Throws: Right

MLB debut
- August 22, 2019, for the Houston Astros

MLB statistics (through 2025 season)
- Batting average: .223
- Home runs: 41
- Runs batted in: 161
- Stats at Baseball Reference

Teams
- Houston Astros (2019–2021); Seattle Mariners (2021–2022); Milwaukee Brewers (2023); Oakland Athletics (2024); Boston Red Sox (2025)

Abraham Josue Toro (born December 20, 1996) is a Canadian professional baseball infielder who is a free agent. He has previously played in Major League Baseball (MLB) for the Houston Astros, Seattle Mariners, Milwaukee Brewers, Oakland Athletics, and Boston Red Sox.

He was selected by the Astros in the fifth round of the 2016 Major League Baseball draft and made his MLB debut for them in 2019. He was traded to the Mariners during the 2021 season, to the Brewers after the 2022 season, and to the Athletics after the 2023 season.

== Amateur career ==
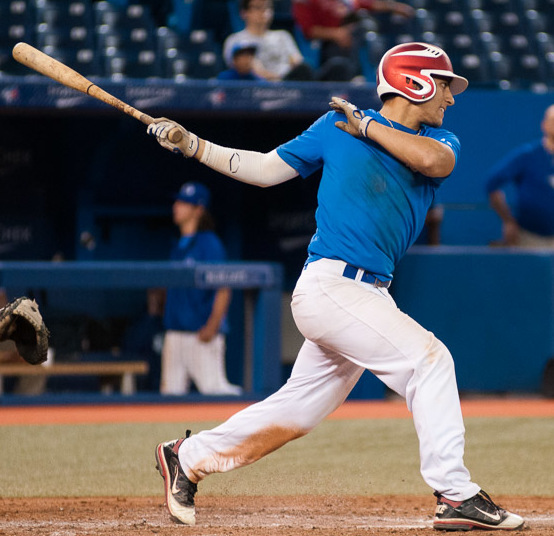
Toro in 2014

Toro attended Polyvalente Édouard-Montpetit High School and Vanier College in Montreal. He then attended Seminole State College in Seminole, Oklahoma to play college baseball, following the same path as fellow French-Canadian baseball player Éric Gagné. In 2016, his only season at Seminole, he hit .439 with 20 home runs and 86 RBIs over 55 games.

== Professional career ==
=== Houston Astros ===
Toro was drafted by the Houston Astros in the fifth round of the 2016 Major League Baseball draft. He signed with the Astros with a $250,000 signing bonus and made his professional debut with the Greeneville Astros, batting .254 with 19 RBIs in 44 games. He began 2017 with the Tri-City ValleyCats before being promoted to the Quad Cities River Bandits in late July. In 69 games between the two clubs, he hit .246 with 15 home runs and 33 RBIs. In 2018, he began the year with the Buies Creek Astros, with whom he was named a Carolina League All-Star, and was promoted to the Corpus Christi Hooks in July. For the season, Toro slashed .247/.345/.435 with 16 home runs and 78 RBIs in 133 games. After the season, he played in the Arizona Fall League. He returned to Corpus Christi to begin 2019, earning Texas League All-Star honors. After slashing .306/.393/.513 with 16 home runs and 70 RBIs over 98 games, Toro was promoted to the Round Rock Express and hit .424/.506/.606 with one home run and 10 RBIs in 16 games for them.

On August 22, 2019, the Astros selected Toro's contract and promoted him to the major leagues. He made his major league debut that night against the Detroit Tigers, playing third base and going 0-for-4. He had his first MLB hit the next day, a single off José Suárez of the Los Angeles Angels. On September 1, playing in his home country of Canada, Toro hit a two-out, two-run home run in the top of the ninth inning to break a scoreless tie. In the bottom of the inning, he fielded the final out of the game to complete Justin Verlander’s third career no-hitter. For Houston in 2019, Toro hit .218/.303/.385 with two home runs and nine RBIs over 25 games.

In the shortened 2020 season with the Astros, Toro batted .149/.237/.276 with 13 runs, three home runs, and nine RBIs over 87 at bats, and was hit by a pitch seven times, tied for fourth in the American League. In 35 games for the Astros in 2021, Toro slashed .211/.287/.385 with six home runs and 20 RBIs. He hit a home run in each of his last two games with Houston.

=== Seattle Mariners ===
On July 27, 2021, the Astros traded Toro and relief pitcher Joe Smith to the Seattle Mariners for relievers Rafael Montero and Kendall Graveman. The two teams were in the midst of a series against each other, and Toro was informed of the news as he was taking batting practice for Houston. After learning he had been traded, he went to the Seattle dugout, put on his new uniform, and resumed warming up. In the ninth inning of that night's game, Toro was put in as a pinch hitter and hit a two-run home run against Ryan Pressly, making him the first player in MLB history to homer for a team and against the same team in consecutive games. The next day, Toro homered for the fourth straight game.

On August 31, with the Mariners again facing the Astros, Toro came to bat against Graveman in the eighth inning of a scoreless game with the bases loaded, and, on the eighth pitch of the at-bat, hit a 413-foot home run for his first career grand slam. The homer accounted for all the runs scored in a Mariners win and put the team 3.5 games out of the second wild card playoff seed with 29 games remaining. Toro finished the 2021 season with a batting average of .239, 11 home runs, and 46 RBIs (all career highs). With the Mariners, he posted a slash line of .252/.328/.367, hit five home runs, scored 28 runs, and drove in 26.

Toro began the 2022 season with the Mariners as a part-time utility player. On May 21, he collided with right fielder Adam Frazier and suffered a left shoulder sprain, sending Toro to the injured list. He was activated on June 1. During the summer, Toro had late, clutch hits against the Baltimore Orioles, Oakland Athletics, and Houston Astros, before he was sent to the minor leagues on August 6 to open up a roster spot for Mitch Haniger to return from injury. Toro was recalled on August 30, and one day later hit a 403-foot go-ahead home run against the Detroit Tigers in a win which put the Mariners a season-high 14 games over .500. Toro ended the season with a .185 batting average and 10 home runs in a career-high 109 games.

=== Milwaukee Brewers ===
On December 2, 2022, the Mariners traded Toro and Jesse Winker to the Milwaukee Brewers in exchange for Kolten Wong. Toro agreed to a one-year, $1.25 million contract with the Brewers for the 2023 season, avoiding salary arbitration. The Brewers optioned Toro to the Triple–A Nashville Sounds to begin the 2023 season. He was called up to Milwaukee on May 30 to replace Winker, who was placed on the injured list. His first hit for the Brewers was a two-run homer in a 4–2 victory against the Toronto Blue Jays, his third home run in seven games played in his home country of Canada. Toro got four hits in eight at-bats and drove in five runs while with the Brewers but was sent back to Triple–A on June 14. He was recalled on July 26, following another Winker injury. He started three games for the Brewers, going 4 for 10 with one three-run home run before being sent back to Nashville on August 3. He was called back up to the Brewers from August 11 to 19, drawing a walk in his only plate appearance during that stretch. In a brief 21 plate appearances over 9 games with the Brewers, Toro hit .444/.524/.778, one of the most productive stretches of his career. He also played 96 games in Nashville in 2023, leading the Sounds in hits, doubles, and walks.

=== Oakland Athletics ===
On November 15, 2023, the Brewers traded Toro to the Oakland Athletics in exchange for Chad Patrick. On November 17, the Athletics signed Toro to a one-year, $1.275 million contract. He played in 94 games for Oakland in 2024, slashing .240/.293/.350 with six home runs, 26 RBI, and four stolen bases. His offense swooned in the second half of the season, with a .433 OPS in his final 21 games. Toro was designated for assignment by the Athletics on August 27. He cleared waivers and was sent outright to the Triple–A Las Vegas Aviators the next day. Toro elected free agency on October 15.

=== Boston Red Sox ===
On January 28, 2025, Toro signed a minor league contract with the Boston Red Sox. He was assigned to the Triple-A Worcester Red Sox to begin the year. On May 3, after starting first baseman Triston Casas sustained a knee injury, Toro's contract was selected and he was added to Boston's active roster.

Toro found early success with the Red Sox, and was able to provide stability and consistency to Boston's first base position following the injury of Casas. Through May and June, Toro hit .286 with five home runs and 16 RBI in 42 games, splitting time at both first and third after an injury to Red Sox third baseman Alex Bregman. However, Toro began to cool off afterwards, hitting .185 with two home runs and 11 RBI in 35 games after June. Toro was designated for assignment by the Red Sox on August 21. In 76 games with the Red Sox, Toro slashed .244/.294/.378 with seven home runs and 27 RBI. He cleared waivers and was sent outright to Triple-A Worcester on August 23. On October 10, Toro elected free agency.

=== Kansas City Royals ===
On December 19, 2025, Toro signed a minor league contract with the Kansas City Royals. In 123 games with Triple-A Omaha Storm Chasers he batted .270/.351/.478 with 19 home runs, 70 RBIs and 2 stolen bases. He elected free agency on November 2.

== International career ==
Toro played for Canada in the 2023 World Baseball Classic. He played third base in all four of Canada's games, batting 5 for 15 with three RBI, two walks, and three strikeouts. His most productive game was Canada's 18–8 mercy rule win over Great Britain, when he went 2 for 4 with a double and three RBI.

== Personal life ==
Born in Canada, Toro's parents, Douglas and Natalie, are from Venezuela. He speaks fluent English, Spanish, and French.

Toro's older brother Douglas Toro played baseball, including for the Québec Capitales of the Can-Am League. As a child, Abraham was the bat boy for Douglas' junior team, the Ducs de Longueuil. Both brothers also attended the Académie de Baseball du Canada, which is where Abraham became a switch hitter.

As a child, Toro and his father enjoyed watching Venezuelan shortstop Omar Vizquel.
