= Murrieta, California =

City in California, United States

- City
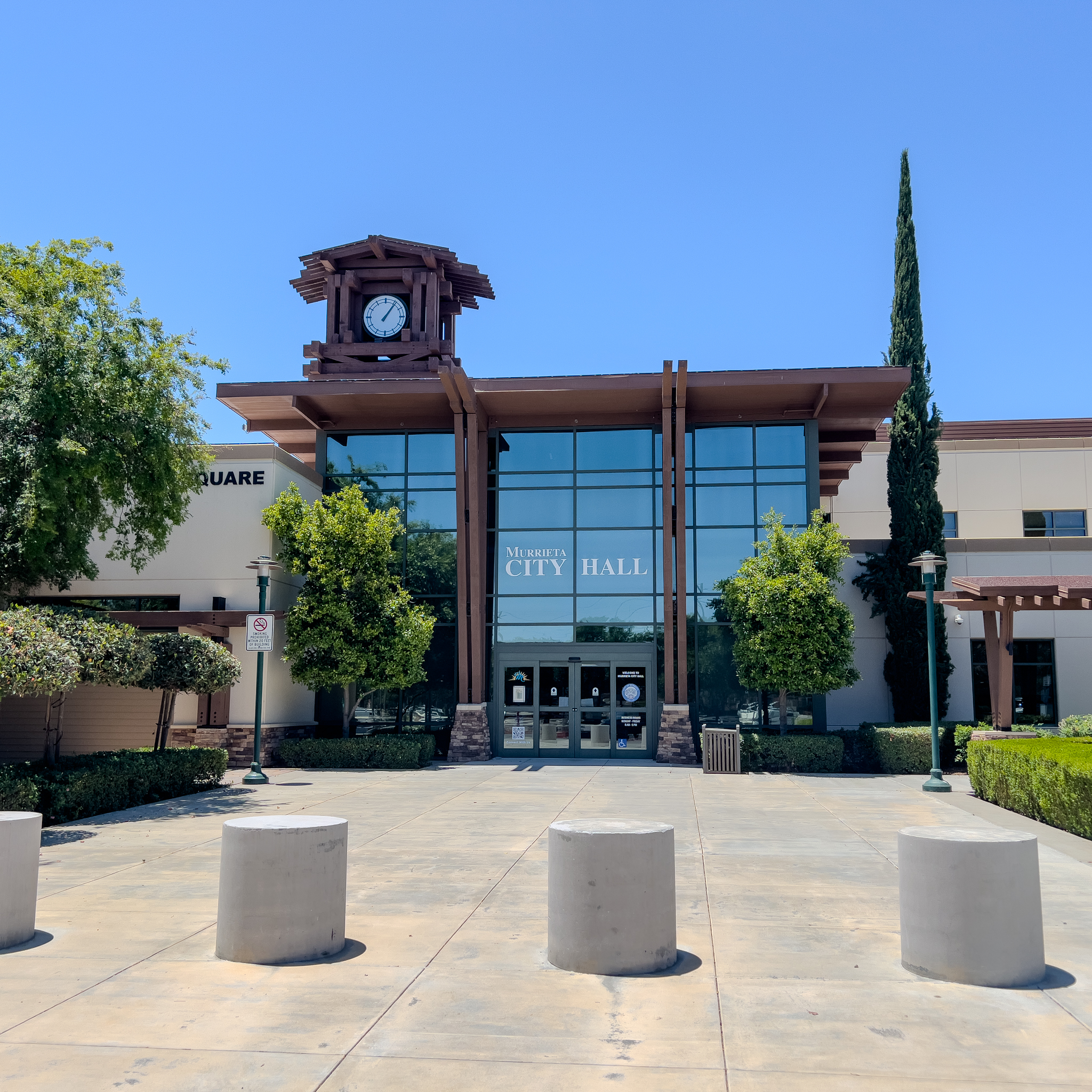
- Murrieta City Hall

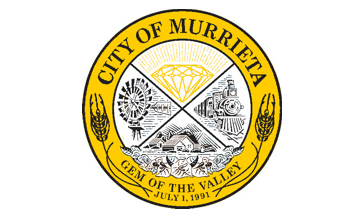
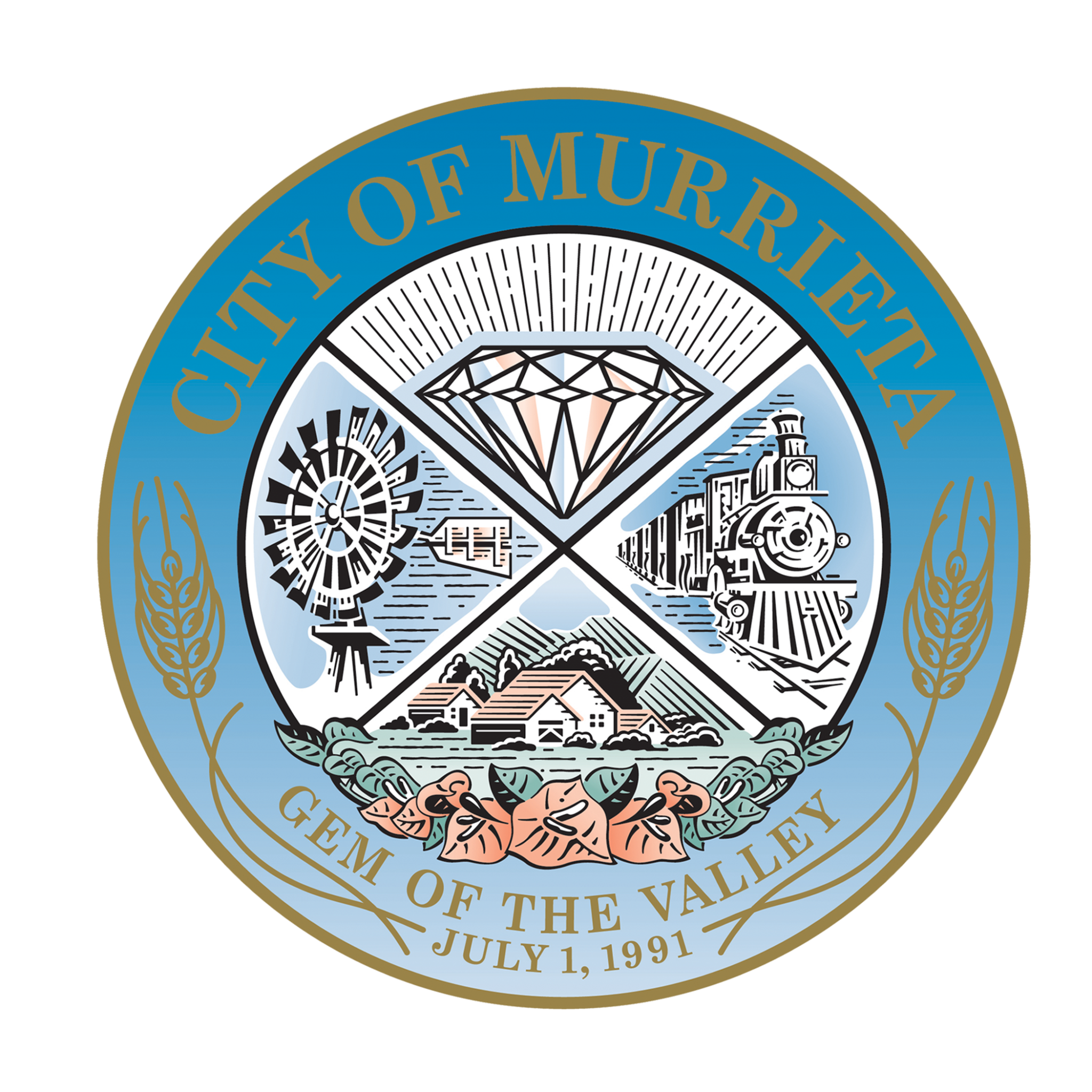
- Flag Seal
- Nickname: Gem of the Valley
- Interactive map of Murrieta, California
- Location in the contiguous United States
- Coordinates: 33°34′10″N 117°12′09″W
- Country: United States
- State: California
- County: Riverside
- Incorporated: July 1, 1991
- Named for: Juan Murrieta

Government
  - Type: Council–manager
  - Mayor: Jon Levell
  - Mayor Pro Tem: Ron Holliday
  - City council: Cindy Warren; Lisa DeForest; Lori Stone
  - City manager: Justin Clifton

Area
  - Total: 33.65 sq mi (87.15 km^{2})
  - Land: 33.61 sq mi (87.05 km^{2})
  - Water: 0.035 sq mi (0.09 km^{2}) 0.11%
- Elevation: 1,096 ft (334 m)

Population (2020)
  - Total: 110,949
  - Estimate (2025): 114,124 ▲
  - Rank: 4th in Riverside County; 59th in California; 274th in the United States
  - Density: 3,301/sq mi (1,274.5/km^{2})
- Time zone: UTC−8 (Pacific)
  - Summer (DST): UTC−7 (PDT)
- ZIP Codes: 92562–92564
- Area code: 951
- FIPS code: 06-50076
- GNIS feature IDs: 1667919, 2411199
- Website: www.murrietaca.gov

Murrieta /mjʊəriˈɛtə/ is a city in the Inland Empire region of southwestern Riverside County, California, United States. The population of Murrieta was 110,949 as of the 2020 census. Murrieta experienced a 133.7% population increase between 2000 and 2010, making it one of the fastest-growing cities in the state during that period. Largely residential, Murrieta is typically characterized as a bedroom community. Murrieta is bordered by the city of Temecula to the south, the cities of Menifee and Wildomar to the north, and the unincorporated community of French Valley to the east. Murrieta is at the center of the Los Angeles-San Diego mega-region. Murrieta is named for Juan Murrieta, a Californio ranchero who founded the town.

== History ==
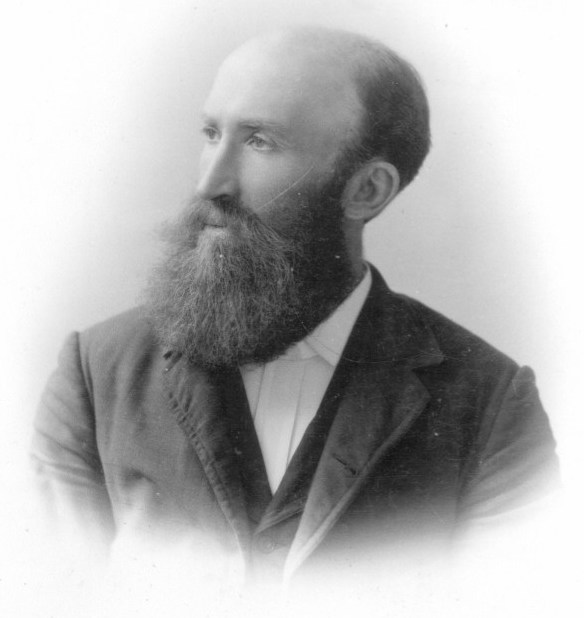
Murrieta is named after its founder Juan Murrieta, a Californio ranchero.

The Luiseño people founded the village of Avaa7ax or 'Avaa'ax where Murrieta stands today.

For most of its history, Murrieta was not heavily populated. On June 9, 1873, Domingo Pujol, Francisco Sanjurjo, and Juan and Ezequiel Murrieta purchased the Rancho Pauba and Rancho Temecula Mexican land grants, comprising 52,000 acres (210 km^{2}) in the area. Ezequiel returned to Spain and turned the land over to his younger brother, Juan Murrieta (1844–1936), who brought 7,000 sheep to the valley in 1873, using the meadows to feed his sheep. The partnership dissolved in 1876 and Ezequiel and Juan Murrieta retained 15,000 acres of the northern half of the Temecula Rancho. Ezequiel and Juan Murrieta granted a right-of-way, one hundred feet wide to the California Southern Railroad through the Temecula Rancho on April 28, 1882, so that the railroad could be constructed through the valley.

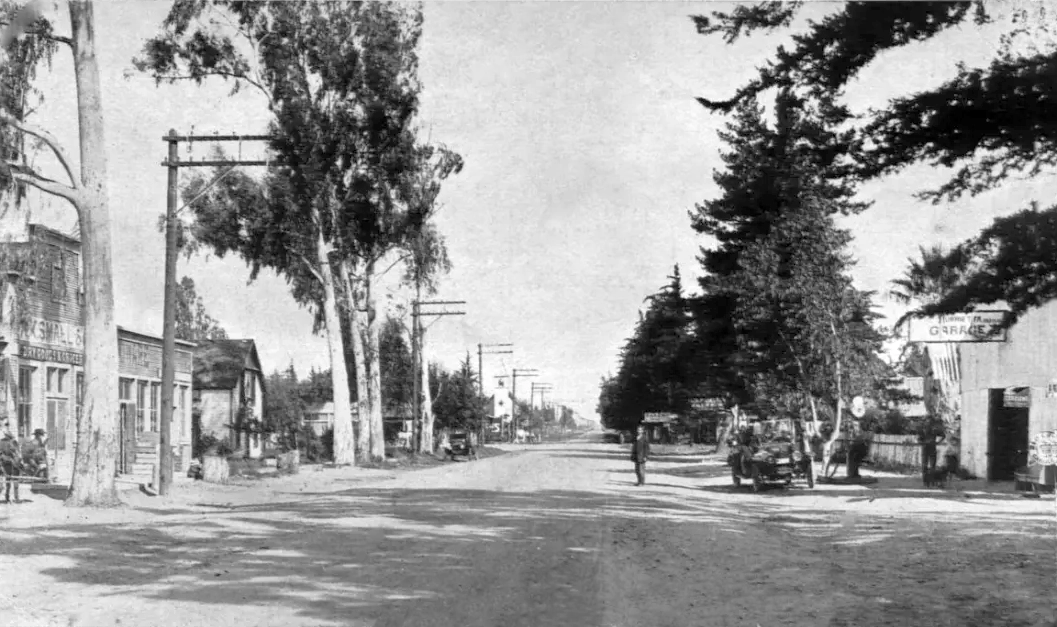
Murrieta, circa 1915

In 1884, the Temecula Land and Water Company purchased about 14,500 acres from Juan Murrieta and mapped a townsite along the California Southern Railroad. Others discovered the valley after the construction of a depot in 1887 that connected Murrieta to the Southern California Railroad's transcontinental route. By 1890, some 800 people lived in Murrieta. Today much of the site (about 50 acres) is home to a Bible college and conference center, owned by Calvary Chapel Costa Mesa, which has invested millions of dollars into restoring and rebuilding the old resort rooms. When the trains stopped in 1935, tourists—the lifeblood of the town—were much harder to come by. The boom that Murrieta had experienced due to the train and the hot springs gradually died, leaving Murrieta as a small country town.

Although US Route 395 had passed through Murrieta, it was not until Interstate 15 was built in the early 1980s that another boom began to take hold. By the late 1980s, suburban neighborhoods were being constructed, and people began moving to the Murrieta area from cities and towns in San Diego and Orange counties, as well as other parts of Riverside County.

In 1990, residents began a campaign for city status which resulted in the incorporation of the City of Murrieta on July 1, 1991. By then the population was 24,000, a major increase from 2,200 in 1980. Between 1991 and 2007, the city's population further increased to an estimated 97,257 residents, and at the 2010 United States Census the city's population was 103,466, making it the largest city in southwestern Riverside County at that time.

In July 2014, Murrieta garnered national attention following days of citizen protests of detained immigrants. Murrieta residents successfully blocked busloads of illegal immigrant detainees. They were en route to a temporary relocation and detention facility, which the federal government had planned to establish in the town.

== Geography ==
According to the United States Census Bureau, the city has a total area of 33.6 sq mi (87.1 km^{2}), of which 99.89% of it is land and 0.11% is covered by water. Murrieta Creek runs southeasterly through the Murrieta Valley. Warm Springs Creek is a tributary of Murrieta Creek that also passes through the city.

=== Climate ===
Climate data for Murrieta, California
Month	Jan	Feb	Mar	Apr	May	Jun	Jul	Aug	Sep	Oct	Nov	Dec	Year
Mean daily maximum °F (°C)	67 (19)	66 (19)	71 (22)	73 (23)	78 (26)	83 (28)	91 (33)	91 (33)	89 (32)	79 (26)	74 (23)	66 (19)	77.4 (25.2)
Mean daily minimum °F (°C)	41 (5)	41 (5)	45 (7)	48 (9)	52 (11)	55 (13)	62 (17)	61 (16)	57 (14)	52 (11)	46 (8)	40 (4)	50 (10)
Average precipitation inches (mm)	3.22 (82)	4.16 (106)	.94 (24)	.73 (19)	.24 (6.1)	.01 (0.25)	.07 (1.8)	.01 (0.25)	.14 (3.6)	1.32 (34)	1.18 (30)	3.54 (90)	15.56 (395)
Source: weathercurrents.com

Murrieta has a Mediterranean climate or dry-summer subtropical (Köppen climate classification Csa). Murrieta has an average of 263 sunshine days and 35 days with measurable precipitation annually.

== Demographics ==
Historical population
Census	Pop.	Note	%±
1990	1,628		—
2000	44,282		2,620.0%
2010	103,466		133.7%
2020	110,949		7.2%
2025 (est.)	114,124	▲	2.9%
U.S. Decennial Census

=== 2020 ===
Murrieta city, California – Racial and ethnic composition Note: the US Census treats Hispanic/Latino as an ethnic category. This table excludes Latinos from the racial categories and assigns them to a separate category. Hispanics/Latinos may be of any race.
Race / Ethnicity (NH = Non-Hispanic)	Pop 1990	Pop 2000	Pop 2010	Pop 2020	% 1990	% 2000	% 2010	% 2020
White alone (NH)	1,304	31,811	57,590	51,437	80.10%	71.84%	55.66%	46.36%
Black or African American alone (NH)	10	1,401	5,162	6,244	0.61%	3.16%	4.99%	5.63%
Native American or Alaska Native alone (NH)	27	190	389	487	1.66%	0.43%	0.38%	0.44%
Asian alone (NH)	6	1,718	9,304	11,158	0.37%	3.88%	8.99%	10.06%
Pacific Islander alone (NH)	6	92	332	440	0.37%	0.21%	0.32%	0.40%
Other Race alone (NH)	1	67	156	625	0.06%	0.15%	0.15%	0.56%
Mixed race or Multiracial (NH)	x	1,264	3,741	6,633	x	2.85%	3.62%	5.98%
Hispanic or Latino (any race)	280	7,739	26,792	33,925	17.20%	17.48%	25.89%	30.58%
Total	1,628	44,282	103,466	110,949	100.00%	100.00%	100.00%	100.00%

=== 2010 ===
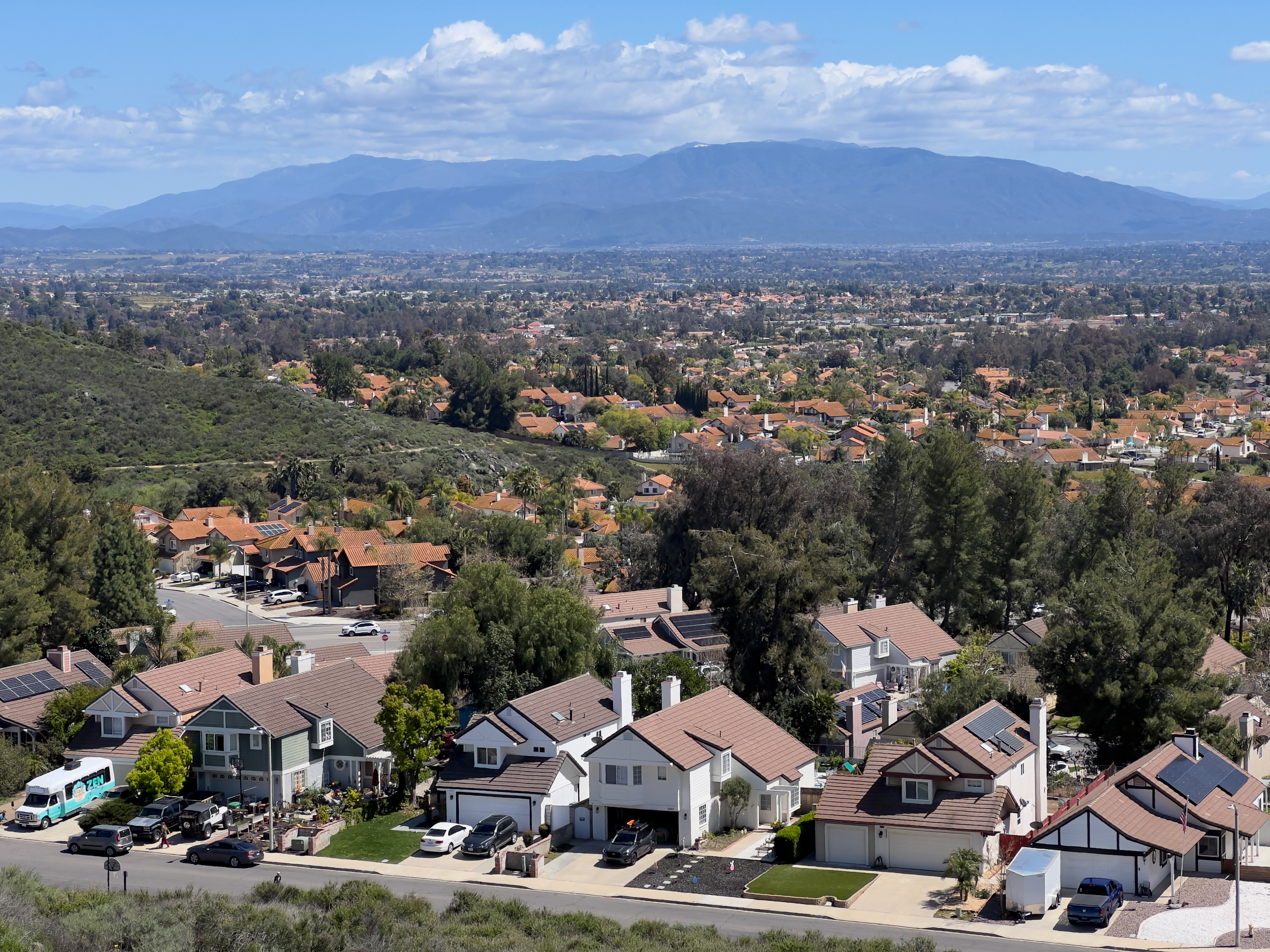
Palomar Mountain from Falcon's View Park, Murrieta

The 2010 United States census reported that Murrieta had a population of 103,466. The population density was 3,078.1 inhabitants per square mile (1,188.5/km^{2}). The racial makeup of Murrieta was 72,137 (69.7%) White (55.7% non-Hispanic White), 5,601 (5.4%) African American, 741 (0.7%) Native American, 9,556 (9.2%) Asian, 391 (0.4%) Pacific Islander, 8,695 (8.4%) from other races, and 6,345 (6.1%) from two or more races. Hispanics or Latinos of any race were 26,792 persons (25.9%). The census reported 103,037 people (99.6% of the population) lived in households, 291 people (0.3%) lived in noninstitutionalized group quarters, and 138 people (0.1%) were institutionalized.

Of the 32,749 households, 48.4% had children under the age of 18 living in them, 62.8% were opposite-sex married couples living together, 3,814 (11.6%) had a female householder with no husband present, and 1,642 (5.0%) had a male householder with no wife present, with 1,626 (5.0%) unmarried opposite-sex partnerships and 192 (0.6%) same-sex married couples or partnerships. About 5,208 households (15.9%) were made up of individuals, and 2,248 (6.9%) had someone living alone who was 65 years of age or older. The average household size was 3.15. There were 26,033 families (79.5% of all households); the average family size was 3.51.

The population was distributed as 31,471 people (30.4%) under the age of 18, 9,891 people (9.6%) aged 18 to 24, 28,144 people (27.2%) aged 25 to 44, 23,555 people (22.8%) aged 45 to 64, and 10,405 people (10.1%) who were 65 years of age or older. The median age was 33.4 years. For every 100 females, there were 95.2 males. For every 100 females age 18 and over, there were 91.2 males.

The 35,294 housing units averaged 1,050.0 per square mile (405.4/km^{2}), of which 23,110 (70.6%) were owner-occupied and 9,639 (29.4%) were occupied by renters. The homeowner vacancy rate was 3.1%; the rental vacancy rate was 7.8%; 73,518 people (71.1% of the population) lived in owner-occupied housing units and 29,519 people (28.5%) lived in rental housing units.

=== 2000 ===
As of the census of 2000, 44,282 people, 14,320 households, and 11,699 families resided in the city. The population density was 1,560.0 inhabitants per square mile (602.3/km^{2}). The 14,921 housing units averaged 525.6 per square mile (202.9/km^{2}). The racial makeup of the city was 81.6% White, 3.4% African American, 0.7% Native American, 4.0% Asian, 6.0% from other races, and 4.3% from two or more races. Hispanics or Latinos of any race were 17.5% of the population.

Of the 14,320 households, 47.5% had children under the age of 18 living with them, 70.2% were married couples living together, 8.1% had a female householder with no husband present, and 18.3% were not families. About 14.5% of all households were made up of individuals, and 6.7% had someone living alone who was 65 years of age or older. The average household size was 3.1 and the average family size was 3.4; 33.7% of the population of the city was under the age of 18, 6.4% were from 18 to 24, 30.8% were from 25 to 44, 17.6% were from 45 to 64, and 11.4% were 65 years of age or older. The median age was 34 years. For every 100 females, there were 96.1 males. For every 100 females age 18 and over, there were 92.7 males.

According to a 2007 estimate, the median income for a household in the city was $78,883, and the median income for a family was $90,930. Men had a median income of $49,107 versus $32,468 for women. The per capita income for the city was $23,290. About 3.0% of families and 4.3% of the population were below the poverty line, including 4.3% of those under age 18 and 5.4% of those age 65 or over.

=== Crime ===
Murrieta was the safest city in Riverside County in 2012, and in 2009, Murrieta was listed as the second-safest city (over 100,000 in population) in the United States, behind Irvine, California.

== Economy ==
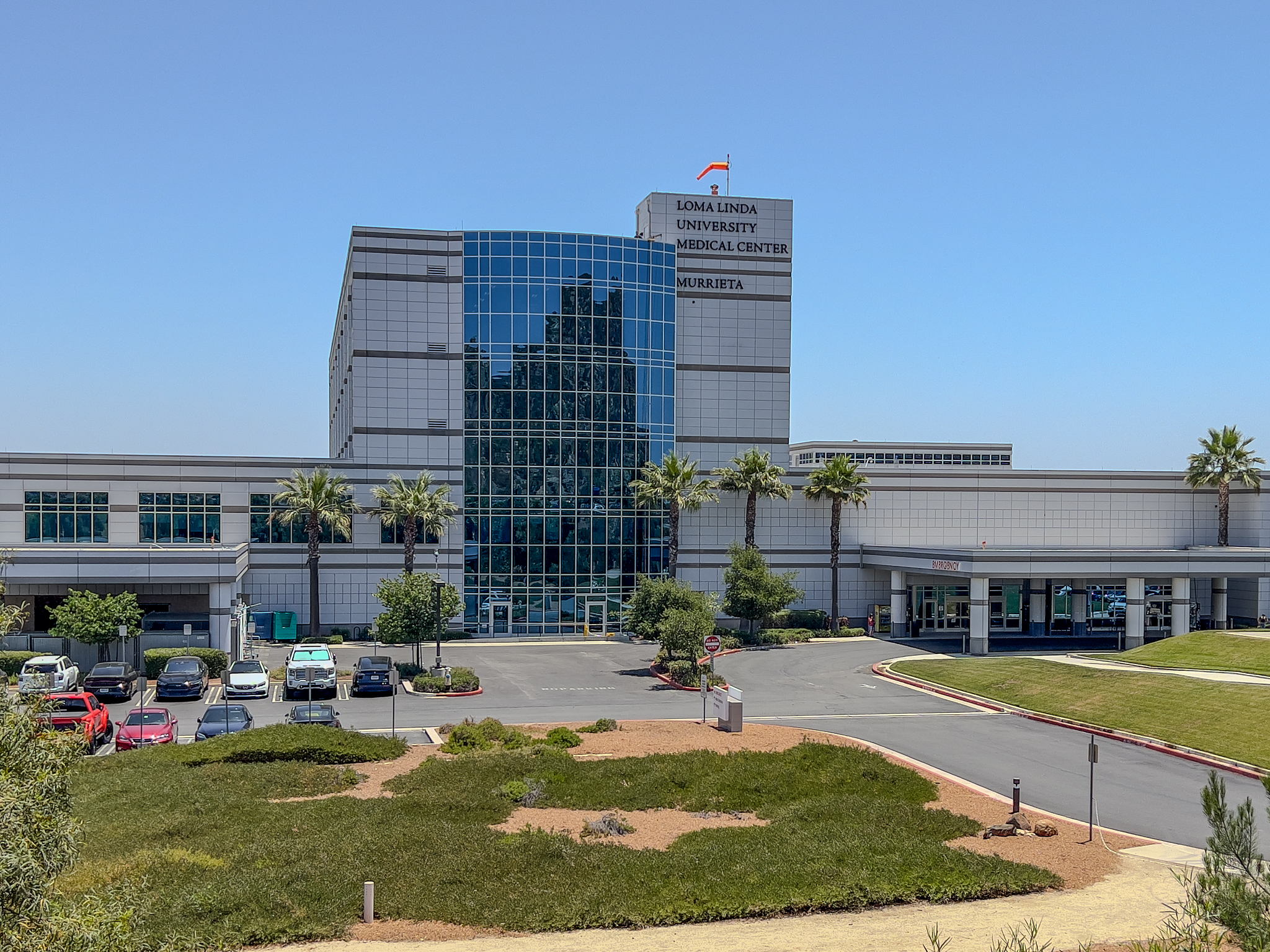
Loma Linda University Medical Center - Murrieta

=== Top employers ===
According to the city's 2025 Comprehensive Annual Financial Report, the top employers in the city are:

#	Employer	# of Employees
1	Rancho Springs Medical Center	2,399
1	Murrieta Valley Unified School District	2,138
3	Loma Linda University Medical Center	1,514
4	County of Riverside	941
5	City of Murrieta	476
6	Costco Wholesale	425
7	Target	420
8	Oak Grove Center	354
9	The Springs Health & Rehabilitation Center	310
10	Walmart	247

== Arts and culture ==
The Town Square is the location of the Murrieta Police Department, Murrieta Public Library, City Hall, a senior center, and $2 million veterans memorial.

== Parks and recreation ==
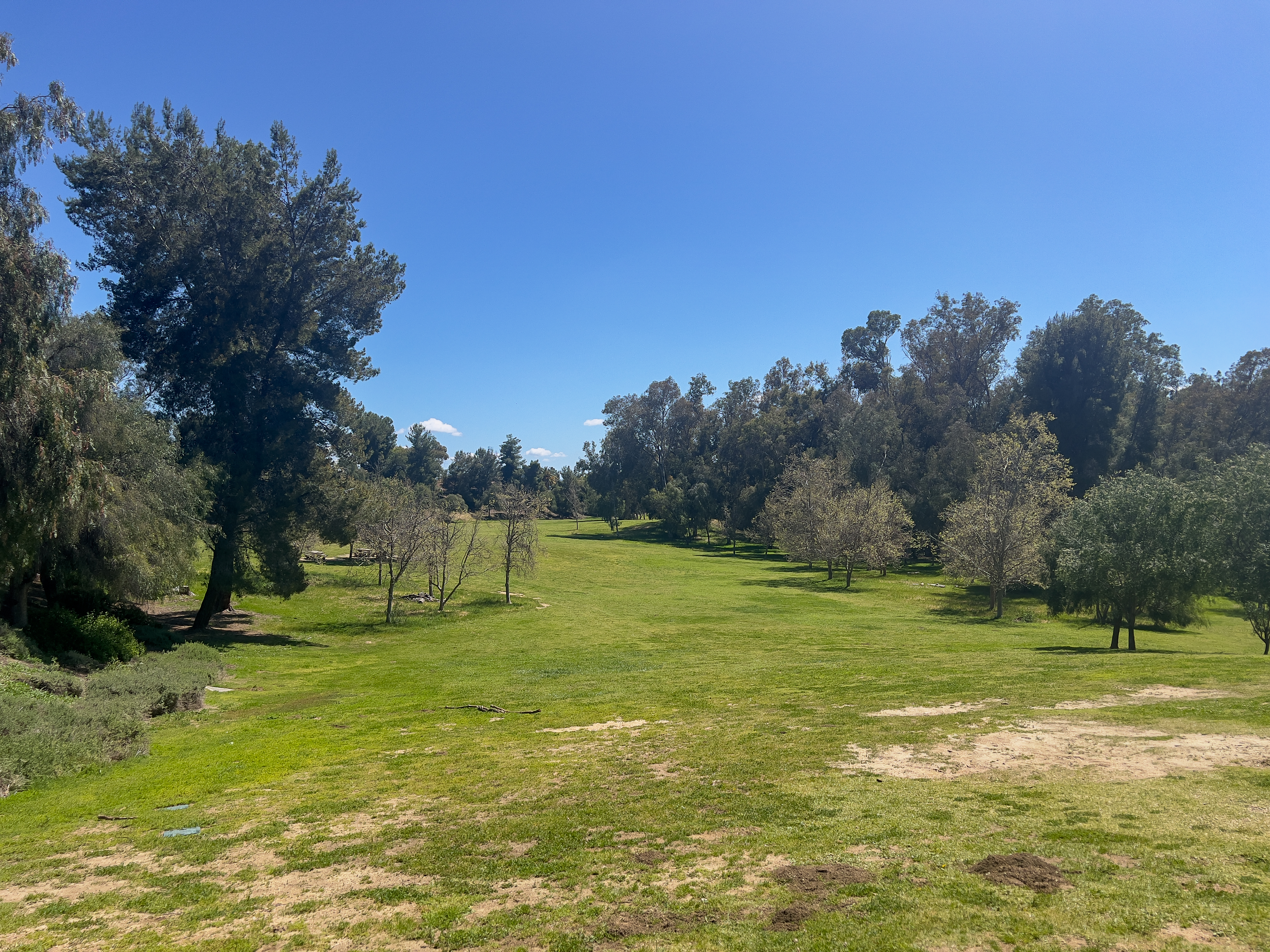
Glen Arbor Park

There are 52 parks in the city of Murrieta, including one community pool, one skate park, three sports parks, two dog parks, two disc golf courses, an equestrian park, and various natural areas.

Bear Creek Golf and Country Club was designed by Jack Nicklaus, and Presidents Gerald Ford and Ronald Reagan have played there. The Golf Club at Rancho California was designed by Robert Trent Jones, Sr. Murrieta is also the site of the last operating Mulligan Family Fun Center location, an amusement park specializing in miniature golf.

== Government ==
Murrieta vote by party in presidential elections
Year	Democratic	Republican	Third Parties
2024	39.81% 20,227	57.77% 29,353	2.43% 1,234
2020	42.46% 23,184	55.52% 30,316	2.02% 1,103
2016	36.42% 14,887	57.35% 23,441	6.22% 2,543
2012	36.52% 13,520	61.58% 22,799	1.91% 706
2008	40.01% 14,573	58.49% 21,306	1.50% 548
2004	29.60% 8,988	69.61% 21,136	0.78% 238
2000	32.70% 5,690	64.75% 11,268	2.56% 445
1996	32.43% 4,317	57.52% 7,658	10.05% 1,338
1992	25.94% 2,874	45.97% 5,093	28.09% 3,112

In the United States House of Representatives, Murrieta is in California's 48th congressional district, represented by Republican Darrell Issa. In the United States Senate, California is represented by Democrats Alex Padilla and Adam Schiff.

In the California State Legislature, Murrieta is in the 32nd senatorial district, represented by Republican Kelly Seyarto, and in the 71st Assembly district, represented by Republican Kate Sanchez.

In the Riverside County Board of Supervisors, Murrieta is in the Third District, represented by Chuck Washington.

== Education ==
The majority of the city of Murrieta is served by the Murrieta Valley Unified School District (MVUSD). A portion is in the Menifee Union School District and the Perris Union High School District for grades 9–12.

The Murrieta district contains eleven elementary (K–5) schools, four middle (6–8) schools, three comprehensive high (9–12) schools (Murrieta Valley High School, Vista Murrieta High School, Murrieta Mesa High School), one continuation school (Creekside High School), and one independent study school.

Calvary Chapel Bible College operated at the Murrieta Hot Springs Resort site from 1994 until 2022. Its affiliated private comprehensive (K-9) school at Calvary Chapel Murrieta also serves the Murrieta community. There had been a senior high school in the Calvary Chapel Murrieta system, but it closed in 2019. Mt. San Jacinto College is the nearest community college (with locations in Temecula and Menifee) and the University of California, Riverside (UCR) is the nearest public university. The city is also home to a University of Phoenix learning center and an Azusa Pacific University satellite campus.

== Media ==
The area of southwest Riverside County is served by television station Channel 27, broadcast from a hilltop in Murrieta.

== Infrastructure ==
=== Transportation ===
Murrieta is served by two major Interstate highways: I-15 runs through the western portion of the city while I-215 runs through the eastern portion. Historic U.S. Route 395 (Jefferson Avenue/Ivy Street/Washington Avenue) passes through the city's downtown, and State Route 79 (Winchester Road) defines much of the city's eastern border.

The Riverside Transit Agency (RTA)'s Routes 23, 61, 205, and 206 provide bus transit to Murrieta.

The French Valley Airport, used for general aviation, is located just east of the city limits.

The city may become host to the high-speed rail (HSR) that voters approved in 2008 with Prop 1A. The proposed HSR station is projected to handle 8,000 daily riders. The program-level HSR route alignment has placed this station near the I-15 and I-215 freeway interchange.

=== Public safety ===
The Murrieta Fire Department was an all-volunteer fire department for 38 years. In 1987, it became a municipal fire protection district. It has been the city's secondary paramedic service provider since 2000, AMR is the primary paramedic service provider. As of 2022, the department has five stations throughout the city, and operates a primary fleet of four type-1 engines, one quint-style truck, and two type-6 engines.

The Murrieta Police Department was founded in 1992. As of 2022, the department had about 100 sworn officers and approximately 50 support staff.

=== Hospitals ===
Murrieta is served by two hospitals: Loma Linda University Medical Center and Rancho Springs Medical Center.

== Notable people ==
- Ambyr Childers, actress, raised in Murrieta
- Charlotte Rose Craig, Taekwondo Olympic Medalist in 2008
- Lindsay Davenport, professional tennis player and Olympic gold medalist, graduated from Murrieta Valley High School in 1994
- Meghan Dizon, professional pickleball player
- Taylor Edwards, professional softball player, grew up in Murrieta and graduated from Vista Murrieta High School in 2010
- Rickie Fowler, professional golfer
- Tyler Glenn and Christopher Allen of Neon Trees
- Javelin Guidry, professional football player
- Floyd Landis, former cyclist, disqualified participant of the 2006 Tour de France, lives in Murrieta with his family when not racing or training
- Michael Norman, sprinter and Olympic Gold Medalist, ran track and graduated from Vista Murrieta High School
- Ryan Navarro, American football player, raised in Murrieta and played football at Vista Murrieta High School
- Inbee Park, professional golfer, winner of five LPGA major championships
- Tom Pernice Jr., professional golfer and two-time winner on the PGA Tour, lives in Murrieta
- Olivia Rodrigo, singer-songwriter and actress
- Kelly Seyarto, firefighter and politician, former mayor of Murrieta, member of the California State Senate from the 32nd district
- Khalil Shakir, American football wide receiver for the Buffalo Bills graduated from Vista Murrieta High School
- Tyler Wade, Major League Baseball player
- Tyree Washington, track athlete, world record holder in the 4×400 m relay and five-event IAAF World Championship gold medalist (1997, 2003 world; 2006 – world indoor)
- Patrick Wisdom, Major League Baseball player
- Evan Mobley, player for the Cleveland Cavaliers

== See also ==
- Murrieta Hogbacks
