= Murrieta Valley High School =

Public high school in California, U.S.

Coordinates: 33°33′49″N 117°13′40″W

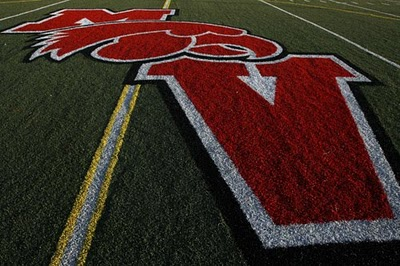

Location
- 42200 Nighthawk Way; Murrieta, California 92562; United States

Information
- Type: Public high school
- Established: 1990
- School district: Murrieta Valley Unified School District
- Principal: Stephen Diephouse
- Teaching staff: 93.72 (FTE)
- Grades: 9–12
- Enrollment: 2,104 (2024–2025)
- Student to teacher ratio: 22.45
- Colors: Red & black
- Mascot: Ned the Nighthawk
- Nickname: Nighthawks
- Website: nighthawks.murrieta.k12.ca.us

Murrieta Valley High School (MVHS), colloquially known as MV or The Valley, opened in 1990 as the first four-year comprehensive high school in Murrieta, California, United States. The school is nestled at the base of the Santa Rosa Plateau, at the western end of the city. It is operated by the Murrieta Valley Unified School District. MVHS is a California Distinguished School, and is fully accredited by the Western Association of Schools and Colleges.

== Feeder schools ==
- Elementary: Murrieta Elementary School, Cole Canyon Elementary School, Tovashal Elementary School
- Junior high: Thompson Middle School

== Achievements ==
The Murrieta Valley High School Mock Trial Team won the 2023 Riverside County Mock Trial Competition.

The Murrieta Valley High School Robotics Program has a history of excellence. The robotics program has often qualified to compete at the World Championship level. Led by teacher Kevin Bradley, Murrieta Valley High School's robotics program won the VEX Robotics World Championships in 2012.

== Notable alumni ==
- Bear Bachmeier, quarterback for the BYU Cougars
- Hank Bachmeier, professional football quarterback
- Keith Berry, wrestler and professional mixed martial artist
- Dean Connors, running back for the Los Angeles Rams
- Jorge Cordova, former professional football player, Jacksonville Jaguars and Tennessee Titans
- Lindsay Davenport, three-time Grand Slam tennis champion and Olympic gold medalist
- Rickie Fowler, professional golfer, PGA Tour
- Kevin Padlo, professional baseball player, Los Angeles Angels
- Brandon Rose, quarterback for the UMass Minutemen
- Tyler Wade, professional baseball player, San Diego Padres
- Patrick Wisdom, professional baseball player, Chicago Cubs
