= 2021 San Diego Padres season =

2021 San Diego Padres
- League: National League
- Division: West
- Ballpark: Petco Park
- City: San Diego, California
- Record: 79–83 (.488)
- Divisional place: 3rd
- Owners: Peter Seidler
- General managers: A. J. Preller
- Managers: Jayce Tingler
- Television: Bally Sports San Diego (Don Orsillo, Mark Grant, Mike Pomeranz, Mark Sweeney, Jesse Agler); Bally Deportes San Diego (Spanish)
- Radio: KWFN 97.3 FM (Jesse Agler, Tony Gwynn Jr., Mark Grant); XEMO 860 AM (Spanish) (Eduardo Ortega, Carlos Hernandez, Pedro Gutierrez)

The 2021 San Diego Padres season was the 53rd season of the San Diego Padres franchise. The Padres played their home games at Petco Park as members of Major League Baseball's National League West. The Padres entered the 2021 season expecting to contend for the World Series, having made several major acquisitions in the offseason, and held a playoff position in the Wild Card standings from April to late August. The Padres struggled down the stretch after reaching a season high 67-49 record, going 12-34 the rest of the way. The Padres were eliminated from playoff contention on September 25, and finished the 2021 season with a very disappointing record of 79–83.

On April 9, 2021, newly acquired Joe Musgrove pitched a 3–0 no-hitter against the Texas Rangers, the first no-hitter in San Diego Padres history. The no-hitter also broke a streak of having gone 8,205 games without throwing one, a major league record.

== Offseason ==
=== Acquisitions ===
Position	Player	2020 Team
SP	Joe Musgrove	Pittsburgh Pirates
SP	Yu Darvish	Chicago Cubs
CP	Mark Melancon	Atlanta Braves
SP	Blake Snell	Tampa Bay Rays
IF	Ha-seong Kim	Kiwoom Heroes (KBO)
C	Victor Caratini	Chicago Cubs
OF	Brian O'Grady	Tampa Bay Rays
RP	Nick Ramirez	Detroit Tigers
OF	Patrick Kivlehan	Toronto Blue Jays
RP	Nabil Crismatt	St. Louis Cardinals
OF	John Andreoli	Boston Red Sox
RP	Aaron Northcraft	Miami Marlins

=== Departures ===
Position	Player	2021 Team
SP	Zach Davies	Chicago Cubs
SP	Garrett Richards	Boston Red Sox
RP	Trevor Rosenthal	Oakland Athletics
1B	Mitch Moreland	Oakland Athletics
CP	Kirby Yates	Toronto Blue Jays
C	Francisco Mejia	Tampa Bay Rays
RP	Luis Perdomo	Milwaukee Brewers
SP	Joey Lucchesi	New York Mets
RP	David Bednar	Pittsburgh Pirates
IF	Greg Garcia	Detroit Tigers
RP	Luis Patiño	Tampa Bay Rays
C	Jason Castro	Houston Astros
OF	Abraham Almonte	Atlanta Braves

== Regular season ==
=== National League West ===
NL West
Team	W	L	Pct.	GB	Home	Road
San Francisco Giants	107	55	.660	—	54‍–‍27	53‍–‍28
Los Angeles Dodgers	106	56	.654	1	58‍–‍23	48‍–‍33
San Diego Padres	79	83	.488	28	45‍–‍36	34‍–‍47
Colorado Rockies	74	87	.460	32½	48‍–‍33	26‍–‍54
Arizona Diamondbacks	52	110	.321	55	32‍–‍49	20‍–‍61

=== National League Wild Card ===
Division leaders
Team	W	L	Pct.
San Francisco Giants	107	55	.660
Milwaukee Brewers	95	67	.586
Atlanta Braves	88	73	.547

Wild Card teams (Top 2 teams qualify for postseason)
Team	W	L	Pct.	GB
Los Angeles Dodgers	106	56	.654	+16
St. Louis Cardinals	90	72	.556	—
Cincinnati Reds	83	79	.512	7
Philadelphia Phillies	82	80	.506	8
San Diego Padres	79	83	.488	11
New York Mets	77	85	.475	13
Colorado Rockies	74	87	.460	15½
Chicago Cubs	71	91	.438	19
Miami Marlins	67	95	.414	23
Washington Nationals	65	97	.401	25
Pittsburgh Pirates	61	101	.377	29
Arizona Diamondbacks	52	110	.321	38

=== Record vs. opponents ===
2021 National League record Source: MLB Standings Grid – 2021
Team	AZ	ATL	CHC	CIN	COL	LAD	MIA	MIL	NYM	PHI	PIT	SD	SF	STL	WSH	AL
Arizona	—	3–4	2–4	5–1	9–10	3–16	2–5	1–6	1–5	4–3	4–2	8–11	2–17	1–6	3–4	4–16
Atlanta	4–3	—	5–2	4–3	2–4	2–4	11–8	3–3	10–9	10–9	4–3	4–2	3–3	6–1	14–5	6–14
Chicago	4–2	2–5	—	8–11	3–3	4–3	1–5	4–15	4–3	2–5	14–5	5–1	1–6	9–10	4–3	6–14
Cincinnati	1–5	3–4	11–8	—	5–2	3–3	5–2	9–10	3–3	4–2	13–6	1–6	1–6	10–9	5–2	9–11
Colorado	10–9	4–2	3–3	2–5	—	6–13	4–2	2–5	2–5	5–2	4–2	11–8	4–15	3–4	4–2	10–10
Los Angeles	16–3	4–2	3–4	3–3	13–6	—	3–4	4–3	6–1	4–2	6–0	12–7	9–10	4–3	7–0	12–8
Miami	5–2	8–11	5–1	2–5	2–4	4–3	—	3–3	9–10	10–9	2–5	3–4	3–4	0–6	8–11	3–17
Milwaukee	6–1	3–3	15–4	10–9	5–2	3–4	3–3	—	4–2	2–5	14–5	5–2	4–3	8–11	5–1	8–12
New York	5–1	9–10	3–4	3–3	5–2	1–6	10–9	2–4	—	9–10	3–4	4–3	1–5	2–5	11–8	9–11
Philadelphia	3–4	9–10	5–2	2–4	2–5	2–4	9–10	5–2	10–9	—	4–3	4–2	2–4	4–3	13–6	8–12
Pittsburgh	2–4	3–4	5–14	6–13	2–4	0–6	5–2	5–14	4–3	3–4	—	3–4	4–3	7–12	2–4	10–10
San Diego	11–8	2–4	1–5	6–1	8–11	7–12	4–3	2–5	3–4	2–4	4–3	—	8–11	3–3	4–3	14–6
San Francisco	17–2	3–3	6–1	6–1	15–4	10–9	4–3	3–4	5–1	4–2	3–4	11–8	—	2–4	5–2	13–7
St. Louis	6–1	1–6	10–9	9–10	4–3	3–4	6–0	11–8	5–2	3–4	12–7	3–3	4–2	—	2–4	11–9
Washington	4–3	5–14	3–4	2–5	2–4	0–7	11–8	1–5	8–11	6–13	4–2	3–4	2–5	4–2	—	10–10

=== Game log ===
2021 game log: 79–83 (Home: 45–36; Away: 34–47)
April: 15–12 (Home: 6–8; Away: 9–4)

#	Date	Opponent	Score	Win	Loss	Save	Attendance	Record	Streak
1	April 1	Diamondbacks	8–7	**Pagán** (1–0)	Young (0–1)	**Melancon** (1)	10,350	1–0	W1
2	April 2	Diamondbacks	4–2	**Pagán** (2–0)	Kelly (0–1)	**Melancon** (2)	10,350	2–0	W2
3	April 3	Diamondbacks	7–0	**Musgrove** (1–0)	Smith (0–1)	**Weathers** (1)	10,350	3–0	W3
4	April 4	Diamondbacks	1–3	Widener (1–0)	**Paddack** (0–1)	Devenski (1)	10,350	3–1	L1
5	April 5	Giants	2–3	Baragar (1–0)	**Stammen** (0–1)	McGee (2)	10,350	3–2	L2
6	April 6	Giants	4–1	**Kela** (1–0)	Wisler (0–1)	**Melancon** (3)	10,350	4–2	W1
7	April 7	Giants	2–3 (10)	Rogers (1–0)	**Hill** (0–1)	—	10,350	4–3	L1
8	April 9	@ Rangers	3–0	**Musgrove** (2–0)	Arihara (0–1)	—	27,575	5–3	W1
9	April 10	@ Rangers	7–4	**Weathers** (1–0)	Benjamin (0–1)	**Melancon** (4)	35,856	6–3	W2
10	April 11	@ Rangers	2–0	**Stammen** (1–1)	Foltynewicz (0–2)	**Melancon** (5)	26,723	7–3	W3
11	April 12	@ Pirates	6–2	**Darvish** (1–0)	Oviedo (0–1)	—	4,068	8–3	W4
12	April 13	@ Pirates	4–8	Stratton (1–0)	**Crismatt** (0–1)	—	4,814	8–4	L1
13	April 14	@ Pirates	1–5	Anderson (1–2)	**Musgrove** (2–1)	—	5,228	8–5	L2
14	April 15	@ Pirates	8–3	**Paddack** (1–1)	Keller (1–2)	**Stammen** (1)	4,023	9–5	W1
15	April 16	Dodgers	6–11 (12)	Price (1–0)	**Hill** (0–2)	—	15,250	9–6	L1
16	April 17	Dodgers	0–2	Kershaw (3–1)	**Darvish** (1–1)	González (1)	15,250	9–7	L2
17	April 18	Dodgers	5–2	**Kela** (2–0)	Alexander (0–1)	**Melancon** (6)	15,250	10–7	W1
18	April 19	Brewers	1–3	Woodruff (1–0)	**Musgrove** (2–2)	Hader (2)	15,250	10–8	L1
19	April 20	Brewers	0–6	Burnes (2–1)	**Paddack** (1–2)	—	15,250	10–9	L2
20	April 21	Brewers	2–4	Suter (1–1)	**Kela** (2–1)	Hader (3)	15,250	10–10	L3
21	April 22	@ Dodgers	3–2	**Crismatt** (1–1)	Treinen (1–1)	**Melancon** (7)	15,167	11–10	W1
22	April 23	@ Dodgers	6–1	**Darvish** (2–1)	Kershaw (3–2)	—	15,222	12–10	W2
23	April 24	@ Dodgers	4–5	Bauer (3–0)	**Johnson** (0–1)	Jansen (5)	15,596	12–11	L1
24	April 25	@ Dodgers	8–7 (11)	**Hill** (1–2)	Cleavinger (0–1)	**Melancon** (8)	15,316	13–11	W1
25	April 27	@ Diamondbacks	1–5	Kelly (2–2)	**Paddack** (1–3)	—	10,486	13–12	L1
26	April 28	@ Diamondbacks	12–3	**Northcraft** (1–0)	Smith (1–1)	—	9,495	14–12	W1
27	April 30	Giants	3–2	**Darvish** (3–1)	Webb (1–2)	**Melancon** (9)	15,250	15–12	W2

May: 19–9 (Home: 12–2; Away: 7–7)

#	Date	Opponent	Score	Win	Loss	Save	Attendance	Record	Streak
28	May 1	Giants	6–2	**Snell** (1–0)	DeSclafani (2–1)	—	15,250	16–12	W3
29	May 2	Giants	1–7	Gausman (2–0)	**Musgrove** (2–3)	—	15,250	16–13	L1
30	May 3	Pirates	2–0	**Hill** (2–2)	Anderson (2–3)	**Melancon** (10)	15,250	17–13	W1
31	May 4	Pirates	1–2	Keller (2–3)	**Weathers** (1–1)	Rodríguez (5)	15,250	17–14	L1
32	May 5	Pirates	4–2	**Stammen** (2–1)	Underwood Jr. (1–1)	**Melancon** (11)	15,250	18–14	W1
33	May 7	@ Giants	4–5	Doval (1–1)	**Kela** (2–2)	McGee (8)	9,219	18–15	L1
34	May 8	@ Giants	1–7	Gausman (3–0)	**Musgrove** (2–4)	—	9,764	18–16	L2
35	May 9	@ Giants	11–1	**Weathers** (2–1)	Cueto (2–1)	—	10,008	19–16	W1
—	May 10	@ Rockies	Postponed (rain, makeup May 12)						
36	May 11	@ Rockies	8–1	**Díaz** (1–0)	Senzatela (1–4)	—	8,825	20–16	W2
37	May 12 (1)	@ Rockies	5–3 (7)	**Pagán** (3–0)	Gray (4–3)	**Melancon** (12)	N/A	21–16	W3
38	May 12 (2)	@ Rockies	2–3 (8)	Almonte (1–1)	**Ramirez** (0–1)	—	11,968	21–17	L1
39	May 14	Cardinals	5–4	**Musgrove** (3–4)	Oviedo (0–2)	**Melancon** (13)	15,250	22–17	W1
40	May 15	Cardinals	13–3	**Díaz** (2–0)	Wainwright (2–4)	—	15,250	23–17	W2
41	May 16	Cardinals	5–3	**Lamet** (1–0)	Kim (1–1)	**Melancon** (14)	15,250	24–17	W3
42	May 17	Rockies	7–0	**Darvish** (4–1)	Gray (4–4)	—	15,250	25–17	W4
43	May 18	Rockies	2–1 (10)	**Johnson** (1–1)	Bard (1–3)	—	15,250	26–17	W5
44	May 19	Rockies	3–0	**Musgrove** (4–4)	Gonzalez (2–2)	**Melancon** (15)	15,250	27–17	W6
45	May 21	Mariners	16–1	**Paddack** (2–3)	Flexen (4–2)	—	15,250	28–17	W7
46	May 22	Mariners	6–4	**Stammen** (3–1)	Sheffield (3–4)	**Melancon** (16)	15,250	29–17	W8
47	May 23	Mariners	9–2	**Darvish** (5–1)	Misiewicz (2–3)	—	15,250	30–17	W9
48	May 24	@ Brewers	3–5	Woodruff (3–2)	**Snell** (1–1)	Hader (11)	14,524	30–18	L1
49	May 25	@ Brewers	7–1	**Hill** (3–2)	Burnes (2–4)	—	13,566	31–18	W1
50	May 26	@ Brewers	2–1 (10)	**Adams** (1–0)	Suter (3–3)	**Melancon** (17)	13,478	32–18	W2
51	May 27	@ Brewers	5–6 (10)	Suter (4–3)	**Díaz** (2–1)	—	13,572	32–19	L1
52	May 28	@ Astros	10–3 (11)	**Melancon** (1–0)	Raley (2–3)	—	32,045	33–19	W1
53	May 29	@ Astros	11–8 (12)	**Adams** (2–0)	Garza (0–1)	**Díaz** (1)	31,323	34–19	W2
54	May 30	@ Astros	4–7	Greinke (5–2)	**Snell** (1–2)	—	29,019	34–20	L1
55	May 31	@ Cubs	2–7	Stewart (1–0)	**Paddack** (2–4)	—	24,824	34–21	L2

June: 15–12 (Home: 12–5; Away: 3–7)

#	Date	Opponent	Score	Win	Loss	Save	Attendance	Record	Streak
56	June 1	@ Cubs	3–4	Hendricks (6–4)	**Weathers** (2–2)	Kimbrel (13)	24,824	34–22	L2
57	June 2	@ Cubs	1–6	Alzolay (4–4)	**Johnson** (1–2)	—	24,824	34–23	L3
58	June 3	Mets	4–3	**Darvish** (6–1)	Walker (4–2)	**Melancon** (18)	15,250	35–23	W1
59	June 4	Mets	2–0	**Snell** (2–2)	Lucchesi (1–4)	**Melancon** (19)	15,250	36–23	W2
60	June 5	Mets	0–4	deGrom (5–2)	**Musgrove** (4–5)	—	15,250	36–24	L1
61	June 6	Mets	2–6	Stroman (5–4)	**Paddack** (2–5)	—	15,250	36–25	L2
62	June 7	Cubs	9–4	**Weathers** (3–2)	Alzolay (4–5)	—	15,250	37–25	W1
63	June 8	Cubs	1–7	Davies (3–3)	**Lamet** (1–1)	—	16,207	37–26	L1
64	June 9	Cubs	1–3	Brothers (2–0)	**Darvish** (6–2)	Kimbrel (15)	15,250	37–27	L2
65	June 11	@ Mets	2–3	deGrom (6–2)	**Snell** (2–3)	Díaz (11)	26,637	37–28	L3
66	June 12	@ Mets	1–4	Stroman (6–4)	**Musgrove** (4–6)	Díaz (12)	25,463	37–29	L4
67	June 13	@ Mets	7–3	**Paddack** (3–5)	Familia (2–1)	—	19,581	38–29	W1
68	June 14	@ Rockies	2–3	Gomber (6–5)	**Lamet** (1–2)	Bard (9)	23,027	38–30	L1
69	June 15	@ Rockies	4–8	Estévez (1–0)	**Hill** (3–3)	—	22,871	38–31	L2
70	June 16	@ Rockies	7–8	Estévez (2–0)	**Adams** (2–1)	—	18,798	38–32	L3
71	June 17	Reds	6–4	**Johnson** (2–2)	Garrett (0–2)	—	40,362	39–32	W1
72	June 18	Reds	8–2	**Paddack** (4–5)	Santillan (0–1)	—	33,456	40–32	W2
73	June 19	Reds	7–5	**Crismatt** (2–1)	Hembree (1–2)	**Melancon** (20)	38,765	41–32	W3
74	June 20	Reds	3–2	**Lamet** (2–2)	Castillo (2–10)	**Melancon** (21)	38,004	42–32	W4
75	June 21	Dodgers	6–2	**Darvish** (7–2)	Urías (9–3)	—	42,220	43–32	W5
76	June 22	Dodgers	3–2	**Snell** (3–3)	Kershaw (8–7)	**Melancon** (22)	42,667	44–32	W6
77	June 23	Dodgers	5–3	**Hill** (4–3)	Treinen (1–3)	**Melancon** (23)	43,691	45–32	W7
78	June 25	Diamondbacks	11–5	**Ramirez** (1–1)	Martin (0–3)	—	32,583	46–32	W8
79	June 26	Diamondbacks	1–10	Kelly (4–7)	**Lamet** (2–3)	—	40,557	46–33	L1
80	June 27	Diamondbacks	5–4	**Hill** (5–3)	Peacock (2–6)	**Melancon** (24)	34,905	47–33	W1
81	June 29	@ Reds	5–4	**Pagán** (4–0)	Santillan (1–2)	**Melancon** (25)	16,332	48–33	W2
82	June 30	@ Reds	7–5 (6)	**Musgrove** (5–6)	Gutiérrez (3–3)	**Hill** (1)	12,084	49–33	W3

July: 11–14 (Home: 5–7; Away: 6–7)

#	Date	Opponent	Score	Win	Loss	Save	Attendance	Record	Streak
83	July 1	@ Reds	4–5	Warren (1–0)	**Melancon** (1–1)	—	16,620	49–34	L1
84	July 2	@ Phillies	3–4 (10)	Suárez (4–2)	**Adams** (2–2)	—	22,653	49–35	L2
85	July 3	@ Phillies	2–4	Eflin (3–6)	**Darvish** (7–3)	Suárez (1)	25,053	49–36	L3
86	July 4	@ Phillies	11–1	**Adams** (3–2)	Velasquez (3–3)	—	25,592	50–36	W1
87	July 5	Nationals	5–7	Suero (1–2)	**Hill** (5–4)	Hand (19)	33,168	50–37	L1
88	July 6	Nationals	7–4	**Weathers** (4–2)	Fedde (4–5)	**Melancon** (26)	29,977	51–37	W1
89	July 7	Nationals	5–15	Corbin (6–7)	**Paddack** (4–6)	—	26,353	51–38	L1
90	July 8	Nationals	9–8	**Melancon** (2–1)	Clay (0–2)	—	29,434	52–38	W1
91	July 9	Rockies	4–2	**Díaz** (3–1)	Freeland (1–3)	**Melancon** (27)	34,953	53–38	W2
92	July 10	Rockies	0–3	Márquez (8–6)	**Musgrove** (5–7)	Bard (13)	42,351	53–39	L1
93	July 11	Rockies	1–3	Gray (6–6)	**Stammen** (3–2)	Bard (14)	38,235	53–40	L2
**91st All-Star Game in Denver, CO**
Representing the Padres: Fernando Tatís Jr., Jake Cronenworth, Manny Machado, Yu Darvish, & Mark Melancon
94	July 16	@ Nationals	24–8	**Paddack** (5–6)	Fedde (4–7)	—	29,203	54–40	W1
95	July 17 (Note: game suspended in the middle of the 6th inning with the Padres leading 8–4 because of the gun shooting outside Nationals Park; game completed on July 18 before the regularly scheduled game)/18	@ Nationals	10–4	**Stammen** (4–2)	Corbin (6–8)	—	33,232	55–40	W2
96	July 18	@ Nationals	7–8	Hand (5–2)	**Melancon** (2–2)	—	27,221	55–41	L1
—	July 19	@ Braves	Postponed (Rain, makeup July 21)						
97	July 20	@ Braves	1–2	Toussaint (1–0)	**Darvish** (7–4)	Smith (19)	36,621	55–42	L2
98	July 21 (1)	@ Braves	3–2 (7)	**Paddack** (6–6)	Muller (1–3)	**Melancon** (28)	28,621	56–42	W1
—	July 21 (2)	@ Braves	Suspended (Rain, Makeup: September 24)						
99	July 22	@ Marlins	3–2	**Snell** (4–3)	Holloway (2–3)	**Melancon** (29)	10,977	57–42	W2
100	July 23	@ Marlins	5–2	**Musgrove** (6–7)	Thompson (2–3)	**Melancon** (30)	9,264	58–42	W3
101	July 24	@ Marlins	2–3	Garrett (1–1)	**Hill** (5–5)	García (15)	13,207	58–43	L1
102	July 25	@ Marlins	3–9	Bender (2–1)	**Darvish** (7–5)	—	12,765	58–44	L2
103	July 27	Athletics	7–4	**Paddack** (7–6)	Kaprielian (5–4)	**Melancon** (31)	40,162	59–44	W1
104	July 28	Athletics	4–10	Manaea (8–6)	**Snell** (4–4)	—	35,351	59–45	L1
105	July 29	Rockies	3–0	**Musgrove** (7–7)	Freeland (1–6)	**Melancon** (32)	31,884	60–45	W1
106	July 30	Rockies	4–9	Gray (7–6)	**Weathers** (4–3)	—	38,686	60–46	L1
107	July 31	Rockies	3–5	Márquez (9–8)	**Darvish** (7–6)	Bard (16)	44,144	60–47	L2

August: 11–15 (Home: 6–7; Away: 5–8)

#	Date	Opponent	Score	Win	Loss	Save	Attendance	Record	Streak
108	August 1	Rockies	8–1	**Stammen** (5–2)	Gomber (8–6)	—	36,247	61–47	W1
109	August 3	@ Athletics	8–1	**Snell** (5–4)	Manaea (8–7)	—	11,985	62–47	W2
110	August 4	@ Athletics	4–5 (10)	Trivino (4–4)	**Hill** (5–6)	—	10,648	62–48	L1
111	August 6	Diamondbacks	5–8	Peacock (5–6)	**Weathers** (4–4)	Poppen (1)	34,038	62–49	L2
112	August 7	Diamondbacks	6–2	**Pomeranz** (1–0)	de Geus (2–1)	—	39,134	63–49	W1
113	August 8	Diamondbacks	2–0	**Snell** (6–4)	Bumgarner (6–7)	**Melancon** (33)	30,989	64–49	W2
114	August 9	Marlins	8–3	**Musgrove** (8–7)	Thompson (2–5)	—	26,841	65–49	W3
115	August 10	Marlins	6–5	**Johnson** (3–2)	Bleier (2-2)	**Melancon** (34)	32,060	66–49	W4
116	August 11	Marlins	0–7	Alcántara (7–10)	**Weathers** (4–5)	—	29,753	66–50	L1
117	August 12	@ Diamondbacks	3–12	Smith (4–8)	**Darvish** (7–7)	—	9,086	66–51	L2
118	August 13	@ Diamondbacks	2–3	Clippard (1–0)	**Stammen** (5–3)	—	12,866	66–52	L3
119	August 14	@ Diamondbacks	0–7	Gilbert (1–1)	**Musgrove** (8–8)	—	16,716	66–53	L4
120	August 15	@ Diamondbacks	8–2	**Knehr** (1–0)	Gallen (1–7)	—	17,722	67–53	W1
121	August 16	@ Rockies	5–6	Bard (6–5)	**Hudson** (4–2)	—	24,565	67–54	L1
122	August 17	@ Rockies	3–7	Márquez (11–9)	**Strahm** (0–1)	—	28,139	67–55	L2
123	August 18	@ Rockies	5–7	Bowden (2–2)	**Arrieta** (5–12)	Bard (20)	20,692	67–56	L3
124	August 20	Phillies	3–4	Neris (2–5)	**Snell** (6–5)	Kennedy (20)	40,927	67–57	L4
125	August 21	Phillies	4–3 (10)	**Melancon** (3–2)	Brogdon (5–3)	—	43,383	68–57	W1
126	August 22	Phillies	4–7	Gibson (9–5)	**Weathers** (4–6)	—	38,548	68–58	L1
127	August 24	Dodgers	2–5	Urías (14–3)	**Johnson** (3–3)	Jansen (28)	41,676	68–59	L2
128	August 25	Dodgers	3–5 (16)	Knebel (3–0)	**Camarena** (0–1)	Greene (1)	41,765	68–60	L3
129	August 26	Dodgers	0–4	Scherzer (12–4)	**Darvish** (7–8)	—	43,383	68–61	L4
130	August 27	@ Angels	5–0	**Musgrove** (9–8)	Criswell (0–1)	—	25,376	69–61	W1
131	August 28	@ Angels	2–10	Wantz (1–0)	**Weathers** (4–7)	—	36,176	69–62	L1
132	August 30	@ Diamondbacks	7–5	**Stammen** (6–3)	Gilbert (1–2)	**Melancon** (35)	8,482	70–62	W1
133	August 31	@ Diamondbacks	3–0	**Snell** (7–5)	Gallen (2–8)	**Melancon** (36)	10,818	71–62	W2

September: 7–19 (Home: 4–7; Away: 3–12)

#	Date	Opponent	Score	Win	Loss	Save	Attendance	Record	Streak
134	September 1	@ Diamondbacks	3–8	Weaver (3–3)	**Darvish** (7–9)	—	5,945	71–63	L1
135	September 3	Astros	3–6	Taylor (3–4)	**Pagán** (4–1)	Pressly (23)	37,033	71–64	L2
136	September 4	Astros	10–2	**Musgrove** (10–8)	Valdez (9–5)	—	35,338	72–64	W1
137	September 5	Astros	4–3	**Melancon** (4–2)	Stanek (1–4)	—	35,007	73–64	W2
138	September 7	Angels	0–4	Herget (2–1)	**Snell** (7–6)	—	34,405	73–65	L1
139	September 8	Angels	8–5	**Darvish** (8–9)	Mayers (3–4)	**Melancon** (37)	34,537	74–65	W1
140	September 10	@ Dodgers	0–3	Urías (17–3)	**Musgrove** (10–9)	Jansen (31)	48,403	74–66	L1
141	September 11	@ Dodgers	4–5	Buehler (14–3)	**Paddack** (7–7)	Jansen (32)	46,969	74–67	L2
142	September 12	@ Dodgers	0–8	Scherzer (14–4)	**Lamet** (2–4)	—	42,637	74–68	L3
143	September 13	@ Giants	1–9	Littell (3–0)	**Darvish** (8–10)	—	21,078	74–69	L4
144	September 14	@ Giants	1–6	DeSclafani (12–6)	**Arrieta** (5–13)	—	23,192	74–70	L5
145	September 15	@ Giants	9–6	**Musgrove** (11–9)	Leone (3–4)	—	21,212	75–70	W1
146	September 16	@ Giants	7–4	**Crismatt** (3–1)	Gausman (14–6)	—	23,379	76–70	W2
147	September 17	@ Cardinals	2–8	Mikolas (1–2)	**Velasquez** (3–7)	—	30,937	76–71	L1
148	September 18	@ Cardinals	2–3	Miller (1–0)	**Pagán** (4–2)	Gallegos (9)	40,626	76–72	L2
149	September 19	@ Cardinals	7–8	Reyes (9–8)	**Arrieta** (5–14)	Gallegos (10)	35,326	76–73	L3
150	September 21	Giants	5–6	Watson (6–4)	**Melancon** (4–3)	Rogers (13)	36,439	76–74	L4
151	September 22	Giants	6–8	Doval (4–1)	**Velasquez** (3–8)	—	38,189	76–75	L5
152	September 23	Giants	7–6 (10)	**Detwiler** (3–1)	Leone (3–5)	—	31,049	77–75	W1
153	September 24 (1)	@ Braves	6–5 (7)	**Hudson** (5–1)	Smith (3–6)	**Melancon** (29)	N/A	78–75	W2
154	September 24 (2)	Braves	0–4	Fried (13–7)	**Knehr** (1–1)	—	33,265	78–76	L1
155	September 25	Braves	8–10 (10)	Rodríguez (5–4)	**Hudson** (5–3)	Smith (34)	39,026	78–77	L2
156	September 26	Braves	3–4	Minter (3–6)	**Johnson** (3–4)	Smith (35)	41,294	78–78	L3
157	September 28	@ Dodgers	1–2	Buehler (15–4)	**Darvish** (8–11)	Treinen (7)	52,128	78–79	L4
158	September 29	@ Dodgers	9–11	Price (5–2)	**Pagán** (4–3)	Jansen (37)	45,366	78–80	L5
159	September 30	@ Dodgers	3–8	Knebel (4–0)	**Velasquez** (3–9)	—	52,550	78–81	L6

October: 1–2 (Home: 0–0; Away: 1–2)

#	Date	Opponent	Score	Win	Loss	Save	Attendance	Record	Streak
160	October 1	@ Giants	0–3	DeSclafani (13–7)	**Ávila** (0–1)	Doval (3)	33,975	78–82	L7
161	October 2	@ Giants	3–2 (10)	**Hill** (6–6)	Castro (1–1)	**Melancon** (39)	40,760	79–82	W1
162	October 3	@ Giants	4–11	Webb (11–3)	**Knehr** (1–2)	—	36,901	79–83	L1

Legend: = Win = Loss = Postponement
Bold = Padres team member

== Trade Deadline ==
July 25: Tucupita Marcano, Jack Suwinski, & Michell Miliano to the Pittsburgh Pirates in exchange for 2B Adam Frazier

July 30: Mason Thompson & Jordy Barley to the Washington Nationals in exchange for RP Daniel Hudson

July 30: Anderson Espinoza to the Chicago Cubs for OF Jake Marisnick

== Roster ==
2021 San Diego Padres
Roster
Pitchers: 54 Austin Adams; 57 Dan Altavilla; 64 Shaun Anderson; 49 Jake Arrieta; 60 Pedro Ávila; 72 Daniel Camarena; 74 Nabil Crismatt; 11 Yu Darvish; 45 Ross Detwiler; 37 Miguel Díaz; 8 Javy Guerra; 25 Tim Hill; 18 Daniel Hudson; 36 Pierce Johnson; 27 Keone Kela; 73 Reiss Knehr; 29 Dinelson Lamet; 33 Mark Melancon; 50 Adrián Morejón; 44 Joe Musgrove; 43 Aaron Northcraft; 67 James Norwood; 59 Chris Paddack; 14 Emilio Pagán; 15 Drew Pomeranz; 47 Nick Ramirez; 4 Blake Snell; 34 Craig Stammen; 55 Matt Strahm; 71 Mason Thompson; 38 Vince Velasquez; 40 Ryan Weathers; 45 Taylor Williams	Catchers: 21 Luis Campusano; 17 Víctor Caratini; 26 Austin Nola; 48 Webster Rivas; Infielders: 61 Iván Castillo; 9 Jake Cronenworth; 12 Adam Frazier; 30 Eric Hosmer; 7 Ha-seong Kim; 13 Manny Machado; 23 Fernando Tatís Jr.	Outfielders: 22 John Andreoli; 2 Trent Grisham; 18 Patrick Kivlehan; 16 Tucupita Marcano; 16 Jake Marisnick; 3 Jorge Mateo; 5 Wil Myers; 24 Brian O'Grady; 28 Tommy Pham; 10 Jurickson Profar	Manager: 32 Jayce Tingler; Coaches: 20 Rod Barajas (catching/quality control); 22 Bobby Dickerson (bench/third base); 46 Damion Easley (hitting); 84 Ryan Flaherty (advance scout/development); 89 Brad Flanders (bullpen catcher); 53 Ben Fritz (interim pitching coach); 41 Wayne Kirby (first base); 38 Larry Rothschild (pitching); 56 Skip Schumaker (associate manager); 83 Peter Summerville (bullpen catcher/coaching assistant); 82 Keith Werman (development coordinator)

== Player stats ==
=== Batting ===
Note: G = Games played; AB = At bats; R = Runs; H = Hits; 2B = Doubles; 3B = Triples; HR = Home runs; RBI = Runs batted in; SB = Stolen bases; BB = Walks; AVG = Batting average; SLG = Slugging average

Player	G	AB	R	H	2B	3B	HR	RBI	SB	BB	AVG	SLG
Jake Cronenworth	152	567	94	151	33	7	21	71	4	55	.266	.460
Manny Machado	153	564	92	157	31	2	28	106	12	63	.278	.489
Eric Hosmer	151	509	53	137	28	0	12	65	5	48	.269	.395
Fernando Tatís Jr.	130	478	99	135	31	0	42	97	25	62	.282	.611
Tommy Pham	155	475	74	109	24	2	15	49	14	78	.229	.383
Trent Grisham	132	462	61	112	28	3	15	62	13	54	.242	.413
Wil Myers	146	442	56	113	24	2	17	63	8	54	.256	.434
Jurickson Profar	137	353	47	80	17	2	4	33	10	49	.227	.320
Victor Caratini	116	313	33	71	9	0	7	39	2	35	.227	.323
Ha-seong Kim	117	267	27	54	12	2	8	34	6	22	.202	.352
Adam Frazier	57	191	25	51	8	1	1	11	5	13	.267	.335
Austin Nola	56	173	15	47	12	0	2	29	0	14	.272	.376
Jorge Mateo	57	87	10	18	4	0	2	6	5	2	.207	.322
Webster Rivas	24	68	8	15	2	0	2	4	0	8	.221	.338
Brian O'Grady	32	51	8	8	3	0	2	9	0	8	.157	.333
Jake Marisnick	34	48	4	9	1	0	0	2	1	2	.188	.208
Tucupita Marcano	25	44	7	8	1	0	0	3	0	6	.182	.205
Luis Campusano	11	34	0	3	0	0	0	1	0	4	.088	.088
John Andreoli	7	6	2	1	1	0	0	0	0	1	.167	.333
Patrick Kivlehan	5	4	3	1	0	0	0	2	0	2	.250	.250
Iván Castillo	3	3	0	1	0	0	0	1	0	1	.333	.333
Pitcher totals	162	248	11	24	4	0	2	8	0	5	.098	.139
Team totals	162	5384	729	1305	273	21	180	695	110	586	.242	.401

=== Pitching ===
Note: W = Wins; L = Losses; ERA = Earned run average; G = Games pitched; GS = Games started; SV = Saves; IP = Innings pitched; H = Hits allowed; R = Runs allowed; ER = Earned runs allowed; BB = Walks allowed; SO = Strikeouts

Player	W	L	ERA	G	GS	SV	IP	H	R	ER	BB	SO
Joe Musgrove	11	9	3.18	32	31	0	181.1	142	68	64	54	203
Yu Darvish	8	11	4.22	30	30	0	166.1	138	81	78	44	199
Blake Snell	7	6	4.20	27	27	0	128.2	101	61	60	69	170
Chris Paddack	7	7	5.07	23	22	0	108.1	115	67	61	22	99
Ryan Weathers	4	7	5.32	30	18	1	94.2	101	57	56	30	72
Craig Stammen	6	3	3.06	67	4	1	88.1	79	31	30	13	83
Nabil Crismatt	3	1	3.76	45	0	0	81.1	87	40	34	24	71
Mark Melancon	4	3	2.23	64	0	39	64.2	54	21	16	25	59
Emilio Pagán	4	3	4.83	67	0	0	63.1	56	35	34	18	69
Tim Hill	6	6	3.62	78	0	1	59.2	51	34	24	23	56
Pierce Johnson	3	4	3.22	63	2	0	58.2	47	21	21	27	77
Austin Adams	3	2	4.10	65	0	0	52.2	28	28	24	35	76
Dinelson Lamet	2	4	4.40	22	9	0	47.0	48	24	23	22	57
Miguel Díaz	3	1	3.64	25	2	1	42.0	31	19	17	19	46
Reiss Knehr	1	2	4.97	12	5	0	29.0	23	16	16	20	20
Drew Pomeranz	1	0	1.75	27	0	0	25.2	19	6	5	10	30
Nick Ramirez	1	1	5.75	13	0	0	20.1	23	15	13	7	14
Daniel Hudson	1	2	5.21	23	0	0	19.0	17	13	11	9	27
Vince Velasquez	0	3	8.53	4	4	0	12.2	15	13	12	4	16
Jake Arrieta	0	3	10.95	4	4	0	12.1	18	16	15	5	9
Keone Kela	2	2	5.06	12	0	0	10.2	11	8	6	3	13
Daniel Camarena	0	1	9.64	6	0	0	9.1	16	12	10	3	7
Aaron Northcraft	1	0	2.25	5	0	0	8.0	5	2	2	8	5
Ross Detwiler	1	0	2.57	7	0	0	7.0	3	2	2	5	6
Matt Strahm	0	1	8.10	6	1	0	6.2	15	6	6	1	4
Taylor Williams	0	0	1.69	5	0	0	5.1	3	1	1	3	6
James Norwood	0	0	0.00	5	0	0	5.0	6	0	0	3	3
Adrián Morejón	0	0	3.86	2	2	0	4.2	5	2	2	2	3
Shaun Anderson	0	0	5.79	5	0	0	4.2	6	3	3	2	4
Pedro Ávila	0	1	2.25	1	1	0	4.0	4	2	1	3	5
Javy Guerra	0	0	4.91	4	0	0	3.2	4	2	2	2	3
Mason Thompson	0	0	3.00	4	0	0	3.0	4	1	1	1	2
Dan Altavilla	0	0	6.75	2	0	0	1.1	1	1	1	0	2
Jake Cronenworth	0	0	0.00	1	0	0	0.2	1	0	0	0	1
Team totals	79	83	4.10	162	162	43	1430.0	1277	708	651	516	1517

== Farm system ==
Level	Team	League	Manager	W	L	Position
Triple-A	El Paso Chihuahuas	Triple-A West	Edwin Rodríguez	46	74	5th
Double-A	San Antonio Missions	Double-A Central	Phillip Wellman	57	63	4th
High-A	Fort Wayne TinCaps	High-A Central	Anthony Contreras	54	66	6th
Low-A	Lake Elsinore Storm	Low-A West	Mike McCoy	55	65	3rd
Rookie	ACL Padres	Arizona Complex League	Vinny Lopez	26	32	4th
Rookie	DSL Padres	Dominican Summer League	Miguel Del Castillo	37	21	2nd
