= Dustin Peterson =

American baseball player (born 1994)

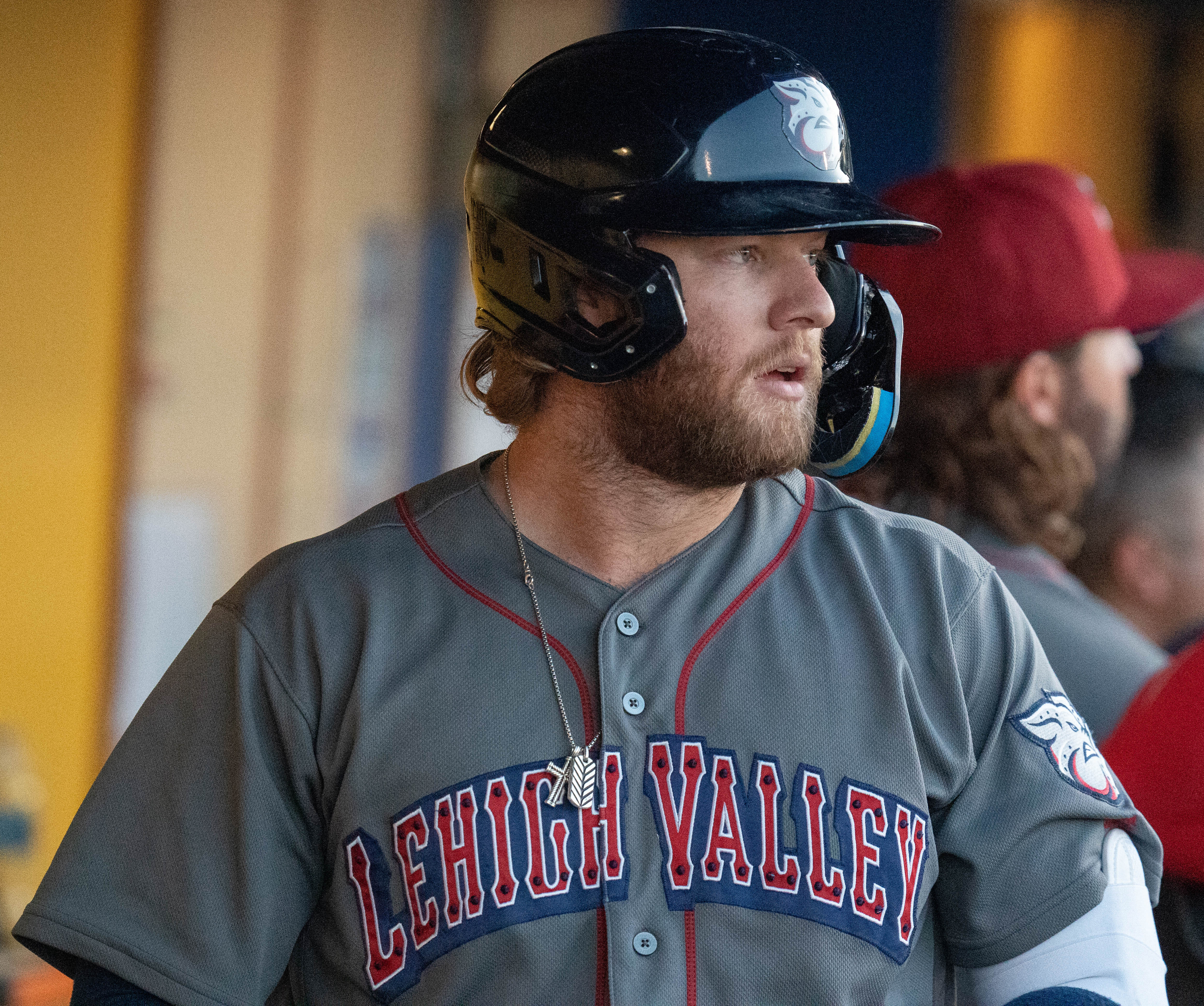
- Peterson with the Lehigh Valley IronPigs in 2022

Free agent
- Outfielder
- Born: September 10, 1994 (age 31); Phoenix, Arizona, U.S.
- Bats: Right Throws: Right

MLB debut
- May 28, 2018, for the Atlanta Braves

MLB statistics (through 2019 season)
- Batting average: .217
- Home runs: 0
- Runs batted in: 6
- Stats at Baseball Reference

Teams
- Atlanta Braves (2018); Detroit Tigers (2019)

Dustin Allen Peterson (born September 10, 1994) is an American professional baseball outfielder who is a free agent. He has previously played in Major League Baseball (MLB) for the Atlanta Braves and Detroit Tigers.

== Career ==
Peterson attended Gilbert High School in Gilbert, Arizona. He played for the school's baseball team as a shortstop. As a senior, Peterson had a .540 batting average and hit 10 home runs with 39 runs batted in (RBIs). Peterson committed to attend Arizona State University on a college baseball scholarship to play for the Arizona State Sun Devils.

=== San Diego Padres ===
Baseball America ranked Peterson as the 44th best available prospect in the 2013 Major League Baseball draft. The San Diego Padres selected Peterson in the second round, with the 50th overall selection, of the draft. Peterson signed with the Padres, rather than attend college. The Padres converted Peterson into a third baseman. He made his professional debut with the Arizona Padres of the Rookie-level Arizona League after he signed, and he batted .293 in 38 games. In 2014, Peterson played for the Fort Wayne TinCaps of the Single–A Midwest League, where he batted .233 with ten home runs and 79 RBIs.

=== Atlanta Braves ===
On December 19, 2014, the Padres traded Peterson, Max Fried, Jace Peterson, and Mallex Smith to the Atlanta Braves in exchange for Justin Upton and Aaron Northcraft. Following the trade, Peterson began to see playing time in the outfield. Peterson spent 2015 with the Carolina Mudcats of the High–A Carolina League, where he posted a .251 batting average with 8 home runs and 62 RBIs. In 2016, Peterson played for the Mississippi Braves of the Double–A Southern League, where he batted .282 with 12 home runs and 88 RBIs. After the 2016 season, the Braves assigned Peterson to the Salt River Rafters of the Arizona Fall League. In 2017, Peterson played for the Gwinnett Braves of the Triple–A International League, where he batted .248 with one home run and 30 RBIs in 87 games.

On May 28, 2018, Peterson's contract was selected by the Braves to replace Ronald Acuña Jr. while on the disabled list. The Braves designated Peterson for assignment on September 2, to promote Preston Tucker.

=== Detroit Tigers ===
On September 6, 2018, the Detroit Tigers claimed Peterson off of waivers. Peterson was immediately optioned to the Tigers' minor league affiliate, the Toledo Mud Hens.

Peterson hit .227/.277/.318 with 6 RBI in 17 games for Detroit in 2019. Peterson was outrighted off the Tigers roster on October 23, 2019. He became a minor league free agent on November 4.

=== Los Angeles Angels ===
On March 9, 2020, Peterson signed a minor league deal with the Los Angeles Angels organization. He was released by the team on May 29.

=== Sugar Land Skeeters ===
In July 2020, Peterson signed on to play for the Sugar Land Skeeters of the Constellation Energy League—a makeshift four-team independent league created as a result of the COVID-19 pandemic—for the 2020 season. He recorded a .309/.400/.500 slash line and was named team MVP.

=== Milwaukee Brewers ===
On December 15, 2020, Peterson signed a minor league contract with the Milwaukee Brewers organization. He spent the 2021 season with the Triple-A Nashville Sounds, playing in 77 games and hitting .272/.347/.416 with 9 home runs and 56 RBI. He began the 2022 season with Nashville, going 1-for-11 with four walks in three games for the team.

=== Philadelphia Phillies ===
On April 19, 2022, Peterson was traded to the Philadelphia Phillies in exchange for cash considerations. Peterson was then assigned to the Phillies' Triple-A affiliate, the Lehigh Valley IronPigs. In 102 games with the IronPigs, Peterson batted .244/.318/.379 with 9 home runs, 47 RBI, and 6 stolen bases. He elected free agency following the season on November 10.

On January 25, 2023, Peterson re-signed with the Phillies organization on a minor league contract. In 85 games for Triple–A Lehigh Valley, he batted .244/.328/.488 with 19 home runs and 54 RBI. Peterson elected free agency after the season on November 6.

=== Pittsburgh Pirates ===
On February 28, 2024, Peterson signed a minor league contract with the Pittsburgh Pirates. In 54 games split between the Double–A Altoona Curve and Triple–A Indianapolis Indians, he slashed a combined .212/.288/.323 with five home runs, 26 RBI, and four stolen bases. Peterson was released by the Pirates organization on August 4.

=== Cleburne Railroaders ===
On January 27, 2025, Peterson signed with the Cleburne Railroaders of the American Association of Professional Baseball. However, he was released prior to the start of the season on March 6. On April 26, Peterson re-signed with Cleburne. In 78 appearances for the Railroaders, he hit .299/.389/.495 with 14 home runs and 54 RBI. He became a free agent following the season.

== Personal life ==
Peterson's older brother, D. J., is also a professional baseball player.
