= Iván Castillo (baseball) =

Dominican baseball player (born 1995)

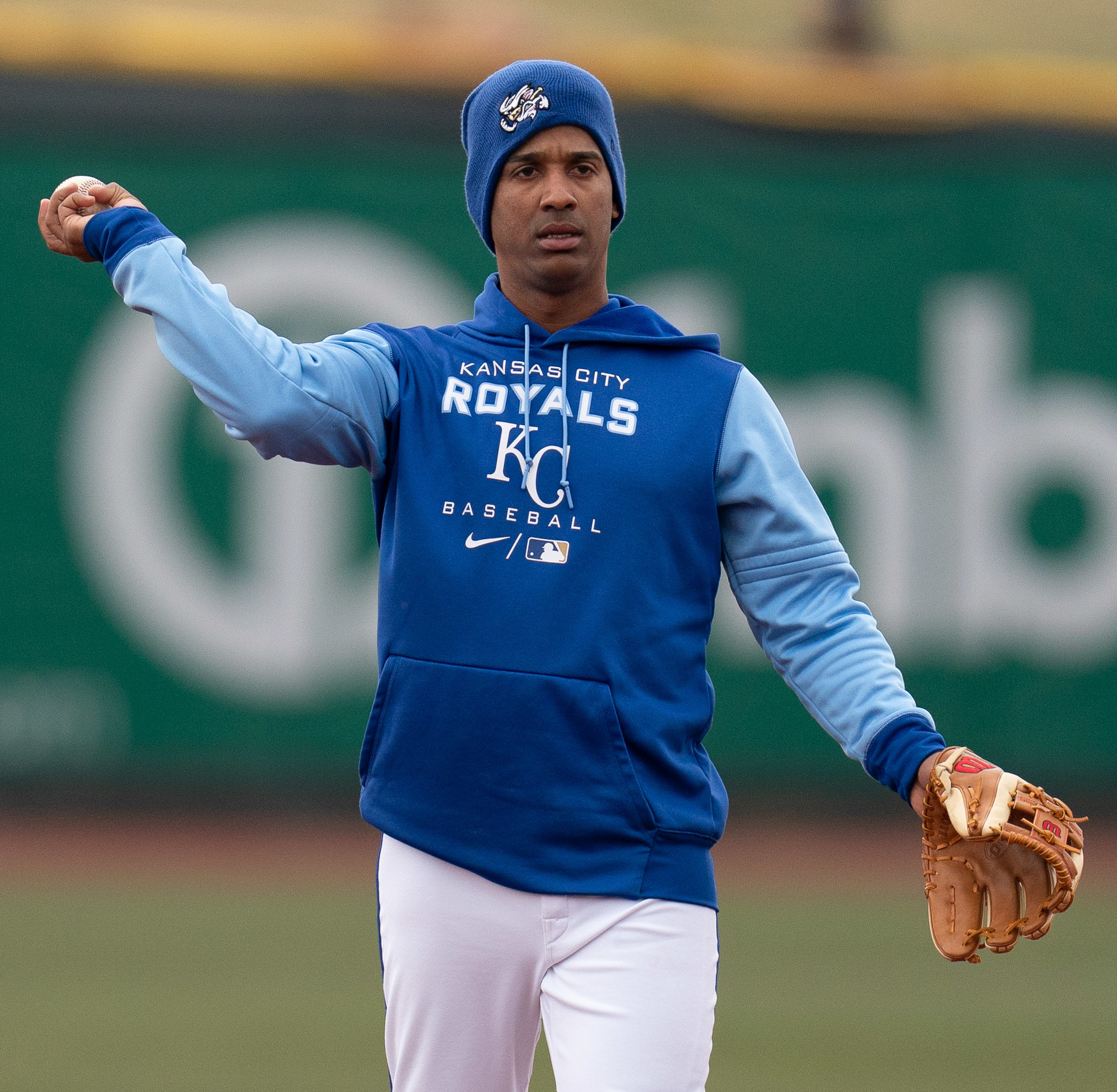
- Castillo at Werner Park in 2022

Leones del Escogido
- Infielder
- Born: May 30, 1995 (age 31); Santiago, Dominican Republic
- Bats: Both Throws: Right

MLB debut
- May 14, 2021, for the San Diego Padres

MLB statistics (through 2021 season)
- Batting average: .333
- Home runs: 0
- Runs batted in: 1
- Stats at Baseball Reference

Teams
- San Diego Padres (2021)

Iván Enrique Castillo (born May 30, 1995) is a Dominican professional baseball infielder for the Saraperos de Saltillo of the Mexican League. He has previously played in Major League Baseball (MLB) for the San Diego Padres. He signed with the Cleveland Indians as an international free agent in 2012.

== Professional career ==
=== Cleveland Indians ===
On May 31, 2012, Castillo signed with the Cleveland Indians as an international free agent. He made his professional debut for the Dominican Summer League Indians. In 2013, Castillo played for the rookie-level Arizona League Indians, batting .231/.258/.269 in 42 contests. He spent the 2014 season in Single-A with the Lake County Captains, slashing .260/.293/.365 with five home runs and 26 RBI. He played for the High-A Lynchburg Hillcats in 2015, hitting .249/.305/.347 with 20 stolen bases in 120 games. He split the 2016 season between Lynchburg, the Double-A Akron RubberDucks, and the Triple-A Columbus Clippers, accumulating a .192/.233/.268 batting line between the three clubs. In 2017, Castillo split the season between Akron and Lynchburg, batting .267/.341/.354 with one home run and 14 RBI in 56 games.

=== Toronto Blue Jays ===
On December 14, 2017, Castillo was selected in the minor league phase of the Rule 5 draft by the Toronto Blue Jays. He spent the 2018 season in High-A with the Dunedin Blue Jays, batting .304/.345/.448 with five home runs and 44 RBI in 108 games. On November 2, 2018, Castillo elected free agency.

=== San Diego Padres ===
On November 9, 2018, Castillo signed a minor league contract with the San Diego Padres organization. He began the 2019 season on the injured list due to a broken arm that he suffered in spring training and was assigned to the Double-A Amarillo Sod Poodles. In 2019, he hit a career-best .313/.347/.461 with career-highs in home runs (8) and RBI (57) in 104 games for Amarillo.

Castillo was invited to spring training for the Padres in 2020, but did not make the club. He did not play in a game in 2020 due to the cancellation of the minor league season because of the COVID-19 pandemic. Castillo was assigned to the Triple-A El Paso Chihuahuas to begin the 2021 season, and hit .444/.516/.519 with two stolen bases in his first seven games with the club.

On May 14, 2021, Castillo was selected to the 40-man roster and promoted to the major leagues for the first time. He made his MLB debut that day, replacing Tucupita Marcano at second base and going hitless in two at-bats. Castillo appeared in three games for the Padres—singling in a run two days later in his only other plate appearance—before being sent back down to Triple-A El Paso, where he hit .287/.326/.366 in 113 games. On October 30, Castillo was outrighted off of the 40-man roster; he elected free agency on November 7.

=== Kansas City Royals ===
On December 9, 2021, Castillo signed a minor league contract with the Kansas City Royals. He spent the 2022 season with the Triple-A Omaha Storm Chasers, playing in 113 games and hitting .242/.322/.347 with six home runs, 37 RBI, and nine stolen bases. Castillo elected free agency following the season on November 10.

=== Los Angeles Dodgers ===
On January 30, 2023, Castillo signed a minor league contract with the Los Angeles Dodgers organization. He was released by Los Angeles on April 14.

=== Acereros de Monclova ===
On June 20, 2023, Castillo signed with the Acereros de Monclova of the Mexican League. In eight games, he batted .200/.261/.350 with four hits and three RBI. Castillo was waived on July 3.

=== Long Island Ducks ===
On February 13, 2024, Castillo signed with the Long Island Ducks of the Atlantic League of Professional Baseball. In 74 games for the Ducks, he batted .297/.349/.447 with 11 home runs, 48 RBI, and 16 stolen bases. Castillo became a free agent following the season.

On June 27, 2025, Castillo re-signed with Long Island. In 59 games with Long Island, he slashed .341/.401/.466 with four home runs, 36 RBI, and 13 stolen bases. Castillo became a free agent following the season.

On January 28, 2026, Castillo signed with the Olmecas de Tabasco of the Mexican League. However, on April 10, Castillo was released by the Olmecas.

=== Saraperos de Saltillo ===
On June 21, 2026, Castillo signed with the Saraperos de Saltillo of the Mexican League.

== See also ==
- Rule 5 draft results
