= Jace Peterson =

American baseball player (born 1990)

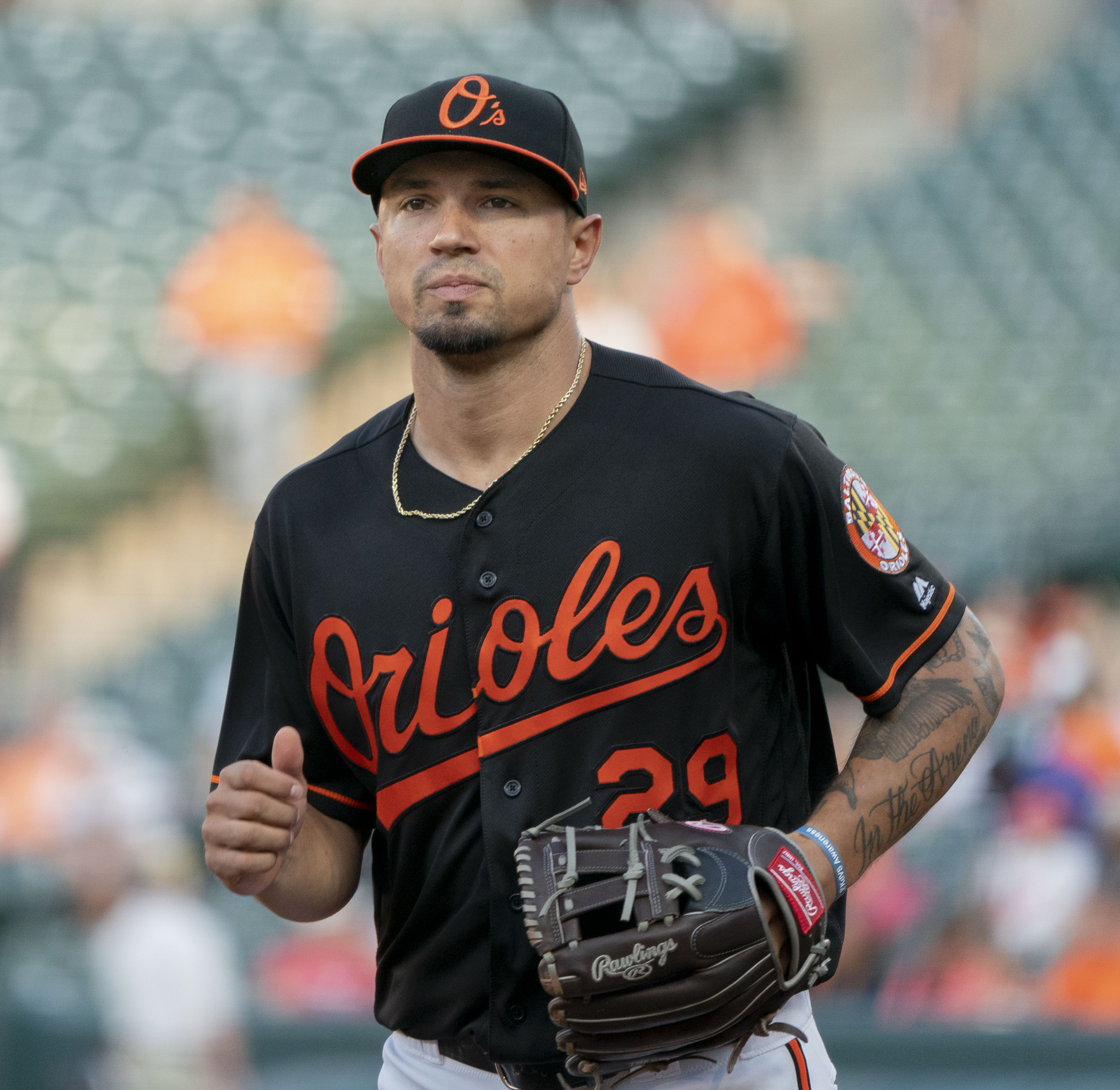
- Peterson with the Baltimore Orioles in 2018
- Utility player
- Born: May 9, 1990 (age 36); Lake Charles, Louisiana, U.S.
- Batted: Left Threw: Right

MLB debut
- April 25, 2014, for the San Diego Padres

Last MLB appearance
- April 18, 2024, for the Arizona Diamondbacks

MLB statistics
- Batting average: .226
- Home runs: 42
- Runs batted in: 245
- Stats at Baseball Reference

Teams
- San Diego Padres (2014); Atlanta Braves (2015–2017); New York Yankees (2018); Baltimore Orioles (2018–2019); Milwaukee Brewers (2020–2022); Oakland Athletics (2023); Arizona Diamondbacks (2023–2024)

Jace Ryan Peterson (born May 9, 1990) is an American former professional baseball utility player. He played in Major League Baseball (MLB) for the San Diego Padres, Atlanta Braves, New York Yankees, Baltimore Orioles, Milwaukee Brewers, Oakland Athletics, and Arizona Diamondbacks. Peterson played college baseball at McNeese State University.

== Early life ==
Jace Peterson was born in Lake Charles, Louisiana on May 9, 1990, as the eldest of three children to Scott and Shawn Peterson. He was a three-sport athlete at Hamilton Christian Academy in his hometown, playing baseball, basketball, and football. Upon graduation, Peterson attended McNeese State University, where he played football and baseball for the McNeese State Cowboys. In his three-season collegiate baseball career, Peterson set a school record for stolen bases, with 78.

== Professional career ==
=== San Diego Padres ===
==== Minor leagues ====
Peterson was drafted by the Padres in the supplemental first round (58th pick overall) of the 2011 Major League Baseball draft and signed with the team for $624,600.

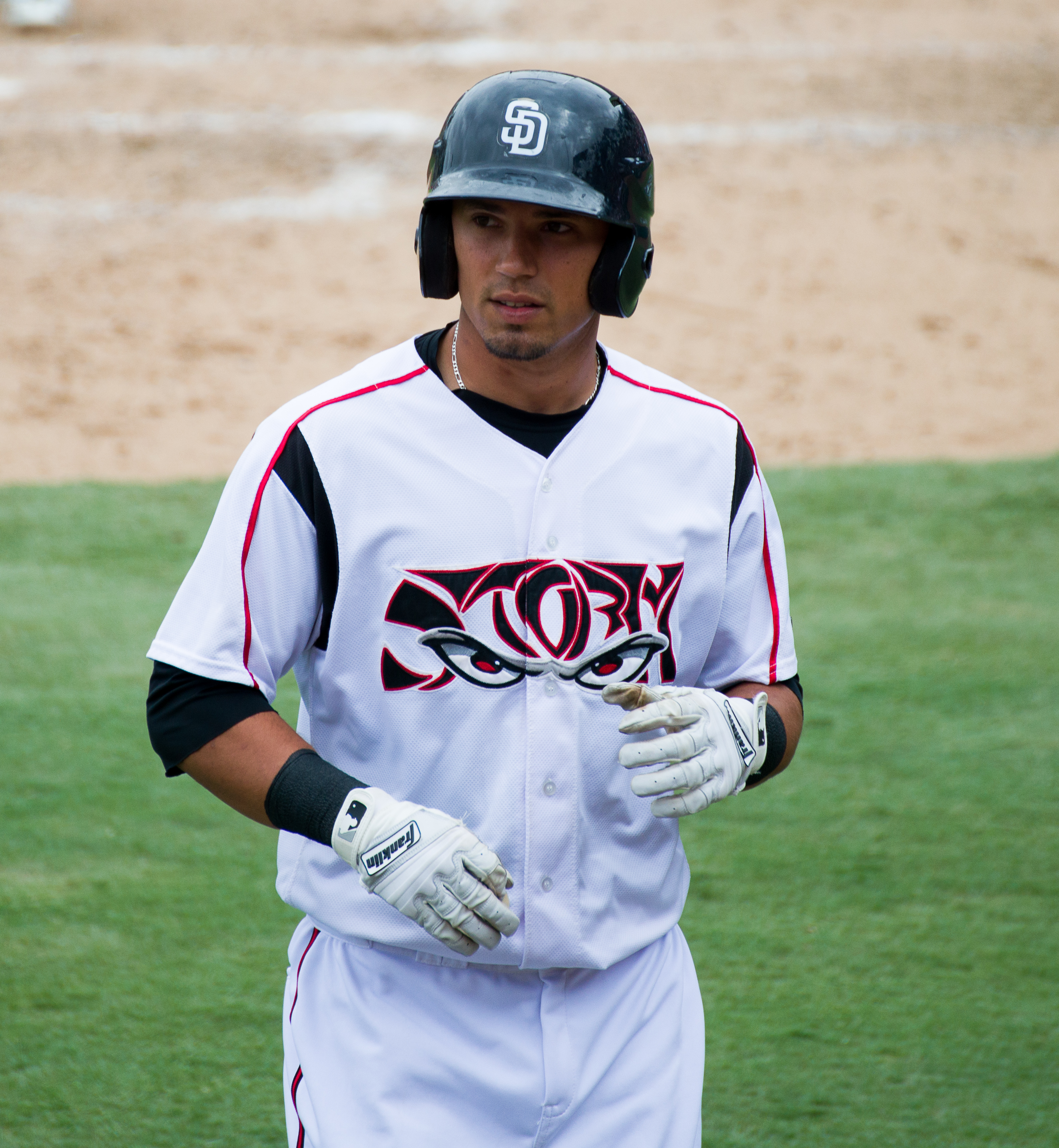
Peterson with the Lake Elsinore Storm in 2013

Peterson made his professional debut with the Eugene Emeralds in 2011. He played in 73 games, hitting .243/360/.333 with two home runs over 276 at-bats. In 2012, he played for the Fort Wayne TinCaps, hitting .286/.378/.392 in 444 at-bats over 117 games. He played the 2013 season with the Lake Elsinore Storm and hit .303/.382/.454 with seven home runs in 496 at-bats over 113 games. He started the 2014 season with the Double-A San Antonio Missions. After appearing with the Major League club, he was optioned to the Triple-A El Paso Chihuahuas in May. While he had primarily played shortstop in his previous minor league assignments, he saw time at second, third, and short with El Paso. In 2014, he hit .306/.406/.464 with two home runs in 248 at-bats over 68 games at Triple-A after batting .311 in 18 games at Double-A.

==== Major leagues ====
Peterson was called up to the Majors for the first time from Double-A on April 25, 2014, when Chase Headley strained his calf. He made seven starts at third base before being optioned to Triple-A. He was recalled on June 4 and took over at second base when Jedd Gyorko was placed on the disabled list with plantar fasciitis on June 6. Peterson made ten starts at second before the Padres claimed Irving Falú off waivers and returned Peterson to Triple-A. He had two other brief stints with the Padres in 2014, but was not part of the September roster expansion. For the season, he went 6 for 53 at the plate, batting .113/.161/.113 in 53 at bats without any home runs or RBIs.

Peterson was one of seven Padres selected to play in the Arizona Fall League, where Bud Black expressed a desire for Peterson to get some experience in the outfield.

=== Atlanta Braves ===
On December 19, 2014, the Padres traded Peterson, Max Fried, Dustin Peterson, and Mallex Smith to the Atlanta Braves in exchange for Justin Upton and Aaron Northcraft. Peterson was invited to spring training and made Braves' Opening Day roster. On May 16, 2015, Peterson came to bat in the top of the second inning against the Miami Marlins with the bases loaded, and hit his first career home run, a grand slam, off Marlins pitcher Mat Latos. The Braves went on to win, 5–3. Peterson ended the season with a .239 batting average, .314 on base percentage, and .335 slugging percentage in 528 at bats, and was second in the NL with nine errors at second base.

He was again named the Braves' primary second baseman at the start of the 2016 season, but struggled through April and lost playing time before being optioned to the Gwinnett Braves on May 2. On June 10, Peterson was recalled to the majors, after the trade of Kelly Johnson. Once he returned, Peterson improved his hitting and became a utility player, mainly sharing time at second base with Gordon Beckham. He remained a utility player through the end of 2016. He was also a utility player in 2017, in which he batted .215/.318/.317 with 2 home runs in 186 at bats.

=== New York Yankees ===
On January 5, 2018, Peterson signed a minor league contract with the New York Yankees that included an invitation to spring training. He was promoted to the major leagues on April 7, and played three games with the Yankees before returning to the minors on April 13, where he refused assignment and became a free agent. He re-signed with the Yankees on April 16 and ultimately was designated for assignment again on April 22.

=== Baltimore Orioles ===
Peterson was claimed off waivers by the Baltimore Orioles on April 24, 2018. In his first game with the team, Peterson hit a double and collected two RBI in three at-bats. He ended the season playing in 93 games for Baltimore, hitting .195/.308/.325 with three home runs and 28 RBI in 200 at-bats. Peterson was removed from the 40-man roster and sent outright to the Triple-A Norfolk Tides on November 1, and subsequently elected free agency.

On November 20, 2018, Peterson re-signed with the Orioles organization on a minor league contract. He was released by the organization on July 16, 2019, but re-signed with Baltimore on a new minor league contract on July 19. On July 25, the Orioles selected Peterson's contract, adding him to their active roster. On September 3, Peterson was designated for assignment. He ended his season hitting .220/.269/.330 in 100 at-bats in 29 games with two home runs, playing primarily left field. He elected free agency on October 1.

=== Milwaukee Brewers ===
On December 17, 2019, Peterson signed a minor league contract with the Milwaukee Brewers. On August 22, 2020, Peterson had his contract selected to the active roster to replace Brock Holt, who was designated for assignment. On December 2, Peterson was non-tendered by the Brewers, and became a free agent.

On January 13, 2021, Peterson re-signed with the Brewers on a minor league contract. On April 10, Peterson was selected to the active roster after Kolten Wong was placed on the injured list. He notched 5 hits in 24 at-bats before being placed on the injured list on April 23 with left thumb cryotherapy. On May 24, he was reinstated from the injured list and designated for assignment. He was outrighted to the Triple-A Nashville Sounds on May 26. On June 8, Peterson was re-selected to the active roster. In 2022 in the majors he batted .236/.316/.382 in 288 at bats, playing primarily third base.

On November 30, the Brewers signed Peterson to a contract for the 2022 season.

=== Oakland Athletics ===
On December 13, 2022, Peterson signed a two-year contract with the Oakland Athletics. In a June 6, 2023, game against the Pittsburgh Pirates, Peterson went 5–for–5 with two home runs and five RBI, marking the first multi–homer performance of his career. In addition, he became the first Athletics player to have five hits, five RBI, and multiple home runs in a game since Reggie Jackson in 1969.

=== Arizona Diamondbacks ===
On July 31, 2023, the Athletics traded Peterson to the Arizona Diamondbacks in exchange for Chad Patrick. In 41 games for Arizona, he batted .183/.276/.258 with nine RBI and four stolen bases.

In 2024, Peterson played in 14 games for the Diamondbacks, mustering an .045/.154/.045 slash with no home runs and one RBI. On April 19, 2024, Peterson was designated for assignment by the team. He was released three days later.

== Coaching career ==
On March 12, 2025, the Milwaukee Brewers announced that they had hired Peterson as a consultant to the organization's player development and high performance staff.

== Personal life ==
Peterson and wife Brianna Pugh, who played soccer for the University of Oregon, have a daughter, born in 2016. They live in Lake Charles, Louisiana. His sister-in-law, Mallory Swanson, an Olympic Gold Medalist, is married to Dansby Swanson, his former Braves teammate.
