= Daniel Camarena =

American baseball player (born 1992)

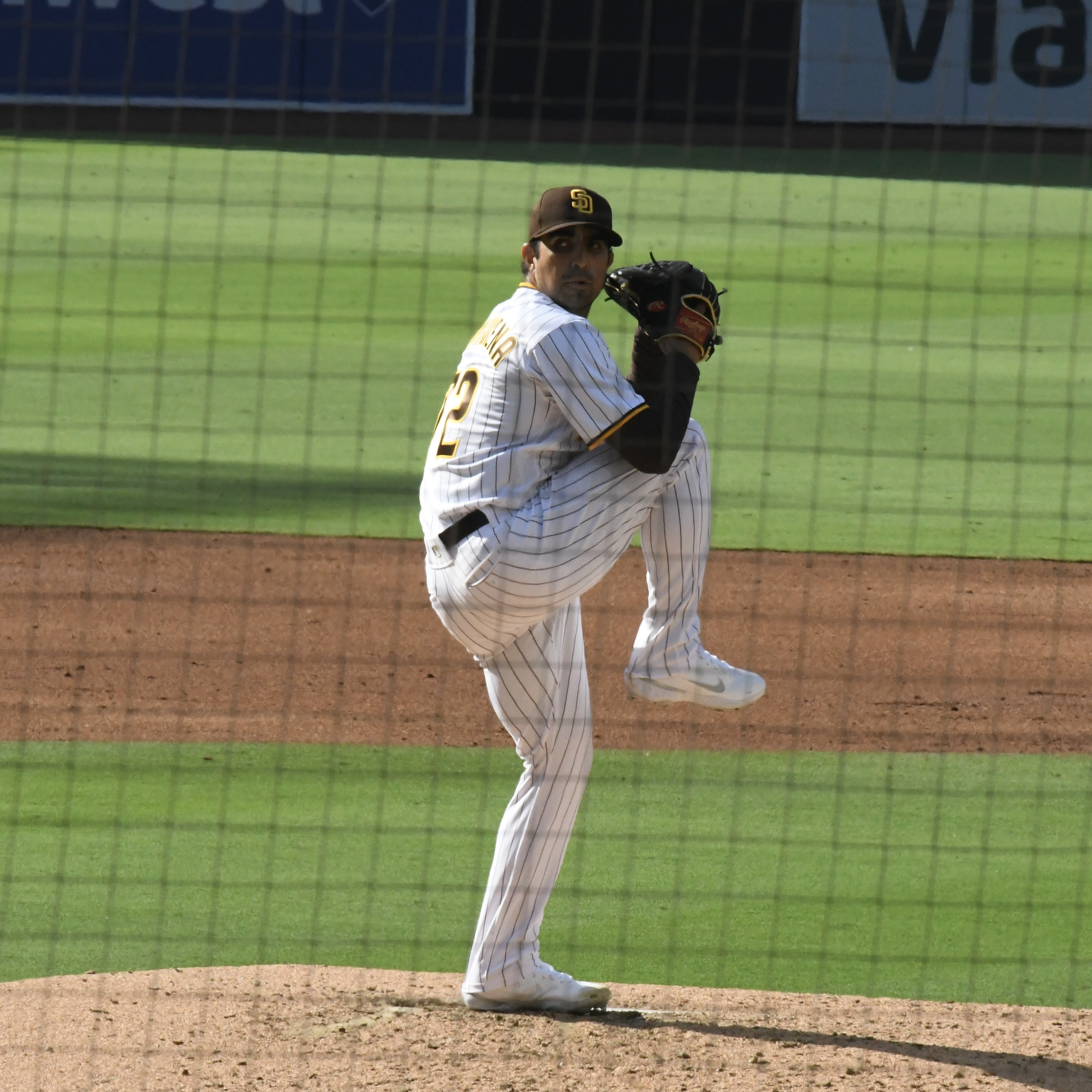
- Camarena pitching for the San Diego Padres in 2021

Olmecas de Tabasco – No. 43
- Pitcher
- Born: November 9, 1992 (age 33); Bonita, California, U.S.
- Bats: Left Throws: Left

MLB debut
- June 19, 2021, for the San Diego Padres

MLB statistics (through 2021 season)
- Win–loss record: 0–1
- Earned run average: 9.64
- Strikeouts: 7
- Stats at Baseball Reference

Teams
- San Diego Padres (2021)

Daniel Ricardo Camarena (born November 9, 1992) is an American professional baseball pitcher for the Olmecas de Tabasco of the Mexican League. He has previously played in Major League Baseball (MLB) for the San Diego Padres. He was drafted by the New York Yankees in the 20th round of the 2011 MLB draft. Listed at 6 feet 0 inches (1.83 m) and 210 pounds (95 kg), he throws and bats left-handed.

Camarena spent a day on the Yankees' active roster in 2019, but did not appear in a game, earning him the distinction of being a "phantom ballplayer". He remained a phantom ballplayer until he eventually made his MLB debut with the Padres in 2021. On July 8, 2021, he became the first relief pitcher to hit a grand slam since 1985, and the first pitcher since 1898 to do so on his first hit.

== Playing career ==
=== New York Yankees ===
Camarena was drafted by the New York Yankees in the 20th round, 629th overall, of the 2011 Major League Baseball draft out of Cathedral Catholic High School. On August 16, 2011, Camarena signed with the Yankees over slot value, signing for $335K. He made his professional debut in 2012 with the rookie-level Gulf Coast League Yankees. In 2013, Camarena spent the year with the Single-A Charleston RiverDogs. In 25 appearances (21 starts) for the team, he compiled a 4-6 record and 4.42 ERA with 83 strikeouts over 112 innings of work.

Camarena split the 2014 campaign between the High-A Tampa Yankees and Double-A Trenton Thunder. In 26 starts for the two affiliates, he posted an aggregate 7-11 record and 3.40 ERA with 112 strikeouts across 143 innings pitched. Camarena missed the 2015 season after undergoing Tommy John surgery. He returned to action in 2016 with Tampa, Trenton, and the Triple-A Scranton/Wilkes-Barre RailRiders. In 29 appearances (22 starts) split between the three affiliates, Camarena logged a combined 10-7 record and 3.68 ERA with 114 strikeouts across 141 2/3 innings pitched.

Camarena spent the 2017 season with Double–A Trenton and Triple–A Scranton/Wilkes-Barre. In 22 starts between the two affiliates, he logged a 6–6 record and 3.65 ERA with 78 strikeouts across 118 1/3 innings pitched. Camarena elected free agency following the season on November 6, 2017.

On January 8, 2018, Camarena signed a minor league contract with the Chicago Cubs. On April 2, he was traded back to the Yankees organization in exchange for future considerations. After posting a 5.08 ERA in 8 starts for Triple–A Scranton, Camarena was released on May 20.

=== San Francisco Giants ===
On May 24, 2018, Camarena signed a minor league contract with the San Francisco Giants. He spent the remainder of the season with the Triple–A Sacramento River Cats, also appearing in one game for the Double–A Richmond Flying Squirrels. In 16 games (15 starts) for Sacramento, Camarena registered a 1–8 record and 5.65 ERA with 64 strikeouts across 79 2/3 innings pitched. He elected free agency following the season on November 2.

=== Minnesota Twins ===
On January 19, 2019, Camarena signed a minor league contract with the Minnesota Twins. He made one appearances for the Triple–A Rochester Red Wings, allowing three runs on five hits with six strikeouts in 4 1/3 innings pitched. Camarena was released by the Twins organization on April 29.

=== New York Yankees (second stint) ===
On May 8, 2019, Camarena signed a minor league contract to return to the New York Yankees organization. On July 6, Camarena was selected to the 40-man roster and promoted to the major leagues for the first time. However, he was optioned to Triple-A the next day without appearing in a game, becoming a phantom ballplayer. In 17 games (16 starts) for Scranton, Camarena struggled to a 4–8 record and 6.27 ERA with 88 strikeouts across 99 innings of work. On August 13, he was released by the Yankees organization.

=== San Diego Padres ===
On February 13, 2020, Camarena signed a minor league contract with the San Diego Padres organization. He did not play in a game in 2020 due to the cancellation of the minor league season because of the COVID-19 pandemic.

On July 19, 2020, Camarena was added to the Padres’ 60-man player pool for the pandemic-shortened season but spent the year at the alternate training site without making an MLB appearance. He was assigned to the Triple-A El Paso Chihuahuas to begin the 2021 season.

Camerena was named the Triple-A West pitcher of the week for the week of June 7–13, 2021. On June 18, the Padres' added Camarena to their taxi squad. The next day, he was selected to the active roster. He made his MLB debut that day against the Cincinnati Reds, pitching 2 2/3 innings and allowing 3 earned runs. In the game, he also notched his first career strikeout, punching out Reds infielder Mike Freeman.

On July 8, 2021, Camarena hit a grand slam off Washington Nationals pitcher Max Scherzer, sparking a comeback from an 8–0 deficit which resulted in a 9–8 victory for the Padres. This made Camarena the first MLB relief pitcher to hit a grand slam since Don Robinson in 1985, and the first pitcher to hit a grand slam for his first career hit since Bill Duggleby of the Philadelphia Phillies in 1898, and the second Padres pitcher since Mike Corkins who hit one off the Reds in 1970. Camarena would appear in 6 major league games for San Diego, posting a 9.64 ERA with 7 strikeouts. On October 30, Camarena was outrighted off of the 40-man roster and elected free agency on November 7.

On January 26, 2022, Camarena re-signed with the Padres on a minor league contract. On April 7, Camarena was released by the Padres. Camarena re-signed with the Padres organization on a new minor league contract on April 14 before he was placed on the 60-day injured list on April 19 after undergoing Tommy John surgery He became a free agent following the season on November 6.

On December 29, 2023, Camarena re-signed with the Padres on a minor league contract. He split the 2024 campaign between the rookie-level Arizona Complex League Padres, Single-A Lake Elsinore Storm, High-A Fort Wayne TinCaps, San Antonio, and El Paso. In 32 appearances (9 starts) for the five affiliates, Camarena struggled to a combined 1-9 record and 7.74 ERA with 42 strikeouts across 59 1/3 innings pitched. He elected free agency following the season on November 4, 2024.

=== Tecolotes de los Dos Laredos ===
On June 1, 2025, Camarena came out of retirement to sign with the Tecolotes de los Dos Laredos of the Mexican League. In five appearances (four starts) for Dos Laredos, he struggled to an 0-2 record and 9.45 ERA with nine strikeouts across 13 1/3 innings pitched. Camarena was released by the Tecolotes on July 5.

=== Diablos Rojos del México ===
On July 9, 2025, Camarena signed with the Diablos Rojos del México of the Mexican League. He made three appearances (two starts) for the Diablos, posting an 0-1 record and 7.71 ERA with eight strikeouts across 9 1/3 innings pitched. Camarena was released by México on July 29.

=== Caliente de Durango ===
On May 20, 2026, Camarena was signed by the Caliente de Durango of the Mexican League. In 21 appearances for the Caliente, he posted a 1–1 record with a 4.82 ERA and 22 strikeouts across 18 2/3 innings pitched. On July 17, Camarena was released by Durango.

=== Olmecas de Tabasco ===
On July 17, 2026, Camarena signed with the Olmecas de Tabasco of the Mexican League.

== Coaching career ==
On January 17, 2025, Camarena was hired by the San Diego Padres to serve as a pitching coach for their rookie-level affiliate, the Arizona Complex League Padres.
