= Aaron Northcraft =

American baseball player (born 1990)

- Pitcher
- Born: May 28, 1990 (age 36); Tucson, Arizona, U.S.
- Batted: Right Threw: Right

MLB debut
- April 24, 2021, for the San Diego Padres

Last MLB appearance
- May 29, 2021, for the San Diego Padres

MLB statistics
- Win–loss record: 1-0
- Earned run average: 2.25
- Strikeouts: 5
- Stats at Baseball Reference

Teams
- San Diego Padres (2021)

Aaron Lee Northcraft (born May 28, 1990) is an American former professional baseball pitcher. After spending time on the Atlanta Braves’ 40-man roster in 2013 and 2014, Northcraft made his Major League Baseball (MLB) debut in 2021 for the San Diego Padres.

== Career ==
=== Atlanta Braves ===
Northcraft was drafted in the 10th round, of the 2009 Major League Baseball draft, 298th overall by the Atlanta Braves out of Mater Dei High School. He made his professional debut in 2009 with the Gulf Coast League Braves. He split the 2010 season between the rookie–level Danville Braves and the Single–A Rome Braves, recording a cumulative 3.90 ERA and 7–4 record with 46 strikeouts. The next year, Northcraft spent the season in Rome, registering a 7–8 record and 3.34 ERA with 88 strikeouts in 113 1/3 innings pitched. He spent the 2012 season with the High-A Lynchburg Hillcats, pitching to a 10–11 record and 3.98 ERA in 151 2/3 innings of work. On November 19, 2012, Northcraft was selected to the 40-man roster in order to be protected from the Rule 5 draft. In 2013, Northcraft spent the season with the Double–A Mississippi Braves, registering a 8–8 record and 3.42 ERA. The next year, he split the year with Mississippi and the Triple–A Gwinnett Braves, pitching to a 7–10 record and 4.70 ERA.

=== San Diego Padres ===
On December 19, 2014, Northcraft was traded to the San Diego Padres along with Justin Upton in exchange for Jace Peterson, Max Fried, Dustin Peterson, and Mallex Smith. On February 11, 2015, Northcraft was designated for assignment by the Padres following the signing of James Shields. On February 17, Northcraft was outrighted to the Triple-A El Paso Chihuahuas. He split the season between El Paso and the Double-A San Antonio Missions, recording a 4–6 record and 4.21 ERA in 39 games. He split 2016 between El Paso and San Antonio, pitching to a 7–3 record and 4.07 ERA in 90 2/3 innings of work. Northcraft elected free agency following the season on November 7, 2016.

Northcraft spent the 2017 and 2018 seasons out of baseball due to injuries, missing 2017 with a partially torn flexor and UCL and missing 2018 after undergoing a January surgery to repair nerve damage in his right elbow. He appeared in 17 games for the Tigres de Aragua in the Venezuelan Winter League for the 2018/2019 season, pitching to a 1.53 ERA in 17.2 innings pitched.

=== Seattle Mariners ===
On January 2, 2019, Northcraft signed a minor league contract with the Seattle Mariners organization. He spent the majority of the season with the Triple-A Tacoma Rainiers, also appearing in 1 game for the Low-A Everett AquaSox and 3 games for the Double-A Arkansas Travelers, recording a cumulative 2.03 ERA with 39 strikeouts between the three clubs. Northcraft elected free agency following the season on November 4.

=== Miami Marlins ===
On December 18, 2019, Northcraft signed a minor league contract with the Miami Marlins organization that included an invitation to Spring Training. Northcraft was included in the Marlins' initial 60–man player pool for the 2020 season, but did not play in a game for the organization due to the cancellation of the minor league season because of the COVID-19 pandemic. He elected free agency on November 2, 2020.

=== San Diego Padres (second stint) ===
On February 12, 2021, Northcraft signed a minor league contract with the San Diego Padres organization that included an invitation to Spring Training. He was assigned to the Triple-A El Paso Chihuahuas to begin the year. On April 23, Northcraft was selected to the 40–man roster and promoted to the major leagues for the first time. He made his MLB debut the next day, pitching in relief against the Los Angeles Dodgers. In the game, he also notched his first major league strikeout, punching out Dodgers outfielder Luke Raley. Northcraft recorded a 2.25 ERA in five appearances, walking eight and striking out five before being designated for assignment on July 9. He was released on July 13, and re–signed a minor league contract on July 19.

Northcraft spent the entirety of the 2022 campaign with Triple–A El Paso. In 30 appearances out of the bullpen, he compiled a 3.16 ERA with 20 strikeouts across 31 1/3 innings pitched. Northcraft was released by the Padres organization on August 10, 2022.
