= Brian O'Grady =

American baseball player (born 1992)

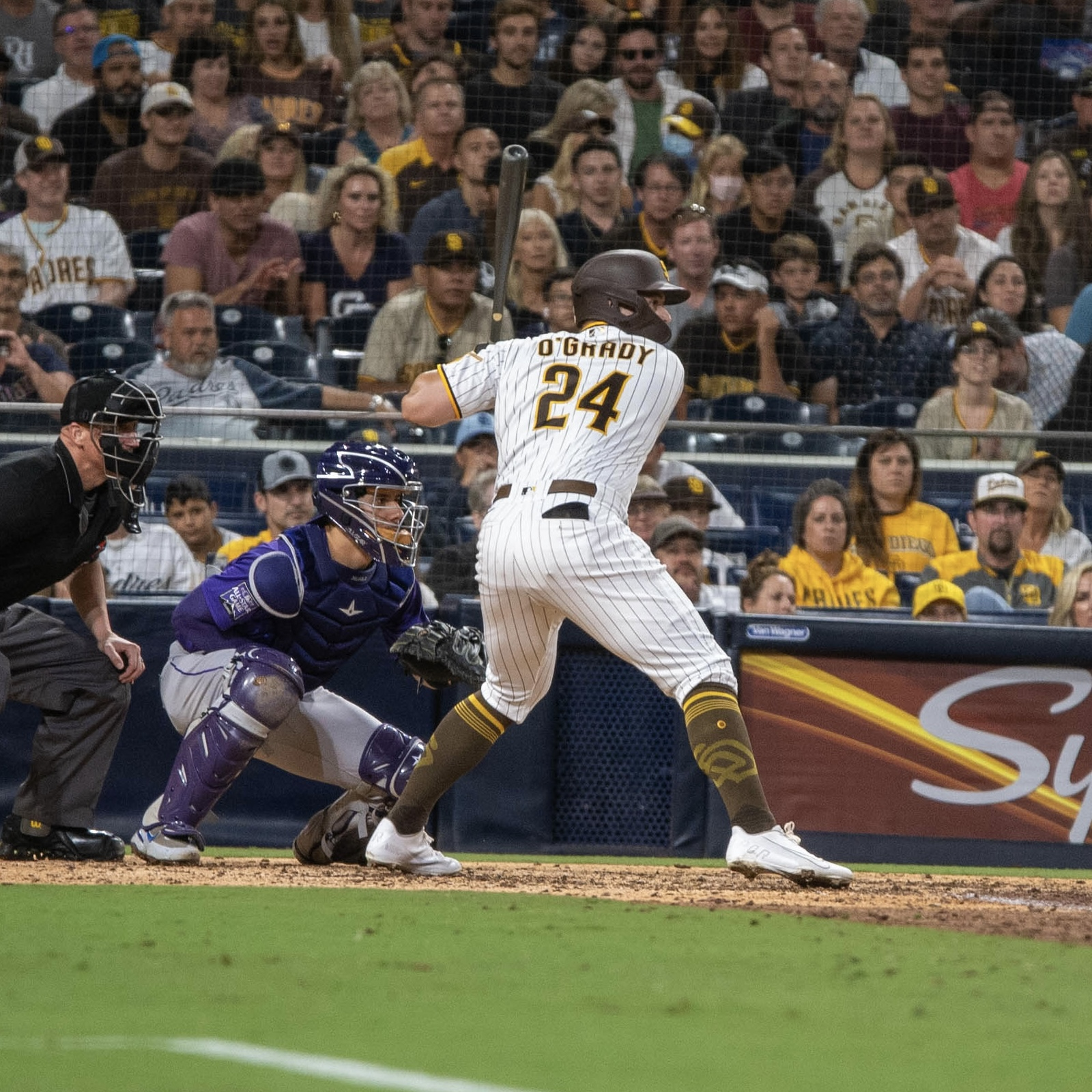
- O'Grady with the Padres in 2021
- Center fielder / First baseman
- Born: May 17, 1992 (age 34); Philadelphia, Pennsylvania, U.S.
- Batted: Left Threw: Right

Professional debut
- MLB: August 8, 2019, for the Cincinnati Reds
- NPB: March 25, 2022, for the Saitama Seibu Lions
- KBO: April 1, 2023, for the Hanwha Eagles

Last appearance
- MLB: August 13, 2021, for the San Diego Padres
- NPB: October 2, 2022, for the Saitama Seibu Lions
- KBO: May 18, 2023, for the Hanwha Eagles

MLB statistics
- Batting average: .184
- Home runs: 4
- Runs batted in: 12

NPB statistics
- Batting average: .213
- Home runs: 15
- Runs batted in: 46

KBO statistics
- Batting average: .125
- Home runs: 0
- Runs batted in: 8
- Stats at Baseball Reference

Teams
- Cincinnati Reds (2019); Tampa Bay Rays (2020); San Diego Padres (2021); Saitama Seibu Lions (2022); Hanwha Eagles (2023)

Brian O'Grady (born May 17, 1992) is an American former professional baseball center fielder and first baseman. He played in Major League Baseball (MLB) for the Cincinnati Reds, Tampa Bay Rays, and San Diego Padres, in Nippon Professional Baseball (NPB) for the Saitama Seibu Lions, and in the KBO League for the Hanwha Eagles.

== Career ==
O'Grady attended Archbishop Wood Catholic High School in Warminster Township, Pennsylvania. He attended Rutgers University and played college baseball for the Scarlet Knights. O'Grady was drafted by the Cincinnati Reds in the eighth round, with the 245th overall selection, of the 2014 Major League Baseball draft.

=== Cincinnati Reds ===
O'Grady played for the Billings Mustangs in 2014, hitting .257.354/.449 with 6 home runs and 42 RBI. He split the 2015 season between the Dayton Dragons and the Daytona Tortugas, hitting a combined .249/.360/.411 with 11 home runs and 54 RBI. He returned to Daytona for the 2016 season, hitting .235/.363/.394 with 9 home runs and 40 RBI. He split the 2017 season between Daytona and the Pensacola Blue Wahoos, hitting a combined .185/.313/.347 with 8 home runs and 27 RBI. He split the 2018 season between Pensacola and the Louisville Bats, hitting a combined .280/.358/.512 with 14 home runs and 59 RBI. He returned to Louisville to open the 2019 season.

On August 5, 2019, the Reds selected O'Grady's contract and promoted him to the major leagues. He made his debut on August 8 versus the Chicago Cubs. O'Grady was designated for assignment on November 25, 2019.

=== Tampa Bay Rays ===
On November 27, 2019, O'Grady was traded to the Tampa Bay Rays in exchange for cash considerations and a PTBNL. On August 29, 2020, O'Grady was recalled to the active roster. On November 20, 2020, O'Grady was designated for assignment.

=== San Diego Padres ===
On December 8, 2020, O'Grady signed a major league contract with the San Diego Padres. O'Grady played in 32 games for the Padres in 2021, hitting .157 with 2 home runs and 9 RBI's. On October 30, 2021, O'Grady was outrighted off of the 40-man roster. He became a free agent following the season.

=== Saitama Seibu Lions ===
On November 26, 2021, O'Grady signed with the Saitama Seibu Lions of Nippon Professional Baseball. He hit .213 with 15 home runs and 46 RBI over 123 games in 2022.

=== Hanwha Eagles ===
On December 20, 2022, O'Grady signed a one-year contract with the Hanwha Eagles of the KBO League. He played in 22 games for the Eagles in 2023, struggling to a .125/.174/.163 batting line with no home runs and eight RBI. On May 31, 2023, O'Grady was released by Hanwha.

=== Kansas City Monarchs ===
On June 27, 2023, O'Grady signed with the Kansas City Monarchs of the American Association of Professional Baseball. In 57 games for the Monarchs, O'Grady batted .242/.304/.449 with 12 home runs, 39 RBI, and 6 stolen bases.

=== Cleburne Railroaders ===
On April 2, 2024, O'Grady was traded to the Cleburne Railroaders of the American Association of Professional Baseball in exchange for cash and a player to be named later. In 96 games for Cleburne, he slashed .244/.366/.506 with 24 home runs, 78 RBI, and nine stolen bases. O'Grady was released by the Railroaders on March 12, 2025.

=== Gastonia Ghost Peppers ===
On June 3, 2025, O'Grady signed with the Gastonia Ghost Peppers of the Atlantic League of Professional Baseball. In 33 appearances for Gastonia, O'Grady batted .339/.439/.669 with 10 home runs, 25 RBI, and four stolen bases.

=== Algodoneros de Unión Laguna ===
On July 11, 2025, O'Grady signed with the Algodoneros de Unión Laguna of the Mexican League. He made 21 appearances for the team, hitting .301/.386/.603 with five home runs and 13 RBI.

O'Grady played in 18 games for Laguna in 2026, slashing .150/.239/.333 with two home runs and eight RBI. On May 11, 2026, O'Grady was waived by the Algodoneros.

On May 13, 2026, O'Grady was claimed off waivers by the Saraperos de Saltillo of the Mexican League. O'Grady did not appear for Saltillo following the move, and announced his retirement from professional baseball on June 14.
