= Reiss Knehr =

American baseball player (born 1996)

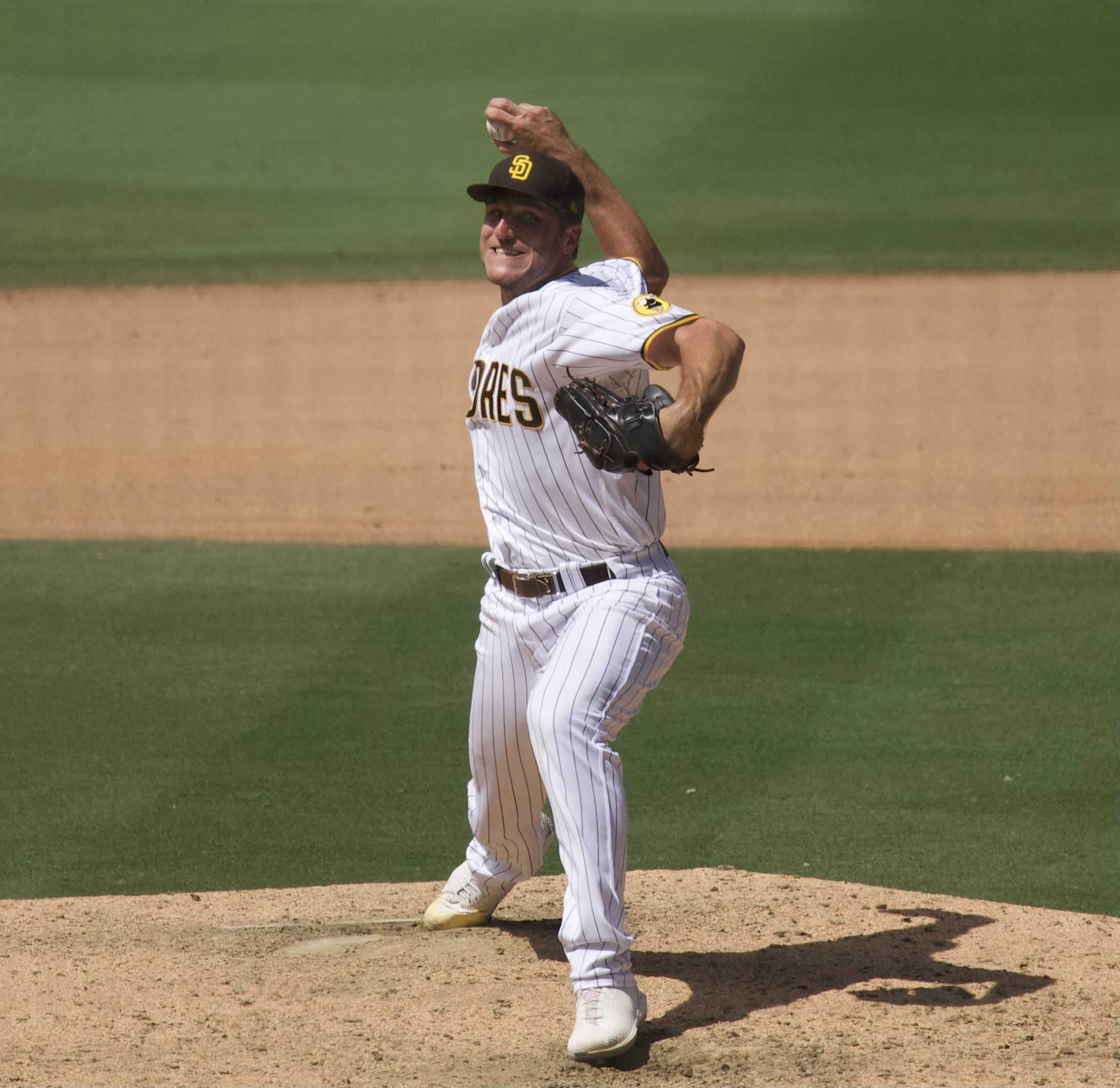
- Knehr pitching for the San Diego Padres in 2021

Free agent
- Pitcher
- Born: November 3, 1996 (age 30); Manhasset, New York, U.S.
- Bats: Left Throws: Right

MLB debut
- July 9, 2021, for the San Diego Padres

MLB statistics (through 2023 season)
- Win–loss record: 1–3
- Earned run average: 5.96
- Strikeouts: 34
- Stats at Baseball Reference

Teams
- San Diego Padres (2021–2023)

David Reiss Knehr (/ˈriːs kəˈniːr/ REESS kə-NEER; born November 3, 1996) is an American professional baseball pitcher who is a free agent. He has previously played in Major League Baseball (MLB) for the San Diego Padres.

== Amateur career ==
Knehr was born in Manhasset, New York and grew up in Glen Head, New York. He attended St. Dominic High School in Oyster Bay, New York.

Knehr played college baseball at Fordham University for three seasons, playing both as pitcher and as a shortstop. He was named to the Atlantic 10 Conference All-Rookie Team after leading the Rams with a 2.25 ERA with 37 strikeouts in 36 innings pitched. Following his freshman year, Knehr pitched for the Westhampton Aviators of the Hamptons Collegiate Baseball League and was named the league's Pitcher of the Year. As a junior, Knehr went 6–3 on the mound with a 2.40 ERA, 93 strikeouts and a 1.33 WHIP in 90 innings pitched. In 2017, he played collegiate summer baseball with the Chatham Anglers of the Cape Cod Baseball League.

== Professional career ==
=== San Diego Padres ===
The San Diego Padres selected Knehr in the 20th round of the 2018 Major League Baseball draft. After signing with the team, he was initially assigned to the rookie-level Arizona League Padres before being promoted to the Single-A Fort Wayne TinCaps of the Midwest League. Knehr spent the 2019 season with the High-A Lake Elsinore Storm of the California League and went 3–5 with a 5.43 ERA, 83 strikeouts and a 1.49 WHIP in 66 1/3 innings pitched. After the season, the Padres sent him to the Arizona Fall League, where he played for the Peoria Javelinas.

Knehr did not play in a game in 2020 due to the cancellation of the minor league season because of the COVID-19 pandemic. Knehr was named to the Padres' 2021 Spring Training roster as a non-roster invitee and entered the season as the organization's 24th-ranked prospect by MLB.com. He was assigned to the Double-A San Antonio Missions to begin the year.

On July 9, 2021, Knehr was selected to the 40-man roster and promoted to the major leagues for the first time. He made his MLB debut that day as the starting pitcher against the Colorado Rockies, pitching 3 2/3 innings while allowing two runs. In the game, he also recorded his first career strikeout, striking out Rockies outfielder Raimel Tapia. He made 12 appearances (5 starts) for the Padres in his rookie campaign, posting a 1–2 record and 4.97 ERA with 20 strikeouts in 29 innings pitched. Knehr appeared in 5 games for San Diego in 2022, recording a 3.95 ERA in 13 2/3 innings of work. The majority of his season was spent with the Triple-A El Paso Chihuahuas, where he pitched to a 4–4 record and 6.88 ERA with 92 strikeouts in 87 2/3 innings pitched across 32 games (15 starts).

Knehr was optioned to Triple-A El Paso to begin the 2023 season. He struggled in 4 games for San Diego before he was placed on the injured list with right elbow discomfort on June 28, 2023. Knehr was transferred to the 60–day injured list on July 18. On November 14, Knehr was removed from the 40–man roster and sent outright to Triple–A El Paso.

Knehr missed the entirety of the 2024 season in recovery from Tommy John surgery. He elected free agency following the season on November 4, 2024. On February 25, 2025, Knehr re-signed with the Padres organization on a minor league contract. He made 18 appearances for Triple-A El Paso, registering a 2-2 record and 2.70 ERA with 24 strikeouts and eight saves across 16 2/3 innings pitched. Knehr elected free agency following the season on November 6.

=== Milwaukee Brewers ===
On April 9, 2026, Knehr signed a minor league contract with the Milwaukee Brewers. In 32 games with Triple-A Nashville Sounds he threw 38 innings going 6-3 with a 3.08 ERA with 40 strikeouts and 3 saves. He elected free agency on November 2.
