= Webster Rivas =

Dominican baseball player (born 1990)

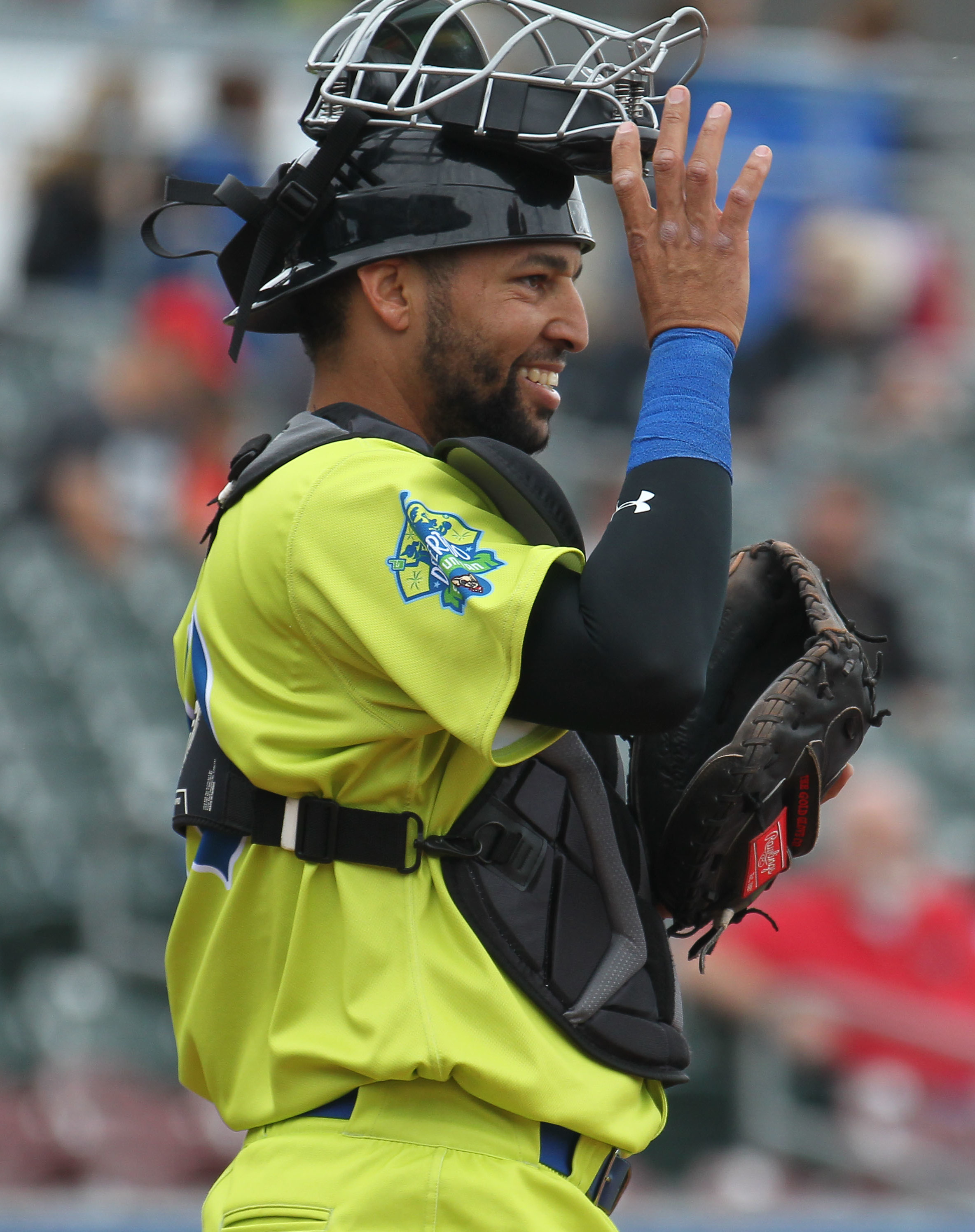
- Rivas with the El Paso Chihuahuas in 2019

Caliente de Durango – No. 27
- Catcher / First baseman
- Born: August 8, 1990 (age 35); Nagua, Dominican Republic
- Bats: Right Throws: Right

MLB debut
- May 28, 2021, for the San Diego Padres

MLB statistics (through 2021 season)
- Batting average: .221
- Home runs: 2
- Runs batted in: 4
- Stats at Baseball Reference

Teams
- San Diego Padres (2021)

Webster Julian Rivas (born August 8, 1990) is a Dominican professional baseball catcher and first baseman for the Caliente de Durango of the Mexican League. He has previously played in Major League Baseball (MLB) for the San Diego Padres. He signed with the Los Angeles Dodgers as an international free agent in 2010.

== Career ==
=== Los Angeles Dodgers ===
On May 28, 2010, Rivas signed with the Los Angeles Dodgers organization as an international free agent. He made his professional debut with the Dominican Summer League Dodgers, and played with the team in 2010 and 2011, registering .246 and .279 batting averages, respectively.

In 2012, Rivas played for the Arizona League Dodgers, but only appeared in seven games. The next year, he split the season between the Single-A Great Lakes Loons and the High-A Rancho Cucamonga Quakes, slashing .233/.285/.293 between the two teams. Rivas spent the 2014 season with Great Lakes, slashing .254/.303/.370 with five home runs and 32 RBI in 91 games. He split the 2015 season between four different Dodgers affiliates: Great Lakes, Rancho Cucamonga, the Double-A Tulsa Drillers, and the Triple-A Oklahoma City Dodgers, posting a .270/.309/.358 batting line between the four teams. On November 6, 2015, Rivas elected free agency.

=== Los Angeles Angels ===
On February 15, 2016, Rivas signed a minor league contract with the Los Angeles Angels organization. He split the year between three Angels affiliates, the Triple-A Salt Lake Bees, the High-A Inland Empire 66ers, and the Single-A Burlington Bees, posting a batting line of .215/.271/.280 in 33 games between the three teams. On November 7, 2016, Rivas elected free agency.

=== San Diego Padres ===
On December 21, 2016, Rivas signed a minor league contract with the San Diego Padres organization. He split the 2017 season between the Single-A Fort Wayne TinCaps and the Double-A San Antonio Missions, slashing .268/.335/.366 with 2 home runs and 30 RBI in 64 games. Rivas was invited to spring training in 2018, but did not make the team and was assigned to San Antonio, where he spent the year, hitting .276/.319/.373 with four home runs and 23 RBI.

Rivas was again invited to spring training in 2019, but again did not make the club and was assigned to the Double-A Amarillo Sod Poodles. He split the year between Amarillo and the Triple-A El Paso Chihuahuas, batting .281/.371/.420 with career-highs in home runs (6) and RBI (36). Rivas did not play in a game in 2020 due to the cancellation of the minor league season because of the COVID-19 pandemic. He was added to the Padres’ 60-man player pool for the season but did not appear for the major league club. He was assigned to El Paso to begin the 2021 season, and hit one home run with five RBI in 10 games to begin the year.

On May 28, 2021, Rivas was selected to the 40-man roster and promoted to the major leagues for the first time, starting at catcher for San Diego in that day's game against the Houston Astros. Rivas went 0-for-3 in the game, but recorded his first caught stealing, gunning down Astros outfielder Myles Straw at second base. On May 30, Rivas recorded his first major league hit, home run, and RBI, with a solo shot off of Astros starter Zack Greinke. Rivas played in 24 games for the Padres, hitting .221 with 2 home runs and 4 RBI's. On October 30, Rivas was outrighted off of the 40-man roster.

Rivas became a free agent following the season, but re-signed with San Diego on a minor league deal on January 14, 2022. In 78 games split between Triple–A El Paso and Double–A San Antonio, he batted a combined .254/.375/.339 with one home run and 35 RBI. Rivas elected free agency following the season on November 10.

=== Leones de Yucatán ===
On November 23, 2023, Rivas signed with the Leones de Yucatán of the Mexican League. In 68 appearances for Yucatán in 2024, he slashed .281/.360/.439 with seven home runs and 32 RBI.

Rivas made 74 appearances for Yucatán in 2025, slashing .292/.371/.409 with six home runs, 40 RBI, and one stolen base.

=== Caliente de Durango ===
On November 14, 2025, Rivas and Odrisamer Despaigne were traded to the Caliente de Durango of the Mexican League in exchange for Geraldi Díaz.
