= Miguel Díaz (baseball) =

Dominican baseball player (born 1994)

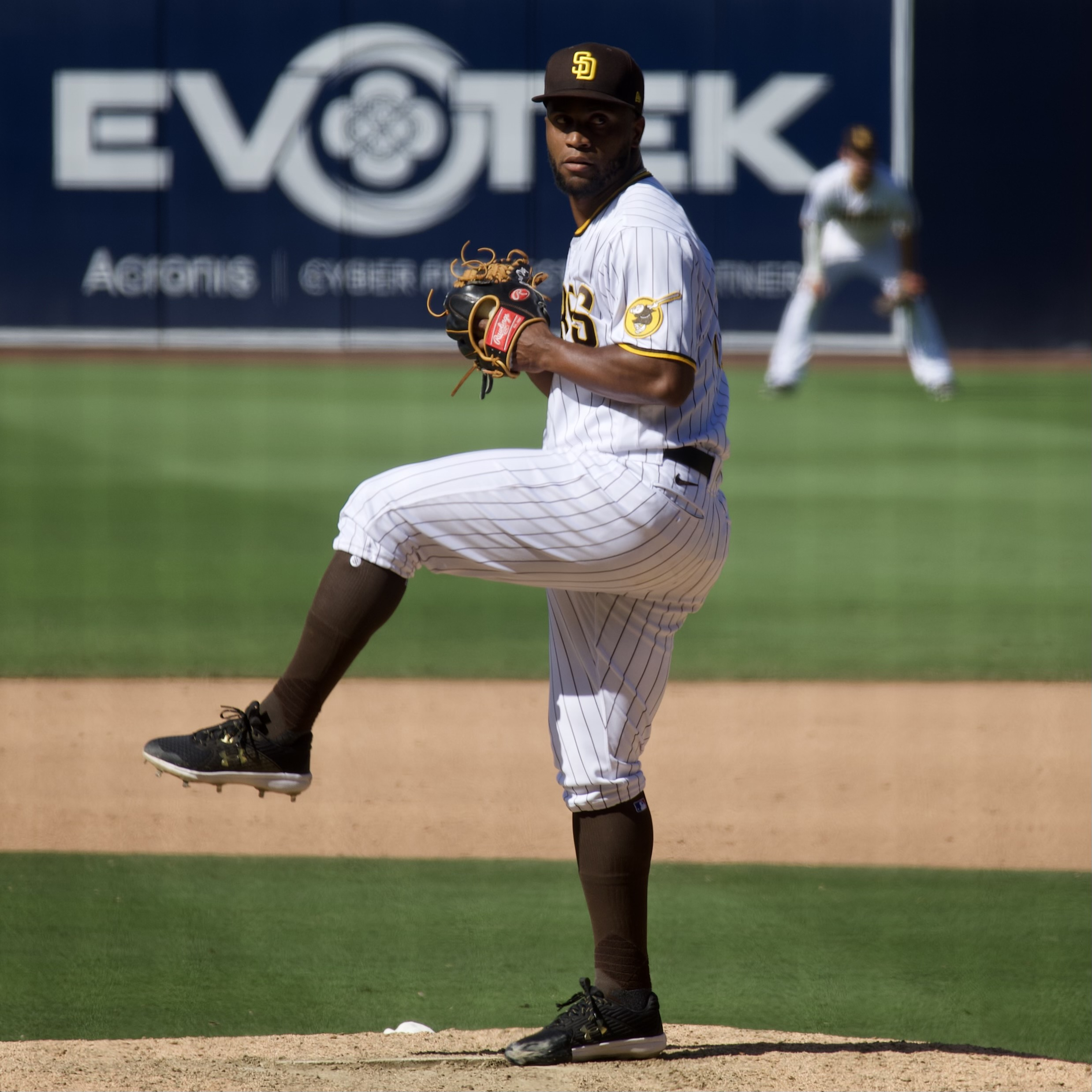
- Díaz pitching for the Padres in 2021

Toros de Tijuana – No. 45
- Pitcher
- Born: November 28, 1994 (age 31); San Cristóbal, Dominican Republic
- Bats: Right Throws: Right

MLB debut
- April 3, 2017, for the San Diego Padres

MLB statistics (through 2024 season)
- Win–loss record: 6–2
- Earned run average: 4.81
- Strikeouts: 132
- Stats at Baseball Reference

Teams
- San Diego Padres (2017–2019, 2021); Detroit Tigers (2022–2023); Houston Astros (2024)

Miguel Angel Díaz (born November 28, 1994) is a Dominican professional baseball pitcher for the Toros de Tijuana of the Mexican League. He has previously played in Major League Baseball (MLB) for the San Diego Padres, Detroit Tigers, and Houston Astros.

== Career ==
=== Milwaukee Brewers ===
Díaz signed with the Milwaukee Brewers as an international free agent on December 1, 2011. He pitched in the Dominican Summer League as a 17- and 18-year old, and then spent the 2014 and 2015 seasons in the rookie-level Arizona League. In 2016, he worked in the Single–A Midwest League, starting 15 games and making 11 more appearances out of the bullpen with the Wisconsin Timber Rattlers.

=== San Diego Padres ===
Díaz was selected by the Minnesota Twins with the first pick of the 2016 Rule 5 draft and was then traded to the San Diego Padres. Díaz made the Padres' 2017 Opening Day roster and made his Major League debut on Opening Day. Díaz was initially used as a reliever, but transitioned into a starter role in June. While making his third start, Díaz suffered a forearm strain and ended up on the disabled list. He returned to the Padres in September, again pitching in relief. For the 2017 season, he totaled 33 strikeouts in 41 2/3 innings and a 7.34 ERA.

In 2018, the Padres intended to develop Díaz as a starter, and he was optioned early in the spring to minor league camp. Díaz began the season with the Double-A San Antonio Missions, where the Padres tried to stretch out his arm, and then was promoted to Triple-A El Paso in mid-May. He was moved back to San Antonio in June after struggling with El Paso.

The Padres called up Díaz for a single game at the beginning of July to help rest an over-extended bullpen. Díaz struck out four batters in one of the two scoreless innings he pitched, becoming only the second Padre to accomplish the feat. Díaz returned to the Major League club in mid-August and stayed with the team for the remainder of the season, working out of the bullpen. He finished with a 4.82 ERA, 30 strike-outs, and 12 walks in 18 2/3 innings at the big league level. In his 65 innings with San Antonio, he had a 2.35 ERA and 66 strike-outs versus 30 walks. After the season, Díaz was placed in the Arizona Fall League to improve his command and work out mechanical flaws.

On December 2, 2019, Díaz was non-tendered and became a free agent. He re-signed with San Diego the next day on a minor league contract that included an invitation to Spring Training. Díaz did not play in a game in 2020 due to the cancellation of the minor league season because of the COVID-19 pandemic.

On February 12, 2021, Díaz signed with the San Diego Padres organization on a minor league deal that included an invitation to Spring Training. On April 30, 2021, Díaz was selected to the active roster. He made his season debut on May 3 as the starting pitcher against the Pittsburgh Pirates. Díaz made 25 appearances for San Diego in 2021, posting a 3.64 ERA with 46 strikeouts in 42.0 innings of work. On October 30, Díaz was outrighted off of the 40-man roster and elected free agency on November 7.

=== Detroit Tigers ===
On March 12, 2022, Díaz signed a minor league contract with the Detroit Tigers. Diaz spent most of 2022 playing for the Triple-A Toledo Mud Hens, pitching in 58 games and posting a 4–5 record and 4.29 ERA with 69 strikeouts and 7 saves in 65.0 innings pitched. On September 29, Diaz's contract was selected by the Tigers.

On November 15, Díaz was designated for assignment by the Tigers. On November 18, Díaz was non–tendered and became a free agent. He re-signed a minor league deal on November 29. In 49 games for Triple–A Toledo, he registered a 5.05 ERA with 73 strikeouts and 14 saves in 57.0 innings of work. On September 1, 2023, Díaz was selected to the major league roster. In 12 relief outings, he posted a strong 0.64 ERA with 16 strikeouts across 14 innings pitched.

On March 28, 2024, Díaz was designated for assignment after failing to make Detroit's Opening Day roster.

=== Houston Astros ===
On April 4, 2024, Díaz was claimed off waivers by the Houston Astros. He made one scoreless outing before being designated for assignment on April 8. On April 11, Díaz cleared waivers and was sent outright to the Triple–A Sugar Land Space Cowboys; however he subsequently rejected the assignment and elected free agency. He re–signed with the Astros on a minor league contract the next day. In 13 games for Triple–A Sugar Land, Díaz struggle to a 9.64 ERA with 10 strikeouts across 14 innings. He was released by the Astros organization on May 27.

=== Detroit Tigers (second stint) ===
On June 9, 2024, Díaz signed a minor league contract with the Detroit Tigers organization. In 24 appearances for the Triple-A Toledo Mud Hens, he logged a 1.97 ERA with 44 strikeouts and 4 saves across 32 innings pitched. Díaz elected free agency following the season on November 4.

=== San Francisco Giants ===
On December 28, 2024, Díaz signed a minor league contract with the San Francisco Giants. He made 50 appearances for the Triple-A Sacramento River Cats in 2025, compiling a 5–1 record and 3.45 ERA with 55 strikeouts and nine saves across 57 1/3 innings pitched. Díaz elected free agency following the season on November 6, 2025.

=== Toros de Tijuana ===
On February 10, 2026, Díaz signed with the Toros de Tijuana of the Mexican League.

== See also ==
- Rule 5 draft results
