= Tucupita Marcano =

Venezuelan baseball player (born 1999)

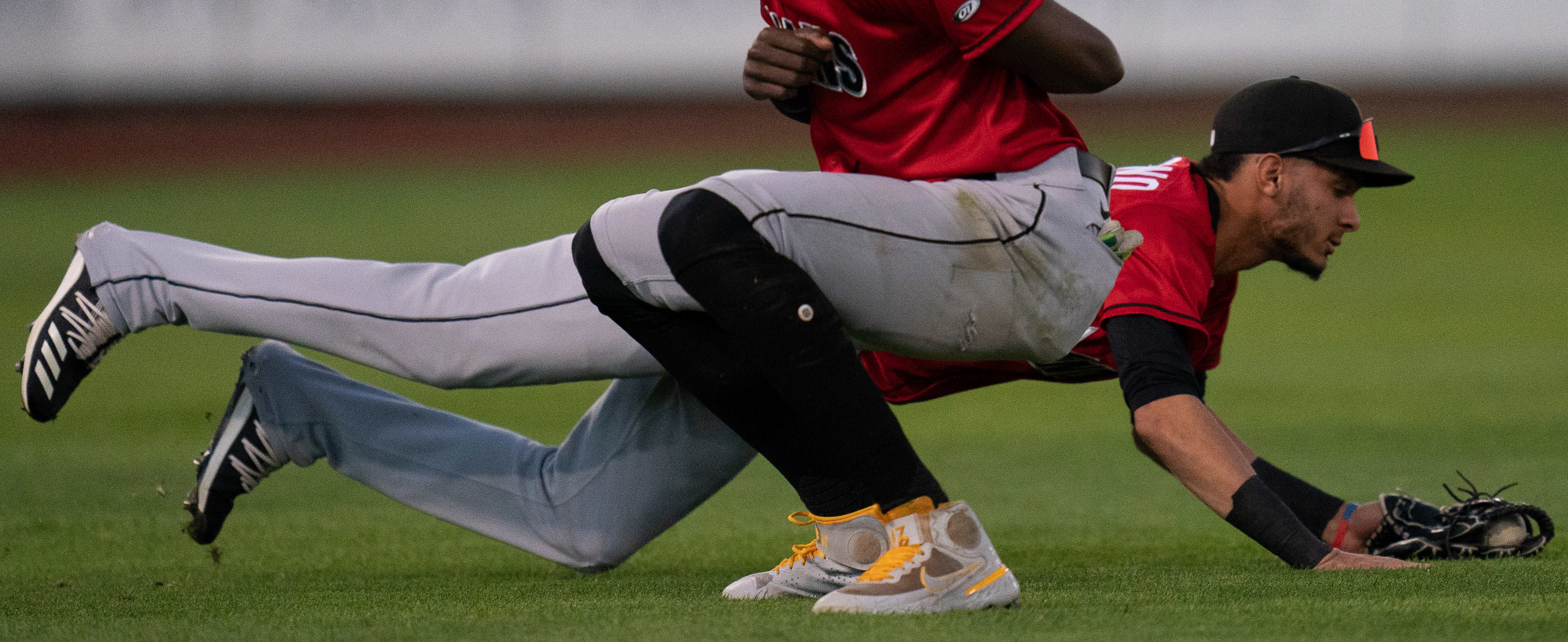
- Marcano with the Indianapolis Indians in 2021

Fargo-Moorhead RedHawks – No. 1
- Utility player
- Born: September 16, 1999 (age 27); Tucupita, Venezuela
- Bats: Left Throws: Right

MLB debut
- April 1, 2021, for the San Diego Padres

MLB statistics (through 2023 season)
- Batting average: .217
- Home runs: 5
- Runs batted in: 34
- Stats at Baseball Reference

Teams
- San Diego Padres (2021); Pittsburgh Pirates (2022–2023)

Tucupita Jose Marcano (born September 16, 1999) is a Venezuelan professional baseball utility player for the Fargo-Moorhead RedHawks of the American Association of Professional Baseball. He previously played in Major League Baseball (MLB) for the San Diego Padres and Pittsburgh Pirates. In 2024, he was banned from MLB for life for betting on Pirates games while on the team's injured list.

== Career ==
=== San Diego Padres ===
On July 2, 2016, Marcano signed with the San Diego Padres as an international free agent. Marcano made his professional debut in 2017 with the Dominican Summer League Padres, slashing .206/.337/.353 in 49 games. In 2018, Marcano split the season between the AZL Padres and the Low-A Tri-City Dust Devils, accumulating a .366/.450/.438 slash line with 1 home run and 26 RBI. The following season, Marcano played with the Single-A Fort Wayne TinCaps, hitting .270/.323/.337 with 2 home runs and 45 RBI in 111 games with the team. Marcano did not play in a game in 2020 due to the cancellation of the minor league season because of the COVID-19 pandemic. The Padres added him to their 40-man roster after the 2020 season.

On April 1, 2021, Marcano made his MLB debut as a pinch hitter for Keone Kela, and drew a walk against Stefan Crichton of the Arizona Diamondbacks. On April 6, Marcano collected his first major league hit, a single off of San Francisco Giants reliever Wandy Peralta. After going 2-for-12 with an RBI in 10 games for the Padres, Marcano was optioned off the roster and assigned to the Triple-A El Paso Chihuahuas to begin the minor league season.

=== Pittsburgh Pirates ===
On July 26, 2021, the Padres traded Marcano, Jack Suwinski, and Michell Miliano to the Pittsburgh Pirates in exchange for Adam Frazier. Marcano finished the season with the Triple-A Indianapolis Indians, then began the 2022 campaign with the Double-A Altoona Curve. He appeared in one game in April against the Milwaukee Brewers as a pinch hitter, and was recalled to the major leagues on May 27, 2022. He hit his first MLB home run off of Dodgers pitcher Walker Buehler on May 30.

The Pirates optioned Marcano to Triple-A Indianapolis to begin the 2023 season. He was recalled to the majors on April 15. Playing in 75 games for Pittsburgh, he hit .233/.276/.356 with 3 home runs and 18 RBI. On July 25, 2023, Marcano was placed on the 60–day injured list with a right knee ligament injury. On August 3, it was confirmed that Marcano had suffered a torn anterior cruciate ligament (ACL) and would require surgery.

=== San Diego Padres (second stint) ===
On November 2, 2023, Marcano was claimed off waivers by the Padres. He began the 2024 season on the injured list as he continued his recovery from ACL surgery.

==== Permanent ineligibility ====
On June 4, 2024, Marcano was banned for life from MLB and four other players were each suspended for one year for violating the league's gambling policy. The league stated that Marcano began betting on Pirates games during the 2023 season while recovering from surgery. MLB found that Marcano placed 387 bets on MLB and international contests, wagering more than $150,000 between October 2022 and November 2023. Almost all of his bets on Pirates games were on which club would win or over–under bets on the number of runs scored, and many were parlay bets. He denied having inside information that would influence his bets, which MLB confirmed. He won just 4.3% of his wagers, according to the league.

=== Fargo-Moorhead RedHawks ===
On October 16, 2025, Marcano signed with the Fargo-Moorhead RedHawks of the independent American Association of Professional Baseball.

On October 1, 2026, Marcano re-signed with the RedHawks for the 2027 season.

== Personal life ==
Marcano was named after his birthplace, the Venezuelan city of Tucupita. Tucupita is also his father Raul's nickname.

== See also ==
- List of people banned from Major League Baseball
