= 2023 Washington Nationals season =

2023 Washington Nationals
- League: National League
- Division: East
- Ballpark: Nationals Park
- City: Washington, D.C.
- Record: 71–91 (.438)
- Divisional place: 5th
- Owners: Lerner Enterprises
- General managers: Mike Rizzo
- Managers: Dave Martinez
- Television: MASN (Bob Carpenter, Dan Kolko, Kevin Frandsen, Ryan Zimmerman)
- Radio: 106.7 The Fan; Washington Nationals Radio Network (Charlie Slowes, Dave Jageler)

The 2023 Washington Nationals season was the Nationals' 19th season as the Major League Baseball franchise in the District of Columbia, the 16th season at Nationals Park, and the 55th since the original team was started in Montreal, Quebec, Canada. The Nationals were led by Dave Martinez in his sixth year as manager. They were members of the National League East.

The Nationals started out rough, having a 36–54 (.400) record at the All-Star Break, but briefly bounced back, going 25–15 (.625) after the All-Star break, including an 11–4 (.733) stretch after being no-hit by Michael Lorenzen on August 9, to improve to 61–69 (.469). However, they went 10–22 (.313) to finish 71–91 (.438) the season following this. Although they improved on their 55–107 record from 2022, which was an MLB-worst, they still finished in last place in the division for the third straight season. On September 18, the Nationals were eliminated from playoff contention for the fourth straight year.

The Washington Nationals drew an average home attendance of 23,034 in 81 home games in the 2023 MLB season. The total attendance was 1,865,832.

== Previous season ==
The Nationals finished the 2022 season with an MLB-worst record of 55–107. They finished in last place in the NL East, 46 games out of first.

== Offseason ==
The Nationals entered the offseason with seven pending free agents: pitchers Steve Cishek, Sean Doolittle, Will Harris, Erasmo Ramírez, Joe Ross, and Aníbal Sánchez, and infielder/outfielder César Hernández. Additionally, designated hitter Nelson Cruz became a free agent after the Nationals declined their side of a mutual option for the 2023 season, while pitcher Francisco Pérez and catcher Tres Barrera also became free agents after being outrighted to the minor leagues. The Nationals immediately signed Doolittle back on a minor league deal announced November 6, 2022, inviting him to major league spring training as well. Ramírez also signed a new deal, a one-year major league contract, to remain with the Nationals. Pérez returned to the organization on a minor league deal with an invitation to spring training. Cishek announced his retirement from professional baseball in December.

Among arbitration-eligible players, the Nationals chose not to tender new one-year contracts to pitcher Erick Fedde and designated hitter Luke Voit on November 18, 2022. They reached agreement on a new deal with infielder Ildemaro Vargas, avoiding arbitration, and tendered new contracts to seven more arbitration-eligible players: pitchers Víctor Arano, Carl Edwards Jr., Kyle Finnegan, Hunter Harvey, and Tanner Rainey and outfielders Víctor Robles and Lane Thomas. The Nationals also non-tendered pitcher Tommy Romero, who signed a minor league deal to remain with the organization, and cleared additional roster space by releasing pitcher Seth Romero, facing charges in Texas for driving under the influence, and outrighting pitchers Evan Lee and Jackson Tetreault and outfielders Yasel Antuna, Yadiel Hernández, and Josh Palacios to the minor leagues. Infielder Lucius Fox lost his roster spot in December as well, as did pitching prospect Gerardo Carrillo and journeyman reliever Reed Garrett. Another reliever, right-hander Andrés Machado, was cut loose in January after two seasons in the Nationals' bullpen.

The Nationals unveiled their first major league signings of the offseason on November 29, 2022, inking rookie outfielder Stone Garrett and veteran third baseman Jeimer Candelario to one-year deals. They added right-hander Thad Ward, a Boston Red Sox prospect, to their roster via the Rule 5 draft on December 7. Trevor Williams was signed December 10 to join the Nationals' rotation. Washington also added outfielder Corey Dickerson on a one-year deal January 10, 2023. The Nationals also claimed right-hander A. J. Alexy from the Texas Rangers and former top infield prospect Jeter Downs of the Red Sox off waivers, although Alexy was later designated for assignment and traded to the Minnesota Twins to clear a roster spot for first baseman Dominic Smith, whom the Nationals signed January 4, 2023.

Among other minor league signings, the Nationals reunited with first baseman Matt Adams, a member of their 2019 World Series championship team, in a deal announced December 14, 2022.

Media reports and rumors have linked the Nationals to other free agents during the offseason, including right-handed pitchers Seth Lugo (ultimately signed with the San Diego Padres) and Jordan Lyles (ultimately signed with the Kansas City Royals) catcher Gary Sánchez, and first baseman/outfielder Trey Mancini (ultimately signed with the Chicago Cubs).

=== Transactions ===
- November 6, 2022: The Nationals signed left-handed pitcher Sean Doolittle to a minor league contract with an invitation to spring training.
- November 10, 2022: The Nationals outrighted left-handed pitcher Francisco Pérez and catcher Tres Barrera to the Triple-A Rochester Red Wings.
- November 14, 2022: The Nationals released left-handed pitcher Seth Romero.
- November 15, 2022: The Nationals designated right-handed pitcher Tommy Romero for assignment, outrighted left-handed pitcher Evan Lee, right-handed pitcher Jackson Tetreault, and outfielder Yadiel Hernández to the Triple-A Rochester Red Wings, and selected the contracts of left-handed pitchers Matt Cronin and José A. Ferrer, right-handed pitchers Jake Irvin and Jackson Rutledge, infielder Jake Alu, and outfielder Jeremy De La Rosa.
- November 18, 2022: The Nationals declined to tender new contracts to right-handed pitchers Erick Fedde and Tommy Romero and designated hitter Luke Voit.
- November 29, 2022: The Nationals signed infielder Jeimer Candelario and outfielder Stone Garrett to major league contracts.
- December 1, 2022: The Nationals outrighted outfielders Yasel Antuna and Josh Palacios to the minor leagues.
- December 7, 2022: The Nationals selected right-handed pitcher Thad Ward from the Boston Red Sox in the Rule 5 draft.
- December 10, 2022: The Nationals signed right-handed pitcher Trevor Williams to a two-year major league contract.
- December 13, 2022: The Nationals claimed right-handed pitcher A. J. Alexy off waivers from the Texas Rangers and designated infielder Lucius Fox for assignment; he was outrighted to the minor leagues.
- December 14, 2022: The Nationals signed right-handed pitchers Anthony Castro and Tommy Romero and infielders Matt Adams and Travis Blankenhorn to minor league contracts with invitations to spring training.
- December 20, 2022: The Nationals signed right-handed pitcher Erasmo Ramírez to a one-year major league contract and designated right-handed pitcher Gerardo Carrillo for assignment; he was outrighted to the minor leagues.
- December 22, 2022: The Nationals claimed infielder Jeter Downs off waivers from the Boston Red Sox and designated right-handed pitcher Reed Garrett for assignment; he elected free agency.
- January 4, 2023: The Nationals signed first baseman Dominic Smith to a one-year major league contract; signed left-handed pitchers Anthony Banda and Francisco Pérez and infielder Michael Chavis to minor league contracts with invitations to spring training; and designated right-handed pitcher A. J. Alexy for assignment.
- January 10, 2023: The Nationals traded right-handed pitcher A. J. Alexy to the Minnesota Twins for minor league pitcher Cristian Jiménez; signed outfielder Corey Dickerson to a one-year major league contract; and designated right-handed pitcher Andrés Machado for assignment.
- January 27, 2023: The Nationals signed right-handed pitcher Alex Colomé to a minor league contract with an invitation to spring training.
- January 31, 2023: The Nationals signed right-handed pitcher Wily Peralta to a minor league contract with an invitation to spring training.
- February 4, 2023: The Nationals signed right-handed pitcher Chad Kuhl to a minor league contract with an invitation to spring training.
- March 11, 2023: The Nationals signed catcher Keibert Ruiz to an eight-year contract extension with club options for the 2031 and 2032 seasons.

=== Spring training ===
The Nationals held spring training at their facility at The Ballpark of the Palm Beaches in West Palm Beach, Florida, which they share with the Houston Astros in their seventh year at the facility.

Non-roster participants in major league spring training for the Nationals included right-handed pitchers Zach Brzykcy, Gerardo Carrillo, Anthony Castro, Alex Colomé, Hobie Harris, Chad Kuhl, Andrés Machado, Wily Peralta, Tommy Romero, and Jackson Tetreault; left-handed pitchers Alberto Baldonado, Anthony Banda, Sean Doolittle, Evan Lee, and Francisco Pérez; catchers Brady Lindsly and Drew Millas; first baseman Matt Adams; infielders Michael Chavis, Lucius Fox, Erick Mejia, and Leonel Valera; and outfielders Yasel Antuna, Travis Blankenhorn, Donovan Casey, Yadiel Hernández, and Derek Hill.

Veteran right-hander Stephen Strasburg did not report to spring training in West Palm Beach after suffering a setback in his quest to return from thoracic outlet syndrome. Players present in camp but not as full participants included right-handed reliever Tanner Rainey, working his way back from Tommy John surgery the previous season; right-hander Jackson Tetreault, who had a season-ending shoulder fracture in 2022; left-handed reliever Sean Doolittle, who had an elbow brace procedure the previous season; and third baseman Carter Kieboom, who also had Tommy John surgery in 2022. Additionally, non-roster outfielder Derek Hill suffered a hamstring strain while running to first base during a game, and catcher Israel Pineda suffered a displaced pinky finger when he was struck by a pitch, while Kieboom experienced shoulder discomfort following a game, forcing them to slow down their ramp-up for the season. Reliever Víctor Arano was also sidelined with a nerve impingement in his right shoulder.

During spring training, the Nationals unveiled a contract extension with 24-year-old catcher Keibert Ruiz, keeping him under team control through the 2032 season.

== Regular season ==
=== Transactions ===
- March 30, 2023: The Nationals selected the contracts of left-handed pitcher Anthony Banda, right-handed pitchers Chad Kuhl and Hobie Harris, and infielder Michael Chavis.
- April 14, 2023: The Nationals signed infielder Richie Martin and outfielder Nomar Mazara to minor league deals.
- April 30, 2023: The Nationals designated left-handed pitcher Anthony Banda for assignment and selected the contract of right-handed pitcher Andrés Machado.
- May 18, 2023: The Nationals signed catcher Luis Torrens and outfielder Franmil Reyes to minor league deals.
- June 6, 2023: The Nationals designated right-handed pitcher Andrés Machado for assignment.
- June 7, 2023: The Nationals designated right-handed pitcher Erasmo Ramírez for assignment.
- June 8, 2023: The Nationals claimed left-handed pitcher Joe La Sorsa off waivers from the Tampa Bay Rays.
- June 21, 2023: The Nationals selected the contract of outfielder Derek Hill.
- June 24, 2023: The Nationals designated right-handed pitcher Chad Kuhl for assignment.
- June 26, 2023: The Nationals selected the contract of right-handed pitcher Amos Willingham.
- July 3, 2023: The Nationals signed right-handed pitcher Daniel Mengden and catcher Jacob Nottingham to minor league deals.
- July 5, 2023: The Nationals designated outfielder Derek Hill for assignment.
- July 12, 2023: The Nationals signed right-handed pitcher Rico Garcia to a minor league deal.
- July 17, 2023: The Nationals claimed right-handed pitcher Roddery Muñoz off waivers from the Atlanta Braves.
- July 19, 2023: The Nationals selected the contract of right-handed pitcher Rico Garcia.
- July 31, 2023: The Nationals acquired minor league pitcher DJ Herz and minor league infielder Kevin Made from the Chicago Cubs for third baseman Jeimer Candelario.
- August 1, 2023: The Nationals claimed left-handed pitcher Robert Garcia off waivers from the Miami Marlins.
- August 2, 2023: The Nationals released outfielder Corey Dickerson.
- August 4, 2023: The Nationals selected the contract of outfielder Blake Rutherford.
- August 6, 2023: The Nationals released right-handed pitcher Paolo Espino.
- August 22, 2023: The Nationals signed manager Dave Martinez to a two-year contract extension.
- August 26, 2023: The Nationals selected the contract of outfielder Jacob Young.
- August 28, 2023: The Nationals selected the contract of catcher Drew Millas.
- September 1, 2023: The Nationals selected the contract of infielder/outfielder Travis Blankenhorn and released right-handed pitcher Rico Garcia.
- September 27, 2023: The Nationals signed infielder Ildemaro Vargas to a one-year major league contract extension.

=== Major league debuts ===
- April 1, 2023: Thaddeus Ward, Hobie Harris
- May 3, 2023: Jake Irvin
- May 9, 2023: Jake Alu
- June 28, 2023: Amos Willingham
- July 1, 2023: José A. Ferrer
- August 4, 2023: Blake Rutherford
- August 26, 2023: Jacob Young
- August 28, 2023: Drew Millas
- September 13, 2023: Jackson Rutledge

=== Season standings ===
==== National League East ====
NL East
Team	W	L	Pct.	GB	Home	Road
Atlanta Braves	104	58	.642	—	52‍–‍29	52‍–‍29
Philadelphia Phillies	90	72	.556	14	49‍–‍32	41‍–‍40
Miami Marlins	84	78	.519	20	46‍–‍35	38‍–‍43
New York Mets	75	87	.463	29	43‍–‍38	32‍–‍49
Washington Nationals	71	91	.438	33	34‍–‍47	37‍–‍44

==== National League Wild Card ====
Division leaders
Team	W	L	Pct.
Atlanta Braves	104	58	.642
Los Angeles Dodgers	100	62	.617
Milwaukee Brewers	92	70	.568

Wild Card teams (Top 3 teams qualify for postseason)
Team	W	L	Pct.	GB
Philadelphia Phillies	90	72	.556	+6
Miami Marlins	84	78	.519	—
Arizona Diamondbacks	84	78	.519	—
Chicago Cubs	83	79	.512	1
San Diego Padres	82	80	.506	2
Cincinnati Reds	82	80	.506	2
San Francisco Giants	79	83	.488	5
Pittsburgh Pirates	76	86	.469	8
New York Mets	75	87	.463	9
St. Louis Cardinals	71	91	.438	13
Washington Nationals	71	91	.438	13
Colorado Rockies	59	103	.364	25

=== Record vs. opponents ===
==== Record vs. National League ====
2023 National League record Source: MLB Standings Grid – 2023
Team	AZ	ATL	CHC	CIN	COL	LAD	MIA	MIL	NYM	PHI	PIT	SD	SF	STL	WSH	AL
Arizona	—	3–3	6–1	3–4	10–3	5–8	2–4	4–2	1–6	3–4	4–2	7–6	7–6	3–3	5–1	21–25
Atlanta	3–3	—	4–2	5–1	7–0	4–3	9–4	5–1	10–3	8–5	4–3	3–4	4–2	4–2	8–5	26–20
Chicago	1–6	2–4	—	6–7	4–2	3–4	2–4	6–7	3–3	1–5	10–3	4–3	5–1	8–5	3–4	25–21
Cincinnati	4–3	1–5	7–6	—	4–2	4–2	3–3	3–10	4–2	3–4	5–8	3–3	3–4	6–7	4–3	28–18
Colorado	3–10	0–7	2–4	2–4	—	3–10	5–2	4–2	4–2	2–5	2–4	4–9	4–9	3–3	3–4	18–28
Los Angeles	8–5	3–4	4–3	2–4	10–3	—	3–3	5–1	3–3	4–2	4–3	9–4	7–6	4–3	4–2	30–16
Miami	4–2	4–9	4–2	3–3	2–5	3–3	—	3–4	4–8	7–6	5–2	2–4	3–3	3–4	11–2	26–20
Milwaukee	2–4	1–5	7–6	10–3	2–4	1–5	4–3	—	6–1	4–2	8–5	6–1	2–5	8–5	3–3	28–18
New York	6–1	3–10	3–3	2–4	2–4	3–3	8–4	1–6	—	6–7	3–3	3–3	4–3	4–3	7–6	19–27
Philadelphia	4–3	5–8	5–1	4–3	5–2	2–4	6–7	2–4	7–6	—	3–3	5–2	2–4	5–1	7–6	28–18
Pittsburgh	2–4	3–4	3–10	8–5	4–2	3–4	2–5	5–8	3–3	3–3	—	5–1	2–4	9–4	5–2	19–27
San Diego	6–7	4–3	3–4	3–3	9–4	4–9	4–2	1–6	3–3	2–5	1–5	—	8–5	3–3	3–3	28–18
San Francisco	6–7	2–4	1–5	4–3	9–4	6–7	3–3	5–2	3–4	4–2	4–2	5–8	—	6–1	1–5	20–26
St. Louis	3–3	2–4	5–8	7–6	3–3	3–4	4–3	5–8	3–4	1–5	4–9	3–3	1–6	—	4–2	23–23
Washington	1–5	5–8	4–3	3–4	4–3	2–4	2–11	3–3	6–7	6–7	2–5	3–3	5–1	2–4	—	23–23

Updated with the results of all games through October 1, 2023.

==== Record vs. American League ====
2023 National League record vs. American League Source: MLB Standings
Team	BAL	BOS	CWS	CLE	DET	HOU	KC	LAA	MIN	NYY	OAK	SEA	TB	TEX	TOR
Arizona	1–2	1–2	2–1	2–1	3–0	0–3	2–1	2–1	0–3	1–2	2–1	1–2	1–2	3–1	0–3
Atlanta	2–1	1–3	1–2	2–1	2–1	0–3	3–0	2–1	3–0	3–0	1–2	2–1	2–1	2–1	0–3
Chicago	2–1	1–2	3–1	1–2	2–1	0–3	2–1	0–3	1–2	2–1	3–0	2–1	2–1	2–1	2–1
Cincinnati	2–1	2–1	1–2	2–2	2–1	3–0	3–0	3–0	1–2	0–3	2–1	2–1	1–2	3–0	1–2
Colorado	1–2	2–1	2–1	2–1	1–2	1–3	2–1	2–1	1–2	2–1	1–2	0–3	0–3	0–3	1–2
Los Angeles	2–1	2–1	2–1	2–1	2–1	2–1	1–2	4–0	2–1	1–2	3–0	3–0	1–2	2–1	1–2
Miami	0–3	3–0	2–1	2–1	2–1	1–2	3–0	3–0	2–1	2–1	3–0	1–2	1–3	0–3	1–2
Milwaukee	2–1	1–2	3–0	2–1	1–2	2–1	3–0	2–1	2–2	2–1	0–3	3–0	1–2	3–0	1–2
New York	0–3	1–2	2–1	3–0	0–3	1–2	0–3	1–2	1–2	2–2	3–0	2–1	2–1	1–2	0–3
Philadelphia	2–1	1–2	2–1	1–2	3–0	2–1	2–1	2–1	1–2	1–2	3–0	2–1	3–0	0–3	3–1
Pittsburgh	1–2	3–0	2–1	1–2	2–2	1–2	3–0	1–2	1–2	1–2	1–2	1–2	0–3	1–2	0–3
San Diego	2–1	1–2	3–0	2–1	2–1	1–2	1–2	3–0	1–2	1–2	3–0	1–3	2–1	3–0	2–1
San Francisco	1–2	2–1	2–1	2–1	0–3	2–1	1–2	1–2	2–1	1–2	2–2	1–2	1–2	1–2	1–2
St. Louis	2–1	3–0	2–1	1–2	1–2	1–2	2–2	0–3	1–2	2–1	2–1	1–2	2–1	1–2	2–1
Washington	0–4	2–1	2–1	1–2	2–1	1–2	2–1	1–2	2–1	2–1	3–0	2–1	0–3	2–1	1–2

Updated with the results of all games through October 1, 2023.

=== Game log ===
Legend
	Nationals win
	Nationals loss
	Postponement
	Eliminated from playoff race
**Bold**	Nationals team member

2023 game log: 71–91 (Home: 34–47; Away: 37–44)
March/April: 10–17 (Home: 3–11; Away: 7–6)

#	Date	Opponent	Score	Win	Loss	Save	Attendance	Record	Streak
1	March 30	Braves	2–7	Luetge (1–0)	**Corbin** (0–1)	—	35,756	0–1	L1
2	April 1	Braves	1–7	Strider (1–0)	**Gray** (0–1)	—	27,529	0–2	L2
3	April 2	Braves	4–1	**Gore** (1–0)	Shuster (0–1)	**Finnegan** (1)	21,440	1–2	W1
4	April 3	Rays	2–6	Rasmussen (1–0)	**Williams** (0–1)	—	10,754	1–3	L1
5	April 4	Rays	6–10	Thompson (1–0)	**Finnegan** (0–1)	—	15,272	1–4	L2
6	April 5	Rays	2–7	McClanahan (2–0)	**Corbin** (0–2)	—	13,836	1–5	L3
7	April 6	@ Rockies	0–1	Freeland (2–0)	**Gray** (0–2)	Johnson (2)	48,230	1–6	L4
8	April 7	@ Rockies	10–5	**Gore** (2–0)	Ureña (0–2)	—	30,869	2–6	W1
9	April 8	@ Rockies	7–6	**Williams** (1–1)	Gomber (0–2)	**Edwards Jr.** (1)	34,503	3–6	W2
10	April 9	@ Rockies	6–7	Lamet (1–0)	**Ramírez** (0–1)	Johnson (3)	30,283	3–7	L1
11	April 10	@ Angels	6–4	**Corbin** (1–2)	Davidson (0–1)	**Finnegan** (2)	19,557	4–7	W1
12	April 11	@ Angels	0–2	Ohtani (2–0)	**Gray** (0–3)	Estévez (1)	27,390	4–8	L1
13	April 12	@ Angels	2–3	Moore (1–0)	**Thompson** (0–1)	Quijada (2)	17,780	4–9	L2
14	April 14	Guardians	3–4	Stephan (1–0)	**Edwards Jr.** (0–1)	Clase (4)	21,367	4–10	L3
15	April 15	Guardians	4–6	Plesac (1–0)	**Kuhl** (0–1)	Clase (5)	24,909	4–11	L4
16	April 16	Guardians	7–6	**Thompson** (1–1)	Sandlin (1–1)	**Finnegan** (3)	21,929	5–11	W1
17	April 18	Orioles	0–1	Kremer (1–0)	**Gray** (0–4)	Bautista (5)	18,747	5–12	L1
18	April 19	Orioles	0–4	Bradish (1–0)	**Gore** (2–1)	—	22,598	5–13	L2
19	April 21	@ Twins	3–2	**Ramírez** (1–1)	Jax (1–2)	**Finnegan** (4)	12,469	6–13	W1
20	April 22	@ Twins	10–4	**Thompson** (2–1)	López (1–2)	—	23,045	7–13	W2
21	April 23	@ Twins	1–3	Ober (1–0)	**Corbin** (1–3)	Durán (5)	14,763	7–14	L1
22	April 25	@ Mets	5–0	**Gray** (1–4)	Butto (0–1)	**Thompson** (1)	20,507	8–14	W1
23	April 26	@ Mets	4–1	**Gore** (3–1)	Senga (3–1)	**Finnegan** (5)	20,191	9–14	W2
24	April 27	@ Mets	8–9	Raley (1–0)	**Thompson** (2–2)	Robertson (5)	20,726	9–15	L1
—	April 28	Pirates	Postponed (rain); Makeup: April 29						
25	April 29 (1)	Pirates	3–6	Hill (3–2)	**Corbin** (1–4)	Bednar (9)	22,090	9–16	L2
26	April 29 (2)	Pirates	1–16	Velasquez (4–2)	**Kuhl** (0–2)	—	17,482	9–17	L3
27	April 30	Pirates	7–2	**Gray** (2–4)	Oviedo (2–2)	—	16,898	10–17	W1

May: 14–15 (Home: 8–6; Away: 6–9)

#	Date	Opponent	Score	Win	Loss	Save	Attendance	Record	Streak
28	May 1	Cubs	1–5	Smyly (3–1)	**Gore** (3–2)	—	13,722	10–18	L1
29	May 2	Cubs	4–1	**Harvey** (1–0)	Thompson (1–2)	**Finnegan** (6)	12,504	11–18	W1
30	May 3	Cubs	2–1	**Edwards Jr.** (1–1)	Alzolay (1–1)	**Finnegan** (7)	15,903	12–18	W2
31	May 4	Cubs	4–3	**Finnegan** (1–1)	Boxberger (0–1)	—	18,577	13–18	W3
32	May 5	@ Diamondbacks	1–3	Kelly (3–3)	**Gray** (2–5)	Chafin (5)	16,384	13–19	L1
33	May 6	@ Diamondbacks	7–8	Castro (1–0)	**Finnegan** (1–2)	—	27,345	13–20	L2
34	May 7	@ Diamondbacks	9–8	**Ramírez** (2–1)	Castro (1–1)	**Harvey** (1)	17,174	14–20	W1
35	May 8	@ Giants	5–1	**Irvin** (1–0)	DeSclafani (3–2)	—	20,502	15–20	W2
36	May 9	@ Giants	1–4	Webb (3–5)	**Corbin** (1–5)	Doval (8)	22,028	15–21	L1
37	May 10	@ Giants	11–6	**Gray** (3–5)	Manaea (1–2)	—	21,283	16–21	W1
38	May 12	Mets	2–3	Megill (4–2)	**Edwards Jr.** (1–2)	Smith (1)	31,904	16–22	L1
—	May 13	Mets	Suspended (inclement weather); resuming May 14						
39	May 14	Mets	3–2	**Harvey** (2–0)	Leone (0–1)	**Finnegan** (8)	24,336	17–22	W1
40	May 14	Mets	2–8	Scherzer (3–2)	**Irvin** (1–1)	—	21,507	17–23	L1
41	May 15	Mets	10–3	**Corbin** (2–5)	Peterson (1–6)	—	15,220	18–23	W1
42	May 16	@ Marlins	4–5	Nardi (3–1)	**Harvey** (2–1)	—	8,811	18–24	L1
43	May 17	@ Marlins	3–4	Cabrera (3–3)	**Gore** (3–3)	Floro (3)	8,451	18–25	L2
44	May 18	@ Marlins	3–5	Pérez (1–0)	**Williams** (1–2)	Floro (4)	7,752	18–26	L3
45	May 19	Tigers	6–8	Boyd (3–3)	**Irvin** (1–2)	Lange (8)	19,985	18–27	L4
46	May 20	Tigers	5–2	**Corbin** (3–5)	Faedo (0–2)	**Finnegan** (9)	31,721	19–27	W1
47	May 21	Tigers	6–4	**Gray** (4–5)	Wentz (1–4)	**Harvey** (2)	20,580	20–27	W2
48	May 23	Padres	4–7	Darvish (3–3)	**Ramírez** (2–2)	Hader (12)	21,438	20–28	L1
49	May 24	Padres	5–3	**Williams** (2–2)	Weathers (1–3)	**Finnegan** (10)	20,388	21–28	W1
50	May 25	Padres	6–8	Carlton (1–0)	**Harvey** (2–2)	Hader (13)	17,524	21–29	L1
51	May 26	@ Royals	12–10	**Corbin** (4–5)	Lyles (0–9)	**Kuhl** (1)	15,878	22–29	W1
52	May 27	@ Royals	4–2	**Thompson** (3–2)	Taylor (1–3)	**Finnegan** (11)	19,130	23–29	W2
53	May 28	@ Royals	2–3	Barlow (2–3)	**Kuhl** (0–3)	—	18,319	23–30	L1
54	May 29	@ Dodgers	1–6	Miller (2–0)	**Williams** (2–3)	—	47,067	23–31	L2
55	May 30	@ Dodgers	3–9	Gonsolin (3–1)	**Irvin** (1–3)	—	46,571	23–32	L3
56	May 31	@ Dodgers	10–6	**Finnegan** (2–2)	Graterol (2–2)	**Harvey** (3)	36,552	24–32	W1

June: 9–16 (Home: 2–10; Away: 7–6)

#	Date	Opponent	Score	Win	Loss	Save	Attendance	Record	Streak
57	June 2	Phillies	8–7	**Finnegan** (3–2)	Brogdon (2–1)	—	29,827	25–32	W2
58	June 3	Phillies	2–4	Covey (1–1)	**Gore** (3–4)	Kimbrel (8)	30,959	25–33	L1
59	June 4	Phillies	3–11	Suárez (1–2)	**Williams** (2–4)	—	29,546	25–34	L2
60	June 6	Diamondbacks	5–10	Ruiz (2–1)	**Ramírez** (2–3)	—	24,743	25–35	L3
61	June 7	Diamondbacks	2–6	Davies (1–1)	**Corbin** (4–6)	—	18,180	25–36	L4
—	June 8	Diamondbacks	Postponed (Air Quality/Smoke) Makeup on June 22						
62	June 9	@ Braves	2–3	Yates (2–0)	**Finnegan** (3–3)	Iglesias (9)	40,297	25–37	L5
63	June 10	@ Braves	4–6	Shuster (3–2)	**Gore** (3–5)	Minter (9)	40,799	25–38	L6
64	June 11	@ Braves	6–2	**Williams** (3–4)	Elder (4–1)	—	36,744	26–38	W1
65	June 13	@ Astros	1–6	Brown (6–3)	**Corbin** (4–7)	—	39,546	26–39	L1
66	June 14	@ Astros	4–5	Pressly (1–2)	**Harvey** (2–3)	—	39,796	26–40	L2
67	June 15	@ Astros	4–1 (10)	**Harvey** (3–3)	Maton (0–2)	**Edwards Jr.** (2)	38,303	27–40	W1
68	June 16	Marlins	5–6	Nardi (4–1)	**Edwards Jr.** (1–3)	Puk (8)	22,379	27–41	L1
69	June 17	Marlins	2–5	Garrett (3–2)	**Kuhl** (0–4)	Puk (9)	33,334	27–42	L2
70	June 18	Marlins	2–4	Luzardo (6–5)	**Corbin** (4–8)	Nardi (2)	25,339	27–43	L3
71	June 19	Cardinals	6–8	Flaherty (4–5)	**Gray** (4–6)	Hicks (3)	19,997	27–44	L4
72	June 20	Cardinals	3–9	Montgomery (4–7)	**Gore** (3–6)	—	22,223	27–45	L5
73	June 21	Cardinals	3–0	**Williams** (4–4)	Mikolas (4–5)	**Harvey** (4)	16,191	28–45	W1
74	June 22	Diamondbacks	3–5	Henry (4–1)	**Irvin** (1–4)	McGough (5)	13,251	28–46	L1
75	June 23	@ Padres	3–13	Musgrove (6–2)	**Corbin** (4–9)	—	42,510	28–47	L2
76	June 24	@ Padres	2–0	**Gray** (5–6)	Waldron (0–1)	**Harvey** (5)	43,364	29–47	W1
77	June 25	@ Padres	8–3	**Gore** (4–6)	Lugo (3–4)	—	41,503	30–47	W2
78	June 26	@ Mariners	4–8	Castillo (5–6)	**Abbott** (0–1)	Sewald (14)	23,329	30–48	L1
79	June 27	@ Mariners	7–4 (11)	**Weems** (1–0)	Gott (0–3)	—	22,671	31–48	W1
80	June 28	@ Mariners	4–1	**Corbin** (5–9)	Gilbert (5–5)	**Harvey** (6)	26,437	32–48	W2
81	June 30	@ Phillies	2–1	**Gray** (6–6)	Sánchez (0–2)	**Harvey** (7)	44,261	33–48	W3

July: 12–14 (Home: 8–6; Away: 4–8)

#	Date	Opponent	Score	Win	Loss	Save	Attendance	Record	Streak
82	July 1	@ Phillies	4–19	Wheeler (7–4)	**Gore** (4–7)	—	42,784	33–49	L1
83	July 2	@ Phillies	5–4	**Williams** (5–4)	Suárez (2–3)	**Harvey** (8)	41,531	34–49	W1
84	July 3	Reds	2–3	Weaver (2–2)	**Irvin** (1–5)	Díaz (24)	36,290	34–50	L1
85	July 4	Reds	4–8	Kennedy (1–0)	**Corbin** (5–10)	Sims (1)	30,434	34–51	L2
86	July 5	Reds	2–9	Ashcraft (4–6)	**Gray** (6–7)	—	13,252	34–52	L3
87	July 6	Reds	4–5 (10)	Santillan (1–0)	**Harvey** (3–4)	Díaz (25)	10,064	34–53	L4
88	July 7	Rangers	2–7	Bradford (1–1)	**Williams** (5–5)	—	19,322	34–54	L5
89	July 8	Rangers	8–3	**Irvin** (2–5)	Heaney (5–6)	—	29,402	35–54	W1
90	July 9	Rangers	7–2	**Corbin** (6–10)	Dunning (8–2)	—	17,547	36–54	W2
**All–Star Break (July 10–13)**
—	July 14	@ Cardinals	Suspended (rain); Resuming: July 15						
91	July 15 (1)	@ Cardinals	7–5 (10)	**Finnegan** (4–3)	Hicks (1–6)	**Harvey** (9)	42,042	37–54	W3
92	July 15 (2)	@ Cardinals	6–9	Hudson (1–0)	**Willingham** (0–1)	—	41,900	37–55	L1
93	July 16	@ Cardinals	4–8	Flaherty (7–5)	**Gray** (6–8)	—	42,626	37–56	L2
94	July 17	@ Cubs	7–5	**Gore** (5–7)	Smyly (7–7)	**Finnegan** (12)	29,383	38–56	W1
95	July 18	@ Cubs	3–17	Fulmer (1–5)	**Willingham** (0–2)	—	28,636	38–57	L1
96	July 19	@ Cubs	3–8	Merryweather (3–0)	**Thompson** (3–3)	—	28,197	38–58	L2
97	July 21	Giants	5–3	**Irvin** (3–5)	Wood (4–4)	**Finnegan** (13)	26,062	39–58	W1
98	July 22	Giants	10–1	**Gray** (7–8)	Webb (8–8)	—	32,504	40–58	W2
99	July 23	Giants	6–1	**Gore** (6–7)	Alexander (6–1)	—	23,404	41–58	W3
100	July 24	Rockies	6–10	Kauffmann (1–3)	**Corbin** (6–11)	—	17,194	41–59	L1
101	July 25	Rockies	6–5	**Ferrer** (1–0)	Lawrence (3–4)	**Finnegan** (14)	18,182	42–59	W1
102	July 26	Rockies	5–4	**Machado** (1–0)	Bard (4–2)	—	16,893	43–59	W2
103	July 27	@ Mets	1–2	Peterson (3–7)	**Thompson** (3–4)	Raley (2)	32,834	43–60	L1
104	July 28	@ Mets	1–5	Scherzer (9–4)	**Gore** (6–8)	—	25,385	43–61	L2
105	July 29	@ Mets	11–6	**Corbin** (7–11)	Carrasco (3–5)	—	30,858	44–61	W1
106	July 30	@ Mets	2–5	Verlander (6–5)	**Williams** (5–6)	Raley (3)	33,861	44–62	L1
107	July 31	Brewers	5–3	**Weems** (2–0)	Peguero (2–4)	**Finnegan** (15)	19,290	45–62	W1

August: 17–11 (Home: 8–4; Away: 9–7)

#	Date	Opponent	Score	Win	Loss	Save	Attendance	Record	Streak
108	August 1	Brewers	4–6	Peralta (7–8)	**Gray** (7–9)	Williams (27)	19,847	45–63	L1
109	August 2	Brewers	3–2	**Finnegan** (5–3)	Williams (5–3)	—	17,312	46–63	W1
110	August 4	@ Reds	6–3 (10)	**Machado** (2–0)	Díaz (3–3)	**Finnegan** (16)	39,284	47–63	W2
111	August 5	@ Reds	7–3	**Adon** (1–0)	Abbott (6–3)	—	41,059	48–63	W3
112	August 6	@ Reds	6–3	**Machado** (3–0)	Richardson (0–1)	**Finnegan** (17)	26,195	49–63	W4
—	August 7	@ Phillies	Postponed (rain); Makeup: August 8						
113	August 8 (1)	@ Phillies	4–8	Wheeler (9–5)	**Williams** (5–7)	—	see 2nd game	49–64	L1
114	August 8 (2)	@ Phillies	5–4	**Weems** (3–0)	Kimbrel (6–3)	**Finnegan** (18)	40,264	50–64	W1
115	August 9	@ Phillies	0–7	Lorenzen (7–7)	**Gore** (6–9)	—	30,406	50–65	L1
116	August 10	@ Phillies	2–6	Strahm (8–3)	**Machado** (3–1)	—	30,113	50–66	L2
117	August 11	Athletics	8–2	**Abbott** (1–1)	Blackburn (2–3)	—	22,651	51–66	W1
118	August 12	Athletics	3–2	**Finnegan** (6–3)	Erceg (2–3)	—	28,635	52–66	W2
119	August 13	Athletics	8–7	**La Sorsa** (1–0)	Snead (1–1)	—	19,240	53–66	W3
120	August 15	Red Sox	4–5	Schreiber (2–1)	**Gray** (7–10)	Jansen (28)	23,516	53–67	L1
121	August 16	Red Sox	6–2	**Ferrer** (2–0)	Whitlock (5–4)	—	26,507	54–67	W1
122	August 17	Red Sox	10–7	**Corbin** (8–11)	Sale (5–3)	**Finnegan** (19)	25,445	55–67	W2
123	August 18	Phillies	8–7	**Ferrer** (3–0)	Lorenzen (7–8)	**Finnegan** (20)	26,747	56–67	W3
124	August 19	Phillies	3–12	Domínguez (3–3)	**Abbott** (1–2)	—	38,853	56–68	L1
125	August 20	Phillies	4–3	**Williams** (6–7)	Wheeler (9–6)	**Finnegan** (21)	2,473	57–68	W1
126	August 22	@ Yankees	2–1	**Thompson** (4–4)	Kahnle (1–2)	**Finnegan** (22)	38,105	58–68	W2
127	August 23	@ Yankees	1–9	Severino (3–8)	**Gore** (6–10)	—	37,266	58–69	L1
128	August 24	@ Yankees	6–5	**Corbin** (9–11)	Kahnle (1–3)	**Finnegan** (23)	39,681	59–69	W1
129	August 25	@ Marlins	7–4	**Adon** (2–0)	Garrett (7–5)	**Harvey** (10)	12,409	60–69	W2
130	August 26	@ Marlins	3–2	**Weems** (4–0)	Robertson (4–5)	**Finnegan** (24)	13,966	61–69	W3
131	August 27	@ Marlins	1–2	Hoeing (2–2)	**Williams** (6–8)	Scott (3)	17,216	61–70	L1
132	August 28	@ Blue Jays	3–6	Gausman (10–8)	**Gray** (7–11)	Hicks (12)	27,940	61–71	L2
133	August 29	@ Blue Jays	5–4	**Gore** (7–10)	Berríos (9–10)	**Finnegan** (25)	39,722	62–71	W1
134	August 30	@ Blue Jays	0–7	Bassitt (13–7)	**Corbin** (9–12)	—	39,303	62–72	L1
135	August 31	Marlins	1–6	Garrett (8–5)	**Adon** (2–1)	—	17,428	62–73	L2

September/October: 9–18 (Home: 5–10; Away: 4–8)

#	Date	Opponent	Score	Win	Loss	Save	Attendance	Record	Streak
136	September 1	Marlins	5–8 (11)	Scott (7–4)	**Garcia** (0–1)	—	27,930	62–74	L3
137	September 2	Marlins	5–11	Cueto (1–3)	**Williams** (6–9)	—	30,389	62–75	L4
138	September 3	Marlins	4–6	Alcántara (7–12)	**Finnegan** (6–4)	Scott (4)	26,196	62–76	L5
139	September 5	Mets	5–11	Quintana (2–5)	**Corbin** (9–13)	—	22,897	62–77	L6
140	September 6	Mets	3–2	**Finnegan** (7–4)	Bickford (4–5)	—	24,297	63–77	W1
141	September 8	Dodgers	5–8	Vesia (1–5)	**Garcia** (0–2)	Phillips (22)	32,561	63–78	L1
142	September 9	Dodgers	7–6 (11)	**Machado** (4–1)	Varland (1–1)	—	34,562	64–78	W1
143	September 10	Dodgers	3–7	Suero (1–0)	**Williams** (6–10)	—	27,546	64–79	L1
144	September 11	@ Pirates	6–2	**Corbin** (10–13)	Jackson (1–3)	—	10,045	65–79	W1
145	September 12	@ Pirates	1–5	Falter (2–8)	**Adon** (2–2)	—	9,222	65–80	L1
146	September 13	@ Pirates	6–7	Priester (3–2)	**Rutledge** (0–1)	Bednar (34)	9,883	65–81	L2
147	September 14	@ Pirates	0–2	Keller (12–9)	**Gray** (7–12)	Bednar (35)	10,728	65–82	L3
148	September 15	@ Brewers	3–5	Miley (8–4)	**Irvin** (3–6)	Williams (35)	35,428	65–83	L4
149	September 16	@ Brewers	5–9	Payamps (6–4)	**Finnegan** (7–5)	—	36,212	65–84	L5
150	September 17	@ Brewers	2–1 (11)	**Garcia** (1–2)	Vieira (0–1)	—	31,865	66–84	W1
151	September 18	White Sox	1–6	Clevinger (8–8)	**Adon** (2–3)	—	20,977	66–85	L1
152	September 19	White Sox	4–3	**Garcia** (2–2)	Bummer (4–5)	**Finnegan** (26)	23,936	67–85	W1
153	September 20	White Sox	13–3	**Gray** (8–12)	Banks (0–4)	—	23,275	68–85	W2
154	September 21	Braves	3–10	Fried (8–1)	**Irvin** (3–7)	—	28,100	68–86	L1
155	September 22	Braves	6–9	Tonkin (7–2)	**Corbin** (10–14)	Iglesias (30)	36,297	68–87	L2
—	September 23	Braves	Postponed (rain); Makeup: September 24						
156	September 24 (1)	Braves	3–2	**Rutledge** (1–1)	Winans (1–2)	**Finnegan** (27)	31,989	69–87	W1
157	September 24 (2)	Braves	5–8	Strider (19–5)	**Adon** (2–4)	—	34,501	69–88	L1
158	September 26	@ Orioles	0–1	Bradish (12–7)	**Gray** (8–13)	Canó (8)	20,823	69–89	L2
159	September 27	@ Orioles	1–5	Rodriguez (7–4)	**Corbin** (10–15)	—	24,278	69–90	L3
160	September 29	@ Braves	10–6	**Weems** (5–0)	Hand (5–3)	—	41,481	70–90	W1
161	September 30	@ Braves	3–5	Strider (20–5)	**Weems** (5–1)	Iglesias (33)	41,652	70–91	L1
162	October 1	@ Braves	10–9	**Harvey** (4–4)	Tonkin (7–3)	**Finnegan** (28)	40,697	71–91	W1

== Roster ==
2023 Washington Nationals
Roster
Pitchers: 77 Cory Abbott; 60 Joan Adon; 48 Anthony Banda; 46 Patrick Corbin; 58 Carl Edwards Jr.; 30 Paolo Espino; 47 José Ferrer; 67 Kyle Finnegan; 52 Rico Garcia; 61 Robert Garcia; 1 MacKenzie Gore; 40 Josiah Gray; 75 Hobie Harris; 73 Hunter Harvey; 74 Jake Irvin; 26 Chad Kuhl; 53 Joe La Sorsa; 57 Andrés Machado; 21 Tanner Rainey; 61 Erasmo Ramírez; 79 Jackson Rutledge; 71 Mason Thompson; 68 Thaddeus Ward; 51 Jordan Weems; 32 Trevor Williams; 54 Amos Willingham	Catchers: 15 Riley Adams; 81 Drew Millas; 20 Keibert Ruiz; Infielders: 5 CJ Abrams; 39 Jake Alu; 9 Jeimer Candelario; 6 Michael Chavis; 3 Jeter Downs; 2 Luis García Jr.; 8 Carter Kieboom; 45 Joey Meneses; 22 Dominic Smith; 14 Ildemaro Vargas	Outfielders: 33 Travis Blankenhorn; 17 Alex Call; 23 Corey Dickerson; 36 Stone Garrett; 34 Derek Hill; 16 Víctor Robles; 29 Blake Rutherford; 28 Lane Thomas; 30 Jacob Young	Manager: 4 Dave Martinez; Coaches: 35 Henry Blanco (coaching/strategy); 24 Tim Bogar (bench); 25 Ricky Bones (bullpen); 7 Darnell Coles (hitting); 10 Gary DiSarcina (third base coach); 48 Jim Hickey (pitching); 87 Octavio Martinez (bullpen catcher); 66 Pat Roessler (assistant hitting); 85 Brandon Snyder (bullpen catcher); 12 Eric Young Jr. (first base coach)

== Player statistics ==
= Indicates team leader

=== Batting ===
Note: G = Games played; AB = At bats; R = Runs; H = Hits; 2B = Doubles; 3B = Triples; HR = Home runs; RBI = Runs batted in; SB = Stolen bases; BB = Walks; AVG = Batting average; SLG = Slugging average

Player	G	AB	R	H	2B	3B	HR	RBI	SB	BB	AVG	SLG
Lane Thomas	156	628	101	168	36	3	28	86	20	36	.268	.468
Joey Meneses	154	611	71	168	36	1	13	89	0	38	.275	.401
CJ Abrams	151	563	83	138	28	6	18	64	47	32	.245	.412
Dominic Smith	153	527	57	134	21	1	12	46	1	47	.254	.366
Keibert Ruiz	136	523	55	136	24	0	18	67	1	31	.260	.409
Luis García Jr.	122	447	61	119	18	4	9	50	9	27	.266	.385
Alex Call	128	375	43	75	14	1	8	38	9	53	.200	.307
Jeimer Candelario	99	368	57	95	30	2	16	53	6	36	.258	.481
Ildemaro Vargas	86	262	32	66	13	2	4	31	1	19	.252	.363
Stone Garrett	89	234	40	63	17	0	9	40	3	26	.269	.457
Jake Alu	51	159	14	36	2	1	2	16	5	10	.226	.289
Corey Dickerson	50	144	12	36	7	1	2	17	0	7	.250	.354
Riley Adams	44	143	8	39	13	2	4	21	0	11	.273	.476
Victor Robles	36	107	15	32	5	1	0	8	8	11	.299	.364
Jacob Young	33	107	9	27	7	1	0	12	13	10	.252	.336
Michael Chavis	48	91	16	22	3	0	2	5	1	5	.242	.341
Carter Kieboom	27	87	12	18	2	0	4	11	0	6	.207	.368
Derek Hill	13	47	3	8	1	0	0	1	1	3	.170	.191
Blake Rutherford	16	35	4	6	0	0	0	2	0	1	.171	.171
Travis Blankenhorn	10	31	2	5	0	0	1	1	0	6	.161	.258
Drew Millas	11	28	1	8	2	0	1	6	0	4	.286	.464
Jeter Downs	6	5	4	2	0	0	0	1	2	4	.400	.400
Totals	162	5522	700	1401	279	26	151	665	127	423	.254	.396
Rank in NL	—	4	12	5	6	7	15	12	8	15	5	12

Source:Baseball Reference

=== Pitching ===
Note: W = Wins; L = Losses; ERA = Earned run average; G = Games pitched; GS = Games started; SV = Saves; IP = Innings pitched; H = Hits allowed; R = Runs allowed; ER = Earned runs allowed; BB = Walks allowed; SO = Strikeouts

Player	W	L	ERA	G	GS	SV	IP	H	R	ER	BB	SO
Patrick Corbin	10	15	5.20	32	32	0	180.0	210	113	104	57	124
Josiah Gray	8	13	3.91	30	30	0	159.0	152	72	69	80	143
Trevor Williams	6	10	5.55	30	30	0	144.1	178	97	89	53	111
MacKenzie Gore	7	10	4.42	27	27	0	136.1	134	71	67	57	151
Jake Irvin	3	7	4.61	24	24	0	121.0	118	66	62	54	99
Kyle Finnegan	7	5	3.76	67	0	28	69.1	66	33	29	24	63
Hunter Harvey	4	4	2.82	57	0	10	60.2	44	21	19	13	67
Jordan Weems	5	1	3.62	51	0	0	54.2	38	25	22	28	60
Mason Thompson	4	4	5.50	51	0	1	54.0	62	35	33	22	44
Joan Adon	2	4	6.45	12	10	0	51.2	60	37	37	24	48
Andrés Machado	4	1	5.22	44	0	0	50.0	53	29	29	13	43
Cory Abbott	1	2	6.64	22	0	0	39.1	48	29	29	19	40
Chad Kuhl	0	4	8.45	16	5	1	38.1	47	38	36	28	31
Thaddeus Ward	0	0	6.37	26	0	0	35.1	29	26	25	28	30
José Ferrer	3	0	5.03	39	0	0	34.0	37	19	19	13	25
Robert Garcia	2	2	3.69	24	0	0	31.2	25	16	13	11	33
Carl Edwards Jr.	1	3	3.69	32	0	2	31.2	31	14	13	17	24
Joe La Sorsa	1	0	4.76	23	0	0	28.1	29	15	15	6	25
Erasmo Ramírez	2	3	6.33	23	0	0	27.0	36	20	19	6	13
Amos Willingham	0	2	6.66	18	0	0	24.1	35	18	18	9	15
Jackson Rutledge	1	1	6.75	4	4	0	20.0	24	15	15	6	12
Hobie Harris	0	0	5.12	16	0	0	19.1	21	12	11	13	9
Anthony Banda	0	0	6.43	10	0	0	7.0	9	5	5	5	6
Paolo Espino	0	0	24.75	3	0	0	4.0	14	11	11	3	3
Rico Garcia	0	0	12.00	3	0	0	3.0	6	4	4	1	4
Ildemaro Vargas	0	0	4.50	2	0	0	2.0	2	1	1	1	0
Tanner Rainey	0	0	0.00	1	0	0	1.0	1	0	0	1	1
Lane Thomas	0	0	27.00	1	0	0	1.0	3	3	3	0	1
Totals	71	91	5.02	162	162	42	1428.1	1512	845	797	592	1225
Rank in NL	13	2	14	—	—	10	12	13	14	14	12	13

Source:Baseball Reference

== Farm system ==
Level	Team	League	Manager
Triple-A	Rochester Red Wings	International League	Matthew LeCroy
Double-A	Harrisburg Senators	Eastern League	Delino DeShields
High-A	Wilmington Blue Rocks	South Atlantic League	Mario Lisson
Low-A	Fredericksburg Nationals	Carolina League	Jake Lowery
Rookie	FCL Nationals	Florida Complex League	
Rookie	DSL Nationals	Dominican Summer League	
