= Andrés Machado =

Venezuelan baseball player (born 1993)

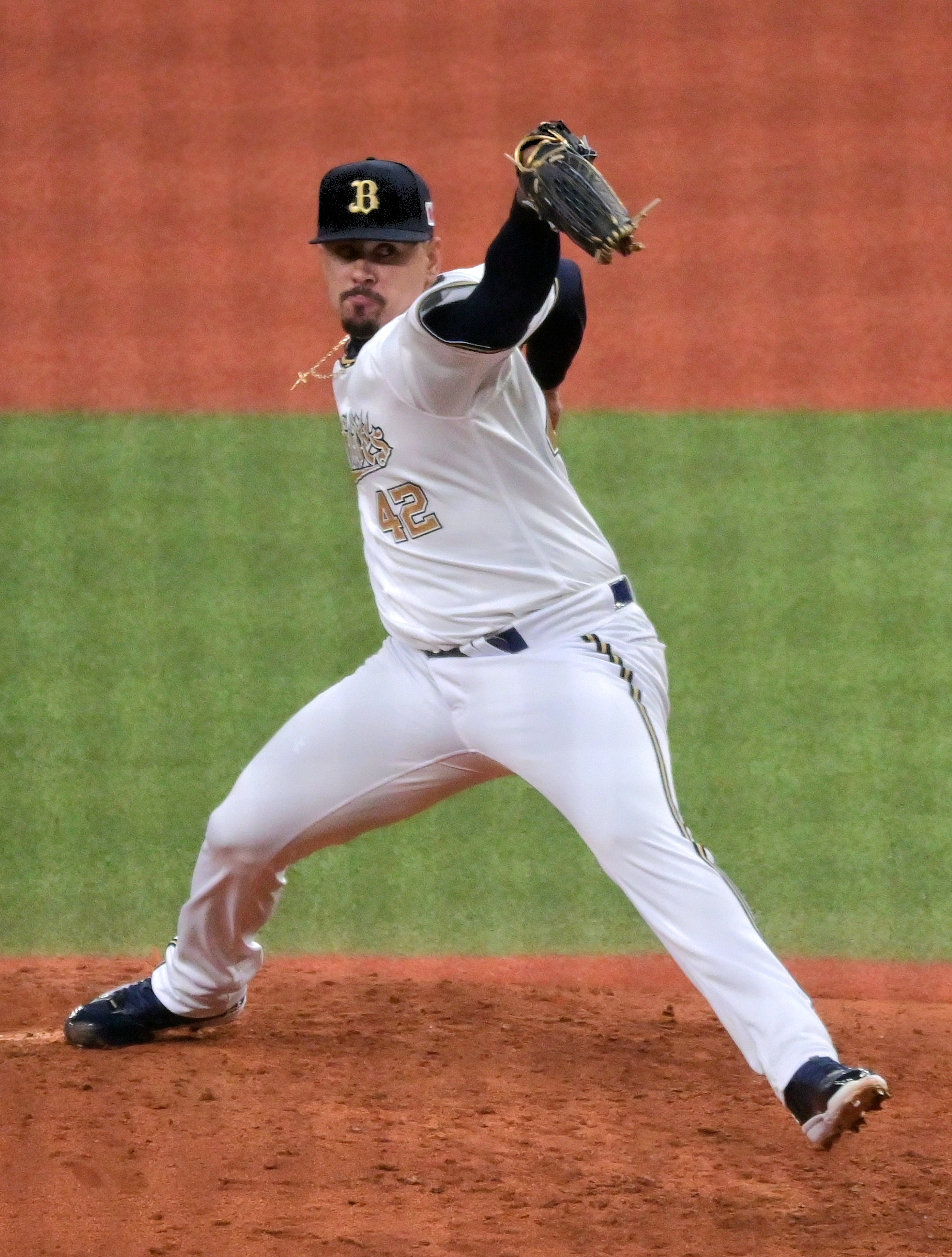
- Machado with the Orix Buffaloes in 2024

Orix Buffaloes – No. 42
- Pitcher
- Born: April 22, 1993 (age 33); Urama, Carabobo, Venezuela
- Bats: Right Throws: Right

Professional debut
- MLB: September 2, 2017, for the Kansas City Royals
- NPB: March 30, 2024, for the Orix Buffaloes

MLB statistics (through 2023 season)
- Win–loss record: 7–3
- Earned run average: 4.48
- Strikeouts: 120

NPB statistics (through August 21, 2026)
- Win–loss record: 10-10
- Earned run average: 1.93
- Strikeouts: 165
- Saves: 76
- Stats at Baseball Reference

Teams
- Kansas City Royals (2017); Washington Nationals (2021–2023); Orix Buffaloes (2024–present)

Career highlights and awards
- NPB All-Star (2024)
Medals
Men's baseball
Representing Venezuela
World Baseball Classic
Gold medal – first place	2026 Miami	Team

Andrés Eduardo Machado (born April 22, 1993) is a Venezuelan professional baseball pitcher for the Orix Buffaloes of Nippon Professional Baseball (NPB). He has previously played in Major League Baseball (MLB) for the Kansas City Royals and Washington Nationals.

== Career ==
=== Kansas City Royals ===
On November 20, 2010, Machado signed with the Kansas City Royals organization as an international free agent. Machado made his professional debut with the DSL Royals, pitching to a 4.66 ERA in 7 appearances. In 2012, Machado returned to the DSL Royals, logging a 2–1 record and 2.87 ERA in 15 appearances. He spent the 2013 season with the rookie ball Burlington Royals, posting an 0–8 record and 8.34 ERA in 12 games for the team. He returned to Burlington in 2014, and pitched to a 1–2 record and 3.63 ERA in 7 games. Machado underwent Tommy John surgery and missed the entire 2015 season as a result. He returned to the organization in 2016, and played for the rookie ball Idaho Falls Chukars, posting a 2–4 record and 3.99 ERA in 13 appearances. He split the 2017 season between the High-A Wilmington Blue Rocks, the Double-A Northwest Arkansas Naturals, and the Triple-A Omaha Storm Chasers, logging a cumulative 8–9 record and 4.54 ERA in 29 appearances between the three teams.

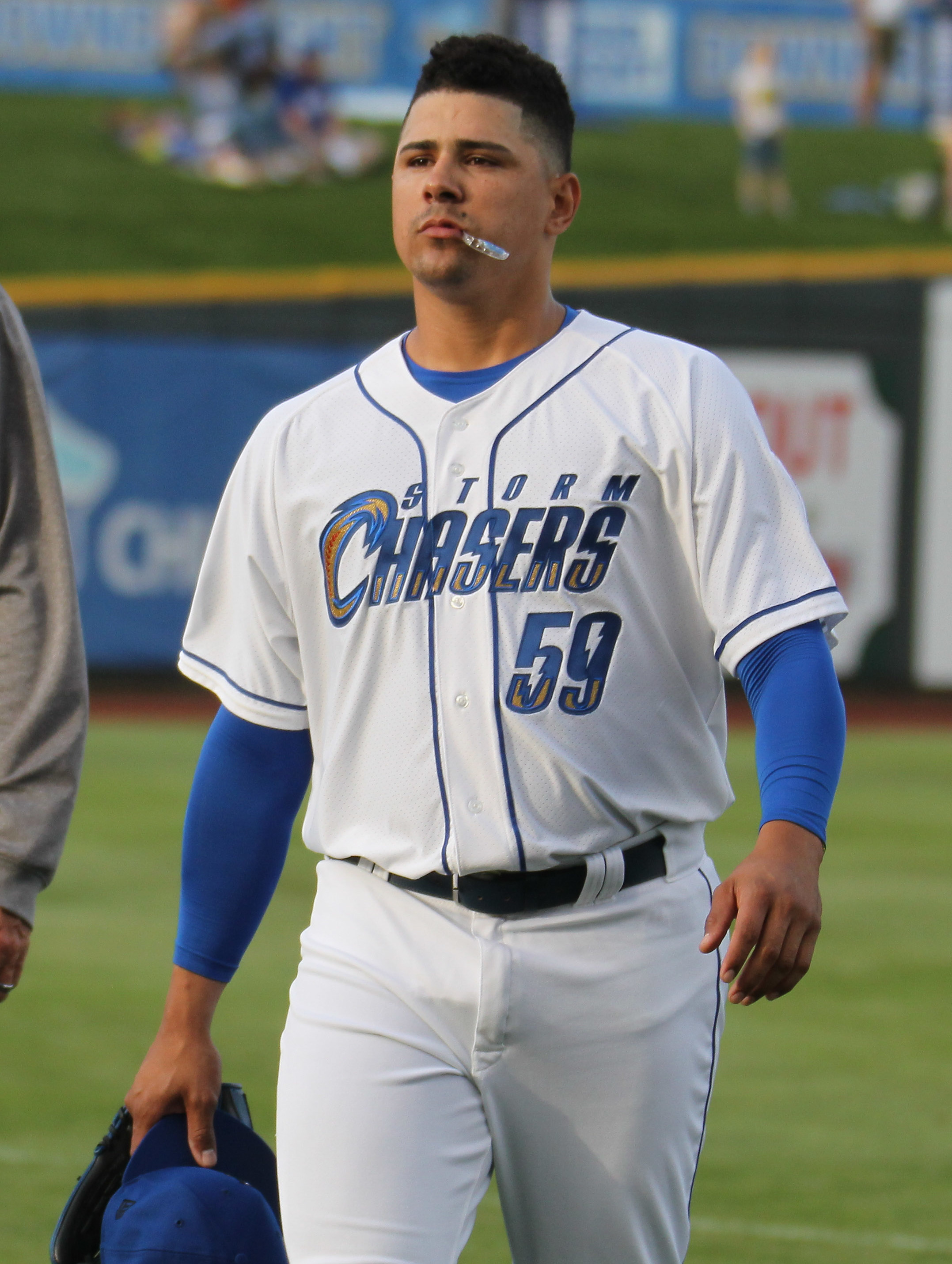
Machado with the Storm Chasers in 2018

Machado was selected to the 40-man roster and promoted to the major leagues for the first time on September 1, 2017. In his rookie season, Machado made 2 appearances for the Royals, struggling to a 22.09 ERA. Machado was non-tendered by the Royals on November 30, 2018, making him a free agent. On December 3, Machado re-signed with the Royals on a minor league contract. Machado was assigned to the Triple–A Omaha Storm Chasers to start the 2019 season, and pitched to a 3–2 record and 2.89 ERA with 65 strikeouts in 44 appearances for the team. He elected free agency following the season on November 4, 2019.

Machado again re-signed with the club on a new minor league contract on November 20, 2019. In July 2020, Machado signed on to play for the Eastern Reyes del Tigre of the Constellation Energy League (a makeshift 4-team independent league created as a result of the COVID-19 pandemic) for the 2020 season. He became a free agent on November 2, 2020.

=== Washington Nationals ===
On February 26, 2021, Machado signed a minor league contract with the Washington Nationals organization. He was assigned to the Triple-A Rochester Red Wings to begin the 2021 season, and pitched to a stellar 0.96 ERA in 7 appearances for the team. On June 12, Machado was selected to the active roster. He made his Nationals debut on June 30. Machado earned his first career win on August 7, pitching in relief against the Atlanta Braves. After working a scoreless eighth inning with the Nationals trailing by two runs, Machado was the pitcher of record when Luis García Jr. and Riley Adams drove in a trio of runs to put Washington on top in the ninth inning.

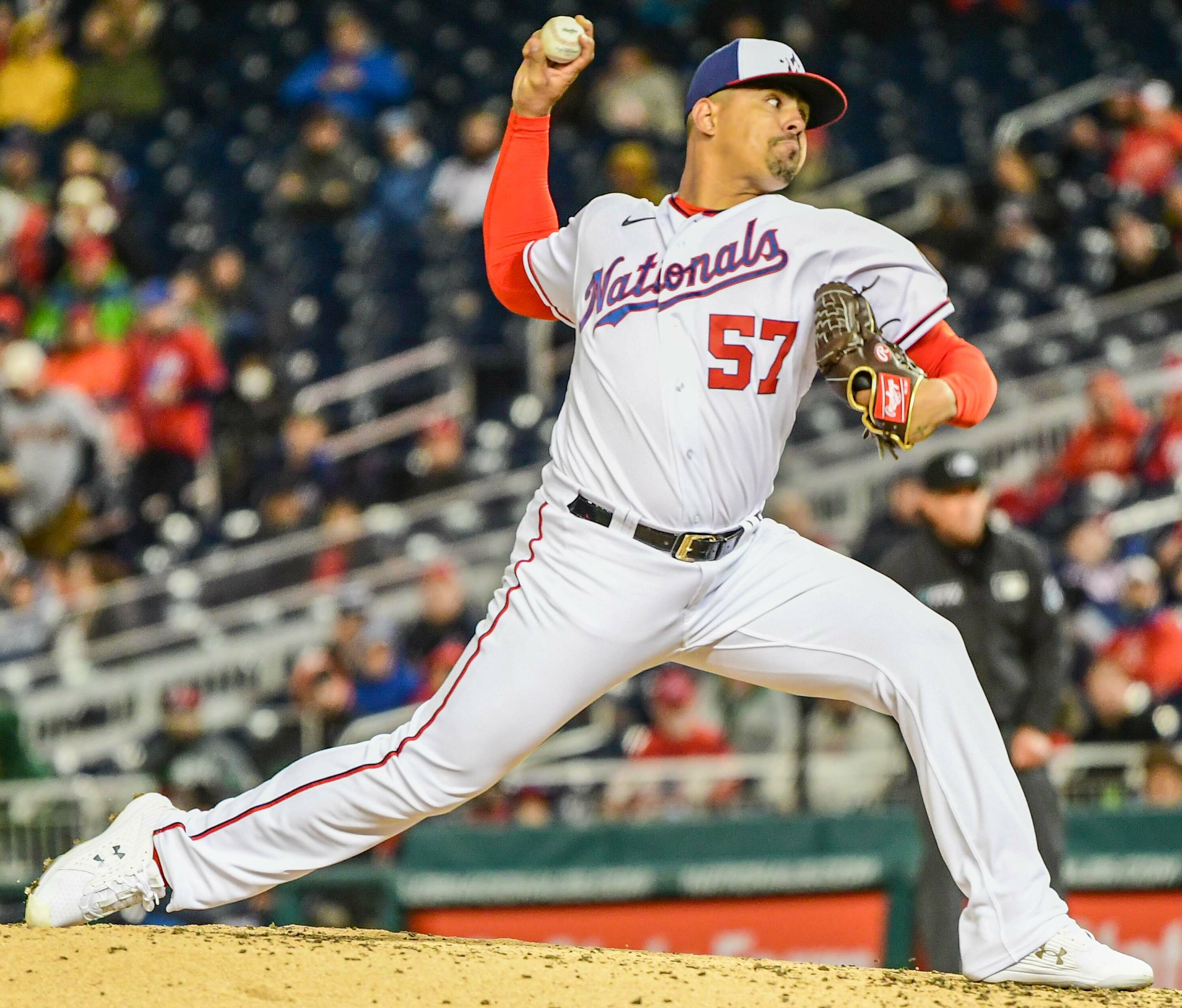
Machado in 2022

Machado made 51 appearances for Washington in 2022, recording a 3.34 ERA with 46 strikeouts in 59.1 innings pitched. He was designated for assignment by the Nationals on January 10, 2023, after the signing of Corey Dickerson was made official. On January 17, he cleared waivers and was sent outright to Triple-A Rochester. In 10 games for Rochester to start the year, Machado logged a 2.92 ERA with 16 strikeouts and 2 saves.

On April 30, 2023, his contract was selected to the active roster. In 14 appearances for the Nats, Machado struggled to an 8.47 ERA with 12 strikeouts in 17.0 innings pitched. On June 5, Machado was designated for assignment after Jordan Weems was recalled from Rochester. He cleared waivers and was sent outright to Triple–A on June 7. On July 26, Machado was selected back to the major league roster. In 44 total games, he posted a 5.22 ERA with 43 strikeouts across 50.0 innings pitched. The Nationals released Machado on November 14, in order to allow him to pursue an opportunity in Japan.

=== Orix Buffaloes ===
On November 16, 2023, Machado signed with the Orix Buffaloes of Nippon Professional Baseball.

On October 17, 2024, Machado re-signed with the Buffaloes for the 2025 season.

Machado has significantly improved in his time in Japan, adding velocity and spin to his four-seam fastball and sinker. With his contract expiring with the Buffaloes after the 2026 season, it is possible that he would look to return to Major League Baseball.

== International career ==
Machado pitched for the Venezuela national baseball team in the 2023 and 2026 World Baseball Classic. He was a key player on the 2026 team, where Venezuela won its first World Baseball Classic championship. He appeared in six of Venezuela's eight games in 2026 and pitched 6.1 innings, the most ever for a Venezuelan reliever in the WBC. Machado was inducted into the Venezuelan Baseball Hall of Fame as a member of the 2026 WBC championship team.
