= Sydney Parr =

American softball player

Personal information
- Nationality: American
- Height: 5 ft 7 in (1.70 m)
- Spouse: Evan Lee (m. 2020)

Sport
- Country: USA
- Sport: Softball
- College team: Arkansas Razorbacks (2017–2020)

Sydney Parr is an American softball player. She attended North Little Rock High School in North Little Rock, Arkansas. She later attended the University of Arkansas, where she played outfield for the Arkansas Razorbacks softball team.

== Personal life ==
Parr is married to Washington Nationals pitcher Evan Lee. The two met in college when they were both student athletes at the University of Arkansas.
