= Jeremy De La Rosa =

Dominican baseball player (born 2002)

Free agent
- Outfielder
- Born: January 16, 2002 (age 24); Santo Domingo, Dominican Republic
- Bats: Left Throws: Left

Jeremy José De La Rosa (born January 16, 2002) is a Dominican professional baseball outfielder who is a free agent.

== Career ==
The Washington Nationals signed De La Rosa as an international amateur free agent out of the Dominican Republic, where he trained at the Quality Baseball Academy, for a reported $300,000 bonus on July 2, 2018. After signing De La Rosa, the Nationals sent him to their instructional league in West Palm Beach, Florida, that fall.

De La Rosa ranked as the Nationals' twelfth-best prospect entering the 2019 season, according to MLB Pipeline. Baseball America praised his "promising tools" and ability to make contact at the plate without swinging out of the strike zone. Mark Scialabba, the Nationals' player development director, named De La Rosa as one of his breakout candidates in 2019. De La Rosa did not play in a game in 2020 due to the cancellation of the minor league season because of the COVID-19 pandemic.

In 2022, De La Rosa split the year between the Single–A Fredericksburg Nationals and High–A Wilmington Blue Rocks, playing in 101 total games and batting a cumulative .280/.358/.436 with 11 home runs, 67 RBI, and 39 stolen bases. On November 15, 2022, the Nationals added De La Rosa to their 40-man roster to protect him from the Rule 5 draft.

De La Rosa was optioned to the Double-A Harrisburg Senators to begin the 2023 season. However, he spent the year with High–A Wilmington, playing in 93 games and batting .240/.324/.361 with 7 home runs, 42 RBI, and 13 stolen bases. On November 10, 2023, De La Rosa was removed from the 40–man roster and sent outright to the Triple–A Rochester Red Wings.

De La Rosa split the 2024 campaign between the Harrisburg, Wilmington, and Fredericksburg, batting a cumulative .187/.250/.380 with 14 home runs, 56 RBI, and 14 stolen bases over 102 total appearances.

De La Rosa split the 2025 season between Harrisburg, Wilmington, and the rookie-level Florida Complex League Nationals, batting a combined .200/.281/.306 with three home runs, 18 RBI, and six stolen bases. He elected free agency following the season on November 6, 2025.
