= Evan Lee (baseball) =

American baseball player (born 1997)

Little Rock Trojans
- Pitcher / Pitching coach
- Born: June 18, 1997 (age 29); Bryant, Arkansas, U.S.
- Batted: Left Threw: Left

MLB debut
- June 1, 2022, for the Washington Nationals

Last MLB appearance
- June 17, 2022, for the Washington Nationals

MLB statistics
- Win–loss record: 0–1
- Earned run average: 4.15
- Strikeouts: 7
- Stats at Baseball Reference

Teams
- Washington Nationals (2022)

Evan Hankins Lee (born June 18, 1997) is an American former professional baseball pitcher who currently serves as the pitching coach for the Little Rock Trojans. He played in Major League Baseball (MLB) for the Washington Nationals in 2022.

== Playing career ==
Lee was a two-way player at the University of Arkansas, playing in the outfield and pitching. He was a draft-eligible sophomore when he was drafted by the Washington Nationals in the 15th round, with the 461st overall selection, of the 2018 Major League Baseball draft as a left-handed pitcher. Lee chose to sign with the Nationals, turning pro. He made his professional debut with the rookie–level Gulf Coast League Nationals. In 2019, Lee played for the Low–A Auburn Doubledays, registering a 2.65 ERA with 44 strikeouts across 34 innings of work.

Lee did not play in a game in 2020 due to the cancellation of the minor league season because of the COVID-19 pandemic. He spent the 2021 campaign with the High–A Wilmington Blue Rocks, compiling a 4–3 record and 4.32 ERA with 104 strikeouts across 21 games (20 starts). Lee was selected to participate in the Arizona Fall League in 2021, pitching in relief for the Surprise Saguaros.

On November 19, 2021, the Nationals added Lee to their 40-man roster to protect him from the Rule 5 draft. He made his major league debut as a spot starter against the New York Mets on June 1, 2022. Later that month, Lee suffered a left flexor strain and was placed on the injured list. He was transferred to the 60-day IL on August 2. Lee cleared waivers and was sent outright to Triple–A Rochester on November 15.

Lee was transitioned into a relief pitcher role entering the 2023 season. In 22 appearances out of the bullpen for the Double–A Harrisburg Senators, he struggled to a 6.45 ERA with 24 strikeouts across 22 1/3 innings pitched. Lee began the 2024 campaign with Wilmington, struggling immensely to a 60.75 ERA in 1 1/3 innings of work. He was released by the Nationals organization on April 23, 2024.

== Coaching career ==
On August 15, 2024, Lee was hired to serve as the director of player development at the University of Arkansas, Little Rock. On September 15, 2025, Lee was promoted to serve as the program's pitching coach.

== Pitching style ==
On the mound, Lee uses a four-pitch mix, although he described himself in a 2020 interview as "fastball-heavy". He also throws a 12–6 curveball, a cutter, and a slider.

== Personal life ==
Lee is married to former University of Arkansas softball player Sydney Parr. The two met in college when they were both student athletes at the University of Arkansas.
