= Yasel Antuna =

Dominican baseball player (born 1999)

- Shortstop / Third baseman
- Born: October 26, 1999 (age 26); Peravia, Dominican Republic
- Bats: Switch Throws: Right

Yasel Eneudy Antuna (born October 26, 1999) is a Dominican former professional baseball infielder.

== Career ==
The Washington Nationals signed Antuna to a minor league contract as an amateur free agent out of the Dominican Republic on July 2, 2016. They gave Antuna a $3.9 million ($5.4 million after inflation) signing bonus, the largest they had ever awarded an international free agent by $2.4 million to that point. Antuna was described by scouts at the time as a potential five-tool player who profiled as a future everyday shortstop in the major leagues.

Antuna debuted professionally in the Gulf Coast League with the GCL Nationals in 2017, appearing in games at shortstop and third base. He played in both games of a double-header on July 23, 2017, in which the GCL Nationals no-hit the GCL Marlins in both seven-inning games, committing a throwing error in the second game that accounted for one of the Marlins' two baserunners in the contest. Midseason rankings that month by MLB Pipeline ranked Antuna as the Nationals' eighth-best prospect. Antuna finished his 2017 season with a .301 batting average in the Gulf Coast League, playing mostly shortstop with several appearances at third base as well.

In August 2018, Antuna underwent season-ending Tommy John surgery. Antuna appeared in three games for the GCL Nationals late in the 2019 season, after which Baseball America ranked him as the Nationals' ninth-best prospect. Antuna was a non-roster invitee to the Nationals' 60-man player pool for the 2020 season, which was affected by the COVID-19 pandemic. On November 20, 2020, the Nationals added Antuna to their 40-man roster to protect him from the Rule 5 draft.

Antuna was assigned to the High-A Wilmington Blue Rocks to begin his 2021 campaign, alongside a number of other Washington top prospects; in 106 appearances for the team, he slashed .227/.307/.385 with 12 home runs and 65 RBI. Antuna made 125 appearances split between Wilmington and Harrisburg in 2022, batting a combined .215/.352/.338 with 11 home runs, 48 RBI, and 27 stolen bases. On December 1, 2022, Antuna was sent outright off of the 40-man roster.

Antuna split the 2023 season between the rookie–level Florida Complex League Nationals, Wilmington, and the Double–A Harrisburg Senators. In 63 games split between the three affiliates, he batted .181/.305/.293 with four home runs, 28 RBI, and eight stolen bases. Antuna elected free agency following the season on November 6, 2023.
