= Travis Blankenhorn =

American baseball player (born 1996)

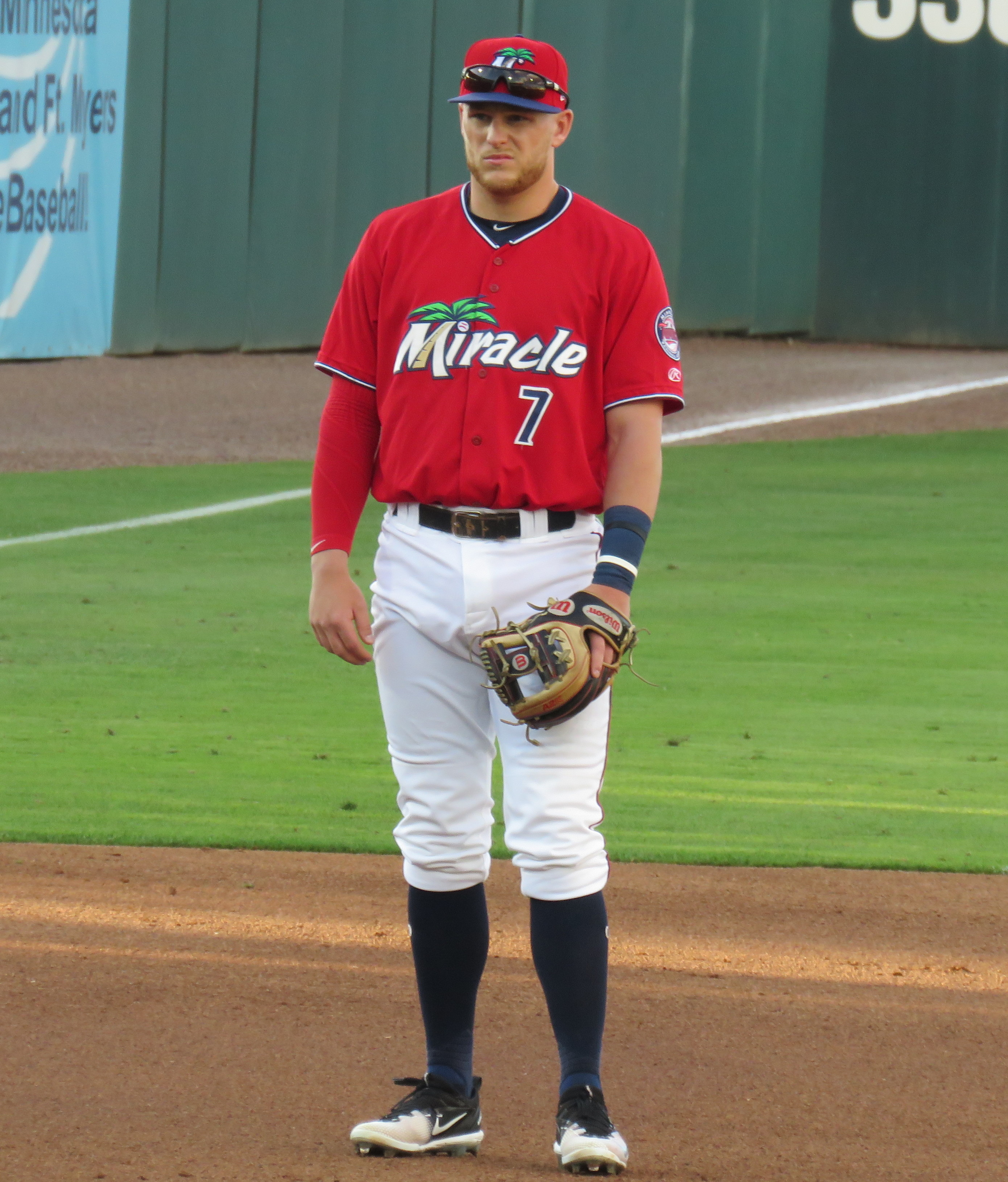
- Blankenhorn with the Fort Myers Miracle
- Second baseman
- Born: August 3, 1996 (age 29); Pottsville, Pennsylvania, U.S.
- Batted: Left Threw: Right

MLB debut
- September 15, 2020, for the Minnesota Twins

Last MLB appearance
- August 18, 2024, for the Washington Nationals

MLB statistics
- Batting average: .154
- Home runs: 2
- Runs batted in: 10
- Stats at Baseball Reference

Teams
- Minnesota Twins (2020–2021); New York Mets (2021–2022); Washington Nationals (2023–2024)

Travis Allan Blankenhorn (born August 3, 1996) is an American former professional baseball second baseman. He played in Major League Baseball (MLB) for the Minnesota Twins, New York Mets, and Washington Nationals.

== Amateur career ==
Blankenhorn attended Pottsville Area High School in Pottsville, Pennsylvania. Blankenhorn was a three sport standout high school athlete in football, basketball in baseball. He committed to play college baseball at the University of Kentucky. He was drafted by the Minnesota Twins in the third round of the 2015 Major League Baseball draft.

== Professional career ==
=== Minnesota Twins ===
After signing, Blankenhorn made his professional debut with the Gulf Coast League Twins and he was later promoted to the Elizabethton Twins. He posted a combined .244 batting average with three home runs and 23 RBIs in 53 games between both clubs. Blankenhorn spent 2016 with both Elizabethon and the Cedar Rapids Kernels where he batted a combined .293 with ten home runs and 41 RBIs in 59 games with both teams. In 2017, he returned to Cedar Rapids, slashing .251/.343/.441 with 13 home runs and 69 RBIs in 118 games, earning Midwest League All-Star honors.

Blankenhorn spent 2018 with the Fort Myers Miracle. In June, he was named a Florida State League All-Star and won the Home Run Derby with 31 home runs. In 124 games with Fort Myers, he hit .231 with 11 home runs and 57 RBIs. He returned to Fort Myers to begin the 2019 season before being promoted to the Pensacola Blue Wahoos with whom he was named to the Southern League All-Star Game. Over 108 games between the two clubs, he slashed .277/.321/.466 with 19 home runs and 54 RBIs. Blankenhorn was named the second baseman of the year in the Southern League at the conclusion of the season.

Blankenhorn was added to the Twins 40-man roster on November 20, 2019, in order to be protected from the Rule 5 draft. On September 14, 2020, Blankenhorn was promoted to the major leagues for the first time. He made his major league debut the next day against the Chicago White Sox, and picked up his first major league hit off of Matt Foster. Blankenhorn only appeared in 1 game for the Twins in 2021. On May 8, 2021, Blankenhorn was designated for assignment by Minnesota.

=== Los Angeles Dodgers ===
On May 14, 2021, Blankenhorn was claimed off waivers by the Los Angeles Dodgers. In 3 at-bats for the Triple-A Oklahoma City Dodgers, he went hitless. He was designated for assignment on May 21.

=== Seattle Mariners ===
On May 24, 2021, Blankenhorn was claimed off waivers by the Seattle Mariners and assigned to the Triple-A Tacoma Rainiers. In 20 at-bats for Tacoma, Blankenhorn notched five hits with one home run and five RBI.

=== New York Mets ===
On June 1, 2021, Blankenhorn was claimed off waivers by the New York Mets. He made his debut the following day, coming in as a defensive substitute for Jonathan Villar. On June 11, he was optioned to the Triple-A Syracuse Mets.

On July 17, Blankenhorn recorded his first career RBI and scored his first run. On July 18, in a game against the Pittsburgh Pirates, Blankenhorn hit his first career home run, a 425-foot, 3-run shot off of pitcher J. T. Brubaker. He appeared in 23 total games for the Mets in 2021, batting .174/.208/.391 with a home run and 4 RBI.

Blankenhorn was designated for assignment on April 5, 2022, after the Mets signed John Curtiss. He cleared waivers and was sent outright to Triple-A Syracuse on April 8. On July 22, Blankenhorn's contract was selected by the Mets. He was designated for assignment on July 23, and was sent outright to Triple-A Syracuse on July 25. He elected free agency following the season on November 10.

=== Washington Nationals ===
On December 14, 2022, Blankenhorn signed a minor league contract with the Washington Nationals. He began the 2023 season with the Triple–A Rochester Red Wings, playing in 108 games and batting .262/.360/.517 with 23 home runs and 75 RBI. On September 1, 2023, Blankenhorn was selected to the major league roster. In 10 games for Washington, he batted .161/.297/.258 with one home run and one RBI. On October 5, Blankenhorn was removed from the 40–man roster and sent outright to Triple–A Rochester. However, two days later Blankenhorn rejected the outright assignment and elected free agency.

On December 22, 2023, Blakenhorn re-signed with the Nationals on a minor league contract. In 94 games for Triple–A Rochester, he batted .247/.328/.518 with 24 home runs and 69 RBI. On July 30, 2024, the Nationals selected Blankenhorn's contract, adding him to their active roster. In 13 games for the Nationals, he slashed .129/.156/.161 with no home runs and five RBI. Blankenhorn was designated for assignment by Washington on September 6. He cleared waivers and elected free agency on September 9.

=== Los Angeles Angels ===
On February 13, 2025, Blankenhorn signed with the Tecolotes de los Dos Laredos of the Mexican League. However, on March 6, Blankenhorn signed a minor league contract with the Los Angeles Angels organization. He made 68 appearances split between the rookie-level Arizona Complex League Angels and Double-A Rocket City Trash Pandas, batting a cumulative .184/.289/.350 with nine home runs and 27 RBI.

On October 22, 2025, Blankenhorn announced his retirement from professional baseball via an Instagram post.

== Personal life ==
Blankenhorn and his wife, Maci, married in 2020. He has one child.
