= Hobie Harris =

American baseball player (born 1993)

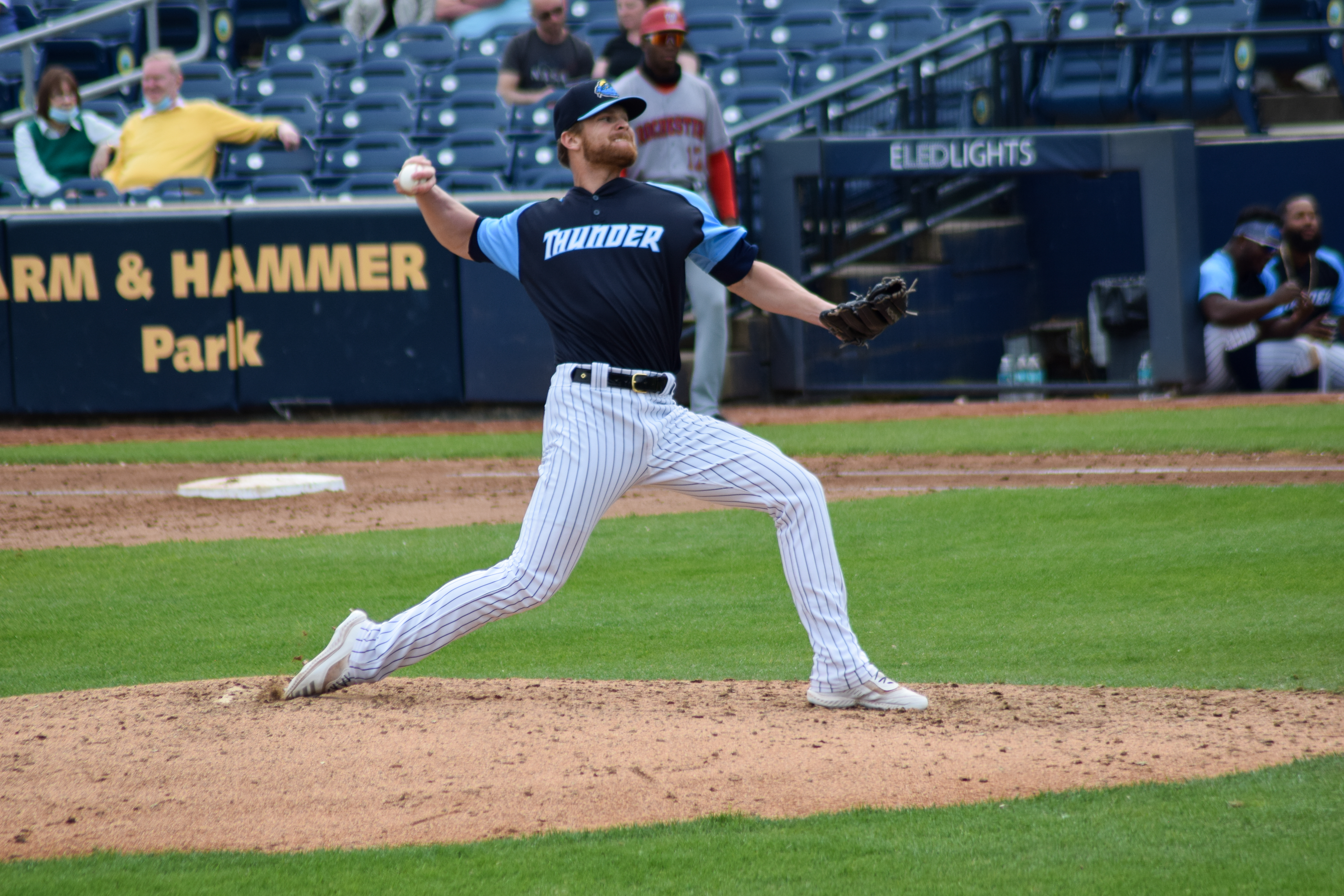
- Harris with the Trenton Thunder in 2021

Kansas City Royals
- Pitcher
- Born: June 23, 1993 (age 33); McKinney, Texas, U.S.
- Bats: Right Throws: Right

MLB debut
- April 1, 2023, for the Washington Nationals

MLB statistics (through 2023 season)
- Win–loss record: 0–0
- Earned run average: 5.12
- Strikeouts: 9
- Stats at Baseball Reference

Teams
- Washington Nationals (2023)

Robert "Hobie" Harris (born June 23, 1993) is an American professional baseball pitcher in the Kansas City Royals organization. He has previously played in Major League Baseball (MLB) for the Washington Nationals. He made his MLB debut in 2023.

== Career ==
=== Amateur career ===
Harris attended McKinney High School in McKinney, Texas, where he played baseball as an outfielder and pitcher. He enrolled at Paris Junior College to begin his college baseball career. After playing outfield and pitcher as a freshman, Harris began to focus on pitching in his sophomore year. After his sophomore year, Harris transferred to the University of Pittsburgh and played for the Pittsburgh Panthers for two years.

=== New York Yankees ===
The New York Yankees selected Harris in the 31st round of the 2015 Major League Baseball draft. He made his professional debut with the rookie-level Gulf Coast Yankees. Harris spent the entire 2016 season with Single-A Charleston River Dogs, registering a 2–4 record and 2.60 ERA with 59 strikeouts in 52.0 innings of work. He spent the 2017 season split between Single-A Charleston and High-A Tampa Yankees, posting a cumulative 3–3 record and 2.63 ERA with 65 strikeouts in 54.2 innings pitched.

In 2018, Harris played in 27 games split between the GCL Yankees, Tampa, and the Double-A Trenton Thunder, logging a 1–2 record and 2.66 ERA with 55 strikeouts in 47.1 innings of work. The following season, he made 29 appearances for Tampa, recording a 4.62 ERA and 3–4 record with 59 strikeouts in 48.2 innings pitched.

=== Toronto Blue Jays ===
On December 12, 2019, the Toronto Blue Jays selected Harris in the minor league phase of the Rule 5 draft. He did not play in a game in 2020 due to the cancellation of the minor league season because of the COVID-19 pandemic.

In 2021, Harris pitched in 42 games for the Triple-A Buffalo Bisons, logging a 5–2 record and 3.92 ERA with 51 strikeouts and 8 saves in 43 2/3 innings of work. He elected minor league free agency following the season on November 7, 2021.

=== Milwaukee Brewers ===
On November 10, 2021, Harris signed a minor league contract with the Milwaukee Brewers organization. He spent the 2022 season with the Triple-A Nashville Sounds, making 53 appearances and posting a 4/3 record and 2.04 ERA with 56 strikeouts and 8 saves in 53.0 innings pitched. He elected minor league free agency following the season on November 10, 2022.

=== Washington Nationals ===
On November 22, 2022, Harris signed a minor league deal with the Washington Nationals organization. In spring training with Washington, he recorded a 0.90 ERA with seven strikeouts in eight appearances, after which he was selected to the club's Opening Day roster. Harris made his major league debut with a scoreless inning of relief against the Atlanta Braves, striking out Marcell Ozuna as his first major league batter faced, on April 1, 2023. In 16 games out of the bullpen for Washington, he logged a 5.12 ERA with 9 strikeouts in 19 1/3 innings pitched. Following the season on October 18, Harris was removed from the 40-man roster and sent outright to the Triple–A Rochester Red Wings. He elected free agency on November 6.

=== Minnesota Twins ===
On January 12, 2024, Harris signed a minor league contract with the Minnesota Twins. He made 44 appearances out of the bullpen for the Triple–A St. Paul Saints, struggling to a 4–6 record and 6.79 ERA with 62 strikeouts and 5 saves across 54 1/3 innings pitched. Harris elected free agency following the season on November 4.

=== Boston Red Sox ===
On November 21, 2024, Harris signed a minor league contract with the New York Mets. On December 11, Harris was selected by the Boston Red Sox in the minor league phase of the Rule 5 draft. In 2025, he made 32 appearances split between the rookie-level Florida Complex League Red Sox and Triple-A Worcester Red Sox, accumulating a 1-3 record and 4.05 ERA with 45 strikeouts and five saves over 40 innings of work.

On September 22, 2025, Harris re-signed with the Red Sox organization on a minor league contract for the 2026 season. In 21 games (3 starts) between Rookie Ball and Triple-A he threw 27.2 innings going 4-1 with a 2.93 ERA with 31 strikeouts and 3 saves. He elected free agency on November 2.

=== Kansas City Royals ===
On November 6, 2026, Harris signed a minor league contract with the Kansas City Royals.

== Personal life ==
Harris has gone by the nickname "Hobie" for most of his life, a reference to the Hobie Cat line of boats. He grew up sailing with his father, also named Robert, and his grandfather. Harris is married to wife Ally.

== See also ==
- Rule 5 draft results
