= Tommy Romero =

American baseball player (born 1997)

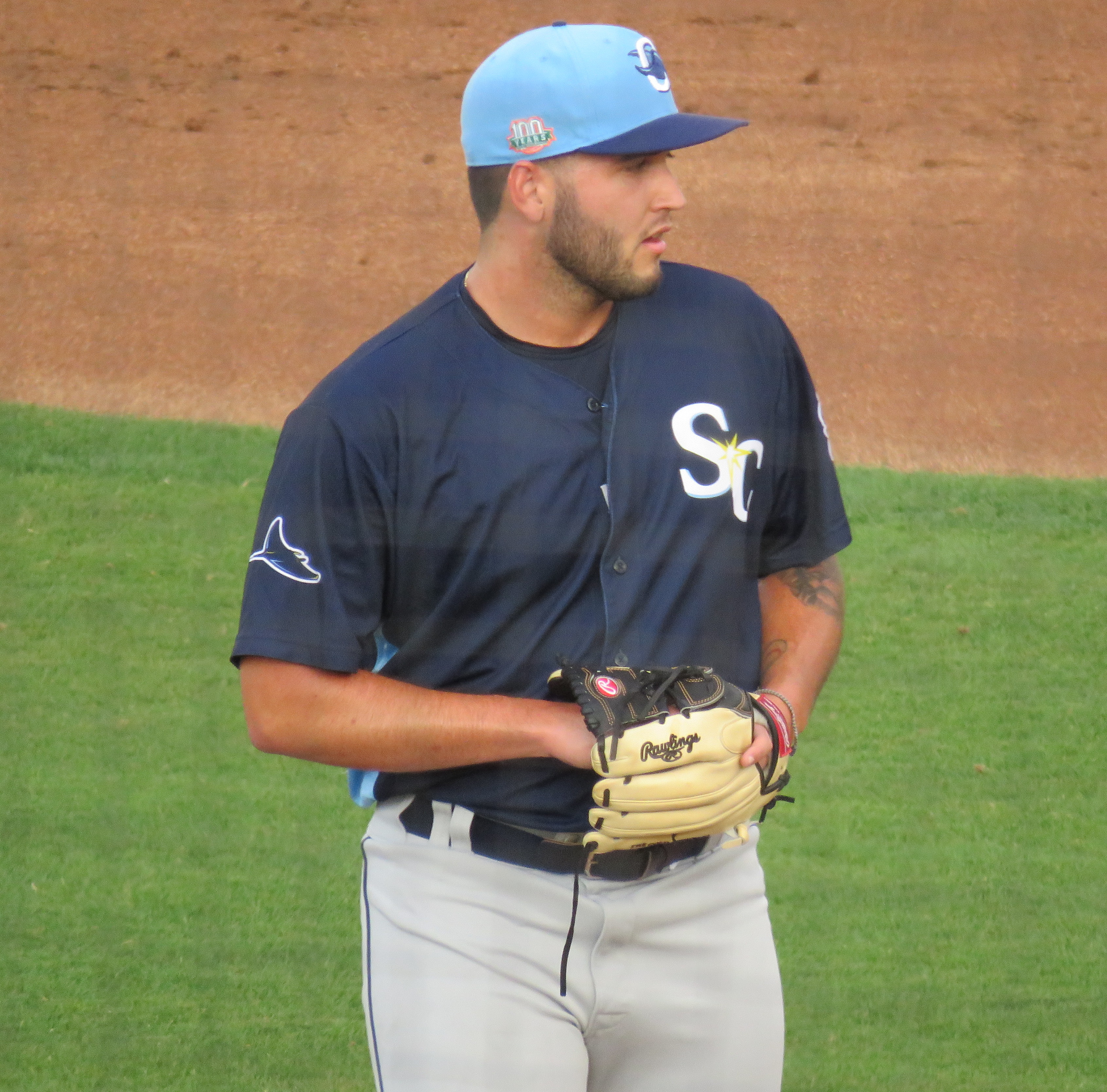
- Romero in 2019 with the Charlotte Stone Crabs

Free agent
- Pitcher
- Born: July 8, 1997 (age 29); Fort Lauderdale, Florida, U.S.
- Bats: Left Throws: Right

MLB debut
- April 12, 2022, for the Tampa Bay Rays

MLB statistics (through 2022 season)
- Win–loss record: 1–1
- Earned run average: 10.80
- Strikeouts: 7
- Stats at Baseball Reference

Teams
- Tampa Bay Rays (2022); Washington Nationals (2022)

Tommy Romero (born July 8, 1997) is an American professional baseball pitcher who is a free agent. He has previously played in Major League Baseball (MLB) for the Tampa Bay Rays and Washington Nationals.

== Amateur career ==
Romero graduated from Coral Springs Charter School in 2015. Unselected in the 2015 Major League Baseball draft, he enrolled at Polk State College where he played baseball. After his freshman year in 2016, he transferred to Eastern Florida State College. As a sophomore in 2017, he won nine games, compiled a 1.13 ERA, and led the NJCAA in strikeouts with 136.

== Professional career ==
=== Seattle Mariners ===
After his sophomore season, Romero was drafted by the Seattle Mariners in the 15th round of the 2017 Major League Baseball draft. Romero signed and made his professional debut with the Rookie-level Arizona League Mariners, going 5-1 with a 2.08 ERA in 43 1/3 innings pitched. He began 2018 with the Clinton LumberKings of the Single-A Midwest League.

=== Tampa Bay Rays ===
On May 25, 2018, the Mariners traded Romero and Andrew Moore to the Tampa Bay Rays in exchange for Denard Span and Álex Colomé. He was assigned to the Bowling Green Hot Rods of the Single-A Midwest League, with whom he was named an All-Star. In 25 total starts between Clinton and Bowling Green, he went 11-4 with a 2.95 ERA and a 1.27 WHIP. He spent a majority of the 2019 season with the Charlotte Stone Crabs of the High-A Florida State League, pitching to a 12-4 record with a 1.89 ERA over 23 games (18 starts), striking out 103 over 119 1/3 innings. He made one spot start for the Montgomery Biscuits of the Double-A Southern League at the end of the season. He did not play a minor league game in 2020 since the season was cancelled due to the COVID-19 pandemic. That winter, he played for Criollos de Caguas of the Liga de Béisbol Profesional Roberto Clemente (LBPRC). He also played for Puerto Rico in the 2021 Caribbean Series.

To begin the 2021 season, Romero was assigned back to Montgomery, now members of the Double-A South. After pitching to a 1-0 record with a 1.88 ERA and 75 strikeouts over 48 innings, he was promoted to the Durham Bulls of the Triple-A East in July. He earned Triple-A East Pitcher of the Month honors for September after going 5-0 with a 0.31 ERA over five starts. Over 12 total starts with Durham, Romero went 7-2 with a 3.18 ERA and seventy strikeouts over 62 1/3 innings.

On November 19, 2021, the Rays selected Romero's contract and added him to the 40-man roster. He returned to Durham to begin the 2022 season. After his first start, the Rays promoted Romero to the major leagues on April 12 and he made his MLB debut that night as the starting pitcher versus the Oakland Athletics at Tropicana Field. Coincidentally, the starting pitcher for the Athletics was Adam Oller, who was also making his MLB debut in the game. He pitched 1 2/3 innings, giving up three earned runs on five walks, two hits, one home run, and one strikeout. On July 14, Romero recorded his first career win after pitching a scoreless sixth inning against the Boston Red Sox. He was designated for assignment on August 23, 2022.

=== Washington Nationals ===
Romero was claimed off waivers by the Washington Nationals on August 25, 2022. He was immediately optioned to the Nationals' Triple-A affiliate, the Rochester Red Wings. On November 15, Romero was designated for assignment. On November 18, he was non–tendered by the Nationals and became a free agent.

Romero re-signed with the Nationals on a minor league contract on December 14, 2022. He made 36 appearances (10 starts) for Rochester, compiling a 5–7 record and 5.44 ERA with 82 strikeouts across 87 2/3 innings pitched. Romero elected free agency following the season on November 6, 2023.

=== San Francisco Giants ===
On January 25, 2024, Romero signed a minor league contract with the San Francisco Giants. In 19 games (8 starts) for the Triple-A Sacramento River Cats, he posted a 4-1 record and 3.14 ERA with 66 strikeouts across 71 2/3 innings pitched. Romero elected free agency following the season on November 4.

=== Guerreros de Oaxaca ===
On January 23, 2025, Romero signed with the Guerreros de Oaxaca of the Mexican League. In two starts for Oaxaca, Romero struggled to a 7.27 ERA with eight strikeouts across 8 2/3 innings pitched.

=== Chicago Cubs ===
On May 9, 2025, Romero signed a minor league contract with the Chicago Cubs. He made 18 appearances (11 starts) split between the Double-A Knoxville Smokies and Triple-A Iowa Cubs, accumulating a 3-4 record and 5.40 ERA with 58 strikeouts over 75 innings of work. Romero elected free agency following the season on November 6.

=== Guerreros de Oaxaca (second stint) ===
On April 23, 2026, Romero signed with the Guerreros de Oaxaca of the Mexican League. In seven starts for the Guerreros, he posted a 1–2 record with a 7.18 ERA, 15 strikeouts, and 14 walks in 26 1/3 innings pitched. On June 7, Romero was released by Oaxaca.

=== El Águila de Veracruz ===
On June 23, 2026, Romero signed with El Águila de Veracruz of the Mexican League. In seven appearances (five starts), he registered a 3–4 record with a 8.68 ERA, 20 strikeouts, and 16 walks across 28 innings pitched. On September 23, 2026, Romero was released by Veracruz.
