= Thaddeus Ward =

American baseball player (born 1997)

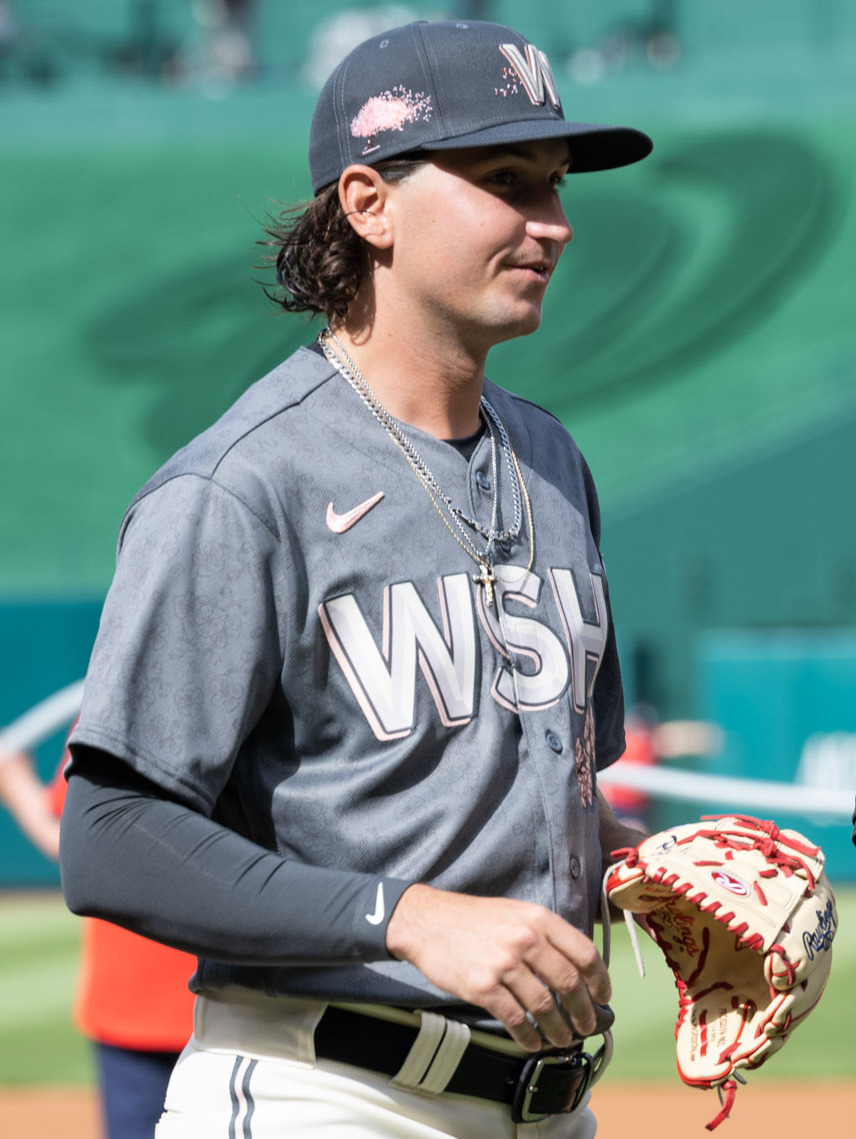
- Ward with the Washington Nationals in 2023

Kansas City Monarchs – No. 39
- Pitcher
- Born: January 16, 1997 (age 29); Fort Myers, Florida, U.S.
- Bats: Right Throws: Right

MLB debut
- April 1, 2023, for the Washington Nationals

MLB statistics (through 2023 season)
- Win–loss record: 0–0
- Earned run average: 6.37
- Strikeouts: 30
- Stats at Baseball Reference

Teams
- Washington Nationals (2023)

Thaddeus James Ward (born January 16, 1997) is an American professional baseball pitcher for the Kansas City Monarchs of the American Association of Professional Baseball. He has previously played in Major League Baseball (MLB) for the Washington Nationals. Listed at 6 feet 3 inches (1.91 m) and 182 pounds (83 kg), he both throws and bats right-handed.

== Career ==
=== Amateur career ===
Ward attended Bishop Verot High School in Fort Myers, Florida, where he was a member of the school’s baseball and basketball teams and played college baseball at the University of Central Florida. He was drafted by the Boston Red Sox in the fifth round of the 2018 Major League Baseball draft.

=== Boston Red Sox ===
Ward made his professional debut with the Lowell Spinners during the 2018 season, appearing in 11 games (all starts) with an 0–3 record and 3.77 ERA with 27 strikeouts in 31 innings. He spent 2019 with the Greenville Drive and Salem Red Sox, pitching to an overall 8–5 record with 2.14 ERA and 157 strikeouts in 126 1/3 innings. He was named the Red Sox' minor league pitcher of the year for 2019. After the 2020 minor league season was cancelled due to the COVID-19 pandemic, he was invited to participate in the Red Sox' fall instructional league. Following the 2020 season, Ward was ranked by Baseball America as the Red Sox' number 10 prospect. Ward began the 2021 season in Double-A with the Portland Sea Dogs. He made two starts, striking out 11 batters in eight innings while allowing five runs (5.63 ERA), before undergoing Tommy John surgery in early June, ending his season. Ward began the 2022 season on the injured list with Portland. He made 13 appearances on the year with various Red Sox affiliates, accumulating a 2.28 ERA with 66 strikeouts in 51.1 innings pitched.

After the season, he was selected to play in the Arizona Fall League.

=== Washington Nationals ===
On December 7, 2022, Ward was selected by the Washington Nationals with the first pick in the 2022 Rule 5 draft. Ward made the Nationals’ roster out of spring training in 2023. In 26 relief outings during his rookie campaign, he recorded a 6.37 ERA with 30 strikeouts across 35 1/3 innings pitched.

Ward was optioned to the Triple–A Rochester Red Wings to begin the 2024 season. In 28 starts for Rochester, he compiled an 8–6 record and 5.64 ERA with 107 strikeouts across 119 2/3 innings pitched.

=== Baltimore Orioles ===
On November 4, 2024, Ward was claimed off waivers by the Baltimore Orioles. On December 6, Ward was removed from the 40–man roster and sent outright to the Triple–A Norfolk Tides. He made 32 appearances (23 starts) for Norfolk in 2025, compiling a 9-6 record and 5.34 ERA with 131 strikeouts across 119 2/3 innings pitched. Ward elected free agency following the season on November 6, 2025.

=== Bravos de León ===
On March 2, 2026, Ward signed with the Bravos de León of the Mexican League. Ward made 18 appearances (including 17 starts) for León, compiling a 5–4 record and 6.75 ERA with 68 strikeouts across 70 2/3 innings pitched.

=== Kansas City Monarchs ===
On August 25, 2026, Ward signed with the Kansas City Monarchs of the American Association of Professional Baseball.

== See also ==
- Rule 5 draft results
