= Jake Alu =

American baseball player (born 1997)

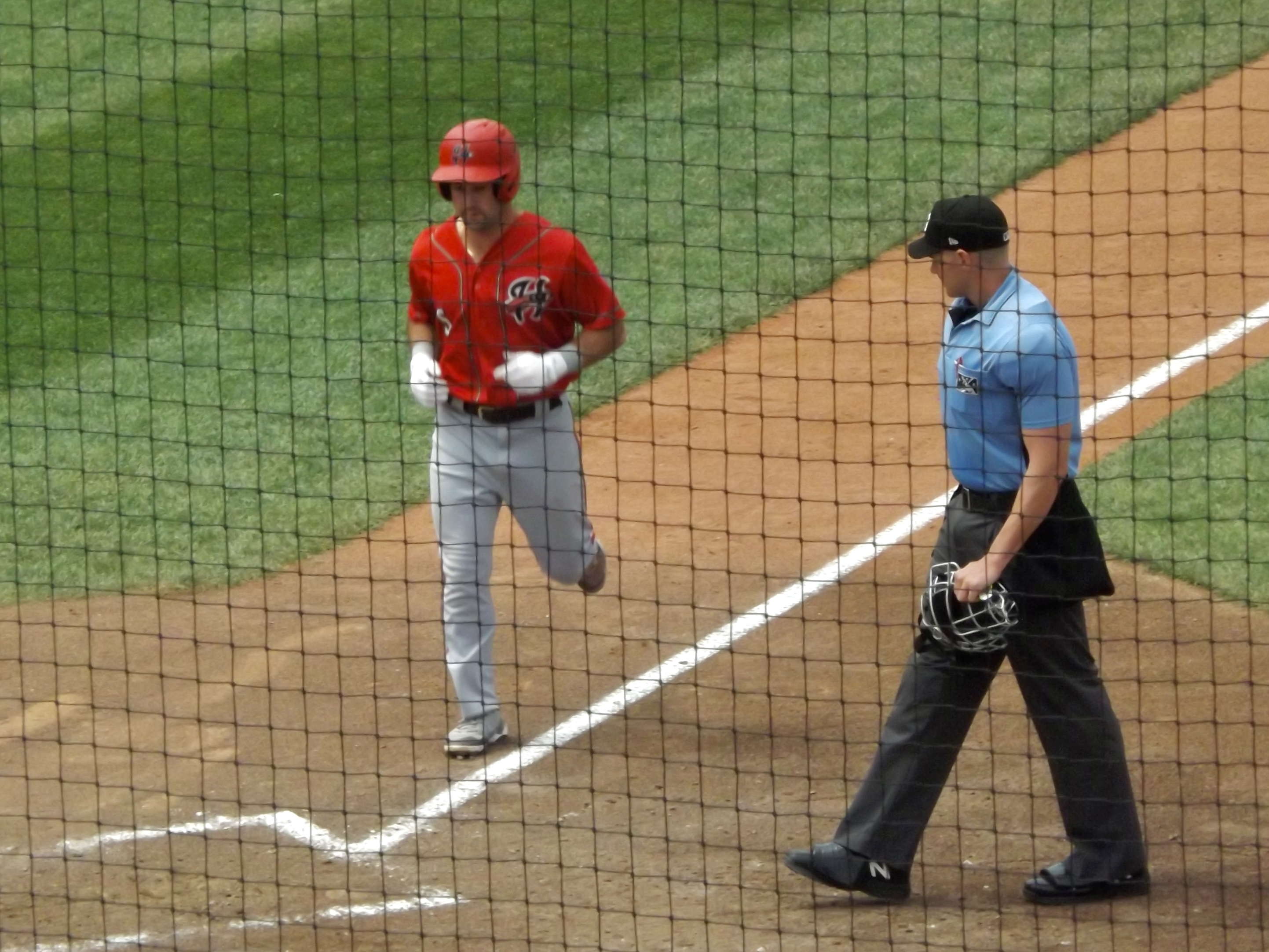
- Alu with the Harrisburg Senators in 2022
- Infielder
- Born: April 6, 1997 (age 29); Hamilton, New Jersey, U.S.
- Batted: Left Threw: Right

MLB debut
- May 9, 2023, for the Washington Nationals

Last MLB appearance
- October 1, 2023, for the Washington Nationals

MLB statistics
- Batting average: .226
- Home runs: 2
- Runs batted in: 16
- Stats at Baseball Reference

Teams
- Washington Nationals (2023)

Jacob Philip Alu (born April 6, 1997) is an American former professional baseball Infielder. He played Major League Baseball (MLB) for the Washington Nationals in 2023.

== Amateur career ==
Alu was born and raised in the Hamilton Square section of Hamilton Township, Mercer County, New Jersey. Alu attended Princeton Day School in Princeton, New Jersey. During his senior year in 2015, Alu registered .523 batting average with three home runs and 18 runs batted in (RBIs) for the baseball team. He recorded his 100th hit on April 28, 2015.

Alu enrolled at Boston College as a business major in the Carroll School of Management and played college baseball for the Boston College Eagles. In 2016, as a freshman, Alu appeared in 10 games with .500 batting average, entering as a pinch runner eight times and a pinch hitter twice. As a sophomore in 2017, he played in 48 games, making 45 starts – 29 in left field, 10 at second base, five as the designated hitter and one shortstop. That year, Alu registered .331 with 23 RBIs. In 2017, he played collegiate summer baseball with the Bourne Braves of the Cape Cod Baseball League. As a Junior in 2018, Alu registered .216 batting average with two home runs and 19 RBIs.

In 2019, Alu was named as a third team All-Atlantic Coast Conference performer at Boston College after he batted .343 with 40 RBIs. The same year, Alu also played in Atlantic Coast Conference baseball tournament. He graduated in 2019 with a degree in business management.

== Professional career ==
The Washington Nationals selected Alu in the 24th round, with the 723rd overall selection, of the 2019 Major League Baseball draft. He signed and was assigned to the Low-A Auburn Doubledays of the New York–Penn League. In 45 games for Auburn, Alu slashed .257/.290/.340 with one home run and 25 RBI. Alu did not play in a game in 2020 due to the cancellation of the minor league season because of the COVID-19 pandemic.

Alu returned to action in 2021, playing in 96 games split between the High-A Wilmington Blue Rocks and Double-A Harrisburg Senators. On the year, he hit a cumulative .281/.332/.444 with 10 home runs, 42 RBI, and 13 stolen bases. He spent the 2022 season playing for Harrisburg and the Triple-A Rochester Red Wings. In 132 total games, Alu batted .299/.365/.506 with career-highs in home runs (20), RBI (81), and stolen bases (15).

On November 15, 2022, the Nationals selected Alu to the 40-man roster to protect him from the Rule 5 draft. Alu was optioned to the Triple-A Rochester Red Wings to begin the 2023 season. In 20 games for Rochester, he hit .240/.318/.333 with one home run, 9 RBI, and 3 stolen bases.

On May 7, 2023, the Nationals promoted Alu to the major leagues for the first time. In 51 games during his rookie campaign, he batted .226/.282/.289 with 2 home runs, 16 RBI, and 5 stolen bases.

Alu was optioned to Triple–A Rochester to begin the 2024 season. On April 23, 2024, he was designated for assignment by the Nationals. He cleared waivers and was sent outright to Triple–A Rochester on April 28. In 69 appearance split between Rochester and the rookie-level Florida Complex League Nationals, Alu batted a combined .250/.318/.353 with three home runs, 30 RBI, and nine stolen bases. Alu retired from professional baseball on January 16, 2025.

== Personal life ==
Alu is the son of Phil and Judy Alu. He has an older sister named Danielle. His father played soccer at the College of New Jersey and Elizabethtown College.
