= Amos Willingham =

American baseball player (born 1998)

Free agent
- Pitcher
- Born: August 21, 1998 (age 28); Rome, Georgia, U.S.
- Bats: Right Throws: Right

MLB debut
- June 28, 2023, for the Washington Nationals

MLB statistics (through 2024 season)
- Win–loss record: 0–2
- Earned run average: 7.11
- Strikeouts: 16
- Stats at Baseball Reference

Teams
- Washington Nationals (2023–2024)

Amos Lee Willingham (born August 21, 1998) is an American professional baseball pitcher who is a free agent. He has previously played in Major League Baseball (MLB) for the Washington Nationals.

== Career ==
=== Washington Nationals ===
The Washington Nationals selected Willingham in the 17th round, with the 513th overall selection, of the 2019 Major League Baseball draft. He made his professional debut with the Low–A Auburn Doubledays, pitching to a 3.67 ERA with 18 strikeouts across 12 appearances. Willingham did not play in a game in 2020 due to the cancellation of the minor league season because of the COVID-19 pandemic.

He returned to action in 2021, beginning the season with the Single–A Fredericksburg Nationals. On August 14, 2021, Willingham combined with Gilberto Chu and Leif Strom to no–hit the Salem Red Sox, the first no-hitter thrown in Fredericksburg history. He posted a 2.28 ERA in 23 games for Fredericksburg, and was briefly promoted to the High–A Wilmington Blue Rocks. In 6 contests for Wilmington, Willingham struggled to a 14.54 ERA with 14 strikeouts and 6 walks across 13.0 innings, and was returned to Fredericksburg shortly thereafter.

Willingham spent the 2022 season with High–A Wilmington, making 29 appearances and registering a 3.41 ERA with 40 strikeouts and 3 saves in 34 1/3 innings pitched. He began the 2023 season with the Double–A Harrisburg Senators, and logged 14 strikeouts and 5 saves in 10 2/3 scoreless innings pitched across 10 contests. On May 14, 2023, Willingham was promoted to the Triple–A Rochester Red Wings. In 10 games with Rochester, he recorded a 3.46 ERA with 11 strikeouts in 13.0 innings of work.

On June 26, 2023, Willingham was selected to the 40-man roster and promoted to the major leagues for the first time. In 18 appearances during his rookie campaign, he struggled to a 6.66 ERA with 15 strikeouts across 24 1/3 innings pitched.

Willingham was optioned to Triple–A Rochester to begin the 2024 season. He made one appearance for Washington in 2024, allowing two runs in one inning of relief against the Milwaukee Brewers. On January 11, 2025, Willingham was designated for assignment by the Nationals.

=== Atlanta Braves ===
On January 17, 2025, Willingham was claimed off waivers by the Atlanta Braves. He was optioned to the Triple-A Gwinnett Stripers to begin the 2025 season. After two appearances for Gwinnett, Willingham was released by the Braves on April 22, following the promotion of Nathan Wiles. He re-signed with the Braves on a minor league contract the following day. Willingham elected free agency following the season on November 6.

=== Houston Astros ===
On November 28, 2025, Willingham signed a minor league contract with the Houston Astros. He made 11 appearances for the Triple-A Sugar Land Space Cowboys, compiling an 0-1 record and 3.38 ERA with nine strikeouts across four appearances 13 1/3 innings pitched. On May 6, 2026, Willingham was released by the Astros organization.

=== Miami Marlins ===
On May 28, 2026, Willingham signed a minor league contract with the Miami Marlins organization. In 26 games (1 start) he threw 39.2 innings going 1-4 with a 5.45 ERA with 38 strikeouts and one save. He elected free agency on November 2.
