= Mason Thompson =

American baseball player (born 1998)

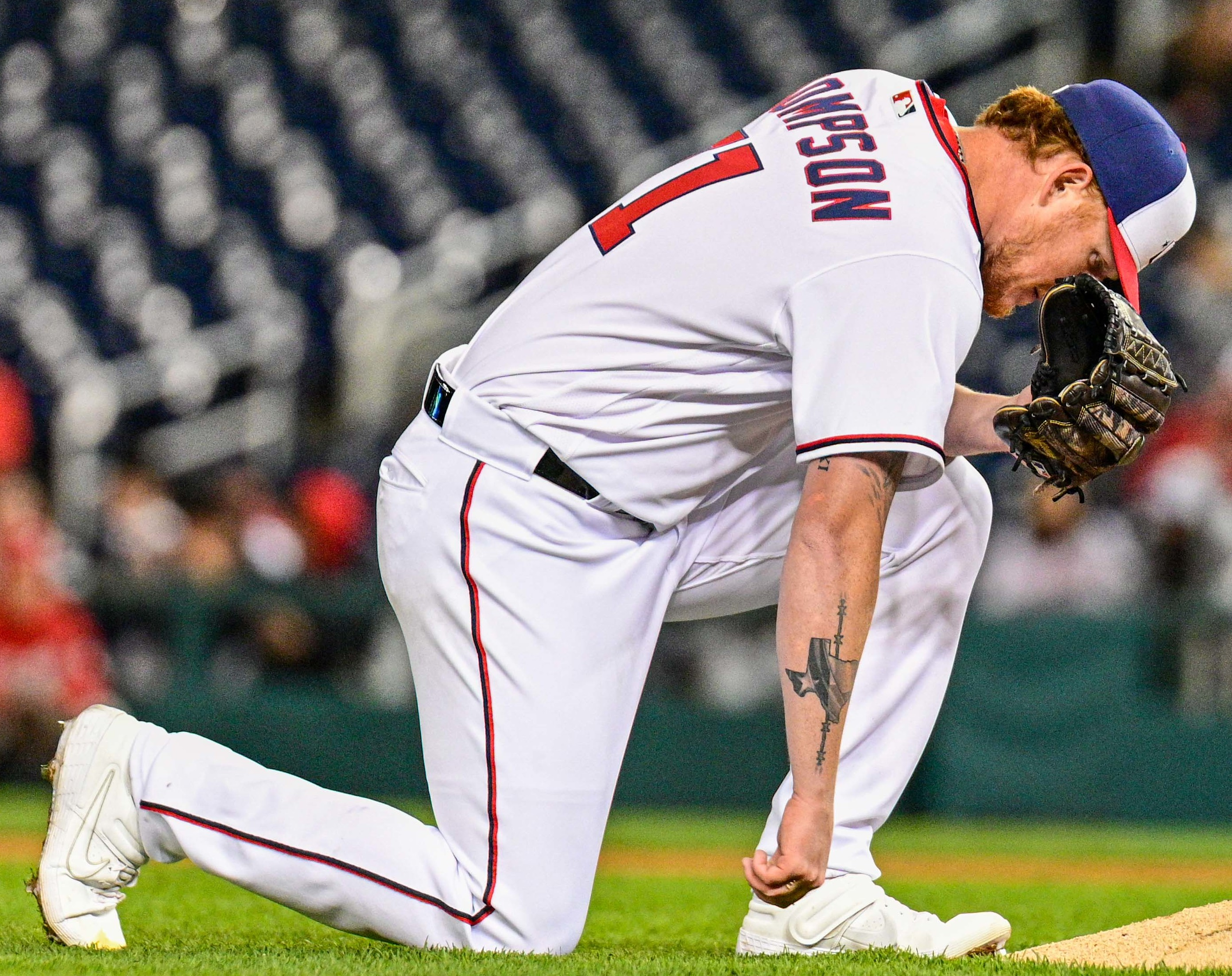
- Thompson with the Washington Nationals in 2022

Free agent
- Pitcher
- Born: February 20, 1998 (age 28); Round Rock, Texas, U.S.
- Bats: Right Throws: Right

MLB debut
- June 22, 2021, for the San Diego Padres

MLB statistics (through 2025 season)
- Win–loss record: 7–9
- Earned run average: 5.21
- Strikeouts: 93
- Stats at Baseball Reference

Teams
- San Diego Padres (2021); Washington Nationals (2021–2023, 2025)

Mason Lane Thompson (born February 20, 1998) is an American professional baseball pitcher who is a free agent. He has previously played in Major League Baseball (MLB) for the San Diego Padres and Washington Nationals.

== Amateur career ==
Thompson attended Round Rock High School in Round Rock, Texas. He underwent Tommy John surgery as a junior, and pitched only one inning as a senior. He was selected by the San Diego Padres in the third round, 85th overall, of the 2016 Major League Baseball draft. He signed for $1.75 million, forgoing his commitment to play college baseball for the Texas Longhorns.

== Professional career ==
=== San Diego Padres ===
Thompson made his professional debut with the Arizona League Padres, tossing 12 innings of 2.25 ERA ball. In 2017, Thompson played for the Single-A Fort Wayne TinCaps, posting a 2-4 record and 4.67 ERA in seven appearances. He returned to Fort Wayne for the 2018 season, pitching to a 6-8 record and 4.94 ERA with 97 strikeouts in 93 innings of work. In 2019, Thompson played for the High-A Lake Elsinore Storm, only appearing in seven games due to injury, and recorded an 0-5 record and 7.66 ERA. Thompson did not play in a game in 2020 due to the cancellation of the minor league season because of the COVID-19 pandemic. The Padres added him to their 40-man roster after the 2020 season.

On June 20, 2021, Thompson was promoted to the major leagues for the first time. He made his MLB debut on June 22, pitching one-third of an inning against the Los Angeles Dodgers, and earning a hold.

=== Washington Nationals ===
On July 30, 2021, Thompson and Jordy Barley were traded to the Washington Nationals in exchange for Daniel Hudson. He was activated the next day and made his Nationals debut on August 2. In 27 relief appearances, he posted a 4.15 ERA with 21 strikeouts across 21 2/3 innings of work.

On April 10, 2022, Thompson was placed on the injured list due to a biceps injury. He was transferred to the 60-day IL on May 10 with biceps tendinitis. He was activated on July 1. On September 5, he earned his first major league save by pitching the final three scoreless innings against the St. Louis Cardinals in a 6-0 Nationals win in St. Louis. In 24 games, Thompson recorded a 2.92 ERA with 15 strikeouts and one save. In 2023, Thompson made 51 relief appearances for Washington, registering a 5.50 ERA with 44 strikeouts across 54 innings of work.

On February 28, 2024, it was announced that Thompson would require Tommy John surgery, ending his season prematurely. He was activated from the injured list to make his return from surgery on July 5, 2025. In 14 appearances for the Nationals, Thompson struggled to an 11.81 ERA and 1-1 record with 11 strikeouts across 10 2/3 innings pitched. On September 23, Thompson was placed on the injured list due to right biceps tendinitis, ending his season. On October 29, Thompson was removed from the 40-man roster and sent outright to Rochester; he subsequently rejected the assignment and elected free agency.

=== Texas Rangers ===
On February 3, 2026, Thompson signed a minor league contract with the Texas Rangers. He made 39 appearances (including three starts) for the Triple–A Round Rock Express, compiling a 5–3 record and 5.67 ERA with 40 strikeouts and four saves across 39 2/3 innings pitched. Thompson was released by the Rangers organization on August 18.
