= Riley Adams =

American baseball player (born 1996)

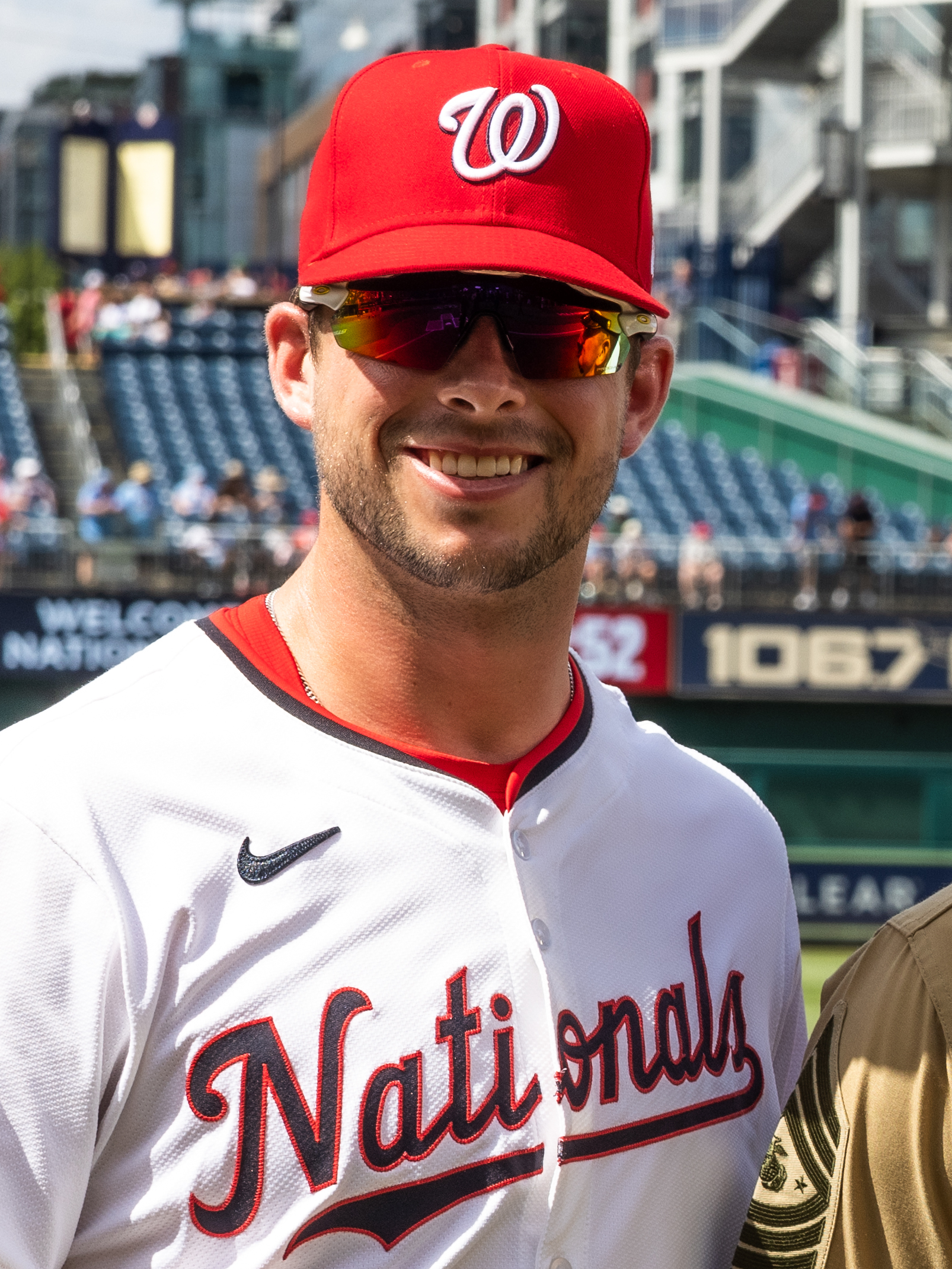
- Adams with the Washington Nationals in 2024

Boston Red Sox
- Catcher
- Born: June 26, 1996 (age 30); Encinitas, California, U.S.
- Bats: Right Throws: Right

MLB debut
- June 8, 2021, for the Toronto Blue Jays

MLB statistics (through 2025 season)
- Batting average: .211
- Home runs: 21
- Runs batted in: 73
- Stats at Baseball Reference

Teams
- Toronto Blue Jays (2021); Washington Nationals (2021–2025)

Riley Keaton Adams (born June 26, 1996) is an American professional baseball catcher in the Boston Red Sox organization. He has previously played in Major League Baseball (MLB) for the Toronto Blue Jays and Washington Nationals. He played college baseball for the San Diego Toreros of the University of San Diego.

== High school and college ==
Adams was born on June 26, 1996, in Encinitas, California. He attended Canyon Crest Academy in San Diego, California. There he was a two-sport athlete, playing basketball and baseball. In basketball, Adams once recorded 31 rebounds in one game. In baseball, he made the school's varsity baseball team in his freshman year as a shortstop. He switched to catcher as a sophomore, when his coach asked him to move to fill the open position. The Chicago Cubs selected Adams in the 37th round, with the 1,099th overall selection, of the 2014 Major League Baseball draft, but he did not sign so that he could enroll at the University of San Diego.

Adams played college baseball for the San Diego Toreros. In the summer of 2016, he played collegiate summer baseball for the Orleans Firebirds of the Cape Cod Baseball League, and was named a league all-star. Adams was twice named a semifinalist for the Johnny Bench Award. As a junior in 2017, he won the West Coast Conference Player of the Year Award, and finished his collegiate career with a .305 batting average, 24 home runs, and 110 runs batted in in 159 games played.

== Professional career ==
=== Toronto Blue Jays ===
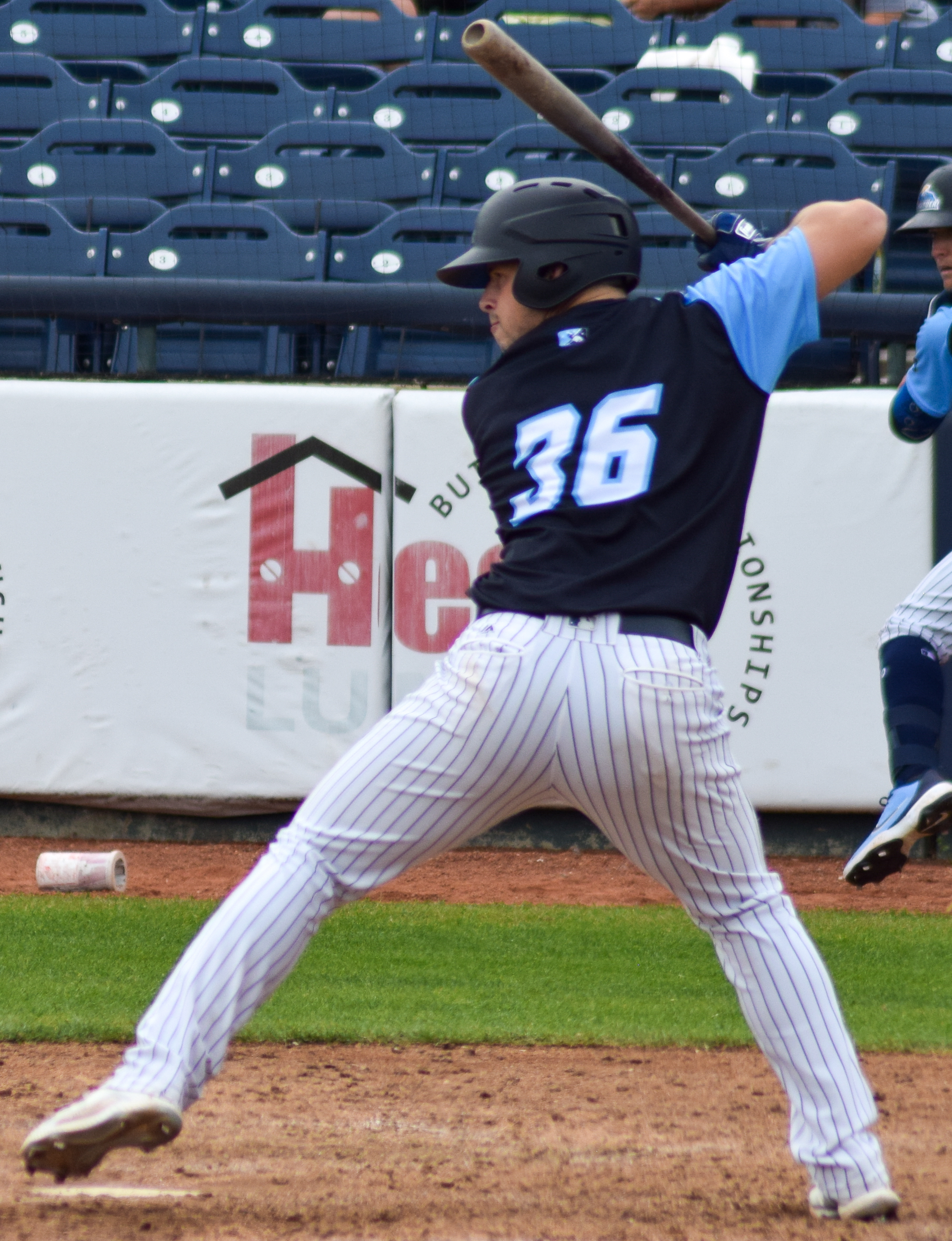
Adams with the Buffalo Bisons in 2021

The Toronto Blue Jays selected Adams in the third round of the 2017 Major League Baseball draft, with the 99th overall selection. They signed him to a contract with a $542,000 signing bonus. Adams made his professional debut with the Vancouver Canadians of the Low-A Northwest League, and went on to start in the Northwest / Pioneer League All-Star Game. Adams played in 52 games for the Canadians in 2017, and hit .305 with three home runs and 35 RBI.

In 2018, Adams played for the Dunedin Blue Jays of the High-A Florida State League where he slashed .246/.352/.361 with four home runs and 43 RBI in 99 games. In 2019 he appeared in 81 games for the Double-A New Hampshire Fisher Cats, hitting .258 with 11 home runs.

Adams did not play in a game in 2020 due to the cancellation of the Minor League Baseball season because of the COVID-19 pandemic. He was added to the Blue Jays' 60-man player pool for the 2020 season but did not get called up. On November 20, 2020, Adams was added to the 40-man roster.

On May 2, 2021, Adams was promoted to the major leagues for the first time after backup catcher Alejandro Kirk was placed on the 10-day injured list with left hip flexor discomfort. On May 5, Adams was optioned to Triple-A without making a major league appearance. On June 8, Adams was again recalled to the active roster. He made his MLB debut that day as the starting catcher against the Chicago White Sox. In the game, he notched his first career hit, a double off of White Sox starter Carlos Rodón.

=== Washington Nationals ===
Adams was traded to the Washington Nationals for reliever Brad Hand on July 29, 2021. He notched his first hit as a National, as well as his first career home run and RBI, off Atlanta Braves reliever Will Smith in the ninth inning, giving his team the late lead, on August 7. In 35 games down the stretch, Adams hit .268 with two home runs and 10 RBI. Adams made 48 appearances for the Nationals during the 2022 campaign, slashing .176/.245/.310 with a career-high five home runs and 10 RBI.

In 2023, Adams played in 44 games for Washington, batting .273/.331/.476 with 4 home runs and 21 RBI. On September 8, 2023, Adams was diagnosed with a fractured hamate bone in his left wrist. On September 11, he underwent surgery for the injury, ending his season.

Adams started the 2024 season on the major league roster, but was optioned to the Triple-A Rochester Red Wings on June 2. Adams was sent down to get more playing time as both a catcher and a first baseman, rather than being limited to a backup role behind Nationals starting catcher Keibert Ruiz. He eventually played in 41 games with the Nationals in 2024, batting .224/.292/.336 with two home runs and eight RBI.

In 2025, Adams got significantly more playing time, after a series of concussions kept Ruiz out of play. Adams played in 83 games for the team, and slashed .186/.252/.308, with eight home runs and 24 RBI.

Adams was designated for assignment by Washington on January 22, 2026. He cleared waivers and was sent outright to the Triple-A Rochester Red Wings on January 28. In 82 games with Triple-A Rochester Red Wings he batted .273/.389/.506 with 16 home runs, 50 RBIs and one stolen base. He elected free agency on September 29.

=== Boston Red Sox ===
On October 22, 2026, Adams signed a minor league contract with the Boston Red Sox.

== Personal life ==
Adams began practicing karate at the age of three. He earned a second degree black belt when he was 13 years old, and then began to focus on his baseball career. His elder brother, Cameron, played college baseball at Washington University in St. Louis.

Adams was an accomplished science fair competitor, notably for his studies of pampas grass which resulted in his participation in the California State Science Fair. Adams was also a standout high school basketball player, earning All League honors as a sophomore, junior and senior.
