= Jordan Weems =

American baseball player (born 1992)

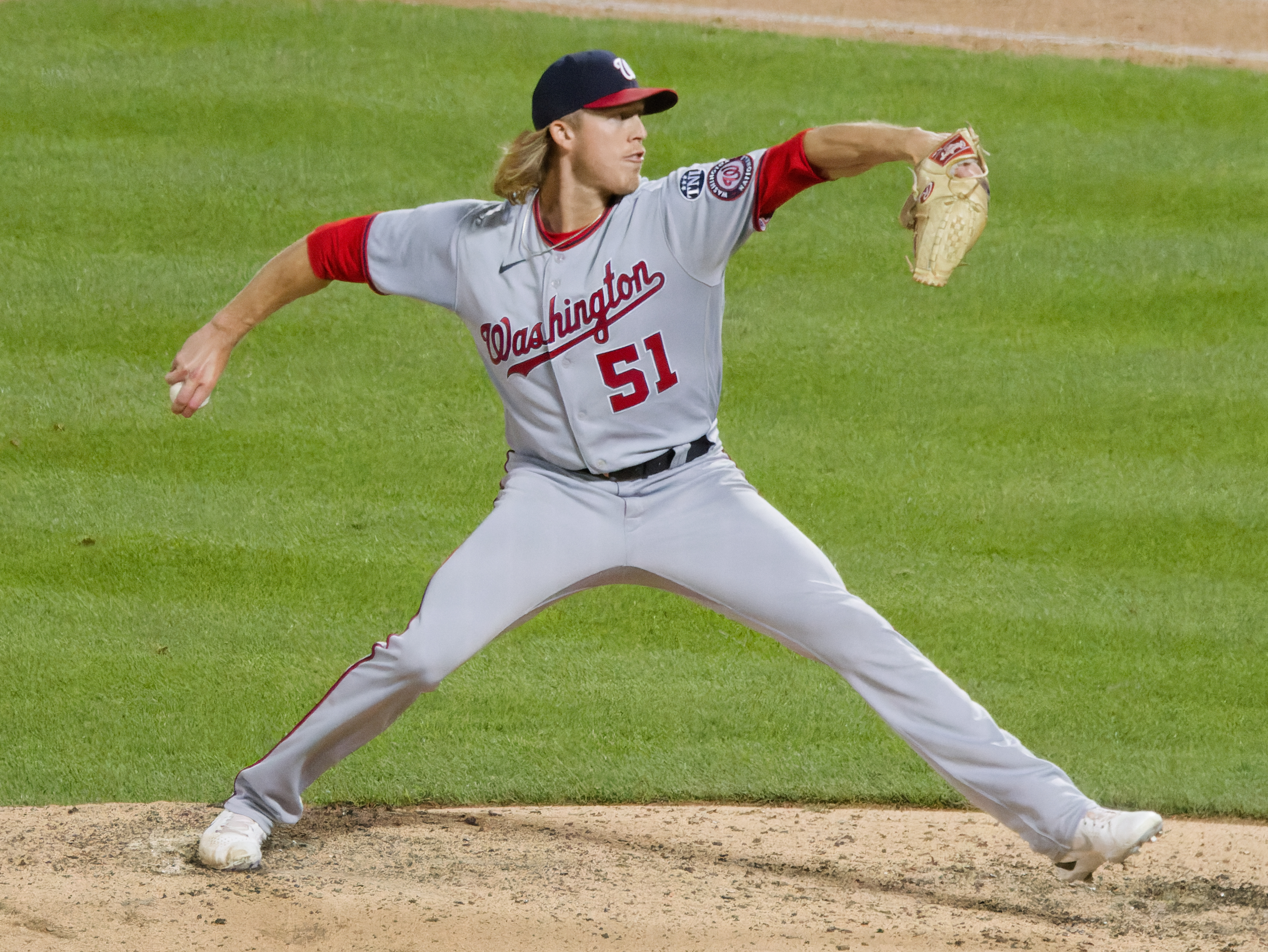
- Weems with the Nationals in 2023

Free agent
- Pitcher
- Born: November 7, 1992 (age 33); Columbus, Georgia, U.S.
- Bats: Left Throws: Right

MLB debut
- July 28, 2020, for the Oakland Athletics

MLB statistics (through 2025 season)
- Win–loss record: 6–5
- Earned run average: 5.51
- Strikeouts: 161
- Stats at Baseball Reference

Teams
- Oakland Athletics (2020–2021); Arizona Diamondbacks (2021); Washington Nationals (2022–2024); Houston Astros (2025)

Jordan Blake Weems (born November 7, 1992) is an American professional baseball pitcher who is a free agent. He has previously played in Major League Baseball (MLB) for the Oakland Athletics, Arizona Diamondbacks, Washington Nationals, and Houston Astros. He was drafted by the Boston Red Sox in the third round of the 2011 MLB draft and he made his MLB debut with the Athletics in 2020.

== Career ==
=== Boston Red Sox ===
Weems was drafted by the Boston Red Sox as a catcher in the third round of the 2011 Major League Baseball draft out of Columbus High School in Columbus, Georgia. Weems had committed to play college baseball at Georgia State. Weems made his professional debut with the rookie-level Gulf Coast League Red Sox. In 2012, Weems played for the Single-A Greenville Drive, batting .201/.308/.238 with 29 RBI. He returned to Greenville in 2013, where he hit .204/.301/.244 with 13 RBI in 61 games. For the 2014 season, Weems split the year between Greenville and the High-A Salem Red Sox, posting a cumulative .220/.324/.282 slash line with 1 home run and 15 RBI. In 2015, Weems split the season between Salem and the Double-A Portland Sea Dogs, slashing .244/.309/.355 in 48 games between the two teams.

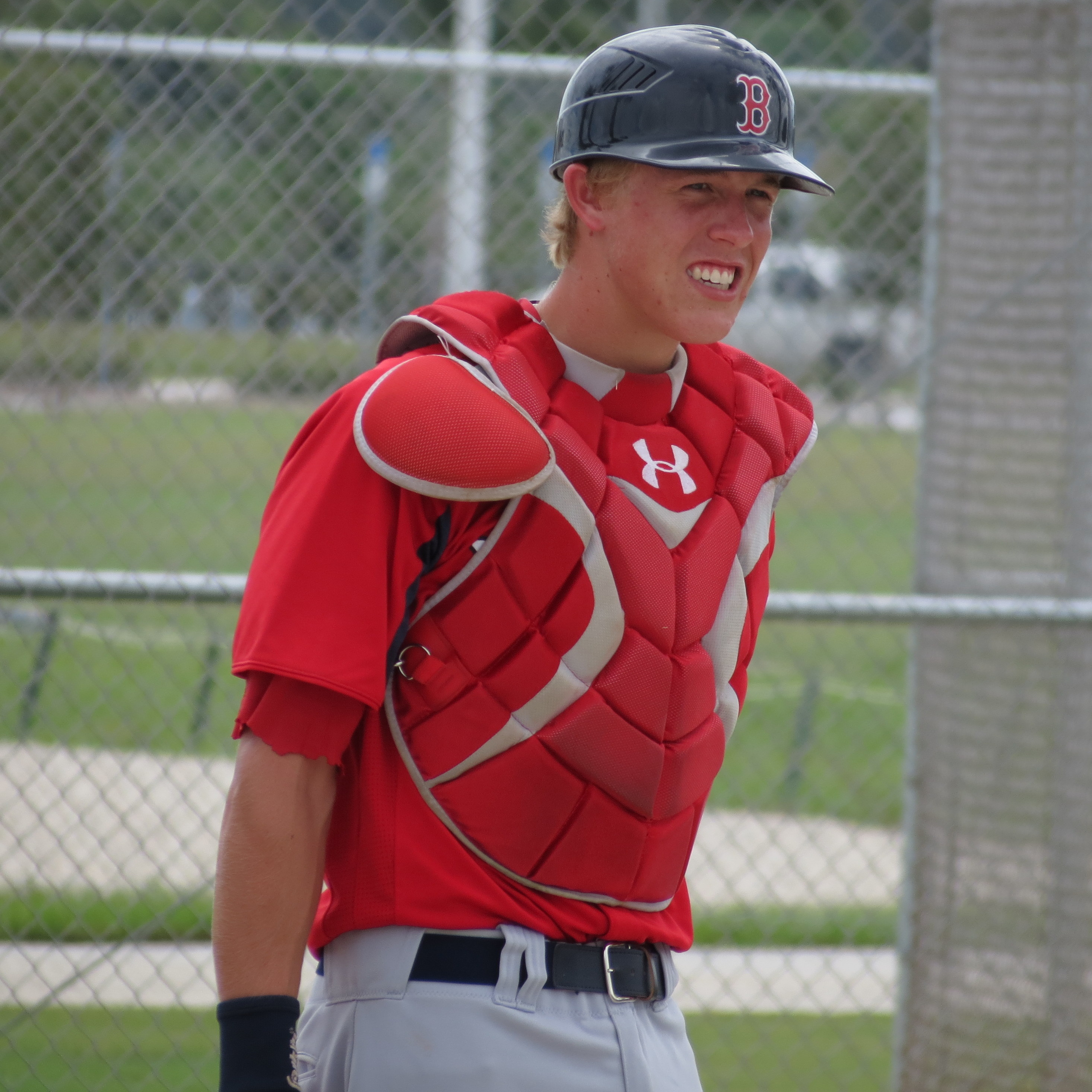
Weems as a catcher in 2012

After spending his first 5 years in the minor leagues as a catcher, Weems converted into a relief pitcher in 2016. In 19 games between the GCL Red Sox and the Low-A Lowell Spinners, Weems recorded a 3–0 record and 3.58 ERA. In 2017, Weems split the season between Salem, Greenville, and the GCL Red Sox, accumulating a 6–2 record and 4.10 ERA in 24 appearances.. For the 2018 season, Weems split the year between Salem, Portland, and the Triple-A Pawtucket Red Sox, recording a cumulative 4–3 record and 3.36 ERA with 63 strikeouts in 59 innings of work between the three teams.. In 2019, Weems returned to Portland and Pawtucket, pitching to a 4.37 ERA in 41 appearances between the two teams. On November 4, 2019, Weems elected free agency after 9 years in the Red Sox minor league system.

=== Oakland Athletics ===
On December 3, 2019, Weems signed a minor league contract with the Oakland Athletics organization. Weems made the Opening Day roster for Oakland and made his major league debut on July 28, 2020, against the Colorado Rockies, giving up 2 runs over 4 innings of work. He finished his rookie season with an ERA of 3.21 in 9 games.

In 2021, Weems split time between the Triple-A Las Vegas Aviators and Oakland, recording a 6.23 ERA in 5 big league appearances before being designated for assignment on July 3, 2021.

=== Arizona Diamondbacks ===
On July 5, 2021, Weems was claimed off of waivers by the Arizona Diamondbacks. In two games with Arizona, he gave up seven earned runs and struck out three in 1 1/3 innings. On August 12, Weems was removed from the 40–man roster and sent outright to the Triple–A Reno Aces.

=== Washington Nationals ===
On February 27, 2022, Weems signed a minor league contract with the Washington Nationals that included an invitation to spring training. On May 31, Washington selected his contract to the active roster. Weems made a career-high 32 appearances for Washington, working to an 0–1 record and 5.22 ERA with 41 strikeouts in 39 2/3 innings pitched.

Weems was optioned to the Triple-A Rochester Red Wings to begin the 2023 season. He made 51 appearances out of the bullpen for Washington, compiling a 5–1 record and 3.62 ERA with 60 strikeouts across 54 2/3 innings pitched.

Weems made 41 appearances for Washington in 2024, struggling to a 6.70 ERA with 35 strikeouts across 41 2/3 innings pitched. On August 13, 2024, Weems was designated for assignment by the Nationals. He cleared waivers and was sent outright to Rochester on August 16. Weems elected free agency on October 1.

=== Atlanta Braves ===
On December 17, 2024, Weems signed a minor league contract with the Atlanta Braves. In 14 appearances for the Triple-A Gwinnett Stripers, he logged a 1-1 record and 5.09 ERA with 18 strikeouts and one save across 17 2/3 innings pitched. Weems was released by the Braves organization on May 19, 2025.

=== Houston Astros ===
On June 2, 2025, Weems signed a minor league contract with the Houston Astros. In nine appearances for the Triple-A Sugar Land Space Cowboys, he posted a 2-1 record and 3.97 ERA with 10 strikeouts across 11 1/3 innings pitched. On June 24, the Astros selected Weems' contract, adding him to their active roster. In two appearances for Houston, he struggled to an 0-1 record and 6.00 ERA with no strikeouts over three innings pitched. Weems was designated for assignment by the Astros on July 4. He elected free agency after clearing waivers on July 7. On July 9, Weems re-signed with the Astros organization on a minor league contract. On August 13, the Astros added Weems back to their active roster. After allowing five runs in 1 1/3 innings across two games against the Baltimore Orioles, Weems was designated for assignment on August 18. He cleared waivers and was sent outright to Triple-A Sugar Land on August 20. Weems elected free agency on September 29.

=== Los Angeles Dodgers ===
On February 9, 2026, Weems signed a minor league contract with the Los Angeles Dodgers. He was assigned to the Triple-A Oklahoma City Comets to begin the regular season, but struggled to an 0-1 record and 9.88 ERA with nine strikeouts in 13 2/3 innings pitched across 17 appearances. Weems was released by the Dodgers organization on May 18.

== Personal life ==
Weems father, Rick, was a Minor League catcher in the St Louis Cardinals organization from 1980-1982.

On February 9, 2024, Weems and his girlfriend, Melody, got engaged.
