= 2022 Washington Nationals season =

2022 Washington Nationals
- League: National League
- Division: East
- Ballpark: Nationals Park
- City: Washington, D.C.
- Record: 55–107 (.340)
- Divisional place: 5th
- Owners: Lerner Enterprises
- General managers: Mike Rizzo
- Managers: Dave Martinez
- Television: MASN (Bob Carpenter, Dave Jageler, Dan Kolko, Kevin Frandsen, Ryan Zimmerman)
- Radio: 106.7 The Fan; Washington Nationals Radio Network (Charlie Slowes, Dave Jageler)

The 2022 Washington Nationals season was the Nationals' 18th season as the baseball franchise of Major League Baseball in the District of Columbia, the 15th season at Nationals Park, and the 54th since the original team was started in Montreal, Quebec, Canada. The Nationals failed to improve on their 65–97 record from the previous year, losing 107 games, having the worst record in the major leagues for the first time since 2009. The 107 losses came just three years after their first World Series title in 2019. It also marked the first time since 2009 that the Nationals lost 100 or more games in one season. In addition, it is the fifth time in franchise history that the Nationals lost 100 or more games, along with 1969, 1976, 2008, and 2009. To further add to Washington's dismal season, Juan Soto, along with Josh Bell, left the team via a trade to the San Diego Padres during the trade deadline.

On December 2, 2021, Commissioner of Baseball Rob Manfred announced a lockout of players, following expiration of the collective bargaining agreement (CBA) between the league and the Major League Baseball Players Association (MLBPA). On March 10, 2022, MLB and the MLBPA agreed to a new collective bargaining agreement, thus ending the lockout. Opening Day was played on April 7. Although MLB previously announced that several series would be cancelled due to the lockout, the agreement provides for a 162-game season, with originally canceled games to be made up via doubleheaders.

Near the end of the first half of the MLB season, the Washington Nationals went on a 9-game losing streak, their longest since their 11-game losing streak that started near the end of their 2008 season and extended into the beginning of the 2009 season. On September 6, they were the first team eliminated from playoff contention.

== Offseason ==
=== Lockout ===
The expiration of the league's collective bargaining agreement (CBA) with the Major League Baseball Players Association occurred on December 1, 2021, with no new agreement in place. As a result, the team owners voted unanimously to lockout the players stopping all free agency and trades.

The parties came to an agreement on a new CBA on March 10, 2022.

=== Rule changes ===
Pursuant to the new CBA, several new rules were instituted for the 2022 season. The National League will adopt the designated hitter full-time, a draft lottery will be implemented, the postseason will expand from ten teams to twelve, and advertising patches will appear on player uniforms and helmets for the first time.

=== Team news ===
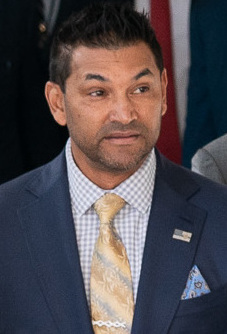
Manager Dave Martinez returned for his fifth season with the Nationals, with several new members of his coaching staff.

After finishing with the fifth-worst record in Major League Baseball (65–97) in the 2021 season, the Nationals are expected to draft fifth overall in the 2022 Major League Baseball draft, barring a change in the draft order under a new collective bargaining agreement.

Despite the Nationals' losing record and poor pitching performances in 2021, manager Dave Martinez announced that pitching coach Jim Hickey would return for a second year in 2022; Martinez himself will return for a fifth season, along with most of the 2021 coaching staff. The Washington Post reported that first base coach Randy Knorr and third base coach Bob Henley would not return to the major league field staff, instead becoming the catching and field coordinators for the Nationals' player development system, following the departure of a number of coaches and coordinators late in the 2021 season. With hitting coach Kevin Long's one-year contract expiring, The Athletic reported that he would join the Philadelphia Phillies coaching staff, replacing former Nationals coach Joe Dillon, who returned to Washington as the organization's new minor league hitting coordinator. To replace Long, the Nationals announced the hiring of veteran hitting coach Darnell Coles, most recently of the Arizona Diamondbacks, on October 18, 2021. The Nationals hired former professional outfielder and Seattle Mariners minor league coach Eric Young Jr. as their first base coach later that month. The day after the 2021 World Series ended, on November 3, the Nationals announced the hiring of two new coaches previously with the New York Mets: third base coach Gary DiSarcina and bullpen coach Ricky Bones, with incumbent bullpen coach Henry Blanco moving to a newly created position as catching and strategy coach. The Nationals also replaced head strength and conditioning coach Matt Eiden, promoting Tony Rogowski from a minor league coordinator position to take on the major league coaching job. Minor league pitching coach Sam Narron was named pitching coordinator for the entire player development system, paired with Knorr and Henley in their new development roles. The Nationals also hired former major league outfielder Coco Crisp as outfield and baserunning coordinator, along with former minor league manager José Alguacil as infield coordinator and former major league infielder Bill Mueller as quality control coordinator. De Jon Watson, previously a special assistant to general manager Mike Rizzo, was named as the Nationals' new director of player development after assistant general manager Mark Scialabba, who had overseen player development for the Nationals since 2013, was reassigned to focus on player personnel. Organizational stalwart Spin Williams was joined by former Mets bench coach Dave Jauss as senior advisor to Watson in his new player development role. Under Watson, the Nationals made a major expansion to their minor league player development staff over the offseason, creating fourteen new positions and hiring more than 20 new staff members.

Catcher Alex Avila, left-handed pitcher Luis Avilán, first baseman Ryan Zimmerman, infielders Alcides Escobar and Jordy Mercer, and outfielder Gerardo Parra were set to become unrestricted free agents following the 2021 season. Three of those players retired, while the other three returned to the organization on new contracts. Avila announced on September 19, 2021, that he would retire from professional baseball. Zimmerman, the Nationals' longest-tenured player and first pick in the 2005 draft, announced his retirement on February 15, 2022. Mercer announced he was retiring as well on April 5, 2022. The Nationals announced a $1 million extension for Escobar through the 2022 season on October 5, 2021, days after the end of the regular season. Avilán signed a new minor league deal in November to remain with the Nationals as he continued to rehab from Tommy John surgery. Parra also signed a minor league deal with an invitation to spring training. Additionally, the Nationals saw left-handed pitchers Alberto Baldonado and Sean Nolin and right-handed pitchers Steven Fuentes and Kyle McGowin depart as minor league free agents after they were outrighted to the Triple-A Rochester Red Wings. Baldonado, Fuentes, and Nolin signed new minor league contracts to return to the Nationals organization, although the Nationals later released Nolin so he could sign with the Kia Tigers of the KBO League in South Korea.

The Nationals entered the offseason with ten players expected to be eligible for salary arbitration: right-handed pitchers Erick Fedde, Ryne Harper, Tanner Rainey, Joe Ross, Wander Suero, and Austin Voth, first baseman Josh Bell, and outfielders Víctor Robles, Juan Soto, and Andrew Stevenson. They avoided arbitration with Stevenson on November 29, signing him to an $850,000 non-guaranteed salary. Harper and Suero were not tendered new contracts, nor was first baseman Mike Ford, who was not eligible for arbitration. The Nationals settled with Bell, Fedde, Rainey, Ross, Soto, and Voth on March 22, 2022, and with Robles on April 3.

Free agents linked to the Nationals in media reports included left-handed pitcher Andrew Heaney (most recently of the Los Angeles Angels; ultimately signed with the Los Angeles Dodgers); and outfielders Kyle Schwarber (most recently of the Boston Red Sox; ultimately signed with the Philadelphia Phillies), Seiya Suzuki (posted by the Hiroshima Toyo Carp of Nippon Professional Baseball; ultimately signed with the Chicago Cubs), and Chris Taylor (most recently of the Los Angeles Dodgers; ultimately re-signed with the Dodgers).

For their first offseason acquisition, the Nationals claimed rookie left-handed reliever Francisco Pérez off waivers from the Cleveland Guardians on November 5, 2021. Washington also claimed infielder Lucius Fox from the interleague-rival Baltimore Orioles on November 30, furthermore signing free agent infielder César Hernández the same day.

The offseason was brought to a virtual halt as Nationals principal owner Mark Lerner and 29 other team owners voted unanimously to institute a lockout, due to the expiration of the collective bargaining agreement that had been in effect since the 2016 season on December 1, 2021. During the lockout, the Nationals continued to sign players to minor league contracts, including veteran infielders Dee Strange-Gordon and Maikel Franco and outfielder Rusney Castillo, and acquired another player with major league experience, infielder Andrew Young, from the Arizona Diamondbacks in the minor league portion of the Rule 5 draft. The lockout was in effect for 99 days, delaying the start of spring training and forcing some games in the regular season to be rescheduled, before owners voted unanimously to lift it after a new collective bargaining agreement was agreed to March 10, 2022.

Following the lockout, the Nationals signed infielder Ehire Adrianza and right-handed reliever Steve Cishek to major league deals announced March 14, 2022. The Nationals also brought back reliever Sean Doolittle, who served as the team's closer for parts of the 2017, 2018, and 2019 seasons and departed as a free agent after the 2020 season, announcing a one-year major league pact with the left-hander on March 16. Nelson Cruz signed a one-year deal with the Nationals that was announced the following day, filling Washington's need at the new designated hitter lineup spot. With an open roster spot due to third baseman Carter Kieboom spraining his ulnar collateral ligament of the elbow and landing on the 60-day injured list, the Nationals claimed former first-round pick Hunter Harvey, a right-handed pitcher, off waivers from the San Francisco Giants on March 21.

=== Transactions ===
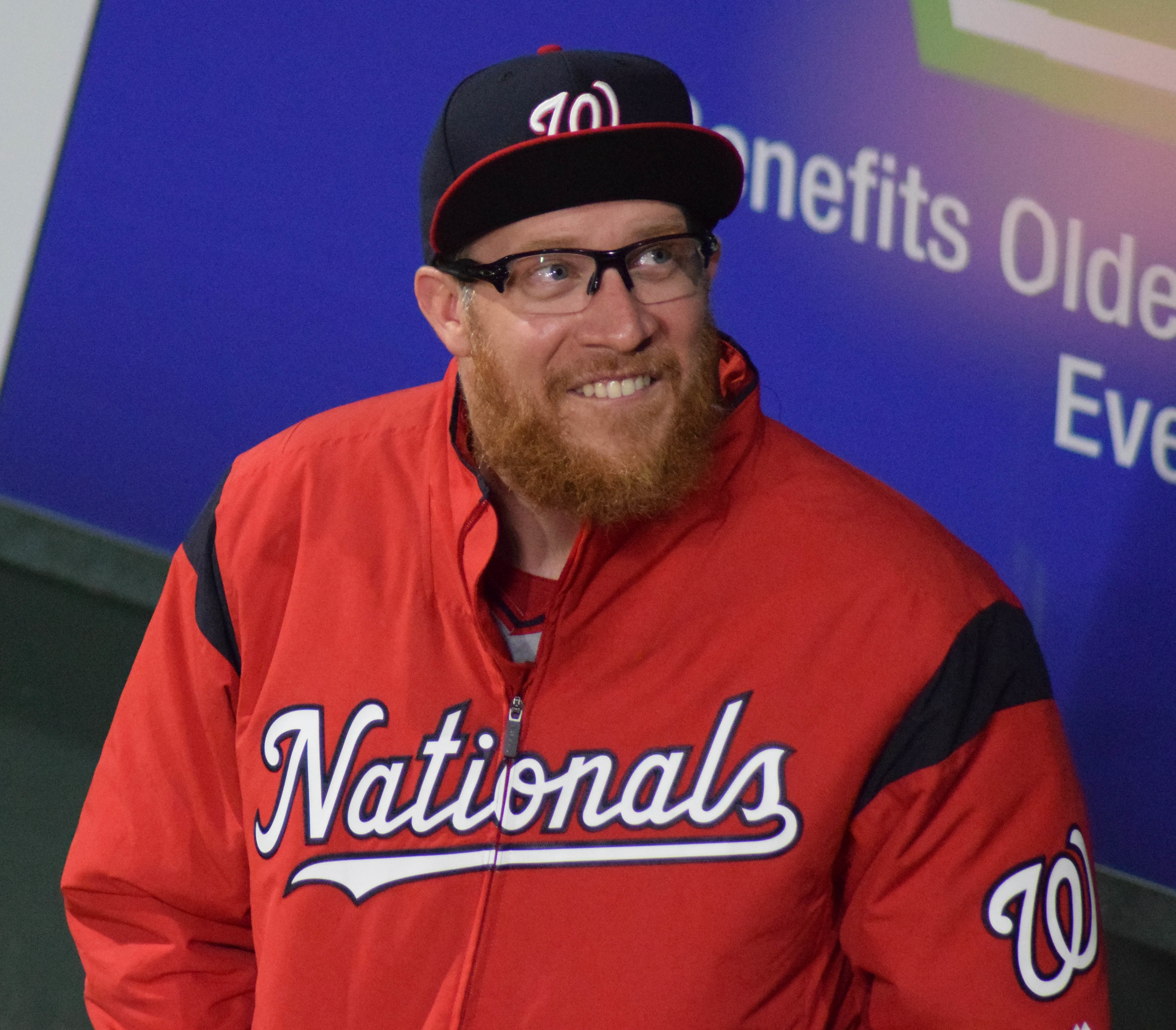
The Nationals re-signed former closer Sean Doolittle to a major league contract after what Doolittle described as a "gap year" pitching in other organizations.

- October 5, 2021: The Nationals signed infielder Alcides Escobar to a one-year contract extension.
- October 13, 2021: The Nationals outrighted left-handed pitchers Alberto Baldonado and Sean Nolin and right-handed pitcher Steven Fuentes to the Triple-A Rochester Red Wings; Nolin elected free agency.
- October 18, 2021: The Nationals hired hitting coach Darnell Coles.
- November 3, 2021: The Nationals hired first base coach Eric Young Jr., third base coach Gary DiSarcina, and bullpen coach Ricky Bones.
- November 5, 2021: The Nationals claimed left-handed pitcher Francisco Pérez off waivers from the Cleveland Guardians and outrighted right-handed pitcher Kyle McGowin to the Triple-A Rochester Red Wings.
- November 19, 2021: The Nationals selected the contracts of outfielder Donovan Casey and left-handed pitcher Evan Lee.
- November 30, 2021: The Nationals signed infielder César Hernández to a one-year major league contract, claimed infielder Lucius Fox off waivers from the Baltimore Orioles, and declined to tender new contracts to right-handed pitchers Ryne Harper and Wander Suero and first baseman Mike Ford.
- March 14, 2022: The Nationals signed infielder Ehire Adrianza and right-handed relief pitcher Steve Cishek to one-year major league contracts.
- March 16, 2022: The Nationals signed left-handed relief pitcher Sean Doolittle to a one-year major league contract.
- March 17, 2022: The Nationals signed designated hitter Nelson Cruz to a one-year major league contract and designated right-handed pitcher Jhon Romero for assignment; he was claimed off waivers by the Minnesota Twins.
- March 21, 2022: The Nationals claimed right-handed pitcher Hunter Harvey off waivers from the San Francisco Giants.
- April 2, 2022: The Nationals outrighted outfielder Andrew Stevenson to the Triple-A Rochester Red Wings.
- April 5, 2022: The Nationals selected the contract of right-handed pitcher Aníbal Sánchez.
- April 6, 2022: The Nationals designated right-handed pitcher Gabe Klobosits for assignment; he was claimed off waivers by the Oakland Athletics.
- April 7, 2022: The Nationals selected the contracts of right-handed pitcher Víctor Arano and infielders Maikel Franco and Dee Strange-Gordon.

=== Spring training ===
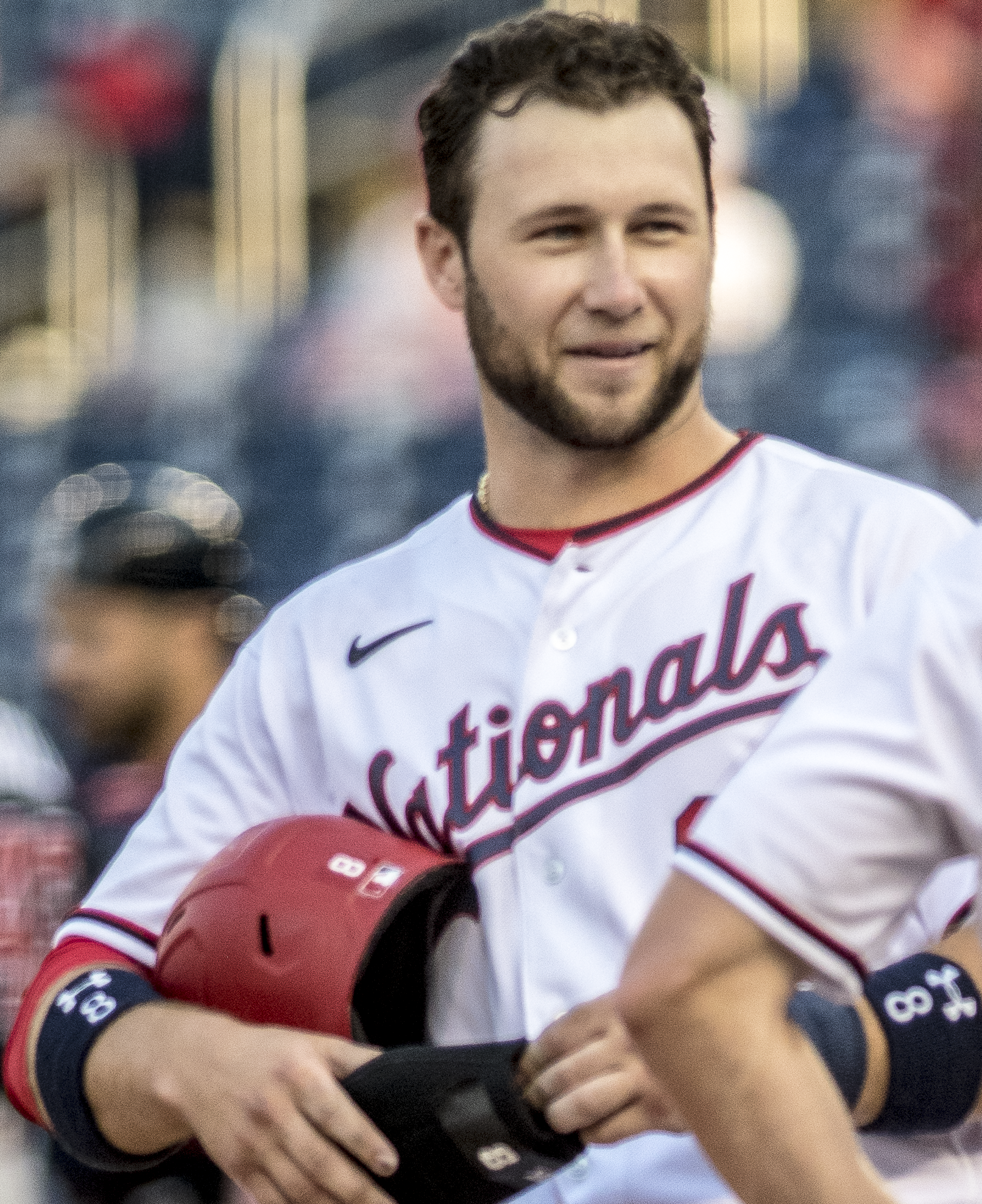
Third baseman Carter Kieboom suffered an arm injury that took him out of contention for the Opening Day lineup early on in spring training.

The Nationals held spring training at their facility at The Ballpark of the Palm Beaches in West Palm Beach, Florida, which they share with the Houston Astros in their sixth year at the facility.

Non-roster participants in major league spring training for the Nationals included right-handed pitchers Víctor Arano, Cade Cavalli, Carl Edwards Jr., Jace Fry, Reed Garrett, Erasmo Ramírez, Jefry Rodríguez, Jackson Rutledge, Aaron Sanchez, Aníbal Sánchez, and Jordan Weems; left-handed pitchers Luis Avilán, Alberto Baldonado, and Matt Cronin; catchers Taylor Gushue, Chris Herrmann, Drew Millas, and Israel Pineda; infielders Jackson Cluff, Maikel Franco, Jake Noll, Adrián Sánchez, Dee Strange-Gordon, Richard Ureña, and Andrew Young; and outfielder Gerardo Parra. Right-handed reliever Tyler Clippard, who pitched with the Nationals for seven years through the 2014 season, was a late addition to the list of non-roster invitees, signing a minor league deal with Washington announced March 26.

Several Nationals players dealt with injuries during spring training. Carter Kieboom, expected to contend for an everyday role again as Washington's third baseman, landed on the 60-day injured list after being diagnosed with a flexor mass strain and partially torn UCL in his right arm. Ehire Adrianza, signed in the offseason as a utilityman, injured his quadriceps while running the bases in an exhibition game and landed on the 10-day injured list. Reliever Will Harris, in the final year of an injury-plagued three-year contract with Washington, appeared in just one game before being sidelined with lingering issues from his 2021 thoracic outlet surgery. Harris left camp early and underwent another surgery on his arm to remove scar tissue that was impinging upon a nerve. He was placed on the 60-day injured list as well. Staff ace Stephen Strasburg and pitching prospect Seth Romero also went to the injured list to begin the season, with Strasburg on the 10-day IL for continuing rehab from thoracic outlet surgery and Romero on the 60-day IL with a left calf strain.

Andrew Stevenson, in contention for a bench spot as an outfielder, was cut from the team roster on April 2. The Nationals outrighted Stevenson, who was ineligible for optional assignment, to the Triple-A Rochester Red Wings. Stevenson's roster spot went to Aníbal Sánchez, who was initially a non-roster invitee in his return to the Nationals organization after previously pitching for Washington in the 2019 and 2020 seasons. The Nationals also gave Arano, Franco, and Strange-Gordon spots on the Opening Day roster, as well as promoting prospects Joan Adon and Lucius Fox after they impressed during spring training. Relief prospect Gabe Klobosits was designated for assignment in a corresponding move.

In Grapefruit League play against other teams with spring training complexes in South Florida, the Nationals went 4–11.

== Regular season ==
=== Opening Day lineup ===
Opening Day Starters
Name	Position
César Hernández	Second baseman
Juan Soto	Right fielder
Nelson Cruz	Designated hitter
Josh Bell	First baseman
Keibert Ruiz	Catcher
Lane Thomas	Left fielder
Maikel Franco	Third baseman
Alcides Escobar	Shortstop
Víctor Robles	Center fielder

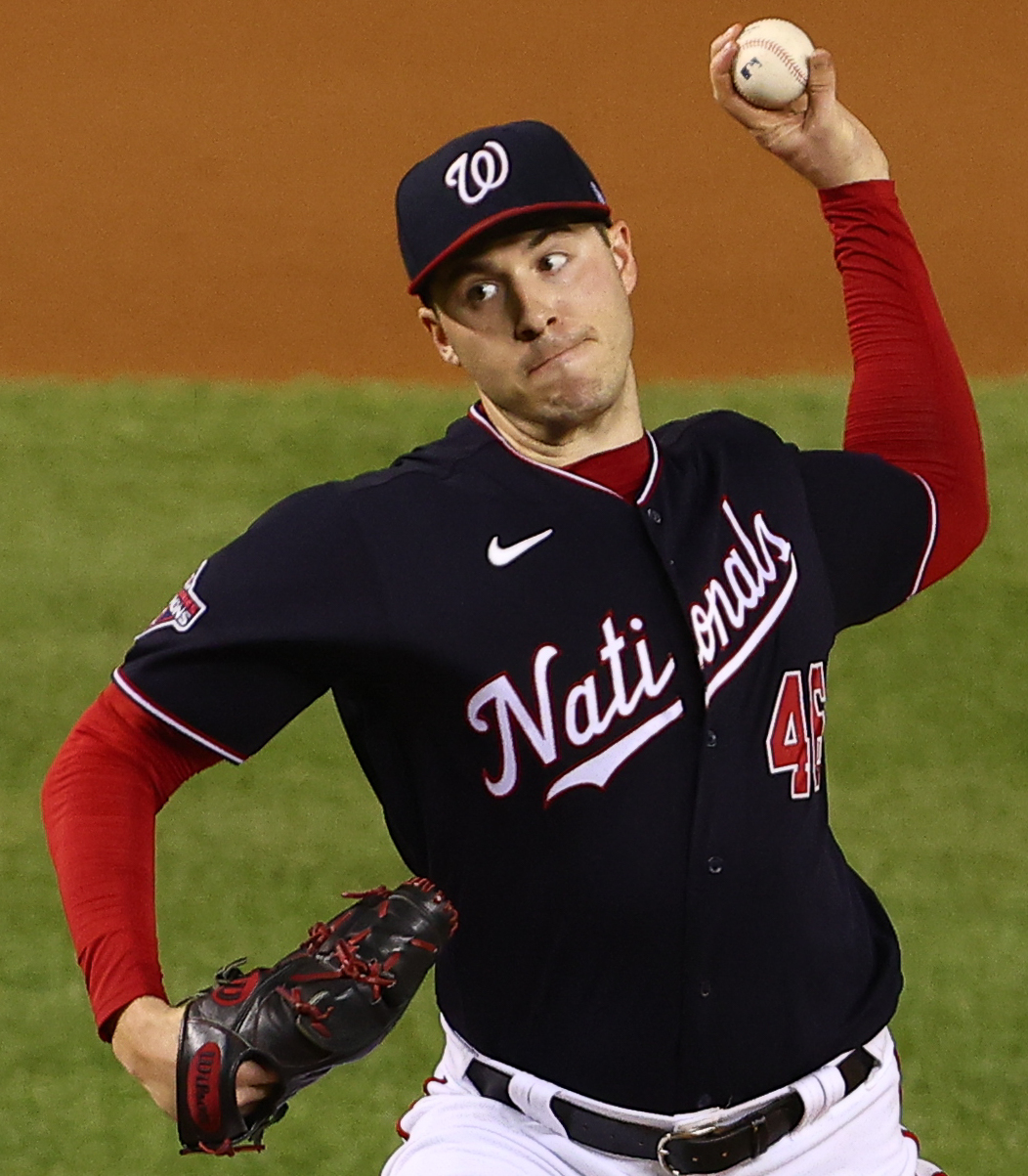
Patrick Corbin was the Nationals' Opening Day starter for the first time in his fourth season with the team.

=== Season standings ===
==== National League East ====
NL East
Team	W	L	Pct.	GB	Home	Road
Atlanta Braves	101	61	.623	—	55‍–‍26	46‍–‍35
New York Mets	101	61	.623	—	54‍–‍27	47‍–‍34
Philadelphia Phillies	87	75	.537	14	47‍–‍34	40‍–‍41
Miami Marlins	69	93	.426	32	34‍–‍47	35‍–‍46
Washington Nationals	55	107	.340	46	26‍–‍55	29‍–‍52

==== National League Wild Card ====
Division leaders
Team	W	L	Pct.
Los Angeles Dodgers	111	51	.685
Atlanta Braves	101	61	.623
St. Louis Cardinals	93	69	.574

Wild Card teams (Top 3 teams qualify for postseason)
Team	W	L	Pct.	GB
New York Mets	101	61	.623	+14
San Diego Padres	89	73	.549	+2
Philadelphia Phillies	87	75	.537	—
Milwaukee Brewers	86	76	.531	1
San Francisco Giants	81	81	.500	6
Arizona Diamondbacks	74	88	.457	13
Chicago Cubs	74	88	.457	13
Miami Marlins	69	93	.426	18
Colorado Rockies	68	94	.420	19
Pittsburgh Pirates	62	100	.383	25
Cincinnati Reds	62	100	.383	25
Washington Nationals	55	107	.340	32

=== Record vs. opponents ===
2022 National League record Source: MLB Standings Grid – 2022
Team	AZ	ATL	CHC	CIN	COL	LAD	MIA	MIL	NYM	PHI	PIT	SD	SF	STL	WSH	AL
Arizona	—	2–4	4–3	3–4	9–10	5–14	5–1	4–3	2–4	3–3	4–3	5–14	10–9	2–5	4–3	12–8
Atlanta	4–2	—	3–3	4–3	6–1	2–4	13–6	3–3	10–9	11–8	7–0	3–4	4–3	4–3	14–5	13–7
Chicago	3–4	3–3	—	11–8	3–4	0–7	4–2	10–9	4–3	6–0	10–9	2–5	2–5	6–13	4–2	6–14
Cincinnati	4–3	3–4	8–11	—	2–4	0–7	4–3	6–13	1–5	1–6	7–12	0–6	4–2	7–12	3–4	12–8
Colorado	10–9	1–6	4–3	4–2	—	8–11	2–4	3–4	2–5	2–5	3–3	10–9	5–14	2–4	3–4	9–11
Los Angeles	14–5	4–2	7–0	7–0	11–8	—	6–1	4–3	3–4	3–4	1–5	14–5	15–4	4–2	3–3	15–5
Miami	1–5	6–13	2–4	3–4	4–2	1–6	—	4–3	6–13	7–12	4–3	3–4	3–4	2–4	15–4	8–12
Milwaukee	3–4	3–3	9–10	13–6	4–3	3–4	3–4	—	2–4	2–4	11–8	3–4	3–4	9–10	3–3	15–5
New York	4–2	9–10	3–4	5–1	5–2	4–3	13–6	4–2	—	14–5	6–1	2–4	4–3	5–2	14–5	9–11
Philadelphia	3–3	8–11	0–6	6–1	5–2	4–3	12–7	4–2	5–14	—	6–1	4–3	1–5	4–3	16–3	9–11
Pittsburgh	3–4	0–7	9–10	12–7	3–3	5–1	3–4	8–11	1–6	1–6	—	2–4	1–5	6–13	4–3	4–16
San Diego	14–5	4–3	5–2	6–0	9–10	5–14	4–3	4–3	4–2	3–4	4–2	—	13–6	2–4	4–3	8–12
San Francisco	9–10	3–4	5–2	2–4	14–5	4–15	4–3	4–3	3–4	5–1	5–1	6–13	—	3–4	4–2	10–10
St. Louis	5–2	3–4	13–6	12–7	4–2	2–4	4–2	10–9	2–5	3–4	13–6	4–2	4–3	—	4–3	10–10
Washington	3–4	5–14	2–4	4–3	4–3	3–3	4–15	3–3	5–14	3–16	3–4	3–4	2–4	3–4	—	8–12

Updated with the results of all games through October 5, 2022.

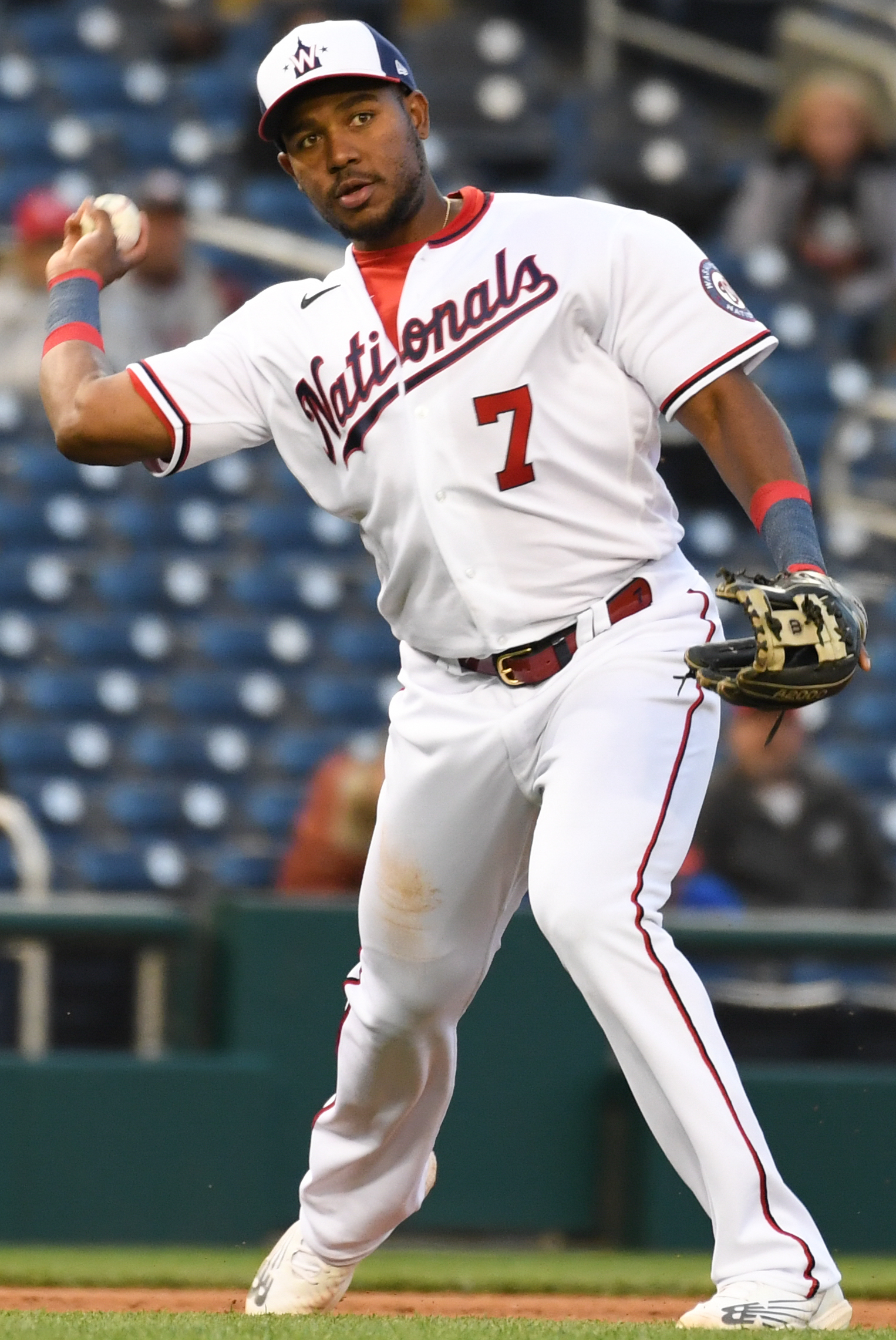
Veteran infielder Maikel Franco

=== Notable transactions ===
- April 15, 2022: The Nationals claimed outfielder Josh Palacios off waivers from the Toronto Blue Jays.
- April 21, 2022: The Nationals selected the contract of right-handed pitcher Erasmo Ramírez.
- April 23, 2022: The Nationals selected the contract of right-handed pitcher Aaron Sanchez and designated right-handed pitcher Patrick Murphy for assignment; he was outrighted to the Triple-A Rochester Red Wings.
- May 4, 2022: The Nationals claimed right-handed pitcher Cory Abbott off waivers from the San Francisco Giants.
- May 28, 2022: The Nationals designated right-handed pitcher Aaron Sanchez for assignment; he elected free agency.
- May 31, 2022: The Nationals selected the contract of right-handed pitcher Jordan Weems and designated right-handed pitcher Austin Voth for assignment; he was claimed off waivers by the Baltimore Orioles.
- June 14, 2022: The Nationals selected the contracts of right-handed pitchers Reed Garrett and Jackson Tetreault and designated infielder/outfielder Dee Strange-Gordon for assignment; he elected free agency.
- July 1, 2022: The Nationals designated left-handed pitcher Sam Clay for assignment; he was claimed off waivers by the Philadelphia Phillies.
- July 13, 2022: The Nationals selected the contract of right-handed pitcher Tyler Clippard.
- August 1, 2022: The Nationals acquired minor league outfielder Trey Harris from the Atlanta Braves for infielder/outfielder Ehire Adrianza and selected the contract of infielder Ildemaro Vargas.
- August 2, 2022: The Nationals acquired shortstop CJ Abrams, left-handed pitcher MacKenzie Gore, first baseman Luke Voit, minor league outfielders Robert Hassell III and James Wood, and minor league pitcher Jarlin Susana from the San Diego Padres for first baseman Josh Bell and outfielder Juan Soto, selected the contract of first baseman Joey Meneses, and designated left-handed pitcher Josh Rogers for assignment; he elected free agency.
- August 3, 2022: The Nationals released infielder Alcides Escobar.
- August 7, 2022: The Nationals claimed outfielder Alex Call off waivers from the Cleveland Guardians.
- August 9, 2022: The Nationals claimed left-handed pitcher Jake McGee off waivers from the Milwaukee Brewers and designated outfielder Donovan Casey for assignment; he was outrighted to the Triple-A Rochester Red Wings.
- August 23, 2022: The Nationals designated right-handed pitcher Tyler Clippard for assignment; he elected free agency.
- August 25, 2022: The Nationals claimed right-handed pitcher Tommy Romero off waivers from the Tampa Bay Rays.
- August 26, 2022: The Nationals selected the contract of right-handed pitcher Cade Cavalli and released third baseman Maikel Franco.
- September 9, 2022: The Nationals selected the contract of catcher Israel Pineda and designated left-handed pitcher Jake McGee for assignment.

=== Major league debuts ===
- April 10, 2022: Lucius Fox
- June 1, 2022: Evan Lee
- June 14, 2022: Jackson Tetreault
- August 2, 2022: Joey Meneses
- August 26, 2022: Cade Cavalli
- September 11, 2022: Israel Pineda

=== Game log ===
Due to the 2021–22 Major League Baseball lockout, Opening Day was pushed back to April 7, and the first two series of the season were rescheduled.

2022 game log: 55–107 (Home: 26–55; Away: 29–52)
March: 0–0 (Home: 0–0; Away: 0–0)

#	Date	Opponent	Score	Win	Loss	Save	Attendance	Record	Streak
-	March 31	@ Mets	Postponed (lockout) Makeup on October 3						

April: 7–16 (Home: 3–11; Away: 4–5)

#	Date	Opponent	Score	Win	Loss	Save	Attendance	Record	Streak
-	April 2	@ Mets	Postponed (lockout) Makeup on October 4						
-	April 3	@ Mets	Postponed (lockout) Makeup on October 5						
-	April 4	Phillies	Postponed (lockout) Makeup on June 17						
-	April 6	Phillies	Postponed (lockout) Makeup on October 1						
1	April 7	Mets	1–5	Megill (1–0)	**Corbin** (0–1)	—	35,052	0–1	L1
2	April 8	Mets	3–7	Scherzer (1–0)	**Gray** (0–1)	—	25,677	0–2	L2
3	April 9	Mets	0–5	Bassitt (1–0)	**Adon** (0–1)	—	21,369	0–3	L3
4	April 10	Mets	4–2	**Finnegan** (1–0)	Williams (0–1)	**Rainey** (1)	23,158	1–3	W1
5	April 11	@ Braves	11–2	**Rogers** (1–0)	Ynoa (0–1)	—	42,263	2–3	W2
6	April 12	@ Braves	4–16	Elder (1–0)	**Corbin** (0–2)	Stephens (1)	31,462	2–4	L1
7	April 13	@ Braves	3–1	**Gray** (1–1)	Fried (0–2)	**Rainey** (2)	31,959	3–4	W1
8	April 14	@ Pirates	4–9	Contreras (1–0)	**Adon** (0–2)	—	9,266	3–5	L1
9	April 15	@ Pirates	7–2	**Fedde** (1–0)	Keller (0–2)	—	13,076	4–5	W1
10	April 16	@ Pirates	4–6	Peters (2–0)	**Rogers** (1–1)	—	8,676	4–6	L1
11	April 17	@ Pirates	3–5	Hembree (1–0)	**Cishek** (0–1)	Bednar (1)	8,735	4–7	L2
—	April 18	Diamondbacks	Postponed (rain) Makeup on April 19						
12	April 19 (1)	Diamondbacks	6–1	**Gray** (2–1)	Bumgarner (0–1)	—	9,261	5–7	W1
13	April 19 (2)	Diamondbacks	1–0	**Adon** (1–2)	Gilbert (0–1)	**Rainey** (3)	11,720	6–7	W2
14	April 20	Diamondbacks	2–11	Kelly (1–0)	**Fedde** (1–1)	—	15,774	6–8	L1
15	April 21	Diamondbacks	3–4	Davies (1–1)	**Rogers** (1–2)	Melancon (2)	14,424	6–9	L2
16	April 22	Giants	1–7	Junis (1–0)	**Corbin** (0–3)	—	23,751	6–10	L3
17	April 23	Giants	2–5	Wood (2–0)	**Sanchez** (0–1)	Doval (3)	27,799	6–11	L4
18	April 24	Giants	3–12	Webb (2–1)	**Adon** (1–3)	—	26,003	6–12	L5
19	April 26	Marlins	2–5	Alcántara (2–0)	**Gray** (2–2)	Bender (3)	12,613	6–13	L6
20	April 27	Marlins	1–2	López (3–0)	**Fedde** (1–2)	Bender (4)	13,356	6–14	L7
21	April 28	Marlins	2–3	Rogers (1–3)	**Corbin** (0–4)	Sulser (1)	12,454	6–15	L8
22	April 29	@ Giants	14–4	**Sanchez** (1–1)	Wood (2–1)	—	38,256	7–15	W1
23	April 30	@ Giants	3–9	Webb (3–1)	**Adon** (1–4)	—	33,241	7–16	L1

May: 11–17 (Home: 6–7; Away: 5–10)

#	Date	Opponent	Score	Win	Loss	Save	Attendance	Record	Streak
24	May 1	@ Giants	11–5	**Gray** (3–2)	Cobb (1–1)	—	38,451	8–16	W1
25	May 3	@ Rockies	10–2	**Fedde** (2–2)	Márquez (0–2)	—	20,758	9–16	W2
26	May 4	@ Rockies	2–5	Gomber (2–2)	**Corbin** (0–5)	Bard (7)	19,387	9–17	L1
27	May 5	@ Rockies	7–9	Chacín (3–1)	**Sanchez** (1–2)	Bard (8)	30,139	9–18	L2
28	May 6	@ Angels	0–3	Díaz (1–0)	**Adon** (1–5)	Iglesias (7)	41,923	9–19	L3
29	May 7	@ Angels	7–3	**Gray** (4–2)	Lorenzen (3–2)	—	30,666	10–19	W1
30	May 8	@ Angels	4–5	Barría (1–0)	**Rainey** (0–1)	—	32,337	10–20	L1
31	May 10	Mets	2–4	Carrasco (3–1)	**Edwards Jr.** (0–1)	Díaz (7)	21,955	10–21	L2
32	May 11	Mets	8–3	**Sanchez** (2–2)	Megill (4–2)	—	19,715	11–21	W1
33	May 12	Mets	1–4	Walker (1–0)	**Adon** (1–6)	—	21,213	11–22	L1
34	May 13	Astros	1–6	Valdez (2–2)	**Gray** (4–3)	—	18,433	11–23	L2
35	May 14	Astros	13–6	**Rogers** (2–2)	Javier (2–1)	—	22,949	12–23	W1
36	May 15	Astros	0–8	Verlander (5–1)	**Corbin** (0–6)	—	25,915	12–24	L1
37	May 16	@ Marlins	2–8	Alcántara (3–2)	**Sanchez** (2–3)	—	6,601	12–25	L2
38	May 17	@ Marlins	1–5	Bender (1–3)	**Adon** (1–7)	—	8,097	12–26	L3
39	May 18	@ Marlins	5–4 (10)	**Rainey** (1–1)	Castano (0–1)	**Arano** (1)	7,566	13–26	W1
40	May 20	@ Brewers	0–7	Lauer (4–1)	**Fedde** (2–3)	—	29,609	13–27	L1
41	May 21	@ Brewers	1–5	Woodruff (5–2)	**Corbin** (0–7)	Hader (15)	34,837	13–28	L2
42	May 22	@ Brewers	8–2	**Sanchez** (3–3)	Peralta (3–2)	—	39,822	14–28	W1
43	May 23	Dodgers	1–10	Anderson (5–0)	**Adon** (1–8)	—	22,423	14–29	L1
44	May 24	Dodgers	4–9	Buehler (6–1)	**Gray** (4–4)	—	22,413	14–30	L2
45	May 25	Dodgers	1–0	**Fedde** (3–3)	Urías (3–4)	**Rainey** (4)	23,341	15–30	W1
46	May 26	Rockies	7–3	**Corbin** (1–7)	Márquez (1–5)	—	16,264	16–30	W2
—	May 27	Rockies	Postponed (rain) Makeup on May 28						
47	May 28 (1)	Rockies	13–7	**Ramírez** (1–0)	Gomber (2–5)	—	20,294	17–30	W3
48	May 28 (2)	Rockies	2–3	Kuhl (4–2)	**Finnegan** (1–1)	Bard (11)	26,535	17–31	L1
49	May 29	Rockies	6–5	**Gray** (5–4)	Freeland (1–5)	**Rainey** (5)	25,225	18–31	W1
50	May 30	@ Mets	5–13	Holderman (2–0)	**Fedde** (3–4)	—	22,007	18–32	L1
51	May 31	@ Mets	0–10	Williams (1–3)	**Corbin** (1–8)	—	25,263	18–33	L2

June: 11–16 (Home: 5–9; Away: 6–7)

#	Date	Opponent	Score	Win	Loss	Save	Attendance	Record	Streak
52	June 1	@ Mets	0–5	Carrasco (6–1)	**Lee** (0–1)	—	25,417	18–34	L3
53	June 2	@ Reds	1–8	Ashcraft (2–0)	**Adon** (1–9)	—	12,799	18–35	L4
54	June 3	@ Reds	8–5	**Gray** (6–4)	Minor (0–1)	**Rainey** (6)	19,032	19–35	W1
55	June 4	@ Reds	10–8	**Finnegan** (2–1)	Strickland (0–2)	**Rainey** (7)	23,128	20–35	W2
56	June 5	@ Reds	5–4	**Corbin** (2–8)	Castillo (2–3)	**Cishek** (1)	16,380	21–35	W3
57	June 7	@ Marlins	2–12	Cabrera (2–0)	**Adon** (1–10)	—	7,112	21–36	L1
58	June 8	@ Marlins	1–2 (10)	Scott (2–1)	**Rainey** (1–2)	—	7,193	21–37	L2
59	June 9	@ Marlins	4–7	Rogers (3–5)	**Strasburg** (0–1)	Scott (3)	9,108	21–38	L3
60	June 10	Brewers	11–5	**Fedde** (4–4)	Ashby (1–5)	—	26,111	22–38	W1
61	June 11	Brewers	8–6	**Corbin** (3–8)	Lauer (5–2)	—	25,265	23–38	W2
62	June 12	Brewers	1–4	Milner (3–1)	**Espino** (0–1)	Hader (19)	22,549	23–39	L1
63	June 13	Braves	5–9	Lee (1–0)	**Ramírez** (1–1)	—	20,571	23–40	L2
64	June 14	Braves	4–10	Fried (7–2)	**Tetreault** (0–1)	Stephens (2)	24,490	23–41	L3
65	June 15	Braves	2–8	Strider (3–2)	**Fedde** (4–5)	—	21,153	23–42	L4
66	June 16	Phillies	1–10	Wheeler (6–3)	**Corbin** (3–9)	—	19,944	23–43	L5
67	June 17 (1)	Phillies	3–5	Suárez (5–4)	**Adon** (1–11)	Hand (2)	15,501	23–44	L6
68	June 17 (2)	Phillies	7–8 (10)	Alvarado (1–1)	**Cishek** (0–2)	—	24,785	23–45	L7
69	June 18	Phillies	1–2 (10)	Hand (2–1)	**Garrett** (0–1)	Domínguez (1)	42,730	23–46	L8
70	June 19	Phillies	9–3	**Tetreault** (1–1)	Eflin (2–5)	—	32,261	24–46	W1
71	June 21	@ Orioles	3–0	**Fedde** (5–5)	Lyles (4–6)	**Rainey** (8)	19,197	25–46	W2
72	June 22	@ Orioles	0–7 (6)	Wells (5–4)	**Corbin** (3–10)	Vespi (1)	12,630	25–47	L1
73	June 24	@ Rangers	2–1	**Edwards Jr.** (1–1)	Santana (3–3)	**Rainey** (9)	28,854	26–47	W1
74	June 25	@ Rangers	2–3	Barlow (3–1)	**Finnegan** (2–2)	—	36,183	26–48	L1
75	June 26	@ Rangers	6–4	**Tetreault** (2–1)	Otto (4–3)	**Rainey** (10)	34,220	27–48	W1
76	June 27	Pirates	3–2	**Edwards Jr.** (2–1)	Stratton (4–4)	**Finnegan** (1)	18,213	28–48	W2
77	June 28	Pirates	3–1	**Corbin** (4–10)	Crowe (3–5)	**Rainey** (11)	22,757	29–48	W3
78	June 29	Pirates	7–8	De Jong (3–0)	**Edwards Jr.** (2–2)	De Los Santos (1)	19,870	29–49	L1

July: 6–19 (Home: 2–11; Away: 4–8)

#	Date	Opponent	Score	Win	Loss	Save	Attendance	Record	Streak
79	July 1	Marlins	3–6	Rogers (4–6)	**Gray** (6–5)	Scott (8)	23,794	29–50	L2
80	July 2	Marlins	3–5	Castano (1–1)	**Tetreault** (2–2)	Scott (9)	19,674	29–51	L3
81	July 3	Marlins	4–7 (10)	Scott (4–2)	**Edwards Jr.** (2–3)	Floro (1)	25,385	29–52	L4
82	July 4	Marlins	2–3 (10)	Yacabonis (1–1)	**Rainey** (1–3)	Floro (2)	25,129	29–53	L5
83	July 5	@ Phillies	0–11	Sánchez (1–1)	**Espino** (0–2)	—	20,217	29–54	L6
84	July 6	@ Phillies	3–2	**Gray** (7–5)	Nola (5–6)	**Rainey** (12)	22,369	30–54	W1
85	July 7	@ Phillies	3–5	Nelson (3–1)	**Adon** (1–12)	Domínguez (3)	22,104	30–55	L1
86	July 8	@ Braves	2–12	Morton (5–3)	**Fedde** (5–6)	—	41,725	30–56	L2
87	July 9	@ Braves	3–4	Wright (10–4)	**Corbin** (4–11)	Minter (3)	40,632	30–57	L3
88	July 10	@ Braves	3–4 (12)	McHugh (2–1)	**Weems** (0–1)	—	32,053	30–58	L4
—	July 12	Mariners	Postponed (rain) Makeup on July 13						
89	July 13 (1)	Mariners	4–6	Flexen (6–8)	**Gray** (7–6)	Sewald (11)	16,260	30–59	L5
90	July 13 (2)	Mariners	1–2	Milone (1–1)	**Fedde** (5–7)	Sewald (12)	19,869	30–60	L6
91	July 14	Braves	4–5	Wright (11–4)	**Sánchez** (0–1)	Jansen (21)	25,577	30–61	L7
92	July 15	Braves	4–8	Anderson (8–5)	**Corbin** (4–12)	Minter (5)	30,409	30–62	L8
93	July 16	Braves	3–6	Fried (10–3)	**Espino** (0–3)	Jansen (22)	37,880	30–63	L9
94	July 17	Braves	7–3	**Cishek** (1–2)	Strider (4–3)	—	26,043	31–63	W1
**All–Star Break (July 18–21)**
95	July 22	@ Diamondbacks	1–10	Gallen (5–2)	**Corbin** (4–13)	—	17,819	31–64	L1
96	July 23	@ Diamondbacks	2–7	Bumgarner (6–9)	**Sánchez** (0–2)	—	37,802	31–65	L2
97	July 24	@ Diamondbacks	4–3	**Edwards Jr.** (3–3)	Mantiply (1–3)	**Finnegan** (2)	20,278	32–65	W1
98	July 25	@ Dodgers	4–1	**Machado** (1–0)	Gonsolin (11–1)	**Finnegan** (3)	48,647	33–65	W2
99	July 26	@ Dodgers	8–3	**Ramírez** (2–1)	Cleavinger (0–1)	—	53,302	34–65	W3
100	July 27	@ Dodgers	1–7	Vesia (3–0)	**Corbin** (4–14)	—	44,229	34–66	L1
101	July 29	Cardinals	2–6	Mikolas (8–8)	**Sánchez** (0–3)	—	30,170	34–67	L2
102	July 30	Cardinals	7–6	**Ramírez** (3–1)	Cabrera (3–2)	**Finnegan** (4)	34,440	35–67	W1
103	July 31	Cardinals	0–5	Pallante (4–4)	**Gray** (7–7)	—	28,738	35–68	L1

August: 9–18 (Home: 5–9; Away: 4–9)

#	Date	Opponent	Score	Win	Loss	Save	Attendance	Record	Streak
104	August 1	Mets	3–7	Scherzer (7–2)	**Corbin** (4–15)	—	29,034	35–69	L2
105	August 2	Mets	5–1	**Arano** (1–0)	Nogosek (0–1)	—	29,878	36–69	W1
106	August 3	Mets	5–9	Bassitt (8–7)	**Sánchez** (0–4)	—	27,851	36–70	L1
107	August 4	@ Phillies	4–5 (5)	Syndergaard (6–8)	**Espino** (0–4)	—	35,393	36–71	L2
108	August 5	@ Phillies	2–7	Gibson (7–4)	**Gray** (7–8)	—	22,024	36–72	L3
109	August 6	@ Phillies	5–11	Suárez (8–5)	**Corbin** (4–16)	—	27,078	36–73	L4
110	August 7	@ Phillies	1–13	Nola (8–8)	**Abbott** (0–1)	—	28,672	36–74	L5
111	August 8	@ Cubs	3–6	Thompson (9–5)	**Sánchez** (0–5)	Wick (5)	30,904	36–75	L6
112	August 9	@ Cubs	6–5	**Finnegan** (3–2)	Leiter Jr. (2–5)	**Edwards Jr.** (1)	37,193	37–75	W1
113	August 10	@ Cubs	2–4	Rucker (1–1)	**Cishek** (1–3)	Wick (6)	29,019	37–76	L1
114	August 12	Padres	5–10	Clevinger (4–4)	**Abbott** (0–2)	—	35,390	37–77	L2
115	August 13	Padres	4–3	**Finnegan** (4–2)	Darvish (10–6)	**Edwards Jr.** (2)	33,661	38–77	W1
116	August 14	Padres	0–6	Snell (5–6)	**Espino** (0–5)	—	27,498	38–78	L1
117	August 15	Cubs	5–4	**Edwards Jr.** (4–3)	Hughes (1–1)	**Finnegan** (5)	25,467	39–78	W1
118	August 16	Cubs	5–7 (11)	Hughes (2–1)	**Arano** (1–1)	Leiter Jr. (1)	26,362	39–79	L1
119	August 17	Cubs	2–3	Uelmen (1–1)	**McGee** (1–3)	Wick (8)	28,302	39–80	L2
120	August 18	@ Padres	3–1	**Edwards Jr.** (5–3)	Darvish (10–7)	**Finnegan** (6)	41,820	40–80	W1
121	August 19	@ Padres	6–3	**Ramírez** (4–1)	Hader (2–5)	**Finnegan** (7)	39,474	41–80	W2
122	August 20	@ Padres	1–2	Morejón (3–0)	**Cishek** (1–4)	García (3)	42,529	41–81	L1
123	August 21	@ Padres	1–2	Manaea (7–6)	**Corbin** (4–17)	Martinez (5)	38,253	41–82	L2
124	August 23	@ Mariners	2–4	Ray (10–8)	**Fedde** (5–8)	Sewald (16)	38,254	41–83	L3
125	August 24	@ Mariners	3–1	**Finnegan** (5–2)	Sewald (3–4)	—	21,035	42–83	W1
126	August 26	Reds	3–7	Minor (3–10)	**Cavalli** (0–1)	—	31,526	42–84	L1
127	August 27	Reds	2–6	Gibaut (1–0)	**Espino** (0–6)	Díaz (6)	30,325	42–85	L2
128	August 28	Reds	3–2	**Corbin** (5–17)	Lodolo (3–5)	**Finnegan** (8)	31,411	43–85	W1
129	August 30	Athletics	6–10	Irvin (7–11)	**Fedde** (5–9)	—	26,321	43–86	L1
130	August 31	Athletics	5–1	**Sánchez** (1–5)	Kaprielian (3–9)	—	26,416	44–86	W1

September: 10–16 (Home: 4–6; Away: 6–10)

#	Date	Opponent	Score	Win	Loss	Save	Attendance	Record	Streak
131	September 1	Athletics	7–5 (10)	**Harvey** (1–0)	Ruiz (0–1)	—	26,877	45–86	W2
132	September 2	@ Mets	3–7	Givens (7–3)	**Gray** (7–9)	—	33,630	45–87	L1
133	September 3	@ Mets	7–1	**Corbin** (6–17)	Ottavino (5–3)	—	33,509	46–87	W1
134	September 4	@ Mets	7–1	**Fedde** (6–9)	Carrasco (13–6)	—	31,711	47–87	W2
135	September 5	@ Cardinals	6–0	**Sánchez** (2–5)	Flaherty (0–1)	**Thompson** (1)	45,779	48–87	W3
136	September 6	@ Cardinals	1–4	Quintana (5–6)	**Espino** (0–7)	Helsley (14)	37,629	48–88	L1
137	September 7	@ Cardinals	5–6	Woodford (4–0)	**Finnegan** (5–3)	—	34,715	48–89	L2
138	September 8	@ Cardinals	11–6	**Thompson** (1–0)	Pallante (6–5)	—	40,437	49–89	W1
139	September 9	@ Phillies	3–5	Syndergaard (9–9)	**Corbin** (6–18)	Nelson (1)	22,304	49–90	L1
140	September 10	@ Phillies	5–8	Suárez (9–5)	**Fedde** (6–10)	—	37,185	49–91	L2
141	September 11	@ Phillies	5–7	Alvarado (4–2)	**Finnegan** (5–4)	Robertson (19)	23,802	49–92	L3
142	September 13	Orioles	3–4	Kremer (7–5)	**Harvey** (1–1)	Bautista (13)	31,679	49–93	L4
143	September 14	Orioles	2–6	Voth (5–2)	**Thompson** (1–1)	—	32,497	49–94	L5
144	September 16	Marlins	5–4	**Edwards Jr.** (6–3)	Sulser (1–4)	**Finnegan** (9)	24,931	50–94	W1
145	September 17	Marlins	5–3	**Harvey** (2–1)	Brigham (0–1)	**Finnegan** (10)	34,179	51–94	W2
146	September 18	Marlins	1–3	Alcántara (13–8)	**Sánchez** (2–6)	—	31,638	51–95	L1
147	September 19	@ Braves	2–5	Wright (19–5)	**Abbott** (0–3)	Jansen (35)	33,443	51–96	L2
148	September 20	@ Braves	2–3	Morton (9–6)	**Ramírez** (4–2)	Jansen (36)	40,224	51–97	L3
149	September 21	@ Braves	3–2	**Machado** (2–0)	Chavez (4–2)	**Finnegan** (11)	37,240	52–97	W1
150	September 23	@ Marlins	2–5	Garrett (3–6)	**Gray** (7–10)	Floro (6)	12,240	52–98	L1
151	September 24	@ Marlins	1–4	Alcántara (14–8)	**Fedde** (6–11)	Floro (7)	16,099	52–99	L2
152	September 25	@ Marlins	6–1	**Sánchez** (3–6)	Cabrera (6–4)	—	13,042	53–99	W1
153	September 26	Braves	0–8	Elder (2–3)	**Abbott** (0–4)	—	24,684	53–100	L1
154	September 27	Braves	2–8	McHugh (3–2)	**Espino** (0–8)	—	23,281	53–101	L2
155	September 28	Braves	3–2 (10)	**Finnegan** (6–4)	Stephens (3–3)	—	24,876	54–101	W1
156	September 30	Phillies	1–5	Falter (6–4)	**Fedde** (6–12)	—	24,682	54–102	L1
–	September 30	Phillies	Postponed (rain) Makeup on October 1						

October: 1–5 (Home: 1–2; Away: 0–3)

#	Date	Opponent	Score	Win	Loss	Save	Attendance	Record	Streak
157	October 1 (1)	Phillies	13–4	**Sánchez** (4–6)	Gibson (10–8)	—	29,808	55–102	W1
158	October 1 (2)	Phillies	2–8	Syndergaard (10–10)	**Romero** (1–1)	Sánchez (1)	36,841	55–103	L1
–	October 1	Phillies	Rescheduled (Hurricane Ian forecast) Moved to September 30						
159	October 2	Phillies	1–8 (6)	Wheeler (12–7)	**Corbin** (6–19)	—	32,779	55–104	L2
—	October 3	@ Mets	Postponed (rain) Makeup on October 4						
160	October 4 (1)	@ Mets	2–4	Ottavino (6–3)	**Abbott** (0–5)	Díaz (32)	see 2nd game	55–105	L3
161	October 4 (2)	@ Mets	0–8	Nogosek (1–1)	**Espino** (0–9)	—	23,649	55–106	L4
162	October 5	@ Mets	2–9	Williams (3–5)	**Fedde** (6–13)	—	27,298	55–107	L5

Legend: = Win = Loss = Postponement
Bold = Nationals team member

== Roster ==
2022 Washington Nationals
Roster
Pitchers: 77 Cory Abbott; 52,60 Joan Adon; 64 Víctor Arano; 54 Cade Cavalli; 33 Steve Cishek; 49 Sam Clay; 39 Tyler Clippard; 46 Patrick Corbin; 63 Sean Doolittle; 58 Carl Edwards Jr.; 30 Paolo Espino; 32 Erick Fedde; 67 Kyle Finnegan; 53 Reed Garrett; 40 Josiah Gray; 73 Hunter Harvey; 59 Evan Lee; 57 Andrés Machado; 47 Jake McGee; 52 Patrick Murphy; 65 Francisco Pérez; 21 Tanner Rainey; 61 Erasmo Ramírez; 13 Josh Rogers; 49 Tommy Romero; 19,27,45 Aaron Sanchez; 27 Aníbal Sánchez; 37 Stephen Strasburg; 72 Jackson Tetreault; 71 Mason Thompson; 50 Austin Voth; 51 Jordan Weems	Catchers: 15 Riley Adams; 38 Tres Barrera; 43 Israel Pineda; 20 Keibert Ruiz; Infielders: 5 CJ Abrams; 5 Ehire Adrianza; 19 Josh Bell; 3 Alcides Escobar; 26 Lucius Fox; 7 Maikel Franco; 2 Luis García Jr.; 1 César Hernández; 45 Joey Meneses; 9 Dee Strange-Gordon; 14 Ildemaro Vargas; 34 Luke Voit	Outfielders: 62 Alex Call; 29 Yadiel Hernández; 68 Josh Palacios; 16 Víctor Robles; 22 Juan Soto; 28 Lane Thomas; Other batters: 21,23 Nelson Cruz	Manager: 4 Dave Martinez; Coaches: 35 Henry Blanco (coaching/strategy); 24 Tim Bogar (bench); 25 Ricky Bones (bullpen); 6 Darnell Coles (hitting); 10 Gary DiSarcina (third base coach); 48 Jim Hickey (pitching); 87 Octavio Martinez (bullpen catcher); 66 Pat Roessler (assistant hitting); 85 Brandon Snyder (bullpen catcher); 12 Eric Young Jr. (first base coach)

== Statistics ==
=== Batting ===
(Final Stats)
Players in bold are on the active roster.
Note: G = Games played; AB = At bats; R = Runs; H = Hits; 2B = Doubles; 3B = Triples; HR = Home runs; RBI = Runs batted in; SB = Stolen bases; BB = Walks; K = Strikeouts; AVG = Batting average; OBP = On Base Percentage; SLG = Slugging Percentage; TB = Total Bases

Player	G	AB	R	H	2B	3B	HR	RBI	SB	BB	K	AVG	OBP	SLG	TB
**CJ Abrams**	44	159	17	41	7	2	0	10	6	1	23	.258	.276	.327	52
Riley Adams	48	142	14	25	4	0	5	10	0	12	46	.176	.245	.310	44
Ehire Adrianza	31	84	5	15	2	0	0	7	1	18	22	.179	.255	.202	17
Tres Barrera	19	50	2	9	1	0	0	4	0	2	16	.180	.212	.200	10
Josh Bell *	103	375	52	113	24	3	14	57	0	49	61	.301	.384	.493	185
**Alex Call**	35	102	16	25	3	1	5	13	3	11	26	.245	.330	.441	45
**Nelson Cruz**	124	448	50	105	16	0	10	64	4	49	119	.234	.313	.337	151
Alcides Escobar	40	124	12	27	4	2	0	8	1	5	32	.218	.260	.282	35
Lucius Fox	10	25	2	2	0	0	0	2	1	1	9	.080	.115	.080	2
Maikel Franco	103	371	31	85	15	0	9	39	1	12	75	.229	.255	.342	127
Luis García Jr.	93	360	29	99	23	2	7	45	3	11	84	.275	.295	.408	147
**César Hernández**	147	560	64	139	28	4	1	34	10	45	114	.248	.311	.318	178
Yadiel Hernández	94	305	30	82	16	0	9	41	2	19	74	.269	.312	.410	125
**Joey Meneses**	56	222	33	72	14	0	13	34	1	15	52	.324	.367	.563	125
Josh Palacios	29	47	8	10	2	0	0	2	1	1	15	.213	.245	.255	12
**Israel Pineda**	4	13	1	1	0	0	0	0	0	1	7	.077	.143	.077	1
Víctor Robles	132	366	42	82	10	2	6	33	15	17	104	.224	.273	.311	114
Keibert Ruiz	112	394	33	99	22	0	7	36	6	30	50	.251	.313	.360	142
Juan Soto *	101	342	62	84	17	1	21	46	6	91	62	.246	.408	.485	166
Dee Strange-Gordon	22	59	6	18	1	1	0	2	3	0	8	.305	.305	.356	21
**Lane Thomas**	146	498	62	120	26	2	17	52	8	41	132	.241	.301	.404	201
**Ildemaro Vargas**	53	186	15	52	13	0	3	19	3	5	21	.280	.308	.398	74
Luke Voit	53	202	17	46	4	0	9	21	0	16	69	.228	.295	.381	77
**TEAM TOTALS**	162	5434	603	1351	252	20	136	579	75	442	1221	.249	.310	.377	2051

=== Pitching ===
(Final Stats)
Players in bold are on the active roster.
Note: W = Wins; L = Losses; ERA = Earned run average; WHIP = Walks plus hits per inning pitched; G = Games pitched; GS = Games started; SV = Saves; IP = Innings pitched; H = Hits allowed; R = Runs allowed; ER = Earned runs allowed; BB = Walks allowed; K = Strikeouts

Player	W	L	ERA	WHIP	G	GS	SV	IP	H	R	ER	BB	K
**Cory Abbott**	0	5	5.25	1.44	16	9	0	48.0	44	30	28	25	45
Joan Adon	1	12	7.10	1.78	14	14	0	64.2	76	51	51	39	55
Ehire Adrianza	0	0	0.00	1.00	1	0	0	1.0	0	0	0	1	1
Víctor Arano	1	1	4.50	1.40	43	0	1	42.0	47	21	21	12	44
**Cade Cavalli**	0	1	14.54	1.85	1	1	0	4.1	6	7	7	2	6
Steve Cishek	1	4	4.21	1.22	69	0	1	66.1	54	31	31	27	74
Sam Clay	0	0	10.38	1.38	6	0	0	4.1	3	5	5	3	3
Tyler Clippard	0	0	7.20	2.00	4	0	0	5.0	6	4	4	4	4
Patrick Corbin	6	19	6.31	1.70	31	31	0	152.2	210	110	107	49	128
Sean Doolittle	0	0	0.00	0.19	6	0	0	5.1	1	0	0	0	6
Carl Edwards Jr.	6	3	2.76	1.23	57	0	2	62.0	51	19	19	25	56
Alcides Escobar	0	0	10.80	2.40	2	0	0	1.2	3	2	2	1	0
Paolo Espino	0	9	4.84	1.37	42	19	0	113.1	131	61	61	24	92
Erick Fedde	6	13	5.81	1.63	27	27	0	127.0	149	83	82	58	94
Kyle Finnegan	6	4	3.51	1.14	66	0	11	66.2	54	28	26	22	70
Reed Garrett	0	1	6.75	2.25	7	0	0	9.1	13	8	7	8	6
Josiah Gray	7	10	5.02	1.36	28	28	0	148.2	136	83	83	66	154
Hunter Harvey	2	1	2.52	1.14	38	0	0	39.1	33	11	11	12	45
Evan Lee	0	1	4.15	1.85	4	1	0	8.2	9	5	4	7	7
Andrés Machado	2	0	3.34	1.37	51	0	0	59.1	55	24	22	26	46
Jake McGee	0	1	6.30	1.20	12	0	0	10.0	7	7	7	5	10
Patrick Murphy	0	0	6.35	2.82	6	0	0	5.2	8	6	4	8	4
Francisco Pérez	0	0	7.27	2.54	10	0	0	8.2	13	7	7	9	7
Tanner Rainey	1	3	3.30	1.30	29	0	12	30.0	26	13	11	13	36
Erasmo Ramírez	4	2	2.92	1.08	60	2	0	86.1	79	30	28	14	61
Josh Rogers	2	2	5.13	1.33	16	3	0	26.1	24	15	15	11	12
Tommy Romero	0	1	14.73	3.27	1	1	0	3.2	8	8	6	4	2
Aaron Sanchez	3	3	8.33	1.70	7	7	0	31.1	47	30	29	8	16
Aníbal Sánchez	4	6	4.28	1.27	14	14	0	69.1	55	34	33	33	48
Dee Strange-Gordon	0	0	27.00	5.00	1	0	0	1.0	2	3	3	3	0
**Stephen Strasburg**	0	1	13.50	2.14	1	1	0	4.2	8	7	7	2	5
Jackson Tetreault	2	2	5.14	1.57	4	4	0	21.0	23	15	12	10	9
Mason Thompson	1	1	2.92	1.14	24	0	1	24.2	19	8	8	9	15
**Ildemaro Vargas**	0	0	0.00	0.00	1	0	0	1.0	0	0	0	0	0
Austin Voth	0	0	10.13	2.14	19	0	0	18.2	34	22	21	6	18
Jordan Weems	0	1	5.22	1.19	32	0	0	39.2	35	24	23	12	41
**TEAM TOTALS**	55	107	5.00	1.44	162	162	28	1411.2	1469	855	785	558	1220

== Farm system ==
Level	Team	League	Manager
Triple-A	Rochester Red Wings	International League	Matt LeCroy
Double-A	Harrisburg Senators	Eastern League	Tripp Keister
High-A	Wilmington Blue Rocks	South Atlantic League	Mario Lisson
Low-A	Fredericksburg Nationals	Carolina League	Jake Lowery
Rookie	FCL Nationals	Florida Complex League	Luis Ordaz
Rookie	DSL Nationals	Dominican Summer League	Sandy Martínez

== Broadcasting ==
The Nationals are minority owners of the Mid-Atlantic Sports Network, which they share with the Baltimore Orioles under an agreement brokered by Major League Baseball.

The Nationals brought back veteran play-by-play television commentator Bob Carpenter for the 2022 season as well as the 2023 season. Carpenter was paired with new color commentator Kevin Frandsen, who played for the Nationals during the 2014 season. Color analyst F. P. Santangelo, originally hired ahead of the 2011 season, parted ways with MASN and the Nationals following the 2021 season.

Dave Jageler and Charlie Slowes are calling their 17th consecutive season together as the Nationals' play-by-play radio commentators.
