= Joan Adon =

Dominican baseball player (born 1998)

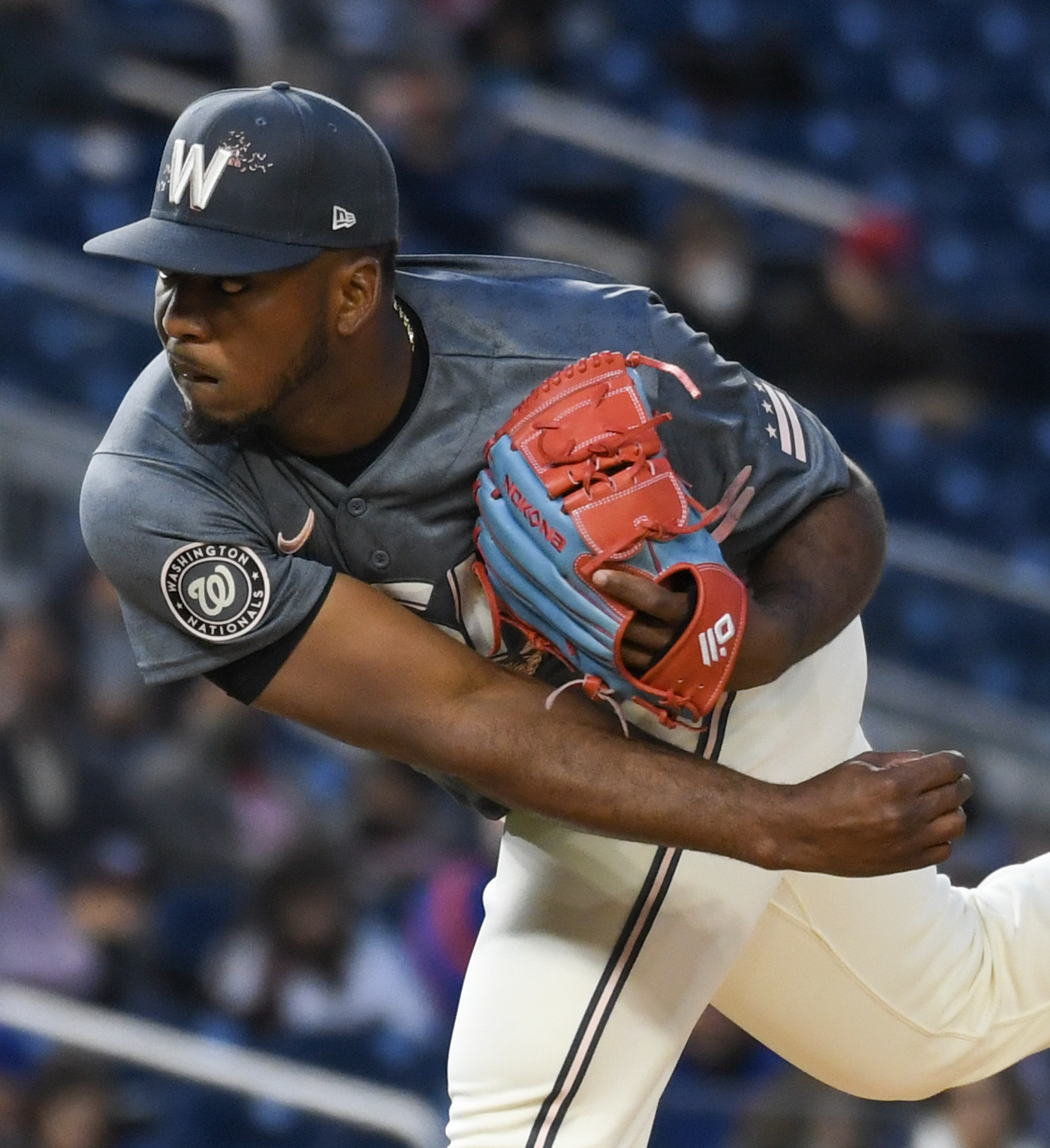
- Adon with the Nationals in 2022

Caliente de Durango – No. 20
- Pitcher
- Born: August 12, 1998 (age 28); Santo Domingo, Dominican Republic
- Bats: Right Throws: Right

MLB debut
- October 3, 2021, for the Washington Nationals

MLB statistics (through 2024 season)
- Win–loss record: 3–16
- Earned run average: 6.66
- Strikeouts: 118
- Stats at Baseball Reference

Teams
- Washington Nationals (2021–2024)

Joan Manuel Adon (born August 12, 1998) is a Dominican professional baseball pitcher for the Caliente de Durango of the Mexican League. He has previously played in Major League Baseball (MLB) for the Washington Nationals.

== Career ==
=== Washington Nationals ===
Adon signed with the Washington Nationals as an international free agent on July 2, 2016. He started his professional career with the Dominican Summer League Nationals in 2017. Adon split the 2018s season between the rookie–level Gulf Coast League Nationals and the Low–A Auburn Doubledays, going a combined 3–1 with a 4.11 ERA and 40 strikeouts over 30 2/3 innings. He spent the 2019 season with the Single–A Hagerstown Suns, going 11–3 with a 3.86 ERA and 90 strikeouts over 105 innings. In 2020, he was named to Washington's 60-man player pool, working out at the alternate training site in Fredericksburg, Virginia, during the coronavirus-shortened MLB season. On November 20, 2020, the Nationals added Adon to their 40-man roster to protect him from the Rule 5 draft.

Adon split the 2021 minor league season between the High–A Wilmington Blue Rocks, the Double–A Harrisburg Senators, and the Triple–A Rochester Red Wings, going a combined 7–6 with a 4.97 ERA and 122 strikeouts over 105 innings.

On October 3, 2021, Adon was promoted to the active roster to make his MLB debut against the Boston Red Sox. He pitched into the sixth inning, striking out nine, while giving up two earned runs: a fourth-inning solo homer by Rafael Devers, then a runner bequeathed to reliever Patrick Murphy who came around to score in the sixth. His nine strikeouts were the most by a pitcher making his MLB debut in the 2021 season.

Adon made the rotation to begin the 2022 season, despite only having made five starts above the High–A level. Adon was the first pitcher to record his 10th loss during the season, which happened on June 7 after a start against the Miami Marlins in which he yielded 8 runs in 3 innings pitched, his worst start of the season. After the game, he was optioned to Triple-A Rochester, as Stephen Strasburg came off the injured list on June 9 to take his place in the rotation. At the time, Adon was 1–10 with a 6.95 ERA and 1.76 WHIP in 12 starts, walking 5.66 batters per 9 innings, all league-worst totals among pitchers with at least 50 innings pitched. In addition, his whiff rate was the lowest in the major leagues, as batters made contact on 86.6% of their swings. His one win, his first in the major leagues, came in a start against the Arizona Diamondbacks on April 19, in which he threw 6 1/3 scoreless innings. Adon was brought back up to the major leagues to start the first game of a double-header against the Philadelphia Phillies on June 17, but after recording his 11th loss, Adon was sent back down to Triple-A the following day.

Adon was optioned to Triple–A Rochester to begin the 2024 season. In 8 games for Washington, he struggled to a 6.75 ERA with 6 strikeouts over 10 2/3 innings pitched. On August 28, 2024, Adon was placed on the injured list with a right biceps strain. He was transferred to the 60–day injured list on September 20, ending his season.

Adon was designated for assignment on January 8, 2025. He cleared waivers and was sent outright to Rochester on January 15. In 34 appearances for the Red Wings, Adon logged a 2–2 record and 5.70 ERA with 46 strikeouts across 42 2/3 innings pitched. He elected free agency following the season on November 6.

=== Caliente de Durango ===
On April 18, 2026, Adon signed with the Caliente de Durango of the Mexican League.

== Pitch types ==
Adon pitches with a fastball that averaged about 94 miles per hour (151 km/h) in his 2019 campaign with the Class-A Hagerstown Suns, as well as a slider and changeup, although his changeup was used sparingly at the time of his demotion from the big leagues in June 2022.
