= Paolo Espino =

Panamanian baseball player (born 1987)

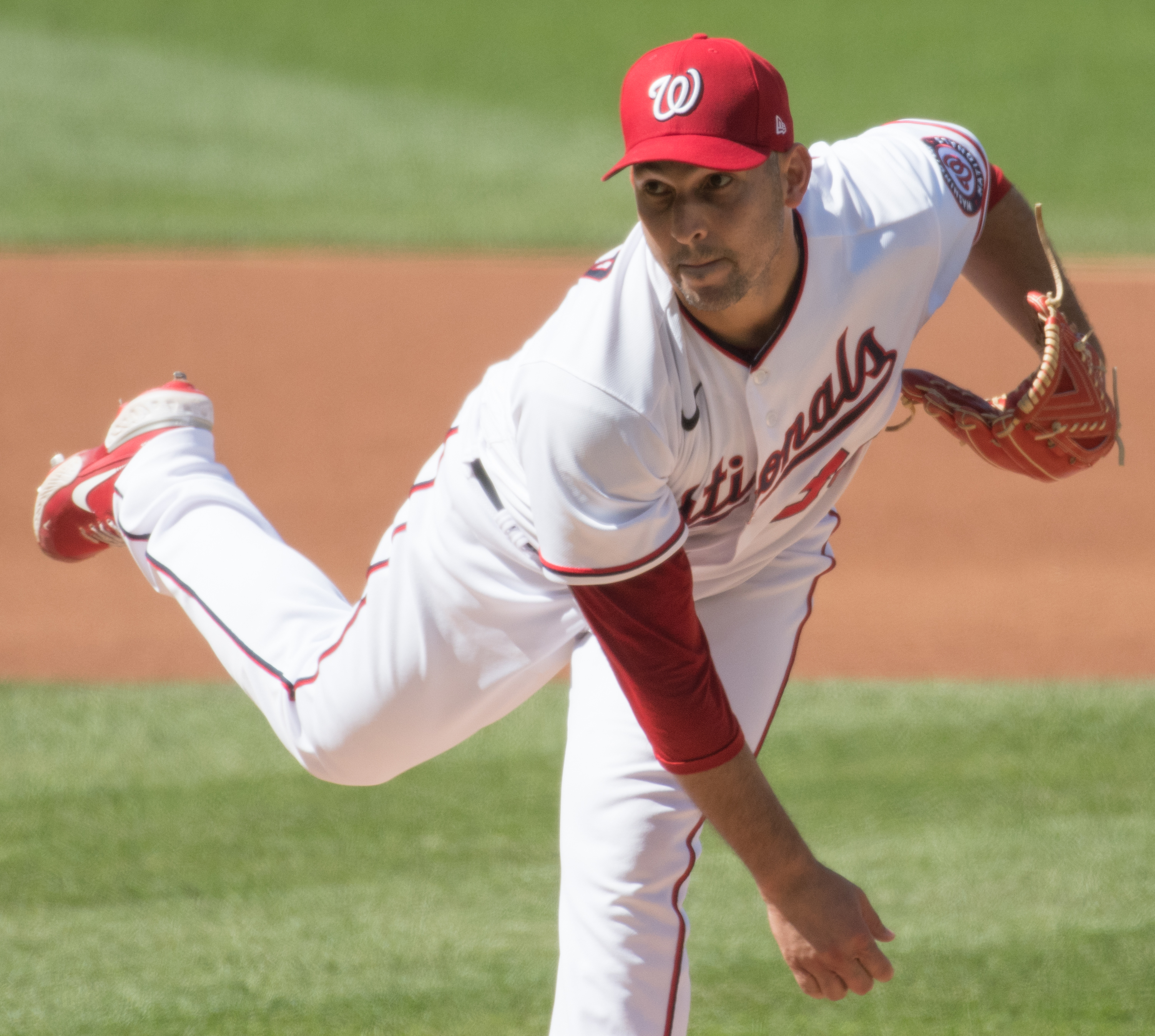
- Espino with the Washington Nationals in 2021
- Pitcher
- Born: January 10, 1987 (age 39); Panama City, Panama
- Batted: Right Threw: Right

MLB debut
- May 19, 2017, for the Milwaukee Brewers

Last MLB appearance
- July 31, 2024, for the Toronto Blue Jays

MLB statistics
- Win–loss record: 5–15
- Earned run average: 5.12
- Strikeouts: 217
- Stats at Baseball Reference

Teams
- Milwaukee Brewers (2017); Texas Rangers (2017); Washington Nationals (2020–2023); Toronto Blue Jays (2024)

Paolo Alesandro Espino Alonso (born January 10, 1987) is a Panamanian former professional baseball pitcher. He played parts of six seasons in Major League Baseball (MLB) for the Milwaukee Brewers, Texas Rangers, Washington Nationals, and Toronto Blue Jays from 2017 to 2024.

== Career ==
=== Cleveland Indians ===
Espino attended The Pendleton School in Bradenton, Florida. The Cleveland Indians selected him in the 10th round of the 2006 Major League Baseball draft. Espino began his professional career in 2007 with the Single-A Lake County Captains. He split the 2008 season between Lake County and the advanced Single-A Kinston Indians, registering a 5.54 ERA with 68 strikeouts between the two teams. In 2009, Espino appeared with Lake County, Kinston, and the Double-A Akron Aeros, notching a 11–8 record and 3.01 ERA in 28 games between the three clubs. In 2010, Espino spent the majority of the season in Akron, but also appeared in seven games for the Triple-A Columbus Clippers. Espino split the 2011 season between Columbus and Akron, pitching to a cumulative 2.77 ERA and 8–1 record. He spent the 2012 season in Akron, with the exception of 2 games played for Columbus, registering a 3.29 ERA and 7–4 record between the two. In 2013, he spent his fourth straight year split between Columbus and Akron, pitching to a 6–11 record and 4.72 ERA with 141 strikeouts. On November 4, 2013, Espino elected free agency.

=== Chicago Cubs ===
On November 18, 2013, Espino signed a minor league contract with the Chicago Cubs organization. Espino was released by the Cubs before the season began on March 27, 2014.

=== Washington Nationals ===
On April 10, 2014, Espino signed a minor league contract with the Washington Nationals organization and was assigned to the Double–A Harrisburg Senators to begin the season. He spent the season in Harrisburg, making one start for the Triple–A Syracuse Chiefs along the way, recording a cumulative 3.84 ERA and 6–5 record. He spent the majority of the 2015 season with Syracuse, also appearing in eight games for Harrisburg, pitching to a 3.47 ERA with 120 strikeouts.

Espino was invited to spring training with the Nationals in 2016. However, he did not make the major league club and was assigned to Syracuse, where he pitched to an 8–11 record and 3.30 ERA with 133 strikeouts across 26 games (24 starts). Espino elected free agency following the season on November 7, 2016.

=== Milwaukee Brewers ===
On November 10, 2016, Espino signed a minor league contract with the Milwaukee Brewers. On May 19, 2017, the Brewers selected Espino's contract to the active roster. Espino made his major league debut for the Brewers that day against the Chicago Cubs. Espino was designated for assignment by the Brewers on August 23, 2017, to make room on the 40-man roster for Aaron Brooks, who was claimed off waivers. In 17 2/3 innings for the Brewers in 2017, Espino allowed 12 earned runs and notched 13 strikeouts.

=== Texas Rangers ===
Espino was traded to the Texas Rangers on August 26, 2017 for cash considerations and was assigned to the Triple-A Round Rock Express. He pitched 6 1/3 innings for Texas in 2017, allowing 3 earned runs and notching 7 strikeouts. On October 10, Espino was outrighted off of the 40-man roster. He elected free agency following the season on November 6.

On December 22, 2017, Espino re-signed with the Rangers on a minor league contract. He was released by the organization on April 19, 2018.

=== Milwaukee Brewers (second stint) ===
On May 1, 2018, Espino signed a minor league deal with the Milwaukee Brewers. He spent the remainder of the season with the Triple-A Colorado Springs Sky Sox, posting a 4–5 record and 4.83 ERA with 52 strikeouts across 19 games (10 starts). Espino elected free agency following the season on November 2.

=== Washington Nationals (second stint) ===
On January 15, 2019, Espino signed a minor league deal with the Washington Nationals. He was assigned to the Triple-A Fresno Grizzlies to start the 2019 season, where he spent the entire year. In 17 starts, he worked to a 8-4 record and 5.65 ERA with 93 strikeouts. In 2020 he was invited to Spring Training with the Nationals, and was added to their initial 60-man player pool.

On September 21, 2020, Espino was selected to the 40-man and active rosters. In 2020 for the Nationals, Espino appeared in 2 games, allowing 3 earned runs in six innings with seven strikeouts. Espino was outrighted to the minor leagues on October 9, 2020, and elected free agency the next day.

Espino re-signed with the Nationals on a minor league contract on November 2, 2020. On April 18, 2021, Espino was selected to the active roster after Stephen Strasburg was placed on the injured list. On June 16, 2021, Espino won his first major league game, pitching five shutout innings in a 3–1 win over the Pittsburgh Pirates. On June 23, he earned his first major league save by pitching a scoreless bottom of the ninth inning in a 13–12 win against the Philadelphia Phillies. He finished the year appearing in 35 games, starting 19, and recording a 5-5 record and 4.27 ERA with 92 strikeouts in 109 2/3 innings pitched.

In 2022, Espino appeared in 42 games, starting 19, for the Nationals. He pitched to an 0-9 record and 4.84 ERA with 92 strikeouts in 113 1/3 innings of work. Espino was optioned to the Triple-A Rochester Red Wings to begin the 2023 season. He only made three appearances for Washington, surrendering 11 runs on 14 hits and three walks with three strikeouts across four innings of work. Espino was released by the Nationals on August 6, 2023.

=== Toronto Blue Jays ===
On December 24, 2023, Espino signed a minor league contract with the Toronto Blue Jays. On April 5, 2024, Espino had his contract selected to the major league roster. In 3 games (1 start) for Toronto, he posted an 8.31 ERA with 3 strikeouts over 8 2/3 innings pitched. Espino was designated for assignment following the acquisition of Dillon Tate on September 1. He cleared waivers and was sent outright to the Triple–A Buffalo Bisons on September 4. Espino elected free agency on October 2.

=== Conspiradores de Querétaro ===
On February 25, 2025, Espino signed with the Conspiradores de Querétaro of the Mexican League. In five starts for Querétaro, he struggled to a 1-3 record and 12.64 ERA with as many walks as strikeouts (11) over 15 2/3 innings pitched. Espino was released by the Conspiradores on May 12.

On March 7, 2026, Espino announced his retirement from professional baseball.

== Personal ==
Espino's cousin Damaso is a former professional baseball player, and is currently an international scout in the St. Louis Cardinals organization. The two were on Panama's roster for the 2009 World Baseball Classic.
