= Cory Abbott =

American baseball player (born 1995)

Free agent
- Pitcher
- Born: September 20, 1995 (age 31); San Diego, California, U.S.
- Bats: Right Throws: Right

MLB debut
- June 5, 2021, for the Chicago Cubs

MLB statistics (through 2023 season)
- Win–loss record: 1–7
- Earned run average: 6.02
- Strikeouts: 97
- Stats at Baseball Reference

Teams
- Chicago Cubs (2021); Washington Nationals (2022–2023)

Cory James Abbott (born September 20, 1995) is an American professional baseball pitcher who is a free agent. He has previously played in Major League Baseball (MLB) for the Chicago Cubs and Washington Nationals. He played college baseball at Loyola Marymount University, and was drafted by the Cubs in the second round of the 2017 MLB draft.

== Amateur career ==
Abbott attended Junipero Serra High School in San Diego, California. As a senior, he went 7–2 with a 1.52 earned run average (ERA).

Undrafted out of high school in the 2014 MLB draft, he enrolled and played college baseball at Loyola Marymount University. In 2016, he played collegiate summer baseball with the Orleans Firebirds of the Cape Cod Baseball League. As a junior in 2017, he went 11–2 with a 1.74 ERA in 15 starts, with 130 strikeouts (2nd in the conference) in 98 1/3 innings, and threw a perfect game. After the season, he was drafted by the Chicago Cubs in the second round of the 2017 Major League Baseball draft.

== Professional career ==
=== Chicago Cubs ===
Abbott signed with the Cubs and made his professional season with the Eugene Emeralds, compiling a 3.86 ERA over 14 innings. He pitched 2018 with the South Bend Cubs and Myrtle Beach Pelicans, going 8–6 with a 2.50 ERA in 22 starts, and 131 strikeouts in 115 innings, between the two clubs.

Abbott spent 2019 with the Double-A Tennessee Smokies, pitching to an 8–8 record with a 3.01 ERA over 26 starts, striking out 166 (leading the league) over 146 2/3 innings.

Abbott did not play in a game in 2020 due to the cancellation of the minor league season because of the COVID-19 pandemic. On November 20, 2020, the Cubs added Abbott to their 40-man roster to protect him from the Rule 5 draft.

On June 5, 2021, Abbott was promoted to the major leagues for the first time. He made his MLB debut that day, pitching two scoreless innings of relief against the San Francisco Giants. In the game, he also notched his first major league strikeout, punching out Giants pitcher Kevin Gausman. On June 20, the Cubs optioned Abbott to the Triple-A Iowa Cubs. On October 1, Abbott collected his first career hit, a single off of St. Louis Cardinals starter Dakota Hudson.

On April 16, 2022, Abbott was designated for assignment by the Cubs.

=== Washington Nationals ===
On April 21, 2022, Abbott was traded to the San Francisco Giants for cash considerations. Abbott was claimed off waivers by the Washington Nationals on May 4. He made 16 appearances (9 starts) for Washington down the stretch, posting an 0–5 record and 5.25 ERA with 45 strikeouts in 48 innings pitched.

Abbott was optioned to the Triple-A Rochester Red Wings to begin the 2023 season. In 22 games for the Nationals, he struggled to a 6.64 ERA with 40 strikeouts across 39 1/3 innings of work. On November 14, 2023, Abbott was designated for assignment by Washington after multiple prospects were added to the 40–man roster. He was non-tendered and became a free agent on November 17.

=== Seattle Mariners ===
On January 9, 2024, Abbott signed a minor league contract with the Seattle Mariners. He made one start for the Triple–A Tacoma Rainiers before being released by the Mariners organization on April 3.

=== Chicago White Sox ===
On April 12, 2024, Abbott signed a minor league contract with the Chicago White Sox. On July 1, Abbott was named the International League Pitcher of the Week. In 30 appearances for the Triple-A Charlotte Knights, he posted a 5–5 record and 5.80 ERA with 78 strikeouts across 71 1/3 innings pitched. Abbott elected free agency following the season on November 4.

=== Tecolotes de los Dos Laredos ===
On February 22, 2025, Abbott signed with the Tecolotes de los Dos Laredos of the Mexican League. In three starts for the Tecolotes, Abbott posted a 1–1 record and 2.40 ERA with 15 strikeouts over 15 innings of work.

=== Texas Rangers ===
On May 7, 2025, Abbott signed a minor league contract with the Texas Rangers. He made 20 appearances (17 starts) for the Triple-A Round Rock Express, posting a 3–4 record and 6.48 ERA with 91 strikeouts across 76 1/3 innings pitched. Abbott elected free agency following the season on November 6.
