= Jackson Tetreault =

American baseball player (born 1996)

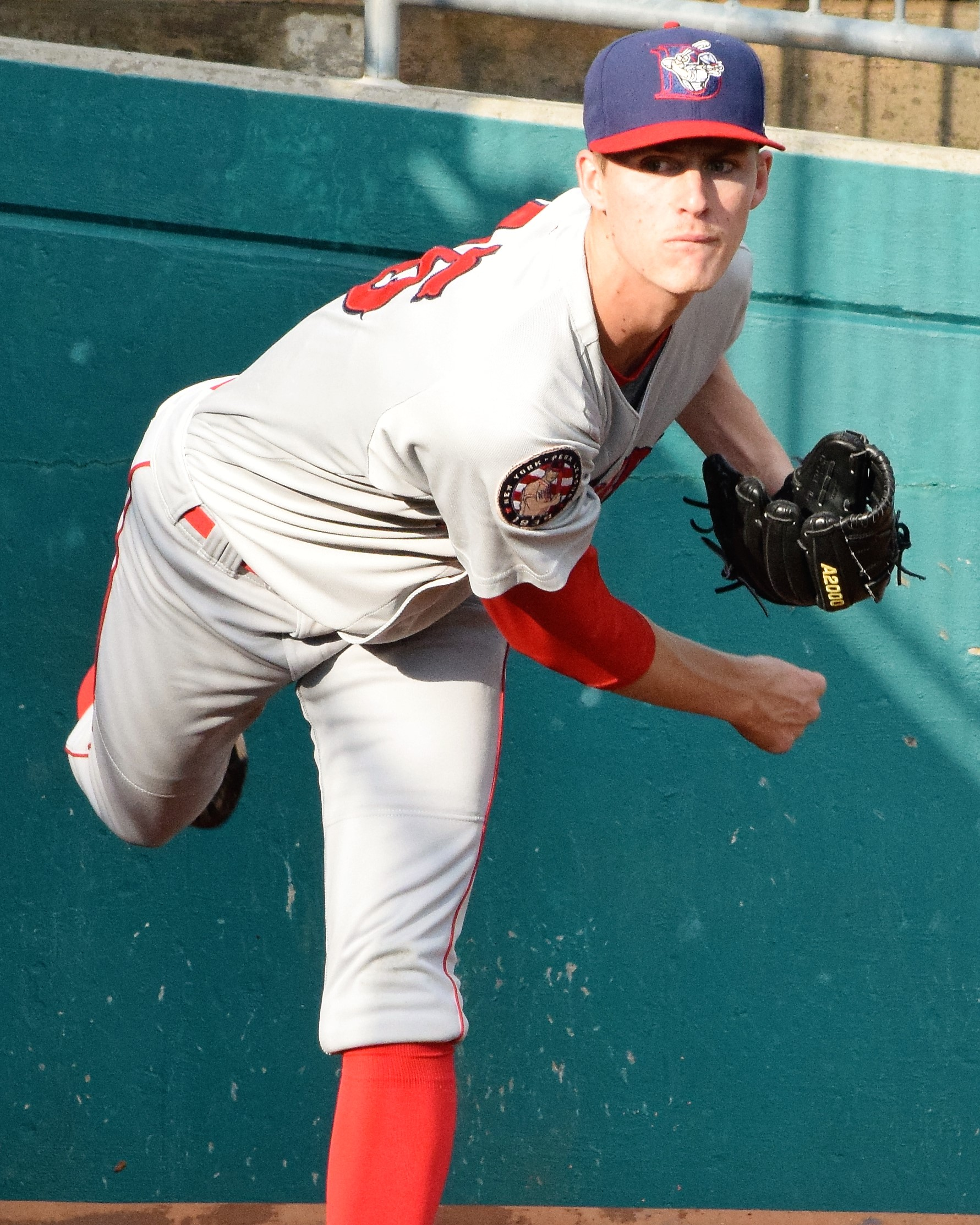
- Tetreault with the Auburn Doubledays in 2017

Piratas de Campeche – No. 78
- Pitcher
- Born: June 3, 1996 (age 29); Manchester, New Hampshire, U.S.
- Bats: Right Throws: Right

MLB debut
- June 14, 2022, for the Washington Nationals

MLB statistics (through 2022 season)
- Win–loss record: 2–2
- Earned run average: 5.14
- Strikeouts: 9
- Stats at Baseball Reference

Teams
- Washington Nationals (2022)

Jackson Tetreault (born June 3, 1996) is an American professional baseball pitcher for the Piratas de Campeche of the Mexican League. He has previously played in Major League Baseball (MLB) for the Washington Nationals.

== Career ==
A native of Ruskin, Florida, Tetreault attended Earl J. Lennard High School. His father, Curt Tetreault, was one of his baseball coaches, as well as a local tennis pro; he taught his son how to incorporate some of the mechanics of a tennis serve into his pitching windup, delivery, and followthrough. After high school, Tetreault pitched one season for Cameron University in Oklahoma before transferring back to the Tampa Bay Area to attend and play baseball at State College of Florida, Manatee–Sarasota.

=== Washington Nationals ===
The Washington Nationals drafted Tetreault in the seventh round, with the 223rd overall selection, of the 2017 Major League Baseball draft and signed him for a reported $300,000 bonus.

After pitching for the Gulf Coast League Nationals and Auburn Doubledays, short-season teams, during his first taste of professional baseball in 2017, Tetreault advanced to full-season ball by the 2018 season, which he split between the Single–A Hagerstown Suns and High–A Potomac Nationals. During the offseason, he lived in West Palm Beach, across the Florida peninsula from his hometown, to work out at the Nationals' spring training complex and prepare for the next season. Before the 2019 season, MLB Pipeline ranked him as the Nationals' 27th-best prospect. In late April 2019, the 22-year-old Tetreault was promoted to the Double–A Harrisburg Senators for the first time.

Tetreault did not play in a game in 2020 due to the cancellation of the minor league season because of the COVID-19 pandemic. In 2021, he made his Triple-A debut for the Rochester Red Wings.

Tetreault was promoted to the major leagues to make his debut against the Atlanta Braves on June 14, 2022. Tetreault pitched four innings, and took the loss, yielding seven runs on nine hits. On June 19, Tetreault earned his first career win against the Philadelphia Phillies, allowing zero earned runs (three earned) in seven innings pitched. On July 4, Tetreault was placed on the injured list with a stress fracture in his right scapula, and missed the remainder of the year. He was removed from the 40-man roster and sent outright to Triple–A on November 15.

Tetreault spent the 2023 season with the High–A Wilmington Blue Rocks, making only two starts and posting a 12.71 ERA with 4 strikeouts across 5 2/3 innings pitched. He elected free agency following the season on November 6, 2023.

=== Chicago Cubs ===
On May 25, 2024, Tetreault signed a minor league contract with the Chicago Cubs. In 8 appearances for the rookie–level Arizona Complex League Cubs, he posted a 5.19 ERA with 15 strikeouts across 8 2/3 innings of work. Tetreault was released by the Cubs organization on July 25.

=== Piratas de Campeche ===
On May 22, 2026, Tetreault signed with the Piratas de Campeche of the Mexican League.

== Pitching style ==
Tetreault stands 6 feet 5 inches (1.96 m) and has a lanky build. He throws a fastball in the low to mid-90s, a cutter, a curveball, and a changeup.
