= Francisco Pérez (baseball) =

Dominican baseball player (born 1997)

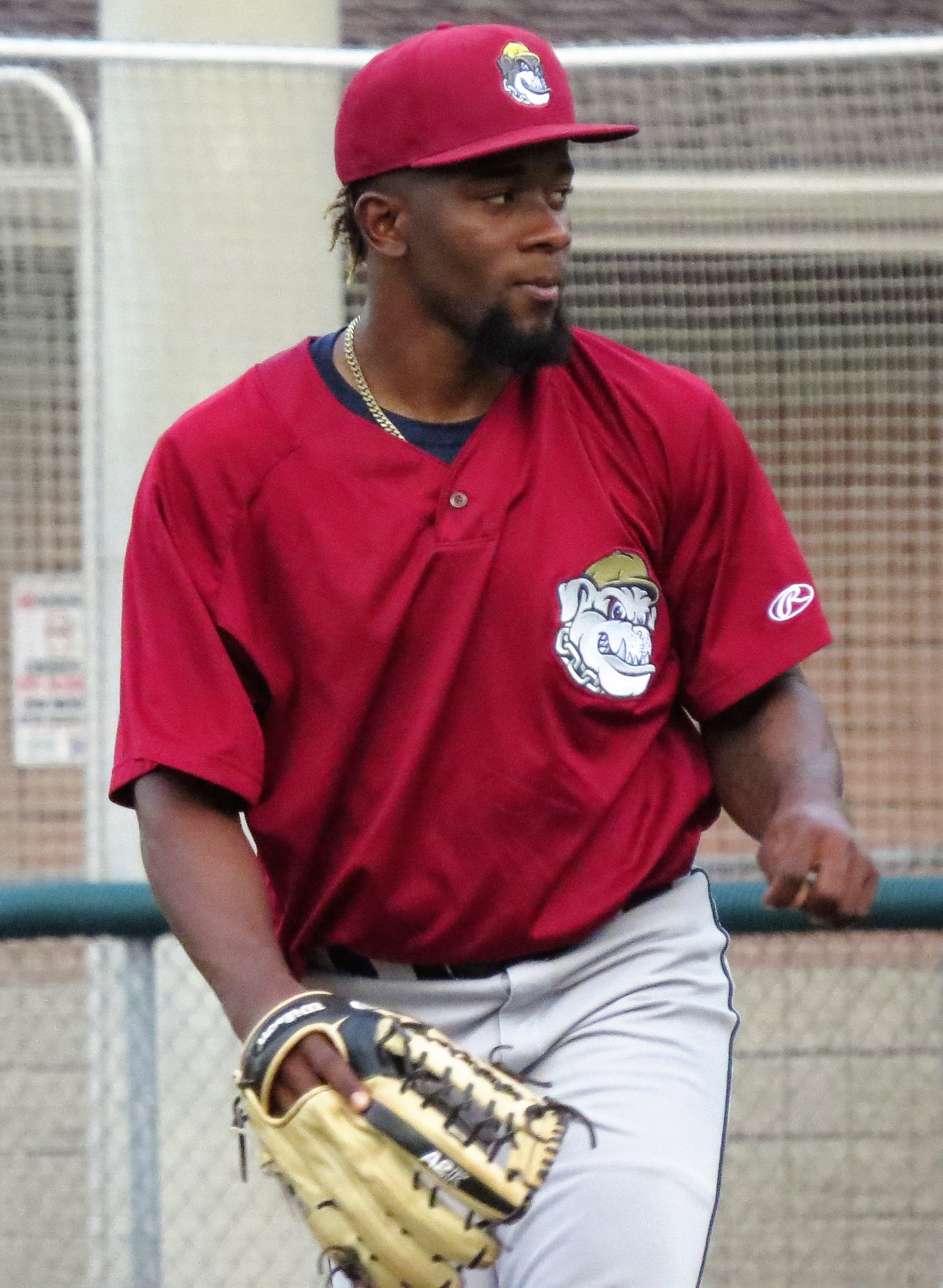
- Pérez with the Mahoning Valley Scrappers in 2017

Bravos de León – No. 64
- Pitcher
- Born: July 20, 1997 (age 29); Loma de Cabrera, Dominican Republic
- Bats: Switch Throws: Left

MLB debut
- August 12, 2021, for the Cleveland Indians

MLB statistics (through 2023 season)
- Win–loss record: 1–2
- Earned run average: 5.91
- Strikeouts: 26
- Stats at Baseball Reference

Teams
- Cleveland Indians (2021); Washington Nationals (2022); Oakland Athletics (2023)

Francisco Alberto Pérez (born July 20, 1997) is a Dominican professional baseball pitcher for the Bravos de León of the Mexican League. He has previously played in Major League Baseball (MLB) for the Cleveland Indians, Washington Nationals, and Oakland Athletics.

== Professional career ==
=== Cleveland Indians ===
Pérez signed with the Indians as an international free agent on December 12, 2014. He spent his first season in professional baseball with the Dominican Summer League Indians. Pérez spent the 2016 season with the Arizona League Indians, logging a 2.69 ERA in 12 games. The following season, Pérez played for the Low-A Mahoning Valley Scrappers, recording a 4–4 record and 3.28 ERA in 15 starts for the team. He spent the 2018 season with the Single-A Lake County Captains, pitching to an 8–10 record and 4.07 ERA with 111 strikeouts in 26 games (25 of them starts). Pérez only appeared in 8 games in 2019 due to injury and did not play in a game in 2020 due to the cancellation of the minor league season because of the COVID-19 pandemic.

Pérez began the 2021 season with the Akron RubberDucks of the Double-A Northeast and was promoted to the Columbus Clippers of the Triple-A East on June 20, 2021. The Indians called him up to the majors for the first time on August 9, 2021. Pérez made his major league debut on August 12, 2021, giving up three earned runs in 1 1/3 innings of relief. He finished out his rookie campaign with a 4.05 ERA in 4 major league games.

=== Washington Nationals ===
On November 5, 2021, the Washington Nationals claimed Pérez off waivers. Pérez made 10 appearances for Washington in 2022, struggling to a 7.27 ERA with 7 strikeouts and 9 walks in 8 2/3 innings pitched. On November 10, 2022, Pérez was removed from the 40-man roster and sent outright to the Triple-A Rochester Red Wings. He elected minor league free agency the same day.

On January 4, 2023, Pérez re-signed with the Nationals organization on a minor league contract. He spent spring training with the team, but did not make the team and was reassigned to minor-league camp. Pérez was later released by the organization on March 24.

=== Oakland Athletics ===
On April 21, 2023, Pérez signed a minor league contract with the Oakland Athletics organization. In 30 appearances split between the Double–A Midland RockHounds and Triple–A Las Vegas Aviators, he recorded a cumulative 4.43 ERA and 53 strikeouts in 40 2/3 innings of work. On August 12, Oakland selected Pérez's contract, adding him to the major league roster. In 17 games for the A's, he registered a 5.94 ERA with 14 strikeouts across 16 2/3 innings of work.

On February 1, 2024, Pérez was removed from the 40–man roster and sent outright to Triple–A. However, on February 7, Pérez rejected the assignment and elected free agency. He re-signed with the A's on a minor league contract the following day. Pérez split the year between Las Vegas and the rookie-level Arizona Complex League Athletics, accumulating a 2–2 record and 7.22 ERA with 57 strikeouts across 38 2/3 innings pitched. He elected free agency following the season on November 4.

=== Bravos de León ===
On April 14, 2026, Pérez signed with the Bravos de León of the Mexican League.
