= Israel Pineda =

Venezuelan baseball player (born 2000)

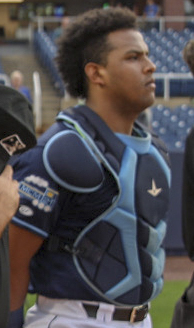
- Pineda with the Wilmington Blue Rocks in 2021

Caciques de Distrito – No. 22
- Catcher
- Born: April 3, 2000 (age 25); Maracay, Aragua, Venezuela
- Bats: Right Throws: Right

MLB debut
- September 11, 2022, for the Washington Nationals

MLB statistics (through 2022 season)
- Batting average: .077
- Home runs: 0
- Runs batted in: 0
- Stats at Baseball Reference

Teams
- Washington Nationals (2022)

Israel Abrahan Pineda (born April 3, 2000) is a Venezuelan professional baseball catcher for the Caciques de Distrito of the Venezuelan Major League. He made his Major League Baseball (MLB) debut for the Washington Nationals in 2022.

== Career ==
=== Washington Nationals ===
==== Minor leagues ====
A native of Maracay, Pineda signed with Washington as an international amateur free agent in 2016 for a reported $450,000 bonus. He made his professional debut for the Gulf Coast League Nationals in 2017 and advanced to the New York–Penn League's Auburn Doubledays in 2018. He was named a New York–Penn League All-Star during the 2018 season, hitting .273 with four home runs during the short season.

By midway through the 2018 season, Pineda was generating some buzz as a rising prospect in the Nationals organization, with a Mid-Atlantic Sports Network writer suggesting he was on track to becoming a top-five organizational prospect. Before the 2019 season, Pineda was ranked by MLB Pipeline as the Nationals' eighth-best prospect and top overall catching prospect. He did not play a minor league game in 2020 due to the cancellation of the minor league season because of the COVID-19 pandemic.

In 2021, Pineda participated in major league spring training with the Nationals, hitting a home run in his final game. He was assigned to the High-A Wilmington Blue Rocks to begin the season. Pineda was used as a "taxi squad" player by the Surprise Saguaros of the Arizona Fall League in 2021, one of eight Nationals prospects assigned to Surprise.

Pineda advanced rapidly in the 2022 season, rising from High-A Wilmington to the Double-A Harrisburg Senators and then the Triple-A Rochester Red Wings.

==== Major leagues ====
After Nationals catcher Keibert Ruiz was injured, Pineda was selected to the roster for the first time, making his major league debut and first career start against the Philadelphia Phillies on September 11, 2022. On October 5, Pineda collected his first career hit, a line drive single off of New York Mets pitcher Trevor Williams.

Pineda suffered a finger fracture in spring training in 2023 and was placed on the injured list to begin the season. On May 23, 2023, he began a rehab assignment with High–A Wilmington. However, he suffered a left oblique strain while on the assignment and was transferred to the 60-day injured list on July 19. On August 6, he was activated and subsequently optioned to Double–A Harrisburg. On January 27, 2024, Pineda was designated for assignment following the signing of Joey Gallo. He cleared waivers and was outrighted to Triple–A Rochester on February 2. On November 6, he elected free agency.

=== Caciques de Distrito ===
On May 18, 2025, Pineda signed with the Caciques de Distrito of the Venezuelan Major League.
