= Cade Cavalli =

American baseball player (born 1998)

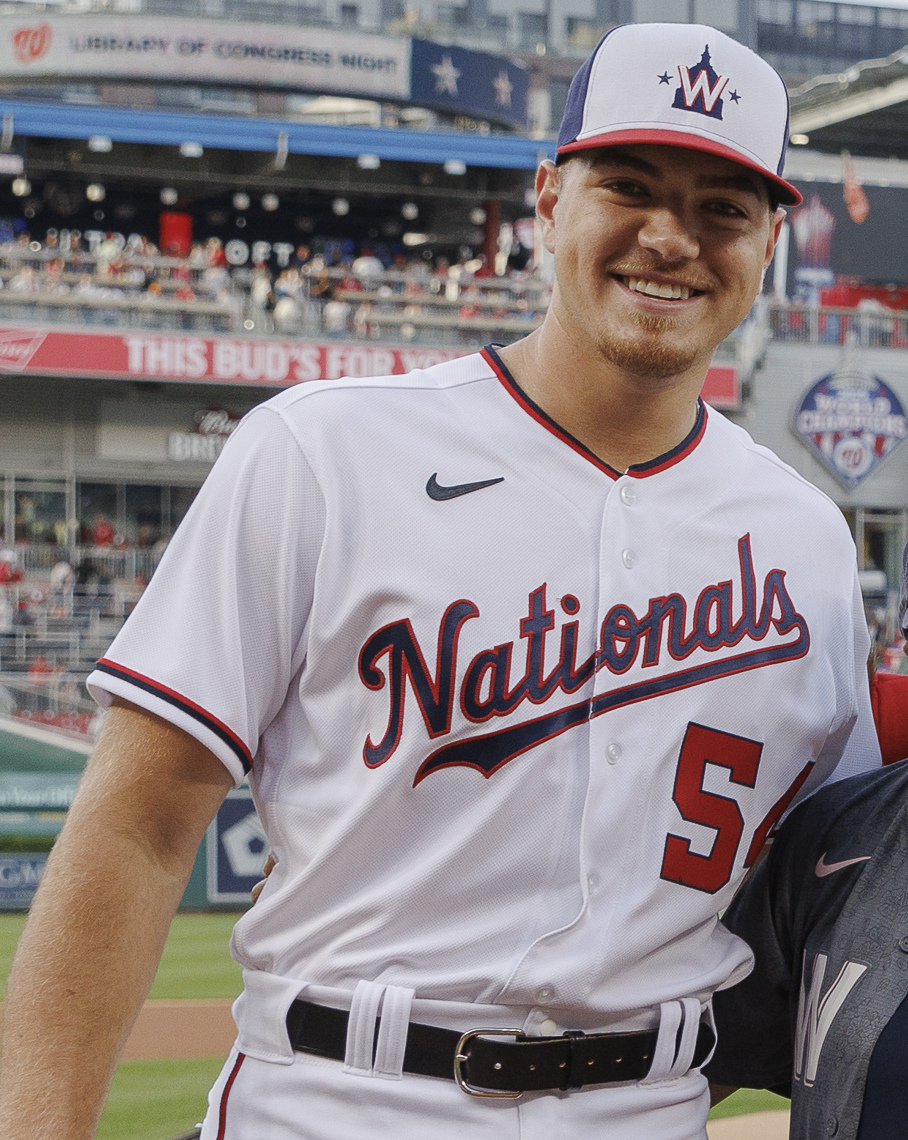
- Cavalli with the Washington Nationals in 2022

Washington Nationals – No. 24
- Pitcher
- Born: August 14, 1998 (age 28); Tulsa, Oklahoma, U.S.
- Bats: Right Throws: Right

MLB debut
- August 26, 2022, for the Washington Nationals

MLB statistics (through 2026 season)
- Win–loss record: 16–7
- Earned run average: 3.52
- Strikeouts: 246
- Stats at Baseball Reference

Teams
- Washington Nationals (2022, 2025–present)

Steven Cade Cavalli (born August 14, 1998) is an American professional baseball pitcher for the Washington Nationals of Major League Baseball (MLB). He was selected 22nd overall by the Nationals in the 2020 MLB draft and made his MLB debut in 2022.

== Amateur career ==
Cavalli attended Bixby High School in Bixby, Oklahoma, where he played baseball. In 2016, his junior year, he had a 7–1 win–loss record with a 2.02 earned run average (ERA) along with a .416 batting average, four home runs and 47 runs batted in (RBIs) at the plate. He missed a majority of his senior season in 2017 due to a back injury. He was selected by the Atlanta Braves in the 29th round of the 2017 Major League Baseball draft, but did not sign and instead enrolled at the University of Oklahoma where he played college baseball.

In 2018, Cavalli's freshman year for the Oklahoma Sooners, he pitched to a 6.75 ERA over 17 1/3 innings while hitting .202 with six home runs and 28 RBIs over 58 games. After the 2018 season, he played collegiate summer baseball with the Wareham Gatemen of the Cape Cod Baseball League. As a sophomore in 2019, Cavalli pitched to a 5–3 record and a 3.28 ERA over 12 starts along with batting .319 with four home runs and 17 RBIs in 19 games. He missed three weeks during the season due to soreness. That summer, he played for the United States collegiate national baseball team. Cavalli entered his junior year in 2020 as a top prospect for the upcoming draft and was named the Big 12 Conference Preseason Pitcher of the Year. He made four starts in which he compiled a 4.18 ERA and 37 strikeouts over 23 2/3 innings before the college baseball season was cut short due to the COVID-19 pandemic.

== Professional career ==
=== Early career ===
The Washington Nationals selected Cavalli in the first round, with the 22nd overall selection, in the 2020 Major League Baseball draft, and he signed for a $3 million signing bonus. He did not play a minor league game in 2020 due to the cancellation of the minor league season caused by the COVID-19 pandemic.

To begin the 2021 season, Cavalli was assigned to the Wilmington Blue Rocks of the High-A East with whom he made his professional debut. After pitching to a 3–1 record and 1.77 ERA over 40 2/3 innings, he was promoted to the Harrisburg Senators of the Double-A Northeast on June 14. That same month, Cavalli was selected to play in the All-Star Futures Game at Coors Field. In mid-August, after starting 11 games and going 3–3 with a 2.79 ERA and 80 strikeouts over 58 innings with Harrisburg, Cavalli was promoted to the Rochester Red Wings of the Triple-A East. Over six starts with Rochester, he went 1–5 with 7.30 ERA. His total of 175 strikeouts for the season between the three clubs led the minor leagues.

=== 2022 season: MLB debut ===
Cavalli returned to Rochester in the International League to begin the 2022 season. He was selected to represent the Nationals at the 2022 All-Star Futures Game.

On August 26, 2022, the Nationals selected Cavalli's contract for him to make his MLB debut that night at Nationals Park in Washington, D.C., versus the Cincinnati Reds. He pitched 4 1/3 innings and allowed seven runs, six hits, and two walks while striking out six and hitting three batters in a 7–3 loss. Suffering from right shoulder inflammation, he did not pitch again during 2022.

=== 2023 season ===
Cavalli reported for spring training with the Nationals in West Palm Beach, Florida in 2023, contending for a spot in the starting rotation. While pitching against the New York Mets on March 14, 2023, however, he sprained the ulnar collateral ligament of the elbow in his pitching arm and had to undergo Tommy John surgery, ending his 2023 season.

=== 2024 season ===
After a lengthy recovery from surgery, Cavalli returned to the mound during the second half of the 2024 season. However, a case of influenza and problems with "dead arm" limited him to three appearances all season — one with the Single-A Fredericksburg Nationals in the Carolina League and two with Wilmington in the South Atlantic League — during which he pitched 8 1/3 innings and posted an overall ERA of 2.18 with no decisions. Although he was finally healthy by the end of the 2024 minor-league season, he did not join the Washington Nationals during 2024.

=== 2025 season ===
Cavalli spent the 2024–25 offseason on a regular throwing plan, then joined the Nationals for spring training in 2025. He began the 2025 season with Rochester and made 17 appearances with the Red Wings, all starts, posting a record of 4–7 with a 5.35 ERA in 74 innings. His performance at Rochester improved as the 2025 season wore on: During his last four outings, he recorded 25 strikeouts over 20 1/3 innings, and in his final two starts, totaling 10 innings, he did not walk a batter. The Nationals called him up, and on August 6, 2025, he made his second major-league appearance, 1,076 days since his first one. Starting against the Athletics at Nationals Park, he pitched 4 1/3 scoreless innings, throwing 88 pitches, and allowing three hits and one walk in a 2–1 Nationals victory. His four-seam fastball averaged 97.3 mph (156.6 km/h), and one four-seamer reached 100.1 mph (161.1 km/h). He struck out six, making him the sixth pitcher in Nationals team history to record 12 or more strikeouts in his first two appearances. Cavalli got his first major league win on August 16 against the Philadelphia Phillies, pitching seven innings, allowing seven hits, and striking out five batters in a 2–0 Nationals victory at Nationals Park. Cavalli made a total of 10 starts for the Nationals during the 2025 season and posted a 3–1 record, a 4.25 ERA, and 40 strikeouts across 48 2/3 innings.

=== 2026 season ===
Cavalli was named Washington's Opening Day starter to open the 2026 season.

During a start against the Boston Red Sox on June 30, 2026, Cavalli struck out Willson Contreras, then shouted at Contreras while he was walking back to the dugout. Red Sox interim manager Chad Tracy said he heard Cavalli yell "sit down, boy." In the United States, "boy" has a racially-charged history, previously used as a disparaging term for Black men. Cavalli and Contreras exchanged more words after the shout by Cavalli, and the benches of both teams cleared, with Contreras throwing his batting helmet in Cavalli's direction. Contreras, alongside manager Tracy as well as Red Sox outfielder Nate Eaton and Nationals pitcher Miles Mikolas were ejected. In an interview after the game, Cavalli was asked multiple times about what he told Contreras, and did not recount using the word “boy.” The following day, Cavalli apologized, saying "I’m extremely torn up about the way that things were perceived" and "obviously, there was no ill intention behind that." When asked by the media if he understood the history behind the word, Cavalli said "there’s a history behind that word, and that’s just something that as a competitor, like in football or basketball, playing wiffle ball with my brother, you don’t understand it," and "it’ll never happen again." On July 2, he was suspended by MLB for seven games.

On September 18, Cavalli signed a contract extension with Washington, buying out his arbitration seasons and what would have been his first free agent season, plus a team option for his 2031 season. The contract extension was reportedly valued at $47 million, rising to $70 million if the Nationals exercise the option.
