= Alberto Baldonado =

Panamanian baseball player (born 1993)

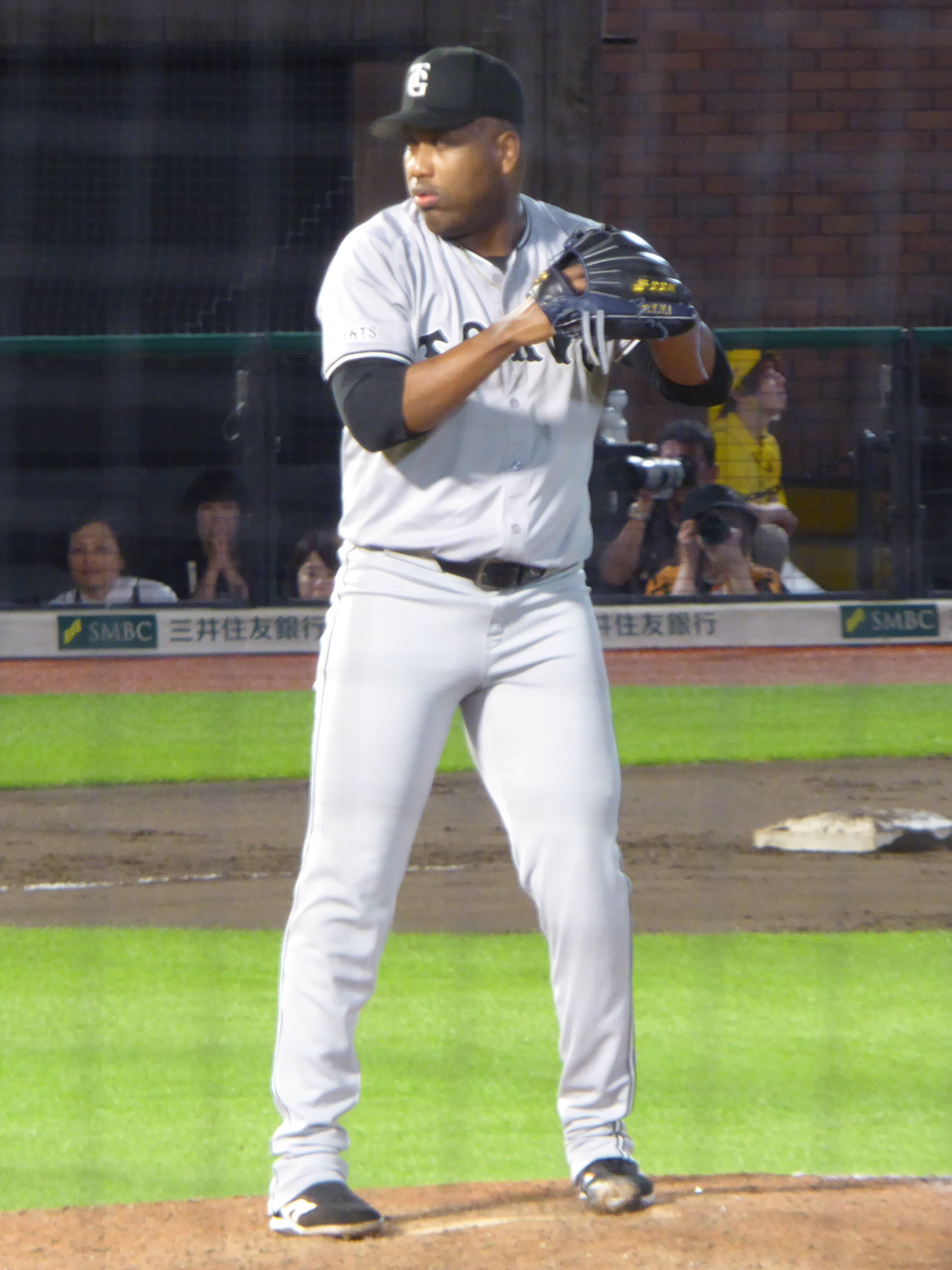
- Baldonado with the Yomiuri Giants in 2024

Yomiuri Giants – No. 49
- Pitcher
- Born: February 1, 1993 (age 33); Colón, Panama
- Bats: Left Throws: Left

Professional debut
- MLB: September 2, 2021, for the Washington Nationals
- NPB: July 15, 2023, for the Yomiuri Giants

MLB statistics (through 2021 season)
- Win–loss record: 0–1
- Earned run average: 8.44
- Strikeouts: 12

NPB statistics (through August 18, 2026)
- Win–loss record: 5–4
- Earned run average: 2.56
- Strikeouts: 98
- Saves: 9
- Stats at Baseball Reference

Teams
- Washington Nationals (2021); Yomiuri Giants (2023–present)

Alberto Louis Baldonado (born February 1, 1993) is a Panamanian professional baseball pitcher for the Yomiuri Giants of Nippon Professional Baseball (NPB). He has previously played in Major League Baseball (MLB) for the Washington Nationals.

== Career ==
=== New York Mets ===
A native of Colón, Panama, Baldonado signed with the New York Mets as a non-drafted free agent in 2010 and was assigned to the Dominican Summer League Mets 1 team. Baldonado played for the GCL Mets in 2011, posting a 3.71 ERA in 11 games. Baldonado spent the ensuing two seasons with the rookie-level Kingsport Mets, posting a 6.75 ERA in 6 games (2012) and a 3.94 ERA in 14 games (2013). In 2014, he played for the Low-A Brooklyn Cyclones, working to a 3–4 record and 4.34 ERA in 12 contests. Baldonado spent the following year with the Single-A Savannah Sand Gnats, working to an excellent 1.91 ERA with 74 strikeouts in 56.2 innings pitched across 38 appearances. He split the 2016 season with the High-A St. Lucie Mets and the Double-A Binghamton Mets, logging a cumulative 3.77 ERA with 68 strikeouts in 47 total appearances. In 2017, Baldonado played for the Double-A Binghamton Rumble Ponies and the Triple-A Las Vegas 51s, accumulating a 4.80 ERA in 50 appearances between the two affiliates. On November 6, 2017, Baldonado became a minor league free agent, at age 24.

=== Chicago Cubs ===
On December 11, 2017, Baldonado signed a minor league deal that included an invitation to major league spring training with the Chicago Cubs for the 2018 season. He spent the season with the Triple-A Iowa Cubs and was named a Pacific Coast League All-Star after pitching to a 4.88 ERA in 37 games. Baldonado started the 2019 season with Triple-A Iowa as well, but he was released on May 17, 2019, after posting a 3.38 ERA over eight games.

=== High Point Rockers ===
On June 16, 2019, Baldonado latched on with the High Point Rockers of the independent Atlantic League of Professional Baseball, for whom he pitched in 13 games, recording a 1.98 ERA with 19 strikeouts in 13 contests.

=== Sultanes de Monterrey ===
On July 30, 2019, Baldonado's contract was selected by the Sultanes de Monterrey of the Mexican League. With Monterrey, Baldonado worked to a 1.59 ERA in 12 appearances to close out the year. On January 21, 2020, Baldonado elected free agency.

=== Washington Nationals ===
On February 7, 2020, Baldonado signed a minor league contract with the Washington Nationals. Baldonado did not play in a game in 2020 due to the cancellation of the minor league season because of the COVID-19 pandemic. Baldonado was released by the Nationals organization on May 29.

On January 6, 2021, Baldonado re-signed with the Nationals on a new minor league contract. He began the 2021 season with the Double-A Harrisburg Senators, progressing then to the Triple-A Rochester Red Wings. After putting up a 2.88 ERA across the two levels, Baldonado had his contract selected September 1, and was promoted to the major leagues for the first time. Baldonado made his major league debut against the Philadelphia Phillies on September 2, pitching a scoreless inning of relief. He struck out the first batter he faced, Matt Vierling, as well as the fourth, Bryce Harper. Baldonado finished his rookie campaign with an 8.44 ERA with 12 strikeouts in 14 major league games. On October 13, Baldonado was outrighted off of the 40-man roster.

In 2022, Baldonado made 56 appearances for Triple–A Rochester, recording a 3.84 ERA with 81 strikeouts and 3 saves across 63 1/3 innings pitched. He returned to Rochester in 2023, pitching in 29 contests and logging a 3.03 ERA with 30 strikeouts in 29 2/33 innings of work. On June 20, 2023, Baldonado was released by the Nationals organization to pursue an opportunity in Japan.

=== Yomiuri Giants ===
On July 1, 2023, Baldonado signed with the Yomiuri Giants of Nippon Professional Baseball (NPB). He re-signed a one-year contract for the 2024 season on November 26.

== International career ==
Baldonado was selected to represent Panama at the 2023 World Baseball Classic qualification.
