= 2022 Atlanta Braves season =

2022 Atlanta Braves
- National League East champions
- League: National League
- Division: East
- Ballpark: Truist Park
- City: Atlanta
- Record: 101–61 (.623)
- Divisional place: 1st
- Owners: Liberty Media/John Malone
- President: Derek Schiller
- General manager: Alex Anthopoulos
- Manager: Brian Snitker
- Television: Bally Sports Southeast; Bally Sports South (Chip Caray, Jeff Francoeur, Paul Byrd, Tom Glavine, Dale Murphy, Joe Simpson, Kelly Crull)
- Radio: 680 The Fan; Rock 100.5; Atlanta Braves Radio Network (Ben Ingram, Jim Powell, Joe Simpson); 1600 La Mejor (Daniel Cantú, Emanuel Zamarrón)

The 2022 Atlanta Braves season was the 152nd season of the Atlanta Braves franchise, the 57th in Atlanta, and the Braves' sixth season at Truist Park. The Braves were managed by Brian Snitker, in his seventh season as the team’s manager.

The Braves entered the season as the defending World Series champions after defeating the Houston Astros in the 2021 World Series and were attempting to become the first to repeat as champions since the 2000 New York Yankees.

On December 2, 2021, Commissioner of Baseball Rob Manfred announced a lockout of players, following the expiration of the collective bargaining agreement (CBA) between Major League Baseball (MLB) and the Major League Baseball Players Association (MLBPA). On March 10, 2022, MLB and the MLBPA agreed to a new collective bargaining agreement, ending the lockout. Opening Day was played on April 7. Although MLB originally announced that several series would be canceled due to the lockout, the agreement ultimately provided for a full 162-game season, with originally canceled games being made up via doubleheaders.

After a slow start in the first two months of the season, the Braves exploded in June, starting the month off with a 14-game winning streak. In their final series at home during the regular season, the Braves swept their division rival, the New York Mets, taking a 2-game lead and the head-to-head tiebreaker over the team that once led them by 10.5 games for first place in the division, the whole season, and season series 9–7. In their second-to-last game of the regular season, the Braves clinched their fifth straight National League East title. This season marked the first time since 2003 that the Braves finished with more than 100 wins. However, they were upset by their division rival Philadelphia Phillies in the National League Division Series, losing in four games.

== Offseason ==
=== Lockout ===
The expiration of the league's collective bargaining agreement (CBA) with the Major League Baseball Players Association occurred on December 1, 2021 with no new agreement in place. As a result, the team owners voted unanimously to lockout the players stopping all free agency and trades.

The parties came to an agreement on a new CBA on March 10, 2022.

=== Rule changes ===
Pursuant to the new CBA, several new rules were instituted for the 2022 season. The National League will adopt the designated hitter full-time, a draft lottery will be implemented, the postseason will expand from ten teams to twelve, and advertising patches will appear on player uniforms and helmets for the first time.

=== Transactions ===
==== November ====
- November 15 – Manny Piña signed to a two-year, $16 million contract.
- November 29 – Kirby Yates signed to a two-year, $8.25 million contract.

==== March ====
- March 14 – Matt Olson acquired from the Oakland Athletics in exchange for Cristian Pache, Shea Langeliers, Ryan Cusick, and Joey Estes.
- March 15 – Collin McHugh signed to a two-year, $10 million contract.
- March 16 - Eddie Rosario signed to a two-year contract. Alex Dickerson signed to a one-year, non-guaranteed contract.

== Roster ==
2022 Atlanta Braves
Roster
Pitchers: 36 Ian Anderson; 61 Silvino Bracho; 60 Jesse Chavez; 49 Jesús Cruz; 64 Tucker Davidson; 55 Bryce Elder; 54 Max Fried; 26 Raisel Iglesias; 45 Jay Jackson; 74 Kenley Jansen; 52 Dylan Lee; 68 Tyler Matzek; 32 Collin McHugh; 33 A. J. Minter; 50 Charlie Morton; 66 Kyle Muller; 15 Sean Newcomb; 56 Darren O'Day; 12 Jake Odorizzi; 51 Will Smith; 53 Jackson Stephens; 65 Spencer Strider; 67 Freddy Tarnok; 63 Tyler Thornburg; 78 William Woods; 30 Kyle Wright; 22 Kirby Yates; 19 Huascar Ynoa; 63 Danny Young	Catchers: 24 William Contreras; 16 Travis d'Arnaud; 9 Manny Piña; 60 Chadwick Tromp; Infielders: 17 Ehire Adrianza; 1 Ozzie Albies; 11 Orlando Arcia; 46 Rylan Bannon; 22 Robinson Canó; 34 Mike Ford; 15 Phil Gosselin; 18 Vaughn Grissom; 28 Matt Olson; 27 Austin Riley; 7 Dansby Swanson	Outfielders: 13 Ronald Acuña Jr.; 48 Travis Demeritte; 25 Alex Dickerson; 14 Adam Duvall; 15 Robbie Grossman; 23 Michael Harris II; 38 Guillermo Heredia; 20 Marcell Ozuna; 8 Eddie Rosario	Manager: 43 Brian Snitker; Coaches: 59 José Castro (assistant hitting); 57 Sal Fasano (catching coach); 58 Drew French (bullpen); 10 Chipper Jones (hitting consultant); 39 Rick Kranitz (pitching); 97 Jimmy Leo (bullpen catcher); 70 Bobby Magallanes (assistant hitting); 95 Eddie Pérez (assistant); 98 Tomás Pérez (batting practice pitcher); 34 Kevin Seitzer (hitting); 37 Ron Washington (third base); 4 Walt Weiss (bench); 99 José Yepez (bullpen catcher); 2 Eric Young Sr. (first base)

== Standings ==
=== National League East ===
NL East
Team	W	L	Pct.	GB	Home	Road
Atlanta Braves	101	61	.623	—	55‍–‍26	46‍–‍35
New York Mets	101	61	.623	—	54‍–‍27	47‍–‍34
Philadelphia Phillies	87	75	.537	14	47‍–‍34	40‍–‍41
Miami Marlins	69	93	.426	32	34‍–‍47	35‍–‍46
Washington Nationals	55	107	.340	46	26‍–‍55	29‍–‍52

=== National League Wild Card ===
Division leaders
Team	W	L	Pct.
Los Angeles Dodgers	111	51	.685
Atlanta Braves	101	61	.623
St. Louis Cardinals	93	69	.574

Wild Card teams (Top 3 teams qualify for postseason)
Team	W	L	Pct.	GB
New York Mets	101	61	.623	+14
San Diego Padres	89	73	.549	+2
Philadelphia Phillies	87	75	.537	—
Milwaukee Brewers	86	76	.531	1
San Francisco Giants	81	81	.500	6
Arizona Diamondbacks	74	88	.457	13
Chicago Cubs	74	88	.457	13
Miami Marlins	69	93	.426	18
Colorado Rockies	68	94	.420	19
Pittsburgh Pirates	62	100	.383	25
Cincinnati Reds	62	100	.383	25
Washington Nationals	55	107	.340	32

== Record vs. opponents ==
2022 National League record Source: MLB Standings Grid – 2022
Team	AZ	ATL	CHC	CIN	COL	LAD	MIA	MIL	NYM	PHI	PIT	SD	SF	STL	WSH	AL
Arizona	—	2–4	4–3	3–4	9–10	5–14	5–1	4–3	2–4	3–3	4–3	5–14	10–9	2–5	4–3	12–8
Atlanta	4–2	—	3–3	4–3	6–1	2–4	13–6	3–3	10–9	11–8	7–0	3–4	4–3	4–3	14–5	13–7
Chicago	3–4	3–3	—	11–8	3–4	0–7	4–2	10–9	4–3	6–0	10–9	2–5	2–5	6–13	4–2	6–14
Cincinnati	4–3	3–4	8–11	—	2–4	0–7	4–3	6–13	1–5	1–6	7–12	0–6	4–2	7–12	3–4	12–8
Colorado	10–9	1–6	4–3	4–2	—	8–11	2–4	3–4	2–5	2–5	3–3	10–9	5–14	2–4	3–4	9–11
Los Angeles	14–5	4–2	7–0	7–0	11–8	—	6–1	4–3	3–4	3–4	1–5	14–5	15–4	4–2	3–3	15–5
Miami	1–5	6–13	2–4	3–4	4–2	1–6	—	4–3	6–13	7–12	4–3	3–4	3–4	2–4	15–4	8–12
Milwaukee	3–4	3–3	9–10	13–6	4–3	3–4	3–4	—	2–4	2–4	11–8	3–4	3–4	9–10	3–3	15–5
New York	4–2	9–10	3–4	5–1	5–2	4–3	13–6	4–2	—	14–5	6–1	2–4	4–3	5–2	14–5	9–11
Philadelphia	3–3	8–11	0–6	6–1	5–2	4–3	12–7	4–2	5–14	—	6–1	4–3	1–5	4–3	16–3	9–11
Pittsburgh	3–4	0–7	9–10	12–7	3–3	5–1	3–4	8–11	1–6	1–6	—	2–4	1–5	6–13	4–3	4–16
San Diego	14–5	4–3	5–2	6–0	9–10	5–14	4–3	4–3	4–2	3–4	4–2	—	13–6	2–4	4–3	8–12
San Francisco	9–10	3–4	5–2	2–4	14–5	4–15	4–3	4–3	3–4	5–1	5–1	6–13	—	3–4	4–2	10–10
St. Louis	5–2	3–4	13–6	12–7	4–2	2–4	4–2	10–9	2–5	3–4	13–6	4–2	4–3	—	4–3	10–10
Washington	3–4	5–14	2–4	4–3	4–3	3–3	4–15	3–3	5–14	3–16	3–4	3–4	2–4	3–4	—	8–12

Updated with the results of all games through October 5, 2022.

== Regular season game log ==
On March 10, 2022, MLB and MLBPA agreed to a new collective bargaining agreement, thus ending the lockout. Opening Day is scheduled for April 7. Although MLB previously announced that several series would be cancelled due to the lockout, the agreement provides for a 162-game season, with originally canceled games to be made up via doubleheaders. Spring training is to begin on March 17.

2022 Game Log: 101–61 (Home: 55–26; Away: 46–35)
April: 10–12 (Home: 6–7; Away: 4–5)

#	Date	Opponent	Score	Win	Loss	Save	Attendance	Record	Streak
1	April 7	Reds	3–6	Mahle (1–0)	**Fried** (0–1)	Santillan (1)	40,545	0–1	L1
2	April 8	Reds	7–6	**Morton** (1–0)	Sanmartin (0–1)	—	40,234	1–1	W1
3	April 9	Reds	2–1	**Wright** (1–0)	Gutiérrez (0–1)	**Smith** (1)	40,310	2–1	W2
4	April 10	Reds	3–6	Greene (1–0)	**Anderson** (0–1)	Warren (1)	38,233	2–2	L1
5	April 11	Nationals	2–11	Rogers (1–0)	**Ynoa** (0–1)	—	42,263	2–3	L2
6	April 12	Nationals	16–4	**Elder** (1–0)	Corbin (0–2)	**Stephens** (1)	31,462	3–3	W1
7	April 13	Nationals	1–3	Gray (1–1)	**Fried** (0–2)	Rainey (2)	31,959	3–4	L1
8	April 14	@ Padres	1–12	Musgrove (1–0)	**Morton** (1–1)	—	44,844	3–5	L2
9	April 15	@ Padres	5–2	**O'Day** (1–0)	Johnson (0–1)	**Jansen** (1)	41,993	4–5	W1
10	April 16	@ Padres	5–2	**Anderson** (1–1)	Martinez (0–1)	**Jansen** (2)	36,924	5–5	W2
11	April 17	@ Padres	1–2	Darvish (1–1)	**Elder** (1–1)	Rogers (4)	37,694	5–6	L1
12	April 18	@ Dodgers	4–7	Kershaw (2–0)	**Ynoa** (0–2)	Kimbrel (3)	52,052	5–7	L2
13	April 19	@ Dodgers	3–1	**Fried** (1–2)	Buehler (1–1)	**Jansen** (3)	51,889	6–7	W1
14	April 20	@ Dodgers	1–5	Gonsolin (1–0)	**Morton** (1–2)	—	38,888	6–8	L1
15	April 22	Marlins	3–0	**Wright** (2–0)	Rogers (0–3)	**Jansen** (4)	40,402	7–8	W1
16	April 23	Marlins	7–9	Okert (2–0)	**Strider** (0–1)	Scott (1)	41,931	7–9	L1
17	April 24	Marlins	4–5	Luzardo (1–1)	**Elder** (1–2)	Head (1)	38,440	7–10	L2
18	April 26	Cubs	3–1	**Fried** (2–2)	Stroman (0–3)	**Jansen** (5)	31,990	8–10	W1
19	April 27	Cubs	3–6 (10)	Robertson (1–0)	**Matzek** (0–1)	Wick (1)	30,392	8–11	L1
20	April 28	Cubs	5–1	**Wright** (3–0)	Smyly (1–2)	—	34,183	9–11	W1
21	April 29	@ Rangers	6–3	**Anderson** (2–1)	Richards (0–1)	**Jansen** (6)	25,829	10–11	W2
22	April 30	@ Rangers	1–3	Dunning (1–1)	**Elder** (1–3)	Barlow (1)	36,097	10–12	L1

May: 13–15 (Home: 8–7; Away: 5–8)

#	Date	Opponent	Score	Win	Loss	Save	Attendance	Record	Streak
23	May 1	@ Rangers	3–7	Hearn (1–2)	**Muller** (0–1)	—	38,316	10–13	W1
24	May 2	@ Mets	5–2	**Fried** (3–2)	Bassitt (3–2)	**Jansen** (7)	23,413	11–13	W2
25	May 3	@ Mets	4–5	Peterson (1–0)	**Morton** (1–3)	Díaz (5)	see 2nd game	11–14	L1
26	May 3	@ Mets	0–3	Carrasco (2–1)	**Wright** (3–1)	Lugo (2)	27,206	11–15	L2
27	May 4	@ Mets	9–2	**Anderson** (3–1)	Megill (4–1)	—	23,973	12–15	W1
28	May 6	Brewers	3–6	Lauer (3–0)	**McHugh** (0–1)	Hader (11)	36,307	12–16	L1
29	May 7	Brewers	3–2	**Fried** (4–2)	Burnes (1–2)	**Jansen** (8)	37,857	13–16	W1
30	May 8	Brewers	9–2	**Morton** (2–3)	Ashby (0–3)	—	36,551	14–16	W2
31	May 10	Red Sox	4–9	Danish (1–0)	**Wright** (3–2)	Schreiber (1)	38,378	14–17	L1
32	May 11	Red Sox	5–3	**Jansen** (1–0)	Brasier (0–1)	—	37,200	15–17	W1
33	May 13	Padres	6–11	García (1–2)	**Smith** (0–1)	Rogers (13)	40,635	15–18	L1
34	May 14	Padres	6–5	**Jansen** (2–0)	Wilson (3–1)	—	40,490	16–18	W1
35	May 15	Padres	3–7 (11)	Crismatt (2–0)	**Stephens** (0–1)	—	40,114	16–19	L1
36	May 16	@ Brewers	0–1	Peralta (3–1)	**Anderson** (3–2)	Hader (14)	25,880	16–20	L2 6
37	May 17	@ Brewers	3–0	**Davidson** (1–0)	Houser (3–4)	**Jansen** (9)	28,910	17–20	W1
38	May 18	@ Brewers	6–7 (11)	Kelley (1–0)	**Chavez** (0–1)	—	27,014	17–21	L1
39	May 20	@ Marlins	5–3	**Morton** (3–3)	Rogers (2–5)	**Smith** (2)	9,776	18–21	W1
40	May 21	@ Marlins	4–3	**Wright** (4–2)	Hernández (2–4)	**Jansen** (10)	13,264	19–21	W2
41	May 22	@ Marlins	3–4	Alcántara (4–2)	**Anderson** (3–3)	—	17,908	19–22	L1
42	May 23	Phillies	3–7	Wheeler (3–3)	**Davidson** (1–1)	—	41,762	19–23	L2
43	May 24	Phillies	6–5	**Jansen** (3–0)	Nelson (1–1)	—	32,274	20–23	W1
44	May 25	Phillies	8–4	**Strider** (1–1)	Alvarado (0–2)	—	29,339	21–23	W2
45	May 26	Phillies	1–4	Nola (2–4)	**Wright** (4–3)	—	33,188	21–24	L1
46	May 27	Marlins	6–4	**Stephens** (1–1)	Bass (1–2)	**Jansen** (11)	40,064	22–24	W1
47	May 28	Marlins	1–4	Alcántara (5–2)	**Davidson** (1–2)	Sulser (2)	40,682	22–25	L1
48	May 29	Marlins	6–3	**Fried** (5–2)	Hernández (2–5)	**Jansen** (12)	39,669	23–25	W1
49	May 30	@ Diamondbacks	2–6	Gallen (4–0)	**Strider** (1–2)	—	20,735	23–26	L1
50	May 31	@ Diamondbacks	7–8 (10)	Melancon (1–5)	**Stephens** (1–2)	—	12,686	23–27	L2

June: 21–6 (Home: 10–3; Away: 11–3)

#	Date	Opponent	Score	Win	Loss	Save	Attendance	Record	Streak
51	June 1	@ Diamondbacks	6–0	**Wright** (5–3)	Bumgarner (2–4)	—	12,370	24–27	W1
52	June 2	@ Rockies	13–6	**Anderson** (4–3)	Gomber (2–6)	—	26,594	25–27	W2
53	June 3	@ Rockies	3–1 (10)	**Minter** (1–0)	Estévez (1–2)	**Jansen** (13)	37,336	26–27	W3
54	June 4	@ Rockies	6–2 (11)	**Minter** (2–0)	Chacín (3–2)	—	41,054	27–27	W4
55	June 5	@ Rockies	8–7	**Morton** (4–3)	Feltner (1–2)	**Jansen** (14)	39,409	28–27	W5
56	June 7	Athletics	3–2	**Wright** (6–3)	Trivino (1–4)	**Jansen** (15)	33,981	29–27	W6
57	June 8	Athletics	13–2	**Anderson** (5–3)	Koenig (0–1)	—	42,075	30–27	W7
58	June 9	Pirates	3–1	**Fried** (6–2)	Brubaker (0–6)	**Jansen** (16)	39,336	31–27	W8
59	June 10	Pirates	4–2	**Strider** (2–2)	Contreras (1–1)	**Jansen** (17)	41,404	32–27	W9
60	June 11	Pirates	10–4	**Chavez** (1–1)	Underwood Jr. (0–2)	—	41,219	33–27	W10
61	June 12	Pirates	5–3	**Wright** (7–3)	Quintana (1–4)	**Jansen** (18)	35,446	34–27	W11
62	June 13	@ Nationals	9–5	**Lee** (1–0)	Ramírez (1–1)	—	20,571	35–27	W12
63	June 14	@ Nationals	10–4	**Fried** (7–2)	Tetreault (0–1)	**Stephens** (2)	24,490	36–27	W13
64	June 15	@ Nationals	8–2	**Strider** (3–2)	Fedde (4–5)	—	21,153	37–27	W14
65	June 17	@ Cubs	0–1	Martin (1–0)	**Minter** (2–1)	Robertson (8)	35,676	37–28	L1
66	June 18	@ Cubs	3–6	Steele (2–5)	**Wright** (7–4)	—	40,755	37–29	L2
67	June 19	@ Cubs	6–0	**Anderson** (6–3)	Hendricks (2–6)	—	40,369	38–29	W1
68	June 20	Giants	2–1	**Jansen** (4–0)	Doval (2–3)	—	40,589	39–29	W2
69	June 21	Giants	10–12	Rogers (1–3)	**O'Day** (1–1)	—	35,384	39–30	L1
70	June 22	Giants	4–3	**Minter** (3–1)	McGee (1–2)	—	38,478	40–30	W1
71	June 23	Giants	7–6	**Wright** (8–4)	Wood (5–6)	**Jansen** (19)	36,870	41–30	W2
72	June 24	Dodgers	1–4	Urías (5–6)	**Anderson** (6–4)	Kimbrel (13)	42,105	41–31	L1
73	June 25	Dodgers	5–3	**Minter** (4–1)	Graterol (2–3)	**Jansen** (20)	42,161	42–31	W1
74	June 26	Dodgers	3–5 (11)	Kimbrel (1–3)	**O'Day** (1–2)	Graterol (1)	42,217	42–32	L1
75	June 28	@ Phillies	5–3	**McHugh** (1–1)	Bellatti (1–3)	**Minter** (1)	27,725	43–32	W1
76	June 29	@ Phillies	4–1	**Wright** (9–4)	Suárez (6–5)	**Smith** (3)	25,621	44–32	W2
77	June 30	@ Phillies	4–14	Nola (5–5)	**Anderson** (6–5)	—	30,131	44–33	L1

July: 18–8 (Home: 12–4; Away: 6–4)

#	Date	Opponent	Score	Win	Loss	Save	Attendance	Record	Streak
78	July 1	@ Reds	9–1	**Fried** (8–2)	Minor (1–5)	—	28,606	45–33	W1
79	July 2	@ Reds	4–1	**Strider** (4–2)	Mahle (3–7)	**Smith** (4)	26,755	46–33	W2
80	July 3	@ Reds	3–4	Strickland (1–2)	**Minter** (4–2)	—	21,418	46–34	L1
81	July 4	Cardinals	6–3	**O'Day** (2–2)	Hudson (6–5)	**Smith** (5)	41,975	47–34	W1
82	July 5	Cardinals	7–1	**Anderson** (7–5)	Pallante (2–4)	—	35,656	48–34	W2
83	July 6	Cardinals	3–0	**Fried** (9–2)	Mikolas (5–7)	**Minter** (2)	36,718	49–34	W3
84	July 7	Cardinals	2–3 (11)	Helsley (5–1)	**Matzek** (0–2)	Naughton (1)	37,756	49–35	L1
85	July 8	Nationals	12–2	**Morton** (5–3)	Fedde (5–6)	—	41,725	50–35	W1
86	July 9	Nationals	4–3	**Wright** (10–4)	Corbin (4–11)	**Minter** (3)	40,632	51–35	W2
87	July 10	Nationals	4–3 (12)	**McHugh** (2–1)	Weems (0–1)	—	32,053	52–35	W3
88	July 11	Mets	1–4	Scherzer (6–1)	**Fried** (9–3)	Díaz (19)	42,925	52–36	L1
89	July 12	Mets	4–1	**Matzek** (1–2)	Peterson (5–2)	**Minter** (4)	42,217	53–36	W1
90	July 13	Mets	3–7	Bassitt (7–6)	**Morton** (5–4)	—	34,879	53–37	L1
91	July 14	@ Nationals	5–4	**Wright** (11–4)	Sánchez (0–1)	**Jansen** (21)	25,577	54–37	W1
92	July 15	@ Nationals	8–4	**Anderson** (8–5)	Corbin (4–12)	**Minter** (5)	30,409	55–37	W2
93	July 16	@ Nationals	6–3	**Fried** (10–3)	Espino (0–3)	**Jansen** (22)	37,880	56–37	W3
94	July 17	@ Nationals	3–7	Cishek (1–2)	**Strider** (4–3)	—	26,043	56–38	L1
–	July 19	**92nd All-Star Game: Los Angeles, CA**							
95	July 22	Angels	8–1	**Lee** (2–0)	Ohtani (9–5)	—	42,867	57–38	W1
96	July 23	Angels	7–2	**Wright** (12–4)	Sandoval (3–6)	—	42,827	58–38	W2
97	July 24	Angels	1–9	Detmers (3–3)	**Anderson** (8–6)	—	42,663	58–39	L1
98	July 25	@ Phillies	4–6	Bellatti (2–3)	**Minter** (4–3)	Domínguez (5)	25,452	58–40	L2
99	July 26	@ Phillies	6–3	**Strider** (5–3)	Nola (6–8)	**Jansen** (23)	27,486	59–40	W1
100	July 27	@ Phillies	2–7	Gibson (6–4)	**Morton** (5–5)	—	29,038	59–41	L1
101	July 29	Diamondbacks	5–2	**Wright** (13–4)	Bumgarner (6–10)	**Jansen** (24)	41,536	60–41	W1
102	July 30	Diamondbacks	6–2	**Anderson** (9–6)	Martin (0–1)	—	41,682	61–41	W2
103	July 31	Diamondbacks	1–0	**Jansen** (5–0)	Melancon (3–9)	—	39,005	62–41	W3

August: 18–10 (Home: 7–4; Away: 11–6)

#	Date	Opponent	Score	Win	Loss	Save	Attendance	Record	Streak
104	August 2	Phillies	13–1	**Strider** (6–3)	Nelson (3–2)	—	38,932	63–41	W4
105	August 3	Phillies	1–3	Wheeler (10–5)	**McHugh** (2–2)	Robertson (15)	30,380	63–42	L1
106	August 4	@ Mets	4–6	Carrasco (12–5)	**Wright** (13–5)	Díaz (24)	38,693	63–43	L2
107	August 5	@ Mets	9–6	**Minter** (5–3)	Walker (9–3)	—	40,305	64–43	W1
108	August 6	@ Mets	5–8	Peterson (6–2)	**Odorizzi** (4–4)	Díaz (25)	37,790	64–44	L1
109	August 6	@ Mets	2–6	Scherzer (8–2)	**Fried** (10–4)	—	37,452	64–45	L2
110	August 7	@ Mets	2–5	deGrom (1–0)	**Strider** (6–4)	Díaz (26)	37,717	64–46	L3
111	August 9	@ Red Sox	9–7 (11)	**Lee** (3–0)	Ort (0–1)	**Matzek** (1)	34,972	65–46	W1
112	August 10	@ Red Sox	8–4	**Wright** (14–5)	Pivetta (8–9)	—	35,406	66–46	W2
113	August 12	@ Marlins	4–3	**Matzek** (2–2)	Hernández (2–6)	**Jansen** (25)	10,459	67–46	W3
114	August 13	@ Marlins	5–2	**Muller** (1–1)	Luzardo (3–5)	**Jansen** (26)	7,308	68–46	W4
115	August 13	@ Marlins	6–2	**Anderson** (10–6)	Nance (0–1)	**Iglesias** (17)	11,910	69–46	W5
116	August 14	@ Marlins	3–1	**Matzek** (3–2)	Scott (4–5)	**Jansen** (27)	10,902	70–46	W6
117	August 15	Mets	13–1	**Strider** (7–4)	Carrasco (13–5)	—	38,380	71–46	W7
118	August 16	Mets	5–0	**Morton** (6–5)	Alvarez (0–1)	—	37,449	72–46	W8
119	August 17	Mets	7–9	Scherzer (9–2)	**Odorizzi** (4–5)	—	34,308	72–47	L1
120	August 18	Mets	3–2	**Fried** (11–4)	deGrom (2–1)	**Jansen** (28)	39,378	73–47	W1
121	August 19	Astros	6–2	**Wright** (15–5)	McCullers Jr. (1–1)	—	42,837	74–47	W2
122	August 20	Astros	5–4 (11)	**Stephens** (2–2)	Stanek (1–1)	—	42,893	75–47	W3
123	August 21	Astros	4–5	Urquidy (12–4)	**Lee** (3–1)	Pressly (25)	42,531	75–48	L1
124	August 22	@ Pirates	2–1	**Odorizzi** (5–5)	Contreras (3–4)	**Jansen** (29)	11,231	76–48	W1
125	August 23	@ Pirates	6–1	**Fried** (12–4)	Brubaker (3–11)	—	13,367	77–48	W2
126	August 24	@ Pirates	14–2	**Wright** (16–5)	Keller (4–10)	—	12,060	78–48	W3
127	August 26	@ Cardinals	11–4	**Strider** (8–4)	Quintana (4–6)	—	46,027	79–48	W4
128	August 27	@ Cardinals	5–6	Helsley (8–1)	**Jansen** (5–1)	—	46,119	79–49	L1
129	August 28	@ Cardinals	3–6	Helsley (9–1)	**Minter** (5–4)	Gallegos (13)	42,897	79–50	L2
130	August 30	Rockies	2–3	Ureña (3–5)	**Fried** (12–5)	Bard (28)	34,237	79–51	L3
131	August 31	Rockies	3–2	**Wright** (17–5)	Feltner (2–6)	**Jansen** (30)	29,554	80–51	W1

September: 18–8 (Home: 10–1; Away: 8–7)

#	Date	Opponent	Score	Win	Loss	Save	Attendance	Record	Streak
132	September 1	Rockies	3–0	**Strider** (9–4)	Kuhl (6–8)	**Jansen** (31)	31,203	81–51	W2
133	September 2	Marlins	8–1	**Morton** (7–5)	Alcántara (12–7)	—	42,161	82–51	W3
134	September 3	Marlins	2–1	**Matzek** (4–2)	Okert (5–2)	—	42,405	83–51	W4
135	September 4	Marlins	7–1	**Fried** (13–5)	López (8–9)	—	42,360	84–51	W5
136	September 6	@ Athletics	10–9	**Chavez** (3–1)	Payamps (3–4)	**Jansen** (32)	6,062	85–51	W6
137	September 7	@ Athletics	7–3	**Strider** (10–4)	Waldichuk (0–1)	—	5,332	86–51	W7
138	September 9	@ Mariners	6–4	**Morton** (8–5)	Ray (12–9)	**Jansen** (33)	42,114	87–51	W8
139	September 10	@ Mariners	1–3	Kirby (7–3)	**Fried** (13–6)	Sewald (19)	44,965	87–52	L1
140	September 11	@ Mariners	7–8	Sewald (4–4)	**Jansen** (5–2)	—	45,245	87–53	L2
141	September 12	@ Giants	2–3	Cobb (6–6)	**Strider** (10–5)	Alexander (1)	23,790	87–54	L3
142	September 13	@ Giants	5–1	**Wright** (18–5)	Junis (4–6)	—	24,872	88–54	W1
143	September 14	@ Giants	1–4	Rodón (13–8)	**Morton** (8–6)	Doval (23)	25,093	88–55	L1
144	September 16	Phillies	7–2	**Chavez** (4–1)	Domínguez (6–5)	—	42,578	89–55	W1
145	September 17	Phillies	4–3	**Lee** (4–1)	Nola (9–12)	**Jansen** (34)	42,542	90–55	W2
146	September 18	Phillies	5–2	**Strider** (11–5)	Brogdon (2–1)	—	42,015	91–55	W3
147	September 19	Nationals	5–2	**Wright** (19–5)	Abbott (0–3)	**Jansen** (35)	33,443	92–55	W4
148	September 20	Nationals	3–2	**Morton** (9–6)	Ramírez (4–2)	**Jansen** (36)	40,224	93–55	W5
149	September 21	Nationals	2–3	Machado (2–0)	**Chavez** (4–2)	Finnegan (11)	37,240	93–56	L1
150	September 22	@ Phillies	0–1	Suárez (10–5)	**Fried** (13–7)	Alvarado (2)	21,276	93–57	L2
151	September 23	@ Phillies	1–9	Nola (10–12)	**Odorizzi** (5–6)	—	28,013	93–58	L3
152	September 24	@ Phillies	6–3	**Wright** (20–5)	Falter (5–4)	**Jansen** (37)	36,692	94–58	W1
153	September 25	@ Phillies	8–7 (11)	**Stephens** (3–2)	Bellatti (4–4)	—	32,090	95–58	W2
154	September 26	@ Nationals	8–0	**Elder** (2–3)	Abbott (0–4)	—	24,684	96–58	W3
155	September 27	@ Nationals	8–2	**McHugh** (3–2)	Espino (0–8)	—	23,281	97–58	W4
156	September 28	@ Nationals	2–3 (10)	Finnegan (6–4)	**Stephens** (3–3)	—	24,876	97–59	L1
157	September 30	Mets	5–2	**Fried** (14–7)	deGrom (5–4)	**Jansen** (38)	42,402	98–59	W1

October: 3–2 (Home: 2–0; Away: 1–2)

#	Date	Opponent	Score	Win	Loss	Save	Attendance	Record	Streak
158	October 1	Mets	4–2	**Wright** (21–5)	Scherzer (11–5)	**Jansen** (39)	42,561	99–59	W2
159	October 2	Mets	5–3	**Lee** (5–1)	Bassitt (15–9)	**Jansen** (40)	42,713	100–59	W3
160	October 3	@ Marlins	0–4	Luzardo (4–7)	**Elder** (2–4)	—	10,767	100–60	L1
161	October 4	@ Marlins	2–1	**Odorizzi** (6–6)	Garrett (3–7)	**Jansen** (41)	14,138	101–60	W1
162	October 5	@ Marlins	9–12	Nardi (1–1)	**Chavez** (4–3)	Floro (10)	12,195	101–61	L1

Legend: = Win = Loss = Postponement
Bold = Braves team member

== Postseason ==
=== Game log ===
2022 Postseason Game Log: 1–3 (Home: 1–1; Away: 0–2)
NLDS: 1–3 (Home: 1–1; Away: 0–2)

#	Date	Opponent	Score	Win	Loss	Save	Attendance	Series
1	October 11	Phillies	6–7	Domínguez (1–0)	Fried (0–1)	—	42,641	0–1
1	October 12	Phillies	3–0	Wright (1–0)	Wheeler (0–1)	Jansen (1)	42,735	1–1
3	October 14	@ Phillies	1–9	Nola (2–0)	Strider (0–1)	—	45,538	1–2
4	October 15	@ Phillies	3–8	Hand (1–0)	Morton (0–1)	—	45,660	1–3

=== Postseason rosters ===
Playoff rosters
National League Division Series

- Pitchers: 12 Jake Odorizzi 26 Raisel Iglesias 30 Kyle Wright 32 Collin McHugh 33 A. J. Minter 50 Charlie Morton 52 Dylan Lee 53 Jackson Stephens 54 Max Fried 60 Jesse Chavez 65 Spencer Strider 74 Kenley Jansen
- Catchers: 16 Travis d'Arnaud 24 William Contreras
- Infielders: 7 Dansby Swanson 11 Orlando Arcia 17 Ehire Adrianza 18 Vaughn Grissom 27 Austin Riley 28 Matt Olson
- Outfielders: 8 Eddie Rosario 13 Ronald Acuña Jr. 15 Robbie Grossman 20 Marcell Ozuna 23 Michael Harris II 38 Guillermo Heredia

== Statistics ==
Team leader in each category is in bold.

- Indicates league leader.

=== Batting ===
(Final stats)
Players in bold are on the active roster.
Note: G = Games played; AB = At bats; R = Runs; H = Hits; 2B = Doubles; 3B = Triples; HR = Home runs; RBI = Runs batted in; SB = Stolen bases; BB = Walks; K = Strikeouts; Avg. = Batting average; OBP = On-base Percentage; SLG = Slugging percentage; TB = Total bases

Player	G	AB	R	H	2B	3B	HR	RBI	SB	BB	K	AVG	OBP	SLG	TB
**Ronald Acuña Jr.**	119	467	71	124	24	0	15	50	**29**	53	126	.266	**.351**	.413	193
Ehire Adrianza	6	13	3	2	1	0	0	0	0	3	3	.154	.313	.231	3
Ozzie Albies	64	247	36	61	16	0	8	35	3	16	47	.247	.294	.409	101
**Orlando Arcia**	67	209	25	51	9	0	9	30	0	21	51	.244	.316	.416	87
Rylan Bannon	1	0	0	0	0	0	0	0	0	0	0	0	—	—	—
Robinson Canó	9	26	1	4	1	0	0	0	0	0	0	.154	.185	.192	5
**William Contreras**	97	334	51	93	14	1	20	45	2	39	44	.278	.354	.506	169
**Travis d'Arnaud**	107	396	61	106	25	1	18	60	0	19	90	.268	.319	.472	187
Travis Demeritte	26	89	9	19	2	0	3	6	0	6	32	.213	.260	.337	30
Alex Dickerson	13	33	3	4	0	0	1	2	0	3	9	.121	.194	.212	7
**Adam Duvall**	86	315	39	61	16	1	12	36	0	21	101	.213	.276	.401	115
Mike Ford	5	7	0	0	0	0	0	0	0	1	2	.000	.125	.000	0
Phil Gosselin	12	23	4	6	0	0	0	0	0	1	6	.261	.292	.261	6
**Vaughn Grissom**	41	141	24	41	6	0	5	18	5	11	34	.291	.353	.440	62
**Robbie Grossman**	46	138	16	30	6	0	5	22	3	18	39	.217	.306	.370	51
**Michael Harris II**	114	414	75	123	27	**3**	19	64	20	21	107	.297	.339	.514	213
**Guillermo Heredia**	74	76	12	12	3	1	3	8	0	6	32	.158	.220	.342	26
**Matt Olson**	**162***	616	86	148	**44**	0	34	**103**	0	**75**	170	.240	.325	.477	294
**Marcell Ozuna**	124	470	56	106	19	0	23	56	2	31	122	.226	.274	.413	194
Manny Piña	5	14	1	2	0	0	0	2	0	1	1	.143	.235	.143	2
**Austin Riley**	159	615	90	168	39	2	**38**	93	2	57	168	.273	.349	**.528**	**325***
**Eddie Rosario**	80	250	27	53	12	1	5	24	3	17	68	.212	.259	.328	82
**Dansby Swanson**	**162***	**640**	**99**	**177**	32	1	25	96	18	49	**182**	**.277**	.329	.447	286
Chadwick Tromp	1	4	0	3	2	0	0	3	0	0	0	.750	.750	1.250	5
**TEAM TOTALS**	162	5509	789	1394	298	11	243	753	87	470	1498	.253	.317	.443	2443

=== Pitching ===
(Final stats)
Players in bold are on the active roster.
Note: W = Wins; L = Losses; ERA = Earned run average; WHIP = Walks plus hits per inning pitched; G = Games pitched; GS = Games started; SV = Saves; IP = Innings pitched; H = Hits allowed; R = Runs allowed; ER = Earned runs allowed; BB = Walks allowed; K = Strikeouts

Player	W	L	ERA	WHIP	G	GS	SV	IP	H	R	ER	BB	K
**Ian Anderson**	10	6	5.00	1.513	22	22	0	111.2	115	63	62	54	97
Orlando Arcia	0	0	0.00	1.000	1	0	0	1.0	0	0	0	1	0
Silvino Bracho	0	0	6.23	0.923	3	0	0	4.1	3	3	3	1	4
**Jesse Chavez**	3	3	2.72	1.189	46	1	0	53.0	49	18	16	14	61
Jesús Cruz	0	0	6.23	1.385	7	0	0	8.2	8	6	6	4	6
Tucker Davidson	1	2	6.46	1.826	4	3	0	15.1	15	11	11	13	10
**Bryce Elder**	2	4	3.17	1.241	10	9	0	54.0	44	19	19	23	47
Mike Ford	0	0	18.00	2.000	1	0	0	1.0	1	2	2	1	0
**Max Fried**	14	**7**	**2.48**	**1.014**	30	30	0	**185.1**	**156**	55	51	32	170
**Raisel Iglesias**	0	0	0.34	0.835	28	0	1	26.1	17	2	1	5	30
Jay Jackson	0	0	0.00	0.750	2	0	0	1.1	1	0	0	0	1
**Kenley Jansen**	5	2	3.38	1.047	65	0	**41**	64.0	45	25	24	22	85
**Dylan Lee**	5	1	2.13	0.987	46	0	0	50.2	40	16	12	10	59
**Tyler Matzek**	4	2	3.50	1.260	42	0	0	43.2	26	21	17	29	36
**Collin McHugh**	3	2	2.60	0.938	58	0	0	69.1	51	20	20	14	75
**A. J. Minter**	5	4	2.06	0.914	**75**	0	5	70.0	49	21	16	15	94
**Charlie Morton**	9	6	4.34	1.233	31	**31**	0	172.0	149	**85**	**83**	**63**	**205**
Kyle Muller	1	1	8.03	1.703	3	3	0	12.1	13	11	11	8	12
Sean Newcomb	0	0	7.20	2.200	3	0	0	5.0	7	4	4	4	4
Darren O'Day	2	2	4.15	1.338	28	0	0	21.2	19	12	10	10	26
**Jake Odorizzi**	2	3	5.24	1.554	10	10	0	46.1	54	29	27	18	40
**Will Smith**	0	1	4.38	1.514	41	0	5	37.0	35	25	18	21	41
**Jackson Stephens**	3	3	3.69	1.342	39	0	2	53.2	49	32	22	23	47
**Spencer Strider**	11	5	2.67	0.995	31	20	0	131.2	86	42	39	45	202
Freddy Tarnok	0	0	0.00	1.500	1	0	0	0.2	1	0	0	0	1
Tyler Thornburg	0	0	3.86	1.821	9	0	0	9.1	12	6	4	5	10
William Woods	0	0	0.00	1.500	2	0	0	2.0	2	0	0	1	2
**Kyle Wright**	**21***	5	3.19	1.159	30	30	0	180.1	**156**	55	51	32	170
**Kirby Yates**	0	0	5.14	1.571	9	0	0	7.0	6	4	4	5	6
Huascar Ynoa	0	2	13.50	2.550	2	2	0	6.2	11	10	10	6	8
Danny Young	0	0	0.00	1.500	1	0	0	2.2	4	0	0	0	1
**TEAM TOTALS**	101	61	3.46	1.191	162	162	55	1448.0	1224	609	556	500	1554

== Farm system ==
Level	Team	League	Manager
AAA	Gwinnett Stripers	International League	Matt Tuiasosopo
AA	Mississippi Braves	Southern League	Bruce Crabbe
A-Advanced	Rome Braves	South Atlantic League	Kanekoa Texeira
A	Augusta GreenJackets	Carolina League	Nestor Perez
Rookie	FCL Braves	Florida Complex League	Cody Gabella
Rookie	DSL Braves	Dominican Summer League	
