= Maddux (statistic) =

Baseball statistic

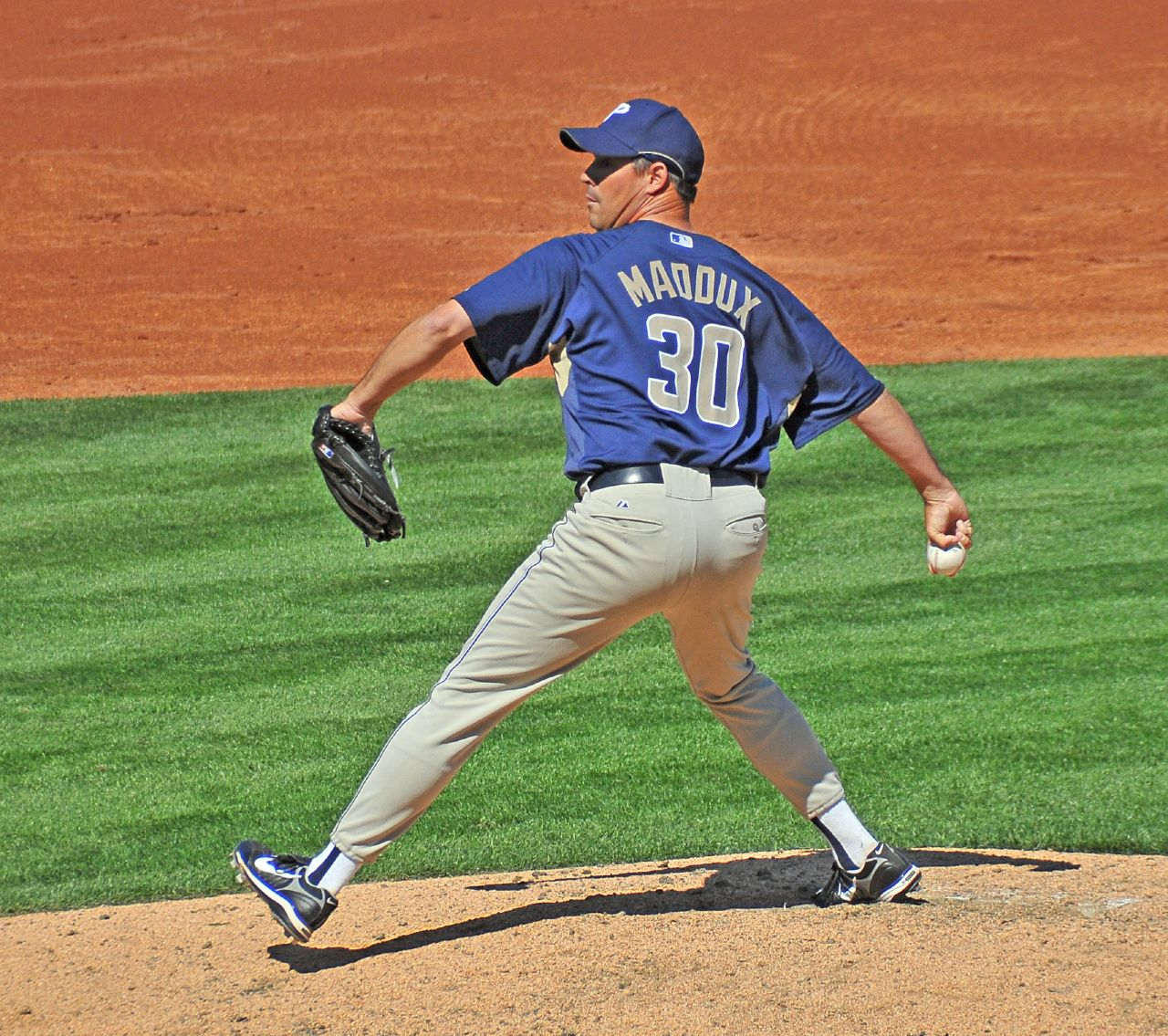
Greg Maddux, the statistic's namesake, pitched 13 such games over a 22-season career in Major League Baseball.

A Maddux, in baseball statistics, is when a pitcher throws a shutout of nine or more innings with fewer than 100 pitches. Writer Jason Lukehart invented the statistic in 2012 and named it after his favorite baseball player, Greg Maddux.

Maddux has the most career Madduxes with 13 since 1988, the first year of complete pitch count data. Zane Smith has the second-most career Madduxes with seven, and shares the single-season record with Maddux, at three each. Max Fried is the leader among active players, with three in his career. The 1988 season had the most Madduxes with 25, while the COVID-pandemic-shortened 2020 season had none. Roy Halladay is the only player to have thrown an extra-inning Maddux, throwing 99 pitches in 10 innings on September 6, 2003. The most recent Maddux, as of June 2026, is Jacob Misiorowski of the Milwaukee Brewers, where he also had the most strikeouts of any pitcher during a Maddux with 15.

== List of Madduxes by team ==
=== Key ===
*	No-hitter
^	Perfect game

Madduxes by team since 1988
Team	Number	Most recent date	Most recent pitcher	Pitch count	Date of fewest pitches in Maddux	Fewest-pitches pitcher	Pitch count
Arizona Diamondbacks	6	May 29, 2014	Josh Collmenter	94	July 18, 2003	Miguel Batista	93
Arizona Diamondbacks	6	May 29, 2014	Josh Collmenter	94	April 10, 2001	Curt Schilling	93
Atlanta Braves	25	April 23, 2024	Max Fried	92	August 20, 1995	Greg Maddux	88
Baltimore Orioles	6	June 28, 2001	Sidney Ponson	92	July 21, 1990	Ben McDonald	85
Boston Red Sox	11	April 17, 2024	Tanner Houck	94	June 29, 2012	Aaron Cook	81
Chicago Cubs	13	May 3, 2019	Kyle Hendricks	81	May 24, 2001	Jon Lieber	78
Chicago White Sox	8	September 21, 2015	Jeff Samardzija	88	May 1, 1989	Jerry Reuss	87
Cincinnati Reds	11	September 21, 2011	Bronson Arroyo	91	July 15, 2002	Chris Reitsma	89
Cleveland Guardians	9	August 4, 2018	Corey Kluber	98	July 30, 2014	Corey Kluber	85
Colorado Rockies	4	June 29, 2021	Germán Márquez	92	July 1, 2008	Aaron Cook	79
Detroit Tigers	10	May 25, 2025	Tarik Skubal	94	June 2, 2010	Armando Galarraga	88
Houston Astros	9	August 1, 2023	Framber Valdez	93	July 18, 1990	Mike Scott	86
Kansas City Royals	6	August 13, 2014	Jason Vargas	97	September 2, 1996	Tim Belcher	90
Los Angeles Angels	14	August 19, 2022	Patrick Sandoval	97	April 16, 1989	Bert Blyleven	90
Los Angeles Dodgers	14	May 7, 2019	Hyun-Jin Ryu	93	June 25, 2002	Odalis Pérez	87
Miami Marlins	9	April 1, 2026	Sandy Alcántara	93	June 3, 2014	Henderson Álvarez	88
Milwaukee Brewers	13	June 12, 2026	Jacob Misiorowski	95	September 17, 1991	Chris Bosio	82
Minnesota Twins	16	May 12, 2026	Bailey Ober	89	April 17, 1992	Bill Krueger	85
New York Mets	8	July 27, 2019	Steven Matz	99	August 28, 1989	Frank Viola	85
New York Yankees	11	June 28, 2023	Domingo Germán	99	June 30, 1992	Scott Sanderson	86
Oakland Athletics	10	July 3, 2024	Joey Estes	92	July 14, 2005	Rich Harden	80
Philadelphia Phillies	15	September 25, 2021	Ranger Suárez	97	September 2, 1997	Mike Grace	84
Pittsburgh Pirates	16	July 23, 2018	Trevor Williams	84	September 30, 1990	Doug Drabek	80
San Diego Padres	9	September 15, 2014	Andrew Cashner	92	May 14, 2006	Clay Hensley	91
Seattle Mariners	12	August 18, 2019	Yusei Kikuchi	96	May 17, 2000	John Halama	87
San Francisco Giants	13	August 3, 2014	Madison Bumgarner	94	September 17, 1993	Bill Swift	82
St. Louis Cardinals	15	June 27, 2025	Sonny Gray	89	August 17, 1990	Bob Tewksbury	79
Tampa Bay Rays	6	August 20, 2015	Chris Archer	98	May 9, 2008	James Shields	92
Texas Rangers	9	April 1, 2025	Nathan Eovaldi	99	June 20, 1990	Kevin Brown	79
Toronto Blue Jays	17	June 3, 2015	Mark Buehrle	93	October 5, 2001	Roy Halladay	83
Washington Nationals	8	August 11, 2013	Stephen Strasburg	99	August 15, 2006	Pedro Astacio	89
