= Michael Harris II =

American baseball player (born 2001)

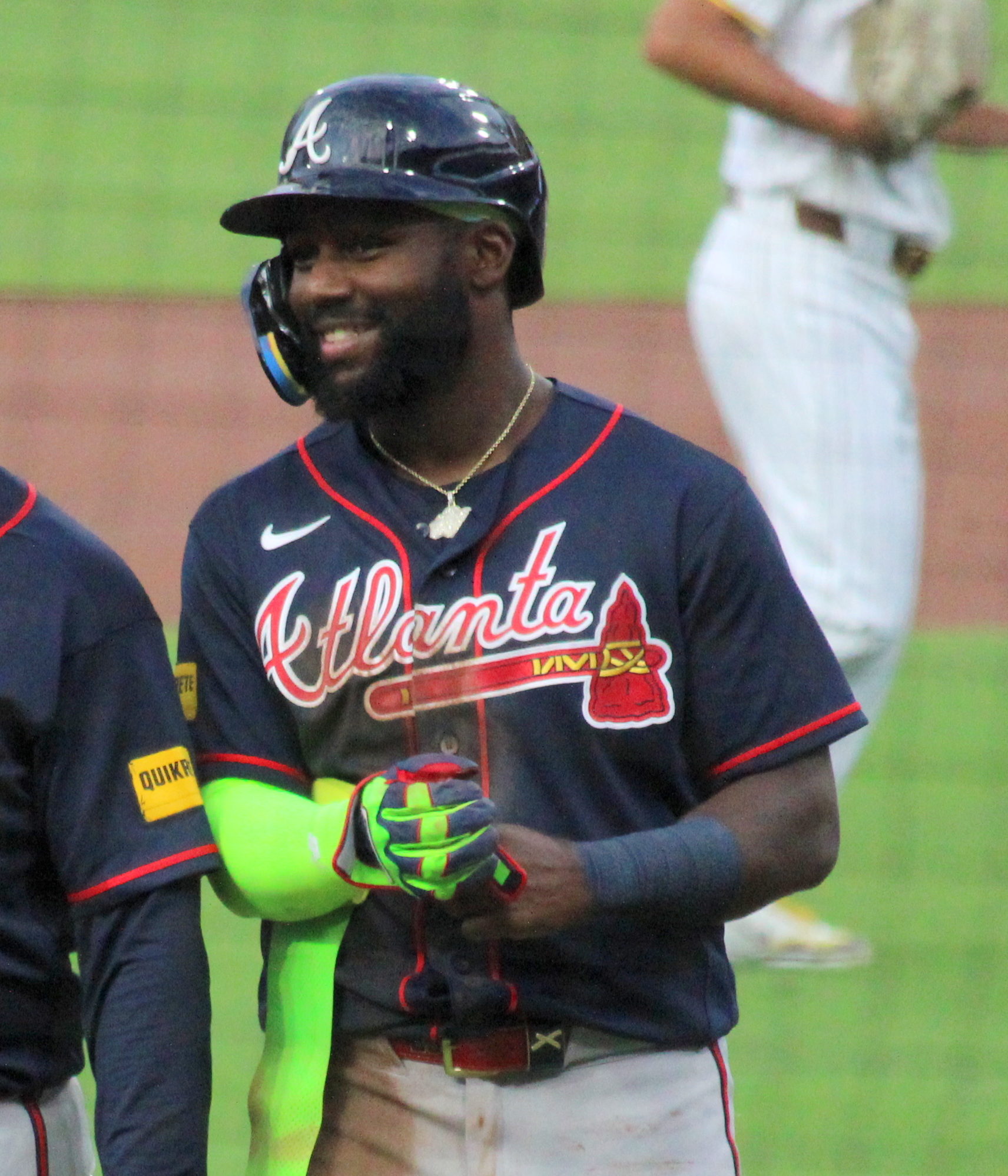
- Harris with the Braves in 2026

Atlanta Braves – No. 23
- Center fielder
- Born: March 7, 2001 (age 25); Decatur, Georgia, U.S.
- Bats: Left Throws: Left

MLB debut
- May 28, 2022, for the Atlanta Braves

MLB statistics (through 2026 season)
- Batting average: .278
- Home runs: 99
- Runs batted in: 342
- Stats at Baseball Reference

Teams
- Atlanta Braves (2022–present)

Career highlights and awards
- NL Rookie of the Year (2022)

Michael Machion Harris II (born March 7, 2001) is an American professional baseball center fielder for the Atlanta Braves of Major League Baseball (MLB). He was selected by the Braves in the third round of the 2019 MLB draft. He made his MLB debut with them in 2022, and won the National League Rookie of the Year Award.

== Early life and amateur career ==
Michael Harris II was born to Michael Harris Sr. and LaTaucha Harris. His mother worked for the Fulton County School System as a special education teacher and his father played college baseball at Alcorn State. He has a sister, Mikaylah. Harris grew up near Turner Field and wanted to play for the Atlanta Braves since he was a young child. Harris spent his childhood in DeKalb and Henry counties before attending Stockbridge High School in Stockbridge, Georgia. As a high schooler, he was coached by family friend Marquis Grissom in summer leagues and received further training from Grissom during the offseasons.

He was drafted by the Atlanta Braves in the third round of the 2019 Major League Baseball draft. He signed with the Braves for a bonus of $548,000, forgoing his commitment to play college baseball at Texas Tech University, as well as a desire to attend veterinary school. Prior to considering Texas Tech, Harris had been recruited by the Louisiana State Tigers baseball team solely as a pitcher.

== Professional career ==
=== Minor leagues ===
Harris started his professional career that year with the Gulf Coast Braves before being promoted to the Rome Braves. Over 53 games between the two teams, he batted .277/.344/.393 with two home runs and 27 runs batted in.

Due to the cancellation of the 2020 Minor League Baseball season due to COVID-19, he did not play for a team. In 2021, the Braves invited him to their spring training. He spent the 2021 season with the Rome Braves, slashing .294/.362/.436 with seven home runs, 64 runs batted in, and 27 stolen bases. In June, he was selected to play in the All-Star Futures Game.

Harris was again invited to spring training by the Braves in 2022. He was assigned to the Mississippi Braves to begin the 2022 season, slashing .305/.372/.506 with five home runs, 33 runs batted in, and 11 stolen bases in 43 games before being called up to the major leagues. During the 2022 season, Harris was ranked the 63rd-best prospect in all of Minor League Baseball, and the Braves' best prospect.

=== Atlanta Braves ===
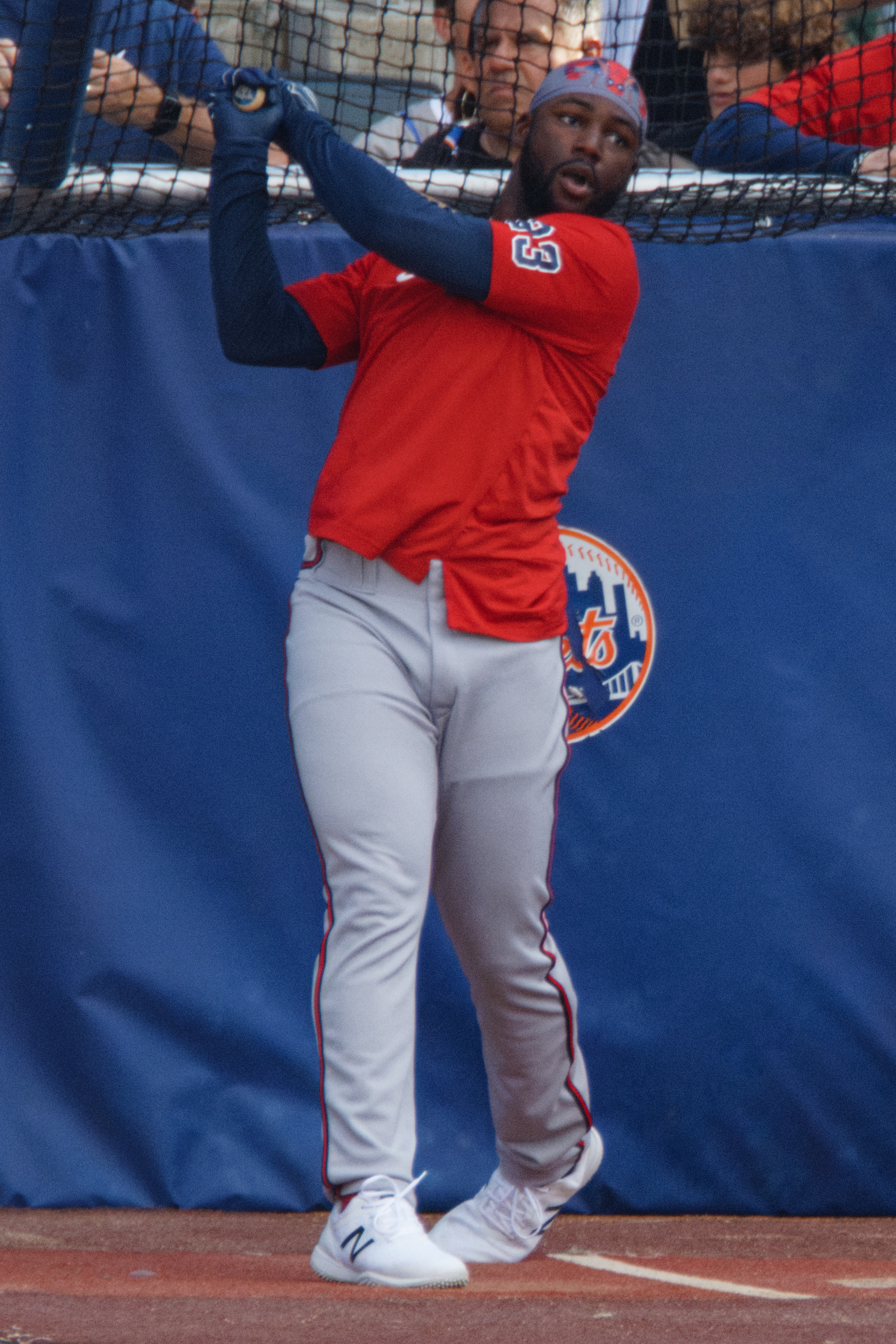
Harris II taking batting practice for the Braves in 2022

On May 28, 2022, Harris was selected to the major league roster, and he made his debut later that day against the Miami Marlins. Harris struck out in his first major league at-bat, and later on in the same game, recorded his first hit, a single, and scored his first run. While facing the Arizona Diamondbacks on May 31, Harris drove in his first career run. Harris hit his first career home run against the Washington Nationals on June 13. During the month of June, Harris had a .347/.371/.574 slash line. Of his 35 hits, 13 were extra base hits. He also drove in 16 runs, stole four bases, and won the Rookie of the Month Award. On August 17, the Braves and Harris agreed to an eight-year contract extension worth at least $72 million. As the season continued, Harris, teammate Spencer Strider, and the Braves' later call-up Vaughn Grissom were considered possible National League Rookie of the Year candidates. Harris was again named Rookie of the Month for August, posting a .337/.400/.590 slash line. Sixteen of his rookie-leading 32 hits during the month were for extra bases. In September, Harris was recognized as Rookie of the Month for the third time, having batted .324 with six home runs and 19 RBI.

On November 14, Harris was named the 2022 National League Rookie of the Year, finishing ahead of teammate Spencer Strider. Harris and Strider were the second pair of Braves to finish first and second for the award, following Craig Kimbrel and Freddie Freeman in 2011. Harris dedicated the award to Marquis Grissom, his youth baseball tutor, with whom he had continued working during the offseasons.

Harris played in 138 games for the Braves during the 2023 campaign, slashing .293/.331/.477 with 18 home runs, 57 RBI, and 20 stolen bases.

Harris began the 2024 campaign with Atlanta, playing in 67 games and hitting .250/.295/.358 with five home runs, 20 RBI, and eight stolen bases. He was placed on the injured list with a Grade 2 left hamstring strain on June 15. Harris was transferred to the 60–day injured list on July 24. He was activated on August 14, and hit his first career grand slam off of San Francisco Giants pitcher Robbie Ray, which landed in McCovey Cove, making him the first visiting player to hit the water with a grand slam.

During the Braves' July 1, 2026 home game against the St. Louis Cardinals, Harris was "adopted" as a fan-favorite of England soccer fans. The supporters had attended the game following their World Cup victory over the DR Congo at Atlanta's Mercedes-Benz Stadium earlier that day, and they spent the game chanting Harris' name and working it into songs. Harris stated that he was initially "confused", but came to appreciate the support, posting messages on social media and declaring his support for England for the rest of the tournament.

== Personal life ==
Harris married Esther in 2024. The couple began dating in 2021.
