= Ehire Adrianza =

Venezuelan baseball player (born 1989)

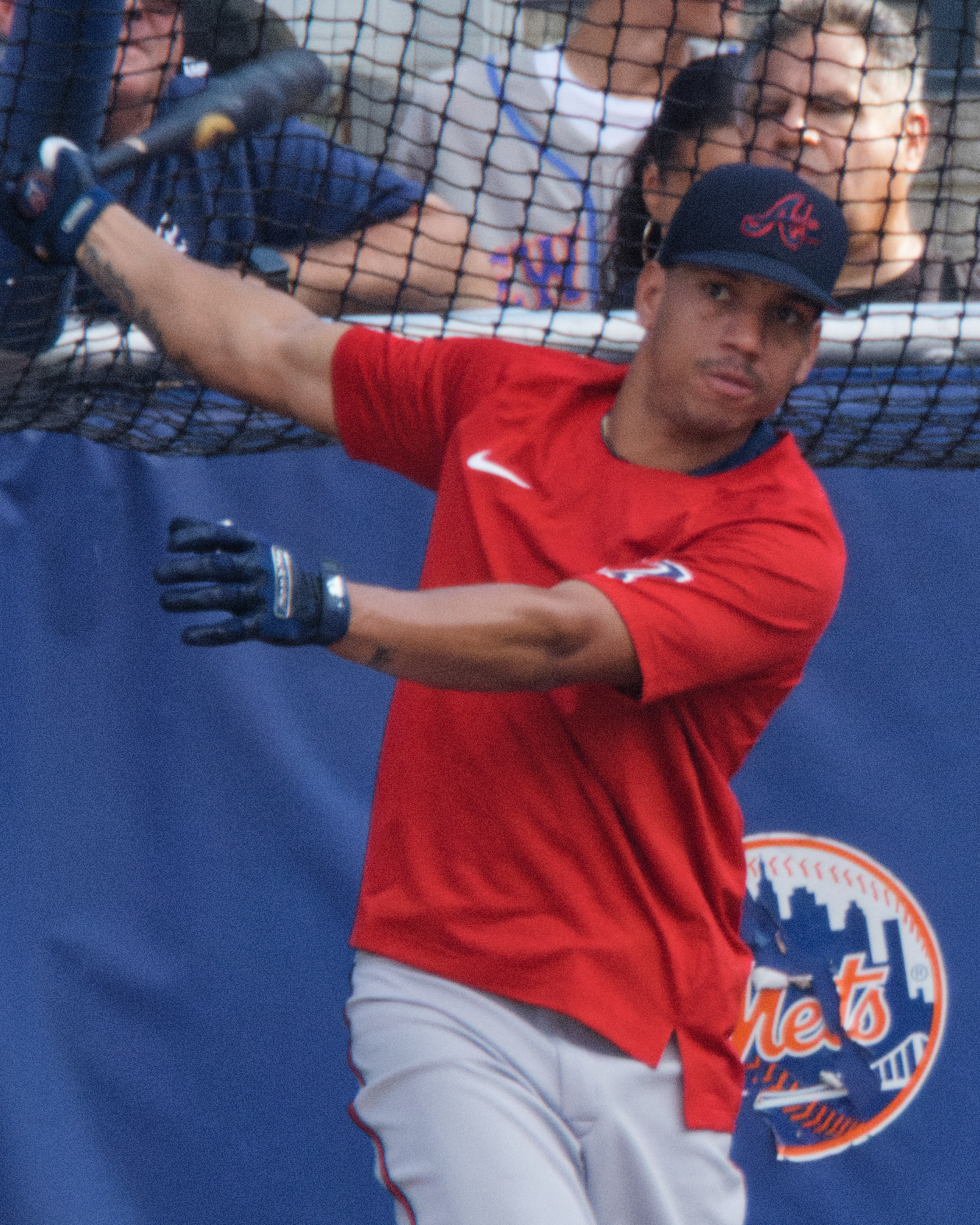
- Adrianza with the Atlanta Braves in 2022
- Infielder
- Born: August 21, 1989 (age 36); Guarenas, Miranda, Venezuela
- Batted: Switch Threw: Right

MLB debut
- September 8, 2013, for the San Francisco Giants

Last MLB appearance
- May 8, 2024, for the Los Angeles Angels

MLB statistics
- Batting average: .237
- Home runs: 22
- Runs batted in: 151
- Stats at Baseball Reference

Teams
- San Francisco Giants (2013–2016); Minnesota Twins (2017–2020); Atlanta Braves (2021); Washington Nationals (2022); Atlanta Braves (2022–2023); Los Angeles Angels (2024)

Career highlights and awards
- World Series champion (2021)

Ehire Enrique Adrianza Palma (Spanish pronunciation: [ˈejɾe aðˈɾjansa]; born August 21, 1989) is a Venezuelan-American former professional baseball infielder. He played in Major League Baseball (MLB) for the San Francisco Giants, Minnesota Twins, Washington Nationals, Atlanta Braves, and Los Angeles Angels.

== Early life ==
Ehire Enrique Adrianza Palma was born on August 21, 1989, in Miranda, Venezuela.

== Playing career ==
=== San Francisco Giants (2006-2016) ===
==== Minor leagues ====
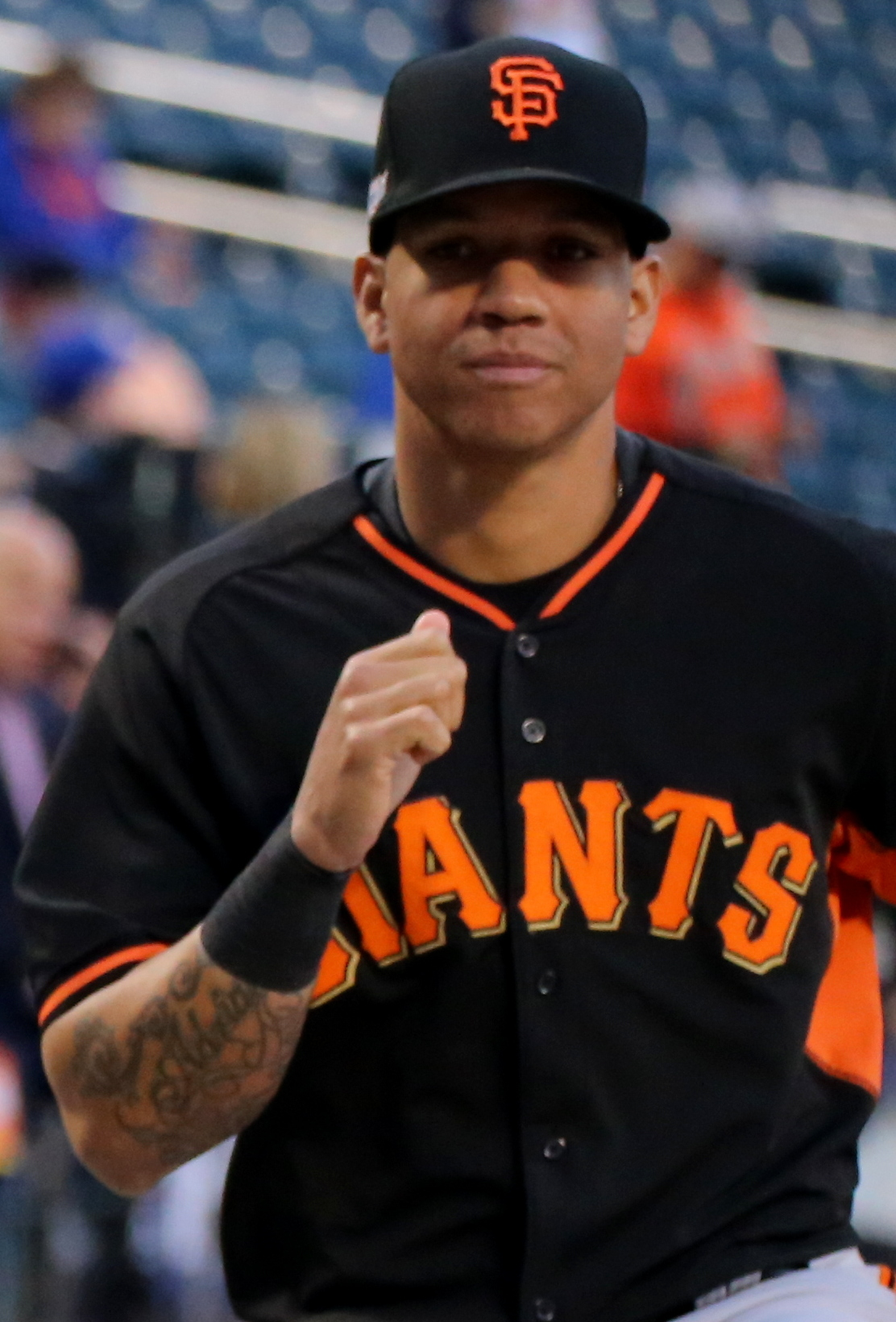
Adrianza with the Giants in 2016

Adrianza began his professional career in 2006, playing for the Dominican Summer League Giants and hitting .156 in 122 at-bats. In 2007, he played again for the DSL Giants, improving his batting average to .241 in 249 at-bats, stealing 23 bases in 29 attempts.

Adrianza played in the United States for the first time in 2008, splitting the season between three teams – the rookie–level Arizona League Giants (15 games), Low–A Salem-Keizer Volcanoes (one game) and the Triple–A Fresno Grizzlies (two games). Overall, he hit a combined .288 in 66 at-bats. After hitting .258 in 388 at-bats for the Single–A Augusta Greenjackets in 2009, Adrianza helped the High–A San Jose Giants win the California League Championship in 2010. He hit .256 in 445 at-bats, stealing 33 bases in 48 attempts. He would remain in San Jose during the bulk of the 2011 season and slash .300 with 3 home runs and 27 RBI. In 2012, Adrianza played in 127 games for the Double–A Richmond Flying Squirrels, hitting .220/.289/.310 with 3 home runs, 32 RBI, and 16 stolen bases. He began the 2013 season with Richmond, and also spent time with Fresno.

==== Major leagues ====
Adrianza made his Major League debut on September 8, 2013, against the Arizona Diamondbacks, and in doing so became the 300th Venezuelan to play in Major League Baseball. He entered the game as a pinch runner in the 11th inning and scored the winning run in a 3–2 victory. Adrianza hit his first career home run on September 22, 2013, against the New York Yankees. He broke up a no-hit bid by Andy Pettitte in his final start at Yankee Stadium. He played in 9 games and went 4–for–18 (.222). In 2014, Adrianza played in 53 games for San Francisco, batting .237/.279/.299 with no home runs and five RBI.

On April 5, 2015, Adrianza was designated for assignment by San Francisco after failing to make the Opening Day roster. He cleared waivers and was sent outright to the Triple–A Sacramento River Cats on April 11. On June 30, the Giants selected Adrianza's contract and added him to the active roster. On the year, he took the field primarily as a middle infielder, playing in 52 games and hitting .186/.303/.266 with no home runs, 11 RBI, and 3 stolen bases.

On April 9, 2016, Adrianza homered off Clayton Kershaw of the Los Angeles Dodgers for his second career home run. He was placed on the 60–day disabled list on April 22 after suffering a fractured foot. On August 2, Adrianza was activated from the injured list. In 40 big–league contests, he hit .254/.299/.381 with 2 home runs and 7 RBI. Adrianza and the Giants avoided salary arbitration following the season on December 3, agreeing to a one-year, $600,000 contract. On January 24, 2017, Adrianza was designated for assignment after the team signed Nick Hundley.

On January 31, 2017, Adrianza was claimed off waivers by the Milwaukee Brewers. Adrianza was subsequently designated for assignment on February 2.

=== Minnesota Twins (2017–2020) ===
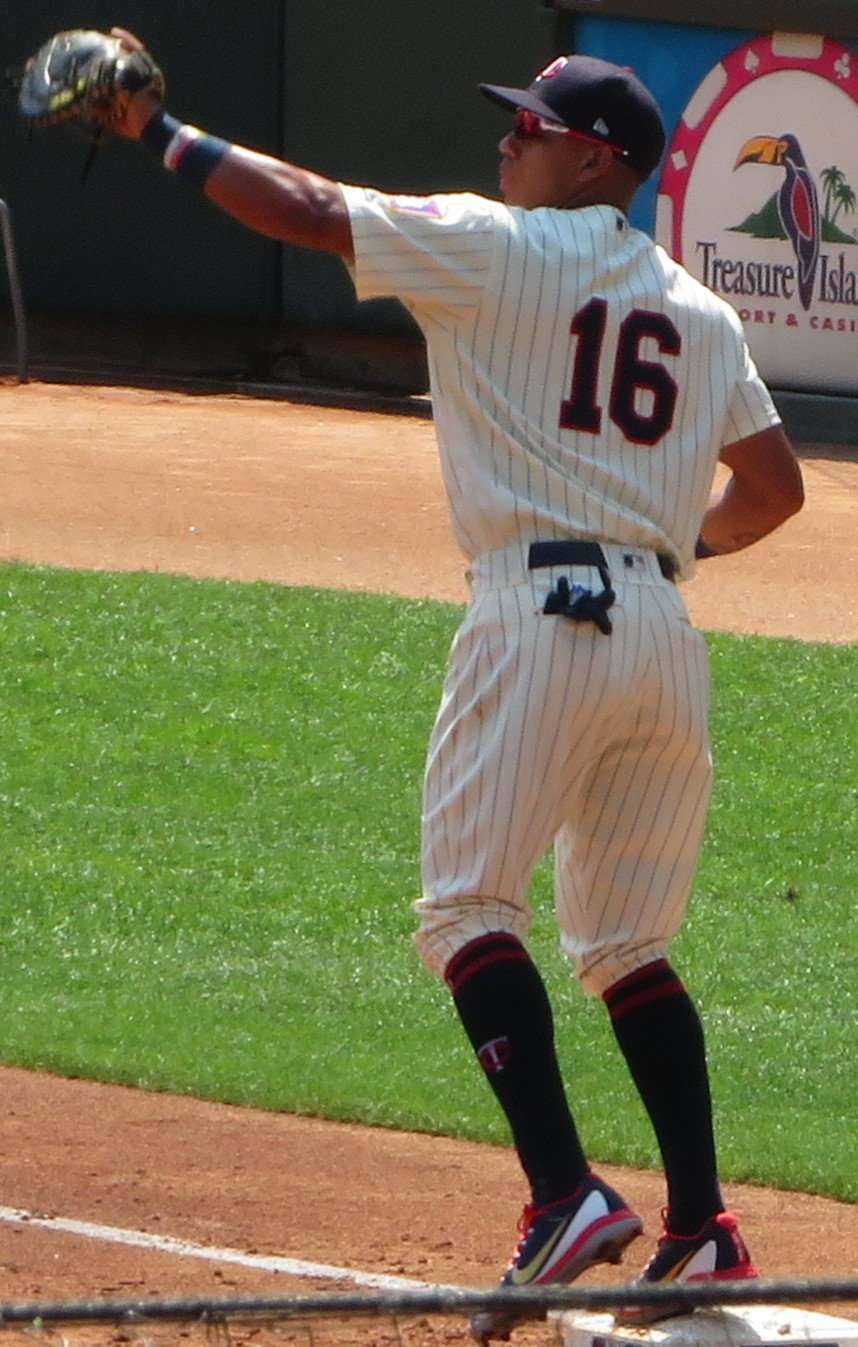
Adrianza playing for the Twins in 2018

On February 6, 2017, Adrianza was claimed by the Minnesota Twins. He played in 70 games for the Twins in 2017, compiling a batting average of .265 with 2 homers and 24 RBI. Before the 2018 season began, Adrianza agreed to a one-year contract worth $1 million. He established himself as a regular in the Twins’ infield over the course of the season. In 114 games, he hit .251 with 6 home runs and 39 RBIs. Adrianza set career bests by hitting 23 doubles and playing in 114 games. He returned to the Twins for the 2019 season, signing a contract worth $1.3 million. On September 29, 2019, Adrianza managed the Twins in place of Rocco Baldelli during a late-season contest after the Twins had won the American League Central division. The team lost 5–4 on a walk-off sac-fly to the Kansas City Royals. For the season, he hit .272/.349/.416 in 83 games. In December 2019, Adrianza agreed to a third consecutive one-year contract, which paid him $1.6 million for the 2020 season. In 2020, Adrianza hit .191/.287/.270 with 17 hits and no home runs in 89 at-bats over 44 games.

=== Atlanta Braves (2021) ===
On January 26, 2021, Adrianza signed a minor league contract with the Atlanta Braves organization. He also received an invitation to attend Major League spring training. On March 27, Adrianza was selected to the 40-man roster. In 2021, he batted .247/.327/.401 with 5 home runs and 28 RBIs. The Braves finished with an 88–73 record, clinching the NL East, and eventually won the 2021 World Series, giving the Braves their first title since 1995.

=== Washington Nationals (2022) ===
On March 14, 2022, Adrianza signed a one-year contract with the Washington Nationals. Adrianza was placed on the 60-day injured list to start the year on April 21, after suffering a quadriceps strain. He was activated on June 7.

=== Second stint with Atlanta Braves (2022–2023) ===
On August 1, 2022, Adrianza was traded to the Braves for minor league outfielder Trey Harris and appeared in 6 games, going 2-for-13 with 3 walks. He became a free agent at the end of the season. On December 16, 2022, Adrianza re-signed with the Braves on a minor league contract.

He was invited to spring training in 2023, where he competed for a bench spot. On March 20, after Vaughn Grissom and Braden Shewmake were optioned to the Triple-A Gwinnett Stripers, it was announced that Adrianza would begin the season as Atlanta's primary utility infielder. After playing in five games for Atlanta (and going hitless in 10 at-bats), Adrianza was placed on the injured list with right elbow inflammation on May 5. He was transferred to the 60-day injured list on May 19 after suffering a left shoulder strain while on rehab assignment with the High-A Rome Braves. On September 25, Adrianza was activated from the injured list and subsequently designated for assignment. He cleared waivers and was sent outright to Triple–A Gwinnett on October 1. However, Adrianza elected free agency in lieu of the assignment the following day.

=== Los Angeles Angels (2024) ===
On February 16, 2024, Adrianza signed a minor league contract with the Los Angeles Angels. On April 21, the Angels selected Adrianza's contract to the major league roster. He played in eight games for the team, hitting .192 with one home run and two RBI, before he was placed on the injured list with back spasms. The Angels released Adrianza on June 15.

Adrianza announced his retirement from professional baseball on December 24, 2024.

== Coaching career ==
On January 6, 2025, Adrianza was hired by the Minnesota Twins to serve as the team's assistant of player development.

== Personal life ==
Adrianza was born to Ehire Sr. and Nitza in 1989. He is married to Vielimar. As of 2014, near the start of his major league career, Adrianza's mother lived in Venezuela. By 2020, his parents, wife, and child had settled in Miami.

On April 5, 2021, Adrianza became a naturalized citizen of the United States. On November 2, 2021, Adrianza was removed from the Braves' World Series roster ahead of Game 6 when his wife went into labor.

He resides in Petaluma, California as of 2025.
