= Trey Harris =

American baseball player (born 1996)

- Outfielder
- Born: January 15, 1996 (age 29); Huntsville, Alabama, U.S.
- Bats: Right Throws: Right

Terone Sevante Harris (born January 15, 1996) is an American former professional baseball outfielder.

== Amateur career ==
Harris attended McEachern High School in Powder Springs, Georgia. In 2014, his senior year, he hit .487 with seven home runs and 31 RBI. Undrafted in the 2014 Major League Baseball draft, Harris enrolled at the University of Missouri where he played college baseball.

In 2015, Harris' freshman year at Missouri, he hit .263 with four home runs and 22 RBI over 53 games, earning a spot on the SEC All-Freshman team. As a sophomore in 2016, he batted .213 with one home runs and 36 RBI in 53 games. After the season, Harris played collegiate summer baseball for the Harwich Mariners of the Cape Cod Baseball League, and also played in the New England Collegiate Baseball League. In 2017, as a junior, he compiled a .268 batting average with a career-high 12 home runs and 48 RBI in 52 games. In 2018, Harris' senior season, he slashed .316/.413/.516 with 11 home runs, fifty RBI, and 12 stolen bases over 56 games.

== Professional career ==
=== Atlanta Braves ===
Harris was drafted by the Atlanta Braves in the 32nd round, with the 952nd overall selection, of the 2018 Major League Baseball draft.

Harris signed with the Braves and made his professional debut with the Rookie-level Gulf Coast League Braves, and, after 22 games, was promoted to the Rome Braves of the Low-A South Atlantic League, with whom he finished the year. Over 53 games between the two teams, he hit .302 with one home run and 29 RBI. In 2019, Harris returned to Rome, with whom he was named an All-Star. In June, he was promoted to the Florida Fire Frogs of the High-A Florida State League, and in July, he was promoted to the Mississippi Braves of the Double-A Southern League, with whom he finished the season. Over 131 games between the three clubs, Harris slashed .323/.389/.498 with 14 home runs and 73 RBI. He was selected to play in the Arizona Fall League for the Scottsdale Scorpions following the season and was named an All-Star.

Harris did not play a minor league game in 2020 due to the cancellation of the minor league season because of the COVID-19 pandemic. For the 2021 season, he returned to Mississippi, now members of the Double-A South, slashing .247/.317/.354 with eight home runs and 50 RBI over 96 games. Harris returned to Mississippi to begin the 2022 season. In 59 games, he batted .238/.338/.323 with two home runs, 16 RBI, and four stolen bases.

=== Washington Nationals ===
On August 1, 2022, Harris was traded to the Washington Nationals in exchange for Ehire Adrianza. He was assigned to the Harrisburg Senators of the Double-A Eastern League. Over 96 games between Mississippi and Harrisburg, Harris batted .241 with five home runs and 27 RBI.

Harris returned to Harrisburg in 2023, playing in 67 games and hitting .249/.323/.343 with two home runs, 26 RBI, and four stolen bases. He split the 2024 campaign between Harrisburg and the High-A Wilmington Blue Rocks. In 84 total appearances, Harris slashed .199/.249/.260 with one home run, 29 RBI, and four stolen bases. He elected free agency following the season on November 4, 2024.

On June 24, 2025, Harris announced his retirement from professional baseball on his personal Instagram account.
