= Spencer Strider =

American baseball player (born 1998)

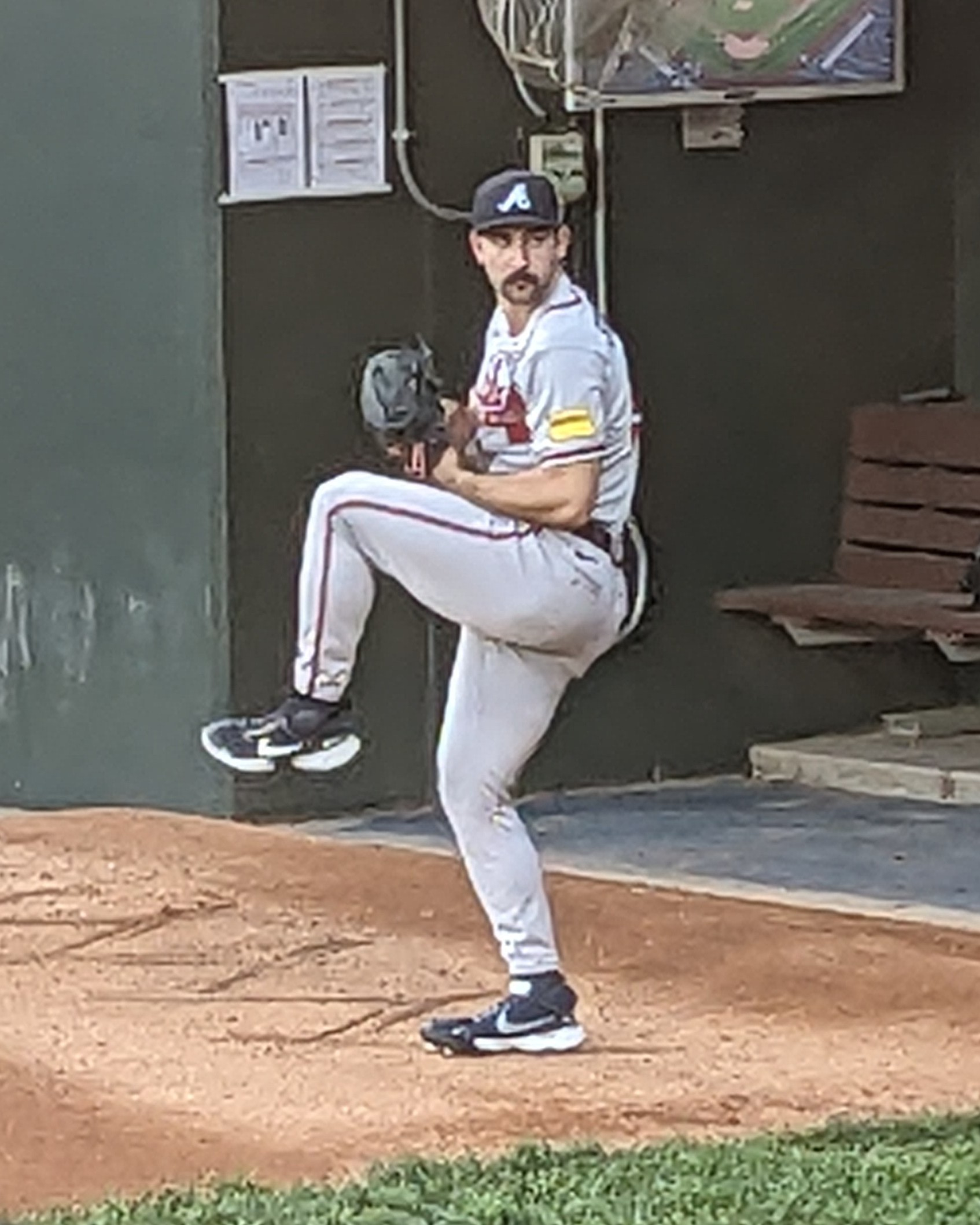
- Strider with the Braves in 2023

Atlanta Braves – No. 99
- Pitcher
- Born: October 28, 1998 (age 27); Columbus, Ohio, U.S.
- Bats: Right Throws: Right

MLB debut
- October 1, 2021, for the Atlanta Braves

MLB statistics (through 2026 season)
- Win–loss record: 43–26
- Earned run average: 3.86
- Strikeouts: 672
- Stats at Baseball Reference

Teams
- Atlanta Braves (2021–present)

Career highlights and awards
- All-Star (2023); All-MLB First Team (2023); MLB wins leader (2023); MLB strikeout leader (2023)

Spencer Robert Strider (born October 28, 1998) is an American professional baseball pitcher for the Atlanta Braves of Major League Baseball (MLB). He played college baseball for the Clemson Tigers, and was drafted by the Braves in the fourth round of the 2020 MLB draft. He made his MLB debut in 2021. Strider was an MLB All-Star in 2023, and led MLB in wins and strikeouts for the season.

== Early life ==
Strider grew up a Cleveland Indians fan in Knoxville, Tennessee, and attended the Christian Academy of Knoxville. As an underclassman, he initially committed to play college baseball at Ohio. He was drafted by the Cleveland Indians in the 35th round of the 2017 Major League Baseball draft, but decided to attend college and did not sign.

== College career ==
Strider decided to play college baseball at Clemson, with the Clemson Tigers.

In his freshman year at Clemson, he posted 5–2 record with a 4.76 earned run average (ERA) and tallied 70 total strikeouts over 51 innings pitched. In 2018, he played collegiate summer baseball with the Falmouth Commodores of the Cape Cod Baseball League. Strider missed the 2019 season after suffering a torn ulnar collateral ligament in his elbow, which required Tommy John surgery.

== Professional career ==
=== Draft and minor leagues ===
He returned from the injury in 2020 and was drafted by the Atlanta Braves with the 126th pick in the fourth round of the 2020 Major League Baseball draft and signed.

Strider split his professional debut of 2021 between the Augusta GreenJackets (A), the Rome Braves (High-A), the Mississippi Braves (AA), and the Gwinnett Stripers (AAA). Between the four stops he posted a 3–7 record with a 3.64 ERA and 153 strikeouts over 94 innings.

=== Atlanta Braves (2021–present) ===
==== 2021 ====
On October 1, 2021, Strider was selected to the Atlanta active roster. He made his major league debut that night, pitching one inning of relief against the New York Mets. Strider earned his first career win on the final day of the season, again facing the Mets in relief. The Braves finished with an 88–73 record, clinching the NL East, and eventually won the 2021 World Series, giving the Braves their first title since 1995.

==== 2022 ====
Strider began the 2022 season on the Braves' Opening Day roster. He began the season in the bullpen and was moved to the starting rotation from May 30 onwards. Strider was named National League Rookie of the Month for July. On September 1, he broke the Braves' record for most strikeouts in a nine-inning game, fanning 16 Colorado Rockies batters in eight shutout innings. On September 18, Strider became the fastest pitcher in either the American League or National League to throw 200 strikeouts in a single season, reaching the milestone in 130 innings pitched. He was also the first rookie in the franchise's modern-era history to strike out 200 batters in a single season. The feat had been accomplished by Bill Stemmyer and Kid Nichols in 1886 and 1890, respectively, while the franchise was known as the Boston Beaneaters. Strider made his final appearance of the 2022 regular season on September 18, and was placed on the 15-day injured list due to an oblique injury on September 24. On October 10, 2022, the Braves and Strider agreed to a 6-year, $75M extension through the 2029 season. For the 2022 regular season, he was 11–5 with a 2.67 ERA in 31 games (20 starts), and struck out 202 batters over 131.2 innings.

Strider recovered from his injury for the 2022 postseason and was placed on the National League Division Series roster, being named the starter in Game 3 versus the Philadelphia Phillies. Strider struggled, pitching just 2.1 innings and earning the loss in a 9–1 defeat; the Phillies would eliminate the Braves in four games. At the end of the season, Strider finished second in the National League Rookie of the Year Award balloting to teammate Michael Harris II. This is the first time that two Braves players have finished first and second in Rookie of the Year voting since Craig Kimbrel and Freddie Freeman in 2011.

==== 2023 ====
Strider became the fastest pitcher in MLB history to attain 100 strikeouts in a season, achieving the feat in 61 innings. The record was previously held by Jacob deGrom. At the midseason, Strider was selected as a reserve starting pitcher for the National League in the 2023 Major League Baseball All-Star Game, his first career All-Star selection.

On August 1, Strider broke his own previously set record for the fastest to attain 200 strikeouts in a season, doing so in 123.1 innings pitched. On September 30, 2023, Strider won his twentieth game of the season and broke John Smoltz's Atlanta Braves record for strikeouts in a season, finishing the year with 281. In 32 starts of 2023, Strider finished with a 20–5 record, 286 strikeouts, and a 3.86 ERA.

==== 2024 ====
In 2024, Strider was named the Opening Day starting pitcher for the first time in his career, supplanting Max Fried. Strider pitched five innings of a no-decision. During Strider's next start, the Braves home opener at Truist Park, he reported elbow discomfort. After magnetic resonance imaging showed damage to the UCL in Strider's right elbow, he was placed on the injured list. On April 13, 2024, the Braves announced that Strider would miss the remainder of the 2024 season after undergoing surgery to repair his UCL.

==== 2025 ====
Strider made his 2025 debut against the Toronto Blue Jays on April 16, 2025, after 376 days since his last start. He pitched five innings, allowing five hits and two runs while walking just one batter and striking out five in a 3–1 loss. In that game, he recorded his 500th career strikeout in the fifth inning, striking out Addison Barger, making him the quickest primary starter to reach that mark, accomplishing it in 334 innings, breaking the previous record of 372 innings by Freddy Peralta. On June 14, Strider struck out thirteen Colorado Rockies batters in six shutout innings, helping the Braves set a franchise record for strikeouts thrown in a single game, as relievers Rafael Montero and Dylan Lee finished the 4–1 victory by recording six more strikeouts.

==== 2026 ====
On March 23, 2026, the Braves placed Strider on the injured list due to a left oblique strain. He was reactivated on May 2. Strider pitched 3 1/3 innings in his season debut against the Colorado Rockies, striking out six batters and walking five. Strider was placed on the 60-day injured list due to right elbow inflammation on June 17. At the trade deadline, it was reported that Strider was in discussions to be moved as part of a package to the Texas Rangers for Jacob deGrom before deGrom invoked his no-trade clause to block the move.

== Pitching style ==
During the 2018 college baseball season, Strider's repertoire included a two-seam fastball, a slurve-like pitch, and a changeup he did not use often. After recovering from Tommy John surgery, Strider began throwing a four-seam fastball, and became more willing to pitch in the upper region of the strike zone.

As of the 2023 season, Strider makes use of two main pitches: a four-seam fastball sitting 97–98 mph, which he throws 60 percent of the time; and a slider sitting 85–86 mph, which he throws 35 percent of the time. Additionally, Strider throws a changeup sitting 87–88 mph around 5 percent of the time, usually against left-handed hitters.

Strider began throwing a curveball before the 2024 regular season.

== Personal life ==
Strider is a vegan. Before tournaments, Strider's high school teammates grew facial hair and dyed their hair blond as a bonding exercise. He maintained a mustache during his collegiate baseball career at Clemson, where he became known as "the Mustache Man." In high school, Strider wore uniform number 28. Because that number was assigned to Clemson teammate Seth Beer, Strider wore 29 while playing for the Tigers. As the Braves had retired 29 for pitcher John Smoltz, and 28 was assigned to Matt Olson, Strider wore 65 during his rookie season, then subsequently chose 99 to commemorate Rick Vaughn, a character in the 1989 film Major League.

Strider married his wife, Maggie, whom he met in high school, before the 2023 season. The Striders partnered with the Atlanta Braves Foundation and Georgia Kids Belong to start Foster Family Fridays, an initiative for foster parents and children to attend Braves games.

Strider publicly supports left-wing politics and has praised former Democratic Party presidential candidate Bernie Sanders. He often talks about his love for indie rock music, and on September 12, 2024, he threw out a first pitch at a Faye Webster concert.
