= Jackson Stephens (baseball) =

American baseball player (born 1994)

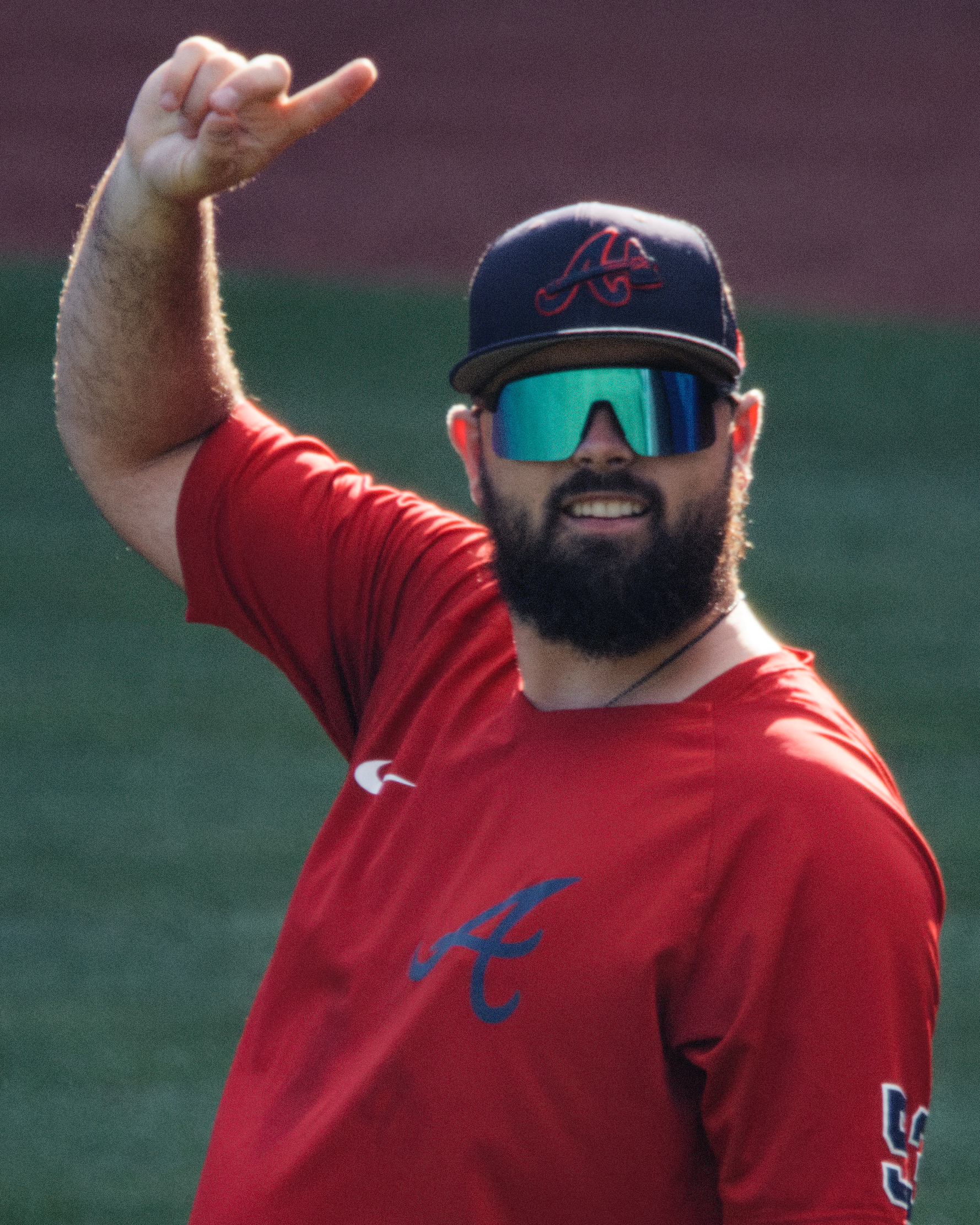
- Stephens with the Braves in 2022

Uni-President Lions – No. 42
- Pitcher
- Born: May 11, 1994 (age 32); Oxford, Alabama, U.S.
- Bats: Right Throws: Right

Professional debut
- MLB: July 1, 2017, for the Cincinnati Reds
- CPBL: September 10, 2025, for the Uni-President Lions

MLB statistics (through 2024 season)
- Win–loss record: 7–7
- Earned run average: 4.15
- Strikeouts: 114

CPBL statistics (through 2025 season)
- Win–loss record: 2-1
- Earned run average: 2.22
- Strikeouts: 20
- Stats at Baseball Reference

Teams
- Cincinnati Reds (2017–2018); Atlanta Braves (2022–2024); Uni-President Lions (2025–present)

Jackson Tanner Stephens (born May 11, 1994) is an American professional baseball pitcher for the Uni-President Lions of the Chinese Professional Baseball League (CPBL). He has previously played in Major League Baseball (MLB) for the Cincinnati Reds and Atlanta Braves. He was drafted by the Reds in the 18th round of the 2012 MLB draft and made his MLB debut with them in 2017.

== Career ==
=== Cincinnati Reds ===
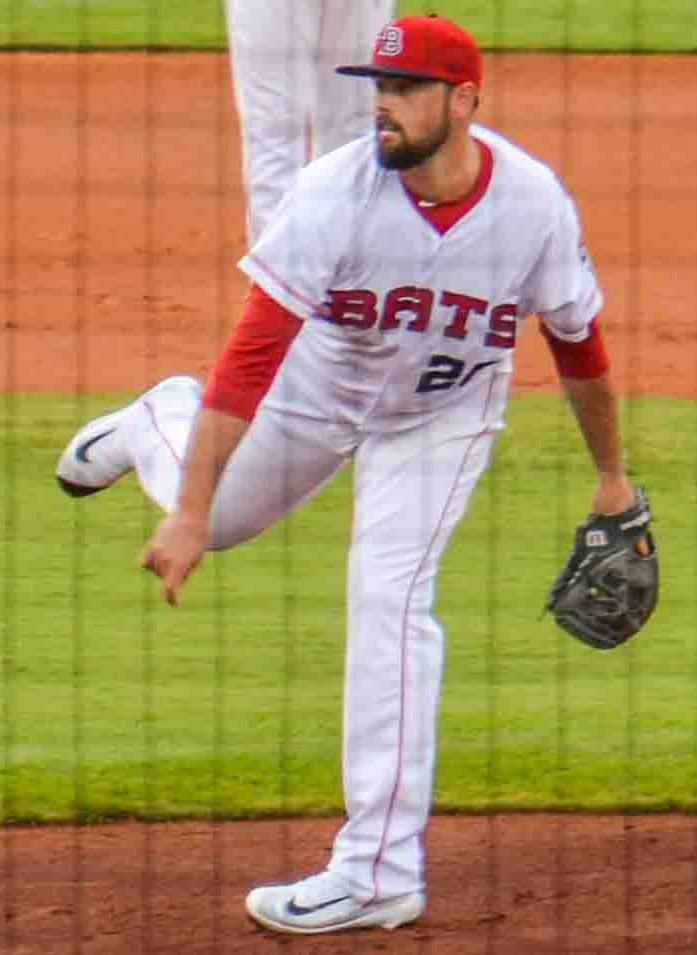
Stephens with the Louisville Bats in 2017

Stephens attended Oxford High School in Oxford, Alabama and was drafted by the Cincinnati Reds in the 18th round of the 2012 Major League Baseball draft. He signed with the Reds, forgoing his commitment to play college baseball at the University of Alabama, and made his professional debut that same season with the Arizona League Reds, going 1–1 with a 4.64 ERA in twenty relief appearances. In 2013, he played for the Dayton Dragons where he pitched to a 3–7 record and 4.59 ERA in 14 games (six starts) and in 2014, he returned to Daytona, going 2–7 with a 4.81 ERA in 14 games started. Stephens spent 2015 with the Daytona Tortugas where he compiled a 12–7 record and a career best 2.97 ERA in 26 starts, and he spent 2016 with the Pensacola Blue Wahoos where he went 8–11 with a 3.33 ERA in 27 games (26 starts).

The Reds added him to their 40-man roster after the 2016 season. He began 2017 with the Louisville Bats.

Stephens was initially called up by the Reds at the end of May 2017 as an emergency relief pitcher but did not make an appearance. The Reds then recalled Stephens once again on July 1 to make his major league debut against the Chicago Cubs. Stephens pitched 5.0 innings in his debut, striking out 8. He also had a two RBI single in the 4th to tie the game for the Reds. He was optioned back to Louisville the day after, and was recalled once again in September. In 26 games for Louisville he was 7–10 with a 4.92 ERA, and in seven games for the Reds he compiled a 2–1 record and 4.68 ERA.

Stephens began 2018 in Cincinnati's bullpen. In 29 games, he pitched in 38 1/3 innings, holding an ERA of 4.93 with 33 strikeouts. Stephens spent the entirety of the 2019 campaign with Louisville, posting an 8–4 record and 5.14 ERA with 80 strikeouts across 84 innings of work. On November 4, 2019, he was removed from the 40–man roster and sent outright to Triple–A, after which he subsequently elected free agency.

=== Tecolotes de los Dos Laredos ===
On June 4, 2021, Stephens signed with the Tecolotes de los Dos Laredos of the Mexican League.

=== Atlanta Braves ===
On January 12, 2022, Stephens signed a minor league contract with the Atlanta Braves organization. On April 12, Stephens' contract was selected by the Braves. He pitched the final three innings of a 16–4 victory against the Washington Nationals that night in his first career save. While facing the St. Louis Cardinals on August 26, a line drive hit by Brendan Donovan struck Stephens in the head. He was placed on the seven-day injured list with a concussion. Stephens returned to the team on September 4. He finished the regular season with a 3.69 ERA Across 39 appearances, including one start and two saves. Stephens made the Braves' postseason roster for the national league division series against the Philadelphia Phillies. He appeared in one game in which he pitched two scoreless innings.

On November 15, Stephens was designated for assignment by the Braves following the acquisition of Dennis Santana. On November 18, Stephens was non–tendered and became a free agent. On December 26, 2022, the Braves re–signed Stephens to a one-year, $740,000 contract. On March 13, 2023, Stephens was removed from the 40–man roster and sent outright to Triple–A Gwinnett. In 12 appearances for Gwinnett, he logged a 3.28 ERA with 26 strikeouts in 24 2/3 innings pitched. On September 11, the Braves selected Stephens' contract, adding him to the major league roster. In 5 games, he logged a 3.00 ERA with 11 strikeouts in 12.0 innings of work. Following the season on November 6, Stephens was removed from the 40–man roster and sent outright to Triple–A Gwinnett; he elected free agency the same day.

On November 29, 2023, Stephens re–signed with the Braves on a major league contract. However, on March 26, 2024, he was removed from the 40–man roster and sent outright to Triple–A Gwinnett. However, he rejected the assignment and became a free agent. On April 2, Stephens re–signed with the Braves on a minor league contract. On May 4, the Braves selected Stephens' contract, adding him to the major league roster. In three appearances for the Braves, he recorded a 2.70 ERA with two strikeouts. On May 18, Stephens was removed from the 40–man roster and sent outright to Triple–A Gwinnett. The next day, he rejected the assignment in favor of free agency. On May 20, Stephens re–signed with the Braves on another minor league contract. He elected free agency following the season on November 4.

On February 24, 2025, Stephens re-signed with the Braves organization on a minor league contract. In 22 appearances for Triple-A Gwinnett, he compiled a 4-0 record and 2.57 ERA with 42 strikeouts over 49 innings of work. Stephens was released by Atlanta on August 14.

=== Uni-President Lions ===
On August 22, 2025, Stephens signed with the Uni-President Lions of the Chinese Professional Baseball League. He made four starts for the Lions, logging a 2-1 record and 2.22 ERA with 20 strikeouts across 24 1/3 innings pitched.

On December 30, 2025, Stephens re-signed with the Lions.
