= Max Fried =

American baseball player (born 1994)

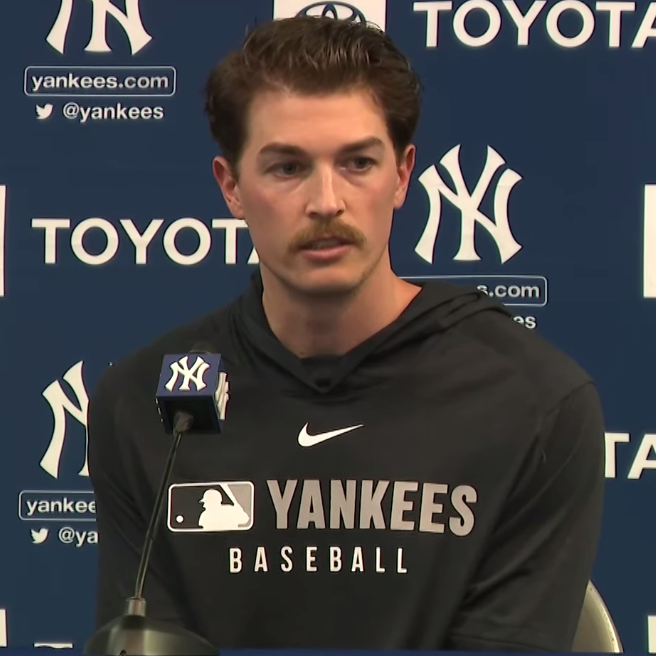
- Fried with the New York Yankees in 2025

New York Yankees – No. 54
- Pitcher
- Born: January 18, 1994 (age 32); Santa Monica, California, U.S.
- Bats: Left Throws: Left

MLB debut
- August 8, 2017, for the Atlanta Braves

MLB statistics (through 2026 season)
- Win–loss record: 97–46
- Earned run average: 3.01
- Strikeouts: 1,156
- Stats at Baseball Reference

Teams
- Atlanta Braves (2017–2024); New York Yankees (2025–present)

Career highlights and awards
- 3× All-Star (2022, 2024, 2025); World Series champion (2021); 2× All-MLB First Team (2020, 2025); 4× Gold Glove Award (2020–2022, 2025); 2× Fielding Bible Award (2020, 2025); Silver Slugger Award (2021); MLB wins leader (2025)
Medals
Men's Baseball
Representing United States
Maccabiah Games
Gold medal – first place	2009 Israel	Team

Max Dorian Fried (/ˈfriːd/ FREED; born January 18, 1994) is an American professional baseball pitcher for the New York Yankees of Major League Baseball (MLB). He debuted with the Atlanta Braves in 2017.

Fried was selected by the San Diego Padres in the first round, seventh overall of the 2012 MLB draft. He was traded to the Braves in 2014. He was second in the National League in wins with 17 in 2019 and 7 in 2020. Fried pitched 6 shutout innings in the final game of the 2021 World Series against the Houston Astros, helping lead the Braves to their first championship in 26 years. Through 2024, Fried had the fourth best career win–loss percentage of all Braves pitchers, at .670.

Fried is a three-time MLB All-Star and is also a good fielder and hitter for a pitcher. In 2020, he won the NL Gold Glove Award at pitcher and the Fielding Bible Award at pitcher. In 2021, he won the Gold Glove Award again, as well as the Silver Slugger Award for pitchers, becoming the third pitcher in MLB history to win both awards in the same year. He was also named to the All-MLB Team those two years. In 2022, he won his third consecutive Gold Glove Award at pitcher., and he won it again in 2025. As of the end of the 2026 regular season, he led all active MLB pitchers in career win-loss percentage (.678), was second in home runs per 9 innings (0.710), third in ERA (3.01), and 4th in range factor/game as pitcher (1.23).

== Early life ==
Fried was born on January 18, 1994, in Santa Monica, California. He grew up in Encino, Los Angeles, the middle son of Carrie and Jonathan Fried, and is Jewish. His younger brother Jake, also a pitcher, attended the University of Arizona. Max began attending the Reggie Smith Baseball Academy in Encino as a seven year old and learned how to throw a curveball from the retired outfielder. Fried pitched for the 2009 Maccabiah Games Team USA Juniors baseball team that won a gold medal in Israel.

Fried first attended Montclair College Preparatory School, in Van Nuys, where he played baseball, football, and basketball. As a sophomore, with Ethan Katz as his pitching coach, he was 10–3 with a 1.81 earned run average (ERA), and was named the Olympic League's most valuable player and to the All-California Interscholastic Federation (CIF) Division V first team. In his junior year, Fried was 7–3 with a 1.31 ERA, with 100 strikeouts in 69 innings, as he also played outfield and batted .360 with four home runs and 30 RBIs. He was named the 2011 Southern California Jewish Sports Hall of Fame Male High School Athlete of the Year.

After Montclair Prep cut its baseball team subsequent to his junior year, Fried transferred to Harvard-Westlake School in Los Angeles for his senior season. He wore uniform number 32 in honor of Sandy Koufax and played with fellow future MLB pitchers Lucas Giolito and Jack Flaherty. In 2012, Fried was 8–2 with a 2.02 ERA, and 105 strikeouts in 66 innings. He was a Rawlings-Perfect Game 1st Team All-American.

== Draft and minor leagues ==
=== Draft (2012) ===
The San Diego Padres selected Fried in the first round with the seventh overall selection of the 2012 Major League Baseball draft. Fried chose to sign with the Padres for $3 million, forgoing his commitment to the UCLA Bruins baseball team. Baseball America rated him the top left-handed pitcher in the draft.

=== San Diego Padres (2012–2014) ===
Fried made his professional debut for the Arizona League Padres in 2012 and spent the whole season there, going 0–1 with a 3.57 ERA in 17 2/3 innings pitched. He played for the Fort Wayne TinCaps in 2013 where he compiled a 6–7 record and 3.49 ERA in 23 starts. At the end of the year, Fried was ranked the 43rd-best prospect in the minors by MLBPipeline. He was also named an MiLB.com Padres Organization All Star, and Baseball America ranked his curveball as the best in the Padres' minor league system.

In 2014, he was ranked the Padres' top pitching prospect, and their No. 2 prospect overall, by MLB.com. Fried was injured for much of the year and did not make his season debut until July. The next month, on August 20, Fried underwent Tommy John surgery; he missed the remainder of the 2014 season.

=== Atlanta Braves (2014–2017) ===
On December 19, 2014, the Padres traded Fried, Jace Peterson, Dustin Peterson, and Mallex Smith to the Atlanta Braves for Justin Upton and Aaron Northcraft. Fried missed the entire 2015 season while recovering from Tommy John surgery.

Fried returned to action on April 9, 2016, for the Rome Braves. He spent all of 2016 with Rome, pitching to an 8–7 record and a 3.93 ERA in 21 games (20 starts), striking out 112 batters in 103 innings. Fried ended the season ranked by Baseball America as the 6th-best prospect in the South Atlantic League. His fastball, clocked at 93–94 mph, reached 96–97 mph in the second half of the season. The Braves added Fried to their 40-man roster after the season.

Fried was invited to spring training for the first time at the start of the 2017 season. He began the season with the Double-A Mississippi Braves. He was ranked as the Braves' No. 8 prospect overall by MLB.com in May and 89th best prospect in July. Fried was named Southern League Pitcher of the Week for the week ending April 30.

== Major leagues ==
=== Atlanta Braves (2017–2024) ===
==== 2017: Major league debut ====
Fried was called up to the Atlanta Braves on August 5, 2017. He debuted on August 8, throwing two scoreless innings against the Philadelphia Phillies, displaying what David O'Brien of The Atlanta Journal-Constitution called "a devastating curveball". Two weeks later, Fried returned to the minor leagues, joining the Triple-A Gwinnett Braves. In 26 innings pitched for the Braves for the season, he was 1–1 with a 3.81 ERA.

At the end of the 2017 season, Fried joined the Peoria Javelinas of the Arizona Fall League, for whom he was named league Player of the Week on October 31. He led the league with 32 strikeouts in 26 innings (third in the league), and was 3–1 with a 1.73 ERA (6th) in six starts. He ranked first among starters with a .163 opponents' batting average, was second in fewest-baserunners-allowed-per-nine-innings (7.96), and was named to the AFL's Top Prospects Team. Baseball America rated him # 3 on the AFL Hot Sheet. In December, Braves manager Brian Snitker said that he might look at Fried, Lucas Sims, or another pitcher as the team's fifth starter in 2018.

==== 2018 ====
Fried began the 2018 season with the Double-A Mississippi Braves. After one game, he re-joined Gwinnett, now named the Stripers. He was called up to Atlanta in late April. In 33 2/3 innings pitched for the Braves in the 2018 regular season, he was 1–4 with 44 strikeouts and a 2.94 ERA. With runners in scoring position he kept batters to one hit in 30 at bats (.033); and with RISP and two outs, opposing batters were 0-for-14 with eight strikeouts.

==== 2019 ====
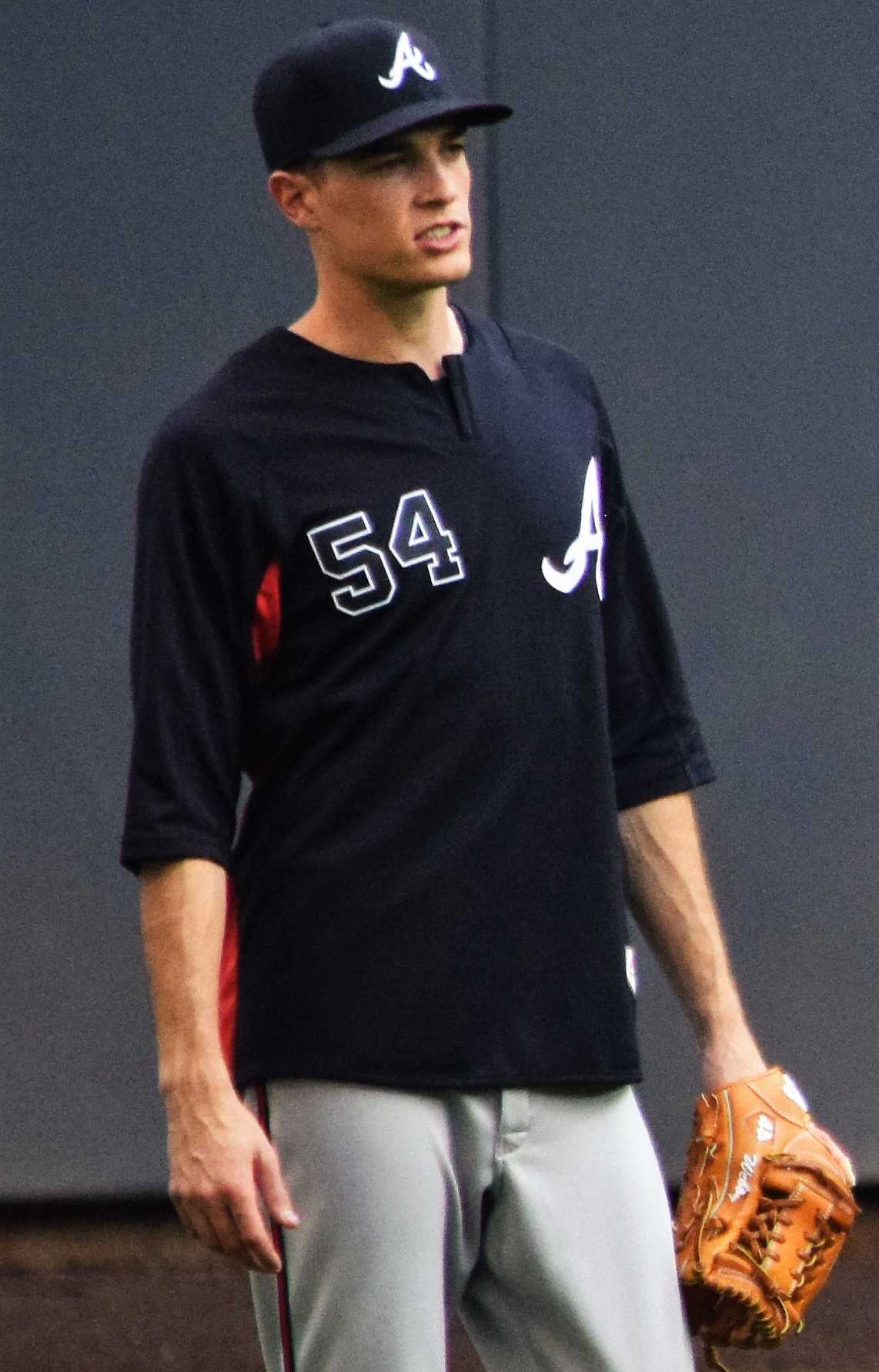
Fried in 2019

Fried was placed in the bullpen at the start of the 2019 season, and later moved to the starting rotation. Against the Los Angeles Dodgers on May 7, Fried was hit on his left hand by a ball hit by Alex Verdugo and left the game, but he made his next regularly scheduled start.

In 2019, Fried was 17–6 with a 4.02 ERA, as in 33 games (30 starts) he pitched 165 2/3 innings in which he struck out 173 batters. His 17 wins were second in the National League, and his .739 won-loss percentage was fifth in the league. He induced the second-lowest percentage of fly balls (22.2%), and the third-highest percentage of ground balls (53.6%), of all NL pitchers, and threw his curveball 24.6% of the time (sixth most frequent in the league). His 9.398 strikeouts per nine innings were, at the time, the fifth-highest in a single season in franchise history.

On defense, he led all NL pitchers with 34 assists, and had the second-best range factor per 9 innings of 2.23. He had 6 Defensive Runs Saved (DRS), the best in the major leagues among pitchers. Fried also batted .196 (9th among NL pitchers)/.262 (6th)/.268 (10th), and led all NL pitchers with at least 50 plate appearances in runs (11) and BB/SO ratio (0.31), while having the second-lowest swinging strike percentage (7.1%), third highest contact percentage (81.6%), and tying for third in walks (5).

==== 2020: Gold Glove and Fielding Bible Awards, All-MLB First Team ====
During the 2020 season, Fried developed into Atlanta's ace. In the pandemic-shortened season, Fried had a 7–0 win–loss record with a 2.25 ERA and a 1.09 walks plus hits per inning pitched (WHIP). He led the major leagues in win–loss percentage (1.000) and pickoffs (4), led National League pitchers in Wins Above Replacement (WAR) (2.9), was second in the NL in WAR (all behind Mookie Betts), and tied for second in the NL in wins. He limited hard contact, holding batters to an average exit velocity on batted balls of 83.4 mph and hard-hit balls to 23.8%, both among the lowest 2% of all major league pitchers.

His four pickoffs through September 6 were the most in the majors in 2020, and he needed only 12 pickoff attempts to do so. Since his major league debut in 2017, Fried's 14 pickoffs were the most in the majors, and he was successful on 19% of his attempts. During that span, major league pitchers were successful in picking off runners in only 0.017% of attempts. Fried started the season by not allowing any home runs through eight starts with his team winning every game, the first left-handed pitcher to do so since Babe Ruth in 1917.

On defense, Fried led all major league pitchers in assists for the second consecutive season (with 15), tied for the MLB lead in pickoffs (with 4; with his 9 in 2019–20 he was tops in major league baseball), and led all pitchers with five Defensive Runs Saved.

Fried won the 2020 NL Gold Glove Award at pitcher. He became the fourth Braves pitcher to win the award, joining Mike Hampton, Greg Maddux, and Phil Niekro, and the first Braves player to win the award for a pitcher in 17 years. He also won the 2020 Fielding Bible Award at pitcher. The award honors the top fielder in the Major Leagues at pitcher. He came in fifth in voting for the 2020 NL Cy Young Award. He was named a starter on the 2020 All-MLB First Team.

==== 2021: Silver Slugger and Gold Glove Awards, All-MLB Second Team, World Series Champion ====
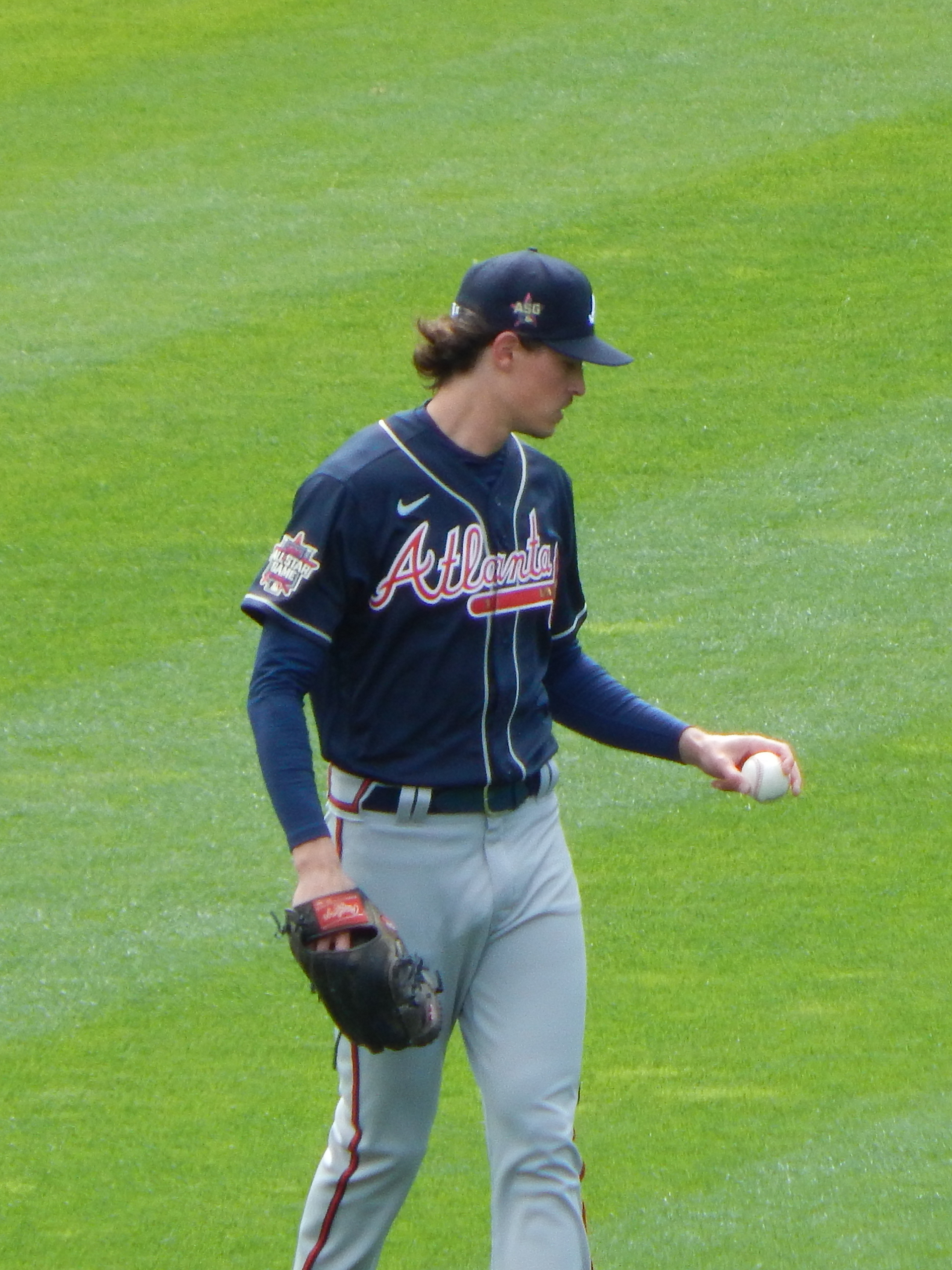
Fried in 2021

Fried was the Braves' 2021 Opening Day starting pitcher. His first career complete game shutout was a Maddux, pitched against the Baltimore Orioles on August 20, 2021. Fried threw a second Maddux on September 24, while facing the San Diego Padres. His 1.76 ERA and 0.84 WHIP in the second half of the season were the best in the major leagues. He was named the National League Pitcher of the Month for September, after posting a 1.54 ERA.

In the 2021 regular season, Fried was 14–7 with a 3.04 ERA (9th in the National League), and his 14 wins were 5th in the NL. In 28 starts he threw 2 shutouts (leading the league), as in 165.2 innings he averaged 7.5 hits, 0.8 home runs (3rd), and 2.2 walks per 9 innings, for a 1.087 WHIP. His 8.584 strikeouts/9 innings were the 11th-most in Braves history. His 51.8% ground ball percentage was 3rd-highest in the NL, and he induced softly hit balls 20.0% of the time (5th).

As a batter, he hit .273/.322/.327. His batting average and on-base percentage led all pitchers, while his slugging percentage ranked second. He scored 7 runs (2nd), hit three doubles (2nd), and drove in 5 RBIs (6th) in 55 at bats, had the second-highest exit velocity of all pitchers (90.3 mph), had 8 sacrifice hits (8th of all players), and was called upon to pinch hit four times. On July 4, 2021, he had a pinch-hit, walk-off, single against the Miami Marlins.

On defense, Fried led NL pitchers in range factor per game (1.61), assists (37) for the third consecutive season, and Defensive Runs Saved for the third season in a row (6). For the second consecutive season he tied for the major league lead in pickoffs (6).

In the three years in which Fried was a starter, from 2019 to 2021, he led all National League pitchers in wins (38), was tied for the lead in shutouts (2), was second in the vertical movement of his curveball (−11.6 inches; batters hit .183/.218/.294 against it), and had the third-lowest barrels percentage in balls hit against him (5.0%). In those three years on offense he led NL pitchers in runs (18), doubles (7), on base percentage (.292), and WAR (1.3), was 2nd-lowest in strikeout percentage (25.8%), and third in batting average (.234), slugging percentage (.297), OPS (.589), and walks (9). In those three years on defense he led all NL pitchers in assists (86).

Fried won the final game of the 2021 World Series with six shutout innings against the Astros, who had led the majors in batting average and runs for the season, with Houston's three-time batting champion Jose Altuve observing: "He was almost unhittable."

Fried won the 2021 NL Gold Glove Award at pitcher, winning the award for the second consecutive year. He became the third Braves pitcher to win multiple Gold Glove Awards, joining Greg Maddux and Phil Niekro. Major League managers and coaches (voting only within their league, and unable to vote for players on their own team), account for 75% of the selection process, while the other 25% is a sabermetric component.

Fried also won the 2021 NL Silver Slugger Award for pitchers. The award was given to the top offensive player at pitcher in the NL, as determined by a vote by the manager and three coaches of each MLB team (and no manager/coach can vote for a player on his own team). Fried became the third MLB pitcher in history to win both the Silver Slugger Award and the Gold Glove Award in the same season, joining Mike Hampton (2003) and Zack Greinke (2019). Fried was the final recipient of the Silver Slugger Award for pitchers, as the National League permanently implemented the designated hitter in 2022.

He was named a starter on the 2021 All-MLB Second Team, his second consecutive All-MLB selection. Through 2021, of the Braves career leaders, Fried was second in win–loss percentage (.690; behind Russ Ortiz and ahead of Greg Maddux).

==== 2022: All Star and Gold Glove Award ====
Fried was named to his second straight Opening Day start in 2022. Fried's salary for the 2022 season was set at $6.85 million via arbitration. He was named to the 2022 Major League Baseball All-Star Game roster.

For the season, Fried was 14–7 with a 2.48 ERA (third in the NL; 10th-lowest in Atlanta franchise history), in 30 starts in which he pitched 185.1 innings with 170 strikeouts. He gave up the lowest percentage of hard-hit balls in the NL (24.5%) and had the lowest barrel-percentage against (4.0%), was 2nd in fewest walks/9 innings (1.55), 3rd in strikeouts/walk (5.31) and fewest home runs/9 innings (0.58), 4th in ground ball percentage (51.2%), and tied for 5th in highest LOB (78.2%). His curveball had the most vertical movement among NL pitchers, the exit velocity of balls hit against him (86.2 mph) was the third-lowest in the NL, and batters swung at his pitches outside the strike zone 36.8% of the time, the fourth-highest rate in the NL.

In the four seasons from 2019 to 2022, he had the lowest barrel-percentage against (4.6%) of all major league pitchers, meaning he limited hard contact likely to result in extra base hits, and his 52 wins were second in the major leagues to Gerrit Cole's 56 wins. On defense, opponents became hesitant to run on him. Since his major league debut in 2017, his 23 pickoffs led the majors, with him having picked the runner off in 14.29% of his career pickoff attempts, a much higher percentage than the league average of 1.6%.

Fried was named the 2022 NL Gold Glove Award winner at pitcher, his third straight Gold Glove Award. He became the first Braves pitcher since Greg Maddux to win three straight Gold Glove Awards. The only other pitchers who have won the award three times in a row have been Harvey Haddix, Bobby Shantz, Bob Gibson, Phil Niekro, and Zack Greinke. Fried finished second in the voting for the 2022 NL Cy Young Award. It was the second time in three years he finished in the top five in Cy Young Award voting, as he had finished fifth in 2020. At the end of the 2022 season, Fried was selected to his third consecutive All-MLB team. Also, in 2022 he was inducted into the Southern California Jewish Sports Hall of Fame.

==== 2023 ====
Fried's 2023 season salary of $13.5 million was again determined by arbitration. He was the Opening Day starter for the third straight season. He spent time on the 15-day injured list in early April and early May, first for a strained left hamstring, then a strained left forearm. On June 5, Fried was transferred to the 60-day injured list. He was activated on August 4.

In the 2023 regular season Fried was 8–1 with a 2.55 ERA (the second-lowest in the major leagues among pitchers with at least 14 starts), as in 14 starts he had one shutout, and struck out 80 batters while giving up 18 walks in 77.2 innings. Batters hit .109 against his curveball. Of NL pitchers who pitched 70 or more innings in 2023, he was 2nd in ground ball percentage (57.7%) and lowest hard-hit percentage (24.2%), 3rd in lowest barrel percentage (3.8%), 5th in ERA, 6th in left-on-base percentage (82.3%) and lowest average exit velocity (86.5 mph), 7th in lowest line drive percentage (16.8%), and 9th in home runs/9 innings (0.81).

He ended the season as the Braves' career leader in won-loss percentage (.705), second in strikeouts/9 innings pitched (8.835), fourth in strikeouts/walk (3.688), eighth in WHIP (1.163), and 10th in hits per nine innings pitched (8.075).

From the beginning of his first full season in 2019 to the end of the 2023 regular season, Fried recorded 60 wins, the most in the NL and second in MLB to Gerrit Cole's 71 victories during this time period. His 25 pickoffs since debuting in 2017 were the most in major league baseball, and in his career he had picked off a runner in 14.5% of his pickoff attempts, much higher than the MLB average during that period of 1.7%.

==== 2024: All Star ====
Fried and the Braves agreed to a one-year $15 million contract for the 2024 season, his final season before free agency. Fried's streak of Opening Day starts was ended by Spencer Strider. In Fried's season debut, the second game of the year against the Philadelphia Phillies, he recorded only two outs. On April 23, Fried pitched a complete game shutout against the Miami Marlins, facing 29 hitters and throwing 92 pitches for his third career Maddux. He pitched a scoreless inning for the NL team in the All Star Game, the second of his career.

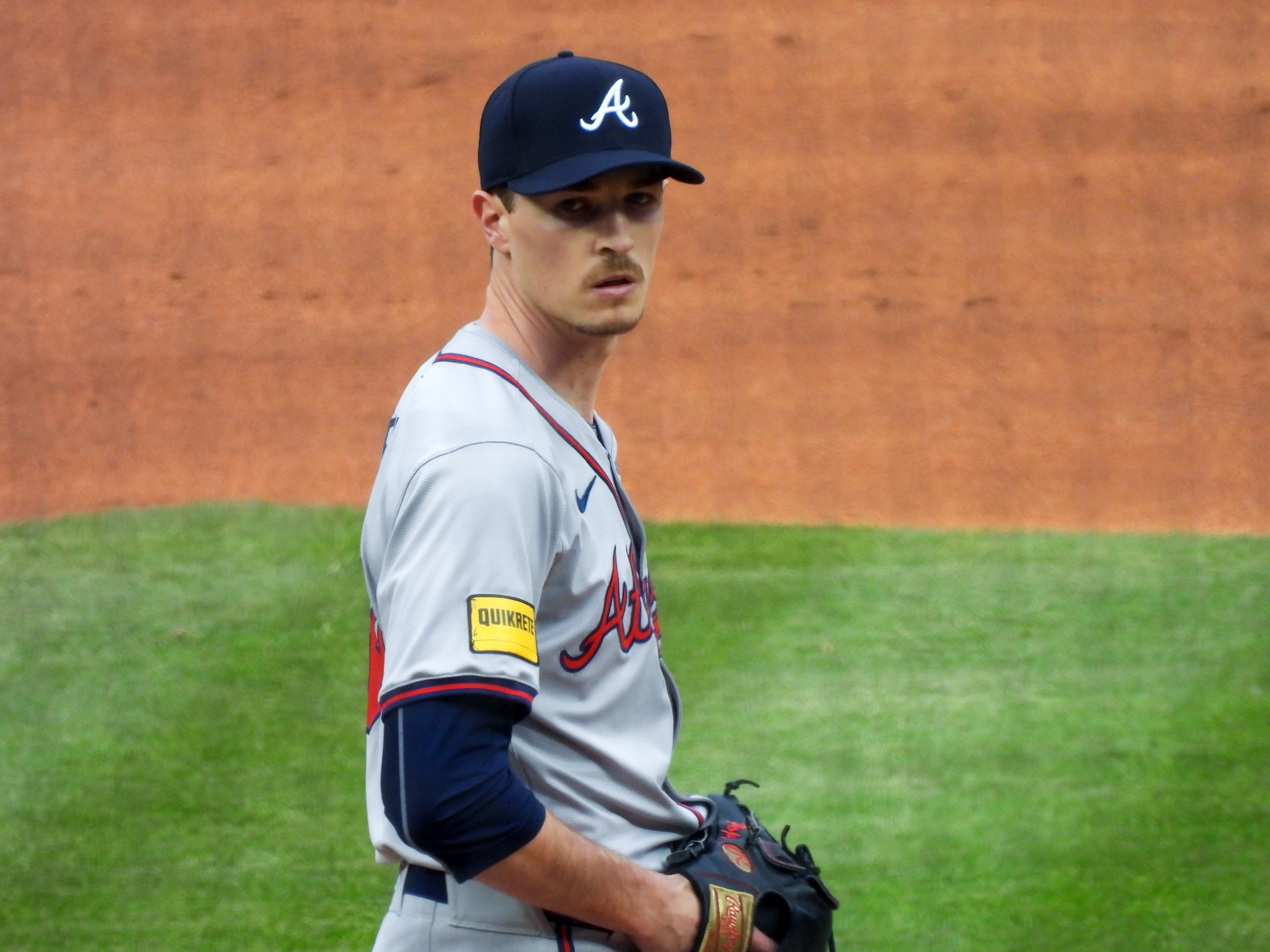
Fried with Atlanta in 2024

In 2024, Fried was 11–10 with one shutout in 29 starts covering 174.1 innings, in which he gave up 146 hits and 57 walks while striking out 166 batters, and led the NL in ground ball percentage (58.8%) while having the second-lowest exit velocity (86.3 mph) and percentage of "hard speed" contact induced (26.1%). He had a 3.25 ERA (5th in the NL), with 7.5 hits per 9 innings (7th), 0.64 home runs per 9 innings (4th), and a 1.164 WHIP (8th), keeping opposing batters to a .225 batting average (7th), while on defense he tied for the league lead with a 1.000 fielding percentage. Fried received a qualifying offer from the Braves at the end of the season, which he declined.

Fried finished his stint with Atlanta as one of the franchises' best pitchers on a rate basis, ranking in the top 10 in win–loss percentage, WHIP, and strikeout-to-walk ratio.

=== New York Yankees (2025–present) ===
==== 2025:All Star, Gold Glove, Fielding Bible Award, All-MLB First Team ====
Fried with the Yankees in 2025

On December 17, 2024, Fried signed an eight-year, $218 million contract with the New York Yankees. It was the largest contract issued to a left-handed pitcher and the fourth-largest deal for any pitcher in MLB history.

Fried made his Yankees debut against the Milwaukee Brewers on March 29, 2025. He pitched 4 2/3 innings, allowed seven hits and two runs, and walked two batters while striking out four. On April 4, he recorded his first win as a Yankee in a 9-4 victory over the Pittsburgh Pirates as he pitched 5 2/3 innings, allowed six hits and one run, and walked just one batter while striking out six. On April 9, Fried recorded his sixth career 10+ strikeout game to help the Yankees beat the Detroit Tigers, 4–3. On April 20, Fried lost a no-hit bid in the Yankees' 4-0 win over the Tampa Bay Rays due to a single by Chandler Simpson off the glove of Paul Goldschmidt, when the official scorer changed his sixth-inning call to a hit after originally calling it an error. Fried was named the American League Pitcher of the Month for April, after posting a 5-0 record and a 1.19 ERA. On August 16, Fried recorded his 1,000th career strikeout when he struck out Alec Burleson in the second inning in a 12-8 victory. Fried was again named AL Pitcher of the Month in September 2025, having pitched to a 1.89 ERA across five starts, with 35 strikeouts over 33 1/3 innings.

In 2025, he was 19-5 with a 2.86 ERA (4th in the AL) in 195.1 innings over 32 starts. He led American League pitchers in wins, win-loss percentage (.792), and range factor/game as pitcher (1.53), and was 2nd in home runs allowed per 9 innings (0.645), and 7th in strikeouts (189), and 9th in WHIP (1.101). On defense, he led the AL and set a career high with eight pickoffs. Batters hit .223/.281/.334 against him.

In Game 1 of the 2025 American League Wild Card Series against the Red Sox, Fried pitched 6 1/3 innings as he allowed four hits, no runs, and walked three batters while striking out six, but he got a no-decision in his first postseason start as a Yankee. He also became the first pitcher with a scoreless start of 6+ innings in a Yankee playoff debut since Mike Mussina in the 2001 ALDS. The Red Sox won the game 3–1.

On November 2, 2025, Fried won his fourth career Gold Glove Award and his first as an American League pitcher. He also won his second Fielding Bible Award, and was named All-MLB First Team. He finished fourth in the Cy Young Award voting.

==== 2026 ====
On Opening Night 2026, Fried pitched 6 1/3 innings, allowing only two hits, no runs, and walking only one batter while striking out four in a 7–0 road victory over the San Francisco Giants. Fried left his 10th start of the season, against the Orioles on May 13, after only 61 pitches, in what was later cited as "left elbow posterior soreness." He missed a little more than two months of the season, returning on July 22 with 5 scoreless innings against the Pirates. On August 17, 2026, Fried was again placed on the injured list due to a bone bruise in his left elbow.

In 2026, he was 5-5 with a 2.80 ERA in 112.2 innings over 20 starts. Of MLB pitchers with 110 or more innings, he had the fewest home runs per 9 innings (0.32), the lowest hard-hit percentage against (27.5%), the lowest barrel percentage against (2.4%), the second-lowest line drive percentage against (14.5%), and the fifth-lowest batting average against. He had a number of career-lows, including a 0.994 WHIP, he gave up 6.3 hits per 9 innings, and the batting line against him was .201/.264/.274. He ended the season leading all active MLB pitchers in career win-loss percentage (.678), second in home runs per 9 innings (0.710), third in ERA (3.01), and 4th in range factor/game as pitcher (1.23).

On November 10, it was revealed that Fried underwent surgery in his left elbow to remove a bone spur.

== Pitching style ==
Fried throws a 94–96-mile-per-hour (151–154 km/h) four-seam fastball. He also throws two types of a 74-mile-per-hour (119 km/h) "plus" curveball (which he patterned after that of Sandy Koufax), an 85-mile-per-hour (137 km/h) slider (since 2019), a 93-mile-per-hour (150 km/h) sinker, and an 86-mile-per-hour (138 km/h) change-up, with the curveball resulting in the lowest batting average in 2021 (.160).

== See also ==
- List of Gold Glove Award winners at pitcher
- List of Silver Slugger Award winners at pitcher
- List of baseball players who underwent Tommy John surgery
- List of Jewish Major League Baseball players
- List of Jews in Sports
- List of Major League Baseball annual shutout leaders
- List of World Series starting pitchers

Awards and achievements
Preceded by Adam Wainwright	National League Pitcher of the Month; September 2021	Succeeded by Pablo López
Preceded by Corbin Burnes	American League Pitcher of the Month; April 2025	Succeeded by Kris Bubic
Preceded by Trevor Rogers	American League Pitcher of the Month; September 2025	Succeeded by José Soriano
