= Vaughn Grissom =

American baseball player (born 2001)

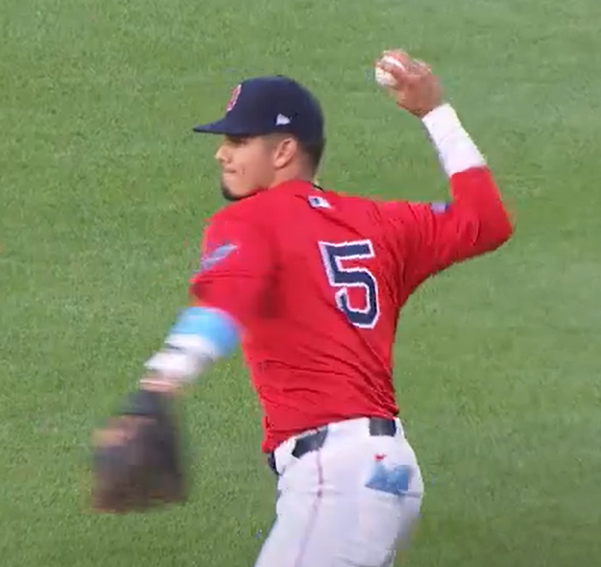
- Grissom with the Red Sox in 2024

Los Angeles Angels – No. 5
- Second baseman / Shortstop
- Born: January 5, 2001 (age 25); Orlando, Florida, U.S.
- Bats: Right Throws: Right

MLB debut
- August 10, 2022, for the Atlanta Braves

MLB statistics (through 2026 season)
- Batting average: .248
- Home runs: 18
- Runs batted in: 105
- Stats at Baseball Reference

Teams
- Atlanta Braves (2022–2023); Boston Red Sox (2024); Los Angeles Angels (2026–present)

Vaughn Anthony Grissom (born January 5, 2001) is an American professional baseball second baseman and shortstop for the Los Angeles Angels of Major League Baseball (MLB). He has previously played in MLB for the Atlanta Braves and Boston Red Sox. He made his MLB debut in 2022.

== Amateur career ==
Grissom attended Paul J. Hagerty High School in Oviedo, Florida, where he and Riley Greene were teammates on the baseball team. As a senior in 2019, he had a .389 batting average and a 0.82 earned run average. He was selected by the Atlanta Braves in the 11th round of the 2019 Major League Baseball draft and signed, forgoing his commitment to play college baseball at Florida International University.

== Professional career ==
=== Atlanta Braves ===
Grissom made his professional debut with the Rookie-level Gulf Coast League Braves, batting .288 with three home runs and 23 RBI over 44 games. He did not play in a game in 2020 due to the cancellation of the minor league season because of the COVID-19 pandemic. Grissom began the 2021 season with the Augusta GreenJackets of the Low-A East, and was promoted to the Rome Braves of the High-A East in September. Over 87 games between the two teams, he slashed .319/.418/.464 with seven home runs, 43 RBI, and 16 stolen bases. Grissom returned to Rome to begin the 2022 season. In mid-July, he was promoted to the Mississippi Braves of the Double-A Southern League. He recorded 91 at-bats in 22 games with Mississippi, hitting .363/.408/.516 prior to receiving a major league call-up.

On August 10, 2022, the Braves selected Grissom's contract and promoted him to the major leagues following an injury to Orlando Arcia. He made his MLB debut that night as Atlanta's starting second baseman at Fenway Park versus the Boston Red Sox, going 2-for-4 with a two-run home run over the Green Monster off of Darwinzon Hernández and a stolen base. At age 21 and seven months, Grissom became the youngest player in either the American League or National League history to homer and steal a base in his major league debut.

Following the departure of Dansby Swanson in free agency, Grissom entered the 2023 regular season with an opportunity to become the Braves' starting shortstop. Grissom battled with Arcia and Braden Shewmake for the starting shortstop job during spring training. On March 20, Grissom and Shewmake were optioned to the Triple-A Gwinnett Stripers in favor of Arcia. He would make only 23 appearances for Atlanta during the regular season, batting .280/.313/.347 with nine RBI.

=== Boston Red Sox ===
On December 30, 2023, the Braves traded Grissom to the Boston Red Sox in exchange for Chris Sale and cash considerations. During 2024 spring training, Grissom suffered a groin strain, delaying his availability for the start of the regular season. On May 3, he was activated from the injured list and made his Red Sox debut. On June 1, Grissom exited a game in the 2nd inning after grounding out and straining his hamstring. In 31 total appearances for Boston, he slashed .190/.246/.219 with six RBI and two stolen bases.

Grissom was optioned to the Triple-A Worcester Red Sox to begin the 2025 season, where he slashed .270/.342/.441 with 13 home runs, 48 RBI, and nine stolen bases. On August 20, 2025, Grissom was placed on the injured list due to right foot inflammation. He was transferred to the 60-day injured list on September 9 after being diagnosed with plantar fasciitis, officially ending his season.

=== Los Angeles Angels ===
On December 9, 2025, the Red Sox traded Grissom to the Los Angeles Angels in exchange for Isaiah Jackson. He began the 2026 season on the injured list with a left wrist sprain, and was activated on April 11. Grissom played in 119 games for the Angels and hit .242 with 13 home runs and 72 RBI.
