= 2024 Washington Nationals season =

2024 Washington Nationals
- League: National League
- Division: East
- Ballpark: Nationals Park
- City: Washington, D.C.
- Record: 71–91 (.438)
- Divisional place: 4th
- Owners: Lerner Enterprises
- General managers: Mike Rizzo
- Managers: Dave Martinez
- Television: MASN (Bob Carpenter, Dan Kolko, Kevin Frandsen, Ryan Zimmerman)
- Radio: 106.7 The Fan; Washington Nationals Radio Network (Charlie Slowes, Dave Jageler)

The 2024 Washington Nationals season was the Nationals' 20th season as the Major League Baseball franchise in the District of Columbia, the 17th season at Nationals Park, and the 56th since the original team was started in Montreal, Quebec, Canada. The Nationals were led by Dave Martinez in his seventh year as manager, the team posted the exact same record as their 2023 season, though finished 4th in their division instead of last place as the Marlins posted a 62-100 record.

On September 12, the Nationals were eliminated from playoff contention for the fifth consecutive season.

== Previous season ==
The Nationals finished fifth in the National League East Division in the 2023 season, with a win-loss record of 71–91.

== Offseason ==
The Nationals had only one pending major league free agent after the 2023 season: reliever Carl Edwards Jr., who had finished the season on the 60-day injured list. The Nationals also declined their 2024 club option for outfielder Víctor Robles, who had also ended the season on the 60-day injured list, while retaining his rights through arbitration.

Additionally, the Nationals designated reliever Matt Cronin for assignment to clear roster space entering the offseason.

The Nationals avoided arbitration with reliever Tanner Rainey and outfielder Víctor Robles by signing them to one-year deals on November 14, 2023. They tendered contracts to four more arbitration-eligible players—relievers Kyle Finnegan and Hunter Harvey, infielder Luis García Jr., and outfielder Lane Thomas—but chose not to retain their rights to first baseman Dominic Smith, who was not tendered a new contract.

Also losing their roster spots during the offseason: swingman pitchers Cory Abbott and Roddery Muñoz, the latter of whom was claimed off waivers by the Pittsburgh Pirates; relievers Joe La Sorsa and Andrés Machado, the latter of whom was released to pursue an overseas playing opportunity; infielder Jeter Downs, who was claimed off waivers by the New York Yankees; and catcher Israel Pineda.

The Nationals added four prospects, all pitchers—Zach Brzykcy, Cole Henry, DJ Herz, and Mitchell Parker—to the 40-man roster to prevent them from being eligible for the Rule 5 draft. In the Rule 5 draft, the Nationals made a selection themselves for the second straight year, adding infield prospect Nasim Nuñez of the Miami Marlins to their roster.

Active on the free agent market, the Nationals were linked in rumors to starting pitcher Michael Wacha; infielders Jeimer Candelario (ultimately signed with the Cincinnati Reds) and Rhys Hoskins; and outfielder Jorge Soler.

The Nationals announced signings of reliever Dylan Floro and third baseman Nick Senzel on December 12, 2023. The team later signed infielder/outfielder Joey Gallo on January 27, 2024.

=== Notable transactions ===
- November 6, 2023: The Nationals designated left-handed pitcher Matt Cronin for assignment.
- November 14, 2023: The Nationals selected the contracts of left-handed pitchers DJ Herz and Mitchell Parker and right-handed pitchers Zach Brzykcy and Cole Henry, designated right-handed pitcher Cory Abbott and first baseman Dominic Smith for assignment, and released right-handed pitcher Andrés Machado.
- December 1, 2023: The Nationals outrighted left-handed pitcher Joe La Sorsa to the minor leagues and lost right-handed pitcher Roddery Muñoz to the Pittsburgh Pirates on a waiver claim.
- December 6, 2023: The Nationals selected infielder Nasim Nuñez from the Miami Marlins in the Rule 5 draft and signed infielder/outfielder Juan Yepez to a minor league contract.
- December 12, 2023: The Nationals signed right-handed pitcher Dylan Floro and infielder Nick Senzel to one-year major league contracts and designated infielder Jeter Downs for assignment.
- December 13, 2023: The Nationals signed infielder Dérmis García to a minor league contract.
- December 18, 2023: The Nationals signed right-handed pitcher Ty Tice to a minor league contract.
- December 19, 2023: The Nationals signed right-handed pitcher Nash Walters to a minor league contract.
- December 21, 2023: The Nationals signed right-handed pitcher Spenser Watkins and first baseman Juan Yepez to minor league contracts.
- December 22, 2023: The Nationals signed infielder/outfielder Travis Blankenhorn to a minor league contract.
- January 5, 2024: The Nationals signed first baseman Lewin Díaz to a minor league contract.
- January 27, 2024: The Nationals signed infielder/outfielder Joey Gallo to a one-year major league contract with a mutual option for the 2025 season and designated catcher Israel Pineda for assignment.
- February 2, 2024: The Nationals signed left-handed pitcher Richard Bleier and right-handed pitchers Robert Gsellman and Adonis Medina to minor league contracts.
- February 6, 2024: The Nationals signed right-handed pitchers Luke Farrell and Stephen Nogosek to minor league contracts.
- February 8, 2024: The Nationals signed right-handed pitcher Luis Perdomo to a minor league contract.
- February 13, 2024: The Nationals signed outfielder Jesse Winker to a minor league contract.
- February 16, 2024: The Nationals signed right-handed pitcher Jacob Barnes to a minor league contract.
- February 17, 2024: The Nationals signed right-handed pitcher Zach Davies to a minor league contract.
- February 22, 2024: The Nationals signed right-handed pitcher Derek Law to a minor league contract.
- February 27, 2024: The Nationals signed right-handed pitcher Matt Barnes to a minor league contract.
- March 8, 2024: The Nationals signed outfielder Eddie Rosario to a minor league contract.
- March 13, 2024: The Nationals outrighted infielder Carter Kieboom to the minor leagues.
- March 24, 2024: The Nationals selected the contracts of right-handed pitcher Matt Barnes and outfielders Eddie Rosario and Jesse Winker.
- March 26, 2024: The Nationals selected the contract of right-handed pitcher Derek Law.

=== Spring training ===
The Nationals held their spring training at the Cacti Ballpark of the Palm Beaches in West Palm Beach, Florida. Non-roster invitees to spring training included left-handed pitchers Richard Bleier and Joe La Sorsa; right-handed pitchers Jacob Barnes, Matt Barnes, Zach Davies, Robert Gsellman, Derek Law, and Luis Perdomo; catchers Brady Lindsly and Israel Pineda; infielders Darren Baker, Lewin Díaz, Brady House, Trey Lipscomb, and Juan Yepez; and outfielders Travis Blankenhorn, Dylan Crews, Robert Hassell III, Eddie Rosario, Jesse Winker, and James Wood. The Nationals also signed outfielder Eddie Rosario to a minor league deal with an invitation to spring training midway through camp.

The Nationals had a 15–12–1 record in Grapefruit League play, before finishing their preseason exhibition slate with a March 26 game at Nationals Park between the major league team and a roster of prospects, including several non-roster invitees. They teed up their Opening Day roster as they selected the contracts of Law, Rosario, Winker, and Matt Barnes, with Lipscomb the last non-roster invitee to be reassigned to minor league camp following the Nationals Park exhibition.

== Regular season ==
=== Transactions ===
- March 30, 2024: The Nationals selected the contract of infielder Trey Lipscomb.
- April 6, 2024: Stephen Strasburg officially retired from baseball.
- April 23, 2024: The Nationals selected the contract of right-handed pitcher Jacob Barnes.
- May 7, 2024: The Nationals designated right-handed pitcher Matt Barnes for assignment; he elected free agency.
- May 27, 2024: The Nationals designated outfielder Víctor Robles for assignment.
- June 13, 2024: The Nationals claimed right-handed pitcher Eduardo Salazar off waivers from the Seattle Mariners.
- June 15, 2024: The Nationals signed first baseman/outfielder Harold Ramírez to a minor league contract.
- June 24, 2024: The Nationals selected the contract of first baseman/outfielder Harold Ramírez.
- July 1, 2024: The Nationals selected the contract of outfielder James Wood and designated outfielder Eddie Rosario for assignment; he was granted free agency.
- July 5, 2024: The Nationals selected the contract of first baseman/outfielder Juan Yepez.
- July 6, 2024: The Nationals designated infielder Nick Senzel for assignment.
- July 13, 2024: The Nationals acquired minor league infielder Cayden Wallace and a competitive balance pick in the 2024 draft from the Kansas City Royals for right-handed reliever Hunter Harvey.
- July 28, 2024: The Nationals acquired minor league pitcher Tyler Stuart from the New York Mets for outfielder Jesse Winker.
- July 29, 2024: The Nationals acquired infielder Josê Tena, minor league pitcher Alex Clemmey, and minor league infielder Rafael Ramírez Jr. from the Cleveland Guardians for outfielder Lane Thomas.
- July 30, 2024: The Nationals acquired minor league infielder Andrés Chaparro from the Arizona Diamondbacks for right-handed pitcher Dylan Floro and selected the contract of outfielder Travis Blankenhorn from the minor leagues.
- August 13, 2024: The Nationals selected the contracts of right-handed pitcher Orlando Ribalta and infielder Andrés Chaparro from the minor leagues and designated right-handed pitcher Jordan Weems and first baseman/outfielder Harold Ramírez for assignment.
- August 17, 2024: The Nationals selected the contract of left-handed pitcher Joe La Sorsa from the minor leagues.
- August 26, 2024: The Nationals selected the contract of outfielder Dylan Crews from the minor leagues.
- September 1, 2024: The Nationals selected the contract of infielder/outfielder Darren Baker from the minor leagues.

=== Major league debuts ===
- March 30, 2024: Trey Lipscomb, Nasim Nuñez
- April 15, 2024: Mitchell Parker
- June 4, 2024: DJ Herz
- July 1, 2024: James Wood
- August 13, 2024: Andrés Chaparro, Orlando Ribalta
- August 26, 2024: Dylan Crews
- September 1, 2024: Zach Brzykcy, Darren Baker

=== Season standings ===
==== National League East ====
NL East
Team	W	L	Pct.	GB	Home	Road
Philadelphia Phillies	95	67	.586	—	54‍–‍27	41‍–‍40
Atlanta Braves	89	73	.549	6	46‍–‍35	43‍–‍38
New York Mets	89	73	.549	6	46‍–‍35	43‍–‍38
Washington Nationals	71	91	.438	24	38‍–‍43	33‍–‍48
Miami Marlins	62	100	.383	33	30‍–‍51	32‍–‍49

==== National League Wild Card ====
Division leaders
Team	W	L	Pct.
Los Angeles Dodgers	98	64	.605
Philadelphia Phillies	95	67	.586
Milwaukee Brewers	93	69	.574

Wild Card teams (Top 3 teams qualify for postseason)
Team	W	L	Pct.	GB
San Diego Padres	93	69	.574	+4
Atlanta Braves	89	73	.549	—
New York Mets	89	73	.549	—
Arizona Diamondbacks	89	73	.549	—
St. Louis Cardinals	83	79	.512	6
Chicago Cubs	83	79	.512	6
San Francisco Giants	80	82	.494	9
Cincinnati Reds	77	85	.475	12
Pittsburgh Pirates	76	86	.469	13
Washington Nationals	71	91	.438	18
Miami Marlins	62	100	.383	27
Colorado Rockies	61	101	.377	28

==== Record vs. opponents ====
===== Record vs. National League =====
2024 National League record Source: MLB Standings Grid – 2024
Team	AZ	ATL	CHC	CIN	COL	LAD	MIA	MIL	NYM	PHI	PIT	SD	SF	STL	WSH	AL
Arizona	—	2–5	3–3	5–1	9–4	6–7	4–2	4–3	3–4	4–3	4–2	6–7	7–6	3–3	5–1	24–22
Atlanta	5–2	—	4–2	2–4	3–3	2–5	9–4	2–4	7–6	7–6	3–3	3–4	4–3	2–4	5–8	31–15
Chicago	3–3	2–4	—	5–8	4–2	4–2	4–3	5–8	3–4	2–4	7–6	2–4	3–4	6–7	6–1	27–19
Cincinnati	1–5	4–2	8–5	—	6–1	4–3	5–2	4–9	2–4	4–3	5–8	2–4	2–4	7–6	2–4	21–25
Colorado	4–9	3–3	2–4	1–6	—	3–10	2–5	4–3	2–4	2–4	2–4	8–5	3–10	3–4	2–4	20–26
Los Angeles	7–6	5–2	2–4	3–4	10–3	—	5–1	4–3	4–2	1–5	4–2	5–8	9–4	5–2	4–2	30–16
Miami	2–4	4–9	3–4	2–5	5–2	1–5	—	4–2	6–7	6–7	0–7	2–4	3–3	3–3	2–11	19–27
Milwaukee	3–4	4–2	8–5	9–4	3–4	3–4	2–4	—	5–1	2–4	7–6	2–5	4–2	8–5	2–4	31–15
New York	4–3	6–7	4–3	4–2	4–2	2–4	7–6	1–5	—	6–7	5–2	5–2	2–4	4–2	11–2	24–22
Philadelphia	3–4	6–7	4–2	3–4	4–2	5–1	7–6	4–2	7–6	—	3–4	5–1	5–2	4–2	9–4	26–20
Pittsburgh	2–4	3–3	6–7	8–5	4–2	2–4	7–0	6–7	2–5	4–3	—	0–6	2–4	5–8	4–3	20–26
San Diego	7–6	4–3	4–2	4–2	5–8	8–5	4–2	5–2	2–5	1–5	6–0	—	7–6	3–4	6–0	27–19
San Francisco	6–7	3–4	4–3	4–2	10–3	4–9	3–3	2–4	4–2	2–5	4–2	6–7	—	1–5	4–3	23–23
St. Louis	3–3	4–2	7–6	6–7	4–3	2–5	3–3	5–8	2–4	2–4	8–5	4–3	5–1	—	4–3	24–22
Washington	1–5	8–5	1–6	4–2	4–2	2–4	11–2	4–2	2–11	4–9	3–4	0–6	3–4	3–4	—	21–25

Updated with the results of all games through September 30, 2024.

===== Record vs. American League =====
2024 National League record vs. American League Source: MLB Standings
Team	BAL	BOS	CWS	CLE	DET	HOU	KC	LAA	MIN	NYY	OAK	SEA	TB	TEX	TOR
Arizona	1–2	3–0	2–1	3–0	1–2	1–2	2–1	2–1	1–2	1–2	2–1	1–2	0–3	2–2	2–1
Atlanta	1–2	3–1	1–2	2–1	3–0	3–0	2–1	2–1	3–0	2–1	2–1	1–2	2–1	2–1	2–1
Chicago	3–0	1–2	4–0	0–3	2–1	3–0	2–1	2–1	2–1	1–2	1–2	2–1	1–2	1–2	2–1
Cincinnati	0–3	1–2	3–0	1–3	0–3	3–0	0–3	3–0	2–1	3–0	1–2	0–3	1–2	1–2	2–1
Colorado	1–2	2–1	1–2	2–1	1–2	0–4	2–1	2–1	1–2	1–2	1–2	1–2	1–2	3–0	1–2
Los Angeles	2–1	3–0	3–0	2–1	1–2	1–2	2–1	2–2	2–1	2–1	2–1	3–0	2–1	1–2	2–1
Miami	2–1	0–3	2–1	1–2	2–1	0–3	1–2	0–3	2–1	1–2	1–2	2–1	1–3	1–2	3–0
Milwaukee	2–1	2–1	3–0	3–0	2–1	1–2	1–2	2–1	3–1	1–2	2–1	2–1	2–1	3–0	2–1
New York	2–1	3–0	3–0	0–3	1–2	1–2	2–1	1–2	2–1	4–0	1–2	0–3	0–3	2–1	2–1
Philadelphia	1–2	1–2	3–0	1–2	2–1	2–1	2–1	2–1	1–2	0–3	1–2	1–2	3–0	3–0	3–1
Pittsburgh	2–1	0–3	3–0	1–2	2–2	2–1	1–2	1–2	2–1	2–1	0–3	2–1	1–2	1–2	1–2
San Diego	2–1	2–1	3–0	2–1	2–1	2–1	2–1	0–3	2–1	1–2	3–0	1–3	2–1	2–1	1–2
San Francisco	2–1	1–2	2–1	1–2	2–1	2–1	3–0	1–2	2–1	0–3	2–2	1–2	1–2	2–1	1–2
St. Louis	3–0	2–1	1–2	2–1	1–2	1–2	1–3	2–1	2–1	2–1	2–1	1–2	2–1	2–1	0–3
Washington	2–2	1–2	1–2	1–2	2–1	2–1	0–3	2–1	1–2	2–1	1–2	2–1	1–2	1–2	2–1

Updated with the results of all games through September 30, 2024.

=== Game log ===
Legend
	Nationals win
	Nationals loss
	Postponement
	Eliminated from playoff race
**Bold**	Nationals team member

2024 game log: 71–91 (Home: 38–43; Away: 33–48)
March/April: 14–15 (Home: 4–8; Away: 10–7)

#	Date	Opponent	Score	Win	Loss	Save	Attendance	Record	Streak
1	March 28	@ Reds	2–8	Montas (1–0)	**Gray** (0–1)	—	44,030	0–1	L1
2	March 30	@ Reds	7–6	**Harvey** (1–0)	Díaz (0–1)	**Finnegan** (1)	39,674	1–1	W1
3	March 31	@ Reds	5–6	Sims (1–0)	**Finnegan** (0–1)	—	13,590	1–2	L1
4	April 1	Pirates	4–8	Contreras (1–0)	**Garcia** (0–1)	Chapman (1)	40,405	1–3	L2
5	April 3	Pirates	5–3	**Williams** (1–0)	Keller (0–1)	**Finnegan** (2)	14,022	2–3	W1
6	April 4	Pirates	4–7	Pérez (1–0)	**Gray** (0–2)	Bednar (1)	11,135	2–4	L1
7	April 5	Phillies	0–4	Nola (1–1)	**Corbin** (0–1)	—	21,374	2–5	L2
8	April 6	Phillies	2–5	Suárez (1–0)	**Irvin** (0–1)	Alvarado (2)	29,718	2–6	L3
9	April 7	Phillies	3–2	**Gore** (1–0)	Sánchez (0–1)	**Finnegan** (3)	24,765	3–6	W1
10	April 8	@ Giants	8–1	**Williams** (2–0)	Snell (0–1)	—	25,582	4–6	W2
11	April 9	@ Giants	5–3	**Weems** (1–0)	Walker (1–1)	**Finnegan** (4)	24,380	5–6	W3
12	April 10	@ Giants	1–7	Hicks (2–0)	**Corbin** (0–2)	—	25,558	5–7	L1
13	April 12	@ Athletics	1–2 (10)	Kelly (2–0)	**Finnegan** (0–2)	—	5,777	5–8	L2
14	April 13	@ Athletics	3–1	**Gore** (2–0)	Boyle (3–1)	**Finnegan** (5)	3,330	6–8	W1
15	April 14	@ Athletics	6–7	Spence (1–1)	**Law** (0–1)	Miller (3)	8,637	6–9	L1
16	April 15	@ Dodgers	6–4	**Parker** (1–0)	Glasnow (3–1)	**Finnegan** (6)	42,677	7–9	W1
17	April 16	@ Dodgers	2–6	Yarbrough (2–0)	**Corbin** (0–3)	—	52,718	7–10	L1
18	April 17	@ Dodgers	2–0	**Irvin** (1–1)	Knack (0–1)	**Finnegan** (7)	44,428	8–10	W1
19	April 19	Astros	3–5	Verlander (1–0)	**Gore** (2–1)	Hader (3)	22,999	8–11	L1
20	April 20	Astros	5–4 (10)	**Finnegan** (1–2)	Martinez (1–2)	—	34,608	9–11	W1
21	April 21	Astros	6–0	**Parker** (2–0)	Brown (0–4)	—	23,193	10–11	W2
22	April 23	Dodgers	1–4	Vesia (1–2)	**Harvey** (1–1)	Phillips (6)	27,806	10–12	L1
23	April 24	Dodgers	2–11	Knack (1–1)	**Irvin** (1–2)	—	26,298	10–13	L2
24	April 25	Dodgers	1–2	Yamamoto (2–1)	**Gore** (2–2)	Phillips (7)	24,185	10–14	L3
25	April 26	@ Marlins	3–1	**Law** (1–1)	Faucher (1–1)	**Finnegan** (8)	10,201	11–14	W1
26	April 27	@ Marlins	11–4	**Barnes** (1–0)	Cabrera (1–1)	—	12,695	12–14	W2
27	April 28	@ Marlins	12–9	**Law** (2–1)	Bender (0–2)	**Finnegan** (9)	15,894	13–14	W3
28	April 29	@ Marlins	7–2	**Irvin** (2–2)	Rogers (0–4)	—	6,376	14–14	W4
29	April 30	@ Rangers	1–7	Gray (1–1)	**Gore** (2–3)	—	27,584	14–15	L1

May: 12–15 (Home: 6–5; Away: 6–10)

#	Date	Opponent	Score	Win	Loss	Save	Attendance	Record	Streak
30	May 1	@ Rangers	1–0	**Williams** (3–0)	Heaney (0–4)	**Finnegan** (10)	24,846	15–15	W1
31	May 2	@ Rangers	0–6	Eovaldi (2–2)	**Parker** (2–1)	—	27,529	15–16	L1
32	May 3	Blue Jays	9–3	**Barnes** (2–0)	Swanson (0–2)	—	22,856	16–16	W1
33	May 4	Blue Jays	3–6	Gausman (2–3)	**Irvin** (2–3)	—	22,836	16–17	L1
34	May 5	Blue Jays	11–8	**Harvey** (2–1)	Cabrera (1–1)	**Finnegan** (11)	18,363	17–17	W1
35	May 7	Orioles	3–0	**Williams** (4–0)	Burnes (3–2)	**Finnegan** (12)	29,542	18–17	W2
36	May 8	Orioles	6–7 (12)	Suárez (2–0)	**Weems** (1–1)	Webb (2)	34,078	18–18	L1
37	May 10	@ Red Sox	5–1	**Corbin** (1–3)	Houck (3–4)	—	31,313	19–18	W1
38	May 11	@ Red Sox	2–4	Martin (2–1)	**Garcia** (0–2)	Jansen (6)	30,995	19–19	L1
39	May 12	@ Red Sox	2–3	Bello (4–1)	**Gore** (2–4)	Jansen (7)	29,250	19–20	L2
—	May 13	@ White Sox	Postponed (rain); Makeup: May 14						
40	May 14 (1)	@ White Sox	6–3	**Law** (3–1)	Brebbia (0–2)	**Finnegan** (13)	see 2nd game	20–20	W1
41	May 14 (2)	@ White Sox	0–4	Fedde (4–0)	**Parker** (2–2)	—	11,138	20–21	L1
42	May 15	@ White Sox	0–2	Crochet (4–4)	**Corbin** (1–4)	Kopech (5)	11,008	20–22	L2
43	May 17	@ Phillies	2–4	Wheeler (5–3)	**Irvin** (2–4)	Hoffman (3)	44,507	20–23	L3
44	May 18	@ Phillies	3–4 (10)	Soto (1–1)	**Finnegan** (1–3)	—	43,112	20–24	L4
45	May 19	@ Phillies	5–11	Nola (6–2)	**Barnes** (2–1)	—	44,713	20–25	L5
46	May 20	Twins	12–3	**Parker** (3–2)	López (4–3)	—	16,979	21–25	W1
47	May 21	Twins	0–10	Ryan (3–3)	**Corbin** (1–5)	—	23,597	21–26	L1
48	May 22	Twins	2–3	Okert (1–0)	**Irvin** (2–5)	Durán (4)	21,837	21–27	L2
49	May 24	Mariners	6–1	**Gore** (3–4)	Kirby (4–5)	—	23,789	22–27	W1
50	May 25	Mariners	3–1	**Floro** (1–0)	Speier (0–2)	**Finnegan** (14)	30,791	23–27	W2
51	May 26	Mariners	5–9	Voth (2–0)	**Floro** (1–1)	—	25,935	23–28	L1
52	May 27	@ Braves	8–4	**Parker** (4–2)	Morton (3–2)	—	38,858	24–28	W1
53	May 28	@ Braves	0–2	Fried (5–2)	**Barnes** (2–2)	Iglesias (13)	37,598	24–29	L1
54	May 29	@ Braves	7–2	**Gore** (4–4)	Schwellenbach (0–1)	—	33,654	25–29	W1
55	May 30	@ Braves	3–1	**Williams** (5–0)	Kerr (1–2)	**Finnegan** (15)	37,784	26–29	W2
56	May 31	@ Guardians	1–7	Bibee (4–1)	**Corbin** (1–6)	—	35,526	26–30	L1

June: 13–14 (Home: 7–6; Away: 6–8)

#	Date	Opponent	Score	Win	Loss	Save	Attendance	Record	Streak
57	June 1	@ Guardians	2–3	Lively (5–2)	**Parker** (4–3)	Clase (18)	36,725	26–31	L2
58	June 2	@ Guardians	5–2	**Irvin** (3–5)	Carrasco (2–5)	**Finnegan** (16)	25,521	27–31	W1
59	June 3	Mets	7–8	Megill (1–2)	**Gore** (4–5)	Diekman (2)	20,575	27–32	L1
60	June 4	Mets	3–6	Peterson (1–0)	**Herz** (0–1)	—	21,570	27–33	L2
61	June 5	Mets	1–9	Severino (4–2)	**Corbin** (1–7)	—	18,775	27–34	L3
62	June 6	Braves	2–5	Bummer (2–2)	**Harvey** (2–2)	Iglesias (16)	27,690	27–35	L4
63	June 7	Braves	2–1	**Irvin** (4–5)	Sale (8–2)	**Finnegan** (17)	39,175	28–35	W1
64	June 8	Braves	7–3	**Gore** (5–5)	Morton (3–3)	—	33,998	29–35	W2
65	June 9	Braves	8–5	**Barnes** (3–2)	Waldrep (0–1)	**Finnegan** (18)	34,282	30–35	W3
66	June 11	@ Tigers	5–4 (10)	**Finnegan** (2–3)	Chafin (3–2)	—	18,368	31–35	W4
67	June 12	@ Tigers	7–5	**Irvin** (5–5)	Olson (1–8)	**Finnegan** (19)	20,645	32–35	W5
68	June 13	@ Tigers	2–7	Miller (4–4)	**Law** (3–2)	—	21,925	32–36	L1
69	June 14	Marlins	8–1	**Gore** (6–5)	Anderson (0–1)	—	23,303	33–36	W1
70	June 15	Marlins	4–0	**Herz** (1–1)	Rogers (1–8)	—	25,637	34–36	W2
71	June 16	Marlins	3–1	**Parker** (5–3)	Luzardo (3–6)	**Finnegan** (20)	27,003	35–36	W3
72	June 18	Diamondbacks	0–5	Cecconi (2–5)	**Irvin** (5–6)	—	28,230	35–37	L1
73	June 19	Diamondbacks	3–1	**Law** (4–2)	Pfaadt (3–6)	**Finnegan** (21)	20,853	36–37	W1
74	June 20	Diamondbacks	2–5	Nelson (5–5)	**Gore** (6–6)	Sewald (8)	21,158	36–38	L1
75	June 21	@ Rockies	11–5	**Floro** (2–1)	Hudson (2–10)	—	31,935	37–38	W1
76	June 22	@ Rockies	7–8	Beeks (4–3)	**Finnegan** (2–4)	—	34,509	37–39	L1
77	June 23	@ Rockies	2–1	**Floro** (3–1)	Beeks (4–4)	**Finnegan** (22)	30,407	38–39	W1
78	June 24	@ Padres	6–7 (10)	Peralta (2–1)	**Harvey** (2–3)	—	39,164	38–40	L1
79	June 25	@ Padres	7–9	Mazur (1–2)	**Gore** (6–7)	Suárez (20)	40,825	38–41	L2
80	June 26	@ Padres	5–8	Cease (7–6)	**Herz** (1–2)	—	37,397	38–42	L3
81	June 28	@ Rays	1–3	Eflin (4–5)	**Parker** (5–4)	Fairbanks (13)	14,959	38–43	L4
82	June 29	@ Rays	8–1	**Irvin** (6–6)	Civale (2–6)	—	17,501	39–43	W1
83	June 30	@ Rays	0–5	Bradley (3–4)	**Corbin** (1–8)	—	18,259	39–44	L1

July: 10–16 (Home: 6–8; Away: 4–8)

#	Date	Opponent	Score	Win	Loss	Save	Attendance	Record	Streak
84	July 1	Mets	7–9 (11)	Diekman (2–2)	**Harvey** (2–4)	Garrett (4)	26,719	39–45	L2
85	July 2	Mets	2–7 (10)	Buttó (2–3)	**Garcia** (0–3)	—	19,844	39–46	L3
86	July 3	Mets	7–5	**Barnes** (4–2)	Diekman (2–3)	**Finnegan** (23)	32,391	40–46	W1
87	July 4	Mets	1–0	**Irvin** (7–6)	Houser (1–5)	**Law** (1)	34,394	41–46	W2
88	July 5	Cardinals	6–7 (11)	Helsley (3–3)	**Floro** (3–2)	—	24,072	41–47	L1
89	July 6	Cardinals	14–6	**Barnes** (5–2)	Lynn (4–4)	—	21,838	42–47	W1
90	July 7	Cardinals	3–8	Gibson (7–3)	**Herz** (1–3)	—	19,782	42–48	L1
91	July 8	Cardinals	0–6	Mikolas (7–7)	**Parker** (5–5)	—	16,454	42–49	L2
92	July 9	@ Mets	5–7	Quintana (4–5)	**Irvin** (7–7)	Díaz (9)	31,243	42–50	L3
93	July 10	@ Mets	2–6	Severino (6–3)	**Corbin** (1–9)	Buttó (1)	24,887	42–51	L4
94	July 11	@ Mets	0–7	Peterson (4–0)	**Gore** (6–8)	—	25,710	42–52	L5
95	July 12	@ Brewers	5–2	**Garcia** (1–3)	Peralta (6–5)	**Finnegan** (24)	31,967	43–52	W1
96	July 13	@ Brewers	6–5	**Law** (5–2)	Megill (0–2)	**Finnegan** (25)	34,169	44–52	W2
97	July 14	@ Brewers	3–9	Rea (9–3)	**Irvin** (7–8)	—	35,040	44–53	L1
**All–Star Break (July 15–18)**
98	July 19	Reds	8–5	**Corbin** (2–9)	Montas (4–8)	**Finnegan** (26)	38,402	45–53	W1
99	July 20	Reds	5–4	**Law** (6–2)	Wilson (1–2)	**Finnegan** (27)	32,734	46–53	W2
100	July 21	Reds	5–2	**Garcia** (2–3)	Sims (1–4)	**Finnegan** (28)	23,967	47–53	W3
101	July 23	Padres	0–4	Vásquez (3–5)	**Herz** (1–4)	—	20,749	47–54	L1
102	July 24	Padres	3–12	Waldron (6–9)	**Parker** (5–6)	—	23,323	47–55	L2
103	July 25	Padres	0–3	Cease (10–8)	**Corbin** (2–10)	—	20,755	47–56	L3
104	July 26	@ Cardinals	10–8 (10)	**Barnes** (6–2)	Fernandez (1–3)	—	41,382	48–56	W1
105	July 27	@ Cardinals	14–3	**Irvin** (8–8)	Gibson (7–4)	—	39,372	49–56	W2
106	July 28	@ Cardinals	3–4	Helsley (4–3)	**Floro** (3–3)	—	37,639	49–57	L1
107	July 29	@ Diamondbacks	8–9	Mantiply (5–2)	**Finnegan** (2–5)	—	18,790	49–58	L2
108	July 30	@ Diamondbacks	0–17	Nelson (8–6)	**Corbin** (2–11)	—	19,758	49–59	L3
109	July 31	@ Diamondbacks	4–5	Gallen (9–5)	**Gore** (6–9)	Thompson (1)	18,294	49–60	L4

August: 12–15 (Home: 9–9; Away: 3–6)

#	Date	Opponent	Score	Win	Loss	Save	Attendance	Record	Streak
110	August 2	Brewers	3–8	Montas (5–8)	**Irvin** (8–9)	—	22,132	49–61	L5
111	August 3	Brewers	6–4	**Herz** (2–4)	Civale (2–8)	**Finnegan** (29)	30,577	50–61	W1
112	August 4	Brewers	4–3	**Parker** (6–6)	Myers (6–5)	**Finnegan** (30)	18,748	51–61	W2
113	August 5	Giants	1–4	Webb (9–8)	**Corbin** (2–12)	Doval (21)	14,674	51–62	L1
114	August 6	Giants	11–5	**Gore** (7–9)	Birdsong (3–1)	—	17,044	52–62	W1
115	August 7	Giants	4–7	Snell (2–3)	**Irvin** (8–10)	Doval (22)	13,310	52–63	L1
116	August 8	Giants	5–9 (10)	Doval (4–1)	**Garcia** (2–4)	—	12,423	52–64	L2
117	August 9	Angels	3–2 (10)	**Finnegan** (3–5)	Moore (5–3)	—	22,333	53–64	W1
118	August 10	Angels	5–4 (10)	**Law** (7–2)	Contreras (2–2)	—	22,183	54–64	W2
119	August 11	Angels	4–6	Kochanowicz (1–2)	**Gore** (7–10)	—	25,456	54–65	L1
120	August 13	@ Orioles	9–3	**Irvin** (9–10)	Rogers (2–11)	—	28,058	55–65	W1
121	August 14	@ Orioles	1–4	Kremer (5–9)	**Herz** (2–5)	Domínguez (3)	26,479	55–66	L1
122	August 15	@ Phillies	3–13	Wheeler (12–5)	**Parker** (6–7)	—	43,722	55–67	L2
123	August 16	@ Phillies	2–3	Estévez (2–4)	**Finnegan** (3–6)	—	41,067	55–68	L3
124	August 17	@ Phillies	1–5	Sánchez (9–8)	**Gore** (7–11)	—	43,356	55–69	L4
125	August 18	@ Phillies	6–4	**Barnes** (7–2)	Strahm (4–2)	**Finnegan** (31)	40,677	56–69	W1
126	August 20	Rockies	1–3	Gomber (4–8)	**Herz** (2–6)	Chivilli (1)	16,433	56–70	L1
127	August 21	Rockies	6–1	**Parker** (7–7)	Gordon (0–5)	—	18,847	57–70	W1
128	August 22	Rockies	8–3	**Corbin** (3–12)	Quantrill (8–9)	—	18,349	58–70	W2
129	August 23	@ Braves	2–3 (10)	Iglesias (3–1)	**Salazar** (0–1)	—	37,203	58–71	L1
130	August 24	@ Braves	2–4	Bummer (4–2)	**Garcia** (2–5)	Johnson (2)	40,230	58–72	L2
131	August 25	@ Braves	5–1	**Barnes** (8–2)	Jackson (4–3)	**Finnegan** (32)	32,327	59–72	W1
132	August 26	Yankees	2–5	Cortés Jr. (8–10)	**Parker** (7–8)	Holmes (28)	32,812	59–73	L1
133	August 27	Yankees	4–2	**Corbin** (4–12)	Cole (5–3)	**Finnegan** (33)	34,334	60–73	W1
134	August 28	Yankees	5–2	**Gore** (8–11)	Rodón (14–9)	**Finnegan** (34)	30,190	61–73	W2
135	August 30	Cubs	6–7	Imanaga (11–3)	**Irvin** (9–11)	Thompson (2)	28,792	61–74	L1
136	August 31	Cubs	3–5	Assad (7–4)	**Herz** (2–7)	Hodge (3)	32,995	61–75	L2

September: 10–16 (Home: 6–7; Away: 4–9)

#	Date	Opponent	Score	Win	Loss	Save	Attendance	Record	Streak
137	September 1	Cubs	1–14	Wicks (2–2)	**Parker** (7–9)	—	31,086	61–76	L3
138	September 3	@ Marlins	6–2	**Corbin** (5–12)	Meyer (3–5)	—	6,854	62–76	W1
139	September 4	@ Marlins	3–4 (10)	McMillon (1–1)	**Law** (7–3)	—	6,156	62–77	L1
140	September 5	@ Pirates	4–9	Falter (7–7)	**Irvin** (9–12)	Chapman (6)	10,155	62–78	L2
—	September 6	@ Pirates	Postponed (rain); Makeup: September 7						
141	September 7 (1)	@ Pirates	5–3	**Herz** (3–7)	Ortiz (6–5)	**Finnegan** (35)	13,687	63–78	W1
142	September 7 (2)	@ Pirates	8–6	**Garcia** (3–5)	Chapman (5–5)	**Finnegan** (36)	18,937	64–78	W2
143	September 8	@ Pirates	3–7	Jones (6–7)	**Corbin** (5–13)	—	12,369	64–79	L1
144	September 10	Braves	0–12	Chavez (2–2)	**Gore** (8–12)	—	17,668	64–80	L2
145	September 11	Braves	5–1	**Irvin** (10–13)	Fried (9–9)	—	15,585	65–80	W1
146	September 12	Marlins	3–6	Bender (5–2)	**Law** (7–4)	Tinoco (1)	13,299	65–81	L1
147	September 13	Marlins	4–1	**Herz** (4–7)	Cabrera (4–7)	**Finnegan** (37)	20,584	66–81	W1
148	September 14	Marlins	4–1	**Corbin** (6–13)	Bellozo (2–4)	**Finnegan** (38)	28,175	67–81	W2
149	September 15	Marlins	4–3	**Gore** (9–12)	Oller (1–4)	**Ferrer** (1)	18,265	68–81	W3
150	September 16	@ Mets	1–2 (10)	Garrett (8–5)	**Barnes** (8–3)	—	21,694	68–82	L1
151	September 17	@ Mets	1–10	Megill (4–5)	**Parker** (7–10)	—	24,932	68–83	L2
152	September 18	@ Mets	0–10	Quintana (10–9)	**Herz** (4–8)	—	34,196	68–84	L3
153	September 19	@ Cubs	6–7	Roberts (1–0)	**Garcia** (3–6)	Hodge (6)	31,479	68–85	L4
154	September 20	@ Cubs	1–3	Taillon (11–8)	**Williams** (5–1)	Hodge (7)	29,590	68–86	L5
155	September 21	@ Cubs	5–1	**Gore** (10–12)	Hendricks (4–12)	—	38,819	69–86	W1
156	September 22	@ Cubs	0–5	Imanaga (15–3)	**Irvin** (10–13)	—	30,086	69–87	L1
157	September 24	Royals	0–1 (10)	Zerpa (2–0)	**Finnegan** (3–7)	Erceg (12)	14,477	69–88	L2
158	September 25	Royals	0–3	Lynch IV (2–0)	**Herz** (4–9)	Erceg (13)	16,670	69–89	L3
159	September 26	Royals	4–7	Bubic (1–1)	**Finnegan** (3–8)	Erceg (14)	14,357	69–90	L4
160	September 27	Phillies	9–1	**Williams** (6–1)	Suárez (12–8)	—	31,796	70–90	W1
161	September 28	Phillies	6–3	**Ferrer** (1–0)	Hoffman (3–3)	—	38,135	71–90	W2
162	September 29	Phillies	3–6	Nola (14–8)	**Irvin** (10–14)	Ruiz (1)	26,729	71–91	L1

== Roster ==
2024 Washington Nationals
Roster
Pitchers: 60 Joan Adon; 59 Jacob Barnes; 41 Matt Barnes; 66 Zach Brzykcy; 46 Patrick Corbin; 47 José A. Ferrer; 67 Kyle Finnegan; 44 Dylan Floro; 61 Robert Garcia; 1 MacKenzie Gore; 40 Josiah Gray; 73 Hunter Harvey; 74 DJ Herz; 27 Jake Irvin; 53 Joe La Sorsa; 58 Derek Law; 70 Mitchell Parker; 21 Tanner Rainey; 64 Orlando Ribalta; 79 Jackson Rutledge; 62 Eduardo Salazar; 51 Jordan Weems; 32 Trevor Williams; 54 Amos Willingham	Catchers: 15 Riley Adams; 81 Drew Millas; 20 Keibert Ruiz; Infielders: 5 CJ Abrams; 10 Darren Baker; 19 Andrés Chaparro; 24 Joey Gallo; 2 Luis García Jr.; 21,38 Trey Lipscomb; 45 Joey Meneses; 26 Nasim Nuñez; 13 Nick Senzel; 8 José Tena; 14 Ildemaro Vargas; 18 Juan Yepez	Outfielders: 33 Travis Blankenhorn; 17 Alex Call; 3 Dylan Crews; 16 Víctor Robles; 8 Eddie Rosario; 28 Lane Thomas; 6 Jesse Winker; 29,50 James Wood; 30 Jacob Young; Other batters: 36 Stone Garrett; 43 Harold Ramírez	Manager: 4 Dave Martinez; Coaches: 35 Henry Blanco (coaching/strategy); 25 Ricky Bones (bullpen); 22 Miguel Cairo (bench); 7 Darnell Coles (hitting); 63 Sean Doolittle (pitching strategist); 12 Ricky Gutiérrez (third base); 48 Jim Hickey (pitching); 23 Chris Johnson (assistant hitting); 87 Octavio Martinez (field staff coordinator); 88 Gerardo Parra (first base); 89 Drew Rossi (bullpen catcher)

== Player stats ==
= Indicates team leader

= Indicates league leader

=== Batting ===
Note: G = Games played; AB = At bats; R = Runs scored; H = Hits; 2B = Doubles; 3B = Triples; HR = Home runs; RBI = Runs batted in; SB = Stolen bases; BB = Walks; AVG = Batting average; SLG = Slugging average

Player	G	AB	R	H	2B	3B	HR	RBI	SB	BB	AVG	SLG
CJ Abrams	138	541	79	133	29	6	20	65	31	40	.246	.433
Luis García Jr.	140	500	58	141	25	1	18	70	22	27	.282	.444
Jacob Young	150	468	75	120	24	1	3	36	33	30	.256	.331
Keibert Ruiz	127	459	46	105	21	0	13	57	3	16	.229	.359
Jesse Winker	101	315	51	81	18	0	11	45	14	53	.257	.419
Lane Thomas	77	300	42	76	16	3	8	40	28	32	.253	.407
James Wood	79	295	43	78	13	4	9	41	14	39	.264	.427
Joey Meneses	76	281	19	65	11	0	3	42	2	21	.231	.302
Ildemaro Vargas	95	272	21	67	16	0	1	30	9	19	.246	.316
Juan Yepez	62	226	32	64	15	0	6	26	2	18	.283	.429
Joey Gallo	76	223	24	36	9	0	10	27	3	32	.161	.336
Eddie Rosario	67	219	26	40	11	0	7	26	8	13	.183	.329
Nick Senzel	64	206	25	43	10	0	7	18	1	27	.209	.359
Trey Lipscomb	61	190	20	38	3	0	1	10	11	16	.200	232
José Tena	41	157	14	43	5	0	3	15	6	7	.274	.363
Andrés Chaparro	33	121	12	26	12	0	4	15	1	7	.215	.413
Dylan Crews	31	119	12	26	5	1	3	8	12	11	.218	.353
Riley Adams	41	116	10	26	5	1	2	8	1	10	.224	.336
Alex Call	30	99	15	34	9	0	3	14	5	12	.343	.525
Harold Ramírez	25	74	7	18	4	1	1	16	1	2	.243	.365
Nasim Nuñez	51	61	14	15	1	0	0	1	8	12	.246	.262
Drew Millas	20	57	7	14	1	0	1	1	4	5	.243	.316
Travis Blankenhorn	13	31	2	4	1	0	0	5	0	1	.129	.161
Victor Robles	14	25	3	3	0	0	0	2	4	5	.120	.120
Darren Baker	9	14	1	7	2	0	0	0	0	0	.500	.643
Stone Garrett	2	5	2	3	1	0	1	3	0	1	.600	1.400
Team totals	162	5374	660	1306	267	18	135	621	223	456	.243	.375

Source:Baseball Reference

=== Pitching ===
Note: W = Wins; L = Losses; ERA = Earned run average; G = Games pitched; GS = Games started; SV = Saves; IP = Innings pitched; H = Hits allowed; R = Runs allowed; ER = Earned runs allowed; BB = Walks allowed; SO = Strikeouts

Player	W	L	ERA	G	GS	SV	IP	H	R	ER	BB	SO
Jake Irvin	10	14	4.41	33	33	0	187.2	173	97	92	52	156
Patrick Corbin	6	13	5.62	32	32	0	174.2	208	114	109	54	139
MacKenzie Gore	10	12	3.90	32	32	0	166.1	171	93	72	65	181
Mitchell Parker	7	10	4.29	29	29	0	151.0	154	82	72	43	133
Derek Law	7	4	2.60	75	0	1	90.0	82	31	26	24	76
DJ Herz	4	9	4.16	19	19	0	88.2	76	45	41	36	106
Trevor Williams	6	1	2.03	13	13	0	66.2	51	17	15	18	59
Jacob Barnes	8	3	4.36	63	0	0	66.0	67	36	32	20	55
Kyle Finnegan	3	8	3.68	65	0	38	63.2	61	31	26	24	60
Robert Garcia	3	6	4.22	72	0	0	59.2	55	34	28	16	75
Dylan Floro	3	3	2.06	51	0	0	52.1	42	14	12	13	40
Tanner Rainey	0	0	4.76	50	0	0	51.0	47	28	27	29	44
Hunter Harvey	2	4	4.20	43	0	0	45.0	43	24	21	12	50
Jordan Weems	1	1	6.70	41	0	0	41.2	49	35	31	24	35
José A. Ferrer	1	0	3.38	31	0	1	32.0	27	12	12	6	25
Eduardo Salazar	0	1	2.96	25	0	0	27.1	31	10	9	12	24
Joe La Sorsa	0	0	4.58	16	0	0	17.2	17	9	9	5	14
Matt Barnes	0	0	6.75	14	0	0	13.1	16	11	10	4	10
Joan Adon	0	0	6.75	8	1	0	10.2	12	8	8	4	6
Jackson Rutledge	0	0	3.24	3	1	0	8.1	8	3	3	2	9
Josiah Gray	0	2	14.04	2	2	0	8.1	15	13	13	5	9
Zach Brzykcy	0	0	14.29	6	0	0	5.2	9	9	9	3	4
Orlando Ribalta	0	0	13.50	4	0	0	3.1	10	5	5	2	3
Ildemaro Vargas	0	0	4.50	2	0	0	2.0	3	1	1	0	0
Amos Willingham	0	0	18.00	1	0	0	1.0	2	2	2	0	1
Team totals	71	91	4.30	162	162	40	1434.0	1429	764	685	473	1314

Source:Baseball Reference

== Farm system ==
Level	Team	League	Manager
Triple-A	Rochester Red Wings	International League	
Double-A	Harrisburg Senators	Eastern League	
High-A	Wilmington Blue Rocks	South Atlantic League	
Low-A	Fredericksburg Nationals	Carolina League	
Rookie	FCL Nationals	Florida Complex League	
Rookie	DSL Nationals	Dominican Summer League	
