= Zach Neal =

American baseball player (born 1988)

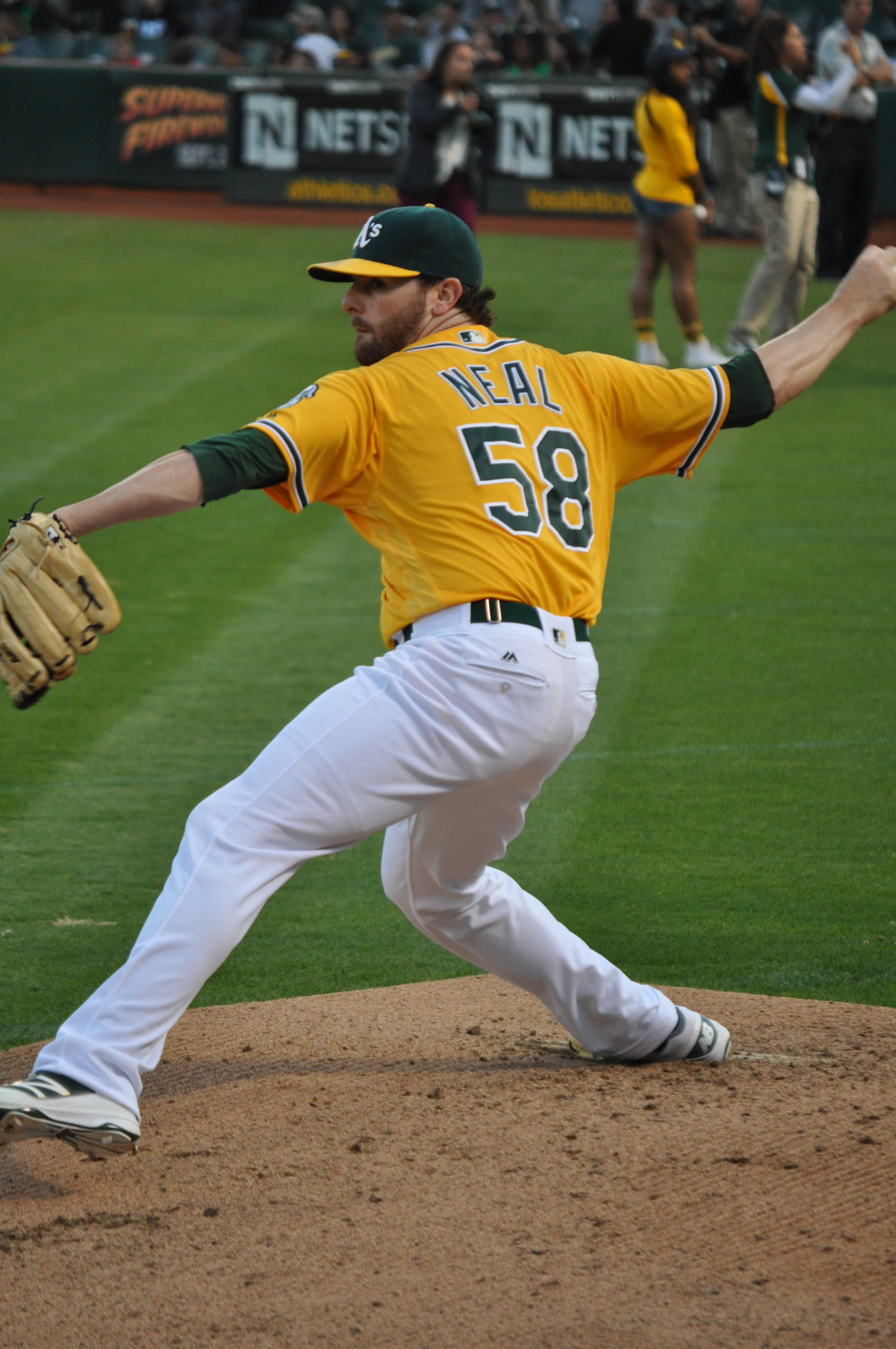
- Neal warms up on September 6, 2016
- Pitcher
- Born: November 9, 1988 (age 37); Columbia, South Carolina, U.S.
- Batted: Right Threw: Right

Professional debut
- MLB: May 11, 2016, for the Oakland Athletics
- NPB: April 2, 2019, for the Saitama Seibu Lions

Last appearance
- NPB: September 8, 2021, for the Saitama Seibu Lions
- MLB: October 1, 2023, for the Oakland Athletics

MLB statistics
- Win–loss record: 3–5
- Earned run average: 5.35
- Strikeouts: 62

NPB statistics
- Win–loss record: 19–15
- Earned run average: 4.49
- Strikeouts: 143
- Stats at Baseball Reference

Teams
- Oakland Athletics (2016–2017); Los Angeles Dodgers (2018); Saitama Seibu Lions (2019–2021); Oakland Athletics (2023)

Zachary Sheridan Neal (born November 9, 1988) is an American former professional baseball pitcher. He played in Major League Baseball (MLB) for the Oakland Athletics and Los Angeles Dodgers, and in Nippon Professional Baseball (NPB) for the Saitama Seibu Lions.

== Career ==
=== Amateur career ===
Neal attended Flower Mound High School in Flower Mound, Texas. He played college baseball at Sam Houston State University, Howard College, and the University of Oklahoma.

=== Florida / Miami Marlins ===
The Florida Marlins selected Neal in the 17th round of the 2010 Major League Baseball draft. He made his professional debut with the GCL Marlins and also played for the Low-A Jamestown Jammers, accumulating a 2–1 record and 1.44 ERA in 7 games. In 2011, Neal played for the Single-A Greensboro Grasshoppers, posting a 7–6 record and 4.16 ERA in 22 appearances. The next year, he split the season between the High-A Jupiter Hammerheads and the Double-A Jacksonville Suns, pitching to a cumulative 8–7 record and 2.78 ERA with 78 strikeouts in 30 games.

=== Oakland Athletics ===
On March 31, 2013, Neal signed a minor league contract with the Oakland Athletics. He was assigned to the Double-A Midland RockHounds, where he spent the season, registering an 8–12 record and 4.35 ERA with 96 strikeouts in 165.2 innings of work. In 2014, Neal split the season between the High-A Stockton Ports, Midland, and the Triple-A Sacramento River Cats, logging a 10–7 record and 3.09 ERA in 27 appearances between the three teams. In 2015, Neal split the year between the Triple-A Nashville Sounds and Midland, pitching to a 10–13 record and 4.67 ERA with 100 strikeouts in 167.2 innings pitched.

Neal was called up to the majors for the first time on May 11, 2016. Neal was a solid contributor for Oakland, appearing in 24 games with 6 spot starts. He finished with a 2–4 record and 2 saves. However, he had a low strikeout rate, striking out only 9.6 percent of batters faced.

On January 18, 2017, he was designated for assignment by Oakland after the team signed Trevor Plouffe. Neal cleared waivers and was assigned to Nashville. He began the 2017 season in Triple-A, but was called up to the Athletics on May 24. He was twice optioned back to Nashville and recalled during the season before being designated for assignment on August 16. He was outrighted to Nashville on August 18. On the year, he recorded a 7.98 ERA in 6 appearances. He elected to become a free agent after the season.

=== Los Angeles Dodgers ===
On January 6, 2018, Neal signed a minor league contract with the Los Angeles Dodgers that included an invitation to spring training. He was added to the Dodgers major league roster on April 3. After pitching one inning for the Dodgers, in which he allowed a home run to John Ryan Murphy, Neal was designated for assignment on April 5.

=== Cincinnati Reds ===
On April 17, 2018, the Dodgers traded Neal and Ibandel Isabel to the Cincinnati Reds for Ariel Hernández. Neal was assigned to the Louisville Bats. Neal pitched to a 2–2 record and 5.90 ERA with 23 strikeouts in 39.2 innings of work.

=== Los Angeles Dodgers (second stint) ===
On July 4, 2018, Neal was traded back to the Dodgers organization along with Dylan Floro and international bonus pool space for minor league pitchers James Marinan and Aneurys Zabala. He pitched in 14 games for the Triple-A Oklahoma City Dodgers, starting 11 of them, and finished with a 3–2 record and 4.40 ERA. Neal elected free agency on October 11.

=== Saitama Seibu Lions ===
Neal signed with the Saitama Seibu Lions of Nippon Professional Baseball for the 2019 season. He finished his first NPB season with a 12–1 record and 2.87 ERA with 51 strikeouts in 100.1 innings of work. In 2020, Neal pitched to a 6–8 record and 5.22 ERA in 21 games. In 2021, Neal made 11 appearances, going 1–6 with a 5.85 ERA and 26 strikeouts. He became a free agent following the season.

=== Colorado Rockies ===
On February 18, 2022, Neal signed a minor league contract with the Colorado Rockies. Neal pitched in 29 games (starting 21) for the Triple-A Albuquerque Isotopes, logging a 6–6 record and 6.87 ERA with 95 strikeouts in 116 2/3 innings. He elected free agency following the season on November 10.

=== Oakland Athletics (second stint) ===
On April 7, 2023, Neal signed a minor league contract with the Oakland Athletics. He made 3 appearances (2 starts) for the Triple-A Las Vegas Aviators, posting a 5.56 ERA with 11 strikeouts in 11 1/3 innings pitched. On May 11, Neal was selected to the active roster to make a spot start against the Texas Rangers. Neal pitched in 2 games for Oakland, giving up 3 runs on 4 hits with 3 strikeouts in 3 1/3 innings pitched. Neal was designated for assignment on May 19, following the promotion of Lucas Erceg. He cleared waivers and was sent outright to Triple-A on May 20. On August 3, Neal returned to the major league roster. In 14 total appearances for Oakland, he struggled to a 6.67 ERA with 25 strikeouts in 27 innings. On October 4, Neal was removed from the 40-man roster and sent outright to Triple-A Las Vegas. On October 6, Neal elected free agency.

=== Retirement ===
Neal announced his retirement after the 2023 season.

== Personal life ==
Neal is married to Kianna Neal, née Witt, sister of Kansas City Royals shortstop Bobby Witt Jr. Neal and his wife met when he was pitching for the University of Oklahoma, where she was a cheerleader. Neal is a father.
