= Aneurys Zabala =

Dominican baseball player (born 1996)

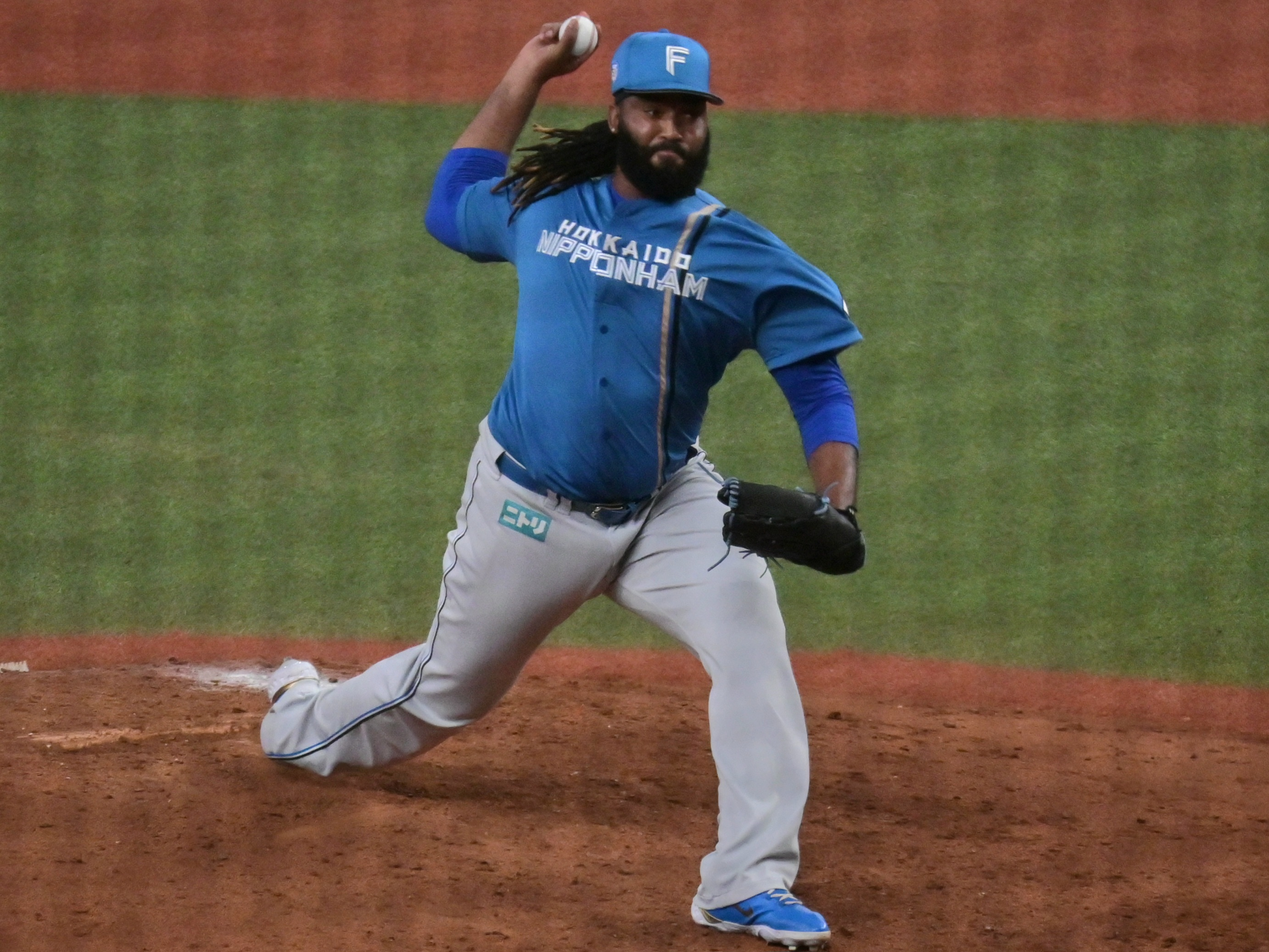
- Zabala with the Hokkaido Nippon-Ham Fighters

Leones del Escogido – No. 79
- Pitcher
- Born: December 21, 1996 (age 29); Santo Domingo, Dominican Republic
- Bats: Right Throws: Right

Professional debut
- MLB: June 12, 2022, for the Miami Marlins
- NPB: May 30, 2024, for the Hokkaido Nippon-Ham Fighters

MLB statistics (through 2022 season)
- Win–loss record: 0–0
- Earned run average: 0.00
- Strikeouts: 2

NPB statistics (through 2025 season)
- Win–loss record: 0–0
- Earned run average: 1.56
- Strikeouts: 17
- Stats at Baseball Reference

Teams
- Miami Marlins (2022); Hokkaido Nippon-Ham Fighters (2024–2025)

Aneurys Zabala (born December 21, 1996) is a Dominican professional baseball pitcher for the Toros de Tijuana of the Mexican League. He has previously played in Major League Baseball (MLB) for the Miami Marlins, and in Nippon Professional Baseball (NPB) for the Hokkaido Nippon-Ham Fighters.

== Career ==
=== Seattle Mariners ===
Zabala was signed by the Seattle Mariners as an international free agent on April 30, 2014. He made his professional debut with the Dominican Summer League Mariners, recording a 1–6 record and 4.33 ERA in 14 games (12 of them starts). The following year, Zabala made 14 appearances for the Arizona League Mariners, struggling to a 2–2 record and 6.56 ERA with 21 strikeouts in 23 1/3 innings pitched. In 2016, Zabala made 16 appearances for the AZL Mariners, improving his ERA to 2.88 while striking out 28 in 25 innings pitched.

=== Los Angeles Dodgers ===
On March 1, 2017, Zabala and Drew Jackson were traded to the Los Angeles Dodgers in exchange for Chase De Jong. Zabala spent the year split between the Arizona League Dodgers, and the Single-A Great Lakes Loons, accumulating a 4–2 record and 7.66 ERA with 25 strikeouts in 24 2/3 innings pitched.

He was assigned to Great Lakes to begin the 2018 season. In 24 games, he pitched to a 2–2 record and 4.86 ERA with 30 strikeouts in 37 innings of work.

=== Cincinnati Reds ===
On July 4, 2018, Zabala and James Marinan were traded to the Cincinnati Reds in exchange for Dylan Floro, Zach Neal, and international bonus pool money. He finished the year with the Single-A Dayton Dragons, posting an 0–3 record and 3.31 ERA with 3 saves and 13 strikeouts in 16 1/3 innings pitched.

In 2019, Zabala spent the year with the High–A Daytona Tortugas. Appearing in 39 contests, he recorded a 1–2 record and 5.63 ERA with 48 strikeouts in 54 1/3 innings pitched. Zabala did not play in a game in 2020 due to the cancellation of the minor league season because of the COVID-19 pandemic. He became a free agent on November 2, 2020.

=== Philadelphia Phillies ===
On December 31, 2020, Zabala signed a minor league contract with the Philadelphia Phillies organization. He was assigned to the High-A Jersey Shore BlueClaws to begin the 2021 season. He made 33 total appearances split between Jersey Shore and the Double-A Reading Fightin Phils, pitching to a cumulative 3–5 record and 6.75 ERA with 63 strikeouts in 42 2/3 innings pitched. Zabala elected free agency following the season on November 7, 2021.

=== Miami Marlins ===
On December 1, 2021, Zabala signed a minor league contract with the Miami Marlins organization. He was assigned to the Double–A Pensacola Blue Wahoos to begin the 2022 season.

On June 11, 2022, Zabala was selected to the 40-man roster and promoted to the major leagues for the first time. He made his debut on June 12, against the Houston Astros. Zabala pitched 1/3 of an inning, with a hit and a strikeout. He was designated for assignment on June 13. Zabala cleared waivers and was sent outright to Double–A Pensacola on June 16. Zabala had his contract selected on August 1, and was designated for assignment on August 6. On August 8, Zabala cleared waivers and was sent outright to the Triple–A Jacksonville Jumbo Shrimp. He had his contract selected again on September 12, as the 29th man for a doubleheader but was designated for assignment in between games. Zabala once again cleared waivers and was sent outright Jacksonville on September 15. He elected free agency on October 6.

=== Detroit Tigers ===
On December 27, 2022, Zabala signed a minor league deal with the Detroit Tigers and assigned to Triple-A Toledo Mud Hens. In 53 games out of the bullpen in 2023, he registered a 7–3 record and 4.25 ERA with 103 strikeouts and 5 saves across 65 2/3 innings pitched.

=== Hokkaido Nippon-Ham Fighters ===
On December 10, 2023, Zabala signed with the Hokkaido Nippon-Ham Fighters of Nippon Professional Baseball. He pitched in 16 games for the Fighters during his debut campaign, recording a 1.20 ERA with 15 strikeouts and one save across 15 innings of work.

Zabala made only two appearances for the Fighters in 2025, tallying a 3.86 ERA with two strikeouts across 2 2/3 innings pitched. He became a free agent following the season.

=== Los Angeles Angels ===
On January 14, 2026, Zabala signed a minor league contract with the Los Angeles Angels. He made nine appearances for the Double-A Rocket City Trash Pandas, struggling to a 6.30 ERA with 11 strikeouts across 10 innings pitched. Zabala was released by the Angels organization on May 4.

=== Toros de Tijuana ===
On May 29, 2026, Zabala signed with the Toros de Tijuana of the Mexican League.

== See also ==
- List of Major League Baseball players from the Dominican Republic
