= Drew Jackson =

American baseball player (born 1993)

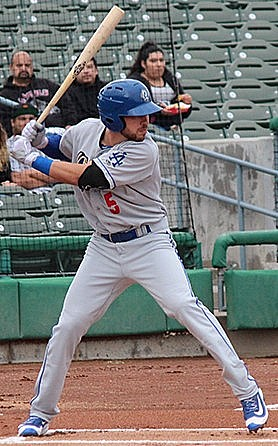
- Jackson with the Rancho Cucamonga Quakes
- Outfielder / Shortstop
- Born: July 28, 1993 (age 33); Berkeley, California, U.S.
- Batted: Right Threw: Right

MLB debut
- March 28, 2019, for the Baltimore Orioles

Last MLB appearance
- April 20, 2022, for the Oakland Athletics

MLB statistics
- Batting average: .000
- Home runs: 0
- Runs batted in: 0
- Stats at Baseball Reference

Teams
- Baltimore Orioles (2019); Oakland Athletics (2022)

Drew Hamilton Jackson (born July 28, 1993) is an American former professional baseball shortstop. He played college baseball for Stanford University. The Seattle Mariners selected Jackson in the fifth round of the 2015 Major League Baseball (MLB) draft. He played in Major League Baseball (MLB) for the Baltimore Orioles and Oakland Athletics.

== Career ==
Jackson attended Miramonte High School in Orinda, California. In 2011 he was first team all-Diablo Foothill Athletic League and won a Diablo Foothill Athletic League Golden Glove Award. In 2012 he was first team all-Diablo Foothill Athletic League, first team all-East Bay, and first team all-state. He batted .404 as a sophomore, .429 as a junior, and .439 as a senior.

He then enrolled at Stanford University, and played college baseball for the Stanford Cardinal. In 2013 and 2014, he played collegiate summer baseball with the Cotuit Kettleers of the Cape Cod Baseball League. Cotuit won the Championship in 2013. In 2015, Drew batted .320/.396/.388 and was the MVP of the team and All Pac-12.

=== Seattle Mariners ===
The Seattle Mariners selected Jackson in the fifth round of the 2015 Major League Baseball (MLB) draft. He signed and played for the Everett AquaSox of the Class A-Short Season Northwest League. He was named the league's Most Valuable Player after he slashed .358(2nd in the Northwest League)/.432(2nd)/.447 in 226 at bats with 64 runs (1st), two home runs, 26 RBIs, 7 sacrifice hits (3rd), and 47 stolen bases (1st) in 51 attempts, while playing shortstop in 59 games. He was also a mid-season All-Star, a post-season All-Star, a Baseball America Short-Season All-Star, named by Baseball America as the 5th-best prospect in the NWL, named to the NWL All-Star team as the starting shortstop, and named an MiLB.com Organization All-Star.

Jackson spent the 2016 season with the Bakersfield Blaze of the Class A-Advanced California League. With them he batted .258/.332/.345 in 524 at bats with 87 runs (3rd in the California League), six home runs, 47 RBIs, 9 sacrifice hits (3rd), and 16 stolen bases, while playing shortstop.

=== Los Angeles Dodgers ===
On March 1, 2017, the Mariners traded Jackson and Aneurys Zabala to the Los Angeles Dodgers in exchange for Chase De Jong. The Dodgers assigned him to the Rancho Cucamonga Quakes of the California League, where he played in 66 games, batting .254/.367/.429 with eight home runs and 30 RBI before his promotion to the Tulsa Drillers of the Double–A Texas League, where he finished the season, hitting .234/.346/.324 with one home run and ten RBI in 29 games.

In 2018, Jackson was named to represent the Drillers at the mid-season Texas League All-Star Game. In 2018 with Tulsa he batted .252/.356/.447 with 15 home runs, 13 hit by pitch (3rd in the league), six sacrifice hits (4th), and 22 stolen bases (9th).

=== Baltimore Orioles ===
The Philadelphia Phillies selected Jackson in the Rule 5 Draft on December 13, 2018, and traded him that day to the Baltimore Orioles in exchange for international bonus slot money. During spring training in 2019, the Orioles tried out Jackson as an outfielder. Jackson made the Orioles' Opening Day roster. He batted 0-for-3 with a walk before being designated for assignment on April 5 following the signing of Dan Straily.

=== Los Angeles Dodgers (second stint) ===
Jackson was returned to the Dodgers on April 10, 2019. He spent the rest of the 2019 season with the Triple-A Oklahoma City Dodgers, hitting .209/.300/.319 with six home runs and 28 RBI. With Oklahoma City he played 36 games at second base, 21 games at shortstop, 18 games in center field, 7 games at third base, and one game in right field.

Jackson did not play in 2020 due to the cancellation of the minor league season because of the COVID-19 pandemic.

=== New York Mets ===
On December 10, 2020, the New York Mets selected Jackson in the minor league portion of the 2020 Rule 5 Draft. He spent the 2021 season with the Triple-A Syracuse Mets, hitting .251/.397(10th in the league)/.424 with 9 home runs, 37 RBIs, 53 walks (7th), 4 sacrifice hits (3rd), and 24 stolen bases (8th) in 27 attempts, in 309 plate appearances. With Syracuse he played 32 games at second base, 27 games at shortstop, 10 games at third base, 9 games in left field, 6 games in center field, 6 games in right field, two at first base, and two as a pitcher in relief appearances. Jackson elected free agency following the season, on November 7, 2021.

=== Oakland Athletics ===
On December 3, 2021, Jackson signed a minor league deal with the Oakland Athletics. On April 15, 2022, Jackson was added to the Athletics roster for their road trip to Toronto as a coronavirus-related substitute. Jackson appeared in 3 games for Oakland, going 0-for-3 with a strikeout before he was placed on the injured list on April 23 after contracting COVID-19. On May 3, he was activated off of the injured list and returned to the Triple-A Las Vegas Aviators after being removed from the 40-man roster.

With Las Vegas he batted .243/.353/.297 with 8 steals in 9 attempts in 148 at bats in 2022. He played 13 games at shortstop, 12 games in right field, 11 games in left field, 9 games at second base, 5 games in center field, and one game at third base. He was released on July 28, 2022.

=== San Francisco Giants ===
On August 4, 2022, Jackson signed a minor league contract with the San Francisco Giants. In 10 games for the Triple–A Sacramento River Cats, he batted .200/.226/.533 with 3 home runs and 5 RBI. On August 23, Jackson was released by the Giants organization.

== Personal life ==
His older brother, Brett Jackson, played in Major League Baseball as an outfielder for the Chicago Cubs and Arizona Diamondbacks.

== See also ==
- Rule 5 draft results
