= Trey Lipscomb =

American baseball player (born 2000)

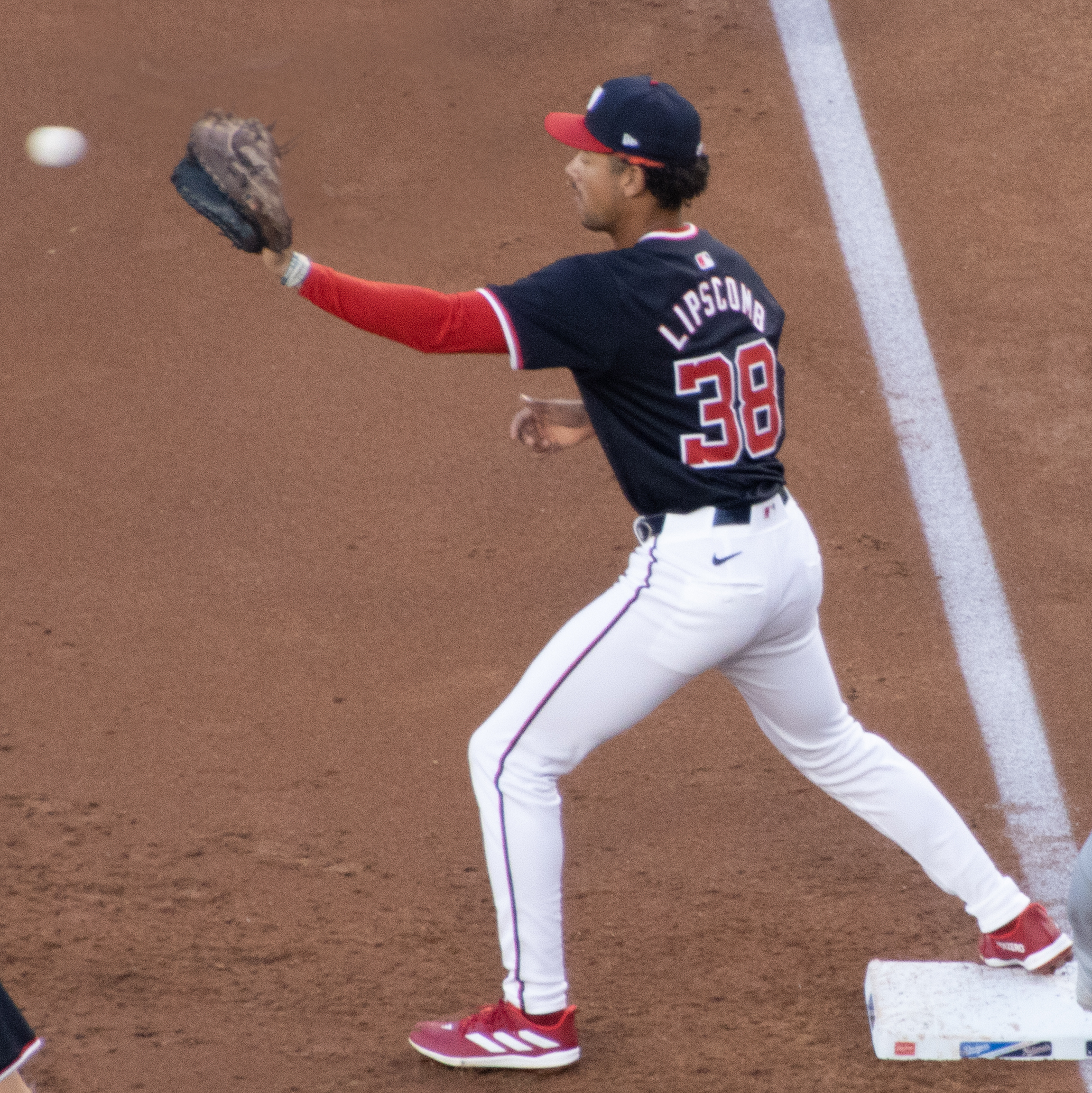
- Lipscomb with the Washington Nationals in 2024

Washington Nationals
- Third baseman
- Born: June 14, 2000 (age 26); Summerville, South Carolina, U.S.
- Bats: Right Throws: Right

MLB debut
- March 30, 2024, for the Washington Nationals

MLB statistics (through 2025 season)
- Batting average: .206
- Home runs: 1
- Runs batted in: 10
- Stats at Baseball Reference

Teams
- Washington Nationals (2024–2025)

LaVictor Antwain "Trey" Lipscomb (born June 14, 2000) is an American professional baseball third baseman in the Washington Nationals organization. He made his Major League Baseball (MLB) debut in 2024.

== Amateur career ==
Lipscomb grew up in Frederick, Maryland and attended Urbana High School. He committed to play college baseball at Tennessee during his junior year. As a senior, Lipscomb hit .455 with four home runs and also had five wins and a 1.59 ERA as a pitcher.

Lipscomb attended the University of Tennessee and played college baseball for the Tennessee Volunteers for four seasons. He played in 12 games and had one hit in 14 at bats during his freshman season. After the 2019 season, Lipscomb played collegiate summer baseball for the Wareham Gatemen of the Cape Cod Baseball League. Lipscomb batted .310 in 14 games as a junior. After the season, he played for the Johnstown Mill Rats of the Prospect League. He was named first team All-Southeastern Conference after batting .355 with 22 home runs and 84 RBIs during his senior season.

== Professional career ==
The Washington Nationals selected Lipscomb in the third round of the 2022 Major League Baseball draft. He signed with the Nationals on July 21, 2022, and received a $758,900 signing bonus. The Nationals assigned Lipscomb to the Fredericksburg Nationals of the Single-A Carolina League to start his professional career, where he batted .299 in 23 games. He was assigned to the High-A Wilmington Blue Rocks at the beginning of the 2023 season. Lipscomb was promoted to the Double-A Harrisburg Senators after batting .251 with 14 doubles, four home runs, 27 RBI, and six stolen bases in 49 games with Wilmington.

On March 30, 2024, Lipscomb was selected to the 40-man roster and promoted to the major leagues for the first time following an injury to Nick Senzel. In 61 appearances for the Nationals during his rookie campaign, Lipscomb slashed .200/.268/.232 with one home run, 10 RBI, and 11 stolen bases.

Lipscomb was optioned to the Triple-A Rochester Red Wings to begin the 2025 season. He played in three games for Washington during the year, going 2-for-4 (.500). On November 6, 2025, Lipscomb was removed from the 40-man roster and sent outright to Rochester.

In 2026, he played in 134 games with Triple-A Rochester Red Wings batting .287/.325/.536 with 32 home runs, 94 RBIs and 15 stolen bases.
