= Dylan Floro =

American baseball player (born 1990)

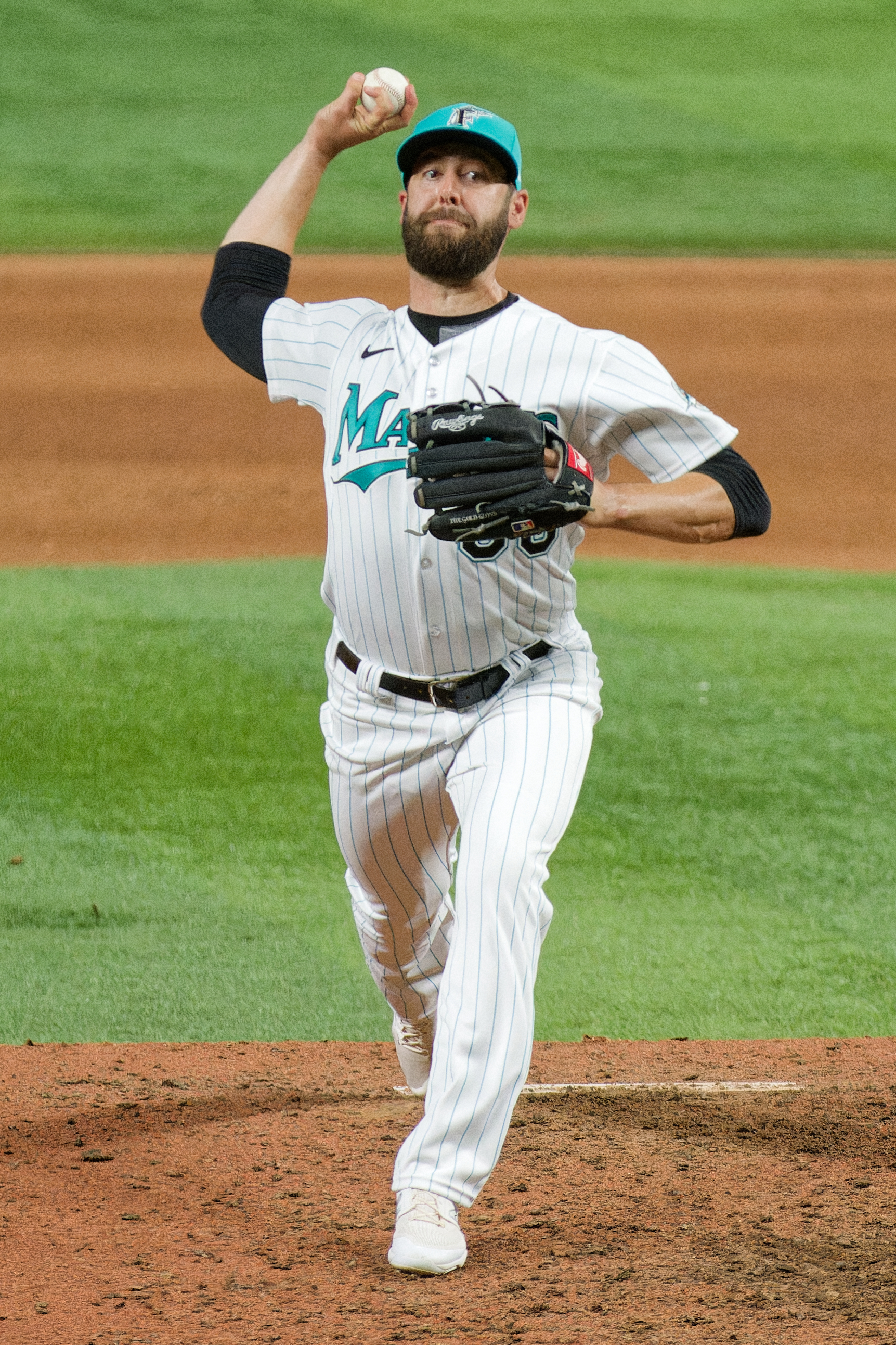
- Floro with the Marlins in 2023

Free agent
- Pitcher
- Born: December 27, 1990 (age 35); Merced, California, U.S.
- Bats: Left Throws: Right

MLB debut
- July 7, 2016, for the Tampa Bay Rays

MLB statistics (through 2024 season)
- Win–loss record: 32–26
- Earned run average: 3.49
- Strikeouts: 355
- Saves: 32
- Stats at Baseball Reference

Teams
- Tampa Bay Rays (2016); Chicago Cubs (2017); Cincinnati Reds (2018); Los Angeles Dodgers (2018–2020); Miami Marlins (2021–2023); Minnesota Twins (2023); Washington Nationals (2024); Arizona Diamondbacks (2024)

Career highlights and awards
- World Series champion (2020)

Dylan Lee Floro (born December 27, 1990) is an American professional baseball pitcher who is a free agent. He has previously played in Major League Baseball (MLB) for the Tampa Bay Rays, Chicago Cubs, Cincinnati Reds, Los Angeles Dodgers, Miami Marlins, Minnesota Twins, Washington Nationals, and Arizona Diamondbacks. He played college baseball for the Cal State Fullerton Titans. Floro was drafted by the Rays in the 13th round of the 2012 MLB draft, and made his MLB debut in 2016.

== Amateur career ==
Floro attended Buhach Colony High School in Atwater, California. During his high school career he had a 33–5 win–loss record.

He was drafted by the Tampa Bay Rays in the 20th round of the 2009 Major League Baseball draft but did not sign and attended California State University Fullerton to play college baseball. He played for the Titans from 2010 to 2012. During his career he went 21–8 with a 3.29 earned run average (ERA) and 178 strikeouts. In 2011, he played collegiate summer baseball for the Hyannis Harbor Hawks of the Cape Cod Baseball League.

== Professional career ==
=== Tampa Bay Rays ===
Floro was again drafted by the Rays, this time in the 13th round of the 2012 MLB draft. This time he signed with the Rays and made his professional debut that season with the Hudson Valley Renegades. Pitching for the Bowling Green Hot Rods and Charlotte Stone Crabs in 2013, Floro went 11–2 with a 1.77 ERA and was named the Rays Minor League Pitcher of the Year. In 2014, he pitched for the Double-A Montgomery Biscuits. In 2015, he pitched for the Triple-A Durham Bulls and was 9–12 with a 5.02 ERA.

Floro was called up to the Major Leagues on July 6, 2016. He made his major league debut on July 7 against the Angels. In 2016 with the Rays he was 0–1 with a 4.20 ERA.

=== Chicago Cubs ===
Floro was waived by the Rays and claimed by the Chicago Cubs on January 17, 2017. Floro was designated for assignment following the acquisition of Eddie Butler on February 1. He cleared waivers and was assigned to the Triple–A Iowa Cubs on February 4. The Cubs promoted Floro to the major leagues on May 8. In 2017 with the Cubs he was 0–0 with a 6.52 ERA.

=== Los Angeles Dodgers ===
Floro was claimed off waivers by the Los Angeles Dodgers on August 4, 2017. He pitched in 8 games for the Triple–A Oklahoma City Dodgers and was 0–1 with a 5.56 ERA. On August 18, Floro was designated for assignment by Los Angeles following the acquisition of Curtis Granderson.

=== Cincinnati Reds ===
On January 3, 2018, Floro signed a minor league contract with the Cincinnati Reds. He had his contract purchased on April 13, 2018. In 25 appearances, he was 3–2 in 36 1/3 innings.

=== Los Angeles Dodgers (second stint) ===
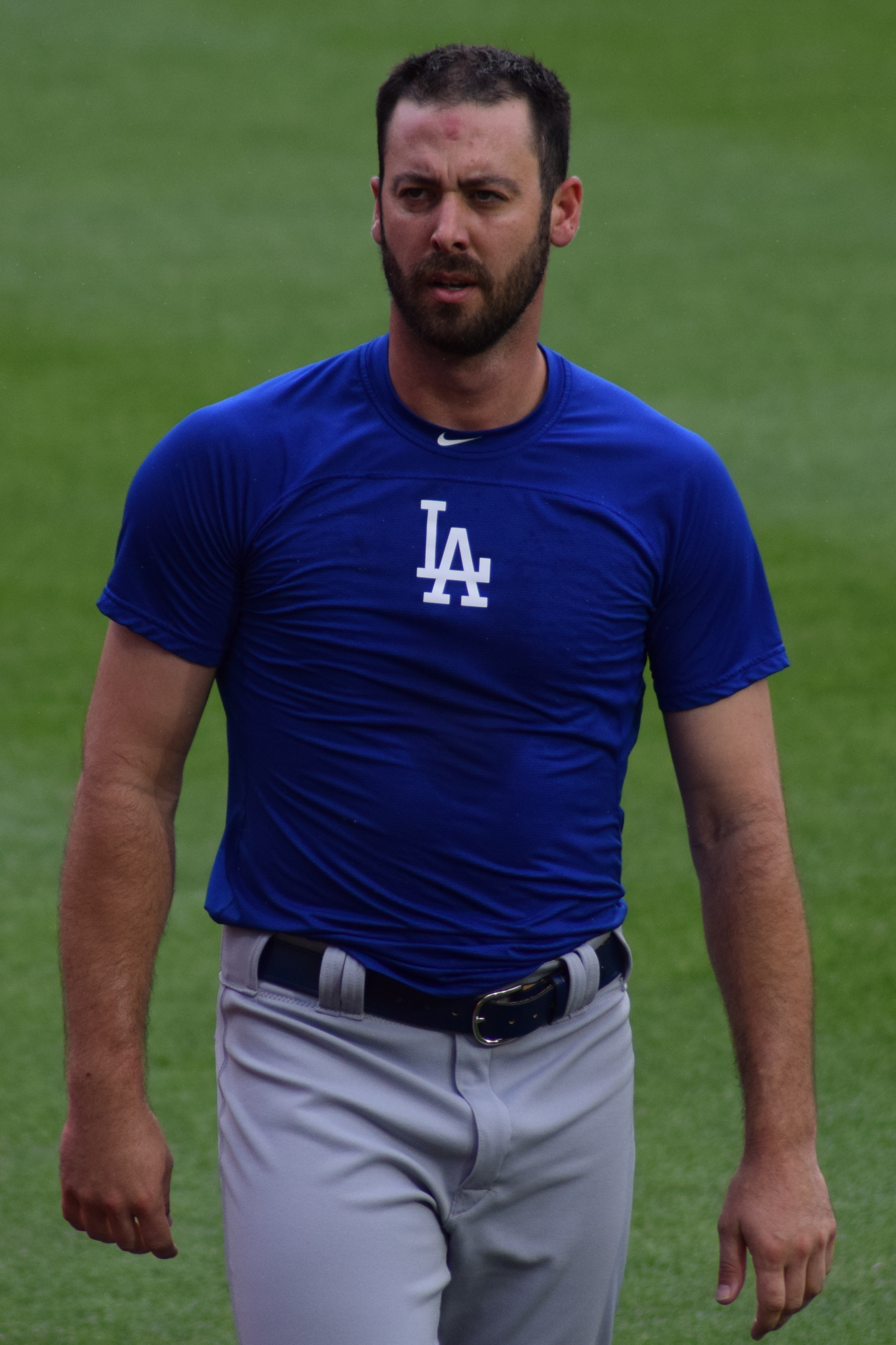
Floro with the LA Dodgers

Floro was traded back to the Dodgers on July 4, 2018 (along with Zach Neal and international bonus pool space) in exchange for James Marinan and Aneurys Zabala. After being acquired, Floro posted strong numbers for the remainder of the season, posting an ERA of 1.63 in 29 games. He was the losing pitcher in Game 4 of the 2018 World Series.

In 2019, he appeared in 46.2 innings over 50 games for the Dodgers, with a 4.24 ERA and a record of 5–3.

In the pandemic-shortened 2020 season, he was 3–0 with a 2.59 ERA in 24.1 innings over 25 games. He pitched in one game in the 2020 NLDS, two games in the 2020 NLCS and three games in the 2020 World Series, allowing five runs in 5 1/3 innings. However, the Dodgers won the championship, giving him his first World Series ring.

=== Miami Marlins ===
On February 12, 2021, the Dodgers traded Floro to the Miami Marlins in exchange for Alex Vesia and Kyle Hurt. In 68 appearances out of the bullpen, he accumulated a 6–6 record and 2.81 ERA with 62 strikeouts and 15 saves across 64 innings pitched.

Floro made 56 relief outings for Miami in 2022, compiling a 3.02 ERA with 48 strikeouts and 10 saves over 53 2/3 innings of work. On November 18, 2022, Floro signed a one-year, $3.9 million contract with the Marlins, avoiding arbitration.

Floro made 43 appearances for the Marlins in 2023, registering a 3–5 record and 4.54 ERA with 41 strikeouts across 39 2/3 innings pitched.

=== Minnesota Twins ===
On July 26, 2023, Floro was traded to the Minnesota Twins in exchange for Jorge López. In 19 games for the Twins, he posted a 5.29 ERA with 22 hits and 17 strikeouts in 17.0 innings of work. On September 26, Floro was designated for assignment following Brock Stewart's activation from the injured list. He was released on September 29.

=== Washington Nationals ===
On December 12, 2023, Floro signed a one-year contract with the Washington Nationals for $2.25 million plus incentives. In 51 relief outings for Washington in 2024, Floro recorded a 2.06 ERA with 40 strikeouts across 52 1/3 innings pitched.

=== Arizona Diamondbacks ===
On July 30, 2024, the Nationals traded Floro to the Arizona Diamondbacks in exchange for Andrés Chaparro. In 15 appearances for the Diamondbacks, he struggled to a 9.37 ERA with 8 strikeouts across 16 1/3 innings pitched. Floro was designated for assignment by Arizona on September 15. He was released by the Diamondbacks organization on September 17.

=== Athletics ===
On February 20, 2025, Floro signed a minor league contract with the Athletics. In 16 appearances for the Triple-A Las Vegas Aviators, he struggled to a 1–2 record and 7.04 ERA with 12 strikeouts across 15 1/3 innings pitched. Floro was released by the Athletics organization on June 23.

== Personal life ==
Floro and his wife, Amber, married in 2015 and have two daughters.
