= Nasim Nuñez =

American baseball player (born 2000)

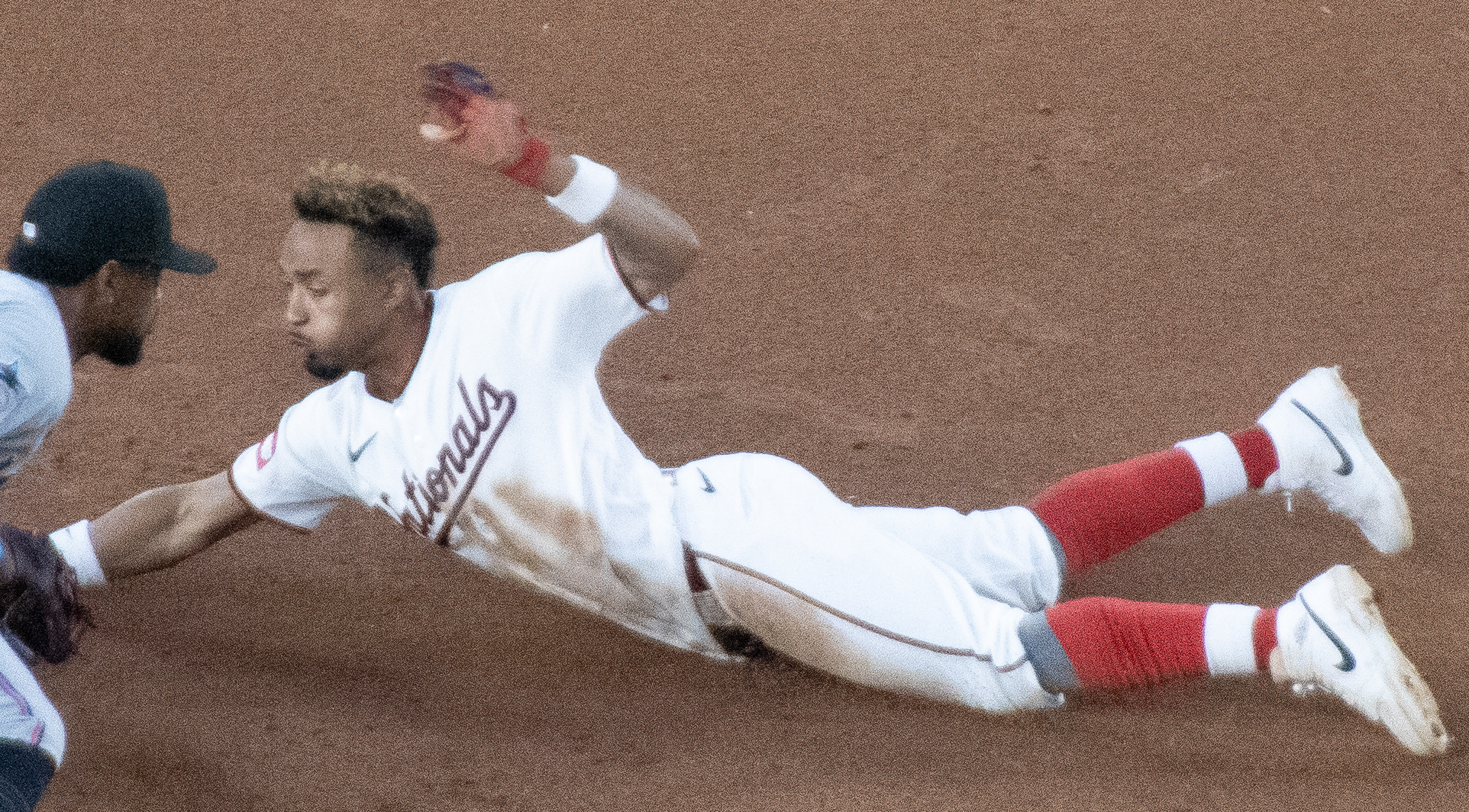
- Nuñez with the Washington Nationals in 2026

Washington Nationals – No. 26
- Infielder
- Born: August 18, 2000 (age 26); The Bronx, New York, U.S.
- Bats: Switch Throws: Right

MLB debut
- March 30, 2024, for the Washington Nationals

MLB statistics (through 2026 season)
- Batting average: .216
- Home runs: 5
- Runs batted in: 51
- Stolen bases: 66
- Stats at Baseball Reference

Teams
- Washington Nationals (2024–present)

Career highlights and awards
- NL stolen base leader (2026)

Nasim Emmanuel Nuñez (born August 18, 2000) is an American professional baseball infielder for the Washington Nationals of Major League Baseball (MLB). He made his MLB debut in 2024. In 2026, he led the league in stolen bases.

== Career ==
=== Miami Marlins ===
Nuñez attended Collins Hill High School in Suwanee, Georgia. He was drafted in the second round with the 46th overall selection in the 2019 Major League Baseball draft by the Miami Marlins. He signed, forgoing his commitment to play college baseball at Clemson University.

After signing, Nuñez was assigned to the rookie–level Gulf Coast League Marlins where he compiled a .211/.354/.251 slash line and 28 stolen bases over 48 games. He did not play in a game in 2020 due to the cancellation of the minor league season because of the COVID-19 pandemic. Nuñez began the 2021 season with the Single–A Jupiter Hammerheads, batting .243 with 10 RBI and 33 stolen bases over 52 games. He missed time at the end of the season with a leg injury.

Nuñez split the 2022 season between the High–A Beloit Snappers and Double–A Pensacola Blue Wahoos, accumulating a .251/.384/.317 batting line with two home runs, 41 RBI, and 70 stolen bases across 123 games. He returned to Pensacola in 2023, playing in 125 games and hitting .225/.341/.286 with five home runs, 43 RBI, and 52 stolen bases.

Nuñez played in the All-Star Futures Game in 2023 and was named the game's Most Valuable Player with 3 RBIs.

=== Washington Nationals ===
On December 6, 2023, the Washington Nationals selected Nuñez from the Marlins in the Rule 5 draft. Nuñez made the team's Opening Day roster out of spring training. In 51 appearances for Washington during his rookie campaign, Nuñez batted .246/.370/.262 with one RBI and eight stolen bases.

Nuñez was optioned to the Triple–A Rochester Red Wings to begin the 2025 season. After 3B Paul DeJong got hit in the face by a ball in 2025, Nuñez was again called up to the MLB. He was sent down when Brady House was called up for his major league debut on June 16, 2025. On September 3, Nuñez hit his first two major league home runs off of Miami Marlins pitchers Eury Pérez and Luarbert Arias.

In 2026 Nuñez played in 147 games for the Nationals, and despite having only 431 at-bats, led the league in stolen bases with 49, which also set a Nationals (2005-present) team record. He was successful in 49 of 59 attempts. For the year he batted .209/.291/.244 with one home run and 37 RBI.

== See also ==
- Rule 5 draft results
