= Andrés Chaparro =

Venezuelan baseball player (born 1999)

Washington Nationals – No. 87
- First baseman / Third baseman
- Born: May 4, 1999 (age 27); El Vigia, Venezuela
- Bats: Right Throws: Right

MLB debut
- August 13, 2024, for the Washington Nationals

MLB statistics (through 2026 season)
- Batting average: .234
- Home runs: 18
- Runs batted in: 59
- Stats at Baseball Reference

Teams
- Washington Nationals (2024–present)

Andrés Alfonso Chaparro (born May 4, 1999) is a Venezuelan professional baseball first baseman and third baseman for the Washington Nationals of Major League Baseball (MLB).

== Career ==
=== New York Yankees ===
Chaparro signed with the New York Yankees as an international free agent on July 2, 2015. He made his professional debut in 2016 with the Dominican Summer League Yankees, hitting .238 in 50 games. Chaparro spent the 2017 season with the rookie-level Pulaski Yankees, batting to a .191/.249/.348 slash line with 7 home runs and 20 RBI.

Chaparro spent the 2018 and 2019 seasons with the Low-A Staten Island Yankees, hitting .191 across 60 games in 2018, and .246 across 57 games in 2019. He did not play in a game in 2020 due to the cancellation of the minor league season because of the COVID-19 pandemic.

Chaparro returned to action in 2021 with the Single-A Tampa Tarpons and High-A Hudson Valley Renegades, for whom he played in 101 games and hit .267/.381/.468 with 15 home runs and 73 RBI. After the season, he played in the Arizona Fall League. Chaparro played 2022 with the rookie-level Florida Complex League Yankees, Tampa, and Double-A Somerset Patriots. In 71 games between the three affiliates, he hit .296/.370/.592 with 20 home runs and 55 RBI.

Chaparro spent the 2023 season with the Triple-A Scranton/Wilkes-Barre RailRiders, playing in 137 contests and hitting .247/.331/.444 with new career highs in home runs (23) and RBI (89). He elected free agency following the season on November 6, 2023.

=== Arizona Diamondbacks ===
On November 19, 2023, Chaparro signed a minor league contract with the Arizona Diamondbacks. In 95 games for the Triple-A Reno Aces in 2024, he batted .332/.403/.564 with 19 home runs and 75 RBIs.

=== Washington Nationals ===
On July 30, 2024, the Diamondbacks traded Chaparro to the Washington Nationals in exchange for Dylan Floro. In 10 games for the Triple-A Rochester Red Wings, Chaparro hit .286/.419/.657 with four home runs and 10 RBI. On August 13, Chaparro was selected to the 40-man roster and promoted to the major leagues for the first time. He made his MLB debut that day against the Baltimore Orioles, going 3-for-4 with three doubles. He hit .215 with four home runs in his first MLB season.

Chaparro made 34 appearances for Washington during the 2025 campaign, slashing .182/.247/.258 with one home run and five RBI.

In 2026 Chaparro got significantly more playing time with the Nationals, appearing in 83 games and batting .268/.364/.530, with 13 home runs and 38 RBI. He had what was described as an "insanely strong finish": with a slash line after the All-Star break of .306/.387/.625 and an OPS of 1.012, including 12 of his 13 home runs, two of them in the final game of the season. He also had one of MLB's longest home runs of the season on July 17, 2026, hitting a 467 foot home run against the Athletics.
