= Jeimer Candelario =

Dominican-American baseball player (born 1993)

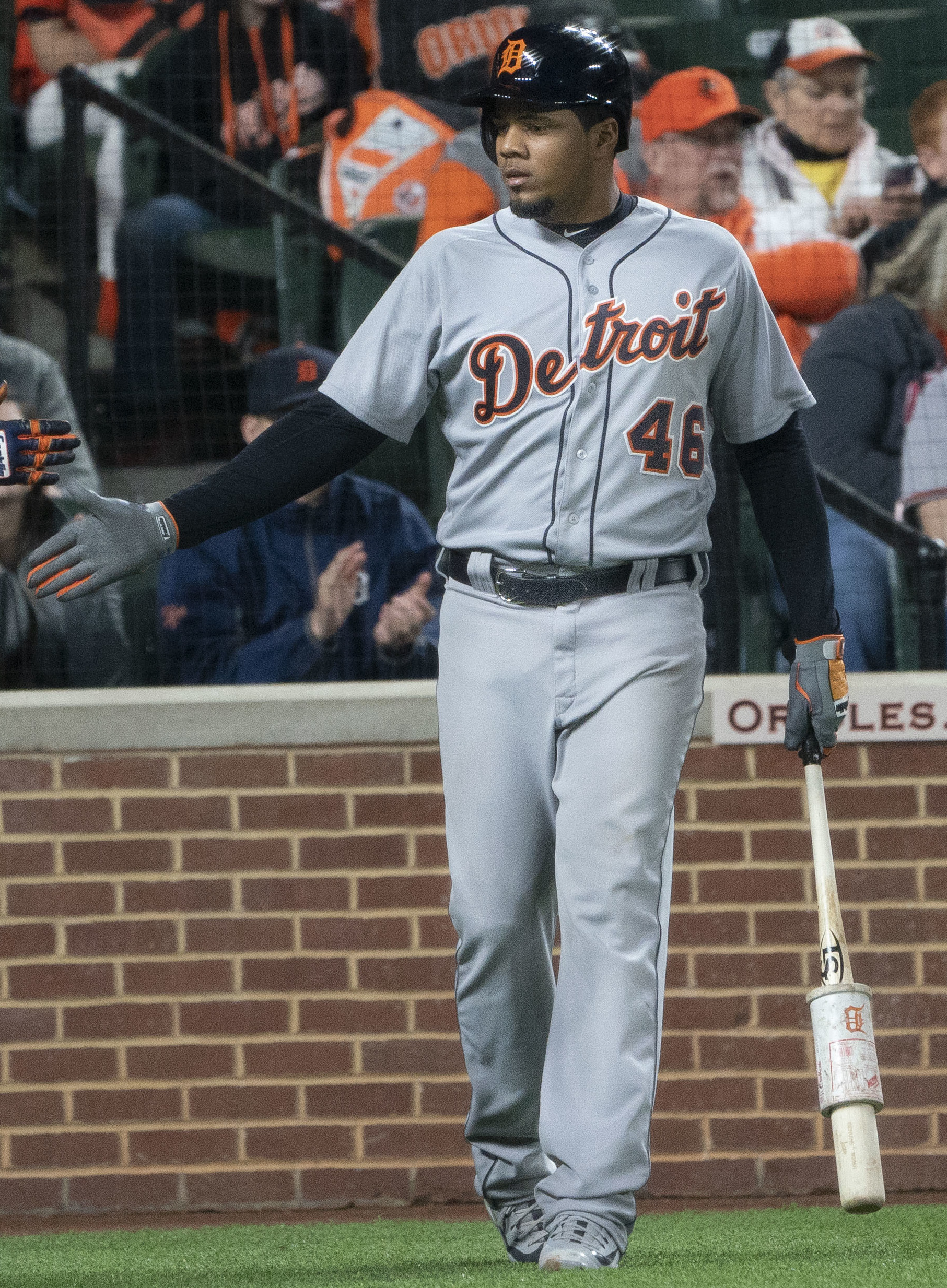
- Candelario with the Detroit Tigers in 2018

Free agent
- Third baseman / First baseman
- Born: November 24, 1993 (age 32); New York City, New York, U.S.
- Bats: Switch Throws: Right

MLB debut
- July 3, 2016, for the Chicago Cubs

MLB statistics (through 2026 season)
- Batting average: .236
- Home runs: 110
- Runs batted in: 384
- Stats at Baseball Reference

Teams
- Chicago Cubs (2016–2017); Detroit Tigers (2017–2022); Washington Nationals (2023); Chicago Cubs (2023); Cincinnati Reds (2024–2025); Los Angeles Angels (2026)

Jeimer Candelario (/ˈdʒeɪmər/ JAY-mer; born November 24, 1993) is an American professional baseball third baseman and first baseman who is a free agent. He has previously played in Major League Baseball (MLB) for the Chicago Cubs, Detroit Tigers, Washington Nationals, Cincinnati Reds, and Los Angeles Angels. He has played for the Dominican Republic national baseball team.

== Early life ==
Candelario was born in New York City and moved to the Dominican Republic when he was five years old so that his father could open a baseball training center.

== Career ==
=== Chicago Cubs (2010–2017) ===
==== Minor leagues ====
Candelario signed with the Chicago Cubs on November 20, 2010. He made his professional debut the next year with the Dominican Summer League Cubs. Candelario spent 2012 with the Boise Hawks of the Low–A Northwest League and the 2013 season with the Kane County Cougars of the Single–A Midwest League. He spent 2014 with Kane County and the Daytona Cubs. He started 2015 with the Myrtle Beach Pelicans of the High–A Carolina League and was promoted to the Tennessee Smokies of the Double–A Southern League during the season. The Cubs added him to their 40-man roster after the season.

With the Iowa Cubs in 2016, Candelario batted .333 in his first 25 games for the Iowa Cubs of the Triple–A Pacific Coast League.

==== Major leagues ====
The Cubs promoted Candelario to the major league team on July 3, 2016, to replace Chris Coghlan, who was placed on the disabled list. He made his major-league debut the same day, against the New York Mets. He was optioned back to Iowa on July 9. Candelario appeared in five games for the Cubs in 2016 and finished with a .091 batting average. The Cubs went on to win the 2016 World Series. Candelario was not included on the Cubs' postseason roster, but was still on the 40-man roster at the time and won his first World Series title.

=== Detroit Tigers (2017–2022) ===
On July 31, 2017, the Cubs traded Candelario with Isaac Paredes and a player to be named later or cash considerations to the Detroit Tigers in exchange for Alex Avila and Justin Wilson. The Tigers assigned him to the Toledo Mud Hens of the Triple-A International League. On August 7, the Tigers promoted Candelario to the major leagues from Toledo. With the 2017 Tigers, Candelario went 31-for-94 (.330) while hitting 2 home runs and driving in 13.

Candelario began the 2018 as the Tigers’ regular third baseman. On May 14, he was placed on the 10-day disabled list with left wrist tendinitis. On May 26, in just his second game after returning from the disabled list, Candelario had the first multiple-homer game of his career as he went deep in his first two at-bats against Chicago White Sox starter Hector Santiago. For the 2018 season, Candelario hit .224 with 19 home runs and 54 RBIs.

In an 11-inning contest against the Toronto Blue Jays on March 31, 2019, Candelario had five hits in a game for the first time in his career. After struggling to a .192 batting average with 46 strikeouts in his first 146 at-bats of 2019, Candelario was optioned to Toledo. He was called up towards the end of the season. Overall, he finished the season hitting .203 with eight home runs and 32 RBIs.

Candelario began the 2020 season at third base for the Tigers, but was moved to first base following an injury to C. J. Cron. He was named AL Player of the Week for September 7–13, 2020, his first such honor. In eight games during the week, Candelario hit .423 (11-for-26) with four doubles, three home runs, nine RBI, four walks and a .923 slugging percentage. During a doubleheader on September 10 (each game shortened to seven innings per 2020 MLB rules), Candelario hit a home run in each game, becoming the first Tiger to do so since Leonys Martín in 2018. For the 2020 season, Candelario hit .297 with seven home runs and 29 RBIs in 52 games, and led the Tigers with 21 extra-base hits.

On January 15, 2021, the Tigers and Candelario agreed to a one-year, $2.85 million contract, avoiding arbitration. Candelario hit .271 for the season, with 16 home runs, 67 RBIs, and an MLB-leading 42 doubles. For the second straight season, Candelario led the Tigers in extra-base hits, with 61, and also finished with a team-best 3.2 Wins Above Replacement (WAR). Candelario was named Tiger of the Year for the second straight season by the Detroit chapter of the Baseball Writers' Association of America. He is the first player since Miguel Cabrera (2012 and 2013) to win this award in back-to-back seasons.

On March 22, 2022, Candelario signed a one-year, $5.8 million contract with the Tigers, avoiding salary arbitration. On June 7, he was placed on the Tigers' 10-day injured list with a left shoulder subluxation, retroactive to June 6. Candelario hit .217 with 13 home runs and 50 RBI for the 2022 season. On November 18, he was non tendered and became a free agent.

=== Washington Nationals (2023) ===
On November 29, 2022, Candelario signed a one-year contract for $5 million and another $1 million in achievable incentives with the Washington Nationals. Candelario made 99 appearances for the Nationals in 2023, slashing .258/.342/.481 with 16 home runs, 53 RBI, and six stolen bases.

=== Chicago Cubs (2023) ===
On July 31, 2023, the Nationals traded Candelario to the Chicago Cubs in exchange for DJ Herz and Kevin Made. In 41 appearances for the Cubs, he batted .234/.318/.445 with six home runs, 17 RBI, and two stolen bases. Candelario became a free agent following the season.

=== Cincinnati Reds (2024–2025) ===
On December 11, 2023, Candelario signed a three-year, $45 million, contract that also included a club option for a fourth year, with the Cincinnati Reds. He made 112 appearances for Cincinnati during the 2024 season, hitting .225/.279/.429 with 20 home runs, 56 RBI, and four stolen bases.

Candelario made 22 appearances for Cincinnati in 2025, batting .113/.198/.213 with two home runs and 10 RBI. Candelario was designated for assignment by the Reds on June 23, 2025. He was released by Cincinnati after clearing waivers on June 29.

=== New York Yankees ===
On July 5, 2025, Candelario signed a minor league contract with the New York Yankees. He made 61 appearances for the Triple-A Scranton/Wilkes-Barre RailRiders, slashing .203/.289/.357 with seven home runs and 31 RBI. Candelario elected free agency following the season on November 6.

=== Los Angeles Angels ===
On February 3, 2026, Candelario signed a minor league contract with the Los Angeles Angels. On March 24, the Angels selected Candelario's contract after he made the team's Opening Day roster. In seven appearances for Los Angeles, he went 2-for-18 (.111) with one walk. On April 11, Candelario was designated for assignment by the Angels. He cleared waivers and was sent outright to the Triple-A Salt Lake Bees on April 13. He elected free agency on October 7.
