= Darren Baker (baseball) =

American baseball player (born 1999)

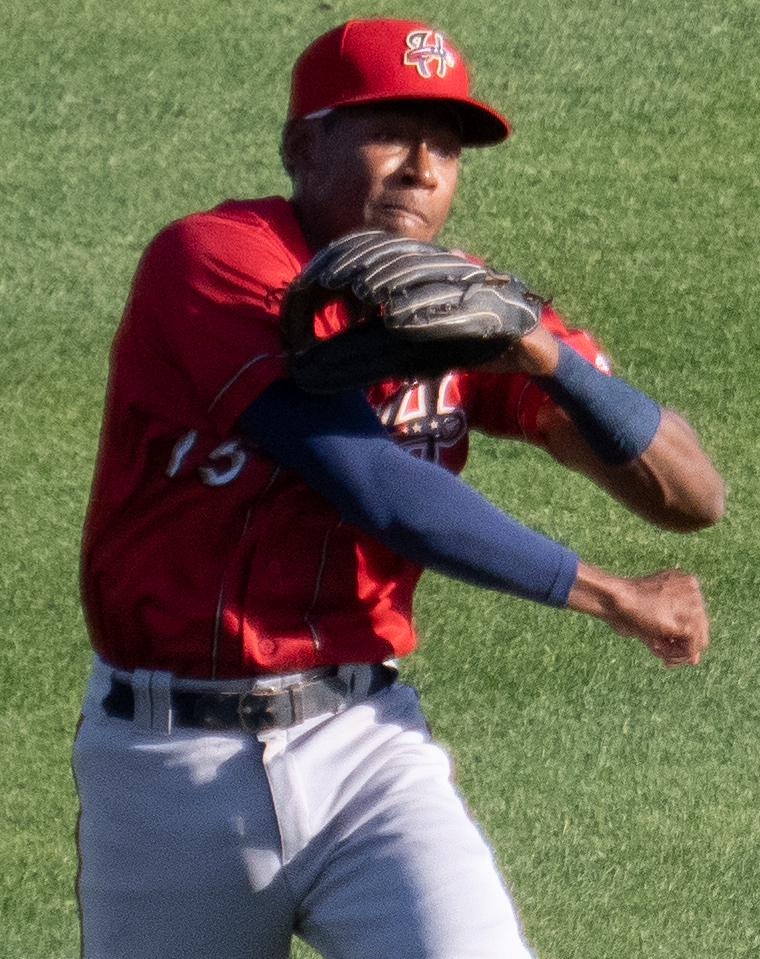
- Baker with the Harrisburg Senators in 2022

Free agent
- Second baseman
- Born: February 11, 1999 (age 27); Redwood City, California, U.S.
- Bats: Left Throws: Right

MLB debut
- September 1, 2024, for the Washington Nationals

MLB statistics (through 2024 season)
- Batting average: .500
- Home runs: 0
- Runs batted in: 0
- Stats at Baseball Reference

Teams
- Washington Nationals (2024)

Darren John Baker (born February 11, 1999) is an American professional baseball second baseman who is a free agent. He has previously played in Major League Baseball (MLB) for the Washington Nationals.

== Early life ==
Baker is the son of former MLB player and manager Dusty Baker. As a toddler, Darren served as the batboy for the San Francisco Giants while his father was managing the team. During game five of the 2002 World Series, Darren narrowly missed being run over at home plate by baserunner David Bell. He was lifted out of the way by Giants first baseman J. T. Snow before a collision could occur. Major League Baseball set a minimum age of 14 for batboys as a result of the incident.

== Amateur career ==
Baker attended Jesuit High School in Sacramento, California. He was drafted by the Washington Nationals in the 27th round of the 2017 Major League Baseball draft, but did not sign and played college baseball at the University of California, Berkeley. In 2018, he played collegiate summer baseball with the Brewster Whitecaps of the Cape Cod Baseball League, and returned to the league in 2019 with the Wareham Gatemen and was named a league all-star. After four years at Berkeley, he was again drafted by the Nationals, this time in the 10th round of the 2021 MLB draft, and signed.

== Professional career ==
=== Washington Nationals ===
Baker spent his first professional season with the rookie–level Florida Complex League Nationals and Single–A Fredericksburg Nationals. He played 2022 with the High–A Wilmington Blue Rocks and Double–A Harrisburg Senators, batting a combined .280/.343/.365 with three home runs, 39 RBI, and 15 stolen bases. In July, Baker played in the All-Star Futures Game. Baker played for the Peoria Javelinas of the Arizona Fall League following the regular season.

Baker was promoted to the Triple–A Rochester Red Wings to start the 2023 season. In 99 games for Rochester, he slashed .273/.338/.340 with three home runs, 41 RBI, and 19 stolen bases. On September 1, 2024, Baker was selected to the 40-man roster and promoted to the major leagues for the first time. In his debut, he hit a single to center field on the first pitch he saw. In 9 games for Washington during his rookie campaign, Baker went 7-for-14 (.500).

Baker was optioned to Triple-A Rochester to begin the 2025 season, where he batted .260/.348/.325 with one home run, 22 RBI, and 26 stolen bases. On September 3, 2025, Baker was designated for assignment by the Nationals. He cleared waivers and was sent outright to Triple-A Rochester on September 5. Baker was released by the Nationals organization on September 29.

=== Chicago White Sox ===
On February 14, 2026, Baker signed a minor league contract with the Chicago White Sox. He made 13 appearances split between the rookie–level Arizona Complex League White Sox and Triple–A Charlotte Knights, batting a cumulative .220/.304/.293 with five RBI and three stolen bases. Baker was released by the White Sox organization on July 31.

=== San Francisco Giants ===
On September 1, 2026, Baker signed a minor league contract with the San Francisco Giants. In 13 games with Triple-A Sacramento River Cats he batted .240/.264/.240 with no home runs, 3 RBIs and 5 stolen bases. He elected free agency on November 2.
