= DJ Herz =

American baseball player (born 2001)

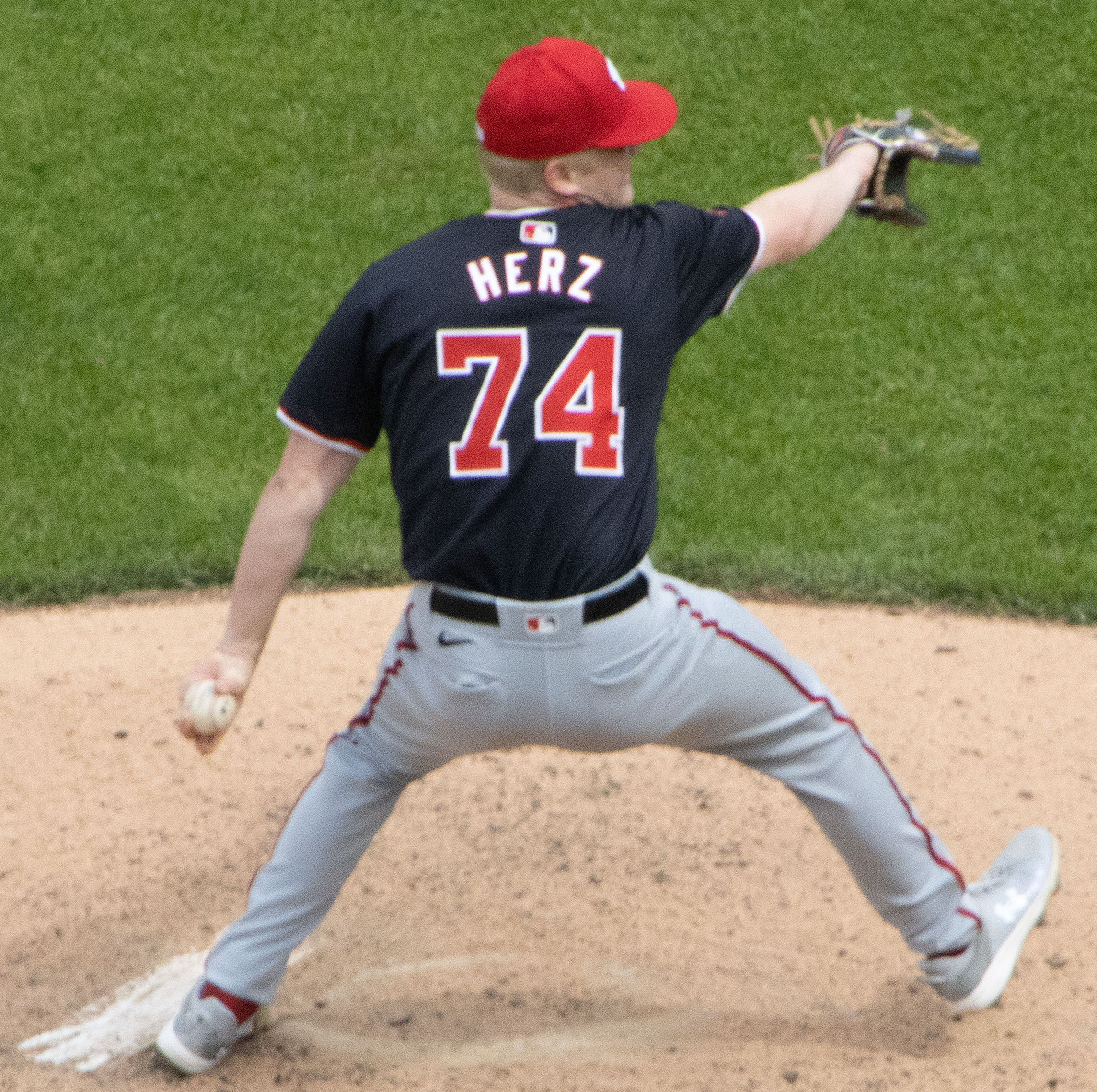
- Herz with the Washington Nationals in 2024

Washington Nationals – No. 77
- Pitcher
- Born: January 4, 2001 (age 25); Fayetteville, North Carolina, U.S.
- Bats: Right Throws: Left

MLB debut
- June 4, 2024, for the Washington Nationals

MLB statistics (through 2026 season)
- Win–loss record: 4–10
- Earned run average: 4.61
- Strikeouts: 112
- Stats at Baseball Reference

Teams
- Washington Nationals (2024, 2026–present)

Davidjohn Patrick Herz (born January 4, 2001) is an American professional baseball pitcher for the Washington Nationals of Major League Baseball (MLB). He made his MLB debut in 2024.

== Early life and amateur career ==
Herz played baseball, basketball and football at Terry Sanford High School in Fayetteville, North Carolina. Football was his favorite sport and Herz played quarterback for his high school. He considered walking on to the football team at North Carolina until Sam Howell committed to play for the Tar Heels. As a basketball player, he played on AAU teams with Dennis Smith Jr. He committed to play college baseball for the North Carolina Tar Heels. As a senior baseball player, he had an 8–1 record, 0.50 earned run average and .419 batting average.

== Professional career ==
=== Chicago Cubs ===
Herz was drafted by the Chicago Cubs in the eighth round (252nd overall) of the 2019 Major League Baseball draft. He signed with the Cubs for $500,000, forgoing his commitment to play college baseball at North Carolina.

Herz made his professional debut with the rookie–level Arizona League Cubs. He did not play in a game in 2020 due to the cancellation of the minor league season because of the COVID-19 pandemic. Herz started 2021 with the Single–A Myrtle Beach Pelicans and was later promoted to the High–A South Bend Cubs. Over twenty starts between the two affiliates, he went 4–4 with a 3.31 ERA and 131 strikeouts over 81 2/3 innings. Herz won the Vedie Himsl Cubs Minor League Pitcher of the Year award.

Herz split the 2022 campaign between South Bend and the Double–A Tennessee Smokies, accumulating a 3–6 record and 4.25 ERA with 141 strikeouts across 26 starts. He began the 2023 season with Tennessee, posting a 3.97 ERA with 80 strikeouts in 14 starts.

=== Washington Nationals ===
On July 31, 2023, Herz and Kevin Made were traded to the Washington Nationals in exchange for Jeimer Candelario. He finished the year with the Double–A Harrisburg Senators, compiling a 2.55 ERA with 53 strikeouts across eight starts.

On November 14, 2023, the Nationals added Herz to their 40-man roster to protect him from the Rule 5 draft. He was optioned to the Triple–A Rochester Red Wings to begin the 2024 season. On June 4, 2024, Herz was promoted to the major leagues for the first time. Herz recorded his first major league win in his third start, defeating the Marlins on June 15. With the start, he became the first pitcher since Stephen Strasburg, and the second since 1901, to record 13 strikeouts without walking a batter in one his first three major league appearances. In 19 starts during his rookie campaign, Herz compiled a 4-9 record and 4.16 ERA with 106 strikeouts across 88 2/3 innings pitched.

Herz was optioned to Triple-A Rochester to begin the 2025 season. On April 16, 2025, it was announced that Herz would undergo Tommy John surgery, ruling him out for the entirety of the season.

On June 23, 2026, amid his recovery, Herz was shut down due to a flexor muscle strain. He was activated from the injured list for his season debut on September 21.
