= Jake Irvin =

American baseball player (born 1997)

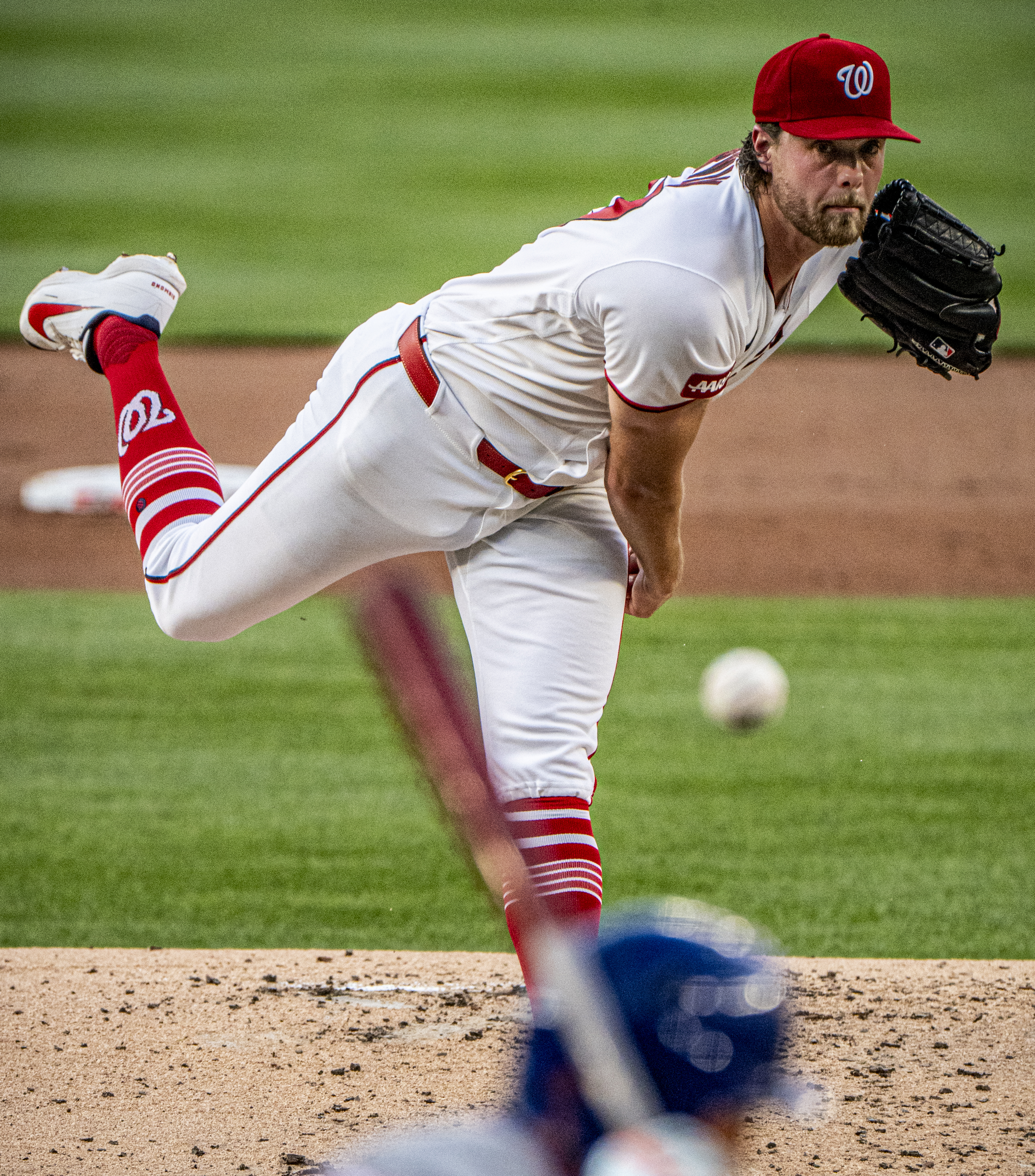
- Irvin with the Nationals in 2026

Washington Nationals – No. 27
- Pitcher
- Born: February 18, 1997 (age 29); Bloomington, Minnesota, U.S.
- Bats: Right Throws: Right

MLB debut
- May 3, 2023, for the Washington Nationals

MLB statistics (through 2026 season)
- Win–loss record: 24–44
- Earned run average: 5.03
- Strikeouts: 489
- Stats at Baseball Reference

Teams
- Washington Nationals (2023–present)

Jacob David Irvin (born February 18, 1997) is an American professional baseball pitcher for the Washington Nationals of Major League Baseball (MLB). He made his MLB debut in 2023.

== Career ==
Irvin attended Thomas Jefferson High School in Bloomington, Minnesota. He was drafted by the Minnesota Twins in the 37th round of the 2015 Major League Baseball draft, but did not sign and played college baseball at the University of Oklahoma.

Irvin was then drafted by the Washington Nationals in the fourth round, with the 131st overall selection of the 2018 Major League Baseball draft, and signed. In his first professional season, he recorded a 1.74 ERA across 11 games split between the rookie–level Gulf Coast League Nationals and Low–A Auburn Doubledays. In 2019, Irvin started 25 games for the Single–A Hagerstown Suns, registering an 8–8 record and 3.79 ERA with 113 strikeouts in 128 1/3 innings pitched.

Irvin did not play in a game in 2020 due to the cancellation of the minor league season because of the COVID-19 pandemic. Irvin missed the entire 2021 season as well after undergoing Tommy John surgery. He returned to action in 2022, making 24 starts split between the High–A Wilmington Blue Rocks and Double–A Harrisburg Senators. In 103 1/3 innings of work, he logged a 3.83 ERA and 107 strikeouts.

On November 15, 2022, the Nationals added Irvin to their 40-man roster to protect him from the Rule 5 draft. Irvin was optioned to the Triple-A Rochester Red Wings to begin the 2023 season. In five starts, Irvin registered a 2–2 record and 5.64 ERA with 20 strikeouts in 22 1/3 innings pitched. On May 2, 2023, the Nationals announced that Irvin would be promoted to the major leagues for the first time to start the following day against the Chicago Cubs. Irvin made his debut the following day, and recorded his first win on May 8 against the San Francisco Giants. He finished 2023 with a 3-7 record and an ERA of 4.61.

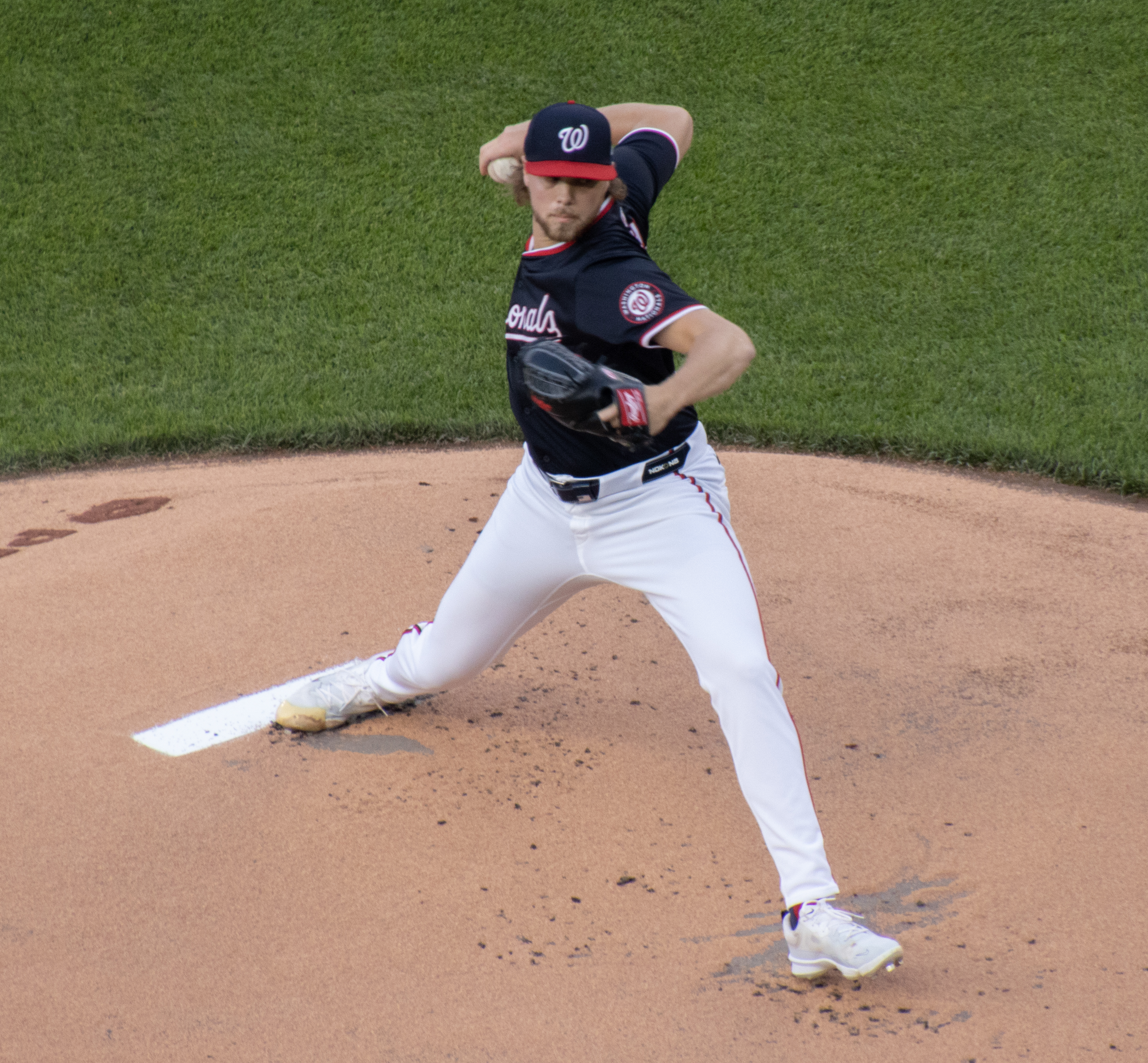
Irvin in 2024

In 2024, Irvin was tied for the league lead in starts, with 33, and finished the year with a 10-14 record and ERA of 4.41.

On May 24, 2026, Irvin was placed on the injured list due to a right shoulder strain. He was transferred to the 60–day injured list on July 10. Irvin was activated on July 30.

== Player profile ==
Irvin is listed at 6 feet 6 inches (1.98 m) and 200 pounds (91 kg).

== Personal life ==
Irvin is the son of Deb and Dave Irvin. He has three siblings: Sam Irvin, Steve Duncan and Matt Duncan.
