= Matt Cronin =

American baseball player (born 1997)

Free agent
- Relief pitcher
- Born: September 20, 1997 (age 28); Navarre, Florida, U.S.
- Bats: Left Throws: Left

Matthew G. Cronin (born September 20, 1997) is an American professional baseball pitcher who is a free agent.

== Career ==
=== Washington Nationals ===
Cronin was a reliever at the University of Arkansas in all 65 of his appearances in his collegiate career. The Washington Nationals drafted him in the fourth round of the 2019 Major League Baseball draft, and after he signed with Washington, he was assigned to the High-A Hagerstown Suns for the remainder of the 2019 season. He had a 0.82 ERA in his first professional season, striking out 41 batters in 22 innings. He was named to the Nationals' player pool during the COVID-19 pandemic–shortened 2020 season, although he was not called up to the major leagues.

Before the 2021 season, Cronin ranked as the organization's ninth-best prospect, according to Baseball America. The Nationals invited him to participate in major league spring training in 2021. After spring training, Cronin was assigned to the High-A Wilmington Blue Rocks to begin the 2021 season, although MLB Pipeline speculated that he could rise quickly in a relief role.

In 2022, Cronin split the year between the Double-A Harrisburg Senators and Triple-A Rochester Red Wings. In 48 relief appearances, he had a combined 2.42 ERA with 56 strikeouts in 52 innings of work. On November 15, 2022, the Nationals added Cronin to their 40-man roster to protect him from the Rule 5 draft.

Cronin was optioned to Rochester to begin the 2023 season. In 14 games, he logged a 5.02 ERA with 13 strikeouts across 14 1/3 innings pitched. On August 2, 2023, it was announced that Cronin would undergo season-ending surgery to repair a herniated disc in his back. Following the season on November 6, Cronin was designated for assignment after multiple players were activated from the injured list. He cleared waivers and was sent outright to Triple-A Rochester on November 10.

Cronin split the 2024 campaign with Harrisburg and Wilmington. He made 40 combined appearances out of the bullpen, registering a 1.42 ERA with 54 strikeouts and 10 saves across 44 1/3 innings pitched. After the season, he pitched for the Salt River Rafters in the Arizona Fall League.

=== Seattle Mariners ===
On December 11, 2024, the Seattle Mariners selected Cronin with the 61st overall pick of the minor league phase of the Rule 5 draft. He began the 2025 season with the Double-A Arkansas Travelers. In 15 total appearances split between Arkansas and the Triple-A Tacoma Rainiers, he logged a 2-0 record and 0.86 ERA with 21 strikeouts over 21 innings of work. Cronin elected free agency following the season on November 6.

== Pitching style ==
Cronin pitches left-handed, with a fastball up to 96 miles per hour (154 km/h) that plays up due to its high spin rate, along with a splitter and a curveball.
