= Nick Senzel =

American baseball player (born 1995)

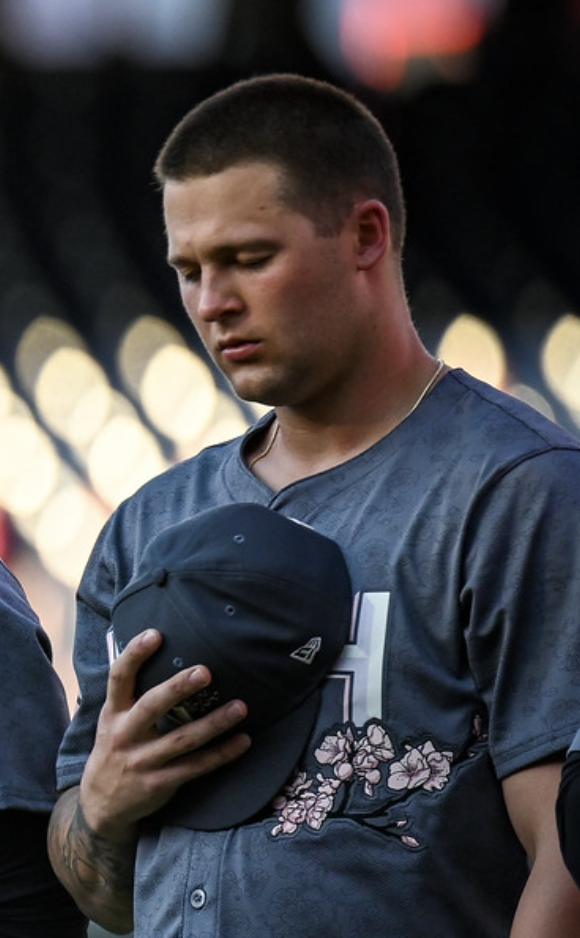
- Senzel with the Washington Nationals in 2024

Lexington Legends – No. 15
- Center fielder / Third baseman
- Born: June 29, 1995 (age 31); Atlanta, Georgia, U.S.
- Bats: Right Throws: Right

MLB debut
- May 3, 2019, for the Cincinnati Reds

MLB statistics (through 2024 season)
- Batting average: .232
- Home runs: 40
- Runs batted in: 143
- Stats at Baseball Reference

Teams
- Cincinnati Reds (2019–2023); Washington Nationals (2024); Chicago White Sox (2024)

Nicholas Peter Senzel (/sɛnˈzɛl/ sen-ZEL; born June 29, 1995) is an American professional baseball outfielder and third baseman for the Lexington Legends of the Atlantic League of Professional Baseball. He has previously played in Major League Baseball (MLB) for the Cincinnati Reds, Washington Nationals, and Chicago White Sox. Senzel attended the University of Tennessee, where he played college baseball for the Volunteers. The Reds selected him with the second overall pick in the 2016 MLB draft and he made his MLB debut in 2019.

== Amateur career ==
Senzel attended Farragut High School in Farragut, Tennessee. Playing for the school's varsity baseball team all four years, he was a starter since his sophomore season. As a junior, he recorded a .404 batting average, seven home runs, and 46 runs batted in (RBIs) while playing second base for the Admirals. Following his junior season, he signed his National Letter of Intent to join the Georgia baseball team. As a senior, he hit .386 with five home runs and 42 RBIs. After Georgia fired coach David Perno, he was granted a release from his letter of intent to the University of Georgia. On June 17, 2013, he committed to the University of Tennessee. Due to his late change to Tennessee, he played his first season in college as a walk-on.

As a freshman at the University of Tennessee in 2014, Senzel had a .315 batting average, a .419 on-base percentage (OBP), and a .420 SLG, with twelve doubles. He played in 53 of 54 games with 45 starts coming at designated hitter (DH) and eight at second base. He was named a freshman All-American by Louisville Slugger and Perfect Game. Following his freshman season at Tennessee, Senzel played collegiate summer baseball for the Mat-Su Miners of the Alaska Baseball League, where he batted 17-for-81 (.210) with three home runs and 13 RBIs.

As a sophomore in 2015, Senzel batted .325 with a .495 SLG, 4 home runs, and 28 RBIs. In the summer of 2015, he played for the Brewster Whitecaps of the Cape Cod Baseball League (CCBL), and received the league's MVP and Outstanding Pro Prospect awards after hitting .364 with four home runs and 33 RBIs. He was inducted into the CCBL Hall of Fame in 2024.

In the 2016 season as a junior, Senzel hit 25 doubles to lead the Southeastern Conference. Senzel was nominated for the Golden Spikes Award, which is awarded to the top collegiate player in the nation. He was also named a Perfect Game'/Rawlings First Team All-American, a Second Team All-American by Baseball America and Third Team All-America selection by both Louisville Slugger/Collegiate Baseball Newspaper and D1Baseball.

== Professional career ==
=== Cincinnati Reds ===
==== Minor leagues ====
Senzel was considered to be one of the best available players in the 2016 Major League Baseball draft, The Philadelphia Phillies, who had the first overall pick, scouted Senzel. Many baseball executives and scouts agreed that Senzel was the safest pick in the draft. He was also rated as the best hitter in the draft because of his abilities to hit gap-to-gap with power.

After the Phillies selected Mickey Moniak with the first overall selection, the Cincinnati Reds chose Senzel with the second overall pick. On June 13, 2016, Senzel signed with the Reds, receiving a $6.2 million signing bonus. Senzel made his professional debut with the Billings Mustangs of the Rookie-level Pioneer League, where he batted .152 with one double. He was promoted to the Dayton Dragons of the Single–A Midwest League on June 30. He hit .329 with seven home runs for Dayton.

Senzel began the 2017 season with the Daytona Tortugas of the High–A Florida State League, and was promoted to the Pensacola Blue Wahoos of the Double–A Southern League in June. He posted a combined .321 batting average with 14 home runs, 65 RBIs, and a .905 OPS in 119 games between Daytona and Pensacola.

Senzel began 2018 with the Louisville Bats of the Triple–A International League. On June 23, 2018, it was revealed that Senzel's 2018 season ended after he required surgery to repair a torn ligament on his right index finger. Upon his return from injury, Senzel told new Reds' manager David Bell, that he was preparing to play center field.

The Reds allowed Senzel to play center field in Spring Training with a chance to compete with Scott Schebler for the starting role. He had a .308 with a .300 on-base percentage and a .462 slugging percentage. Despite his performance, the Reds elected to send Senzel to minor league camp. Senzel's agent assumed that the service-time rules in baseball was the majority influence on the team's decision; if Senzel were to play 12 days in the minors before being promoted to the majors, the Reds would receive another year of club control. Just three days later, Senzel sprained his ankle during a minor league game. In eight games with Louisville, Senzel hit one home run and batted .257.

==== Major leagues ====
On May 3, 2019, Senzel was called up to the majors by the Reds. He made his major league debut that day at Great American Ballpark, going 1-for-5 with two strikeouts and two walks. Senzel's first hit was a slow-roller to third that he beat out off the San Francisco Giants' Tony Watson. Senzel hit his first major league home run on May 4, off Giants' Dereck Rodríguez. His second and third home runs came two days later at home against the Giants off Drew Pomeranz. Senzel finished the month of May with a .279 batting average, four home runs, 12 RBIs, and 12 walks.

On September 12, 2019, Senzel was placed on the injured list with a torn labrum. In 104 games of his first season in the Majors, Senzel batted .256 with 12 home runs, 20 doubles, and 42 RBIs.

In the following season, Senzel returned to the injured list on August 19 and missed 27 games in August and September for undisclosed reasons. During the pandemic-shortened season, Senzel batted .186/.247/.357 with two home runs and eight RBIs in 23 games.

On June 13, 2021, Senzel was placed on the 60-day injured list with left knee inflammation. On August 15, Senzel was activated from the injured list and optioned to Triple-A Louisville, but days later was returned to the injured list when it was discovered that Senzel's knee was not healthy enough for him to play. He was non-tendered and became a free agent on November 17, 2023.

=== Washington Nationals ===
On December 12, 2023, Senzel signed a one-year contract with the Washington Nationals. On March 28, 2024, Senzel suffered a broken right thumb while fielding ground balls during pregame. He was scratched from the Nationals' Opening Day lineup before playing in his first game with the club. In 64 games for Washington, he batted .209/.303/.359 with seven home runs and 18 RBI. Senzel was designated for assignment by the Nationals on July 5. He was released by the organization on July 11.

=== Chicago White Sox ===
On July 17, 2024, Senzel signed a major league contract with the Chicago White Sox. In 10 games for Chicago, he went 3–for–30 (.100). Senzel was designated for assignment by the White Sox on August 26. He elected free agency on August 28.

=== Tecolotes de los Dos Laredos ===
On March 11, 2025, Senzel signed with the Tecolotes de los Dos Laredos of the Mexican League. In six games for Dos Laredos, Senzel went 13-for-22 (.591) with three home runs and 10 RBI.

=== Los Angeles Dodgers ===
On April 25, 2025, Senzel signed a minor league contract with the Los Angeles Dodgers. He played three games for the Double–A Tulsa Drillers and 96 for the Triple–A Oklahoma City Comets, batting a combined .252 with 12 home runs and 66 RBI.

Senzel returned to Oklahoma City to begin the 2026 season, batting .179/.271/.274 with two home runs and 13 RBI across 23 appearances. He was released by the Dodgers organization on May 11.

=== Lexington Legends ===
On May 24, 2026, Senzel signed with the Lexington Legends of the Atlantic League of Professional Baseball.

== Personal life ==
Senzel is married to Emily. The couple got engaged on January 9, 2021. Their first child, a son was born on November 29, 2021. Their second child, a daughter was born on February 2, 2024.
