= 2021 St. Louis Cardinals season =

Major League Baseball season

2021 St. Louis Cardinals
- National League Wild Card
- League: National League
- Division: Central
- Ballpark: Busch Stadium
- City: St. Louis, Missouri
- Record: 90–72 (.556)
- Divisional place: 2nd
- Owners: William DeWitt Jr.
- General managers: Mike Girsch
- Managers: Mike Shildt
- Television: Bally Sports Midwest (Dan McLaughlin, Rick Horton, Jim Edmonds, Brad Thompson, Rick Ankiel)
- Radio: KMOX NewsRadio 1120; St. Louis Cardinals Radio Network (Mike Shannon, John Rooney, Rick Horton, Mike Claiborne)
- Stats: ESPN.com; Baseball Reference

The 2021 St. Louis Cardinals season was the 140th for the St. Louis Cardinals of the Major League Baseball, a franchise in St. Louis, Missouri. It also was the 130th season for the Cardinals in the National League, and their 16th at Busch Stadium III. They advanced to the playoffs but lost to the Los Angeles Dodgers in the NLWC Game. The season included a 17-game winning streak in September, which was the longest in franchise history. For the first time since 2012, Kolten Wong was not on the roster.

== Regular season ==
=== National League Central ===
NL Central
Team	W	L	Pct.	GB	Home	Road
Milwaukee Brewers	95	67	.586	—	45‍–‍36	50‍–‍31
St. Louis Cardinals	90	72	.556	5	45‍–‍36	45‍–‍36
Cincinnati Reds	83	79	.512	12	44‍–‍37	39‍–‍42
Chicago Cubs	71	91	.438	24	39‍–‍42	32‍–‍49
Pittsburgh Pirates	61	101	.377	34	37‍–‍44	24‍–‍57

=== National League playoff standings ===
Division leaders
Team	W	L	Pct.
San Francisco Giants	107	55	.660
Milwaukee Brewers	95	67	.586
Atlanta Braves	88	73	.547

Wild Card teams (Top 2 teams qualify for postseason)
Team	W	L	Pct.	GB
Los Angeles Dodgers	106	56	.654	+16
St. Louis Cardinals	90	72	.556	—
Cincinnati Reds	83	79	.512	7
Philadelphia Phillies	82	80	.506	8
San Diego Padres	79	83	.488	11
New York Mets	77	85	.475	13
Colorado Rockies	74	87	.460	15½
Chicago Cubs	71	91	.438	19
Miami Marlins	67	95	.414	23
Washington Nationals	65	97	.401	25
Pittsburgh Pirates	61	101	.377	29
Arizona Diamondbacks	52	110	.321	38

=== Record vs. opponents ===
2021 National League record Source: MLB Standings Grid – 2021
Team	AZ	ATL	CHC	CIN	COL	LAD	MIA	MIL	NYM	PHI	PIT	SD	SF	STL	WSH	AL
Arizona	—	3–4	2–4	5–1	9–10	3–16	2–5	1–6	1–5	4–3	4–2	8–11	2–17	1–6	3–4	4–16
Atlanta	4–3	—	5–2	4–3	2–4	2–4	11–8	3–3	10–9	10–9	4–3	4–2	3–3	6–1	14–5	6–14
Chicago	4–2	2–5	—	8–11	3–3	4–3	1–5	4–15	4–3	2–5	14–5	5–1	1–6	9–10	4–3	6–14
Cincinnati	1–5	3–4	11–8	—	5–2	3–3	5–2	9–10	3–3	4–2	13–6	1–6	1–6	10–9	5–2	9–11
Colorado	10–9	4–2	3–3	2–5	—	6–13	4–2	2–5	2–5	5–2	4–2	11–8	4–15	3–4	4–2	10–10
Los Angeles	16–3	4–2	3–4	3–3	13–6	—	3–4	4–3	6–1	4–2	6–0	12–7	9–10	4–3	7–0	12–8
Miami	5–2	8–11	5–1	2–5	2–4	4–3	—	3–3	9–10	10–9	2–5	3–4	3–4	0–6	8–11	3–17
Milwaukee	6–1	3–3	15–4	10–9	5–2	3–4	3–3	—	4–2	2–5	14–5	5–2	4–3	8–11	5–1	8–12
New York	5–1	9–10	3–4	3–3	5–2	1–6	10–9	2–4	—	9–10	3–4	4–3	1–5	2–5	11–8	9–11
Philadelphia	3–4	9–10	5–2	2–4	2–5	2–4	9–10	5–2	10–9	—	4–3	4–2	2–4	4–3	13–6	8–12
Pittsburgh	2–4	3–4	5–14	6–13	2–4	0–6	5–2	5–14	4–3	3–4	—	3–4	4–3	7–12	2–4	10–10
San Diego	11–8	2–4	1–5	6–1	8–11	7–12	4–3	2–5	3–4	2–4	4–3	—	8–11	3–3	4–3	14–6
San Francisco	17–2	3–3	6–1	6–1	15–4	10–9	4–3	3–4	5–1	4–2	3–4	11–8	—	2–4	5–2	13–7
St. Louis	6–1	1–6	10–9	9–10	4–3	3–4	6–0	11–8	5–2	3–4	12–7	3–3	4–2	—	2–4	11–9
Washington	4–3	5–14	3–4	2–5	2–4	0–7	11–8	1–5	8–11	6–13	4–2	3–4	2–5	4–2	—	10–10

=== Game log ===
2021 St. Louis Cardinals Game Log, 90–72 (Home: 45–36; Away: 45–36)
April: 14–12 (Home: 7–6; Away: 7–6)

#	Date	Opponent	Score	Win	Loss	Save	Attendance	Record	Box / L10
1	April 1	@ Reds	11–6	**Gallegos** (1–0)	Castillo (0–1)	—	12,695	1–0	W1
2	April 3	@ Reds	6–9	Mahle (1–0)	**Wainwright** (0–1)	—	12,213	1–1	L1
3	April 4	@ Reds	1–12	Hoffman (1–0)	**Martínez** (0–1)	—	11,629	1–2	L2
4	April 5	@ Marlins	4–1	**Ponce de Leon** (1–0)	Rogers (0–1)	**Reyes** (1)	4,605	2–2	W1
5	April 6	@ Marlins	4–2	**Helsley** (1–0)	Alcántara (0–1)	**Reyes** (2)	4,982	3–2	W2
6	April 7	@ Marlins	7–0	**Flaherty** (1–0)	López (0–1)	—	5,244	4–2	W3
7	April 8	Brewers	3–1	**Gallegos** (2–0)	Rasmussen (0–1)	**Reyes** (3)	13,328	5–2	W4
8	April 10	Brewers	5–9	Houser (1–1)	**Martínez** (0–2)	—	13,304	5–3	L1
9	April 11	Brewers	3–9	Anderson (1–1)	**Ponce de Leon** (1–1)	—	13,176	5–4	L2
10	April 12	Nationals	2–5	Finnegan (1–0)	**Gant** (0–1)	Hand (1)	12,894	5–5	L3
11	April 13	Nationals	14–3	**Flaherty** (2–0)	Strasburg (0–1)	—	12,714	6–5	W1
12	April 14	Nationals	0–6	Ross (1–0)	**Wainwright** (0–2)	—	13,206	6–6	L1
13	April 16	@ Phillies	2–9	Eflin (1–0)	**Martínez** (0–3)	—	10,842	6–7	L2
14	April 17	@ Phillies	9–4	**Helsley** (2–0)	Moore (0–1)	—	10,890	7–7	W1
15	April 18	@ Phillies	0–2	Nola (1–1)	**Gant** (0–2)	—	10,876	7–8	L1
16	April 19	@ Nationals	12–5	**Flaherty** (3–0)	Ross (1–1)	—	7,542	8–8	W1
17	April 20	@ Nationals	2–3	Hudson (2–0)	**Gallegos** (2–1)	Hand (2)	8,418	8–9	L1
18	April 21	@ Nationals	0–1	Scherzer (1–1)	**Martínez** (0–4)	Hand (3)	7,769	8–10	L2
19	April 23	Reds	5–4	**Kim** (1–0)	Gray (0–1)	**Reyes** (4)	13,196	9–10	W1
20	April 24	Reds	2–0	**Gant** (1–2)	Miley (2–2)	**Gallegos** (1)	13,176	10–10	W2
21	April 25	Reds	5–2	**Flaherty** (4–0)	Castillo (1–2)	**Reyes** (5)	13,348	11–10	W3
22	April 26	Phillies	1–2	Wheeler (2–2)	**Wainwright** (0–3)	Neris (4)	12,866	11–11	L1
23	April 27	Phillies	5–2	**Martínez** (1–4)	Eflin (1–1)	**Reyes** (6)	12,895	12–11	W1
24	April 28	Phillies	3–5	Kintzler (1–0)	**Cabrera** (0–1)	Neris (5)	12,701	12–12	L1
25	April 29	Phillies	4–3 (10)	**Reyes** (1–0)	Hale (0–1)	—	13,159	13–12	W1
26	April 30	@ Pirates	7–3	**Gant** (2–2)	Brubaker (2–2)	—	5,953	14–12	W2

May: 16–12 (Home: 8–4; Away: 8–8)

#	Date	Opponent	Score	Win	Loss	Save	Attendance	Record	Box / L10
27	May 1	@ Pirates	12–5	**Flaherty** (5–0)	Cahill (1–3)	—	7,331	15–12	W3
28	May 2	@ Pirates	3–0	**Martínez** (2–4)	Crowe (0–1)	**Reyes** (7)	7,343	16–12	W4
29	May 3	Mets	6–5	**Wainwright** (1–3)	Lucchesi (0–2)	**Reyes** (8)	12,686	17–12	W5
—	May 4	Mets	Postponed (rain, makeup May 5)						
30	May 5 (1)	Mets	4–1 (7)	**Helsley** (3–0)	Stroman (3–3)	**Reyes** (9)	N/A	18–12	W6
31	May 5 (2)	Mets	2–7 (7)	Yamamoto (1–0)	**Oviedo** (0–1)	—	13,187	18–13	L1
32	May 6	Mets	1–4	Walker (2–1)	**Gant** (2–3)	Díaz (4)	12,939	18–14	L2
33	May 7	Rockies	5–0	**Flaherty** (6–0)	Gomber (2–4)	—	13,435	19–14	W1
34	May 8	Rockies	9–8	**Martínez** (3–4)	Gonzalez (1–1)	**Reyes** (10)	13,390	20–14	W2
35	May 9	Rockies	2–0	**Wainwright** (2–3)	Márquez (1–4)	**Helsley** (1)	13,380	21–14	W3
36	May 11	@ Brewers	6–1 (11)	**Reyes** (2–0)	Boxberger (0–1)	—	10,595	22–14	W4
37	May 12	@ Brewers	1–4	Williams (1–0)	**Helsley** (3–1)	Hader (8)	10,226	22–15	L1
38	May 13	@ Brewers	2–0	**Flaherty** (7–0)	Burnes (2–3)	**Reyes** (11)	10,554	23–15	W1
39	May 14	@ Padres	4–5	Musgrove (3–4)	**Oviedo** (0–2)	Melancon (13)	15,250	23–16	L1
40	May 15	@ Padres (FS1)	3–13	Díaz (2–0)	**Wainwright** (2–4)	—	15,250	23–17	L2
41	May 16	@ Padres (ESPN)	3–5	Lamet (1–0)	**Kim** (1–1)	Melancon (14)	15,250	23–18	L3
42	May 18	Pirates	5–2	**Gant** (3–3)	Brubaker (3–3)	**Reyes** (12)	14,005	24–18	W1
43	May 19	Pirates	8–5	**Flaherty** (8–0)	Cahill (1–5)	**Reyes** (13)	14,677	25–18	W2
44	May 21	Cubs	3–12	Hendricks (4–4)	**Helsley** (3–2)	—	24,282	25–19	L1
45	May 22	Cubs (Fox)	2–1	**Cabrera** (1–1)	Alzolay (2–4)	**Reyes** (14)	26,027	26–19	W1
46	May 23	Cubs (ESPN)	1–2 (10)	Kimbrel (1–2)	**Reyes** (2–1)	—	24,082	26–20	L1
47	May 24	@ White Sox	1–5	Lynn (5–1)	**Kim** (1–2)	—	14,629	26–21	L2
48	May 25	@ White Sox	3–8	Giolito (4–4)	**Flaherty** (8–1)	Hendriks (10)	16,380	26–22	L3
49	May 26	@ White Sox	4–0	**Gant** (4–3)	Rodón (5–2)	—	14,791	27–22	W1
50	May 27	@ Diamondbacks	5–4 (10)	**Reyes** (3–1)	Crichton (0–4)	**Ponce de Leon** (1)	8,951	28–22	W2
51	May 28	@ Diamondbacks	8–6	**Woodford** (1–0)	Bumgarner (4–5)	**Ponce de Leon** (2)	11,581	29–22	W3
52	May 29	@ Diamondbacks	7–4	**Wainwright** (3–4)	Frankoff (0–2)	**Reyes** (15)	17,834	30–22	W4
53	May 30	@ Diamondbacks	2–9	Peacock (2–1)	**Kim** (1–3)	Smith (1)	16,681	30–23	L1
54	May 31	@ Dodgers	4–9	Bauer (6–3)	**Helsley** (3–3)	—	18,071	30–24	L2

June: 10–17 (Home: 8–8; Away: 2–9)

#	Date	Opponent	Score	Win	Loss	Save	Attendance	Record	Box / L10
55	June 1	@ Dodgers	3–2	**Gallegos** (3–1)	Treinen (1–2)	**Reyes** (16)	15,683	31–24	W1
56	June 2	@ Dodgers	3–14	Buehler (4–0)	**Martínez** (3–5)	—	15,889	31–25	L1
57	June 3	Reds	2–4	Gutiérrez (1–1)	**Wainwright** (3–5)	Sims (4)	15,327	31–26	L2
58	June 4	Reds	4–6	Castillo (2–8)	**Kim** (1–4)	Feliz (1)	22,756	31–27	L3
59	June 5	Reds	2–5	Mahle (5–2)	**Helsley** (3–4)	Sims (5)	23,365	31–28	L4
60	June 6	Reds	7–8	Hembree (1–1)	**Reyes** (3–2)	Sims (6)	21,152	31–29	L5
61	June 8	Indians	1–10	Bieber (7–3)	**Martínez** (3–6)	—	16,178	31–30	L6
62	June 9	Indians	8–2	**Wainwright** (4–5)	Mejía (0–1)	—	16,331	32–30	W1
63	June 11	@ Cubs	5–8	Nance (1–0)	**Cabrera** (1–2)	Kimbrel (16)	35,112	32–31	L1
64	June 12	@ Cubs (Fox)	2–7	Hendricks (8–4)	**Gant** (4–4)	Kimbrel (17)	39,095	32–32	L2
65	June 13	@ Cubs (ESPN)	0–2	Davies (4–3)	**Martínez** (3–7)	Kimbrel (18)	35,225	32–33	L3
66	June 14	Marlins	4–2	**Gallegos** (4–1)	Floro (2–4)	**Reyes** (17)	24,281	33–33	W1
67	June 15	Marlins	2–1	**Reyes** (4–2)	García (3–5)	—	24,736	34–33	W2
68	June 16	Marlins	1–0	**Helsley** (4–4)	Alcántara (4–6)	—	24,682	35–33	W3
69	June 17	@ Braves	0–4	Morton (6–3)	**Gant** (4–5)	—	33,412	35–34	L1
70	June 18	@ Braves	1–9	Fried (4–4)	**Martínez** (3–8)	—	40,377	35–35	L2
—	June 19	@ Braves	Postponed (rain, makeup June 20)						
71	June 20 (1)	@ Braves	9–1 (7)	**Wainwright** (5–5)	Wilson (2–3)	—	33,781	36–35	W1
72	June 20 (2)	@ Braves (ESPN)	0–1 (7)	Smyly (4–3)	**Kim** (1–5)	Smith (13)	36,977	36–36	L1
73	June 22	@ Tigers	2–8	Funkhouser (1–0)	**Oviedo** (0–3)	—	13,492	36–37	L2
74	June 23	@ Tigers	2–6	Manning (1–1)	**Gant** (4–6)	—	13,263	36–38	L3
75	June 24	Pirates	2–8	Kuhl (2–4)	**Martínez** (3–9)	—	33,254	36–39	L4
76	June 25	Pirates	4–5	Crowe (1–4)	**Woodford** (1–1)	Rodríguez (10)	34,812	36–40	L5
77	June 26	Pirates	3–1	**Wainwright** (6–5)	Brubaker (4–7)	**Reyes** (18)	33,058	37–40	W1
78	June 27	Pirates	2–7	Kranick (1–0)	**Oviedo** (0–4)	—	25,163	37–41	L1
79	June 28	Diamondbacks	7–1	**Gallegos** (5–1)	Young (2–6)	—	27,175	38–41	W1
80	June 29	Diamondbacks	3–2	**Martínez** (4–9)	Smith (2–4)	**Reyes** (19)	28,740	39–41	W2
81	June 30	Diamondbacks	7–4	**Kim** (2–5)	Smith (1–4)	**Reyes** (20)	27,235	40–41	W3

July: 12–11 (Home: 6–3; Away: 6–8)

#	Date	Opponent	Score	Win	Loss	Save	Attendance	Record	Box / L10
82	July 1	@ Rockies	2–5	Bard (4–4)	**Gallegos** (5–2)	—	30,410	40–42	L1
83	July 2	@ Rockies	9–3 (10)	**Reyes** (5–2)	Almonte (1–2)	—	47,224	41–42	W1
84	July 3	@ Rockies	2–3	Chacín (2–1)	**Cabrera** (1–3)	Bard (12)	48,182	41–43	L1
85	July 4	@ Rockies	2–3	Lawrence (1–0)	**Reyes** (5–3)	—	36,891	41–44	L2
86	July 5	@ Giants	5–3	**Kim** (3–5)	Gausman (8–3)	—	32,644	42–44	W1
87	July 6	@ Giants	6–5	**Wainwright** (7–5)	Cueto (6–5)	**Miller** (1)	18,785	43–44	W2
88	July 7	@ Giants	2–5	Wood (8–3)	**Oviedo** (0–5)	McGee (17)	19,067	43–45	L1
89	July 9	@ Cubs	5–10	Hendricks (11–4)	**LeBlanc** (0–2)	—	36,192	43–46	L2
90	July 10	@ Cubs	6–0	**Kim** (4–5)	Davies (5–6)	—	39,368	44–46	W1
—	July 11	@ Cubs	Postponed (rain, makeup September 24)						
**91st All-Star Game in Denver, Colorado**
91	July 16	Giants	2–7	Jackson (1–0)	**Wainwright** (7–6)	—	33,743	44–47	L1
92	July 17	Giants	3–1	**Kim** (5–5)	DeSclafani (10–4)	**Reyes** (21)	40,489	45–47	W1
93	July 18	Giants	2–1	**Cabrera** (2–3)	Brebbia (0–1)	**Reyes** (22)	29,425	46–47	W2
94	July 19	Cubs	8–3	**Woodford** (2–1)	Mills (4–3)	—	38,199	47–47	W2
95	July 20	Cubs	6–7	Maples (1–0)	**Reyes** (5–4)	Kimbrel (22)	35,402	47–48	L1
96	July 21	Cubs	3–2 (10)	**McFarland** (1–0)	Kimbrel (1–3)	—	37,008	48–48	L1
97	July 22	Cubs	3–2	**Kim** (6–5)	Alzolay (4–10)	**Reyes** (23)	41,412	49–48	W1
98	July 23	@ Reds	5–6	Brach (1–1)	**Gallegos** (5–3)	Hembree (7)	30,605	49–49	L1
99	July 24	@ Reds	3–5	Castillo (4–10)	**Woodford** (2–2)	Hembree (8)	33,489	49–50	L2
100	July 25	@ Reds	10–6	**Helsley** (5–4)	Gray (2–6)	—	21,947	50–50	W1
101	July 27	@ Indians	4–2	**Wainwright** (8–6)	Shaw (3–5)	**Reyes** (24)	19,480	51–50	W2
102	July 28	@ Indians	2–7	Plesac (6–3)	**Kim** (6–6)	—	19,927	51–51	W2
103	July 30	Twins	5–1	**Helsley** (6–4)	Duffey (2–3)	—	34,036	52–51	W3
104	July 31	Twins	1–8	Alcalá (3–5)	**Woodford** (2–3)	—	33,432	52–52	L1

August: 15–11 (Home: 6–9; Away: 9–2)

#	Date	Opponent	Score	Win	Loss	Save	Attendance	Record	Box / L10
105	August 1	Twins	7–3	**Wainwright** (9–6)	Pineda (4–6)	—	28,975	53–52	W1
106	August 3	Braves	1–6	Fried (8–7)	**Lester** (3–6)	—	31,509	53–53	L1
107	August 4	Braves	4–7	Martin (1–3)	**Gallegos** (5–4)	Smith (22)	32,205	53–54	L2
108	August 5	Braves	4–8	Santana (1–0)	**Gallegos** (5–5)	—	30,549	53–55	L3
109	August 6	Royals	4–2	**Wainwright** (10–6)	Minor (8–10)	**Reyes** (25)	29,090	54–55	W1
110	August 7	Royals	5–2	**García** (1–0)	Keller (7–11)	**Gallegos** (2)	36,615	55–55	W2
111	August 8	Royals	5–6	Barlow (4–3)	**Reyes** (5–5)	Lovelady (1)	31,943	55–56	L1
112	August 10	@ Pirates	4–1	**Happ** (6–6)	Brault (0–1)	**Reyes** (26)	10,056	56–56	W1
113	August 11	@ Pirates	4–0	**Wainwright** (11–6)	Crowe (3–7)	—	8,548	57–56	W2
114	August 12	@ Pirates	7–6	**McFarland** (2–0)	Brubaker (4–12)	**Reyes** (27)	8,676	58–56	W3
115	August 13	@ Royals	6–0	**Flaherty** (9–1)	Minor (8–11)	—	30,620	59–56	W4
116	August 14	@ Royals	9–4	**Lester** (4–6)	Keller (7–13)	—	35,784	60–56	W5
117	August 15	@ Royals	7–2	**Happ** (7–6)	Bubic (3–6)	—	18,317	61–56	W6
118	August 17	Brewers	0–2	Burnes (8–4)	**Wainwright** (11–7)	Hader (24)	28,058	61–57	L1
119	August 18	Brewers	4–6 (10)	Hader (4–2)	**Reyes** (5–6)	Williams (3)	25,938	61–58	L2
120	August 19	Brewers	8–4	**Fernández** (1–0)	Woodruff (7–7)	—	27,545	62–58	W1
121	August 20	Pirates	0–4	Keller (4–10)	**Mikolas** (0–1)	—	28,406	62–59	L1
122	August 21	Pirates	4–5	Shreve (2–1)	**Cabrera** (2–4)	Bednar (1)	30,205	62–60	L2
123	August 22	Pirates	3–0	**Wainwright** (12–7)	Brault (0–2)	**Reyes** (28)	34,431	63–60	W1
124	August 24	Tigers	3–4	Mize (7–6)	**Flaherty** (9–2)	Fulmer (8)	28,185	63–61	L1
125	August 25	Tigers	3–2 (10)	**McFarland** (3–0)	Fulmer (5–6)	—	24,304	64–61	W1
126	August 26	@ Pirates	7–11	Kuhl (4–6)	**Cabrera** (2–5)	—	8,618	64–62	L1
127	August 27	@ Pirates	4–3	**Happ** (8–6)	Peters (0–2)	**Reyes** (29)	12,662	65–62	W1
128	August 28	@ Pirates	13–0	**Wainwright** (13–7)	Brault (0–3)	—	20,043	66–62	W2
129	August 29	@ Pirates	3–4	Stratton (5–0)	**Reyes** (5–7)	—	10,290	66–63	L1
130	August 30	@ Reds	3–1	**Lester** (5–6)	Castillo (7–14)	**Gallegos** (3)	10,773	67–63	W1
—	August 31	@ Reds	Postponed (rain, makeup September 1)						

September: 22–7 (Home: 9–4; Away: 13–3)

#	Date	Opponent	Score	Win	Loss	Save	Attendance	Record	Box / L10
131	September 1 (1)	@ Reds	5–4 (7)	**Cabrera** (3–5)	Miley (11–5)	**Gallegos** (4)	10,365	68–63	W2
132	September 1 (2)	@ Reds	2–12 (7)	Gray (7–6)	**Happ** (8–7)	—	10,892	68–64	L1
133	September 3	@ Brewers	15–4	**Wainwright** (14–7)	Peralta (9–4)	—	23,987	69–64	W1
134	September 4	@ Brewers	0–4	Houser (8–6)	**Kim** (6–7)	—	33,439	69–65	L1
135	September 5	@ Brewers	5–6	Sánchez (2–0)	**Reyes** (5–8)	—	33,845	69–66	L2
136	September 6	Dodgers	1–5	Scherzer (13–4)	**Mikolas** (0–2)	—	43,575	69–67	L3
137	September 7	Dodgers	2–7	Vesia (3–1)	**Happ** (8–8)	—	34,500	69–68	L4
138	September 8	Dodgers	5–4	**Wainwright** (15–7)	White (1–3)	**Gallegos** (5)	35,566	70–68	W1
139	September 9	Dodgers	2–1	**Reyes** (6–8)	Bickford (3–2)	**Gallegos** (6)	31,173	71–68	W2
140	September 10	Reds	2–4	Lorenzen (1–2)	**McFarland** (3–1)	Givens (7)	29,597	71–69	L1
141	September 11	Reds	6–4	**Reyes** (7–8)	Sims (5–3)	**Gallegos** (7)	33,404	72–69	W1
142	September 12	Reds	2–0	**Happ** (9–8)	Gray (7–7)	**Gallegos** (8)	32,872	73–69	W2
143	September 13	@ Mets	7–0	**Wainwright** (16–7)	Hill (6–7)	—	19,057	74–69	W3
144	September 14	@ Mets	7–6 (11)	**Reyes** (8–8)	Reed (0–1)	**Kim** (1)	21,825	75–69	W4
145	September 15	@ Mets	11–4	**Lester** (6–6)	Megill (3–5)	—	21,001	76–69	W5
146	September 17	Padres	8–2	**Mikolas** (1–2)	Velasquez (3–7)	—	30,937	77–69	W6
147	September 18	Padres	3–2	**Miller** (1–0)	Pagán (4–2)	**Gallegos** (9)	40,626	78–69	W7
148	September 19	Padres	8–7	**Reyes** (9–8)	Arrieta (5–14)	**Gallegos** (10)	35,326	79–69	W8
149	September 20	@ Brewers	5–2	**Lester** (7–6)	Peralta (9–5)	**García** (1)	28,291	80–69	W9
150	September 21	@ Brewers	2–1	**Woodford** (3–3)	Woodruff (9–10)	**Gallegos** (11)	30,475	81–69	W10
151	September 22	@ Brewers	10–2	**Mikolas** (2–2)	Anderson (4–9)	—	29,635	82–69	W11
152	September 23	@ Brewers	8–5	**McFarland** (4–1)	Ashby (3–1)	**Gallegos** (12)	30,804	83–69	W12
153	September 24 (1)	@ Cubs	8–5 (7)	**Reyes** (10–8)	Steele (3–4)	**Gallegos** (13)	29,030	84–69	W13
154	September 24 (2)	@ Cubs	12–4 (7)	**Hudson** (1–0)	Davies (6–12)	—	35,020	85–69	W14
155	September 25	@ Cubs	8–5	**Kim** (7–7)	Heuer (7–3)	—	32,918	86–69	W15
156	September 26	@ Cubs	4–2	**Cabrera** (4–5)	Heuer (7–4)	**Gallegos** (14)	26,547	87–69	W16
157	September 28	Brewers	6–2	**Wainwright** (17–7)	Gustave (1–1)	—	35,726	88–69	W17
158	September 29	Brewers	0–4	Houser (10–6)	**Mikolas** (2–3)	—	35,283	88–70	L1
159	September 30	Brewers	4–3	**Happ** (10–8)	Sánchez (2–1)	**García** (2)	29,161	89–70	W1

October: 1–2 (Home: 1–2; Away: 0–0)

#	Date	Opponent	Score	Win	Loss	Save	Attendance	Record	Box / L10
160	October 1	Cubs	4–3	**Gallegos** (6–5)	Nance (1–1)	—	41,618	90–70	W2
161	October 2	Cubs (Fox)	5–6	Adam (1–0)	**García** (1–1)	Wick (5)	45,239	90–71	L1
162	October 3	Cubs	2–3 (7)	Biagini (1–0)	**Woodford** (3–4)	—	46,525	90–72	L2

Legend: = Win = Loss = Postponement
Bold = Cardinals team member

=== Awards ===
The Cardinals became the first team to have five players win Gold Glove Awards: first baseman Paul Goldschmidt, second baseman Tommy Edman, third baseman Nolan Arenado, left fielder Tyler O'Neill and center fielder Harrison Bader.

=== Winning streak ===
In September, the Cardinals went on a franchise record 17-game winning streak. The streak started with two wins in St. Louis against the Cincinnati Reds, followed by three-game sweeps of the New York Mets and San Diego Padres, and continued with four-game sweeps of the Milwaukee Brewers and Chicago Cubs. The Cardinals won their 17th consecutive game in St. Louis against Milwaukee, marking the longest win streak in the National League since 1937 and longest in the MLB since the 2017 Cleveland Indians. The streak, which began on September 11, came to an end on September 29 with a 4–0 loss to the Brewers. The 17 straight wins for the Cardinals broke the previous franchise record of 14 consecutive wins in 1935. This 17-game stretch vaulted the Cardinals into a commanding lead in the NL Wild Card race, and helped them reach the 2021 MLB playoffs.

=== Gold Gloves ===
On defense, the Cardinals were the first team in MLB history to win five Gold Glove Awards. The five National League Gold Glove winners for the Cardinals were first baseman Paul Goldschmidt, second baseman Tommy Edman, third baseman Nolan Arenado, center fielder Harrison Bader, and left fielder Tyler O'Neill. Arenado won his fifth National League Platinum Glove Award in a row and first as a Cardinal, which is given to the best fielder in each respective league.

=== Rookie of the Year ===
St. Louis outfielder, Dylan Carlson was a nominee for the 2021 National League Rookie of the Year Award. Carlson finished third in votes for the NL Rookie of the Year, behind Trevor Rogers of the Miami Marlins and Jonathan India of the Cincinnati Reds. India won the Rookie of the Year, playing infield for a division rival of the Cardinals. In his first full season with the team, Carlson played in 149 games and hit for an average of .266 with 18 home runs.

=== Manager of the Year ===
Cardinal manager, Mike Shildt, was named a finalist for the 2021 National League Manager of the Year Award. Shildt received one first-place vote, and finished third overall behind San Francisco Giants manager, Gabe Kapler, and Craig Counsell of the Milwaukee Brewers. Kapler, who won the award, led his team to the best record in the MLB, while Counsell's Brewers won the NL Central division over the Cardinals. Shildt managed the Cardinals to a 90–72 record and playoff berth. This was Shildt's second nomination for NL Manager of the Year, having won the award in 2019.

== Roster ==
2021 St. Louis Cardinals
Roster
Pitchers: 92 Génesis Cabrera; 53 Brandon Dickson; 61 Seth Elledge; 44 Junior Fernández; 22 Jack Flaherty; 62 Bernardo Flores Jr.; 65 Giovanny Gallegos; 53 John Gant; 66 Luis García; 34 J. A. Happ; 56 Ryan Helsley; 12 Jordan Hicks; 43 Dakota Hudson; 33 Kwang Hyun Kim; 49 Wade LeBlanc; 31 Jon Lester; 18 Carlos Martínez; 62 T. J. McFarland; 39 Miles Mikolas; 21 Andrew Miller; 60 Justin Miller; 59 Johan Oviedo; 32 Daniel Ponce de Leon; 77 Roel Ramírez; 29 Alex Reyes; 55 Ángel Rondón; 70 Brandon Waddell; 50 Adam Wainwright; 30 Tyler Webb; 38 Kodi Whitley; 40 Jake Woodford	Catchers: 7 Andrew Knizner; 4 Yadier Molina; 41 Ali Sánchez; Infielders: 28 Nolan Arenado; 13 Matt Carpenter; 11 Paul DeJong; 19 Tommy Edman; 46 Paul Goldschmidt; 67 Max Moroff; 34 John Nogowski; 64 José Rondón; 63 Edmundo Sosa	Outfielders: 48 Harrison Bader; 3 Dylan Carlson; 0 Austin Dean; 36 Scott Hurst; 68 Lars Nootbaar; 27 Tyler O'Neill; 35 Lane Thomas; 26 Justin Williams	Manager: 8 Mike Shildt; Coaches: 54 Jeff Albert (hitting); 90 Dusty Blake (pitching strategist); 82 Stubby Clapp (first base); 88 Patrick Elkins (run production); 72 Bryan Eversgerd (bullpen); 58 Jobel Jiménez (assistant hitting); 31,35 Mike Maddux (pitching); 37 Oliver Marmol (bench); 51 Willie McGee (assistant coach); 94 Jamie Pogue (bullpen catcher); 76 Kleininger Teran (bullpen catcher); 75 Ron 'Pop' Warner (third base)

== Player stats ==
=== Batting ===
Note: G = Games played; AB = At bats; R = Runs; H = Hits; 2B = Doubles; 3B = Triples; HR = Home runs; RBI = Runs batted in; SB = Stolen bases; BB = Walks; AVG = Batting average; SLG = Slugging average

Player	G	AB	R	H	2B	3B	HR	RBI	SB	BB	AVG	SLG
Tommy Edman	159	641	91	168	41	3	11	56	30	38	.262	.387
Paul Goldschmidt	158	603	102	177	36	2	31	99	12	67	.294	.514
Nolan Arenado	157	593	81	151	34	3	34	105	2	50	.255	.494
Dylan Carlson	149	542	79	144	31	4	18	65	2	57	.266	.437
Tyler O'Neill	138	482	89	138	26	2	34	80	15	38	.286	.560
Yadier Molina	121	440	45	111	19	0	11	66	3	24	.252	.370
Harrison Bader	103	367	45	98	21	1	16	50	9	27	.267	.460
Paul DeJong	113	356	44	70	10	1	19	45	4	35	.197	.390
Edmundo Sosa	113	288	39	78	8	4	6	27	4	17	.271	.389
Matt Carpenter	130	207	18	35	11	1	3	21	2	35	.169	.275
Andrew Knizner	63	161	18	28	7	0	1	9	0	20	.174	.236
Justin Williams	51	119	10	19	0	0	4	11	0	17	.160	.261
Lars Nootbaar	58	109	15	26	3	1	5	15	2	13	.239	.422
José Rondón	63	80	13	21	3	0	3	9	2	8	.263	.413
Lane Thomas	32	48	2	5	1	0	0	1	2	10	.104	.125
Austin Dean	22	30	5	7	2	0	1	7	0	6	.233	.400
John Nogowski	19	18	2	1	0	0	0	0	0	1	.056	.056
Max Moroff	6	16	0	1	0	0	0	1	0	0	.063	.063
Scott Hurst	7	5	0	0	0	0	0	0	0	0	.000	.000
Ali Sánchez	2	4	0	2	2	0	0	0	0	0	.500	1.000
Pitcher totals	162	242	8	23	6	0	1	11	0	15	.095	.132
Team totals	162	5351	706	1303	261	22	198	678	89	478	.244	.412

=== Pitching ===
Note: W = Wins; L = Losses; ERA = Earned run average; G = Games pitched; GS = Games started; SV = Saves; IP = Innings pitched; H = Hits allowed; R = Runs allowed; ER = Earned runs allowed; BB = Walks allowed; SO = Strikeouts

Player	W	L	ERA	G	GS	SV	IP	H	R	ER	BB	SO
Adam Wainwright	17	7	3.05	32	32	0	206.1	168	72	70	50	174
Kwang-hyun Kim	7	7	3.46	27	21	1	106.2	98	46	41	39	80
Carlos Martínez	4	9	6.23	16	16	0	82.1	77	58	57	36	57
Giovanny Gallegos	6	5	3.02	73	0	14	80.1	51	28	27	20	95
Jack Flaherty	9	2	3.22	17	15	0	78.1	57	35	28	26	85
John Gant	4	6	3.42	25	14	0	76.1	64	32	29	56	56
Alex Reyes	10	8	3.24	69	0	29	72.1	46	32	26	52	95
Génesis Cabrera	4	5	3.73	71	0	0	70.0	52	31	29	36	77
Jake Woodford	3	4	3.99	26	8	0	67.2	66	32	30	25	50
Jon Lester	4	1	4.36	12	12	0	66.0	68	34	32	26	40
Johan Oviedo	0	5	4.91	14	13	0	62.1	61	39	34	37	51
J. A. Happ	5	2	4.00	11	11	0	54.0	52	24	24	17	45
Ryan Helsley	6	4	4.56	51	0	1	47.1	40	24	24	27	47
Miles Mikolas	2	3	4.23	9	9	0	44.2	43	24	21	11	31
Wade LeBlanc	0	1	3.61	12	8	0	42.1	45	17	17	16	23
T. J. McFarland	4	1	2.56	38	0	0	38.2	32	11	11	9	21
Andrew Miller	0	0	4.75	40	0	0	36.0	41	19	19	16	40
Daniel Ponce de Leon	1	1	6.21	24	2	2	33.1	32	24	23	22	24
Luis García	1	1	3.24	34	0	2	33.1	25	12	12	8	34
Kodi Whitley	0	0	2.49	25	0	0	25.1	15	8	7	12	27
Junior Fernández	1	0	5.66	18	0	0	20.2	25	13	13	15	15
Tyler Webb	0	0	13.22	22	0	0	16.1	22	26	24	19	14
Justin Miller	1	0	4.50	18	0	1	16.0	15	8	8	5	9
Seth Elledge	0	0	4.63	11	0	0	11.2	13	6	6	7	11
Jordan Hicks	0	0	5.40	10	0	0	10.0	5	6	6	10	10
Dakota Hudson	1	0	2.08	2	1	0	8.2	7	2	2	1	6
Brandon Waddell	0	0	4.15	4	0	0	4.1	4	2	2	5	6
Brandon Dickson	0	0	13.50	2	0	0	2.0	5	3	3	0	1
Ángel Rondón	0	0	0.00	2	0	0	2.0	1	0	0	1	1
Matt Carpenter	0	0	0.00	1	0	0	1.1	2	0	0	0	0
Roel Ramírez	0	0	81.00	1	0	0	0.1	1	3	3	2	0
Bernardo Flores	0	0	inf	1	0	0	0.0	1	1	1	2	0
Team totals	90	72	3.98	162	162	50	1417.0	1234	672	626	608	1225

== Postseason ==
=== Game log ===
2021 Postseason (0–1)
National League Wild Card Game (0–1)

Game	Date	Opponent	Score	Win	Loss	Save	Attendance	Record
1	October 6	@ Dodgers	1–3	Jansen (1–0)	McFarland (0–1)	—	53,193	0–1

=== Postseason rosters ===
Playoff rosters
National League Wild Card Game

- Pitchers: 21 Andrew Miller 22 Jack Flaherty 29 Alex Reyes 33 Kwang Hyun Kim 38 Kodi Whitley 39 Miles Mikolas 43 Dakota Hudson 50 Adam Wainwright 62 T. J. McFarland 65 Giovanny Gallegos 66 Luis García 92 Génesis Cabrera
- Catchers: 4 Yadier Molina 7 Andrew Knizner
- Infielders: 11 Paul DeJong 13 Matt Carpenter 19 Tommy Edman 28 Nolan Arenado 46 Paul Goldschmidt 63 Edmundo Sosa 64 José Rondón 77 Juan Yepez
- Outfielders: 3 Dylan Carlson 27 Tyler O'Neill 48 Harrison Bader 68 Lars Nootbaar

== Minor league system and first-year player draft ==
=== Teams ===
Level	Team	League	Division	Manager	W–L/Stats	Standing	Refs
Triple-A	Memphis Redbirds	Triple-A East	Southeast	Ben Johnson	61–67	5th of 7	
Double-A	Springfield Cardinals	Double-A Central	North	José Leger	45–75	5th of 5	
High-A	Peoria Chiefs	High-A Central	West	Chris Swauger	45–75	6th of 6	
Low-A	Palm Beach Cardinals	Low-A Southeast	East	José León	37–80	4th of 4	
Rookie	FCL Cardinals	Florida Complex League	East	Roberto Espinoza	24–29	5th of 5	
Foreign Rookie	DSL Cardinals Blue	Dominican Summer League	South	Fray Peniche	21–38	7th of 8	
Foreign Rookie	DSL Cardinals Red	Dominican Summer League	San Pedro	Estuar Ruiz	27–30	6th of 8	

=== Major League Baseball draft ===
The 2021 Major League Baseball (MLB) First-Year Player Draft began on Sunday, July 11, and ended on Tuesday, July 13. The draft assigned amateur baseball players to MLB teams.

2021 St. Louis Cardinals complete draft list

Round	Pick	Name, Age	Pos / Bats	School (State)	Signing bonus
1	18	Michael McGreevy, 21	RHP / R	University of California, Santa Barbara (CA)	$2.75 million
2	54	Joshua Báez, 18	OF / R	Dexter Southfield School (MA)	$2.25 million
3	70	Ryan Holgate, 21	OF / L	University of Arizona (AZ)	$875,000
3	90	Austin Love, 22	RHP / R	University of North Carolina (NC)	$600,000
4	120	Zane Mills, 21	RHP / R	Washington State University (WA)	$375,000
5	151	Gordon Graceffo, 21	RHP / R	Villanova University (PA)	$500,000
6	181	Alfredo Ruiz, 21	LHP / L	Long Beach State University (CA)	$50,000
7	211	Alec Willis, 18	RHP / R	Regis Jesuit High School (CO)	$1.00 million
8	241	Mike Antico, 23	OF / L	University of Texas (TX)	$20,000
9	271	Trent Baker, 22	RHP / R	Angelo State University (TX)	$75,000
10	301	Osvaldo Tovalin, 21	3B / R	Azusa Pacific University (CA)	$50,000
11	331	Mack Chambers, 21	SS / S	University of New Mexico (NM)	$175,000
12	361	Chris Gerard, 21	LHP / R	Virginia Tech (VA)	$250,000
13	391	Hayes Heinecke, 22	LHP / L	Wofford College (SC)	$125,000
14	421	Andre Granillo, 21	RHP / R	University of California, Riverside (CA)	$125,000
15	451	Alex Cornwell, 22	LHP / L	University of Southern California (CA)	$50,000
16	481	Aaron McKeithan, 21	C / R	University of North Carolina at Charlotte (NC)	$50,000
17	511	Elijah Cabell, 21	OF / R	Florida State University (FL)	$125,000
18	541	Andrew Marrero, 21	RHP / R	University of Connecticut (CT)	$100,000
19	571	Thomas Francisco, 22	1B / L	East Carolina University (NC)	$100,000
20	601	Xavier Casserilla, 18	3B / R	V.R. Eaton High School (TX)	Did not sign
