= John Mozeliak =

American baseball executive (born 1969)

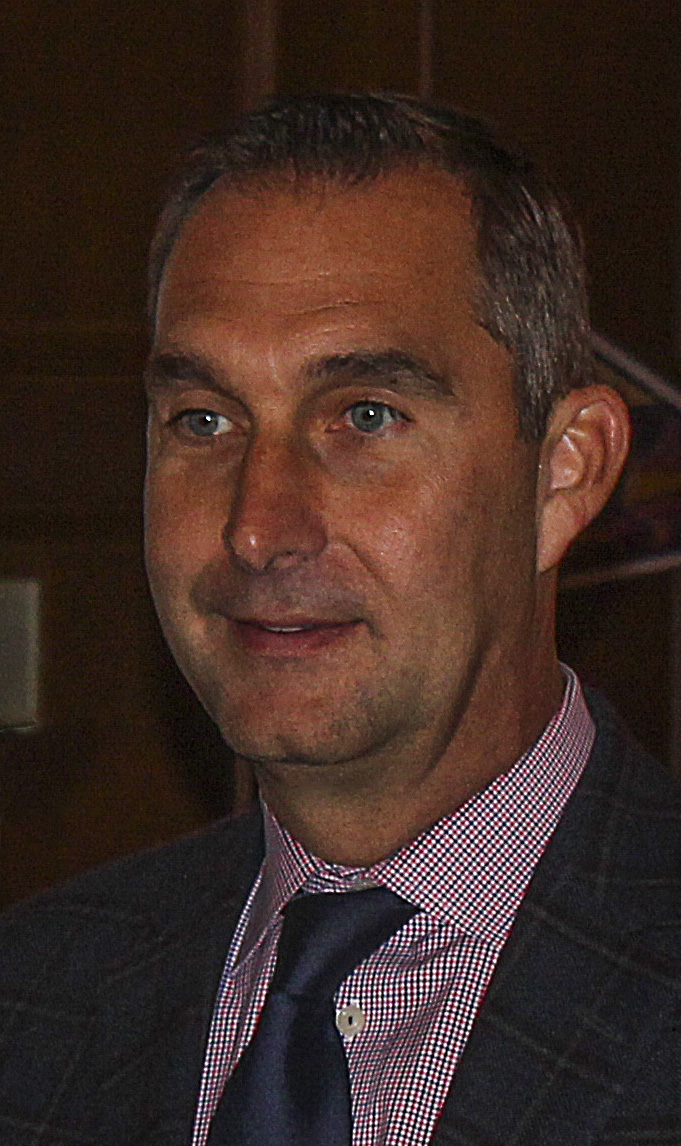
- Mozeliak in 2015
- Born: January 18, 1969 (age 57); Boulder, Colorado, U.S.

Teams
- Colorado Rockies (1993–1995); St. Louis Cardinals (1995–2025); Los Angeles Angels (2026)

John Mozeliak (/moʊˈzeɪlɑːk/ moh-ZAY-lak) (born January 18, 1969) is an American professional baseball executive. He served as the general manager and president of baseball operations of the St. Louis Cardinals from 2007 to 2025. Never a professional player, Mozeliak originally came to the Cardinals in 1995 as then-GM Walt Jocketty's assistant.

Mozeliak's tenure with St. Louis included 10 postseason berths, two National League pennants, and a World Series championship in 2011. He posted a franchise-record 15 consecutive winning seasons from 2008 to 2022, and his 1,521 wins are the most in the NL during that span. During his time, the Cardinals' minor league farm system received numerous accolades following the volume of prospects that succeeded at the major league level, including Baseball America bestowing the franchise with the Organization of the Year Award in 2011 and 2013.

== Early life and education ==
Mozeliak attended Fairview High School in Boulder, Colorado. He played for the school's baseball team as a pitcher and first baseman. He also played American Legion Baseball. Mozeliak attended the University of Arizona, where he was a member of Phi Delta Theta fraternity, before ultimately graduating from the University of Colorado Boulder.

== Career beginnings (1993–2007) ==
=== Colorado Rockies (1993–95) ===
In 1993, Jay Darnell, the Colorado Rockies' video coordinator, introduced Mozeliak to Bryn Smith, pitcher for the Rockies. Smith was looking for a location to go fly fishing. A few days after Mozeliak took Smith fly fishing, the Rockies invited Mozeliak to serve as a batting practice pitcher, since they needed someone who could throw left handed. Dante Bichette took a liking to Mozeliak, and they created a clubhouse job for Mozeliak. He began to work with Bob Gebhard, the Rockies' general manager (GM), and Walt Jocketty, the assistant GM.

=== St. Louis Cardinals' scouting department (1995–2007) ===
When the St. Louis Cardinals hired Jocketty as their GM in 1995, Mozeliak went to St. Louis as well. He served as an assistant within the scouting department and later spent five seasons as Jocketty's assistant GM. He became the assisting scouting director in 1998. The next season, Mozeliak was promoted to scouting director and oversaw the drafting of talent such as Albert Pujols and Yadier Molina. He garnered much attention as a major up-and-coming GM in the industry and interviewed with the Cincinnati Reds and Houston Astros.

== St. Louis Cardinals general manager (2007–2025) ==
On October 3, 2007, chairman of the board of directors William DeWitt Jr. announced that the Cardinals "had cordially and respectfully" parted ways with Jocketty based on philosophical differences of player development. DeWitt named Mozeliak the interim GM. Dating back to the year before, tension arose after Jeff Luhnow, later the Astros' GM, was promoted to vice president of amateur scouting and player development. After more than a decade as GM, Luhnow's promotion tacitly signaled he had usurped that sphere of Jocketty's authority.

While other candidates interviewed for the GM position, it appeared Cleveland Indians assistant GM Chris Antonetti was the early favorite. However, Indians ownership improved Antonetti's offer to take over the full GM position and enticed him to stay. On the evening of October 30, 2007, Mozeliak accepted the Cardinals' offer and the team formally introduced him as the new GM the next day.

=== Early moves (2007–10) ===
One of Mozeliak's first major moves was to trade iconic center fielder Jim Edmonds to the San Diego Padres for minor league third baseman David Freese on December 15, 2007. Although stating regret at first over trading the popular but often-injured Edmonds, Freese later proved to be integral in the Cardinals' 2011 season.

==== Matt Holliday ====
In 2009, Mozeliak acquired slugger Matt Holliday in a trade with the Oakland Athletics and signed him to the richest contract in team history the following January, valued at $116 million. Holliday produced an .874 OPS and an OPS+ of 138 as a Cardinal, compared to 132 for his career. On September 26, the Cardinals clinched their first division title during Mozeliak's tenure as GM against the Colorado Rockies. However, they lost to the Los Angeles Dodgers in the NLDS. When Holliday was a free agent the following offseason, DeWitt became frustrated with agent Scott Boras and walked away from negotiations. However, Mozeliak, who had developed a strong working relationship with DeWitt, persuaded him to sign Holliday for seven years at $17 million per year.

==== Quest for consistency at shortstop ====
After Édgar Rentería manned shortstop for the Cardinals from 1999 to 2004, he left for the Boston Red Sox via free agency. The Cardinals found difficulty filling the position. In 2009, a trade involving Mark Worrell and Luke Gregerson brought Khalil Greene from the Padres. With poor performance and a $6.5 million salary, he took time off in May and June. It was revealed that he may have been attempting to inflict injury upon himself, indicative of social anxiety disorder. Greene appeared in 77 games that season, batting just .200 with six home runs and 24 runs batted in. That was the last time he appeared in the major leagues. All told, in the 13 seasons between 2005 and 2017, the Cardinals featured 10 different Opening Day shortstops, with only David Eckstein (2005-2007) serving as the primary shortstop more than two seasons. The positional flux eased with the 2017 ascendance of Paul DeJong, who started a majority of the team's games at SS for five consecutive seasons (2017-2021).

==== Lance Berkman contract ====
The Cardinals announced that Mozeliak endorsed a new three-year contract extension with the team through 2013 on July 15, 2010. The following offseason, Mozeliak created a stir––even drawing ridicule ––for inking 34-year-old Lance Berkman to a one-year, $8 million contract on December 4. Due to his 2010 results of a .248 batting average with 14 home runs and 58 RBIs in 122 games with the Houston Astros and New York Yankees, opinions circulated that he was too old to continue to produce at his former levels.

However, Berkman dramatically improved his physical shape in the offseason. Early the next season, hitting coach Mark McGwire corrected a flaw in Berkman's swing that had been introduced by leg injuries and he responded with a .301 batting average, 31 home runs and 94 RBIs. His 164 OPS+ was the highest of his career and his accolades for the year included an All-Star appearance, the NL Comeback Player of the Year award and seventh place in the MVP voting.

=== The path to the 2011 World Series ===
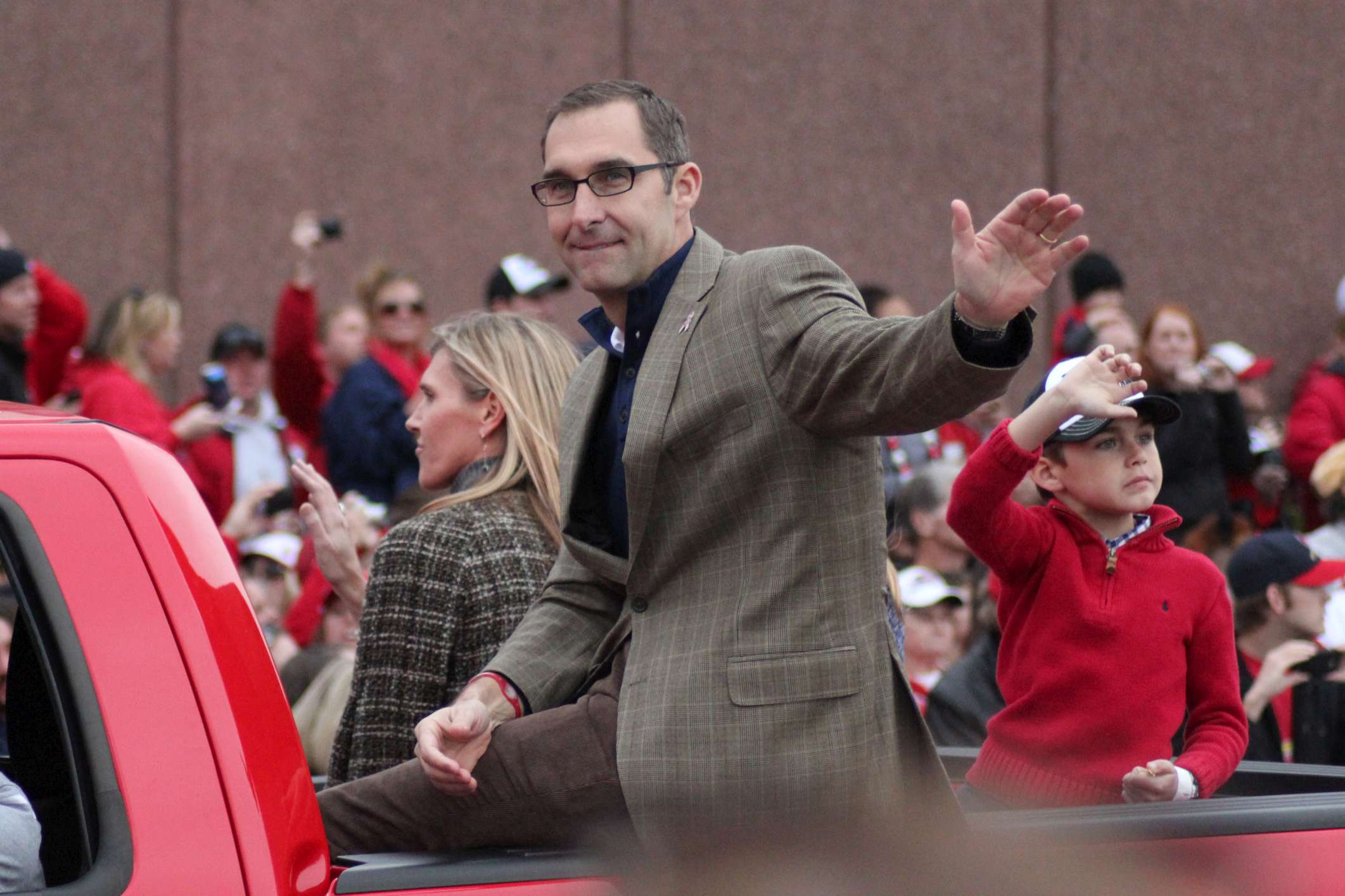
Mozeliak during the 2011 World Series parade

Mozeliak engineered a trade that shaped the 2011 season on July 27. He traded the center fielder Colby Rasmus, relievers Trever Miller, P. J. Walters, and Brian Tallet to the Toronto Blue Jays for starter Edwin Jackson, relievers Octavio Dotel, and Marc Rzepczynski, outfielder Corey Patterson, and three players to be named or cash.

Still 10.5 games short of the wild card berth after 130 games on August 25, the Cardinals ended the season on a 22-9 run while capitalizing on the Atlanta Braves' collapse to avoid elimination on the season's final day, capping one of Major League Baseball's epic regular-season comebacks. Dotel and Rzepczynski proved to factor significantly in making up the 10.5 games as they helped stabilize questionable bullpen performance. Dotel posted a 3.28 ERA and struck out 32 of the 96 batters he faced. Rzepczynski posted a 3.97 ERA. Jackson started twelve games for the Cardinals and posted a 3.58 ERA, winning five games and losing two. The 10.5 games-won deficit is also the highest-surmounted at 130 games in MLB history.

==== 2011 postseason ====
In the postseason––the Cardinals' second appearance during Mozeliak's tenure as GM––Freese set the-then single postseason RBI record with 21. He also salvaged the Cardinals from elimination in the World Series against the Texas Rangers by driving home the tying run on the final strike in the ninth inning of Game 6 –– which was accomplished again later that game. Tying the score twice on the final strike in one game was the first such occurrence in World Series history. Berkman became the second batter to tie the game on the team's final strike in the ninth inning or later with a two-run single in the tenth. Freese then ended the game in the eleventh with a home run off Mark Lowe. Berkman and Freese became just the third and fourth hitters in World Series history to knock game-tying hits where the alternative was elimination. Driven primarily by the Rasmus and Freese trades and the Berkman acquisition, Mozeliak achieved his first World Series title culminating in a game that "ranks among the greatest games in Fall Classic history" and "one of the greatest thrillers in baseball history."

==== Albert Pujols' free agency ====
Following the 2011 World Series, the Cardinals found themselves in the position of having to negotiate to re-sign iconic first baseman Albert Pujols when he filed for free agency on December 1. The Cardinals had offered $198 million over nine years the previous January. After the season concluded, the Cardinals reopened their bid with five years and $130 million. Other teams reportedly pursuing him were the Miami Marlins and two "mystery teams." The Marlins' offers were for nine years, then ten, but at first neither monetary figures were disclosed nor information was available on whether a no-trade clause would be included.

The Cardinals increased their offer to $200 million over ten years, then $220 million; however, the two unidentified teams eclipsed the initial offer. Miami Marlins offered $200 million then $225 million. Pujols then signed with one of the two anonymous teams on December 8 which had been revealed through rumors just a few days before –– the Los Angeles Angels of Anaheim –– for $254 million over ten years.

After signing with the Angels, Albert Pujols' wife, Diedre Pujols, commented on a St. Louis radio show that what the Cardinals had offered was an "'insult" and that they were "confused" after being told "'we want you to be a Cardinal for life.'" Even so, Pujols' performance decline started before he became a free agent: in 2012, he finished in career lows in multiple categories, and in 2013, plantar fasciitis cut his season short. Since then, Mozeliak's decision to let Pujols walk has paid off, as with the money he saved by not signing him, he extended ace Adam Wainwright and star catcher Yadier Molina. Also, with the two Compensation Picks the St. Louis Cardinals received from the Angels, they drafted 2013 postseason hero Michael Wacha and a promising young hitter who was the Cardinals' top prospect after 2014 according to MLB.com, Stephen Piscotty.

=== Farm system turnaround (2012–present) ===
Despite the Cardinals' major league success in the 21st century spanning well before Mozeliak's tenure as GM –– they have just one losing season and nine playoff appearances since 2000 –– the farm system had lagged behind until more recent seasons. Between 2000 and 2007, the highest rank the farm system garnered was 21st; between 2002 and 2005 it "ranked 30th, 28th, 28th and 30th." After 2011, Baseball America bestowed the Cardinals franchise with their first Organization of the Year award. Seventeen of the 25 players on the 2011 playoff roster were players who had spent their entire careers with the Cardinals. ESPN's Keith Law and Baseball Prospectus also ranked the Cardinals organization #1 for the 2013 season.

After losing shortstop Rafael Furcal to injury in 2012, the Cardinals called up Pete Kozma to replace Furcal. Noted for his defense, Kozma had shown a poor track record in the minor leagues as a hitter, producing a .652 on-base plus slugging percentage (OPS) in 671 minor league games. However, during his major league call-up in 2012, he batted .333 with a .952 OPS in 82 plate appearances. His skillful hitting continued in the playoffs, as he hit an RBI single in Game 5 against the Washington Nationals in the NLDS that ultimately proved to be the game and series winner, allowing the Cardinals to advance to the NLCS. Kozma became the starting shortstop the next season, but could not sustain his improved hitting in the Major Leagues, slumping to a .548 OPS. In the following World Series against the Boston Red Sox, a two-play error contributed to a Red Sox' Game 1 victory on the way to the Red Sox winning the Series.

==== Contracts ====
On February 14, 2013, the Cardinals extended Mozeliak's contract by three years to end after the 2016 season. Late in spring training 2013, right-handed starting pitcher Adam Wainwright agreed to a five-year, $97.5 million extension that runs through 2018, the richest contract the Cardinals have awarded to a pitcher. That spring, the Cardinals also signed first baseman Allen Craig to a five-year, $32 million contract.

==== Trade for Bourjos; contract for Peralta ====
After making it to the 2013 World Series only to lose to the Boston Red Sox, the Cardinals addressed weaknesses the following offseason at shortstop and center field. First, they traded Freese and relief pitcher Fernando Salas to the Los Angeles Angels of Anaheim for center fielder Peter Bourjos and right fielder Randal Grichuk.

Just two days later, they signed free agent shortstop Jhonny Peralta to a four-year, $53 million contract. The Cardinals still had yet to find consistency at shortstop since the days of Rentería, and Peralta was seen as a player who could bring that consistency. However, the signing drew scrutiny because he had served a 50-game suspension for his connection to the Biogenesis scandal earlier in the season.

Fellow players such as Brad Ziegler of the Arizona Diamondbacks publicly complained that the 50-game suspension was not enough of a deterrent, because it appeared to fail to prevent players who violated the collective bargaining agreement's banned-substances-use policy to receive compensation for their performances equal to those who had not been found to violate the policy. Mozeliak defended the contract, stating that the Cardinals were not self-appointed "morality police". He further explained that "character and makeup are something we weigh into our decision-making. In his case, he admitted what he did, he took responsibility for it. I feel like he has paid for his mistakes, and obviously if he were to make another one, then it would be a huge disappointment."

The Cardinals signed All-Star second baseman Matt Carpenter to a six-year, $52 million extension on March 6, 2014. Included was an option for 2020 worth $18.5 million. The previous year, he led the major leagues in hits, runs scored, and doubles while batting .318 and becoming a regular at a position he had yet to play as professional. Mozeliak cited his work ethic as another factor in the extension.

On April 12, 2014, the Cardinals announced they had extended Mozeliak's contract by two years through the 2018 season. They won the division this season but fell to the Giants in the NLCS.

Reports surfaced on June 16, 2015, that the Federal Bureau of Investigation (FBI) were reviewing an alleged incident involving Cardinals' front office officials hacking into the Houston Astros' database of players, scouting reports and proprietary statistics. It was regarded as the first known case of corporate espionage involving computer network hacking in professional sports. The matter wasn't adjudicated until January 30, 2017 when Commissioner Rob Manfred ruled that the Cardinals forfeit its top two selections in that year's MLB draft (numbers 56 and 75 in the second and competitive balance round B respectively) and $2 million in damages to the Astros.

On September 19, 2015, the Cardinals became the first team in MLB to clinch a playoff spot that season. It also extended the franchise record of five consecutive seasons of reaching the postseason, a record the club had set the previous season.

On June 30, 2017, Mozeliak was promoted to a new role that many teams were creating: president of baseball operations, while assistant GM Mike Girsch was named the new vice president and general manager of the Cardinals. These promotions came with contract guarantees for both through the 2020 season.

After a three-year absence from the postseason, the Cards won the NL Central in 2019 and defeated the Atlanta Braves in a five game NLDS. However, they went on to fall in a four game sweep to the Washington Nationals in the NLCS.

In 2020, the Cardinals would only end up playing 58 total games due to COVID-19 pandemic that had reached American shores in late January. The Cardinals were hit particularly hard by COVID, with many games being delayed and cancelled due to persistent outbreaks in the clubhouse. As a result of the shortened season, MLB expanded the playoff format for 2020 to eight teams in each league, in which the Cardinals landed themselves in as the five-seed team, finishing 2nd in the NL Central with a final record of 30–28. The Cardinals visited San Diego for a 3-game Wild Card series, where they took Game 1 but fell in Games 2 and 3 to lose the series and end their season.

In 2021 the Cardinals finished the season at 90–72, with help from a franchise-record 17-game winning streak in September to put them into the postseason. The team also was the first to have five players win Gold Glove Awards in the same season, with those being first baseman Paul Goldschmidt, second baseman Tommy Edman, third baseman Nolan Arenado, left fielder Tyler O'Neill and center fielder Harrison Bader. In the NL Wild Card Game, the Cardinals faced the 106-win Los Angeles Dodgers, where both teams battled each other for eight innings in a 1-1 ballgame before Alex Reyes surrendered a walk-off 2-run homerun to Chris Taylor, ending the Cardinals historic season. Eight days later, the Cardinals dismissed Mike Shildt, who had been manager since 2018, and elevated bench coach Oliver Marmol in his place.

==== Pujols' return ====
In March 2022, Mozeliak and the Cardinals worked a 1-year, $2.5 million deal with free agent and franchise player Albert Pujols to finish his career with other franchise legend Yadier Molina.

In the first year of managing for Oliver Marmol, the Cardinals were guided to a 93–69 record, which was enough to win them the NL Central for the first time since 2019. The team had several individual successes and milestones, including Albert Pujols' 700th career home run, in a 11–0 victory vs. the Dodgers in Los Angeles on September 23. On September 14, Adam Wainwright and Yadier Molina made their MLB-record 325th start as battery mates, breaking the record held by the Detroit Tigers' Mickey Lolich and Bill Freehan. First baseman Paul Goldschmidt won the NL MVP, an honor for which third baseman Nolan Arenado was a finalist.

Going into the postseason as the 3-seed, the Cardinals were the favorites at home against the Philadelphia Phillies, who had made the postseason as the 6-seed as part of MLB's expanded playoff format. This was the Phillies first postseason trip since 2011. The Cardinals were upset in a 2-game sweep, resulting in their third straight first-round playoff exit.

On February 13, 2023, the Cardinals signed Mozeliak to a contract extension through the 2025 season. The Cardinals experienced their only losing seasons during Mozeliak's tenure in 2023 and 2025. He stepped down from his role with the expiration of his contract and was replaced by Chaim Bloom.

== Los Angeles Angels (2026) ==
On June 26, 2026, the Los Angeles Angels fired general manager Perry Minasian and named Mozeliak as their interim general manager. On October 21, 2026, it was announced that Mozeliak will not be back as Angel general manager.

== Awards and honors ==
Personal awards

- Andrew "Rube" Foster Legacy Award as NL Executive of the Year (2012)
- GIBBY Executive of the Year (2011)
- MLB.com Executive of the Year (2011)

Club distinctions with Mozeliak as general manager (2008–present)

- Baseball America #1 minor league system (2013)
- Baseball Prospectus #1 minor league system (2013)
- ESPN #1 minor league system (2013)
- 2× Baseball America's Organization of the Year (2011, 2013)
- 2× World Series appearances: 2011 (won), 2013
- 5× National League Championship Series (NLCS) appearances: 2011 (won), 2012, 2013 (won), 2014, 2019
- 7x National League Division Series (NLDS) appearances: 2009, 2011 (won), 2012 (won), 2013 (won), 2014 (won), 2015, 2019 (won)
- 6x National League Central division titles: 2009, 2013, 2014, 2015, 2019, 2022
- 4× National League wild card entrant: 2011, 2012, 2020, 2021
- 15x regular-season winning percentage ≥ .500 (2008–2022)

Achievements

- Franchise record 5 consecutive seasons with playoff appearance (2011–15)

== Personal life and other ventures ==
Mozeliak, his wife Julie, daughter Allyson and son Will reside in St. Louis. He is the National Trustee for the Foundation Fighting Blindness.

Preceded by Walt Jocketty	St. Louis Cardinals general manager 2007–2017	Succeeded by Mike Girsch
Preceded by Position established	St. Louis Cardinals president of baseball operations 2017–2025	Succeeded by Chaim Bloom
