= Mike Shildt =

American baseball coach and manager (born 1968)

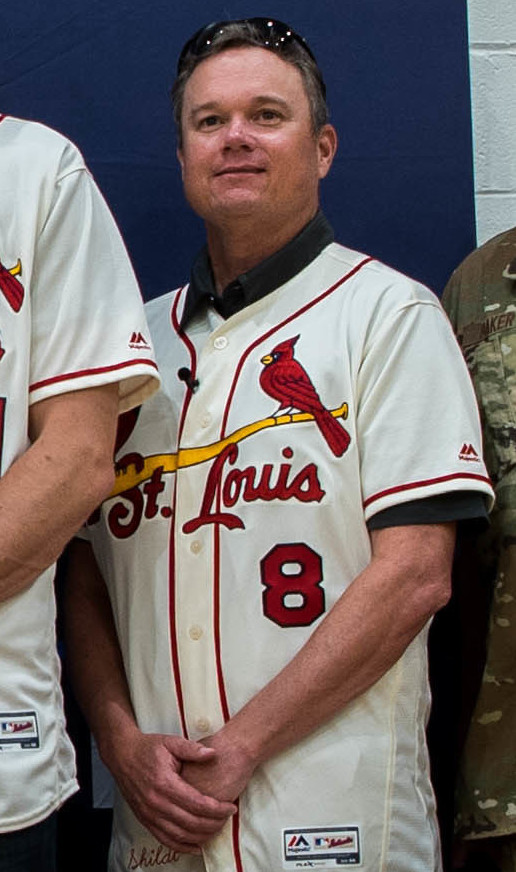
- Shildt with the St. Louis Cardinals in 2019
- Born: August 9, 1968 (age 58); Charlotte, North Carolina, U.S.

MLB statistics
- Managerial record: 435–340
- Winning %: .561
- Stats at Baseball Reference
- Managerial record at Baseball Reference

Teams
- As manager: St. Louis Cardinals (2018–2021); San Diego Padres (2024–2025); As coach: St. Louis Cardinals (2017–2018); San Diego Padres (2022–2023)

Career highlights and awards
- NL Manager of the Year (2019)

Michael Timothy Shildt (born August 9, 1968) is an American former professional baseball manager and coach. He managed in Major League Baseball (MLB) for the St. Louis Cardinals and San Diego Padres. He currently serves as a coordinator of instruction in the Baltimore Orioles organization.

After serving as a scout and manager for the Cardinals in Minor League Baseball, Shildt became the Cardinals' third base coach in 2017, bench coach in 2018, and manager mid-season in 2018 after the dismissal of Mike Matheny. The 2019 Cardinals advanced to the National League Championship Series and Shildt was named NL Manager of the Year. The 2020 and 2021 seasons ended in losses at the NL Wild Card Game. The Cardinals fired Shildt after the 2021 season. He coached the Padres in 2022 and 2023, and was named manager for the 2024 season. He retired from managerial duties after the 2025 season.

== Early career ==
Born in Charlotte, North Carolina, Shildt played high school baseball at Olympic High School and college baseball for University of North Carolina (UNC) Asheville Bulldogs. After his playing career ended, Shildt became a coach at West Charlotte High School where he helped bring the baseball team their first winning season in 20 years. After leaving the high school, Shildt was hired by UNC Charlotte to become an assistant coach for the Charlotte 49ers baseball team. He held the position for five years. During the off-season he owned a baseball training facility in Charlotte, North Carolina called the On Deck O’s; becoming a full-time baseball instructor to area youths.

== Professional career ==
=== Minor leagues ===
Shildt started his Major League Baseball career as an associate scout with the league for three seasons. He moved on to the St. Louis Cardinals organization, working as the area scout for North Carolina, South Carolina and Virginia. On a recommendation from future Cardinals general manager John Mozeliak, Shildt began his minor league coaching career as a part-time coach. Shildt was sent to the Cardinals' Single-A affiliate in the New York–Penn League. He was a part-time coach during 2004 and 2005 while continuing his scouting duties. He was promoted to a full-time coaching position in 2006, and kept coaching with the single A affiliate until the 2007 season. In 2008, Shildt coordinated the Cardinals' minor league spring training workout camp. Afterwards he became the hitting coach for the Johnson City Cardinals for the 2008 season.

Shildt was promoted to manage Johnson City in 2009, where he finished with a 37–30 record. In his second season, Johnson City posted a 42–24 win–loss record, and after defeating its two playoff opponents, won the Appalachian League championship. For his effort, Shildt was named St. Louis Cardinals Minor League Manager of the Year by Scout.com. He was also named the Appalachian League Manager of the Year. Among the players he helped improve during the season include Appalachian League's Pitcher of the Year Ryan Copeland, and batting average champion Phil Cerreto. After Johnson City's season ended, Shildt was invited to spend some time on the St. Louis Cardinals roster to gain experience. After the season, Shildt was awarded the Appalachian League Manager of the Year award, and the George Kissell Award for his "excellence in player development" by the St. Louis Cardinals organization.

Johnson City repeated as league champions in 2011 under Shildt. It was the first time that Johnson City clinched two consecutive league championships since 1975–1976. Shildt managed the Springfield Cardinals of the Double-A Texas League for three seasons. Shildt guided Springfield to its first Texas League championship before being recognized as Baseball America's Team of the Year in 2012. He then spent two seasons as the manager for the Memphis Redbirds of the Triple-A Pacific Coast League.

=== St. Louis Cardinals ===
Shildt was again promoted in 2017, this time to the MLB team, as the quality control coach. After a rough start to the 2017 season, third base coach Chris Maloney was reassigned in the organization, and Shildt became the full-time Cardinals third base coach for the rest of the 2017 season. When José Oquendo was brought back for the 2018 season to be the Cardinals' third base coach, Shildt became the team's bench coach for the 2018 season.

On July 14, 2018, Shildt was made interim manager of the Cardinals following the firing of Mike Matheny. He became only the eighth man to manage a Major League Baseball team despite not having ever played professional baseball at any level. On July 15, 2018, he collected his first major league managerial win in a 6–4 victory over the Cincinnati Reds. Bob Nightengale of USA Today tweeted on August 28, 2018, that the team would remove the interim tag from Shildt's title and name him the club's permanent manager, awarding him a three-year contract. Shildt won his 100th game as Cardinals manager with a 6–2 win over the Pittsburgh Pirates on August 9, 2019, his 51st birthday. Following a 3–2 win over the Chicago Cubs on September 22, 2019, the Cardinals clinched a playoff berth for the first time in Shildt's career as manager, and the first for the team since 2015. He was named the National League Manager of the Year. The Cardinals reached the playoffs in a shortened 2020 Major League Baseball season, losing in the Wild Card series. During the 2021 season, the Cardinals won 17 games in a row, the longest winning streak in franchise history. They clinched the second Wild Card spot but lost in the National League Wild Card Game on a two-out, two-run, walk-off home run given up by Alex Reyes in the bottom of the ninth inning to the Dodgers' Chris Taylor.

On October 14, 2021, the Cardinals announced Shildt would not return in the 2022 season having been dismissed due to "philosophical differences". He was nominated for National League Manager of the Year following the season's end, and came in third as the award was won by San Francisco Giants Manager Gabe Kapler.

=== San Diego Padres ===
After leaving the Cardinals, Shildt worked for MLB as a consultant. On January 26, 2022, Shildt was hired by the San Diego Padres to serve in a player development role. He began the 2022 season as the Padres' interim third base coach after Matt Williams had hip surgery during spring training.

On November 21, 2023, Shildt was named manager of the Padres after former manager Bob Melvin was hired by the San Francisco Giants. On November 6, 2024, Shildt and the Padres agreed to a two–year contract extension that runs through the 2027 season. On October 13, 2025, Shildt announced his retirement from the Padres, two years prior to the end of his contract. He finished 183–141 with San Diego with a 5–5 record in the playoffs. He was the first manager in the franchise's history to lead the team to consecutive 90-win seasons.

=== Baltimore Orioles ===
On November 26, 2025, the Baltimore Orioles hired Shildt to serve as their new coordinator of instruction in the upper levels of their minor league system.

== Managerial record ==
Shildt won three consecutive league championships in the minors from 2010 to 2012.

Shildt's .562 career-winning percentage makes him the 6th-winningest manager in baseball since 1947 among managers who have managed at least 450 games.

In 2021, Shildt's Cardinals secured their place in the playoffs with a 17-game winning streak during the last month of the season. It was the longest winning streak in the NL since 1935, broke the Cardinals' franchise record set in 1935, and was the first time the team won even 10 games in a row since 2001.

He was the 2019 NL Manager of the Year in his first full season as a manager.

Shildt teams are known for exceptional defense and baserunning. The Cardinals' defense went from 29th in 2018 to 1st in 2019. That year, their league-best +42 OAA was far ahead of the next closest team at +33. They made a franchise-low 66 errors on the season.

Shildt's Cardinals had twice as many Gold Glove winners from 2019 to 2021 as did any other team, including an MLB-record five (plus the team Gold Glove) in 2021.

Team	Year	Regular season					Postseason			
Team	Year	Games	Won	Lost	Win %	Finish	Won	Lost	Win %	Result
STL	2018	69	41	28	.594	3rd in NL Central	–	–	–	
STL	2019	162	91	71	.562	1st in NL Central	3	6	.333	Lost NLCS (WAS)
STL	2020	58	30	28	.517	2nd in NL Central	1	2	.333	Lost NLWC (SD)
STL	2021	162	90	72	.556	2nd in NL Central	0	1	.000	Lost NLWC (LAD)
STL total		451	252	199	.559		4	9	.308	
SD	2024	162	93	69	.574	2nd in NL West	4	3	.571	Lost NLDS (LAD)
SD	2025	162	90	72	.556	2nd in NL West	1	2	.333	Lost NLWC (CHC)
SD total		324	183	141	.565		5	5	.500	
Total		775	435	340	.561		9	14	.391	

== Personal life ==
Shildt married Michelle Segrave in March 2020 on an off day in the Cardinals' spring training schedule.
