= Giovanny Gallegos =

Mexican baseball player (born 1991)

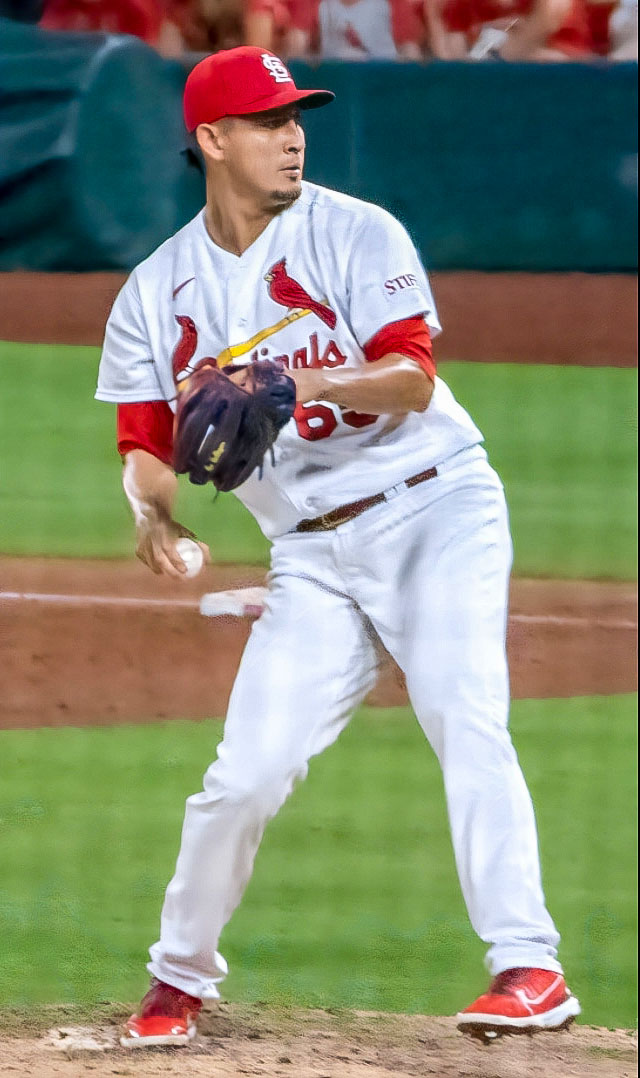
- Gallegos with the St. Louis Cardinals in 2023

Free agent
- Pitcher
- Born: August 14, 1991 (age 34); Ciudad Obregón, Mexico
- Bats: Right Throws: Right

MLB debut
- May 12, 2017, for the New York Yankees

MLB statistics (through 2024 season)
- Win–loss record: 18–21
- Earned run average: 3.49
- Strikeouts: 396
- Saves: 45
- Stats at Baseball Reference

Teams
- New York Yankees (2017–2018); St. Louis Cardinals (2018–2024)
Medals
Men's baseball
Representing Mexico
World Baseball Classic
Bronze medal – third place	2023 Miami	Team

Giovanny Gallegos (GHY-eh-gohz; born August 14, 1991) is a Mexican professional baseball pitcher who is a free agent. He has previously played in Major League Baseball (MLB) for the New York Yankees and St. Louis Cardinals. Gallegos made his MLB debut in 2017 with the Yankees and also pitched for them in 2018 before being traded to the Cardinals.

== Career ==
=== New York Yankees ===
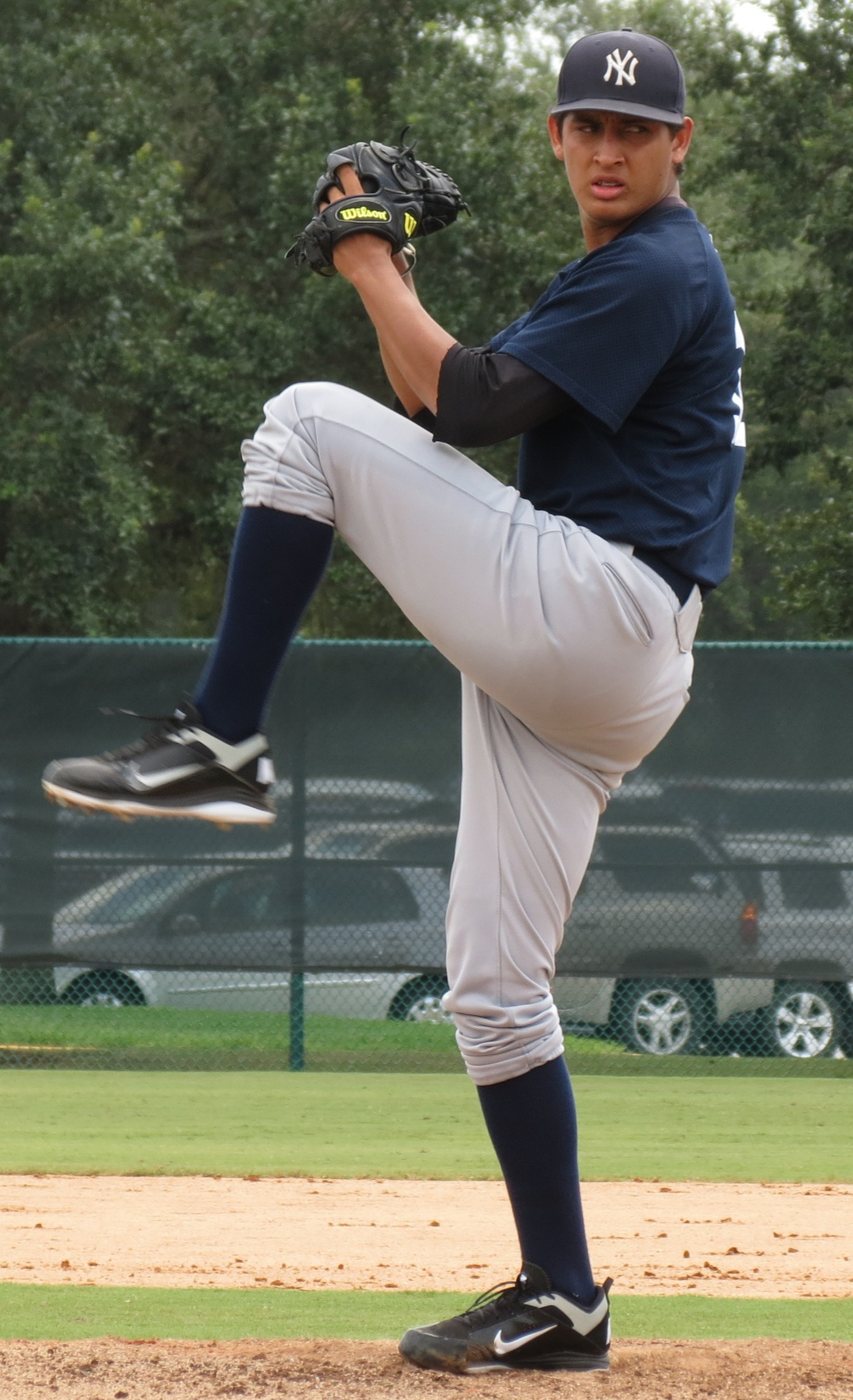
Gallegos with the Gulf Coast League Yankees in 2012

Gallegos signed with the New York Yankees as an international free agent in 2012. He made his professional debut that same year with the Gulf Coast League Yankees, compiling a 0–1 record with a 1.67 ERA in 27 innings pitched. In 2013, he pitched for the Staten Island Yankees where he was 2–8 with a 4.27 ERA in 16 starts, and in 2014, he played with the Charleston RiverDogs where he pitched to a 5–5 record and a 4.57 ERA in 29 games, mainly in relief. Gallegos spent a majority of 2015 with the Tampa Yankees, going 3–1 with a 1.35 ERA in 30 relief appearances, along with pitching in three games for the Trenton Thunder and two with the Scranton/Wilkes-Barre RailRiders. He spent 2016 with both Trenton and Scranton/Wilkes-Barre, compiling a combined 7–2 record and 1.27 ERA in 42 combined relief appearances between both teams. The Yankees added Gallegos to their 40-man roster after the 2016 season.

Gallegos played for the Mexico national baseball team in the 2017 World Baseball Classic.

Gallegos began 2017 with the RailRiders. The Yankees promoted Gallegos to the major leagues on May 11, 2017. He made his major league debut the next day. He spent the 2017 season between the two clubs, compiling a 4–2 record and 2.08 ERA in 28 relief appearances for Scranton/Wilkes-Barre, and a 0–1 record with a 4.87 ERA in 16 relief appearances for New York. He began 2018 with the RailRiders.

=== St. Louis Cardinals ===
On July 27, 2018, the Yankees traded Gallegos and Chasen Shreve to the St. Louis Cardinals in exchange for Luke Voit and bonus pool money. The Cardinals assigned him to the Memphis Redbirds, and spent the remainder of the year there before being promoted to St. Louis in late September. Gallegos began 2019 with Memphis. He was recalled to St. Louis on April 7. On April 11, Gallegos won his first career MLB game against the Los Angeles Dodgers pitching 1 1/3 innings as a relief pitcher. He was optioned back to Memphis on April 15, but recalled the next day, ultimately spending the remainder of the year in St. Louis.

Over 66 relief appearances during the 2019 regular season, Gallegos went 3–2 with a 2.31 ERA, striking out 93 over 74 innings. In a shortened 2020 season, Gallegos missed time after testing positive for COVID-19 and a groin injury, and pitched only 15 innings during the year, going 2–2 with a 3.60 ERA. Gallegos was a key member of the Cardinals' bullpen in 2021 and moved into the closer role in late August, finishing the season appearing in 73 games in which he went 6-5 with a 3.02 ERA, 95 strikeouts, and 14 saves over 80 1/3 relief innings pitched.

Gallegos finished the 2022 season having made 57 relief appearances in which he went 3–6 with a 3.05 ERA, 73 strikeouts, and 14 saves over 59 innings. On October 4, Gallegos and the Cardinals agreed to a two-year contract extension worth $11 million. He made 56 appearances for St. Louis in 2023, compiling a 4.42 ERA with 59 strikeouts and 10 saves across 55 innings pitched.

Gallegos made 21 relief outings for St. Louis in 2024, but struggled to a 6.53 ERA with 21 strikeouts across 20 2/3 innings pitched. On July 28, 2024, Gallegos was designated for assignment by the Cardinals. He elected free agency on August 2.

=== Minnesota Twins ===
On August 6, 2024, Gallegos signed a minor league contract with the Minnesota Twins. In 13 games for the Triple–A St. Paul Saints, he compiled a 4.26 ERA with 8 strikeouts across 12 2/3 innings pitched. Gallegos elected free agency following the season on November 4.

=== Los Angeles Dodgers ===
On November 23, 2024, Gallegos signed a minor league contract with the Los Angeles Dodgers that included an invitation to major league spring training. On July 17, 2025, Gallegos was placed on the full-season injured list ending his season without appearing in a game. He elected free agency following the season on November 6.
