= T. J. McFarland =

American baseball player (born 1989)

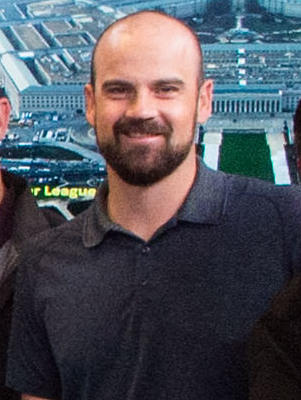
- McFarland at the Pentagon in 2018
- Pitcher
- Born: June 8, 1989 (age 37); Palos Hills, Illinois, U.S.
- Batted: Left Threw: Left

MLB debut
- April 6, 2013, for the Baltimore Orioles

Last MLB appearance
- June 26, 2025, for the Athletics

MLB statistics
- Win–loss record: 26–20
- Earned run average: 4.18
- Strikeouts: 325
- Stats at Baseball Reference

Teams
- Baltimore Orioles (2013–2016); Arizona Diamondbacks (2017–2019); Oakland Athletics (2020); St. Louis Cardinals (2021–2022); New York Mets (2023); Oakland Athletics / Athletics (2024–2025)

Timothy John McFarland (born June 8, 1989) is an American former professional baseball pitcher. He played in Major League Baseball (MLB) for the Baltimore Orioles, Arizona Diamondbacks, St. Louis Cardinals, New York Mets, and Oakland Athletics / Athletics from 2013 to 2025.

== Career ==
=== Amateur career ===
McFarland attended Amos Alonzo Stagg High School in Palos Hills, Illinois, where he played for the school's baseball and basketball teams for four years. As a senior, McFarland recorded 103 strikeouts while walking only 13 in 66 2/3 innings pitched. He signed a letter of intent to attend the University of Missouri and play college baseball for the Missouri Tigers baseball team.

=== Cleveland Indians ===
The Cleveland Indians selected McFarland in the fourth round of the 2007 MLB draft. Rather than attend Missouri, McFarland signed with the Indians. While pitching for the Kinston Indians of the High–A Carolina League in 2010, he was named to the all-star game. McFarland spent the 2012 season with the Akron Aeros of the Double–A Eastern League and the Columbus Clippers of the Triple–A International League.

=== Baltimore Orioles ===
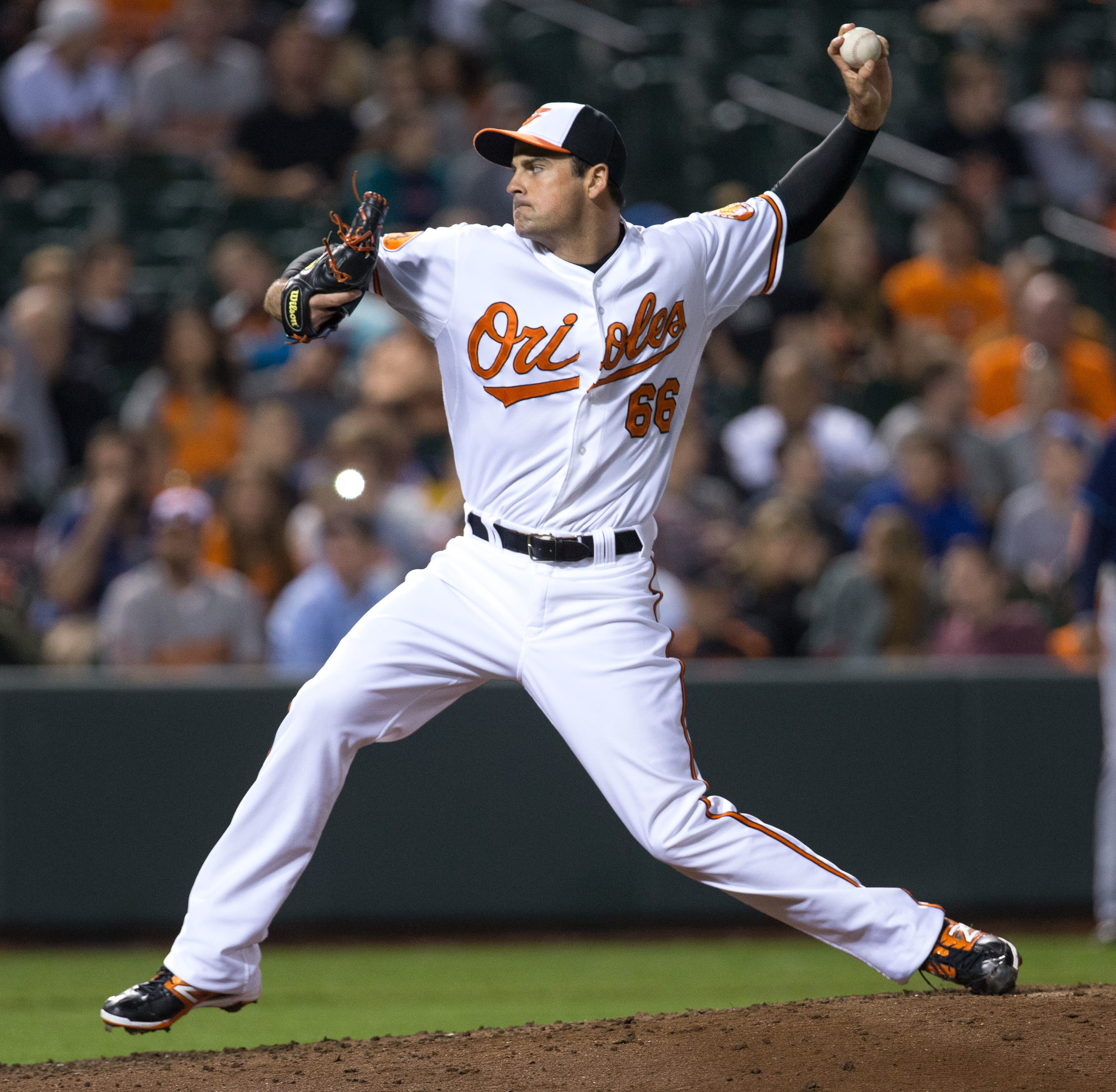
McFarland with the Orioles in 2013

On December 6, 2012, the Baltimore Orioles selected McFarland from the Indians in the Rule 5 draft. After a strong spring training, he was named to the Orioles' Opening Day roster. The Orioles traded fellow relief pitcher Luis Ayala in April 2013, further solidifying McFarland's hold on a roster spot and improving his chances of staying with Baltimore; a Rule 5 pick must remain with the MLB team that drafted him for the entire season or be offered back to the original team for $25,000. He earned his first career major league win on June 13, pitching an inning of relief against the Boston Red Sox. He made his first career start on June 28 against the New York Yankees. In his first full major league season, McFarland made 38 appearances with all but one in relief.

McFarland earned his first major league win as a starter on July 1, 2014, against the Texas Rangers. In 37 appearances for the Orioles in 2014, he compiled a 4–2 record and 2.76 ERA with 34 strikeouts across 58 2/3 innings pitched. McFarland pitched in 30 contests for Baltimore in 2015, posting a 2–2 record and 4.91 ERA with 26 strikeouts over 40 1/3 innings of work.

McFarland made 16 relief appearances for the Orioles during the 2016 campaign, but struggled to a 6.93 ERA with 7 strikeouts across 24 2/3 innings pitched. On February 19, 2017, McFarland was designated for assignment following the acquisition of Vidal Nuño. He was released by Baltimore on February 26.

=== Arizona Diamondbacks ===
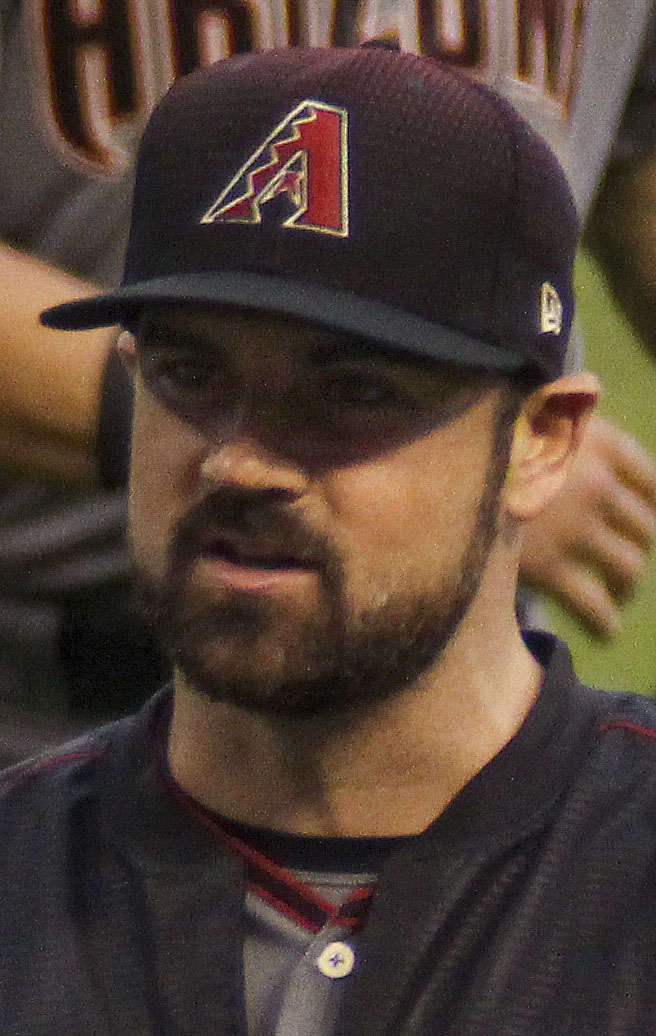
McFarland with the Diamondbacks in 2017

On March 3, 2017, McFarland signed a minor league contract with the Arizona Diamondbacks. The Diamondbacks promoted him to the major leagues on April 27. In 43 games for Arizona, McFarland logged a 4–5 record and 5.33 ERA with 29 strikeouts across 54 innings. On December 1, McFarland was non-tendered by the Diamondbacks, making him a free agent.

On December 6, 2017, McFarland re-signed with the Diamondbacks on a one-year, $850,000 contract. In 2018, McFarland posted a career-best 2.00 ERA with 42 strikeouts in 47 appearances. In 2019, he recorded a 4.82 ERA with 35 strikeouts in 56 innings over 51 games for the Diamondbacks.

=== Oakland Athletics ===
On November 4, 2019, McFarland was claimed off waivers by the Oakland Athletics. In 2020 for Oakland, McFarland pitched to a 4.35 ERA with 9 strikeouts over 20 2/3 innings pitched in 20 appearances. He became a free agent after the shortened 2020 season.

=== Washington Nationals ===
On February 16, 2021, McFarland signed a minor league contract with the Washington Nationals organization. On March 27, McFarland was released by the Nationals. On March 31, McFarland re-signed with the Nationals on a new minor league contract. He was assigned to the Triple-A Rochester Red Wings to begin the 2021 season, and logged a 5.25 ERA in 18 appearances before he was released on June 30.

=== St. Louis Cardinals ===
On June 30, 2021, McFarland signed a split contract with the St. Louis Cardinals organization, claiming that he had a better chance to get called up in St. Louis than in Washington. On July 16, McFarland's contract was selected to the active roster. He spent the remainder of the season with St. Louis, going 4–1 with a 2.56 ERA in 38 relief appearances. In 38 2/3 innings pitched, McFarland recorded 21 strikeouts and 12 double plays, the latter of which set a new franchise record after the All-Star break. He was the losing pitcher in the NL Wild Card Game, surrendering a walk to Cody Bellinger, who later scored on Chris Taylor's tie-breaking walk-off home run.

On November 8, 2021, McFarland signed a one-year contract to return to the Cardinals. On August 10, 2022, McFarland was designated for assignment. At the time, he had a 6.61 ERA in 28 relief appearances. After his release, McFarland was re-signed by the Cardinals to a minor league contract on August 23. He was assigned to the Triple-A Memphis Redbirds. McFarland elected free agency following the season on November 10.

=== New York Mets ===
On December 20, 2022, McFarland signed a minor league deal with the New York Mets. In 23 appearances for the Triple–A Syracuse Mets, he worked to a 2.76 ERA with 37 strikeouts in 32 2/3 innings pitched. On June 26, McFarland's contract was selected, adding him to the active roster. In 3 appearances, he surrendered two runs (one earned) on four hits with two strikeouts in 1 2/3 innings of work. On July 14, he was designated for assignment following the activation of José Quintana from the injured list. After clearing waivers, McFarland elected free agency in lieu of an outright assignment on July 18.

=== Baltimore Orioles (second stint) ===
On July 22, 2023, McFarland signed a minor league contract with the Baltimore Orioles organization. In 21 games for the Triple–A Norfolk Tides, he pitched to a 1.80 ERA with 30 strikeouts across 30 innings of work. McFarland elected free agency following the season on November 6.

=== Oakland Athletics (second stint) ===
On January 26, 2024, McFarland signed a minor league contract with the Los Angeles Dodgers that included an invitation to spring training. On March 26, the Dodgers traded him to the Athletics in exchange for cash consideration and he was added to the major league roster. McFarland made 79 total appearances out of the bullpen for Oakland, compiling a 2–4 record and 3.81 ERA with 39 strikeouts across 56 2/3 innings pitched.

On November 7, 2024, McFarland re-signed with the Athletics on a one-year, $1.8 million contract. He made 27 appearances for the Athletics in 2025, pitching to a 6.89 ERA with seven strikeouts across 15 2/3 innings pitched. On June 27, McFarland was designated for assignment. He was released after clearing waivers on July 4.

On March 23, 2026, McFarland announced his retirement from professional baseball.

== Personal life ==
McFarland and his wife, Jenna, married in 2016 and welcomed their first child, a son, in November 2021.

In 2018, McFarland graduated from the University of Phoenix with a degree in business management.

== See also ==
- Rule 5 draft results
