= Scott Hurst =

American baseball player (born 1996)

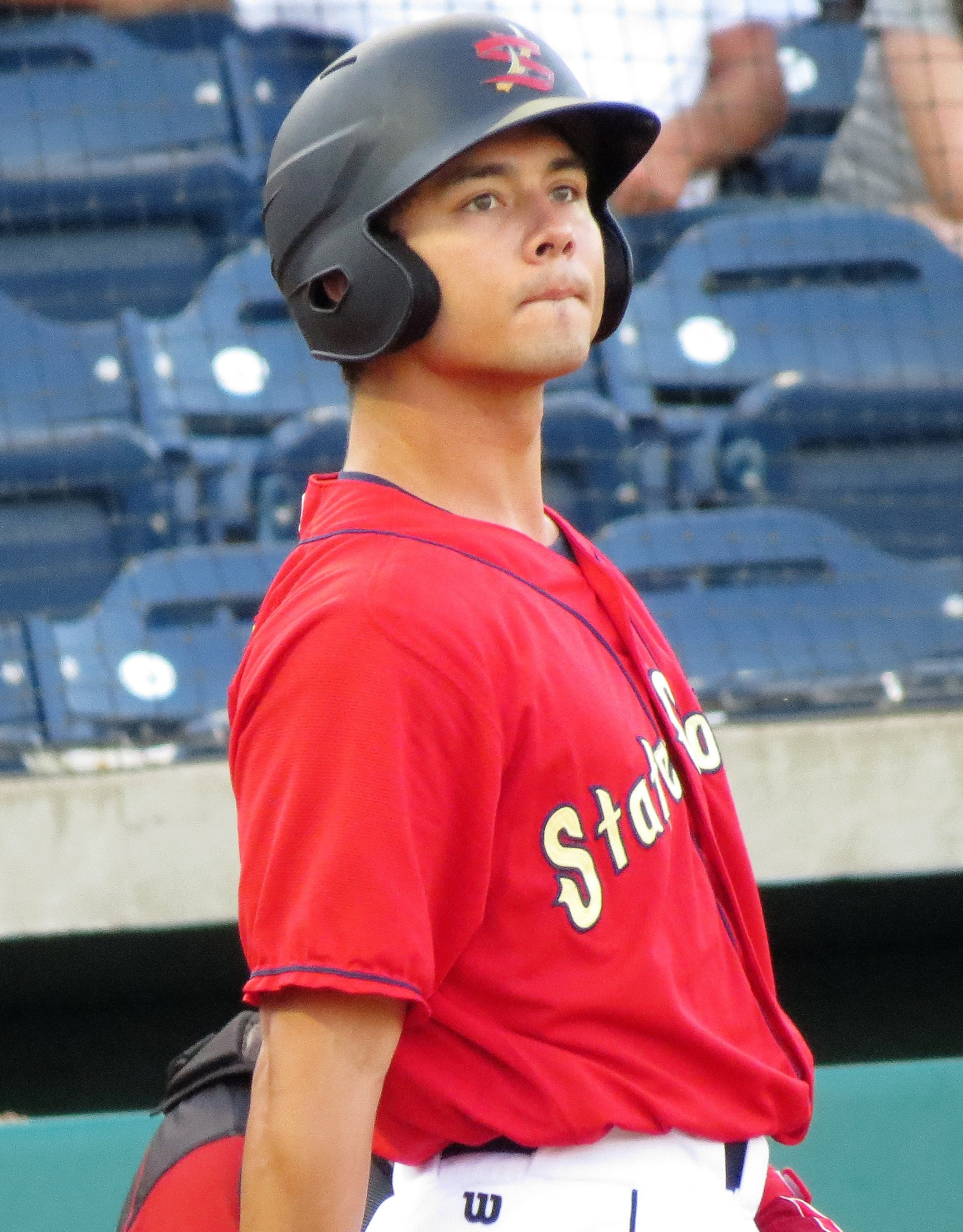
- Hurst with the State College Spikes in 2017
- Outfielder
- Born: March 25, 1996 (age 30); Glendora, California, U.S.
- Batted: Left Threw: Right

MLB debut
- April 16, 2021, for the St. Louis Cardinals

Last MLB appearance
- April 27, 2021, for the St. Louis Cardinals

MLB statistics
- Batting average: .000
- Home runs: 0
- Runs batted in: 0
- Stats at Baseball Reference

Teams
- St. Louis Cardinals (2021)
Medals
Men's baseball
Representing United States
18U Baseball World Cup
Gold medal – first place	2013 Taichung	Team

Scott Andrew Hurst (born March 25, 1996) is an American former professional baseball outfielder. He was drafted by the St. Louis Cardinals in the third round of the 2017 Major League Baseball draft and made his Major League Baseball (MLB) debut with them in 2021.

== Amateur career ==
Hurst attended Bishop Amat High School in La Puente, California. He is one of only six Bishop Amat baseball players to have their jersey retired. In September 2013, he played for the USA 18U baseball team that won the IBAF World Cup in Taiwan. As a senior in 2014, he batted .419 and pitched to a 0.66 ERA, helping lead Bishop Amat to a CIF Southern Section Division 3 title. He was not drafted out of high school in the 2014 Major League Baseball draft and he enrolled at California State University, Fullerton where he played college baseball for the Cal State Fullerton Titans.

Hurst struggled as a freshman and a sophomore, batting .250 in 41 games while dealing with back injuries and .215 in 51 games, respectively. After his sophomore year in 2016, he played collegiate summer baseball with the Orleans Firebirds of the Cape Cod Baseball League. As a junior in 2017, he broke out and started all 63 of Cal State Fullerton's games, batting .328 with 12 home runs and 40 RBIs and being named to the All-Big West first team. After his junior year, he was drafted by the St. Louis Cardinals in the third round (94th overall) of the 2017 Major League Baseball draft.

== Professional career ==
Hurst signed with the Cardinals for $450,000 and was assigned to the State College Spikes of the Low-A New York-Penn League, where he was named an All-Star. In 55 games, he slashed .282/.354/.432 with three home runs, 21 RBIs, and six triples. He began 2018 with the Peoria Chiefs of the Single-A Midwest League and was promoted to the Palm Beach Cardinals of the High-A Florida State League on August 1. He was placed on the injured list three times during the season, forcing him to miss playing time various times over the year. Over 49 games for Peoria, he hit .295/.361/.411 with three home runs and 25 RBIs, and in 14 games for Palm Beach he batted .354 with one home run and nine RBIs. Hurst began 2019 with the Springfield Cardinals of the Double-A Texas League. He was reassigned to Palm Beach in May, and promoted back to Springfield in July. At the end of the month, he returned to Palm Beach. Over 108 games between the two clubs, Hurst slashed .217/.287/.299 with five home runs and 33 RBIs. Hurst did not play a minor league game in 2020 due to the cancellation of the minor league season caused by the COVID-19 pandemic.

On April 15, 2021, the Cardinals promoted Hurst to the major leagues for the first time. He made his debut the next day as a pinch-hitter against the Philadelphia Phillies. He was optioned to the alternate site on April 28, and optioned to the Memphis Redbirds of the Triple-A East on April 30. He was designated for assignment on August 14, and outrighted to Memphis on August 16.

Hurst spent all of 2022 with Memphis, playing in 90 games and batting .286/.399/.434 with career–highs in home runs (10), RBI (38), and stolen bases (18). He began the 2023 season back with Triple-A Memphis, but went 4-for-30 (.133) with no extra-base hits and 12 strikeouts. On June 1, 2023, the Cardinals released Hurst.
