= Jake Woodford =

American baseball player (born 1996)

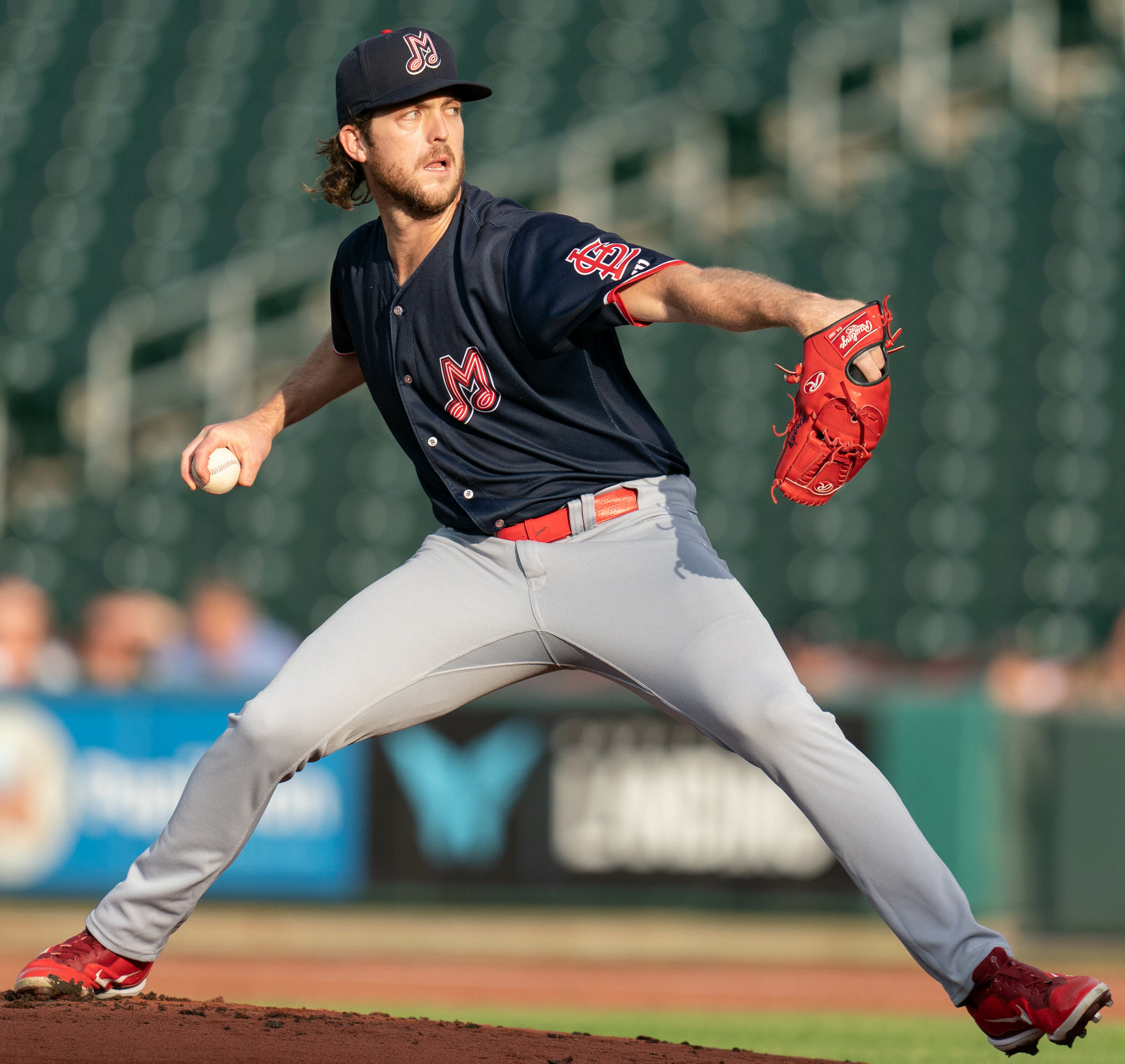
- Woodford with the Memphis Redbirds in 2023

Free agent
- Pitcher
- Born: October 28, 1996 (age 30); St. Petersburg, Florida, U.S.
- Bats: Right Throws: Right

MLB debut
- August 15, 2020, for the St. Louis Cardinals

MLB statistics (through 2026 season)
- Win–loss record: 11–17
- Earned run average: 5.36
- Strikeouts: 193
- Stats at Baseball Reference

Teams
- St. Louis Cardinals (2020–2023); Chicago White Sox (2024); Pittsburgh Pirates (2024); Arizona Diamondbacks (2025); Milwaukee Brewers (2026); Chicago Cubs (2026); Tampa Bay Rays (2026)

Jacob Robert Woodford (born October 28, 1996) is an American professional baseball pitcher who is a free agent. He has previously played in MLB for the St. Louis Cardinals, Chicago White Sox, Pittsburgh Pirates, Arizona Diamondbacks, Milwaukee Brewers, Chicago Cubs, and Tampa Bay Rays. He made his MLB debut in 2020 with the Cardinals.

== Amateur career ==
Woodford graduated from Plant High School in Tampa, Florida, where he played baseball and was teammates with Kyle Tucker. As a senior at Plant, Woodford was 7–0 with a 0.67 ERA. He committed to the University of Florida to play college baseball. He was drafted by the St. Louis Cardinals with the 39th overall pick in the 2015 Major League Baseball draft and signed, forgoing his commitment to Florida.

== Professional career ==
=== St. Louis Cardinals ===
Woodford made his professional debut with the rookie-level Gulf Coast League Cardinals and spent all of 2015 there, pitching to a 1–0 record and a 2.39 ERA in eight games. He spent the 2016 season with the Peoria Chiefs where was named a Midwest League All-Star and posted a 5–5 record with a 3.31 ERA and 82 strikeouts in 21 starts, and 2017 with the Palm Beach Cardinals, where he went 7–6 with a 3.10 ERA in 23 games (21 starts). Woodford was a non-roster invitee to 2018 spring training.

Woodford began the 2018 season with the Springfield Cardinals, with whom he was named a Texas League All-Star, and was promoted to the Memphis Redbirds during the season. In 16 starts for Springfield he compiled a 3–8 record with a 5.22 ERA, and in 12 starts for Memphis he was 5–5 with a 4.50 ERA. He returned to Memphis to begin 2019, earning Pacific Coast League All-Star honors. Over 26 starts for Memphis, Woodford went 9–8 with a 4.15 ERA, striking out 131 batters over 151 2/3 innings. Woodford was added to St. Louis' 40–man roster following the 2019 season.

On July 28, 2020, Woodford was promoted to the major leagues. On August 15, he made his major league debut against the Chicago White Sox, pitching three innings, giving up one earned run and striking out three. For the 2020 season, Woodford went 1-0 with a 5.57 ERA and 16 strikeouts over 21 innings.

In 2021, Woodford worked mainly as a reliever but also started 8 games in the second half. He went 3-4 with a 3.99 ERA and 50 strikeouts over 67 2/3 innings.

Woodford spent 2022 being recalled and optioned multiple times from the Memphis Redbirds, appearing in 11 games with the Redbirds (10 starts) and 27 games (1 start) with the Cardinals, where he went 4-0 with a 2.23 ERA across 48 1/3 innings.

He was reassigned to the minor leagues on October 9, 2022, and activated by the Cardinals again on January 17, 2023. On November 17, 2023, Woodford was non-tendered by the Cardinals.

=== Chicago White Sox ===
On January 10, 2024, Woodford signed a minor league contract with the Chicago White Sox. In 10 starts for the Triple–A Charlotte Knights, he recorded a 5.26 ERA with 42 strikeouts across 49 2/3 innings pitched. On May 28, Woodford was selected to the active roster following an injury to Mike Clevinger. In two starts for Chicago, he surrendered 10 runs on 15 hits with seven strikeouts across 8 1/3 innings. On June 7, Woodford was designated for assignment. He elected free agency after clearing waivers on June 9.

=== Pittsburgh Pirates ===
On June 10, 2024, Woodford signed a minor league contract with the Pittsburgh Pirates. In 7 starts for the Triple–A Indianapolis Indians, he recorded a 2.29 ERA with 37 strikeouts over 35 1/3 innings pitched. On July 30, the Pirates selected Woodford's contract, adding him to their active roster. In 6 games (4 starts) for Pittsburgh, he struggled to an 0–4 record and 6.95 ERA with 14 strikeouts over 22 innings of work. On August 26, Woodford was designated for assignment. He cleared waivers and was sent outright to Indianapolis on August 28. However, Woodford rejected the assignment and elected free agency the following day. On September 2, he re–signed with the team on a minor league contract. Woodford was selected to the major league roster on September 18. In a spot start against the St. Louis Cardinals, he pitched 4 2/3 innings and allowed 4 runs on 8 hits with 5 strikeouts. Woodford was designated for assignment by the Pirates the following day. He cleared waivers and was sent outright to Indianapolis on September 22. Woodford elected free agency on October 2.

=== New York Yankees ===
On January 12, 2025, Woodford signed a minor league contract with the Colorado Rockies. On March 23, Woodford exercised the opt-out clause in his contract and was released by the Rockies organization.

On March 24, 2025, Woodford signed a minor league contract with the New York Yankees organization. In 10 appearances (seven starts) for the Triple-A Scranton/Wilkes-Barre RailRiders, he logged a 2-2 record and 4.54 ERA with 39 strikeouts across 39 2/3 innings pitched. On June 1, Woodford opted out of his contract and became a free agent.

=== Chicago Cubs ===
On June 5, 2025, Woodford signed a minor league contract with the Chicago Cubs. In four appearances (three starts) for the Triple-A Iowa Cubs, he logged a 1-1 record and 4.57 ERA with 20 strikeouts across 21 2/3 innings pitched. Woodford was released by the Cubs organization on July 1, after triggering the opt-out clause in his contract.

=== Arizona Diamondbacks ===
On July 2, 2025, Woodford signed a major league contract with the Arizona Diamondbacks. In 22 relief appearances, he compiled an 0-4 record and 6.44 ERA with 23 strikeouts and three save across 36 1/3 innings pitched. On September 21, Woodford was designated for assignment following the promotion of Austin Pope. He cleared waivers and was sent outright to the Triple-A Reno Aces on September 23. Woodford elected free agency on October 1.

=== Milwaukee Brewers ===
On November 21, 2025, Woodford signed a minor league contract with the Tampa Bay Rays that included an invitation to major league spring training. On March 24, 2026, Woodford was traded to the Milwaukee Brewers in exchange for K. C. Hunt; he was subsequently added to Milwaukee's 40-man roster. He made 16 appearances for the team, struggling to a 6.94 ERA with 20 strikeouts and one save across 23 1/3 innings pitched. Woodford was designated for assignment by the Brewers on June 5. He elected free agency after clearing waivers on June 8. Woodford re-signed with Milwaukee on a minor league contract the following day. On July 1, Woodford exercised the opt-out clause in his contract and was released by Milwaukee.

=== Chicago Cubs (second stint) ===
On July 4, 2026, Woodford agreed to a major league contract with the Chicago Cubs. He pitched in one game for the Cubs and gave up three runs across two innings. On July 11, Woodford was designated for assignment by Chicago. He was sent outright to the Triple-A Iowa Cubs on July 14. On July 15, Woodford elected free agency rather than accept a minor league assignment. Two days later, he re-signed with Chicago on a minor league contract. On July 29, the Cubs added Woodford back to their active roster. He made two appearances for Chicago, allowing three runs on six hits over three innings pitched. Woodford was designated for assignment by the team on August 4; he elected free agency on August 7 in lieu of an outright assignment to Iowa.

=== Tampa Bay Rays ===
On August 10, 2026, Woodford signed a minor league contract with the Tampa Bay Rays. On September 24, the Rays promoted him to the major leagues and added him that day to the roster. However, after pitching and giving up 3 runs in 1 1/3 inning vs. the New York Yankees for a disastrous 20.25 ERA, he was DFA'd and sent down to the Durham Bulls. Woodford elected free agency on September 30. As he pitched for both the Brewers and the Rays, who both qualified for the 2026 World Series, Woodford is the only player guaranteed to get a World Series ring.
