= John Gant =

American baseball player (born 1992)

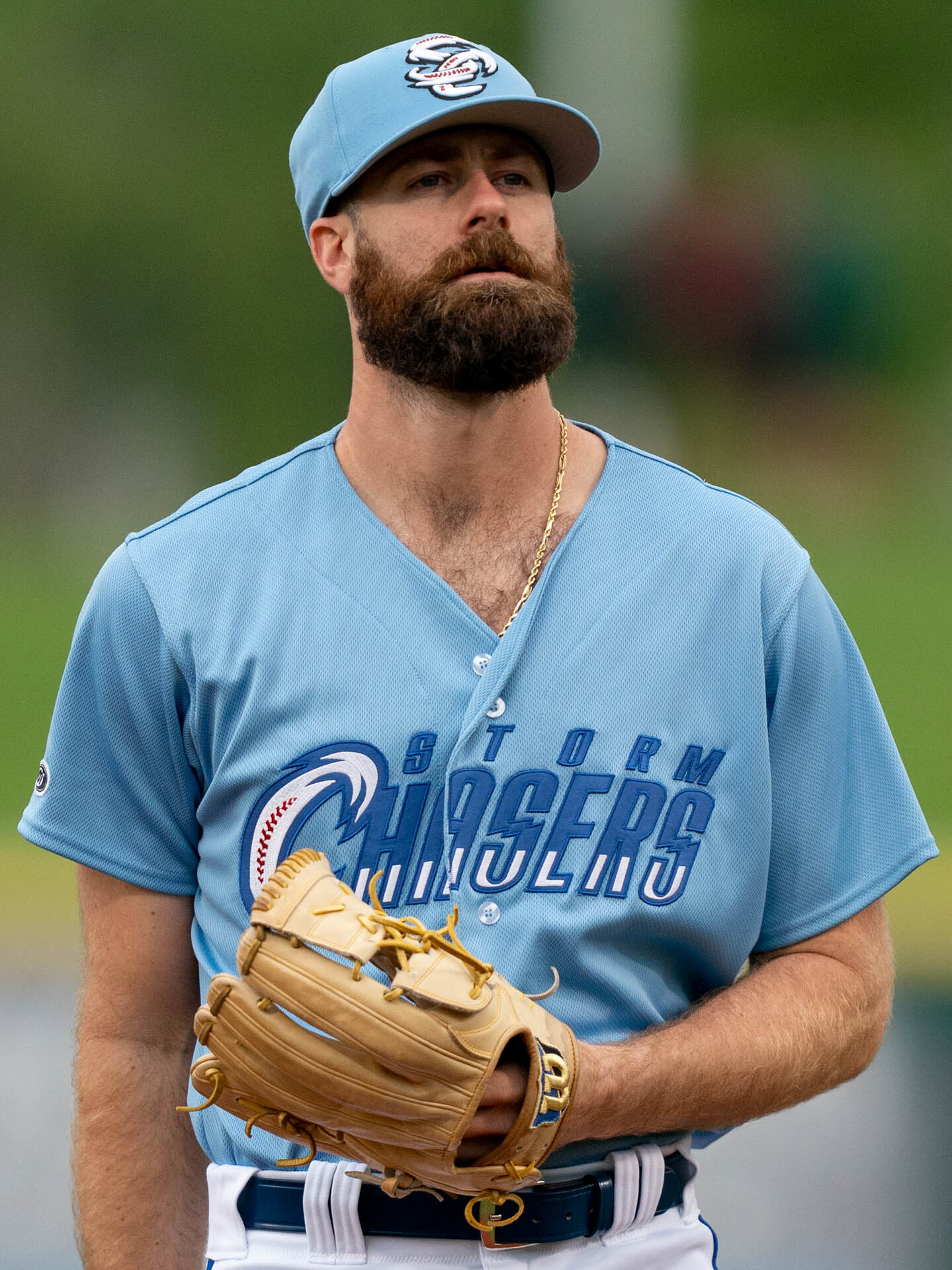
- Gant with the Omaha Storm Chasers in 2025

Wei Chuan Dragons – No. 33
- Pitcher
- Born: August 6, 1992 (age 34); Savannah, Georgia, U.S.
- Bats: Right Throws: Right

Professional debut
- MLB: April 6, 2016, for the Atlanta Braves
- CPBL: April 1, 2026, for the Wei Chuan Dragons

MLB statistics (through 2021 season)
- Win–loss record: 24–26
- Earned run average: 3.89
- Strikeouts: 325

CPBL statistics (through May 19, 2026)
- Win–loss record: 2–1
- Earned run average: 1.49
- Strikeouts: 38
- Stats at Baseball Reference

Teams
- Atlanta Braves (2016); St. Louis Cardinals (2017–2021); Minnesota Twins (2021); Wei Chuan Dragons (2026–present)

John Michael Gant (born August 6, 1992) is an American professional baseball pitcher for the Wei Chuan Dragons of the Chinese Professional Baseball League (CPBL). He has previously played in Major League Baseball (MLB) for the Atlanta Braves, St. Louis Cardinals, and Minnesota Twins.

== Early life ==
Gant was born and raised in Savannah, Georgia, before moving to Wesley Chapel, Florida, at the age of 11. He grew up an Atlanta Braves fan. Gant attended Wiregrass Ranch High School in Wesley Chapel. As a senior, he was 6–0 with a 1.90 ERA with two no-hitters and 107 strikeouts. He committed to play college baseball at Long Island University.

== Professional career ==
=== New York Mets ===
Gant was drafted by the New York Mets in the 21st round of the 2011 Major League Baseball draft out of Wiregrass Ranch High School. He signed with the Mets for $185,000, forgoing his commitment to Long Island, and made his professional debut with the rookie-level Gulf Coast League Mets, with whom he was 0–1 with a 6.48 ERA. Gant spent 2012 with the Kingsport Mets and pitched one game for the Savannah Sand Gnats, and with the two teams was a combined 3–4 with a 4.98 ERA. He played 2013 with the Brooklyn Cyclones where he was 6–4 with a 2.89 ERA in 13 starts and 2014 back with Savannah where he compiled an 11–5 record and 2.56 ERA in 12 starts. Gant began the 2015 season in the Binghamton Mets starting rotation, for whom he was 4–5 with a 4.70 ERA, He also started six games for the St. Lucie Mets.

=== Atlanta Braves ===
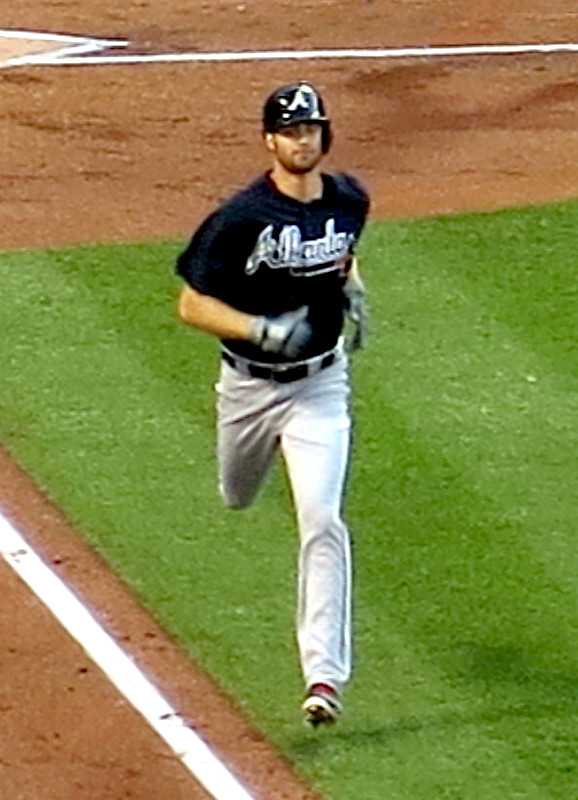
Gant with Atlanta Braves in 2016

On July 24, 2015, the Mets traded Gant and Rob Whalen to the Atlanta Braves for Juan Uribe and Kelly Johnson. He was assigned to the Mississippi Braves. In 24 games started between Binghamton, St. Lucie and Mississippi, he was 10–5 with a 3.08 ERA and 1.23 WHIP. The Braves added him to their 40-man roster after the season. Gant was invited to spring training to begin the 2016 season, and pitched well enough for the team to consider placing him in the major league bullpen, though Gant had worked primarily as a starter in the minor leagues. He pitched 15 1/3 innings and allowed four earned runs in spring training, making the Opening Day roster as a reliever.

Gant made his major league debut on April 6, 2016, pitching a scoreless ninth inning against the Washington Nationals, giving up one single and striking out one. Four days later, Gant was sent to the minor leagues, and placed in the Gwinnett Braves starting rotation. In subsequent call-ups to the major leagues, Gant pitched in relief. He and Casey Kelly were the two pitchers who spent the most time between the major and minor league levels in the beginning of the season, as the Braves tried balancing the needs of their bullpen against the possibility of overusing pitchers. Gant made his first major league start against the Chicago Cubs on June 12, yielding two earned runs and four hits in 4 1/3 innings, while taking the loss. Gant made his second start against the New York Mets on June 18, and earned a win. On June 27, Gant started against the Cleveland Indians. He was taken out of the game after straining his oblique and placed on the disabled list. Gant came off the DL on August 21, and was placed in the bullpen. A week later, he was optioned to Gwinnett to clear a roster spot for Aaron Blair, only to be recalled on August 30. In the majors in 2016, he was 1–4 with a 4.86 ERA, and in the minor leagues with the Rome Braves and Gwinnett Braves he was 3–3 with a 3.97 ERA in 13 games (ten starts).

=== St. Louis Cardinals ===
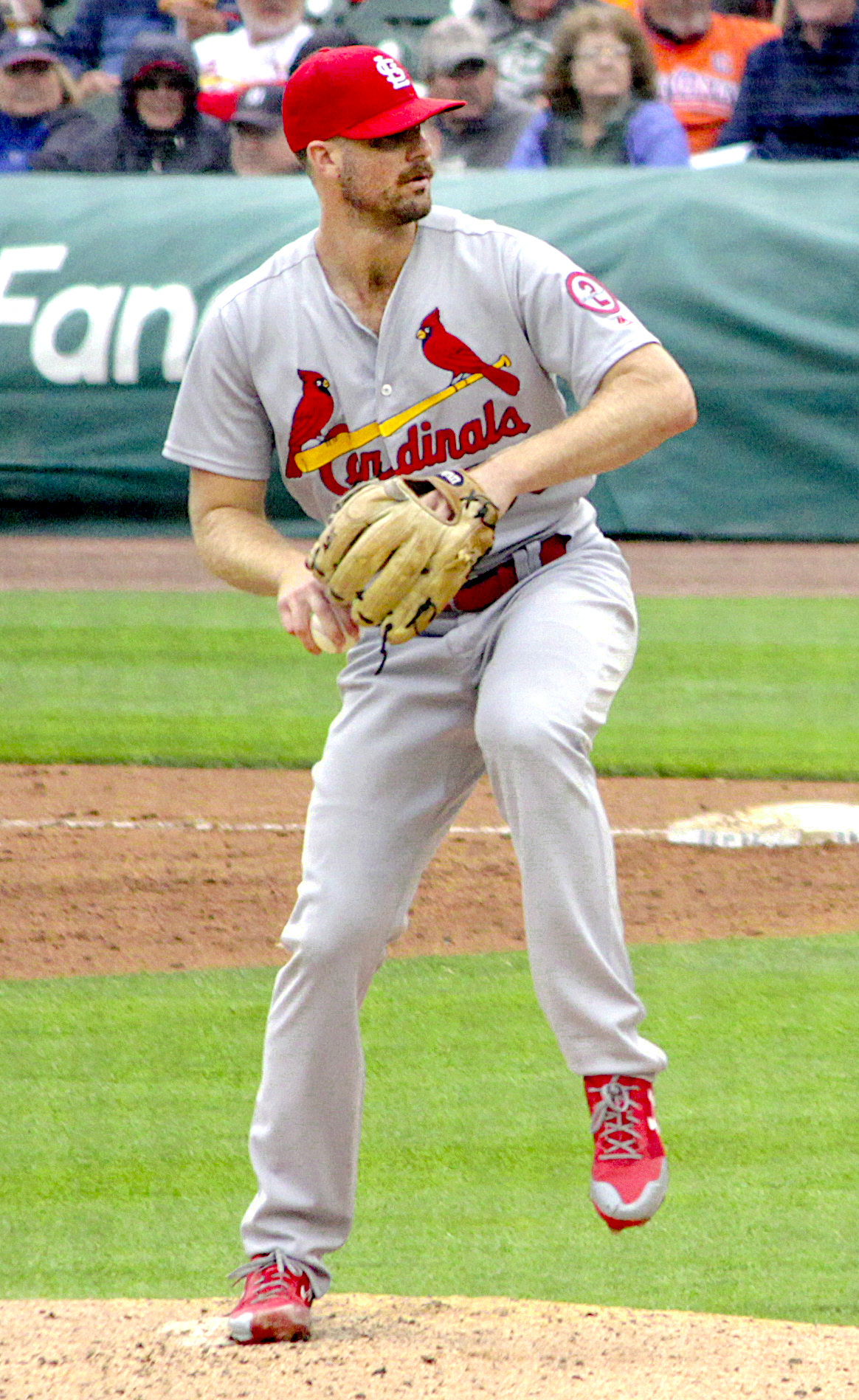
Gant in 2018

On December 1, 2016, the Braves traded Gant, Chris Ellis, and Luke Dykstra to the St. Louis Cardinals for Jaime García. He began the season with the Memphis Redbirds.

He was recalled to St. Louis before the game on May 31, after Jonathan Broxton was released. He was called up to St. Louis and reassigned to Memphis multiple times during the year. With St. Louis in 2017, he was 0–1 with a 4.67 ERA in 17.1 innings pitched, and with Memphis he was 6–5 with a 3.83 ERA in 18 starts.

Gant began 2018 with Memphis. He was recalled to St. Louis and optioned back to Memphis twice during the season before securing a spot in St. Louis' starting rotation after an injury to Michael Wacha in mid-June. Gant finished the 2018 season with a 7–6 record and a 3.47 ERA 26 games (19 starts).

Gant moved to St. Louis' bullpen for the 2019 season. During the first half of the season, Gant emerged as a reliable, late inning reliever, finishing the first half with a 2.22 ERA over 44 2/3 innings. However, he struggled following the All-Star break, compiling a 6.65 ERA over 21 2/3 innings. He finished the 2019 regular season leading all pitchers with 11 relief wins and recorded a 3.66 ERA, striking out sixty over 66 1/3 innings. He struggled in the second half of the season, and was subsequently left off of St. Louis' 2019 National League Division Series roster.

In 2020, Gant pitched to a 1.93 ERA and 2.13 FIP before landing on the injured list due to groin tightness on September 25, 2020, where he finished the season. Gant began 2021 as a member of the starting rotation.

=== Minnesota Twins ===
On July 30, 2021, Gant was traded to the Minnesota Twins along with Evan Sisk for J. A. Happ and cash. Gant made 14 appearances for the Twins, going 1–5 with a 5.61 ERA and 36 strikeouts. He was outrighted off of the 40-man roster following the season on November 8, 2021, but refused the outright assignment and elected free agency.

=== Hokkaido Nippon-Ham Fighters ===
On December 10, 2021, Gant signed with the Hokkaido Nippon-Ham Fighters of Nippon Professional Baseball. On November 29, 2022, Gant re-signed with the Fighters on a one-year contract extension. Gant dealt with injury, and never made an appearance for the main club during the 2022 or 2023 seasons. In 3 games for the farm team in 2023, his only action for the franchise, Gant logged an 0–2 record and 6.52 ERA with 11 strikeouts in 9 2/3 innings pitched. On July 1, 2023, Gant was released by the Fighters.

=== Long Island Ducks ===
On March 4, 2025, Gant signed with the Long Island Ducks of the Atlantic League of Professional Baseball. In four starts for the Ducks, Gant compiled a 2-1 record and 1.71 ERA with 27 strikeouts across 21 innings pitched.

=== Kansas City Royals ===
On May 17, 2025, Gant's contract was purchased by the Kansas City Royals. He made 19 starts for the Triple-A Omaha Storm Chasers, registering a 5-5 record and 6.00 ERA with 69 strikeouts over 81 innings of work. Gant elected free agency following the season on November 6.

=== Wei Chuan Dragons ===
On December 31, 2025, Gant signed with the Wei Chuan Dragons of the Chinese Professional Baseball League. During the regular season, Gant led the league in ERA (1.49) and strikeouts (136). He won Game 1 of the 2026 Taiwan Series against Mario Sanchez, who finished second in regular season strikeouts thrown. At the end of the season, Gant was named to the CPBL Best Nine as pitcher, and the league MVP.

== Pitching style ==
Gant's unconventional windup

Gant's pitching motion has repeatedly been characterized as "unique". He takes one step forward with his left foot, planting it on the right side of the mound, then moves backward, only to take the same step again before throwing the baseball. The extra movement, which Gant describes as a "false step", does not occur when he pitches from a set position.

Gant is also known for his use of the vulcan changeup.
