= Alex Reyes =

American baseball player (born 1994)

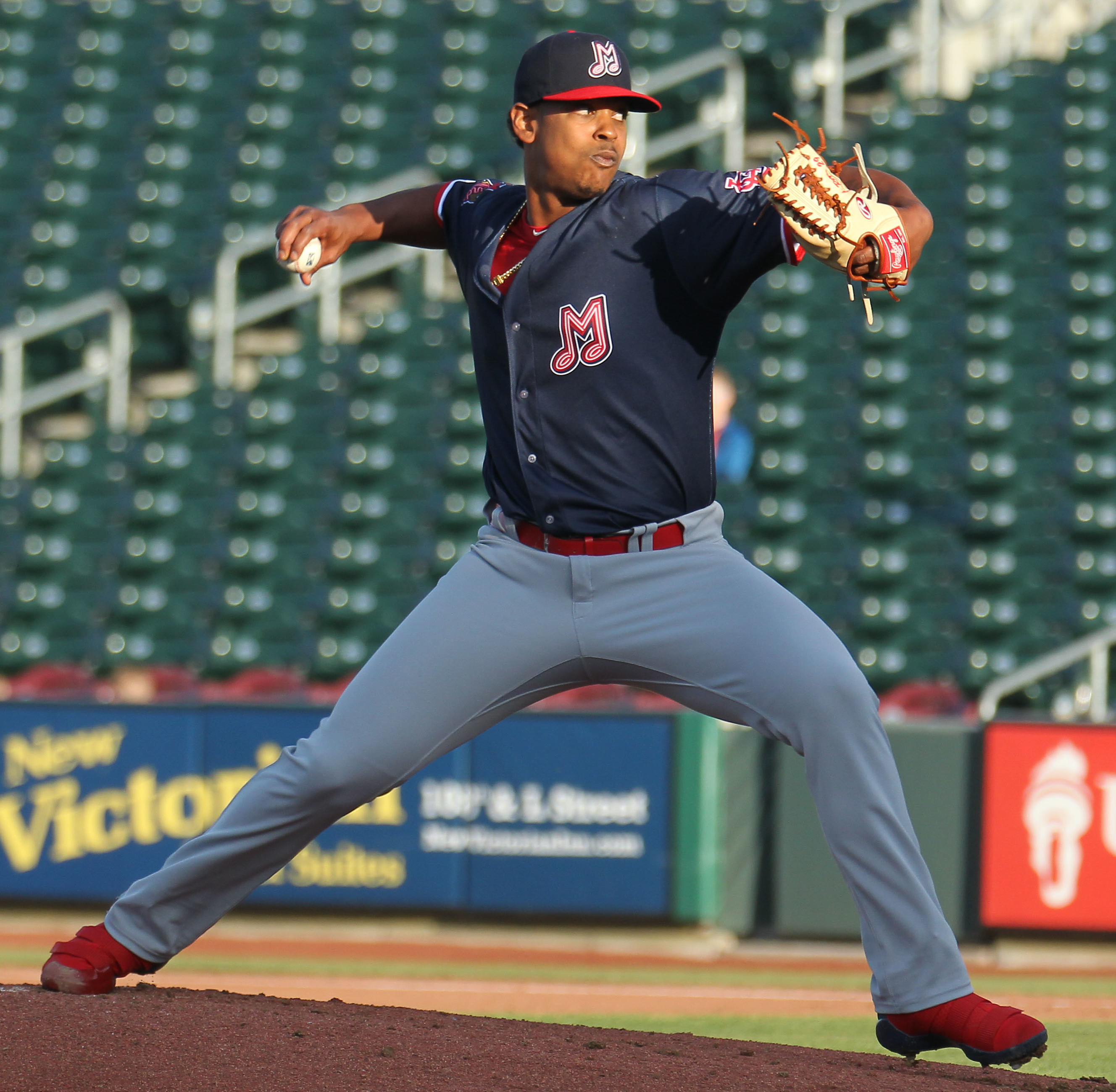
- Reyes with the Memphis Redbirds in 2019
- Pitcher
- Born: August 29, 1994 (age 32); Elizabeth, New Jersey, U.S.
- Batted: Right Threw: Right

MLB debut
- August 9, 2016, for the St. Louis Cardinals

Last MLB appearance
- October 3, 2021, for the St. Louis Cardinals

MLB statistics
- Win–loss record: 16–11
- Earned run average: 2.86
- Strikeouts: 177
- Saves: 31
- Stats at Baseball Reference

Teams
- St. Louis Cardinals (2016, 2018–2021)

Career highlights and awards
- All-Star (2021)

Alexander Reyes (born August 29, 1994) is a Dominican–American former professional baseball pitcher. He was signed by the St. Louis Cardinals as an amateur free agent in 2012, and made his Major League Baseball (MLB) debut with the team in 2016.

The Cardinals' top prospect entering both the 2015 and 2016 seasons, Baseball America named him the second-best prospect overall in their 2016 mid-season ranking. He has played in two All-Star Futures Games and was one of two Cardinals' Co-Minor League Pitchers of the Year in 2015.

In 2021 Reyes set the MLB record for most consecutive saves to start a career and was named to the 2021 National League All-Star team, but, due to injuries, has not pitched professionally since that season.

== Early life ==
Born in Elizabeth, New Jersey, to Tomás Sr. and Dignora Reyes, Alexander Reyes is the youngest of three sons, including Tomás Jr. and Adriel. While he was attending Elizabeth High School, he was 5 ft 11 in (1.80 m) and threw a maximum of 87 miles per hour (140 km/h). He lived in New Jersey until he was 18. With his family unable to afford to send him to showcases and tryouts, he moved to the Dominican Republic in December 2011. There, it would be much easier to gain the attention of scouts to increase his chances of signing with a Major League Baseball (MLB) team as a free agent rather than be selected through the amateur draft had he remained in the United States.

In the Dominican Republic, Reyes lived with each of his grandmothers in San Cristóbal, enabling him to gain residency and the notice of scouts, known colloquially as buscones. Shortstop Raúl A. Mondesí, the son of San Cristóbal mayor and former MLB outfielder Raúl Mondesí, worked out with Reyes and attracted the attention of a buscón known simply as Valera, who also noticed Reyes. Reyes tried out with Valera before St. Louis Cardinals scout Rodny Jiménez noticed him. The Cardinals observed Reyes work out in Palenque, of the Sabana Grande de Palenque municipality, near San Cristóbal, and invited him for a private workout in their team academy in Santo Domingo. At that point, he had reached speeds of up to 94 miles per hour (151 km/h). Cardinals general manager John Mozeliak commented that Reyes' athleticism was one important factor that caused the team to consider the young pitcher. Because he had emigrated from the United States, MLB regulations stated that Reyes must wait one year to sign with an MLB franchise as an international free agent, delaying the Cardinals' opportunity to sign him for six months. In December 2012, he signed a $950,000 deal with St. Louis.

== Professional career ==
=== St. Louis Cardinals ===
==== Minor Leagues ====
Reyes made his professional debut in 2013 for the Johnson City Cardinals of the Appalachian League. In 12 starts, he went 6–4 with a 3.39 earned run average (ERA) with 68 strikeouts (SO) in 58 1/3 innings pitched (IP).

Prior to the 2014 season, Baseball America ranked him as the seventh-best prospect in the Cardinals organization. Also, Baseball Prospectus determined him the 98th-best prospect in all of baseball. He spent the 2014 season with the Single-A Peoria Chiefs of the Midwest League. There, he notched a 7–7 record to go with a 3.62 ERA and 137 strikeouts in 109 1/3 innings. He said: "I learn from watching. I don't think ... he even knows, but Rob Kaminsky is definitely the number one guy I've studied. From day one in Peoria he just separated himself from everyone on the pitching staff, including me."

Prior to the start of the 2015 season, Baseball America ranked Reyes as the 51st-best prospect in all professional baseball, and Baseball Prospectus ranked him 55th. Jim Callis selected Reyes as the Cardinals' top prospect for 2015, and although he did not make MLB.com's top 100, Callis named him the best pitching prospect not on that list. The beneficiary of a late growth spurt, Reyes grew to a height of 6 ft 4 in (1.93 m) and began throwing at up to 100 miles per hour (160 km/h) in Single–A.

Playing for the High–A Palm Beach Cardinals of the Florida State League (FSL) in 2015, Reyes was the Cardinals' Minor League Pitcher of the month in April. He led the FSL with 35 SO and allowed a 1.71 ERA over 20 1/3 innings. His 13-strikeout performance on June 17 was a season-high. Including his previous 10 outings, he had posted a 1.79 ERA and 70 SO in 50 1/3 innings. On June 25, Reyes was selected to represent the World Team in the All-Star Futures Game after leading all of the minor leagues with a ratio of 13.4 strikeouts per nine innings pitched (SO/9). He had registered a 2–5 record and 2.08 ERA while striking out 90 and walking 30 in 60 2/3 IP. He was also selected to play in the 2015 FSL mid-season All-Star game.

With a 2.26 ERA, 49 hits and zero home runs allowed with 96 strikeouts in 63 2/3 innings over 13 FSL starts, the Cardinals promoted Reyes to the Double–A Springfield Cardinals of the Texas League in July 2015. The next month, Baseball America rated him as throwing the FSL's best fastball, best breaking pitch, and as the "best pitching prospect" in the league in 2015, according to a poll of managers and coaches. He totaled a 5–7 record and 2.49 ERA over 22 starts in 2015, striking out 151 in 101 1/3 innings while allowing a .197 opposing batting average. The Cardinals selected him to play for the Surprise Saguaros of the off-season Arizona Fall League (AFL). Baseball America also selected Reyes for the high Class-A minor leagues All-Star team for the 2015 season. He and Austin Gomber were selected the Cardinals' co-Minor League Pitchers of the Year for 2015. After he tested positive for marijuana, Major League Baseball announced on November 9, 2015, that they were suspending Reyes for 50 games including the remainder of the AFL season and the start of the 2016 season.

Baseball America selected Reyes as the top Cardinals' prospect entering the 2016 season. MLB.com ranked him as the tenth-best prospect in all the minor leagues, and Baseball Prospectus at number 13.

Reyes was activated from his suspension on May 22 to make his first start for the Memphis Redbirds of the Triple–A Pacific Coast League. Baseball America moved his rank to second of all prospects in baseball in their 2016 mid-season update. Selected to play his second All-Star Futures Game for 2016 at Petco Park in San Diego, Reyes was the starting pitcher for the World team, striking out four of the five outs he recorded as World won, 11−3. His 2016 totals with Memphis included a 2−3 record, 4.96 ERA, 93 strikeouts and 32 walks in 65 innings.

==== 2016 ====
The Cardinals purchased Reyes' contract on August 9, 2016, and added him to the major league roster to serve as a relief pitcher. He made his major league debut the same night against the Cincinnati Reds, pitching a perfect inning and striking out fellow rookie Adam Duvall for his first in the major leagues. Reyes earned his first major league win on August 13, 2016, against the Chicago Cubs, and first save on August 19 against the Philadelphia Phillies. After five appearances and 9 1/3 innings in relief with 13 strikeouts and no runs surrendered, he made his first MLB start on August 27 against the Oakland Athletics. He completed 4 2/3 innings, allowing one run, two hits and four walks while striking out four. The first run charged to Reyes in his major league career occurred when reliever Zach Duke walked Khris Davis with the bases loaded to score Bruce Maxwell in the fifth, ending 14 consecutive scoreless innings. The Athletics won, 3−2.

The Cardinals, attempting to make the playoffs, called upon Reyes to start against fellow contenders, including seven scoreless innings against San Francisco on September 23 and, in his next outing, three runs in five innings against Chicago. As a starting pitcher, Reyes was credited with a 4−1 record; his only loss came against the Pittsburgh Pirates on September 7. He completed 17 1/3 relief innings, surrendering one earned run and eight hits while striking out 23. In 46 total innings with St. Louis in 2016, Reyes struck out 52; his 1.57 ERA ranked second among all major league rookie relief pitchers with at least 20 innings.

==== 2017 ====
On February 14, 2017, Reyes was diagnosed with a partial tear of his ulnar collateral ligament in his right elbow. The next day, it was announced Reyes would undergo Tommy John surgery, shelving him for the entire 2017 season. He had successful surgery on February 16.

==== 2018 ====
After sitting out all of 2017, Reyes began rehabbing in 2018. In a rehab start on May 19 with the Springfield Cardinals he pitched 7 2/3 scoreless innings, allowing only one hit and striking out 13, tying Springfield's team record. On May 24 during a rehab start with the Memphis Redbirds, Reyes struck out nine consecutive batters, making him the first pitcher in Pacific Coast League history to strike out nine batters in a row. In four total rehab starts between Springfield, the Peoria Chiefs, Palm Beach Cardinals and Memphis, he pitched 23 scoreless innings in which he struck out 44, walked seven, and gave up only seven hits.

Reyes was activated from the 60-day DL on May 30 to start against the Milwaukee Brewers. Making his first major league appearance since September 29, 2016, Reyes pitched four scoreless innings, allowing three hits while walking two and striking out two. He was placed on the 10-day DL the next day with a right lat strain that he suffered during his start against Milwaukee. On June 6, Reyes underwent surgery for a torn tendon in his lat muscle, effectively ending his season.

==== 2019 ====
Reyes entered the 2019 season and began the year in St. Louis' bullpen. However, in his first three innings of the year, he allowed five runs and six walks and was ultimately optioned to the Class AAA Memphis Redbirds on April 7.

==== 2020 ====
Reyes rejoined the Cardinals for the pandemic-shortened 2020 season and posted a 2–1 record with a 3.20 ERA and 27 strikeouts in 19 2/3 innings.

==== 2021 ====
Prior to the start of the 2021 season, Reyes was named the Cardinals' closer. After pitching to a 1.12 ERA and 20 saves (one of only two in the major leagues to not blow a save) over 40 1/3 innings, he was named to the 2021 Major League Baseball All-Star Game. On July 18, he set the MLB record for most consecutive saves to begin a career, with 24. After pitching to a 1.52 ERA over the first half of the season, Reyes struggled in the second half, going 5–5 with a 5.52 ERA over 31 innings, and was eventually removed from the closer role.

In the 2021 National League Wild Card Game, Reyes gave up a two-out, two-run, walk-off home run to Chris Taylor in the bottom of the ninth inning.

==== 2022 ====
Reyes was placed on the 60-day injured list to begin the season on March 25, 2022, after struggling with a shoulder issue in Spring Training and receiving a stem-cell injection. On May 23, it was announced that Reyes would require shoulder surgery and miss the entire season. He was non-tendered and became a free agent on November 18.

=== Los Angeles Dodgers ===
On February 16, 2023, Reyes signed a one-year, $1.1 million contract with the Los Angeles Dodgers. On June 11, it was announced that Reyes had undergone surgery on his right shoulder and would not pitch during the 2023 season. The Dodgers declined his 2024 option after the season, making him a free agent.

== Pitching profile ==
The pitches which Reyes regularly throws are a fastball which regularly reaches 100 miles per hour (160 km/h), a power curveball, and a changeup. Noted to have prodigious lateral and horizontal movement, the fastball typically ranges from 94 miles per hour (151 km/h) to 97 miles per hour (156 km/h), making it very difficult for batters to hit solidly. It is most effective high in the strike zone. The curveball has been called a "wipeout" pitch with a vertical falling pattern following the points from "12-to-6" on the clock, making it equally difficult for batters to hit well. The combination of both the fastball and curveball contributes to the significantly-above normal strikeout rates. Reyes typically throws both pitches for strikes, although his command of the fastball was below average. The changeup will need increased refinement. His walk rate is higher than normal, but he gave up just one total home run in 2015. In 2016, Baseball Prospectus pronounced that Reyes "has one of the highest ceilings of any current pitching prospect."

== Personal life ==
Reyes has a daughter who was born in July 2016.

== Awards ==
- Baseball America Minor Leagues Classification All-Star (2015)
- Baseball America Best Tools – Florida State League (2015):
  - Best pitching prospect
  - Best fastball
  - Best breaking pitch
- Florida State League Mid-season All-Star (2015)
- 2× Major League Baseball All-Star Futures Game (2015, 2016)
- St. Louis Cardinals Minor Leagues Pitcher of the Month (April 2015)
- St. Louis Cardinals Minor Leagues Pitcher of the Year (2015)

== See also ==
- List of baseball players who underwent Tommy John surgery
