= 2020 Pittsburgh Pirates season =

2020 Pittsburgh Pirates
- League: National League
- Division: Central
- Ballpark: PNC Park
- City: Pittsburgh, Pennsylvania
- Record: 19–41 (.317)
- Divisional place: 5th
- Owners: Bob Nutting
- General managers: Ben Cherington
- Managers: Derek Shelton
- Television: AT&T SportsNet Pittsburgh
- Radio: KDKA-FM; Pittsburgh Pirates Radio Network (Greg Brown, Joe Block, Bob Walk, John Wehner, Michael McKenry)
- Stats: ESPN.com; Baseball Reference

The 2020 Pittsburgh Pirates season was the franchise's 139th season overall, 134th season as a member of the National League, and 20th season at PNC Park.

On March 12, 2020, MLB announced that because of the ongoing COVID-19 pandemic, the start of the regular season would be delayed by at least two weeks in addition to the remainder of spring training being cancelled. Four days later, it was announced that the start of the season would be pushed back indefinitely due to the recommendation made by the CDC to restrict events of more than 50 people for eight weeks. On June 23, commissioner Rob Manfred unilaterally implemented a 60-game season. Players reported to training camps on July 1 to resume spring training and prepare for a July 24 Opening Day.

The Pirates finished the season with an MLB worst record of 19–41. The team's .317 winning percentage was their worst since 1952. The Pirates technically set an MLB record for the fewest games won in any official season, finishing with one less win than the notorious 1899 Cleveland Spiders, although the 1899 Spiders played 154 games. Because of the shortened season, and a winning percentage of .317 winning percentage being roughly equivalent to a 51–111 record in a 162-game season, the 19 wins is not generally recognized as one of baseball's worst records.

== Season standings ==
=== National League Central ===
NL Central
Team	W	L	Pct.	GB	Home	Road
Chicago Cubs	34	26	.567	—	19‍–‍14	15‍–‍12
St. Louis Cardinals	30	28	.517	3	14‍–‍13	16‍–‍15
Cincinnati Reds	31	29	.517	3	16‍–‍13	15‍–‍16
Milwaukee Brewers	29	31	.483	5	15‍–‍14	14‍–‍17
Pittsburgh Pirates	19	41	.317	15	13‍–‍19	6‍–‍22

=== National League playoff standings ===
Division leaders
Team	W	L	Pct.
Los Angeles Dodgers	43	17	.717
Atlanta Braves	35	25	.583
Chicago Cubs	34	26	.567

Division 2nd place
Team	W	L	Pct.
San Diego Padres	37	23	.617
St. Louis Cardinals	30	28	.517
Miami Marlins	31	29	.517

Wild Card teams (Top 2 teams qualify for postseason)
Team	W	L	Pct.	GB
Cincinnati Reds	31	29	.517	+2
Milwaukee Brewers	29	31	.483	—
San Francisco Giants	29	31	.483	—
Philadelphia Phillies	28	32	.467	1
Washington Nationals	26	34	.433	3
New York Mets	26	34	.433	3
Colorado Rockies	26	34	.433	3
Arizona Diamondbacks	25	35	.417	4
Pittsburgh Pirates	19	41	.317	10

=== Record vs. opponents ===
2020 National League record Source: MLB Standings Grid – 2020
Team	CHC	CIN	MIL	PIT	STL	AL
Chicago	—	6–4	5–5	6–4	5–5	12–8
Cincinnati	4–6	—	6–4	7–3	4–6	10–10
Milwaukee	5–5	4–6	—	5–5	5–5	10–10
Pittsburgh	4–6	3–7	5–5	—	4–6	3–17
St. Louis	5–5	6–4	5–5	6–4	—	8–10

=== Detailed records ===
NL Central
Opponent	W	L	WP	RS	RA
Chicago Cubs	4	6	0.400	34	38
Cincinnati Reds	3	7	0.300	27	46
Milwaukee Brewers	5	5	0.500	54	49
Pittsburgh Pirates					
St. Louis Cardinals	4	6	0.400	33	39
Total	16	24	0.400	148	172
AL Central
Chicago White Sox	1	3	0.250	9	26
Cleveland Indians	1	5	0.167	21	26
Detroit Tigers	0	3	0.000	19	30
Kansas City Royals	0	3	0.000	7	22
Minnesota Twins	1	3	0.250	15	22
Total	3	17	0.150	71	126
Season Total	19	41	0.317	219	298

Month	Games	Won	Lost	Win %	RS	RA
July	7	2	5	0.286	26	36
August	25	8	17	0.320	102	137
September	28	9	19	0.321	91	125
Total	60	19	41	0.317	219	298

	Games	Won	Lost	Win %	RS	RA
Home	32	13	19	0.406	129	154
Away	28	6	22	0.214	90	144
Total	60	19	41	0.317	219	298

== Game log ==
2020 Game Log: 19–41 (Home: 13–19; Away: 6–22)
**July: 2–5 (Home: 1–2; Away: 1–3)**

#	Date	Opponent	Score	Win	Loss	Save	Record	Streak
1	July 24	@ Cardinals	4–5	Flaherty (1–0)	**Musgrove** (0–1)	Kim (1)	0–1	L1
2	July 25	@ Cardinals	1–9	Wainwright (1–0)	**Williams** (0–1)	—	0–2	L2
3	July 26	@ Cardinals	5–1	**Keller** (1–0)	Hudson (0–1)	—	1–2	W1
4	July 27	Brewers	5–6 (11)	Phelps (1–0)	**Neverauskas** (0–1)	—	1–3	L1
5	July 28	Brewers	8–6	**Hartlieb** (1–0)	Wahl (0–1)	**Burdi** (1)	2–3	W1
6	July 29	Brewers	0–3	Woodruff (1–1)	**Musgrove** (0–2)	Hader (1)	2–4	L1
7	July 31	@ Cubs	3–6	Darvish (1–1)	**Williams** (0–2)	—	2–5	L2

**August: 8–17 (Home: 4–7; Away: 4–10)**

#	Date	Opponent	Score	Win	Loss	Save	Record	Streak
8	August 1	@ Cubs	3–4	Chatwood (2–0)	**Keller** (1–1)	Wick (1)	2–6	L3
9	August 2	@ Cubs	1–2 (11)	Jeffress (1–0)	**Ponce** (0–1)	—	2–7	L4
10	August 3	@ Twins	4–5	Rogers (1–0)	**Burdi** (0–1)	—	2–8	L5
11	August 4	@ Twins	3–7	Berríos (1–1)	**Musgrove** (0–3)	May (1)	2–9	L6
12	August 5	Twins	2–5	Dobnak (2–1)	**Williams** (0–3)	—	2–10	L7
13	August 6	Twins	6–5	**Howard** (1–0)	Rogers (1–1)	—	3–10	W1
14	August 7	Tigers	13–17 (11)	Garcia (2–0)	**Neverauskas** (0–2)	—	3–11	L1
15	August 8	Tigers	5–11	Nova (1–0)	**Holland** (0–1)	—	3–12	L2
16	August 9	Tigers	1–2	Turnbull (2–0)	**Rodríguez** (0–1)	Jiménez (5)	3–13	L3
—	August 10	@ Cardinals	**Postponed (COVID-19)** (Makeup date: August 27)					
—	August 11	@ Cardinals	**Postponed (COVID-19)** (Makeup date: August 27)					
—	August 12	@ Cardinals	**Postponed (COVID-19)** (Makeup date: September 18)					
17	August 13	@ Reds	9–6	**Williams** (1–3)	DeSclafani (1–1)	—	4–13	W1
18	August 14	@ Reds	1–8	Gray (4–1)	**Kuhl** (0–1)	—	4–14	L1
—	August 15	@ Reds	**Postponed (COVID-19)** (Makeup date: September 4)					
—	August 16	@ Reds	**Postponed (COVID-19)** (Makeup date: September 14)					
19	August 18	Indians	3–6 (10)	Wittgren (1–0)	**Howard** (1–1)	Hand (6)	4–15	L2
20	August 19	Indians	1–6	Civale (3–2)	**Neverauskas** (0–3)	—	4–16	L3
21	August 20	Indians	0–2	Bieber (5–0)	**Williams** (1–4)	Hand (7)	4–17	L4
22	August 21	Brewers	7–2	**Kuhl** (1–1)	Houser (1–2)	—	5–17	W1
23	August 22	Brewers	12–5	**Holland** (1–1)	Lindblom (1–1)	—	6–17	W2
24	August 23	Brewers	5–4	**Stratton** (1–0)	Phelps (2–3)	**Rodríguez** (1)	7–17	W3
25	August 25	@ White Sox	0–4	Giolito (3–2)	**Brault** (0–1)	—	7–18	L1
26	August 26	@ White Sox	3–10	Keuchel (5–2)	**Williams** (1–5)	—	7–19	L2
27	August 27 (1)	@ Cardinals	4–3 (8)	**Stratton** (2–0)	Gant (0–2)	**Rodríguez** (2)	8–19	W1
28	August 27 (2)	@ Cardinals	2–0 (7)	**Ponce** (1–1)	Oviedo (0–1)	**Turley** (1)	9–19	W2
29	August 28	@ Brewers	1–9	Burnes (1–0)	**Holland** (1–2)	—	9–20	L1
30	August 29	@ Brewers	6–7	Williams (2–1)	**Rodríguez** (0–2)	—	9–21	L2
31	August 30	@ Brewers	5–1	**Tropeano** (1–0)	Woodruff (2–3)	—	10–21	W1
32	August 31	@ Brewers	5–6	Williams (3–1)	**Turley** (0–1)	Hader (8)	10–22	L1

**September: 9–19 (Home: 8–10; Away: 1–9)**

#	Date	Opponent	Score	Win	Loss	Save	Record	Streak
33	September 1	Cubs	7–8 (11)	Jeffress (3–1)	**Crick** (0–1)	—	10–23	L2
34	September 2	Cubs	2–8	Hendricks (4–4)	**Musgrove** (0–4)	—	10–24	L3
35	September 3	Cubs	6–2	**Brubaker** (1–0)	Mills (3–3)	—	11–24	W1
36	September 4 (1)	Reds	2–4 (7)	Castillo (1–5)	**Brault** (0–2)	Iglesias (5)	11–25	L1
37	September 4 (2)	@ Reds	4–3 (7)	**Howard** (2–1)	Bauer (3–3)	**Rodríguez** (3)	12–25	W1
38	September 5	Reds	2–6	Garrett (1–0)	**Williams** (1–6)	—	12–26	L1
39	September 6	Reds	3–2	**Rodríguez** (1–2)	Iglesias (2–3)	—	13–26	W1
40	September 8	White Sox	5–4	**Rodríguez** (2–2)	Detwiler (1–1)	—	14–26	W2
41	September 9	White Sox	1–8	Dunning (1–0)	**Brubaker** (1–1)	—	14–27	L1
42	September 11	@ Royals	3–4	Bubic (1–5)	**Brault** (0–3)	Holland (4)	14–28	L2
43	September 12	@ Royals	4–7	Zimmer (1–0)	**Williams** (1–7)	Holland (5)	14–29	L3
44	September 13	@ Royals	0–11	Keller (4–2)	**Kuhl** (1–2)	—	14–30	L4
45	September 14 (1)	@ Reds	1–3 (7)	Iglesias (3–3)	**Howard** (2–2)	—	14–31	L5
46	September 14 (2)	@ Reds	4–9 (7)	Romano (1–0)	**Turley** (0–2)	—	14–32	L6
47	September 15	@ Reds	1–4	Lorenzen (2–1)	**Musgrove** (0–5)	Garrett (1)	14–33	L7
48	September 16	@ Reds	0–1	Castillo (3–5)	**Brubaker** (1–2)	Iglesias (8)	14–34	L8
49	September 17	Cardinals	5–1	**Brault** (1–3)	Gomber (0–1)	—	15–34	W1
50	September 18 (1)	Cardinals	5–6 (7)	Reyes (2–1)	**Williams** (1–8)	Helsley (1)	15–35	L1
51	September 18 (2)	@ Cardinals	2–7 (7)	Miller (1–1)	**Kuhl** (1–3)	—	15–36	L2
52	September 19	Cardinals	4–5	Woodford (1–0)	**Howard** (2–3)	Cabrera (1)	15–37	L3
53	September 20	Cardinals	1–2	Flaherty (4–2)	**Holland** (1–3)	Miller (3)	15–38	L4
54	September 21	Cubs	0–5	Lester (2–1)	**Brubaker** (1–3)	—	15–39	L5
55	September 22	Cubs	3–2	**Rodríguez** (3–2)	Chafin (1–2)	—	16–39	W1
56	September 23	Cubs	2–1	**Williams** (2–8)	Hendricks (6–5)	**Rodríguez** (4)	17–39	W2
57	September 24	Cubs	7–0	**Kuhl** (2–3)	Mills (5–5)	—	18–39	W3
58	September 25	@ Indians	3–4	Plutko (2–2)	**Stratton** (2–1)	—	18–40	L1
59	September 26	@ Indians	8–0	**Musgrove** (1–5)	Civale (4–6)	—	19–40	W1
60	September 27	@ Indians	6–8	Karinchak (1–2)	**Turley** (0–3)	Hand (16)	19–41	L1

Legend: = Win = Loss = Postponement
Bold = Pirates team member

== Roster ==
2020 Pittsburgh Pirates
Roster
Pitchers: 67 Tyler Bashlor; 43 Steven Brault; 65 J. T. Brubaker; 57 Nick Burdi; 62 Blake Cederlind; 30 Kyle Crick; 75 Austin Davis; 63 Miguel Del Pozo; 56 Robbie Erlin; 49 Michael Feliz; 32 Geoff Hartlieb; 45 Derek Holland; 52 Clay Holmes; 54 Sam Howard; 35 Keone Kela; 23 Mitch Keller; 39 Chad Kuhl; 70 Nick Mears; 59 Joe Musgrove; 66 Dovydas Neverauskas; 60 Cody Ponce; 38 Yacksel Ríos; 48 Richard Rodríguez; 46 Chris Stratton; 72 Nick Tropeano; 71 Nik Turley; 68 Brandon Waddell; 34 Trevor Williams	Catchers: 18 John Ryan Murphy; 58 Jacob Stallings; 80 Andrew Susac; Infielders: 55 Josh Bell; 31 Will Craig; 64 Phillip Evans; 26 Adam Frazier; 2 Erik González; 13 Ke'Bryan Hayes; 19 Colin Moran; 27 Kevin Newman; 36 José Osuna; 15 J. T. Riddle	Outfielders: 6 Anthony Alford; 6 Jarrod Dyson; 5 Guillermo Heredia; 51 Jason Martin; 76 Jared Oliva; 25 Gregory Polanco; 10 Bryan Reynolds; 3 Cole Tucker	Manager: 17 Derek Shelton; Coaches: 86 Heberto Andrade (coaching assistant); 16 Tarrik Brock (first base); 89 Jordan Comadena (bullpen catcher); 28 Joey Cora (third base); 41 Rick Eckstein (hitting); 12 Don Kelly (bench); 47 Oscar Marin (pitching); 87 Justin Meccage (bullpen); 85 Mike Rabelo (assistant hitting); 53 Glenn Sherlock (coach)

== Player stats ==
=== Batting ===
Note: G = Games played; AB = At bats; R = Runs; H = Hits; 2B = Doubles; 3B = Triples; HR = Home runs; RBI = Runs batted in; SB = Stolen bases; BB = Walks; AVG = Batting average; SLG = Slugging average

Player	G	AB	R	H	2B	3B	HR	RBI	SB	BB	AVG	SLG
Adam Frazier	58	209	22	48	7	0	7	23	1	17	.230	.364
Josh Bell	57	195	22	44	3	0	8	22	0	22	.226	.364
Bryan Reynolds	55	185	24	35	6	2	7	19	1	21	.189	.357
Erik González	50	181	14	41	13	1	3	20	2	8	.227	.359
Colin Moran	52	178	28	44	10	0	10	23	0	19	.247	.472
Gregory Polanco	50	157	12	24	6	0	7	22	3	13	.153	.325
Kevin Newman	44	156	12	35	5	0	1	10	0	12	.224	.276
Jacob Stallings	42	125	13	31	7	0	3	18	0	15	.248	.376
Cole Tucker	37	109	17	24	3	0	1	8	1	5	.220	.275
Ke'Bryan Hayes	24	85	17	32	7	2	5	11	1	9	.376	.682
José Osuna	26	78	6	16	3	0	4	11	0	4	.205	.397
J. T. Riddle	23	67	8	10	2	0	1	1	1	2	.149	.224
John Ryan Murphy	25	58	6	10	2	0	0	2	0	4	.172	.207
Jarrod Dyson	21	51	6	8	0	0	0	5	4	4	.157	.157
Phillip Evans	11	39	6	14	2	0	1	9	0	5	.359	.487
Guillermo Heredia	8	16	2	3	0	0	0	2	1	2	.188	.188
Jared Oliva	6	16	0	3	0	0	0	0	1	0	.188	.188
Anthony Alford	5	12	2	3	0	1	1	4	0	1	.250	.667
Jason Martin	7	9	2	0	0	0	0	0	0	2	.000	.000
Will Craig	2	4	0	0	0	0	0	0	0	0	.000	.000
Andrew Susac	1	2	0	0	0	0	0	0	0	2	.000	.000
Team totals	60	1932	219	425	76	6	59	210	16	167	.220	.275

=== Pitching ===
Note: W = Wins; L = Losses; ERA = Earned run average; G = Games pitched; GS = Games started; SV = Saves; IP = Innings pitched; H = Hits allowed; R = Runs allowed; ER = Earned runs allowed; BB = Walks allowed; SO = Strikeouts

Player	W	L	ERA	G	GS	SV	IP	H	R	ER	BB	SO
Trevor Williams	2	8	6.18	11	11	0	55.1	66	42	38	21	49
J. T. Brubaker	1	3	4.94	11	9	0	47.1	48	27	26	17	48
Chad Kuhl	2	3	4.27	11	9	0	46.1	35	26	22	28	44
Steven Brault	1	3	3.38	11	10	0	42.2	29	17	16	22	38
Derek Holland	1	3	6.86	12	5	0	40.2	42	33	31	15	45
Joe Musgrove	1	5	3.86	8	8	0	39.2	33	17	17	16	55
Chris Stratton	2	1	3.90	27	0	0	30.0	26	19	13	13	39
Richard Rodríguez	3	2	2.70	24	0	4	23.1	15	8	7	5	34
Geoff Hartlieb	1	0	3.63	21	0	0	22.1	16	11	9	19	19
Nik Turley	0	3	4.98	25	0	1	21.2	13	13	12	11	20
Mitch Keller	1	1	2.91	5	5	0	21.2	9	7	7	18	16
Sam Howard	2	3	3.86	22	0	0	21.0	17	10	9	9	27
Dovydas Neverauskas	0	3	7.11	17	0	0	19.0	24	17	15	10	23
Cody Ponce	1	1	3.18	5	3	0	17.0	12	7	6	6	12
Nick Tropeano	1	0	1.15	7	0	0	15.2	14	2	2	4	19
Tyler Bashlor	0	0	8.64	8	0	0	8.1	9	8	8	4	6
Kyle Crick	0	1	1.59	7	0	0	5.2	7	6	1	4	7
Nick Mears	0	0	5.40	4	0	0	5.0	4	3	3	7	7
Blake Cederlind	0	0	4.50	5	0	0	4.0	3	2	2	1	4
Yacksel Ríos	0	0	9.00	3	0	0	4.0	3	4	4	2	3
Austin Davis	0	0	2.45	5	0	0	3.2	1	1	1	1	3
Miguel Del Pozo	0	0	17.18	5	0	0	3.2	7	7	7	8	2
Robbie Erlin	0	0	5.40	2	0	0	3.1	5	2	2	1	4
Brandon Waddell	0	0	2.70	2	0	0	3.1	2	1	1	2	2
Nick Burdi	0	1	3.86	3	0	1	2.1	2	1	1	2	4
Keone Kela	0	0	4.50	3	0	0	2.0	3	1	1	1	3
Michael Feliz	0	0	32.40	3	0	0	1.2	4	6	6	2	2
Clay Holmes	0	0	0.00	1	0	0	1.1	2	0	0	0	1
John Ryan Murphy	0	0	0.00	1	0	0	1.0	0	0	0	0	0
Team totals	19	41	4.68	60	60	6	513.0	451	298	267	249	536

== Farm system ==
Level	Team	League	Manager
AAA	Indianapolis Indians	International League	
AA	Altoona Curve	Eastern League	
A	Bradenton Marauders	Florida State League	
A	Greensboro Grasshoppers	South Atlantic League	
Short-Season A	West Virginia Black Bears	New York–Penn League	
Rookie	Bristol Pirates	Appalachian League	
Rookie	GCL Pirates	Gulf Coast League	
Rookie	DSL Pirates 1	Dominican Summer League	
Rookie	DSL Pirates 2	Dominican Summer League	
