= 2020 Cincinnati Reds season =

2020 Cincinnati Reds
- National League Wild Card winners
- League: National League
- Division: Central
- Ballpark: Great American Ball Park
- City: Cincinnati, Ohio
- Record: 31–29 (.517)
- Divisional place: 3rd
- Owners: Bob Castellini
- President of baseball operations: Dick Williams
- General managers: Nick Krall
- Managers: David Bell
- Television: Fox Sports Ohio (Thom Brennaman (through August 19), Chris Welsh, George Grande, Jeff Brantley, Jim Day, Jeff Piecoro)
- Radio: WLW (700 AM); Reds Radio Network (Tommy Thrall, Jeff Brantley, Jim Day, Thom Brennaman, Chris Welsh, Doug Flynn (fill-in), Sam LeCure (fill-in), Danny Graves (fill-in))
- Stats: ESPN.com; Baseball Reference

The 2020 Cincinnati Reds season was the 151st season for the franchise in Major League Baseball (MLB), and their 18th at Great American Ball Park in Cincinnati. They made the playoffs as the number 7 seed in the National League, but were swept in two games by the Atlanta Braves in the NLWCS. The Braves held the Reds scoreless for all 22 innings in the series, an MLB postseason record.

On March 12, 2020, MLB announced that because of the ongoing COVID-19 pandemic, the start of the regular season would be delayed by at least two weeks in addition to the remainder of spring training being cancelled. Four days later, it was announced that the start of the season would be pushed back indefinitely due to the recommendation made by the CDC to restrict events of more than 50 people for eight weeks. On June 23, commissioner Rob Manfred unilaterally implemented a 60-game season. Players reported to training camps on July 1 in order to resume spring training and prepare for a July 24 Opening Day.

The shortened season led to the Reds recording the lowest number of hits (390) by a team in the modern era (since 1901). Their batting average of .212 was the lowest in MLB since the 1910 Chicago White Sox hit .211.

This was the Reds' first winning season and playoff appearance since 2013, and their last until 2025.

== Offseason ==
=== Coaching staff ===
- October 24, 2019: Named Alan Zinter hitting coach. Zinter was previously the Assistant Director of Player Development, Offense, for the San Francisco Giants the past two seasons.
- December 17, 2019: Named Joe Mather assistant hitting coach. Mather was previously the Minor League Field and Hitting Coordinator for the Arizona Diamondbacks.

=== Signings ===
- December 2, 2019: Signed free agent Mike Moustakas to a four-year, $64 million contract. Moustakas played second and third base for the Milwaukee Brewers in 2019 and is expected to play second base for the Reds.
- December 16, 2019: Signed free agent starting pitcher Wade Miley to a two-year, $15 million contract.
- January 6, 2020: Signed Japanese outfielder Shogo Akiyama to a three-year, $21 million contract. Akiyama will be the first Japanese-born player to play for the Reds, who were the last team to have never had one play for them.
- January 10, 2020: Agreed to one-year contracts with the following players, avoiding arbitration: starting pitcher Trevor Bauer, $17.5 million; reliever/outfielder Michael Lorenzen, $3.725 million; reliever Matt Bowman, $865,000; catcher Curt Casali, $1.4625 million; starting pitcher Anthony DeSclafani, $5.9 million.
- January 27, 2020: Signed free agent Nicholas Castellanos to a four-year, $64 million contract.
- January 30, 2020: Signed free agent reliever Pedro Strop to a one-year, $1.825 million contract.

== Standings ==
=== National League Central ===
NL Central
Team	W	L	Pct.	GB	Home	Road
Chicago Cubs	34	26	.567	—	19‍–‍14	15‍–‍12
St. Louis Cardinals	30	28	.517	3	14‍–‍13	16‍–‍15
Cincinnati Reds	31	29	.517	3	16‍–‍13	15‍–‍16
Milwaukee Brewers	29	31	.483	5	15‍–‍14	14‍–‍17
Pittsburgh Pirates	19	41	.317	15	13‍–‍19	6‍–‍22

If rescheduled games are the difference between the 5–8th seed in the playoffs, they are not played. The Cardinals did not play two games.

=== National League Wildcard ===
Division leaders
Team	W	L	Pct.
Los Angeles Dodgers	43	17	.717
Atlanta Braves	35	25	.583
Chicago Cubs	34	26	.567

Division 2nd place
Team	W	L	Pct.
San Diego Padres	37	23	.617
St. Louis Cardinals	30	28	.517
Miami Marlins	31	29	.517

Wild Card teams (Top 2 teams qualify for postseason)
Team	W	L	Pct.	GB
Cincinnati Reds	31	29	.517	+2
Milwaukee Brewers	29	31	.483	—
San Francisco Giants	29	31	.483	—
Philadelphia Phillies	28	32	.467	1
Washington Nationals	26	34	.433	3
New York Mets	26	34	.433	3
Colorado Rockies	26	34	.433	3
Arizona Diamondbacks	25	35	.417	4
Pittsburgh Pirates	19	41	.317	10

=== Record vs. opponents ===
2020 National League record Source: MLB Standings Grid – 2020
Team	CHC	CIN	MIL	PIT	STL	AL
Chicago	—	6–4	5–5	6–4	5–5	12–8
Cincinnati	4–6	—	6–4	7–3	4–6	10–10
Milwaukee	5–5	4–6	—	5–5	5–5	10–10
Pittsburgh	4–6	3–7	5–5	—	4–6	3–17
St. Louis	5–5	6–4	5–5	6–4	—	8–10

== Game log ==
=== Regular season ===
2020 Game Log: 31–29 (Home: 16–14; Away: 15–15)
July: 2–5 (Home: 2–4; Away: 0–1)

#	Date	Opponent	Score	Win	Loss	Save	Record	Box/Streak
1	July 24	Tigers	7–1	**Gray** (1–0)	Boyd (0–1)	—	1–0	W1
2	July 25	Tigers	4–6	Farmer (1–0)	**Iglesias** (0–1)	Jiménez (1)	1–1	L1
3	July 26	Tigers	2–3	Cisnero (1–0)	**Lorenzen** (0–1)	Jiménez (2)	1–2	L2
4	July 27	Cubs	7–8	Lester (1–0)	**Miley** (0–1)	Jeffress (1)	1–3	L3
5	July 28	Cubs	5–8	Mills (1–0)	**Reed** (0–1)	—	1–4	L4
6	July 29	Cubs	12–7	**Gray** (2–0)	Hendricks (1–1)	—	2–4	W1
—	July 30	Cubs	Postponed (inclement weather). Rescheduled to August 29.					
7	July 31	@ Tigers	2–7	Turnbull (1–0)	**Castillo** (0–1)	—	2–5	L1

August: 13–15 (Home: 5–6; Away: 8–9)

#	Date	Opponent	Score	Win	Loss	Save	Record	Box/Streak
—	August 1	@ Tigers	Postponed (inclement weather). Rescheduled to August 2.					
8	August 2	@ Tigers (1)	4–3 (7)	**Iglesias** (1–0)	Jiménez (0–1)	—	3–5	W1
9	August 2	@ Tigers (2)	4–0 (7)	**Bauer** (1–0)	Norris (0–1)	—	4–5	W2
10	August 3	Indians	3–2	**Gray** (3–0)	Plesac (0–1)	**Iglesias** (1)	5–5	W3
11	August 4	Indians	2–4	Bieber (3–0)	**Jones** (0–1)	Hand (3)	5–6	L1
12	August 5	@ Indians	0–2	Clevinger (1–1)	**Antone** (0–1)	Hand (4)	5–7	L2
13	August 6	@ Indians	0–13	Carrasco (2–1)	**Castillo** (0–2)	—	5–8	L3
14	August 7	@ Brewers	8–3	**Bauer** (2–0)	Lauer (0–1)	—	6–8	W1
15	August 8	@ Brewers	4–1	**DeSclafani** (1–0)	Anderson (0–1)	**Iglesias** (2)	7–8	W2
16	August 9	@ Brewers	3–9	Suter (2–0)	**Gray** (3–1)	—	7–9	L1
17	August 11	Royals	6–5 (10)	**Sims** (1–0)	Staumont (0–1)	—	8–9	W1
18	August 12	Royals	4–5	Keller (2–0)	**Miley** (0–2)	Rosenthal (4)	8–10	L1
19	August 13	Pirates	6–9	Williams (1–3)	**DeSclafani** (1–1)	—	8–11	L2
20	August 14	Pirates	8–1	**Gray** (4–1)	Kuhl (0–1)	—	9–11	W1
—	August 15	Pirates	Postponed (COVID-19). Rescheduled to September 4.					
—	August 16	Pirates	Postponed (COVID-19). Rescheduled to September 14.					
—	August 18	@ Royals	Postponed (COVID-19). Rescheduled to August 19.					
21	August 19	@ Royals (1)	0–4 (7)	Keller (3–0)	**Castillo** (0–3)	Rosenthal (6)	9–12	L1
22	August 19	@ Royals (2)	5–0 (7)	**Bauer** (3–0)	Harvey (0–1)	—	10–12	W1
23	August 20	@ Cardinals	4–5	Elledge (1–0)	**Iglesias** (1–2)	—	10–13	L1
24	August 21	@ Cardinals	4–2	**Lorenzen** (1–1)	Cabrera (1–1)	**Iglesias** (3)	11–13	W1
25	August 22	@ Cardinals	0–3	Kim (1–0)	**Miley** (0–3)	Gallegos (1)	11–14	L1
26	August 23	@ Cardinals	2–6	Cabrera (2–1)	**Mahle** (0–1)	–	11–15	L2
27	August 24	@ Brewers	2–4	Anderson (2–2)	**Bauer** (3–1)	Hader (6)	11–16	L3
28	August 25	@ Brewers	2–3	Woodruff (2–2)	**Castillo** (0–4)	Hader (7)	11–17	L4
—	August 26	@ Brewers	Postponed (Boycotts due to Jacob Blake shooting). Rescheduled to August 27.					
29	August 27	@ Brewers (1)	6–1 (7)	**Gray** (5–1)	Houser (1–3)	—	12–17	W1
30	August 27	@ Brewers (2)	6–0 (7)	**Sims** (2–0)	Lindblom (1–2)	—	13–17	W2
31	August 28	Cubs	6–5	**Mahle** (1–1)	Hendricks (3–4)	**Iglesias** (4)	14–17	W3
32	August 29	Cubs (1)	0–3 (7)	Darvish (6–1)	**Bauer** (3–2)	Jeffress (4)	14–18	L1
33	August 29	Cubs (2)	6–5 (7)	**Kuhnel** (1–0)	Kimbrel (0–1)		15–18	W1
34	August 30	Cubs	1–10	Rea (1–0)	**Castillo** (0–5)	—	15–19	L1
35	August 31	Cardinals	5–7	Hudson (1–2)	**DeSclafani** (1–2)	Gallegos (2)	15–20	L2

September: 16–9 (Home: 9–4; Away: 7–5)

#	Date	Opponent	Score	Win	Loss	Save	Record	Box/Streak
36	September 1	Cardinals	2–16	Kim (2–0)	**Gray** (5–2)	—	15–21	L3
37	September 2	Cardinals	4–3	**Iglesias** (2–2)	Gallegos (1–1)	—	16–21	W1
38	September 4	@ Pirates (1)	4–2 (7)	**Castillo** (1–5)	Brault (0–2)	**Iglesias** (5)	17–21	W2
39	September 4	Pirates (2)	3–4 (7)	Howard (2–1)	**Bauer** (3–3)	Rodríguez (3)	17–22	L1
40	September 5	@ Pirates	6–2	**Garrett** (1–0)	Williams (1–6)	—	18–22	W1
41	September 6	@ Pirates	2–3	Rodríguez (1–2)	**Iglesias** (2–3)	—	18–23	L1
42	September 8	@ Cubs	0–3	Mills (4–3)	**Mahle** (1–2)	Jeffress (6)	18–24	L2
43	September 9	@ Cubs	3–0	**Bauer** (4–3)	Darvish (7–2)	**Iglesias** (6)	19–24	W1
44	September 10	@ Cubs	5–8	Ryan (1-0)	**Gray** (5–3)	Jeffress (7)	19–25	L1
45	September 11	@ Cardinals	3–1	**Castillo** (2–5)	Wainwright (4–1)	—	20–25	W1
46	September 12	@ Cardinals	1–7	Hudson (3–2)	**Antone** (0–2)	—	20–26	L1
47	September 13	@ Cardinals	10–5	**Bradley** (2–0)	Gant (0–3)	**Iglesias** (7)	21–26	W1
48	September 14	Pirates (1)	3–1 (7)	**Iglesias** (3–3)	Howard (2–2)	—	22–26	W2
49	September 14	Pirates (2)	9–4 (7)	**Romano** (1–0)	Turley (0–2)	—	23–26	W3
50	September 15	Pirates	4–1	**Lorenzen** (2–1)	Musgrove (0–5)	**Garrett** (1)	24–26	W4
51	September 16	Pirates	1–0	**Castillo** (3–5)	Brubaker (1–2)	**Iglesias** (8)	25–26	W5
52	September 18	White Sox	7–1	**Mahle** (2–2)	Stiever (0–1)	—	26–26	W6
53	September 19	White Sox	0–5	Foster (5–0)	**Bauer** (4–4)	—	26–27	L1
54	September 20	White Sox	7–3	**Sims** (3–0)	Cease (5–3)	—	27–27	W1
55	September 21	Brewers	6–3	**Castillo** (4–5)	Woodruff (2–5)	—	28–27	W2
56	September 22	Brewers	2–3	Anderson (4–3)	**Antone** (0–3)	Hader (11)	28–28	L1
57	September 23	Brewers	6–1	**Bauer** (5–4)	Houser (1–6)	—	29–28	W1
58	September 25	@ Twins	7–2	**Lorenzen** (3–1)	Berríos (5–4)	—	30–28	W2
59	September 26	@ Twins	3–7	Clippard (2–1)	**Castillo** (4–6)	—	30–29	L1
60	September 27	@ Twins	5–3 (10)	**Iglesias** (4–3)	Romo (1–3)	—	31–29	W1

Legend: = Win = Loss = Postponement
Bold = Reds team member

=== Postseason ===
2020 Postseason Game Log: 0–2 (Home: 0–0; Away: 0–2)
NL Wild Card Series: 0–2 (Home: 0–0; Away: 0–2)

#	Date	Opponent	Score	Win	Loss	Save	Record	Box/Streak
1	September 30	@ Braves	0–1 (13)	Minter (1–0)	**Bradley** (0–1)	—	0–1	L1
2	October 1	@ Braves	0–5	Anderson (1–0)	**Castillo** (0–2)	—	0–2	L2

== Postseason rosters ==
Playoff rosters
National League Wild Card Series

- Pitchers: 21 Michael Lorenzen 22 Wade Miley 23 Archie Bradley 26 Raisel Iglesias 27 Trevor Bauer 30 Tyler Mahle 39 Lucas Sims 50 Amir Garrett 54 Sonny Gray 55 Robert Stephenson 58 Luis Castillo 70 Tejay Antone
- Catchers: 12 Curt Casali 16 Tucker Barnhart
- Infielders: 3 Freddy Galvis 7 Eugenio Suárez 9 Mike Moustakas 19 Joey Votto 38 José García 52 Kyle Farmer 64 Matt Davidson
- Outfielders: 2 Nicholas Castellanos 4 Shogo Akiyama 15 Nick Senzel 17 Brian Goodwin 31 Travis Jankowski 44 Aristides Aquino
- Designated hitters: 33 Jesse Winker

== Roster ==
2020 Cincinnati Reds
Roster
Pitchers: 70 Tejay Antone; 27 Trevor Bauer; 53 Jesse Biddle; 23 Archie Bradley; 58 Luis Castillo; 87 José De León; 28 Anthony DeSclafani; 50 Amir Garrett; 54 Sonny Gray; 26 Raisel Iglesias; 57 Nate Jones; 66 Joel Kuhnel; 21 Michael Lorenzen; 30 Tyler Mahle; 22 Wade Miley; 43 Brooks Raley; 23 Cody Reed; 47 Sal Romano; 39 Lucas Sims; 55 Robert Stephenson; 46 Pedro Strop; 48 Tyler Thornburg	Catchers: 16 Tucker Barnhart; 12 Curt Casali; 37 Tyler Stephenson; Infielders: 29 Christian Colón; 64 Matt Davidson; 52 Kyle Farmer; 3 Freddy Galvis; 38 José García; 9 Mike Moustakas; 7 Eugenio Suárez; 17 Josh VanMeter; 19 Joey Votto	Outfielders: 4 Shogo Akiyama; 44 Aristides Aquino; 2 Nicholas Castellanos; 6 Phil Ervin; 17 Brian Goodwin; 31 Travis Jankowski; 34 Mark Payton; 15 Nick Senzel; 33 Jesse Winker	Manager: 25 David Bell; Coaches: 45 Freddie Benavides (bench); 65 Caleb Cotham (assistant pitching); 90 Delino DeShields (first base/infield); 56 J. R. House (third base/catching); 92 Lee Irving (bullpen catcher); 36 Derek Johnson (pitching); 63 Joe Mather (assistant hitting); 89 Cristian Perez (assistant bullpen/advance scouting); 61 Jeff Pickler (game planning/outfield); 60 Lee Tunnell (bullpen); 88 Rolando Valles (associate); 59 Alan Zinter (hitting)

== Player stats ==
=== Batting ===
Note: G = Games played; AB = At bats; R = Runs; H = Hits; 2B = Doubles; 3B = Triples; HR = Home runs; RBI = Runs batted in; SB = Stolen bases; BB = Walks; AVG = Batting average; SLG = Slugging average

Player	G	AB	R	H	2B	3B	HR	RBI	SB	BB	AVG	SLG
Nick Castellanos	60	218	37	49	11	2	14	34	0	19	.225	.486
Eugenio Suárez	57	198	29	40	8	0	15	38	2	30	.202	.470
Joey Votto	54	186	32	42	8	0	11	22	0	37	.226	.446
Shogo Akiyama	54	155	16	38	6	1	0	9	7	25	.245	.297
Jesse Winker	54	149	27	38	7	0	12	23	1	28	.255	.544
Freddy Galvis	47	141	18	31	5	0	7	16	1	13	.220	.404
Mike Moustakas	44	139	13	32	9	0	8	27	1	18	.230	.468
Tucker Barnhart	38	98	10	20	3	0	5	13	0	12	.204	.388
Curt Casali	31	76	10	17	3	0	6	8	2	14	.224	.500
Nick Senzel	23	70	8	13	6	0	2	8	2	6	.186	.357
Jose Barrero	24	67	4	13	0	0	0	2	1	1	.194	.194
Kyle Farmer	32	64	4	17	3	0	0	4	1	5	.266	.313
Brian Goodwin	20	49	5	8	2	0	2	5	4	5	.163	.327
Aristides Aquino	23	47	7	8	1	0	2	8	1	6	.170	.319
Matt Davidson	20	43	3	7	1	0	3	11	0	4	.163	.395
Phil Ervin	19	35	5	3	0	0	0	0	1	6	.086	.086
Josh VanMeter	14	34	3	2	1	0	1	1	1	3	.059	.176
Christian Colón	11	23	3	3	1	0	0	2	1	1	.130	.174
Mark Payton	8	18	0	3	1	0	0	0	1	2	.167	.222
Tyler Stephenson	8	17	4	5	0	0	2	6	0	2	.294	.647
Travis Jankowski	16	15	3	1	0	0	0	0	2	2	.067	.067
Michael Lorenzen	6	0	2	0	0	0	0	0	0	0	.---	.---
Team totals	60	1842	243	390	76	3	90	237	29	239	.212	.403

=== Pitching ===
Note: W = Wins; L = Losses; ERA = Earned run average; G = Games pitched; GS = Games started; SV = Saves; IP = Innings pitched; H = Hits allowed; R = Runs allowed; ER = Earned runs allowed; BB = Walks allowed; SO = Strikeouts

Player	W	L	ERA	G	GS	SV	IP	H	R	ER	BB	SO
Trevor Bauer	5	4	1.73	11	11	0	73.0	41	17	14	17	100
Luis Castillo	4	6	3.21	12	12	0	70.0	62	31	25	24	89
Sonny Gray	5	3	3.70	11	11	0	56.0	42	26	23	26	72
Tyler Mahle	2	2	3.59	10	9	0	47.2	34	21	19	21	60
Tejay Antone	0	3	2.80	13	4	0	35.1	20	11	11	16	45
Anthony DeSclafani	1	2	7.22	9	7	0	33.2	41	27	27	16	25
Michael Lorenzen	3	1	4.28	18	2	0	33.2	30	17	16	17	35
Lucas Sims	3	0	2.45	20	0	0	25.2	13	10	7	11	34
Raisel Iglesias	4	3	2.74	22	0	8	23.0	16	11	7	5	31
Nate Jones	0	1	6.27	21	0	0	18.2	25	13	13	6	23
Amir Garrett	1	0	2.45	21	0	1	18.1	10	5	5	7	26
Wade Miley	0	3	5.65	6	4	0	14.1	15	10	9	9	12
Robert Stephenson	0	0	9.90	10	0	0	10.0	11	11	11	3	13
Cody Reed	0	1	5.79	9	0	0	9.1	10	6	6	8	10
Archie Bradley	1	0	1.17	6	0	0	7.2	4	1	1	0	6
Tyler Thornburg	0	0	3.86	7	0	0	7.0	6	3	3	5	10
José De León	0	0	18.00	5	0	0	6.0	6	12	12	11	10
Brooks Raley	0	0	9.00	4	0	0	4.0	5	4	4	2	6
Matt Davidson	0	0	5.40	3	0	0	3.1	4	2	2	2	1
Joel Kuhnel	1	0	6.00	3	0	0	3.0	4	2	2	0	3
Pedro Strop	0	0	3.86	4	0	0	2.1	1	3	1	6	3
Sal Romano	1	0	0.00	2	0	0	1.1	0	0	0	0	0
Jesse Biddle	0	0	0.00	1	0	0	0.2	1	0	0	1	1
Team totals	31	29	3.84	60	60	9	504.0	401	243	215	213	615

== Farm system ==
Level	Team	League	Manager
AAA	Louisville Bats	International League	
AA	Chattanooga Lookouts	Southern League	
A	Daytona Tortugas	Florida State League	
A	Dayton Dragons	Midwest League	
A-Rookie Advanced	Billings Mustangs	Pioneer League	
A-Rookie Advanced	Greeneville Reds	Appalachian League	
Rookie	AZL Reds	Arizona League	
Rookie	DSL Reds	Dominican Summer League	
