= 2020 Milwaukee Brewers season =

2020 Milwaukee Brewers
- National League Wild Card winners
- League: National League
- Division: Central
- Ballpark: Miller Park
- City: Milwaukee, Wisconsin
- Record: 29–31 (.483)
- Divisional place: 4th
- Owners: Mark Attanasio
- General managers: David Stearns
- Managers: Craig Counsell
- Television: Fox Sports Wisconsin (Brian Anderson, Bill Schroeder, Craig Coshun, Matt Lepay) Telemundo Wisconsin (Spanish-language coverage, Sunday home games; Hector Molina, Kevin Holden)
- Radio: 620 WTMJ; Milwaukee Brewers Radio Network (Bob Uecker, Jeff Levering, Lane Grindle)
- Stats: ESPN.com; Baseball Reference

The 2020 Milwaukee Brewers season was the 51st season for the Brewers in Milwaukee, the 23rd in the National League, and 52nd overall. The Brewers finished the regular season 29-31 and clinched the eighth seed in the postseason, becoming the first National League team to clinch the playoffs with a losing record. This marked the first time in franchise history where the Brewers clinched a playoff berth in three consecutive years, starting with the 2018 season.

On March 12, 2020, MLB announced that because of the ongoing COVID-19 pandemic, the start of the regular season would be delayed by at least two weeks in addition to the remainder of spring training being cancelled. Four days later, it was announced that the start of the season would be pushed back indefinitely due to the recommendation made by the CDC to restrict events of more than 50 people for eight weeks. On June 23, commissioner Rob Manfred unilaterally implemented a 60-game season. Players reported to training camps on July 1 in order to resume spring training and prepare for a July 24 Opening Day. The Brewers lost to the Los Angeles Dodgers in two games in the NLWCS.

== Spring training ==
The Brewers finished spring training with a record of 10–7 (2 ties). They also had 15 games canceled, 3 due to rain, and 12 due to the COVID-19 pandemic. Spring training was limited due to the COVID-19 pandemic. Upon returning to play in July 2020, the team played intra-squad scrimmages instead of playing a full complement of spring training games. The team flew by charter planes to their scrimmages. On July 22, they defeated the Chicago White Sox, in their only exhibition game during the restart, 5–3.

== Opening day starters ==
Order	Name	Pos.
1	Eric Sogard	3B
2	Christian Yelich	LF
3	Keston Hiura	2B
4	Justin Smoak	1B
5	Ryan Braun	DH
6	Avisaíl García	RF
7	Omar Narvaez	C
8	Lorenzo Cain	CF
9	Orlando Arcia	SS
—	Brandon Woodruff	P

== Season standings ==
=== National League Central ===
NL Central
Team	W	L	Pct.	GB	Home	Road
Chicago Cubs	34	26	.567	—	19‍–‍14	15‍–‍12
St. Louis Cardinals	30	28	.517	3	14‍–‍13	16‍–‍15
Cincinnati Reds	31	29	.517	3	16‍–‍13	15‍–‍16
Milwaukee Brewers	29	31	.483	5	15‍–‍14	14‍–‍17
Pittsburgh Pirates	19	41	.317	15	13‍–‍19	6‍–‍22

=== National League Wild Card ===
Division leaders
Team	W	L	Pct.
Los Angeles Dodgers	43	17	.717
Atlanta Braves	35	25	.583
Chicago Cubs	34	26	.567

Division 2nd place
Team	W	L	Pct.
San Diego Padres	37	23	.617
St. Louis Cardinals	30	28	.517
Miami Marlins	31	29	.517

Wild Card teams (Top 2 teams qualify for postseason)
Team	W	L	Pct.	GB
Cincinnati Reds	31	29	.517	+2
Milwaukee Brewers	29	31	.483	—
San Francisco Giants	29	31	.483	—
Philadelphia Phillies	28	32	.467	1
Washington Nationals	26	34	.433	3
New York Mets	26	34	.433	3
Colorado Rockies	26	34	.433	3
Arizona Diamondbacks	25	35	.417	4
Pittsburgh Pirates	19	41	.317	10

The Brewers had the tiebreaker edge with their record against division opponents (19–21) better than the Giants' (18–22).

=== Record vs. opponents ===
2020 National League record Source: MLB Standings Grid – 2020
Team}}WSH!style="background-color: #0E3386 !important; color: #FFFFFF !important; box-shadow: inset 2px 2px 0 #CC3433, inset -2px -2px 0 #CC3433; !important; width:35px;"SF	AL					
Chicago	—	6–4	5–5	6–4	5–5	12–8
Cincinnati	4–6	—	6–4	7–3	4–6	10–10
Milwaukee	5–5	4–6	—	5–5	5–5	10–10
Pittsburgh	4–6	3–7	5–5	—	4–6	3–17
St. Louis	5–5	6–4	5–5	6–4	—	8–10

== Game log ==
=== Regular season ===
2020 regular season game log: 29–31 (Home: 15–14; Away: 14–17)
July: 3–3 (Home: 0–0; Away: 3–3)

#	Date	Opponent	Score	Loss	Win	Save	Record	Box/ Streak
1	July 24	@ Cubs	0–3	**Woodruff** (0–1)	Hendricks (1–0)	—	0–1	L1
2	July 25	@ Cubs	8–3	Darvish (0–1)	**Suter** (1–0)	—	1–1	W1
3	July 26	@ Cubs	1–9	**Peralta** (0–1)	Chatwood (1–0)	—	1–2	L1
4	July 27	@ Pirates	6–5 (11)	Neverauskas (0–1)	**Phelps** (1–0)	—	2–2	W1
5	July 28	@ Pirates	6–8	**Wahl** (0–1)	Hartlieb (1–0)	Burdi (1)	2–3	L1
6	July 29	@ Pirates	3–0	Musgrove (0–2)	**Woodruff** (1–1)	**Hader** (1)	3–3	W1
—	July 31	Cardinals	Postponed (COVID-19); Makeup: September 14					

August: 13–15 (Home: 7–9; Away: 6–6)

#	Date	Opponent	Score	Loss	Win	Save	Record	Box/ Streak
—	August 1	Cardinals	Postponed (COVID-19); Makeup: September 16					
—	August 2	Cardinals	Postponed (COVID-19); Makeup: September 25					
7	August 3	White Sox	4–6	**Phelps** (1–1)	Detwiler (1–0)	Colomé (2)	3–4	L1
8	August 4	White Sox	2–3	**Williams** (0–1)	Giolito (1–1)	Colomé (3)	3–5	L2
9	August 5	@ White Sox	1–0	Keuchel (2–1)	**Houser** (1–0)	**Hader** (2)	4–5	W1
10	August 6	@ White Sox	8–3	González (0–1)	**Lindblom** (1–0)	—	5–5	W2
11	August 7	Reds	3–8	**Lauer** (0–1)	Bauer (2–0)	—	5–6	L1
12	August 8	Reds	1–4	**Anderson** (0–1)	DeSclafani (1–0)	Iglesias (2)	5–7	L2
13	August 9	Reds	9–3	Gray (3–1)	**Suter** (2–0)	—	6–7	W1
14	August 10	Twins	2–4	**Houser** (1–1)	Dobnak (3–1)	Rogers (4)	6–8	L1
15	August 11	Twins	6–4	Rogers (1–2)	**Williams** (1–1)	**Hader** (3)	7–8	W1
16	August 12	Twins	2–12	**Lauer** (0–2)	Maeda (3–0)	—	7–9	L1
17	August 13	@ Cubs	2–4	**Anderson** (0–2)	Darvish (3–1)	Wick (3)	7–10	L2
18	August 14	@ Cubs	4–3	Mills (2–1)	**Peralta** (1–1)	**Hader** (4)	8–10	W1
19	August 15	@ Cubs	6–5 (10)	Jeffress (1–1)	**Phelps** (2–1)	**Claudio** (1)	9–10	W2
20	August 16	@ Cubs	6–5	Adam (0–1)	**Yardley** (1–0)	**Hader** (5)	10–10	W3
21	August 18	@ Twins	3–4 (12)	**Phelps** (2–2)	Alcalá (1–0)	—	10–11	L1
22	August 19	@ Twins	9–3	Hill (1–1)	**Anderson** (1–2)	—	11–11	W1
23	August 20	@ Twins	1–7	**Woodruff** (1–2)	Berríos (2–3)	—	11–12	L1
24	August 21	@ Pirates	2–7	**Houser** (1–2)	Kuhl (1–1)	—	11–13	L2
25	August 22	@ Pirates	5–12	**Lindblom** (1–1)	Holland (1–1)	—	11–14	L3
26	August 23	@ Pirates	4–5	**Phelps** (2–3)	Stratton (1–0)	Rodríguez (1)	11–15	L4
27	August 24	Reds	4–2	Bauer (3–1)	**Anderson** (2–2)	**Hader** (6)	12–15	W1
28	August 25	Reds	3–2	Castillo (0–4)	**Woodruff** (2–2)	**Hader** (7)	13–15	W2
—	August 26	Reds	Postponed (Boycotts due to Jacob Blake shooting); Makeup: August 27					
29	August 27 (1)	Reds	1–6	**Houser** (1–3)	Gray (5–1)	–	13–16	L1
30	August 27 (2)	Reds	0–6	**Lindblom** (1–2)	Sims (2–0)	–	13–17	L2
31	August 28	Pirates	9–1	Holland (1–2)	**Burnes** (1–0)	—	14–17	W1
32	August 29	Pirates	7–6	Rodríguez (0–2)	**Williams** (2–1)	–	15–17	W2
33	August 30	Pirates	1–5	**Woodruff** (2–3)	Tropeano (1–0)	—	15–18	L1
34	August 31	Pirates	6–5	Turley (0–1)	**Williams** (3–1)	**Hader** (8)	16–18	W1

September: 13–13 (Home: 8–5; Away: 5–8)

#	Date	Opponent	Score	Loss	Win	Save	Record	Box/ Streak
35	September 1	Tigers	1–12	**Lindblom** (1–3)	Norris (3–1)	—	16–19	L1
36	September 2	Tigers	8–5	Jiménez (1–2)	**Yardley** (2–0)	**Hader** (9)	17–19	W1
37	September 4	@ Indians	7–1	Maton (2–1)	**Burnes** (2–0)	—	18–19	W2
38	September 5	@ Indians	3–4	**Hader** (0–1)	Hand (1–1)	—	18–20	L1
39	September 6	@ Indians	1–4	**Anderson** (2–3)	Bieber (7–0)	Hand (11)	18–21	L2
40	September 8	@ Tigers	3–8	**Houser** (1–4)	Turnbull (4–2)	—	18–22	L3
41	September 9	@ Tigers	19–0	Boyd (1–6)	**Burnes** (3–0)	—	19–22	W1
42	September 11	Cubs	1–0	Wick (0–1)	**Hader** (1–1)	—	20–22	W2
43	September 12	Cubs	2–4	**Hader** (1–2)	Adam (1–1)	Kimbrel (2)	20–23	L1
44	September 13	Cubs	0–12	**Houser** (1–5)	Mills (5–3)	—	20–24	L2
45	September 14 (1)	Cardinals	2–1 (8)	Helsley (1–1)	**Peralta** (2–1)	—	21–24	W1
46	September 14 (2)	Cardinals	2–3 (9)	**Topa** (0–1)	Cabrera (4–1)	Webb (1)	21–25	L1
47	September 15	Cardinals	18–3	Flaherty (3–2)	**Anderson** (3–3)	—	22–25	W1
48	September 16 (1)	Cardinals	2–4 (7)	**Woodruff** (2–4)	Wainwright (5–1)	—	22–26	L1
49	September 16 (2)	Cardinals	6–0 (7)	Oviedo (0–3)	**Peralta** (3–1)	—	23–26	W1
50	September 18	Royals	9–5	Duffy (3–4)	**Rasmussen** (1–0)	—	24–26	W2
51	September 19	Royals	5–0	Bubic (1–6)	**Burnes** (4–0)	—	25–26	W3
52	September 20	Royals	5–3	Keller (4–3)	**Lindblom** (2–3)	**Hader** (10)	26–26	W4
53	September 21	@ Reds	3–6	**Woodruff** (2–5)	Castillo (4–5)	—	26–27	L1
54	September 22	@ Reds	3–2	Antone (0–3)	**Anderson** (4–3)	**Hader** (11)	27–27	W1
55	September 23	@ Reds	1–6	**Houser** (1–6)	Bauer (5–4)	—	27–28	L1
56	September 24	@ Cardinals	2–4	**Burnes** (4–1)	Kim (3–0)	Miller (4)	27–29	L2
57	September 25 (1)	@ Cardinals	3–0 (7)	Flaherty (4–3)	**Williams** (4–1)	**Hader** (12)	28–29	W1
58	September 25 (2)	@ Cardinals	1–9 (7)	**Lindblom** (2–4)	Ponce de Leon (1–3)	—	28–30	L1
59	September 26	@ Cardinals	3–0	Wainwright (5–3)	**Woodruff** (3–5)	**Hader** (13)	29–30	W1
60	September 27	@ Cardinals	2–5	**Anderson** (4–4)	Gallegos (2–2)	Reyes (1)	29–31	L1

Legend: = Win = Loss = Postponement
Bold = Brewers team member

=== Postseason Game log ===
2020 Postseason game log: 0–2 (Home: 0–0; Away: 0–2)
NL Wild Card Series: 0–2 (Home: 0–0; Away: 0–2)

#	Date	Opponent	Score	Loss	Win	Save	Record	Box/ Streak
1	September 30	@ Dodgers	2–4	**Suter** (0–1)	Urías (1–0)	Jansen (1)	0–1	L1
2	October 1	@ Dodgers	0–3	**Woodruff** (0–1)	Kershaw (1–0)	Graterol (1)	0–2	L2

== Postseason rosters ==
Playoff rosters
National League Wild Card Series

- Pitchers: 29 Josh Lindblom 35 Brent Suter 37 Adrian Houser 43 Drew Rasmussen 46 Corey Knebel 50 Ray Black 51 Freddy Peralta 53 Brandon Woodruff 56 Justin Topa 57 Eric Yardley 58 Alex Claudio 71 Josh Hader
- Catchers: 9 Manny Piña 10 Omar Narváez 20 David Freitas
- Infielders: 2 Luis Urías 3 Orlando Arcia 5 Jedd Gyorko 7 Eric Sogard 18 Keston Hiura 20 Daniel Vogelbach 28 Ryon Healy
- Outfielders: 8 Ryan Braun 14 Jace Peterson 15 Tyrone Taylor 16 Ben Gamel 22 Christian Yelich 24 Avisaíl García

== Roster ==
2020 Milwaukee Brewers
Roster
Pitchers: 25 Brett Anderson; 32 Phil Bickford; 50 Ray Black; 39 Corbin Burnes; 58 Alex Claudio; 54 J. P. Feyereisen; 52 Justin Grimm; 71 Josh Hader; 37 Adrian Houser; 46 Corey Knebel; 27 Eric Lauer; 29 Josh Lindblom; 51 Freddy Peralta; 47 Ángel Perdomo; 41 David Phelps; 43 Drew Rasmussen; 35 Brent Suter; 56 Justin Topa; 31 Bobby Wahl; 38 Devin Williams; 53 Brandon Woodruff; 57 Eric Yardley	Catchers: 10 Omar Narváez; 26 Jacob Nottingham; 9 Manny Piña; Infielders: 3 Orlando Arcia; 5 Jedd Gyorko; 28 Ryon Healy; 18 Keston Hiura; 11 Brock Holt; 21 Logan Morrison; 12 Justin Smoak; 7 Eric Sogard; 2 Luis Urías; 21 Daniel Vogelbach	Outfielders: 8 Ryan Braun; 6 Lorenzo Cain; 16 Ben Gamel; 24 Avisaíl García; 13,61 Mark Mathias; 14 Jace Peterson; 15 Tyrone Taylor; 22 Christian Yelich	Manager: 30 Craig Counsell; Coaches: 62 Jacob Cruz (assistant hitting); 63 Robinzon Díaz (bullpen catcher); 49 Andy Haines (hitting); 55 Marcus Hanel (bullpen catcher); 48 Chris Hook (pitching); 33 Steve Karsay (bullpen); 40 Jason Lane (first base); 59 Pat Murphy (bench/catching); 0 Ed Sedar (third base/outfield)

== Statistics ==
=== Regular season ===
==== Batting ====
Note: G = Games played; AB = At bats; R = Runs; H = Hits; 2B = Doubles; 3B = Triples; HR = Home runs; RBI = Runs batted in; SB = Stolen bases; BB = Walks; K = Strikeouts; AVG = Batting average; OBP = On base percentage; SLG = Slugging percentage; TB = Total bases

Player	G	AB	R	H	2B	3B	HR	RBI	SB	BB	K	AVG	OBP	SLG	TB
Omar Narváez	40	108	8	19	4	0	2	10	0	16	39	.176	.294	.562	29
Justin Smoak	33	113	14	21	7	0	5	15	1	10	40	.186	.262	.381	43
Keston Hiura	59	217	30	46	4	0	13	32	3	16	85	.212	.297	.410	89
Orlando Arcia	59	173	22	45	10	1	5	20	2	14	32	.260	.317	.416	72
Eric Sogard	43	115	10	24	5	0	1	10	0	11	20	.209	.281	.278	32
Christian Yelich	58	200	39	41	7	1	12	22	4	46	76	.205	.356	.430	86
Avisaíl García	53	181	20	43	10	0	2	15	1	20	49	.238	.333	.326	59
Ben Gamel	40	114	13	27	8	1	3	10	0	13	39	.237	.315	.404	46
Ryan Braun	39	129	14	30	7	1	8	26	1	7	27	.233	.281	.488	63
Jedd Gyorko	42	117	19	29	3	0	9	17	0	15	38	.248	.333	.504	59
Luis Urías	41	109	11	26	4	1	0	11	2	10	32	.239	.308	.294	32
Daniel Vogelbach	19	58	13	19	2	0	4	12	0	8	18	.328	.418	.569	33
Jace Peterson	26	45	6	9	1	0	2	5	1	15	20	.200	.393	.356	16
Jacob Nottingham	20	48	8	9	1	0	4	13	0	5	20	.188	.278	.458	22
Manny Piña	15	39	4	9	1	0	2	5	0	3	11	.231	.333	.410	16
Tyrone Taylor	22	38	6	9	4	0	2	6	0	2	8	.237	.293	.500	19
Mark Mathias	16	36	2	10	3	0	0	4	1	0	7	.278	.278	.361	13
Brock Holt	16	30	1	3	0	0	0	1	0	4	9	.100	.222	.100	3
Logan Morrison	9	25	3	3	1	0	1	2	0	3	8	.120	.214	.280	7
Lorenzo Cain	5	18	4	6	1	0	0	2	0	3	2	.333	.429	.389	7
Ryon Healy	4	7	0	1	0	0	0	0	0	0	2	.143	.143	.143	1
Team totals	60	1920	247	429	83	5	75	238	15	221	582	.223	.313	.389	747

==== Pitching ====
Note: W = Wins; L = Losses; ERA = Earned run average; G = Games pitched; GS = Games started; SV = Saves; IP = Innings pitched; H = Hits allowed; R = Runs allowed; ER = Earned runs allowed; BB = Walks allowed; K = Strikeouts

Player	W	L	ERA	G	GS	SV	IP	H	R	ER	BB	K
Brandon Woodruff	3	5	3.05	13	13	0	73.2	55	26	25	18	91
Corbin Burnes	4	1	2.11	12	9	0	59.2	37	15	14	24	88
Adrian Houser	1	6	5.30	12	11	0	56.0	63	41	33	21	44
Brett Anderson	4	4	4.21	10	10	0	47.0	50	24	22	10	32
Josh Lindblom	2	4	5.16	12	10	0	45.1	42	26	26	16	52
Josh Hader	1	2	3.79	21	0	13	19.0	8	8	8	10	31
Brent Suter	2	0	3.13	16	4	0	31.2	30	13	11	5	38
Devin Williams	4	1	0.33	22	0	0	27.0	8	4	1	9	53
Eric Yardley	2	0	1.54	24	0	0	23.1	19	6	4	10	19
Alex Claudio	0	0	4.26	20	0	1	19.0	18	10	9	6	15
Freddy Peralta	3	1	3.99	15	0	0	29.1	22	14	13	12	47
Drew Rasmussen	1	0	5.87	12	0	0	15.1	17	10	10	9	21
Corey Knebel	0	0	6.08	15	0	0	13.1	15	9	9	8	15
David Phelps	2	3	2.77	12	0	0	13.0	7	5	4	2	20
Eric Lauer	0	2	13.09	4	2	0	11.0	17	16	16	9	12
J. P. Feyereisen	0	0	5.79	6	0	0	9.1	4	6	6	5	7
Justin Topa	0	1	2.35	6	0	0	7.2	7	3	2	0	12
Justin Grimm	0	0	17.36	4	0	0	4.2	9	9	9	4	6
Ray Black	0	0	3.00	3	0	0	3.0	2	1	1	3	3
Ángel Perdomo	0	0	20.25	3	0	0	2.2	3	7	6	7	5
Bobby Wahl	0	1	11.57	3	0	0	2.1	4	3	3	0	1
Orlando Arcia	0	0	18.00	2	0	0	2.0	4	4	4	1	0
Phil Bickford	0	0	36.00	1	0	0	1.0	4	4	4	0	2
Jedd Gyorko	0	0	0.00	1	0	0	1.0	1	0	0	0	0
Team totals	29	31	4.16	60	60	14	517.1	446	264	239	189	614

== Farm system ==
The Brewers' farm system consisted of nine minor league affiliates in 2020. The minor league season, however, was cancelled due to the COVID-19 pandemic. Milwaukee planned to operate a Dominican Summer League team as a co-op with the Toronto Blue Jays.

Level	Team	League	Manager
Triple-A	San Antonio Missions	Pacific Coast League	Rick Sweet
Double-A	Biloxi Shuckers	Southern League	Mike Guerrero
Class A-Advanced	Carolina Mudcats	Carolina League	Joe Ayrault
Class A	Wisconsin Timber Rattlers	Midwest League	Matt Erickson
Rookie	Rocky Mountain Vibes	Pioneer League	Liu Rodríguez
Rookie	AZL Brewers Blue	Arizona League	Rafael Neda
Rookie	AZL Brewers Gold	Arizona League	Nick Stanley
Rookie	DSL Brewers	Dominican Summer League	Victor Estevez
Rookie	DSL Brewers/Blue Jays	Dominican Summer League	Fidel Peña

== Milwaukee Brewers monetary losses ==
A report in the Milwaukee Business Journal has estimated that the Milwaukee Brewers lost $178.3 million revenue as a result of having no fans. For 2020, Team Marketing Report has calculated $5 billion in losses for Major League Baseball.
