= 2020 National League Wild Card Series =

Professional baseball postseason series

- September 30–October 2, 2020
- Los Angeles Dodgers 2–0 Milwaukee Brewers
- Atlanta Braves 2–0 Cincinnati Reds
- Chicago Cubs 0–2 Miami Marlins
- San Diego Padres 2–1 St. Louis Cardinals
- ← 2019 NLWC 2021 →

The 2020 National League Wild Card Series were four best-of-three-games series in Major League Baseball’s (MLB) 2020 postseason to determine participating teams in the 2020 National League Division Series. Because of the COVID-19 pandemic, MLB expanded the postseason from 10 to 16 teams (8 for each league) with all teams starting in the wild card round instead of holding the regular Wild Card Game for each league. All games for each series were played at the higher seeded team's home ballpark and were a best of 3 series.

The matchups were:

- (1) Los Angeles Dodgers (NL West champions) vs. (8) Milwaukee Brewers (second wild card): Dodgers won the series, 2–0.
- (2) Atlanta Braves (NL East champions) vs. (7) Cincinnati Reds (first wild card): Braves won the series, 2–0.
- (3) Chicago Cubs (NL Central champions) vs. (6) Miami Marlins (NL East 2nd place): Marlins won the series, 2–0.
- (4) San Diego Padres (NL West 2nd place) vs. (5) St. Louis Cardinals (NL Central 2nd place): Padres won the series, 2–1.

Because of the expanded postseason format, the National League Central became the first division in MLB history with four teams in the postseason in the same year. However, none of the four teams played each other, and all four lost their Wild Card Series, with each team losing its elimination game via a shutout.

== Background ==
On September 15, 2020, MLB announced the playoff bracket for the 2020 season, which was shortened to 60 regular season games due to the COVID-19 pandemic. The postseason will consist of eight teams from each league: The top two teams from each division, plus the teams from each league with the next two best records. The Wild Card Series will be a best-of-three series, as opposed to the play-in game format of the Wild Card Game from previous seasons, while the Division Series, League Championship Series, and World Series will be their normal lengths. The Wild Card Series games will be played at the home field of the higher seeded team.

== Matchups ==
=== Los Angeles Dodgers vs. Milwaukee Brewers ===
Los Angeles won the series, 2–0.

Game	Date	Score	Location	Time	Attendance
1	September 30	Milwaukee Brewers – 2, Los Angeles Dodgers – 4	Dodger Stadium	3:17	N/A
2	October 1	Milwaukee Brewers – 0, Los Angeles Dodgers – 3	Dodger Stadium	2:55	N/A

=== Atlanta Braves vs. Cincinnati Reds ===
Atlanta won the series, 2–0.

Game	Date	Score	Location	Time	Attendance
1	September 30	Cincinnati Reds – 0, Atlanta Braves – 1 (13)	Truist Park	4:39	N/A
2	October 1	Cincinnati Reds – 0, Atlanta Braves – 5	Truist Park	3:03	N/A

=== Chicago Cubs vs. Miami Marlins ===
Miami won the series, 2–0.

Game	Date	Score	Location	Time	Attendance
1	September 30	Miami Marlins – 5, Chicago Cubs – 1	Wrigley Field	3:22	N/A
2	October 2	Miami Marlins – 2, Chicago Cubs – 0	Wrigley Field	3:22	N/A

=== San Diego Padres vs. St. Louis Cardinals ===
San Diego won the series, 2–1.

Game	Date	Score	Location	Time	Attendance
1	September 30	St. Louis Cardinals – 7, San Diego Padres – 4	Petco Park	3:53	N/A
2	October 1	St. Louis Cardinals – 9, San Diego Padres – 11	Petco Park	4:19	N/A
3	October 2	St. Louis Cardinals – 0, San Diego Padres – 4	Petco Park	3:21	N/A

== Los Angeles vs. Milwaukee ==
This is the second postseason meeting between the Dodgers and Brewers. The previous meeting took place in the 2018 National League Championship Series, in which the Dodgers won in seven games.

=== Game 1 ===
September 30, 2020 7:08 pm (PDT) at Dodger Stadium in Los Angeles, California
Team	1	2	3	4	5	6	7	8	9	R	H	E
Milwaukee	0	0	0	2	0	0	0	0	0	2	7	0
Los Angeles	2	1	0	0	0	0	1	0	X	4	6	1
WP: Julio Urías (1–0) LP: Brent Suter (0–1) Sv: Kenley Jansen (1); Home runs: MIL: Orlando Arcia (1); LAD: Corey Seager (1); Attendance: N/A; Boxscore

Walker Buehler was matched for the Dodgers against Brent Suter of the Brewers. The Dodgers offense started quickly, with Mookie Betts hitting a leadoff double, followed by a walk to Corey Seager. After Justin Turner popped out, consecutive walks to Max Muncy and Will Smith forced in a run. After another out, A.J. Pollock walked to score the second run. In the second inning, Betts followed a Chris Taylor double with one of his own to make it 3-0. Orlando Arcia narrowed the lead to 3-2 with a home run in the fourth inning, but Seager closed the scoring with a home run in the seventh inning. Buehler was taken out after the fourth inning for Julio Urias, who hurled three shutout innings as the first of three relievers and received the win while the Brewers toiled with five total pitchers.

=== Game 2 ===
October 1, 2020 7:08 pm (PDT) at Dodger Stadium in Los Angeles, California
Team	1	2	3	4	5	6	7	8	9	R	H	E
Milwaukee	0	0	0	0	0	0	0	0	0	0	4	0
Los Angeles	0	0	0	0	3	0	0	0	X	3	6	0
WP: Clayton Kershaw (1–0) LP: Brandon Woodruff (0–1) Sv: Brusdar Graterol (1); Attendance: N/A; Boxscore

The Dodgers' Clayton Kershaw faced the Brewers' Brandon Woodruff. Kershaw struck out 13 batters in eight scoreless innings, allowing three fifth-inning Los Angeles runs to stand as the winning margin. With A. J. Pollock and Chris Taylor on base and two outs, Austin Barnes singled to center to drive in a run. Mookie Betts followed with a double to left to score two more and chase Woodruff from the game. The Brewers held the Dodgers scoreless the rest of the way, but Brusdar Graterol collected his first career save as a Dodger to close out the series. Kershaw's strikeout total was the most for a Dodger in the postseason since Sandy Koufax struck out 15 batters in the 1963 World Series.

=== Composite line score ===
2020 NLWC (2–0): Los Angeles Dodgers beat Milwaukee Brewers

Team	1	2	3	4	5	6	7	8	9	R	H	E
Milwaukee Brewers	0	0	0	2	0	0	0	0	0	2	11	0
Los Angeles Dodgers	2	1	0	0	3	0	1	0	X	7	12	1
Total attendance: N/A Average attendance: N/A

== Atlanta vs. Cincinnati ==
This is the second postseason meeting between the Braves and Reds. The previous meeting took place in the 1995 National League Championship Series, in which the Braves won in a four-game sweep.

=== Game 1 ===
September 30, 2020 12:08 pm (EDT) at Truist Park in Atlanta, Georgia
Team	1	2	3	4	5	6	7	8	9	10	11	12	13	R	H	E
Cincinnati	0	0	0	0	0	0	0	0	0	0	0	0	0	0	11	1
Atlanta	0	0	0	0	0	0	0	0	0	0	0	0	1	1	6	0
WP: A.J. Minter (1–0) LP: Archie Bradley (0–1); Attendance: N/A; Boxscore

Game 1 matched Trevor Bauer and Max Fried. Bauer struck out 12 while allowing two Braves hits in 7 2/3 innings, but Fried matched him with seven innings of six-hit ball as both teams relied on the bullpens to try to carry the way, with the Braves using seven reliever and the Reds using five. Both teams would hit once with runners on scoring position, but the Reds left 13 on the bases while the Braves left nine, with the Reds leaving the bases loaded twice. In the 11th, the Reds got on with a double and two walks after two strikeouts, but Tyler Matzek struck out Mike Moustakas to end the threat. In the 13th, the Reds garnered two singles and a walk, but A.J. Minter quelled threats to score. In the bottom half, the Braves reached on singles by Nick Markakis and Austin Riley off Archie Bradley to set up for Freddie Freeman versus Amir Garrett. Freeman lined a one-out single to score the winning run. It was the first time the Braves had won Game 1 of a postseason series since the 2001 NLDS, snapping an 0-for-10 streak.

This was the first time in MLB postseason history that a game was scoreless after 11 innings. There were also 37 strikeouts, a postseason record. This was also the first (and as it would end up, only) extra innings game of the 2020 season to not have the runner on second rule, which only applied to the regular season.

=== Game 2 ===
October 1, 2020 12:08 pm (EDT) at Truist Park in Atlanta, Georgia
Team	1	2	3	4	5	6	7	8	9	R	H	E
Cincinnati	0	0	0	0	0	0	0	0	0	0	2	1
Atlanta	0	0	0	0	1	0	0	4	X	5	9	0
WP: Ian Anderson (1–0) LP: Luis Castillo (0–1); Home runs: CIN: None; ATL: Marcell Ozuna (1), Adam Duvall (1); Attendance: N/A; Boxscore

Ian Anderson faced Luis Castillo for Game 2. Anderson would allow two hits with no runs while striking out nine for six innings while Castillo went 5 1/3 innings and struck out seven with one run allowed on six hits. The go-ahead run scored on a Ronald Acuña Jr. two-out double in the fifth inning. Home runs by Marcell Ozuna and Adam Duvall in the eight inning off Raisel Iglesias proved the final blow needed for the Braves to win their first postseason clincher in 19 years.

For the sixth time in MLB history, the Reds became the fifth team to end a postseason without scoring a run, after the Indians (2013), Pirates (2014 and 2015), Yankees (2015), and Mets (2016), and the first team in MLB history to fail to score a run in a postseason series with more than one game. This would also be only the second time a postseason series consisted entirely of shutouts after the 1905 World Series 115 years before.

=== Composite line score ===
2020 NLWC (2–0): Atlanta Braves beat Cincinnati Reds

Team	1	2	3	4	5	6	7	8	9	10	11	12	13	R	H	E
Cincinnati Reds	0	0	0	0	0	0	0	0	0	0	0	0	0	0	13	2
Atlanta Braves	0	0	0	0	1	0	0	4	0	0	0	0	1	6	15	0
Total attendance: N/A Average attendance: N/A

== Chicago vs. Miami ==
This is the second postseason meeting between the Cubs and Marlins. The previous meeting took place in the 2003 National League Championship Series, in which the then-Florida Marlins won in seven games after trailing the series 3–1. Game 2, originally scheduled for October 1, was postponed due to rain. The game was moved to October 2 and Game 3 (if necessary) to October 3.

=== Game 1 ===
September 30, 2020 1:08 pm (CDT) at Wrigley Field in Chicago, Illinois
Team	1	2	3	4	5	6	7	8	9	R	H	E
Miami	0	0	0	0	0	0	5	0	0	5	8	4
Chicago	0	0	0	0	1	0	0	0	0	1	4	1
WP: Sandy Alcántara (1–0) LP: Kyle Hendricks (0–1); Home runs: MIA: Corey Dickerson (1), Jesús Aguilar (1); CHC: Ian Happ (1); Attendance: N/A; Boxscore

The Marlins were making their first postseason appearance since the 2003 World Series, and they sent out Sandy Alcántara to pitch against Kyle Hendricks. Ian Happ gave the Cubs the lead with a solo shot in the fifth inning, but it was one of only four hits allowed by the Marlins, Hendricks was going strong until the seventh inning, as he had held Miami to 0-for-9 with batters in scoring position. However, with one out, he allowed consecutive singles to set up Corey Dickerson at the plate. Hendricks, over 100 pitches at the moment, was allowed to pitch to Dickerson. He proceeded to hit a shot to left-center field that cleared the wall and turn the lead in favor of Miami. Hendricks was pulled afterwards, but two batters later, Miami ended the scoring with a two-run shot by Jesús Aguilar.

=== Game 2 ===
October 2, 2020 1:08 pm (CDT) at Wrigley Field in Chicago, Illinois
Team	1	2	3	4	5	6	7	8	9	R	H	E
Miami	0	0	0	0	0	0	2	0	0	2	5	0
Chicago	0	0	0	0	0	0	0	0	0	0	5	0
WP: Brad Boxberger (1–0) LP: Yu Darvish (0–1) Sv: Brandon Kintzler (1); Home runs: MIA: Garrett Cooper (1); CHC: None; Attendance: N/A; Boxscore

Sixto Sanchez was matched for the Marlins against Yu Darvish of the Cubs, with the latter making his first postseason start since the 2017 World Series. Already the first team to make the postseason after losing 100 games the previous season, the Marlins rode the arm of starter Sixto Sanchez for five innings before leaving it to the bullpen, which combined for a shutout. Brad Boxberger, who came in the sixth inning and pitched for one out in the seventh, received the win when the Marlins took the lead in the inning. Garrett Cooper hit a home run off Yu Darvish to break the tie. Miguel Rojas added in an insurance run not long after with a single after Matt Joyce reached with a double. Jason Heyward hit a leadoff double in the 9th inning to give the Cubs hope, but Brandon Kintzler struck out the next three batters, which included Jason Kipnis (the last at bat of his career), to end the game.

This was the last game for several members of the Cubs 2016 championship core, including Theo Epstein, who mutually parted ways with the team in November. In total from 2015 to 2020, they had made the postseason in all but one year and won a World Series; however since the close of the 2016 World Series, they lost nine of their next thirteen postseason games. For the Marlins, who had not made the postseason since the 2003 World Series, it was their first postseason series win in 17 years.

=== Composite line score ===
2020 NLWC (2–0): Miami Marlins beat Chicago Cubs

Team	1	2	3	4	5	6	7	8	9	R	H	E
Miami Marlins	0	0	0	0	0	0	7	0	0	7	13	4
Chicago Cubs	0	0	0	0	1	0	0	0	0	1	9	1
Total attendance: N/A Average attendance: N/A

== San Diego vs. St. Louis ==
This is the fourth postseason meeting between the Padres and Cardinals, with the Cardinals winning all three previous meetings in the Division Series. The Cardinals swept the Padres in 1996 and 2005, while they won in four games in 2006.

=== Game 1 ===
September 30, 2020 2:08 pm (PDT) at Petco Park in San Diego, California
Team	1	2	3	4	5	6	7	8	9	R	H	E
St. Louis	4	0	2	0	0	0	0	0	1	7	13	1
San Diego	1	1	1	0	0	1	0	0	0	4	8	0
WP: Giovanny Gallegos (1–0) LP: Chris Paddack (0–1) Sv: Alex Reyes (1); Home runs: STL: Paul Goldschmidt (1); SD: None; Attendance: N/A; Boxscore

Kwang Hyun Kim was matched for the Cardinals against Chris Paddack. Paddack got the first batter in the game out and proceeded to allow the next five batters to reach (which included a home run by Paul Goldschmidt) to make it 4-0. The Padres got one run back in the first, but they were playing catch-up the rest of the day, as Paddack allowed a total of six runs before being taken out with one out in the third inning. The Cardinals saw their starter last into the fourth inning after giving up three runs, but a combination of five bullpen arms held the Padres to one run in six innings of work. As of the conclusion of the 2025 season, this was the most recent postseason game won by the Cardinals.

=== Game 2 ===
October 1, 2020 4:08 pm (PDT) at Petco Park in San Diego, California
Team	1	2	3	4	5	6	7	8	9	R	H	E
St. Louis	1	3	0	0	0	2	0	2	1	9	10	1
San Diego	0	0	0	2	0	4	3	2	X	11	15	2
WP: Emilio Pagán (1–0) LP: Daniel Ponce de Leon (0–1) Sv: Trevor Rosenthal (1); Home runs: STL: Kolten Wong (1); SD: Fernando Tatís Jr. 2 (2), Manny Machado (1), Wil Myers 2 (2); Attendance: N/A; Boxscore

Wil Myers and Fernando Tatis Jr. were the first teammates each to hit two home runs in a postseason game since Babe Ruth and Lou Gehrig did it in the 1932 World Series. This is the first postseason victory for the Padres at Petco Park and the first home postseason victory overall since Game 3 of the 1998 NLCS. It is also the first postseason loss for the Cardinals at Petco Park after winning the first four postseason games in the venue's history.

=== Game 3 ===
October 2, 2020 4:08 pm (PDT) at Petco Park in San Diego, California
Team	1	2	3	4	5	6	7	8	9	R	H	E
St. Louis	0	0	0	0	0	0	0	0	0	0	4	2
San Diego	0	0	0	0	1	0	2	1	X	4	8	1
WP: Austin Adams (1–0) LP: Jack Flaherty (0–1); Home runs: STL: None; SD: Jake Cronenworth (1); Attendance: N/A; Boxscore

The Cardinals elected to use Jack Flaherty as their Game 3 starter while the Padres went with a "bullpen game" strategy, which would see them change pitchers at the end of nearly every inning, with Craig Stammen having been taken out with two out in the second inning. In the 5th inning, Fernando Tatis Jr. hit a double. With two out, Eric Hosmer hit a line-drive double to score Tatis. In the 7th, now with Flaherty out for Alex Reyes, the Padres took advantage on two errors. The first three batters all got on base, with a groundball by Trent Grisham leading to an error by second baseman Kolten Wong when he elected to try to throw out the runner at second base that went wide of the shortstop. After an intentional walk of Tatis, Manny Machado was up with the bases loaded. He hit a bouncing liner to Tommy Edman that he quickly fielded and tried to throw home to get the runner out, but the ball went out of the glove just as Jake Cronenworth made it in. Hosmer, with the bases loaded, was walked on five pitches to make it 3-0. Cronenworth then hit a home run in the 8th to close the scoring.

The Padres were the first team to win an elimination game using nine pitchers. It was also their first postseason series victory since 1998.

=== Composite line score ===
2020 NLWC (2–0): San Diego Padres beat St. Louis Cardinals

Team	1	2	3	4	5	6	7	8	9	R	H	E
St. Louis Cardinals	5	3	2	0	0	2	0	2	2	16	27	4
San Diego Padres	1	1	1	2	1	5	5	3	0	19	31	3
Total attendance: N/A Average attendance: N/A

== Broadcasting ==
The games were televised on the ESPN family of networks in the United States, with ABC showing the entire Cubs-Marlins series, with ESPN2 showing Game 1 of the Padres vs. Cardinals series and ESPN showing every other game.

== See also ==
- 2020 American League Wild Card Series
