= National League Central =

Division of Major League Baseball

- League: National League
- Sport: Major League Baseball
- Founded: 1994
- No. of teams: 5
- Most recent champions: Milwaukee Brewers (2026; 7th title)
- Most titles: St. Louis Cardinals (12)

National League Central Teams Location

The National League Central is one of Major League Baseball's six divisions. This division was created in 1994, by moving two teams from the National League West (the Cincinnati Reds and the Houston Astros) and three teams from the National League East (the Chicago Cubs, the Pittsburgh Pirates, and the St. Louis Cardinals).

When the division was created in 1994, the Pirates were originally supposed to stay in the East, while the Atlanta Braves were to be moved to the Central from the West. However, the Braves, wanting to form a natural rivalry with the expansion Florida Marlins, requested to be moved to the East instead. Despite the Marlins offering to go to the Central, the Pirates instead gave up their spot in the East to the Braves. Since then, the Pirates have tried several times unsuccessfully to be placed back in the East.

In 1998, the NL Central became the largest division in Major League Baseball when the Milwaukee Brewers were moved in from the American League Central, which gave them six teams. In 2013, the Astros moved to the American League West.

The Cardinals have the most division championships with twelve, trailed by the Brewers with seven division titles and the Cubs with six. The Astros won the division four times before leaving in 2013, and the Reds have won it three times. The Pirates have never won the NL Central.

With the Brewers winning the 2026 World Series, the National League Central joined the National League East and American League Central as one of three divisions in the Major Leagues in which all of its members have won a World Series title.

== Division membership ==
=== Current members ===
- Chicago Cubs – Founding member; formerly of the NL East
- Cincinnati Reds – Founding member; formerly of the NL West
- Milwaukee Brewers – Since 1998; formerly of the AL West, AL East, AL Central
- Pittsburgh Pirates – Founding member; formerly of the NL East
- St. Louis Cardinals – Founding member; formerly of the NL East

=== Former member ===
- Houston Astros – Founding member; formerly of the NL West; moved to the AL West in 2013

=== Membership timeline ===
Place cursor over year for division champ or World Series team.

NL Central Division^{[A]}
Years
94	95	96	97	98	99	00	01	02	03	04	05	06	07	08	09	10
Chicago Cubs
Cincinnati Reds
Houston Astros
St. Louis Cardinals
Pittsburgh Pirates
				Milwaukee Brewers^{[B]}												
NL Central Division^{[A]}
Years
11	12	13	14	15	16	17	18	19	20	21	22	23	24	25	26	27
Chicago Cubs
Cincinnati Reds
Houston Astros^{[C]}																
St. Louis Cardinals
Pittsburgh Pirates
Milwaukee Brewers
Team not in division Division Won World Series Division Won NL Championship

^{A} Creation of division due to the 1994 realignment into three divisions (with Chicago, Pittsburgh and St. Louis from NL East, and Cincinnati and Houston from NL West)
^{B} Milwaukee switched leagues due to the 1998 expansion, moving in from AL Central
^{C} Houston switched leagues after the 2012 season, and joined the AL West

== Champions by year ==
- Team names link to the season in which each team played

Year	Winner	Record	Win%	Playoff Results
1994§	No playoffs due to 1994–95 Major League Baseball strike			
1995	Cincinnati Reds (1)	85–59	.590	Won NLDS (Dodgers) 3–0; Lost NLCS (Braves) 4–0
1996	St. Louis Cardinals (1)	88–74	.543	Won NLDS (Padres) 3–0; Lost NLCS (Braves) 4–3
1997	Houston Astros (1)	84–78	.519	Lost NLDS (Braves) 3–0
1998	Houston Astros (2)	102–60	.630	Lost NLDS (Padres) 3–1
1999	Houston Astros (3)	97–65	.599	Lost NLDS (Braves) 3–1
2000	St. Louis Cardinals (2)	95–67	.586	Won NLDS (Braves) 3–0; Lost NLCS (Mets) 4–1
2001*	Houston Astros (4)	93–69	.574	Lost NLDS (Braves) 3–0
2002	St. Louis Cardinals (3)	97–65	.599	Won NLDS (Diamondbacks) 3–0; Lost NLCS (Giants) 4–1
2003	Chicago Cubs (1)	88–74	.543	Won NLDS (Braves) 3–2; Lost NLCS (Marlins) 4–3
2004	St. Louis Cardinals (4)	105–57	.648	Won NLDS (Dodgers) 3–1; Won NLCS (Astros) 4–3; Lost World Series (Red Sox) 4–0
2005	St. Louis Cardinals (5)	100–62	.617	Won NLDS (Padres) 3–0; Lost NLCS (Astros) 4–2
2006	St. Louis Cardinals (6)	83–78	.516	Won NLDS (Padres) 3–1; Won NLCS (Mets) 4–3; Won World Series (Tigers) 4–1
2007	Chicago Cubs (2)	85–77	.525	Lost NLDS (Diamondbacks) 3–0
2008	Chicago Cubs (3)	97–64	.602	Lost NLDS (Dodgers) 3–0
2009	St. Louis Cardinals (7)	91–71	.562	Lost NLDS (Dodgers) 3–0
2010	Cincinnati Reds (2)	91–71	.562	Lost NLDS (Phillies) 3–0
2011	Milwaukee Brewers (1)	96–66	.593	Won NLDS (Diamondbacks) 3–2; Lost NLCS (Cardinals) 4–2
2012	Cincinnati Reds (3)	97–65	.599	Lost NLDS (Giants) 3–2
2013	St. Louis Cardinals (8)	97–65	.599	Won NLDS (Pirates) 3–2; Won NLCS (Dodgers) 4–2; Lost World Series (Red Sox) 4–2
2014	St. Louis Cardinals (9)	90–72	.556	Won NLDS (Dodgers) 3–1; Lost NLCS (Giants) 4–1
2015	St. Louis Cardinals (10)	100–62	.617	Lost NLDS (Cubs) 3–1
2016	Chicago Cubs (4)	103–58	.640	Won NLDS (Giants) 3–1; Won NLCS (Dodgers) 4–2; Won World Series (Indians) 4–3
2017	Chicago Cubs (5)	92–70	.568	Won NLDS (Nationals) 3–2; Lost NLCS (Dodgers) 4–1
2018	Milwaukee Brewers (2)	96–67	.589	Won NLDS (Rockies) 3–0; Lost NLCS (Dodgers) 4–3
2019	St. Louis Cardinals (11)	91–71	.562	Won NLDS (Braves) 3–2; Lost NLCS (Nationals) 4–0
2020†	Chicago Cubs (6)	34–26	.567	Lost NLWC (Marlins) 2–0
2021	Milwaukee Brewers (3)	95–67	.586	Lost NLDS (Braves) 3–1
2022	St. Louis Cardinals (12)	93–69	.574	Lost NLWC (Phillies) 2–0
2023	Milwaukee Brewers (4)	92–70	.568	Lost NLWC (Diamondbacks) 2–0
2024	Milwaukee Brewers (5)	93–69	.574	Lost NLWC (Mets) 2–1
2025	Milwaukee Brewers (6)	97–65	.599	Won NLDS (Cubs) 3–2; Lost NLCS (Dodgers) 4–0
2026	Milwaukee Brewers (7)	103–59	.636	Won NLDS (Padres) 3–1; Won NLCS (Dodgers) 4–0; Won World Series (Rays) 4–1

§ – Due to the 1994–95 Major League Baseball strike on August 12, no official winner was awarded. Cincinnati was leading by half a game over Houston at the time of the strike.

* – The Astros and Cardinals finished with identical regular season records. Because the Astros won the season series 9–7 against the Cardinals, they were awarded the National League Central division title, and the Cardinals were declared the National League Wild Card team.

† – Due to the COVID-19 pandemic, the season was shortened to 60 games. By virtue of the eight-team postseason format used for that season, division runner-up St. Louis (30–28, .517) also automatically qualified for the playoffs.

== Other postseason teams ==
The wild card was introduced in 1994 and was initially assigned to the team with the best record in each league that did not win its division. The first year of implementation was 1995 as a player strike prematurely ended the 1994 season. Since implementation, each of the NL Central teams has won the wild card. In 2012, a second wild card was added to post-season play, and in 2022, a third was also added.

Year	Winner	Record	%	GB	Playoff Results
1998	Chicago Cubs*	90–73	.552	12.5	Lost NLDS (Braves) 3–0
2001	St. Louis Cardinals†	93–69	.574	0	Lost NLDS (Diamondbacks) 3–2
2004	Houston Astros	92–70	.568	13	Won NLDS (Braves) 3–2; Lost NLCS (Cardinals) 4–3
2005	Houston Astros	89–73	.549	11	Won NLDS (Braves) 3–1; Won NLCS (Cardinals) 4–2; Lost World Series (White Sox) 4–0
2008	Milwaukee Brewers	90–72	.556	7.5	Lost NLDS (Phillies) 3–1
2011	St. Louis Cardinals	90–72	.556	6	Won NLDS (Phillies) 3–2; Won NLCS (Brewers) 4–2; Won World Series (Rangers) 4–3
2012	St. Louis Cardinals**	88–74	.543	9	Won NLWC (Braves); Won NLDS (Nationals) 3–2; Lost NLCS (Giants) 4–3
2013	Pittsburgh Pirates**	94–68	.580	3	Won NLWC (Reds); Lost NLDS (Cardinals) 3–2
2013	Cincinnati Reds**	90–72	.556	7	Lost NLWC (Pirates)
2014	Pittsburgh Pirates**	88–74	.543	2	Lost NLWC (Giants)
2015	Pittsburgh Pirates**	98–64	.605	2	Lost NLWC (Cubs)
2015	Chicago Cubs**	97–65	.599	3	Won NLWC (Pirates); Won NLDS (Cardinals) 3–1; Lost NLCS (Mets) 4–0
2018	Chicago Cubs**	95–68	.583	1	Lost NLWC (Rockies)
2019	Milwaukee Brewers**	89–73	.549	2	Lost NLWC (Nationals)
2020††	St. Louis Cardinals**	30–28	.517	3	Lost NLWC (Padres) 2–1
2020††	Cincinnati Reds**	31–29	.517	3	Lost NLWC (Braves) 2–0
2020††	Milwaukee Brewers** ***	29–31	.483	5	Lost NLWC (Dodgers) 2–0
2021	St. Louis Cardinals**	90–72	.556	5	Lost NLWC (Dodgers)
2025	Chicago Cubs**	92–70	.568	5	Won NLWC (Padres) 2–1; Lost NLDS (Brewers) 3–2
2025	Cincinnati Reds** ****	83–79	.512	14	Lost NLWC (Dodgers) 2–0
2026	Chicago Cubs**	89–73	.549	14	Lost NLWC (Padres) 2–0

* – Defeated the San Francisco Giants in a one game playoff for the Wild Card, 5–3.

† – Finished with the same record as the Houston Astros, but Houston won the season series vs. the Cardinals that year, and were given the higher seed in the playoffs.

** – From 2012 to 2019, and in 2021, the Wild Card was expanded to two teams. Those teams faced each other in the Wild Card Game to determine the final participant in the National League Division Series. In 2020 only, eight teams, including the three division winners, played in a best-of-three Wild Card Series, with the winners advancing to the Division Series. Starting in 2022, the Wild Card field was increased to three teams, and along with the lowest-ranked division winner, qualified for the best-of-three Wild Card Series to determine the remaining two slots in the Division Series.

†† – Due to the COVID-19 pandemic, the season was shortened to 60 games.

*** – Finished with the same record as the San Francisco Giants but won the wild-card spot due to a superior intra-divisional record (Brewers went 19–21 vs. the NL Central while the Giants went 18–22 vs. the NL West).

**** – Finished with the same record as the New York Mets, but won the wild-card spot due to the Reds winning the season series 4–2.

== Season results ==
^{(#)}	Denotes team that won the World Series
^{(#)}	Denotes team that won the National League pennant, but lost World Series
^{(#)}	Denotes team that qualified for the MLB postseason

Season	Team (record)					
Season	1st	2nd	3rd	4th	5th	6th
1994: The National League Central was formed with five inaugural members. The Chicago Cubs, Pittsburgh Pirates and St. Louis Cardinals joined from the National League East. The Cincinnati Reds and Houston Astros joined from the National League West. Due to the player's strike, the remainder of the season was cancelled on August 12. The postseason and World Series was also cancelled.
1994	Cincinnati (66–48)	Houston (66–49)	Pittsburgh (53–61)	St. Louis (53–61)	Chicago Cubs (49–64)	
1995	^{(2)} Cincinnati (85–59)	Houston (76–68)	Chicago Cubs (73–71)	St. Louis (62–81)	Pittsburgh (58–86)	
1996	^{(1)} St. Louis (88–74)	Houston (82–80)	Cincinnati (81–81)	Chicago Cubs (76–86)	Pittsburgh (73–89)	
1997	^{(1)} Houston (84–78)	Pittsburgh (79–83)	Cincinnati (76–86)	St. Louis (73–89)	Chicago Cubs (68–94)	
1998: The Milwaukee Brewers joined from the American League Central.
1998	^{(2)} Houston (102–60)	^{(4)} Chicago Cubs^{[a]} (90–73)	St. Louis (83–79)	Cincinnati (77–85)	Milwaukee (74–88)	Pittsburgh (69–93)
1999	^{(3)} Houston (97–65)	Cincinnati^{[b]} (96–67)	Pittsburgh (78–83)	St. Louis (75–86)	Milwaukee (74–87)	Chicago Cubs (67–95)
2000	^{(2)} St. Louis^{[c]} (95–67)	Cincinnati (85–77)	Milwaukee (73–89)	Houston (72–90)	Pittsburgh (69–93)	Chicago Cubs (65–97)
2001	^{(1)} Houston^{[d]} (93–69)	^{(4)} St. Louis (93–69)	Chicago Cubs (88–74)	Milwaukee (68–94)	Cincinnati (66–96)	Pittsburgh (62–100)
2002	^{(3)} St. Louis (97–65)	Houston (84–78)	Cincinnati (78–84)	Pittsburgh (72–89)	Chicago Cubs (67–95)	Milwaukee (56–106)
2003	^{(3)} Chicago Cubs (88–74)	Houston (87–75)	St. Louis (85–77)	Pittsburgh (75–87)	Cincinnati (69–93)	Milwaukee (68–94)
2004	^{(1)} St. Louis (105–57)	^{(4)} Houston (92–70)	Chicago Cubs (89–73)	Cincinnati (76–86)	Pittsburgh (72–89)	Milwaukee (67–94)
2005	^{(1)} St. Louis (100–62)	^{(4)} Houston (89–73)	Milwaukee (81–81)	Chicago Cubs (79–83)	Cincinnati (73–89)	Pittsburgh (67–95)
2006	^{(3)} St. Louis (83–78)	Houston (82–80)	Cincinnati (80–82)	Milwaukee (75–87)	Pittsburgh (67–95)	Chicago Cubs (66–96)
2007	^{(3)} Chicago Cubs (85–77)	Milwaukee (83–79)	St. Louis (78–84)	Houston (73–89)	Cincinnati (72–90)	Pittsburgh (68–94)
2008	^{(1)} Chicago Cubs (97–64)	^{(4)} Milwaukee (90–72)	Houston (86–75)	St. Louis (86–76)	Cincinnati (74–88)	Pittsburgh (67–95)
2009	^{(3)} St. Louis (91–71)	Chicago Cubs (83–78)	Milwaukee (80–82)	Cincinnati (78–84)	Houston (74–88)	Pittsburgh (62–99)
2010	^{(3)} Cincinnati (91–71)	St. Louis (86–76)	Milwaukee (77–85)	Houston (76–86)	Chicago Cubs (75–87)	Pittsburgh (57–105)
2011	^{(2)} Milwaukee (96–66)	^{(4)} St. Louis (90–72)	Cincinnati (79–83)	Pittsburgh (72–90)	Chicago Cubs (71–91)	Houston (56–106)
2012	^{(2)} Cincinnati (97–65)	^{(5)} St. Louis (88–74)	Milwaukee (83–79)	Pittsburgh (79–83)	Chicago Cubs (61–101)	Houston (55–107)
2013: The Houston Astros left to join the American League West.
2013	^{(1)} St. Louis (97–65)	^{(4)} Pittsburgh (94–68)	^{(5)} Cincinnati (90–72)	Milwaukee (74–88)	Chicago Cubs (66–96)	
2014	^{(3)} St. Louis (90–72)	^{(4)} Pittsburgh (88–74)	Milwaukee (82–80)	Cincinnati (76–86)	Chicago Cubs (73–89)	
2015	^{(1)} St. Louis (100–62)	^{(4)} Pittsburgh (98–64)	^{(5)} Chicago Cubs (97–65)	Milwaukee (68–94)	Cincinnati (64–98)	
2016	^{(1)} Chicago Cubs (103–58)	St. Louis (86–76)	Pittsburgh (78–83)	Milwaukee (73–89)	Cincinnati (68–94)	
2017	^{(3)} Chicago Cubs (92–70)	Milwaukee (86–76)	St. Louis (83–79)	Pittsburgh (75–87)	Cincinnati (68–94)	
2018	^{(1)} Milwaukee^{[e]} (96–67)	^{(4)} Chicago Cubs (95–68)	St. Louis (88–74)	Pittsburgh (82–79)	Cincinnati (67–95)	
2019	^{(3)} St. Louis (91–71)	^{(5)} Milwaukee (89–73)	Chicago Cubs (84–78)	Cincinnati (75–87)	Pittsburgh (69–93)	
2020: Due to the COVID-19 pandemic, the season was shortened to 60 games. The postseason field was expanded to eight teams and the wild-card round became a best-of-three series.
2020	^{(3)} Chicago Cubs (34–26)	^{(5)} St. Louis (30–28)	^{(7)} Cincinnati (31–29)	^{(8)} Milwaukee^{[f]} (29–31)	Pittsburgh (19–41)	
2021	^{(2)} Milwaukee (95–67)	^{(5)} St. Louis (90–72)	Cincinnati (83–79)	Chicago Cubs (71–91)	Pittsburgh (61–101)	
2022	^{(3)} St. Louis (93–69)	Milwaukee (86–76)	Chicago Cubs (74–88)	Pittsburgh (62–100)	Cincinnati (62–100)	
2023	^{(3)} Milwaukee (92–70)	Chicago Cubs (83–79)	Cincinnati (82–80)	Pittsburgh (76–86)	St. Louis (71–91)	
2024	^{(3)} Milwaukee (93–69)	Chicago Cubs (83–79)	St. Louis (83–79)	Cincinnati (77–85)	Pittsburgh (76–86)	
2025	^{(1)} Milwaukee (97–65)	^{(4)} Chicago Cubs (92–70)	^{(6)} Cincinnati^{[g]} (83–79)	St. Louis (78–84)	Pittsburgh (71–91)	
2026	^{(1)} Milwaukee (103–59)	^{(5)} Chicago Cubs (89–73)	Pittsburgh (82–80)	St. Louis (77–85)	Cincinnati (75–87)	

Notes and tiebreakers

- ^{a} Chicago and San Francisco of the National League West were tied for the wild-card berth and played in a tie-breaker game. The Cubs won 5–3 to claim the wild-card spot.
- ^{b} Cincinnati and New York of the National League East were tied for the wild-card berth and played in a tie-breaker game. The Reds lost 5–0 and were eliminated from postseason contention.
- ^{c} St. Louis and Atlanta of the National League East were tied for the second and third seed, but the Cardinals claimed the second seed by winning the season series 4–3.
- ^{d} Houston and St. Louis were tied for the division championship and wild-card berth, but the Astros claimed the division crown by winning the season series 9–7, relegating St. Louis to the wild-card spot.
- ^{e} Milwaukee and Chicago were tied for the division championship and first wild-card berth and played in a tie-breaker game. The Brewers won 3–1 to claim the division crown, while the Cubs were relegated to the first wild-card spot.
- ^{f} Milwaukee and San Francisco of the National League West were tied for the second wild-card berth, but the Brewers clinched the final postseason spot due to a superior intra-division record (Milwaukee had a 19–21 record while San Francisco had an 18–22 record).
- ^{g} Cincinnati and the New York Mets of the National League East were tied for the third wild-card berth, but the Reds clinched the final postseason spot by winning the season series 4–2

== NL Central statistics ==
Team	Division championships			Postseason records (Note: Reflects postseason record of each team only during the team's time as a member of the NL Central)				
Team	Number	Year(s)	Most recent	Wild Card (Note: Number of times qualifying as a wild card team)	NLWC	NLDS	NLCS	World Series
Current teams in division
St. Louis Cardinals	12	1996, 2000, 2002, 2004–2006, 2009, 2013–2015, 2019, 2022	2022	5	1–3	11–3	4–7	2–2
Milwaukee Brewers	7	2011, 2018*, 2021, 2023, 2024, 2025, 2026	2026	3	0–4	4–2	1–3	1–0
Chicago Cubs	6	2003, 2007, 2008, 2016, 2017, 2020	2020	4	2–2	4–4	1–3	1–0
Cincinnati Reds	3	1995, 2010, 2012	2012	3	0–2	1–2	0–1	0–0
Pittsburgh Pirates	0	—	—	3	1–2	0–1	0–0	0–0
Former team in division
Houston Astros†	4	1997, 1998, 1999, 2001*	2001	2	0–0	2–4	1–1	0–1
Total	30	1995–present	2024	18	3‍–‍13	21‍–‍16	6‍–‍15	3‍–‍3

* – Won division via tiebreaker
† – Astros moved to the American League West beginning in 2013

Totals updated through conclusion of the 2024 postseason.

== Rivalries ==
- Cardinals–Cubs rivalry
- Brewers–Cubs rivalry
- Pirates–Reds rivalry

== See also ==
- National League East
- National League West
- American League East
- American League Central
- American League West
