= Jose Barrero =

Cuban baseball player (born 1998)

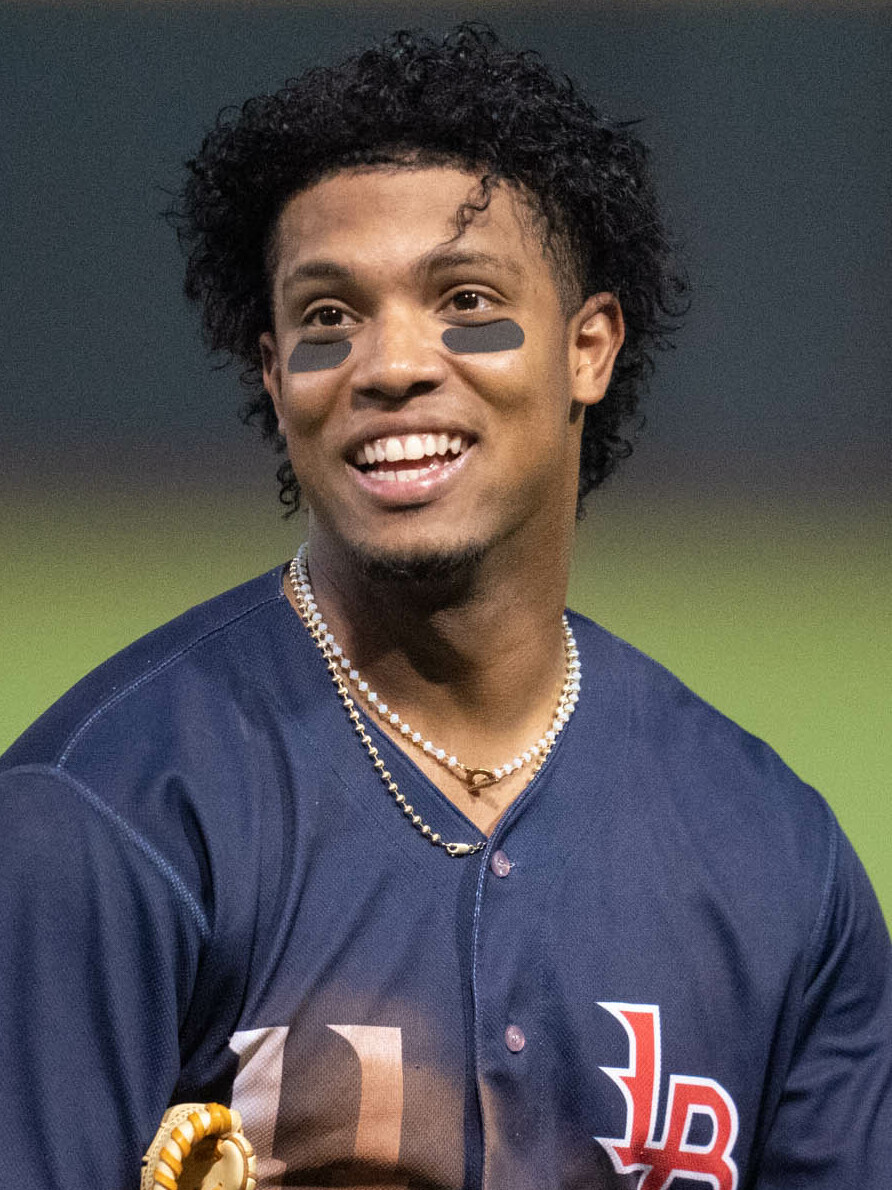
- Barrero with the Louisville Bats in 2023

Baltimore Orioles
- Utility player
- Born: April 5, 1998 (age 28); Havana, Cuba
- Bats: Right Throws: Right

MLB debut
- August 27, 2020, for the Cincinnati Reds

MLB statistics (through 2025 season)
- Batting average: .182
- Home runs: 5
- Runs batted in: 35
- Stats at Baseball Reference

Teams
- Cincinnati Reds (2020–2023); St. Louis Cardinals (2025); Baltimore Orioles (2026)

Jose Israel Barrero (born April 5, 1998), formerly known as Jose Garcia, is a Cuban professional baseball utility player in the Baltimore Orioles organization. He has previously played in Major League Baseball (MLB) for the Cincinnati Reds, and St. Louis Cardinals.

== Career ==
=== Cuban league ===
Barrero played for the Cuban national baseball team in the 2015 U-18 Baseball World Cup and in the Cuban National Series for the Industriales.

=== Cincinnati Reds ===
Barrero signed with the Cincinnati Reds as an international free agent on June 10, 2017. He made his professional debut in 2018 with the Single-A Dayton Dragons, playing in 125 games and hitting .245 with six home runs and 53 RBI. Barrero played 2019 with the High-A Daytona Tortugas, appearing in 104 contests and batting .280/.343/.436 with eight home runs, 55 RBI, and 15 stolen bases. After the season, he played in the Arizona Fall League. The Reds invited Barrero to Spring Training in 2020, but he was not immediately assigned to an affiliate after the minor league season was cancelled as a result of the COVID-19 pandemic.

Barrero made his MLB debut on August 27, 2020, against the Milwaukee Brewers. He hit .194/.206/.194 with no home runs and two RBI in 24 games for Cincinnati in his rookie campaign. Barrero began the 2021 season with the Double-A Chattanooga Lookouts, progressing to the Triple-A Louisville Bats later in the year. He appeared in 21 contests for the big–league club, hitting .200/.286/.320 with no home runs and three RBI.

On March 20, 2022, it was announced that Barrero would miss at least six weeks with a hamate injury in his left hand/wrist. He made his season debut on August 3. On August 6, Barrero hit his first major league home run off of Milwaukee Brewers starter Aaron Ashby. The two-run shot was part of a two-homer, three RBI game (the second homer coming off of Hoby Milner). In 48 games for the Reds, he slashed .152/.195/.206 with two home runs and 10 RBI.

In 2023, Barrero played in 46 games for the Reds, batting .218/.295/.323 with two home runs and 17 RBI. Prior to the 2024 season, it was announced that Barrero would begin working primarily as an outfielder.

=== Texas Rangers ===
On March 9, 2024, Barrero was claimed off waivers by the Texas Rangers. On March 27, he was removed from the 40–man roster and sent outright to the Triple–A Round Rock Express. In 49 games for Round Rock, he slashed .188/.277/.346 with six home runs, 25 RBI, and 10 stolen bases. Barrero elected free agency on November 1.

=== St. Louis Cardinals ===
On November 16, 2024, Barrero signed a minor league contract with the St. Louis Cardinals. He began the 2025 season with the Triple-A Memphis Redbirds, hitting .299 with four home runs, 13 RBI, and five stolen bases across 23 appearances. On April 28, 2025, the Cardinals selected Barrero's contract, adding him to their active roster. In 22 appearances for St. Louis, he slashed 138/.194/.276 with one home run and three RBI. On June 24, Barrero was designated for assignment by the Cardinals. He elected free agency on June 27, in part due to receiving interest from a team in Nippon Professional Baseball.

=== Baltimore Orioles ===
On July 2, 2025, Barrero signed a minor league contract with the Baltimore Orioles. In 53 appearances for the Triple-A Norfolk Tides, he batted .190/.261/.344 with eight home runs, 27 RBI, and nine stolen bases.

On October 2, 2025, Barrero re-signed with the Orioles organization on a minor league contract that included an invitation to spring training. He made 124 appearances for Triple–A Norfolk in 2026, slashing .202/.305/.400 with 23 home runs, 57 RBI, and 13 stolen bases. On September 16, 2026, the Orioles selected Barrero's contract, adding him to their active roster. He made two appearances for Baltimore, going 1–for–6 (.167); his only hit was a single off of Will Warren during a 6–3 loss to the New York Yankees on September 25. On October 29, Barrero was removed from the 40–man roster and sent outright to Norfolk, but he rejected the assignment and elected free agency.

On November 16, Barrero re-signed with the Orioles on a minor league contract for the 2027 season.

== Personal life ==
On May 29, 2021, he changed his name from Jose Garcia to Jose Barrero in honor of his mother, who died due to a COVID-19 related illness.
