= Bobby Wahl =

American baseball player (born 1992)

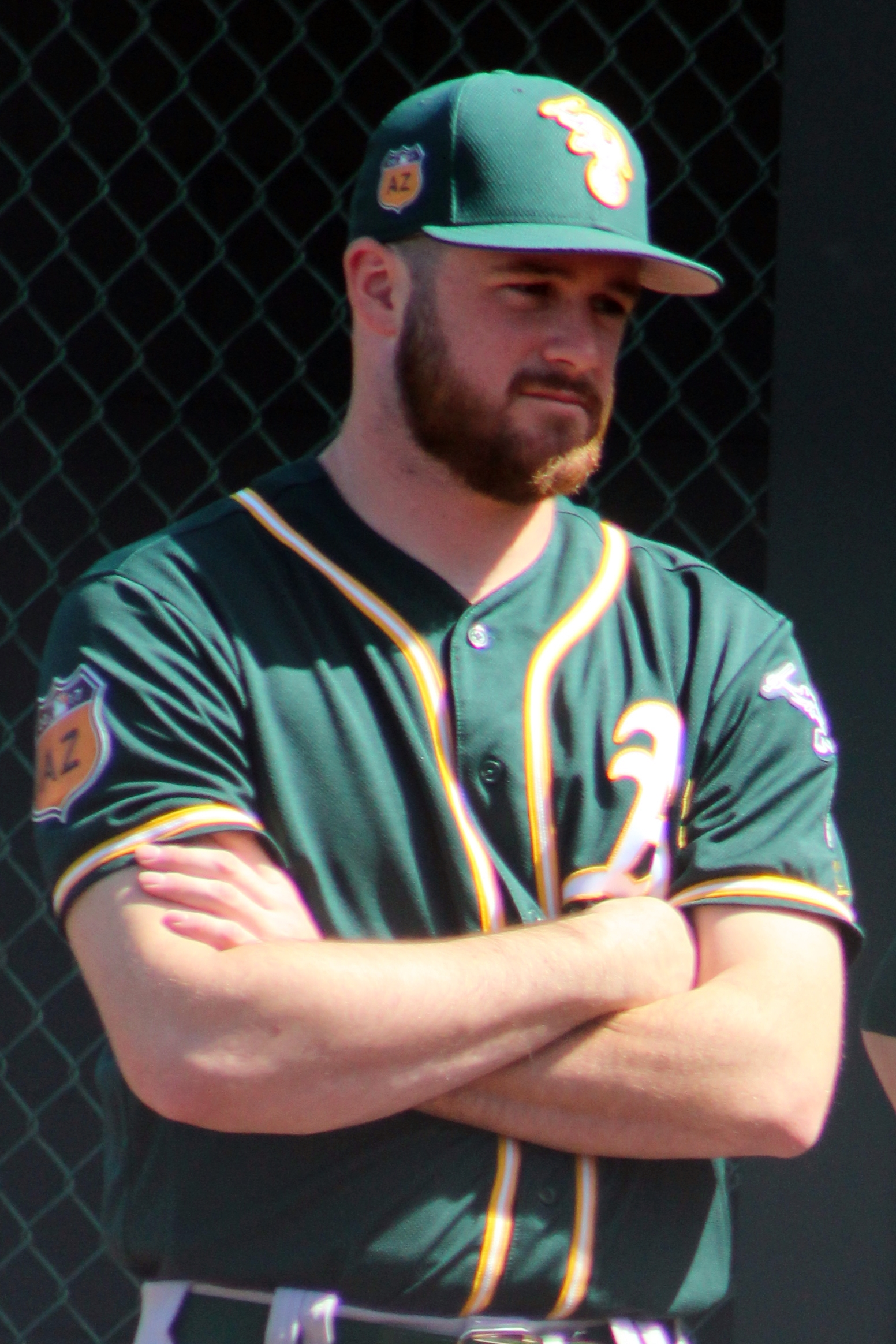
- Wahl with the Oakland Athletics
- Pitcher
- Born: March 21, 1992 (age 34); Springfield, Virginia, U.S.
- Batted: Right Threw: Right

MLB debut
- May 3, 2017, for the Oakland Athletics

Last MLB appearance
- July 28, 2020, for the Milwaukee Brewers

MLB statistics
- Win–loss record: 0–2
- Earned run average: 7.63
- Strikeouts: 16
- Stats at Baseball Reference

Teams
- Oakland Athletics (2017); New York Mets (2018); Milwaukee Brewers (2020)
Medals
Men's baseball
Representing the United States
Haarlem Baseball Week
Bronze medal – third place	2012	Team

Robert Martin Wahl (born March 21, 1992) is an American former professional baseball pitcher. He played in Major League Baseball (MLB) for the Oakland Athletics, New York Mets, and Milwaukee Brewers.

Wahl played college baseball for the Ole Miss Rebels. The Athletics selected him in the 2013 MLB draft, and he made his MLB debut for the Oakland Athletics in 2017, and was traded to the Mets in 2018. The Mets traded him to the Brewers before the 2019 season.

== Amateur career ==
Wahl attended West Springfield High School in Springfield, Virginia, where he played football, basketball, and baseball. When he enrolled at West Springfield, he began training with Brian Snyder, a former Major League Baseball (MLB) pitcher. As a senior, he pitched his high school's baseball team into the state championship game, finishing his high school career with a 28–1 win–loss record and 284 strikeouts. He was named the 2010 All-Met Player of the Year by the Washington Post. The Cleveland Indians selected Wahl in the 39th round of the 2010 MLB draft, but he did not sign.

Wahl enrolled at the University of Mississippi (Ole Miss), where he played college baseball for the Ole Miss Rebels baseball team. Wahl suffered elbow tendinitis during his freshman season. Though he began his career as a starting pitcher, he returned from injury as a relief pitcher, and finished the season as the Rebels' closer. After his 2011 freshman year at Ole Miss, Wahl played collegiate summer baseball for the Cotuit Kettleers of the Cape Cod Baseball League, where he was a closer and was named a league All-Star. After his sophomore year, he joined the United States national collegiate baseball team, recording two saves in a five-game series against the Cuban national baseball team.

In his junior year, Wahl shared the Southeastern Conference Pitcher of the Week Award on April 22, 2013, with Aaron Nola of the Louisiana State Tigers after recording his first career shutout in a game against the Tennessee Volunteers. Wahl finished the season with a 10–0 record and a 2.03 earned run average. He was named a second-team All-American by the National Collegiate Baseball Writers Association, and was projected to be a first-round pick in the upcoming MLB draft by Baseball America and MLB.com.

== Professional career ==
=== Oakland Athletics ===
The Oakland Athletics selected Wahl in the fifth round of the 2013 MLB draft, with the 161st overall selection. Wahl signed with the Athletics for a $500,000 signing bonus, almost double the recommended bonus for the draft position. In 2014, Wahl began the year with the Beloit Snappers of the Class A Midwest League, and was their Opening Day starting pitcher. Later in the season, the Snappers shifted Wahl to the bullpen. The Athletics promoted Wahl to the Stockton Ports of the Class A-Advanced California League later in the season, and assigned him to the Midland RockHounds of the Double-A Texas League in 2015.

Wahl began the 2016 season with Stockton, and received promotions to Midland and the Nashville Sounds of the Triple-A Pacific Coast League. He led all Athletics' minor leaguers with 14 saves. After the 2016 season, the Athletics added him to their 40-man roster. He began the 2017 season with Nashville, earning three saves and posting a 1.93 ERA with 14 strikeouts in 9 1/3 innings pitched. On May 3, the Athletics promoted Wahl to the major leagues. He made his major league debut that night, pitching in relief against the Minnesota Twins. He pitched 7 2/3 innings for Oakland before suffering a shoulder injury. He had surgery in August to correct thoracic outlet syndrome. The Athletics sent him outright to Triple-A after the season.

=== New York Mets ===
On July 21, 2018, the Athletics traded Wahl and Will Toffey to the New York Mets in exchange for Jeurys Familia. The Mets promoted Wahl to the major leagues on August 2. Wahl went on the disabled list on August 17 due to a strained hamstring. He pitched in seven games for the Mets, recording a 10.13 ERA in 5 1/3 innings.

=== Milwaukee Brewers ===
On January 5, 2019, the Mets traded Wahl, Adam Hill, and Felix Valerio to the Milwaukee Brewers for Keon Broxton. During spring training in 2019, Wahl tore the anterior cruciate ligament in his knee, ending his season. Wahl returned to game action following the 2019 season, playing for the Glendale Desert Dogs of the Arizona Fall League. In 2020 for Milwaukee, Wahl only appeared in three games, recording a 11.57 ERA with one strikeout in 2 1/3 innings pitched.

On April 10, 2021, Wahl was placed on the 60-day injured list with a right oblique strain. He was activated off of the injured list on May 31, and was optioned to the Triple-A Nashville Sounds. On June 30, Wahl was designated for assignment by the Brewers.

=== Los Angeles Dodgers ===
On June 30, 2021, Wahl was claimed off of waivers by the Los Angeles Dodgers and optioned to the Triple-A Oklahoma City Dodgers. He appeared in just two games in Oklahoma City, allowing three runs to score in one inning of work and exiting his final game on July 6 with an injury after just two pitches. Wahl was designated for assignment on July 13, and was released by the Dodgers organization the same day. Wahl re-signed with the Dodgers organization on a minor league contract on July 15.

Wahl made six appearances for Oklahoma City in 2022, but struggled to a 15.43 ERA with six strikeouts across 4 2/3 innings pitched. He was released by the Dodgers organization on July 31, 2022.
