= Sam Howard =

American baseball player (born 1993)

- Pitcher
- Born: March 5, 1993 (age 33); Cartersville, Georgia, U.S.
- Batted: Right Threw: Left

MLB debut
- June 10, 2018, for the Colorado Rockies

Last MLB appearance
- April 29, 2022, for the Pittsburgh Pirates

MLB statistics
- Win–loss record: 7–7
- Earned run average: 5.34
- Strikeouts: 112
- Stats at Baseball Reference

Teams
- Colorado Rockies (2018–2019); Pittsburgh Pirates (2020–2022)

Sam James Howard (born March 5, 1993) is an American former professional baseball pitcher. He previously played in Major League Baseball (MLB) for the Colorado Rockies and the Pittsburgh Pirates.

== Amateur career ==
Howard attended Cartersville High School in Cartersville, Georgia. Out of high school, the Chicago Cubs selected Howard in the 48th round of the 2011 MLB draft. He did not sign with Chicago, instead enrolling at Georgia Southern University, where he played college baseball for the Georgia Southern Eagles. In 2013, he played collegiate summer baseball with the Harwich Mariners of the Cape Cod Baseball League.

== Professional career ==
=== Colorado Rockies ===
The Colorado Rockies selected Howard in the third round, with the 82nd overall selection, of the 2014 MLB draft. He signed with the Rockies, receiving a $672,100 signing bonus. Howard made his professional debut with the Grand Junction Rockies of the Rookie-level Pioneer League, where he spent all of 2014, posting a 1–3 win–loss record with a 5.40 earned run average (ERA) in 14 games. In 2015, he played for the Asheville Tourists of the Class A South Atlantic League where he went 11–9 with a 3.43 ERA, along with a 1.22 WHIP. Howard began the 2016 season with the Modesto Nuts of the Class A-Advanced California League, and received a midseason promotion to the Hartford Yard Goats of the Class AA Eastern League. In 27 total games between Modesto and Hartford, Howard pitched to a 9–9 record and 3.35 ERA.

Howard was invited by the Rockies to 2017 spring training. He returned to Hartford to begin 2017, and after posting a 2.33 ERA and 0.88 WHIP in 46.1 innings, he was promoted to the Albuquerque Isotopes of the Class AAA Pacific Coast League, where he finished the season, going 4–4 with a 3.89 ERA. The Rockies added him to their 40-man roster after the season.

Howard began the 2018 season with Albuquerque. He made his major league debut on June 10. He threw four innings for the Rockies with a 2.25 ERA. He also had a 5.06 ERA in 21 games started for Albuquerque. The Rockies non-tendered him after the 2018 season. Howard later re-signed to a minor league contract on December 18, 2018. On July 21, 2019, the Rockies selected Howard's contract.

=== Pittsburgh Pirates ===
On October 30, 2019, Howard was claimed off waivers by the Pittsburgh Pirates. Becoming a relief pitcher in 2020, Howard had a 2-0 record and a 3.86 ERA with 27 strikeouts against nine walks in 21 innings pitched. In 2021, he had a 3-4 record and a 5.60 ERA in 45 innings.

Howard began the 2022 season with the Pirates, allowing two runs in two innings pitched before he was optioned to the Indianapolis Indians on May 2. On May 7, Howard was designated for assignment by the Pirates.

=== Detroit Tigers ===
On May 13, 2022, the Detroit Tigers claimed Howard off of waivers and assigned to their Triple-A affiliate, the Toledo Mud Hens. On July 5, Howard was designated for assignment. He cleared waivers and was outrighted to Toledo five days later. Howard elected free agency following the season on November 10.
