= Nik Turley =

American baseball player (born 1989)

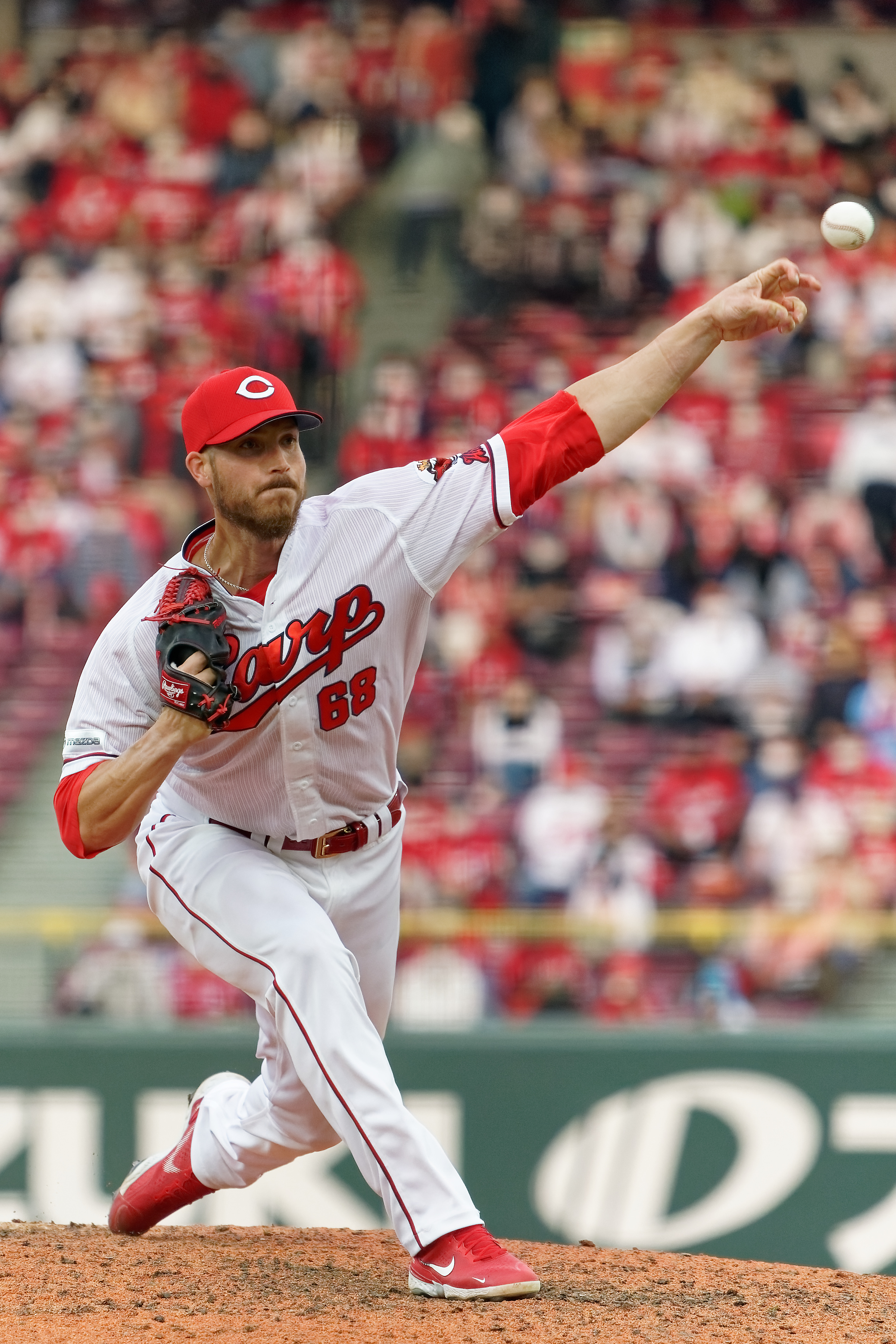
- Turley with the Hiroshima Toyo Carp

Free agent
- Pitcher
- Born: September 11, 1989 (age 37); La Cañada, California, U.S.
- Bats: Left Throws: Left

Professional debut
- MLB: June 11, 2017, for the Minnesota Twins
- NPB: May 3, 2022, for the Hiroshima Toyo Carp

MLB statistics (through 2020 season)
- Win–loss record: 0–5
- Earned run average: 7.78
- Strikeouts: 33

NPB statistics (through 2025 season)
- Win–loss record: 9–6
- Earned run average: 2.54
- Strikeouts: 88
- Stats at Baseball Reference

Teams
- Minnesota Twins (2017); Pittsburgh Pirates (2020); Hiroshima Toyo Carp (2022-2023); Tohoku Rakuten Golden Eagles (2024–2025)

Career highlights and awards
- NPB: NPB All-Star (2023)

Nikolas Carlyle Turley (born September 11, 1989) is an American professional baseball pitcher who is a free agent. He has previously played in Major League Baseball for the Minnesota Twins and Pittsburgh Pirates, and in Nippon Professional Baseball (NPB) for the Hiroshima Toyo Carp and Tohoku Rakuten Golden Eagles.

== Career ==
=== New York Yankees ===
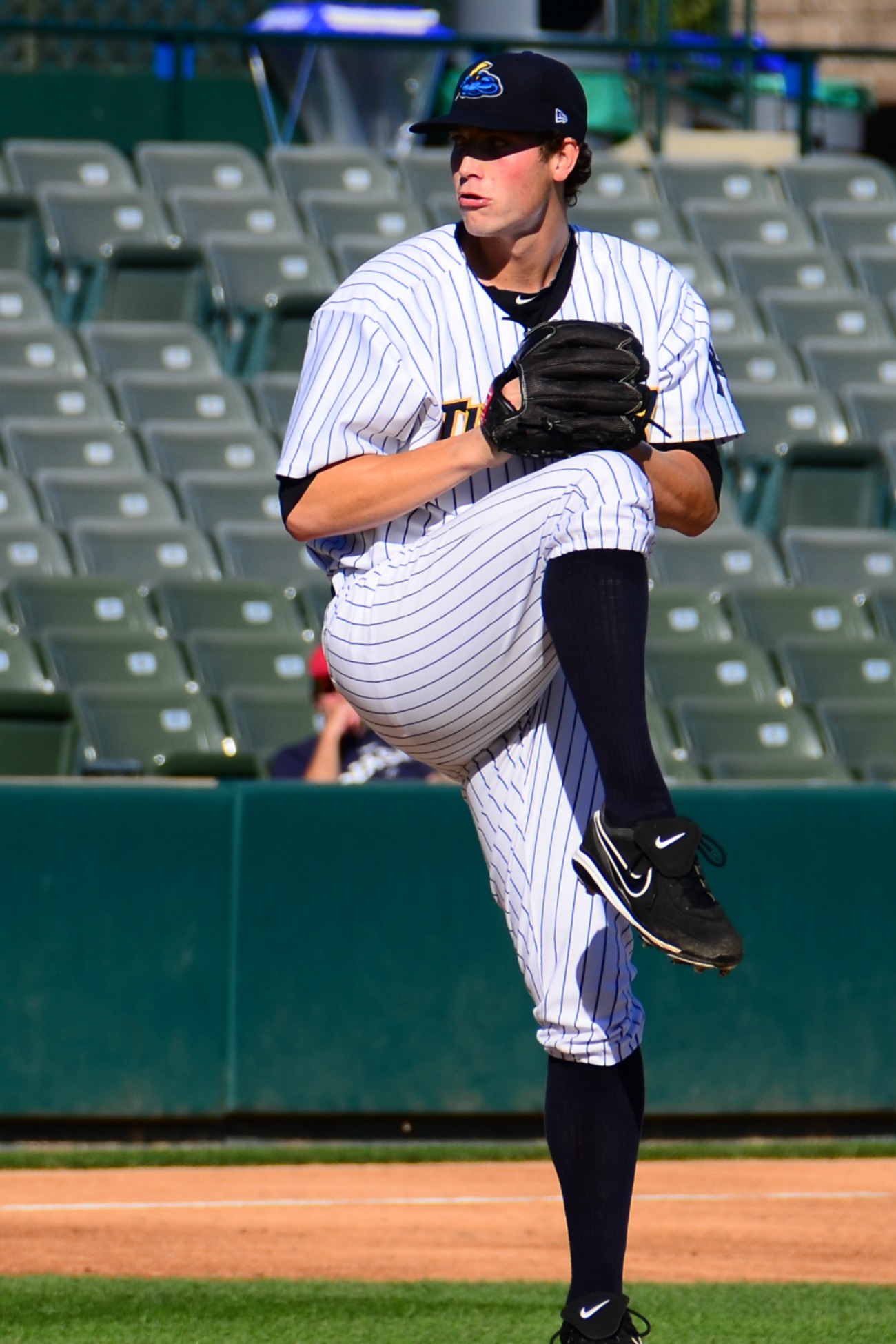
Turley with the Trenton Thunder

Turley attended Harvard-Westlake School, where he played for the school's baseball team. He committed to attend Brigham Young University (BYU) on a scholarship to play college baseball for the BYU Cougars baseball team. Out of high school, the New York Yankees selected Turley in the 50th round, with the 1,502nd selection, of the 2008 Major League Baseball draft. Turley was the third-to-last selection in the draft. Turley agreed to sign with the Yankees, forgoing college.

Turley spent the 2008 and 2009 seasons with the Gulf Coast Yankees of the Rookie-level Gulf Coast League. He pitched for the Staten Island Yankees of the Low-A New York–Penn League in 2010. He played with the Charleston RiverDogs of the Single-A South Atlantic League in 2011 and the Tampa Yankees of the High-A Florida State League in 2012. He was a Post-Season All-Star with Tampa. After the season, the Yankees named Turley their minor league pitcher of the year, and added him to their 40-man roster after the 2012 season to protect him from being selected by another team in the annual Rule 5 draft.

In 2013, Turley pitched for the Trenton Thunder of the Double-A Eastern League, and made one start for the Scranton/Wilkes-Barre RailRiders of the Triple-A International League. On the season, Turley had an 11–8 win–loss record with a 3.88 earned run average and was a Mid-Season All-Star with Trenton. He started and won Game One of the 2013 Eastern League Championship Series.

Attending spring training in 2014, Turley did not pitch due to arm tightness. The Yankees optioned Turley to the minor leagues. He was released by the team on April 26, 2014. Turley re-signed with the team on May 8.

=== San Francisco Giants ===
Turley signed a minor league contract with the San Francisco Giants organization on December 5, 2014. He made 20 starts split between the High-A San Jose Giants and Triple-A Sacramento River Cats, accumulating an 8–8 record and 4.39 ERA with 89 strikeouts across 108 2/3 innings pitched. Turley elected free agency on November 6, 2015.

=== Boston Red Sox ===
Turley signed a minor league contract with the Chicago White Sox on November 24, 2015. He was released prior to the start of the season on March 26, 2016.

Turley signed a minor league contract with the Boston Red Sox on April 11, 2016. In 20 appearances (two starts) for the Double-A Portland Sea Dogs, he logged a 1–2 record and 4.29 ERA with 48 strikeouts and two saves across 35 2/3 innings pitched. Turley was released by the Red Sox organization on July 8.

=== Somerset Patriots ===
On July 27, 2016, Turley signed with the Somerset Patriots of the Atlantic League of Professional Baseball. Turley made 10 appearances (eight starts) for the Patriots, compiling a 5–1 record and 2.02 ERA with 66 strikeouts over 49 innings of work.

=== Minnesota Twins ===
On October 23, 2016, Turley signed a minor league contract with the Minnesota Twins. He pitched for the Chattanooga Lookouts of the Double-A Southern League and Rochester Red Wings of the International League before the Twins promoted him to the major leagues on June 11.

Turley made his debut that day, starting against the San Francisco Giants. Turley allowed four runs on eight hits in four innings. He compiled a 16.39 ERA in 9 1/3 innings across three starts before being sent back down to Triple-A. Turley returned on August 18 and pitched out of the bullpen before being optioned two days later. He was called up again when rosters expanded in September. On the season, he allowed 22 earned runs in 17 2/3 innings.

=== Pittsburgh Pirates ===
On November 5, 2017, the Pittsburgh Pirates claimed Turley off of waivers. Turley was suspended for the first 80 games of the 2018 season after testing positive for a performance-enhancing drug. After returning from his suspension, Turley was placed on the disabled list with an elbow strain. He was removed from the 40-man roster and sent outright to the Triple-A Indianapolis Indians on October 4, 2018. Turley underwent Tommy John surgery and missed the 2019 season.

Turley was a non-roster invitee in big league camp in 2020 and even made the opening day roster, before the COVID-19 pandemic. He was included on the Pirates' 60-man player pool in June before the start of the shortened MLB season. On July 23, Turley was called up to the Pirates. He pitched to a 4.98 ERA with 20 strikeouts over 21 2/3 innings pitched in 25 appearances. On January 12, 2021, Turley was designated for assignment by the Pirates following the acquisition of Troy Stokes Jr.

=== Chicago White Sox (second stint) ===
On January 14, 2021, Turley was traded to the Oakland Athletics in exchange for cash considerations. On March 21, Turley was claimed off waivers by the Chicago White Sox. On March 30, Turley was designated for assignment following the signing of Jake Lamb. On April 1, he cleared waivers and was sent outright to the Triple-A Charlotte Knights. In 43 appearances out of the bullpen, Turley posted a 1–4 record and 5.02 ERA with 60 strikeouts and five saves over 43 innings of work. On October 14, Turley elected free agency.

=== Hiroshima Toyo Carp ===
On November 9, 2021, Turley signed with the Hiroshima Toyo Carp of Nippon Professional Baseball.

Turley made 44 appearances for Hiroshima in 2023, registering a 7–1 record and 1.74 ERA with 42 strikeouts across 41 1/3 innings of work. On November 30, 2023, the Carp announced that Turley would not be brought back for the 2024 season, making him a free agent.

=== Tohoku Rakuten Golden Eagles ===
On December 27, 2023, Turley signed with the Tohoku Rakuten Golden Eagles of Nippon Professional Baseball. He made 17 appearances for the Eagles in 2024, posting an 0–1 record and 2.93 ERA with 13 strikeouts and one save across 15 1/3 innings pitched.

Turley pitched in two games for Rakuten in 2025, but struggled to a 6.75 ERA with one strikeout across 1 1/3 innings pitched. On July 31, 2025, Turley was waived by the Eagles.

== Pitching style ==
Turley is 6 feet 5 inches (1.96 m) tall and weighs 225 pounds (102 kg). He uses his height to push the ball down into the strike zone and turns his body sideways as he throws to home plate. His pitches include a fastball that averages 90 to 91 miles per hour (145 to 146 km/h), a curveball that averages 77 to 79 miles per hour (124 to 127 km/h), and a changeup. Turley also generates a lot of spin rate on his pitches. In 2020, his fastball ranked in the top 5% and his curveball ranked in the top 15% throughout MLB.

== Personal life ==
Turley is a member of The Church of Jesus Christ of Latter-day Saints. He intends to serve as a missionary after he retires from baseball.

Turley has been married to Rachel Turley (née Johnson) since 2011. He grew up in La Cañada, California, and has three older brothers, who all played college sports. Turley describes former Yankee Bob Turley as a "distant relative".
