= Raisel Iglesias =

Cuban baseball player (born 1990)

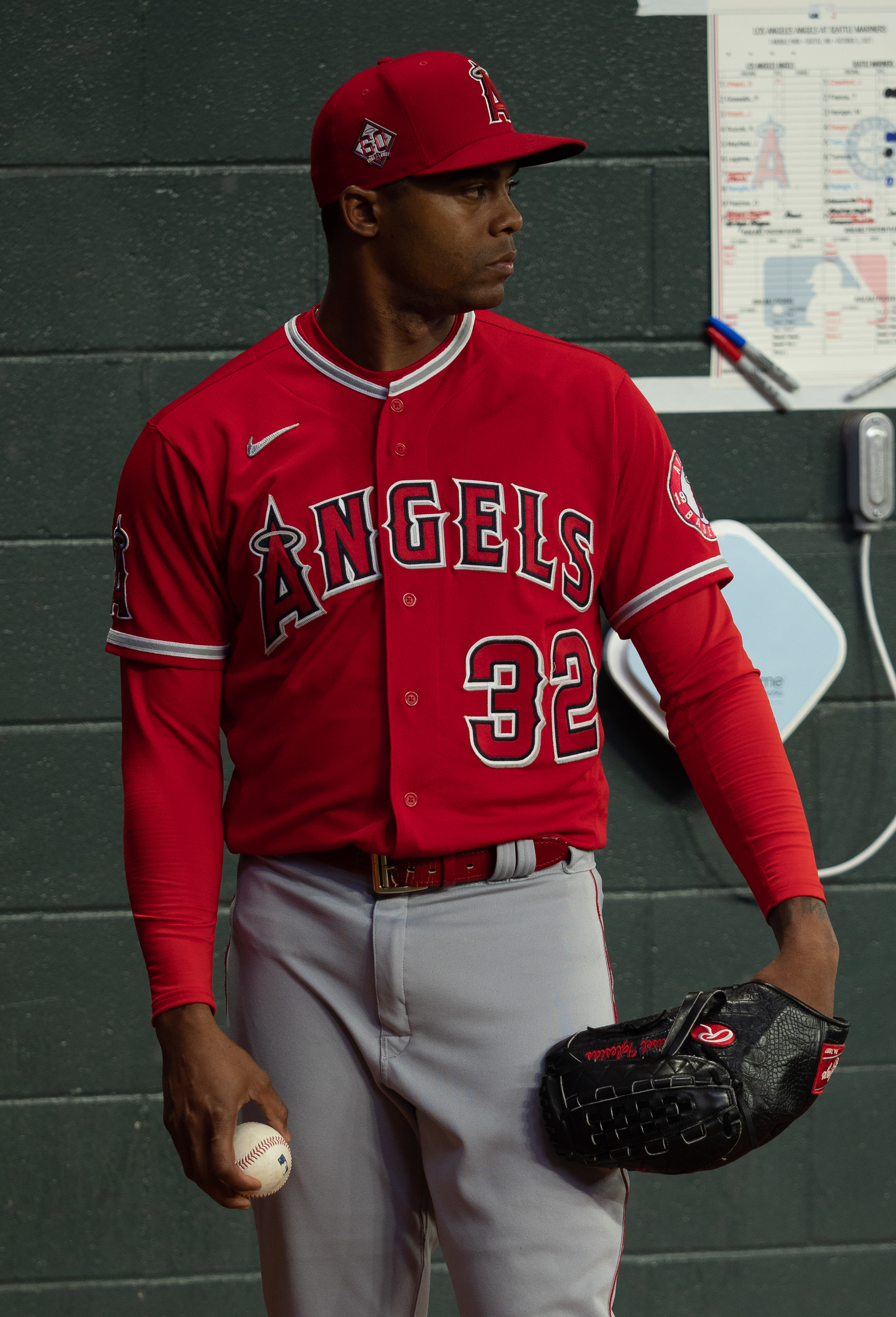
- Iglesias with the Los Angeles Angels in 2021

Free agent
- Pitcher
- Born: January 4, 1990 (age 36); Isla de la Juventud, Cuba
- Bats: Right Throws: Right

MLB debut
- April 12, 2015, for the Cincinnati Reds

MLB statistics (through 2026 season)
- Win–loss record: 43–57
- Earned run average: 2.87
- Strikeouts: 933
- Saves: 287
- Stats at Baseball Reference

Teams
- Cincinnati Reds (2015–2020); Los Angeles Angels (2021–2022); Atlanta Braves (2022–2026)

Career highlights and awards
- All-Star (2026)
Medals
Men's baseball
Representing Cuba
World Port Tournament
Gold medal – first place	2013 Rotterdam	Team

Raisel Enrique Iglesias (born January 4, 1990) is a Cuban professional baseball pitcher who is a free agent. He has played in Major League Baseball (MLB) for the Cincinnati Reds, Los Angeles Angels, and Atlanta Braves. He signed with the Reds as an international free agent in 2014 after defecting from Cuba. Iglesias was named to his first All-Star game in 2026.

== Career ==
=== Cuban career ===
Iglesias played for the Piratas de Isla de la Juventud in the Cuban National Series, and played for the Cuban national baseball team, appearing in the 2013 World Baseball Classic and 2013 World Port Tournament.

In September 2013, Iglesias attempted to defect from Cuba. He hid in the mountains of Isla de la Juventud, but was caught and was detained. In November of that same year, Iglesias successfully defected from Cuba. He established his residency in Haiti before holding an open tryout in Mexico in December 2013.

=== Cincinnati Reds ===
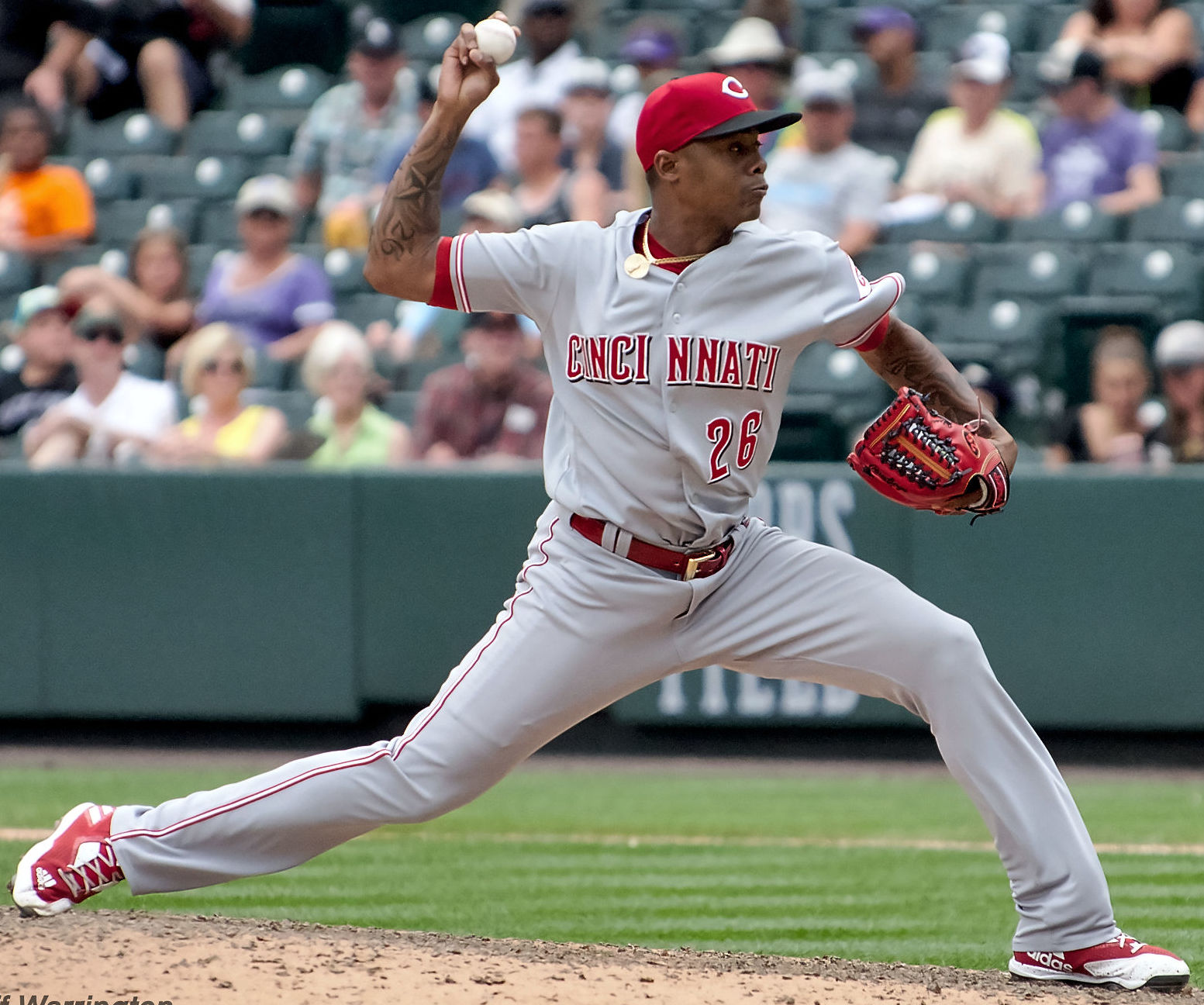
Iglesias pitching in 2017

On June 27, 2014, Iglesias signed with the Cincinnati Reds, to a seven-year contract worth $27 million. The Reds formally added him to their 40-man roster when he arrived in the United States on August 12.

In spring training in 2015, the Reds evaluated Iglesias as a starting pitcher. He started the season in the Reds' Opening Day starting rotation, and made his MLB debut on April 12. He had a couple of stints on the disabled list, limiting him to just 18 games, 16 of them starts. His record was 3–7 with 104 strikeouts. The following season, after beginning the season in the rotation, Iglesias was moved to the bullpen. Iglesias served as the setup man and closer for the Reds, finishing with six saves in 37 games. In 2019, Iglesias started the season as the Reds closer and ended the year with career-highs in saves (34) and appearances (68) and a 4.16 ERA. On August 8, 2020, Iglesias earned his 100th MLB career save against the Brewers. In 2020, Iglesias pitched to a 4–3 record and 2.74 ERA with 31 strikeouts in 23.0 innings of work.

=== Los Angeles Angels ===
On December 7, 2020, Iglesias was traded to the Angels for Noé Ramirez and Leo Rivas. With the Angels, Iglesias was named American League Reliever of the Month for July 2021. Iglesias finished the 2021 season with a 2.57 ERA, 103 strikeouts, and 34 saves. The 34 saves tied his career high, and he came up one strikeout short of tying his career high at 104.

On December 1, 2021, Iglesias re-signed with the Angels on a four-year, $58 million contract.

On June 26, 2022, after the brawl between the Angels and the Seattle Mariners, Iglesias threw a tub of sunflower seeds and a bucket of gum onto the infield. This was also the first ejection of his career.

=== Atlanta Braves ===
The Angels traded Iglesias to the Atlanta Braves for Jesse Chavez and Tucker Davidson on August 2, 2022. Iglesias made 28 appearances down the stretch for Atlanta, recording an 0.34 ERA with 30 strikeouts and one save across 26 1/3 innings pitched.

In 2023, Iglesias posted a 5-4 record with a 2.75 ERA, 68 strikeouts, and 33 saves in 55 2/3 innings pitched across 58 relief appearances. In 2024, Iglesias made 66 relief outings for the Braves, accumulating a 6-2 record with a 1.95 ERA, 68 strikeouts, and 34 saves in 69 1/3 innings of work.

On September 16, 2025, Iglesias recorded his 250th save as the Braves defeated the Washington Nationals in a 6-3 victory. In 70 appearances out of the bullpen for Atlanta, he compiled a 4-6 record and 3.21 ERA with 73 strikeouts and 29 saves across 67 1/3 innings pitched. Iglesias became a free agent following the end of the season.

On November 19, 2025, Iglesias re-signed with the Braves on a one-year, $16 million contract. Iglesias was selected to his first All-Star Game in July 2026.

== Personal life ==
Iglesias had a son during the 2018 season.

Awards
Preceded by Edwin Díaz	National League Reliever of the Month; August 2025	Most recent
