= 2021 Cincinnati Reds season =

2021 Cincinnati Reds
- League: National League
- Division: Central
- Ballpark: Great American Ball Park
- City: Cincinnati, Ohio
- Record: 83–79 (.512)
- Divisional place: 3rd
- Owners: Bob Castellini
- General managers: Nick Krall
- Managers: David Bell
- Television: Bally Sports Ohio (John Sadak, Jeff Brantley, Barry Larkin, Chris Welsh, Jim Day(sideline), Brian Giesenschlag (host), Sam LeCure (host), Charle Walter (fill in host)
- Radio: WLW (700 AM); Reds Radio Network (Tommy Thrall, Jeff Brantley, Chris Welsh)
- Stats: ESPN.com; Baseball Reference

The 2021 Cincinnati Reds season was the 152nd season for the franchise in Major League Baseball, and their 19th at Great American Ball Park in Cincinnati.

The first to be broadcast on the rebranded Bally Sports Ohio, it would also be memorable as the first for a new PBP television broadcaster for the Reds, John Sadak. This came after previous play-by-play announcer Thom Brennaman was fired during the previous season for his controversial homophobic remarks on the air during a game.

The Reds stayed in contention for most of the season after making the playoffs the previous year. However, a late September slump ultimately eliminated them from the postseason for the 7th time in the last 8 seasons and the 7th straight full season. Despite this, they still finished with a winning record at 83–79 to finish with back to back winning records for the first time since 2012 and 2013.

== Offseason ==
=== Trades ===
- December 7, 2020: Traded reliever Raisel Iglesias to the Los Angeles Angels for reliever Noe Ramirez and a player to be named later, subsequently announced as Leo Rivas.

=== Signings ===
- February 8, 2021: Signed reliever Sean Doolittle a one-year, $1.5 million contract.

== Regular season ==
=== National League Central ===
NL Central
Team	W	L	Pct.	GB	Home	Road
Milwaukee Brewers	95	67	.586	—	45‍–‍36	50‍–‍31
St. Louis Cardinals	90	72	.556	5	45‍–‍36	45‍–‍36
Cincinnati Reds	83	79	.512	12	44‍–‍37	39‍–‍42
Chicago Cubs	71	91	.438	24	39‍–‍42	32‍–‍49
Pittsburgh Pirates	61	101	.377	34	37‍–‍44	24‍–‍57

=== National League Wildcard ===
Division leaders
Team	W	L	Pct.
San Francisco Giants	107	55	.660
Milwaukee Brewers	95	67	.586
Atlanta Braves	88	73	.547

Wild Card teams (Top 2 teams qualify for postseason)
Team	W	L	Pct.	GB
Los Angeles Dodgers	106	56	.654	+16
St. Louis Cardinals	90	72	.556	—
Cincinnati Reds	83	79	.512	7
Philadelphia Phillies	82	80	.506	8
San Diego Padres	79	83	.488	11
New York Mets	77	85	.475	13
Colorado Rockies	74	87	.460	15½
Chicago Cubs	71	91	.438	19
Miami Marlins	67	95	.414	23
Washington Nationals	65	97	.401	25
Pittsburgh Pirates	61	101	.377	29
Arizona Diamondbacks	52	110	.321	38

=== Record vs. opponents ===
2021 National League record Source: MLB Standings Grid – 2021
Team	AZ	ATL	CHC	CIN	COL	LAD	MIA	MIL	NYM	PHI	PIT	SD	SF	STL	WSH	AL
Arizona	—	3–4	2–4	5–1	9–10	3–16	2–5	1–6	1–5	4–3	4–2	8–11	2–17	1–6	3–4	4–16
Atlanta	4–3	—	5–2	4–3	2–4	2–4	11–8	3–3	10–9	10–9	4–3	4–2	3–3	6–1	14–5	6–14
Chicago	4–2	2–5	—	8–11	3–3	4–3	1–5	4–15	4–3	2–5	14–5	5–1	1–6	9–10	4–3	6–14
Cincinnati	1–5	3–4	11–8	—	5–2	3–3	5–2	9–10	3–3	4–2	13–6	1–6	1–6	10–9	5–2	9–11
Colorado	10–9	4–2	3–3	2–5	—	6–13	4–2	2–5	2–5	5–2	4–2	11–8	4–15	3–4	4–2	10–10
Los Angeles	16–3	4–2	3–4	3–3	13–6	—	3–4	4–3	6–1	4–2	6–0	12–7	9–10	4–3	7–0	12–8
Miami	5–2	8–11	5–1	2–5	2–4	4–3	—	3–3	9–10	10–9	2–5	3–4	3–4	0–6	8–11	3–17
Milwaukee	6–1	3–3	15–4	10–9	5–2	3–4	3–3	—	4–2	2–5	14–5	5–2	4–3	8–11	5–1	8–12
New York	5–1	9–10	3–4	3–3	5–2	1–6	10–9	2–4	—	9–10	3–4	4–3	1–5	2–5	11–8	9–11
Philadelphia	3–4	9–10	5–2	2–4	2–5	2–4	9–10	5–2	10–9	—	4–3	4–2	2–4	4–3	13–6	8–12
Pittsburgh	2–4	3–4	5–14	6–13	2–4	0–6	5–2	5–14	4–3	3–4	—	3–4	4–3	7–12	2–4	10–10
San Diego	11–8	2–4	1–5	6–1	8–11	7–12	4–3	2–5	3–4	2–4	4–3	—	8–11	3–3	4–3	14–6
San Francisco	17–2	3–3	6–1	6–1	15–4	10–9	4–3	3–4	5–1	4–2	3–4	11–8	—	2–4	5–2	13–7
St. Louis	6–1	1–6	10–9	9–10	4–3	3–4	6–0	11–8	5–2	3–4	12–7	3–3	4–2	—	2–4	11–9
Washington	4–3	5–14	3–4	2–5	2–4	0–7	11–8	1–5	8–11	6–13	4–2	3–4	2–5	4–2	—	10–10

=== Game log ===
2021 Game Log: 83–79 (Home: 44–36; Away: 39–43)
April: 12–13 (Home: 8–5; Away: 4–8)

#	Date	Opponent	Score	Win	Loss	Save	Attendance	Record	Streak
1	April 1	Cardinals	6–11	Gallegos (1–0)	**Castillo** (0–1)	—	12,695	0–1	L1
2	April 3	Cardinals	9–6	**Mahle** (1–0)	Wainwright (0–1)	—	12,213	1–1	W1
3	April 4	Cardinals	12–1	**Hoffman** (1–0)	Martínez (0–1)	—	11,629	2–1	W2
4	April 5	Pirates	5–3	**Doolittle** (1–0)	Howard (1–1)	**Garrett** (1)	9,097	3–1	W3
5	April 6	Pirates	14–1	**Miley** (1–0)	Cahill (0–1)	—	11,093	4–1	W4
6	April 7	Pirates	11–4	**Castillo** (1–1)	Kuhl (0–1)	—	11,463	5–1	W5
7	April 9	@ Diamondbacks	6–5 (10)	**Pérez** (1–0)	Young (0–2)	**Garrett** (2)	19,385	6–1	W6
8	April 10	@ Diamondbacks	3–8	Smith (1–0)	**Hoffman** (1–1)	—	13,208	6–2	L1
9	April 11	@ Diamondbacks	0–7	Weaver (1–0)	**De León** (0–1)	—	10,981	6–3	L2
10	April 12	@ Giants	3–0	**Miley** (2–0)	Sanchez (0–1)	**Sims** (1)	3,662	7–3	W1
11	April 13	@ Giants	6–7	Peralta (2–0)	**Pérez** (1–1)	McGee (5)	3,673	7–4	L1
12	April 14	@ Giants	0–3	Cueto (2–0)	**Mahle** (1–1)	McGee (6)	6,409	7–5	L2
13	April 16	Indians	10–3	**Hoffman** (2–1)	Allen (1–2)	—	12,497	8–5	W1
14	April 17	Indians	3–2 (10)	**Doolittle** (2–0)	Pérez (0–1)	—	12,598	9–5	W2
15	April 18	Indians	3–6	Bieber (2–1)	**Miley** (2–1)	Clase (4)	12,551	9–6	L1
—	April 20	Diamondbacks	Suspended (Rain, continuation date: April 21)						
16	April 21	Diamondbacks	4–5	Bukauskas (1–0)	**Garrett** (0–1)	Crichton (2)	8,085	9–7	L2
17	April 21	Diamondbacks	5–8 (10)	Clarke (1–0)	**Pérez** (1–2)	—	8,025	9–8	L3
18	April 22	Diamondbacks	11–14 (10)	Smith (1–1)	**Sims** (0–1)	—	7,549	9–9	L4
19	April 23	@ Cardinals	4–5	Kim (1–0)	**Gray** (0–1)	Reyes (4)	13,196	9–10	L5
20	April 24	@ Cardinals	0–2	Gant (1–2)	**Miley** (2–2)	Gallegos (1)	13,176	9–11	L6
21	April 25	@ Cardinals	2–5	Flaherty (4–0)	**Castillo** (1–2)	Reyes (5)	13,348	9–12	L7
22	April 26	@ Dodgers	5–3 (10)	**Antone** (1–0)	Jansen (0–1)	—	15,199	10–12	W1
23	April 27	@ Dodgers	6–5	**Hendrix** (1–0)	Alexander (0–2)	**Doolittle** (1)	15,306	11–12	W2
24	April 28	@ Dodgers	0–8	Kershaw (4–2)	**Gray** (0–2)	—	15,052	11–13	L1
25	April 30	Cubs	8–6	**Miley** (3–2)	Arrieta (3–3)	**Antone** (1)	16,090	12–13	W1

May: 12–15 (Home: 4–8 Away: 8–7)

#	Date	Opponent	Score	Win	Loss	Save	Attendance	Record	Streak
26	May 1	Cubs	2–3	Brothers (1–0)	**Castillo** (1–3)	Kimbrel (5)	17,077	12–14	L1
27	May 2	Cubs	13–12 (10)	**Hendrix** (2–0)	Kimbrel (0–1)	—	16,755	13–14	W1
28	May 4	White Sox	0–9	Cease (2–0)	**Hoffman** (2–2)	—	10,209	13–15	L1
29	May 5	White Sox	1–0 (10)	**Sims** (1–1)	Hendriks (1–1)	—	10,247	14–15	W1
30	May 7	@ Indians	3–0	**Miley** (4–2)	Clase (2–2)	—	7,803	15–15	W2
31	May 8	@ Indians	2–9	Civale (5–0)	**Castillo** (1–4)	—	9,968	15–16	L1
—	May 9	@ Indians	Postponed (make-up date August 9)						
32	May 10	@ Pirates	14–1	**Mahle** (2–1)	Keller (2–4)	—	4,065	16–16	W1
33	May 11	@ Pirates	2–7	Brubaker (3–2)	**Hoffman** (2–3)	—	4,049	16–17	L1
34	May 12	@ Pirates	5–1 (10)	**Sims** (2–1)	Underwood Jr. (1–2)	—	4,515	17–17	W1
35	May 13	@ Rockies	8–13	Gonzalez (2–1)	**Castillo** (1–5)	—	13,647	17–18	L1
36	May 14	@ Rockies	6–9	Márquez (2–4)	**Miley** (4–3)	Bard (4)	20,232	17–19	L2
37	May 15	@ Rockies	6–5 (12)	**Sims** (3–1)	Santos (0–1)	**Hembree** (1)	20,136	18–19	W1
38	May 16	@ Rockies	7–6	**Doolittle** (3–0)	Givens (1–2)	**Antone** (2)	15,541	19–19	W2
39	May 17	Giants	3–6	Webb (3–3)	**Gray** (0–3)	Rogers (5)	11,004	19–20	L1
40	May 18	Giants	2–4	DeSclafani (4–1)	**Castillo** (1–6)	McGee (11)	8,745	19–21	L2
41	May 19	Giants	0–4	Gausman (4–0)	**Miley** (4–4)	—	10,326	19–22	L3
42	May 20	Giants	4–19	Cueto (3–1)	**Mahle** (2–2)	—	11,656	19–23	L4
43	May 21	Brewers	9–4	**Hoffman** (3–3)	Houser (3–5)	—	17,234	20–23	W1
44	May 22	Brewers	3–4	Suter (3–2)	**Hembree** (0–1)	Hader (10)	17,611	20–24	L1
45	May 23	Brewers	4–9	Boxberger (1–1)	**Castillo** (1–7)	—	16,171	20–25	L2
46	May 25	@ Nationals	2–1	**Mahle** (3–2)	Scherzer (4–3)	**Sims** (2)	8,935	21–25	W1
—	May 26	@ Nationals	Suspended (Inclement weather, Continuation May 27)						
47	May 27	@ Nationals	3–5	Voth (1–0)	**Hoffman** (3–4)	Hand (8)	7,343	21–26	L1
48	May 27	@ Nationals	3–0 (7)	**Gray** (1–3)	Strasburg (1–2)	**Sims** (3)	9,020	22–26	W1
49	May 28	@ Cubs	0–1	Alzolay (3–4)	**Gutiérrez** (0–1)	Kimbrel (12)	18,478	22–27	L1
50	May 29	@ Cubs	2–10	Thompson (3–1)	**Castillo** (1–8)	—	24,275	22–28	L2
51	May 30	@ Cubs	5–1	**Mahle** (4–2)	Arrieta (5–5)	**Antone** (3)	24,824	23–28	W1
52	May 31	Phillies	11–1	**Miley** (5–4)	Velasquez (2–1)	—	17,878	24–28	W2

June: 15–12 (Home: 7–7 Away: 8–5)

#	Date	Opponent	Score	Win	Loss	Save	Attendance	Record	Streak
53	June 1	Phillies	3–17	Nola (4–4)	**Gray** (1–4)	—	10,788	24–29	L1
--	June 2	Phillies	Postponed (make-up date June 28)						
54	June 3	@ Cardinals	4–2	**Gutiérrez** (1–1)	Wainwright (3–5)	**Sims** (4)	15,327	25–29	W1
55	June 4	@ Cardinals	6–4	**Castillo** (2–8)	Kim (1–4)	**Feliz** (1)	22,756	26–29	W2
56	June 5	@ Cardinals	5–2	**Mahle** (5–2)	Helsley (3–4)	**Sims** (5)	23,365	27–29	W3
57	June 6	@ Cardinals	8–7	**Hembree** (1–1)	Reyes (3–2)	**Sims** (6)	21,152	28–29	W4
58	June 8	Brewers	1–5	Houser (4–5)	**Hendrix** (2–1)	—	11,897	28–30	L1
59	June 9	Brewers	7–3	**Gutiérrez** (2–1)	Anderson (2–4)	—	11,862	29–30	W1
60	June 10	Brewers	2–7	Suter (7–3)	**Castillo** (2–9)	—	12,423	29–31	L1
61	June 11	Rockies	11–5	**Mahle** (6–2)	Freeland (0–2)	—	20,505	30–31	W1
62	June 12	Rockies	10–3	**Miley** (6–4)	Márquez (4–6)	—	23,765	31–31	W2
63	June 13	Rockies	6–2	**Hendrix** (3–1)	Senzatela (2–7)	—	18,268	32–31	W3
64	June 14	@ Brewers	10–2	**Gutiérrez** (3–1)	Lauer (1–3)	—	17,127	33–31	W4
65	June 15	@ Brewers	2–1 (10)	**Sims** (4–1)	Boxberger (2–2)	**Garrett** (3)	16,584	34–31	W5
66	June 16	@ Brewers	2–1	**Mahle** (7–2)	Peralta (6–2)	**Sims** (7)	20,088	35–31	W6
67	June 17	@ Padres	4–6	Johnson (2–2)	**Garrett** (0–2)	—	40,362	35–32	L1
68	June 18	@ Padres	2–8	Paddack (4–5)	**Santillan** (0–1)	—	33,456	35–33	L2
69	June 19	@ Padres	5–7	Crismatt (2–1)	**Hembree** (1–2)	Melancon (20)	38,765	35–34	L3
70	June 20	@ Padres	2–3	Lamet (2–2)	**Castillo** (2–10)	Melancon (21)	38,004	35–35	L4
71	June 21	@ Twins	5–7 (12)	Shoemaker (3–8)	**Hembree** (1–3)	—	17,530	35–36	L5
72	June 22	@ Twins	10–7	**Antone** (2–0)	Robles (3–4)	**Garrett** (4)	19,187	36–36	W1
73	June 24	Braves	5–3	**Santillan** (1–1)	Chavez (0–1)	**Brach** (1)	23,941	37–36	W2
74	June 25	Braves	2–3	Smyly (5–3)	**Gutiérrez** (3–2)	Smith (16)	30,231	37–37	L1
75	June 26	Braves	4–1	**Castillo** (3–10)	Anderson (5–4)	**Garrett** (5)	34,671	38–37	W1
76	June 27	Braves	0–4	Muller (1–1)	**Mahle** (7–3)	—	21,696	38–38	L1
77	June 28	Phillies	12–4	**Hembree** (2–3)	Feliz (0–1)	—	21,006	39–38	W1
78	June 29	Padres	4–5	Pagán (4–0)	**Santillan** (1–1)	Melancon (25)	16,332	39–39	L1
79	June 30	Padres	5–7 (6)	Musgrove (5–6)	**Gutiérrez** (3–3)	Hill (1)	12,084	39–40	L2

July: 16–10 (Home: 7–6 Away: 9–4)

#	Date	Opponent	Score	Win	Loss	Save	Attendance	Record	Streak
80	July 1	Padres	5–4	**Warren** (1–0)	Melancon (1–1)	—	16,620	40–40	W1
81	July 2	Cubs	2–1	**Osich** (1–0)	Mills (3–2)	**Hembree** (2)	40,854	41–40	W2
82	July 3	Cubs	3–2	**Hendrix** (4–1)	Alzolay (4–8)	**Hembree** (3)	36,815	42–40	W3
83	July 4	Cubs	3–2	**Warren** (2–0)	Winkler (1–1)	**Garrett** (6)	29,340	43–40	W4
84	July 5	@ Royals	6–2	**Gutiérrez** (4–3)	Minor (6–7)	—	14,709	44–40	W5
85	July 6	@ Royals	6–7	Lovelady (2–0)	**Hembree** (2–4)	—	14,491	44–41	L1
86	July 7	@ Royals	5–2	**Gray** (2–4)	Barlow (2–3)	**Hembree** (4)	11,457	45–41	W1
87	July 8	@ Brewers	3–5	Williams (6–1)	**Brach** (0–1)	Hader (21)	22,948	45–42	L1
88	July 9	@ Brewers	2–0	**Miley** (7–4)	Lauer (3–4)	**Hembree** (5)	24,844	46–42	W1
89	July 10	@ Brewers	4–3	**Osich** (2–0)	Hader (3–1)	**Hembree** (6)	32,034	47–42	W2
90	July 11	@ Brewers	3–1	**Hendrix** (5–1)	Hader (3–2)	**Osich** (1)	32,135	48–42	W3
ASG	July 13	AL @ NL	5–2	Ohtani (1–0)	Burnes (0–1)	Hendriks (1)	49,184	48–42	N/A
91	July 16	Brewers	6–11	Suter (9–4)	**Garrett** (0–3)	—	34,844	48–43	L1
92	July 17	Brewers	4–7 (11)	Gustave (1–0)	**Doolittle** (3–1)	—	37,204	48–44	L2
93	July 18	Brewers	0–8	Burnes (5–4)	**Gray** (2–5)	—	29,001	48–45	L3
94	July 19	Mets	11–15 (11)	Banda (1–0)	**García** (0–1)	May (3)	17,080	48–46	L4
95	July 20	Mets	4–3	**Miley** (8–4)	Nogosek (0–1)	**Garrett** (7)	19,096	49–46	W1
96	July 21	Mets	0–7	Stroman (7–8)	**Hoffman** (3–5)	—	19,896	49–47	L1
97	July 23	Cardinals	6–5	**Brach** (1–1)	Gallegos (5–3)	**Hembree** (7)	30,605	50–47	W1
98	July 24	Cardinals	5–3	**Castillo** (4–10)	Woodford (2–2)	**Hembree** (8)	33,489	51–47	W2
99	July 25	Cardinals	6–10	Helsley (5–4)	**Gray** (2–6)	—	21,947	51–48	L1
100	July 26	@ Cubs	5–6	Kimbrel (2–3)	**Hembree** (2–5)	—	29,215	51–49	L2
101	July 27	@ Cubs	7–4	**Gutiérrez** (5–3)	Alzolay (4–11)	—	28,153	52–49	W1
102	July 28	@ Cubs	8–2	**Mahle** (8–3)	Davies (6–7)	—	30,134	53–49	W2
103	July 29	@ Cubs	7–4	**Castillo** (5–10)	Mills (4–4)	—	32,793	54–49	W3
104	July 30	@ Mets	6–2	**Gray** (3–6)	Castro (2–3)	—	31,787	55–49	W4
105	July 31	@ Mets	4–5 (10)	Díaz (4–4)	**Cessa** (3–2)	—	26,477	55–50	L1

August: 16–12 (Home: 10–4 Away: 6–8)

#	Date	Opponent	Score	Win	Loss	Save	Attendance	Record	Streak
106	August 1	@ Mets	7–1	**Gutiérrez** (6–3)	Stroman (7–10)	—	23,443	56–50	W1
107	August 3	Twins	5–7	Coulombe (2–1)	**Hembree** (2–6)	Colomé (3)	18,396	56–51	L1
108	August 4	Twins	6–5	**Castillo** (6–10)	Barnes (0–2)	**Lorenzen** (1)	16,828	57–51	W1
109	August 5	Pirates	7–4	**Gray** (4–6)	Crowe (3–6)	**Givens** (1)	19,393	58–51	W2
110	August 6	Pirates	10–0	**Miley** (9–4)	Brubaker (4–11)	—	27,804	59–51	W3
111	August 7	Pirates	11–3	**Gutiérrez** (7–3)	Keller (3–9)	—	31,297	60–51	W4
112	August 8	Pirates	3–2	**Mahle** (9–3)	Wilson (2–5)	**Givens** (2)	23,740	61–51	W5
113	August 9	@ Indians	3–9	Garza (2–0)	**Castillo** (6–11)	—	10,708	61–52	L1
114	August 10	@ Braves	2–3	Smyly (8–3)	**Hembree** (2–7)	Smith (23)	24,432	61–53	L2
115	August 11	@ Braves	6–8 (11)	Santana (3–0)	**Sims** (4–2)	—	23,375	61–54	L3
116	August 12	@ Braves	12–3	**Gutiérrez** (8–3)	Muller (2–4)	—	23,395	62–54	W1
117	August 13	@ Phillies	6–1	**Mahle** (10–3)	Wheeler (10–7)	—	26,074	63–54	W2
118	August 14	@ Phillies	1–6	Moore (2–3)	**Castillo** (6–12)	—	25,100	63–55	L1
119	August 15	@ Phillies	7–4	**Sims** (5–2)	Nola (7–7)	**Givens** (3)	28,544	64–55	W1
120	August 16	Cubs	14–5	**Miley** (10–4)	Steele (2–2)	—	15,404	65–55	W2
121	August 17	Cubs	1–2	Hendricks (14–5)	**Gutiérrez** (8–4)	Heuer (1)	13,989	65–56	L1
122	August 18	Cubs	1–7	Rodríguez (1–2)	**Mahle** (10–4)	—	16,922	65–57	L2
123	August 19	Marlins	6–1	**Castillo** (7–12)	Neidert (1–2)	—	11,581	66–57	W1
124	August 20	Marlins	5–3	**Gray** (5–6)	Hernández (0–1)	**Givens** (4)	19,106	67–57	W2
125	August 21	Marlins	7–4	**Cessa** (4–2)	Bender (2–2)	**Lorenzen** (2)	34,443	68–57	W3
126	August 22	Marlins	3–1	**Gutiérrez** (9–4)	Alcántara (7–12)	**Lorenzen** (3)	17,797	69–57	W4
127	August 24	@ Brewers	4–7	Strickland (3–1)	**Lorenzen** (0–1)	Hader (27)	24,819	69–58	L1
128	August 25	@ Brewers	1–4	Woodruff (8–7)	**Castillo** (7–13)	—	24,715	69–59	L2
129	August 26	@ Brewers	5–1	**Gray** (6–6)	Anderson (4–8)	—	28,656	70–59	W1
130	August 27	@ Marlins	6–0	**Miley** (11–4)	Thompson (2–6)	—	7,119	71–59	W2
131	August 28	@ Marlins	1–6	Alcántara (8–12)	**Gutiérrez** (9–5)	—	10,407	71–60	L1
132	August 29	@ Marlins	1–2	Luzardo (5–7)	**Mahle** (10–5)	Floro (7)	11,019	71–61	L2
133	August 30	Cardinals	1–3	Lester (5–6)	**Castillo** (7–14)	Gallegos (3)	10,773	71–62	L3
—	August 31	Cardinals	Postponed (make-up date September 1)						

September/October: 12–17 (Home: 8–7 Away: 4–10)

#	Date	Opponent	Score	Win	Loss	Save	Attendance	Record	Streak
134	September 1 (1)	Cardinals	4–5 (7)	Cabrera (3–5)	**Miley** (11–5)	Gallegos (4)	10,365	71–63	L4
135	September 1 (2)	Cardinals	12–2 (7)	**Gray** (7–6)	Happ (8–7)	—	10,892	72–63	W1
136	September 3	Tigers	5–15	Holland (3–2)	**Gutiérrez** (9–6)	—	19,430	72–64	L1
137	September 4	Tigers	7–4	**Mahle** (11–5)	Boyd (3–8)	**Givens** (5)	26,962	73–64	W1
138	September 5	Tigers	1–4	Ureña (3–8)	**Castillo** (7–15)	Soto (18)	23,083	73–65	L1
139	September 6	@ Cubs	3–4	Effross (2–0)	**Lorenzen** (0–2)	Morgan (2)	27,289	73–66	L2
140	September 7	@ Cubs	4–3	**Miley** (12–5)	Sampson (0–2)	**Givens** (6)	24,925	74–66	W1
141	September 8	@ Cubs	1–4 (10)	Heuer (7–2)	**Brach** (1–2)	—	25,861	74–67	L1
142	September 10	@ Cardinals	4–2	**Lorenzen** (1–2)	McFarland (3–1)	**Givens** (7)	29,597	75–67	W1
143	September 11	@ Cardinals	4–6	Reyes (7–8)	**Sims** (5–3)	Gallegos (7)	33,404	75–68	L1
144	September 12	@ Cardinals	0–2	Happ (9–8)	**Gray** (7–7)	Gallegos (8)	32,872	75–69	L2
145	September 14	@ Pirates	5–6	Peters (1–2)	**Miley** (12–6)	Stratton (5)	8,896	75–70	L3
146	September 15	@ Pirates	4–5	Stratton (6–1)	**Givens** (3–3)	—	9,320	75–71	L4
147	September 16	@ Pirates	1–0	**Mahle** (12–5)	Ponce (0–4)	**Givens** (8)	9,102	76–71	W1
148	September 17	Dodgers	3–1	**Castillo** (8–15)	Buehler (14–4)	**Lorenzen** (4)	28,926	77–71	W2
149	September 18	Dodgers	1–5	Scherzer (15–4)	**Gray** (7–8)	Jansen (34)	29,861	77–72	L1
150	September 19	Dodgers	5–8	Kershaw (10–7)	**Miley** (12–7)	—	26,621	77–73	L2
151	September 20	Pirates	9–5	**Cessa** (5–2)	Ponce (0–5)	—	17,086	78–73	W1
152	September 21	Pirates	2–6	Keller (5–11)	**Mahle** (12–6)	—	9,475	78–74	L1
—	September 22	Pirates	Postponed (rain, makeup September 27)						
153	September 23	Nationals	2–3	Corbin (9–15)	**Castillo** (8–16)	Finnegan (11)	11,836	78–75	L2
154	September 24	Nationals	8–7 (11)	**Warren** (3–0)	Thompson (1–2)	—	16,021	79–75	W1
155	September 25	Nationals	7–6	**Givens** (4–3)	Murphy (0–3)	—	18,293	80–75	W2
156	September 26	Nationals	9–2	**Mahle** (13–6)	Rogers (2–1)	—	21,328	81–75	W3
157	September 27	Pirates	13–1	**Sanmartín** (1–0)	Overton (0–1)	—	11,055	82–75	W4
158	September 28	@ White Sox	1–7	López (4–3)	**O'Brien** (0–1)	—	25,242	82–76	L1
159	September 29	@ White Sox	1–6	Rodón (13–5)	**Gray** (7–9)	—	23,018	82–77	L2
160	October 1	@ Pirates	2–9	Stratton (7–1)	**Garrett** (0–4)	—	13,582	82–78	L3
161	October 2	@ Pirates	6–8	Mears (1–0)	**Santillan** (1–3)	Stratton (8)	22,910	82–79	L4
162	October 3	@ Pirates	6–3	**Sanmartin** (2–0)	Ponce (0–6)	—	13,011	83–79	W1

Legend: = Win = Loss = Postponement
Bold = Reds team member

== Roster ==
2021 Cincinnati Reds
Roster
Pitchers: 51 R. J. Alaniz; 70 Tejay Antone; 46 Cam Bedrosian; 47 Brad Brach; 58 Luis Castillo; 85 Luis Cessa; 87 José De León; 63 Sean Doolittle; 46 Michael Feliz; 41 Carson Fulmer; 52 Édgar García; 50 Amir Garrett; 48 Mychal Givens; 75 Ashton Goudeau; 54 Sonny Gray; 53 Vladimir Gutiérrez; 55 Heath Hembree; 68 Ryan Hendrix; 23 Jeff Hoffman; 21 Michael Lorenzen; 30 Tyler Mahle; 22 Wade Miley; 55 Dauri Moreta; 57 Riley O'Brien; 35 Josh Osich; 43 Cionel Pérez; 47 Sal Romano; 52 Reiver Sanmartín; 64 Tony Santillan; 39 Lucas Sims; 77 Art Warren; 34 Justin Wilson	Catchers: 16 Tucker Barnhart; 37 Tyler Stephenson; Infielders: 38 José Barrero; 0 Alex Blandino; 3 Asdrúbal Cabrera; 17 Kyle Farmer; 27 Mike Freeman; 6 Jonathan India; 28 Alejo López; 9 Mike Moustakas; 7 Eugenio Suárez; 19 Joey Votto	Outfielders: 4 Shogo Akiyama; 44 Aristides Aquino; 2 Nicholas Castellanos; 26 Delino DeShields Jr.; 29 TJ Friedl; 26 Scott Heineman; 12 Tyler Naquin; 34 Mark Payton; 32 Max Schrock; 15 Nick Senzel; 33 Jesse Winker	Manager: 25 David Bell; Coaches: 45 Freddie Benavides (bench); 90 Delino DeShields (first base/infield); 91 Jose Duarte (bullpen catcher); 56 J. R. House (third base/catching); 92 Nate Irving (bullpen catcher); 65 Eric Jagers (assistant pitching); 36 Derek Johnson (pitching); 62 Joe Mather (assistant hitting); 89 Cristian Perez (assistant bullpen/advance scouting); 61 Jeff Pickler (game planning/outfield); 60 Lee Tunnell (bullpen); 88 Rolando Valles (associate); 59 Alan Zinter (hitting)

== Player stats ==
=== Batting ===
Note: G = Games played; AB = At bats; R = Runs; H = Hits; 2B = Doubles; 3B = Triples; HR = Home runs; RBI = Runs batted in; SB = Stolen bases; BB = Walks; AVG = Batting average; SLG = Slugging average

Player	G	AB	R	H	2B	3B	HR	RBI	SB	BB	AVG	SLG
Jonathan India	150	532	98	143	34	2	21	69	12	71	.269	.459
Nick Castellanos	138	531	95	164	38	1	34	100	3	41	.309	.576
Eugenio Suárez	145	505	71	100	23	0	31	79	0	56	.198	.428
Kyle Farmer	147	483	60	127	22	2	16	63	2	22	.263	.416
Joey Votto	129	448	73	119	23	1	36	99	1	77	.266	.563
Jesse Winker	110	423	77	129	32	1	24	71	1	53	.305	.556
Tyler Naquin	127	411	52	111	24	2	19	70	5	35	.270	.477
Tyler Stephenson	132	350	56	100	21	0	10	45	0	41	.286	.431
Tucker Barnhart	116	348	41	86	21	0	7	48	0	29	.247	.368
Mike Moustakas	62	183	21	38	12	0	6	22	0	18	.208	.372
Aristides Aquino	84	174	25	33	6	1	10	23	2	27	.190	.408
Shogo Akiyama	88	162	16	33	8	0	0	12	2	14	.204	.253
Max Schrock	53	125	19	36	7	2	3	14	1	8	.288	.448
Nick Senzel	36	111	18	28	4	0	1	8	2	12	.252	.315
Alex Blandino	43	70	9	14	4	0	0	5	1	8	.200	.257
Mike Freeman	37	59	6	11	0	0	0	3	1	5	.186	.186
José Barrero	21	50	4	10	4	1	0	3	1	3	.200	.320
Delino DeShields Jr.	25	47	4	12	5	0	1	6	2	9	.255	.426
TJ Friedl	14	31	9	9	1	0	1	2	0	4	.290	.419
Scott Heineman	19	30	5	3	0	0	2	3	0	3	.100	.300
Asdrubal Cabrera	20	26	0	2	0	0	0	2	0	3	.077	.077
Alejo López	14	23	3	6	0	0	0	0	0	0	.261	.261
Mark Payton	24	22	2	4	0	0	0	0	0	2	.182	.182
Pitcher totals	162	279	22	34	6	0	0	9	0	12	.122	.143
Team totals	162	5423	786	1352	295	13	222	756	36	553	.249	.431

=== Pitching ===
Note: W = Wins; L = Losses; ERA = Earned run average; G = Games pitched; GS = Games started; SV = Saves; IP = innings pitched; H = Hits allowed; R = Runs allowed; ER = Earned runs allowed; BB = Walks allowed; SO = Strikeouts

Player	W	L	ERA	G	GS	SV	IP	H	R	ER	BB	SO
Luis Castillo	8	16	3.98	33	33	0	187.2	181	94	83	75	192
Tyler Mahle	13	6	3.75	33	33	0	180.0	158	78	75	64	210
Wade Miley	12	7	3.37	28	28	0	163.0	166	64	61	50	125
Sonny Gray	7	9	4.19	26	26	0	135.1	115	67	63	50	155
Vladimir Gutiérrez	9	6	4.74	22	22	0	114.0	115	61	60	46	88
Jeff Hoffman	3	5	4.56	31	11	0	73.0	70	41	37	45	79
Amir Garrett	0	4	6.04	63	0	7	47.2	46	34	32	29	61
Lucas Sims	5	3	4.40	47	0	7	47.0	34	26	23	18	76
Tony Santillan	1	3	2.91	26	4	0	43.1	34	15	14	21	56
Heath Hembree	2	7	6.38	45	0	8	42.1	32	33	30	19	68
Sean Doolittle	3	1	4.46	45	0	1	38.1	40	21	19	18	41
Tejay Antone	2	0	2.14	23	0	3	33.2	17	8	8	13	42
Ryan Hendrix	5	1	5.97	36	0	0	31.2	33	23	21	16	35
Brad Brach	1	2	6.30	35	0	1	30.0	30	26	21	18	33
Michael Lorenzen	1	2	5.59	27	0	4	29.0	26	18	18	14	21
Luis Cessa	2	1	2.05	24	0	0	26.1	24	7	6	2	23
Carson Fulmer	0	0	6.66	20	0	0	25.2	26	20	19	13	24
Cionel Pérez	1	2	6.38	25	0	0	24.0	21	21	17	20	25
Mychal Givens	1	1	4.22	23	0	8	21.1	18	11	10	13	20
Art Warren	3	0	1.29	26	0	0	21.0	11	3	3	8	34
Sal Romano	0	0	5.23	14	0	0	20.2	20	14	12	9	12
José De León	0	1	8.35	9	2	0	18.1	22	17	17	11	33
Justin Wilson	0	0	2.81	21	0	0	16.0	14	5	5	7	14
Josh Osich	2	0	5.02	17	0	1	14.1	15	9	8	5	9
Reiver Sanmartín	2	0	1.54	2	2	0	11.2	12	2	2	2	11
Ashton Goudeau	0	0	4.00	5	0	0	9.0	8	4	4	9	5
Michael Feliz	0	0	16.20	9	0	1	6.2	13	12	12	4	9
Cam Bedrosian	0	0	11.12	6	0	0	5.2	10	7	7	6	7
Édgar García	0	1	16.62	5	0	0	4.1	10	10	8	1	4
Alex Blandino	0	0	9.82	4	0	0	3.2	4	5	4	4	1
Dauri Moreta	0	0	2.45	4	0	0	3.2	2	1	1	1	4
R. J. Alaniz	0	0	3.38	3	0	0	2.2	1	1	1	3	3
Max Schrock	0	0	0.00	2	0	0	1.2	0	0	0	0	1
Riley O'Brien	0	1	13.50	1	1	0	1.1	2	2	2	3	2
Mike Freeman	0	0	0.00	1	0	0	0.1	0	0	0	0	1
Team totals	83	79	4.40	162	162	41	1434.1	1330	760	702	617	1524

== Farm system ==
Level	Team	League	Manager
AAA	Louisville Bats	Triple-A East	Pat Kelly
AA	Chattanooga Lookouts	Double-A South	Ricky Gutiérrez
High-A	Dayton Dragons	High-A Central	Jose Moreno
Low-A	Daytona Tortugas	Low-A Southeast	Gookie Dawkins
Rookie	ACL Reds	Arizona Complex League	Bryan LaHair
Foreign Rookie	DSL Reds	Dominican Summer League	Luis Saturria
