= Fair Oaks Elementary School =

Fair Oaks Elementary School may refer to:

- an elementary school in Redwood City, California
- part of the Cobb County School District
