= Kennesaw Mountain High School =

Public high school in Kennesaw, Cobb County, Georgia, United States

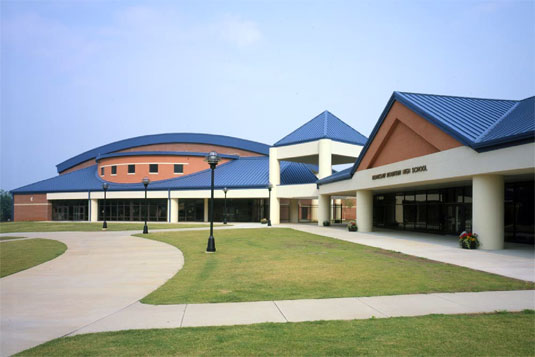

Location
- 1898 Kennesaw Due West Road NW; Kennesaw, Georgia 30152; United States; 33°59′56″N 84°37′26″W

Information
- School type: Public
- Established: 2000; 26 years ago
- School district: Cobb County School District
- Principal: Nathan Stark
- Teaching staff: 102.50 (FTE) (2023‍–‍2024)
- Grades: 9–12
- Enrollment: 1,666 (2023‍–‍2024)
- Student to teacher ratio: 15.84 (2023‍–‍2024)
- Colors: Green, Silver, and Black
- Nickname: Mustangs
- Rival: Harrison Hoyas; Allatoona Buccaneers
- Website: www.cobbk12.org/kennesawmountain

Kennesaw Mountain High School is a public high school located in Kennesaw, Cobb County, Georgia, United States. It was founded in 2000 as a magnet school specializing in science and mathematics, and is one of sixteen high schools in the Cobb County School District.

== History ==
=== Students ===
Kennesaw Mountain High School was founded in 2000. The 323,727-square-foot (30,075.2 m^{2}) high school, built on a 75-acre (300,000 m^{2}) site, was intended to have a capacity of 2,000 students, but due to the rapid population growth in Cobb County, the school quickly became overcrowded. Before the school was built, juniors, as opposed to freshman and sophomores, from Harrison High School (the main output) were given the choice whether to stay at their current school or change to Kennesaw Mountain. Approximately 240 juniors decided to change, which was much more than expected.

=== Construction ===
Construction of the five buildings at the campus began in August 1999 and was completed in 14 months. The design, by Passantino & Bavier, Inc., used steel bowstring joists to allow for an arched roofline and the 140-foot (43 m) clear span required for the gymnasium. Design and construction of the campus is the only Georgia project featured by the Steel Joist Institute. Included in the design, as requested by the school, was a plan so 70% of classrooms would have windows.

== Magnet program ==
The Academy of Mathematics, Science, & Technology at Kennesaw Mountain is one of seven magnet schools at the high school level in the Cobb County School District. For the class of 2023, the Academy of Mathematics, Science, & Technology at Kennesaw Mountain had an acceptance rate of 52%, and the class of 2026, of those who were accepted into the Magnet Program had an average 8th grade PSAT 8/9 NPR of 93% for Math (520), and 92% for Evidence Based Reading and Writing (540).

== Athletics ==
The Mustangs are a member of GHSA and participate in Region 7-AAAAAA. The school offers football, softball, cross country, volleyball, basketball, wrestling, swimming and diving, baseball, golf, marching band, lacrosse, soccer, tennis, and track and field.

== Notable alumni ==
- Robert Dunning (born 1997), American hurdler
- Corey Heim (born 2002), American racing driver
- Omar Jimenez (born 1993), American journalist, correspondent
- Ivan Johnson (born 1998), American baseball player
- Cayden Lee (born 2004), American football player
- Connor Lew (born 2005), American football player
- Tyler Stephenson (born 1996), American baseball player
