= Tyler Stephenson =

American baseball player (born 1996)

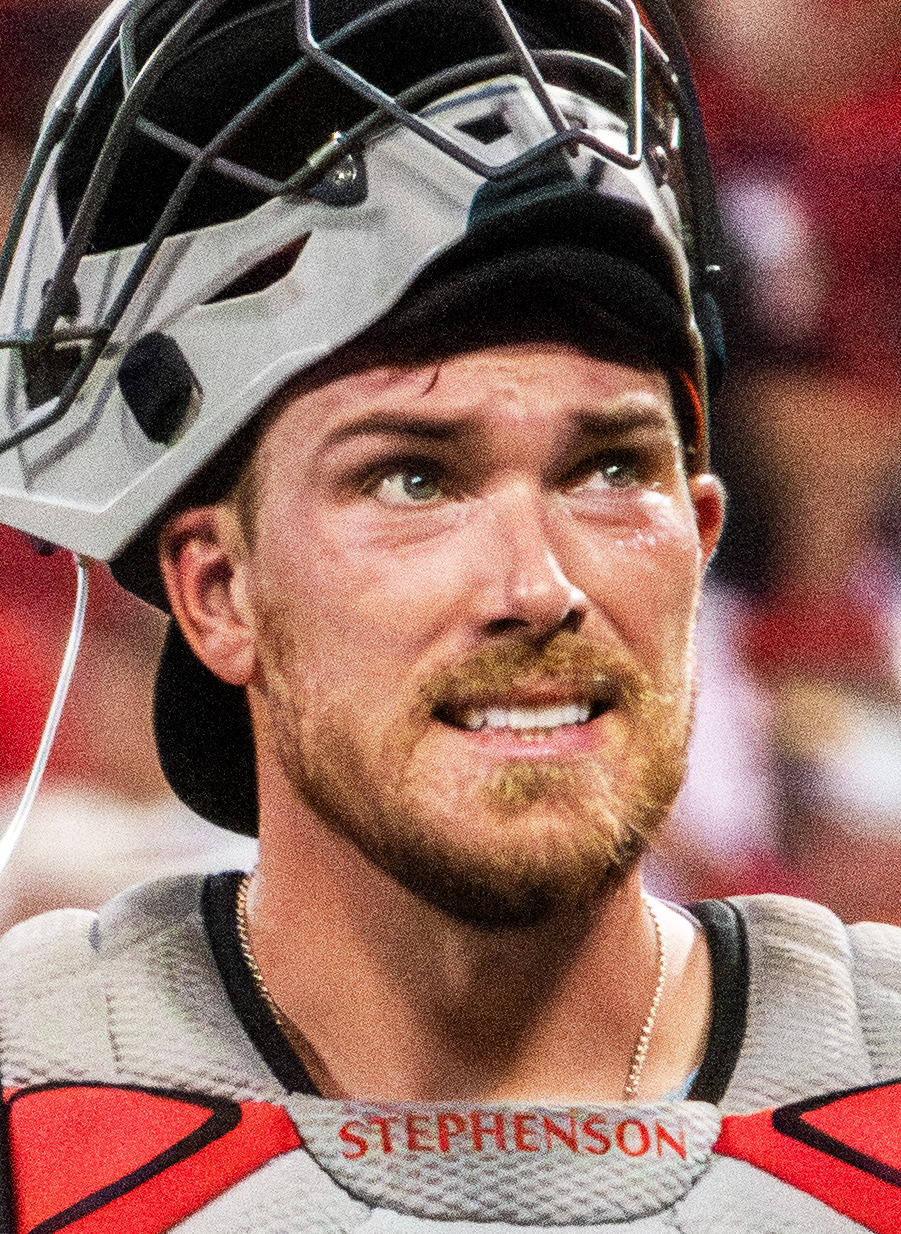
- Stephenson with the Cincinnati Reds in 2025

Free agent
- Catcher
- Born: August 16, 1996 (age 30); Atlanta, Georgia, U.S.
- Bats: Right Throws: Right

MLB debut
- July 27, 2020, for the Cincinnati Reds

MLB statistics (through 2026 season)
- Batting average: .257
- Home runs: 78
- Runs batted in: 312
- Stats at Baseball Reference

Teams
- Cincinnati Reds (2020–2026)

Tyler Robert Stephenson (born August 16, 1996) is an American professional baseball catcher who is a free agent. He has played in Major League Baseball (MLB) for the Cincinnati Reds. The Reds selected him in the first round, 11th overall, of the 2015 MLB draft.

Born in Atlanta and raised in Kennesaw, Georgia, Stephenson played for the baseball team at Kennesaw Mountain High School, where he began calling pitches during his freshman season. The Reds drafted Stephenson out of high school, and he chose to forego his college baseball commitment to begin his professional career in their farm system. Stephenson suffered significant injuries during consecutive minor league seasons in 2016 and 2017, but he remained healthy the next two years and received praise from Southern League managers as a defensive catcher.

The upheavals caused by the COVID-19 pandemic to MLB meant that Stephenson spent most of the 2020 season at an alternate training site rather than playing in Triple-A. He made his MLB debut that year, hitting a home run in his first major league plate appearance, but was used rarely, as the Reds had two catchers. When Curt Casali left the team prior to the 2021 season, Stephenson became Tucker Barnhart's backup catcher, and he also received significant time as a pinch hitter. Barnhart was traded after the 2021 season, allowing Stephenson to become the Reds' starting catcher in 2022.

== Early life ==
Stephenson was born on August 16, 1996, in Atlanta, Georgia, to Rhonda and David Stephenson. He was raised in the suburb of Kennesaw, Georgia, and frequently attended baseball games at Turner Field to watch Chipper Jones and the Atlanta Braves of Major League Baseball (MLB). A catcher for the baseball team at Kennesaw Mountain High School, Stephenson began telling the pitcher what to throw during his freshman year, as his coach wanted to prepare him for the game-calling responsibilities of professional catchers. Offensively, Stephenson batted .415 during his senior year, with eight home runs and 25 runs batted in (RBI).

== Professional career ==
=== Draft and minor leagues (2015–2019) ===
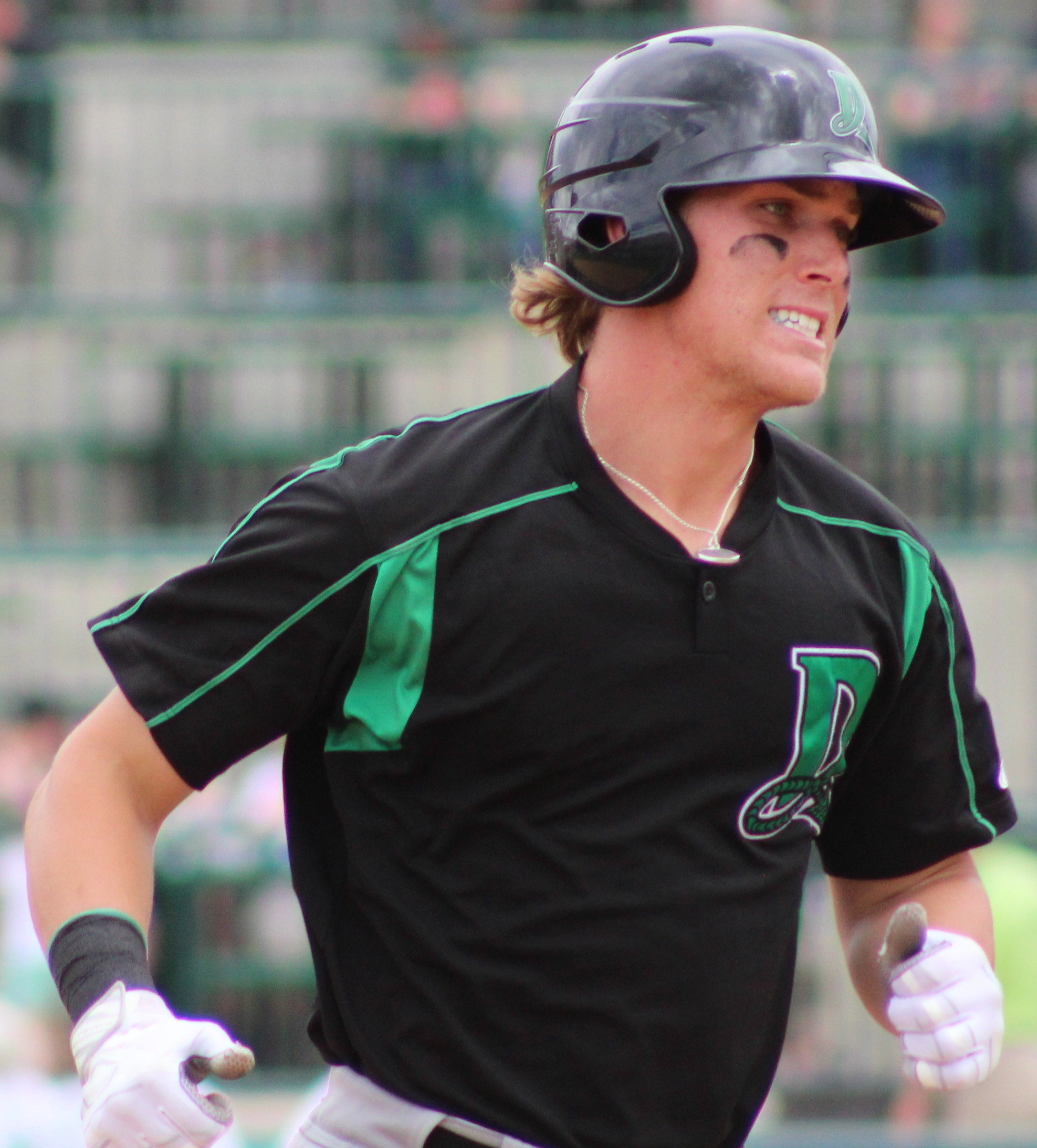
Stephenson with the Dayton Dragons in 2017

The Cincinnati Reds selected Stephenson in the first round, 11th overall, of the 2015 MLB draft. He had previously committed to play college baseball for Georgia Tech, but chose to forego that commitment in favor of signing with Cincinnati. After signing professionally, Stephenson was assigned to the Rookie-level Billings Mustangs of the Pioneer League. He played in 54 games for Billings, batting .268 with one home run and 16 RBI in 194 at bats. He began the 2016 season with the Dayton Dragons in the Low-A Midwest League, where he batted .196 in 25 games before going on the disabled list with a wrist sprain at the end of May. After completing a five-game rehabilitation assignment with the Arizona League Reds, Stephenson rejoined the Dragons on July 13. He finished the season batting .278 in 139 at bats, with three home runs and 16 RBI in 39 Midwest League games. During his Arizona League rehabilitation assignment, Stephenson met major league outfielder Jesse Winker, who was also recovering from a wrist injury, and his discussions with Winker informed his plate discipline. Stephenson went from 12 walks and 45 strikeouts in 2016 to 44 walks and 58 strikeouts in 2017.

Stephenson rejoined the Dragons for the 2017 Minor League Baseball season. He suffered a season-ending injury on July 14, when he injured a ligament in his thumb while sliding into a base. At the time of the injury, Stephenson had been batting .278 in 295 at bats, with six home runs and 50 RBI in 80 games. In the last 10 of those games, he batted .355 with 11 hits, seven runs scored, and three RBI in 31 at bats. Stephenson was promoted to the Class A-Advanced Daytona Tortugas of the Florida State League for the 2018 season. He remained fully healthy throughout the season but was uneven at the plate: Stephenson batted .351 through the first half of the minor league season but only .188 in August. He batted .250 for the season, with 11 home runs and 59 RBI in 388 at bats across 109 games, and was a Florida State League All-Star at the end of the season.

The Reds' farm system promoted Stephenson to the Double-A Chattanooga Lookouts of the Southern League for the 2019 minor league season. In 89 games and 312 at bats there, Stephenson batted .285 with six home runs and 44 RBI, finishing strong with a .360 average in the final month of the regular minor league season. In a survey of Southern League managers conducted by Baseball America, Stephenson was also named the league's best defensive catcher. After the season, the Reds sent Stephenson, who had platooned the catcher position with Chris Okey, to the Arizona Fall League to continue his development. He batted .347 in 13 games for the Glendale Desert Dogs, with seven doubles and three RBI, and received the Dernell Stenson Sportsmanship Award as the player who "best exemplifies unselfishness, hard work, and leadership" in the Arizona Fall League. That November, the Reds added Stephenson to their 40-man roster to protect him from the Rule 5 draft.

=== Cincinnati Reds (2020–present) ===
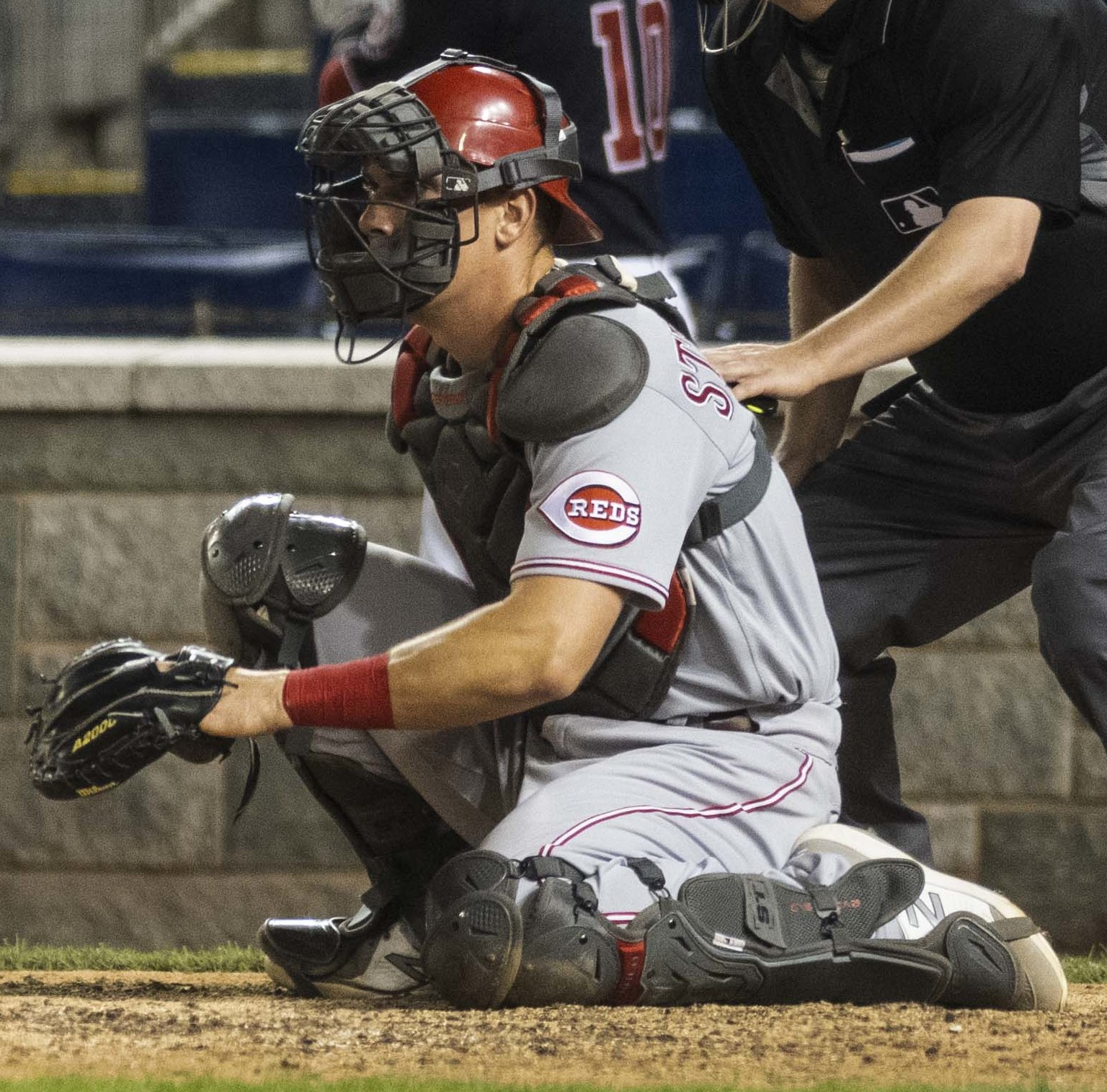
Stephenson with the Cincinnati Reds in 2021

Stephenson was slated to begin the 2020 season with the Triple-A Louisville Bats, but the changes to the 2020 MLB season caused by the COVID-19 pandemic meant that he was instead one of several prospects assigned to an alternate training site in Prasco Park, where he could be promoted in case of injury or illness to Tucker Barnhart or Curt Casali. The Reds sustained a number of injuries and illnesses at the beginning of their pandemic-abbreviated season, and Stephenson was promoted to make his MLB debut on July 26, 2020. Relieving Casali in the seventh inning, he hit a home run on the second pitch he saw, a 94 mph (151 km/h) fastball from Duane Underwood Jr. of the Chicago Cubs. It was the third time in franchise history that a Red had hit a home run in their first major league plate appearance, and the first time since Ted Tappe did so against the Brooklyn Dodgers on September 14, 1950. Pinch-hitting for leadoff hitter Shogo Akiyama in the first game of a doubleheader on September 14, Stephenson hit his first walk-off home run to win 3–1 against the Pittsburgh Pirates. Stephenson was used sparingly during the 2020 season, batting .294 with two home runs, four runs scored, and six RBI in eight games. He had hoped to join the Reds for the 2020 National League Wild Card Series against his hometown Atlanta Braves, but was ineligible to participate because he had been optioned off the major league roster too close to the end of the regular season. The Braves won the Wild Card, shutting out the Reds twice in the best-of-three series and eliminating them from the playoffs.

The offseason departure of Curt Casali allowed Stephenseon to appear on the Reds' 2021 Opening Day roster alongside Tucker Barnhart. Although he was slated to back up Barnhart, Reds manager David Bell hoped to afford Stephenson significant playing time throughout the season as well, telling reporters in April, "[Barnhart] is getting two out of three [starts] right now ... But there will be other times of the year where, dpeending on a certain situation, maybe that would be reversed." The left-handed Barnhart started more often against right-handed starting pitchers, while the right-handed Stephenson received more playing time against southpaw pitchers. Stephenson also spent time at first base in May after an injury to Joey Votto. Regular playing time in the middle of the batting order during Votto's injury seemed beneficial for Stephenson, who batted .316 over a seven-game span in Votto's absence, and Bell promised to find Stephenson opportunities to bat even in games he did not start that season. He was a successful pinch hitter when not catching, going 9-for-35 with two doubles, three home runs, and 12 RBI in pinch-hitting situations by September 10. The Reds fell short of postseason contention, finishing seven games behind the St. Louis Cardinals in the Wild Card race, but Stephenson had a strong rookie season, batting .286 with 10 home runs and 45 RBI. He additionally led all rookie catchers with a .797 on-base plus slugging (OPS) and was named to the MLB All-Rookie First Team. Stephenson received two third-place votes in balloting for NL Rookie of the Year, an award which was won by Cincinnati teammate Jonathan India.

The Reds traded Barnhart to the Detroit Tigers during the 2021–22 offseason, with general manager Nick Krall telling reporters that the move allowed Stephenson to become Cincinnati's everyday catcher in 2022. On April 19, Stephenson sustained a concussion when Luke Voit of the San Diego Padres collided with him at home plate: Voit was attempting to score on the play, while Stephenson was tagging him out. He returned two weeks later after clearing concussion protocols. Stephenson was injured again on June 10, fracturing his right thumb on a foul tip off the bat of Jordan Luplow during Cincinnati's game against the Arizona Diamondbacks. He was activated from the 10-day injured list on July 9 and returned to his role as everyday catcher. On July 22, Stephenson fractured his right clavicle on a foul tip off the bat of St. Louis Cardinals hitter Paul Goldschmidt. Stephenson required surgery to repair the fracture, which effectively ended his season.

To ease Stephenson back into playing, the Reds planned to have Stephenson catch 65 games in 2023, with Curt Casali and Luke Maile taking the rest of the workload. On days he did not catch, Stephenson would play first base or serve as Cincinnati's designated hitter. This plan was abandoned by the end of May, with manager David Bell telling reporters that learning first base was "a lot to handle" for a young player like Stephenson. Stephenson's 2023 season was a step back offensively: he batted .243 with 13 home runs over 142 games, and he saw a decrease in power from the past two years. He also struggled defensively, particularly with pitch framing, and young pitchers like Hunter Greene and Andrew Abbott preferred to work with Maile, which limited Stephenson's playing time towards the end of the season.

Stephenson showed an immediate power improvement in 2024, recording his first major league grand slam on April 20 against the Los Angeles Angels. He hit his career-high 14th home run of the season on August 6 against the Miami Marlins. In addition to his power, Stephenson increased his plate discipline, focusing on making hard contact, while also enhancing his framing as a catcher. Stephenson also put more time into studying opponents and personally working with the pitching staff, improving his rapport with his batterymates.

== Personal life ==
Stephenson married his wife Carlyn before the 2022 MLB season. They have one child together: a daughter born June 28, 2024.

== See also ==
- List of Major League Baseball players with a home run in their first major league at bat
