= Robert Dunning =

American hurdler (born 1997)

Personal information
- Nationality: USA
- Born: June 23, 1997 (age 29)
- Home town: Atlanta, Georgia
- Education: Kennesaw Mountain High School; South Plains College; University of Alabama

Sport
- Sport: Athletics
- Events: 110 metres hurdles 60 metres hurdles
- College team: South Plains College Texans; Alabama Crimson Tide

Achievements and titles
- National finals: 2021 NCAAs; • 110m hurdles, 1st (gold); 2022 USA Champs; • 110m hurdles, 6th; 2023 USA Indoors; • 60m hurdles, 2nd (silver); 2023 USA Champs; • 110m hurdles, 7th
- Personal bests: 100mH: 13.09 (+0.0) (2023); 60mH: 7.49A (2023)
- Updated on December 26, 2023

Robert Dunning (born June 23, 1997) is an American hurdler. He was the 2021 NCAA Division I Outdoor Track and Field Championships winner in the 110 metres hurdles.

== Biography ==
Dunning grew up in Atlanta, Georgia, where he attended Kennesaw Mountain High School and won Class 6A state titles in the 300 metres hurdles and high jump.

After high school graduation, Dunning competed on the South Plains College Texans track and field team, an NJCAA school. After winning NJCAA titles in the 110 metres hurdles and high jump, he transferred to the Alabama Crimson Tide track and field team.

His NCAA career was highlighted by his 2021 season, when he went undefeated in all 110 m hurdles races including a win at the 2021 NCAA Division I Outdoor Track and Field Championships. His performance was the first track and field title for Alabama men since 2014. His time of 13.25 seconds was also the fastest performance into a headwind in NCAA championship history.

In 2023, Dunning set his personal best of 13.09 seconds in the 110 m hurdles competing at the inaugural Adidas Atlanta City Games.

== Statistics ==
=== Personal bests ===
Event	Mark	Place	Competition	Venue	Date	Ref
110 metres hurdles	13.09 (+0.0 m/s)	2nd place, silver medalist(s)	Adidas Atlanta City Games	Atlanta, Georgia	May 6, 2023	
60 metres hurdles	7.49 A sh	2nd place, silver medalist(s)	USA Indoor Track and Field Championships	Albuquerque, New Mexico	February 18, 2023	
