= Sabana Grande de Palenque =

- Sabana Grande de Palenque in the Dominican Republic
- Coordinates: 18°16′12″N 70°09′00″W
- Country: Dominican Republic
- Province: San Cristóbal

Area
  - Total: 30.13 km^{2} (11.63 sq mi)

Population (2012)
  - Total: 30,247
  - Density: 1,004/km^{2} (2,600/sq mi)
- Municipal Districts: 0

Sabana Grande de Palenque is a municipality (municipio) of the San Cristóbal province in the Dominican Republic.

== History ==
It was elevated to the category of municipal district of the San Cristóbal municipality on January 1, 1945, and to the category of municipality in 1997 by the Dominican Congress.

== Geography ==
Palenque is located at the coast of the Caribbean Sea near San Cristóbal. It is divided into its seat (cabecera literally head) Sabana Grande de Palenque and two districts (Secciones): Sabana Palenque and Juan Barón. It has some of the most popular beaches among the region's locals, but is generally not considered one of the major tourist destinations of the country.

== Notable residents ==
- Édgar García, professional baseball player
- Timoniel Pérez, professional baseball player
- Jose Uribe, professional baseball player
- Juan Uribe, professional baseball player
- Francisco Liriano, professional baseball player
- Jairo Asencio, professional baseball player
- Iván Nova, professional baseball player
- Alex Reyes, professional baseball player
- Franmil Reyes, professional baseball player
- Framber Valdez, professional baseball player
- Oscar Gonzalez, professional baseball player
