= Katie Rinderle =

Elementary school teacher in Cobb County, Georgia

- Occupation: Public elementary school teacher
- Years active: 2013–2023
- Known for: First teacher fired under Georgia's House Bill 1084

Katie Rinderle is an American former elementary school teacher in Cobb County, Georgia. She is the first known public school teacher fired under Georgia's 2022 student protection laws for choosing a controversial book to read to the students of the gifted program of her school. The Protect the Students' Rights Act (or "divisive concepts" law), the Parents' Bill of Rights, and the Harmful to Minors Law. Particularly, the school district argues she violated the Divisive Concepts Law (House Bill 1084).

== Career ==
Rinderle taught for ten years and worked at Due West Elementary School in Cobb County, Georgia. In 2022, she took a new role as the school's gifted lead specialist for first through fifth grades. Rinderle was teaching at Midtown International School as administrator and manager of devices, until the school closed on April 3, 2026.

=== Termination ===
On 13 February 2023, Rinderle read the children's book My Shadow is Purple to her class after obtaining the book from the school's book fair. The book features a nonbinary character, and, according to Rinderle, it was voted to be read by her students. According to the Cobb County School Board, Rinderle read the book during a time block that was supposed to be dedicated to mathematics instruction and enrichment, but Rinderle denies this allegation. A mother of one of her fifth grade students, who is also a middle school teacher, complained to the principal and assistant principal of the school and to the area superintendent. She claimed that the material contained "inappropriate topics." Rinderle was called to the principal's office twice the next day, where she questioned why the book was available in the school’s recent Scholastic Book Fair if it was not deemed ‘appropriate'.

On 13 March 2023, Rinderle was put on paid administrative leave. The district held three recorded investigatory conferences with Rinderle, the director of employee relations, the principal, the lead investigator, and a representative from the Georgia Association of Educators, Rinderle's union.

Less than a month after reading the book, she was given the option to resign or be fired. She refused to resign and was terminated 6 June 2023. This was done with partial support from the investigative team, though the president of the Cobb County Association of Educators, Jeff Hubbard, said "The decision for termination ultimately rests with the superintendent of the school system...So, Superintendent [Chris] Ragsdale made the decision to terminate Ms. Rinderle’s contract.” Rinderle appealed her termination, and her case was heard before the Georgia Board of Education. The board voted to uphold her firing without debate.

=== Responses to termination ===
Rinderle's attorney Craig Goodmark stated, "Teachers are censoring themselves because they don't know what is and what isn't a divisive concept... Students are missing out on discussions because of that, and the classroom is going to be fundamentally altered because of the censorship rules."

The author of My Shadow is Purple, Scott Stuart, responded to the case, arguing that Rinderle's termination is an example of "how much more interested the school system in the US is in playing politics than they are in educating kids."

The president of the Cobb County Association of Educators, Jeff Hubbard, said of Rinderle's case that "It's very chilling in the fact that teachers now are having to watch what they say on anything because if one person gets offended and runs to the right people; that person can lose their career."

Cobb County Superior Court protected the decision in January 2025, and affirmed the decision in March of the same year. Rindele's education civil rights attorney filed Georgia Supreme Court, seeking review of the Court of Appeals’ decision in April of 2026. As of the same month, there was a stay on federal court proceedings concerning the same issue.
