= Georgia Association of Educators =

- Abbreviation: GAE
- Predecessor: Georgia Education Association
- Merged into: Georgia Teachers and Education Association
- Formation: May 9, 1970; 56 years ago
- Type: Professional association
- Legal status: 501(c)(6)
- Headquarters: Tucker, Georgia
- Fields: Education
- Members: approx. 30,000 (2018)
- President: Wayne Huston
- Vice President: Wendy Morgan
- Secretary-Treasurer: Latyshia Preston
- Executive Director: Dr. Craig Carter
- Website: gae.org

The Georgia Association of Educators is a union of public school educators in Georgia. It was established in 1970 when the Georgia Teachers and Education Association, which was black-only at the time (established in 1933 by Joseph Winthrop Holley), merged with the all-white Georgia Education Association. It is a state affiliate of the National Education Association. Its members include teachers, school administrators, and professionals working in other roles in Georgia public schools. As of 2018, the organization had about 30,000 members.

== Notable members ==
- Katie Rinderle - first teacher to be fired under Georgia's 2022 censorship laws.
