= Raleigh Webb =

American football player (born 1997)

Profile
- Position: Wide receiver

Personal information
- Born: December 28, 1997 (age 28); Acworth, Georgia, U.S.
- Listed height: 6 ft 2 in (1.88 m)
- Listed weight: 204 lb (93 kg)

Career information
- High school: Allatoona (Acworth, Georgia)
- College: The Citadel
- NFL draft: 2022: undrafted

Career history
- Baltimore Ravens (2022); New England Patriots (2022); Miami Dolphins (2023)*; Tampa Bay Buccaneers (2023–2024)*
- * Offseason or practice squad member only

Awards and highlights
- First-Team All-Southern Conference (2019)
- Stats at Pro Football Reference

Raleigh Webb (born December 28, 1997) is an American professional football wide receiver. He played college football at The Citadel.

== Early life ==
Webb grew up in Acworth, Georgia and attended Allatoona High School. As a senior, he made 117 tackles, 4.0 for loss, four interceptions, and two forced fumbles as Allatoona won the Georgia AAAAA state championship.

== College career ==
Webb redshirted his true freshman season at The Citadel and practiced as a defensive back. He was moved wide receiver prior to the start of his redshirt freshman season. Webb was named first team All-Southern Conference after catching 30 passes for 617 yards and 10 touchdowns as a redshirt sophomore. He caught 17 passes for 282 yards and four touchdowns in 12 games during his redshirt senior season, which was played both in the fall of 2020 and the spring of 2021 due to the COVID-19 pandemic.

Webb decided to utilize the extra year of eligibility granted to college athletes who played in the 2020 season due to the coronavirus pandemic and return to The Citadel for a sixth season. He finished his final season with 25 receptions for 536 yards and three touchdowns and also rushed for two touchdowns. Webb finished his collegiate career with 102 receptions for 2,151 receiving yards and 22 touchdowns. Webb also ran track at The Citadel.

== Professional career ==
Pre-draft measurables
Height	Weight	Arm length	Hand span	40-yard dash	10-yard split	20-yard split	20-yard shuttle	Three-cone drill	Vertical jump	Broad jump	Bench press
6 ft 1 3/4 in (1.87 m)	204 lb (93 kg)	32 1/4 in (0.82 m)	9 1/8 in (0.23 m)	4.58 s	1.56 s	2.64 s	4.23 s	7.25 s	39.5 in (1.00 m)	10 ft 3 in (3.12 m)	19 reps
All values from Pro Day

=== Baltimore Ravens ===
Webb signed with the Baltimore Ravens as an undrafted free agent on May 7, 2022. He was waived during final roster cuts on August 30, 2022, but was signed to the team's practice squad the next day. Webb was elevated to the active roster on September 18, 2022, for the team's Week 2 game against the Miami Dolphins and made his NFL debut in the game. Webb was elevated again for the Ravens' Week 3 game against the New England Patriots.

=== New England Patriots ===
The Patriots signed Webb to their active roster from the Ravens' practice squad on October 19, 2022. He was released on August 29, 2023.

=== Miami Dolphins ===
On August 31, 2023, the Dolphins signed Webb to their practice squad. He was released on November 13.

=== Tampa Bay Buccaneers ===
On November 22, 2023, Webb was signed to the Tampa Bay Buccaneers practice squad. He signed a reserve/future contract on January 23, 2024. He was waived on August 27.
