= Édgar García (baseball, born 1996) =

Dominican baseball player (born 1996)

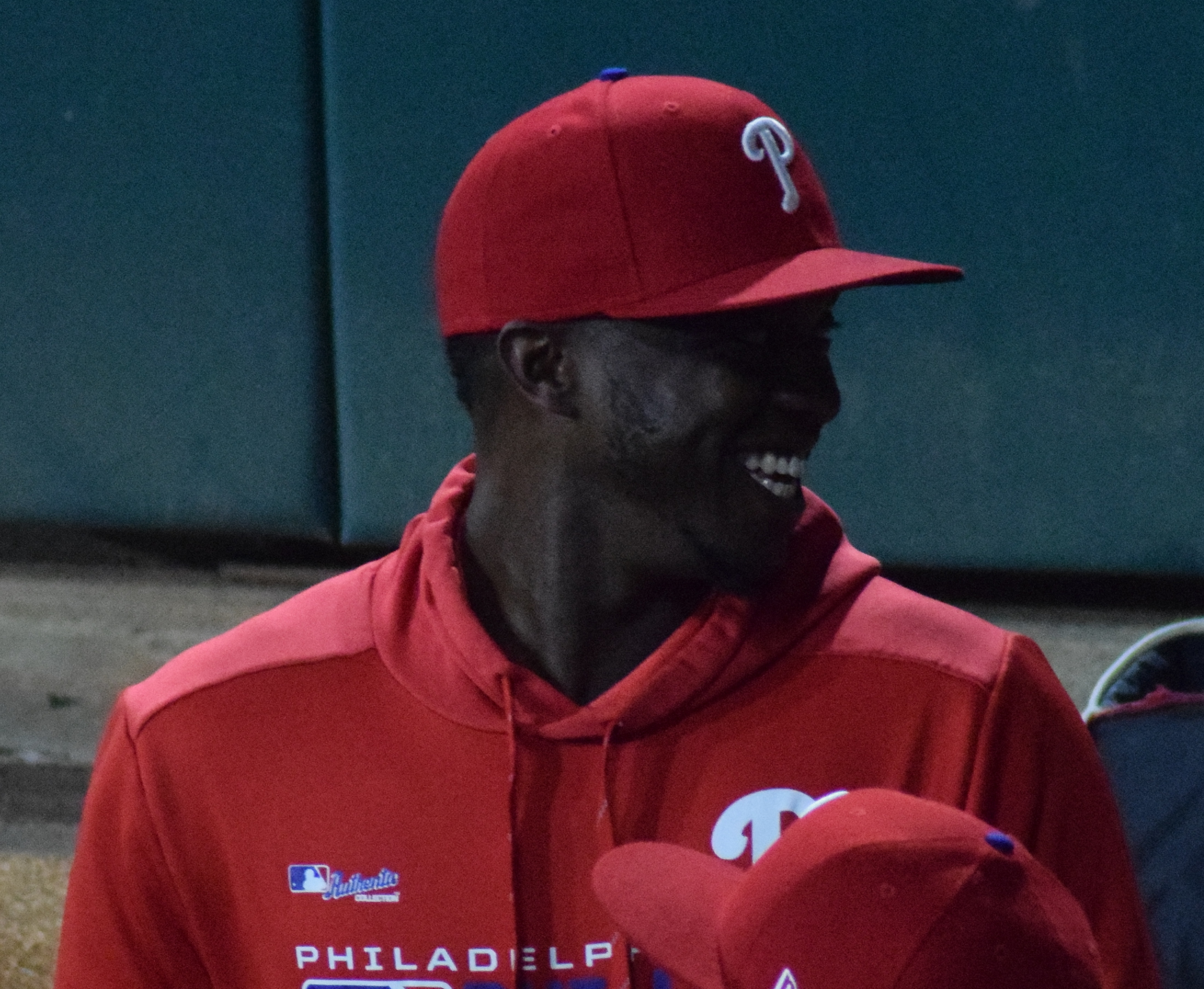
- García with the Phillies in 2019

Guelph Royals – No. 22
- Pitcher
- Born: October 4, 1996 (age 30); Sabana Grande de Palenque, Dominican Republic
- Bats: Right Throws: Right

MLB debut
- May 6, 2019, for the Philadelphia Phillies

MLB statistics (through 2021 season)
- Win–loss record: 2–1
- Earned run average: 7.74
- Strikeouts: 58
- Stats at Baseball Reference

Teams
- Philadelphia Phillies (2019); Tampa Bay Rays (2020); Cincinnati Reds (2021); Minnesota Twins (2021)

Édgar Ernesto García (born October 4, 1996) is a Dominican professional baseball pitcher for the Guelph Royals of the Canadian Baseball League (CBL). He has previously played in Major League Baseball (MLB) for the Philadelphia Phillies, Tampa Bay Rays, Cincinnati Reds, and Minnesota Twins.

== Professional career ==
=== Philadelphia Phillies ===
García was born in Sabana Grande de Palenque, Dominican Republic. He worked out as a shortstop for Phillies scouts initially in the Dominican Republic, but though his batting skills did not impress the scouts they liked his arm. He was signed as an international free agent as a pitcher by the Philadelphia Phillies on May 29, 2014, for $30,000.

García made his professional debut in 2014 with the Dominican Summer League Phillies, going 2–0 with a 2.10 ERA and 19 strikeouts in 25 2/3 innings. García played for the rookie-level Gulf Coast League Phillies in 2015, going 1–2 with a 3.31 ERA and 34 strikeouts in 32 2/3 innings pitched.

García played for the Single-A Lakewood BlueClaws in 2016, going 4–1 with a 2.80 ERA and 59 strikeouts over 61 innings of work. He played for the High-A Clearwater Threshers in 2017, going 3–4 with a 4.47 ERA and 89 strikeouts across 88 2/3 innings pitched.

==== 2018–2020 ====
In 2018, García split the season between the Double-A Reading Fightin Phils and Triple-A Lehigh Valley IronPigs; he was 7–2 with a 3.64 ERA and 72 strikeouts in 64 1/3 innings pitched. He was an Eastern League Mid-season All Star, was 4th in the league in appearances with 47, and among qualifying league relief pitchers he had the 4th-best opposing batting average, at .204, and the 5th-best SO/9.0 IP rate, at 10.26. He then pitched for the Estrellas Orientales of the Dominican Winter League during the 2018 offseason. The Phillies added García to their 40-man roster after the 2018 season, in order to protect him from the Rule 5 draft.

García opened the 2019 season back with Lehigh Valley, and before his promotion he was 1–1 with a 1.65 ERA and 23 strikeouts in 16 1/3 innings pitched. On May 6, 2019, he was promoted to the major leagues for the first time, and made his major league debut that night. In 2019 with Lehigh Valley, García was 2–1 with eight saves and a 2.48 ERA in 25 relief appearances across 29 innings pitched, in which he struck out 38 batters (11.8 strikeouts per 9 innings). In 2019 with the Phillies, he was 2–0 with a 5.77 ERA in 37 relief appearances, in which he tossed 39 innings and struck out 45 batters (10.4 strikeouts per 9 innings).

García was not immediately assigned to an affiliate to begin the 2020 season due to the cancellation of the minor league season because of the COVID-19 pandemic. García was designated for assignment by Philadelphia on August 13, 2020.

=== Tampa Bay Rays ===
On August 16, 2020, García was traded to the Tampa Bay Rays in exchange for Rodolfo Sanchez. He was called up by the Rays on August 23 after Nick Anderson was placed on the injured list. In four games with Tampa Bay, García struggled to a 10.80 ERA with one strikeout and one save over 3 1/3 innings pitched. On December 2, García was non-tendered by the Rays and became a free agent.

=== Cincinnati Reds ===
On December 23, 2020, García signed a one-year, $600,000 major-league contract with the Cincinnati Reds. On April 1, 2021, García was designated for assignment after Jonathan India was added to the 40-man roster. He was outrighted to the alternate training site on April 3, and was assigned to the Triple-A Louisville Bats to begin the year, where he pitched to a 3.38 ERA in 24 games. On July 19, García was selected to the active roster. In 5 appearances for the Reds, Garcia struggled to a 16.62 ERA with 4 strikeouts. On July 28, Garcia was designated for assignment by the Reds.

=== Minnesota Twins ===
On July 30, 2021, Garcia was claimed off of waivers by the Minnesota Twins. On August 31, the Twins outrighted Garcia off of their 40-man roster and sent him outright to the Triple-A St. Paul Saints. Garcia elected free agency on October 13.

On April 20, 2022, García signed with the Mariachis de Guadalajara of the Mexican League. However, he was released on April 27, without having made an appearance for the club.

=== Washington Nationals ===
On June 6, 2022, García signed a minor league contract with the Washington Nationals organization. García spent the remainder of the year with the Double-A Harrisburg Senators, posting an 0–2 record and 6.38 ERA with 15 strikeouts in 24 innings pitched. He elected free agency following the season on November 10.

=== Frederick Atlantic League Team ===
On March 10, 2023, García signed with the Frederick Atlantic League Team in the Atlantic League of Professional Baseball. He pitched in 7 games for Frederick, but struggled immensely to the tune of a 14.21 ERA with 4 strikeouts in 6 1/3 innings of work. On June 4, García was released by the team.

=== Fargo-Moorhead RedHawks ===
On July 7, 2023, García signed with the Fargo-Moorhead RedHawks of the American Association of Professional Baseball. In 13 games for the RedHawks, he recorded a 5.50 ERA with 16 strikeouts in 18 innings of work.

=== Lake Country DockHounds ===
On August 15, 2023, García was claimed off waivers by the Lake Country DockHounds of the American Association of Professional Baseball. In 8 appearances for Lake Country, García recorded a 5.59 ERA with 4 strikeouts across 9 2/3 innings pitched.

On February 14, 2024, García signed with the Charros de Jalisco of the Mexican League. However, prior to the season on April 5, García was released by Jalisco.

=== Acereros de Monclova ===
On May 5, 2024, García signed with the Acereros de Monclova of the Mexican League. In 12 appearances, he struggled to a 10.29 ERA, giving up 8 earned runs in just seven innings pitched. García was waived by Monclova on June 12.

=== Guelph Royals ===
On April 28, 2025, García signed with the Guelph Royals of the Intercounty Baseball League. He made 18 appearances for Guelph, compiling a 2-3 record and 2.83 ERA with 41 strikeouts and seven saves across 41 1/3 innings pitched.

On February 3, 2026, García re-signed with the Royals.

== Pitching style ==
García is known for an excellent 87 mph slider that has hard, downward action and generates more whiffs/swing compared to other pitchers' sliders.
