= Lucas Sims =

American baseball player (born 1994)

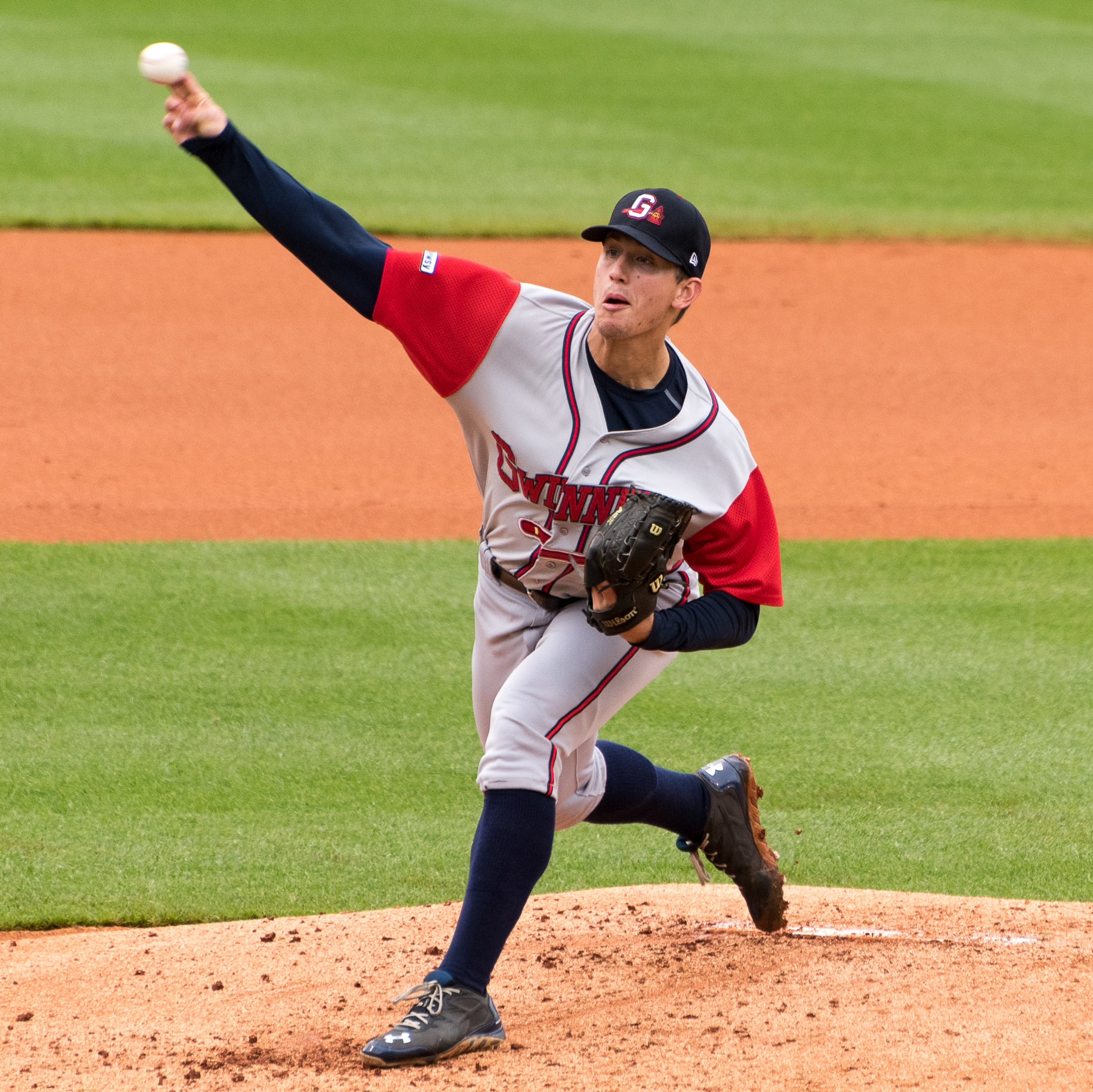
- Sims with the Gwinnett Braves in 2016

Staten Island FerryHawks
- Pitcher
- Born: May 10, 1994 (age 32); Lawrenceville, Georgia, U.S.
- Bats: Right Throws: Right

MLB debut
- August 1, 2017, for the Atlanta Braves

MLB statistics (through April 22, 2026)
- Win–loss record: 23–21
- Earned run average: 4.85
- Strikeouts: 376
- Stats at Baseball Reference

Teams
- Atlanta Braves (2017–2018); Cincinnati Reds (2018–2024); Boston Red Sox (2024); Washington Nationals (2025); Chicago White Sox (2026)

Lucas Sundberg Sims (born May 10, 1994) is an American professional baseball pitcher for the Staten Island FerryHawks of the Atlantic League of Professional Baseball. He has previously played in Major League Baseball (MLB) for the Atlanta Braves, Cincinnati Reds, Boston Red Sox, Washington Nationals, and Chicago White Sox. He made his MLB debut in 2017.

== Career ==
=== Atlanta Braves ===
Sims was drafted by the Atlanta Braves in the first round of the 2012 Major League Baseball draft, 21st overall, out of Brookwood High School in Snellville, Georgia. He signed with the Braves, receiving a $1.65 million signing bonus.

During his first professional season he pitched for the rookie level Gulf Coast League Braves and Danville Braves. He finished 2–4 with a 3.71 earned run average with 39 strikeouts in 34 innings pitched.

Sims played the 2013 season with the Single–A Rome Braves. He started the season in the bullpen but was then moved to the rotation. He finished the season 12–4 with a 2.62 ERA and 134 strikeouts in 116 2/3 innings. In 2013, Sims was considered the Braves best prospect according to MLB.com.

In 2014 he was 8–11 with a 4.20 ERA for the High–A Lynchburg Hillcats. He had fallen to third on the same list by the start of the 2015 season, and was placed seventh on the year-end list. Between three teams, he was 7–6 with a 4.37 ERA. The Braves sent Sims to the Arizona Fall League in 2015. He opened the AFL season for the Peoria Javelinas, and also started the Fall Stars Game.

Sims started 2016 as the Braves # 13 prospect according to Baseball America, and was invited to spring training for the first time. He began the season with the Mississippi Braves, and was promoted to Gwinnett on April 23. He struggled in the International League and returned to Mississippi on June 17. Sims finished 2016 with a 7–11 record and a 4.40 ERA; his 92 walks were the fourth-highest total in the minor leagues, and more than the total of any major leaguer. The Braves added him to their 40-man roster after the season.

Sims faced the Los Angeles Dodgers on August 1, 2017, in his major league debut. He pitched six innings, yielding three earned runs and recording three strikeouts. The debuts of Sims and Ozzie Albies marked the first time since 1968 that the Atlanta Braves started two players making their first major league appearance on the same day. He finished the season 3–6, with a 5.62 ERA. In December 2017, Braves manager Brian Snitker said that he might look at Max Fried, Sims, or another pitcher as the team's fifth starter in 2018. Sims spent time with the major league team in spring training, but began the 2018 season in Gwinnett.

=== Cincinnati Reds ===
On July 30, 2018, the Braves traded Sims, Matt Wisler, and Preston Tucker to the Cincinnati Reds in exchange for Adam Duvall. He made three appearances for Cincinnati in 2018, spending the majority of his time with the Triple-A Louisville Bats.

Sims started his first game as a Red on May 28, 2019, against the Pittsburgh Pirates. In 2019, he made 24 appearances for Cincinnati, posting a 2–1 record and 4.60 ERA with 57 strikeouts in 43 innings pitched. In 2020, Sims went 3–0 with a 2.45 ERA and 34 strikeouts in 25 2/3 innings over 20 games in relief. In 2021, he went 5–3 with a 4.40 ERA and 76 strikeouts in 47 innings.

Sims earned some notoriety for his actions during a home game against the Arizona Diamondbacks in April 2021. Despite heavy rain that would typically cause a rain delay, the umpires permitted the game to proceed. Sims couldn't get a proper grip on the wet ball, and finally forced the issue, asking home plate umpire Jerry Meals for a new baseball, and then another, and another, and another, saying each was too wet to use. Meals finally gave in and called a rain delay.

In 2022, Sims appeared in 9 games for the Reds, struggling to a 9.45 ERA with 5 strikeouts in 6 2/3 innings pitched. He was originally placed on the injured list with a back injury on May 12, 2022, then transferred to the 60-day injured list on June 17. On July 2, Sims underwent season-ending surgery to address a herniated disc in his back. He returned from the injury in April 2023. In 67 appearances out of the bullpen, Sims compiled a 7–3 record and 3.10 ERA with 72 strikeouts across 61 innings pitched.

Sims made 43 appearances for Cincinnati in the 2024 season before being traded to Boston, recording a 3.57 ERA with 40 strikeouts over 35 1/3 innings of work.

=== Boston Red Sox ===
On July 30, 2024, the Reds traded Sims to the Boston Red Sox, in exchange for minor league pitcher Ovis Portes. In 15 appearances for Boston, Sims struggled to an 0-2 record and 6.43 ERA with 9 strikeouts over 14 innings of work.

=== Washington Nationals ===
On February 19, 2025, Sims signed a one-year, $3 million contract with the Washington Nationals. In 18 appearances for Washington, he struggled to a 13.86 ERA with 13 strikeouts across 12 1/3 innings pitched. Sims was placed on release waivers by the Nationals on May 9.

=== Philadelphia Phillies ===
On May 20, 2025, Sims signed a minor league contract with the Philadelphia Phillies. He made 34 appearances for the Triple-A Lehigh Valley IronPigs, compiling a 4-1 record and 5.56 ERA with 36 strikeouts and one save over 34 innings of work. Sims elected free agency following the season on November 6.

=== Chicago White Sox ===
On January 30, 2026, Sims signed a minor league contract with the Chicago White Sox. He was released by the White Sox prior to the start of the regular season on March 20. Two days later, Sims re-signed with Chicago on a new minor league contract. On April 1, the White Sox selected Sims' contract, adding him to their active roster. He made nine appearances for Chicago, registering an 0-2 record and 4.50 ERA with 10 strikeouts over 10 innings of work. Sims was designated for assignment by Chicago on April 23; cleared waivers and elected free agency on April 25, but re-signed with the organization two days later on a minor league contract. He was released by Chicago again on July 19.

=== Staten Island FerryHawks ===
On July 29, 2026, Sims signed with the Staten Island FerryHawks of the Atlantic League of Professional Baseball.

== Personal ==
Sims and his wife, Dani, married in 2017.
