= Allatoona High School =

Public high school in Acworth, Georgia, United States

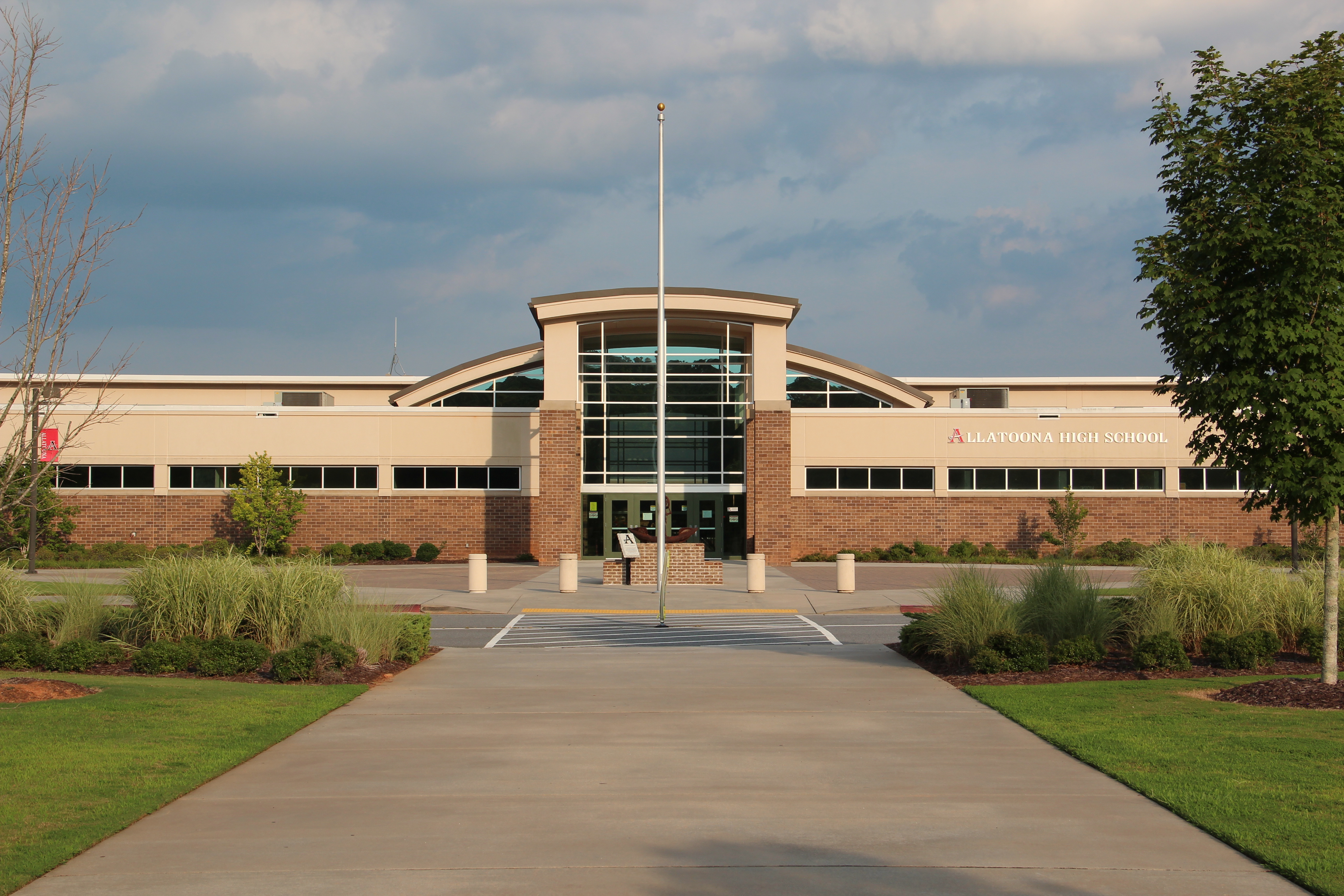

Location
- 3300 Dallas Acworth Highway NW; Acworth, Cobb County, Georgia 30101; United States; 34°02′07″N 84°44′07″W

Information
- School type: Public high school
- Established: August 2008; 18 years ago
- Status: Open; regular
- School board: Cobb County Board of Education
- School district: Cobb County School District
- NCES District ID: 1301290
- CEEB code: 110057
- NCES School ID: 130129003781
- Principal: Dr. Landon Odom
- Teaching staff: 93.20 (FTE)
- Grades: 9–12
- Gender: Mixed
- Enrollment: 1,642 (2023–2024)
- Student to teacher ratio: 17.62
- Schedule type: Block
- Schedule: 8:20 AM to 3:30 PM
- Campus type: Suburban
- Colors: Red and black
- Athletics: Yes
- Athletics conference: Georgia High School Association 6-AAAAAA
- Nickname: Buccaneers
- Rival: Harrison High School
- Accreditation: Southern Association of Colleges and Schools
- USNWR ranking: 44th in Georgia
- National ranking: 1,778th
- Feeder schools: Awtrey, Durham, and McClure Middle Schools
- Website: www.cobbk12.org/allatoona

Allatoona High School is one of eighteen public high schools in the Cobb County School District. The institution opened in the fall of 2008 and is currently the newest high school in the district. It is located in unincorporated Cobb County, with an Acworth post office address, north of Atlanta, in the United States. The school is named after the nearby Lake Allatoona.

== History ==
Allatoona High School opened in Fall 2008.

== Demographics ==
The demographic breakdown of the 1,785 students enrolled for the 2019–2020 school year was:

- Male - 49.92%
- Female - 50.08%
- Native American/Alaskan - 0.17%
- Asian/Pacific Islander - 3.92%
- Black - 18.6%
- Hispanic - 11.99%
- White - 61.68%
- Multiracial - 3.64%

In addition, 17.03% of the students qualified for free or reduced-cost lunches.

== Athletics ==
School athletics logo

Allatoona is a member of the Georgia High School Association and has won 8 Georgia state championships. Initially with a smaller enrollment which would have seen them in the AA competition classification, all Buccaneers teams except football started in the AAAA classification. For the 2010–11 season, GHSA reclassified Allatoona to AAA. Girls soccer won the school's first state championship for the AAA classification in May 2012 over Columbus High School and ended with a 20-2-1 record.

GHSA reclassified Allatoona again for the 2012–13 season, placing the Buccaneers into AAAAA. In April 2014, the riflery team won the Georgia state championship with a record-setting score. The Buccaneers saw their first multi-state championship year with two AAAAA titles the following year. Allatoona won the state one-act play championship with Wiley and the Hairyman, while the football team beat Glynn Academy at the Georgia Dome to cap a 14–1 season. The football program, highlighted by this season, was named as the 2010–2019 Team of the Decade by the Marietta Daily Journal.

2016 saw lacrosse win the program's first state championship in the A-AAAAA category with a 9–7 win over Westminster. Allatoona continued its ascent with GHSA's reclassification to 6A for the 2016–17 season. The Buccaneers responded with the school's first-ever back-to-back state championships with the boys track performances in 2017 and 2018. November 2019 marked the third 6A state championship when girls volleyball beat Sequoyah High School in five sets.

== Notable alumni ==
- Clarke Schmidt (2014), professional baseball player
- Raleigh Webb (2016), professional football player
