= Vladimir Gutiérrez =

Cuban baseball player (born 1995)

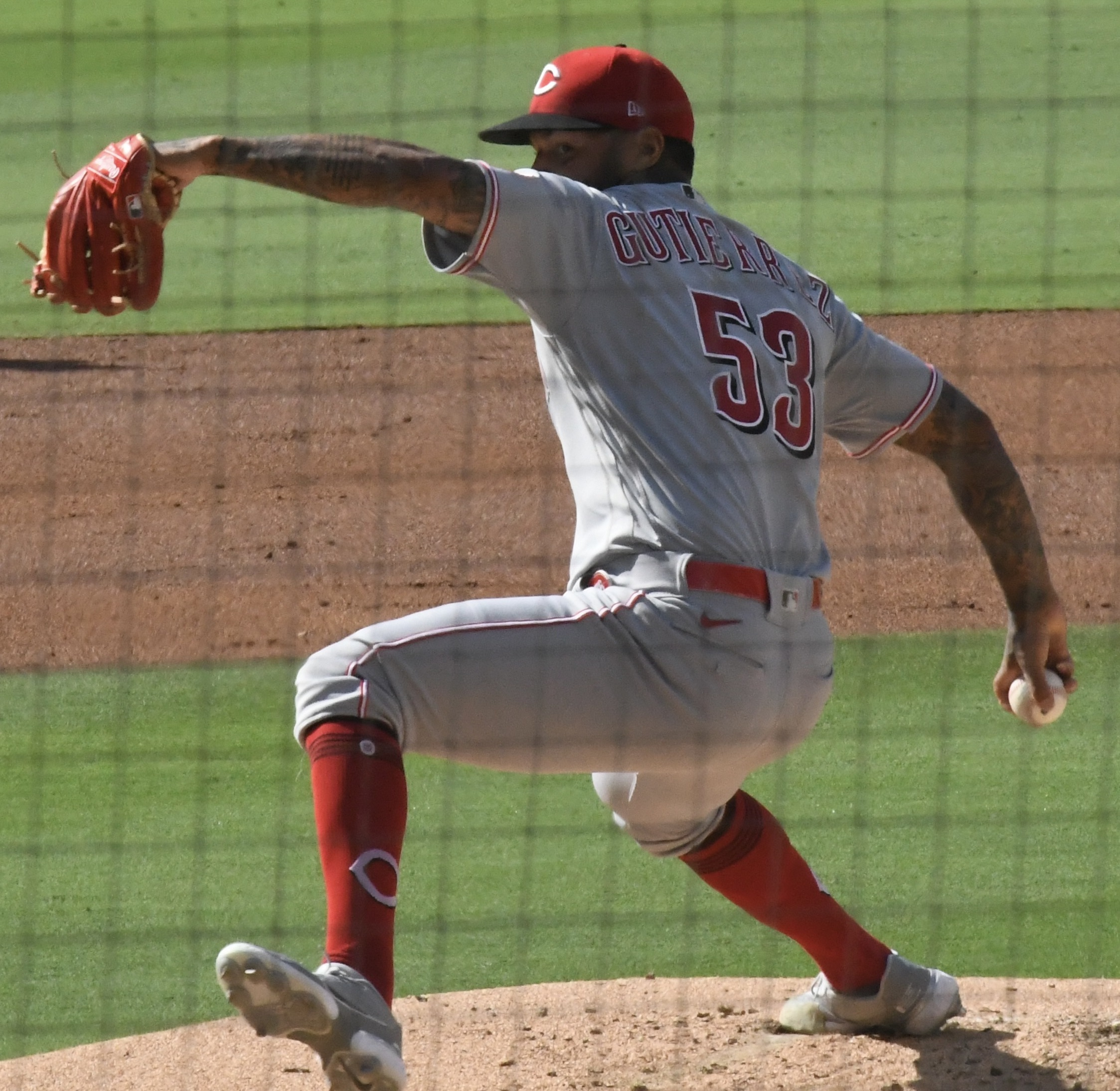
- Gutiérrez with the Cincinnati Reds in 2021

Pericos de Puebla – No. 53
- Pitcher
- Born: September 18, 1995 (age 30); Pinar del Rio, Cuba
- Bats: Right Throws: Right

MLB debut
- May 28, 2021, for the Cincinnati Reds

MLB statistics (through March 31, 2024)
- Win–loss record: 10–12
- Earned run average: 5.47
- Strikeouts: 121
- Stats at Baseball Reference

Teams
- Cincinnati Reds (2021–2022); Miami Marlins (2024)
Medals
Men's baseball
Representing Cuba
18U Baseball World Cup
Bronze medal – third place	2013 Taichung	Team

Vladimir Gutiérrez Rodríguez (born September 18, 1995) is a Cuban professional baseball pitcher for the Pericos de Puebla of the Mexican League. He has previously played in Major League Baseball (MLB) for the Cincinnati Reds and Miami Marlins.

== Career ==
=== Cuban career ===
Gutiérrez played for the Cuba national baseball team at the 2014 Central American and Caribbean Games. He played in the Cuban National Series for the Vegueros de Pinar del Río and was the Rookie of the Year for the 2013–2014 season. Gutierrez was selected to represent his country in an international tournament but left his Pinar del Rio team during the Caribbean Series in February 2015 in San Juan, Puerto Rico. He made his way to Mexico, where he eventually established residency in May. Major League Baseball declared him to be a free agent on July 7, 2015.

=== Cincinnati Reds ===
On August 30, 2016, Gutiérrez signed with the Cincinnati Reds for $4.75 million. He made his professional debut in 2017 for the Daytona Tortugas and spent the whole season there, going 7–8 with a 4.46 ERA in 19 starts. He pitched for the Pensacola Blue Wahoos in 2018 and the Louisville Bats in 2019.

On June 28, 2020, Gutiérrez was suspended 80 games for testing positive for a performance-enhancing substance. On November 20, 2020, Gutiérrez was added to the 40-man roster.

On April 25, 2021, Gutiérrez was activated off the restricted list and assigned to the alternate training site. On May 28, Gutiérrez was promoted to the major leagues for the first time to be the starting pitcher against the Chicago Cubs. In his debut, Gutiérrez took the loss after pitching 5.0 innings of 2-hit ball, one of the two hits being a solo home run from Cubs infielder David Bote. He also notched his first strikeout in the game, punching out Cubs catcher Willson Contreras. In his rookie campaign, Gutiérrez was 9–6 over 22 starts, posting a 4.74 ERA with 88 strikeouts in 114 innings. Gutiérrez received a single vote in National League Rookie of the Year voting, tying him for eighth place with David Bednar.

In 2022, Gutiérrez made 10 appearances (8 starts) for the Reds, struggling to a 1–6 record and 7.61 ERA with 29 strikeouts in 36.2 innings of work. In June, Gutiérrez suffered a first degree strain of his ulnar collateral ligament, and underwent Tommy John surgery on July 22. The procedure subsequently ended his 2022 season.

Gutiérrez began the 2023 season on the injured list as he continued to recover from Tommy John surgery. On July 28, 2023, he began a rehab assignment with the rookie–level Arizona Complex League Reds. In mid–August, Gutiérrez advanced his rehab to the Triple–A Louisville Bats. However, shortly after on August 17, he was pulled off of rehab assignment, and did not appear for Cincinnati during the year. On October 9, Gutiérrez was removed from the 40–man roster and sent outright to Triple–A Louisville. He elected free agency on October 26.

=== Miami Marlins ===
On February 22, 2024, Gutiérrez signed a minor league contract with the Miami Marlins. On March 31, his contract was selected to the active roster. He pitched in that day's game against the Pittsburgh Pirates, allowing three runs on three hits and four strikeouts in four innings pitched. The next day, Gutiérrez was designated for assignment by Miami.

=== Milwaukee Brewers ===
On April 5, 2024, Gutiérrez was claimed off waivers by the Milwaukee Brewers. He made two appearances for the Triple–A Nashville Sounds, struggling to a 13.50 ERA across 4 2/3 innings. On April 17, Gutiérrez was designated for assignment by Milwaukee.

=== Boston Red Sox ===
On April 18, 2024, Gutiérrez was traded to the Boston Red Sox in exchange for cash considerations. He made three appearances for the Triple–A Worcester Red Sox before he was designated for assignment by Boston on May 1. Gutiérrez cleared waivers and was sent outright to Worcester on May 6. In five appearances for Worcester, he struggled to a 9.00 ERA with eight strikeouts across eight innings. On May 26, Gutiérrez was released by the Red Sox organization.

=== Pericos de Puebla ===
On June 8, 2024, Gutiérrez signed with the Pericos de Puebla of the Mexican League. In 8 starts for Puebla, he posted a 4–2 record and 5.40 ERA with 39 strikeouts over 40 innings of work.

Gutiérrez made 17 appearances (including 16 starts) for Puebla during the 2025 season, compiling a 5–3 record and 5.03 ERA with 66 strikeouts across 87 2/3 innings pitched.
