= Ryan Hendrix =

American baseball player (born 1994)

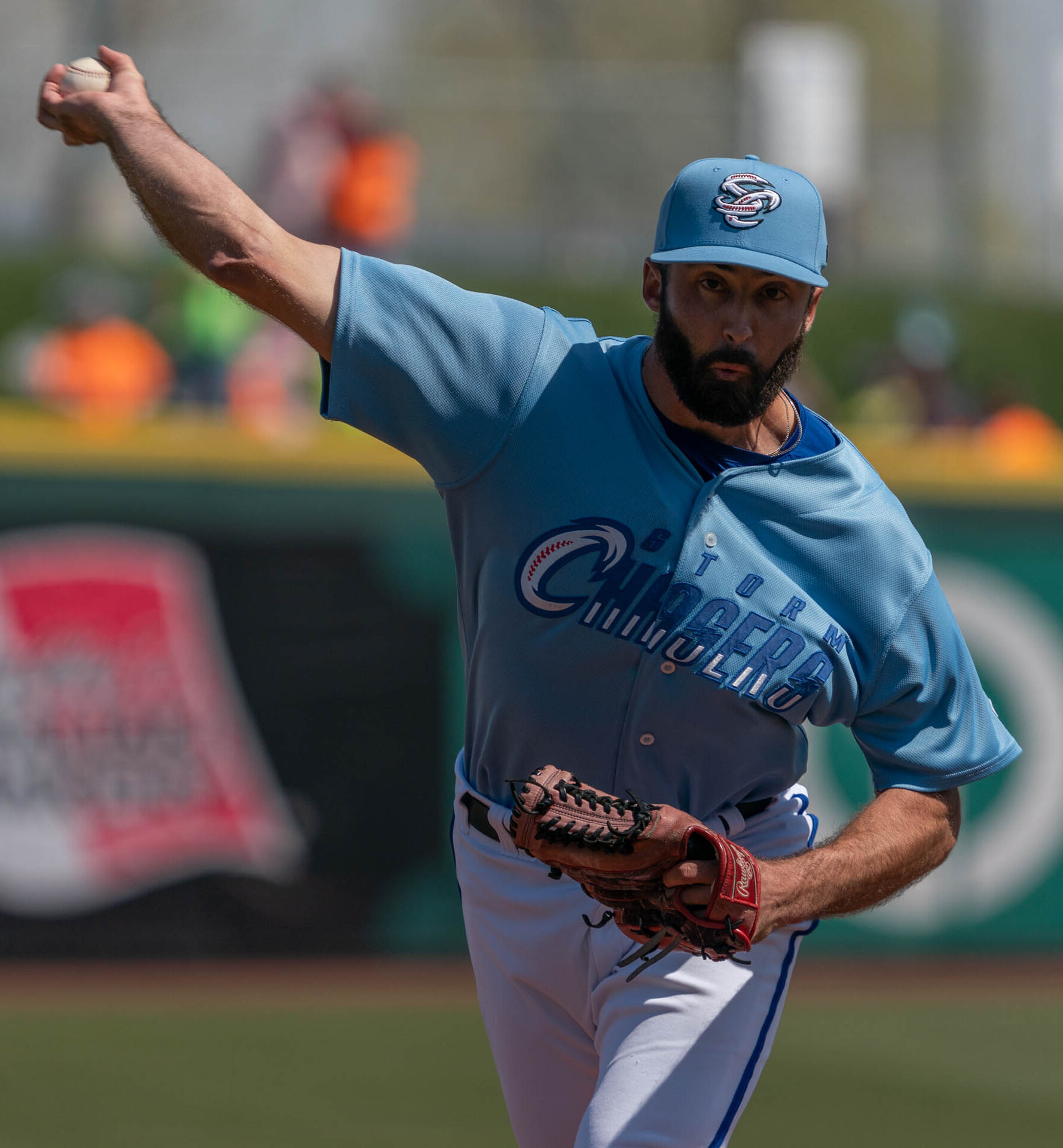
- Hendrix with the Omaha Storm Chasers in 2025

Algodoneros de Unión Laguna – No. 68
- Pitcher
- Born: December 16, 1994 (age 31); Lufkin, Texas, U.S.
- Bats: Right Throws: Right

MLB debut
- April 23, 2021, for the Cincinnati Reds

MLB statistics (through 2022 season)
- Win–loss record: 5–1
- Earned run average: 5.85
- Strikeouts: 44
- Stats at Baseball Reference

Teams
- Cincinnati Reds (2021–2022)

Ryan Matthew Hendrix (born December 16, 1994) is an American professional baseball pitcher for the Algodoneros de Unión Laguna of the Mexican League. He has previously played in Major League Baseball (MLB) for the Cincinnati Reds.

== Amateur career ==
Hendrix attended Cypress Woods High School in Cypress, Texas. He was drafted by the Cleveland Indians in the 17th round of the 2013 MLB draft, but did not sign and attended Texas A&M University. In 2015, Hendrix played for the United States collegiate national team. Against Cuba, Hendrix, Tanner Houck, and A. J. Puk combined to throw a no-hitter. Hendrix was drafted by the Cincinnati Reds in the 5th round, with the 138th overall selection, of the 2016 MLB draft, and signed with them.

== Professional career ==
=== Cincinnati Reds ===
Hendrix split his professional debut season of 2016 between the Billings Mustangs and the Dayton Dragons, going a combined 3–1 with a 3.57 ERA and 36 strikeouts over 35 1/3 innings. He split the 2017 season between Dayton and the Daytona Tortugas, going a combined 5–5 with a 2.90 ERA and 88 strikeouts over 62 innings. He spent the 2018 season with Daytona, going 4–4 with a 1.76 ERA and 79 strikeouts over 51 innings. He split the 2019 season between the Arizona League Reds and the Chattanooga Lookouts, going a combined 4–0 with a 1.85 ERA and 31 strikeouts over 24 1/3 innings.

On November 20, 2019, the Reds added Hendrix to their 40-man roster to protect him from the Rule 5 draft. He did not play a minor league game in 2020 due to the cancellation of the minor league season because of the COVID-19 pandemic.

On April 23, 2021, Hendrix was promoted to the major leagues for the first time. He made his MLB debut that day, pitching a shutout inning of relief against the St. Louis Cardinals. In the game, he also recorded his first two major league strikeouts, punching out Justin Williams and Tommy Edman.

On April 24, 2022, Hendrix was designated for assignment by the Reds. He cleared waivers and was sent outright to Triple-A Louisville on April 29. He had his contract selected back to the major league roster on July 16, and was returned to the minors on July 19. He again had his contract selected on July 30. In 9 total games for Cincinnati, Hendrix recorded a 5.40 ERA with 9 strikeouts in 8 1/3 innings pitched. On October 15, Hendrix was removed from the 40-man roster and sent outright to Triple–A Louisville. On October 20, Hendrix elected to become a free agent.

=== Arizona Diamondbacks ===
On December 9, 2022, Hendrix signed a minor league contract with the Arizona Diamondbacks. He made only three appearances for the Triple–A Reno Aces, posting a 3.00 ERA with 2 strikeouts in 3.0 innings of work. On August 30, 2023, Hendrix was released by the Diamondbacks organization.

=== Kansas City Royals ===
On February 8, 2025, Hendrix signed a minor league contract with the Kansas City Royals. He made 34 appearances split between the Double-A Northwest Arkansas Naturals and Triple-A Omaha Storm Chasers, accumulating a 5-4 record and 7.84 ERA with 60 strikeouts across 41 1/3 innings pitched. Hendrix elected free agency following the season on November 6.

=== Tecolotes de los Dos Laredos ===
On January 22, 2026, Hendrix signed with the Tecolotes de los Dos Laredos of the Mexican League. In 35 relief appearances for the team, he posted a 2–6 record with a 3.32 ERA and 41 strikeouts across 38 innings pitched.

=== Algodoneros de Unión Laguna ===
On July 16, 2026, Hendrix, Roenis Elías, and Brandon Brennan were traded to the Algodoneros de Unión Laguna of the Mexican League.
