= Eric Jagers =

American baseball player and coach

New York Mets
- Pitcher / Coach
- Born: May 28, 1995 (age 30); Bettendorf, Iowa
- Bats: Right Throws: Left

Teams
- As coach: Cincinnati Reds (2021–2022)

Eric Jagers (born May 28, 1995) is an American professional baseball coach and former pitcher who is currently the director of pitching development for the New York Mets of Major League Baseball (MLB). He was the assistant pitching coach for the Cincinnati Reds from 2021 to 2022.

== Career ==
Jagers attended and played baseball at Des Moines Area Community College before earning a roster spot on University of Iowa baseball team. However, he did not play for Iowa as he retired due to developing thoracic outlet syndrome and instead opted to work at Driveline Baseball in Seattle, where he had previously trained and developed his pitching abilities that helped earn him a roster spot at Iowa. While there, he played a critical role in the discovery of the Seam-shifted wake phenomenon. He left Driveline to be a pitching strategist for the Philadelphia Phillies in 2019 before joining the Cincinnati Reds organization before the start of the 2020 season as their minor league pitching coordinator. He was promoted to assistant pitching coach in 2021 after Caleb Cotham left to be the Phillies' pitching coach.

Jagers was hired by the New York Mets as their director of pitching development prior to the start of the 2023 season.
