= Nick Krall =

American baseball executive

Cincinnati Reds
- President Of Baseball Operations
- Born: November 18, 1977 (age 48); York, Pennsylvania, U.S.

Nicholas Krall (born November 18, 1977) is an American baseball executive. He is the president of baseball operations for the Cincinnati Reds of Major League Baseball (MLB).

Krall is from York, Pennsylvania. He attended York Catholic High School, graduating in 1995, and Louisiana State University (LSU), where he unsuccessfully attempted to walk on to the LSU Tigers baseball team in 1999. After graduating, he worked in an internship for the New Jersey Cardinals of the New York-Penn League, and then joined the Oakland Athletics in 2001, working in the baseball operations department. He joined the Reds in 2003 as an advance scout. He became assistant director of baseball operations in 2008, and was promoted to senior director of baseball operations in 2014 and to assistant general manager in 2015. Krall was promoted to general manager on May 10, 2018. On October 19, 2020, Krall was named head of baseball operations for the Reds following the departure of Dick Williams. On September 29, 2023, Krall was promoted to president of baseball operations.

== Record as baseball executive ==
Team	Year	Regular season					Postseason			
Team	Year	Games	Won	Lost	Win %	Finish	Won	Lost	Win %	Result
CIN	2021	162	83	79	.512	3rd in NL Central	–	–	–	
CIN	2022	162	62	100	.383	4th in NL Central	–	–	–	
CIN	2023	162	82	80	.506	3rd in NL Central	–	–	–	
CIN	2024	162	77	85	.475	4th in NL Central	–	–	–	
CIN	2025	162	83	79	.512	3rd in NL Central	0	2	.000	Lost NLWC (LAD）
CIN	2026	162	75	87	.463	5th in NL Central	–	–	–	
Total		972	462	510	.475		0	2	.000	
