= Cobb County School District =

School district in Marietta, Georgia, United States

Address
- 514 Glover Street SE Marietta, Georgia, 30060-2750; United States
- Coordinates: 33°56′19″N 84°32′16″W

District information
- Motto: "One Team, One Goal, Student Success"
- Grades: Pre-kindergarten – 12
- Superintendent: Chris Ragsdale
- Accreditations: Southern Association of Colleges and Schools; Georgia Accrediting Commission
- Schools: 110
- Budget: US$1.8 billion (2024–25)
- NCES District ID: 1301290

Students and staff
- Students: 106,970 Minority Enrollment 70% 34% White 30% Black 24% Latino/Hispanic 5.8% Asian 4.8% 2 or more ethnicities
- Teachers: 7,408.10 (FTE) (2022–23)
- Staff: 6,187.60 (FTE) (2022–23)
- Student–teacher ratio: 14.40 (2022–23)

Other information
- Website: cobbk12.org

The Cobb County School District (CCSD) is the school district which operates public schools in Cobb County, Georgia, United States. The school district includes all of Cobb County except for the Marietta city limits, which are covered by the Marietta City Schools school district, though a number of schools in unincorporated parts of the county have Marietta postal addresses. It is the second-largest school system in Georgia (behind only Gwinnett County Public Schools) and 23rd largest in the United States. The district is the county's largest employer and one of the largest in the US (at least in school systems). All Cobb County schools are accredited by Cognia (education), and the district is among the first to have earned district-wide accreditation. The superintendent of the school district is Chris Ragsdale.

== Board of education ==
As a body created under provisions of the Georgia's constitution, the Cobb County Board of Education has full authority to control and manage the public schools within the county, excluding any independent school system. This means that like other school systems in the state, it is directly under the Georgia Department of Education and not subject to city or county government control. This also means that it has separate funding through its own property tax (except on senior citizens) outside of Marietta city limits, and 1% county-wide sales tax which it splits with Marietta City Schools based on which jurisdiction it was collected in.

As of August 2024, the elected board members of the Cobb County Board of Education of the Cobb County School District are:

- Randy Scamihorn (Post 1, Chair)
- Becky Sayler (Post 2)
- Leroy Tre' Hutchins (Post 3)
- David Chastain (Post 4)
- David Banks (Post 5)
- Nichelle Davis (Post 6)
- Brad Wheeler (Post 7, Vice Chair)

The board gave management of fiscal year 2025 general-fund operating budget of approximately $1.8 billion to Superintendent Ragsdale for most transactions under $200,000.

== Controversies ==
In recent years, the Superintendent has been granted authority to manage most of the district outside of the board's purview or approval.

On August 16, 2024, Ragsdale banned 13 more books.

On July 19, 2024, Ragsdale revealed a list of books banned since August 2023. It was also reported that he lashed out at The Marietta Daily-Journal for publishing information about his bans. The list focuses heavily on race, LGTBQIA+ topics and authors, and other topics Ragsdale deems "divisive" based on his interpretation of HB 1084 and SB 226.

June 14, 2024 students and alumni announce joining the federal discrimination lawsuit against Cobb County School District, et al.

On May 14, 2024, the National Women's Law Center (NWLC) filed two complaints against the Cobb County School District for violations of Title IX of the Education Amendments of 1972 and Title VI of the Civil Rights Act of 1964. Ragsdale has previously responded that his bans are simply removals to protect children.

On February 13, 2024, Katie Rinderle and other educators file a lawsuit against the Cobb County School District for discrimination.

== Schools ==
=== Elementary schools ===
- Acworth Elementary School
- Addison Elementary School
- Argyle Elementary School
- Austell Elementary School
- Baker Elementary School
- Bells Ferry Elementary School
- Belmont Hills Elementary School
- Big Shanty Elementary School
- Birney Elementary School
- Blackwell Elementary School
- Brumby Elementary School
- Bryant Elementary School
- Bullard Elementary School
- Chalker Elementary School
- Cheatham Hill Elementary School
- City View Elementary School
- Clarkdale Elementary School
- Clay-Harmony Leland Elementary School
- Compton Elementary School
- Davis Elementary School
- Dowell Elementary School
- Due West Elementary School
- East Side Elementary School
- Eastvalley Elementary School
- Fair Oaks Elementary School
- Ford Elementary School
- Frey Elementary School
- Garrison Mill Elementary School
- Green Acres Elementary School
- Hayes Elementary School
- Hendricks Elementary School
- Hollydale Elementary School
- Keheley Elementary School
- Kemp Elementary School
- Kennesaw Elementary School
- Kincaid Elementary School
- King Springs Elementary School
- LaBelle Elementary School
- Lewis Elementary School
- Mableton Elementary School
- McCall Primary School
- Milford Elementary School
- Mount Bethel Elementary School
- Mountain View Elementary School
- Murdock Elementary School
- Nicholson Elementary School
- Nickajack Elementary School
- Norton Park Elementary School
- Pickett's Mill Elementary School
- Pitner Elementary School
- Powder Springs Elementary School
- Powers Ferry Elementary School
- Riverside Elementary School
- Rocky Mount Elementary School
- Russell Elementary School
- Sanders Elementary School
- Sedalia Park Elementary School
- Shallowford Falls Elementary School
- Smyrna Elementary School
- Sope Creek Elementary School
- South Cobb Early Learning Center
- Still Elementary School
- Teasley Elementary School
- Timber Ridge Elementary School
- Tritt Elementary School
- Varner Elementary School
- Vaughan Elementary School

=== Middle schools ===
- Awtrey Middle School
- Barber Middle School
- Campbell Middle School
- Cooper Middle School
- Daniell Middle School
- Dickerson Middle School
- Dodgen Middle School
- Durham Middle School
- East Cobb Middle School
- Floyd Middle School
- Garrett Middle School
- Griffin Middle School
- Hightower Trail Middle School
- Lindley Middle School
- Betty Gray Middle School
- Lost Mountain Middle School
- Lovinggood Middle School
- Mabry Middle School
- McCleskey Middle School
- McClure Middle School
- Palmer Middle School
- Pearson Middle School
- Pine Mountain Middle School
- Simpson Middle School
- Smitha Middle School
- Tapp Middle School

=== High schools ===
The district administers these 17 high schools:

- Allatoona High School
- Campbell High School
  - Campbell High School International Baccalaureate Program
  - Campbell High Freshman Academy
- Harrison High School
- Hillgrove High School
- Kell High School
  - Chick Fil’A Leadership Academy
- Kennesaw Mountain High School
  - Kennesaw Mountain High School Academy of Mathematics, Science, and Technology
  - Transition Academy
- Lassiter High School
- McEachern High School
- North Cobb High School
  - North Cobb School for International Studies
  - North Cobb High School Freshman Academy
- Osborne High School
  - Transition Academy
  - 3DE School
  - Cobb Innovation and Technology Academy
- Pebblebrook High School
  - STEAM Academy
  - Pebblebrook High School Center for Excellence in the Performing Arts
- Pope High School
  - Transition Academy
- South Cobb High School
  - South Cobb High School Academy of Research and Medical Sciences
- Sprayberry High School
  - Science, Technology, Engineering & Math Academy
  - Transition Academy
  - International Spanish Academy
- Walton High School
  - International Spanish Academy
  - STEM Leadership Academy
- Wheeler High School
  - Wheeler HS Center for Advanced Studies in Science, Mathematics, & Technology

=== Special needs schools and other programs ===
- Adult Education Center
  - Cobb
- Deveraux Ackerman Academy
- Learning Everywhere
  - Cobb Virtual Academy
  - Cobb Horizon High School
    - Cobb Online Learning Academy at CHHS
- ASPIRE
  - ASPIRE Program
  - ASPIREAcademy at Sky View
  - Douglas County ASPIRE
- Pre-K
- Sports News
- Food and Nutrition Services
- Preschool
- ESOL
- Cobb Mentoring Matters
- Homeless Education Program
- Intensive English Program
- International Welcome Center
- South Cobb Early Learning Center
- Magnet Programs
- Ombudsman
- Title 1

=== Charter schools ===
- Walton High School
- Power Public Schools

=== Former school and program list ===
- E-High School
- Osborne Freshman Academy
- Harrison Freshman Academy
- West Cobb High School
- Elementary Virtual Program
- Skyview Elementary School
- Headstart
- Wills High School
- Corporate Classroom
- Kennesaw School of Mathematics and Science
- International Academy of Mableton
- International Academy of Smyrna
- Kennesaw Charter School
- International Schools of North Georgia Inc.
- Big Shanty Intermediate School
- Robert L. Osborne School
- Lindley 6th Grade Academy
- Smyrna High School
- Clay Elementary School
- HAVEN Academy
- HAVEN Program
- HAVEN Academy at Sky View
- Marietta HAVEN Academy
- Douglas HAVEN Academy
- Paulding Adult Education Center
- Harmony Leland Elementary School
- Fitzhugh Lee High School
- Fitzhugh Lee Elementary
- Acworth High School
- Acworth Elementary School
- Brown Elementary School
- Riverside Intermediate School
- Teasley Intermediate School
- Olive Springs Consolidated School
- Olive Springs Community School
- International Welcome Center 2
- Hawthorne HAVEN School
- Fitzhugh Lee HAVEN School
- Success For All Students
- Oakwood Open Campus High School
- Central Alternative
- Transitional Learning Center
- Oakwood Digital Academy
- Performance Learning Center
- Cobb Night School
- Elizabeth Elementary School

=== Happenings ===
The original Clarkdale Elementary School was a Cobb County school that opened in the 1960s and closed on September 21, 2009, due to the massive flooding in Georgia that day, which submerged the school to the ceiling in the waters of nearby Noses Creek. Despite being built outside the 100-year flood plain, water rose ankle-deep on the grounds as the children were being evacuated.

The school housed about 450 students. For three school years, these students attended Compton Elementary (K-2) and Austell Intermediate (3–5). The new Clarkdale Elementary opened in mid-August 2012 near Cooper Middle School (although the Federal Emergency Management Agency declared the original site acceptable), while the previous building awaited demolition, a delay which the local neighborhood complained about.

State funding (a bond for 20% of the cost of replacement) was vetoed by Governor Sonny Perdue on procedural grounds in early June 2010. Most of the remainder will be covered by insurance and leftover SPLOST funds.

At least one other school has been demolished. The original Blackwell Elementary School in the Blackwells community was built in the 1920s on Canton Road (old Georgia 5), as the county's first consolidated school. The historic schoolhouse, and all of its later additions, were destroyed in summer 1997 and closed for a year while a new replacement was built on the same site, in an institutional style much like the plain architecture of an office park rather than a historic school.

The original Mountain View Elementary was rebuilt farther down Sandy Plains Road; the original was demolished in 2018 for a new shopping center. Also located in a busy business district, Brumby Elementary on Powers Ferry Road was set to be replaced by a mixed-use development in 2020 with a Kroger superstore by 2022. Both Brumby and East Cobb Middle School opened new schools next to each other on Terrell Mill Road in August 2018, although local residents objected to the expected traffic and noise. The old East Cobb Middle School, located directly across Holt Road from Wheeler HS, will be home to a relocated Eastvalley Elementary School.

Walton High School made a run to the GHSA State Championship for American football in 2023, looking to bring home their first-ever state championship, but would ultimately fall to Milton High School heartbreakingly after conceding a field goal with a minute left in the game, going down 24-21, and returning the subsequent kickoff to Milton's 28 yard line, only to throw a pick six on the very next play, and the game would end 31-21 in Milton's favor.

== Events ==
=== Selman v. Cobb County School District ===
In 2002, Cobb County School District voted to put stickers on textbooks with a message including the admonition cautioning students that "evolution is only a theory." Plaintiffs brought suit on separation of church and state grounds, with the initial trial finding for the plaintiffs. Cobb County School District appealed and the verdict was overturned and remanded for a new trial, at which time plaintiffs and Cobb County School District reached an out-of-court settlement, with the district agreeing to remove the stickers.

=== Teacher's sexual contact with student ===
A Cobb County teacher was discovered to have had sex with a 17-year-old student. When brought to trial, the teacher pleaded that the student had consented. This defense was allowed by the Superior Court judge and upheld by the Georgia Supreme Court in 2009. This led the Georgia legislature to pass a statute in 2010 making it a crime for a teacher to have sexual relations with a student.

== School Board Election 2024 ==
As of August 2024, these board posts are up for general election in 2024:

- Post 1 Dr. Vickie Benson(D) challenging incumbent Randy Scamihorn(R)
- Post 3 Leroy Tre' Hutchins(D) unchallenged incumbent
- Post 5 Laura Judge(D) running against John H. Cristadoro(R)
- Post 7 Andrew Cole(D) challenging incumbent Brad Wheeler(R)
