= Tucker Barnhart =

American baseball player (born 1991)

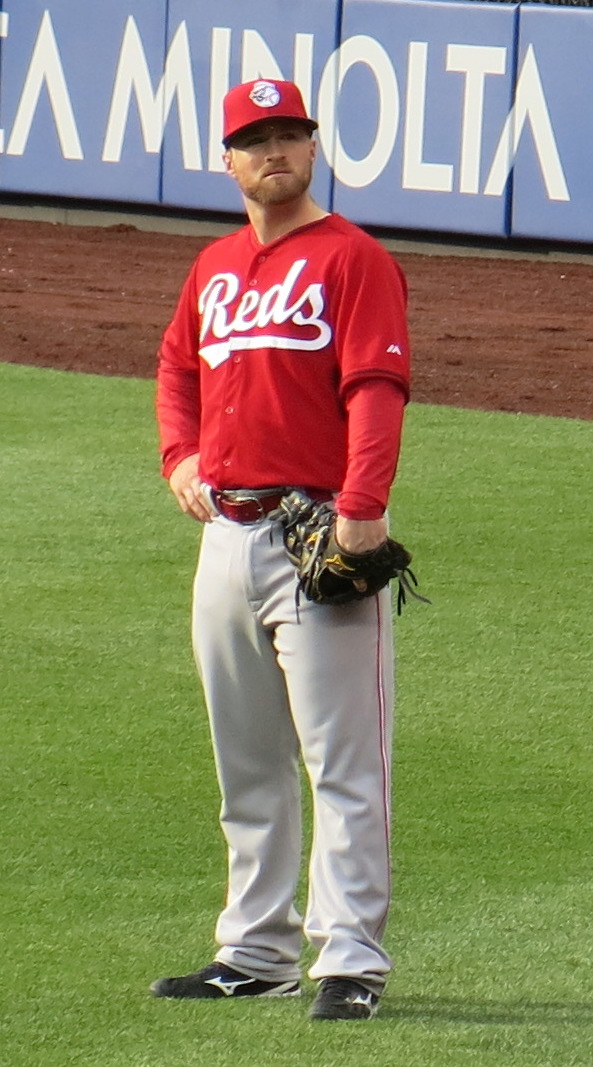
- Barnhart with the Cincinnati Reds in 2016
- Catcher
- Born: January 7, 1991 (age 35); Indianapolis, Indiana, U.S.
- Batted: Left Threw: Right

MLB debut
- April 3, 2014, for the Cincinnati Reds

Last MLB appearance
- May 30, 2025, for the Texas Rangers

MLB statistics
- Batting average: .241
- Home runs: 53
- Runs batted in: 292
- Stats at Baseball Reference

Teams
- Cincinnati Reds (2014–2021); Detroit Tigers (2022); Chicago Cubs (2023); Arizona Diamondbacks (2024); Texas Rangers (2025)

Career highlights and awards
- 2× Gold Glove Award (2017, 2020)

Tucker Jackson Barnhart (born January 7, 1991) is an American former professional baseball catcher. He played in Major League Baseball (MLB) for the Cincinnati Reds, Detroit Tigers, Chicago Cubs, Arizona Diamondbacks, and Texas Rangers. Barnhart made his MLB debut in 2014 and won the Gold Glove Award in 2017 and 2020.

== Early life ==
Barnhart was born in Indianapolis, the son of Kevin and Pam Barnhart, and brother to Paige. When Tucker was 11, the family moved west of Indianapolis to Brownsburg, Indiana. He attended Brownsburg High School and played for the school's baseball team. As a junior in 2008, he hit .500 and was named to the Louisville Slugger High School All-American team. In his senior year at Brownsburg, he was named "Mr. Baseball" for the state of Indiana.

Prior to his senior season, Barnhart committed to attend the Georgia Institute of Technology on a baseball scholarship to play for the Georgia Tech Yellow Jackets.

== Professional career ==
=== Cincinnati Reds (2009–2021) ===
==== Minor leagues ====
Heading into the 2009 Major League Baseball draft, Baseball America rated Barnhart as the best available player from Indiana. Due to his commitment to Georgia Tech, he fell to the 10th round, when he was chosen by the Cincinnati Reds with the 299th overall selection. Barnhart opted to sign with the Reds, rather than enroll at Georgia Tech.

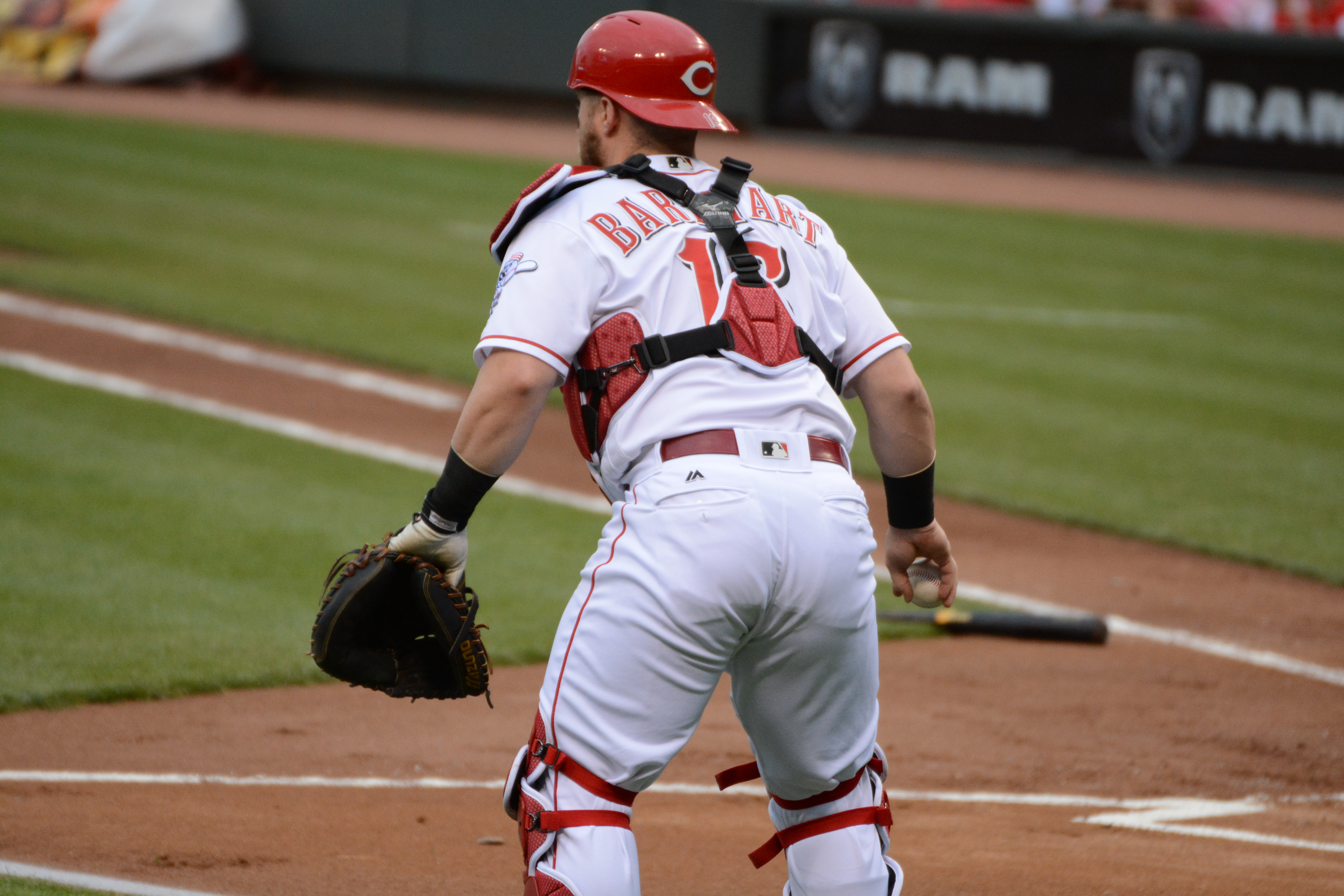
Barnhart catching in 2017

In 2010, Barnhart played for the Billings Mustangs of the Rookie-level Pioneer League. In 2011, he played for the Dayton Dragons of the Single–A Midwest League. He spent the 2012 season with the Bakersfield Blaze of the High–A California League and Pensacola Blue Wahoos of the Double–A Southern League. He played for Pensacola in 2013, and was named a Southern League All-Star. The Reds added Barnhart to their 40-man roster on November 20, 2013.

==== Major leagues ====
With Devin Mesoraco beginning the 2014 season on the disabled list, Barnhart made the Reds' 2014 Opening Day roster, as a backup to Brayan Peña. Barnhart made his major league debut on April 3 against the St. Louis Cardinals. Starting at catcher (with Homer Bailey the starting pitcher) and batting eighth, he went 0-for-4 with one strikeout. Two days later, he got his first big-league hit, a single off New York Mets pitcher Dillon Gee; for the game, Barnhart went 2-for-4.

Barnhart was optioned to the Louisville Bats of the Triple–A International League on April 7, when Mesoraco was activated. He was later recalled by the Reds, and on May 1, he hit his first major league home run, a fifth-inning solo shot off the Milwaukee Brewers' Marco Estrada. He was optioned back to Louisville on May 18. On July 6, with Peña on the paternity list and also forced to play more at first base due to injuries, the Reds recalled Barnhart. Barnhart was optioned back to Louisville on July 11.

Due to injuries to Mesoraco, Barnhart started 67 games at catcher for the Reds in 2015 and 108 games in 2016. On September 22, 2017, Barnhart signed a four-year contract extension with the Reds, worth $16 million, plus a $7.5 million club option for the 2022 season. He led National League catchers in wins above replacement and caught stealing percentage. He also led the major leagues in runners caught stealing (32). After the 2017 season, he won his first Gold Glove Award, the first by a Reds catcher since Johnny Bench's 10-year run from 1968 to 1977.

In June 2019, he suffered a moderate abdominal and oblique strain, and was placed on the injured list. In late August 2019, he gave up switch hitting and became a left-handed hitter.

In 2020 for the Reds, Barnhart played in 38 games, batting .204/.291/.388 with five home runs and 13 RBIs. After the season, he was rewarded the Gold Glove Award for NL catchers, the second Gold Glove Award of his career. On May 7, 2021, Barnhart caught Wade Miley's no-hitter. He finished the 2021 season batting .247/.317/.368 with 7 home runs and 48 RBIs in 116 games.

=== Detroit Tigers (2022) ===
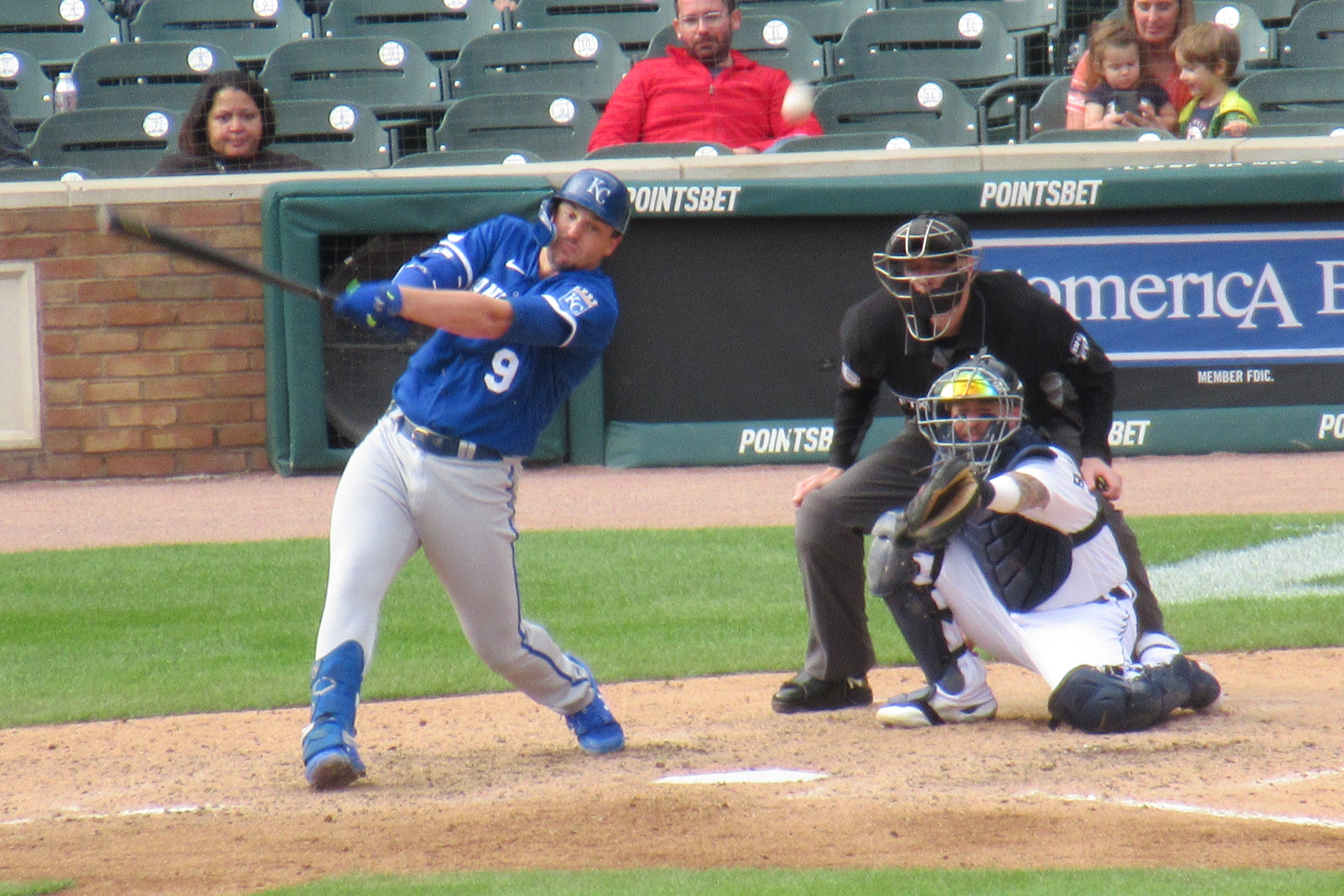
Barnhart catching for the Detroit Tigers

On November 3, 2021, the Reds traded Barnhart to the Detroit Tigers in exchange for Nick Quintana. On November 7, the Tigers exercised the $7.5 million option for Barnhart for the 2022 season. Barnhart batted .221 with a .554 on-base plus slugging in 94 games for the Tigers in 2022.

=== Chicago Cubs (2023) ===
On December 29, 2022, Barnhart signed a two-year, major league contract worth $6.5 million with the Chicago Cubs. In 44 games for the Cubs, he batted .202 with one home run and nine RBIs. On August 19, 2023, Barnhart was designated for assignment by Chicago. He was released by the Cubs the next day.

=== Los Angeles Dodgers ===
On August 30, 2023, Barnhart signed a minor league contract with the Los Angeles Dodgers. In seven games for the Triple-A Oklahoma City Dodgers, he went 5–for–22 (.227) with no home runs and one RBI. Barnhart elected free agency following the season on November 6.

=== Arizona Diamondbacks ===
On January 2, 2024, Barnhart signed a minor league contract with the Arizona Diamondbacks. On March 25, the Diamondbacks select Barnhart's contract after he made the Opening Day roster as the backup catcher. In 31 games for Arizona, he hit .173/.287/.210 with no home runs, six RBI, and one stolen base. Barnhart was designated for assignment by the Diamondbacks on July 2. He was released by the organization on July 6.

=== Cincinnati Reds (second stint) ===
On August 6, 2024, Barnhart signed a minor league contract with the Cincinnati Reds organization. In 21 games for the Triple–A Louisville Bats, he slashed .187/.247/.253 with no home runs and six RBI. Barnhart elected free agency following the season on November 4.

=== Texas Rangers ===
On December 14, 2024, Barnhart signed a minor league contract with the Texas Rangers. He began the 2025 season with the Triple-A Round Rock Express, hitting .246 with two home runs and 12 RBI over 20 games. On April 30, 2025, the Rangers selected Barnhart's contract, adding him to their active roster. In eight appearances for Texas, he went 3-for-13 (.231) with one walk. Barnhart was designated for assignment on June 1. He elected free agency after clearing waivers on June 3. Barnhart re-signed with Texas on a minor league contract the following day. On June 30, Barnhart announced his retirement from professional baseball.

== Personal life ==
Barnhart and his wife, Sierra, married in November 2015. They welcomed their first child, a son, in September 2017. Their second son was born in 2020.

Barnhart grew up just west of Indianapolis in the city of Brownsburg and now resides just northwest of Indianapolis. He is a childhood friend of Gordon Hayward and Drew Storen.
