= 2020 St. Louis Cardinals season =

Major League Baseball season

2020 St. Louis Cardinals
- League: National League
- Division: Central
- Ballpark: Busch Stadium
- City: St. Louis, Missouri
- Record: 30–28 (.517)
- Divisional place: 2nd
- Owners: William DeWitt Jr.
- General managers: Mike Girsch
- Managers: Mike Shildt
- Television: Fox Sports Midwest (Dan McLaughlin, Rick Horton, Jim Edmonds, Brad Thompson)
- Radio: KMOX NewsRadio 1120; St. Louis Cardinals Radio Network (Mike Shannon, John Rooney, Rick Horton, Mike Claiborne)
- Stats: ESPN.com; Baseball Reference

The 2020 St. Louis Cardinals season was the 139th for the St. Louis Cardinals of the Major League Baseball (MLB), a franchise in St. Louis, Missouri. It was the 129th season for the Cardinals in the National League, and their 15th at Busch Stadium III. They entered the season as defending NL Central champions.

On March 12, 2020, MLB announced that because of the ongoing COVID-19 pandemic, the start of the regular season would be delayed by at least two weeks in addition to the remainder of spring training being cancelled. Four days later, it was announced that the start of the season would be pushed back indefinitely due to the recommendation made by the CDC to restrict events of more than 50 people for eight weeks.

On June 23, commissioner Rob Manfred unilaterally implemented a 60-game season. Players reported to training camps on July 1 in order to resume spring training and prepare for a July 24 Opening Day.

On July 1, 2020, it was announced the Cardinals would play the Chicago White Sox on August 13 in the inaugural MLB at Field of Dreams game, replacing the New York Yankees. The appearance in Dyersville, Iowa also replaces the team's canceled trip to London in June for a series with National League Central rivals, the Chicago Cubs. On August 3, MLB canceled the Field of Dreams game due to "logistical problems."

The Cardinals made the expanded playoffs but lost to the San Diego Padres in the NLWCS. The Cardinals suffered just their second winner-take-all game loss in the postseason over their last 10 winner-take-all postseason games played dating back to 2002 (2012 NLCS Game 7 being the other).

== Regular season ==
On August 13, the New York Yankees and Chicago White Sox were scheduled to play the first ever MLB at Field of Dreams game in Dyersville, Iowa. But due to the pandemic and the MLB commissioner announcing the 60-game season and that the AL and NL will play against each other in the same division, the Yankees were taken off the match. On July 1, MLB announced that the Cardinals will replace the Yankees in the game against the White Sox. The game was subsequently postponed to August 12, 2021, with the White Sox' opponent once again being the Yankees. Also, on June 13–14, the Cardinals were supposed to play against the Chicago Cubs in the London Series. But that was also cancelled due to the pandemic.

=== Game log ===
2020 St. Louis Cardinals Game Log, 30–28 (.517)
July: 2–3 (.400) (Home: 2–1; Away: 0–2)

#	Date	Opponent	Score	Win	Loss	Save	Record	Box / L10
1	July 24	Pirates	5–4	**Flaherty** (1–0)	Musgrove (0–1)	**Kim** (1)	1–0	W1
2	July 25	Pirates	9–1	**Wainwright** (1–0)	Williams (0–1)	—	2–0	W2
3	July 26	Pirates	1–5	Keller (1–0)	**Hudson** (0–1)	–	2–1	L1
4	July 28	@Twins	3–6	Bailey (1–0)	**Martínez** (0–1)	Romo (1)	2–2	L2
5	July 29	@Twins	0–3	Hill (1–0)	**Ponce de Leon** (0–1)	Rogers (1)	2–3	L3
—	July 31	@Brewers	**Postponed (COVID-19)** (Makeup date: August 2)					

August: 11–10 (.524) (Home: 6–8; Away: 5–2)

#	Date	Opponent	Score	Win	Loss	Save	Record	Box / L10
—	August 1	@Brewers	**Postponed (COVID-19)** (Makeup date: September 14)					
—	August 2 (1)	@Brewers	**Postponed (COVID-19)** (Makeup date: September 16)					
—	August 2 (2)	@Brewers	**Postponed (COVID-19)** (Makeup date: September 25)					
—	August 3	Tigers	**Postponed (COVID-19)** (Makeup date: August 5)					
—	August 4	@Tigers	**Postponed (COVID-19)** (Makeup date: August 13)					
—	August 5 (1)	@Tigers	**Postponed (COVID-19)** (Makeup date: August 13)					
—	August 5 (2)	Tigers	**Postponed (COVID-19)** (Makeup date: September 10)					
—	August 6	Tigers	**Postponed (COVID-19)** (Makeup date: September 10)					
—	August 7	Cubs	**Postponed (COVID-19)** (Makeup date: August 17)					
—	August 8	Cubs	**Postponed (COVID-19)** (Makeup date: August 19)					
—	August 9	Cubs	**Postponed (COVID-19)** (Makeup date: September 5)					
—	August 10	Pirates	**Postponed (COVID-19)** (Makeup date: August 27)					
—	August 11	Pirates	**Postponed (COVID-19)** (Makeup date: August 27)					
—	August 12	Pirates	**Postponed (COVID-19)** (Makeup date: September 18)					
—	August 13	@White Sox	**Postponed (Logistics at "Field of Dreams")** (Makeup date: August 14)					
—	August 13 (1)	@Tigers	**Postponed (COVID-19)** (Makeup date: September 28)					
—	August 13 (2)	@Tigers	**Postponed (COVID-19)** (Makeup date: September 28)					
—	August 14	@White Sox	**Postponed (COVID-19)** (Makeup date: August 15)					
6	August 15 (1)	@White Sox	5–1	**Wainwright** (2–0)	Giolito (1–2)	–	3–3	W1
7	August 15 (2)	@White Sox	6–3	**Cabrera** (1–0)	Marshall (0–1)	**Miller** (1)	4–3	W2
8	August 16	@White Sox	2–7	Keuchel (3–2)	**Hudson** (0–2)	—	4–4	L1
9	August 17 (1)	@Cubs	3–1	**Gallegos** (1–0)	Hendricks (3–2)	**Miller** (2)	5–4	W1
10	August 17 (2)	Cubs	4–5	Underwood Jr. (1–0)	**Webb** (0–1)	Jeffress (2)	5–5	L1
11	August 18	@Cubs	3–6	Darvish (4–1)	**Ponce de Leon** (0–2)	Wick (4)	5–6	L2
12	August 19 (1)	@Cubs	9–3 (7)	**Webb** (1–1)	Mills (2–2)	—	6–6	W1
13	August 19 (2)	Cubs	2–4 (7)	Jeffress (2–1)	**Miller** (0–1)	Kimbrel (1)	6–7	L1
14	August 20	Reds	5–4	**Elledge** (1–0)	Iglesias (1–2)	—	7–7	W1
15	August 21	Reds	2–4	Lorenzen (1–1)	**Cabrera** (1–1)	Iglesias (3)	7–8	L1
16	August 22	Reds	3–0	**Kim** (1–0)	Miley (0–3)	**Gallegos** (1)	8–8	W1
17	August 23	Reds	6–2	**Cabrera** (2–1)	Mahle (0–1)	—	9–8	W2
18	August 24	Royals	9–3	**Flaherty** (2–0)	Keller (3–1)	—	10–8	W3
19	August 25	Royals	4–5	Staumont (1–1)	**Gant** (0–1)	Rosenthal (7)	10–9	L1
20	August 26	Royals	6–5	**Reyes** (1–0)	Rosario (0–1)	—	11–9	W1
21	August 27 (1)	Pirates	3–4 (8)	Stratton (2–0)	**Gant** (0–2)	Rodríguez (2)	11–10	L1
22	August 27 (2)	Pirates	0–2 (7)	Ponce (1–1)	**Oviedo** (0–1)	Turley (1)	11–11	L2
23	August 28	Indians	2–14	Hill (1–0)	**Ponce de Leon** (0–3)	Plutko (1)	11–12	L3
24	August 29	Indians	1–2 (12)	Wittgren (2–0)	**Reyes** (1–1)	Hand (10)	11–13	L4
25	August 30	Indians	7–2	**Wainwright** (3–0)	Civale (3–4)	—	12–13	W1
26	August 31	@Reds	7–5	**Hudson** (1–2)	DeSclafani (1–2)	**Gallegos** (2)	13–13	W2

September: 17–15 (.531) (Home: 6–6; Away: 11–9)

#	Date	Opponent	Score	Win	Loss	Save	Record	Box / L10
27	September 1	@Reds	16–2	**Kim** (2–0)	Gray (5–2)	—	14–13	W3
28	September 2	@Reds	3–4	Iglesias (2–2)	**Gallegos** (1–1)	—	14–14	L1
29	September 4	@Cubs	1–4	Darvish (7–1)	**Flaherty** (2–1)	Jeffress (5)	14–15	L2
30	September 5 (1)	@Cubs	4–2 (7)	**Wainwright** (4–0)	Alzolay (0–1)	**Gallegos** (3)	15–15	W1
31	September 5 (2)	Cubs	5–1 (7)	**Helsley** (1–0)	Rea (1–1)	—	16–15	W2
32	September 6	@Cubs	7–3	**Hudson** (2–2)	Lester (2–2)	—	17–15	W3
33	September 7	@Cubs	1–5	Hendricks (5–4)	**Oviedo** (0–2)	—	17–16	L1
34	September 8 (1)	Twins	3–7 (7)	Berríos (4–3)	**Martínez** (0–2)	—	17–17	L2
35	September 8 (2)	Twins	6–4 (7)	**Cabrera** (3–1)	Dobnak (6–3)	**Gallegos** (4)	18–17	W1
36	September 10 (1)	Tigers	12–2 (7)	**Flaherty** (3–1)	Skubal (1–2)	—	19–17	W2
37	September 10 (2)	Tigers	3–6 (7)	Cisnero (2–2)	**Gallegos** (1–2)	Garcia (2)	19–18	L1
38	September 11	Reds	1–3	Castillo (2–5)	**Wainwright** (4–2)	—	19–19	L2
39	September 12	Reds	7–1	**Hudson** (3–2)	Antone (0–2)	—	20–19	W1
40	September 13	Reds	5–10	Bradley (2–0)	**Gant** (0–3)	Iglesias (7)	20–20	L1
41	September 14 (1)	@Brewers	1–2 (8)	Peralta (2–1)	**Helsley** (1–1)	—	20–21	L2
42	September 14 (2)	@Brewers	3–2 (9)	**Cabrera** (4–1)	Topa (0–1)	**Webb** (1)	21–21	W1
43	September 15	@Brewers	3–18	Anderson (3–3)	**Flaherty** (3–2)	—	21–22	L1
44	September 16 (1)	@Brewers	4–2 (7)	**Wainwright** (5–1)	Woodruff (2–4)	—	22–22	W1
45	September 16 (2)	@Brewers	0–6 (7)	Peralta (3–1)	**Oviedo** (0–3)	—	22–23	L1
46	September 17	@Pirates	1–5	Brault (1–3)	**Gomber** (0–1)	—	22–24	L2
47	September 18 (1)	@Pirates	6–5 (7)	**Reyes** (2–1)	Williams (1–8)	**Helsley** (1)	23–24	W1
48	September 18 (2)	Pirates	7–2 (7)	**Miller** (1–1)	Kuhl (1–3)	—	24–24	W2
49	September 19	@Pirates	5–4	**Woodford** (1–0)	Howard (2–3)	**Cabrera** (1)	25–24	W3
50	September 20	@Pirates	2–1	**Flaherty** (4–2)	Holland (1–3)	**Miller** (3)	26–24	W4
51	September 21	@Royals	1–4	Staumont (2–1)	**Wainwright** (5–2)	Holland (6)	26–25	L1
52	September 22	@Royals	5–0	**Gomber** (1–1)	Singer (3–5)	—	27–25	W1
53	September 23	@Royals	3–12	Duffy (4–4)	**Martínez** (0–3)	—	27–26	L1
54	September 24	Brewers	4–2	**Kim** (3–0)	Burnes (4–1)	**Miller** (4)	28–26	W1
55	September 25 (1)	Brewers	0–3	Williams (4–1)	**Flaherty** (4–3)	Hader (12)	28–27	L1
56	September 25 (2)	@Brewers	9–1 (7)	**Ponce de Leon** (1–3)	Lindblom (2–4)	—	29–27	W1
57	September 26	Brewers	0–3	Woodruff (3–5)	**Wainwright** (5–3)	Hader (13)	29–28	L1
58	September 27	Brewers	5–2	**Gallegos** (2–2)	Anderson (4–4)	**Reyes** (1)	30–28	W1
59	September 28 (1)	@Tigers	Cancelled					
60	September 28 (2)	@Tigers	Cancelled					

Legend: = Win = Loss = Postponement
Bold = Cardinals team member

=== Season standings ===
==== National League Central ====
NL Central
Team	W	L	Pct.	GB	Home	Road
Chicago Cubs	34	26	.567	—	19‍–‍14	15‍–‍12
St. Louis Cardinals	30	28	.517	3	14‍–‍13	16‍–‍15
Cincinnati Reds	31	29	.517	3	16‍–‍13	15‍–‍16
Milwaukee Brewers	29	31	.483	5	15‍–‍14	14‍–‍17
Pittsburgh Pirates	19	41	.317	15	13‍–‍19	6‍–‍22

If rescheduled games are the difference between the 5–8th seed in the playoffs, they are not played. The Cardinals did not play two games.

==== National League playoff standings ====
Division leaders
Team	W	L	Pct.
Los Angeles Dodgers	43	17	.717
Atlanta Braves	35	25	.583
Chicago Cubs	34	26	.567

Division 2nd place
Team	W	L	Pct.
San Diego Padres	37	23	.617
St. Louis Cardinals	30	28	.517
Miami Marlins	31	29	.517

Wild Card teams (Top 2 teams qualify for postseason)
Team	W	L	Pct.	GB
Cincinnati Reds	31	29	.517	+2
Milwaukee Brewers	29	31	.483	—
San Francisco Giants	29	31	.483	—
Philadelphia Phillies	28	32	.467	1
Washington Nationals	26	34	.433	3
New York Mets	26	34	.433	3
Colorado Rockies	26	34	.433	3
Arizona Diamondbacks	25	35	.417	4
Pittsburgh Pirates	19	41	.317	10

==== Record vs. opponents ====
2020 National League record Source: MLB Standings Grid – 2020
Team	**CHC**	**CIN**	**MIL**	**PIT**	**STL**	AL
Chicago	—	6–4	5–5	6–4	5–5	12–8
Cincinnati	4–6	—	6–4	7–3	4–6	10–10
Milwaukee	5–5	4–6	—	5–5	5–5	10–10
Pittsburgh	4–6	3–7	5–5	—	4–6	3–17
St. Louis	5–5	6–4	5–5	6–4	—	8–10

=== Opening Day lineup ===
16	Kolten Wong	2B
19	Tommy Edman	3B
46	Paul Goldschmidt	1B
11	Paul DeJong	SS
13	Matt Carpenter	DH
4	Yadier Molina	C
25	Dexter Fowler	RF
41	Tyler O'Neill	LF
48	Harrison Bader	CF
22	Jack Flaherty	P

=== COVID-19 outbreak ===
On July 31, 2020, the Cardinals announced two of their players have tested positive for COVID-19. Their game against the Milwaukee Brewers in Milwaukee that day was postponed. Following additional positive test results, the rest of the three-game series with the Brewers and the four-game series with the Detroit Tigers were also postponed. It was later revealed that there were six staff members who had tested positive and seven players including Yadier Molina, Paul DeJong, Edmundo Sosa, Rangel Ravelo, Junior Fernández, and Kodi Whitley. Because of the timing of a simultaneous move to the IR list, it is speculated that the seventh player was Carlos Martinez, which he later confirmed on his personal Instagram.

As the Cardinals prepared to return to play against the Chicago Cubs again on August 7, three additional members of the Cardinals tested positive for COVID-19. As a result, the three-game series against the Cubs was postponed. A day later, the Cardinals three-game series against the Pittsburgh Pirates was also postponed. It was later announced that the players were Austin Dean and roommates Ryan Helsley and Lane Thomas. Additionally, one other staff member had newly tested positive bringing the team total of positive tests to 17, including 10 players. Austin Gomber was added to the Covid IL due to contact tracing even though he has not tested positive and returned to play on August 19.

On August 13, it was announced that the Cardinals' season would resume that Saturday with a doubleheader against the Chicago White Sox. Multiple doubleheaders would be added throughout the season to try to make up as many lost games as possible. As part of a series of roster and staff changes, former third base coach Jose Oquendo returned to the team as an addition to the coaching staff while assistant coach Willie McGee opted out for the season due to personal health concerns. Third base coach Pop Warner returned to the club in time for the August 27 doubleheader against the Pittsburgh Pirates.

The Cardinals took the unusual step of renting 41 cars and having staff and players drive from St. Louis to Chicago in their own cars to avoid any further outbreaks. The Cardinals returned to play on August 15 with a doubleheader against the White Sox. After finishing the three-game series against the White Sox, the Cardinals played two doubleheaders in three days against the Cubs. In the second game of each doubleheader, the Cardinals were the designated home team. As a result, the Cardinals played eight games in five days. They finished that stretch with a 4–4 record.

Molina was activated and returned to the lineup on August 20 and many of the others affected were expected to return to the team within a week.

== Roster ==
2020 St. Louis Cardinals
Roster
Pitchers: 92 Génesis Cabrera; 74 Nabil Crismatt; 86 Jesús Cruz; 61 Seth Elledge; 44 Junior Fernández; 22 Jack Flaherty; 65 Giovanny Gallegos; 53 John Gant; 36 Austin Gomber; 56 Ryan Helsley; 43 Dakota Hudson; 67 Rob Kaminsky; 33 Kwang Hyun Kim; 18 Carlos Martínez; 84 Ryan Meisinger; 21 Andrew Miller; 59 Johan Oviedo; 62 Daniel Ponce de Leon; 77 Roel Ramírez; 29 Alex Reyes; 64 Ricardo Sánchez; 50 Adam Wainwright; 30 Tyler Webb; 38 Kodi Whitley; 40 Jake Woodford	Catchers: 7 Andrew Knizner; 4 Yadier Molina; 32 Matt Wieters; Infielders: 13 Matt Carpenter; 11 Paul DeJong; 19 Tommy Edman; 46 Paul Goldschmidt; 15 Brad Miller; 34 John Nogowski; 55 Max Schrock; 16 Kolten Wong	Outfielders: 48 Harrison Bader; 3 Dylan Carlson; 0 Austin Dean; 25 Dexter Fowler; 41 Tyler O'Neill; 47 Rangel Ravelo; 35 Lane Thomas; 26 Justin Williams	Manager: 8 Mike Shildt; Coaches: 54 Jeff Albert (hitting); 82 Stubby Clapp (first base); 88 Patrick Elkins (run production); 90 Roberto Espinoza (bullpen assistant); 72 Bryan Eversgerd (bullpen); 58 Jobel Jiménez (assistant hitting); 31 Mike Maddux (pitching); 37 Oliver Marmol (bench); 51 Willie McGee (assistant coach); 91 José Oquendo (third base); 94 Jamie Pogue (bullpen catcher); -- Joey Prebynski (run prevention); 87 Russ Steinhorn (coach); 76 Kleininger Teran (bullpen catcher); 75 Ron 'Pop' Warner (third base)

=== Debuts ===
The following players made their Major League Baseball debuts during the 2020 season

- Dylan Carlson (August 15)
- Nabil Crismatt (August 17)
- Jesús Cruz (August 18)
- Seth Elledge (August 16)
- Rob Kaminsky (August 16)
- Kwang Hyun Kim (July 24)
- John Nogowski (August 16)
- Johan Oviedo (August 19)
- Roel Ramírez (August 16)
- Ricardo Sánchez (August 16)
- Max Schrock (August 15)
- Kodi Whitley (July 26)
- Jake Woodford (August 15)

== Player stats ==
=== Batting ===
Note: G = Games played; AB = At bats; R = Runs; H = Hits; 2B = Doubles; 3B = Triples; HR = Home runs; RBI = Runs batted in; SB = Stolen bases; BB = Walks; AVG = Batting average; SLG = Slugging average

Player	G	AB	R	H	2B	3B	HR	RBI	SB	BB	AVG	SLG
Tommy Edman	55	204	29	51	7	1	5	26	2	16	.250	.368
Paul Goldschmidt	58	191	31	58	13	0	6	21	1	37	.304	.466
Kolten Wong	53	181	26	48	4	2	1	16	5	20	.265	.326
Paul DeJong	45	152	17	38	6	0	3	25	1	17	.250	.349
Yadier Molina	42	145	12	38	2	0	4	16	0	6	.262	.359
Brad Miller	48	142	21	33	8	1	7	25	1	25	.232	.451
Matt Carpenter	50	140	22	26	6	0	4	24	0	23	.186	.314
Tyler O'Neill	50	139	20	24	5	0	7	19	3	15	.173	.360
Dylan Carlson	35	110	11	22	7	1	3	16	1	8	.200	.364
Harrison Bader	50	106	21	24	7	2	4	11	3	13	.226	.443
Dexter Fowler	31	90	14	21	2	0	4	15	1	10	.233	.389
Lane Thomas	18	36	5	4	2	0	1	2	0	4	.111	.250
Rangel Ravelo	13	35	5	6	1	0	1	6	0	4	.171	.286
Matt Wieters	19	35	3	7	1	0	0	4	0	3	.200	.229
Max Schrock	11	17	1	3	0	0	1	1	0	0	.176	.353
Andrew Knizner	8	16	1	4	1	0	0	4	0	0	.250	.313
Justin Williams	3	5	0	1	0	0	0	0	0	1	.200	.200
Austin Dean	3	4	1	1	1	0	0	0	0	3	.250	.500
John Nogowski	1	4	0	1	0	0	0	0	0	0	.250	.250
Team totals	58	1752	240	410	73	7	51	231	18	205	.234	.371

=== Pitching ===
Note: W = Wins; L = Losses; ERA = Earned run average; G = Games pitched; GS = Games started; SV = Saves; IP = Innings pitched; H = Hits allowed; R = Runs allowed; ER = Earned runs allowed; BB = Walks allowed; SO = Strikeouts

Player	W	L	ERA	G	GS	SV	IP	H	R	ER	BB	SO
Adam Wainwright	5	3	3.15	10	10	0	65.2	54	25	23	15	54
Jack Flaherty	4	3	4.91	9	9	0	40.1	33	22	22	16	49
Dakota Hudson	3	2	2.77	8	8	0	39.0	24	13	12	15	31
Kwang-hyun Kim	3	0	1.62	8	7	1	39.0	28	9	7	12	24
Daniel Ponce de Leon	1	3	4.96	9	8	0	32.2	23	18	18	20	45
Austin Gomber	1	1	1.86	14	4	0	29.0	19	6	6	15	27
Johan Oviedo	0	3	5.47	5	5	0	24.2	24	18	15	10	16
Génesis Cabrera	4	1	2.42	19	0	1	22.1	10	9	6	16	32
Tyler Webb	1	1	2.08	21	0	1	21.2	17	5	5	7	19
Jake Woodford	1	0	5.57	12	1	0	21.0	20	13	13	5	16
Carlos Martínez	0	3	9.90	5	5	0	20.0	32	26	22	10	17
Alex Reyes	2	1	3.20	15	1	1	19.2	14	10	7	14	27
John Gant	0	3	2.40	17	0	0	15.0	9	6	4	7	18
Giovanny Gallegos	2	2	3.60	16	0	4	15.0	9	6	6	4	21
Andrew Miller	1	1	2.77	16	0	4	13.0	9	4	4	5	16
Ryan Helsley	1	1	5.25	12	0	1	12.0	8	8	7	8	10
Seth Elledge	1	0	4.63	12	0	0	11.2	11	6	6	8	14
Nabil Crismatt	0	0	3.24	6	0	0	8.1	6	3	3	1	8
Ricardo Sánchez	0	0	6.75	3	0	0	5.1	5	4	4	5	4
Rob Kaminsky	0	0	1.93	5	0	0	4.2	3	3	1	2	3
Kodi Whitley	0	0	1.93	4	0	0	4.2	2	1	1	1	5
Junior Fernández	0	0	18.00	3	0	0	3.0	6	6	6	2	2
Ryan Meisinger	0	0	0.00	2	0	0	2.2	1	0	0	4	3
Max Schrock	0	0	0.00	1	0	0	1.0	0	0	0	0	0
Jesús Cruz	0	0	18.00	1	0	0	1.0	3	2	2	1	2
Roel Ramírez	0	0	81.00	1	0	0	0.2	6	6	6	1	1
Team totals	30	28	3.90	58	58	13	473.0	376	229	205	204	464

== Postseason ==
=== Game log ===
2020 Postseason (1–2)
National League Wild Card Series (1–2)

Game	Date	Opponent	Score	Win	Loss	Save	Record
1	September 30	@ Padres	7–4	Gallegos (1–0)	Paddack (0–1)	Reyes (1)	1–0
2	October 1	@ Padres	9–11	Pagán (1–0)	Ponce de Leon (0–1)	Rosenthal (1)	1–1
3	October 2	@ Padres	0–4	Adams (1–0)	Flaherty (0–1)	—	1–2

=== Postseason rosters ===
Playoff rosters
National League Wild Card Series

- Pitchers: 21 Andrew Miller 22 Jack Flaherty 29 Alex Reyes 30 Tyler Webb 33 Kwang Hyun Kim 36 Austin Gomber 38 Kodi Whitley 50 Adam Wainwright 56 Ryan Helsley 59 Johan Oviedo 62 Daniel Ponce de Leon 65 Giovanny Gallegos 92 Génesis Cabrera
- Catchers: 4 Yadier Molina 7 Andrew Knizner 32 Matt Wieters
- Infielders: 11 Paul DeJong 15 Brad Miller 16 Kolten Wong 19 Tommy Edman 46 Paul Goldschmidt
- Outfielders: 0 Austin Dean 3 Dylan Carlson 25 Dexter Fowler 41 Tyler O'Neill 47 Rangel Ravelo 48 Harrison Bader
- Designated hitters: 13 Matt Carpenter

== Minor league system and first-year player draft ==
=== Teams ===
Level	Team	League	Division	Manager	W–L/Stats	Standing	Refs
Triple-A	Memphis Redbirds	Pacific Coast League	American–South	Ben Johnson	0–0	N/A	
Double-A	Springfield Cardinals	Texas League	North	Joe Kruzel	0–0	N/A	
Class A-Advanced	Palm Beach Cardinals	Florida State League	South	Dann Bilardello	0–0	N/A	
Class A	Peoria Chiefs	Midwest League	Western	Erick Almonte	0–0	N/A	
Class A Short Season	State College Spikes	New York–Penn League	Pinckney	José León	0–0	N/A	
Rookie	Johnson City Cardinals	Appalachian League	West	Roberto Espinoza	0–0	N/A	
Rookie	GCL Cardinals	Gulf Coast League	East	Joe Hawkins	0–0	N/A	
Foreign Rookie	DSL Cardinals Blue	Dominican Summer League	South	Fray Peniche	0–0	N/A	
Foreign Rookie	DSL Cardinals Red	Dominican Summer League	San Pedro	Estuar Ruiz	0–0	N/A	

=== Major League Baseball draft ===
The 2020 Major League Baseball (MLB) First-Year Player Draft took place on June 10 and June 11. The draft assigned amateur baseball players to MLB teams. Due to the COVID-19 pandemic, the draft was shortened to five rounds.

2020 Draft Order

2020 Draft Tracker (StL Cardinals)

2020 St. Louis Cardinals complete draft list

Round	Pick	Name, Age	Pos / Bats	School (State)	Signing bonus
1	21	Jordan Walker, 18	3B / R	Decatur High School (GA)	$2.90 million
2	54	Masyn Winn, 18	SS/P / R	Kingwood High School (TX)	$2.10 million
2	63	Tink Hence, 17	P / R	Watson Chapel High School (AR)	$1.15 million
2	70	Alec Burleson, 21	OF / L	East Carolina University (NC)	$700,000
3	93	Levi Prater, 21	LHP / S	University of Oklahoma (OK)	$575,000
4	122	Ian Bedell, 21	RHP / R	University of Missouri (MO)	$800,000
5	152	L.J. Jones, 21	OF / R	Long Beach State University (CA)	$100,000
