= Tony Locey =

American baseball player (born 1998)

- Pitcher
- Born: July 29, 1998 (age 28); Columbus, Georgia, U.S.
- Bats: Right Throws: Right

Anthony Quinn Locey (born July 29, 1998) is an American former professional baseball pitcher.

== Amateur career ==
Locey graduated from Houston County High School in Warner Robins, Georgia, and attended the University of Georgia to play college baseball for the Georgia Bulldogs. In 2017, he played collegiate summer baseball with the Brewster Whitecaps of the Cape Cod Baseball League. As a junior at Georgia in 2019, he started 15 games and went 11–2 with a 2.53 ERA and 97 strikeouts over 89 innings.

== Professional career ==
=== St. Louis Cardinals ===
Locey was selected by the St. Louis Cardinals in the third round of the 2019 Major League Baseball draft. He made his professional debut with the Rookie-level Gulf Coast League Cardinals before being promoted to the Peoria Chiefs of the Single-A Midwest League. Over 17 innings between the two clubs, he went 1–2 with a 5.29 ERA and 31 strikeouts. He did not play a minor league game in 2020 since the season was cancelled due to the COVID-19 pandemic.

=== Colorado Rockies ===
On February 1, 2021, the Cardinals traded Locey, Austin Gomber, Mateo Gil, Elehuris Montero, and Jake Sommers to the Colorado Rockies for Nolan Arenado. For the 2021 season, he was assigned to the Fresno Grizzlies of the Low-A West with whom he appeared in 25 games (making ten starts) and went 3–0 with a 3.34 ERA and eighty strikeouts over 64 2/3 innings. He was assigned to the Spokane Indians of the High-A Northwest League to begin the 2022 season. Locey struggled to a 6.22 ERA in 102 2/3 innings pitched between Spokane and the Double-A Hartford Yard Goats.

=== Tampa Bay Rays ===
On March 28, 2023, Locey was traded to the Tampa Bay Rays in exchange for a player to be named later or cash. In 16 games for the High–A Bowling Green Hot Rods, he posted a 4.74 ERA with 17 strikeouts in 19 innings of work. On August 7, Locey was released by the Rays organization.
