= Elehuris Montero =

Dominican baseball player (born 1998)

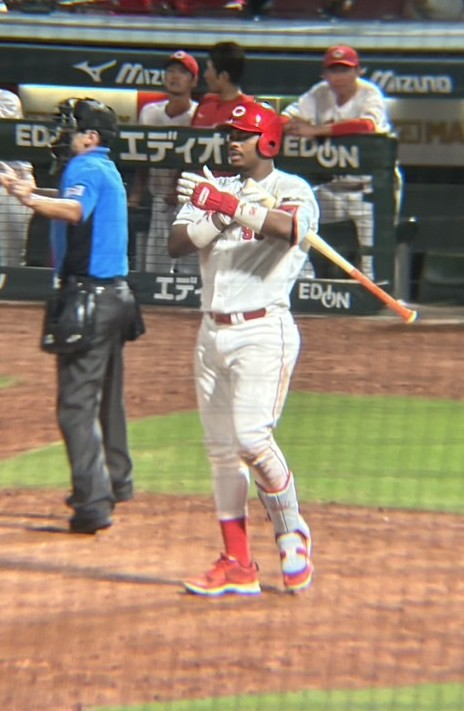
- Montero with the Hiroshima Toyo Carp in 2025

Hiroshima Toyo Carp – No. 95
- First baseman / Third baseman
- Born: August 17, 1998 (age 28); Santo Domingo, Dominican Republic
- Bats: Right Throws: Right

Professional debut
- MLB: May 1, 2022, for the Colorado Rockies
- NPB: March 28, 2025, for the Hiroshima Toyo Carp

MLB statistics (through 2024 season)
- Batting average: .228
- Home runs: 21
- Runs batted in: 87

NPB statistics (through August 18, 2026)
- Batting average: .252
- Home runs: 19
- Runs batted in: 78
- Stats at Baseball Reference

Teams
- Colorado Rockies (2022–2024); Hiroshima Toyo Carp (2025–present)

Elehuris Montero (born August 17, 1998) is a Dominican professional baseball first baseman and third baseman for the Hiroshima Toyo Carp of Nippon Professional Baseball (NPB). He has previously played in Major League Baseball (MLB) for the Colorado Rockies.

== Career ==
=== St. Louis Cardinals ===
Montero signed with the St. Louis Cardinals as an international free agent on August 29, 2014. He made his professional debut in 2015 with the Dominican Summer League Cardinals where he hit .252 with three home runs and 30 RBI in 57 games. Montero returned to the DSL Cardinals in 2016, batting .260 with one home run and 26 RBI in 61 games, and 2017 with the rookie-level Gulf Coast League Cardinals, where he compiled a .277 batting average with five home runs and 36 RBI in 52 games.

Montero started 2018 with the Peoria Chiefs, where he was named a Midwest League All-Star. After slashing .321/.381/.529 with 15 home runs, 69 RBI, and 28 doubles in 102 games, Montero was promoted to the Palm Beach Cardinals in August. In 24 games for Palm Beach, he hit .286 with one home run and 13 RBI. Following the season, Montero was named the Midwest League Most Valuable Player.

Montero began 2019 with the Springfield Cardinals, and was placed on the injured list in April. He returned to play in May, but was once again placed on the IL at the end of the month. Montero was activated once again in July. Over 59 games with Springfield, Montero hit .188 with seven home runs and 18 RBI. He was selected to play in the Arizona Fall League for the Glendale Desert Dogs following the season. Montero was added to St. Louis' 40–man roster following the 2019 season. Montero did not play in a game in 2020 due to the cancellation of the minor league season because of the COVID-19 pandemic.

=== Colorado Rockies ===
On February 1, 2021, Montero was traded to the Colorado Rockies along with Austin Gomber, Mateo Gil, Tony Locey, and Jake Sommers in exchange for Nolan Arenado. To begin the year, he was assigned to the Double–A Hartford Yard Goats. Montero was promoted to the Triple–A Albuquerque Isotopes during the season. Over 120 games for the 2021 season, he slashed .278/.360/.529 with 28 home runs and 86 RBI.

Montero returned to the Isotopes to begin the 2022 season. On April 29, 2022, Montero was recalled and promoted to the major leagues for the first time after Kris Bryant was placed on the injured list. On August 6, Montero hit his first career home run, a solo shot off of Arizona Diamondbacks starter Merrill Kelly. In 53 games during his rookie campaign, he slashed .233/.270/.432 with six home runs and 20 RBI. Montero played in 85 games for the Rockies during the 2023 season, hitting .243/.290/.426 with career–highs in home runs (11) and RBI (39).

Montero played in 61 games for Colorado in 2024, batting .206/.268/.305 with four home runs, 28 RBI and a -1.6 Wins Above Replacement. On June 30, 2024, Montero was designated for assignment by the Rockies. He cleared waivers and was sent outright to Triple–A Albuquerque on July 4. Montero elected free agency following the season on November 4.

=== Hiroshima Toyo Carp ===
On November 8, 2024, Montero signed with the Hiroshima Toyo Carp of Nippon Professional Baseball. He made 105 appearances for the Carp in 2025, batting .255/.301/.391 with nine home runs and 41 RBI.

On November 22, 2025, Montero re-signed with Hiroshima on a one-year, $1.25 million contract.

== See also ==
- List of Major League Baseball players from the Dominican Republic
