= Jhan Mariñez =

Dominican baseball player (born 1988)

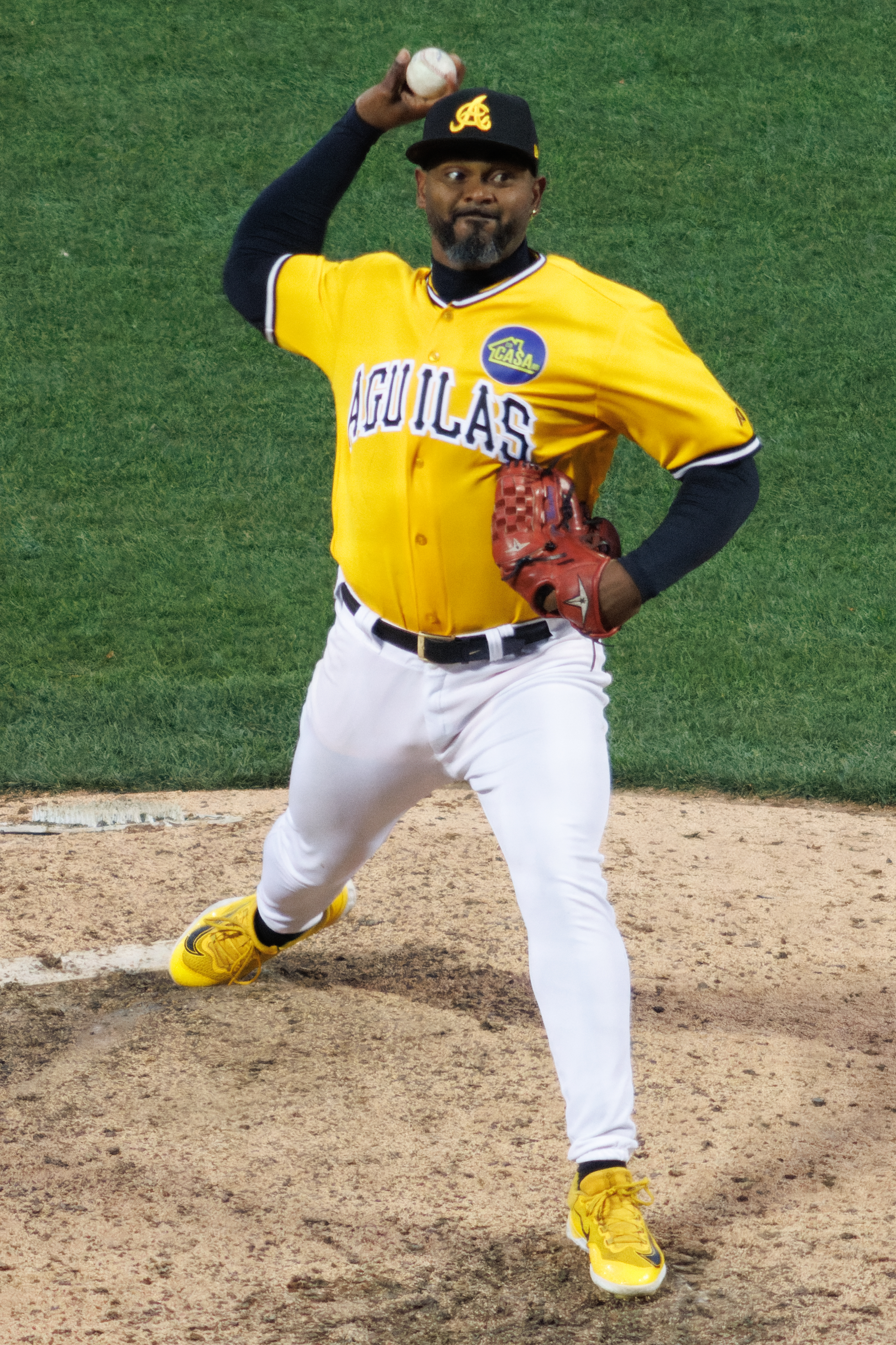
- Mariñez with Águilas Cibaeñas in 2023

Charros de Jalisco – No. 49
- Pitcher
- Born: August 12, 1988 (age 38); Santo Domingo, Dominican Republic
- Bats: Right Throws: Right

MLB debut
- July 16, 2010, for the Florida Marlins

MLB statistics (through 2018 season)
- Win–loss record: 1–5
- Earned run average: 3.56
- Strikeouts: 102
- Stats at Baseball Reference

Teams
- Florida Marlins (2010); Chicago White Sox (2012); Tampa Bay Rays (2016); Milwaukee Brewers (2016–2017); Pittsburgh Pirates (2017); Texas Rangers (2017); Baltimore Orioles (2018)
Medals
Men's baseball
Representing Dominican Republic
Olympic Games
Bronze medal – third place	2020 Tokyo	Team

Jhan Carlos Mariñez Fuente (pronounced "Yan MArin-yez") (born August 12, 1988) is a Dominican professional baseball pitcher for the Charros de Jalisco of the Mexican League. He has previously played in Major League Baseball (MLB) for the Florida Marlins, Chicago White Sox, Tampa Bay Rays, Milwaukee Brewers, Pittsburgh Pirates, Texas Rangers, and Baltimore Orioles.

== Career ==
=== Florida Marlins ===
Mariñez signed with the Florida Marlins as an amateur free agent in 2006. He was called up to the majors for the first time on July 15, 2010.

=== Chicago White Sox ===
Mariñez and Osvaldo Martínez were sent to the Chicago White Sox as compensation for the hiring of Ozzie Guillén by the Marlins, as Guillen had one year remaining on his contract with the White Sox. On July 13, 2012, Marinez was called up to the majors. He was outrighted off the roster on September 6, 2013.

=== Detroit Tigers ===
Mariñez signed a minor league deal with the Detroit Tigers on November 18, 2013, and was assigned to the Triple–A Toledo Mud Hens. Along with former Tiger Nate Robertson, he was released from his minor league contract on May 17, 2014, after struggling with his command.

=== Los Angeles Dodgers ===
He signed a minor league contract with the Los Angeles Dodgers after being released by Detroit. He was assigned to the Double–A Chattanooga Lookouts. In 21 appearances, he was 7–1 with a 4.91 ERA.

=== Tampa Bay Rays ===
On December 31, 2014, he signed a minor league contract with the Tampa Bay Rays. He spent the entire 2015 season between the Double–A and Triple–A levels of the Rays.

=== Milwaukee Brewers ===
On May 13, 2016, Mariñez was acquired off waivers by the Milwaukee Brewers. He made his Brewers debut on May 22, coming in relief of Chase Anderson, facing the New York Mets. He gave up no hits, walked one and struck out four in two innings of work. He was designated for assignment on May 15, 2017, to create room for Brent Suter who was recalled from Triple–A.

=== Pittsburgh Pirates ===
On May 18, 2017, Mariñez was claimed off waivers by the Pittsburgh Pirates.

=== Texas Rangers ===
The Texas Rangers claimed Mariñez from the Pirates off of waivers on August 10, 2017.

=== Baltimore Orioles ===
On November 28, 2017, Mariñez signed a minor league deal with the Baltimore Orioles. He had his contract purchased on July 10, 2018. He was outrighted to Triple–A Norfolk Tides on August 31. He declared free agency on October 3.

=== Diablos Rojos del México ===
On April 3, 2019, Mariñez signed with the Diablos Rojos del México of the Mexican League. He was released on April 19, 2019.

=== Sultanes de Monterrey ===
On February 5, 2020, Mariñez signed with the Sultanes de Monterrey of the Mexican League. Mariñez did not play in a game in 2020 due to the cancellation of the Mexican League season because of the COVID-19 pandemic. After the 2020 season, he played for Águilas Cibaeñas of the Dominican Professional Baseball League (LIDOM). He has also played for Dominican Republic in the 2021 Caribbean Series.

=== Chicago White Sox (second stint) ===
On January 14, 2022, Mariñez signed with the Bravos de León of the Mexican League. However, prior to the 2022 LMB season, on March 8, his contract was purchased by the Chicago White Sox organization. In 14 games for the Triple–A Charlotte Knights, struggling to a 7.88 ERA with 22 strikeouts across 24.0 innings of work. Mariñez elected free agency following the season on November 10.

=== Conspiradores de Querétaro ===
On February 19, 2024, Mariñez signed with the Conspiradores de Querétaro of the Mexican League. In 36 appearances for Querétaro, he posted a 3–2 record and 3.79 ERA with 33 strikeouts and 15 saves across 35 2/3 innings pitched.

Mariñez made 41 relief appearances for the Conspiradores in 2025, posting a 3–1 record with a 6.42 ERA and 28 strikeouts across 40 2/3 innings pitched.

=== El Águila de Veracruz ===
On March 4, 2026, Mariñez and Yairo Muñoz were traded to El Águila de Veracruz of the Mexican League in exchange for Esmil Rogers and Rangel Ravelo. In 37 relief appearances for Veracruz, he posted a 2–3 record with a 4.79 ERA and 44 strikeouts across 35 2/3 innings pitched.

=== Charros de Jalisco ===
On August 4, 2026, Mariñez was traded to the Charros de Jalisco of the Mexican League.
