= Mateo Gil (baseball) =

American baseball player (born 2000)

Charros de Jalisco – No. 3
- Shortstop / Third baseman
- Born: July 24, 2000 (age 25); Newport Beach, California, U.S.
- Bats: Right Throws: Right

Mateo Elijah Gil (born July 24, 2000) is an American professional baseball shortstop for the Charros de Jalisco of the Mexican League.

== Early life ==
Gil was born in Newport Beach, California, while his father, Benji Gil, was playing for the Anaheim Angels. He attended Timber Creek High School in Fort Worth, Texas. As a senior in 2018, he batted .389 with six home runs, 43 RBI, and six triples over 37 games while also compiling a 1.05 ERA.

== Career ==
=== St. Louis Cardinals ===
Gil was selected by the St. Louis Cardinals in the third round (95th overall) of the 2018 Major League Baseball draft. Gil signed with the Cardinals, forgoing his college commitment to Texas Christian University.

Gil made his professional debut that summer with the Rookie-level Gulf Coast League Cardinals, batting .251 with one home run and 20 RBI over 45 games. In 2019, he played with the Johnson City Cardinals of the rookie-level Appalachian League and slashed .270/.324/.431 with seven home runs and 30 RBI over 51 games. He also played in two games for the Palm Beach Cardinals of the High-A Florida State League. That offseason, Gil played in the Mexican Pacific League (LMP).

Gil did not play in a game in 2020 due to the cancellation of the minor league season because of the COVID-19 pandemic. Gil, however, did return to the LMP that winter for the 2020–2021 season, playing with the Tomateros de Culiacan.

=== Colorado Rockies ===
On February 1, 2021, Gil (alongside Austin Gomber, Elehuris Montero, Tony Locey, and Jake Sommers) was traded to the Colorado Rockies in the exchange for Nolan Arenado and $50 million. He was assigned to the Fresno Grizzlies of the Low-A West for the 2021 season, slashing .249/.294/.396 with nine home runs and 56 RBI over 94 games. Gil opened the 2022 season in extended spring training before he was assigned to the Spokane Indians of the High-A Northwest League in mid-May. Over 48 games with Spokane, he batted .247 with six home runs and 26 RBI.

=== New York Mets ===
On December 7, 2022, the New York Mets selected Gil in the minor league phase of the Rule 5 draft. To open the 2023 season, he was assigned to the Binghamton Rumble Ponies of the Double-A Eastern League. In 109 appearances split between the High-A Brooklyn Cyclones, Binghamton, and the Triple-A Syracuse Mets, he slashed a cumulative .217/.287/.390 with 12 home runs and 46 RBI.

Gil split the 2024 season back with Brooklyn and Binghamton, playing in 82 games and hitting .211/.250/.356 with eight home runs, 34 RBI, and two stolen bases. He elected free agency following the season on November 4, 2024.

=== Charros de Jalisco ===
On April 8, 2025, Gil signed with the Charros de Jalisco of the Mexican League.

== International career ==
Gil played for Team Mexico in the 2026 World Baseball Classic, which was managed by his father, Benji.
