= Esmil Rogers =

Dominican baseball player (born 1985)

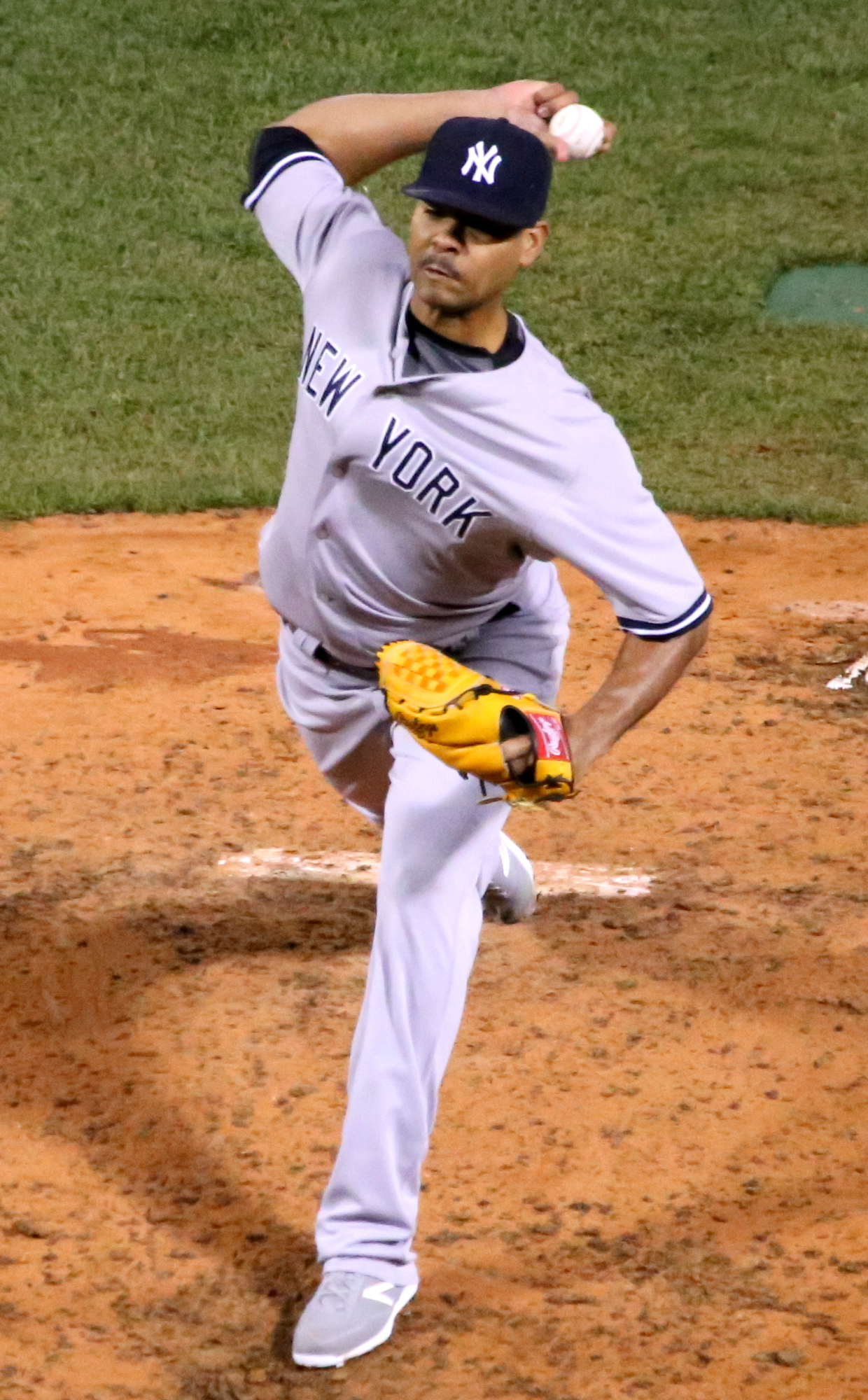
- Rogers with the New York Yankees

Leones de Yucatán – No. 57
- Pitcher
- Born: August 14, 1985 (age 41); San Pedro de Macorís, Dominican Republic
- Bats: Right Throws: Right

Professional debut
- MLB: September 12, 2009, for the Colorado Rockies
- KBO: August 6, 2015, for the Hanwha Eagles
- CPBL: April 17, 2020, for the CTBC Brothers

MLB statistics (through 2015 season)
- Win–loss record: 19–22
- Earned run average: 5.59
- Strikeouts: 386

KBO statistics (through 2018 season)
- Win–loss record: 13–9
- Earned run average: 3.58
- Strikeouts: 149

CPBL statistics (through 2021 season)
- Win–loss record: 8–9
- Earned run average: 4.08
- Strikeouts: 180
- Stats at Baseball Reference

Teams
- Colorado Rockies (2009–2012); Cleveland Indians (2012); Toronto Blue Jays (2013–2014); New York Yankees (2014–2015); Hanwha Eagles (2015–2016); Nexen Heroes (2018); CTBC Brothers (2020–2021)

Career highlights and awards
- CPBL: Taiwan Series champion (2021)

Esmil Antonio Rogers (born August 14, 1985) is a Dominican professional baseball pitcher for Leones de Yucatán of the Mexican League. He has previously played in the KBO League for the Hanwha Eagles and Nexen Heroes, and in the Chinese Professional Baseball League (CPBL) for the CTBC Brothers. Rogers has also played in Major League Baseball (MLB) for the Colorado Rockies, Cleveland Indians, Toronto Blue Jays, and New York Yankees.

== Professional career ==
=== Colorado Rockies ===
==== Minor leagues ====
Rogers was signed as an amateur free agent in 2003 by the Colorado Rockies. Rogers began rookie–level league ball in 2006 with the Casper Rockies of the Pioneer League. The following season, he played for the Asheville Tourists of the Single–A South Atlantic League. In 2008, Rogers played with the Single–A Modesto Nuts of the California League. He played for the Tulsa Drillers of the Double-A Texas League before appearing with the Colorado Springs Sky Sox of the Triple-A Pacific Coast League.

==== Major leagues ====
Rogers was promoted to the Colorado Rockies in September 2009 and made his major league debut on September 12, 2009, giving up two runs and three hits in four innings in the team's 3–2 loss against the San Diego Padres. He returned to the Rockies in 2010, and pitched in 28 games, eight starts, compiling a 2–3 record, 6.13 ERA, and 1.67 WHIP.

Rogers compiled a 3–1 record as a starter in April 2011 despite a 6.33 ERA. Rogers replaced Ubaldo Jiménez, who was traded to the Cleveland Indians, in the pitching rotation after his trade to the Indians on July 30. He allowed one run on one hit and one walk over those five innings of relief, lowering his season-high ERA from 8.49 to 7.31. On June 12, 2012, the Rockies traded Rogers to the Indians for cash considerations after previously being designated for assignment by the Rockies. He had a 0–2 record and 8.06 ERA with the Rockies in 2012.

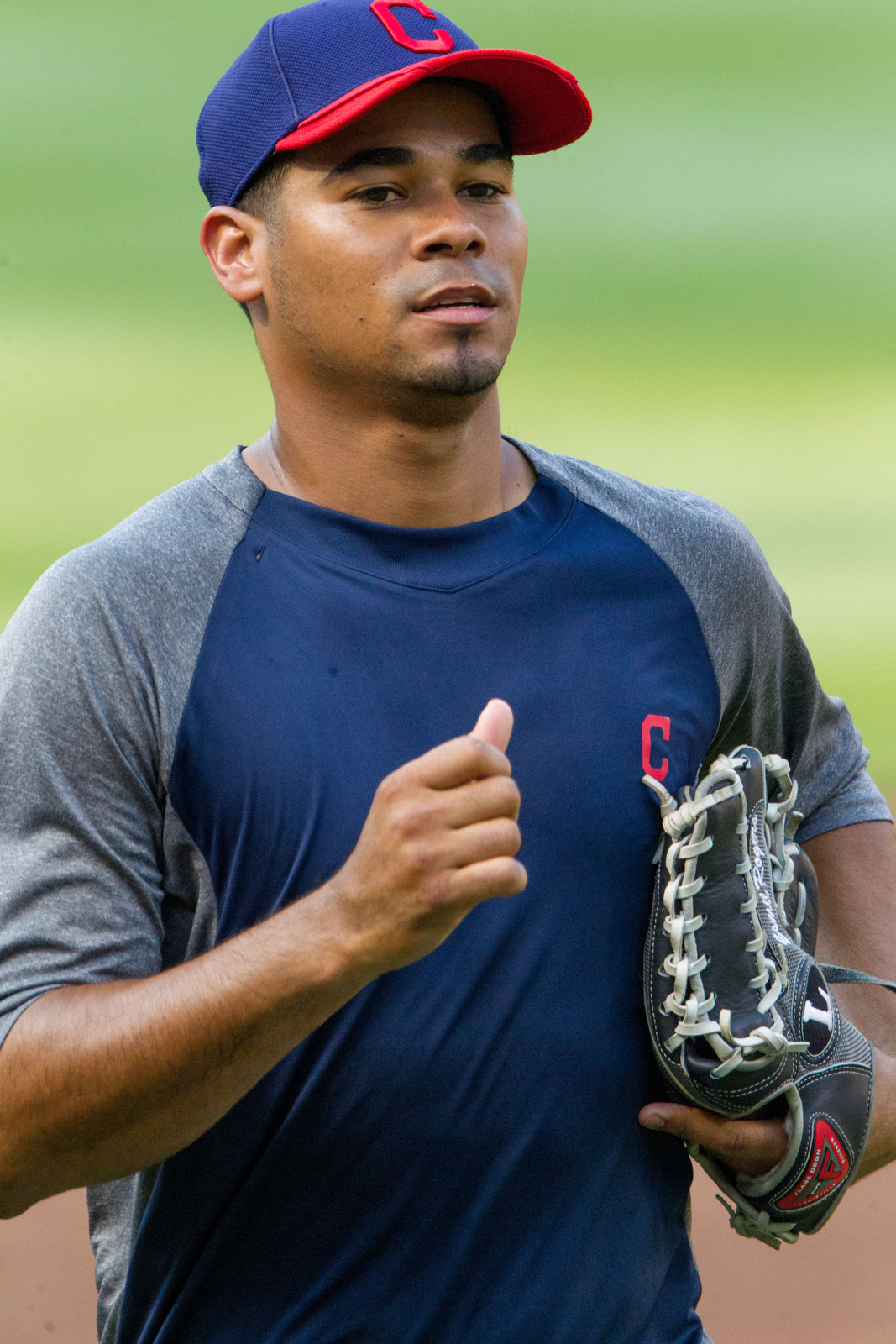
Rogers with the Cleveland Indians in 2012

=== Cleveland Indians ===
Rogers replaced Matt LaPorta on the Indians' active roster on June 13, 2012. "We're hoping that getting him out of the Colorado ballpark and new surroundings, maybe we can cash in on a very good arm", said Indians manager Manny Acta.

Rogers went 3–1 with a 3.06 ERA with 54 strikeouts and 53 innings in 44 games for the Indians.

=== Toronto Blue Jays ===
On November 3, 2012, the Toronto Blue Jays announced that they had traded Mike Avilés and Yan Gomes to the Cleveland Indians for Rogers. Rogers made his first start as a Blue Jay against the Atlanta Braves on May 29, 2013. He pitched 3 1/3 innings and gave up 3 hits, with 2 walks and 4 strikeouts. Rogers would have received the win, but did not pitch the minimum 5 innings required to be the pitcher of record. On June 13, in his third start of the season, Rogers pitched 7 innings against Yu Darvish and the Texas Rangers, earning the win in a 3–1 game.

On June 18, starting against the Colorado Rockies for the first time in his career, Rogers took a no-hitter into the sixth inning and left with an 8–2 lead after pitching 6 2/3 innings. The Blue Jays would win the game 8–3 and extend their winning streak to seven games. The start, Rogers' fourth of the season, put his starters ERA at 1.71. Both manager John Gibbons and catcher J. P. Arencibia attributed Rogers' success to increased confidence and the use of his sinker. Rogers took the loss in a game on June 24 against the Tampa Bay Rays which ended the Blue Jays' 11-game winning streak. In the loss, Rogers gave up three consecutive home runs.

In January 2014, Rogers filed for salary arbitration with Toronto, but came to terms on a 1-year, $1.85 million contract on January 17. On May 23, Rogers was designated for assignment after opening the season with a 6.97 ERA in 16 appearances. He cleared waivers, and was assigned outright to the Triple-A Buffalo Bisons on May 24. His contract was selected on July 22, but he was again designated for assignment on July 27 without appearing for the team.

=== New York Yankees ===
On July 31, 2014, the New York Yankees claimed Rogers off waivers from the Blue Jays. He pitched three scoreless innings in his Yankees debut on August 3. On August 8, Rogers pitched five innings, allowed one run, and recorded the win in his first start as a Yankee.

After the 2014 season, the Yankees signed Rogers to a $1.48 million contract for the 2015 season. After working to a 6.27 ERA with 41 hits allowed in 33 innings, the Yankees outrighted him to the Scranton Wilkes-Barre Yankees of the Triple-A International League on June 13, 2015, removing him from the team's 40-man roster. He was later called back up on June 28, and outrighted again on July 1. He was released on July 31.

=== Hanwha Eagles ===
After his release from the Yankees, Rogers signed with the Hanwha Eagles of the KBO League. He made his Eagles debut as a starting pitcher against the LG Twins on August 6, 2015. Rogers earned a win by throwing a complete game, where he struck out seven hitters and allowed just one run while surrendering three hits as the Eagles recorded a 4–1 victory. In his second start for the Eagles on August 11, against the KT Wiz, he recorded his second KBO victory where he pitched a complete-game shutout in a 4–0 victory as he again allowed just three hits and he again struck out seven batters. Rogers thus became the first pitcher to throw two consecutive complete games in his first two KBO starts. He was released when the team signed Eric Surkamp on July 7, 2016.

=== Washington Nationals ===
On August 1, 2017, Rogers signed a minor league contract with the Washington Nationals. In 7 starts for the Triple-A Syracuse Chiefs, Rogers compiled a 3–2 record and 3.18 ERA with 41 strikeouts across 39 2/3 innings pitched.

=== Nexen Heroes ===
On October 27, 2017, the Nexen Heroes of the KBO League announced that they signed Rogers to a one-year contract for the 2018 season, worth $1.5 million. After breaking his finger, Rogers was released on June 20, 2018, in order to open up a spot for another foreign player on the roster.

=== Guerreros de Oaxaca ===
On February 1, 2019, Rogers signed with the Guerreros de Oaxaca of the Mexican League. In 17 starts for Oaxaca, he struggled to a 6–5 record and 7.19 ERA with 60 strikeouts across 91 1/3 innings pitched. Rogers was released by the Guerreros on July 20.

=== CTBC Brothers ===
On January 9, 2020, Rogers signed with the CTBC Brothers of the Chinese Professional Baseball League. In 17 starts for the team, he registered a 6–4 record and 3.47 ERA with 113 strikeouts across 109 innings pitched. Rogers became a free agent following the season.

Rogers re-signed with the Brothers on February 20, 2021. In 2021, Rogers posted a 2–5 record with a 4.94 ERA and 67 strikeouts in 17 appearances. He was not re-signed for the 2022 season and became a free agent.

=== Sultanes de Monterrey ===
On February 25, 2022, Rogers signed with the Sultanes de Monterrey of the Mexican League. In 14 starts, he registered a 3–5 record with a 5.60 ERA and 46 strikeouts over 72 1/3 innings. Rogers was released by Monterrey on August 1.

=== Mariachis de Guadalajara ===
On February 12, 2023, Rogers signed with the Mariachis de Guadalajara. In 8 starts, he posted a 2–4 record with a 7.12 ERA and 25 strikeouts over 36 2/3 innings. Rogers was released by Guadalajara on June 2.

=== El Águila de Veracruz ===
On June 13, 2023, Rogers signed with El Águila de Veracruz. In 8 games (7 starts) for Veracruz, he posted a 4–2 record and 4.22 ERA with 34 strikeouts across 49 innings pitched.

Rogers made 17 starts for Veracruz in 2024, logging a 6–7 record and 4.85 ERA with 55 strikeouts over 91 innings of work. He logged 17 starts for the team in 2025, posting a 5–6 record and 5.85 ERA with 40 strikeouts over 80 innings pitched.

=== Conspiradores de Querétaro ===
On March 4, 2026, Rogers and Rangel Ravelo were traded to the Conspiradores de Querétaro of the Mexican League in exchange for Jhan Mariñez and Yairo Muñoz. In nine starts for the Conspiradores, Rogers struggled to a 0–4 record with a 9.66 ERA, 14 strikeouts, and 15 walks across 36 1/3 innings. On June 4, Rogers was released by Querétaro.

=== Leones de Yucatán ===
On June 6, 2026, Rogers signed with the Leones de Yucatán of the Mexican League.
