= Yairo Muñoz =

Dominican baseball player (born 1995)

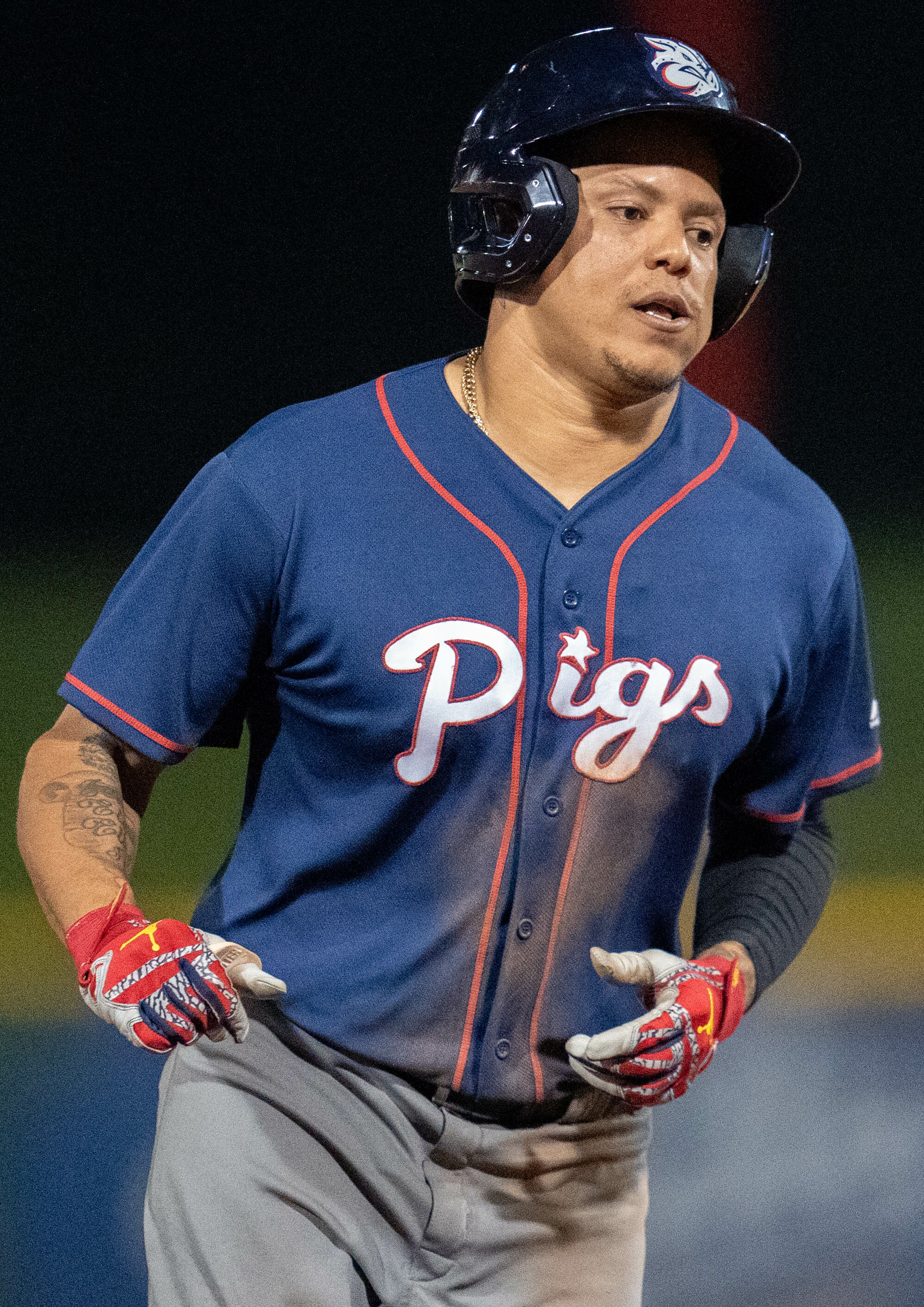
- Muñoz with the Lehigh Valley IronPigs in 2022

Toros del Este – No. 22
- Infielder / Outfielder
- Born: January 23, 1995 (age 31); Nagua, Dominican Republic
- Bats: Right Throws: Right

MLB debut
- March 29, 2018, for the St. Louis Cardinals

MLB statistics (through 2022 season)
- Batting average: .268
- Home runs: 14
- Runs batted in: 66
- Stats at Baseball Reference

Teams
- St. Louis Cardinals (2018–2019); Boston Red Sox (2020–2021); Philadelphia Phillies (2022)

Yairo Muñoz (Note: Yairo is pronounced with a leading J-sound; see voiced palatal affricate.) (Spanish: ['ɟʝaj.ɾo]; born January 23, 1995) is a Dominican professional baseball infielder and outfielder who is currently playing winter baseball for the Toros del Este of the Dominican Professional Baseball League. He has previously played in Major League Baseball (MLB) for the St. Louis Cardinals, Boston Red Sox, and Philadelphia Phillies. Listed at 6 feet 1 inch (1.85 m) and 201 pounds (91 kg), he bats and throws right-handed.

== Career ==
=== Oakland Athletics ===
Muñoz signed as an international free agent with the Oakland Athletics. He made his professional debut in 2012 when he played for the Dominican Athletics of the Rookie-level Dominican Summer League, where he batted.229 in 32 games played. In 2013, he played for the Arizona Athletics of the Rookie-level Arizona League, where he posted a.194 batting average with five runs batted in (RBIs) in 25 games. While playing for the Vermont Lake Monsters of the Low–A New York-Penn League in 2014, Muñoz batted.298 with five home runs, 20 RBIs, and 14 stolen bases in 66 games.

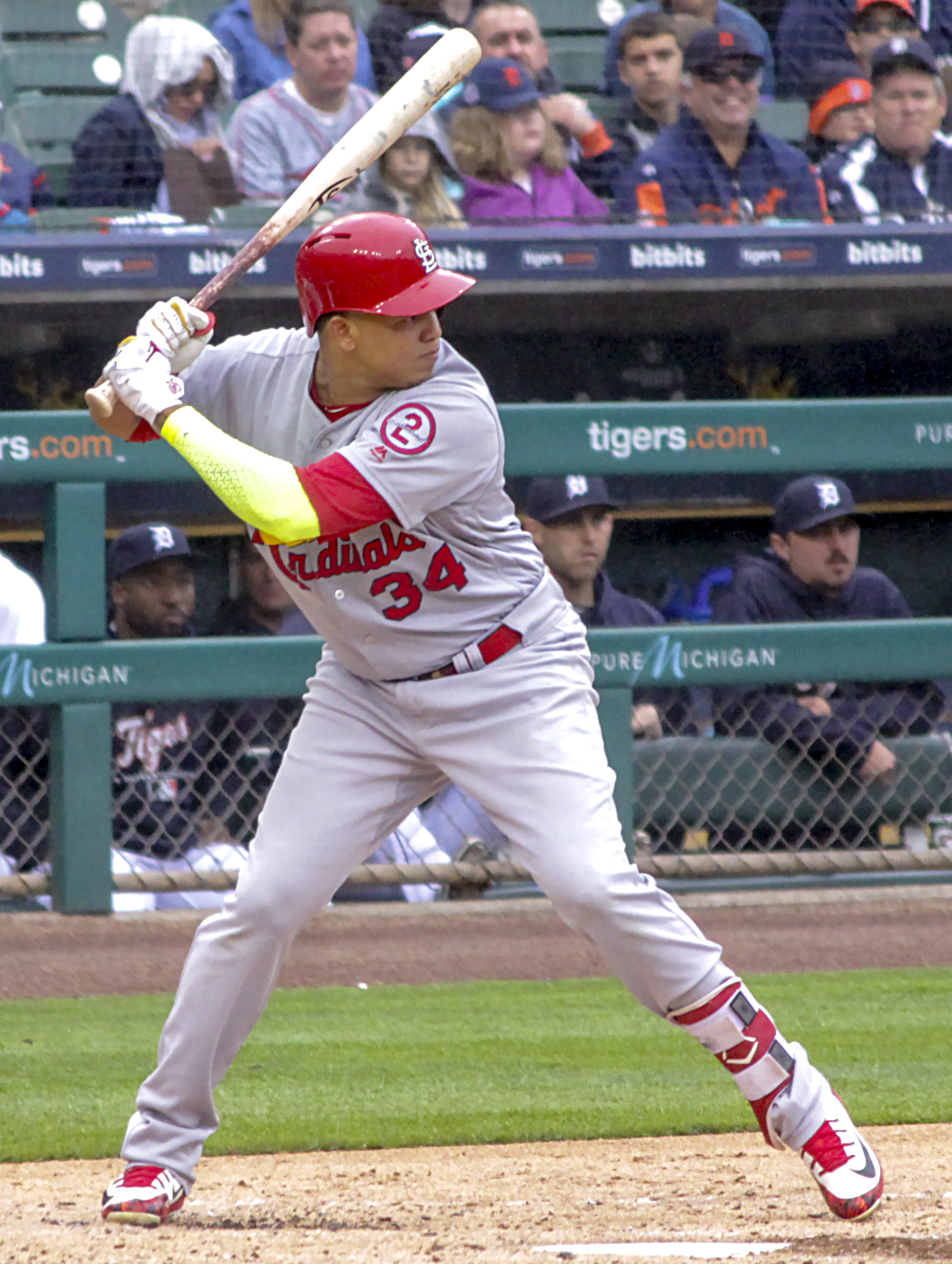
Muñoz batting with St. Louis in 2018.

Muñoz began the 2015 season with the Beloit Snappers of the Single–A Midwest League and received a midseason promotion to the Stockton Ports of the High–A California League. He posted a combined.260 batting average, 13 home runs, and 74 RBIs in 136 total games between the two teams. In 2016, Muñoz played for the Midland RockHounds of the Double–A Texas League, where he and Franklin Barreto switched between playing shortstop and second base, while Muñoz also played third base. In 102 games, he batted.240 with nine home runs and 39 RBIs. After the 2016 season, he played for the Mesa Solar Sox of the Arizona Fall League and the Athletics added him to their 40-man roster to protect him from becoming eligible in the Rule 5 draft. He spent 2017 with both Midland and the Nashville Sounds of the Triple–A Pacific Coast League (PCL), batting a combined .300 with 13 home runs, 68 RBIs, and 22 stolen bases in 112 games between both teams. In addition to the infield, Muñoz played as a center fielder in 2017.

=== St. Louis Cardinals ===
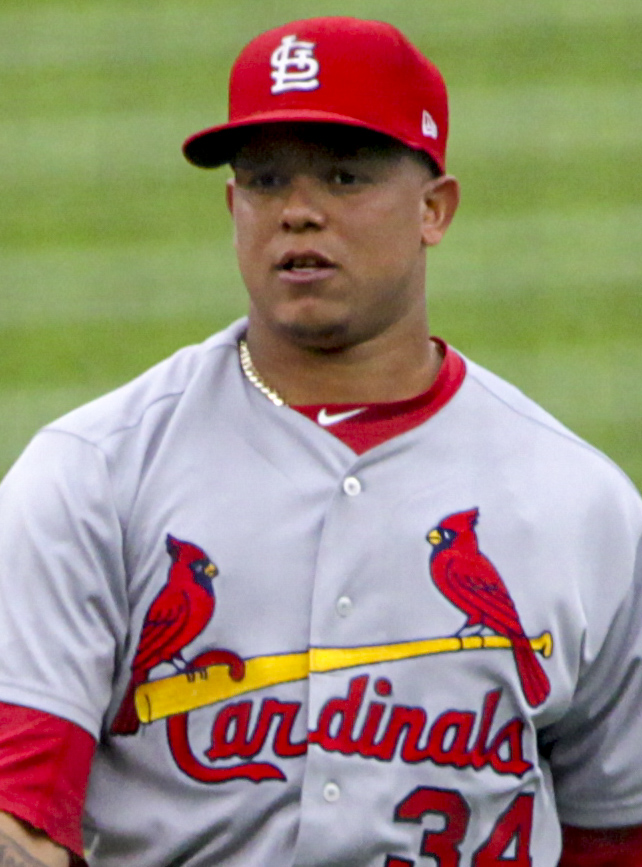
Muñoz with the St. Louis Cardinals in 2018

On December 14, 2017, the Athletics traded Muñoz and Max Schrock to the St. Louis Cardinals in exchange for Stephen Piscotty. During 2018 spring training, he competed for a spot on the Cardinals' Opening Day 25-man roster. After hitting .375/.423/.625 with 18 hits and three home runs, scoring 13 runs with 9 RBIs over 48 at-bats in spring training, the Cardinals chose Muñoz over Harrison Bader and Luke Voit for a spot on the Opening Day roster. During spring training, he played shortstop, center field, right field, and second base. Manager Mike Matheny said on Muñoz's varied skills, "“I haven’t seen anyone whose two primary positions are center field and shortstop.”

Muñoz made his major league debut on March 29. After batting only .111 in 11 games, he was sent back down to the Memphis Redbirds of the PCL on April 16. He was recalled once again on May 18 when Paul DeJong was placed on the disabled list. On May 22, he had four hits in a loss to the Kansas City Royals. His first career walk-off home run came with two outs in the bottom of the ninth inning on May 31 at Busch Stadium against the Pittsburgh Pirates, a three-run shot off Felipe Vázquez to give the Cardinals a 10–8 win. Muñoz was placed on the disabled list for the first time in his major league career on August 11, and was activated on August 22. He finished his 2018 rookie campaign batting .276 with eight home runs and 42 RBIs in 108 games, spending time at six different positions.

On March 7, 2020, Muñoz was released by the Cardinals after leaving spring training without telling the team.

=== Boston Red Sox ===
On March 24, 2020, Muñoz was signed to a minor league contract by the Boston Red Sox; he was subsequently a non-roster invitee to spring training. His contract was selected on August 31, and he made his first appearance with the Red Sox on September 1, against the Atlanta Braves. Muñoz was placed on the 10-day injured list on September 19 with a low back strain. Overall with the 2020 Red Sox, Muñoz appeared in 12 games, batting .333 with one home run and four RBIs.

On December 7, 2020, Muñoz was outrighted off of the 40-man roster and assigned to Triple-A. On August 14, 2021, Muñoz registered a hit to extend his hitting streak with the Worcester Red Sox to 35 games, setting a new record for the Red Sox organization, surpassing the 34-game hitting streak that Dom DiMaggio had with the major-league Red Sox in 1949. Worcester later named Muñoz their MVP for the season, having batted .317 in 85 Triple-A games. Muñoz was added to Boston's active roster on August 27, after two players were placed on the COVID-related list. On September 1, Muñoz himself was placed on the COVID-related list. Muñoz appeared in five games for Boston during 2021, batting 1-for-11 (.091). On October 6, Boston assigned him outright to Triple-A. Muñoz became a free agent following the season.

=== Philadelphia Phillies ===
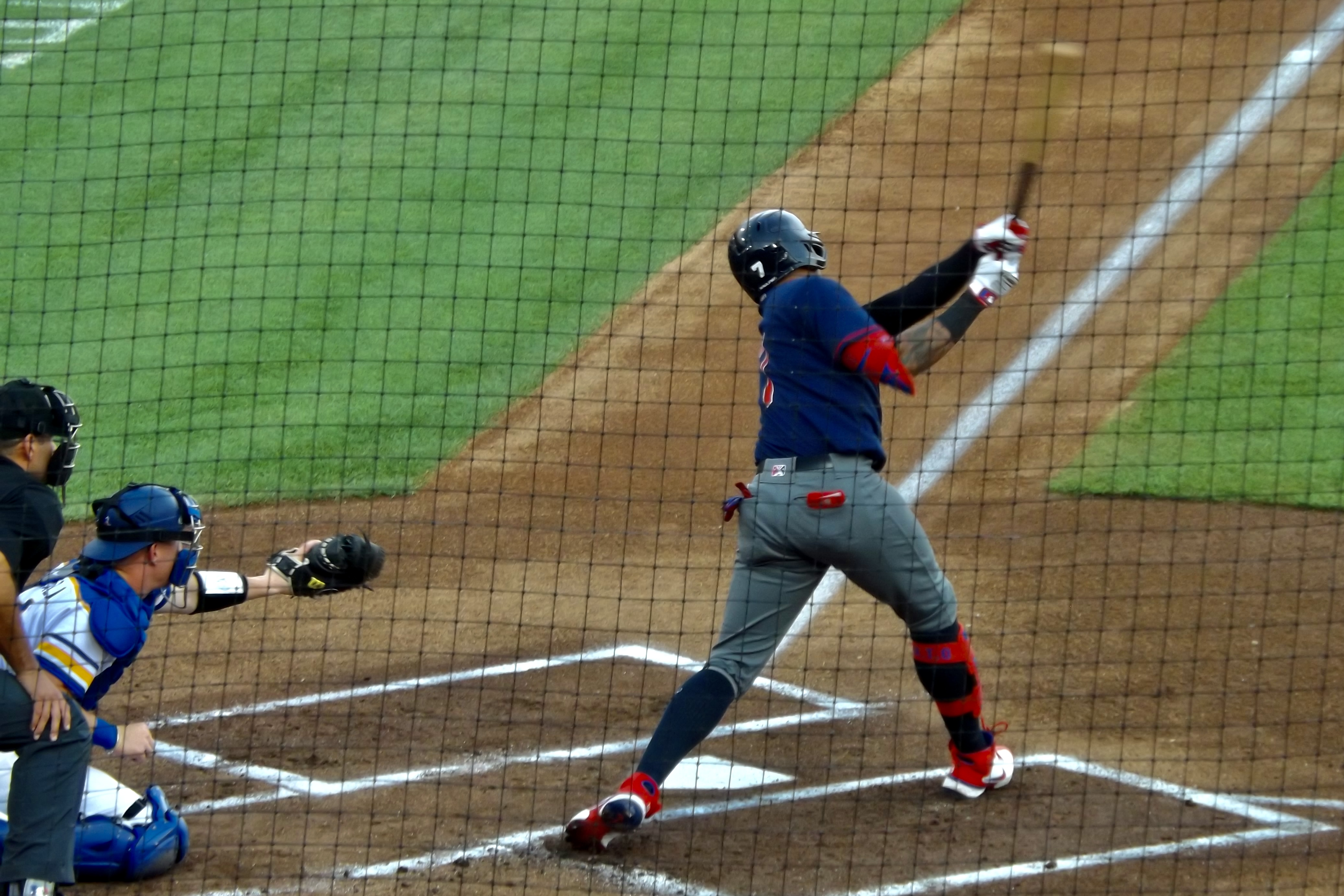
Muñoz batting for the Lehigh Valley IronPigs in August 2022.

On February 12, 2022, Muñoz signed a minor league contract with the Philadelphia Phillies organization. On June 14, 2022, Muñoz was called up from the Triple-A Lehigh Valley IronPigs to play with the Phillies against the Miami Marlins. On November 9, Muñoz was removed from the 40-man roster and sent outright to Triple–A. He elected free agency the following day.

=== Arizona Diamondbacks ===
On January 31, 2023, Muñoz signed a minor league contract with the Arizona Diamondbacks organization. In 12 games for the Triple–A Reno Aces, Muñoz batted .304/.389/.391 with 5 RBI. On June 12, he was released by the Diamondbacks.

=== Tecolotes de los Dos Laredos ===
On February 24, 2024, Muñoz signed with the Tecolotes de los Dos Laredos of the Mexican League. In 56 games for Dos Laredos, he batted .302/.353/.426 with five home runs, 39 RBI, and five stolen bases. Muñoz was placed on the reserve list on July 12, and did not appear for the team for the remainder of the season.

=== Conspiradores de Querétaro ===
On December 20, 2024, Muñoz and Arnaldo Hernandez were traded to the Conspiradores de Querétaro of the Mexican League. In 53 games for the team, he hit .329/.388/.500 with nine home runs, 29 RBI, and three stolen bases.

On March 4, 2026, Muñoz and Jhan Mariñez were traded to El Águila de Veracruz of the Mexican League in exchange for Esmil Rogers and Rangel Ravelo. However, he failed to make the Opening Day roster and was released prior to the start of the season on April 14.

== Personal life ==
Muñoz' father died when he was six years old. He and his two older brothers moved into his aunt and uncle's house in the village of Payita, where 12 people lived in a three-bedroom house, while his mother worked in the next town and sent them the money she earned.
