= Justin Williams (baseball) =

American baseball player (born 1995)

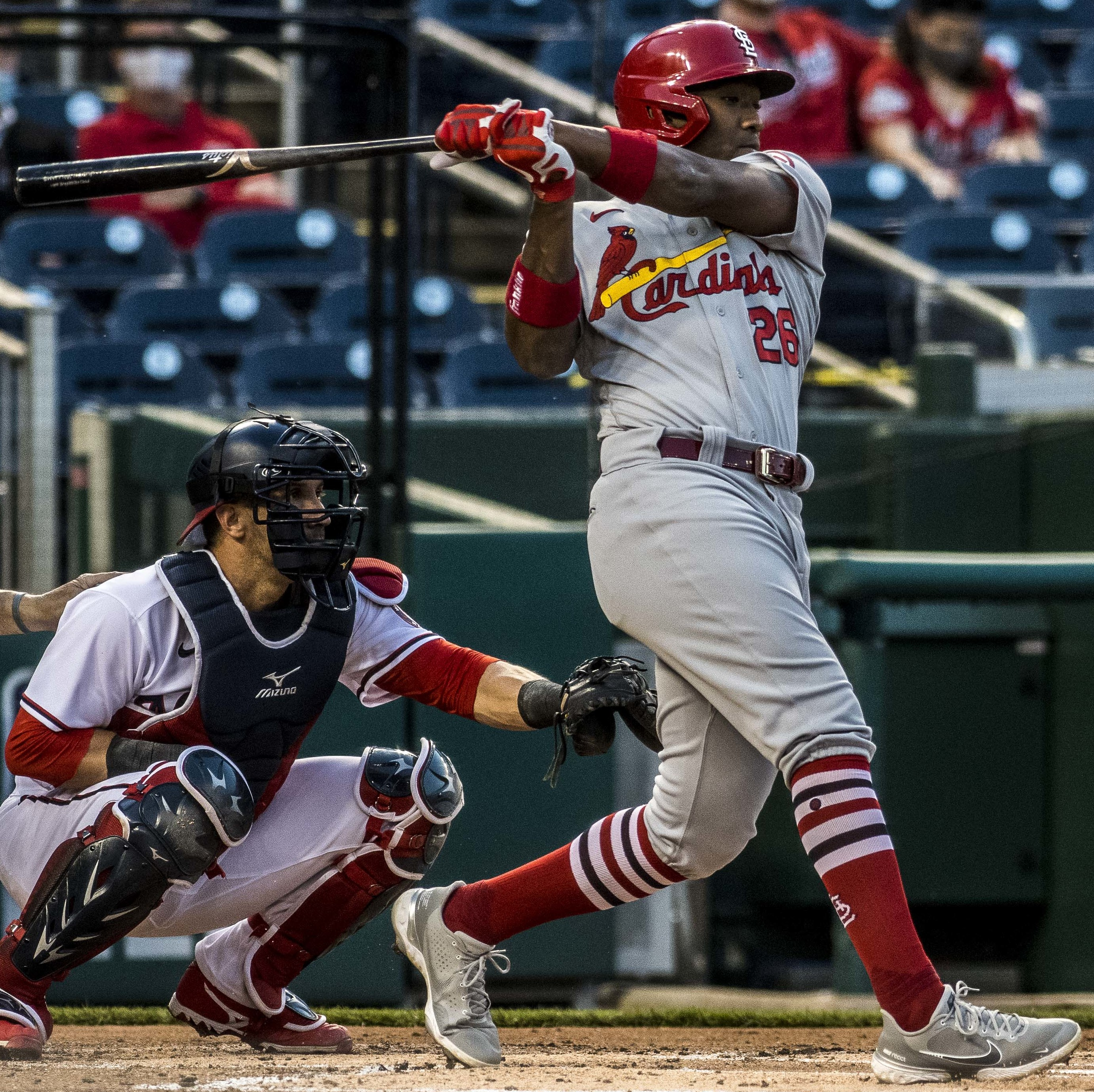
- Williams batting for the St. Louis Cardinals in 2021

Free agent
- Outfielder
- Born: August 20, 1995 (age 30); Houma, Louisiana, U.S.
- Bats: Left Throws: Right

MLB debut
- July 21, 2018, for the Tampa Bay Rays

MLB statistics (through 2021 season)
- Batting average: .160
- Home runs: 4
- Runs batted in: 11
- Stats at Baseball Reference

Teams
- Tampa Bay Rays (2018); St. Louis Cardinals (2020–2021)

Justin Paul Williams (born August 20, 1995) is an American professional baseball outfielder for the Mumbai Cobras of Baseball United. He has previously played in Major League Baseball (MLB) for the Tampa Bay Rays and St. Louis Cardinals.

== Amateur career ==
Williams attended Terrebonne High School in Houma, Louisiana. He hit .443 with 22 home runs and 67 runs batted in (RBI) over 79 games. Williams was drafted by the Arizona Diamondbacks in the second round of the 2013 Major League Baseball draft.

== Professional career ==
=== Arizona Diamondbacks ===
Williams signed with the Diamondbacks rather than play college baseball at Louisiana State University (LSU) and made his professional debut that season with Arizona League Diamondbacks. He also played with the Missoula Osprey and South Bend Silver Hawks that season. He hit .351 with one home run in 51 games. In 2014, he played for Missoula and South Bend. In 74 games he hit .351 with four home runs and 46 RBIs.

=== Tampa Bay Rays ===
On November 14, 2014, Williams along with Andrew Velazquez was traded from the Diamondbacks to the Tampa Bay Rays for Jeremy Hellickson. He spent 2015 with the Bowling Green Hot Rods and Charlotte Stone Crabs, compiling a combined .277 batting average with seven home runs and 48 RBIs in 122 games, and 2016 with Charlotte and the Montgomery Biscuits where he batted .295 with ten home runs and 59 RBIs in 90 total games. In 2017, Williams played for Montgomery where he slashed .301/.364/.489 with 14 home runs and 72 RBIs in 96 games.

The Rays added him to their 40-man roster after the 2017 season. Williams was promoted to the major leagues for the first time on July 21, 2018.

=== St. Louis Cardinals ===
On July 31, 2018, Williams, along with Génesis Cabrera and Roel Ramírez, were traded to the St. Louis Cardinals in exchange for Tommy Pham. Williams was optioned to the minors and would not appear in the major leagues again until September 16, 2020. In 2021, Williams made the Opening Day roster after batting .229 with one home run over 35 spring training at-bats. Williams hit his first major-league home run on April 16, 2021, off of Zach Eflin, in a game against the Philadelphia Phillies. He was eventually placed on the injured list. Over 51 games prior to the injury, he batted .160/.270/.261 with four home runs and 11 RBIs. After being activated, he was optioned to the Memphis Redbirds with whom he finished the year. He was removed from the 40-man roster on November 5, 2021 and elected free agency on November 9. He became a free agent following the season.

=== Philadelphia Phillies ===
On March 8, 2022, Williams signed a minor league contract with the Philadelphia Phillies organization. He split time between four Phillies minor league affiliates: the rookie-level Florida Complex League Phillies, the Single-A Clearwater Threshers, the High-A Jersey Shore BlueClaws, and the Triple-A Lehigh Valley IronPigs. In 27 games, he hit a cumulative .211/.324/.300 with one home run, 11 RBI, and 4 stolen bases. He elected free agency following the season on November 10.

=== Milwaukee Milkmen ===
On April 13, 2023, Williams signed with the Milwaukee Milkmen of the American Association of Professional Baseball. In 31 games for the Milkmen, he batted .225/.328/.342 with 3 home runs, 16 RBI, and 3 stolen bases. On July 4, Williams was released by Milwaukee.

=== Staten Island FerryHawks ===
On July 11, 2023, Williams signed with the Staten Island FerryHawks of the Atlantic League of Professional Baseball. In 21 games for the team, he batted .314/.385/.571 with five home runs, 12 RBI, and 3 stolen bases.

Williams played in two games for Staten Island in 2024, going 3–for–6 (.500) with one RBI. On May 10, 2024, Williams was released by the FerryHawks.

=== Hagerstown Flying Boxcars ===
On May 18, 2024, Williams signed with the Hagerstown Flying Boxcars of the Atlantic League of Professional Baseball. In 27 games for Hagerstown, he hit .177/.270/.313 with three home runs and 11 RBI.

=== Lexington Legends ===
On June 25, 2024, Williams was traded to the Lexington Legends of the Atlantic League of Professional Baseball. In 39 games for Lexington, he slashed .216/.324/.379 with five home runs, 16 RBI, and four stolen bases.

On February 24, 2025, Williams re-signed with Lexington. In six games for Lexington, he went 2-for-21 (.095) with no home runs or RBI. Williams was released by the Legends on May 5.

=== Mumbai Cobras ===
In October 2025, Williams signed with the Mumbai Cobras of Baseball United.

== Coaching career ==
Williams signed with Athletes Untapped as a private baseball coach on Dec 31, 2024.
