= Max Schrock =

American baseball player (born 1994)

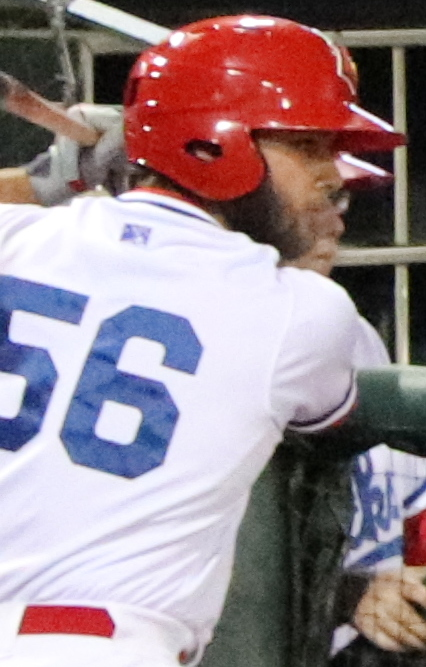
- Schrock with the Memphis Redbirds in 2018
- Second baseman
- Born: October 12, 1994 (age 31); Bremerton, Washington, U.S.
- Batted: Left Threw: Right

MLB debut
- August 15, 2020, for the St. Louis Cardinals

Last MLB appearance
- July 16, 2022, for the Cincinnati Reds

MLB statistics
- Batting average: .256
- Home runs: 4
- Runs batted in: 16
- Stats at Baseball Reference

Teams
- St. Louis Cardinals (2020); Cincinnati Reds (2021–2022)

Max William Schrock (born October 12, 1994) is an American former professional baseball second baseman. He played in Major League Baseball (MLB) for the St. Louis Cardinals and Cincinnati Reds.

== Career ==
=== Amateur ===
Schrock attended Cardinal Gibbons High School in Raleigh, North Carolina. He was drafted by the Arizona Diamondbacks in the 28th round of the 2012 MLB draft. He did not sign with the Diamondbacks and attended the University of South Carolina, where he played college baseball. In 2013, he played collegiate summer baseball with the Cotuit Kettleers of the Cape Cod Baseball League.

=== Washington Nationals ===
After his junior year, he was drafted by the Washington Nationals in the 13th round of the 2015 MLB draft and signed.

Schrock made his professional debut with the Auburn Doubledays in 2015 and spent the whole season there, posting a .308 batting average with two home runs and 14 RBIs in 46 games. He started 2016 with the Hagerstown Suns and was promoted to the Potomac Nationals in June.

=== Oakland Athletics ===
On August 25, the Nationals traded Schrock to the Oakland Athletics for Marc Rzepczynski. Oakland assigned him to the Stockton Ports before promoting him to the Midland RockHounds. Shrock batted a combined .331 with nine home runs and 71 RBIs in 2016, along with 22 stolen bases between the four clubs. He spent 2017 with Midland, where he posted a .321 batting average with seven home runs and 46 RBIs in 106 games.

=== St. Louis Cardinals ===
On December 14, 2017, the Athletics traded Schrock and Yairo Muñoz to the St. Louis Cardinals in exchange for Stephen Piscotty.

In 2018, Schrock was a non-roster invitee to 2018 spring training. He spent the season with the Memphis Redbirds, slashing .249/.296/.331 with four home runs and 42 RBIs in 114 games.

In 2019, Schrock returned to Memphis in 2019 season, slashing .275/.366/.381 with two home runs and 31 RBIs over 85 games.

On August 15, 2020, Schrock’s contract was selected to the MLB roster. He made his MLB debut that day against the Chicago White Sox and notched his first MLB hit against Jimmy Cordero. On August 17, he hit first MLB home run.

=== Chicago Cubs ===
On October 30, 2020, Schrock was claimed off waivers by the Chicago Cubs. He was designated for assignment on February 5, 2021.

=== Cincinnati Reds ===
On February 10, 2021, Schrock was claimed off waivers by the Cincinnati Reds. Schrock played in 53 games during the 2021 season. He slashed .288/.328/.448 with 14 RBIs and 3 home runs. He primarily played as a utility player on defense. He pitched in 2 games with 1.2 innings pitched and 1 strikeout.

Schrock was placed on the 60-day IL on April 5, 2022, after suffering a left calf strain two days prior. He was activated on June 17.

On June 18, 2022, Schrock picked up his first hit and RBI against the Milwaukee Brewers after coming off the injured list. He was designated for assignment on August 29, 2022 and elected free agency on August 30.

=== San Diego Padres ===
On December 19, 2022, Schrock signed a minor league deal with the San Diego Padres. He played in 42 games split between the rookie–level Arizona Complex League Padres and Triple–A El Paso Chihuahuas, batting a combined .288/.371/.460 with four home runs and 24 RBI. Schrock elected free agency following the season on November 6, 2023.

== Personal life ==
Schrock and his wife Sarah married in January 2018.
