= Austin Gomber =

American baseball player (born 1993)

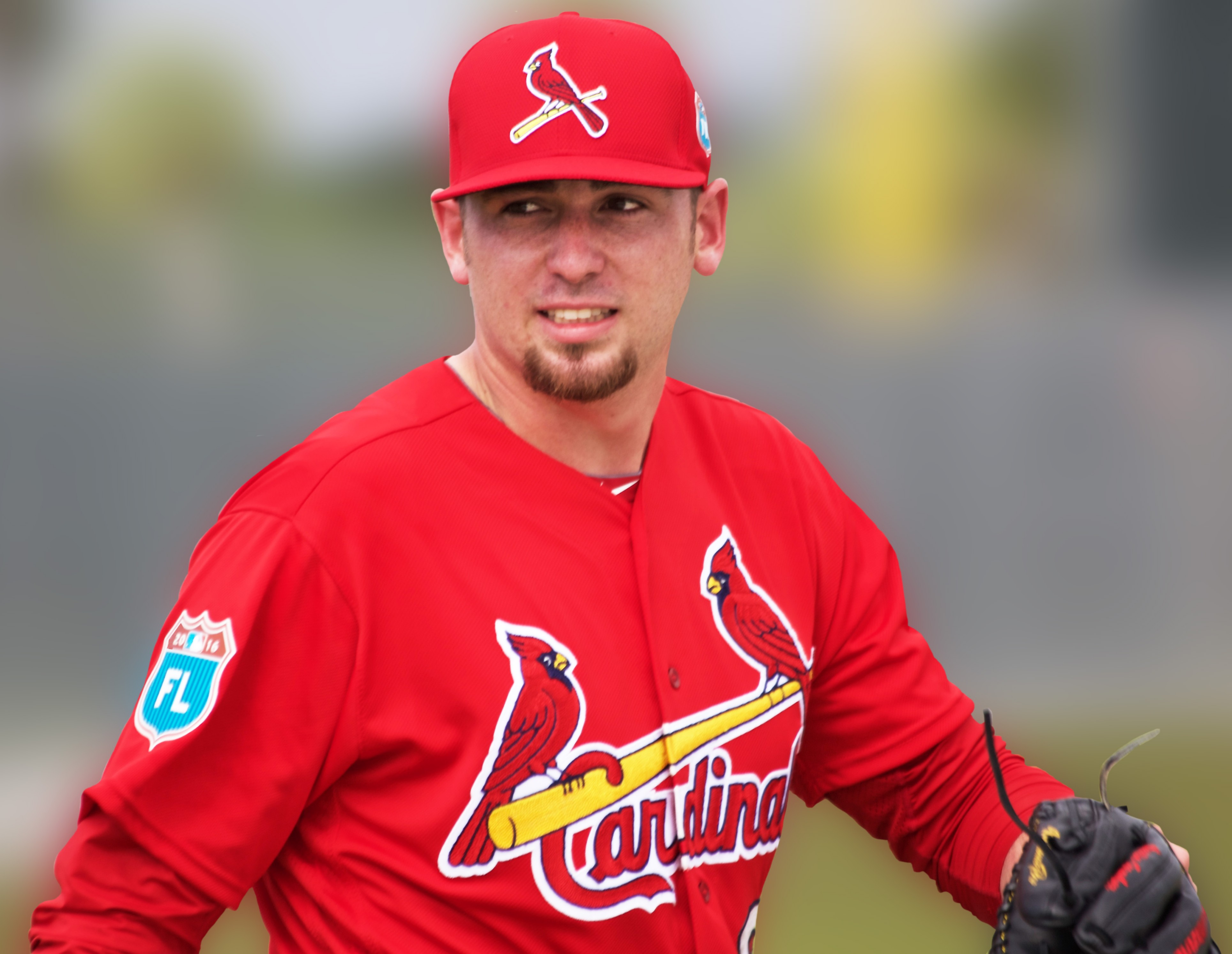
- Gomber with the St. Louis Cardinals in 2016

Free agent
- Pitcher
- Born: November 23, 1993 (age 32); Winter Garden, Florida, U.S.
- Bats: Left Throws: Left

MLB debut
- June 2, 2018, for the St. Louis Cardinals

MLB statistics (through 2025 season)
- Win–loss record: 35–47
- Earned run average: 5.08
- Strikeouts: 539
- Stats at Baseball Reference

Teams
- St. Louis Cardinals (2018–2020); Colorado Rockies (2021–2025)

Austin Zachary Gomber (born November 23, 1993) is an American professional baseball pitcher who is a free agent. He has previously played in Major League Baseball (MLB) for the St. Louis Cardinals and Colorado Rockies.

Gomber attended Florida Atlantic University, playing college baseball for the Owls, before St. Louis drafted him in the fourth round of the 2014 MLB draft. The Cardinals named him one of their two 2015 Co-Minor League Pitchers of the Year. He made his MLB debut in 2018. St. Louis traded him to the Rockies before the 2021 season as part of a package for Nolan Arenado. The Rockies released Gomber in 2025.

== Baseball career ==
=== Amateur career ===
Austin Gomber attended West Orange High School in Winter Garden, Florida. He was a first-team all-conference pitcher his junior season. He then enrolled at Florida Atlantic University, where he played college baseball for the Florida Atlantic Owls. Gomber played three seasons for the Owls, made 41 starts and registered a 3.27 earned run average (ERA) in 244 2/3 innings pitched (IP). He was an All-Sun Belt Conference pitcher his junior year, leading the conference with a 2.97 ERA. In 2013, he played collegiate summer baseball with the Bourne Braves of the Cape Cod Baseball League.

=== St. Louis Cardinals ===
The St. Louis Cardinals selected Gomber in the fourth round of the 2014 MLB draft and signed him with a $374,100 bonus. His first assignment was to the State College Spikes of the Low-A New York–Penn League, where he had a 2–2 record, 2.30 ERA, and 36 strikeouts in 11 games started.

In 2015, Gomber pitched for the Peoria Chiefs, where he was named a Midwest League All-Star. He finished the season with a 15–3 record and a 2.67 ERA, leading the league in wins, strikeouts (140) and batting average against (.198). At one point during the season, Gomber won 13 consecutive decisions. The Cardinals named him their Minor League Pitcher of the Month for August, and, along with Alex Reyes, their Co-Minor League Pitchers of the Year.

The Cardinals invited him to spring training as a non-roster player in 2016, where he pitched against FAU in an. He began 2016 with the Palm Beach Cardinals and was promoted to the Springfield Cardinals in July. By the end of July, he had started 19 games over classes A-Advanced and Double-A, allowing a 2.69 ERA and a 1.04 WHIP over 120 2/3 innings. He finished the season with a combined 7–8 record and a 2.69 ERA in 21 starts. After the season, the Cardinals assigned Gomber to the Glendale Desert Dogs of the Arizona Fall League (AFL). Gomber was one of the best pitchers in the AFL starting seven games with a 5–1 record and a 2.14 ERA.

Gomber spent 2017 with Springfield. After struggling during the first half of the season, he posted a 1.92 ERA in his last ten games with Springfield. He finished the season 10–7 with a 3.34 ERA and 1.17 WHIP in 26 starts, as he pitched 143 innings (fourth in the Texas League) and had 140 strikeouts (second) and gave up 61 walks (fifth) and 17 home runs (sixth). The Cardinals added him to their 40-man roster after the season to protect him from being chosen in the Rule 5 Draft.

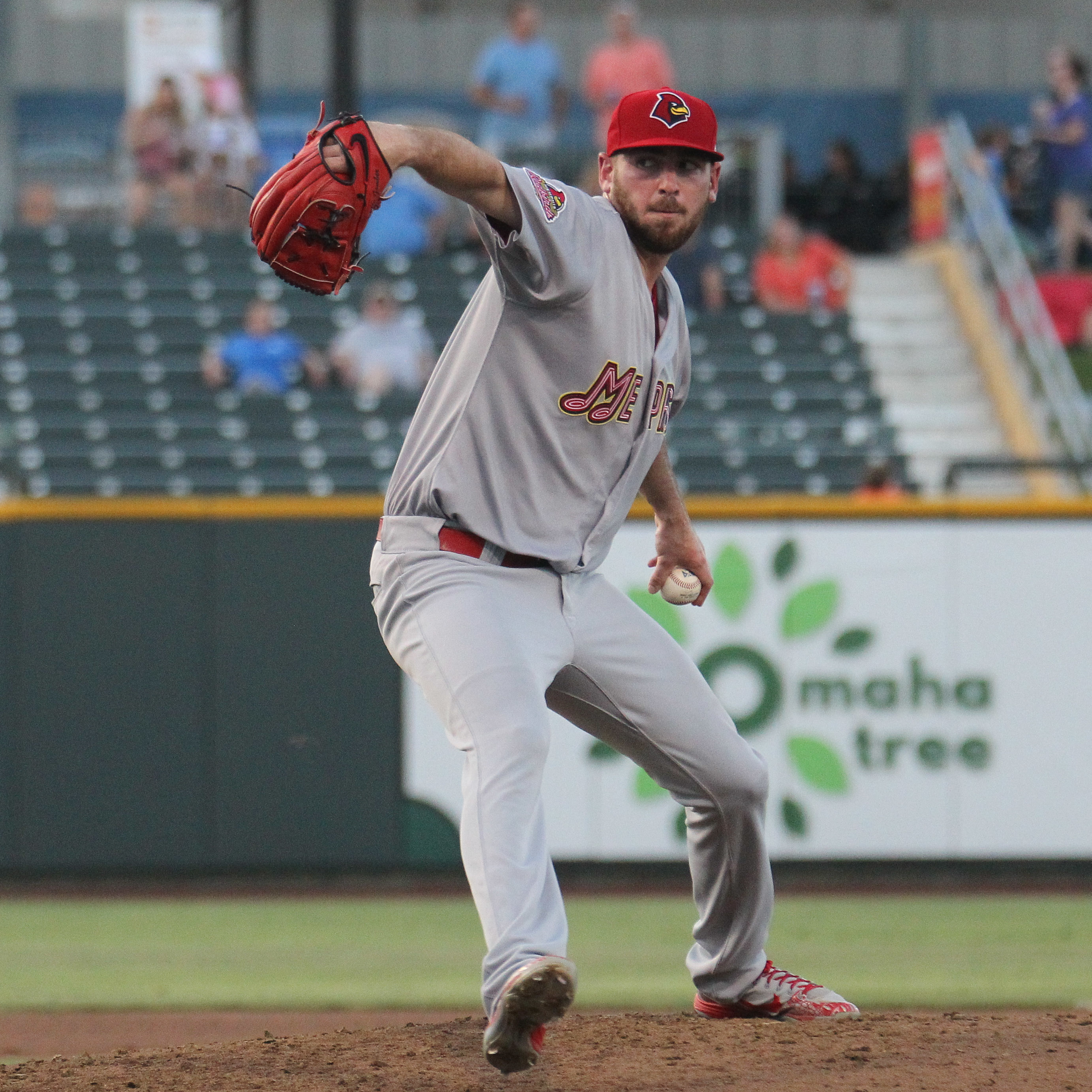
Gomber with the Memphis Redbirds in 2018

Gomber began 2018 with the Memphis Redbirds. On April 23, in a game against the Iowa Cubs, Gomber tied the Redbirds' franchise record for strikeouts in a game with 16, joining Lance Lynn, who also struck out 16 in 2010.

The Cardinals promoted Gomber from Memphis on April 29, to pitch in long relief. However, he did not make an appearance and was optioned back to Memphis on May 4. He was recalled once again on May 31 and made his major league debut on June 2, pitching three scoreless innings of relief against the Pittsburgh Pirates at Busch Stadium in a 3–2 walk-off win. He was optioned back to Memphis on July 6. He was recalled on July 24 to make his first major league start that night. In that start, Gomber threw six no-hit innings against the Cincinnati Reds before allowing a single to Joey Votto with one out in the seventh inning. He finished the year with St. Louis, compiling a 6–2 record with a 4.44 ERA and a 1.51 WHIP in 29 games (11 starts).

Gomber didn't pitch in the majors in 2019, missing three months of the season with biceps tendonitis. Prior to the injury, he was named the Pacific Coast League Pitcher of the Week after throwing a 7-inning complete game shutout on April 20.

During the pandemic-shortened 2020 season, Gomber appeared in 10 games (four starts) with the Cardinals, going 1–1 with a 1.86 ERA. In 29 innings pitched, he struck out 27 batters while walking 15.

=== Colorado Rockies ===
On February 1, 2021, Gomber was traded to the Colorado Rockies along with minor leaguers Elehuris Montero, Mateo Gil, Tony Locey, and Jake Sommers for Nolan Arenado. Gomber made 23 starts in 2021, with a 9–9 record, 4.53 ERA, and 113 strikeouts in 115 1/3 innings before his season was cut short due to a stress fracture in his lower back. In 2022, he split the season between starting and relieving, with a 5–7 record and 5.56 ERA in 124 2/3 innings.

Gomber did not issue a walk in a franchise-record 29 2/3 consecutive innings, a streak starting on June 30 and ending on July 31, 2023. On August 28, Gomber left a start against the Atlanta Braves as a result of back soreness. He placed on the injured list on September 8, and was later transferred to the 60-day injured list the same day with what was described as lower back inflammation, ending his season. In his third season with the Rockies, Gomber had a 9–9 record, 5.50 ERA, and 87 strikeouts in 139 innings across 27 starts.

In 2024, Gomber started 30 games with a 5–12 record, 4.75 ERA, and 116 strikeouts in 165 innings while tied for allowing the most home runs in the National League. He led the Rockies in innings pitched.

Gomber began the 2025 season on the injured list due to shoulder soreness. Following a rehab start with the Triple-A Albuquerque Isotopes, he was scratched from a scheduled second start due to inflammation in the same shoulder. On April 19, he was transferred to the 60-day injured list. He was activated on June 15. In 12 starts for Colorado, Gomber struggled to an 0–7 record, 7.49 ERA, and 34 strikeouts across 57 2/3 innings pitched. Gomber was released by the Rockies on August 22.

=== Chicago Cubs ===
On August 26, 2025, Gomber signed a minor league contract with the Chicago Cubs; he was subsequently assigned to the Triple-A Iowa Cubs. He made four appearances (three starts) for Iowa, with a 2–0 record and 0.47 ERA with 19 strikeouts over 19 innings of work. He elected free agency following the season on November 6.

=== Texas Rangers ===
On January 25, 2026, Gomber signed a minor league contract with the Texas Rangers. He began the regular season with the Triple–A Round Rock Express, pitching in nine contests and registering a 7.75 ERA with 29 strikeouts across 33 2/3 innings pitched. On May 16, Gomber was released by the Rangers organization.

=== Atlanta Braves ===
On May 16, 2026, Gomber signed a minor league contract with the Atlanta Braves. He pitched in 13 games with the Triple-A Gwinnett Stripers and had a 2-4 record, a 4.81 ERA, and 34 strikeouts over 48 2/3 innings. Gomber was released by the Braves on August 3.

=== Detroit Tigers ===
On August 5, 2026, Gomber signed a minor league contract with the Detroit Tigers. In 8 games (6 starts) with Triple-A Toledo Mud Hens he threw 32 innings going 0-1 with a 3.94 ERA and 21 strikeouts. He elected free agency on November 2.

== Pitching style ==
Gomber throws four pitches: a fastball, changeup, curveball and slider. His fastball can reach 90 miles per hour (140 km/h). In his pre-draft report, Jim Callis commented that Gomber's changeup was his best pitch.

== Personal life ==
Gomber married his wife on December 28, 2019. They had their first son in June 2019, their second son in August 2021, and their daughter in September 2024. They reside in Windermere, Florida.
