= Kodi Whitley =

American baseball player (born 1995)

Tampa Bay Rays
- Pitcher
- Born: February 21, 1995 (age 31); Clayton, North Carolina, U.S.
- Bats: Right Throws: Right

MLB debut
- July 26, 2020, for the St. Louis Cardinals

MLB statistics (through 2022 season)
- Win–loss record: 2–0
- Earned run average: 3.38
- Strikeouts: 44
- Stats at Baseball Reference

Teams
- St. Louis Cardinals (2020–2022)

Kodi James Whitley (born February 21, 1995) is an American professional baseball pitcher in the Tampa Bay Rays organization. He has previously played in Major League Baseball (MLB) for the St. Louis Cardinals.

== Amateur career ==
Whitley attended Cleveland High School outside of Clayton, North Carolina. In 2013, his senior year, he earned all-conference honors. Undrafted in the 2013 Major League Baseball draft, he enrolled at the University of Mount Olive in Mount Olive, North Carolina, where he played college baseball.

In 2014, Whitley's freshman year, he pitched to a 6–2 record with a 2.74 ERA over 13 games (ten starts), earning Conference Carolinas Freshman of the Year. That summer, he played in the Coastal Plain League for the Fayetteville SwampDogs. As a sophomore at Mount Olive in 2015, he appeared in 17 games (making 14 starts) in which he went 8–4 with a 4.41 ERA, striking out 88 batters over 87 2/3 innings. After the year, he returned to play in the Coastal Plain League with Fayetteville, earning All-Star honors. Prior to the 2016 season, Whitley underwent Tommy John surgery, forcing him to miss the year. In 2017, he pitched only five innings. After the year, he was drafted by the St. Louis Cardinals in the 27th round of the 2017 Major League Baseball draft.

== Professional career ==
=== St. Louis Cardinals ===
Whitley signed with St. Louis and made his professional debut with the Gulf Coast League Cardinals. He also appeared in one game for the Palm Beach Cardinals at the end of the season. Over 17 2/3 innings between both clubs, he compiled a 1.53 ERA and 22 strikeouts. In 2018, he pitched for the Peoria Chiefs, going 4–2 with a 2.51 ERA over 41 games (two starts), and in 2019, he began the year with Palm Beach before being promoted to the Springfield Cardinals in April and to the Memphis Redbirds in July. Over fifty relief appearances between the three clubs, Whitley went 3–4 with a 1.60 ERA, striking out 78 batters over 67 1/3 innings. He was selected to play in the Arizona Fall League for the Glendale Desert Dogs following the season.

On July 20, 2020, it was announced that Whitley had made the Cardinals 2020 Opening Day roster. He made his debut on July 26 at Busch Stadium against the Pittsburgh Pirates, facing three batters and retiring them all over one inning in relief. On August 4, it was announced that Whitley had tested positive for COVID-19, and he was subsequently placed on the injured list. He returned to the team on September 22. Over 4 2/3 innings with St. Louis, he compiled a 1.93 ERA with five strikeouts. In 2021, Whitley did not make the Opening Day roster. He was recalled on April 13, but optioned back to Memphis on April 17. On April 30, he was recalled again. On May 30, the Cardinals placed Whitley on the injured list with back spasms. He was activated on July 11 and optioned to Memphis. He was recalled to St. Louis on August 28 and spent the remainder of the season with them. Over 25 relief appearances with the Cardinals, Whitley compiled a 2.49 ERA and 27 strikeouts over 25 1/3 innings. He was removed from the 40-man roster and sent outright to Triple-A Memphis on November 1, 2022.

Whitley began the 2023 season back with Memphis, where he made 32 appearances and registered a 1–5 record and 5.19 ERA with 48 strikeouts and three saves in 43 1/3 innings pitched. He was released by the Cardinals organization on July 19.

=== Atlanta Braves ===
On July 24, 2023, Whitley signed a minor league contract with the Atlanta Braves. In 14 games for the Triple–A Gwinnett Stripers, he logged a 6.43 ERA with 10 strikeouts across 14 innings pitched. Whitley was released by the Braves organization on March 12, 2024.

=== Tampa Bay Rays ===
On February 18, 2025, Whitley signed a minor league contract with the Tampa Bay Rays. In 21 appearances split between the rookie-level Florida Complex League Rays, Double-A Montgomery Biscuits, and Triple-A Durham Bulls, he accumulated a 1–3 record and 4.08 ERA with 38 strikeouts and two saves across 28 2/3 innings pitched.

On October 16, 2025, Whitley re-signed with the Rays on a minor league contract for the 2026 season. He made 28 relief appearances between the FCL Rays, High-A Bowling Green Hot Rods, and Durham, and had a 1–3 record, a 2.81 ERA, and 31 strikeouts over 32 innings.

On November 3, 2026, Whitley re-signed with the Rays on a new minor league contract for the 2027 season.
