= Génesis Cabrera =

Dominican baseball player (born 1996)

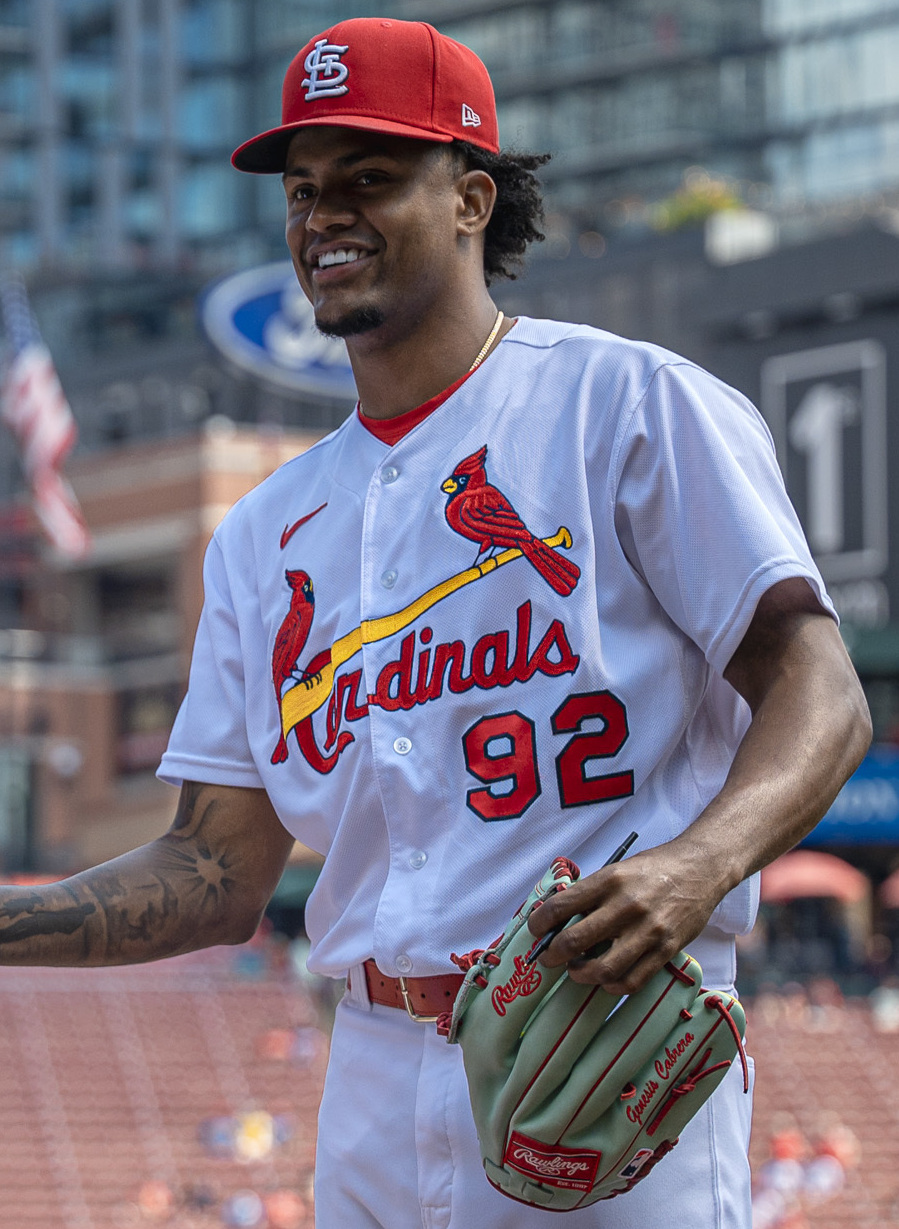
- Cabrera with the St. Louis Cardinals in 2022

Free agent
- Pitcher
- Born: October 10, 1996 (age 30); Santo Domingo, Dominican Republic
- Bats: Left Throws: Left

MLB debut
- May 29, 2019, for the St. Louis Cardinals

MLB statistics (through 2025 season)
- Win–loss record: 17–15
- Earned run average: 4.24
- Strikeouts: 303
- Stats at Baseball Reference

Teams
- St. Louis Cardinals (2019–2023); Toronto Blue Jays (2023–2024); New York Mets (2025); Chicago Cubs (2025); Pittsburgh Pirates (2025); Minnesota Twins (2025)

Génesis Cabrera (HEN-eh-sis; born October 10, 1996) is a Dominican professional baseball pitcher who is a free agent. He has previously played in Major League Baseball (MLB) for the St. Louis Cardinals, Toronto Blue Jays, New York Mets, Chicago Cubs, Pittsburgh Pirates, and Minnesota Twins.

== Career ==
=== Tampa Bay Rays ===
Cabrera signed with the Tampa Bay Rays as an international free agent in November 2013. He made his professional debut in 2014 with the Dominican Summer League Rays, going 2–1 with a 2.45 earned run average (ERA) in 29 1/3 innings pitched. In 2015, he played for the Princeton Rays where he pitched 17 innings.In 2016, he pitched with the Bowling Green Hot Rods and was named a Midwest League All-Star, going 11–5 with a 3.88 ERA in 23 games (22 starts). He spent 2017 with both the Charlotte Stone Crabs and the Montgomery Biscuits, compiling a combined 9–9 record and 3.22 ERA in 25 games (24 starts) between both teams. He began 2018 back with Montgomery, where he was named a Southern League All-Star.

=== St. Louis Cardinals ===
On July 31, 2018, the Rays traded Cabrera, Justin Williams, and Roel Ramírez to the St. Louis Cardinals for Tommy Pham. Cabrera was assigned to the Springfield Cardinals before being promoted to the Memphis Redbirds for the playoffs. In 27 games (25 starts) between Montgomery, Springfield, and Memphis, he went 8–9 with a 4.17 ERA and a 1.32 WHIP.

The Cardinals added Cabrera to their 40-man roster after the 2018 season. He began the 2019 season with Memphis. He was promoted to the major leagues for the first time on May 29, 2019. He made his debut that night in a start versus the Philadelphia Phillies, giving up five runs (three earned) over 3 2/3 innings, striking out five and walking two in an eventual 11–4 Cardinals loss. He made one more start before being re-assigned back to Memphis. He was recalled to St. Louis again on June 13 and optioned back to Memphis on June 24. He was recalled to St. Louis once again on August 31, finishing the season in the majors. Over 20 1/3 innings pitched with St. Louis during the regular season, Cabrera went 0–2 with a 4.87 ERA and 19 strikeouts.

In the shortened 2020 season, Cabrera recorded a 2.42 ERA with 32 strikeouts over 22 1/3 innings of work while raising his whiff rate from 18.1% in 2019 to 40.3%. In 2021, Cabrera emerged as a key member of the Cardinals' bullpen, appearing in 71 games in which he went 4–5 with a 3.73 ERA and 77 strikeouts over 70 innings.

Cabrera was suspended for one game following a benches-clearing incident half an inning after he hit J.D. Davis of the New York Mets with a pitch on April 27, 2022. Mets first baseman Pete Alonso publicly criticized Cabrera for his behavior during the ensuing conflict between the teams. Cabrera pitched in 31 games for the Cardinals in 2022, registering a 4-2 record and 4.63 ERA with 32 strikeouts in 44 2/3 innings of work.

Cabrera was optioned to Triple-A Memphis to begin the 2023 season. He made 32 appearances for St. Louis in 2023, posting a 5.06 ERA with 38 strikeouts in 32 innings of work. On July 18, 2023, Cabrera was designated for assignment following the signing of Ryan Tepera.

=== Toronto Blue Jays ===
On July 21, 2023, Cabrera was traded to the Toronto Blue Jays in exchange for minor league catcher Sammy Hernández. In 29 appearances down the stretch, he logged a 2.66 ERA with 20 strikeouts over 23 2/3 innings pitched. On March 31, 2024, Cabrera was suspended again, this time for three games, after shoving José Caballero of the Tampa Bay Rays. Cabrera made 69 appearances for Toronto in 2024, compiling a 3–3 record and 3.59 ERA with 50 strikeouts across 62 2/3 innings pitched. On November 4, he was removed from the 40–man roster and sent outright to the Triple–A Buffalo Bisons, but he rejected the assignment and elected free agency.

=== New York Mets ===
On November 27, 2024, Cabrera signed a minor league contract with the New York Mets. He began the 2025 season with the Triple-A Syracuse Mets, struggling to a 7.88 ERA with 12 strikeouts over seven games. On May 1, 2025, the Mets selected Cabrera's contract, adding him to their active roster. In six appearances for New York, he recorded a 3.52 ERA with seven strikeouts across 7 2/3 innings pitched. Cabrera was designated for assignment by the Mets on May 24. He cleared waivers and elected free agency on May 27.

=== Chicago Cubs ===
On May 29, 2025, Cabrera signed a major league contract with the Chicago Cubs. In nine appearances for Chicago, he recorded an 8.68 ERA with eight strikeouts across 9 1/3 innings pitched. On June 21, Cabrera was designated for assignment by the Cubs. He cleared waivers and elected free agency on June 24.

=== Pittsburgh Pirates ===
On June 26, 2025, Cabrera signed a major league contract with the Pittsburgh Pirates. In nine appearances for Pittsburgh, he recorded a 4.91 ERA with seven strikeouts over 11 innings of work. Cabrera was designated for assignment by the Pirates on August 4. He cleared waivers and elected free agency on August 7.

=== Minnesota Twins ===
On August 12, 2025, Cabrera signed a minor league contract with the Minnesota Twins. After one appearance for the Triple-A St. Paul Saints, the Twins added Cabrera to their active roster on August 17. In 16 appearances for the Twins, he struggled to an 0-1 record and 7.98 ERA with 13 strikeouts and one save across 14 2/3 innings pitched. On November 6, Cabrera was removed from the 40-man roster and sent outright to St. Paul; he subsequently rejected the assignment and elected free agency.

=== Philadelphia Phillies ===
On December 26, 2025, Cabrera signed a minor league contract with the Philadelphia Phillies. He made 15 appearances for the Triple-A Lehigh Valley IronPigs, but struggled to a 1-2 record and 10.38 ERA with 22 strikeouts across 17 1/3 innings pitched. On May 16, 2026, Cabrera was released by the Phillies organization.

=== Kansas City Royals ===
On May 22, 2026, Cabrera signed a minor league contract with the Kansas City Royals. He made 17 appearances for the Triple-A Omaha Storm Chasers, posting a 1–3 record with a 6.16 ERA and 18 strikeouts across 19 innings pitched. On July 17, Cabrera was released by the Royals organization to pursue an opportunity in the Mexican League.

=== Diablos Rojos del México ===
On July 17, 2026, Cabrera signed with the Diablos Rojos del México of the Mexican League. In five appearances (including one start), he surrendered nine earned runs across four innings pitched (20.25 ERA), while striking out five and walking five batters. On August 4, Cabrera was released by the Diablos.
