= Roel Ramírez =

American baseball player (born 1995)

San Diego Padres
- Pitcher
- Born: May 26, 1995 (age 31); Laredo, Texas, U.S.
- Bats: Right Throws: Right

MLB debut
- August 16, 2020, for the St. Louis Cardinals

MLB statistics (through 2021 season)
- Win–loss record: 0–0
- Earned run average: 81.00
- Strikeouts: 1
- Stats at Baseball Reference

Teams
- St. Louis Cardinals (2020–2021)
Medals
Men's baseball
Representing Mexico
World Baseball Classic
Bronze medal – third place	2023 Miami	Team

Roel Octavio Ramírez (born May 26, 1995) is an American professional baseball pitcher in the San Diego Padres organization. The Tampa Bay Rays selected him in the eighth round of the 2013 MLB draft. He has previously played in Major League Baseball (MLB) for the St. Louis Cardinals. He has played for the Mexico national baseball team.

== Career ==
=== Tampa Bay Rays ===
Ramírez attended United South High School in Laredo, Texas. The Tampa Bay Rays selected him in the eighth round, with the 248th overall selection, of the 2013 MLB draft. He made his professional debut with the GCL Rays, where he recorded a 3-4 record and 5.86 ERA in 12 games. In 2014, Ramírez played for the rookie-level Princeton Rays, logging a 6-2 record and 1.86 ERA in 12 appearances. The following season, Ramírez played for the Low-A Hudson Valley Renegades, where he pitched to a 4-3 record and 2.97 ERA with 43 strikeouts in 69.2 innings pitched. For the 2016 season, Ramírez played for the Single-A Bowling Green Hot Rods, registering a 7-8 record and 4.68 ERA in 25 appearances. He split the 2017 season between the High-A Charlotte Stone Crabs and Bowling Green, accumulating a 3-3 record and 5.29 ERA with 60 strikeouts in 64.2 innings of work. Ramírez began the 2018 season with Charlotte, later receiving a promotion to the Double-A Montgomery Biscuits, where he logged a 3-1 record and 3.32 ERA in 26 games.

=== St. Louis Cardinals ===
On July 31, 2018, the Rays traded Ramírez, Justin Williams, and Génesis Cabrera to the St. Louis Cardinals in exchange for Tommy Pham and international signing bonus money. He finished the year with the Double-A Springfield Cardinals, where he logged a 5.06 ERA in 10 games. Ramírez split the 2019 season between Springfield and the Triple-A Memphis Redbirds, pitching to a cumulative 6-3 record and 4.78 ERA with 85 strikeouts in 75.1 innings pitched.

On August 5, 2020, Ramírez was selected to the 40-man roster and promoted to the major leagues for the first time. He made his MLB debut on August 16 against the Chicago White Sox, giving up four consecutive home runs to the Chicago White Sox. He was the ninth pitcher since at least 1901 to allow 4+ home runs in his major league debut, and the only one of those to allow the four home runs consecutively. On September 21, Ramírez was designated for assignment by the Cardinals. He re-signed with the Cardinals organization on a minor league contract on November 2.

Ramírez was assigned to Triple-A Memphis to begin the 2021 season, where he posted a 4.67 ERA in 18 games. On June 28, 2021, Ramírez was selected to the active roster. Ramírez only appeared in 1 game for St. Louis, logging an 81.00 ERA, the same exact ERA he had posted the year previous.

=== New York Mets ===
On July 21, 2021, Ramírez was claimed off waivers by the New York Mets. Ramírez pitched in one game for the Triple-A Syracuse Mets, allowing 2 runs in an inning of work, before he was designated for assignment by the Mets on July 27. In 12 appearances for the Mets, Ramirez went 0-2 with a 8.31 ERA and 16 strikeouts. On October 4, Ramirez elected free agency.

=== Toros de Tijuana ===
On October 20, 2021, Ramírez signed with the Toros de Tijuana of the Mexican League. He made 16 appearances for Tijuana in 2022, posting a 1.17 ERA with 22 strikeouts in 15 1/3?innings pitched. Ramírez was released by the Toros on June 28, 2022.

=== Atlanta Braves ===
On July 6, 2022, Ramírez signed a minor league deal with the Atlanta Braves.

Ramírez split the 2023 season between the Triple–A Gwinnett Stripers and High–A Rome Braves. In 20 combined appearances, he struggled to a 6.20 ERA with 25 strikeouts in 24 2/3 innings pitched. On July 27, 2023, Ramírez was released by the Braves organization.

=== Pericos de Puebla ===
On August 1, 2023, Ramírez signed with the Pericos de Puebla of the Mexican League. In 3 appearances for team, he allowed two runs on five hits with four strikeouts in three innings of work. With Puebla, Ramírez won the Serie del Rey.

=== Toros de Tijuana (second stint) ===
On September 18, 2023, Ramírez was traded to the Toros de Tijuana of the Mexican League. In 41 appearances for Tijuana, he logged an 0–2 record and 5.17 ERA with 34 strikeouts and 14 saves across 38 1/3 innings pitched.

In 2025, Ramírez re-signed with Tijuana for a second consecutive season. In 40 relief appearances, he posted a 4–2 record with a 3.16 ERA and 26 strikeouts across 31 1/3 innings.

Ramírez returned to the Toros in 2026 for a third season. In 47 relief appearances, he went 4–1 with a stellar 1.76 ERA and 63 strikeouts in 46 innings pitched. He also led the league in holds (19) and helped the Toros win their third Serie del Rey.

=== San Diego Padres ===
On October 1, 2026, Ramírez signed a minor league contract with the San Diego Padres.
