= Seth Elledge =

American baseball player (born 1996)

- Pitcher
- Born: May 20, 1996 (age 30); Dallas, Texas, U.S.
- Batted: Right Threw: Right

MLB debut
- August 16, 2020, for the St. Louis Cardinals

Last MLB appearance
- June 27, 2021, for the St. Louis Cardinals

MLB statistics
- Win–loss record: 1–0
- Earned run average: 4.63
- Strikeouts: 25
- Stats at Baseball Reference

Teams
- St. Louis Cardinals (2020–2021)

Seth Wayne Elledge (born May 20, 1996) is an American former professional baseball pitcher. He played in Major League Baseball (MLB) for the St. Louis Cardinals. He was drafted by the Seattle Mariners in the fourth round of the 2017 MLB draft.

== Amateur career ==
Elledge attended Centennial High School in Frisco, Texas. As a senior, he compiled a 2.92 ERA. Undrafted out of high school in the 2014 Major League Baseball draft, he enrolled at Dallas Baptist University where he played college baseball. In 2016, he played collegiate summer baseball with the Falmouth Commodores of the Cape Cod Baseball League. In 2017, as a junior at Dallas Baptist, he was 2–1 with 2.59 ERA and 13 saves in 22 relief appearances.

== Professional career ==
=== Seattle Mariners ===
After Elledge's junior year, he was selected by the Seattle Mariners in the fourth round of the 2017 Major League Baseball draft.

Elledge signed with Seattle and made his professional debut with the Everett AquaSox of the Low-A Northwest League before being promoted to the Clinton LumberKings of the Single-A Midwest League. In 19 relief appearances between the two teams, he compiled a 3–0 record with a 3.24 ERA. He began the 2018 season with the Modesto Nuts of the High-A California League, and was named a California League All-Star.

=== St. Louis Cardinals ===
On July 27, 2018, Elledge was traded to the St. Louis Cardinals in exchange for Sam Tuivailala. He was assigned to the Springfield Cardinals of the Double-A Texas League and finished the season there. In 44 total relief appearances between Modesto and Springfield, he posted an 8–2 record with a 2.13 ERA, a 0.95 WHIP, and 13 saves. Elledge began 2019 back with Springfield and was promoted to the Memphis Redbirds of the Triple-A Pacific Coast League in June. Over 67 2/3 relief innings pitched between the two clubs, he went 6–4 with a 4.26 ERA, striking out 75. He was selected to play in the Arizona Fall League for the Glendale Desert Dogs following the season and earned All-Star honors.

On August 15, 2020, Elledge was promoted to the major leagues. He made his major league debut on August 16 against the Chicago White Sox. Over 11 2/3 innings pitched with St. Louis, he went 1–0 with a 4.63 ERA and 14 strikeouts.

For the 2021 season, Elledge pitched 11 2/3 innings in which he gave up six runs and struck out 11 batters for the Cardinals. He spent a majority of the season with Memphis, going 2–2 with a 6.56 ERA and 46 strikeouts over 35 2/3 innings. On October 6, 2021, the Cardinals designated him for assignment and he was outrighted to Memphis the following day. He was released on March 25, 2022.

=== Atlanta Braves ===
On March 28, 2022, Elledge signed a minor league contract with the Atlanta Braves organization. Elledge made 43 appearances for the Triple-A Gwinnett Stripers, recording a 1-5 record and 3.88 ERA with 63 strikeouts and three saves in 46 1/3 innings pitched.

On November 10, 2022, Elledge was selected to the 40-man roster. He was optioned to Triple-A Gwinnett to begin the 2023 season. On April 8, 2023, Elledge was designated for assignment by the Braves following the promotion of Danny Young.

=== New York Mets ===
On April 11, 2023, Elledge was claimed off waivers by the New York Mets and optioned to the Triple-A Syracuse Mets. In eight appearances for Syracuse, Elledge struggled to an 8.49 ERA with nine strikeouts in 11 2/3 innings of work. On May 14, he was designated for assignment following the promotion of Dennis Santana.

=== Detroit Tigers ===
On May 16, 2023, Elledge was claimed off waivers by the Detroit Tigers and optioned to Triple-A Toledo Mud Hens. In 10 games for Toledo, he posted a 3.86 ERA with 13 strikeouts across 14 innings pitched. He was designated for assignment by the Tigers following the waiver claim of Anthony Misiewicz on June 18. On June 23, Elledge cleared waivers and elected free agency in lieu of an outright assignment.

=== Atlanta Braves (second stint) ===
On June 27, 2023, Elledge signed a minor league contract to return to the Atlanta Braves organization. On July 19, Elledge was selected to the 40-man roster and promoted to the major leagues. He went unused out of the bullpen was optioned to the Triple–A Gwinnett Stripers on July 22 following the promotion of Allan Winans. The next day, Elledge was designated for assignment after Yonny Chirinos was claimed off waivers. He cleared waivers and was sent outright to Gwinnett on July 25. However, Elledge rejected the assignment and subsequently elected free agency. On July 27, Elledge re–signed with the Braves on a minor league contract. He made 25 appearances out of the bullpen for Triple–A Gwinnett, recording a 4.83 ERA with 36 strikeouts across 31 2/3 innings. Elledge elected free agency following the season on November 6.

=== Oakland Athletics ===
On May 3, 2024, Elledge signed a minor league contract with the Oakland Athletics. He made 34 appearances for the Double-A Midland RockHounds, posting a 3-3 record and 2.22 ERA with 34 strikeouts and 11 saves across 44 2/3 innings pitched. Elledge elected free agency following the season on November 4.

On April 27, 2025, Elledge announced his retirement from professional baseball via his personal Instagram account.
