= Rangel Ravelo =

Cuban baseball player (born 1992)

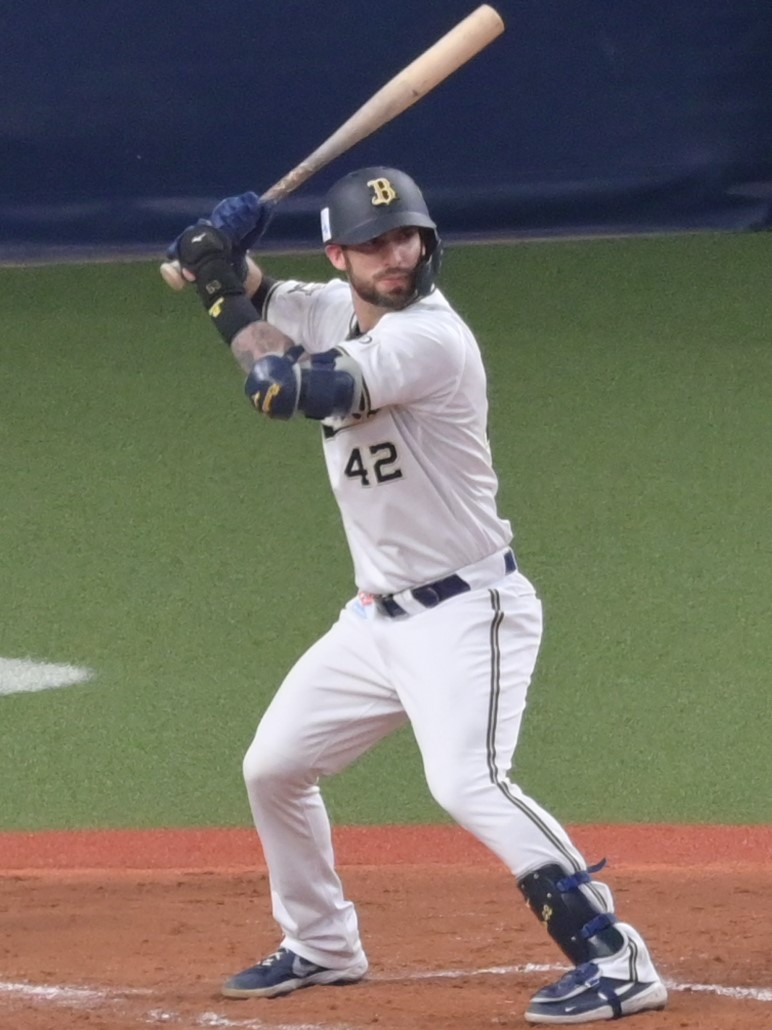
- Ravelo with the Orix Buffaloes in 2022

Conspiradores de Querétaro – No. 5
- First baseman / Outfielder
- Born: April 24, 1992 (age 34); Havana, Cuba
- Bats: Right Throws: Right

Professional debut
- MLB: June 17, 2019, for the St. Louis Cardinals
- NPB: October 21, 2021, for the Orix Buffaloes

MLB statistics (through 2020 season)
- Batting average: .189
- Home runs: 3
- Runs batted in: 13

NPB statistics (through 2022 season)
- Batting average: .169
- Home runs: 1
- Runs batted in: 2
- Stats at Baseball Reference

Teams
- St. Louis Cardinals (2019–2020); Orix Buffaloes (2021–2022)

Career highlights and awards
- Japan Series champion (2022)

Rangel Ravelo (born April 24, 1992) is a Cuban professional baseball first baseman and outfielder for the Conspiradores de Querétaro of the Mexican League. He has previously played in Major League Baseball (MLB) for the St. Louis Cardinals, and in Nippon Professional Baseball (NPB) for the Orix Buffaloes.

== Career ==
=== Chicago White Sox ===
Ravelo was drafted by the Chicago White Sox in the sixth round of the 2010 Major League Baseball draft out of Hialeah High School in Hialeah, Florida. He signed with the White Sox and made his professional debut with the Bristol White Sox. In 2011, he played for Bristol and Kannapolis Intimidators and also spent 2012 with Kannapolis. He returned to Kannapolis to start 2013 and was promoted to the Winston-Salem Dash early in the season. Ravelo played 2014 with the Double-A Birmingham Barons. During the season, he had a 26-game hitting streak. After the season, he was named the Barons Player of the Year after hitting .309 with a .859 on-base plus slugging (OPS) and 11 home runs.

=== Oakland Athletics ===
After the 2014 season, the White Sox traded Ravelo, Josh Phegley, Marcus Semien, and Chris Bassitt to the Oakland Athletics in exchange for Jeff Samardzija and Michael Ynoa. He played for three Athletics affiliates in 2015: the Arizona League Athletics, Double-A Midland RockHounds, and Triple-A Nashville Sounds. He spent the entire 2016 season with Nashville, finishing with a .262 batting average with 8 home runs and 54 RBI. He was designated for assignment and sent outright to Nashville after the season. The A's invited him to spring training in 2017 as a non-roster player. With no natural position to play at Triple-A, due to Matt Olson's full-time first base assignment, and being too advanced for Double-A, Ravelo was released before the start of the season.

=== St. Louis Cardinals ===
On April 7, 2017, Ravelo signed a minor league contract with the St. Louis Cardinals, and was assigned to the Memphis Redbirds, where he spent the whole season, posting a .314 batting average with eight home runs and 41 RBIs. in 89 games. He returned to Memphis in 2018, slashing .308/.392/.487 with 13 home runs and 67 RBIs in 100 games. He returned to Memphis to begin 2019. St. Louis promoted Ravelo to the major leagues on June 17, 2019. On September 5, 2019, Ravelo hit his first career Major League home run off of former Cardinals farmhand Kyle Barraclough in the 8th inning of a win against the San Francisco Giants. Over 39 regular season at-bats with St. Louis, Ravelo hit .205 with two home runs and seven RBIs. Over 95 games with Memphis, he slashed .299/.383/.473 with 12 home runs and 56 RBIs.

Ravelo began the 2020 season with St. Louis. On August 4, 2020, it was announced that he had tested positive for COVID-19. In 35 at-bats over 13 games for St. Louis in 2020, Ravelo slashed .189/.250/.351 with one home run and 6 RBI. On December 2, Ravelo was nontendered by the Cardinals. After the 2020 season, he played for Águilas Cibaeñas of the Dominican Professional Baseball League (LIDOM). He has also played for Dominican Republic in the 2021 Caribbean Series.

=== Los Angeles Dodgers ===
On January 9, 2021, Ravelo signed a minor league contract with the Los Angeles Dodgers organization. He was assigned to the Triple-A Oklahoma City Dodgers, where he slashed a torrid .407/.504/.758 with 8 home runs and 27 RBI in 26 games. On June 14, 2021, the Dodgers agreed to sell Ravelo's contract to a team in Nippon Professional Baseball (NPB) so Ravelo could pursue an opportunity in Japan.

=== Orix Buffaloes ===
On June 17, 2021, Ravelo signed with the Orix Buffaloes of Nippon Professional Baseball (NPB). He became a free agent after the 2022 season.

=== San Diego Padres ===
On February 8, 2023, Ravelo signed a minor league contract with the San Diego Padres with an invitation to spring training. He played in 59 games for the Triple–A El Paso Chihuahuas, hitting .310/.428/.473 with eight home runs and 35 RBI. Ravelo elected free agency following the season on November 6.

=== Seattle Mariners ===
On November 16, 2023, Ravelo signed a minor league contract with the Seattle Mariners. He made three appearances for the rookie–level Arizona Complex League Mariners before he was released on July 3, 2024.

=== Tecolotes de los Dos Laredos ===
On July 4, 2024, Ravelo signed with the Tecolotes de los Dos Laredos of the Mexican League. In 21 games for Dos Laredos, he batted .257/.380/.500 with five home runs and 15 RBI.

Ravelo played in nine games for Dos Laredos in 2025, going 8-for-31 (.258) with one home run, one RBI, and three walks. Ravelo was released by the Tecolotes on May 28, 2025.

=== Toros de Tijuana ===
On June 11, 2025, Ravelo signed with the Toros de Tijuana of the Mexican League. In 40 appearances for Tijuana, he batted .289/.409/.415 with four home runs, 16 RBI, and three stolen bases.

=== Conspiradores de Querétaro ===
On January 7, 2026, Ravelo was traded to El Águila de Veracruz of the Mexican League. On March 4, Ravelo and Esmil Rogers were traded to the Conspiradores de Querétaro of the Mexican League in exchange for Jhan Mariñez and Yairo Muñoz.
