= 2021 Colorado Rockies season =

2021 Colorado Rockies
- League: National League
- Division: West
- Ballpark: Coors Field
- City: Denver, Colorado
- Record: 74–87 (.460)
- Divisional place: 4th
- Owners: Charles & Richard Monfort
- General managers: Jeff Bridich, Bill Schmidt
- Manager: Bud Black
- Television: AT&T Sportsnet Rocky Mountain (Drew Goodman, Jeff Huson, Ryan Spilborghs)
- Radio: KOA (English) (Jack Corrigan, Jerry Schemmel); KNRV (Spanish) (Salvador Hernandez, Javier Olivas, Carlos Valdez)
- Stats: ESPN.com; Baseball Reference

The 2021 Colorado Rockies season was the franchise's 29th in Major League Baseball. It is their 27th season at Coors Field. Bud Black returned as the Manager for his fifth season in 2021. On April 5, 2021, MLB announced that Coors Field would host the 2021 MLB All-Star Game after it was announced that Truist Park in Atlanta, Georgia would not host it due to MLB's opposition on Georgia's new voting laws. On April 26, Rockies executive vice president/general manager Jeff Bridich resigned. The Rockies announced that executive vice president/chief operating officer Greg Feasel would serve as the team's president/chief operating officer for the remainder of the season, and that Bill Schmidt would serve as interim general manager.

The Rockies started the season with a 6–33 record on the road, which is the worst start on the road in the live-ball era. They split or lost 16 consecutive road series between September 2020 and July 2021, a new low for a team thought by writers to have had a disadvantage when playing in lower altitude when away from Coors Field since its inception.

== Offseason ==
=== Roster departures ===
On October 28, 2020, the Rockies declined the 2021 option on Daniel Murphy's contract, and Drew Butera, Matt Kemp, Chris Owings, Kevin Pillar, and A. J. Ramos declared free agency. On November 20, 2020, Ashton Goudeau and Jesús Tinoco were designated for assignment. On December 2, 2020, the Rockies non-tendered outfielder David Dahl, pitcher Chi Chi Gonzalez, and catcher Tony Wolters. Gonzalez was re-signed to a minor league contract on December 11, 2020. Owings was re-signed to a minor league contract on January 20, 2021. Owings was added to the Rockies' 40–man roster on March 20, 2020. Jairo Díaz was designated for assignment on April 1, 2021 to make room for Jhoulys Chacín ahead of Opening Day.

=== Free agent signings ===
The Rockies signed pitcher Dereck Rodríguez to a minor league deal with an invitation to spring training on November 9, 2020. On November 13, 2020, the Rockies signed catcher José Briceño to a minor league deal with an invitation to spring training. Pitcher Brian Gonzalez was also signed to a minor league deal with an invite. Outfielder Connor Joe was signed to a minor league deal with an invite to spring training on November 20, 2020. On February 11, 2021, the Rockies signed infielder Greg Bird to a minor league deal with an invitation to spring training. Infielder C. J. Cron was signed to a minor league deal with an invite to spring training on February 15, 2021. Cron was added to the 40–man roster on March 20, 2021. On April 1, 2021, the Rockies signed Jhoulys Chacín to a major league contract ahead of their first game on Opening Day.

=== Trades ===
On November 25, 2020, the Rockies traded pitcher Jeff Hoffman and minor league pitcher Case Williams to the Cincinnati Reds for pitcher Robert Stephenson and minor league outfielder Jameson Hannah. On December 3, 2020, the Rockies traded minor league infielder Christian Koss to the Boston Red Sox for minor league pitcher Yoan Aybar. On February 1, 2021, the Rockies traded infielder Nolan Arenado and cash considerations to the St. Louis Cardinals for pitcher Austin Gomber, minor league infielder Elehuris Montero, minor league infielder Mateo Gil, minor league pitcher Tony Locey, and minor league pitcher Jake Sommers.

=== Rule 5 Draft ===
In the 2020 Rule 5 draft, the Rockies selected pitcher Jordan Sheffield from the Los Angeles Dodgers with the 7th pick. No Rockies players were selected in the major league phase of the draft.

Off-season 40-man roster moves

Departing Player	Date	Transaction	New Team	Arriving player	Old team	Date	Transaction
Daniel Murphy	October 28, 2020	Option Declined	Retired	Colton Welker	Hartford Yard Goats	November 20, 2020	Added to 40-man roster
Drew Butera	October 28, 2020	Free agent	Texas Rangers	Helcris Olivarez	Grand Junction Rockies	November 20, 2020	Added to 40-man roster
Matt Kemp	October 28, 2020	Free agent	TBD	Lucas Gilbreath	Lancaster JetHawks	November 20, 2020	Added to 40-man roster
Kevin Pillar	October 28, 2020	Free agent	New York Mets	Bret Boswell	Hartford Yard Goats	November 20, 2020	Added to 40-man roster
A. J. Ramos	October 28, 2020	Free agent	Los Angeles Angels	Robert Stephenson	Cincinnati Reds	November 25, 2020	Trade
Ashton Goudeau	November 20, 2020	Designated for assignment	Pittsburgh Pirates	Yoan Aybar	Boston Red Sox	December 3, 2020	Trade
Jesús Tinoco	November 20, 2020	Designated for assignment	Albuquerque Isotopes	Jordan Sheffield	Los Angeles Dodgers	December 10, 2020	Rule 5 Draft
Jeff Hoffman	November 25, 2020	Trade	Cincinnati Reds	Austin Gomber	St. Louis Cardinals	February 1, 2021	Trade
David Dahl	December 2, 2020	Non–tendered	Texas Rangers	Elehuris Montero	St. Louis Cardinals	February 1, 2021	Trade
Chi Chi Gonzalez	December 2, 2020	Non–tendered	Colorado Rockies	C. J. Cron	Detroit Tigers	March 20, 2020	Added to 40-man roster
Tony Wolters	December 2, 2020	Non–tendered	Pittsburgh Pirates	Jhoulys Chacín	Atlanta Braves	April 1, 2021	Free agent
Nolan Arenado	February 1, 2021	Trade	St. Louis Cardinals				
Peter Lambert	March 20, 2021	60-day IL	Colorado Rockies				
Jairo Díaz	April 1, 2021	Designated for Assignment	Albuquerque Isotopes				

== Regular season ==
=== Season standings ===
==== National League West ====
NL West
Team	W	L	Pct.	GB	Home	Road
San Francisco Giants	107	55	.660	—	54‍–‍27	53‍–‍28
Los Angeles Dodgers	106	56	.654	1	58‍–‍23	48‍–‍33
San Diego Padres	79	83	.488	28	45‍–‍36	34‍–‍47
Colorado Rockies	74	87	.460	32½	48‍–‍33	26‍–‍54
Arizona Diamondbacks	52	110	.321	55	32‍–‍49	20‍–‍61

==== National League Wild Card ====
Division leaders
Team	W	L	Pct.
San Francisco Giants	107	55	.660
Milwaukee Brewers	95	67	.586
Atlanta Braves	88	73	.547

Wild Card teams (Top 2 teams qualify for postseason)
Team	W	L	Pct.	GB
Los Angeles Dodgers	106	56	.654	+16
St. Louis Cardinals	90	72	.556	—
Cincinnati Reds	83	79	.512	7
Philadelphia Phillies	82	80	.506	8
San Diego Padres	79	83	.488	11
New York Mets	77	85	.475	13
Colorado Rockies	74	87	.460	15½
Chicago Cubs	71	91	.438	19
Miami Marlins	67	95	.414	23
Washington Nationals	65	97	.401	25
Pittsburgh Pirates	61	101	.377	29
Arizona Diamondbacks	52	110	.321	38

=== Record vs. opponents ===
2021 National League record Source: MLB Standings Grid – 2021
Team	AZ	ATL	CHC	CIN	COL	LAD	MIA	MIL	NYM	PHI	PIT	SD	SF	STL	WSH	AL
Arizona	—	3–4	2–4	5–1	9–10	3–16	2–5	1–6	1–5	4–3	4–2	8–11	2–17	1–6	3–4	4–16
Atlanta	4–3	—	5–2	4–3	2–4	2–4	11–8	3–3	10–9	10–9	4–3	4–2	3–3	6–1	14–5	6–14
Chicago	4–2	2–5	—	8–11	3–3	4–3	1–5	4–15	4–3	2–5	14–5	5–1	1–6	9–10	4–3	6–14
Cincinnati	1–5	3–4	11–8	—	5–2	3–3	5–2	9–10	3–3	4–2	13–6	1–6	1–6	10–9	5–2	9–11
Colorado	10–9	4–2	3–3	2–5	—	6–13	4–2	2–5	2–5	5–2	4–2	11–8	4–15	3–4	4–2	10–10
Los Angeles	16–3	4–2	3–4	3–3	13–6	—	3–4	4–3	6–1	4–2	6–0	12–7	9–10	4–3	7–0	12–8
Miami	5–2	8–11	5–1	2–5	2–4	4–3	—	3–3	9–10	10–9	2–5	3–4	3–4	0–6	8–11	3–17
Milwaukee	6–1	3–3	15–4	10–9	5–2	3–4	3–3	—	4–2	2–5	14–5	5–2	4–3	8–11	5–1	8–12
New York	5–1	9–10	3–4	3–3	5–2	1–6	10–9	2–4	—	9–10	3–4	4–3	1–5	2–5	11–8	9–11
Philadelphia	3–4	9–10	5–2	2–4	2–5	2–4	9–10	5–2	10–9	—	4–3	4–2	2–4	4–3	13–6	8–12
Pittsburgh	2–4	3–4	5–14	6–13	2–4	0–6	5–2	5–14	4–3	3–4	—	3–4	4–3	7–12	2–4	10–10
San Diego	11–8	2–4	1–5	6–1	8–11	7–12	4–3	2–5	3–4	2–4	4–3	—	8–11	3–3	4–3	14–6
San Francisco	17–2	3–3	6–1	6–1	15–4	10–9	4–3	3–4	5–1	4–2	3–4	11–8	—	2–4	5–2	13–7
St. Louis	6–1	1–6	10–9	9–10	4–3	3–4	6–0	11–8	5–2	3–4	12–7	3–3	4–2	—	2–4	11–9
Washington	4–3	5–14	3–4	2–5	2–4	0–7	11–8	1–5	8–11	6–13	4–2	3–4	2–5	4–2	—	10–10

=== Game log ===
2021 game log: 74–87 (Home: 48–33; Away: 26–54)
April: 9–17 (Home: 8–7; Away: 1–10)

#	Date	Opponent	Score	Win	Loss	Save	Attendance	Record	Streak
1	April 1	Dodgers	8–5	**Gonzalez** (1–0)	Kershaw (0–1)	**Bard** (1)	20,570	1–0	W1
2	April 2	Dodgers	6–11	Bauer (1–0)	**Senzatela** (0–1)	—	20,363	1–1	L1
3	April 3	Dodgers	5–6	Treinen (1–0)	**Givens** (0–1)	Jansen (1)	20,688	1–2	L2
4	April 4	Dodgers	2–4	Urías (1–0)	**Gomber** (0–1)	Knebel (1)	20,368	1–3	L3
5	April 6	Diamondbacks	8–10 (13)	Peacock (1–0)	**Bowden** (0–1)	—	10,240	1–4	L4
6	April 7	Diamondbacks	8–0	**Senzatela** (1–1)	Bumgarner (0–1)	—	12,894	2–4	W1
7	April 8	Diamondbacks	7–3	**Gray** (1–0)	Kelly (0–2)	**Bard** (2)	10,836	3–4	W2
8	April 9	@ Giants	1–3	Cueto (1–0)	**Gomber** (0–2)	McGee (3)	7,390	3–5	L1
9	April 10	@ Giants	3–4	Baragar (2–0)	**Bowden** (0–2)	—	6,176	3–6	L2
10	April 11	@ Giants	0–4	DeSclafani (1–0)	**Márquez** (0–1)	—	6,560	3–7	L3
11	April 13	@ Dodgers	0–7	Bauer (2–0)	**Senzatela** (1–2)	—	15,021	3–8	L4
12	April 14	@ Dodgers	2–4	Knebel (1–0)	**Gray** (1–1)	Jansen (3)	15,093	3–9	L5
13	April 15	@ Dodgers	5–7	Nelson (1–1)	**Almonte** (0–1)	Price (1)	15,129	3–10	L6
—	April 16	Mets	Postponed (Snow, Makeup April 17)						
14	April 17 (1)	Mets	3–4 (7)	deGrom (1–1)	**Bard** (0–1)	Díaz (1)	N/A	3–11	L7
15	April 17 (2)	Mets	7–2 (7)	**Márquez** (1–1)	Lucchesi (0–1)	—	13,906	4–11	W1
16	April 18	Mets	1–2	Stroman (3–0)	**Senzatela** (1–3)	Díaz (2)	15,082	4–12	L1
17	April 20	Astros	6–2	**Gray** (2–1)	García (0–1)	—	10,144	5–12	W1
18	April 21	Astros	6–3	**Gomber** (1–2)	Urquidy (0–2)	—	7,120	6–12	W2
19	April 23	Phillies	5–4	**Givens** (1–1)	Neris (1–2)	—	14,025	7–12	W3
20	April 24	Phillies	5–7	Nola (2–1)	**Chacín** (0–1)	Neris (3)	20,214	7–13	L1
21	April 25	Phillies	12–2	**Gray** (3–1)	Anderson (0–3)	—	20,244	8–13	W1
22	April 26	@ Giants	0–12	DeSclafani (2–0)	**Gomber** (1–3)	—	4,129	8–14	L1
23	April 27	@ Giants	7–5 (10)	**Bard** (1–1)	Santos (0–2)	**Estévez** (1)	5,595	9–14	W1
24	April 28	@ Giants	3–7	Wood (3–0)	**Márquez** (1–2)	—	6,163	9–15	L1
25	April 29	@ Diamondbacks	3–5	Smith (2–1)	**Stephenson** (0–1)	Crichton (3)	6,843	9–16	L2
26	April 30	@ Diamondbacks	2–7	Bumgarner (3–2)	**Gray** (3–2)	—	13,184	9–17	L3

May: 11–17 (Home: 8–5; Away: 3–12)

#	Date	Opponent	Score	Win	Loss	Save	Attendance	Record	Streak
27	May 1	@ Diamondbacks	14–6	**Gomber** (2–3)	Gallen (1–1)	—	15,734	10–17	W1
28	May 2	@ Diamondbacks	4–8	Devenski (1–0)	**Bard** (1–2)	—	11,395	10–18	L1
—	May 3	Giants	PPD, RAIN; rescheduled for May 4						
29	May 4 (1)	Giants	4–12 (7)	Wisler (1–2)	**Márquez** (1–3)	—	10,213	10–19	L2
30	May 4 (2)	Giants	8–6 (7)	**Bowden** (1–2)	Doval (0–1)	—	10,213	11–19	W1
31	May 5	Giants	6–5	**Gray** (4–2)	Webb (1–3)	**Bard** (3)	9,521	12–19	W2
32	May 7	@ Cardinals	0–5	Flaherty (6–0)	**Gomber** (2–4)	—	13,435	12–20	L1
33	May 8	@ Cardinals	8–9	Martínez (3–4)	**Gonzalez** (1–1)	Reyes (10)	13,390	12–21	L2
34	May 9	@ Cardinals	0–2	Wainwright (2–3)	**Márquez** (1–4)	Helsley (1)	13,380	12–22	L3
—	May 10	Padres	PPD, RAIN; rescheduled for May 12						
35	May 11	Padres	1–8	Díaz (1–0)	**Senzatela** (1–4)	—	8,825	12–23	L4
36	May 12 (1)	Padres	3–5 (7)	Pagán (3–0)	**Gray** (4–3)	Melancon (12)	N/A	12–24	L5
37	May 12 (2)	Padres	3–2 (8)	**Almonte** (1–1)	Ramirez (0–1)	—	11,968	13–24	W1
38	May 13	Reds	13–8	**Gonzalez** (2–1)	Castillo (1–5)	—	13,647	14–24	W2
39	May 14	Reds	9–6	**Márquez** (2–4)	Miley (4–3)	**Bard** (4)	20,232	15–24	W3
40	May 15	Reds	5–6 (12)	Sims (3–1)	**Santos** (0–1)	Hembree (1)	20,136	15–25	L1
41	May 16	Reds	6–7	Doolittle (3–0)	**Givens** (1–2)	Antone (2)	15,541	15–26	L2
42	May 17	@ Padres	0–7	Darvish (4–1)	**Gray** (4–4)	—	15,250	15–27	L3
43	May 18	@ Padres	1–2 (10)	Johnson (1–1)	**Bard** (1–3)	—	15,250	15–28	L4
44	May 19	@ Padres	0–3	Musgrove (4–4)	**Gonzalez** (2–2)	Melancon (15)	15,250	15–29	L5
45	May 21	Diamondbacks	7–1	**Márquez** (3–4)	Frankoff (0–1)	—	18,158	16–29	W1
46	May 22	Diamondbacks	7–6	**Kinley** (1–0)	Bumgarner (4–4)	**Bard** (5)	20,183	17–29	W2
47	May 23	Diamondbacks	4–3	**Bard** (2–3)	Crichton (0–3)	—	19,221	18–29	W3
48	May 24	@ Mets	3–2	**Gomber** (3–4)	Peterson (1–4)	**Estévez** (2)	8,438	19–29	W4
49	May 25	@ Mets	1–3	Castro (1–1)	**Gonzalez** (2–3)	Díaz (8)	9,190	19–30	L1
—	May 26	@ Mets	PPD, RAIN; rescheduled for May 27						
50	May 27 (1)	@ Mets	0–1 (7)	Stroman (4–4)	**Márquez** (3–5)	Díaz (9)	N/A	19–31	L2
51	May 27 (2)	@ Mets	2–4 (7)	Loup (2–0)	**Senzatela** (1–5)	Barnes (2)	9,569	19–32	L3
—	May 28	@ Pirates	PPD, RAIN; rescheduled for May 29						
52	May 29 (1)	@ Pirates	0–7 (7)	Brubaker (4–4)	**Gray** (4–5)	—	5,279	19–33	L4
53	May 29 (2)	@ Pirates	0–4 (7)	Keller (3–6)	**Gomber** (3–5)	—	7,183	19–34	L5
54	May 30	@ Pirates	4–3	**Bard** (3–3)	Rodríguez (3–1)	—	7,917	20–34	W1

June: 14–13 (Home: 12–4; Away: 2–9)

#	Date	Opponent	Score	Win	Loss	Save	Attendance	Record	Streak
55	June 1	Rangers	3–2 (11)	**Givens** (2–2)	Martin (0–2)	—	18,028	21–34	W2
56	June 2	Rangers	6–3	**Senzatela** (2–5)	Evans (0–1)	**Bard** (6)	19,289	22–34	W3
57	June 3	Rangers	11–6	**Gomber** (4–5)	Foltynewicz (1–6)	—	19,150	23–34	W4
58	June 4	Athletics	5–9	Montas (6–5)	**Gray** (4–6)	—	26,790	23–35	L1
59	June 5	Athletics	3–6	Irvin (4–7)	**Freeland** (0–1)	Trivino (8)	27,459	23–36	L1
60	June 6	Athletics	3–1	**Márquez** (4–5)	Kaprielian (2–1)	**Bard** (7)	23,716	24–36	W1
61	June 8	@ Marlins	2–6	López (2–3)	**Senzatela** (2–6)	—	4,863	24–37	L1
62	June 9	@ Marlins	4–3	**Gomber** (5–5)	Garrett (0–1)	**Bard** (8)	4,563	25–37	W1
63	June 10	@ Marlins	4–11	Rogers (7–3)	**Gonzalez** (2–4)	—	4,965	25–38	L1
64	June 11	@ Reds	5–11	Mahle (6–2)	**Freeland** (0–2)	—	20,505	25–39	L2
65	June 12	@ Reds	3–10	Miley (6–4)	**Márquez** (4–6)	—	23,765	25–40	L3
66	June 13	@ Reds	2–6	Hendrix (3–1)	**Senzatela** (2–7)	—	18,268	25–41	L4
67	June 14	Padres	3–2	**Gomber** (6–5)	Lamet (1–2)	**Bard** (9)	23,027	26–41	W1
68	June 15	Padres	8–4	**Estévez** (1–0)	Hill (3–3)	—	22,871	27–41	W2
69	June 16	Padres	8–7	**Estévez** (2–0)	Adams (2–1)	—	18,798	28–41	W3
70	June 17	Brewers	7–3	**Márquez** (5–6)	Woodruff (5–3)	—	22,756	29–41	W4
71	June 18	Brewers	6–5 (10)	**Chacín** (1–1)	Williams (2–1)	—	27,117	30–41	W5
72	June 19	Brewers	5–6	Richards (2–0)	**Kinley** (1–1)	Hader (18)	34,198	30–42	L1
73	June 20	Brewers	6–7	Williams (3–1)	**Bard** (3–4)	Boxberger (3)	34,224	30–43	L2
74	June 22	@ Mariners	1–2	Sewald (4–2)	**Kinley** (1–2)	Graveman (6)	12,879	30–44	L3
75	June 23	@ Mariners	5–2	**Márquez** (6–6)	Sheffield (5–7)	**Bard** (10)	11,141	31–44	W1
76	June 25	@ Brewers	4–5 (11)	Williams (4–1)	**Gilbreath** (0–1)	—	31,140	31–45	L1
77	June 26	@ Brewers	4–10	Boxberger (3–2)	**Estévez** (2–1)	—	32,573	31–46	L2
78	June 27	@ Brewers	0–5	Lauer (2–3)	**Gonzalez** (2–5)	—	25,016	31–47	L3
79	June 28	Pirates	2–0	**Freeland** (1–2)	Anderson (3–8)	**Bard** (11)	32,092	32–47	W1
80	June 29	Pirates	8–0	**Márquez** (7–6)	De Jong (0–3)	—	27,915	33–47	W2
81	June 30	Pirates	6–2	**Gray** (5–6)	Kuhl (2–5)	—	20,270	34–47	W3

July: 12–12 (Home: 5–4; Away: 7–8)

#	Date	Opponent	Score	Win	Loss	Save	Attendance	Record	Streak
82	July 1	Cardinals	5–2	**Bard** (4–4)	Gallegos (5–2)	—	30,410	35–47	W4
83	July 2	Cardinals	3–9 (10)	Reyes (5–2)	**Almonte** (1–2)	—	47,224	35–48	L1
84	July 3	Cardinals	3–2	**Chacín** (2–1)	Cabrera (1–3)	**Bard** (12)	48,182	36–48	W1
85	July 4	Cardinals	3–2	**Lawrence** (1–0)	Reyes (5–3)	—	36,891	37–48	W2
86	July 6	@ Diamondbacks	3–4	Soria (1–3)	**Bard** (4–5)	—	6,847	37–49	L1
87	July 7	@ Diamondbacks	4–6	Peacock (3–6)	**Senzatela** (2–8)	Soria (2)	7,852	37–50	L2
88	July 8	@ Diamondbacks	9–3	**Gonzalez** (3–5)	Weems (0–1)	—	7,740	38–50	W1
89	July 9	@ Padres	2–4	Díaz (3–1)	**Freeland** (1–3)	Melancon (27)	34,953	38–51	L1
90	July 10	@ Padres	3–0	**Márquez** (8–6)	Musgrove (5–7)	**Bard** (13)	42,351	39–51	W1
91	July 11	@ Padres	3–1	**Gray** (6–6)	Stammen (3–2)	**Bard** (14)	38,235	40–51	W2
**91st All-Star Game in Denver, Colorado**
92	July 16	Dodgers	4–10	Urías (12–3)	**Gonzalez** (3–6)	—	44,251	40–52	L1
93	July 17	Dodgers	2–9	Buehler (10–1)	**Freeland** (1–4)	—	48,245	40–53	L2
94	July 18	Dodgers	6–5 (10)	**Givens** (3–2)	Bickford (0–1)	—	35,513	41–53	W1
95	July 20	Mariners	4–6	Gonzales (2–5)	**Márquez** (8–7)	Graveman (9)	30,715	41–54	L1
96	July 21	Mariners	6–3	**Gomber** (7–5)	Middleton (0–1)	**Bard** (15)	25,053	42–54	W1
97	July 23	@ Dodgers	9–6 (10)	**Bard** (5–5)	Sherfy (2–1)	**Gilbreath** (1)	43,730	43–54	W2
98	July 24	@ Dodgers	0–1	Gonsolin (2–1)	**Freeland** (1–5)	Jansen (22)	42,245	43–55	L1
99	July 25	@ Dodgers	2–3	Bickford (1–1)	**Estévez** (2–2)	Kelly (1)	42,621	43–56	L2
100	July 26	@ Angels	2–6	Ohtani (5–1)	**Márquez** (8–8)	Iglesias (22)	22,751	43–57	L3
101	July 27	@ Angels	12–3	**Gomber** (8–5)	Suárez (4–4)	—	16,115	44–57	W1
102	July 28	@ Angels	7–8	Iglesias (7–4)	**Estévez** (2–3)	—	16,365	44–58	L1
103	July 29	@ Padres	0–3	Musgrove (7–7)	**Freeland** (1–6)	Melancon (32)	31,884	44–59	L2
104	July 30	@ Padres	9–4	**Gray** (7–6)	Weathers (4–3)	—	38,686	45–59	W1
105	July 31	@ Padres	5–3	**Márquez** (9–8)	Darvish (7–6)	**Bard** (16)	44,144	46–59	W2

August: 14–13 (Home: 10–2; Away: 4–11)

#	Date	Opponent	Score	Win	Loss	Save	Attendance	Record	Streak
106	August 1	@ Padres	1–8	Stammen (5–2)	**Gomber** (8–6)	—	36,247	46–60	L1
107	August 3	Cubs	13–6	**Freeland** (2–6)	Davies (6–8)	—	38,188	47–60	W1
108	August 4	Cubs	2–3	Mills (5–4)	**Gray** (7–7)	Rodríguez (1)	36,205	47–61	L1
109	August 5	Cubs	6–5	**Kinley** (2–2)	Jewell (0–1)	**Bard** (17)	30,462	48–61	W1
110	August 6	Marlins	14–2	**Márquez** (10–8)	Alcántara (6–10)	—	28,281	49–61	W2
111	August 7	Marlins	7–4	**Gomber** (9–6)	Luzardo (3–5)	**Bard** (18)	39,986	50–61	W3
112	August 8	Marlins	13–8	**Freeland** (3–6)	Hess (2–2)	—	34,677	51–61	W4
113	August 10	@ Astros	0–5	Odorizzi (5–6)	**Gray** (7–8)	—	28,931	51–62	L1
114	August 11	@ Astros	1–5	Valdez (8–3)	**Senzatela** (2–9)	—	22,200	51–63	L2
115	August 12	@ Giants	0–7	Webb (6–3)	**Márquez** (10–9)	—	24,295	51–64	L3
116	August 13	@ Giants	4–5	DeSclafani (11–5)	**Gomber** (9–7)	Littell (2)	36,126	51–65	L4
117	August 14	@ Giants	4–1	**Freeland** (4–6)	Leone (2–2)	**Bard** (19)	32,282	52–65	W1
118	August 15	@ Giants	2–5	Wood (10–3)	**Gray** (7–9)	McGee (25)	33,337	52–66	L1
119	August 16	Padres	6–5	**Bard** (6–5)	Hudson (4–2)	—	24,565	53–66	W1
120	August 17	Padres	7–3	**Márquez** (11–9)	Strahm (0–1)	—	28,139	54–66	W2
121	August 18	Padres	7–5	**Bowden** (2–2)	Arrieta (5–12)	**Bard** (20)	20,692	55–66	W3
122	August 20	Diamondbacks	9–4	**Stephenson** (1–1)	de Geus (2–2)	—	30,243	56–66	W4
123	August 21	Diamondbacks	5–2	**Bard** (7–5)	Wendelken (2–2)	—	32,699	57–66	W5
124	August 22	Diamondbacks	4–8	Widener (2–1)	**Gray** (7–10)	—	24,552	57–67	L1
125	August 23	@ Cubs	4–6	Rodríguez (2–2)	**Bard** (7–6)	—	25,577	57–68	L2
—	August 24	@ Cubs	Postponed (Rain, Makeup August 25)						
126	August 25 (1)	@ Cubs	2–5 (7)	Heuer (5–2)	**Gomber** (9–8)	Morgan (1)	24,161	57–69	L3
127	August 25 (2)	@ Cubs	13–10 (10)	**Bowden** (3–2)	Jewell (0–2)	—	24,936	58–69	W1
128	August 27	@ Dodgers	4–2	**Freeland** (5–6)	Jackson (0–1)	**Estévez** (3)	40,100	59–69	W2
129	August 28	@ Dodgers	2–5	Treinen (4–5)	**Bard** (7–7)	Jansen (29)	42,479	59–70	L1
130	August 29	@ Dodgers	5–0	**Senzatela** (3–9)	White (1–2)	—	37,569	60–70	W1
131	August 30	@ Rangers	3–4	Alexy (1–0)	**Márquez** (11–10)	Barlow (3)	14,990	60–71	L1
132	August 31	@ Rangers	3–4	Lyles (7–11)	**Gomber** (9–9)	Patton (2)	18,383	60–72	L2

September: 13–13 (Home: 5–11; Away: 8–2)

#	Date	Opponent	Score	Win	Loss	Save	Attendance	Record	Streak
133	September 1	@ Rangers	9–5	**Chacín** (3–1)	Barlow (0–2)	—	14,747	61–72	W1
134	September 2	Braves	5–6	Webb (2–2)	**Almonte** (1–3)	Smith (30)	21,481	61–73	L1
135	September 3	Braves	4–3	**Senzatela** (4–9)	Ynoa (4–5)	**Estévez** (4)	24,371	62–73	W1
136	September 4	Braves	7–6	**Kinley** (3–2)	Minter (2–5)	**Estévez** (5)	35,351	63–73	W2
137	September 5	Braves	2–9	Morton (13–5)	**Feltner** (0–1)	—	33,957	63–74	L1
138	September 6	Giants	5–10	Gausman (13–5)	**Freeland** (5–7)	—	27,967	63–75	L2
139	September 7	Giants	3–12	Webb (9–3)	**Gonzalez** (3–7)	—	24,387	63–76	L3
140	September 8	Giants	4–7	Rogers (6–1)	**Estévez** (2–4)	McGee (30)	20,358	63–77	L4
141	September 9	@ Phillies	4–3	**Gilbreath** (1–1)	Kennedy (1–1)	**Estévez** (6)	18,071	64–77	W1
142	September 10	@ Phillies	11–2	**Márquez** (12–10)	Falter (2–1)	—	22,138	65–77	W2
143	September 11	@ Phillies	1–6	Wheeler (13–9)	**Freeland** (5–8)	—	23,232	65–78	L1
144	September 12	@ Phillies	5–4	**Goudeau** (1–0)	Neris (2–6)	**Estévez** (7)	24,099	66–78	W1
145	September 14	@ Braves	5–4	**Gray** (8–10)	Toussaint (3–3)	**Estévez** (8)	22,579	67–78	W2
146	September 15	@ Braves	3–2 (10)	**Estévez** (3–4)	Minter (2–6)	**Stephenson** (1)	21,382	68–78	W3
—	September 16	@ Braves	Cancelled (Rain)						
147	September 17	@ Nationals	9–8	**Gilbreath** (2–1)	Finnegan (5–8)	**Estévez** (9)	21,195	69–78	W4
148	September 18	@ Nationals	6–0	**Freeland** (6–8)	Corbin (8–15)	—	29,315	70–78	W5
149	September 19	@ Nationals	0–3	Espino (5–5)	**Gray** (8–11)	Finnegan (10)	26,303	70–79	L1
150	September 21	Dodgers	4–5 (10)	Jansen (3–4)	**Chacín** (3–2)	Vesia (1)	23,869	70–80	L2
151	September 22	Dodgers	10–5	**Stephenson** (2–1)	Bruihl (0–1)	—	27,013	71–80	W1
152	September 23	Dodgers	5–7 (10)	Jansen (4–4)	**Gilbreath** (2–2)	Treinen (6)	22,356	71–81	L1
153	September 24	Giants	2–7	Castro (1–0)	**Goudeau** (1–1)	—	41,613	71–82	L2
154	September 25	Giants	2–7	Watson (7–4)	**Gray** (8–12)	—	45,063	71–83	L3
155	September 26	Giants	2–6	Doval (5–1)	**Bard** (7–8)	—	31,043	71–84	L4
156	September 27	Nationals	4–5	Gray (2–2)	**Márquez** (12–11)	Rainey (3)	20,388	71–85	L5
157	September 28	Nationals	3–1	**Freeland** (7–8)	Corbin (9–16)	**Estévez** (10)	21,693	72–85	W1
158	September 29	Nationals	10–5	**Goudeau** (2–1)	Thompson (1–3)	—	20,613	73–85	W2

October: 1–2 (Home: 0–0; Away: 1–2)

#	Date	Opponent	Score	Win	Loss	Save	Attendance	Record	Streak
159	October 1	@ Diamondbacks	9–7	**Gilbreath** (3–2)	Wendelken (3–3)	**Estévez** (11)	15,189	74–85	W3
160	October 2	@ Diamondbacks	2–11	Gallen (4–10)	**Senzatela** (4–10)	—	19,418	74–86	L1
161	October 3	@ Diamondbacks	4–5	Wendelken (4–3)	**Estévez** (3–5)	—	12,565	74–87	L2

Legend: = Win = Loss = Postponement
Bold = Rockies team member

== Roster ==
2021 Colorado Rockies
Roster
Pitchers: 62 Yency Almonte; 52 Daniel Bard; 51 Ben Bowden; 38 Ryan Castellani; 43 Jhoulys Chacín; 54 Carlos Estévez; 18 Ryan Feltner; 30 Julián Fernández; 21 Kyle Freeland; 58 Lucas Gilbreath; 60 Mychal Givens; 26 Austin Gomber; 50 Chi Chi Gonzalez; 60 Ashton Goudeau; 55 Jon Gray; 40 Tyler Kinley; 23 Peter Lambert; 61 Justin Lawrence; 48 Germán Márquez; 63 Zac Rosscup; 46 Antonio Santos; 49 Antonio Senzatela; 34 Jordan Sheffield; 29 Robert Stephenson; 32 Jesús Tinoco	Catchers: 35 Elías Díaz; 3 Dom Núñez; Infielders: 18 Matt Adams; 25 C. J. Cron; 8 Josh Fuentes; 24 Ryan McMahon; 18 Taylor Motter; 7 Brendan Rodgers; 14 Rio Ruiz; 27 Trevor Story; 13 Alan Trejo; 4 Colton Welker	Outfielders: 19 Charlie Blackmon; 2 Yonathan Daza; 1 Garrett Hampson; 22 Sam Hilliard; 9 Connor Joe; 12 Chris Owings; 15 Raimel Tapia; 31 Ryan Vilade	Manager: 10 Bud Black; Coaches: 39 Stu Cole (third base); 75 Kyle Cunningham (asst. bullpen catcher); 0 Tim Doherty (major league coach); 36 Steve Foster (pitching); 53 Ronnie Gideon (first base); 16 Dave Magadan (hitting); 77 Aaron Muñoz (bullpen catcher); 11 Mike Redmond (bench); 41 Jeff Salazar (assistant hitting); 14 Darryl Scott (bullpen)

== Statistics ==
=== Batting ===
List does not include pitchers. Stats in bold are the team leaders.

Note: G = Games played; AB = At bats; R = Runs; H = Hits; 2B = Doubles; 3B = Triples; HR = Home runs; RBI = Runs batted in; BB = Walks; SO = Strikeouts; AVG = Batting average; OBP = On-base percentage; SLG = Slugging percentage; OPS = On-base percentage + slugging

Player	G	AB	R	H	2B	3B	HR	RBI	BB	SO	AVG	OBP	SLG	OPS
Ryan McMahon	**151**	**528**	80	134	32	1	23	86	59	**147**	.254	.331	.449	.779
Trevor Story	142	526	**88**	132	**34**	5	24	75	53	139	.251	.329	.471	.801
Charlie Blackmon	150	514	76	**139**	25	4	13	78	54	91	.270	.351	.411	.761
Raimel Tapia	133	487	69	133	26	2	6	50	40	70	.273	.327	.372	.699
C. J. Cron	142	470	70	132	31	1	**28**	**92**	**60**	117	**.281**	**.375**	**.530**	**.905**
Garrett Hampson	147	453	69	106	21	**6**	11	33	33	118	.234	.289	.380	.669
Brendan Rodgers	102	387	49	110	21	3	15	51	19	84	.284	.328	.470	.798
Elías Díaz	106	338	52	83	18	1	18	44	30	60	.246	.310	.464	.774
Yonathan Daza	107	301	26	85	12	2	2	30	21	60	.282	.332	.355	.688
Joshua Fuentes	95	271	30	61	11	1	7	33	12	65	.225	.257	.351	.608
Dom Núñez	81	228	31	43	12	3	10	33	34	91	.189	.293	.399	.692
Sam Hilliard	81	214	32	46	7	2	14	34	23	87	.215	.294	.463	.757
Connor Joe	63	179	23	51	9	0	8	35	26	41	.285	.379	.469	.848
Alan Trejo	28	46	7	10	2	0	1	3	3	15	.217	.260	.326	.586
Chris Owings	21	43	9	14	4	3	1	5	7	15	.326	.420	.628	1.048
Colton Welker	19	37	7	7	1	0	0	2	3	11	.189	.250	.216	.466
Matt Adams	22	36	3	6	1	0	0	2	4	9	.167	.250	.194	.444
Rio Ruiz	30	35	1	6	1	0	0	4	3	9	.171	.225	.200	.425
Taylor Motter	13	20	2	3	0	0	0	0	2	6	.150	.227	.150	.377
Ryan Vilade	3	6	0	0	0	0	0	0	1	1	.000	.143	.000	.143
Non-Pitcher Totals	161	5119	724	1301	268	34	181	690	487	1236	.254	.324	.426	.750
**Team totals**	**161**	**5374**	**739**	**1338**	**275**	**34**	**182**	**709**	**491**	**1356**	**.249**	**.317**	**.414**	**.731**

=== Pitching ===
List does not include position players. Stats in bold are the team leaders.

Note: W = Wins; L = Losses; ERA = Earned run average; G = Games pitched; GS = Games started; SV = Saves; IP = Innings pitched; H = Hits allowed; R = Runs allowed; ER = Earned runs allowed; BB = Walks allowed; K = Strikeouts

Player	W	L	ERA	G	GS	SV	IP	H	R	ER	BB	K
Germán Márquez	**12**	11	**4.40**	32	**32**	0	**180.0**	165	**92**	**88**	**64**	**176**
Antonio Senzatela	4	10	4.42	28	28	0	156.2	**178**	84	77	32	105
Jon Gray	8	**12**	4.59	29	29	0	149.0	140	83	76	58	157
Kyle Freeland	7	8	4.33	23	23	0	120.2	133	59	58	38	105
Austin Gomber	9	9	4.53	23	23	0	115.1	102	64	58	41	113
Chi Chi Gonzalez	3	7	6.46	24	18	0	101.2	127	74	73	28	56
Tyler Kinley	3	2	4.73	**70**	0	0	70.1	59	37	37	26	68
Daniel Bard	7	8	5.21	67	0	**20**	65.2	69	41	38	36	80
Jhoulys Chacín	3	2	4.34	46	1	0	64.1	53	32	31	28	47
Carlos Estévez	3	5	4.38	64	0	11	61.2	71	32	30	21	60
Yency Almonte	1	3	7.55	48	0	0	47.2	47	42	40	29	47
Robert Stephenson	2	1	3.13	49	0	1	46.0	42	20	16	18	52
Lucas Gilbreath	3	2	3.38	47	1	1	42.2	33	18	16	23	44
Ben Bowden	3	2	6.56	39	0	0	35.2	44	30	26	21	42
Mychal Givens	3	2	2.73	31	0	0	29.2	25	11	9	14	34
Jordan Sheffield	0	0	3.38	30	0	0	29.1	19	11	11	13	20
Ashton Goudeau	2	1	4.26	11	1	0	25.1	16	12	12	8	17
Justin Lawrence	1	0	8.64	19	0	0	16.2	21	16	16	19	17
Antonio Santos	0	1	4.76	7	0	0	11.1	9	7	6	5	10
Julián Fernández	0	0	10.80	6	0	0	6.2	9	8	8	4	4
Ryan Feltner	0	1	11.37	2	2	0	6.1	9	8	8	5	6
Peter Lambert	0	0	11.12	2	2	0	5.2	12	7	7	2	3
Ryan Castellani	0	0	5.40	1	1	0	3.1	5	2	2	4	2
Zac Rosscup	0	0	3.00	4	0	0	3.0	3	1	1	1	4
Jesús Tinoco	0	0	33.75	1	0	0	1.1	5	5	5	3	0
**Team totals**	**74**	**87**	**4.82**	**161**	**161**	**33**	**1397.0**	**1397**	**796**	**748**	**539**	**1269**

== Farm system ==
Level	Team	League	Manager
Triple-A	Albuquerque Isotopes	Triple-A West	Warren Schaeffer
Double-A	Hartford Yard Goats	Double-A Northeast	Chris Denorfia
High-A	Spokane Indians	High-A West	Scott Little
Low-A	Fresno Grizzlies	Low-A West	Robinson Cancel
Rookie	ACL Rockies	Arizona Complex League	Jake Optiz
Rookie	DSL Rockies	Dominican Summer League	Mauricio Gonzalez

Records
Preceded by 2020	Colorado Rockies seasons 2021	Succeeded by 2022
