= 2022 Colorado Rockies season =

2022 Colorado Rockies
- League: National League
- Division: West
- Ballpark: Coors Field
- City: Denver, Colorado
- Record: 68–94 (.420)
- Divisional place: 5th
- Owners: Charles & Richard Monfort
- President: Greg Feasel
- General manager: Bill Schmidt
- Manager: Bud Black
- Television: AT&T Sportsnet Rocky Mountain (Drew Goodman, Jeff Huson, Ryan Spilborghs)
- Radio: KOA (English) (Jack Corrigan, Jerry Schemmel); KNRV (Spanish) (Salvador Hernandez, Javier Olivas, Carlos Valdez)
- Stats: ESPN.com; Baseball Reference

The 2022 Colorado Rockies season was the 30th in Major League Baseball. It was their 28th season at Coors Field. Manager Bud Black returned for his sixth season with the Rockies in 2022.

On December 2, 2021, Commissioner of Baseball Rob Manfred announced a lockout of players, following expiration of the collective bargaining agreement (CBA) between the league and the Major League Baseball Players Association (MLBPA). On March 10, 2022, MLB and the MLBPA agreed to a new collective bargaining agreement, thus ending the lockout. Opening Day was played on April 7. Although MLB previously announced that several series would be cancelled due to the lockout, the agreement provides for a 162-game season, with originally canceled games to be made up via doubleheaders.

== Offseason ==
=== Lockout ===
The expiration of the league's collective bargaining agreement (CBA) with the Major League Baseball Players Association occurred on December 1, 2021 with no new agreement in place. As a result, the team owners voted unanimously to lockout the players stopping all free agency and trades.

The parties came to an agreement on a new CBA on March 10, 2022.

=== Rule changes ===
Pursuant to the new CBA, several new rules were instituted for the 2022 season. The National League will adopt the designated hitter full-time, a draft lottery will be implemented, the postseason will expand from ten teams to twelve, and advertising patches will appear on player uniforms and helmets for the first time.

=== Front office changes ===
On October 2, 2021, the Rockies named Bill Schmidt general manager, removing the interim from his job title.

=== Roster departures ===
On October 21, 2021, the Rockies designated for assignment Chi Chi Gonzalez, Yency Almonte, Tommy Doyle, Joshua Fuentes, and Rio Ruiz. Gonzalez, Almonte, Fuentes, and Ruiz elected free agency, while Doyle was outrighted to the Albuquerque Isotopes. On November 3, 2021, Trevor Story, Jon Gray, Jhoulys Chacín, and Chris Owings elected free agency. On November 13, 2021, Chacín signed with the Rockies on a one-year contract. On November 17, 2021, Story rejected a $18.4 million qualifying offer from the Rockies.

=== Free agent signings ===
On December 15, 2022, the Rockies signed infielders Kyle Holder and Tim Lopes to minor league contracts. On February 1, 2022, the Rockies signed catcher Carlos Pérez to a minor league contract. The Rockies signed pitcher Zach Lee to a minor league contract on February 9, 2022. The club signed pitchers Ty Blach and J. D. Hammer to minor league contracts on March 13, 2022, along with outfielder Scott Schebler. These players were invited to the major league camp in spring training as non-roster invitees. On March 16, 2022, the Rockies announced the signing of infielder José Iglesias and pitcher Chad Kuhl to 1-year major league contracts. One day later, the signing of pitcher Álex Colomé to a 1-year major league contract was announced. On March 18, 2022, the Rockies announced the signing of Kris Bryant to a 7-year, $182 million deal.

=== Trades ===
On March 24, the Rockies traded outfielder Raimel Tapia and minor league infielder Adrian Pinto to the Toronto Blue Jays for outfielder Randal Grichuk.

Off-season 40-man roster moves

Departing Player	Date	Transaction	New Team	Arriving player	Old team	Date	Transaction
Chi Chi Gonzalez	October 21, 2021	Designated for Assignment	Minnesota Twins	Noah Davis	Spokane Indians	November 19, 2021	Added to 40-man roster
Yency Almonte	October 21, 2021	Designated for Assignment	Los Angeles Dodgers	Ryan Rolison	Albuquerque Isotopes	November 19, 2021	Added to 40-man roster
Tommy Doyle	October 21, 2021	Designated for Assignment	Albuquerque Isotopes	Ezequiel Tovar	Spokane Indians	November 19, 2021	Added to 40-man roster
Joshua Fuentes	October 21, 2021	Designated for Assignment	Toronto Blue Jays	José Iglesias	Boston Red Sox	March 16, 2022	Free Agency
Rio Ruiz	October 21, 2021	Designated for Assignment	LG Twins	Chad Kuhl	Pittsburgh Pirates	March 16, 2022	Free Agency
Trevor Story	November 3, 2021	Free Agency	Boston Red Sox	Álex Colomé	Minnesota Twins	March 17, 2022	Free Agency
Jon Gray	November 3, 2021	Free Agency	Texas Rangers	Kris Bryant	San Francisco Giants	March 18, 2022	Free Agency
Chris Owings	November 3, 2021	Free Agency	Baltimore Orioles	Randal Grichuk	Toronto Blue Jays	March 24, 2022	Trade
Yoan Aybar	March 18, 2022	Designated for Assignment	New York Yankees				
Raimel Tapia	March 24, 2022	Trade	Toronto Blue Jays				

== Spring training ==
When the lockout ended, the Rockies began spring training at Salt River Fields at Talking Stick on March 13, 2022. The Rockies played 20 games in the Cactus League.

Spring Training non-roster invitees

Player	Position	2021 team(s)
Ty Blach	Pitcher	Baltimore Orioles (minors)
Bret Boswell	Infielder	Hartford Yard Goats
Nate Griep	Pitcher	Albuquerque Isotopes
J. D. Hammer	Pitcher	Philadelphia Phillies
Kyle Holder	Shortstop	New York Yankees (minors)
Zach Lee	Pitcher	Cincinnati Reds (minors)
Tim Lopes	Infielder	Milwaukee Brewers
Carlos Pérez	Catcher	Oakland Athletics (minors)
Scott Schebler	Outfielder	Los Angeles Angels
Brian Serven	Catcher	Albuquerque Isotopes

== Results and standings ==
=== National League West ===
NL West
Team	W	L	Pct.	GB	Home	Road
Los Angeles Dodgers	111	51	.685	—	57‍–‍24	54‍–‍27
San Diego Padres	89	73	.549	22	44‍–‍37	45‍–‍36
San Francisco Giants	81	81	.500	30	44‍–‍37	37‍–‍44
Arizona Diamondbacks	74	88	.457	37	40‍–‍41	34‍–‍47
Colorado Rockies	68	94	.420	43	41‍–‍40	27‍–‍54

=== National League Wild Card ===
Division leaders
Team	W	L	Pct.
Los Angeles Dodgers	111	51	.685
Atlanta Braves	101	61	.623
St. Louis Cardinals	93	69	.574

Wild Card teams (Top 3 teams qualify for postseason)
Team	W	L	Pct.	GB
New York Mets	101	61	.623	+14
San Diego Padres	89	73	.549	+2
Philadelphia Phillies	87	75	.537	—
Milwaukee Brewers	86	76	.531	1
San Francisco Giants	81	81	.500	6
Arizona Diamondbacks	74	88	.457	13
Chicago Cubs	74	88	.457	13
Miami Marlins	69	93	.426	18
Colorado Rockies	68	94	.420	19
Pittsburgh Pirates	62	100	.383	25
Cincinnati Reds	62	100	.383	25
Washington Nationals	55	107	.340	32

=== Record vs. opponents ===
2022 National League record Source: MLB Standings Grid – 2022
Team	AZ	ATL	CHC	CIN	COL	LAD	MIA	MIL	NYM	PHI	PIT	SD	SF	STL	WSH	AL
Arizona	—	2–4	4–3	3–4	9–10	5–14	5–1	4–3	2–4	3–3	4–3	5–14	10–9	2–5	4–3	12–8
Atlanta	4–2	—	3–3	4–3	6–1	2–4	13–6	3–3	10–9	11–8	7–0	3–4	4–3	4–3	14–5	13–7
Chicago	3–4	3–3	—	11–8	3–4	0–7	4–2	10–9	4–3	6–0	10–9	2–5	2–5	6–13	4–2	6–14
Cincinnati	4–3	3–4	8–11	—	2–4	0–7	4–3	6–13	1–5	1–6	7–12	0–6	4–2	7–12	3–4	12–8
Colorado	10–9	1–6	4–3	4–2	—	8–11	2–4	3–4	2–5	2–5	3–3	10–9	5–14	2–4	3–4	9–11
Los Angeles	14–5	4–2	7–0	7–0	11–8	—	6–1	4–3	3–4	3–4	1–5	14–5	15–4	4–2	3–3	15–5
Miami	1–5	6–13	2–4	3–4	4–2	1–6	—	4–3	6–13	7–12	4–3	3–4	3–4	2–4	15–4	8–12
Milwaukee	3–4	3–3	9–10	13–6	4–3	3–4	3–4	—	2–4	2–4	11–8	3–4	3–4	9–10	3–3	15–5
New York	4–2	9–10	3–4	5–1	5–2	4–3	13–6	4–2	—	14–5	6–1	2–4	4–3	5–2	14–5	9–11
Philadelphia	3–3	8–11	0–6	6–1	5–2	4–3	12–7	4–2	5–14	—	6–1	4–3	1–5	4–3	16–3	9–11
Pittsburgh	3–4	0–7	9–10	12–7	3–3	5–1	3–4	8–11	1–6	1–6	—	2–4	1–5	6–13	4–3	4–16
San Diego	14–5	4–3	5–2	6–0	9–10	5–14	4–3	4–3	4–2	3–4	4–2	—	13–6	2–4	4–3	8–12
San Francisco	9–10	3–4	5–2	2–4	14–5	4–15	4–3	4–3	3–4	5–1	5–1	6–13	—	3–4	4–2	10–10
St. Louis	5–2	3–4	13–6	12–7	4–2	2–4	4–2	10–9	2–5	3–4	13–6	4–2	4–3	—	4–3	10–10
Washington	3–4	5–14	2–4	4–3	4–3	3–3	4–15	3–3	5–14	3–16	3–4	3–4	2–4	3–4	—	8–12

Updated with the results of all games through October 5, 2022.

=== Game log ===
2022 game log: 68–94 (Home: 41–40; Away: 27–54)
April: 12–9 (Home: 8–4; Away: 4–5)

#	Date	Opponent	Score	Win	Loss	Save	Stadium	Attendance	Record	Streak
1	April 8	Dodgers	3–5	Buehler (1–0)	**Freeland** (0–1)	Kimbrel (1)	**Coors Field**	48,627	0–1	L1
2	April 9	Dodgers	3–2	**Estévez** (1–0)	Treinen (0–1)	**Bard** (1)	**Coors Field**	48,087	1–1	W1
3	April 10	Dodgers	9–4	**Chacín** (1–0)	Urías (0–1)	**Blach** (1)	**Coors Field**	40,825	2–1	W2
4	April 11	@ Rangers	6–4 (10)	**Bard** (1–0)	Holland (0–1)	**Goudeau** (1)	Globe Life Field	35,052	3–1	W3
5	April 12	@ Rangers	4–1	**Chacín** (2–0)	Pérez (0–1)	**Bard** (2)	Globe Life Field	15,862	4–1	W4
6	April 14	Cubs	2–5	Thompson (1–0)	**Freeland** (0–2)	Givens (1)	**Coors Field**	24,444	4–2	L1
7	April 15	Cubs	6–5	**Blach** (1–0)	Stroman (0–1)	**Bard** (3)	**Coors Field**	35,450	5–2	W1
8	April 16	Cubs	9–6	**Senzatela** (1–0)	Leiter Jr. (0–1)	**Bard** (4)	**Coors Field**	37,476	6–2	W2
9	April 17	Cubs	4–6	Wick (1–0)	**Gomber** (0–1)	Robertson (3)	**Coors Field**	36,391	6–3	L1
10	April 18	Phillies	4–1	**Kuhl** (1–0)	Nola (1–2)	**Colomé** (1)	**Coors Field**	20,403	7–3	W1
11	April 19	Phillies	6–5	**Lawrence** (1–0)	Domínguez (1–1)	**Bard** (5)	**Coors Field**	23,800	8–3	W2
12	April 20	Phillies	6–9	Hand (1–0)	**Chacín** (2–1)	Knebel (2)	**Coors Field**	21,490	8–4	L1
—	April 22	@ Tigers	PPD, RAIN; rescheduled for Apr 23							
13	April 23 (1)	@ Tigers	0–13	Skubal (1–1)	**Senzatela** (1–1)	—	Comerica Park	37,566	8–5	L2
14	April 23 (2)	@ Tigers	3–2	**Gomber** (1–1)	Brieske (0–1)	**Colomé** (2)	Comerica Park	28,635	9–5	W1
15	April 24	@ Tigers	6–2	**Kuhl** (2–0)	Alexander (0–2)	—	Comerica Park	20,088	10–5	W2
16	April 25	@ Phillies	2–8	Gibson (2–1)	**Freeland** (0–3)	—	Citizens Bank Park	20,130	10–6	L1
17	April 26	@ Phillies	3–10	Eflin (1–1)	**Márquez** (0–1)	—	Citizens Bank Park	22,300	10–7	L2
18	April 27	@ Phillies	3–7	Suárez (2–0)	**Feltner** (0–1)	—	Citizens Bank Park	20,127	10–8	L3
19	April 28	@ Phillies	1–7	Wheeler (1–3)	**Gomber** (1–2)	—	Citizens Bank Park	20,098	10–9	L4
20	April 29	Reds	10–4	**Senzatela** (2–1)	Greene (1–3)	—	**Coors Field**	30,206	11–9	W1
21	April 30	Reds	4–3	**Kuhl** (3–0)	Warren (0–1)	**Bard** (6)	**Coors Field**	32,179	12–9	W2

May: 10–17 (Home: 7–7; Away: 3–10)

#	Date	Opponent	Score	Win	Loss	Save	Stadium	Attendance	Record	Streak
22	May 1	Reds	10–1	**Freeland** (1–3)	Sanmartin (0–4)	—	**Coors Field**	32,574	13–9	W3
23	May 3	Nationals	2–10	Fedde (2–2)	**Márquez** (0–2)	—	**Coors Field**	20,758	13–10	L1
24	May 4	Nationals	5–2	**Gomber** (2–2)	Corbin (0–5)	**Bard** (7)	**Coors Field**	19,387	14–10	W1
25	May 5	Nationals	9–7	**Chacín** (3–1)	Sanchez (1–2)	**Bard** (8)	**Coors Field**	30,139	15–10	W2
26	May 6	@ Diamondbacks	1–4	Kelly (3–1)	**Estévez** (1–1)	Melancon (5)	Chase Field	18,551	15–11	L1
27	May 7	@ Diamondbacks	4–1	**Colomé** (1–0)	Melancon (0–3)	**Bard** (9)	Chase Field	24,133	16–11	W1
28	May 8	@ Diamondbacks	0–4	Gallen (2–0)	**Márquez** (0–3)	—	Chase Field	19,323	16–12	L1
29	May 9	@ Giants	5–8	Rodón (4–1)	**Gomber** (2–3)	—	Oracle Park	20,039	16–13	L2
30	May 10	@ Giants	2–9	Wood (3–2)	**Senzatela** (2–2)	—	Oracle Park	21,472	16–14	L3
31	May 11	@ Giants	1–7	Cobb (2–1)	**Kuhl** (3–1)	—	Oracle Park	23,341	16–15	L4
32	May 13	Royals	10–14	Coleman (1–1)	**Freeland** (1–4)	Barlow (3)	**Coors Field**	35,176	16–16	L5
33	May 14	Royals	10–4	**Márquez** (1–3)	Hernández (0–3)	—	**Coors Field**	40,534	17–16	W1
34	May 15	Royals	7–8	Staumont (1–0)	**Bard** (1–1)	Barlow (4)	**Coors Field**	34,505	17–17	L1
35	May 16	Giants	6–7	Brebbia (1–0)	**Bard** (1–2)	Doval (6)	**Coors Field**	23,180	17–18	L2
36	May 17	Giants	7–10	Cobb (3–1)	**Kuhl** (3–2)	Doval (7)	**Coors Field**	25,735	17–19	L3
37	May 18	Giants	5–3	**Kinley** (1–0)	Álvarez (1–1)	**Bard** (10)	**Coors Field**	26,713	18–19	W1
—	May 20	Mets	PPD, SNOW; rescheduled for May 21							
38	May 21 (1)	Mets	1–5	Carrasco (4–1)	**Márquez** (1–4)	—	**Coors Field**	20,737	18–20	L1
39	May 21 (2)	Mets	11–3	**Goudeau** (1–0)	Williams (0–3)	—	**Coors Field**	25,783	19–20	W1
40	May 22	Mets	0–2	Walker (2–0)	**Gomber** (2–4)	Díaz (10)	**Coors Field**	35,248	19–21	L1
41	May 23	@ Pirates	1–2	Bednar (1–0)	**Kinley** (1–1)	—	PNC Park	8,376	19–22	L2
42	May 24	@ Pirates	2–1 (10)	**Bard** (2–2)	Bednar (1–1)	—	PNC Park	9,009	20–22	W1
43	May 25	@ Pirates	5–10	Peters (4–2)	**Lawrence** (1–1)	—	PNC Park	10,014	20–23	L1
44	May 26	@ Nationals	3–7	Corbin (1–7)	**Márquez** (1–5)	—	Nationals Park	16,264	20–24	L2
—	May 27	@ Nationals	PPD, RAIN; rescheduled for May 28							
45	May 28 (1)	@ Nationals	7–13	Ramírez (1–0)	**Gomber** (2–5)	—	Nationals Park	20,294	20–25	L3
46	May 28 (2)	@ Nationals	3–2	**Kuhl** (4–2)	Finnegan (1–1)	**Bard** (11)	Nationals Park	26,535	21–25	W1
47	May 29	@ Nationals	5–6	Gray (5–4)	**Freeland** (1–5)	Rainey (5)	Nationals Park	25,225	21–26	L1
48	May 30	Marlins	7–1	**Feltner** (1–1)	Sulser (0–2)	—	**Coors Field**	40,275	22–26	W1
—	May 31	Marlins	PPD, RAIN; rescheduled for June 1							

June: 11–17 (Home: 6–9; Away: 5–8)

#	Date	Opponent	Score	Win	Loss	Save	Stadium	Attendance	Record	Streak
49	June 1 (1)	Marlins	1–14	Cabrera (1–0)	**Senzatela** (2–3)	—	**Coors Field**	see 2nd game	22–27	L1
50	June 1 (2)	Marlins	13–12 (10)	**Bard** (3–2)	Sulser (0–3)	—	**Coors Field**	22,719	23–27	W1
51	June 2	Braves	6–13	Anderson (4–3)	**Gomber** (2–6)	—	**Coors Field**	26,594	23–28	L1
52	June 3	Braves	1–3 (10)	Minter (1–0)	**Estévez** (1–2)	Jansen (13)	**Coors Field**	37,336	23–29	L2
53	June 4	Braves	2–6 (11)	Minter (2–0)	**Chacín** (3–2)	—	**Coors Field**	41,054	23–30	L3
54	June 5	Braves	7–8	Morton (4–3)	**Feltner** (1–2)	Jansen (14)	**Coors Field**	39,409	23–31	L4
55	June 7	@ Giants	5–3	**Márquez** (2–5)	Littell (1–2)	**Bard** (12)	Oracle Park	24,785	24–31	W1
56	June 8	@ Giants	1–2 (10)	Doval (1–2)	**Estévez** (1–3)	—	Oracle Park	21,535	24–32	L1
57	June 9	@ Giants	4–2	**Gomber** (3–6)	Webb (5–2)	**Colomé** (3)	Oracle Park	23,780	25–32	W1
58	June 10	@ Padres	0–9	Musgrove (7–0)	**Kuhl** (4–3)	—	Petco Park	35,207	25–33	L1
59	June 11 (1)	@ Padres	1–2 (10)	Wilson (4–1)	**Estévez** (1–4)	—	Petco Park	31,415	25–34	L2
60	June 11 (2)	@ Padres	6–2	**Freeland** (2–5)	Gore (4–2)	—	Petco Park	30,040	26–34	W1
61	June 12	@ Padres	4–2	**Márquez** (3–5)	García (4–3)	**Bard** (13)	Petco Park	41,754	27–34	W2
62	June 14	Guardians	3–4 (10)	Shaw (2–0)	**Stephenson** (0–1)	Clase (12)	**Coors Field**	28,377	27–35	L1
63	June 15	Guardians	5–7	Shaw (3–0)	**Gomber** (3–7)	Clase (13)	**Coors Field**	23,838	27–36	L2
64	June 16	Guardians	2–4	McKenzie (4–5)	**Kuhl** (4–4)	Clase (14)	**Coors Field**	26,629	27–37	L3
65	June 17	Padres	10–4	**Freeland** (3–5)	Gore (4–3)	—	**Coors Field**	34,304	28–37	W1
66	June 18	Padres	5–4	**Colomé** (2–0)	García (4–4)	**Bard** (14)	**Coors Field**	38,768	29–37	W2
67	June 19	Padres	8–3	**Senzatela** (3–3)	Snell (0–4)	—	**Coors Field**	47,342	30–37	W3
68	June 21	@ Marlins	8–9	Okert (4–0)	**Colomé** (2–1)	Scott (6)	LoanDepot Park	9,012	30–38	L1
69	June 22	@ Marlins	4–7	López (5–3)	**Kuhl** (4–5)	—	LoanDepot Park	8,983	30–39	L2
70	June 23	@ Marlins	2–3	Okert (5–0)	**Colomé** (2–2)	Scott (7)	LoanDepot Park	11,854	30–40	L3
71	June 24	@ Twins	1–0	**Márquez** (4–5)	Bundy (4–4)	**Bard** (15)	Target Field	24,643	31–40	W1
72	June 25	@ Twins	0–6	Archer (2–3)	**Senzatela** (3–4)	—	Target Field	24,578	31–41	L1
73	June 26	@ Twins	3–6	Ryan (6–3)	**Feltner** (1–3)	Durán (5)	Target Field	28,048	31–42	L2
74	June 27	Dodgers	4–0	**Kuhl** (5–5)	Anderson (8–1)	—	**Coors Field**	38,706	32–42	W1
75	June 28	Dodgers	7–4	**Freeland** (4–5)	Kershaw (5–2)	—	**Coors Field**	36,097	33–42	W2
76	June 29	Dodgers	4–8	Urías (6–6)	**Márquez** (4–6)	—	**Coors Field**	37,092	33–43	L1

July: 13–14 (Home: 9–7; Away: 4–7)

#	Date	Opponent	Score	Win	Loss	Save	Stadium	Attendance	Record	Streak
77	July 1	Diamondbacks	3–9	Kelly (7–5)	**Senzatela** (3–5)	—	**Coors Field**	47,588	33–44	L2
78	July 2	Diamondbacks	11–7	**Gomber** (4–7)	Keuchel (2–6)	—	**Coors Field**	48,331	34–44	W1
79	July 3	Diamondbacks	6–5	**Bird** (1–0)	Ramirez (2–2)	**Bard** (16)	**Coors Field**	33,479	35–44	W2
80	July 4	@ Dodgers	3–5	Urías (7–6)	**Freeland** (4–6)	Almonte (1)	Dodger Stadium	47,163	35–45	L1
81	July 5	@ Dodgers	2–5	Pepiot (1–0)	**Márquez** (4–7)	Graterol (2)	Dodger Stadium	45,885	35–46	L2
82	July 6	@ Dodgers	1–2	Kimbrel (2–4)	**Bard** (3–3)	—	Dodger Stadium	45,098	35–47	L3
83	July 7	@ Diamondbacks	4–3	**Estévez** (2–4)	Melancon (3–7)	**Bard** (17)	Chase Field	11,727	36–47	W1
84	July 8	@ Diamondbacks	6–5	**Kuhl** (6–5)	Poppen (1–2)	**Colomé** (4)	Chase Field	15,524	37–47	W2
85	July 9	@ Diamondbacks	2–9	Bumgarner (5–8)	**Freeland** (4–7)	—	Chase Field	21,819	37–48	L1
86	July 10	@ Diamondbacks	3–2	**Márquez** (5–7)	Middleton (1–2)	**Bard** (18)	Chase Field	18,126	38–48	W1
87	July 11	Padres	5–6	Manaea (4–4)	**Ureña** (0–1)	Rogers (24)	**Coors Field**	27,592	38–49	L1
88	July 12	Padres	5–3	**Gomber** (5–7)	Clevinger (2–2)	**Bard** (19)	**Coors Field**	26,577	39–49	W1
89	July 13	Padres	10–6	**Stephenson** (1–1)	Scott (0–1)	—	**Coors Field**	25,725	40–49	W2
90	July 14	Padres	8–5	**Chacín** (4–2)	Crismatt (5–2)	**Estévez** (1)	**Coors Field**	28,077	41–49	W3
91	July 15	Pirates	13–2	**Márquez** (6–7)	Quintana (2–5)	—	**Coors Field**	33,710	42–49	W4
92	July 16	Pirates	2–0	**Ureña** (1–1)	Keller (3–7)	**Bard** (20)	**Coors Field**	34,169	43–49	W5
93	July 17	Pirates	3–8	Beede (1–1)	**Bird** (1–1)	—	**Coors Field**	27,591	43–50	L1
**92nd All-Star Game in Los Angeles, California**
94	July 22	@ Brewers	5–6 (13)	Suter (2–3)	**Bird** (1–2)	—	American Family Field	33,357	43–51	L2
95	July 23	@ Brewers	4–9	Woodruff (8–3)	**Ureña** (1–2)	—	American Family Field	31,694	43–52	L3
96	July 24	@ Brewers	9–10	Suter (3–3)	**Colomé** (2–3)	Hader (28)	American Family Field	36,465	43–53	L4
97	July 25	@ Brewers	2–0	**Freeland** (5–7)	Ashby (2–8)	**Bard** (21)	American Family Field	25,194	44–53	W1
98	July 26	White Sox	1–2	Kopech (4–6)	**Márquez** (6–8)	Hendriks (19)	**Coors Field**	40,233	44–54	L1
99	July 27	White Sox	6–5	**Stephenson** (2–1)	Graveman (3–2)	—	**Coors Field**	30,731	45–54	W1
100	July 28	Dodgers	0–13	Anderson (11–1)	**Ureña** (1–3)	—	**Coors Field**	32,182	45–55	L1
101	July 29	Dodgers	4–5	Urías (10–6)	**Kuhl** (6–6)	Kimbrel (18)	**Coors Field**	41,656	45–56	L2
102	July 30	Dodgers	5–3	**Freeland** (6–7)	Kershaw (7–3)	**Bard** (22)	**Coors Field**	47,415	46–56	W1
103	July 31	Dodgers	3–7	Gonsolin (12–1)	**Márquez** (6–9)	—	**Coors Field**	36,212	46–57	L1

August: 10–18 (Home: 6–6; Away: 4–12)

#	Date	Opponent	Score	Win	Loss	Save	Stadium	Attendance	Record	Streak
104	August 1	@ Padres	1–4	Clevinger (3–3)	**Senzatela** (3–6)	García (2)	Petco Park	29,983	46–58	L2
105	August 2 (1)	@ Padres	5–13	Darvish (10–4)	**Bird** (1–3)	—	Petco Park	23,828	46–59	L3
106	August 2 (2)	@ Padres	2–3	Hader (2–4)	**Colomé** (2–4)	—	Petco Park	30,759	46–60	L4
107	August 3	@ Padres	1–9	Snell (4–5)	**Kuhl** (6–7)	—	Petco Park	44,652	46–61	L5
108	August 4	@ Padres	7–3	**Freeland** (7–7)	Musgrove (8–5)	—	Petco Park	30,366	47–61	W1
109	August 5	@ Diamondbacks	5–6	Devenski (1–0)	**Colomé** (2–5)	Kennedy (6)	Chase Field	17,720	47–62	L1
110	August 6	@ Diamondbacks	3–2	**Estévez** (3–4)	Kennedy (4–5)	**Bard** (23)	Chase Field	21,146	48–62	W1
111	August 7	@ Diamondbacks	4–6	Devenski (2–0)	**Colomé** (2–6)	Melancon (15)	Chase Field	20,644	48–63	L1
112	August 9	Cardinals	16–5	**Feltner** (2–3)	Mikolas (8–9)	—	**Coors Field**	35,011	49–63	W1
113	August 10	Cardinals	5–9	Quintana (4–5)	**Freeland** (7–8)	—	**Coors Field**	35,164	49–64	L1
114	August 11	Cardinals	8–6	**Gilbreath** (1–0)	Hicks (3–6)	**Bard** (24)	**Coors Field**	30,293	50–64	W1
115	August 12	Diamondbacks	5–3	**Lamet** (1–1)	Devenski (2–1)	**Estévez** (2)	**Coors Field**	32,055	51–64	W2
116	August 13	Diamondbacks	0–6	Gallen (8–2)	**Ureña** (1–4)	—	**Coors Field**	35,233	51–65	L1
117	August 14	Diamondbacks	4–7	Henry (2–1)	**Feltner** (2–4)	Kennedy (8)	**Coors Field**	32,442	51–66	L2
118	August 16	@ Cardinals	4–5	Helsley (7–1)	**Lamet** (1–2)	—	Busch Stadium	39,105	51–67	L3
119	August 17	@ Cardinals	1–5	Montgomery (6–3)	**Márquez** (6–10)	—	Busch Stadium	38,033	51–68	L4
120	August 18	@ Cardinals	0–13	Wainwright (9–8)	**Senzatela** (3–7)	—	Busch Stadium	36,137	51–69	L5
121	August 19	Giants	7–4	**Ureña** (2–4)	Wood (8–10)	**Bard** (25)	**Coors Field**	31,604	52–69	W1
122	August 20	Giants	4–3 (10)	**Gilbreath** (2–0)	Doval (4–6)	—	**Coors Field**	35,278	53–69	W2
123	August 21	Giants	8–9 (11)	Leone (4–4)	**Bird** (1–4)	Littell (1)	**Coors Field**	30,682	53–70	L1
124	August 23	Rangers	7–6	**Lawrence** (2–1)	Burke (6–3)	**Bard** (26)	**Coors Field**	28,533	54–70	W1
125	August 24	Rangers	4–16	Pérez (10–4)	**Ureña** (2–5)	—	**Coors Field**	25,213	54–71	L1
126	August 25	@ Mets	1–3	deGrom (3–1)	**Feltner** (2–5)	Ottavino (1)	Citi Field	37,377	54–72	L2
127	August 26	@ Mets	6–7	Díaz (3–1)	**Bard** (3–4)	—	Citi Field	32,447	54–73	L3
128	August 27	@ Mets	0–3	Peterson (7–3)	**Freeland** (7–9)	Ottavino (2)	Citi Field	42,617	54–74	L4
129	August 28	@ Mets	1–0	**Márquez** (7–10)	Scherzer (9–4)	**Bard** (27)	Citi Field	36,396	55–74	W1
130	August 30	@ Braves	3–2	**Ureña** (3–5)	Fried (12–5)	**Bard** (28)	Truist Park	34,237	56–74	W2
131	August 31	@ Braves	2–3	Wright (17–5)	**Feltner** (2–6)	Jansen (30)	Truist Park	29,554	56–75	L1

September: 9–17 (Home: 5–8; Away: 4–9)

#	Date	Opponent	Score	Win	Loss	Save	Stadium	Attendance	Record	Streak
132	September 1	@ Braves	0–3	Strider (9–4)	**Kuhl** (6–8)	Jansen (31)	Truist Park	31,203	56–76	L2
133	September 2	@ Reds	2–3	Díaz (5–2)	**Colomé** (2–7)	—	Great American Ball Park	16,763	56–77	L3
—	September 3	@ Reds	PPD, RAIN; rescheduled for Sept 4							
134	September 4 (1)	@ Reds	8–4	**Márquez** (8–10)	Kuhnel (2–3)	—	Great American Ball Park	see 2nd game	57–77	W1
135	September 4 (2)	@ Reds	0–10	Law (2–1)	**Ureña** (3–6)	—	Great American Ball Park	23,060	57–78	L1
136	September 5	Brewers	4–6	Houser (5–9)	**Feltner** (2–7)	Williams (10)	**Coors Field**	32,627	57–79	L2
137	September 6	Brewers	10–7 (10)	**Bard** (4–4)	Rogers (3–7)	—	**Coors Field**	22,329	58–79	W1
138	September 7	Brewers	8–4	**Freeland** (8–9)	Lauer (10–7)	—	**Coors Field**	20,278	59–79	W2
139	September 9	Diamondbacks	13–10	**Bard** (5–4)	Smith (1–2)	—	**Coors Field**	34,848	60–79	W3
140	September 10	Diamondbacks	4–1	**Lawrence** (3–1)	Bumgarner (6–14)	**Bard** (29)	**Coors Field**	27,871	61–79	W4
141	September 11	Diamondbacks	6–12	Gallen (12–2)	**Feltner** (2–8)	—	**Coors Field**	27,546	61–80	L1
142	September 13	@ White Sox	2–4	Kopech (5–9)	**Kuhl** (6–9)	Hendriks (33)	Guaranteed Rate Field	23,606	61–81	L2
143	September 14	@ White Sox	3–0	**Freeland** (9–9)	Cease (14–7)	**Bard** (30)	Guaranteed Rate Field	16,654	62–81	W1
144	September 16	@ Cubs	1–2	Stroman (4–7)	**Márquez** (8–11)	Rodríguez (2)	Wrigley Field	31,775	62–82	L2
145	September 17	@ Cubs	3–1	**Estévez** (4–4)	Alzolay (0–1)	**Bard** (31)	Wrigley Field	34,530	63–82	W1
146	September 18	@ Cubs	4–3	**Feltner** (3–8)	Assad (1–2)	**Bard** (32)	Wrigley Field	35,627	64–82	W2
147	September 19	Giants	7–10 (10)	Doval (6–6)	**Hollowell** (0–1)	Alexander (2)	**Coors Field**	23,055	64–83	L1
148	September 20	Giants	3–6	Rogers (3–4)	**Freeland** (9–10)	García (1)	**Coors Field**	23,942	64–84	L2
149	September 21	Giants	1–6	Webb (14–9)	**Márquez** (8–12)	—	**Coors Field**	23,293	64–85	L3
150	September 22	Giants	0–3	Cotton (3–2)	**Ureña** (3–7)	Doval (24)	**Coors Field**	25,669	64–86	L4
151	September 23	Padres	4–3 (10)	**Bard** (6–4)	Morejón (4–1)	—	**Coors Field**	48,321	65–86	W1
152	September 24	Padres	3–9	Darvish (16–7)	**Kuhl** (6–10)	—	**Coors Field**	45,983	65–87	L1
153	September 25	Padres	6–13	Suárez (5–1)	**Freeland** (9–11)	—	**Coors Field**	40,503	65–88	L2
154	September 27	@ Giants	2–5	Webb (15–9)	**Márquez** (8–13)	—	Oracle Park	24,218	65–89	L3
155	September 28	@ Giants	3–6	Hjelle (1–2)	**Ureña** (3–8)	—	Oracle Park	22,663	65–90	L4
156	September 29	@ Giants	4–6	Rodón (14–8)	**Feltner** (3–9)	Doval (27)	Oracle Park	24,112	65–91	L5
157	September 30	@ Dodgers	1–10	Kershaw (11–3)	**Kuhl** (6–11)	—	Dodger Stadium	52,025	65–92	L6

October: 3–2 (Home: 0–0; Away: 3–2)

#	Date	Opponent	Score	Win	Loss	Save	Stadium	Attendance	Record	Streak
158	October 1	@ Dodgers	4–6	Phillips (7–3)	**Hollowell** (0–2)	Graterol (4)	Dodger Stadium	47,334	65–93	L7
159	October 2	@ Dodgers	4–1	**Márquez** (9–13)	Anderson (15–5)	**Bard** (33)	Dodger Stadium	44,091	66–93	W1
160	October 3	@ Dodgers	2–1	**Bird** (2–4)	Graterol (2–4)	**Lawrence** (1)	Dodger Stadium	52,012	67–93	W2
161	October 4	@ Dodgers	5–2	**Feltner** (4–9)	Heaney (4–4)	**Bard** (34)	Dodger Stadium	51,833	68–93	W3
162	October 5	@ Dodgers	1–6	Kershaw (12–3)	**Smith** (0–1)	—	Dodger Stadium	37,514	68–94	L1

Legend: = Win = Loss = Postponement
Bold = Rockies team member

== Roster ==
2022 Colorado Rockies
Roster
Pitchers: 52 Daniel Bard; 59 Jake Bird; 50 Ty Blach; 43 Jhoulys Chacín; 37 Alex Colomé; 63 Noah Davis; 54 Carlos Estévez; 18 Ryan Feltner; 21 Kyle Freeland; 58 Lucas Gilbreath; 26 Austin Gomber; 60 Ashton Goudeau; 46,64 Gavin Hollowell; 40 Tyler Kinley; 41 Chad Kuhl; 32 Dinelson Lamet; 61 Justin Lawrence; 48 Germán Márquez; 49 Antonio Senzatela; 34 Jordan Sheffield; 56 Chad Smith; 29 Robert Stephenson; 51 José Ureña	Catchers: 35 Elías Díaz; 3 Dom Núñez; 6 Brian Serven; Infielders: 25 C. J. Cron; 1 Garrett Hampson; 11 José Iglesias; 24 Ryan McMahon; 44 Elehuris Montero; 7 Brendan Rodgers; 14 Ezequiel Tovar; 13 Alan Trejo	Outfielders: 36 Wynton Bernard; 19 Charlie Blackmon; 12 Sean Bouchard; 23 Kris Bryant; 2 Yonathan Daza; 15 Randal Grichuk; 22 Sam Hilliard; 9 Connor Joe; 29 Michael Toglia	Manager: 10 Bud Black; Coaches: 39 Stu Cole (third base); 74 Reid Cornelius (bullpen); 75 Kyle Cunningham (asst. bullpen catcher); 53 Ronnie Gideon (first base); 38 Andy González (assistant hitting); 16 Dave Magadan (hitting); 77 Aaron Muñoz (bullpen catcher); 68 P. J. Pilittere (assistant hitting); 8 Mike Redmond (bench); 72 Darryl Scott (Pitching)

== Statistics ==
Final.

=== Batting ===
List does not include pitchers. Stats in bold are the team leaders.

Note: G = Games played; AB = At bats; R = Runs; H = Hits; 2B = Doubles; 3B = Triples; HR = Home runs; RBI = Runs batted in; BB = Walks; SO = Strikeouts; AVG = Batting average; OBP = On-base percentage; SLG = Slugging; OPS = On base + slugging

Player	G	AB	R	H	2B	3B	HR	RBI	BB	SO	AVG	OBP	SLG	OPS
C. J. Cron	150	**575**	**79**	**148**	28	3	**29**	**102**	43	**164**	.257	.315	**.468**	**.783**
Charlie Blackmon	135	530	60	140	22	**6**	16	78	32	109	.264	.314	.419	.733
Ryan McMahon	**153**	529	67	130	23	3	20	67	**60**	158	.246	**.327**	.414	.741
Brendan Rodgers	137	527	72	140	30	3	13	63	46	101	**.266**	.325	.408	.733
Randal Grichuk	141	506	60	131	21	2	19	73	24	127	.259	.299	.425	.724
José Iglesias	118	439	48	128	**30**	0	3	47	17	56	.292	.328	.380	.708
Connor Joe	111	404	56	96	20	**4**	7	28	55	97	.238	.338	.359	.697
Yonathan Daza	113	372	56	112	21	2	2	34	26	58	.301	.349	.384	.733
Elías Díaz	105	351	29	80	18	2	9	51	25	82	.228	.281	.368	.649
Garrett Hampson	90	199	29	42	7	3	2	15	21	63	.211	.287	.307	.594
Brian Serven	62	187	19	38	4	1	6	16	13	44	.203	.261	.332	.593
Elehuris Montero	53	176	21	41	15	1	6	16	8	60	.233	.270	.432	.702
Sam Hilliard	70	174	26	32	6	1	2	14	23	57	.184	.280	.264	.544
Kris Bryant	42	160	28	49	12	0	5	14	17	27	.306	.376	.475	.851
Alan Trejo	35	118	15	32	6	0	4	17	5	31	.271	.312	.424	.736
Michael Toglia	31	111	10	24	8	2	2	12	9	44	.216	.275	.378	.653
Sean Bouchard	27	74	9	22	6	0	3	11	21	25	.297	.454	.500	.954
Wynton Bernard	12	42	9	12	1	0	0	3	0	8	.286	.286	.310	.596
Dom Núñez	14	33	3	4	1	0	0	2	6	10	.121	.244	.152	.396
Ezequiel Tovar	9	33	2	7	1	0	1	2	2	9	.212	.257	.333	.590
**Team totals**	**162**	**5540**	**698**	**1408**	**280**	**34**	**149**	**669**	**453**	**1380**	**.254**	**.315**	**.398**	**.713**

=== Pitching ===
List does not include position players. Stats in bold are the team leaders.

Note: W = Wins; L = Losses; ERA = Earned run average; G = Games pitched; GS = Games started; SV = Saves; IP = Innings pitched; H = Hits allowed; R = Runs allowed; ER = Earned runs allowed; BB = Walks allowed; K = Strikeouts

Player	W	L	ERA	G	GS	SV	IP	H	R	ER	BB	K
Germán Márquez	**9**	**13**	5.00	31	**31**	0	**181.2**	185	**109**	**101**	**63**	**150**
Kyle Freeland	**9**	11	**4.53**	31	**31**	0	174.2	**193**	96	88	53	131
Chad Kuhl	6	11	5.72	27	27	0	137.0	155	91	87	58	110
Austin Gomber	5	7	5.56	33	17	0	124.2	137	80	77	34	95
Ryan Feltner	4	9	5.83	20	19	0	97.1	102	65	63	35	84
Antonio Senzatela	3	7	5.07	19	19	0	92.1	133	56	52	23	54
José Ureña	3	8	5.14	17	17	0	89.1	102	57	51	38	60
Daniel Bard	6	4	1.79	57	0	**34**	60.1	35	15	12	25	69
Carlos Estévez	4	4	3.47	**62**	0	2	57.0	44	27	22	23	54
Jake Bird	2	4	4.91	38	0	0	47.2	45	29	26	23	42
Jhoulys Chacín	4	2	7.61	35	0	0	47.1	55	44	40	21	37
Álex Colomé	2	7	5.74	53	0	4	47.0	57	36	30	22	32
Robert Stephenson	2	1	6.04	45	0	0	44.2	53	34	30	13	37
Ty Blach	1	0	5.89	24	1	1	44.1	51	29	29	11	29
Lucas Gilbreath	2	0	4.19	47	0	0	43.0	37	22	20	26	49
Justin Lawrence	3	1	5.70	38	0	1	42.2	44	27	27	22	48
Tyler Kinley	1	1	0.75	25	0	0	24.0	21	5	2	6	27
Ashton Goudeau	1	0	7.08	12	0	1	20.1	25	18	16	10	16
Dinelson Lamet	1	1	4.05	19	0	0	20.0	14	9	9	10	29
Chad Smith	0	1	7.50	15	0	0	18.0	16	15	15	15	23
Gavin Hollowell	0	2	7.71	6	0	0	7.0	7	7	6	4	8
Jordan Sheffield	0	0	0.00	2	0	0	2.0	2	0	0	2	1
Noah Davis	0	0	18.00	1	0	0	1.0	3	2	2	1	2
**Team totals**	**68**	**94**	**5.06**	**162**	**162**	**43**	**1425.1**	**1516**	**873**	**802**	**539**	**1187**

== Farm system ==
Level	Team	League	Manager
Triple-A	Albuquerque Isotopes	Pacific Coast League	Warren Schaefer
Double-A	Hartford Yard Goats	Eastern League	Chris Denorfia
High-A	Spokane Indians	Northwest League	Scott Little
Low-A	Fresno Grizzlies	California League	Robinson Cancel
Rookie	ACL Rockies	Arizona Complex League	
Rookie	DSL Rockies	Dominican Summer League	

Records
Preceded by 2021	Colorado Rockies seasons 2022	Succeeded by 2023
