= Kyle Holder =

American baseball player (born 1994)

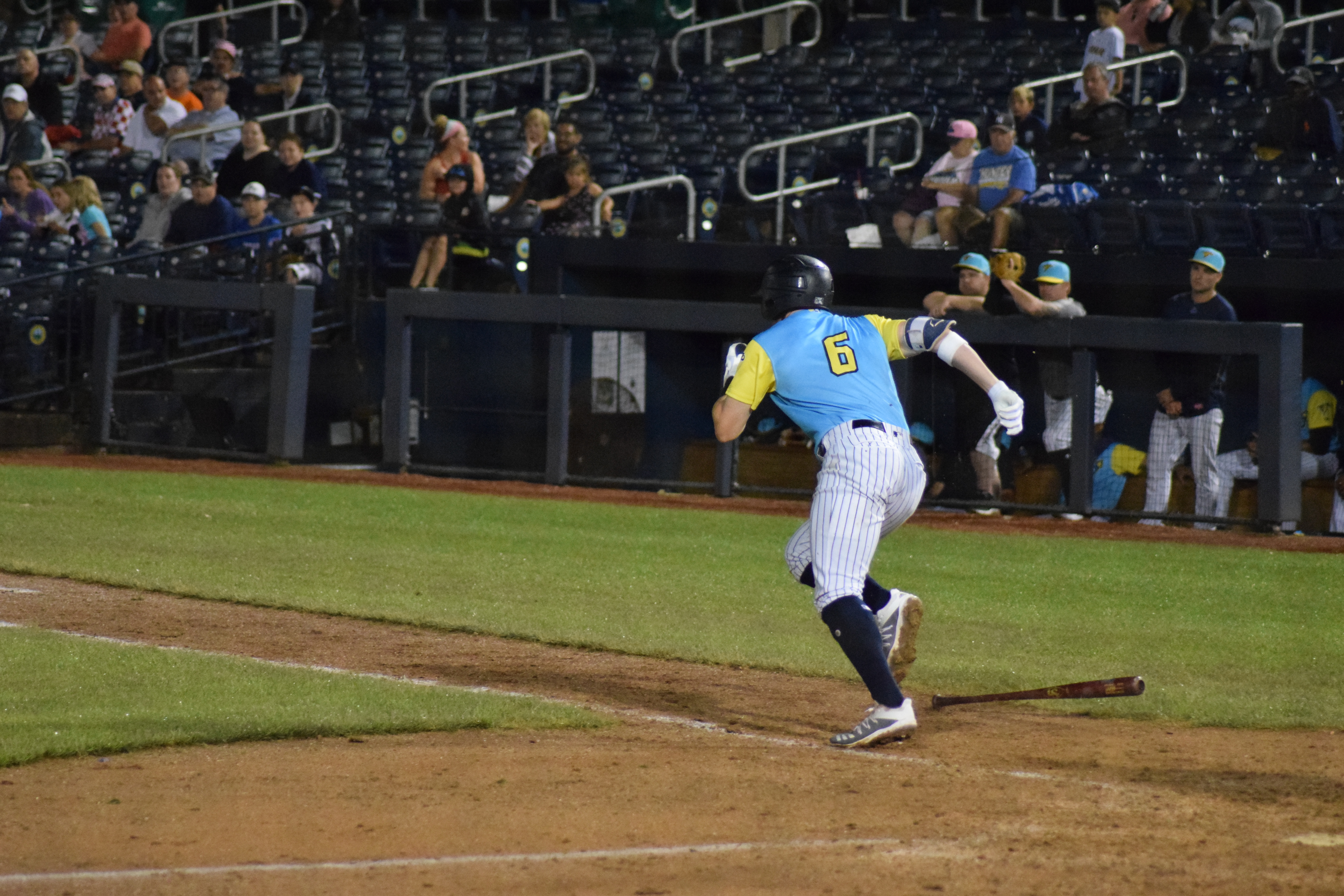
- Holder with the Trenton Thunder
- Shortstop
- Born: May 25, 1994 (age 32); San Diego, California, U.S.
- Bats: Left Throws: Right
- Stats at Baseball Reference

Kyle Patrick Holder (born May 25, 1994) is an American former professional baseball shortstop. He played college baseball at University of San Diego. He was drafted 30th overall by the New York Yankees in the first round of the 2015 MLB draft.

== Career ==
Holder graduated from University City High School in San Diego, California, in 2012. After graduating, he enrolled at Grossmont College where he played for their baseball team, posting a .405 batting average with sixty hits and 21 RBIs. After his freshman year at Grossmont, he then enrolled at the University of San Diego where he played baseball for the Toreros. After the 2014 season, he played collegiate summer baseball with the Cotuit Kettleers of the Cape Cod Baseball League. As a junior, he led USD in batting average (.348) and RBIs (31). He was named WCC player of the year. After his junior year, he was drafted by the New York Yankees in the first round of the 2015 MLB draft. Holder signed with the Yankees for $1.8 million signing bonus.

=== New York Yankees ===
After signing, the Yankees assigned Holder to the Staten Island Yankees, where he spent the whole season. Holder played for the Charleston RiverDogs in 2016, where he batted .290 with one home run and 18 RBIS, and the Tampa Yankees in 2017 where he batted .271 with four home runs and 44 RBIs.

In 2017, Holder was named as the Best Defensive Shortstop in the minor leagues. Holder was invited to the Arizona Fall League in 2017 and hit .333 over 45 at bats. He was then a non-roster invitee for the New York Yankees spring training in 2018 and started the year with Trenton Thunder. He also spent time during the season with the Charleston RiverDogs and the Trenton Thunder. Over 48 games between the two teams, he hit .257 with three home runs.

The Yankees invited Holder to spring training as a non-roster player in 2019. He spent the year with Trenton, slashing .265/.336/.405 with nine home runs and forty RBIs over 112 games.

On December 10, 2020, Holder was selected by the Philadelphia Phillies in the Rule 5 Draft. On January 30, 2021, Holder was traded to the Cincinnati Reds in exchange for cash considerations. On March 30, 2021, Holder was returned to the Yankees.

=== Colorado Rockies ===
On December 16, 2021, Holder signed a minor league contract with the Colorado Rockies. In 45 appearances for the Triple-A Albuquerque Isotopes, he batted .197/.276/.276 with two home runs and 11 RBI. Holder was released by the Rockies organization on July 24, 2022.
