= Colton Welker =

American baseball player (born 1997)

Free agent
- Third baseman
- Born: October 9, 1997 (age 28); Coral Springs, Florida, U.S.
- Bats: Right Throws: Right

MLB debut
- September 8, 2021, for the Colorado Rockies

MLB statistics (through 2021 season)
- Batting average: .189
- Home runs: 0
- Runs batted in: 2
- Stats at Baseball Reference

Teams
- Colorado Rockies (2021)

Colton Lawrence Welker (born October 9, 1997) is an American professional baseball third baseman who is a free agent. Welker was drafted by the Colorado Rockies in the fourth round of the 2016 MLB draft and made his Major League Baseball (MLB) debut in 2021 for the team.

== Professional career ==
=== Colorado Rockies ===
Welker was drafted by the Colorado Rockies in the fourth round of the 2016 MLB draft out of Stoneman Douglas High School (where he played shortstop and batted over .500 as a senior) in Parkland, Florida. He signed with Colorado for $855,000, foregoing his commitment to the University of Miami.

Welker spent the 2016 season playing third base with the rookie league Grand Junction Rockies, where he was named both a Pioneer League mid-season All-Star and a Rockies organizational All-Star at the end of the season after batting .329/.366/.491 with five home runs and 36 runs batted in during 51 games. He spent 2017 with the Single–A Asheville Tourists where batted .350 (second in the South Atlantic League)/.401(3rd)/.500(9th) with six home runs, 33 runs batted ins, and leading the league with three intentional walks in only 67 games due to injury.

In 2018, he played with the High–A Lancaster JetHawks where he slashed .333 (third in the league)/.383/.489 with 74 runs (7th in the league), 32 doubles (8th), 13 home runs, 82 runs batted in (4th), and two intentional walks (2nd), while grounding into 14 double plays (5th) and leading the league with 11 sacrifice flies in 114 games. He was named a California League mid-season All-Star along with earning a post-season All-Star selection.

Welker spent 2019 with the Double–A Hartford Yard Goats, hitting .252/.313/.408 with 10 home runs, 53 runs batted in, and 6 sacrifice flies (2nd in the Eastern League over 98 games. He did not play in a game in 2020 due to the cancellation of the minor league season because of the COVID-19 pandemic. On November 20, 2020, the Rockies added Welker to their 40-man roster to protect him from the Rule 5 draft. On May 6, 2021, Welker was suspended for 80 games after testing positive for chlorodehydromethyltestosterone. Playing for three minor league teams in 2021 he batted .258/.345/.483 in 120 at bats.

On September 8, 2021, Welker made his major league debut against the San Francisco Giants, flying out in his only at bat. He batted .189 for Rockies for the season in 37 at bats.

In 2022, he began the season playing for the Triple-A Albuquerque Isotopes, batting .324/.422/.514 in 37 at bats. On June 3, 2022, it was announced that Welker would undergo season-ending surgery to treat a shoulder injury. He was designated for assignment on July 6, 2022. In his career he had played primarily third base (299 games), with 54 games at first base.

=== San Francisco Giants ===
Welker was claimed off waivers by the San Francisco Giants on July 8, 2022. On November 15, Welker was designated for assignment by the Giants after they protected multiple prospects from the Rule 5 draft. On November 18, Welker was non–tendered by the Giants and became a free agent. He re–signed with the Giants on a minor league contract the following day.

Welker spent the 2023 season with the Triple–A Sacramento River Cats, playing in 43 games and hitting .237/.388/.274 with no home runs and 13 RBI. On July 14, 2023, Welker was released by the Giants organization.

=== York Revolution ===
On April 8, 2024, Welker signed with the York Revolution of the Atlantic League of Professional Baseball. However, prior to the start of the season on April 24, he was released by York. On May 11, Welker re–signed with the club. In 57 games for the Revolution, he slashed .347/.430/.621 with 11 home runs and 59 RBI. With York, Welker won the Atlantic League championship. He became a free agent following the season.

On October 9, 2024, Welker signed with the Saraperos de Saltillo of the Mexican League. He was released by the Saraperos prior to the start of the season on April 15, 2025.
