= Ben Bowden =

American baseball player (born 1994)

Athletics
- Pitcher
- Born: October 21, 1994 (age 32); Lynn, Massachusetts, U.S.
- Bats: Left Throws: Left

MLB debut
- April 2, 2021, for the Colorado Rockies

MLB statistics (through 2026 season)
- Win–loss record: 3–2
- Earned run average: 6.65
- Strikeouts: 49
- Stats at Baseball Reference

Teams
- Colorado Rockies (2021); Athletics (2025–2026)

Benjamin Douglas Bowden (born October 21, 1994) is an American professional baseball pitcher in the Athletics organization. He has previously played Major League Baseball (MLB) for the Colorado Rockies. He played college baseball for the Vanderbilt Commodores, and was selected by the Rockies in the second round of the 2016 MLB draft. He made his MLB debut in 2021.

== Amateur career ==
Bowden was born in Lynn, Massachusetts. He attended Lynn English High School, where he played for the school's baseball and basketball teams. As a senior, Bowden was named the state's high school baseball player of the year. He was named the 2013 Gatorade Player of the Year in Massachusetts.

After high school, he enrolled at Vanderbilt University where he played college baseball for the Vanderbilt Commodores. After his sophomore season in 2015, he played collegiate summer baseball for the Yarmouth–Dennis Red Sox of the Cape Cod Baseball League, where he posted a 0.30 earned run average (ERA) with 43 strikeouts over 30 innings pitched, helped lead the Red Sox to the league championship, and was named playoff co-most valuable player. In 2016, his 10 saves were 4th in the SEC, and his 12.0 strikeouts per 9 innings were 5th.

== Professional career ==
=== Colorado Rockies ===
The Colorado Rockies selected Bowden in the second round with the 45th overall selection of the 2016 Major League Baseball draft. He agreed to a $1.6 million signing bonus with the Rockies, and made his professional debut with the Asheville Tourists of the Single–A South Atlantic League. He spent all of 2016 with Asheville, where he posted an 0–1 record with 3.04 ERA in 26 games, averaging 11 strikeouts per 9 innings.

Bowden did not pitch in 2017 due to injury. He began the 2018 season with Asheville and was promoted at midseason to the Lancaster JetHawks of the High–A California League; over 52 innings pitched between the two teams, he went 7–2 with a 3.98 ERA and 78 strikeouts, averaging 13.5 strikeouts per 9 innings.

Bowden opened the 2019 season with the Hartford Yard Goats of the Double–A Eastern League, and served as Hartford's closer, before being promoted to the Albuquerque Isotopes of the Triple–A Pacific Coast League on June 20. Bowden was named to the 2019 All-Star Futures Game. Over 48 relief appearances between Hartford and Albuquerque, he pitched to a 1–3 record and a 3.48 ERA, averaging 14.7 strikeouts per 9 innings. His 20 saves with Hartford were 5th in the league, his 0.584 WHIP was 4th, and his 6.0 strikeouts per walk were 5th. The Rockies added him to their 40-man roster after the 2019 season.

Bowden made the Rockies' 2021 Opening Day roster. On April 2, 2021, Bowden made his MLB debut in relief against the Los Angeles Dodgers, allowing two runs in 1 1/3 innings pitched with two strikeouts. In 39 games, he posted a 3–2 record with a 6.56 ERA in 35 2/3 innings.

During spring training in 2022, the Rockies optioned Bowden to Albuquerque.

=== Tampa Bay Rays ===
On April 29, 2022, Bowden was claimed off waivers by the Tampa Bay Rays. In eight games for the Triple-A Durham Bulls, he posted a 1.80 ERA with a 3–0 record in 10 innings. He was designated for assignment on May 31. He cleared waivers and was sent outright to Triple-A Durham on June 4.

=== San Francisco Giants ===
On July 24, 2022, Bowden was traded by the Rays to the San Francisco Giants. In 22 games for the Triple–A Sacramento River Cats, he struggled to a 7.07 ERA with 41 strikeouts across 28 innings of work. Bowden elected free agency following the season on November 10.

=== Philadelphia Phillies ===
On January 24, 2023, Bowden signed a minor league contract with the Philadelphia Phillies organization. In 49 games out of the bullpen for the Triple–A Lehigh Valley IronPigs, he registered a 6–2 record and 4.64 ERA with 76 strikeouts and 5 saves across 52 1/3 innings of work. Bowden elected free agency following the season on November 6.

=== Atlanta Braves ===
On November 24, 2023, Bowden signed a minor league contract with the Atlanta Braves. In 27 games for the Triple–A Gwinnett Stripers, he compiled a 4.03 ERA with 35 strikeouts across 29 innings pitched. Bowden was released by the Braves organization on July 14, 2024.

=== Athletics ===
On December 9, 2024, Bowden signed a minor league contract with the Athletics. In 31 appearances for the Triple-A Las Vegas Aviators, he logged a 1–1 record and 1.36 ERA with 41 strikeouts and two saves across 39 2/3 innings pitched. On July 23, 2025, the Athletics selected Bowden's contract, adding him to their active roster. In 11 appearances for the team, he recorded a 4.22 ERA with seven strikeouts across 10 2/3 innings pitched. On August 22, Bowden was placed on the injured list due to a lat strain. He was transferred to the 60-day injured list on September 1, officially ending his season. On November 5, Bowden was removed from the 40-man roster and sent outright to Las Vegas; he subsequently rejected the assignment and elected free agency.

On November 11, 2025, Bowden re-signed with the Athletics on a minor league contract. He began the 2026 season with the Triple–A Las Vegas Aviators. On August 1, 2026, the Athletics selected Bowden's contract, adding him to their active roster. In his only appearance for the team, he allowed four runs in one inning of relief during an 11–0 loss to the Detroit Tigers. On August 4, Bowden was designated for assignment by the Athletics. He cleared waivers and was sent outright to Triple-A Las Vegas on August 6. He elected free agency on November 2.

On November 13, Bowden re-signed with the Athletics on a new minor league contract for the 2027 season.
