= Lucas Gilbreath =

American baseball player (born 1996)

Free agent
- Pitcher
- Born: March 5, 1996 (age 30); Westminster, Colorado, U.S.
- Bats: Left Throws: Left

MLB debut
- May 1, 2021, for the Colorado Rockies

MLB statistics (through 2025 season)
- Win–loss record: 5–2
- Earned run average: 4.41
- Strikeouts: 95
- Stats at Baseball Reference

Teams
- Colorado Rockies (2021–2022, 2024–2025)

Lucas Grant Gilbreath (born March 5, 1996) is an American professional baseball pitcher who is a free agent. He has previously played in Major League Baseball (MLB) for the Colorado Rockies. He made his MLB debut in 2021.

== Amateur career ==
Gilbreath attended Legacy High School in Broomfield, Colorado. He was drafted by the Colorado Rockies in the 36th round of the 2014 MLB draft but did not sign and played college baseball at the University of Minnesota. In 2016, he played collegiate summer baseball with the Hyannis Harbor Hawks of the Cape Cod Baseball League. He was a reliever for his first two seasons in college before working as a starting pitcher in 2017. That year, he won Minnesota's Dave Winfield Pitcher of the Year Award after leading the Golden Gophers with a 2.66 ERA and 92 strikeouts. He was again drafted by the Rockies, this time in the seventh round of the 2017 MLB draft, and signed for $203,400.

== Professional career ==
Gilbreath began his career with the rookie-level Grand Junction Rockies. In 2018, Gilbreath pitched for the Single-A Asheville Tourists, recording a 7–8 record and 5.04 ERA with 119 strikeouts in 116 innings pitched. He spent the 2019 season with the High-A Lancaster JetHawks, with a 5–10 record, 5.81 ERA, and 143 strikeouts in 28 appearances. Gilbreath did not pitch in games in 2020 as the minor league season was cancelled due to the COVID-19 pandemic. Instead, he trained at baseball facility in Broomfield, Colorado and the Rockies fall instructional camp, where he converted to a relief pitcher. On November 20, the Rockies added Gilbreath to their 40-man roster to protect him from the Rule 5 draft.

On April 17, 2021, Gilbreath was promoted to the major leagues for the first time, however he was optioned down the next day without making an appearance. He was recalled to the active roster on May 1. Gilbreath made his MLB debut that day and pitched an inning of relief, allowing a home run to the Arizona Diamondbacks' Josh Rojas in his first MLB pitch, with the ball landing in Chase Field's swimming pool. Gilbreath was amongst the best Rockies relievers in his rookie campaign, with an ERA of 3.38 in 47 games. He had 44 strikeouts in 42 2/3 innings. He appeared in 47 games for Colorado again in 2022, after beginning the season on the COVID-19 injured list. In 43 innings pitched, he had a 2–0 record, 4.19 ERA, and 49 strikeouts.

On March 7, 2023, it was announced that Gilbreath would undergo Tommy John surgery, ending his season before it began. On August 16, 2024, Gilbreath was activated from the injured list to make his return from surgery. In three appearances for the Rockies, he allowed six runs on seven hits with no strikeouts in one inning. He returned to the injured list on August 29 with shoulder inflammation, which ended his season. He had offseason surgery to treat thoracic outlet syndrome.

Gilbreath was optioned to the Triple-A Albuquerque Isotopes to begin the 2025 season. He was designated for assignment by the Rockies on April 27, 2025. He cleared waivers and was sent outright to Triple-A on April 29. On August 22, the Rockies selected Gilbreath's contract, adding him to their active roster. He made one appearance for the team, allowing one run with two strikeouts in one inning pitched. On October 31, Gilbreath was removed from the 40-man roster and sent outright. He rejected the assignment and elected free agency.

== Personal life ==
Gilbreath and his wife have one daughter. His mother is an elementary school principal.

Gilbreath supports a Denver animal rescue organization. He has also built several personal computers.
