= Ashton Goudeau =

American baseball player (born 1992)

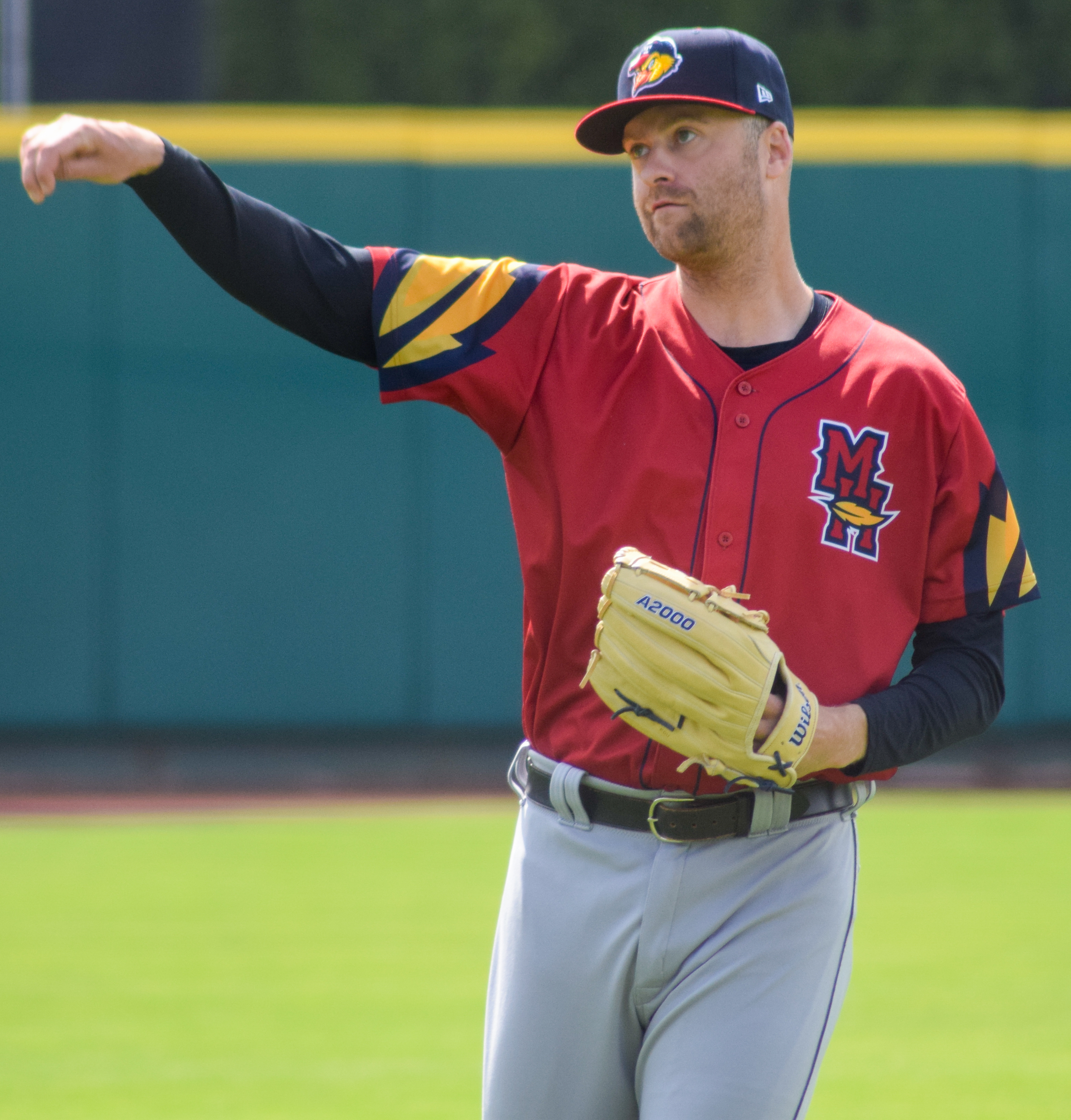
- Goudeau with the Toledo Mud Hens in 2023

Free agent
- Pitcher
- Born: July 23, 1992 (age 34); Newport, Arkansas, U.S.
- Bats: Right Throws: Right

MLB debut
- August 19, 2020, for the Colorado Rockies

MLB statistics (through 2022 season)
- Win–loss record: 3–1
- Earned run average: 5.57
- Strikeouts: 40
- Stats at Baseball Reference

Teams
- Colorado Rockies (2020); Cincinnati Reds (2021); Colorado Rockies (2021–2022)

Ashton Chase Goudeau (born July 23, 1992) is an American professional baseball pitcher who is a free agent. Goudeau was drafted by the Kansas City Royals in the 27th round of the 2012 MLB draft. He has previously played in Major League Baseball (MLB) for the Cincinnati Reds and Colorado Rockies.

== Career ==
=== Amateur career ===
Goudeau attended Union High School in Union, Missouri. Undrafted out of high school, he attended Maple Woods Community College.

=== Kansas City Royals ===
The Kansas City Royals selected Goudeau in the 27th round of the 2012 MLB draft. Goudeau spent the 2012 season with the AZL Royals, going 1–1 with a 3.97 ERA over 34 innings. He spent the 2013 season with the Idaho Falls Chukars, going 1–5 with a 10.18 ERA over 40 2/3 innings.

Goudeau split the 2014 season between Idaho Falls and the Lexington Legends, going a combined 1–0 with a 4.28 ERA over 33 2/3 innings. He split the 2015 season between Lexington and the Wilmington Blue Rocks, going a combined 7–4 with a 3.22 ERA over 86 2/3 innings.

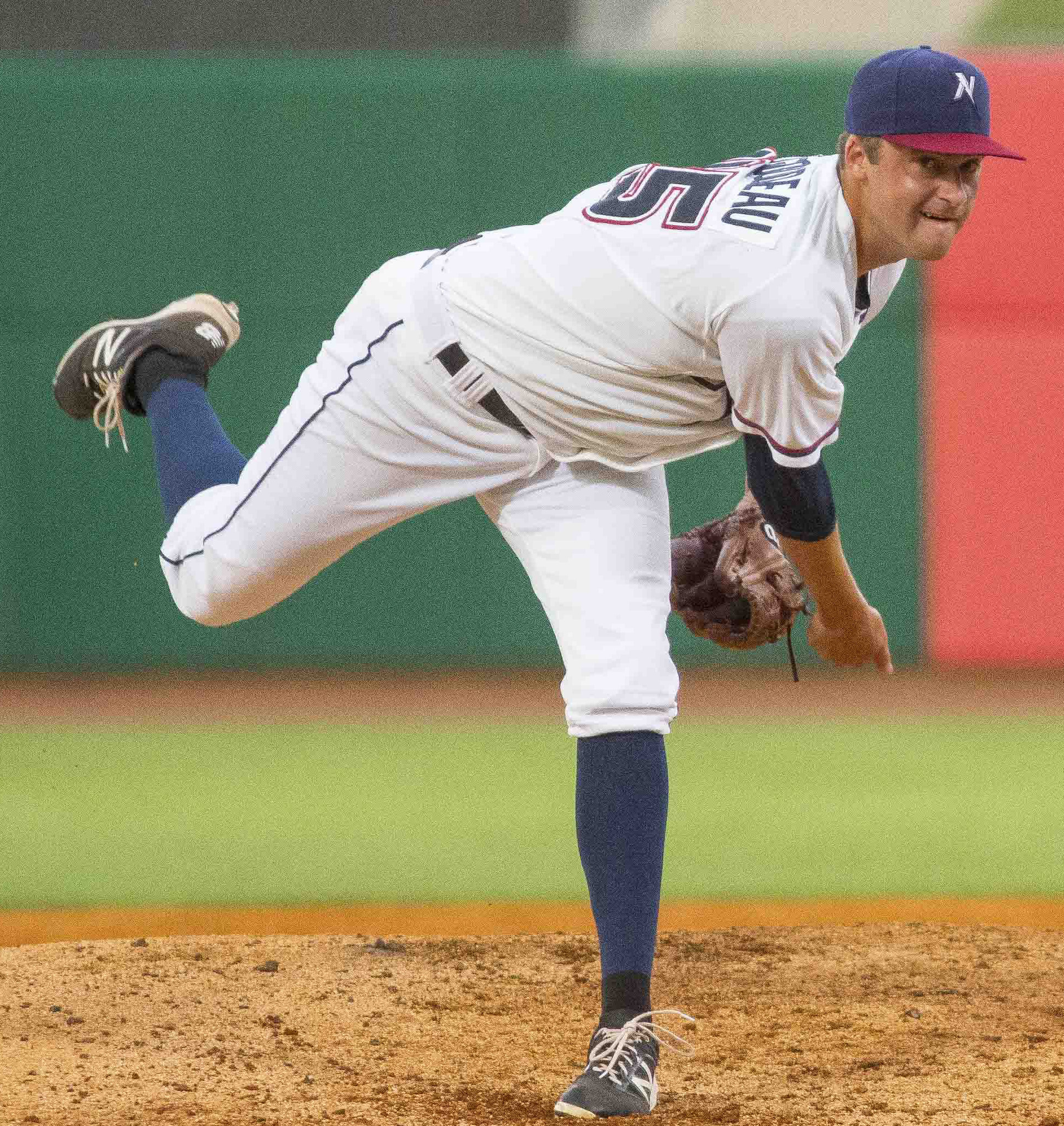
Goudeau with the Northwest Arkansas Naturals in 2016

Goudeau split the 2016 season between Wilmington and the Northwest Arkansas Naturals, going 7–17 with a 5.29 ERA over 127 2/3 innings. He split the 2017 season between the AZL and Northwest Arkansas, going a combined 3–7 with a 5.10 ERA over 60 innings.

=== Seattle Mariners ===
On March 22, 2018, Goudeau, David McKay, Matt Tenuta, and Colin Rodgers were traded to the Seattle Mariners in exchange for $1. He split the 2018 season between the Modesto Nuts, Arkansas Travelers, and Tacoma Rainiers, going 6–11 with a 5.79 ERA over 102 2/3 innings. On November 2, Goudeau elected free agency.

=== Colorado Rockies ===
On November 16, 2018, Goudeau signed a minor league contract with the Colorado Rockies organization. He abandoned his ineffective slider, and focused on his plus curveball.

He spent the 2019 season with the Hartford Yard Goats, producing a 3–3 record with a 2.07 ERA over 78 innings with 91 strikeouts (10.5 strikeouts per nine innings), as he held batters to a .215 batting average. Goudeau played in the Arizona Fall League for the Salt River Rafters following the 2019 season, was 1–0 with a 0.00 ERA as in 13 innings he gave up four hits and no walks and had 18 strikeouts, and was named an AFL Rising Star. The Rockies added him to their 40-man roster after the 2019 season.

On July 23, 2020, Goudeau was promoted to the major leagues. He was optioned down on August 6 without appearing in a game for the Rockies. On August 17 he was recalled and made his major league debut on August 19 against the Houston Astros, ultimately pitching 8.1 innings for the Rockies in 2020. On November 20, 2020, Goudeau was designated for assignment.

On November 25, 2020, Goudeau was claimed off waivers by the Pittsburgh Pirates. He was then claimed by the Baltimore Orioles on December 7, 2020, the San Francisco Giants on March 18, 2021, and the Los Angeles Dodgers on April 10, 2021. On April 18, he returned to the Rockies on another waiver claim after the Dodgers designated him earlier in the day. On April 29, 2021, Goudeau was again designated for assignment by the Rockies.

=== Cincinnati Reds ===
On May 2, 2021, Goudeau was claimed off waivers by the Cincinnati Reds. On May 23, Goudeau made his first appearance of the year, pitching 2.1 hitless innings against the Milwaukee Brewers. In 5 games for the Reds, Goudeau posted an ERA of 4.00 with 5 strikeouts. On July 21, Goudeau was optioned to the Triple-A Louisville Bats. On July 28, Goudeau was designated for assignment by the Reds.

=== Colorado Rockies (second stint) ===
On July 29, 2021, Goudeau was traded back to the Colorado Rockies in exchange for cash considerations. On August 1, Goudeau collected his first career hit with a single off of San Diego Padres pitcher Reiss Knehr. He finished the year appearing in 11 games, posting a 2–1 record and 4.26 ERA with 17 strikeouts in 25 1/3 innings pitched.

In 2022, Goudeau made 12 appearances for Colorado, struggling to a 1–0 record and 7.08 ERA with one save and 16 strikeouts in 20 1/3 innings of work, On August 5, 2022, Goudeau was designated for assignment by the Rockies. He cleared waivers and was sent outright to the Triple-A Albuquerque Isotopes on August 7. He elected free agency following the season on November 10.

=== Detroit Tigers ===
On February 23, 2023, Goudeau signed a minor league contract with the Detroit Tigers organization. He struggled to a 7.42 ERA in 18 games (14 starts) for the Triple–A Toledo Mud Hens, and briefly missed time due to an Achilles injury. Goudeau was released by Detroit on August 10.

=== Kansas City Monarchs ===
On August 16, 2023, Goudeau signed with the Kansas City Monarchs of the American Association of Professional Baseball. In three starts for the club, he logged a 2–1 record and 2.57 ERA with 15 strikeouts across 14 innings of work. In September 2023, Goudeau was loaned to the AAPB's Fargo-Moorhead RedHawks to participate in the 2023 Baseball Champions League Americas, which the RedHawks won.

On April 24, 2024, Goudeau re-signed with the Monarchs. In two starts for the club, he logged a 1–0 record and 0.90 ERA with 6 strikeouts across 10 innings of work.

=== El Águila de Veracruz ===
On May 20, 2024, Goudeau’s contract was transferred to El Águila de Veracruz of the Mexican League. In 7 starts for Veracruz, he logged a 4.88 ERA with 31 strikeouts across 24 innings of work.

=== Rieleros de Aguascalientes ===
On July 22, 2024, Goudeau was traded to the Rieleros de Aguascalientes of the Mexican League. In 2 starts for Aguascalientes, he struggled to an 0–1 record and 8.59 ERA with 7 strikeouts across 7 1/3 innings pitched. Goudeau was released by the Rieleros on October 22.

=== Kansas City Monarchs (second stint) ===
On April 7, 2025, Goudeau signed with the Kansas City Monarchs of the American Association of Professional Baseball. Goudeau made 18 starts for the Monarchs, accumulating a 5–5 record and 4.01 ERA with 72 strikeouts across 92 innings pitched.

=== Gastonia Ghost Peppers ===
On April 30, 2026, Goudeau signed with the Gastonia Ghost Peppers of the Atlantic League of Professional Baseball. In 10 starts, he posted a 2–3 record with a 8.49 ERA, 32 strikeouts, and 19 walks across 35 innings pitched. On July 2, 2026, Goudeau was released by Gastonia.
