= Yonathan Daza =

Venezuelan baseball player (born 1994)

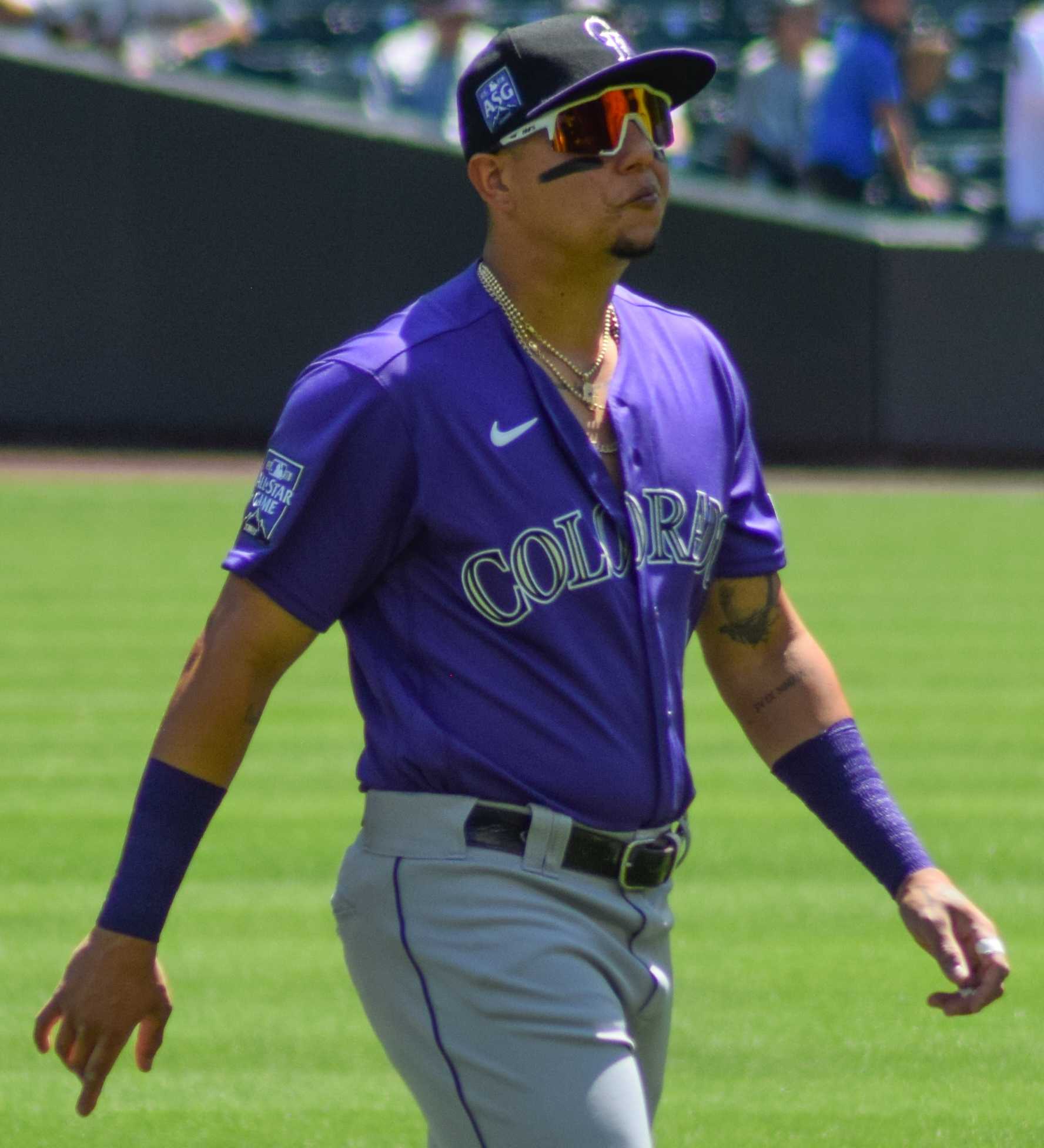
- Daza with the Colorado Rockies in 2021

Guerreros de Oaxaca – No. 31
- Outfielder
- Born: February 28, 1994 (age 32); Maracay, Venezuela
- Bats: Right Throws: Right

MLB debut
- April 9, 2019, for the Colorado Rockies

MLB statistics (through 2023 season)
- Batting average: .281
- Home runs: 4
- Runs batted in: 74
- Stats at Baseball Reference

Teams
- Colorado Rockies (2019, 2021–2023)

Yonathan Daza (born February 28, 1994) is a Venezuelan professional baseball outfielder for the Guerreros de Oaxaca of the Mexican League. He has previously played in Major League Baseball (MLB) for the Colorado Rockies.

== Career ==
=== Colorado Rockies ===
Daza signed with the Colorado Rockies as an international free agent in October 2010. He spent his first three professional seasons (2011-2013) playing for the Rookie-level DSL Rockies. He played for the Rookie-level Grand Junction Rockies in 2014, hitting .370/.415/.490/.905 with 4 home runs and 35 RBI. He split 2015 between the Low-A Boise Hawks and the Single-A Asheville Tourists, accumulating a .325/.358/.451/.809 batting line with 3 home runs and 53 RBI. He split his 2016 season between Asheville and the High–A Modesto Nuts, hitting a combined .303/.338/.402./740 with 3 home runs and 61 RBI. He spent 2017 with the High–A Lancaster JetHawks, hitting .341/.376/.466/.842 with 3 home runs and 87 RBI. Daza played for the Salt River Rafters of the Arizona Fall League after the 2017 regular season.

The Rockies added him to their 40-man roster after the 2017 season. He spent the 2018 season with the Double-A Hartford Yard Goats, hitting .306/.330/.461/.791 with 4 home runs and 29 RBI. He appeared in just 54 games in 2018 after suffering a left shoulder injury in late July of that season. Daza opened the 2019 season with the Triple-A Albuquerque Isotopes.

The Rockies promoted Daza to the major leagues for the first time on April 9, 2019, when David Dahl was placed on the injured list. Daza made his major league debut on the same day, versus the Atlanta Braves. Daza did not appear in a game for the Rockies in 2020, despite injuries to David Dahl and Ian Desmond's decision to opt out of the season due to the COVID-19 pandemic. For the majority of the 2021 season, Daza was the starting center fielder for Colorado up until his injury in August. He ended up hitting .282 with 2 home runs and 30 RBI in 107 games.

Daza played in 113 games for the Rockies in 2022, slashing .301/.349/.384 with 2 home runs and 34 RBI. In 24 games to begin the 2023 season, he batted .270/.304/.351 with no home runs and 7 RBI. On May 5, 2023, Daza was designated for assignment following the waiver claim of Austin Wynns. He cleared waivers and was sent outright to Triple-A Albuquerque on May 8. In 39 games for the Isotopes, Daza batted .305/.350/.415 with 2 home runs, 19 RBI, and 4 stolen bases. He elected free agency following the season on November 6.

=== Tecolotes de los Dos Laredos ===
On February 21, 2024, Daza signed with the Tecolotes de los Dos Laredos of the Mexican League. In 27 games for Dos Laredos, Daza hit .291/.324/.320 with no home runs and 12 RBI.

=== Guerreros de Oaxaca ===
On May 19, 2024, Daza was traded to the Guerreros de Oaxaca of the Mexican League. In 58 games for Oaxaca, he batted .329/.356/.462 with four home runs, 38 RBI, and seven stolen bases.

In 2025, Daza re-signed with Oaxaca for a second season. In 84 games he hit .359/.414/.490 with 5 home runs, 47 RBIs and 7 stolen bases.
