= Bill Schmidt (baseball) =

American baseball executive (born 1959)

- General manager
- Born: August 1959 (age 66)

Teams
- Colorado Rockies (1999–2025)

William E. Schmidt (born August 1959) is an American professional baseball executive who currently serves as a special assistant for the Athletics of Major League Baseball (MLB). He served as the general manager for the Colorado Rockies from 2021 to 2025. He has also served as a coach and talent scout.

== Early life and education ==
Schmidt graduated from Magnolia High School in Anaheim, California, in 1981. He earned his bachelor's degree from California State University, Long Beach. His first job after graduating was as the head coach of Magnolia High's baseball team. As he shifted into coaching college baseball, he earned a master's degree from Azusa Pacific University.

== Career ==
Schmidt served as a scout for the Cleveland Indians, New York Yankees, Cincinnati Reds, and the Major League Baseball scouting bureau. He joined the Rockies organization in 1999. The Rockies named him their interim general manager on May 3, 2021, following the resignation of Jeff Bridich. On October 2, the Rockies hired Schmidt as their general manager. On October 1, 2025, the Rockies announced that Schmidt would not return to the organization in 2026.

On January 14, 2026, the Athletics hired Schmidt to serve as a special assistant in their scouting department.
