= Dom Núñez =

American baseball player (born 1995)

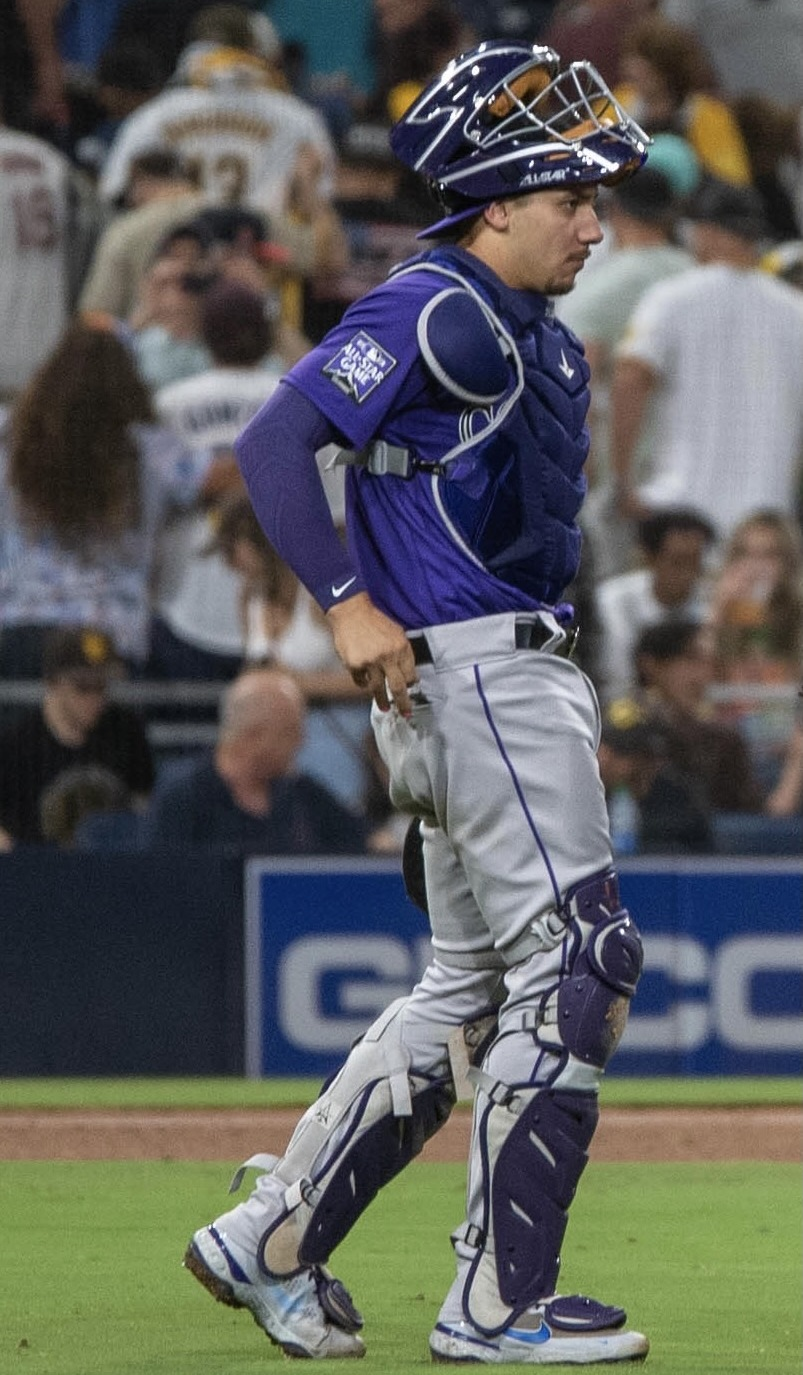
- Núñez with the Rockies in 2021

Free agent
- Catcher
- Born: January 17, 1995 (age 31); Elk Grove, California, U.S.
- Bats: Left Throws: Right

MLB debut
- August 13, 2019, for the Colorado Rockies

MLB statistics (through 2025 season)
- Batting average: .182
- Home runs: 12
- Runs batted in: 39
- Stats at Baseball Reference

Teams
- Colorado Rockies (2019, 2021–2022); Cleveland Guardians (2025)
Medals
Men's baseball
Representing United States
18U Baseball World Championship
Gold medal – first place	2012 Seoul	Team

Dominic Manuel Núñez (born January 17, 1995) is an American professional baseball catcher who is a free agent. He has previously played in Major League Baseball (MLB) for the Colorado Rockies and Cleveland Guardians. He was selected by the Rockies in the sixth round of the 2013 MLB draft, and he made his MLB debut with them in 2019.

== Amateur career ==
Núñez was drafted by the Rockies in the sixth round of the 2013 Major League Baseball draft out of Elk Grove High School in Elk Grove, California, for whom he had played shortstop on the baseball team. He committed to play college baseball at UCLA, but chose to sign with the Rockies instead of attending college.

== Professional career ==
=== Colorado Rockies ===
After signing with the Rockies, he was assigned to the Grand Junction Rockies to begin his professional career; he spent the whole 2013 season there, batting .200/.269/.323 in 195 at-bats with 24 runs, three home runs, and 23 RBI in 55 games, while primarily playing second base and shortstop. He returned to Grand Junction in 2014 and greatly improved, slashing .313/.384/.517 in 176 at-bats with eight home runs and 40 RBI in 46 games, while playing catcher.

In 2015, Núñez played for the Asheville Tourists where he batted .282/.373/.448 in 373 at-bats with 61 runs, 13 home runs, and 53 RBI in 104 games, as on defense he caught 21% of runners. Núñez spent 2016 with the Modesto Nuts where he batted .241/.321/.362 in 390 at-bats with ten home runs and 51 RBI in 105 games, as on defense he caught 43% of runners. He was named a 2015 MiLB.com Organization All-Star.

Núñez played in 2017 with the Double-A Hartford Yard Goats where he batted .202/.335/.354 with 37 runs, 11 home runs, and 28 RBI in 95 games. In 2018, he returned to Hartford, batting .222/.320/.343 in 377 at-bats with nine home runs and 42 RBI in 92 games. He began 2019 with the Albuquerque Isotopes.

On August 13, 2019, the Rockies selected Núñez's contract and promoted him to the major leagues for the first time. He made his debut that night versus the Arizona Diamondbacks, and hit a home run off Yoan López for his first MLB hit.

In 2019 with Albuquerque, Núñez batted .244/.362/.559 in 213 at-bats, with 43 runs, 14 doubles, 17 home runs, and 42 RBI. He was named a 2015 MiLB.com Organization All-Star. With the Rockies he batted 7-for-43.

While Núñez did not appear in a game for the Rockies in the shortened 2020 season, he was named to the team's 2021 Opening Day roster. He served as the Rockies backup catcher throughout the season, hitting .189/.293/.399 in 288 at-bats, with 10 home runs and 33 RBI in 81 games.

In 2022 with Albuquerque, Núñez batted .223/.319/.360 in 247 at-bats, with 39 runs, five home runs, and 29 RBI, as on defense he caught 22% of runners. With the Rockies, he batted 4-for-33.

=== San Francisco Giants ===
On November 9, 2022, Núñez was claimed off waivers by the San Francisco Giants. On November 15, Núñez was designated for assignment by the Giants after they protected multiple prospects from the Rule 5 draft. On November 18, he was non–tendered and became a free agent.

=== Chicago Cubs ===
On January 3, 2023, Núñez signed a minor league contract with the Chicago Cubs. In 45 games for the Triple–A Iowa Cubs, he batted .216/.368/.366 with four home runs, 21 RBI, and four stolen bases. On August 6, Núñez was released by the Cubs organization.

=== Pittsburgh Pirates ===
On August 8, 2023, Núñez signed a minor league contract with the Pittsburgh Pirates organization. In 18 games for the Triple–A Indianapolis Indians, he batted .119/.224/.186 with one home run and one RBI. Núñez elected free agency following the season on November 6.

=== Cleveland Guardians ===
On January 30, 2024, Núñez signed a minor league contract with the Cleveland Guardians. In 68 games for the Triple–A Columbus Clippers, he slashed .202/.330/.339 with five home runs and 19 RBI. Núñez elected free agency following the season on November 4.

On December 16, 2024, Núñez re–signed with Cleveland on a new minor league contract. In 32 games for Triple-A Columbus, he hit .136 with six home runs and 16 RBI. On June 6, 2025, Núñez was added to Cleveland's active roster after Austin Hedges suffered a concussion. He played in two games for the Guardians, going 2-for-7 (.286). On November 6, Núñez was removed from the 40-man roster and sent outright to Columbus; he subsequently rejected the assignment and elected free agency.

On January 7, 2026, Núñez re-signed with the Guardians on another minor league contract. In 43 games with Triple-A Columbus Clippers he batted .187/.320/.293 with 3 home runs, 17 RBIs and 4 stolen bases. He elected free agency on November 2.
