= Jordan Sheffield =

American baseball player (born 1995)

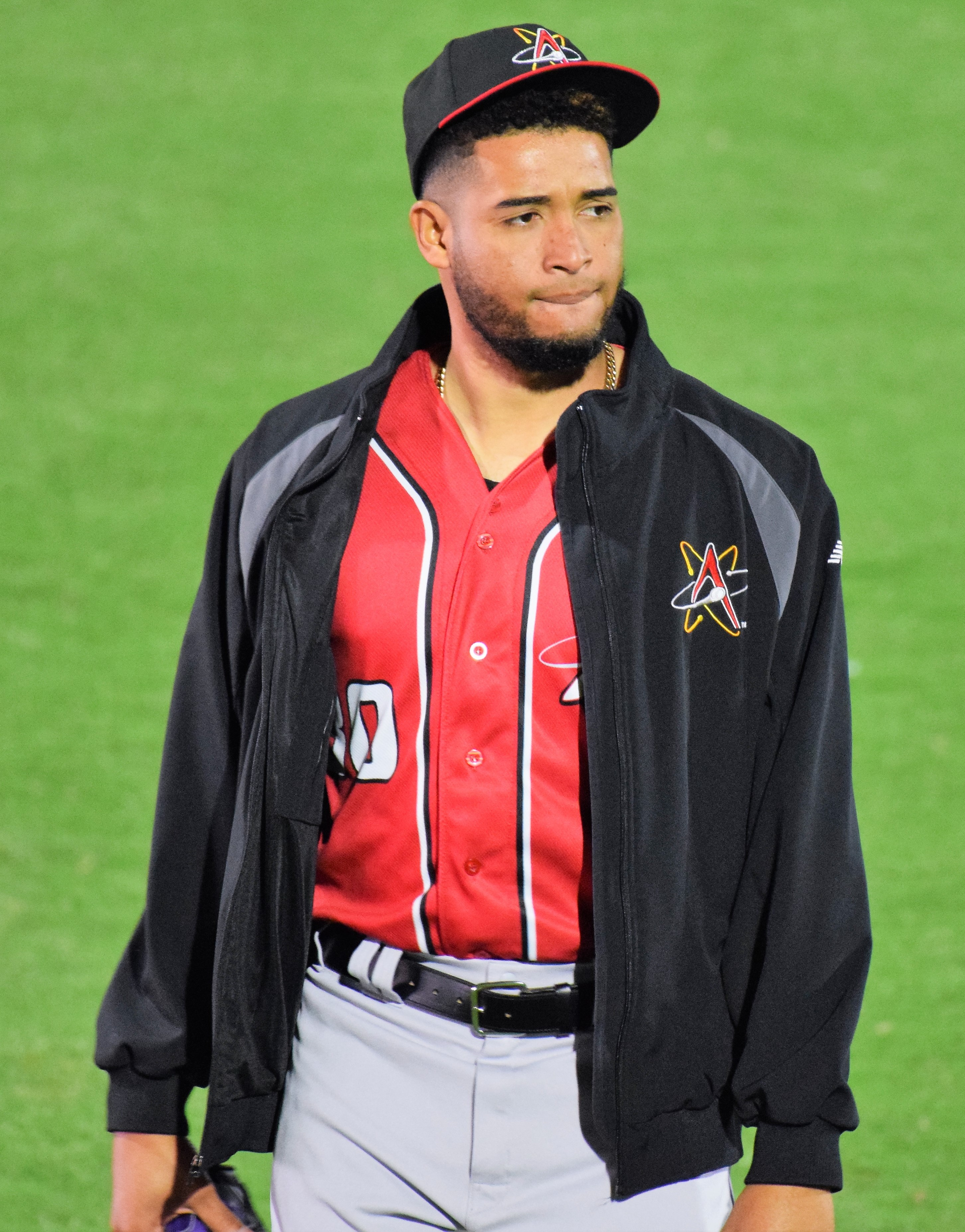
- Sheffield with the Albuquerque Isotopes in 2022
- Pitcher
- Born: June 1, 1995 (age 31); Tullahoma, Tennessee, U.S.
- Batted: Right Threw: Right

MLB debut
- April 2, 2021, for the Colorado Rockies

Last MLB appearance
- August 1, 2022, for the Colorado Rockies

MLB statistics
- Win–loss record: 0–0
- Earned run average: 3.16
- Strikeouts: 21
- Stats at Baseball Reference

Teams
- Colorado Rockies (2021–2022)

Jordan Ladon Sheffield (born June 1, 1995) is an American former professional baseball pitcher who currently serves as an assistant coach for the Vanderbilt Commodores of the National Collegiate Athletic Association (NCAA). He played college baseball at Vanderbilt, and played in Major League Baseball (MLB) for the Colorado Rockies.

== Playing career ==
=== Amateur career ===
Sheffield attended Tullahoma High School in Tullahoma, Tennessee. Before graduating, it was discovered that he needed Tommy John surgery, which caused him to fall in the Major League Baseball draft. He was selected by the Boston Red Sox in the 13th round of the 2013 Major League Baseball draft, but did not sign and chose to attend Vanderbilt University. After sitting out the 2014 season recovering from surgery, Sheffield made 6 starts and 16 relief appearances for Vanderbilt in 2015. In 60 total innings, he would post a 5–2 win–loss record, 2.85 earned run average (ERA), and 55 strikeouts. After the 2015 season, he played collegiate summer baseball with the Brewster Whitecaps of the Cape Cod Baseball League. Sheffield made 16 starts in the 2016 season, and pitched to an 8–6 record, 3.01 ERA, and 113 strikeouts in 101 2/3 innings.

=== Los Angeles Dodgers ===
Heading into the 2016 Major League Baseball draft, Sheffield was ranked as one of the top available players by MLB, and he was drafted by the Los Angeles Dodgers in the first round (36th pick). He announced on June 25 that he had signed with the Dodgers. Sheffield made one start for the rookie-level Arizona League Dodgers and seven for the Single-A Great Lakes Loons. He was 0–1 with a 3.75 ERA in 12 innings.

Sheffield returned to Great Lakes to start the 2017 season, where he made 20 starts and was 3–7 with a 5.04 ERA. He was promoted to the Rancho Cucamonga Quakes of the California League at the end of the season, where he made four starts and one relief appearance and was 0–2 with an 8.00 ERA. He returned to the Quakes for the 2018 season, pitching to a 1–3 record with a 6.88 ERA in 14 games, including seven starts. While playing for the Glendale Desert Dogs after the season, he was selected to the Arizona Fall League Fall Stars game.

Sheffield returned to Rancho Cucamonga to begin 2019 before being promoted to the Tulsa Drillers during the season. Between the two levels, he pitched in 49 games with a 4–5 record and 3.27 ERA with 13 saves. Sheffield did not play in a game in 2020 due to the cancellation of the minor league season because of the COVID-19 pandemic.

=== Colorado Rockies ===
On December 10, 2020, Sheffield was selected by the Colorado Rockies in the Rule 5 Draft. Sheffield made the Rockies' 2021 Opening Day roster. On April 2, 2021, Sheffield made his MLB debut in relief against the Los Angeles Dodgers, pitching a scoreless 9th inning. On June 20, he was placed on the 60-day injured list with a right lat strain. He ended the season with a 3.38 ERA in 30 appearances.

Sheffield pitched in only two games for Colorado in 2022, recording two scoreless innings. On August 12, 2022, Sheffield was designated for assignment. He cleared waivers and was sent outright to the Triple-A Albuquerque Isotopes on August 16. He was released on October 27.

== Coaching career ==
On January 29, 2025, Sheffield was hired to serve as an assistant coach for Vanderbilt University under head coach Tim Corbin.

== Personal life ==
His brother, Justus Sheffield, is also a major league pitcher. They are not related to former MLB slugger Gary Sheffield.

== See also ==
- Rule 5 draft results
