= Chi Chi González =

American baseball player (born 1992)

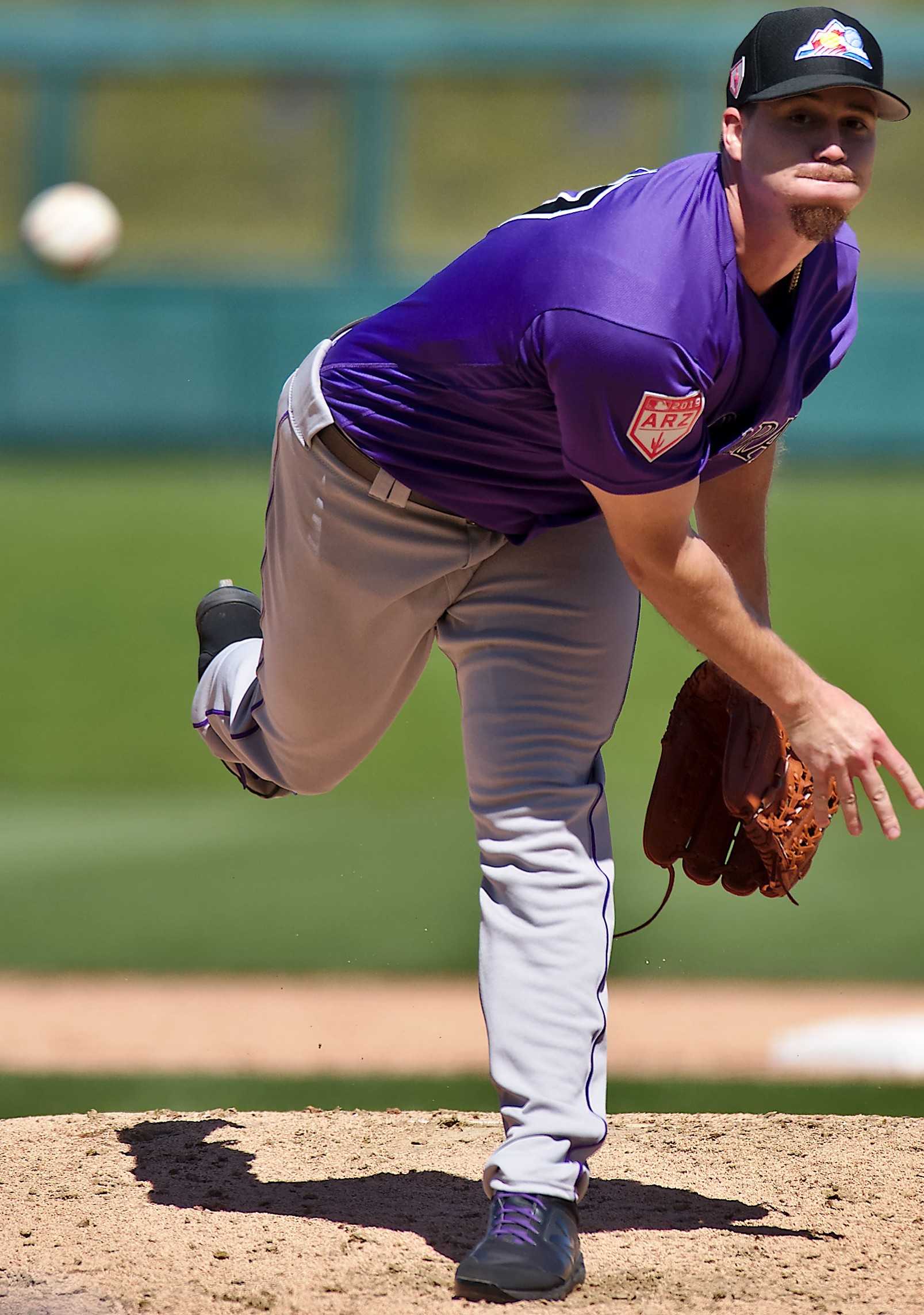
- Gonzalez with the Colorado Rockies during spring training in 2019
- Pitcher
- Born: January 15, 1992 (age 34); Delray Beach, Florida, U.S.
- Batted: Right Threw: Right

MLB debut
- May 30, 2015, for the Texas Rangers

Last MLB appearance
- September 17, 2023, for the Miami Marlins

MLB statistics
- Win–loss record: 9–24
- Earned run average: 5.68
- Strikeouts: 173
- Stats at Baseball Reference

Teams
- As player: Texas Rangers (2015–2016); Colorado Rockies (2019–2021); Minnesota Twins (2022); Milwaukee Brewers (2022); New York Yankees (2022); Miami Marlins (2023); As coach: Miami Marlins (2025)

Alexander Rios "Chi Chi" González (born January 15, 1992) is an American former professional pitcher and former bullpen catcher for the Miami Marlins of Major League Baseball (MLB). He played in MLB for the Texas Rangers, Colorado Rockies, Minnesota Twins, Milwaukee Brewers, New York Yankees, and the Marlins. González goes by Chi Chi, a nickname given to him by his grandfather.

== Playing career ==
=== Amateur career ===
Gonzalez attended Boca Raton Community High School in Boca Raton, Florida, and played for the school's baseball team as a pitcher and third baseman. The Baltimore Orioles selected Gonzalez in the 11th round of the 2010 Major League Baseball draft. Rather than sign with the Orioles, Gonzalez attended Oral Roberts University, where he played college baseball for the Oral Roberts Golden Eagles. In 2012, he played collegiate summer baseball in the Cape Cod Baseball League for the Yarmouth-Dennis Red Sox.

=== Texas Rangers ===
The Texas Rangers selected González in the first round, with the 23rd overall selection, of the 2013 Major League Baseball draft. He made his professional debut with the Spokane Indians and also played for the Myrtle Beach Pelicans. Prior to the 2014 season, Baseball Prospectus rated González as the 70th best prospect in baseball. He started the season with Myrtle Beach before being promoted to the Double-A Frisco RoughRiders. He started 2015 with the Triple-A Round Rock Express.

González was called up to the majors for the first time on May 30, 2015, and made his major league debut that day. He faced the veteran lineup of the Boston Red Sox and began the game pitching 5 2/3 innings without surrendering a hit. It was the longest no-hit stretch to begin a career for a Rangers pitcher since 1992. On June 5, González threw a complete-game shutout against the Kansas City Royals; it was his first career complete game. He made 14 appearances (10 starts) for the Rangers during his rookie campaign, compiling a 4-6 record and 3.90 ERA with 30 strikeouts over 67 innings of work.

González made three starts for the Rangers during the 2016 season, but struggled to an 0-2 record and 8.71 ERA with seven strikeouts across 10 1/3 innings pitched.

On March 17, 2017, González was diagnosed with a partial tear to the UCL; he subsequently received a platelet-rich plasma injection. On July 22, he was declared to need Tommy John surgery, ending his season and ruling him out for the entirety of the 2018 season as well. On December 1, González became a free agent after he was non-tendered by the Rangers.

On December 4, 2017, González re-signed with Texas on a minor league contract. During the year, he was able to make three scoreless rehab appearances for the rookie-level Arizona League Rangers and Low-A Spokane Indians. On November 2, 2018, González elected free agency.

=== Colorado Rockies ===
On December 4, 2018, González signed a minor league contract with the Colorado Rockies. On June 25, his contract was selected by the Rockies. In 2019, González pitched to a 5.29 earned run average over 14 games for the Rockies, with 46 strikeouts. In 2020 for the Rockies, González pitched to a 6.86 ERA with 16 strikeouts in 19 2/3 innings pitched. On December 2, González was non-tendered by the Rockies, and became a free agent.

On December 11, 2020, González re-signed with the Rockies on a minor league contract. On March 27, 2021, González was selected to the 40-man roster. González made 24 appearances for the Rockies, going 3–7 with a 6.46 earned run average and 56 strikeouts. On October 3, the Rockies designated González for assignment. On October 8, González elected free agency.

=== Minnesota Twins ===
On March 18, 2022, González signed a minor league contract with the Minnesota Twins. He had his contract selected on June 3, and was returned to Triple-A on June 4. On June 10, González triggered the opt-out clause in his contract, giving Minnesota until the weekend to add him to the 40-man roster or release him. The next day, González was selected to the active roster to start against the Tampa Bay Rays. He lasted four innings, giving up three earned runs on eight hits while striking out three, and was designated for assignment following the game.

=== Milwaukee Brewers ===
On June 14, 2022, Gonzalez was claimed off waivers by the Milwaukee Brewers after having been designated for assignment by the Minnesota Twins. He made his first start for Milwaukee on June 21, 2022. In 4 games (2 starts) for Milwaukee, Gonzalez registered a 6.35 ERA with 8 strikeouts in 11.1 innings pitched. He was designated for assignment on July 12. He cleared waivers and was sent outright to the Triple-A Nashville Sounds on July 16. However, González rejected the assignment and elected free agency.

=== Detroit Tigers ===
On July 22, 2022, Gonzalez signed a minor league deal with the Tigers and assigned him to the Toledo Mud Hens. On August 26, 2022, he opted out of the minor league contract and was released.

=== New York Yankees ===
On August 30, 2022, Gonzalez signed a minor league deal with the New York Yankees. He was called up and made his first start on October 2, against the Baltimore Orioles. He was designated for assignment on October 3, and assigned the Scranton/Wilkes-Barre RailRiders. On October 24, Gonzalez elected free agency.

=== Miami Marlins ===
On December 15, 2022, Gonzalez signed a minor league contract with the Miami Marlins. He began the 2023 season with the Triple-A Jacksonville Jumbo Shrimp, making 6 starts and registering a 2-2 record and 4.54 ERA with 18 strikeouts in 33 2/3 innings pitched. On May 4, 2023, Gonzalez had his contract selected to the active roster. In two relief appearances for Miami, Gonzalez surrendered one run on four hits with two strikeouts in 2 2/3 innings pitched. He was designated for assignment on May 12, following the promotion of Eury Pérez. He cleared waivers and was sent outright to Jacksonville on May 14. On September 17, Gonzalez had his contract selected back to the major league roster. He was designated for assignment for a second time on September 20. Gonzalez again cleared waivers and was outrighted to Jacksonville on September 23. He elected free agency on October 15.

== Coaching career ==
Prior to the 2025 season, González joined the Miami Marlins as a bullpen catcher. On November 21, 2025, it was announced that González would not be returning to the team for the 2026 campaign.

== Personal life ==
Gonzalez is of Cuban descent.
