= 2022 Milwaukee Brewers season =

2022 Milwaukee Brewers
- League: National League
- Division: Central
- Ballpark: American Family Field
- City: Milwaukee, Wisconsin
- Record: 86–76 (.531)
- Divisional place: 2nd
- Owners: Mark Attanasio
- General managers: Matt Arnold
- Managers: Craig Counsell
- Television: Bally Sports Wisconsin (Brian Anderson, Bill Schroeder, Jeff Levering) Telemundo Wisconsin (Spanish-language coverage, Sunday home games; Jaime Cano, Kevin Holden)
- Radio: 620 WTMJ; Milwaukee Brewers Radio Network (Bob Uecker, Jeff Levering, Lane Grindle, Josh Maurer)
- Stats: ESPN.com; Baseball Reference

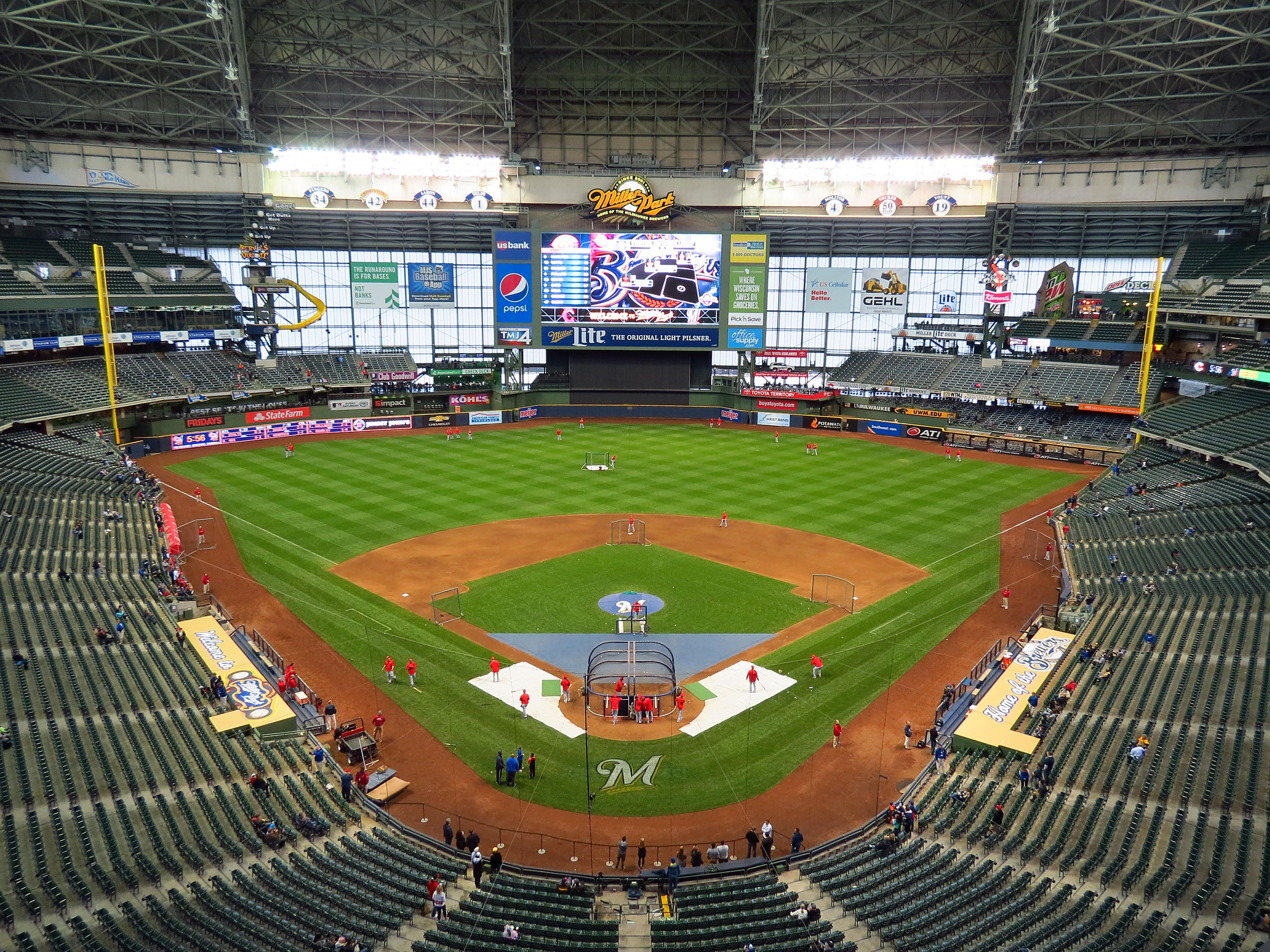
Cincinnati Reds at Milwaukee Brewers

The 2022 Milwaukee Brewers season was the 53rd season for the Brewers in Milwaukee, the 25th in the National League, and 54th overall.

On December 2, 2021, Commissioner of Baseball Rob Manfred announced a lockout of players, following expiration of the collective bargaining agreement (CBA) between the league and the Major League Baseball Players Association (MLBPA). On March 10, 2022, MLB and the MLBPA agreed to a new collective bargaining agreement, thus ending the lockout. Opening Day was played on April 7. Although MLB previously announced that several series would be cancelled due to the lockout, the agreement provides for a 162-game season, with originally canceled games to be made up via doubleheaders.

Despite having a three-game lead in the National League Central, when the team traded Josh Hader to the San Diego Padres, the team faltered, losing 31 of their final 60 games and being eliminated from playoff contention for the first time since 2017 on October 3.

== Offseason ==
=== Lockout ===
The expiration of the league's collective bargaining agreement (CBA) with the Major League Baseball Players Association occurred on December 1, 2021 with no new agreement in place. As a result, the team owners voted unanimously to lockout the players stopping all free agency and trades.

The parties came to an agreement on a new CBA on March 10, 2022.

=== Rule changes ===
Pursuant to the new CBA, several new rules were instituted for the 2022 season. The National League will adopt the designated hitter full-time, a draft lottery will be implemented, the postseason will expand from ten teams to twelve, and advertising patches will appear on player uniforms and helmets for the first time.

== Season standings ==
=== National League Central ===
NL Central
Team	W	L	Pct.	GB	Home	Road
St. Louis Cardinals	93	69	.574	—	53‍–‍28	40‍–‍41
Milwaukee Brewers	86	76	.531	7	46‍–‍35	40‍–‍41
Chicago Cubs	74	88	.457	19	37‍–‍44	37‍–‍44
Pittsburgh Pirates	62	100	.383	31	34‍–‍47	28‍–‍53
Cincinnati Reds	62	100	.383	31	33‍–‍48	29‍–‍52

=== National League Wild Card ===
Division leaders
Team	W	L	Pct.
Los Angeles Dodgers	111	51	.685
Atlanta Braves	101	61	.623
St. Louis Cardinals	93	69	.574

Wild Card teams (Top 3 teams qualify for postseason)
Team	W	L	Pct.	GB
New York Mets	101	61	.623	+14
San Diego Padres	89	73	.549	+2
Philadelphia Phillies	87	75	.537	—
Milwaukee Brewers	86	76	.531	1
San Francisco Giants	81	81	.500	6
Arizona Diamondbacks	74	88	.457	13
Chicago Cubs	74	88	.457	13
Miami Marlins	69	93	.426	18
Colorado Rockies	68	94	.420	19
Pittsburgh Pirates	62	100	.383	25
Cincinnati Reds	62	100	.383	25
Washington Nationals	55	107	.340	32

=== Record vs. opponents ===
2022 National League record Source: MLB Standings Grid – 2022
Team	AZ	ATL	CHC	CIN	COL	LAD	MIA	MIL	NYM	PHI	PIT	SD	SF	STL	WSH	AL
Arizona	—	2–4	4–3	3–4	9–10	5–14	5–1	4–3	2–4	3–3	4–3	5–14	10–9	2–5	4–3	12–8
Atlanta	4–2	—	3–3	4–3	6–1	2–4	13–6	3–3	10–9	11–8	7–0	3–4	4–3	4–3	14–5	13–7
Chicago	3–4	3–3	—	11–8	3–4	0–7	4–2	10–9	4–3	6–0	10–9	2–5	2–5	6–13	4–2	6–14
Cincinnati	4–3	3–4	8–11	—	2–4	0–7	4–3	6–13	1–5	1–6	7–12	0–6	4–2	7–12	3–4	12–8
Colorado	10–9	1–6	4–3	4–2	—	8–11	2–4	3–4	2–5	2–5	3–3	10–9	5–14	2–4	3–4	9–11
Los Angeles	14–5	4–2	7–0	7–0	11–8	—	6–1	4–3	3–4	3–4	1–5	14–5	15–4	4–2	3–3	15–5
Miami	1–5	6–13	2–4	3–4	4–2	1–6	—	4–3	6–13	7–12	4–3	3–4	3–4	2–4	15–4	8–12
Milwaukee	3–4	3–3	9–10	13–6	4–3	3–4	3–4	—	2–4	2–4	11–8	3–4	3–4	9–10	3–3	15–5
New York	4–2	9–10	3–4	5–1	5–2	4–3	13–6	4–2	—	14–5	6–1	2–4	4–3	5–2	14–5	9–11
Philadelphia	3–3	8–11	0–6	6–1	5–2	4–3	12–7	4–2	5–14	—	6–1	4–3	1–5	4–3	16–3	9–11
Pittsburgh	3–4	0–7	9–10	12–7	3–3	5–1	3–4	8–11	1–6	1–6	—	2–4	1–5	6–13	4–3	4–16
San Diego	14–5	4–3	5–2	6–0	9–10	5–14	4–3	4–3	4–2	3–4	4–2	—	13–6	2–4	4–3	8–12
San Francisco	9–10	3–4	5–2	2–4	14–5	4–15	4–3	4–3	3–4	5–1	5–1	6–13	—	3–4	4–2	10–10
St. Louis	5–2	3–4	13–6	12–7	4–2	2–4	4–2	10–9	2–5	3–4	13–6	4–2	4–3	—	4–3	10–10
Washington	3–4	5–14	2–4	4–3	4–3	3–3	4–15	3–3	5–14	3–16	3–4	3–4	2–4	3–4	—	8–12

Updated with the results of all games through October 5, 2022.

== Roster ==
2022 Milwaukee Brewers
Roster
Pitchers: 41 Jason Alexander; 26 Aaron Ashby; 49 Luke Barker; 45 Brad Boxberger; 39 Corbin Burnes; 50 Matt Bush; 54 Jake Cousins; 21 Chi Chi Gonzalez; 48 Trevor Gott; 31 Jandel Gustave; 71 Josh Hader; 37 Adrian Houser; 57 Trevor Kelley; 52 Eric Lauer; 21 Jake McGee; 36 J. C. Mejía; 55 Hoby Milner; 51 Freddy Peralta; 46 Luis Perdomo; 25 Taylor Rogers; 59 Connor Sadzeck; 58 Miguel Sánchez; 43 Ethan Small; 32 Peter Strzelecki; 35 Brent Suter; 56 Justin Topa; 32 José Ureña; 38 Devin Williams; 53 Brandon Woodruff	Catchers: 7 Víctor Caratini; 0 Mario Feliciano; 5 Alex Jackson; 10 Omar Narváez; 28 Pedro Severino; Infielders: 27 Willy Adames; 20 Mike Brosseau; 18 Keston Hiura; 13 Mark Mathias; 14 Jace Peterson; 33 Pablo Reyes; 11 Rowdy Tellez; 2 Luis Urías; 16 Kolten Wong	Outfielders: 6 Lorenzo Cain; 3 Jonathan Davis; 24 Andrew McCutchen; 5 Garrett Mitchell; 12 Hunter Renfroe; 13 Esteury Ruiz; 15 Tyrone Taylor; 22 Christian Yelich	Manager: 30 Craig Counsell; Coaches: 23 Quintin Berry (first base coach); 65 Néstor Corredor (bullpen catcher); 70 Connor Dawson (hitting); 68 Matt Erickson (infield instructor, assistant hitting); 61 Jim Henderson (bullpen); 84 Chris Hook (pitching); 40 Jason Lane (third base coach); 60 Walker McKinven (associate pitching, catching, strategy); 00 Pat Murphy (bench); 99 Ozzie Timmons (hitting); 62 Adam Weisenburger (bullpen catcher)

== Transactions ==
=== April ===
- On April 7, traded Hayden Cantrelle to Miami Marlins for Alex Jackson.
- On April 13, traded Jamie Westbrook to Detroit Tigers for cash.
- On April 19, traded Dustin Peterson to Philadelphia Phillies for cash.
- On April 23, sent Luis Urias on rehab assignment to Double-A Biloxi.
- On April 29, placed Victor Caratini on 10-day injured list, recalled Alex Jackson from Triple-A Nashville.

=== May ===
- On May 1, activated Victor Caratini from 10-day injured list, placed Jake Cousins on 10-day injured list.
- On May 2, optioned Mike Brosseau to Triple-A Nashville, optioned Alex Jackson to Triple-A Nashville, designated Jose Urena for assignment, activated Luis Urias.
- On May 6, selected Luis Perdomo from Triple-A Nashville, optioned Keston Hiura to Triple-A Nashville.
- On May 7, recalled Mike Brosseau from Triple-A Nashville, placed Andrew McCutchen on 10-day injured list.
- On May 9, sent Jose Urena to Triple-A Nashville, activated Alec Bettinger.
- On May 10, recalled J.C. Mejia from Triple-A Nashville, optioned Jandel Gustave to Triple-A Nashville.
- On May 13, recalled Jandel Gustave from Triple-A Nashville, placed Brent Suter on paternity list.
- On May 16, activated Brent Suter from paternity list, placed Jandel Gustave on 15-day injured list.
- On May 17, selected Trevor Kelley from Triple-A Nashville, placed J.C. Mejia on restricted list.
- On May 18, recalled Keston Hiura from Triple-A Nashville, placed Willy Adames on 10-day injured list.
- On May 19, sent Alec Bettinger to Triple-A Nashville.
- On May 20, optioned Trevor Kelley to Triple-A Nashville, activated Andrew McCutchen from 10-day injured list.

== Game log ==
=== Regular season ===
2022 regular season game log: 86–76 (Home: 46–35; Away: 40–41)
April: 15–7 (Home: 7–3; Away: 8–4)

#	Date	Opponent	Score	Win	Loss	Save	Attendance	Record	Box/ Streak
1	April 7	@ Cubs	4–5	Martin (1–0)	**Ashby** (0–1)	Robertson (1)	35,112	0–1	L1
—	April 8	@ Cubs	Postponed (inclement weather); Makeup: May 30						
2	April 9	@ Cubs	0–9	Steele (1–0)	**Woodruff** (0–1)	—	30,369	0–2	L2
3	April 10	@ Cubs	5–4	**Boxberger** (1–0)	Norris (0–1)	**Hader** (1)	32,858	1–2	W1
4	April 11	@ Orioles	0–2	Baumann (1–0)	**Houser** (0–1)	López (1)	44,461	1–3	L1
5	April 12	@ Orioles	5–4	**Milner** (1–0)	Bautista (0–1)	**Hader** (2)	11,814	2–3	W1
6	April 13	@ Orioles	4–2	**Boxberger** (2–0)	López (0–1)	**Hader** (3)	12,704	3–3	W2
7	April 14	Cardinals	5–1	**Woodruff** (1–1)	Wainwright (1–1)	—	42,794	4–3	W3
8	April 15	Cardinals	1–10	Mikolas (1–0)	**Peralta** (0–1)	—	26,874	4–4	L1
9	April 16	Cardinals	1–2	Matz (1–1)	**Houser** (0–2)	Gallegos (2)	26,356	4–5	L2
10	April 17	Cardinals	6–5	**Cousins** (1–0)	Hudson (0–1)	**Hader** (4)	23,001	5–5	W1
11	April 18	Pirates	6–1	**Lauer** (1–0)	Thompson (0–1)	—	21,512	6–5	W2
12	April 19	Pirates	5–2	**Burnes** (1–0)	Brubaker (0–2)	**Hader** (5)	22,747	7–5	W3
13	April 20	Pirates	4–2	**Woodruff** (2–1)	Keller (0–3)	**Hader** (6)	20,790	8–5	W4
14	April 22	@ Phillies	2–4	Nelson (1–0)	**Ashby** (0–2)	Knebel (3)	29,285	8–6	L1
15	April 23	@ Phillies	5–3	**Houser** (1–2)	Wheeler (0–3)	**Hader** (7)	30,612	9–6	W1
16	April 24	@ Phillies	1–0	**Williams** (1–0)	Knebel (0–1)	**Hader** (8)	26,175	10–6	W2
17	April 25	Giants	2–4	McGee (1–1)	**Cousins** (2–1)	Doval (4)	21,186	10–7	L1
18	April 26	@ Pirates	12–8	**Suter** (1–0)	Fletcher (0–1)	**Hader** (9)	8,493	11–7	W1
19	April 27	@ Pirates	3–1	**Gott** (1–0)	Crowe (1–1)	**Hader** (10)	8,331	12–7	W2
20	April 28	@ Pirates	3–2	**Milner** (2–0)	Stratton (0–1)	**Williams** (1)	8,332	13–7	W3
21	April 29	Cubs	11–1	**Houser** (2–2)	Hendricks (1–2)	—	29,062	14–7	W4
22	April 30	Cubs	9–1	**Lauer** (2–0)	Steele (1–3)	—	37,263	15–7	W5

May: 17–12 (Home: 7–3; Away: 10–9)

#	Date	Opponent	Score	Win	Loss	Save	Attendance	Record	Box/ Streak
23	May 1	Cubs	0–2	Stroman (1–3)	**Burnes** (1–1)	Robertson (5)	35,137	15–8	L1
24	May 3	Reds	6–3	**Woodruff** (3–1)	Mahle (1–4)	**Williams** (2)	21,961	16–8	W1
25	May 4	Reds	18–4	**Peralta** (1–1)	Gutiérrez (0–5)	—	25,413	17–8	W2
26	May 5	Reds	10–5	**Houser** (3–2)	Greene (1–4)	—	21,715	18–8	W3
27	May 6	@ Braves	6–3	**Lauer** (3–0)	McHugh (0–1)	**Hader** (11)	36,307	19–8	W4
28	May 7	@ Braves	2–3	Fried (4–2)	**Burnes** (1–2)	Jansen (8)	37,857	19–9	L1
29	May 8	@ Braves	2–9	Morton (2–3)	**Ashby** (0–3)	—	36,551	19–10	L2
30	May 9	@ Reds	5–10	Cessa (1–0)	**Woodruff** (3–2)	—	10,046	19–11	L3
31	May 10	@ Reds	5–4	**Peralta** (2–1)	Greene (1–5)	**Hader** (12)	10,445	20–11	W1
32	May 11	@ Reds	11–14	Díaz (1–0)	**Houser** (3–3)	—	11,851	20–12	L1
33	May 13	@ Marlins	2–1	**Williams** (2–0)	Scott (0–1)	**Hader** (13)	9,110	21–12	W1
34	May 14	@ Marlins	3–9	Rogers (2–4)	**Lauer** (3–1)	—	12,941	21–13	L1
35	May 15	@ Marlins	7–3	**Woodruff** (4–2)	Hernández (2–3)	**Ashby** (1)	11,729	22–13	W1
36	May 16	Braves	1–0	**Peralta** (3–1)	Anderson (3–2)	**Hader** (14)	25,880	23–13	W2
37	May 17	Braves	0–3	Davidson (1–0)	**Houser** (3–4)	Jansen (9)	28,910	23–14	L1
38	May 18	Braves	7–6 (11)	**Kelley** (1–0)	Chavez (0–1)	—	27,014	24–14	W1
39	May 20	Nationals	7–0	**Lauer** (4–1)	Fedde (2–3)	—	29,609	25–14	W2
40	May 21	Nationals	5–1	**Woodruff** (5–2)	Corbin (0–7)	**Hader** (15)	34,837	26–14	W3
41	May 22	Nationals	2–8	Sanchez (3–3)	**Peralta** (3–2)	—	39,822	26–15	L1
42	May 23	@ Padres	2–3 (10)	García (3–2)	**Sánchez** (0–1)	—	31,504	26–16	L2
43	May 24	@ Padres	4–1	**Burnes** (2–2)	Snell (0–2)	**Williams** (3)	39,834	27–16	W1
44	May 25	@ Padres	2–1	**Perdomo** (1–0)	Darvish (4–2)	**Williams** (4)	27,831	28–16	W2
45	May 26	@ Cardinals	4–3	**Lauer** (5–1)	Wainwright (5–4)	**Hader** (16)	35,107	29–16	W3
46	May 27	@ Cardinals	2–4	VerHagen (2–0)	**Woodruff** (5–3)	Helsley (3)	39,077	29–17	L1
47	May 28	@ Cardinals	3–8	Liberatore (1–0)	**Houser** (3–5)	—	45,594	29–18	L1
48	May 29	@ Cardinals	8–0	**Burnes** (3–2)	Mikolas (3–3)	—	44,169	30–18	W1
49	May 30 (1)	@ Cubs	7–6	**Sánchez** (1–1)	Norris (0–3)	**Hader** (17)	39,305	31–18	W2
50	May 30 (2)	@ Cubs	3–1	**Ashby** (1–3)	Espinoza (0–1)	**Hader** (18)	28,620	32–18	W3
51	May 31	@ Cubs	7–8	Givens (4–0)	**Boxberger** (1–1)	Robertson (7)	30,596	32–19	L1

June: 12–15 (Home: 5–9; Away: 7–6)

#	Date	Opponent	Score	Win	Loss	Save	Attendance	Record	Box/ Streak
52	June 1	@ Cubs	3–4 (10)	Leiter Jr. (1–1)	**Milner** (2–1)	—	33,398	32–20	L2
53	June 2	Padres	5–4	**Strzelecki** (1–0)	Rogers (0–3)	—	21,451	33–20	W1
54	June 3	Padres	0–7	Musgrove (6–0)	**Burnes** (3–3)	—	30,019	33–21	L1
55	June 4	Padres	0–4	Gore (4–1)	**Ashby** (1–4)	—	37,376	33–22	L2
56	June 5	Padres	4–6 (10)	Hill (1–0)	**Gott** (1–1)	Rogers (18)	32,285	33–23	L3
57	June 7	Phillies	2–3	Brogdon (1–0)	**Hader** (0–1)	Knebel (10)	27,109	33–24	L4
58	June 8	Phillies	0–10	Nola (4–4)	**Houser** (3–6)	—	29,353	33–25	L5
59	June 9	Phillies	3–8	Domínguez (3–1)	**Burnes** (3–4)	—	27,306	33–26	L6
60	June 10	@ Nationals	5–11	Fedde (4–4)	**Ashby** (1–5)	—	26,111	33–27	L7
61	June 11	@ Nationals	6–8	Corbin (3–8)	**Lauer** (5–2)	—	25,265	33–28	L8
62	June 12	@ Nationals	4–1	**Milner** (3–1)	Espino (0–1)	**Hader** (19)	22,549	34–28	W1
63	June 14	@ Mets	0–4	Bassitt (5–4)	**Houser** (3–7)	—	28,495	34–29	L1
64	June 15	@ Mets	10–2	**Burnes** (4–4)	Peterson (3–1)	—	25,422	35–29	W1
65	June 16	@ Mets	4–5	Smith (1–1)	**Suter** (1–1)	Díaz (13)	25,002	35–30	L1
66	June 17	@ Reds	5–4	**Lauer** (6–2)	Detwiler (0–1)	**Boxberger** (1)	21,147	36–30	W1
67	June 18	@ Reds	7–3	**Alexander** (1–0)	Ashcraft (3–1)	—	25,071	37–30	W2
68	June 19	@ Reds	6–3	**Houser** (4–7)	Minor (1–3)	**Williams** (5)	25,001	38–30	W3
69	June 20	Cardinals	2–0	**Burnes** (5–4)	Nikolas (5–5)	**Hader** (20)	28,100	39–30	W4
70	June 21	Cardinals	2–6	Thompson (1–0)	**Gonzalez** (0–1)	—	30,208	39–31	L1
71	June 22	Cardinals	4–5	Oviedo (1–1)	**Lauer** (6–3)	Cabrera (1)	27,986	39–32	L2
72	June 23	Cardinals	6–4	**Alexander** (2–0)	Hudson (5–4)	**Hader** (21)	32,550	40–32	W1
73	June 24	Blue Jays	4–9	Manoah (9–2)	**Houser** (4–8)	—	32,166	40–33	L1
74	June 25	Blue Jays	5–4	**Burnes** (6–4)	Kikuchi (2–4)	**Hader** (22)	34,768	41–33	W1
75	June 26	Blue Jays	10–3	**Gustave** (1–0)	Berríos (5–4)	—	35,503	42–33	W2
76	June 28	@ Rays	5–3	**Woodruff** (6–3)	Wisler (2–2)	**Hader** (23)	13,742	43–33	W3
77	June 29	@ Rays	5–3	**Boxberger** (2–1)	Faucher (1–2)	**Hader** (24)	15,481	44–33	W4
78	June 30	@ Pirates	7–8	Brubaker (2–7)	**Suter** (1–2)	De Los Santos (2)	14,134	44–34	L1

July: 13–11 (Home: 7–5; Away: 6–6)

#	Date	Opponent	Score	Win	Loss	Save	Attendance	Record	Box/ Streak
79	July 1	@ Pirates	19–2	**Burnes** (7–4)	Contreras (2–2)	—	20,409	45–34	W1
80	July 2	@ Pirates	4–7	Wilson (1–4)	**Ashby** (1–6)	Bednar (12)	26,505	45–35	L1
81	July 3	@ Pirates	2–0	**Woodruff** (7–3)	Thompson (3–6)	**Hader** (25)	17,578	46–35	W1
82	July 4	Cubs	5–2 (10)	**Boxberger** (3–1)	Effross (1–4)	—	41,981	47–35	W2
83	July 5	Cubs	3–8	Swarmer (2–3)	**Alexander** (2–1)	—	30,561	47–36	L1
84	July 6	Cubs	1–2	Givens (5–0)	**Hader** (0–2)	Robertson (12)	32,696	47–37	L2
85	July 8	Pirates	4–3	**Ashby** (2–6)	Brubaker (2–8)	**Hader** (26)	29,471	48–37	W1
86	July 9	Pirates	3–4	De Jong (4–0)	**Boxberger** (3–2)	Bednar (15)	35,384	48–38	L1
87	July 10	Pirates	6–8	Stratton (5–4)	**Gott** (1–2)	—	32,967	48–39	L2
88	July 12	@ Twins	6–3	**Gustave** (2–0)	Winder (4–3)	**Hader** (27)	37,183	49–39	W1
89	July 13	@ Twins	1–4	Durán (1–3)	**Hader** (0–3)	—	38,802	49–40	L1
90	July 14	@ Giants	3–2 (10)	**Gott** (2–2)	Doval (3–5)	**Williams** (6)	26,994	50–40	W1
91	July 15	@ Giants	5–8	Long (1–2)	**Hader** (0–4)	—	28,244	50–41	L1
92	July 16	@ Giants	1–2	Brebbia (5–1)	**Suter** (1–3)	Leone (2)	41,279	50–42	L2
93	July 17	@ Giants	5–9	Webb (9–3)	**Ashby** (2–7)	—	30,584	50–43	L3
ASG	July 19	AL @ NL	3–2	Valdez (1–0)	Gonsolin (0–1)	Clase (1)	52,518	N/A	N/A
94	July 22	Rockies	6–5 (13)	**Suter** (2–3)	Bird (1–2)	—	33,357	51–43	W1
95	July 23	Rockies	9–4	**Woodruff** (8–3)	Ureña (1–2)	—	31,694	52–43	W2
96	July 24	Rockies	10–9	**Suter** (3–3)	Colomé (2–3)	**Hader** (28)	36,465	53–43	W3
97	July 25	Rockies	0–2	Freeland (5–7)	**Ashby** (2–8)	Bard (21)	25,194	53–44	L1
98	July 26	Twins	7–6	**Hader** (1–4)	Duffey (2–4)	—	28,596	54–44	W1
99	July 27	Twins	10–4	**Burnes** (8–4)	Archer (2–5)	—	35,914	55–44	W2
100	July 29	@ Red Sox	4–1	**Woodruff** (9–3)	Bello (0–3)	**Hader** (29)	34,193	56–44	W3
101	July 30	@ Red Sox	9–4	**Lauer** (7–3)	Pivetta (8–8)	—	35,867	57–44	W4
102	July 31	@ Red Sox	2–7	Winckowski (4–5)	**Ashby** (2–9)	—	35,231	57–45	L1

August: 12–15 (Home: 9–6; Away: 3–9)

#	Date	Opponent	Score	Win	Loss	Save	Attendance	Record	Box/ Streak
103	August 2	@ Pirates	3–5	Holderman (5–0)	**Burnes** (8–5)	Crowe (3)	12,401	57–46	L2
104	August 3	@ Pirates	7–8	Crowe (4–6)	**Williams** (2–1)	—	13,084	57–47	L3
105	August 4	@ Pirates	4–5 (10)	Underwood Jr. (1–3)	**Bush** (2–2)	—	13,485	57–48	L4
106	August 5	Reds	5–1	**Lauer** (8–3)	Dugger (0–1)	**Williams** (7)	33,239	58–48	W1
107	August 6	Reds	5–7	Farmer (1–1)	**Ashby** (2–10)	—	35,784	59–48	L1
108	August 7	Reds	2–4 (10)	Strickland (3–3)	**Williams** (2–2)	Detwiler (1)	40,063	58–50	L2
109	August 9	Rays	5–3	**Peralta** (4–2)	Yarbrough (0–7)	**Bush** (2)	30,030	59–50	W1
110	August 10	Rays	4–3 (10)	**Williams** (3–2)	Thompson (3–3)	—	30,644	60–50	W2
111	August 12	@ Cardinals	1–3	Montgomery (5–3)	**Lauer** (8–4)	Helsley (12)	45,669	60–51	L1
112	August 13	@ Cardinals	3–2 (10)	**Williams** (4–2)	Gallegos (2–5)	**Bush** (3)	45,905	61–51	W1
113	August 14	@ Cardinals	3–6	Mikolas (9–9)	**Rogers** (1–6)	—	44,142	61–52	L1
114	August 15	Dodgers	0–4	Urías (13–6)	**Peralta** (4–3)	—	27,084	61–53	L2
115	August 16	Dodgers	5–4 (11)	**Suter** (4–3)	Kimbrel (3–5)	—	32,948	62–53	W1
116	August 17	Dodgers	1–2	Gonsolin (15–1)	**Lauer** (8–5)	Kimbrel (21)	30,259	62–54	L1
117	August 18	Dodgers	5–3	**Burnes** (9–5)	Heaney (1–1)	**Williams** (8)	27,403	63–54	W1
118	August 19	@ Cubs	7–8	Rucker (2–1)	**Milner** (3–2)	Hughes (2)	39,962	63–55	L1
119	August 20	@ Cubs	5–6 (11)	Uelmen (2–1)	**Strzelecki** (1–1)	—	35,994	63–56	L2
120	August 21	@ Cubs	5–2	**Suter** (5–3)	Wick (3–6)	**Rogers** (29)	34,525	64–56	W1
121	August 22	@ Dodgers	4–0	**Lauer** (9–5)	Urías (13–7)	—	37,091	65–56	W2
122	August 23	@ Dodgers	1–10	Gonsolin (16–1)	**Burnes** (9–6)	—	53,222	65–57	L1
123	August 24	@ Dodgers	6–12	Heaney (2–1)	**Houser** (4–9)	—	47,216	65–58	L2
124	August 26	Cubs	3–4 (10)	Newcomb (2–0)	**Williams** (4–3)	Rodríguez (1)	33,549	65–59	L3
125	August 27	Cubs	7–0	**Rogers** (2–6)	Wick (4–7)	—	40,901	66–59	W1
126	August 28	Cubs	9–7	**Lauer** (10–5)	Newcomb (2–1)	**Williams** (9)	39,035	67–59	W2
127	August 29	Pirates	7–5	**Williams** (5–3)	Crowe (5–8)	—	23,009	68–59	W3
128	August 30	Pirates	2–4	Bañuelos (1–1)	**Boxberger** (3–3)	De Jong (1)	24,764	68–60	L1
129	August 31	Pirates	6–1	**Rogers** (3–6)	Yajure (1–1)	—	25,240	69–60	W1

September: 15–13 (Home: 9–6; Away: 6–7)

#	Date	Opponent	Score	Win	Loss	Save	Attendance	Record	Box/ Streak
130	September 1	@ Diamondbacks	0–5	Kelly (12–5)	**Woodruff** (9–4)	—	10,495	69–61	L1
131	September 2	@ Diamondbacks	1–2	Nelson (2–0)	**Lauer** (10–6)	Kennedy (10)	13,488	69–62	L2
132	September 3	@ Diamondbacks	8–6 (10)	**Williams** (6–3)	Mantiply (2–5)	**Rogers** (30)	22,138	70–62	W1
133	September 4	@ Diamondbacks	1–5	Gallen (11–2)	**Alexander** (2–2)	—	20,274	70–63	L1
134	September 5	@ Rockies	6–4	**Houser** (5–9)	Feltner (2–7)	**Williams** (10)	32,627	71–63	W1
135	September 6	@ Rockies	7–10 (10)	Bard (4–4)	**Rogers** (3–7)	—	22,329	71–64	L1
136	September 7	@ Rockies	4–8	Freeland (8–9)	**Lauer** (10–7)	—	20,278	71–65	L2
137	September 8 (1)	Giants	2–1	**Burnes** (10–6)	Junis (4–5)	**Williams** (11)	see 2nd game	72–65	W1
138	September 8 (2)	Giants	4–2	**Strzelecki** (2–1)	Young (0–1)	**Rogers** (31)	23,019	73–65	W2
139	September 9	Reds	2–8	Lodolo (4–5)	**Alexander** (2–3)	—	33,660	73–66	L1
140	September 10	Reds	5–1	**Houser** (6–9)	Anderson (0–3)	—	34,615	74–66	W1
141	September 11	Reds	7–6	**Woodruff** (10–4)	Dunn (1–3)	**Williams** (12)	42,482	75–66	W2
142	September 13	@ Cardinals	8–4	**Perdomo** (2–0)	Montgomery (8–4)	—	42,047	76–66	W3
143	September 14	@ Cardinals	1–4	Wainwright (11–9)	**Burnes** (10–7)	Helsley (17)	46,459	76–67	L1
144	September 16	Yankees	7–6	**Rogers** (4–7)	Holmes (6–4)	—	36,011	77–67	W1
145	September 17	Yankees	4–1	**Woodruff** (11–4)	Taillon (13–5)	**Williams** (13)	41,210	78–67	W2
146	September 18	Yankees	8–12	Cole (12–7)	**Milner** (3–3)	—	35,964	78–68	L1
147	September 19	Mets	2–7	Scherzer (10–4)	**Burnes** (10–8)	—	25,671	78–69	L2
148	September 20	Mets	5–7	Rodríguez (2–4)	**Rogers** (4–8)	Díaz (31)	26,319	78–70	L3
149	September 21	Mets	6–0	**Gott** (3–2)	Walker (12–5)	—	25,204	79–70	W1
150	September 22	@ Reds	5–1	**Woodruff** (12–4)	Greene (4–13)	—	9,889	80–70	W2
151	September 23	@ Reds	5–3	**Perdomo** (3–0)	Cessa (4–4)	**Williams** (14)	16,658	81–70	W3
152	September 24	@ Reds	10–2	**Burnes** (11–8)	Ashcraft (5–4)	—	20,472	82–70	W4
153	September 25	@ Reds	1–2	Farmer (2–1)	**Bush** (2–3)	Díaz (9)	19,952	82–71	L1
154	September 27	Cardinals	2–6	Mikolas (12–13)	**Houser** (6–10)	—	29,341	82–72	L2
155	September 28	Cardinals	5–1	**Woodruff** (13–4)	Quintana (6–7)	—	28,835	83–72	W1
156	September 29	Marlins	2–4	Nance (1–3)	**Peralta** (4–4)	Floro (9)	23,122	83–73	L1
157	September 30	Marlins	1–0	**Burnes** (12–8)	Alcántara (14–9)	**Williams** (15)	31,945	84–73	W1

October: 2–3 (Home: 2–3; Away: 0–0)

#	Date	Opponent	Score	Win	Loss	Save	Attendance	Record	Box/ Streak
158	October 1	Marlins	3–4	Nance (2–3)	**Williams** (6–4)	Bleier (1)	30,686	84–74	L1
159	October 2	Marlins	3–4 (12)	Brazobán (1–1)	**Gott** (3–3)	Scott (20)	31,053	84–75	L2
160	October 3	Diamondbacks	6–5 (10)	**Boxberger** (4–3)	Moronta (2–2)	—	18,612	85–75	W1
161	October 4	Diamondbacks	3–0	**Lauer** (11–7)	Gallen (12–4)	**Strzelecki** (1)	19,611	86–75	W2
162	October 5	Diamondbacks	2–4	Poppen (2–2)	**Gott** (3–4)	Ginkel (1)	18,765	86–76	L1

Legend: = Win = Loss = Postponement
Bold = Brewers team member

== Statistics ==
=== Batting ===
(Final Stats)
Players in bold are on the active roster.
Note: G = Games played; AB = At bats; R = Runs; H = Hits; 2B = Doubles; 3B = Triples; HR = Home runs; RBI = Runs batted in; SB = Stolen bases; BB = Walks; K = Strikeouts; AVG = Batting average; OBP = On-base percentage; SLG = Slugging percentage; TB = Total bases

Player	G	AB	R	H	2B	3B	HR	RBI	SB	BB	K	AVG	OBP	SLG	TB
**Willy Adames**	139	563	83	134	31	0	31	98	8	49	166	.238	.298	.458	258
Mike Brosseau	69	141	15	36	5	0	6	23	2	14	48	.255	.344	.418	59
Lorenzo Cain	43	145	17	26	5	0	1	9	2	8	36	.179	.231	.234	34
Víctor Caratini	95	272	26	54	12	0	9	34	0	31	67	.199	.300	.342	93
Jonathan Davis	37	76	9	17	1	0	0	4	7	14	26	.224	.344	.237	18
Mario Feliciano	2	4	0	1	0	0	0	0	0	1	1	.250	.400	.250	1
Keston Hiura	80	234	34	53	8	1	14	32	5	23	111	.226	.316	.449	105
Alex Jackson	5	12	0	3	0	0	0	0	0	0	7	.250	.250	.250	3
Mark Mathias	6	16	2	2	0	0	1	4	1	0	4	.125	.118	.313	5
**Andrew McCutchen**	134	515	66	122	25	0	17	69	8	57	124	.237	.316	.384	198
**Garrett Mitchell**	28	61	9	19	3	0	2	9	8	6	28	.311	.373	.459	28
Omar Narváez	84	262	21	54	12	1	4	23	0	29	57	.206	.292	.305	80
Jace Peterson	112	288	44	68	14	2	8	34	12	33	85	.236	.316	.382	110
**Hunter Renfroe**	125	474	62	121	23	1	29	72	1	39	121	.255	.315	.492	233
Pablo Reyes	5	15	1	4	0	0	0	0	0	1	2	.267	.313	.267	4
Esteury Ruiz	3	8	2	0	0	0	0	0	0	1	2	.000	.111	.000	0
Pedro Severino	8	18	0	4	2	0	0	1	0	3	7	.222	.333	.333	6
Tyrone Taylor	120	373	49	87	21	3	17	51	3	22	102	.233	.286	.442	165
**Rowdy Tellez**	153	529	67	116	23	0	35	89	2	62	121	.219	.306	.461	244
Luis Urías	119	406	54	97	17	1	16	47	1	50	99	.239	.335	.404	164
Kolten Wong	134	430	65	108	24	4	15	47	17	46	88	.251	.339	.430	185
**Christian Yelich**	154	575	99	145	25	4	14	57	19	88	162	.252	.355	.383	220
**TEAM TOTALS**	162	5417	725	1271	251	17	219	703	96	577	1464	.235	.315	.409	2213

=== Pitching ===
(through October 5, 2022)
Players in bold are on the active roster.
Note: W = Wins; L = Losses; ERA = Earned run average; WHIP = Walks plus hits per inning pitched; G = Games pitched; GS = Games started; SV = Saves; IP = Innings pitched; H = Hits allowed; R = Runs allowed; ER = Earned runs allowed; BB = Walks allowed; K = Strikeouts

Player	W	L	ERA	WHIP	G	GS	SV	IP	H	R	ER	BB	K
**Jason Alexander**	2	3	5.40	1.62	18	11	0	71.2	88	47	43	28	46
**Aaron Ashby**	2	10	4.44	1.43	27	19	1	107.1	106	62	53	47	106
**Luke Barker**	0	0	11.25	1.75	3	0	0	4.0	7	5	5	0	3
**Brad Boxberger**	4	3	2.95	1.23	70	0	1	64.0	52	23	21	27	68
Mike Brosseau	0	0	0.00	1.00	3	0	0	3.0	2	0	0	1	0
**Corbin Burnes**	12	8	2.94	0.97	33	33	0	202.0	144	73	66	51	243
**Matt Bush**	0	2	4.30	1.04	25	1	2	23.0	16	15	11	8	29
**Victor Caratini**	0	0	27.00	3.00	1	0	0	1.0	2	3	3	1	0
Jake Cousins	2	1	2.70	1.35	12	0	0	13.1	10	4	4	8	21
Chi Chi Gonzalez	0	1	6.35	1.41	4	2	0	11.1	12	8	8	4	8
**Trevor Gott**	3	4	4.14	1.03	45	0	0	45.2	35	25	21	12	44
Jandel Gustave	2	0	3.86	1.29	27	0	0	28.0	25	13	12	11	27
**Josh Hader**	1	1	4.24	1.12	37	0	29	34.0	26	16	16	12	59
**Adrian Houser**	6	10	4.73	1.46	22	21	0	102.2	103	66	54	47	69
**Trevor Kelley**	1	0	6.08	1.44	18	0	0	23.2	25	17	16	9	23
**Eric Lauer**	11	7	3.69	1.22	29	29	0	158.2	135	71	65	59	157
Jake McGee	0	0	6.35	1.41	6	0	0	5.2	7	4	4	1	4
J. C. Mejía	0	0	23.14	4.29	2	0	0	2.1	5	6	6	5	1
**Hoby Milner**	3	3	3.76	1.18	67	0	0	64.2	61	29	27	15	64
Freddy Peralta	4	4	3.58	1.04	18	17	0	78.0	54	31	31	27	86
Luis Perdomo	3	0	3.80	1.14	14	0	0	23.2	24	10	10	3	12
Jace Peterson	0	0	0.00	0.00	1	0	0	1.0	0	0	0	0	0
Pablo Reyes	0	0	0.00	0.00	1	0	0	1.0	0	0	0	0	0
Taylor Rogers	3	3	5.48	1.30	24	0	3	23.0	20	16	14	10	36
Connor Sadzeck	0	0	9.00	1.67	2	0	0	3.0	4	3	3	1	2
**Miguel Sánchez**	1	1	4.05	1.50	12	0	0	13.1	12	7	6	8	9
Ethan Small	0	0	7.11	2.53	2	2	0	6.1	8	5	5	8	7
Peter Strzelecki	2	1	2.83	1.23	30	0	1	35.0	28	13	11	15	40
**Brent Suter**	5	3	3.78	1.20	54	0	0	66.2	58	32	28	22	53
Justin Topa	0	0	4.91	1.77	7	0	0	7.1	9	6	4	4	4
José Ureña	0	0	3.52	1.57	4	0	0	7.2	7	5	3	5	3
**Devin Williams**	6	4	1.93	1.01	65	0	15	60.2	31	17	13	30	96
Brandon Woodruff	13	4	3.05	1.07	27	27	0	153.1	122	56	52	42	190
**TEAM TOTALS**	86	76	3.83	1.22	162	162	52	1446.0	1238	688	615	521	1530

== Farm system ==
The Brewers' farm system consisted of eight minor league affiliates in 2022.

Level	Team	League	Manager
Triple-A	Nashville Sounds	International League	Rick Sweet
Double-A	Biloxi Shuckers	Southern League	Mike Guerrero
High-A	Wisconsin Timber Rattlers	Midwest League	Joe Ayrault
Single-A	Carolina Mudcats	Carolina League	Victor Estevez
Rookie	ACL Brewers Blue	Arizona Complex League	Rafael Neda
Rookie	ACL Brewers Gold	Arizona Complex League	David Tufo
Rookie	DSL Brewers 1	Dominican Summer League	Fidel Peña
Rookie	DSL Brewers 2	Dominican Summer League	Natanael Mejia
