= 2021 Milwaukee Brewers season =

2021 Milwaukee Brewers
- National League Central champions
- League: National League
- Division: Central
- Ballpark: American Family Field
- City: Milwaukee, Wisconsin
- Record: 95–67 (.586)
- Divisional place: 1st
- Owners: Mark Attanasio
- General managers: Matt Arnold
- Managers: Craig Counsell
- Television: Bally Sports Wisconsin (Brian Anderson, Bill Schroeder, Matt Lepay, Chris Singleton) Telemundo Wisconsin (Spanish-language coverage, Sunday home games; Jaime Cano, Kevin Holden)
- Radio: 620 WTMJ; Milwaukee Brewers Radio Network (Bob Uecker, Jeff Levering, Lane Grindle)
- Stats: ESPN.com; Baseball Reference

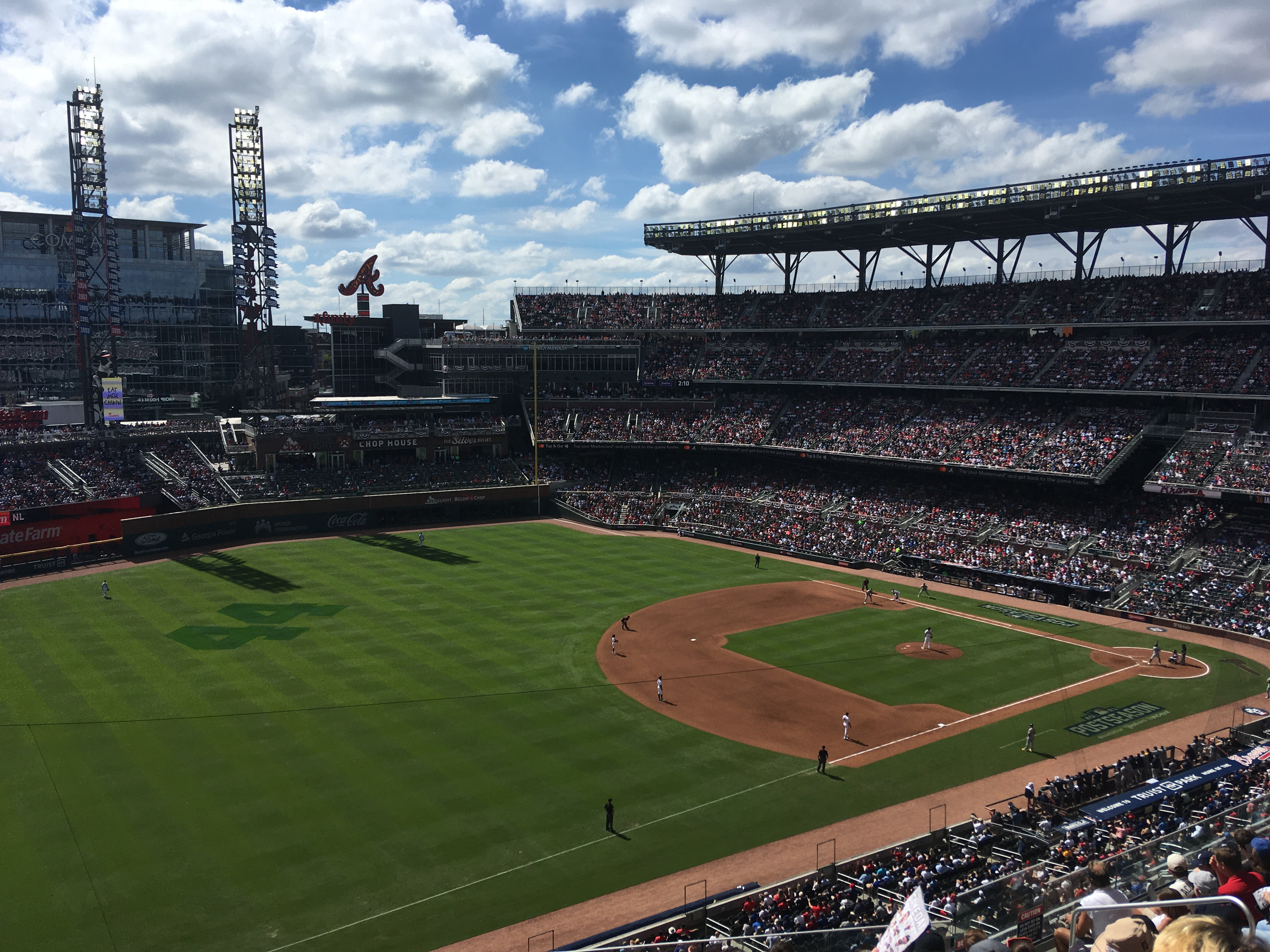
2021 NLDS Game 3 - Milwaukee Brewers at Atlanta Braves

The 2021 Milwaukee Brewers season was the 52nd season for the Brewers in Milwaukee, the 24th in the National League, and 53rd overall.

On July 9, 2020, MLB announced the 2021 season schedule. On July 24, they beat the Chicago White Sox 6–1 to win their 4,000th game in franchise history, doing so in their 8,289th game played.

On September 18, the Brewers clinched a playoff berth, extending their consecutive postseason streak to four years, a franchise record.

On September 26, the Brewers clinched the National League Central for the first time since the 2018 season. They lost to the eventual World Series champion Atlanta Braves in the NLDS.

== Spring training ==
The Brewers finished spring training with a record of 15–11 (3 ties).

== Opening Day Starters ==
Opening Day starting lineup
No.	Player	Pos.	Times
Batters
1	Kolten Wong	2B	2
2	Keston Hiura	1B	2
3	Christian Yelich	LF	5
4	Avisaíl García	RF	2
5	Travis Shaw	3B	4
6	Lorenzo Cain	CF	5
7	Omar Narvaez	C	2
8	Luis Urías	SS	1
9	Brandon Woodruff	P	2

== Season standings ==
=== National League Central ===
NL Central
Team	W	L	Pct.	GB	Home	Road
Milwaukee Brewers	95	67	.586	—	45‍–‍36	50‍–‍31
St. Louis Cardinals	90	72	.556	5	45‍–‍36	45‍–‍36
Cincinnati Reds	83	79	.512	12	44‍–‍37	39‍–‍42
Chicago Cubs	71	91	.438	24	39‍–‍42	32‍–‍49
Pittsburgh Pirates	61	101	.377	34	37‍–‍44	24‍–‍57

=== National League Wild Card ===
Division leaders
Team	W	L	Pct.
San Francisco Giants	107	55	.660
Milwaukee Brewers	95	67	.586
Atlanta Braves	88	73	.547

Wild Card teams (Top 2 teams qualify for postseason)
Team	W	L	Pct.	GB
Los Angeles Dodgers	106	56	.654	+16
St. Louis Cardinals	90	72	.556	—
Cincinnati Reds	83	79	.512	7
Philadelphia Phillies	82	80	.506	8
San Diego Padres	79	83	.488	11
New York Mets	77	85	.475	13
Colorado Rockies	74	87	.460	15½
Chicago Cubs	71	91	.438	19
Miami Marlins	67	95	.414	23
Washington Nationals	65	97	.401	25
Pittsburgh Pirates	61	101	.377	29
Arizona Diamondbacks	52	110	.321	38

=== Record vs. opponents ===
2021 National League record Source: MLB Standings Grid – 2021
Team	AZ	ATL	CHC	CIN	COL	LAD	MIA	MIL	NYM	PHI	PIT	SD	SF	STL	WSH	AL
Arizona	—	3–4	2–4	5–1	9–10	3–16	2–5	1–6	1–5	4–3	4–2	8–11	2–17	1–6	3–4	4–16
Atlanta	4–3	—	5–2	4–3	2–4	2–4	11–8	3–3	10–9	10–9	4–3	4–2	3–3	6–1	14–5	6–14
Chicago	4–2	2–5	—	8–11	3–3	4–3	1–5	4–15	4–3	2–5	14–5	5–1	1–6	9–10	4–3	6–14
Cincinnati	1–5	3–4	11–8	—	5–2	3–3	5–2	9–10	3–3	4–2	13–6	1–6	1–6	10–9	5–2	9–11
Colorado	10–9	4–2	3–3	2–5	—	6–13	4–2	2–5	2–5	5–2	4–2	11–8	4–15	3–4	4–2	10–10
Los Angeles	16–3	4–2	3–4	3–3	13–6	—	3–4	4–3	6–1	4–2	6–0	12–7	9–10	4–3	7–0	12–8
Miami	5–2	8–11	5–1	2–5	2–4	4–3	—	3–3	9–10	10–9	2–5	3–4	3–4	0–6	8–11	3–17
Milwaukee	6–1	3–3	15–4	10–9	5–2	3–4	3–3	—	4–2	2–5	14–5	5–2	4–3	8–11	5–1	8–12
New York	5–1	9–10	3–4	3–3	5–2	1–6	10–9	2–4	—	9–10	3–4	4–3	1–5	2–5	11–8	9–11
Philadelphia	3–4	9–10	5–2	2–4	2–5	2–4	9–10	5–2	10–9	—	4–3	4–2	2–4	4–3	13–6	8–12
Pittsburgh	2–4	3–4	5–14	6–13	2–4	0–6	5–2	5–14	4–3	3–4	—	3–4	4–3	7–12	2–4	10–10
San Diego	11–8	2–4	1–5	6–1	8–11	7–12	4–3	2–5	3–4	2–4	4–3	—	8–11	3–3	4–3	14–6
San Francisco	17–2	3–3	6–1	6–1	15–4	10–9	4–3	3–4	5–1	4–2	3–4	11–8	—	2–4	5–2	13–7
St. Louis	6–1	1–6	10–9	9–10	4–3	3–4	6–0	11–8	5–2	3–4	12–7	3–3	4–2	—	2–4	11–9
Washington	4–3	5–14	3–4	2–5	2–4	0–7	11–8	1–5	8–11	6–13	4–2	3–4	2–5	4–2	—	10–10

== Roster ==
2021 Milwaukee Brewers
Roster
Pitchers: 25 Brett Anderson; 26 Aaron Ashby; 59 John Axford; 50 Alec Bettinger; 32 Phil Bickford; 45 Brad Boxberger; 39 Corbin Burnes; 54 Jake Cousins; 46 John Curtiss; 54 J. P. Feyereisen; 46 Zack Godley; 31 Jandel Gustave; 71 Josh Hader; 36 Blaine Hardy; 37 Adrian Houser; 52 Eric Lauer; 29 Josh Lindblom; 55 Hoby Milner; 32 Daniel Norris; 51 Freddy Peralta; 47 Ángel Perdomo; 43 Drew Rasmussen; 48 Colin Rea; 32 Trevor Richards; 48 Sal Romano; 58 Miguel Sánchez; 43 Hunter Strickland; 35 Brent Suter; 56 Justin Topa; 46 Ryan Weber; 36 Patrick Weigel; 38 Devin Williams; 53 Brandon Woodruff; 57 Eric Yardley; 27 Jordan Zimmermann	Catchers: 0 Mario Feliciano; 12 Luke Maile; 10 Omar Narváez; 26 Jacob Nottingham; 9 Manny Piña; Infielders: 27 Willy Adames; 3 Orlando Arcia; 5 Eduardo Escobar; 18 Keston Hiura; 5,7 Tim Lopes; 14 Jace Peterson; 33 Pablo Reyes; 28 Daniel Robertson; 21 Travis Shaw; 11 Rowdy Tellez; 2 Luis Urías; 20 Daniel Vogelbach; 16 Kolten Wong	Outfielders: 41 Jackie Bradley Jr.; 6 Lorenzo Cain; 7 Derek Fisher; 24 Avisaíl García; 11 Billy McKinney; 3 Corey Ray; 15 Tyrone Taylor; 22 Christian Yelich	Manager: 30 Craig Counsell; Coaches: 23 Quintin Berry (first base coach); 65 Néstor Corredor (bullpen catcher); 63 Jacob Cruz (assistant hitting); 49 Andy Haines (hitting); 84 Chris Hook (pitching); 99 Steve Karsay (bullpen); 40 Jason Lane (third base coach); 60 Walker McKinven (associate pitching, catching, strategy); 00 Pat Murphy (bench); 62 Adam Weisenburger (bullpen catcher)

== Game log ==
=== Regular season ===
2021 regular season game log: 95–67 (Home: 45–36; Away: 50–31)
April: 16–10 (Home: 7–7; Away: 9–3)

#	Date	Opponent	Score	Win	Loss	Save	Attendance	Record	Box/ Streak
1	April 1	Twins	6–5 (10)	**Hader** (1–0)	Dobnak (0–1)	—	11,740	1–0	W1
2	April 3	Twins	0–2	Berríos (1–0)	**Burnes** (0–1)	Colomé (1)	11,383	1–1	L1
3	April 4	Twins	2–8	Pineda (1–0)	**Houser** (0–1)	—	10,666	1–2	L2
4	April 5	@ Cubs	3–5	Williams (1–0)	**Anderson** (0–1)	Mills (1)	10,343	1–3	L3
5	April 6	@ Cubs	4–0	**Peralta** (1–0)	Alzolay (0–1)		10,343	2–3	W1
6	April 7	@ Cubs	4–2 (10)	**Hader** (2–0)	Workman (0–1)	**Boxberger** (1)	10,343	3–3	W2
7	April 8	@ Cardinals	1–3	Gallegos (2–0)	**Rasmussen** (0–1)	Reyes (3)	13,328	3–4	L1
8	April 10	@ Cardinals	9–5	**Houser** (1–1)	Martínez (0–2)	—	13,304	4–4	W1
9	April 11	@ Cardinals	9–3	**Anderson** (1–1)	Ponce de Leon (1–1)	—	13,176	5–4	W2
10	April 12	Cubs	6–3	**Peralta** (2–0)	Alzolay (0–2)	**Hader** (1)	11,209	6–4	W3
11	April 13	Cubs	2–3	Strop (1–0)	**Suter** (0–1)	Kimbrel (3)	11,025	6–5	L1
12	April 14	Cubs	7–0	**Burnes** (1–1)	Arrieta (2–1)	—	10,598	7–5	W1
13	April 16	Pirates	1–6	Brubaker (2–0)	**Houser** (1–2)	—	11,967	7–6	L1
14	April 17	Pirates	7–1	**Anderson** (2–1)	Cahill (0–2)	—	12,038	8–6	W1
15	April 18	Pirates	5–6 (10)	Rodríguez (1–0)	**Feyereisen** (0–1)	—	11,772	8–7	L1
16	April 19	@ Padres	3–1	**Woodruff** (1–0)	Musgrove (2–2)	**Hader** (2)	15,250	9–7	W1
17	April 20	@ Padres	6–0	**Burnes** (2–1)	Paddack (1–2)	—	15,250	10–7	W2
18	April 21	@ Padres	4–2	**Suter** (1–1)	Kela (2–1)	**Hader** (3)	15,250	11–7	W3
19	April 23	@ Cubs	2–15	Hendricks (1–2)	**Anderson** (2–2)	—	10,343	11–8	L1
20	April 24	@ Cubs	4–3	**Suter** (2–1)	Chafin (0–1)	**Hader** (4)	10,343	12–8	W1
21	April 25	@ Cubs	6–0	**Woodruff** (2–0)	Arrieta (3–2)	—	10,343	13–8	W2
22	April 26	Marlins	0–8	Rogers (3–1)	**Burnes** (2–2)	—	10,749	13–9	L1
23	April 27	Marlins	5–4	**Houser** (2–2)	Curtiss (2–1)	**Hader** (5)	10,620	14–9	W1
24	April 28	Marlins	2–6	Alcántara (1–2)	**Godley** (0–1)	—	11,564	14–10	L1
25	April 29	Dodgers	2–1	**Lauer** (1–0)	Bauer (3–1)	**Hader** (6)	10,621	15–10	W1
26	April 30	Dodgers	3–1	**Peralta** (3–0)	Uceta (0–1)	**Hader** (7)	12,044	16–10	W2

May: 13–15 (Home: 6–7; Away: 7–8)

#	Date	Opponent	Score	Win	Loss	Save	Attendance	Record	Box/ Streak
27	May 1	Dodgers	6–5 (11)	**Perdomo** (1–0)	Vesia (0–1)	—	12,139	17–10	W3
28	May 2	Dodgers	4–16	Urías (4–0)	**Bettinger** (0–1)	—	12,130	17–11	L1
29	May 3	@ Phillies	3–4	Velasquez (1–0)	**Houser** (2–3)	Neris (6)	10,651	17–12	L2
30	May 4	@ Phillies	5–6	Nola (3–1)	**Lauer** (1–1)	Coonrod (2)	10,388	17–13	L3
31	May 5	@ Phillies	4–5	Kintzler (2–1)	**Peralta** (3–1)	Alvarado (2)	10,110	17–14	L4
32	May 6	@ Phillies	0–2	Wheeler (3–2)	**Woodruff** (2–1)	—	10,768	17–15	L5
33	May 7	@ Marlins	1–6	Rogers (4–2)	**Suter** (2–2)	—	5,507	17–16	L6
34	May 8	@ Marlins	6–2	**Houser** (3–3)	Castano (0–2)	—	5,764	18–16	W1
35	May 9	@ Marlins	2–1 (10)	**Hader** (3–0)	Bass (1–3)	**Rasmussen** (1)	5,105	19–16	W2
36	May 11	Cardinals	1–6 (11)	Reyes (2–0)	**Boxberger** (0–1)	—	10,595	19–17	L1
37	May 12	Cardinals	4–1	**Williams** (1–0)	Helsley (3–1)	**Hader** (8)	10,226	20–17	W1
38	May 13	Cardinals	0–2	Flaherty (7–0)	**Burnes** (2–3)	Reyes (11)	10,554	20–18	L1
39	May 14	Braves	3–6	Smyly (2–2)	**Houser** (3–4)	—	12,130	20–19	L2
40	May 15	Braves	1–5	Anderson (3–1)	**Anderson** (2–3)	—	16,344	20–20	L3
41	May 16	Braves	10–9	**Peralta** (4–1)	Ynoa (4–2)	**Hader** (9)	16,044	21–20	W1
42	May 18	@ Royals	0–2	Brentz (1–0)	**Woodruff** (2–2)	Staumont (4)	9,298	21–21	L1
43	May 19	@ Royals	4–6	Barlow (2–1)	**Feyereisen** (0–2)	Staumont (5)	8,950	21–22	L2
44	May 21	@ Reds	4–9	Hoffman (3–3)	**Houser** (3–5)	—	17,234	21–23	L3
45	May 22	@ Reds	4–3	**Suter** (3–2)	Hembree (0–1)	**Hader** (10)	17,611	22–23	W1
46	May 23	@ Reds	9–4	**Boxberger** (1–1)	Castillo (1–7)	—	16,171	23–23	W2
47	May 24	Padres	5–3	**Woodruff** (3–2)	Snell (1–1)	**Hader** (11)	14,524	24–23	W3
48	May 25	Padres	1–7	Hill (3–2)	**Burnes** (2–4)	—	13,566	24–24	L1
49	May 26	Padres	1–2 (10)	Adams (1–0)	**Suter** (3–3)	Melancon (17)	13,478	24–25	L2
50	May 27	Padres	6–5 (10)	**Suter** (4–3)	Díaz (2–1)	—	13,572	25–25	W1
—	May 28	@ Nationals	Postponed (rain; makeup May 29)						
51	May 29 (1)	@ Nationals	4–1 (7)	**Peralta** (5–1)	Corbin (3–4)	—	9,910	26–25	W2
52	May 29 (2)	@ Nationals	6–2 (7)	**Suter** (5–3)	Hudson (3–1)	—	12,529	27–25	W3
53	May 30	@ Nationals	3–0	**Woodruff** (4–2)	Scherzer (4–4)	**Hader** (12)	15,326	28–25	W4
54	May 31	Tigers	3–2 (10)	**Boxberger** (2–1)	Cisnero (0–2)	—	23,917	29–25	W5

June: 19–8 (Home: 13–4; Away: 6–4)

#	Date	Opponent	Score	Win	Loss	Save	Attendance	Record	Box/ Streak
55	June 1	Tigers	7–10	Holland (1–1)	**Lauer** (1–2)	—	12,058	29–26	L1
56	June 3	Diamondbacks	7–4	**Suter** (6–3)	Duplantier (0–1)	**Hader** (13)	12,392	30–26	W1
57	June 4	Diamondbacks	5–1	**Peralta** (6–1)	Peacock (2–2)	—	15,261	31–26	W2
58	June 5	Diamondbacks	7–5	**Williams** (2–0)	Soria (0–2)	**Hader** (14)	20,073	32–26	W3
59	June 6	Diamondbacks	2–0	**Burnes** (3–4)	Smith (2–2)	**Boxberger** (2)	20,117	33–26	W4
60	June 8	@ Reds	5–1	**Houser** (4–5)	Hendrix (2–1)	—	11,897	34–26	W5
61	June 9	@ Reds	3–7	Gutiérrez (2–1)	**Anderson** (2–4)	—	11,862	34–27	L1
62	June 10	@ Reds	7–2	**Suter** (7–3)	Castillo (2–9)	—	12,423	35–27	W1
63	June 11	Pirates	7–4	**Woodruff** (5–2)	Holmes (2–1)	**Hader** (15)	17,678	36–27	W2
64	June 12	Pirates	7–4	**Richards** (1–0)	Kuhl (0–4)	**Hader** (16)	20,126	37–27	W3
65	June 13	Pirates	5–2	**Suter** (8–3)	Bednar (0–1)	**Hader** (17)	20,545	38–27	W4
66	June 14	Reds	2–10	Gutiérrez (3–1)	**Lauer** (1–3)	—	17,127	38–28	L1
67	June 15	Reds	1–2 (10)	Sims (4–1)	**Boxberger** (2–2)	Garrett (3)	16,584	38–29	L2
68	June 16	Reds	1–2	Mahle (7–2)	**Peralta** (6–2)	Sims (7)	20,088	38–30	L3
69	June 17	@ Rockies	3–7	Márquez (5–6)	**Woodruff** (5–3)	—	22,756	38–31	L4
70	June 18	@ Rockies	5–6 (10)	Chacín (1–1)	**Williams** (2–1)	—	27,117	38–32	L5
71	June 19	@ Rockies	6–5	**Richards** (2–0)	Kinley (1–1)	**Hader** (18)	34,198	39–32	W1
72	June 20	@ Rockies	7–6	**Williams** (3–1)	Bard (3–4)	**Boxberger** (3)	34,224	40–32	W2
73	June 21	@ Diamondbacks	1–5	Kelly (3–7)	**Anderson** (2–5)	—	9,804	40–33	L1
74	June 22	@ Diamondbacks	5–0	**Peralta** (7–2)	Gallen (1–3)	—	9,358	41–33	W1
75	June 23	@ Diamondbacks	3–2	**Woodruff** (6–3)	Smith (2–3)	**Hader** (19)	8,676	42–33	W2
76	June 25	Rockies	5–4 (11)	**Williams** (4–1)	Gilbreath (0–1)	—	31,140	43–33	W3
77	June 26	Rockies	10–4	**Boxberger** (3–2)	Estévez (2–1)	—	32,573	44–33	W4
78	June 27	Rockies	5–0	**Lauer** (2–3)	Gonzalez (2–5)	—	25,016	45–33	W5
79	June 28	Cubs	14–4	**Williams** (5–1)	Tepera (0–2)	—	30,251	46–33	W6
80	June 29	Cubs	2–1	**Woodruff** (7–3)	Davies (5–5)	**Hader** (20)	24,423	47–33	W7
81	June 30	Cubs	15–7	**Richards** (3–0)	Brothers (2–1)	—	32,193	48–33	W8

July: 14–10 (Home: 3–6; Away: 11–4)

#	Date	Opponent	Score	Win	Loss	Save	Attendance	Record	Box/ Streak
82	July 1	@ Pirates	7–2	**Burnes** (4–4)	Crowe (1–5)	—	11,074	49–33	W9
83	July 2	@ Pirates	7–2	**Houser** (5–5)	Brubaker (4–8)	—	15,421	50–33	W10
84	July 3	@ Pirates	11–2	**Lauer** (3–3)	Ponce (0–2)	—	17,451	51–33	W11
85	July 4	@ Pirates	0–2	Anderson (4–8)	**Peralta** (7–3)	Rodríguez (11)	12,527	51–34	L1
86	July 5	@ Mets	2–4	Lugo (2–1)	**Woodruff** (7–4)	Díaz (18)	15,145	51–35	L2
—	July 6	@ Mets	Postponed (Rain, Makeup: July 7)						
87	July 7 (1)	@ Mets	3–4 (8)	Díaz (3–2)	**Suter** (8–4)	—	20,953	51–36	L3
88	July 7 (2)	@ Mets	5–0 (7)	**Cousins** (1–0)	Stock (0–2)	—	13,218	52–36	W1
89	July 8	Reds	5–3	**Williams** (6–1)	Brach (0–1)	**Hader** (21)	22,948	53–36	W2
90	July 9	Reds	0–2	Miley (7–4)	**Lauer** (3–4)	Hembree (5)	24,844	53–37	L1
91	July 10	Reds	3–4	Osich (2–0)	**Hader** (3–1)	Hembree (6)	32,034	53–38	L2
92	July 11	Reds	1–3	Hendrix (5–1)	**Hader** (3–2)	Osich (1)	32,135	53–39	L3
ASG	July 13	AL @ NL	2–5	Ohtani (1–0)	Burnes (0–1)	Hendriks (1)	49,184	—	?
93	July 16	@ Reds	11–6	**Suter** (9–4)	Garrett (0–3)	—	34,844	54–39	W1
94	July 17	@ Reds	7–4 (11)	**Gustave** (1–0)	Doolittle (3–1)	—	37,204	55–39	W2
95	July 18	@ Reds	8–0	**Burnes** (5–4)	Gray (2–5)	—	29,001	56–39	W3
96	July 20	Royals	2–5	Minor (7–8)	**Strickland** (0–1)	Holland (6)	20,140	56–40	L1
97	July 21	Royals	3–6	Keller (7–9)	**Suter** (9–5)	Barlow (5)	30,063	56–41	L2
98	July 23	White Sox	7–1	**Houser** (6–5)	Giolito (8–7)	—	32,714	57–41	W1
99	July 24	White Sox	6–1	**Burnes** (6–4)	Rodón (8–4)	—	41,686	58–41	W2
100	July 25	White Sox	1–3	Lynn (10–3)	**Woodruff** (7–5)	Hendriks (24)	36,887	58–42	L1
101	July 27	@ Pirates	9–0	**Anderson** (3–5)	Oviedo (1–2)	—	10,618	59–42	W1
102	July 28	@ Pirates	7–3	**Houser** (7–5)	Kranick (1–2)	—	10,204	60–42	W2
103	July 29	@ Pirates	12–0	**Peralta** (8–3)	Kuhl (3–6)	—	10,503	61–42	W3
104	July 30	@ Braves	9–5	**Boxberger** (4–2)	Toussaint (1–2)	—	38,680	62–42	W4
105	July 31	@ Braves	1–8	Chavez (2–2)	**Woodruff** (7–6)	—	39,088	62–43	L1

August: 19–9 (Home: 7–5; Away: 12–4)

#	Date	Opponent	Score	Win	Loss	Save	Attendance	Record	Box/ Streak
106	August 1	@ Braves	2–1	**Anderson** (4–5)	Morton (10–4)	**Hader** (22)	33,469	63–43	W1
107	August 2	Pirates	6–2	**Lauer** (4–4)	Wilson (2–4)	**Boxberger** (4)	23,563	64–43	W2
108	August 3	Pirates	5–8 (10)	Bednar (3–1)	**Hardy** (0–1)	—	24,902	64–44	L1
109	August 4	Pirates	4–2	**Suter** (10–5)	Keller (0–1)	**Williams** (1)	28,003	65–44	W1
110	August 6	Giants	2–1 (10)	**Suter** (11–5)	García (3–3)	—	33,250	66–44	W2
111	August 7	Giants	6–9 (11)	García (4–3)	**Romano** (0–1)	—	34,155	66–45	L1
112	August 8	Giants	4–5	Watson (4–3)	**Boxberger** (4–3)	Littell (1)	38,597	66–46	L2
—	August 9	@ Cubs	Postponed (rain; makeup August 10)						
113	August 10 (1)	@ Cubs	4–2 (7)	**Peralta** (9–3)	Steele (2–1)	**Williams** (2)	29,031	67–46	W1
114	August 10 (2)	@ Cubs	6–3 (7)	**Sánchez** (1–0)	Winkler (1–3)	—	28,674	68–46	W2
115	August 11	@ Cubs	10–0	**Burnes** (7–4)	Arrieta (5–11)	—	29,619	69–46	W3
116	August 12	@ Cubs	17–4	**Strickland** (1–1)	Hendricks (13–5)	—	32,502	70–46	W4
—	August 13	@ Pirates	Postponed (rain; makeup August 14)						
117	August 14 (1)	@ Pirates	4–14 (7)	Shreve (1–0)	**Anderson** (4–6)	—	16,991	70–47	L1
118	August 14 (2)	@ Pirates	6–0 (7)	**Boxberger** (5–3)	Keller (3–10)	—	24,081	71–47	W1
119	August 15	@ Pirates	2–1	**Suter** (12–5)	Peters (0–1)	**Hader** (23)	12,001	72–47	W2
120	August 17	@ Cardinals	2–0	**Burnes** (8–4)	Wainwright (11–7)	**Hader** (24)	28,058	73–47	W3
121	August 18	@ Cardinals	6–4 (10)	**Hader** (4–2)	Reyes (5–6)	**Williams** (3)	25,938	74–47	W4
122	August 19	@ Cardinals	4–8	Fernández (1–0)	**Woodruff** (7–7)	—	27,545	74–48	L1
123	August 20	Nationals	1–4	Corbin (7–12)	**Anderson** (4–7)	Finnegan (5)	27,998	74–49	L2
124	August 21	Nationals	9–6	**Williams** (7–1)	Guerra (0–1)	**Hader** (25)	36,938	75–49	W1
125	August 22	Nationals	7–3	**Strickland** (2–1)	Nolin (0–2)	**Hader** (26)	33,507	76–49	W2
126	August 24	Reds	7–4	**Strickland** (3–1)	Lorenzen (0–1)	**Hader** (27)	24,819	77–49	W3
127	August 25	Reds	4–1	**Woodruff** (8–7)	Castillo (7–13)	—	24,715	78–49	W4
128	August 26	Reds	1–5	Gray (6–6)	**Anderson** (4–8)	—	28,656	78–50	L1
129	August 27	@ Twins	0–2	Albers (1–0)	**Lauer** (4–5)	Colomé (8)	20,280	78–51	L2
130	August 28	@ Twins	4–6	Thielbar (6–0)	**Houser** (7–6)	Colomé (9)	29,342	78–52	L3
131	August 29	@ Twins	6–2	**Ashby** (1–0)	Jax (3–3)	—	26,186	79–52	W1
132	August 30	@ Giants	3–1	**Burnes** (9–4)	Álvarez (4–2)	**Hader** (28)	23,154	80–52	W2
133	August 31	@ Giants	6–2	**Woodruff** (9–7)	Cueto (7–7)	—	20,897	81–52	W3

September–October: 14–15 (Home: 9–7; Away: 5–8)

#	Date	Opponent	Score	Win	Loss	Save	Attendance	Record	Box/ Streak
134	September 1	@ Giants	5–2	**Norris** (2–3)	Leone (3–3)	**Hader** (29)	21,189	82–52	W4
135	September 2	@ Giants	1–5	Rogers (5–1)	**Williams** (7–2)	—	21,023	82–53	L1
136	September 3	Cardinals	4–15	Wainwright (14–7)	**Peralta** (9–4)	—	23,987	82–54	L2
137	September 4	Cardinals	4–0	**Houser** (8–6)	Kim (6–7)	—	33,439	83–54	W1
138	September 5	Cardinals	6–5	**Sánchez** (2–0)	Reyes (5–8)	—	33,845	84–54	W2
139	September 6	Phillies	0–12	Wheeler (12–9)	**Woodruff** (9–8)	—	30,192	84–55	L1
140	September 7	Phillies	10–0	**Lauer** (5–5)	Nola (7–8)	—	22,955	85–55	W1
141	September 8	Phillies	4–3	**Ashby** (2–0)	Brogdon (5–4)	**Hader** (30)	20,654	86–55	W2
142	September 10	@ Indians	10–3	**Houser** (9–6)	Morgan (2–7)	—	17,667	87–55	W3
143	September 11	@ Indians	3–0	**Burnes** (10–4)	Plesac (10–5)	**Hader** (31)	20,100	88–55	W4
144	September 12	@ Indians	11–1	**Lauer** (6–5)	Civale (10–4)	**Ashby** (1)	16,332	89–55	W5
145	September 14	@ Tigers	0–1 (11)	Garcia (2–1)	**Strickland** (3–2)	—	12,433	89–56	L1
146	September 15	@ Tigers	1–4	Manning (4–6)	**Woodruff** (9–9)	Fulmer (9)	11,321	89–57	L2
147	September 17	Cubs	8–5	**Ashby** (3–0)	Wick (0–1)	**Hader** (32)	28,483	90–57	W1
148	September 18	Cubs	6–4	**Williams** (8–2)	Effross (2–1)	**Hader** (33)	33,625	91–57	W2
149	September 19	Cubs	4–6	Morgan (1–0)	**Boxberger** (5–4)	Rucker (1)	34,213	91–58	L1
150	September 20	Cardinals	2–5	Lester (7–6)	**Peralta** (9–5)	García (1)	28,291	91–59	L2
151	September 21	Cardinals	1–2	Woodford (3–3)	**Woodruff** (9–10)	Gallegos (11)	30,475	91–60	L3
152	September 22	Cardinals	2–10	Mikolas (2–2)	**Anderson** (4–9)	—	29,635	91–61	L4
153	September 23	Cardinals	5–8	McFarland (4–1)	**Ashby** (3–1)	Gallegos (12)	30,804	91–62	L5
154	September 24	Mets	5–1	**Lauer** (7–5)	Megill (3–6)	—	27,452	92–62	W1
155	September 25	Mets	2–1	**Burnes** (11–4)	Hill (6–8)	**Hader** (34)	35,388	93–62	W2
156	September 26	Mets	8–4	**Peralta** (10–5)	Carrasco (1–4)	—	43,430	94–62	W3
157	September 28	@ Cardinals	2–6	Wainwright (17–7)	**Gustave** (1–1)	—	35,726	94–63	L1
158	September 29	@ Cardinals	4–0	**Houser** (10–6)	Mikolas (2–3)	—	35,283	95–63	W1
159	September 30	@ Cardinals	3–4	Happ (10–8)	**Sánchez** (2–1)	García (2)	29,161	95–64	L1
160	October 1	@ Dodgers	6–8	Treinen (6–5)	**Gustave** (1–2)	Jansen (38)	51,388	95–65	L2
161	October 2	@ Dodgers	3–8	Urías (20–3)	**Burnes** (11–5)	—	49,705	95–66	L3
162	October 3	@ Dodgers	3–10	Buehler (16–4)	**Ashby** (3–2)	Jackson (1)	43,170	95–67	L4

Legend: = Win = Loss = Postponement
Bold = Brewers team member

== Player stats ==
=== Batting ===
Note: G = Games played; AB = At bats; R = Runs; H = Hits; 2B = Doubles; 3B = Triples; HR = Home runs; RBI = Runs batted in; SB = Stolen bases; BB = Walks; AVG = Batting average; SLG = Slugging average

Player	G	AB	R	H	2B	3B	HR	RBI	SB	BB	AVG	SLG
Luis Urías	150	490	77	122	25	1	23	75	5	63	.249	.445
Avisaíl García	135	461	68	121	18	0	29	86	8	38	.262	.490
Kolten Wong	116	445	70	121	32	2	14	50	12	31	.272	.447
Christian Yelich	117	399	70	99	19	2	9	51	9	70	.248	.373
Omar Narváez	123	391	54	104	20	0	11	49	0	41	.266	.402
Jackie Bradley Jr.	134	387	39	63	14	3	6	29	7	28	.163	.261
Willy Adames	99	365	61	104	26	0	20	58	4	47	.285	.521
Jace Peterson	94	259	36	64	11	1	6	31	10	38	.247	.367
Lorenzo Cain	78	257	40	66	13	0	8	36	13	26	.257	.401
Tyrone Taylor	93	243	33	60	9	3	12	43	6	20	.247	.457
Daniel Vogelbach	93	215	30	47	8	0	9	24	0	43	.219	.381
Manny Piña	75	180	27	34	6	0	13	33	0	22	.189	.439
Eduardo Escobar	48	179	27	48	12	2	6	25	0	19	.268	.458
Travis Shaw	56	178	14	34	8	0	6	28	0	19	.191	.337
Keston Hiura	61	173	16	29	9	1	4	19	3	14	.168	.301
Rowdy Tellez	56	158	22	43	10	1	7	28	0	14	.272	.481
Billy McKinney	40	92	9	19	3	1	3	6	1	7	.207	.359
Pablo Reyes	53	78	12	20	5	0	1	3	4	9	.256	.359
Daniel Robertson	50	73	10	12	2	0	2	4	0	12	.164	.274
Luke Maile	15	30	6	9	4	0	0	3	0	3	.300	.433
Jacob Nottingham	5	14	2	3	1	0	2	4	0	0	.214	.714
Orlando Arcia	4	11	0	1	0	0	0	1	0	0	.091	.091
Tim Lopes	7	10	1	1	0	0	0	0	0	1	.100	.100
Derek Fisher	4	8	1	2	0	1	0	1	0	0	.250	.500
Corey Ray	1	2	1	0	0	0	0	0	0	1	.000	.000
Mario Feliciano	1	0	1	0	0	0	0	0	0	1	.---	.---
Pitcher totals	162	264	11	25	0	0	3	13	0	19	.095	.129
Team totals	162	5362	738	1251	255	18	194	700	82	586	.233	.396

Source:2021 Milwaukee Brewers Batting Statistics

=== Pitching ===
Note: W = Wins; L = Losses; ERA = Earned run average; G = Games pitched; GS = Games started; SV = Saves; IP = Innings pitched; H = Hits allowed; R = Runs allowed; ER = Earned runs allowed; BB = Walks allowed; SO = Strikeouts

Player	W	L	ERA	G	GS	SV	IP	H	R	ER	BB	SO
Brandon Woodruff	9	10	2.56	30	30	0	179.1	130	54	51	43	211
Corbin Burnes	11	5	2.43	28	28	0	167.0	123	47	45	34	234
Freddy Peralta	10	5	2.81	28	27	0	144.1	84	47	45	56	195
Adrian Houser	10	6	3.22	28	26	0	142.1	118	61	51	64	105
Eric Lauer	7	5	3.19	24	20	0	118.2	94	46	42	41	117
Brett Anderson	4	9	4.22	24	24	0	96.0	102	52	45	28	58
Brent Suter	12	5	3.07	61	1	1	73.1	72	34	25	24	69
Brad Boxberger	5	4	3.34	71	0	4	64.2	44	26	24	25	83
Josh Hader	4	2	1.23	60	0	34	58.2	25	8	8	24	102
Devin Williams	8	2	2.50	58	0	3	54.0	36	17	15	28	87
Hunter Strickland	3	2	1.73	35	0	0	36.1	21	8	7	12	38
Aaron Ashby	3	2	4.55	13	4	1	31.2	25	20	16	12	39
Jake Cousins	1	0	2.70	30	0	0	30.0	16	9	9	19	44
Miguel Sánchez	2	1	4.15	28	0	0	26.0	27	14	12	14	23
Hoby Milner	0	0	5.40	19	0	0	21.2	30	15	13	3	30
Daniel Norris	1	0	6.64	18	0	0	20.1	17	16	15	15	18
Trevor Richards	3	0	3.20	15	0	0	19.2	15	7	7	9	25
J. P. Feyereisen	0	2	3.26	21	0	0	19.1	10	9	7	11	20
Eric Yardley	0	0	6.75	17	0	0	18.2	24	15	14	10	5
Jandel Gustave	1	2	3.44	14	0	0	18.1	15	10	7	5	13
Drew Rasmussen	0	1	4.24	15	0	1	17.0	13	11	8	12	25
Ángel Perdomo	1	0	6.35	19	0	0	17.0	12	12	12	16	28
Josh Lindblom	0	0	9.72	8	0	0	16.2	23	18	18	10	17
Alec Bettinger	0	1	13.50	4	1	0	10.0	18	15	15	3	5
Colin Rea	0	0	7.50	1	0	0	6.0	7	5	5	0	5
Jordan Zimmermann	0	0	7.94	2	0	0	5.2	8	5	5	2	0
John Curtiss	0	0	12.46	6	0	0	4.1	8	8	6	3	4
Patrick Weigel	0	0	4.50	3	0	0	4.0	4	2	2	4	9
Justin Topa	0	0	29.70	4	0	0	3.1	12	11	11	1	1
Zack Godley	0	1	16.20	2	1	0	3.1	4	7	6	5	5
Jace Peterson	0	0	9.00	2	0	0	2.0	4	2	2	1	2
Daniel Robertson	0	0	0.00	1	0	0	1.0	1	0	0	0	0
Phil Bickford	0	0	18.00	1	0	0	1.0	2	2	2	1	0
Ryan Weber	0	0	0.00	1	0	0	1.0	1	0	0	0	0
Luke Maile	0	0	9.00	1	0	0	1.0	2	1	1	0	0
Blaine Hardy	0	1	18.00	1	0	0	1.0	3	3	2	1	1
Sal Romano	0	1	27.00	1	0	0	1.0	4	4	3	0	0
John Axford	0	0	54.00	1	0	0	0.1	2	2	2	1	0
Team totals	95	67	3.50	162	162	44	1436.0	1156	623	558	537	1618

Source:2021 Milwaukee Brewers Pitching Statistics

=== Postseason ===
2021 Postseason game log: 1–3 (Home: 1–1; Away: 0–2)
NL Division Series: 1–3 (Home: 1–1; Away: 0–2)

#	Date	Opponent	Score	Win	Loss	Save	Attendance	Record	Box/ Streak
1	October 8	Braves	2–1	Houser (1–0)	Morton (0–1)	Hader (1)	40,852	1–0	W1
2	October 9	Braves	0–3	Fried (1–0)	Woodruff (0–1)	Smith (1)	43,812	1–1	L1
3	October 11	@ Braves	0–3	Anderson (1–0)	Houser (1–1)	Smith (2)	41,479	1–2	L2
4	October 12	@ Braves	4–5	Matzek (1–0)	Hader (0–1)	Smith (3)	40,195	1–3	L3

== Postseason rosters ==
Playoff rosters
National League Division Series

- Pitchers: 26 Aaron Ashby 31 Jandel Gustave 37 Adrian Houser 39 Corbin Burnes 43 Hunter Strickland 45 Brad Boxberger 51 Freddy Peralta 52 Eric Lauer 53 Brandon Woodruff 54 Jake Cousins 71 Josh Hader
- Catchers: 9 Manny Piña 10 Omar Narváez 12 Luke Maile
- Infielders: 2 Luis Urías 5 Eduardo Escobar 11 Rowdy Tellez 14 Jace Peterson 16 Kolten Wong 20 Daniel Vogelbach 27 Willy Adames
- Outfielders: 6 Lorenzo Cain 15 Tyrone Taylor 22 Christian Yelich 24 Avisaíl García 41 Jackie Bradley Jr.

== Farm system ==
The Brewers' farm system consisted of eight minor league affiliates in 2021.

Level	Team	League	Manager
Triple-A	Nashville Sounds	Triple-A East	Rick Sweet
Double-A	Biloxi Shuckers	Double-A South	Mike Guerrero
High-A	Wisconsin Timber Rattlers	High-A Central	Matt Erickson
Low-A	Carolina Mudcats	Low-A East	Joe Ayrault
Rookie	ACL Brewers Blue	Arizona Complex League	Rafael Neda
Rookie	ACL Brewers Gold	Arizona Complex League	David Tufo
Rookie	DSL Brewers 1	Dominican Summer League	Victor Estevez
Rookie	DSL Brewers 2	Dominican Summer League	Fidel Peña
