= Chris Hook =

American baseball player & coach (born 1968)

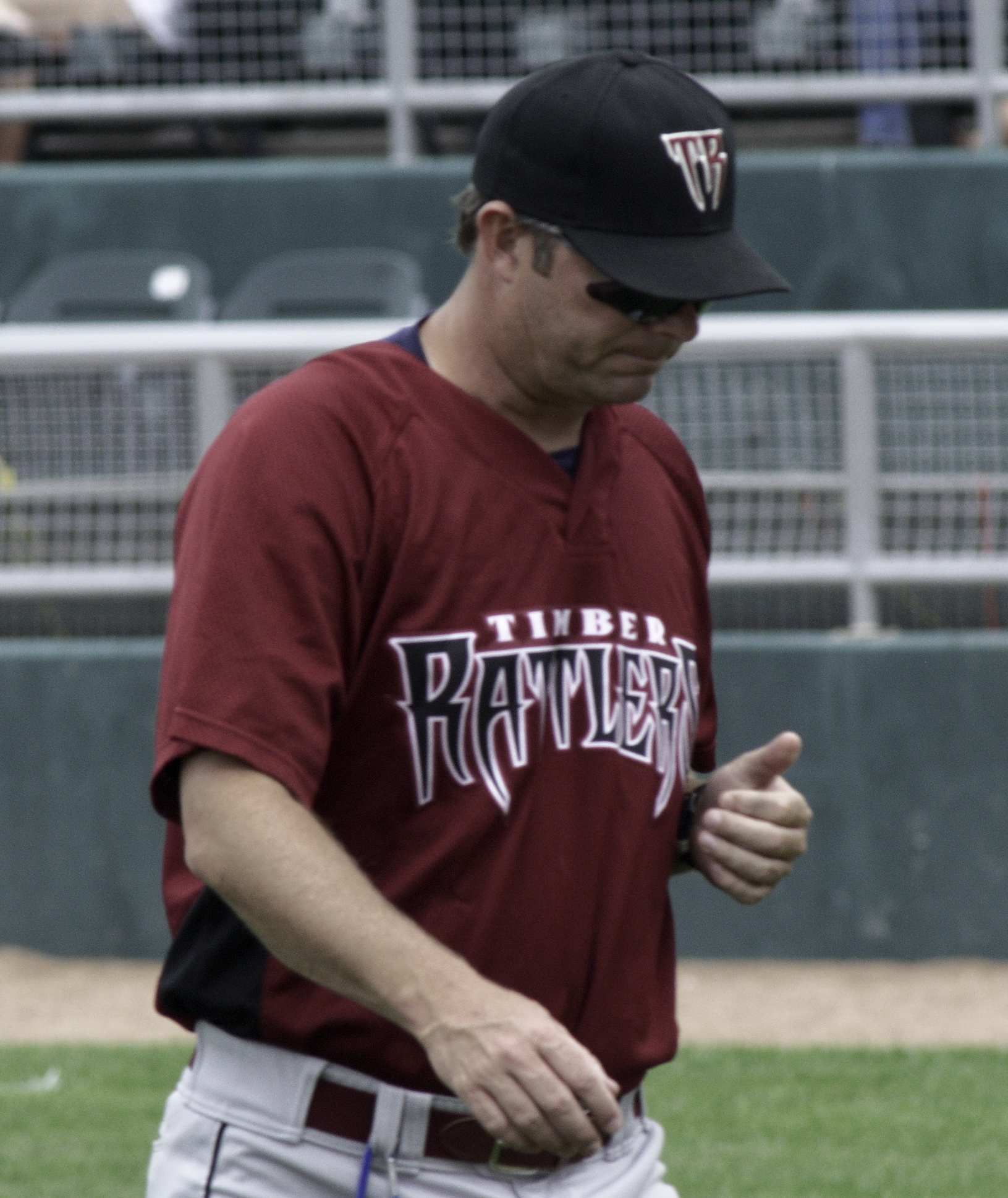
- Hook with the Wisconsin Timber Rattlers in 2011

Milwaukee Brewers – No. 84
- Relief pitcher / Pitching coach
- Born: August 4, 1968 (age 58); San Diego, California, U.S.
- Batted: Right Threw: Right

MLB debut
- April 30, 1995, for the San Francisco Giants

Last MLB appearance
- September 29, 1996, for the San Francisco Giants

MLB statistics
- Win–loss record: 5–2
- Earned run average: 5.89
- Strikeouts: 44
- Stats at Baseball Reference

Teams
- As player: San Francisco Giants (1995–1996); As coach: Milwaukee Brewers (2019–present)

Career highlights and awards
- World Series champion (2026)

Christopher Wayne Hook (born August 4, 1968) is an American former professional baseball relief pitcher who is the pitching coach for the Milwaukee Brewers of Major League Baseball (MLB). He played in MLB for the San Francisco Giants from 1995 to 1996. He played college baseball for the Northern Kentucky Norse.

== Major league career ==
Chris Hook made his major league debut on April 30, 1995, against the Florida Marlins. He pitched one and two thirds of an inning, giving up one hit and one run. Overall, for the 1995 season, he had a 5–1 record with a 5.50 earned run average (ERA). In 1996, he made 10 appearances, which resulted in one loss and a 7.43 ERA.

== Coaching career ==
From 2004 to 2007, he was the pitching coach, as well as manager of baseball operations for the Florence Freedom of the independent Frontier League. In February 2008, Hook announced he was leaving the Freedom to become pitching coach for the Double-A affiliate of the Milwaukee Brewers, the Huntsville Stars. Through the 2009 and 2011 seasons, Hook became the pitching coach for the Single-A affiliate of the Milwaukee Brewers, the Wisconsin Timber Rattlers. During the 2011-2012 offseason, it was announced Hook would return to Double-A Huntsville once more as pitching coach. He served as the Brewers' Double-A pitching coach through 2017, then as the Brewers' roving minor league pitching coordinator in 2018.

Hook was hired as the Milwaukee Brewers' pitching coach on November 19, 2018. Under Hook, the Brewers further developed one of the most respected 'pitching labs' in baseball, elevating Jacob Misiorowski into a Cy Young Award candidate in 2026, coaching Corbin Burnes to a Cy Young Award in 2021, and developing Freddy Peralta, Devin Williams, Josh Hader and Brandon Woodruff into all-stars. Throughout this time, the Brewers became perennial playoff contenders while maintaining a small-market budget.

Sporting positions
Preceded by Derek Johnson	Milwaukee Brewers pitching coach 2019-present	Succeeded by Incumbent
