= Devin Williams (baseball) =

American baseball player (born 1994)

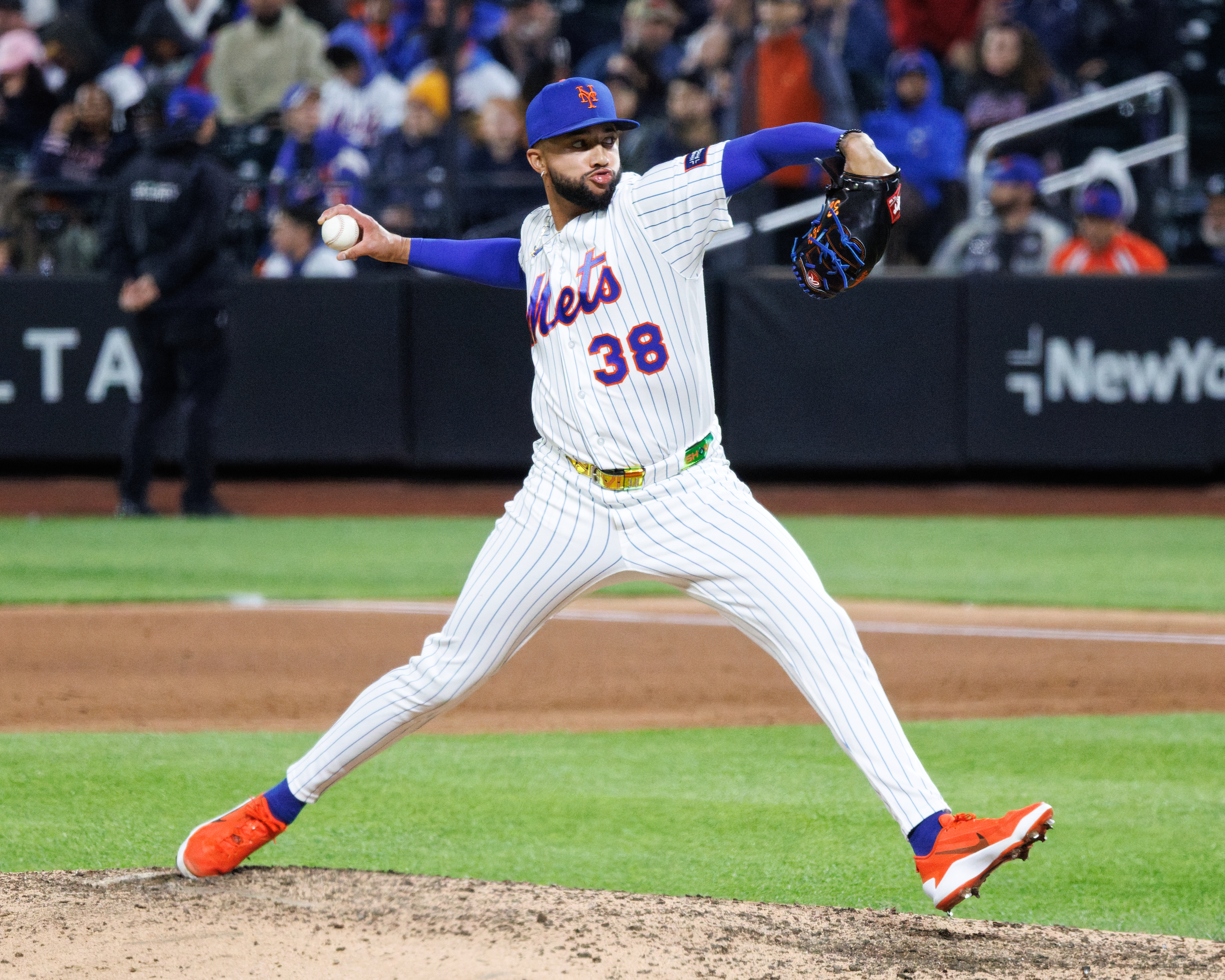
- Williams with the Mets in 2026

New York Mets – No. 38
- Pitcher
- Born: September 21, 1994 (age 32); Florissant, Missouri, U.S.
- Bats: Right Throws: Right

MLB debut
- August 7, 2019, for the Milwaukee Brewers

MLB statistics (through 2026 season)
- Win–loss record: 34–18
- Earned run average: 2.69
- Strikeouts: 517
- Saves: 102
- Stats at Baseball Reference

Teams
- Milwaukee Brewers (2019–2024); New York Yankees (2025); New York Mets (2026–present)

Career highlights and awards
- 2× All-Star (2022, 2023); NL Rookie of the Year (2020); 2× NL Reliever of the Year (2020, 2023)
Medals
Men's baseball
Representing United States
World Baseball Classic
Silver medal – second place	2023 Miami	Team

Devin Terran Williams (born September 21, 1994) is an American professional baseball pitcher for the New York Mets of Major League Baseball (MLB). He has previously played in MLB for the Milwaukee Brewers and New York Yankees. Internationally, Williams represents the United States.

Williams made his MLB debut in 2019 with the Brewers and was named the National League's Rookie of the Year and Reliever of the Year in 2020. He was an MLB All-Star in 2022 and 2023. Following the 2024 season, the Brewers traded him to the Yankees. After the 2025 season, Williams signed a three-year contract with the Mets in free agency.

== Early life ==
Williams was born September 21, 1994, in St. Louis, Missouri, and he was raised by single mother, Angela Norton in the northern part of St. Louis County.

A fan of Cristiano Ronaldo, Williams wanted to play soccer full-time as a child, but his grandfather insisted he play baseball as well, and he found more success with the latter. In his final season with Hazelwood West High School, Williams had a 6–2 win–loss record and 1.15 earned run average (ERA), striking out 101 batters and walking only 28. His fastball speed regularly reached 92 to 94 mph (148 to 151 km/h) that year, and the pitch was supplemented with a slider and a circle changeup.

== Professional career ==
=== Draft and minor leagues (2013–2019) ===
The Milwaukee Brewers of Major League Baseball (MLB) selected Williams in the second round, with the 54th overall pick, of the 2013 MLB draft. At the time, he had committed to playing college baseball for the Missouri Tigers, but Williams signed with the Brewers on June 16 for a $1.35 million signing bonus. After signing with the team, Williams was assigned to the rookie-level Arizona League (AZL) Brewers to begin his professional career. In 13 games there, including six starts, Williams was 1–5 with a 3.38 ERA, striking out 39 batters in 34 2/3 innings pitched.

During spring training in 2017, Williams tore the ulnar collateral ligament of the elbow. He underwent Tommy John surgery and missed the entire season. In 2019, he was chosen to represent the Brewers at the All-Star Futures Game.

=== Milwaukee Brewers (2019–2024) ===
On August 5, 2019, the Brewers selected Williams' contract and promoted him to the major leagues. He made his debut on August 7 against the Pittsburgh Pirates at PNC Park. In 13 appearances with the 2019 Brewers, Williams pitched to a 3.95 ERA while striking out 14 batters in 13 2/3 innings pitched.

Williams was named the National League Reliever of the Month for September 2020. In 13 innings, he surrendered just four hits, no runs and recorded 24 strikeouts. On October 5, 2020, Williams was named the NL Reliever of the Year, capturing 12 of 17 votes. He had a breakout year finishing with an ERA of 0.33, surrendering just 18 hits in 27 innings and 53 strikeouts. He struck out over half the batters he faced in 22 appearances. On November 9, Williams was named the NL Rookie of the Year, becoming the first relief pitcher to win the award since Craig Kimbrel in 2011. His 0.33 ERA was the lowest in a single season with at least 21 innings pitched since earned runs became an official statistic in 1913.

Williams returned to the Brewers' bullpen for the 2021 season. After allowing only a single earned run in 14 relief appearances during August, he was named NL Reliever of the Month for the second time. On September 29, 2021, it was announced that Williams would miss the remainder of the season after fracturing his pitching hand after drinking alcohol and punching a wall following the celebrations following the team's NL Central Division title clinch the Sunday before.

The Brewers traded Josh Hader, their closer, at the 2022 trade deadline, and Williams succeeded him as their closer. In October 2022, it was announced that Williams intended to represent Team USA in the 2023 World Baseball Classic.

On January 13, 2023, Williams agreed to a one-year, $3.35 million contract with the Brewers, avoiding salary arbitration. He had a 1.53 ERA with 36 saves, and won the NL Reliever of the Year award for the second time.

Williams signed a one-year contract for the 2024 season worth $7.25 million with a club option for the 2025 season worth $10.5 million. On March 14, 2024, it was announced that Williams would miss roughly three months of action with two stress fractures in his back. He was activated from the injured list on July 28. In 22 appearances for Milwaukee, Williams logged a 1.25 ERA with 38 strikeouts and 14 saves over 21 2/3 innings pitched.

In the 2024 National League Wild Card Series against the New York Mets, Williams was brought in to close Game 3 with the Brewers leading 2–0. He gave up four runs in the top of the ninth inning from a three-run home run by Pete Alonso and an RBI single by Starling Marte as Milwaukee eventually lost the game 4–2 and their sixth straight playoff series. At the end of the 2024 season, the Brewers declined the option on Williams' contract.

=== New York Yankees (2025) ===
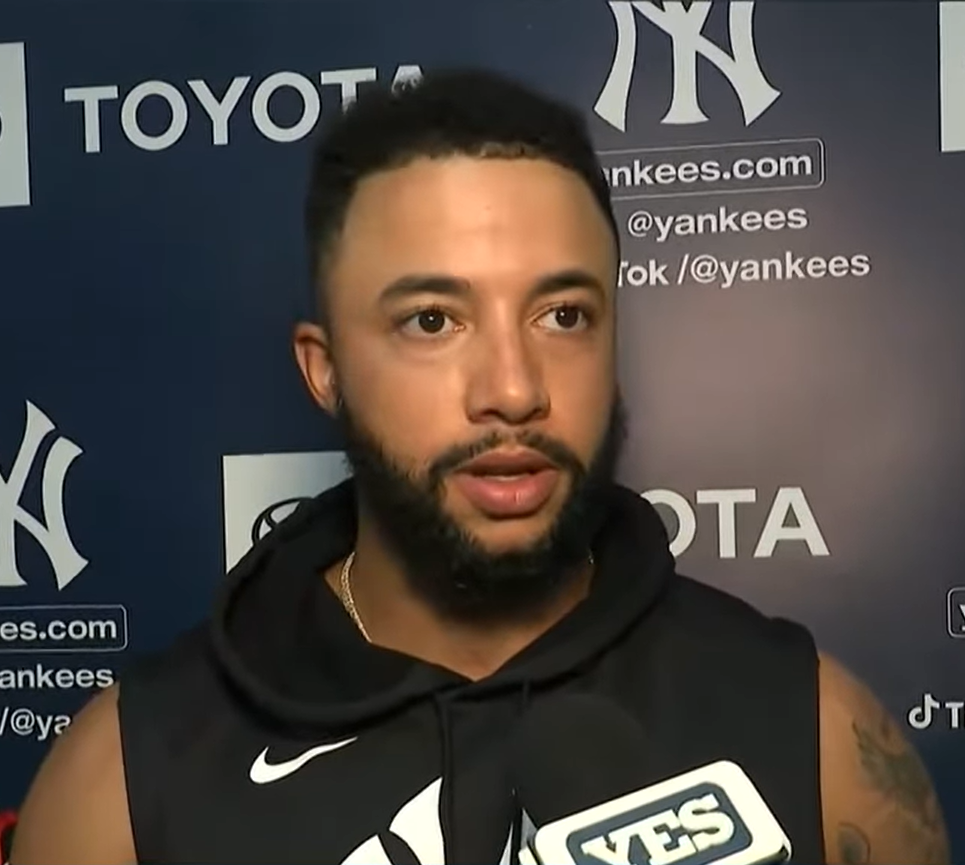
Williams with the Yankees in 2025

On December 13, 2024, the Brewers traded Williams to the New York Yankees in exchange for Nestor Cortes, Caleb Durbin, and cash considerations, with the expectation that he would be the team's closer.

Williams made his Yankees debut on March 4, 2025, when he closed out a 12–3 win over the Philadelphia Phillies during spring training. On April 27, manager Aaron Boone announced that Williams was demoted from the closer role. With him showing improvement and Luke Weaver getting injured, Williams was, in early June, re-inserted as the closer. In 67 appearances for New York, Williams logged a 4.79 ERA with 90 strikeouts and 18 saves over 62 innings pitched.

=== New York Mets ===
On December 3, 2025, Williams signed a three-year, $51 million contract with the New York Mets.

== Pitching style ==
Williams has two primary pitches: a four-seam fastball and a circle changeup with screwball-like movement while rotating the ball off the ring finger during release, which is also similar to a cricket leg-spinner bowling a googly, but at a much faster pace of around 85 mph and with a very high spin-rate of 2,852 rpm. He also has a rarely-used cutter and sinker. In 2020, due to the increased movement on the changeup, he increased its usage and often used it as a strikeout pitch. He refers to his changeup as the "Airbender," a nickname coined by Rob Friedman.
