= Alec Bettinger =

American baseball player (born 1995)

- Pitcher
- Born: July 13, 1995 (age 31); Alexandria, Virginia, U.S.
- Batted: Right Threw: Right

MLB debut
- May 2, 2021, for the Milwaukee Brewers

Last MLB appearance
- July 1, 2021, for the Milwaukee Brewers

MLB statistics
- Win–loss record: 0–1
- Earned run average: 13.50
- Strikeouts: 5
- Stats at Baseball Reference

Teams
- Milwaukee Brewers (2021)

Alec John Bettinger (born July 13, 1995) is an American former professional baseball pitcher. He played in Major League Baseball (MLB) for one season with the Milwaukee Brewers.

== Playing career ==
Bettinger attended Hylton High School in Woodbridge, Virginia and played college baseball at the University of Virginia. He was drafted by the Milwaukee Brewers in the 10th round of the 2017 MLB draft. Bettinger made his professional debut with the rookie ball Helena Brewers. He split the 2018 season between the Single-A Wisconsin Timber Rattlers and the High-A Carolina Mudcats, accumulating a 6–10 record and 5.22 ERA in 25 games. In 2019, Bettinger spent the season in Double-A with the Biloxi Shuckers, pitching to a 5–7 record and 3.44 ERA with 157 strikeouts in 146 1/3 innings of work.

Bettinger did not play in a game in 2020 due to the cancellation of the minor league season because of the COVID-19 pandemic. The Brewers added him to their 40-man roster after the 2020 season.

On April 29, 2021, Bettinger was promoted to the major leagues for the first time. Bettinger made his MLB debut on May 2 as the starting pitcher against the Los Angeles Dodgers, but took the loss as he allowed 11 earned runs in four innings, including grand slams in each of the first two innings, by A. J. Pollock and Matt Beaty. Bettinger became the first player in the National League to allow more than ten earned runs in his major league debut since the earned run became official in 1912.

Bettinger was removed from the 40-man roster and outrighted to the Triple-A Nashville Sounds on May 19, 2022. He made 13 appearances for Nashville in 2022, struggling to a 2–4 record and 6.49 ERA with 21 strikeouts in 34 2/3 innings pitched. Bettinger was released by the Brewers organization on August 6.

On August 23, 2022, Bettinger announced his retirement from professional baseball via Instagram.

== Coaching career ==
On May 3, 2024, Bettinger was announced as a head coach and the head of baseball operations for the Canes Tampa baseball club.
