= Luke Barker =

American baseball player (born 1992)

- Pitcher
- Born: March 11, 1992 (age 34); Chico, California, U.S.
- Batted: Right Threw: Right

MLB debut
- June 3, 2022, for the Milwaukee Brewers

Last MLB appearance
- June 10, 2022, for the Milwaukee Brewers

MLB statistics
- Win–loss record: 0–0
- Earned run average: 11.25
- Strikeouts: 3
- Stats at Baseball Reference

Teams
- Milwaukee Brewers (2022)

Luke William Barker (born March 11, 1992) is an American former professional baseball pitcher. He played in Major League Baseball (MLB) for the Milwaukee Brewers.

== Amateur career ==
Barker grew up in Chico, California and attended Pleasant Valley High School. He then attended California State University, Chico and played college baseball for the Chico State Wildcats for four seasons. Barker was named first team All-California Collegiate Athletic Association (CCAA) and first team Division II All-American after setting a school record with 18 saves as a junior and repeated as an All-CCAA selection after going 4–3 with a 1.73 ERA in 11 starts as a senior.

== Professional career ==
=== Traverse City Beach Bums ===
Unselected in the 2015 Major League Baseball draft, Barker signed with the Traverse City Beach Bums of the independent Frontier League.

=== Milwaukee Brewers ===
He was signed by the Milwaukee Brewers on November 28, 2016. In 2017, Barker was assigned to Single-A Wisconsin Timber Rattlers before earning a promotion to the High-A Carolina Mudcats. He returned to Carolina for the 2018 season and was named the Carolina League Relief Pitcher of the Year after going 6–4 with 20 saves and a 2.21 ERA. Barker was assigned to the Double-A Biloxi Shuckers to begin the 2019 season, where he posted a 1.48 ERA over 23 appearances and was named a Southern League All-Star before being promoted to the Triple-A San Antonio Missions. Barker returned to Triple-A with the Nashville Sounds for the 2021 season. He was assigned to Nashville to begin the 2022 season.

On May 30, 2022, Barker was selected to the 40-man roster and promoted to the major leagues for the first time. On June 1, Barker was optioned back down to Nashville without making an appearance for the Brewers, giving him the distinction of being a phantom ballplayer. On June 3, Barker was recalled to the active roster. Barker made his major league debut with the Brewers the same day. He made 3 total appearances for Milwaukee in 2022, struggling to an 11.25 ERA, but maintaining a neat 5-0 record and 3.60 ERA across 23 appearances for the Triple-A Nashville Sounds.

On July 22, 2022, Barker was diagnosed with a sprained ulnar collateral ligament in his right elbow. The Brewers designated Barker for assignment on August 2. On August 5, he announced that he had undergone Tommy John surgery and would miss the remainder of the season. He was released by Milwaukee the same day.

=== Seattle Mariners ===
On April 15, 2024, Barker signed a minor league contract with the Seattle Mariners. In five appearances for the Triple–A Tacoma Rainiers, he struggled to a 10.80 ERA with six strikeouts across 6 2/3 innings pitched. On May 25, Barker was released by the Mariners organization.
