= Walker McKinven =

American baseball coach

Walker McKinven (born January 28th, 1989) is an American baseball coach.

McKinven graduated from New Trier High School, and played baseball at Binghamton University and Georgia College & State University.

In 2013, McKinven interned with the Chicago Cubs, and remained with the team for the following season. He then joined the Texas Rangers in 2015, and was hired by the Milwaukee Brewers in 2016 as an advance video scout. McKinven was promoted to the major league coaching staff in 2020, became the associate pitching, catching and strategy coach the next year, and was named run prevention coordinator for the 2024 season. In November 2024, McKiven joined the Chicago White Sox as a bench coach under manager Will Venable.
