= Jandel Gustave =

Dominican baseball player (born 1992)

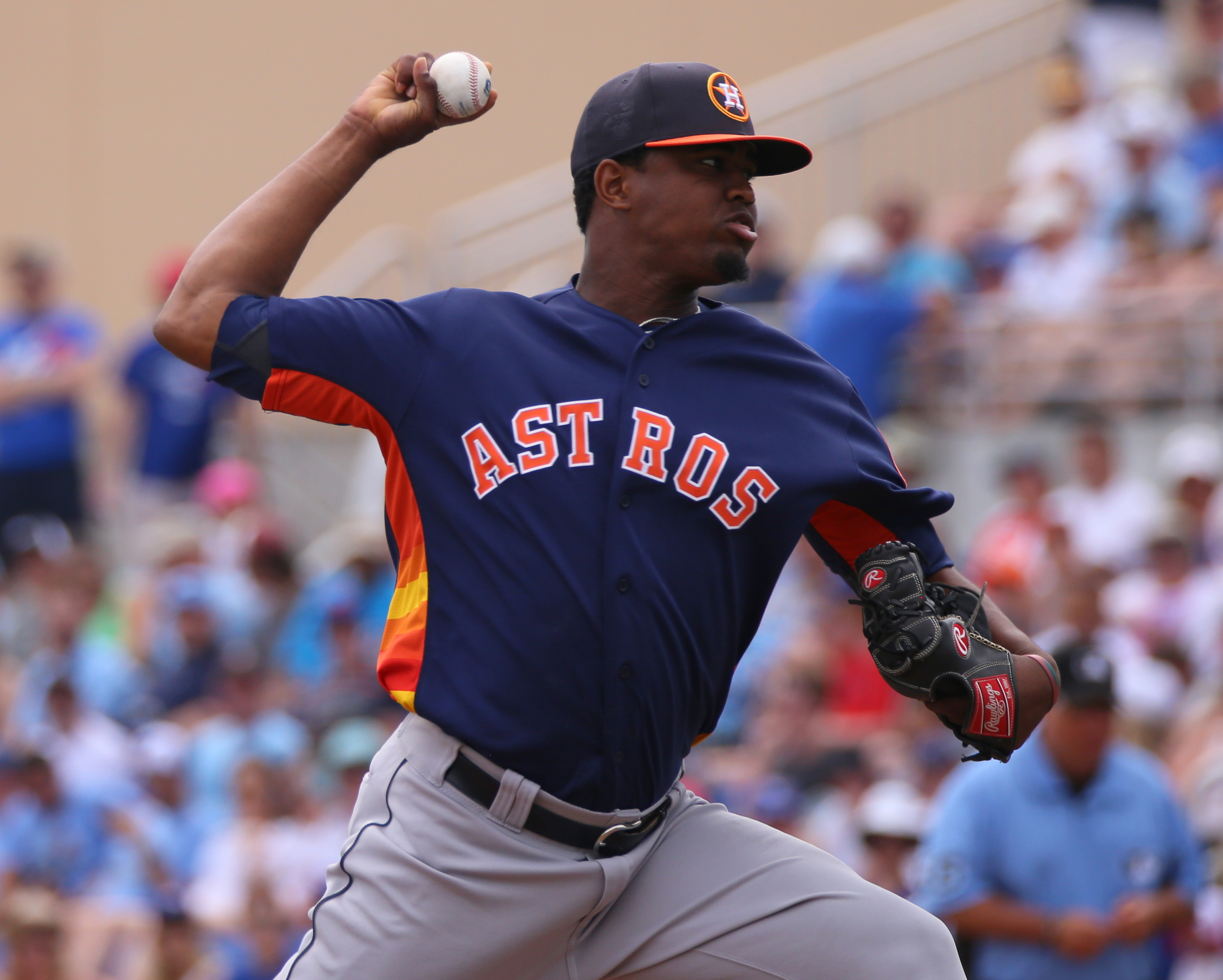
- Gustave pitching for the Houston Astros in 2016 spring training
- Pitcher
- Born: October 12, 1992 (age 34); Pimentel, Dominican Republic
- Batted: Right Threw: Right

MLB debut
- August 11, 2016, for the Houston Astros

Last MLB appearance
- July 31, 2022, for the Milwaukee Brewers

MLB statistics
- Win–loss record: 4–2
- Earned run average: 3.56
- Strikeouts: 72
- Stats at Baseball Reference

Teams
- Houston Astros (2016–2017); San Francisco Giants (2019); Milwaukee Brewers (2021–2022)

Jandel Francisco Gustave (born October 12, 1992) is a Dominican former professional baseball pitcher. He signed with the Houston Astros as an amateur free agent in 2010. Gustave made his MLB debut in 2016 for the Astros and has also played in Major League Baseball (MLB) for the San Francisco Giants and Milwaukee Brewers.

== Career ==
=== Houston Astros ===
Gustave signed with the Houston Astros as an amateur free agent on May 25, 2010, receiving a $40,000 signing bonus. He spent his first two professional seasons with the Dominican Summer League Astros. In 2011 he was 0–4 with a 12.10 ERA in 19.1 innings, walked nearly 30% of batters, and tied for 2nd in the league with 21 wild pitches and 5th in the league with two balks. He played for the Gulf Coast League Astros in 2012, for whom he was 2–1 with a 5.79 ERA in 28 innings, 3rd in the league with 27 walks (his 8.7 walks per 9 innings were the worst in the league), tied for 3rd in the league with 7 wild pitches, and tied for 4th in the league with two balks.

In 2013, he pitched for the Greeneville Astros of the Rookie-level Appalachian League, pitching to a 2–3 win–loss record and a 2.68 earned run average (ERA). He played for the Quad Cities River Bandits of the Class A Midwest League in 2014, finishing the year with a 5–5 win–loss record and a 5.01 ERA, and tied for the Midwest League with 13 hit batsmen (in 79 innings), and tied for 7th in the league with 14 wild pitches.

After the 2014 season, the Boston Red Sox selected Gustave from the Astros in the 2014 Rule 5 draft, and traded him to the Kansas City Royals. During spring training in 2015, the Royals placed Gustave on waivers, and he was claimed by the San Diego Padres. The Padres then returned Gustave to the Astros before the start of the regular season.

Gustave pitched for the Corpus Christi Hooks of the Class AA Texas League in 2015. He pitched to a 5–2 record and a 2.15 ERA with 20 saves, and was named a postseason All-Star. The Astros added him to their 40-man roster after the season.

Gustave began the 2016 season with the Fresno Grizzlies of the Class AAA Pacific Coast League, and was promoted to the major leagues on August 10. With Fresno, he was 3–3 with a 3.79 ERA in 57 innings, tied for the league lead with 8 hit batsmen, and tied for 5th in the league with two balks.

The Astros chose Gustave for their 2017 Opening Day roster. He went on the disabled list for a muscle strain on April 19, 2017. In June, he underwent Tommy John surgery, ending his chances of playing for the rest of the season. In 6 appearances, Gustave finished 0–0 with a 5.40 ERA. He missed the entire 2018 season while recovering from Tommy John surgery. He was outrighted to the minors and removed from the 40-man roster on October 31, 2018.

=== San Francisco Giants ===
On February 15, 2019, Gustave signed a minor league contract with the San Francisco Giants. On July 18, the Giants selected Gustave's contract. In 2019 in the minor leagues Gustave was 2–2 with seven saves and a 5.52 ERA in 32 games (one start) in which he pitched 29.1 innings. With the Giants, he was 0–0 with one save and a 2.96 ERA in 23 relief appearances in which he pitched 24.1 innings.

On August 2, 2020, the Giants designated Gustave for assignment. He was outrighted on August 9.

=== Pittsburgh Pirates ===
On September 5, 2020, Gustave signed a minor league contract with the Pittsburgh Pirates. Gustave was assigned to the Triple-A Indianapolis Indians to begin the 2021 season. In 15 appearances for Indianapolis, Gustave was 1-0 and logged a 3.60 ERA with 18 strikeouts.

=== Milwaukee Brewers ===
On June 25, 2021, Gustave was traded to the Milwaukee Brewers along with Troy Stokes Jr. in exchange for Samuel Escudero. On July 7, Gustave was selected to the active roster. He made 14 appearances for Milwaukee down the stretch, recording a 1–2 record and 3.44 ERA with 13 strikeouts in 18.1 innings pitched. In 2022, Gustave made 27 appearances for the Brewers, logging a 2–0 record and 3.86 ERA with 27 strikeouts in 28.0 innings of work. On November 18, 2022, Gustave was non-tendered and became a free agent.

=== Arizona Diamondbacks ===
On January 31, 2023, Gustave signed a minor league contract with the Arizona Diamondbacks organization. Gustave was assigned to the Triple-A Reno Aces, but struggled to a 16.43 ERA across 9 appearances before he was placed on the injured list in late April. On May 23, Gustave was released by the Diamondbacks.

== Personal life ==
Gustave's mother died when he was two years old. He and his two siblings were raised by his maternal grandmother. To support her grandchildren, the family moved from Pimentel to Santo Domingo.

Gustave is of Haitian descent.
