= Miguel Sánchez (baseball) =

Dominican baseball player (born 1993)

- Pitcher
- Born: December 31, 1993 (age 32); Bonao, Dominican Republic
- Batted: Right Threw: Right

MLB debut
- June 22, 2021, for the Milwaukee Brewers

Last MLB appearance
- June 21, 2022, for the Milwaukee Brewers

MLB statistics
- Win–loss record: 3–2
- Earned run average: 4.12
- Strikeouts: 32
- Stats at Baseball Reference

Teams
- Milwaukee Brewers (2021–2022)

Miguel Angel Sánchez (born December 31, 1993) is a Dominican former professional baseball pitcher. He previously played in Major League Baseball (MLB) for the Milwaukee Brewers.

== Early life ==
When Sanchez didn't receive any MLB contract offers as a 16 or 17 year old he took a job as a security guard at a bar in Los Arroces. A coach convinced Sanchez to get back into baseball by joining the Dominican Air Force to play in an amateur baseball league to potentially catch the eye of scouts. Sanchez continued to work his job as a security guard during this time.

== Career ==
On January 26, 2016, Sánchez signed with the Milwaukee Brewers as an international free agent for $6,000. He made his professional debut with the Dominican Summer League Brewers, and also played for the Rookie-level AZL Brewers and the Single-A Wisconsin Timber Rattlers. In 18 games between the three teams, he posted a 2–2 record and 3.66 ERA.

Sánchez returned to Wisconsin for the 2017 season, posting a 3–6 record and 4.36 ERA in 32 appearances. The next year, he split the season between the High-A Carolina Mudcats, the Double-A Biloxi Shuckers, and the Triple-A Colorado Springs Sky Sox, logging a cumulative 2.52 ERA with 95 strikeouts in 64 1/3 innings of work. In 2019, Sánchez played for the Triple-A San Antonio Missions, pitching to a 4–5 record and 4.35 ERA with 62 strikeouts in 60 innings pitched.

Sánchez did not play in a game in 2020 due to the cancellation of the minor league season because of the COVID-19 pandemic. He was assigned to the Triple-A Nashville Sounds to begin the 2021 season, and recorded a 3.22 ERA in 16 appearances with the team.

On June 22, 2021, Sánchez was selected to the 40-man roster and promoted to the major leagues for the first time. He made his debut later that night, throwing a scoreless inning against the Arizona Diamondbacks. He made 28 appearances for Milwaukee in his rookie campaign, registering a 4.15 ERA with 23 strikeouts in 26 innings pitched.

Sánchez made 12 appearances out of the Brewers' bullpen in 2022, logging a 4.05 ERA with 9 strikeouts in 13 1/3 innings of work. On June 25, 2022, he was placed on the injured list with UCL discomfort in his right elbow. While rehabbing with Triple-A Nashville, Sánchez suffered a setback in his recovery and was placed on the 60-day injured list. On October 27, he was removed from the 40-man roster and sent outright to the Nashville. Sánchez elected free agency following the season on November 10.
