= Néstor Corredor =

Venezuelan baseball player and coach (born 1984)

Milwaukee Brewers – No. 98
- Coach / Manager
- Born: May 25, 1984 (age 42); Acarigua, Portuguesa, Venezuela
- Bats: Right Throws: Right

Teams
- Milwaukee Brewers (2023–present)

Career highlights and awards
- World Series champion (2026)
Medals
Men's baseball
Manager for Venezuela
U-23 Baseball World Cup
Gold medal – first place	2026 Nicaragua	Team
Coach for Venezuela
World Baseball Classic
Gold medal – first place	2026 Miami	Team

Néstor Corredor Cárdenas (born May 25, 1984) is a Venezuelan professional baseball coach who currently serves as field coordinator for the Milwaukee Brewers. Corredor has managed extensively in the Brewers organization as well as in winter league baseball.

== Coaching career ==
At just 26 years old, Corredor was named manager of the Dominican Summer League Brewers for the 2010 season; he managed in the DSL until 2012. From 2013 to 2015, he managed the Brewers'Arizona Fall League affiliate. From 2016 to 2019, he managed in the rookie-advanced Pioneer League with the Helena Brewers, and later, the Rocky Mountain Vibes.

Corredor was appointed manager of the Águilas del Zulia of the Venezuelan Professional Baseball League just days before the opening of the 2023–24 season, after the unexpected departure of Pat Listach. He was appointed to head the Venezuelan U-23 team at the U-23 Baseball World Cup in November 2026. He was also named as part of the coaching staff for the Tiburones de La Guaira for the 2026–27 LVBP season.

He was part of the Brewers coaching staff that won the franchise's first World Series title in 2026, defeating the Tampa Bay Rays in five games. In doing so, he became one of four Venezuelans on the team to have won both a World Series title and a World Baseball Classic title in the same year (the others begin Jackson Chourio, Antonio Senzatela, and William Contreras).

== Personal life ==
Corredor has resided in Arizona since 2015. He was naturalized as a US citizen in 2025.
