= Josh Hader =

American baseball player (born 1994)

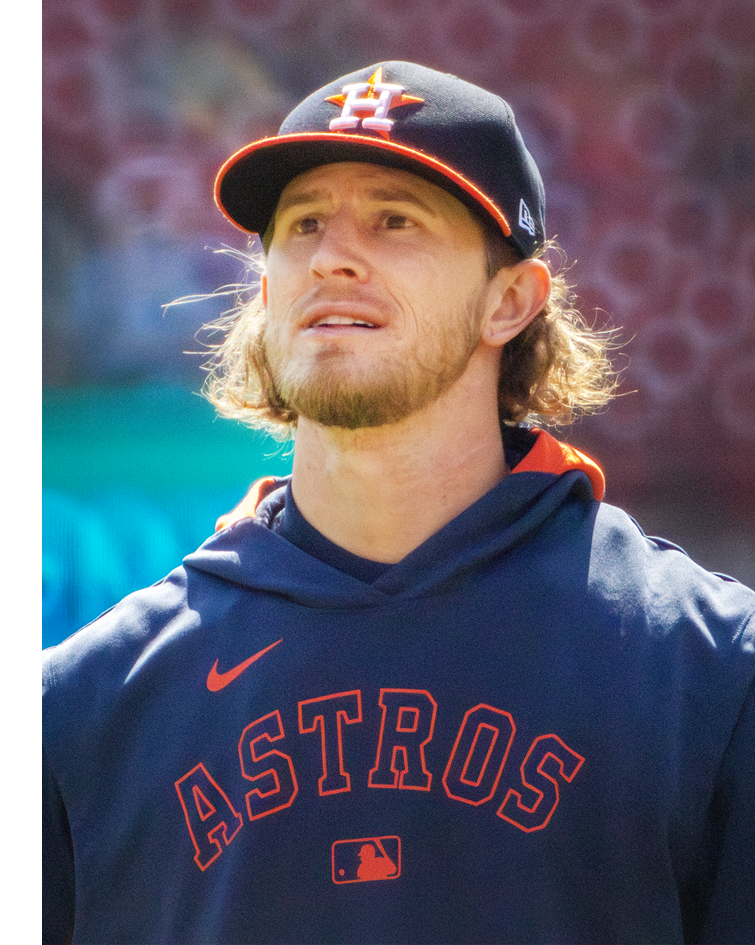
- Hader with the Houston Astros in 2025

Houston Astros – No. 71
- Pitcher
- Born: April 7, 1994 (age 32); Millersville, Maryland, U.S.
- Bats: Left Throws: Left

MLB debut
- June 10, 2017, for the Milwaukee Brewers

MLB statistics (through 2026 season)
- Win–loss record: 38–33
- Earned run average: 2.50
- Strikeouts: 884
- Saves: 253
- Stats at Baseball Reference

Teams
- Milwaukee Brewers (2017–2022); San Diego Padres (2022–2023); Houston Astros (2024–present)

Career highlights and awards
- 6× All-Star (2018, 2019, 2021–2023, 2025); 3× All-MLB First Team (2019, 2021, 2023); 3× NL Reliever of the Year (2018, 2019, 2021); NL saves leader (2020); Pitched a combined no-hitter on September 11, 2021
Medals
Men's baseball
Representing United States
Pan American Games
Silver medal – second place	2015 Toronto	Team

Joshua Ronald Hader (born April 7, 1994) is an American professional baseball pitcher for the Houston Astros of Major League Baseball (MLB). He has previously played in MLB for the Milwaukee Brewers and San Diego Padres. Hader is a six-time All-Star and three-time winner of the National League Reliever of the Year Award.

The Baltimore Orioles selected him in the 19th round of the 2012 MLB draft. He was traded twice, including to the Astros, before joining the Milwaukee Brewers organization in 2015. Hader played for the United States national team in the Pan American Games in 2015 and appeared in the All-Star Futures Game in 2016. As a member of the Brewers, Hader made his MLB debut in 2017. In 2021, he became the fastest pitcher in major league history to reach 400 strikeouts. The Brewers traded Hader to the Padres in 2022. Hader signed with the Astros in 2024. Since 2018, Hader has made six All-Star and three All-MLB First Team appearances.

== Early life ==
Hader attended Old Mill High School in Millersville, Maryland, where he played for the school's baseball team. As a senior, Hader had a 10–0 win–loss record, a 0.30 earned run average (ERA), and 125 strikeouts. He also had a batting average above .400 and hit four homeruns. After graduating from high school, Hader was prepared to enroll at Anne Arundel Community College.

== Professional career ==
=== Baltimore Orioles (2012–2013) ===
The Baltimore Orioles selected Hader in the 19th round of the 2012 MLB draft, with the 582nd overall selection. He signed with the Orioles for a $40,000 signing bonus, rather than attend Anne Arundel. Beginning his professional career, Hader's fastball velocity increased, from 84–88 miles per hour (135–142 km/h) as a high school player, to 94–95 miles per hour (151–153 km/h) as he changed his workout routine.

Hader played for the Gulf Coast Orioles in the rookie-level Gulf Coast League and the Aberdeen Ironbirds of the Low-A New York–Penn League, allowing only 14 hits and nine walks while striking out 48 in 28 2/3 innings pitched. In 2013, the Orioles assigned Hader to the Delmarva Shorebirds of the Single-A South Atlantic League (SAL). He appeared in the SAL All-Star Game, and through July 31, pitched to a 3–6 record with 79 strikeouts and a 2.65 ERA in 17 games started.

=== Houston Astros (2013–2015) ===
On July 31, 2013, the day of the MLB trade deadline, the Orioles traded Hader and L. J. Hoes to the Houston Astros in exchange for Bud Norris. He completed his 2013 season with the Quad Cities River Bandits of the Single-A Midwest League.

Pitching for the Lancaster JetHawks of the High-A California League in 2014, Hader and two relief pitchers combined to throw a no-hitter on May 13. After pitching to a 9–2 record with a league-leading 2.70 ERA and 112 strikeouts in 103 1/3 innings, the Astros promoted him to the Corpus Christi Hooks of the Double-A Texas League in August. He was named the California League Pitcher of the Year. Hader returned to Corpus Christi in the 2015 season. He was selected to play for the United States national baseball team in the 2015 Pan American Games.

=== Milwaukee Brewers (2015–2022) ===
On July 30, 2015, the Astros traded Hader, Brett Phillips, Domingo Santana, and Adrian Houser to the Milwaukee Brewers for Carlos Gómez and Mike Fiers. The Brewers assigned Hader to the Biloxi Shuckers of the Double-A Southern League. He finished the season with a 3.03 ERA combined.

The Brewers invited him to spring training in 2016. Hader began the 2016 season with Biloxi, and made his first start for the Colorado Springs Sky Sox of the Triple-A Pacific Coast League on June 12. He was selected to appear in the 2016 All-Star Futures Game. The Brewers added him to their 40-man roster after the season.

Hader began the 2017 season with Colorado Springs. The Brewers promoted him to the major leagues on June 9. He made his major league debut on June 10.

Hader began 2018 in the Milwaukee bullpen. On April 30, Hader became the first pitcher ever to record eight strikeouts in an outing that was less than three innings long. He recorded a 2 2/3-inning save against the Cincinnati Reds, in which he faced nine batters, recording eight strikeouts and one walk. Owning a 1.21 ERA with 83 strikeouts in 44 innings, Hader was named to the 2018 MLB All-Star Game. Hader appeared in the 2018 All-Star Game at the top of the eighth inning. During his appearance, he gave up hits to Rangers' Shin-Soo Choo and Astros' George Springer before Mariners' Jean Segura hit a home run to left field to give the American All-Stars a 5–2 lead. After giving up a single to Boston Red Sox baseman Mitch Moreland, Hader was replaced after 26 pitches, allowing four hits and one out over five batters.

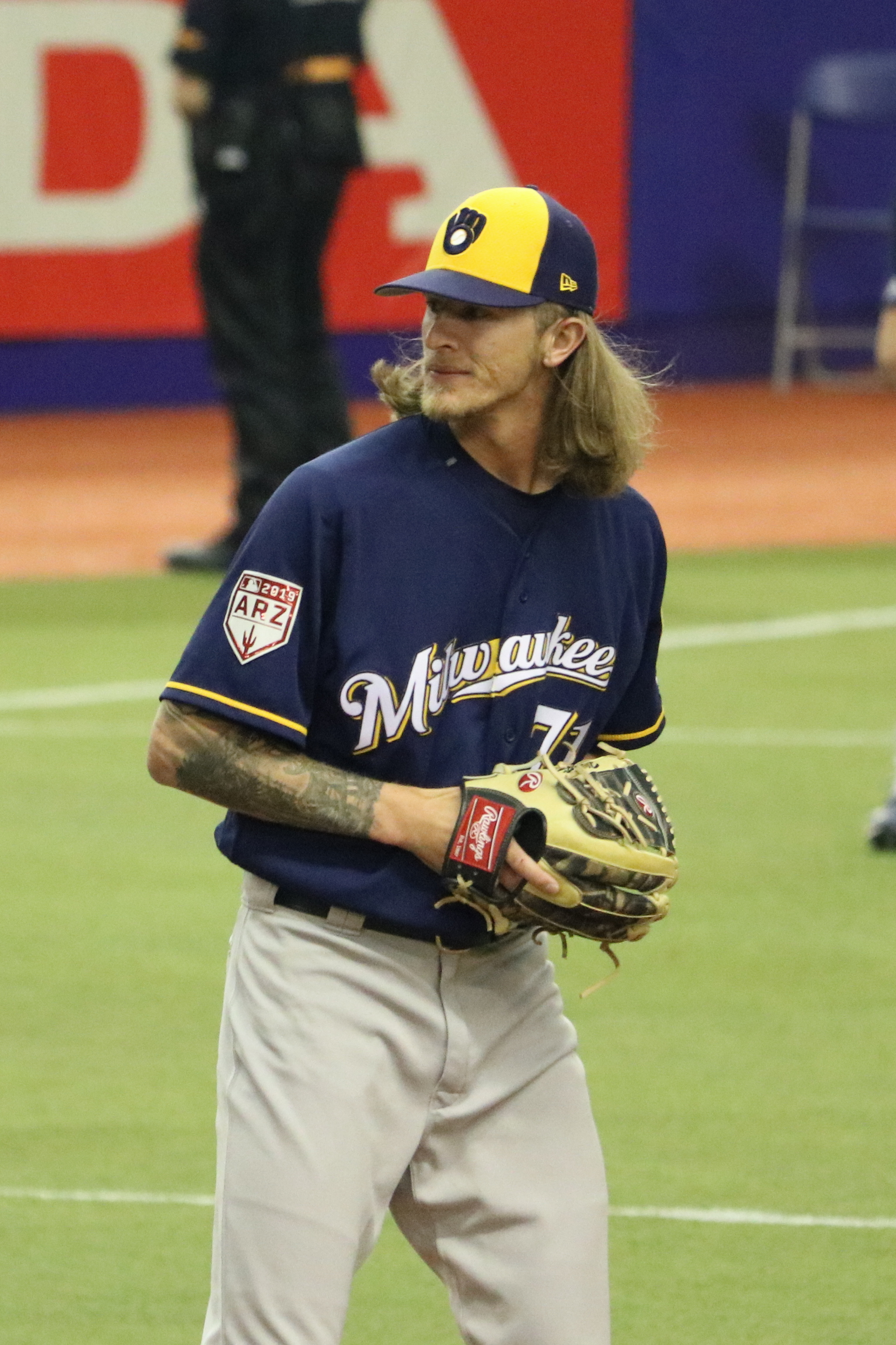
Hader during a game in 2019

In 2018, Hader was 6–1 with 12 saves and a 2.43 ERA. He had 143 strikeouts in 81 1/3 innings. Among MLB pitchers who threw at least 20 innings, Hader held left-handed batters to the lowest batting average (.088). He won the National League Reliever of the Year Award, becoming the first non-full-time closer to win the award.

Hader began the 2019 season as the Brewers' closer following injuries to fellow relievers Jeremy Jeffress (shoulder strain) and Corey Knebel (Tommy John surgery). On March 30, Hader pitched an immaculate inning to earn the save against the St. Louis Cardinals, striking out Tyler O'Neill, Dexter Fowler, and Yairo Munoz on nine consecutive strikes, seven of which were swinging strikes. Hader received the NL Reliever of the Month Award for both May and June. In the 2019 National League Wild Card Game, Hader blew the save for the Brewers, giving up a three-run single to Juan Soto of the Washington Nationals, which, coupled with an error from right fielder Trent Grisham, led to Washington's go-ahead run scoring on the play and resulted in the Brewers eventually losing the game. Hader finished his 2019 season with a 3–5 record, a 2.62 ERA, and 138 strikeouts over 72 2/3 relief innings. He won his second consecutive NL Reliever of the Year Award.

Hader began the 2020 season with 12 consecutive hitless appearances, the longest such streak in major league history. Hader finished the season with a 3.79 ERA and an NL-leading 13 saves in 15 chances.

On May 8, 2021, Hader reached 400 strikeouts faster than any other pitcher in MLB history, doing so in 234 2/3 innings pitched, breaking the prior record of 236 innings, which had been set by Craig Kimbrel in 2014. For July, Hader was named NL Reliever of the Month, the fourth time he won the award. On September 11, Hader pitched the ninth inning to close out a combined no-hitter against the Cleveland Indians. He finished the 2021 season with 34 saves in 35 opportunities; he recorded a career-low 1.23 ERA with 102 strikeouts in 58 2/3 innings.

=== San Diego Padres (2022–2023) ===
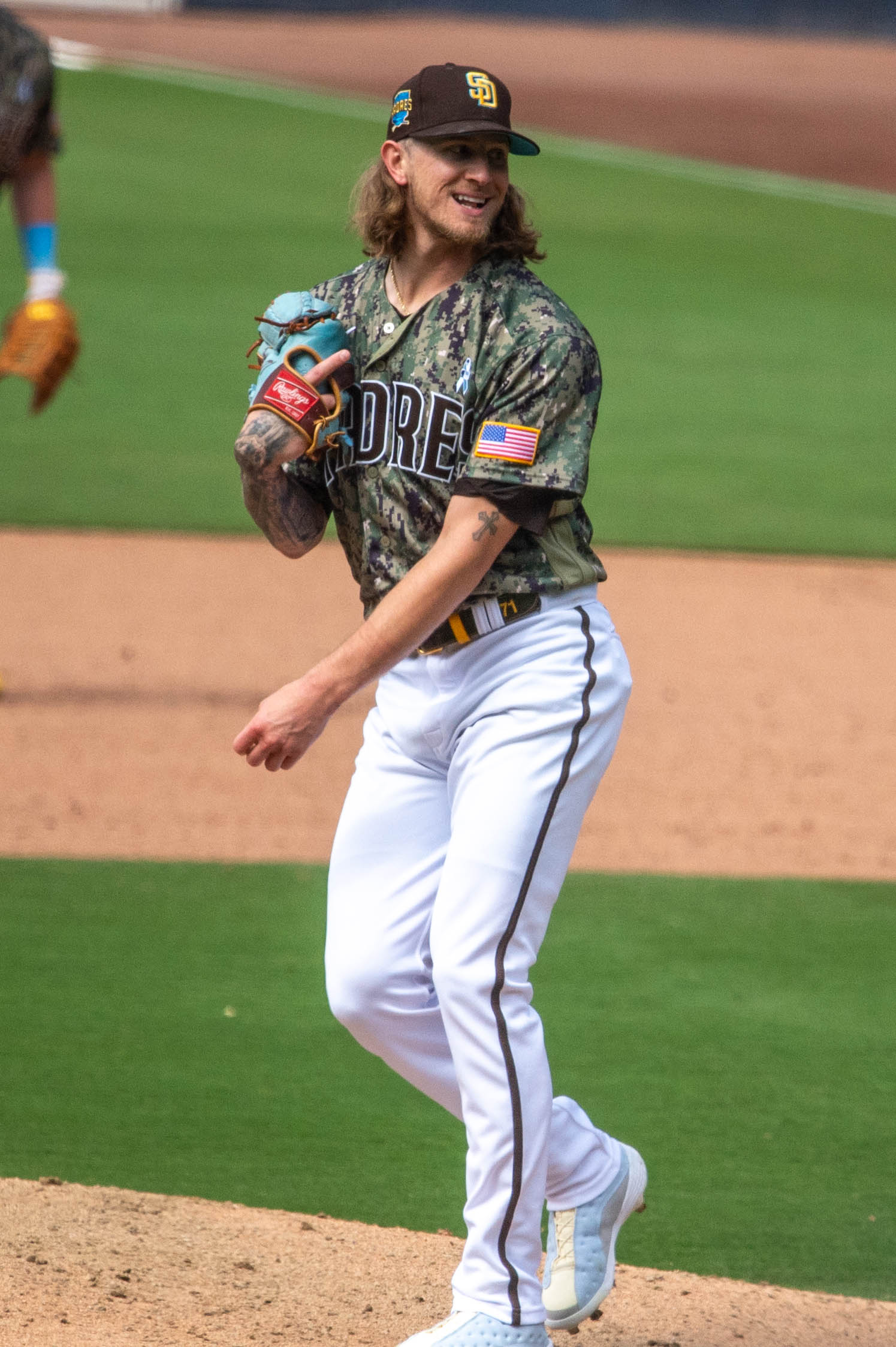
Hader pitching for the Padres.

After beginning the 2022 season with 25 saves in 27 appearances and a 1.05 ERA, Hader’s pitching declined during the summer, and on August 1, the Brewers traded him to the San Diego Padres for Taylor Rogers, Dinelson Lamet, Esteury Ruiz, and Robert Gasser. He made his Padres debut the following day, earning the win against the Colorado Rockies. However, his struggles continued, including a stretch of earning only two saves in 13 appearances, with an increased ERA of 6.52. On August 20, the Padres announced that they would use a closer committee to give Hader a 'little break' from save chances. He regained his all-star form in September, and was instrumental in the Padres' postseason run.

On January 13, 2023, Hader signed a one-year, $14.1 million contract with the Padres, avoiding salary arbitration. Hader was named the NL Reliever of the Month for April after recording 10 saves and holding opposing batters to a .093 batting average while allowing only one run in 13 innings pitched. He became a free agent following the season.

=== Houston Astros (2024–present) ===
On January 22, 2024, Hader signed a five-year, $95 million contract to return to the Houston Astros organization. Hader earned his first win as an Astro on April 30, while making his first two-inning appearance since 2019 and first of at least four outs since August 14, 2020, as Víctor Caratini hit a pinch hit, walk-off, two-run home run in the bottom of the 10th inning. On August 10, against the Boston Red Sox, Hader converted his 25th consecutive save opportunity, surpassing Brad Lidge's franchise record of 24, and extended that streak to 29 total. For the month of August, Hader surrendered one earned run over 13 1/3 innings (0.68 ERA), 0.60 WHIP and .071 BAA, and was recognized as American League (AL) Reliever of the Month, his seventh career monthly award.

On September 13, 2024, Hader recorded his 30th save, reaching the milestone for a fourth consecutive season, as the Astros collected the 5,000th win in franchise history by defeating the Los Angeles Angels, 5–3. Hader made 71 regular season appearances in 2024, posting an 8–8 record, 3.80 ERA, 71 innings, 43 hits, 12 home runs, and 25 walks surrendered and 105 strikeouts. He was ninth in the AL in appearances, second in games finished (62) and second in saves (34); both his appearances and games finished totals represented career highs. Hader became the 12th major league reliever to attain 100 or more strikeouts over four seasons. (Note: The record was five, attained by Rich Gossage, Rollie Fingers, Aroldis Chapman, and Dellin Betances. Criteria: Number of seasons player meets criteria, up to 2024, at least 80% games in relief, in the regular season, requiring strikeouts ≥ 100, sorted by descending instances.)

Hader earned his 200th career save on Opening Day, 2025, when he struck out Juan Soto of the New York Mets with two runners on to secure a 3–1 Astros win. Hader earned the save of the 7–4 win over the Chicago Cubs on June 27, his 22nd straight converted to start the 2025 season, which surpassed Dave Smith's club record accomplished in 1989. For June, Hader surrendered 3 earned runs over 13 2/3 innings (1.98 ERA) and struck out 22 batters, and was recognized as American League (AL) Reliever of the Month, his eighth career monthly award. On July 6, Hader was announced as a reserve pitcher for the American League at the MLB All-Star Game, his sixth career selection. He made 48 total appearances for Houston, compiling a 6-2 record and 2.05 ERA with 76 strikeouts and 28 saves across 52 2/3 innings pitched. On August 15, Hader was diagnosed with a capsule sprain in his left shoulder, and missed the remainder of the year. He was named the Astros' nominee for the Roberto Clemente Award, and was recognized by the Houston chapter of the Baseball Writers' Association of America (BBWAA) as the recipient of the Darryl Kile Good Guy Award.

On March 11, 2026, it was announced that Hader would begin the season on the injured list due to left biceps tendinitis. He was transferred to the 60-day injured list on April 17. Hader was activated for his season debut on June 2. On August, 19, Hader logged the 500th appearance and 245th save of his career, passing Dan Quisenberry for 41st on the latter chart. On September 4, he accrued his 250th career save by striking out the side in a 3–1 win versus the Arizona Diamondbacks, becoming the sixth left-hander to do so. He registered the third-most consecutive shutout appearances in the major leagues (18) that lasted through September 5, also the fourth-longest scoreless innings streak (19). (Note: Longest streak of consecutive games, in 2026, As relief pitcher, in the regular season, within a single season, requiring runs allowed ≤ 0 and innings pitched ≥ 1, sorted by most games matching criteria.) For the second consecutive season, Hader became Houston's nominee for the Roberto Clemente Award.. In 45 appearances, Hader went 4–1, 1.01 ERA, 0.761 WHIP, 26 saves, and 55 strikeouts. He ranked eighth in the AL saves and 10hth in games finished (37), and his ERA ranked as the lowest among all pitchers with at least 40 IP in the major leagues. Hader worked a scoreless appearance in both of the two Wild Card Series games, allowing three hits. However, the Chicago White Sox swept the Astros to eliminate them from the playoffs.

== Personal life ==
Hader is the son of Tom and Patricia Hader. Hader is married to Maria Hader. The couple's first child was born in June 2022.

During the 2018 Major League Baseball All-Star Game, a series of tweets by Hader ranging from mid-2011 to late-2012 were discovered to contain racist, homophobic and sexist content. Friends and family of Hader who were invited to the game were given blank jerseys to wear due to the controversy. Hader issued an apology after the game and deleted his account on Twitter.

== See also ==
- Houston Astros award winners and league leaders
- List of Major League Baseball career games finished leaders
- List of Major League Baseball career saves leaders
- List of Major League Baseball no-hitters
- List of Pan American Games medalists in baseball

== Notes ==
Awards and achievements
Preceded by Tyler Gilbert	No-hitter pitcher September 11, 2021 (with Corbin Burnes)	Succeeded by Tylor Megill; Drew Smith; Joely Rodríguez; Seth Lugo; Edwin Díaz
Preceded by Aroldis Chapman	American League Reliever of the Month; August 2026	Succeeded by Cade Smith
