= 2022 Pittsburgh Pirates season =

2022 Pittsburgh Pirates
- League: National League
- Division: Central
- Ballpark: PNC Park
- City: Pittsburgh, Pennsylvania (Note: From 1882–1906, the team played in Allegheny, Pennsylvania, which became annexed by Pittsburgh as the North Side in 1907.)
- Record: 62–100 (.383)
- Divisional place: T-4th
- Owners: Bob Nutting
- President: Travis Williams
- General managers: Ben Cherington
- Managers: Derek Shelton
- Television: AT&T SportsNet Pittsburgh
- Radio: KDKA-FM; Pittsburgh Pirates Radio Network; Greg Brown, Joe Block, Bob Walk, John Wehner, Michael McKenry, Matt Capps, Kevin Young, Neil Walker
- Stats: ESPN.com; Baseball Reference

The 2022 Pittsburgh Pirates season was the franchise's 141st season overall, 136th season as a member of the National League, and 22nd season at PNC Park.

On December 2, 2021, Commissioner of Baseball Rob Manfred announced a lockout of players, following expiration of the collective bargaining agreement (CBA) between the league and the Major League Baseball Players Association (MLBPA). On March 10, 2022, MLB and the MLBPA agreed to a new collective bargaining agreement, thus ending the lockout. Opening Day was played on April 7. Although MLB previously announced that several series would be cancelled due to the lockout, the agreement provides for a 162-game season, with originally canceled games to be made up via doubleheaders. The Pirates set a major league record during the season: most games to start a season without a victory for the starting Pirates pitcher, who did not record a win until May 9, the 28th game of the season.

The team experienced another heavily losing season, finishing with a record of 62–100 (.383), improving upon the prior season's record by only one win. They were 31 games behind the NL Central-winning Cardinals. Despite the team's shortcomings, the team swept the Los Angeles Dodgers at Dodger Stadium for the first time in franchise history. Additionally, shortstop Oneil Cruz recorded the fastest-hit ball in Statcast history with a 122.4 mph single in a 14–2 loss against the Atlanta Braves. Because the eventual National League champions, the Phillies, reached the playoffs for the first time in 11 years, the Pirates now hold the National League's longest active playoff drought, not having made the playoffs since 2015. The Pirates finished tied for fourth place in the National League Central.

== Offseason ==
=== Lockout ===
The expiration of the league's collective bargaining agreement (CBA) with the Major League Baseball Players Association occurred on December 1, 2021 with no new agreement in place. As a result, the team owners voted unanimously to lockout the players stopping all free agency and trades.

The parties came to an agreement on a new CBA on March 10, 2022.

=== Rule changes ===
Pursuant to the new CBA, several new rules were instituted for the 2022 season. The National League will adopt the designated hitter full-time, a draft lottery will be implemented, the postseason will expand from ten teams to twelve, and advertising patches will appear on player uniforms and helmets for the first time.

== Regular season ==
=== National League Central ===
NL Central
Team	W	L	Pct.	GB	Home	Road
St. Louis Cardinals	93	69	.574	—	53‍–‍28	40‍–‍41
Milwaukee Brewers	86	76	.531	7	46‍–‍35	40‍–‍41
Chicago Cubs	74	88	.457	19	37‍–‍44	37‍–‍44
Pittsburgh Pirates	62	100	.383	31	34‍–‍47	28‍–‍53
Cincinnati Reds	62	100	.383	31	33‍–‍48	29‍–‍52

=== National League Wild Card ===
Division leaders
Team	W	L	Pct.
Los Angeles Dodgers	111	51	.685
Atlanta Braves	101	61	.623
St. Louis Cardinals	93	69	.574

Wild Card teams (Top 3 teams qualify for postseason)
Team	W	L	Pct.	GB
New York Mets	101	61	.623	+14
San Diego Padres	89	73	.549	+2
Philadelphia Phillies	87	75	.537	—
Milwaukee Brewers	86	76	.531	1
San Francisco Giants	81	81	.500	6
Arizona Diamondbacks	74	88	.457	13
Chicago Cubs	74	88	.457	13
Miami Marlins	69	93	.426	18
Colorado Rockies	68	94	.420	19
Pittsburgh Pirates	62	100	.383	25
Cincinnati Reds	62	100	.383	25
Washington Nationals	55	107	.340	32

=== Record vs. opponents ===
2022 National League record Source: MLB Standings Grid – 2022
Team	AZ	ATL	CHC	CIN	COL	LAD	MIA	MIL	NYM	PHI	PIT	SD	SF	STL	WSH	AL
Arizona	—	2–4	4–3	3–4	9–10	5–14	5–1	4–3	2–4	3–3	4–3	5–14	10–9	2–5	4–3	12–8
Atlanta	4–2	—	3–3	4–3	6–1	2–4	13–6	3–3	10–9	11–8	7–0	3–4	4–3	4–3	14–5	13–7
Chicago	3–4	3–3	—	11–8	3–4	0–7	4–2	10–9	4–3	6–0	10–9	2–5	2–5	6–13	4–2	6–14
Cincinnati	4–3	3–4	8–11	—	2–4	0–7	4–3	6–13	1–5	1–6	7–12	0–6	4–2	7–12	3–4	12–8
Colorado	10–9	1–6	4–3	4–2	—	8–11	2–4	3–4	2–5	2–5	3–3	10–9	5–14	2–4	3–4	9–11
Los Angeles	14–5	4–2	7–0	7–0	11–8	—	6–1	4–3	3–4	3–4	1–5	14–5	15–4	4–2	3–3	15–5
Miami	1–5	6–13	2–4	3–4	4–2	1–6	—	4–3	6–13	7–12	4–3	3–4	3–4	2–4	15–4	8–12
Milwaukee	3–4	3–3	9–10	13–6	4–3	3–4	3–4	—	2–4	2–4	11–8	3–4	3–4	9–10	3–3	15–5
New York	4–2	9–10	3–4	5–1	5–2	4–3	13–6	4–2	—	14–5	6–1	2–4	4–3	5–2	14–5	9–11
Philadelphia	3–3	8–11	0–6	6–1	5–2	4–3	12–7	4–2	5–14	—	6–1	4–3	1–5	4–3	16–3	9–11
Pittsburgh	3–4	0–7	9–10	12–7	3–3	5–1	3–4	8–11	1–6	1–6	—	2–4	1–5	6–13	4–3	4–16
San Diego	14–5	4–3	5–2	6–0	9–10	5–14	4–3	4–3	4–2	3–4	4–2	—	13–6	2–4	4–3	8–12
San Francisco	9–10	3–4	5–2	2–4	14–5	4–15	4–3	4–3	3–4	5–1	5–1	6–13	—	3–4	4–2	10–10
St. Louis	5–2	3–4	13–6	12–7	4–2	2–4	4–2	10–9	2–5	3–4	13–6	4–2	4–3	—	4–3	10–10
Washington	3–4	5–14	2–4	4–3	4–3	3–3	4–15	3–3	5–14	3–16	3–4	3–4	2–4	3–4	—	8–12

Updated with the results of all games through October 5, 2022.

=== Game log ===
2022 Game Log: 62–100 (Home: 34–47; Away: 28–53)
April: 9–12 (Home: 5–6; Away: 4–6)

#	Date	Opponent	Score	Win	Loss	Save	Attendance	Record	Streak
1	April 7	@ Cardinals	0–9	Wainwright (1–0)	**Brubaker** (0–1)	—	46,256	0–1	L1
2	April 9	@ Cardinals	2–6	Whitley (1–0)	**Keller** (0–1)	—	45,025	0–2	L2
3	April 10	@ Cardinals	9–4	**Yajure** (1–0)	Matz (0–1)	—	40,027	1–2	W1
—	April 11	@ Cardinals	Postponed (rain); Makeup: June 14						
4	April 12	Cubs	1–2	Smyly (1–0)	**Quintana** (0–1)	Robertson (2)	34,458	1–3	L1
5	April 13	Cubs	6–2	**Peters** (1–0)	Hendricks (0–1)	**Crowe** (1)	9,122	2–3	W1
6	April 14	Nationals	9–4	**Contreras** (1–0)	Adon (0–2)	—	9,266	3–3	W2
7	April 15	Nationals	2–7	Fedde (1–0)	**Keller** (0–2)	—	13,076	3–4	L1
8	April 16	Nationals	6–4	**Peters** (2–0)	Rogers (1–1)	—	8,676	4–4	W1
9	April 17	Nationals	5–3	**Hembree** (1–0)	Cishek (0–1)	**Bednar** (1)	8,735	5–4	W2
10	April 18	@ Brewers	1–6	Lauer (1–0)	**Thompson** (0–1)	—	21,512	5–5	L1
11	April 19	@ Brewers	2–5	Burnes (1–0)	**Brubaker** (0–2)	Hader (5)	22,747	5–6	L2
12	April 20	@ Brewers	2–4	Woodruff (2–1)	**Keller** (0–3)	Hader (6)	20,790	5–7	L3
13	April 21	@ Cubs	4–3	**Crowe** (1–0)	Roberts (0–1)	**Stratton** (1)	32,341	6–7	W1
14	April 22	@ Cubs	4–2	**De Jong** (1–0)	Smyly (1–1)	**Stratton** (2)	25,005	7–7	W2
15	April 23	@ Cubs	0–21	Hendricks (1–1)	**Thompson** (0–2)	—	39,917	7–8	L1
16	April 24	@ Cubs	4–3	**Peters** (3–0)	Steele (1–2)	**Bednar** (2)	28,387	8–8	W1
17	April 26	Brewers	8–12	Suter (1–0)	**Fletcher** (0–1)	Hader (9)	8,493	8–9	L1
18	April 27	Brewers	1–3	Gott (1–0)	**Crowe** (1–1)	Hader (10)	8,331	8–10	L2
19	April 28	Brewers	2–3	Milner (2–0)	**Stratton** (0–1)	Williams (1)	8,332	8–11	L3
20	April 29	Padres	3–7	Darvish (2–1)	**Thompson** (0–3)	—	9,755	8–12	L4
21	April 30	Padres	7–6 (10)	**Stratton** (1–1)	García (0–1)	—	20,483	9–12	W1

May: 12–15 (Home: 6–8; Away: 6–7)

#	Date	Opponent	Score	Win	Loss	Save	Attendance	Record	Streak
22	May 1	Padres	2–5	Musgrove (4–0)	**Keller** (0–4)	Rogers (9)	8,350	9–13	L1
—	May 3	@ Tigers	Postponed (rain); Makeup: May 4						
23	May 4 (1)	@ Tigers	2–3	Lange (1–1)	**Wilson** (0–1)	Soto (4)	see 2nd game	9–14	L2
24	May 4 (2)	@ Tigers	7–2	**Thompson** (1–3)	Hutchison (0–2)	**Bednar** (2)	15,150	10–14	W1
—	May 6	@ Reds	Postponed (rain); Makeup: July 7						
25	May 7 (1)	@ Reds	2–9	Sims (1–0)	**Crowe** (1–2)	—	9,267	10–15	L1
26	May 7 (2)	@ Reds	8–5	**Hembree** (2–0)	Diehl (0–1)	**Bednar** (3)	21,448	11–15	W1
27	May 8	@ Reds	3–7	Warren (1–1)	**Peters** (3–1)	—	17,623	11–16	L1
28	May 9	Dodgers	5–1	**Quintana** (1–1)	Urías (2–2)	—	8,527	12–16	W1
29	May 10	Dodgers	1–11	Gonsolin (3–0)	**Wilson** (0–2)	—	11,583	12–17	L1
30	May 11	Dodgers	5–3	**Crowe** (2–2)	Hudson (1–2)	**Bednar** (5)	11,105	13–17	W1
31	May 12	Reds	0–4	Overton (1–0)	**Brubaker** (0–3)	—	9,470	13–18	L1
32	May 13	Reds	2–8	Mahle (2–4)	**Keller** (0–5)	—	12,588	13–19	L2
33	May 14	Reds	3–1	**Thompson** (2–3)	Castillo (0–1)	**Bednar** (6)	12,959	14–19	W1
34	May 15	Reds	1–0	**Stratton** (2–1)	Greene (1–6)	**Bednar** (7)	10,559	15–19	W2
35	May 16	@ Cubs	0–9	Miley (1–0)	**Peters** (3–2)	—	31,119	15–20	L1
36	May 17	@ Cubs	0–7	Thompson (3–0)	**Brubaker** (0–4)	—	30,478	15–21	L2
37	May 18	@ Cubs	3–2	**Keller** (1–5)	Smyly (1–5)	**Bednar** (8)	31,631	16–21	W1
38	May 20	Cardinals	3–5	Wainwright (5–3)	**Thompson** (2–4)	Gallegos (8)	14,034	16–22	L1
39	May 21	Cardinals	4–5	VerHagen (1–0)	**Quintana** (1–2)	Helsley (2)	24,644	16–23	L2
40	May 22	Cardinals	4–18	Rondón (1–0)	**Wilson** (0–3)	—	13,510	16–24	L3
41	May 23	Rockies	2–1	**Bednar** (1–0)	Kinley (1–1)	—	8,376	17–24	W1
42	May 24	Rockies	1–2 (10)	Bard (2–2)	**Bednar** (1–1)	—	9,009	17–25	L1
43	May 25	Rockies	10–5	**Peters** (4–2)	Lawrence (1–1)	—	10,014	18–25	W1
44	May 27	@ Padres	3–4	Crismatt (3–0)	**Underwood Jr.** (0–1)	Rogers (17)	41,888	18–26	L1
45	May 28	@ Padres	4–2	**Banda** (1–0)	Rogers (0–1)	**Bednar** (9)	38,189	19–26	W1
46	May 29	@ Padres	2–4 (10)	García (4–2)	**Stratton** (2–2)	—	44,395	19–27	L1
47	May 30	@ Dodgers	6–5	**Bednar** (2–1)	Kimbrel (0–1)	—	46,724	20–27	W1
48	May 31	@ Dodgers	5–3	**Keller** (2–5)	Urías (3–5)	**Crowe** (2)	52,686	21–27	W2

June: 10–18 (Home: 7–6; Away: 3–12)

#	Date	Opponent	Score	Win	Loss	Save	Attendance	Record	Streak
49	June 1	@ Dodgers	8–4	**De Jong** (2–0)	White (1–1)	—	39,324	22–27	W3
50	June 3	Diamondbacks	6–8	Kelly (4–3)	**Brubaker** (0–5)	Melancon (11)	16,444	22–28	L1
51	June 4	Diamondbacks	2–1	**Stratton** (3–2)	Melancon (1–6)	—	19,149	23–28	W1
52	June 5	Diamondbacks	3–0	**Thompson** (3–4)	Gallen (4–1)	**Bednar** (10)	11,796	24–28	W2
53	June 7	Tigers	3–5	Skubal (5–2)	**Quintana** (1–3)	Soto (11)	10,214	24–29	L1
54	June 8	Tigers	1–3	Vest (1–1)	**Crowe** (2–3)	Soto (12)	11,723	24–30	L2
55	June 9	@ Braves	1–3	Fried (6–2)	**Brubaker** (0–6)	Jansen (16)	39,336	24–31	L3
56	June 10	@ Braves	2–4	Strider (2–2)	**Contreras** (1–1)	Jansen (17)	41,404	24–32	L4
57	June 11	@ Braves	4–10	Chavez (1–1)	**Underwood Jr.** (0–2)	—	41,219	24–33	L5
58	June 12	@ Braves	3–5	Wright (7–3)	**Quintana** (1–4)	Jansen (18)	35,446	24–34	L6
59	June 13	@ Cardinals	5–7	Gallegos (2–2)	**Stratton** (3–3)	Helsley (5)	37,398	24–35	L7
60	June 14 (1)	@ Cardinals	1–3	Liberatore (2–1)	**Brubaker** (0–7)	Gallegos (9)	31,193	24–36	L8
61	June 14 (2)	@ Cardinals	1–9	Mikolas (5–4)	**Wilson** (0–4)	—	33,977	24–37	L9
62	June 15	@ Cardinals	6–4	**Crowe** (3–3)	Pallante (2–1)	**Bednar** (11)	38,658	25–37	W1
63	June 17	Giants	0–2	Rodón (6–4)	**Thompson** (3–5)	Doval (10)	19,075	25–38	L1
64	June 18	Giants	5–7	Wood (5–5)	**Crowe** (3–4)	Doval (11)	26,041	25–39	L2
65	June 19	Giants	4–3	**Bednar** (3–1)	Rogers (0–3)	—	23,905	26–39	W1
66	June 20	Cubs	12–1	**Brubaker** (1–7)	Kilian (0–2)	—	11,312	27–39	W2
67	June 21	Cubs	7–1	**Contreras** (2–1)	Swarmer (1–3)	—	11,254	28–39	W3
68	June 22	Cubs	5–14	Thompson (7–2)	**Eickhoff** (0–1)	—	14,083	28–40	L1
69	June 23	Cubs	8–7 (10)	**Stratton** (4–3)	Effross (1–3)	—	14,529	29–40	W1
70	June 24	@ Rays	3–4 (10)	Adam (1–2)	**De Los Santos** (0–1)	—	10,542	29–41	L1
71	June 25	@ Rays	5–6	Garza Jr. (1–2)	**Bednar** (3–2)	—	15,203	29–42	L2
72	June 26	@ Rays	2–4	McClanahan (8–3)	**Beede** (0–1)	Raley (4)	13,364	29–43	L3
73	June 27	@ Nationals	2–3	Edwards Jr. (2–1)	**Stratton** (4–4)	Finnegan (1)	18,213	29–44	L4
74	June 28	@ Nationals	1–3	Corbin (4–10)	**Crowe** (3–5)	Rainey (11)	22,575	29–45	L5
75	June 29	@ Nationals	8–7	**De Jong** (3–0)	Edwards Jr. (2–2)	**De Los Santos** (1)	19,870	30–45	W1
76	June 30	Brewers	8–7	**Brubaker** (2–7)	Suter (1–2)	**De Los Santos** (2)	14,134	31–45	W2

July: 9–17 (Home: 3–9; Away: 6–8)

#	Date	Opponent	Score	Win	Loss	Save	Attendance	Record	Streak
77	July 1	Brewers	2–19	Burnes (7–4)	**Contreras** (2–2)	—	20,409	31–46	L1
78	July 2	Brewers	7–4	**Wilson** (1–4)	Ashby (1–6)	**Bednar** (12)	26,505	32–46	W1
79	July 3	Brewers	0–2	Woodruff (7–3)	**Thompson** (3–6)	Hader (25)	17,578	32–47	L1
80	July 5	Yankees	5–2	**Quintana** (2–4)	Taillon (9–2)	**Bednar** (13)	37,733	33–47	W1
81	July 6	Yankees	0–16	Severino (5–3)	**Keller** (2–6)	—	32,414	33–48	L1
82	July 7 (1)	@ Reds	4–2	**Contreras** (3–2)	Minor (1–6)	**Bednar** (14)	13,086	34–48	W1
83	July 7 (2)	@ Reds	1–5	Sanmartin (1–4)	**Wilson** (1–5)	—	9,575	34–49	L1
84	July 8	@ Brewers	3–4	Ashby (2–6)	**Brubaker** (2–8)	Hader (26)	29,471	34–50	L2
85	July 9	@ Brewers	4–3	**De Jong** (4–0)	Boxberger (3–2)	**Bednar** (15)	35,384	35–50	W1
86	July 10	@ Brewers	8–6	**Stratton** (5–4)	Gott (1–2)	—	32,967	36–50	W2
87	July 11	@ Marlins	5–1	**Keller** (3–6)	Rogers (4–8)	**De Los Santos** (3)	8,560	37–50	W3
88	July 12	@ Marlins	3–2	**Peters** (5–2)	Castano (1–3)	**Bednar** (16)	8,022	38–50	W4
89	July 13	@ Marlins	4–5 (10)	Pop (1–0)	**Bednar** (3–3)	—	9,524	38–51	L1
90	July 14	@ Marlins	2–3 (11)	Bleier (2–1)	**Crowe** (3–6)	—	13,612	38–52	L2
91	July 15	@ Rockies	2–13	Márquez (6–7)	**Quintana** (2–5)	—	33,710	38–53	L3
92	July 16	@ Rockies	0–2	Ureña (1–1)	**Keller** (3–7)	Bard (20)	34,169	38–54	L4
93	July 17	@ Rockies	8–3	**Beede** (1–1)	Bird (1–1)	—	27,591	39–54	W1
**92nd All-Star Game in Los Angeles, CA**
94	July 22	Marlins	1–8	Garrett (2–3)	**Thompson** (3–7)	—	22,316	39–55	L1
95	July 23	Marlins	1–0	**Quintana** (3–5)	Scott (4–4)	**Bednar** (17)	22,560	40–55	W1
96	July 24	Marlins	5–6 (10)	Bass (2–3)	**Bednar** (3–4)	Brigham (1)	15,188	40–56	L1
97	July 25	@ Cubs	2–3	Givens (6–2)	**De Los Santos** (0–2)	Effross (1)	37,342	40–57	L2
98	July 26	@ Cubs	2–4	Thompson (8–4)	**Wilson** (1–6)	Givens (2)	30,978	40–58	L3
99	July 28	Phillies	7–8	Wheeler (9–5)	**Thompson** (3–8)	Domínguez (6)	20,701	40–59	L4
100	July 29	Phillies	2–4 (10)	Domínguez (5–3)	**Underwood Jr.** (0–3)	Brogdon (1)	26,946	40–60	L5
101	July 30	Phillies	1–2 (10)	Knebel (3–5)	**De Los Santos** (0–3)	—	38,781	40–61	L6
102	July 31	Phillies	2–8	Nola (7–8)	**Brubaker** (2–9)	—	19,322	40–62	L7

August: 9–19 (Home: 5–7; Away: 4–12)

#	Date	Opponent	Score	Win	Loss	Save	Attendance	Record	Streak
103	August 2	Brewers	5–3	**Holderman** (5–0)	Burnes (8–5)	**Crowe** (3)	12,401	41–62	W1
104	August 3	Brewers	8–7	**Crowe** (4–6)	Williams (2–1)	—	13,084	42–62	W2
105	August 4	Brewers	5–4 (10)	**Underwood Jr.** (1–3)	Bush (2–2)	—	13,485	43–62	W3
106	August 5	@ Orioles	0–1	Kremer (4–3)	**Keller** (3–8)	Bautista (7)	25,613	43–63	L1
107	August 6	@ Orioles	3–6	Voth (2–1)	**Brubaker** (2–10)	—	41,086	43–64	L2
108	August 7	@ Orioles	8–1	**Wilson** (2–6)	Watkins (4–2)	—	16,714	44–64	W1
109	August 8	@ Diamondbacks	0–3	Gallen (7–2)	**Bañuelos** (0–1)	Kennedy (7)	11,275	44–65	L1
110	August 9	@ Diamondbacks	4–6	Henry (1–1)	**Thompson** (3–9)	Melancon (16)	12,901	44–66	L2
111	August 10	@ Diamondbacks	6–4	**Keller** (4–8)	Bumgarner (6–11)	**Stout** (1)	12,714	45–66	W1
112	August 11	@ Diamondbacks	3–9	Ginkel (1–0)	**De Jong** (4–1)	—	12,725	45–67	L1
113	August 12	@ Giants	3–5	Rodón (11–6)	**Wilson** (2–7)	Doval (16)	33,328	45–68	L2
114	August 13	@ Giants	0–2	Webb (11–5)	**Beede** (1–2)	Doval (17)	38,049	45–69	L3
115	August 14	@ Giants	7–8	Doval (4–5)	**Crowe** (4–7)	—	36,471	45–70	L4
116	August 16	Red Sox	3–5	Pivetta (9–9)	**Keller** (4–9)	Barnes (3)	19,387	45–71	L5
117	August 17	Red Sox	3–8	Hill (5–5)	**Contreras** (3–3)	—	15,231	45–72	L6
118	August 18	Red Sox	8–2	**Brubaker** (3–10)	Winckowski (5–6)	—	20,991	46–72	W1
119	August 19	Reds	5–4	**Crowe** (5–7)	Kuhnel (2–2)	—	17,706	47–72	W2
120	August 20	Reds	1–10	Dunn (1–1)	**Beede** (1–3)	—	31,761	47–73	L1
121	August 21	Reds	5–9	Minor (2–10)	**Thompson** (3–10)	—	15,046	47–74	L2
122	August 22	Braves	1–2	Odorizzi (5–5)	**Contreras** (3–4)	Jansen (29)	11,231	47–75	L3
123	August 23	Braves	1–6	Fried (12–4)	**Brubaker** (3–11)	—	13,367	47–76	L4
124	August 24	Braves	2–14	Wright (16–5)	**Keller** (4–10)	—	12,060	47–77	L5
125	August 26	@ Phillies	4–7	Falter (2–3)	**Wilson** (2–8)	Hand (5)	30,546	47–78	L6
126	August 27	@ Phillies	0–6	Gibson (9–5)	**Beede** (1–4)	—	37,105	47–79	L7
127	August 28	@ Phillies	5–0	**Contreras** (4–4)	Syndergaard (8–9)	—	30,355	48–79	W1
128	August 29	@ Brewers	5–7	Williams (5–3)	**Crowe** (5–8)	—	23,009	48–80	L1
129	August 30	@ Brewers	4–2	**Bañuelos** (1–1)	Boxberger (3–3)	**De Jong** (1)	24,764	49–80	W1
130	August 31	@ Brewers	1–6	Rogers (3–6)	**Yajure** (1–1)	—	25,240	49–81	L1

September: 10–17 (Home: 6–10; Away: 4–7)

#	Date	Opponent	Score	Win	Loss	Save	Attendance	Record	Streak
131	September 2	Blue Jays	0–4	Manoah (13–7)	**Beede** (1–5)	—	18,057	49–82	L2
132	September 3	Blue Jays	1–4	García (4–4)	**Underwood Jr.** (1–4)	Romano (29)	23,568	49–83	L3
133	September 4	Blue Jays	3–4	Stripling (7–4)	**Underwood Jr.** (1–5)	Romano (30)	14,903	49–84	L4
—	September 5	Mets	Postponed (rain); Makeup: September 7						
134	September 6	Mets	8–2	**Keller** (5–10)	Walker (10–4)	—	8,817	50–84	W1
135	September 7 (1)	Mets	1–5	Bassitt (13–7)	**Underwood Jr.** (1–6)	—	8,717	50–85	L1
136	September 7 (2)	Mets	0–10	deGrom (5–1)	**Oviedo** (2–2)	—	9,824	50–86	L2
137	September 9	Cardinals	8–2	**Contreras** (5–4)	Mikolas (11–11)	—	15,718	51–86	W1
138	September 10	Cardinals	4–7	Gallegos (3–5)	**Crowe** (5–9)	Helsley (15)	22,042	51–87	L1
139	September 11	Cardinals	3–4	Stratton (8–4)	**De Jong** (4–2)	Helsley (16)	10,398	51–88	L2
140	September 12	@ Reds	6–3	**Wilson** (3–8)	Minor (4–11)	**Crowe** (4)	12,083	52–88	W1
141	September 13 (1)	@ Reds	6–1	**Oviedo** (3–2)	Cessa (3–3)	—	9,338	53–88	W2
142	September 13 (2)	@ Reds	1–0	**De Jong** (5–2)	Espinal (0–1)	**Underwood Jr.** (1)	13,156	54–88	W3
143	September 14	@ Reds	10–4	**Beede** (2–5)	Lodolo (4–6)	**Yajure** (1)	11,449	55–88	W4
144	September 15	@ Mets	1–7	Carrasco (15–6)	**Brubaker** (3–12)	—	25,683	55–89	L1
145	September 16	@ Mets	3–4	Walker (12–4)	**Keller** (5–11)	Díaz (30)	28,928	55–90	L2
146	September 17	@ Mets	1–5	Bassitt (14–8)	**Wilson** (3–9)	—	40,111	55–91	L3
147	September 18	@ Mets	3–7	Rodríguez (1–4)	**Stephenson** (2–2)	—	36,291	55–92	L4
148	September 20	@ Yankees	8–9	Chapman (3–3)	**Crowe** (5–10)	—	40,157	55–93	L5
149	September 21	@ Yankees	2–14	Severino (6–3)	**Contreras** (5–5)	—	46,175	55–94	L6
150	September 22	Cubs	2–3	Wesneski (2–1)	**Keller** (5–12)	Leiter Jr. (3)	9,166	55–95	L7
151	September 23	Cubs	5–6	Rodríguez (2–0)	**Ramírez** (1–1)	Uelmen (1)	11,987	55–96	L8
152	September 24	Cubs	6–0	**Oviedo** (4–2)	Miley (1–2)	—	17,273	56–96	W1
153	September 25	Cubs	3–8	Sampson (3–5)	**Ortiz** (0–1)	Hughes (7)	16,192	56–97	L1
154	September 26	Reds	8–3	**Ramírez** (2–1)	Law (2–2)	—	8,766	57–97	W1
155	September 27	Reds	4–1	**Crowe** (6–10)	Farmer (2–2)	**Bednar** (18)	8,723	58–97	W2
156	September 28	Reds	4–3 (10)	**Ramírez** (3–1)	Díaz (6–3)	—	9,127	59–97	W3
157	September 30	@ Cardinals	1–2	Flaherty (2–1)	**Oviedo** (4–3)	Helsley (19)	47,032	59–98	L1

October: 3–2 (Home: 2–1; Away: 1–1)

#	Date	Opponent	Score	Win	Loss	Save	Attendance	Record	Streak
158	October 1	@ Cardinals	3–13	Montgomery (9–6)	**Ortiz** (0–2)	—	46,365	59–99	L2
159	October 2	@ Cardinals	7–5	**De Jong** (6–2)	Wainwright (11–12)	**Bednar** (19)	46,680	60–99	W1
160	October 3	Cardinals	3–2	**Ramírez** (4–1)	Gallegos (3–6)	—	12,702	61–99	W2
161	October 4	Cardinals	7–8 (10)	Stratton (10–4)	**De Jong** (6–3)	—	12,842	61–100	L1
162	October 5	Cardinals	5–3	**Bañuelos** (2–1)	Liberatore (2–2)	**Ramírez** (1)	15,319	62–100	W1

Legend: = Win = Loss = Postponement
Bold = Pirates team member

== Roster ==
2022 Pittsburgh Pirates
Roster
Pitchers: 63 Cam Alldred; 52 Anthony Banda; 53 Manny Bañuelos; 51 David Bednar; 48 Tyler Beede; 70,72 Austin Brice; 34 J. T. Brubaker; 59 Roansy Contreras; 29 Wil Crowe; 37 Chase De Jong; 57 Yerry De Los Santos; 43 Jerad Eickhoff; 43 Junior Fernández; 35 Aaron Fletcher; 53 Heath Hembree; 35 Colin Holderman; 54 Sam Howard; 23 Mitch Keller; 45 Max Kranick; 36 Nick Mears; 75 Luis Ortiz; 62 Johan Oviedo; 38 Dillon Peters; 62 José Quintana; 46 Yohan Ramírez; 41 Robert Stephenson; 52 Eric Stout; 46 Chris Stratton; 69 Beau Sulser; 39 Zach Thompson; 56 Duane Underwood Jr.; 68 Cam Vieaux; 32 Bryse Wilson; 89 Miguel Yajure	Catchers: 61,66 Jason Delay; 70 José Godoy; 54 Tyler Heineman; 31 Andrew Knapp; 5 Michael Pérez; 55 Roberto Pérez; Infielders: 64 Diego Castillo; 14 Rodolfo Castro; 6 Yu Chang; 2 Michael Chavis; 6 Zack Collins; 15 Oneil Cruz; 13 Ke'Bryan Hayes; 27 Kevin Newman; 5 Kevin Padlo; 44 Hoy Park; 60 Liover Peguero; 25 Yoshi Tsutsugo; 26 Josh VanMeter; 19 Daniel Vogelbach	Outfielders: 6 Anthony Alford; 24 Greg Allen; 26 Miguel Andújar; 71 Ji-hwan Bae; 18 Ben Gamel; 66 Bligh Madris; 30 Tucupita Marcano; 41 Jake Marisnick; 31 Cal Mitchell; 10 Bryan Reynolds; 28 Canaan Smith-Njigba; 65 Jack Suwinski; 50 Travis Swaggerty; 3 Cole Tucker	Manager: 17 Derek Shelton; Coaches: 16 Tarrik Brock (first base); 82 Jordan Comadena (bullpen catcher); 86 Radley Haddad (game planning/strategy); 49 Andy Haines (hitting); 12 Don Kelly (bench); 47 Oscar Marin (pitching); 88 Christian Marrero (assistant hitting); 87 Justin Meccage (bullpen); 58 Mike Rabelo (third base)

== Statistics ==
=== Batting ===
(through October 5, 2022)
Players in bold are on the active roster.
Note: G = Games played; AB = At bats; R = Runs; H = Hits; 2B = Doubles; 3B = Triples; HR = Home runs; RBI = Runs batted in; SB = Stolen bases; BB = Walks; K = Strikeouts; AVG = Batting average; OBP = On-base percentage; SLG = Slugging percentage; TB = Total bases

Player	G	AB	R	H	2B	3B	HR	RBI	SB	BB	K	AVG	OBP	SLG	TB
Anthony Alford	2	4	0	1	0	0	0	0	0	0	2	.250	.250	.250	1
**Greg Allen**	46	118	17	22	4	0	2	8	8	10	42	.186	.260	.271	32
**Miguel Andújar**	9	36	4	9	3	1	0	9	0	2	5	.250	.275	.389	14
**Ji-hwan Bae**	10	33	5	11	3	0	0	6	3	2	6	.333	.405	.424	14
**Diego Castillo**	96	262	28	54	13	0	11	29	1	14	75	.206	.251	.382	100
**Rodolfo Castro**	71	253	25	59	8	4	11	27	5	22	74	.233	.299	.427	108
Yu Chang	18	42	5	7	1	0	1	2	0	4	18	.167	.286	.262	11
**Michael Chavis**	129	401	39	92	16	3	14	49	1	19	126	.229	.265	.389	156
**Zack Collins**	10	25	2	1	0	0	0	1	0	3	10	.040	.138	.040	1
**Oneil Cruz**	87	331	45	77	13	4	17	54	10	28	126	.233	.294	.450	149
**Jason Delay**	57	155	17	33	6	0	1	11	0	9	50	.213	.265	.271	42
**Ben Gamel**	115	371	42	86	20	2	9	46	5	48	98	.232	.324	.369	137
José Godoy	8	17	1	1	0	0	0	1	0	0	7	.059	.059	.059	1
**Ke'Bryan Hayes**	136	505	55	123	24	3	7	41	20	48	122	.244	.314	.345	174
**Tyler Heineman**	52	142	14	30	6	0	0	8	1	8	13	.211	.277	.254	36
Andrew Knapp	11	31	2	4	1	0	0	2	0	3	9	.129	.229	.161	5
Bligh Madris	39	113	10	20	7	0	1	7	2	10	31	.177	.244	.265	30
Tucupita Marcano	49	160	18	33	6	2	2	13	2	10	44	.206	.256	.306	49
Jake Marisnick	31	77	9	18	6	0	2	6	2	4	24	.234	.272	.390	30
**Cal Mitchell**	69	212	21	48	11	0	5	17	3	18	52	.226	.286	.349	74
**Kevin Newman**	78	288	31	79	18	2	2	24	8	16	48	.274	.316	.372	107
Kevin Padlo	3	11	0	0	0	0	0	0	0	0	1	.000	.000	.000	0
Hoy Park	23	51	7	11	2	0	2	6	1	4	15	.216	.276	.373	19
Liover Peguero	1	3	0	1	0	0	0	0	0	1	2	.333	.500	.333	1
Michael Pérez	39	107	8	16	0	0	6	11	1	8	26	.150	.209	.318	34
Roberto Pérez	21	60	8	14	2	0	2	8	0	9	25	.233	.333	.367	22
**Bryan Reynolds**	145	542	74	142	19	4	27	62	7	56	141	.262	.345	.461	250
Canaan Smith-Njigba	3	5	1	1	1	0	0	0	0	1	0	.200	.429	.400	2
**Jack Suwinski**	106	326	45	66	11	0	19	38	4	41	114	.202	.298	.411	134
Travis Swaggerty	5	9	0	1	0	0	0	0	0	0	4	.111	.111	.111	1
Yoshi Tsutsugo	50	170	11	29	4	0	2	19	0	19	50	.171	.249	.229	39
Cole Tucker	18	63	3	11	1	1	0	2	1	0	25	.175	.175	.222	14
Josh VanMeter	67	171	15	32	5	2	3	14	4	19	45	.187	.266	.292	50
Daniel Vogelbach	75	237	29	54	10	1	12	34	0	40	67	.228	.338	.430	102
**TEAM TOTALS**	162	5331	591	1186	221	29	158	555	89	476	1497	.222	.291	.364	1939

=== Pitching ===
(through October 5, 2022)
Players in bold are on the active roster.
Note: W = Wins; L = Losses; ERA = Earned run average; WHIP = Walks plus hits per inning pitched; G = Games pitched; GS = Games started; SV = Saves; IP = Innings pitched; H = Hits allowed; R = Runs allowed; ER = Earned runs allowed; BB = Walks allowed; K = Strikeouts

Player	W	L	ERA	WHIP	G	GS	SV	IP	H	R	ER	BB	K
Cam Alldred	0	0	0.00	1.00	1	0	0	1.0	1	0	0	0	1
**Anthony Banda**	1	0	6.41	1.98	23	0	0	19.2	34	14	14	5	22
Manny Bañuelos	2	1	4.96	1.32	31	0	0	32.2	25	21	18	18	34
**David Bednar**	3	4	2.61	1.12	45	0	19	51.2	42	19	15	16	69
**Tyler Beede**	2	5	5.23	1.55	25	5	0	51.2	57	32	30	23	35
Austin Brice	0	0	4.05	1.05	4	0	0	6.2	4	3	3	3	5
**J. T. Brubaker**	3	12	4.69	1.47	28	28	0	144.0	157	85	75	54	147
**Diego Castillo**	0	0	36.00	4.50	0	0	2.0	6	8	8	3	1	
**Roansy Contreras**	5	5	3.79	1.27	21	18	0	95.0	82	45	40	39	86
**Wil Crowe**	6	10	4.38	1.40	60	1	4	76.0	68	40	37	38	68
**Chase De Jong**	6	3	2.64	1.14	42	0	1	71.2	52	24	21	30	59
**Yerry De Los Santos**	0	3	4.91	1.29	26	0	3	25.2	22	18	14	11	26
Jerad Eickhoff	0	1	20.77	2.54	1	1	0	4.1	10	10	10	1	4
Junior Fernández	0	0	0.00	1.50	3	0	0	3.1	1	0	0	4	2
Aaron Fletcher	0	1	6.94	1.20	9	0	0	11.2	10	9	9	4	6
Heath Hembree	2	0	7.16	1.90	20	0	0	16.1	17	13	13	14	12
**Colin Holderman**	1	0	6.75	1.50	9	0	0	10.2	9	8	8	7	6
Sam Howard	0	0	9.00	3.00	3	0	0	2.0	2	2	2	4	1
**Mitch Keller**	5	12	3.91	1.40	31	29	0	159.0	162	77	69	60	138
Max Kranick	0	0	0.00	1.20	2	0	0	5.0	3	0	0	3	4
Nick Mears	0	0	0.00	1.00	2	0	0	2.0	1	0	0	1	2
Luis Ortiz	0	2	4.50	1.13	4	4	0	16.0	8	9	8	10	17
**Johan Oviedo**	2	2	3.23	1.27	7	7	0	30.2	23	12	11	16	28
**Dillon Peters**	5	2	4.58	1.32	22	4	0	39.1	35	20	20	17	26
**José Quintana**	3	5	3.50	1.27	20	20	0	103.0	100	43	40	31	89
**Yohan Ramírez**	3	1	3.67	1.30	22	0	1	27.0	22	11	11	13	21
**Robert Stephenson**	0	1	3.38	0.83	13	0	0	13.1	10	5	5	1	18
Eric Stout	0	0	5.79	1.98	18	0	1	18.2	22	13	12	15	19
**Chris Stratton**	5	4	5.09	1.55	40	1	2	40.2	50	26	23	13	37
Beau Sulser	0	0	3.72	1.45	4	0	0	9.2	8	9	4	6	10
**Zach Thompson**	3	10	5.18	1.51	29	22	0	121.1	138	76	70	46	90
**Duane Underwood Jr.**	1	6	4.40	1.45	51	1	1	57.1	58	35	28	25	57
**Josh VanMeter**	0	0	39.00	5.67	3	0	0	3.0	15	13	13	2	0
Cam Vieaux	0	0	10.38	2.31	8	0	0	8.2	15	11	10	5	15
Bryse Wilson	3	9	5.52	1.42	25	20	0	115.2	132	80	71	32	79
Miguel Yajure	1	1	8.88	1.93	12	1	1	24.1	31	26	24	16	16
**TEAM TOTALS**	62	100	4.66	1.42	162	162	33	1421.0	1432	817	735	586	1250

== Farm system ==
Level	Team	League	Manager
Triple-A	Indianapolis Indians	International League	Miguel Pérez
Double-A	Altoona Curve	Eastern League	Kieran Mattison
High-A	Greensboro Grasshoppers	South Atlantic League	Callix Crabbe
Low-A	Bradenton Marauders	Florida State League	Jonathan Johnston
Rookie	FCL Pirates	Florida Complex League	Jose Mosquera
Rookie	DSL Pirates Black	Dominican Summer League	Ethan Goforth
Rookie	DSL Pirates Gold	Dominican Summer League	Jose Mendez
