= Eddy Yean =

Dominican baseball player (born 2001)

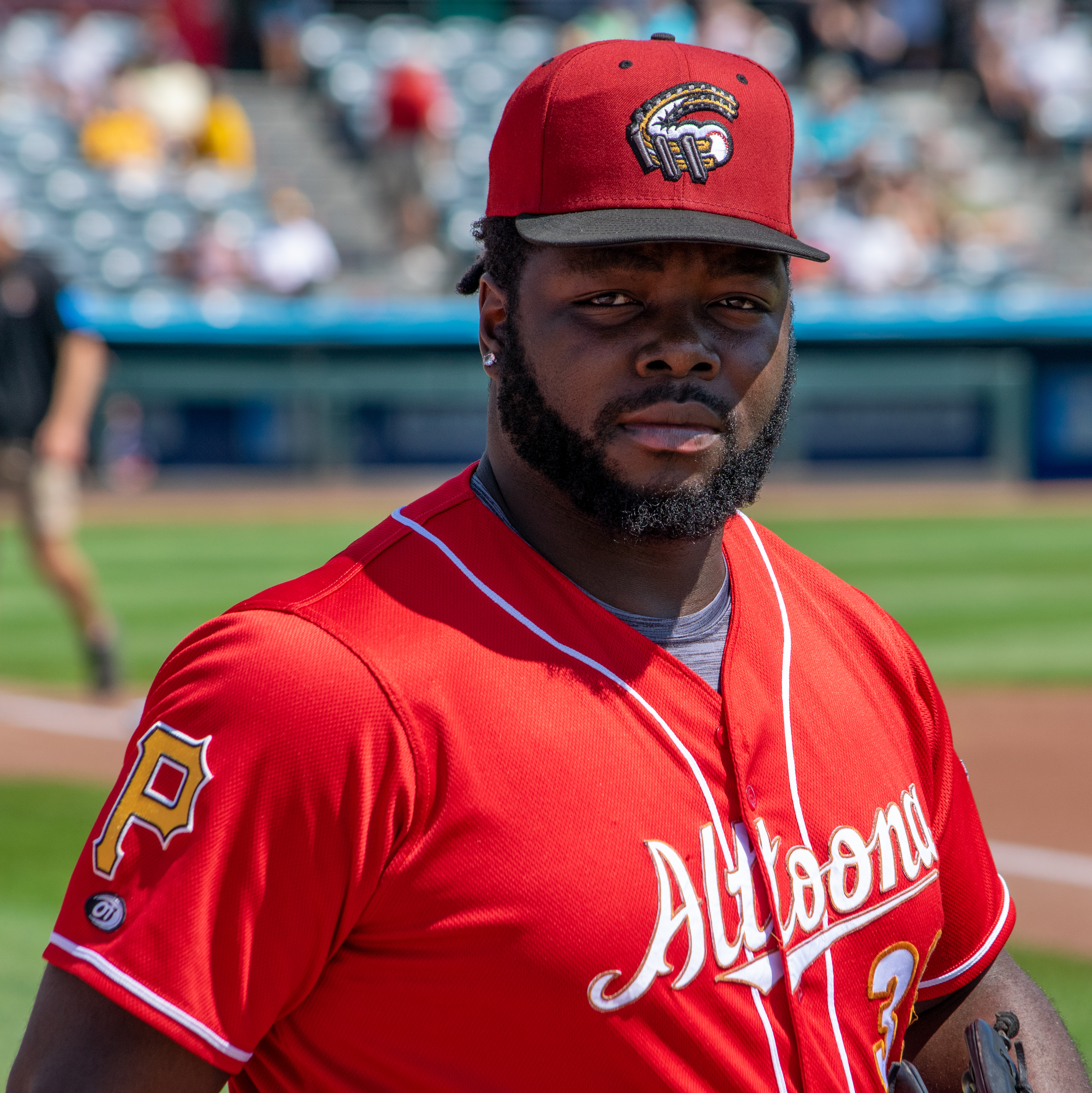
- Yean with the Altoona Curve in 2024

Washington Nationals – No. 46
- Pitcher
- Born: June 25, 2001 (age 25); Sabana Grande de Boyá, Dominican Republic
- Bats: Right Throws: Right

MLB debut
- July 5, 2026, for the Washington Nationals

MLB statistics (through 2026 season)
- Win–loss record: 0–1
- Earned run average: 2.45
- Strikeouts: 7
- Stats at Baseball Reference

Teams
- Washington Nationals (2026–present)

Eddy Yean (born June 25, 2001) is a Dominican professional baseball pitcher for the Washington Nationals of Major League Baseball (MLB). He debuted in MLB in 2026.

== Career ==
=== Washington Nationals ===
The Washington Nationals signed Yean as an international amateur free agent out of the Dominican Republic on July 2, 2017, giving him a $100,000 signing bonus. After beginning his professional career in the Dominican Summer League in 2018, Yean advanced to Low-A in 2019, pitching for the Auburn Doubledays. In 2020, MLB Pipeline rated Yean as the Nationals' sixth-best prospect overall and forecast that he would continue rising as a prospect. He did not play in a game in 2020 due to the cancellation of the minor league season because of the COVID-19 pandemic.

Yean pitches right-handed, releasing the ball from a three-quarters arm slot. He employs a two-seam fastball up to 97 miles per hour (156 km/h) as his primary pitch. He also throws a slider and a changeup.

=== Pittsburgh Pirates ===
On December 24, 2020, Yean along with Wil Crowe were traded to the Pittsburgh Pirates in exchange for Josh Bell. He returned to action in 2021 with the Single-A Bradenton Marauders, pitching to a 5-2 record and 5.27 ERA with 69 strikeouts over 22 appearances (eight starts).

Yean made 42 appearances for the High-A Greensboro Grasshoppers in 2022, but struggled to a 3-4 record and 6.75 ERA with 60 strikeouts and three save across 53 1/3 innings pitched. He returned to Greensboro for the 2023 season, accumulating a 2-3 record and 5.01 ERA with 44 strikeouts and four saves across 40 appearances (one start).

Yean split the 2024 campaign between the Double-A Altoona Curve and Triple-A Indianapolis Indians. He made 48 appearances out of the bullpen for the two affiliates, accumulating a 7-5 record and 3.36 ERA with 69 strikeouts and five saves over 75 innings of work. Yean returned to Indianapolis in 2025, compiling an 8-5 record and 3.06 ERA with 54 strikeouts and seven saves in 70 2/3 innings pitched across 50 appearances (four starts). He elected free agency following the season on November 6, 2025.

=== Washington Nationals (second stint) ===
On November 15, 2025, Yean signed a minor league contract with the Washington Nationals. He made 39 appearances for the Triple-A Rochester Red Wings, compiling a 2-1 record and 3.60 ERA with 45 strikeouts and nine saves over 40 innings of work. On July 5, 2026, Yean was selected to the 40-man roster and promoted to the major leagues for the first time.
