= Josh Bell (first baseman) =

American baseball player (born 1992)

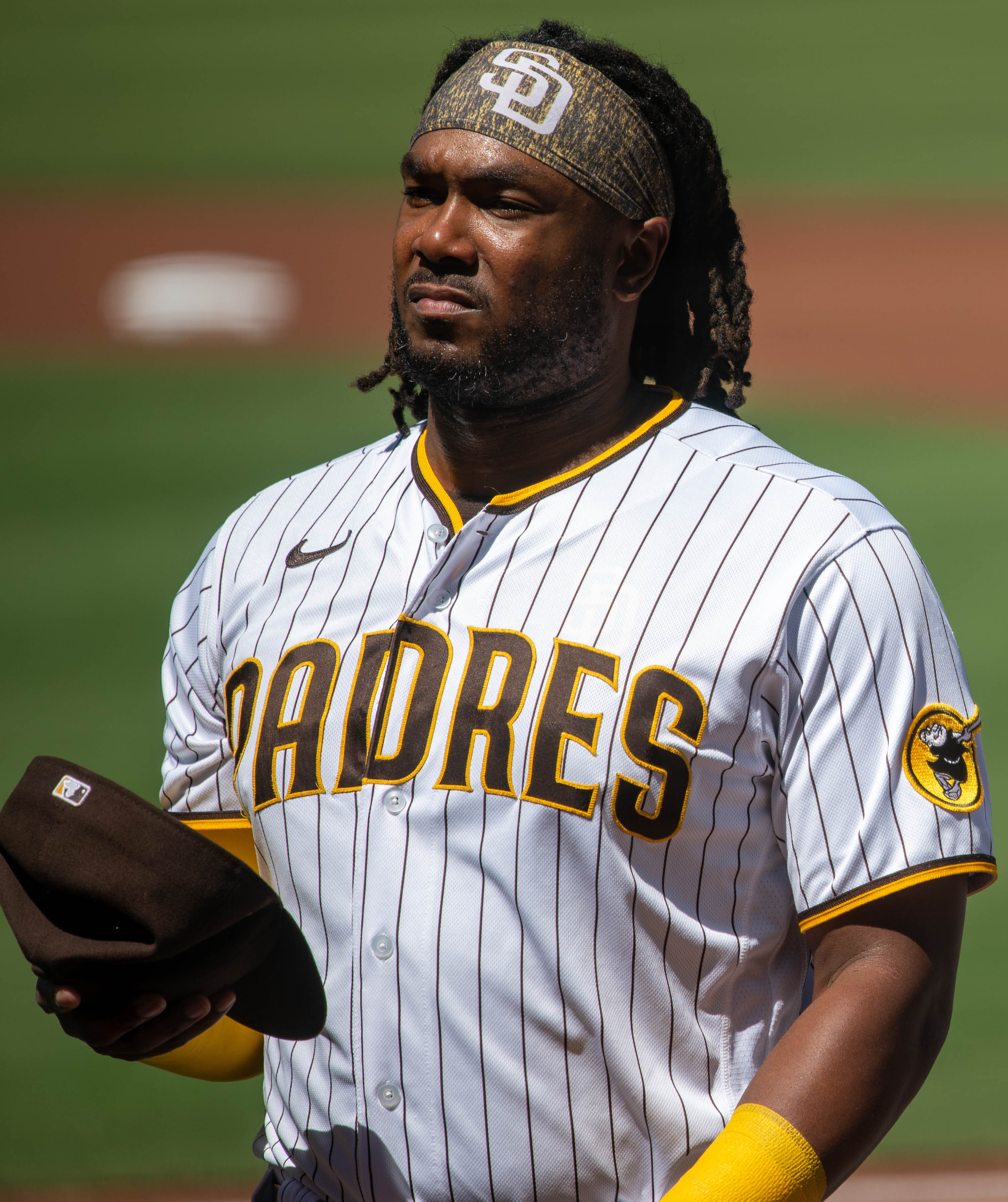
- Bell with the San Diego Padres in 2022

Free agent
- First baseman
- Born: August 14, 1992 (age 34); Irving, Texas, US.
- Bats: Switch Throws: Right

MLB debut
- July 8, 2016, for the Pittsburgh Pirates

MLB statistics (through 2026 season)
- Batting average: .256
- Home runs: 214
- Runs batted in: 772
- Stats at Baseball Reference

Teams
- Pittsburgh Pirates (2016–2020); Washington Nationals (2021–2022); San Diego Padres (2022); Cleveland Guardians (2023); Miami Marlins (2023–2024); Arizona Diamondbacks (2024); Washington Nationals (2025); Minnesota Twins (2026)

Career highlights and awards
- All-Star (2019); Silver Slugger Award (2022)

Joshua Evan Bell (born August 14, 1992) is an American professional baseball first baseman who is a free agent. He has previously played in Major League Baseball (MLB) for the Pittsburgh Pirates, Washington Nationals, San Diego Padres, Cleveland Guardians, Miami Marlins, Arizona Diamondbacks, and Minnesota Twins.

Bell attended Jesuit College Preparatory School of Dallas and was selected by the Pirates in the second round of the 2011 MLB draft. He received a $5 million signing bonus, a record for a player outside of the first round, to bypass his college baseball scholarship to the University of Texas at Austin. He played in MLB for the Pirates from 2016 through 2020, and was an All-Star in 2019. After the 2020 season, the Pirates traded Bell to the Nationals. During the 2022 season, the Nationals traded him to the Padres. During the 2023 season, the Guardians traded him to the Marlins. During the 2024 season, the Marlins traded him to the Diamondbacks. Then, during the 2024 offseason, Bell signed as a free agent with the Washington Nationals.

== Amateur career ==
Bell attended Jesuit College Preparatory School of Dallas in Dallas, Texas. In his senior season at Jesuit, he had a .548 batting average and 1.054 slugging percentage with 13 home runs, 54 runs batted in and 54 runs scored. He was named to the USA Today All-USA high school baseball team and was also named the Gatorade/ESPN Rise Texas Player of the Year.

Bell committed to attend the University of Texas at Austin on a scholarship that would allow him to play college baseball for the Texas Longhorns baseball team in the Big 12 Conference. Baseball America rated Bell as the nation's top corner outfielder available in the 2011 Major League Baseball draft. However, Bell sent a letter to the Commissioner of Baseball's office, indicating that teams should not select him, because he would follow through with his commitment to Texas, and would not sign a professional contract if drafted.

The Pirates drafted Bell in the second round, with the 61st overall selection, of the 2011 draft. Bell took twelve credits at the University of Texas and worked out with the team's strength and conditioning coach during the summer. Bell and the Pirates agreed to a contract with a $5 million signing bonus shortly before the August 2011 signing deadline. The signing bonus was a record for a player drafted in the second round. The Pirates gave out a record $17 million in signing bonuses to their 2011 draft class, surpassing the $11.93 million the Washington Nationals spent on their 2010 draft class.

== Professional career ==
=== Minor leagues (2011–2016) ===
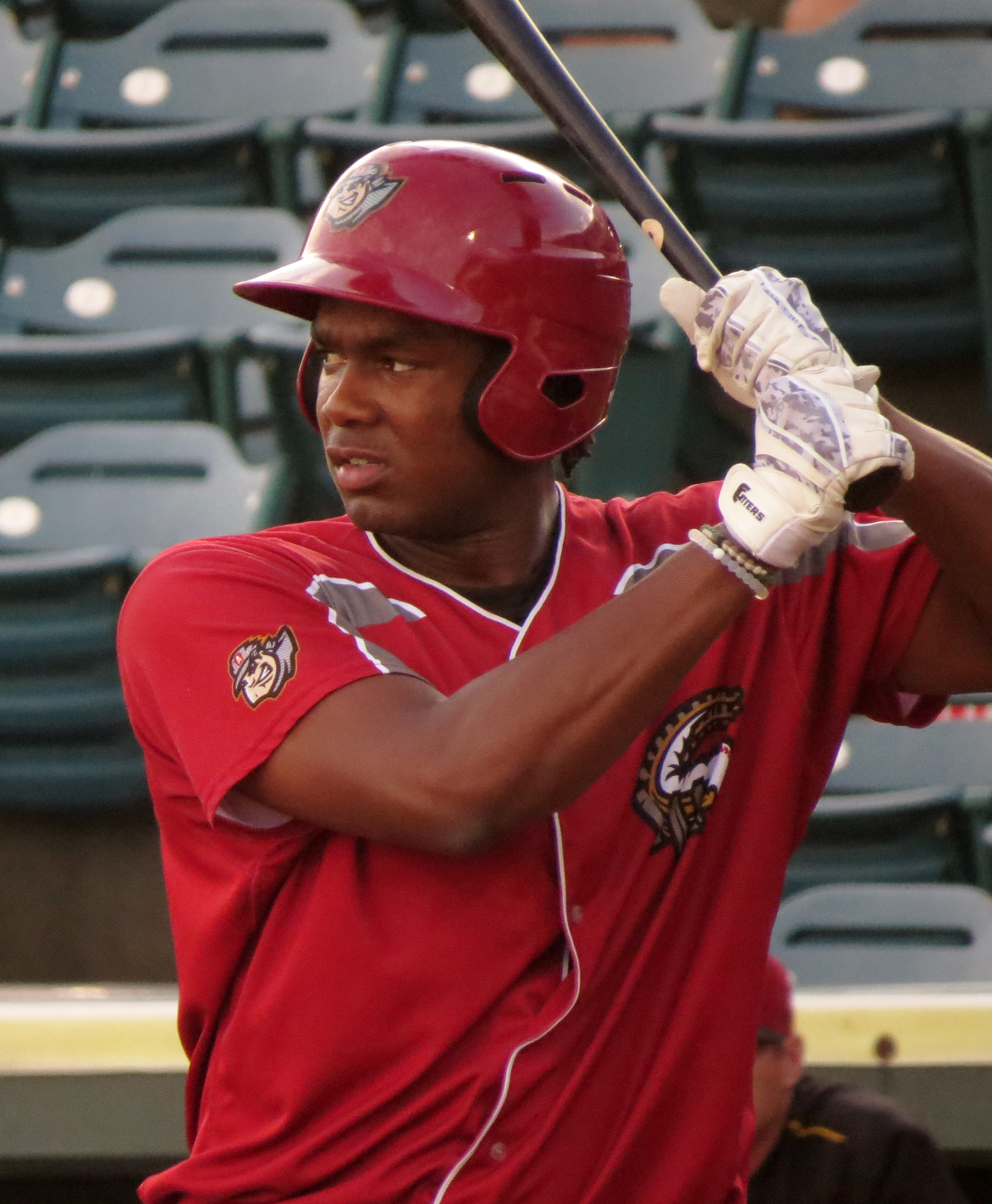
Bell with the Altoona Curve in 2015

The Pirates assigned Bell to work out with the State College Spikes, but as the season was ending, he did not appear in a game with the Spikes in 2011. Bell participated in the Pirates' fall instructional league. Bell was ranked the 69th best prospect in baseball by MLB.com before the 2012 season. He made his professional debut in 2012 with the West Virginia Power of the Single–A South Atlantic League. However, on April 24, 2012, Bell hit what would have been a double, but pulled up limping rounding first base, and was tagged out standing between first and second with an injury. Bell ended up having a partial tear of his meniscus, on the lateral part of the meniscus in his knee. Bell missed almost all of the 2012 minor league season and was out longer than expected due to swelling in the injured knee.

Bell again played for the West Virginia Power in 2013. He batted .279 with 13 home runs, 76 RBI, and 37 doubles in 119 games. Bell opened the 2014 season with the Bradenton Marauders of the High–A Florida State League (FSL), and appeared in the 2014 All-Star Futures Game. After hitting .335 with nine home runs and 35 RBI for Bradenton in 84 games, the Pirates promoted Bell to the Altoona Curve of the Double–A Eastern League on July 17. In 24 games for Altoona, he batted .287/.343/.309. After the season, he was named the FSL Player of the Year. The Pirates assigned Bell to the Arizona Fall League after the 2014 season, where he played exclusively as a first baseman, due to the Pirates carrying Andrew McCutchen, Starling Marte, and Gregory Polanco in their major league outfield.

The Pirates assigned Bell to Altoona to start the 2015 season. He was chosen to represent the Pirates at the 2015 All-Star Futures Game. At the end of July, the Pirates promoted Bell to the Indianapolis Indians of the Triple–A International League. In 96 games for Altoona, he batted .307 with five home runs and 60 RBI. He batted .347 with two home runs, 18 RBI, and a .441 on-base percentage in 145 plate appearances with Indianapolis, and the Pirates added Bell to their 40-man roster after the season.

Bell began the 2016 season with Indianapolis. He began the season by batting .324 with a .407 on-base percentage in 83 games for the Indians.

=== Pittsburgh Pirates (2016–2020) ===
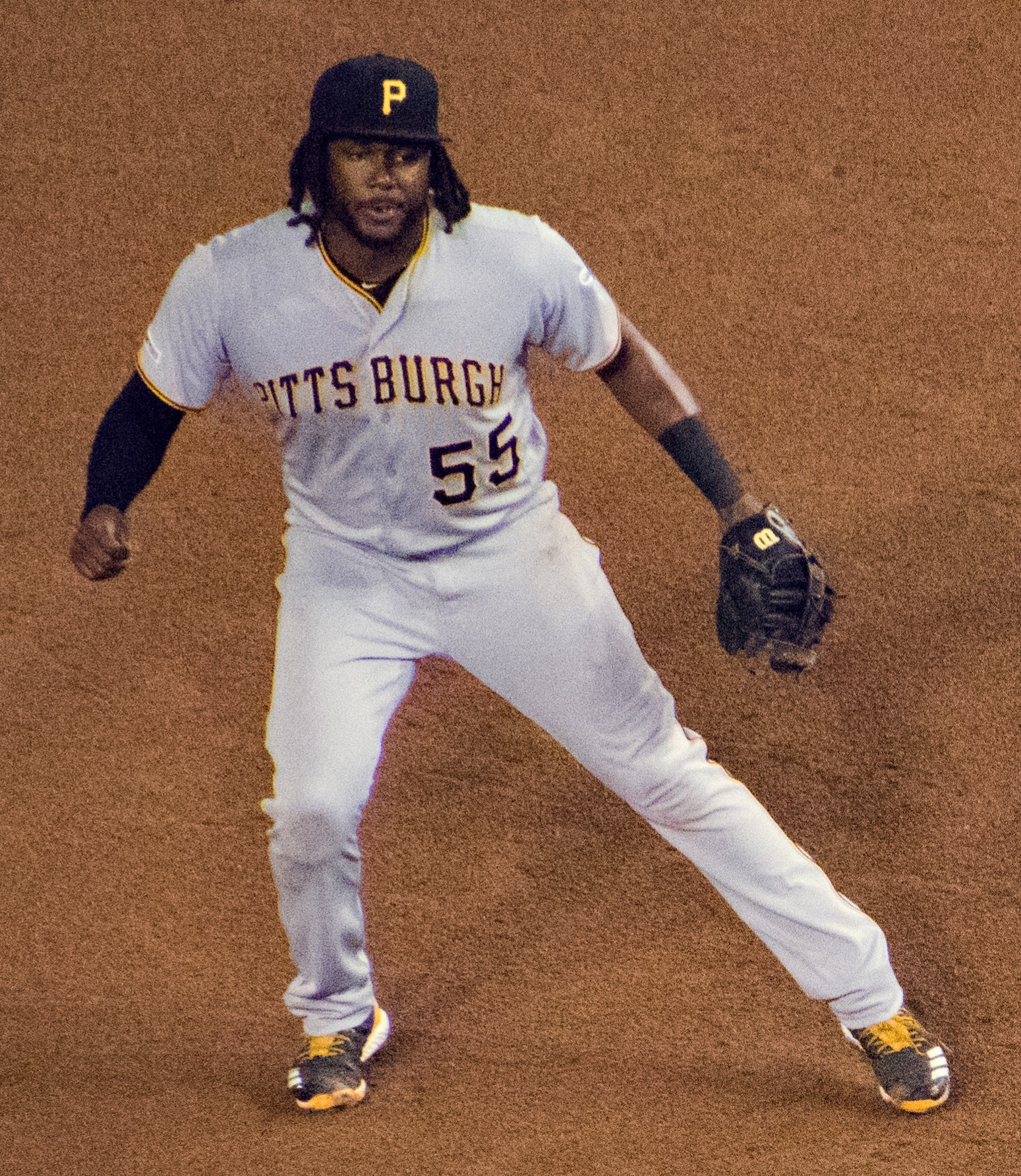
Bell with the Pittsburgh Pirates in 2019

Bell made his major league debut with the Pirates at the age of 23 on July 8, 2016. He made his MLB debut that night as a pinch hitter, and hit a grand slam in his second MLB at-bat on July 9. He was optioned back to Indianapolis on July 16, and recalled once again on August 20. In 128 at-bats for Pittsburgh, Bell batted .273 with three home runs and 19 RBIs.

On February 1, 2017, Bell underwent left knee surgery, but did not go on the disabled list or miss any games. On September 4, Bell broke the National League record for most home runs by a rookie switch hitter, hitting his 24th of the season off of Jake Arrieta, in a 12–0 Pirates' victory over the Chicago Cubs. He was one of three finalists for the 2017 Rookie of the Year award along with Cody Bellinger and Paul DeJong, and finished in third place in the balloting. Bell finished the season with a .255 batting average, 26 home runs and 90 RBIs. In 2018, he batted .261 with 12 home runs and 62 RBIs.

On May 8, 2019, Bell became the fourth player in PNC Park history to hit a ball directly into the Allegheny River; the ball traveled 472 feet (144 m) with an exit velocity of 114.9 miles per hour (184.9 km/h). Two weeks later, Bell became the first MLB player to hit two home runs directly into the Allegheny River. Bell was elected to his first MLB All-Star Game on June 30, 2019. At the time of the All-Star Game, Bell was batting .302 with 27 home runs and an MLB-leading 84 RBIs. Bell also participated in the 2019 Home Run Derby where he was eliminated in the first round. Bell struggled in the second half of the season, batting .233 with 10 home runs, to finish the season with a .277 average, 37 home runs, and 116 RBIs.

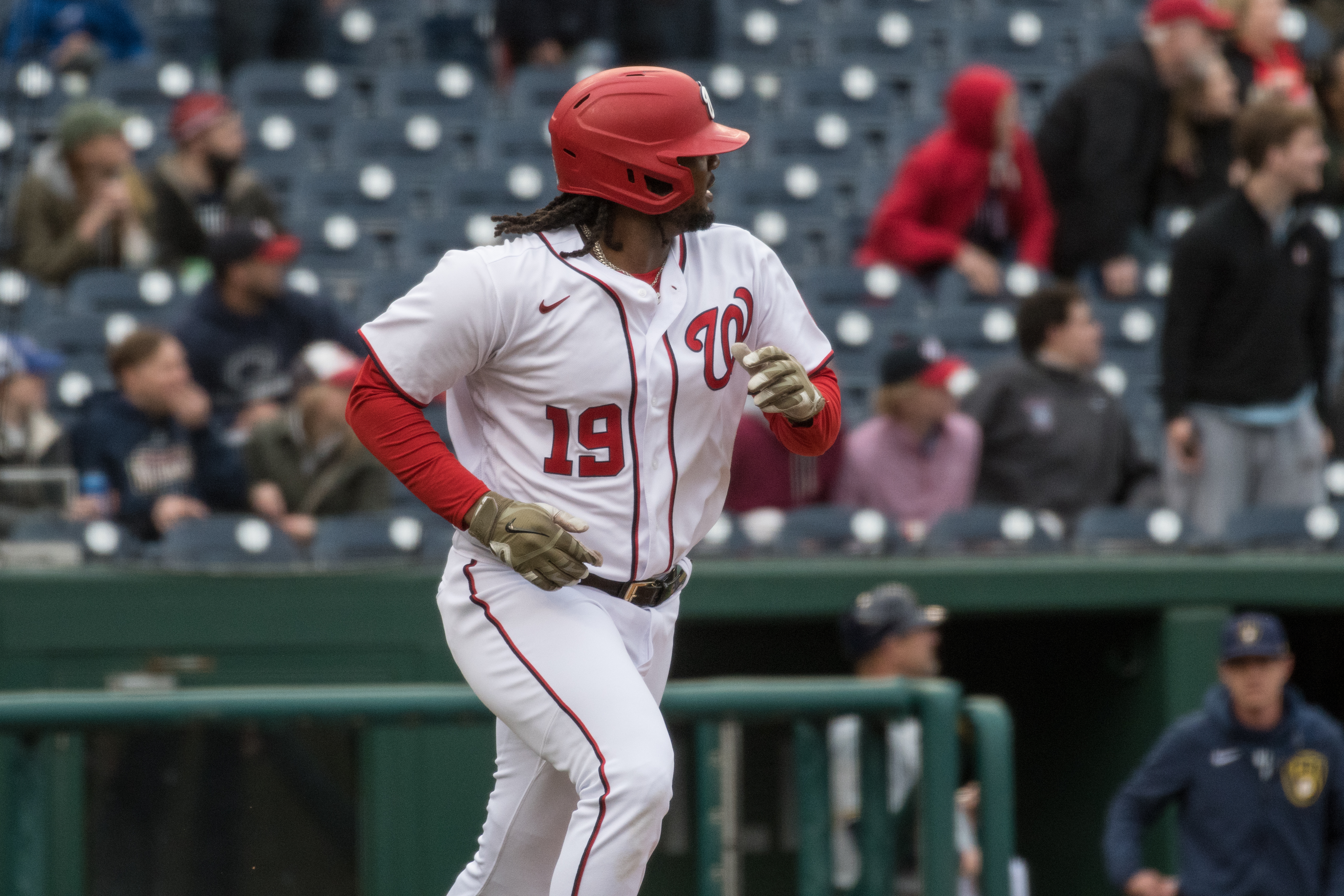
Bell in 2021

Bell and the Pirates agreed to a $4.8 million salary for the 2020 season. During the season, which was shortened due to the COVID-19 pandemic, Bell hit .226 with eight home runs and 22 RBIs.

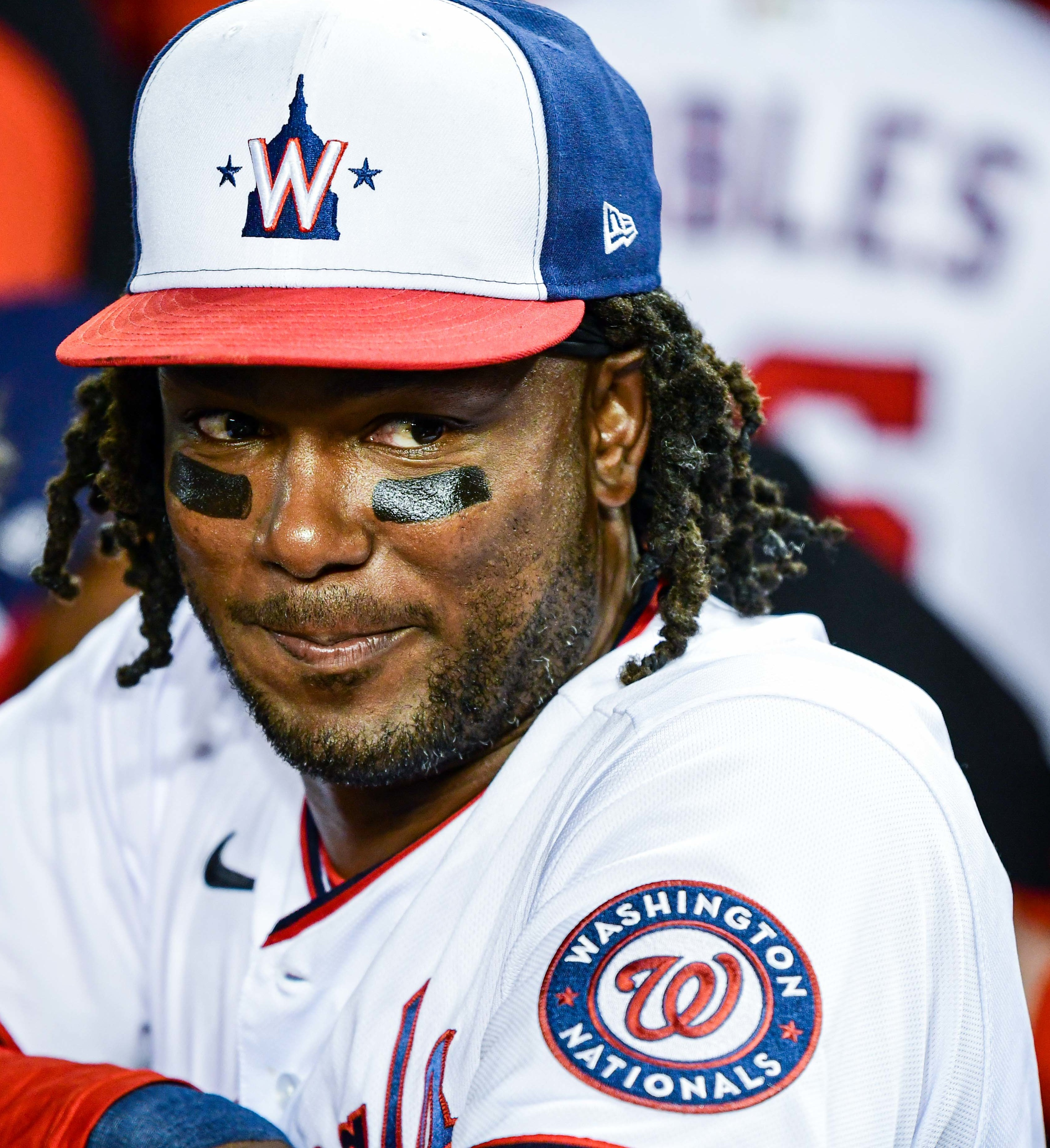
Bell with the Nationals in 2022

=== Washington Nationals (2021–2022) ===
On December 24, 2020, the Pirates traded Bell to the Washington Nationals in exchange for Wil Crowe and Eddy Yean. Bell and the Nationals agreed to a $6.35 million salary for the 2021 season, avoiding salary arbitration. On April 20, 2021, Bell hit his first home run with the Nationals. He finished the 2021 season batting .261/.347/.476 with 27 home runs and 88 RBIs in 144 games.

In his final year of eligibility for salary arbitration, Bell signed a $10 million contract with the Nationals before the 2022 season. Bell had a slash line of .301/.384/.493 with 14 home runs in 103 games for the Nationals in 2022.

=== San Diego Padres (2022) ===
On August 2, 2022, Bell, along with Juan Soto, was traded to the San Diego Padres in exchange for C. J. Abrams, MacKenzie Gore, Robert Hassell III, James Wood, Jarlín Susana and Luke Voit. He hit his first home run for the Padres in a game against the Nationals on August 20, 2022. His hitting fell to 192/.316/.271 with San Diego, and he lost playing time in the playoffs.

=== Cleveland Guardians (2023) ===
On December 12, 2022, the Cleveland Guardians signed Bell to a two-year, $33 million contract. The deal includes a player opt-out clause after the 2023 season. Bell batted .233 with eight home runs and 48 RBI in 97 games for the Guardians in 2023.

=== Miami Marlins (2023–2024) ===
On August 1, 2023, Bell was traded to the Miami Marlins in exchange for infielders Jean Segura and Kahlil Watson. In 53 games for Miami, he batted .270/.338/.480 with 11 home runs and 26 RBI.

Bell played in 104 games for the Marlins in 2024, hitting .239/.305/.394 with 14 home runs and 49 RBI.

=== Arizona Diamondbacks (2024) ===
On July 30, 2024, the Marlins traded Bell to the Arizona Diamondbacks in exchange for cash considerations or a player to be named later. He debuted with the team on August 2 and homered from both sides of the plate in 9–8 win over the Pirates. In 41 appearances for the Diamondbacks, Bell slashed .279/.361/.436 with five home runs and 22 RBI.

=== Washington Nationals (Second Stint) (2025) ===
On January 5, 2025, Bell returned to the Washington Nationals, signing a one-year, $6 million contract. On September 8, Bell became the second player in franchise history, after Danny Espinosa, to hit home runs from both sides of the plate in the same game, which he did in consecutive innings, in a 15-7 win over the Miami Marlins. He made 140 appearances for the Nationals, batting .237/.325/.417 with 22 home runs and 63 RBI.

=== Minnesota Twins (2026–present) ===
On December 19, 2025, Bell signed a one-year, $7 million contract with the Minnesota Twins. On October 30, the Twins declined their half of a mutual option making him a free agent.
