= Cam Vieaux =

American baseball player (born 1993)

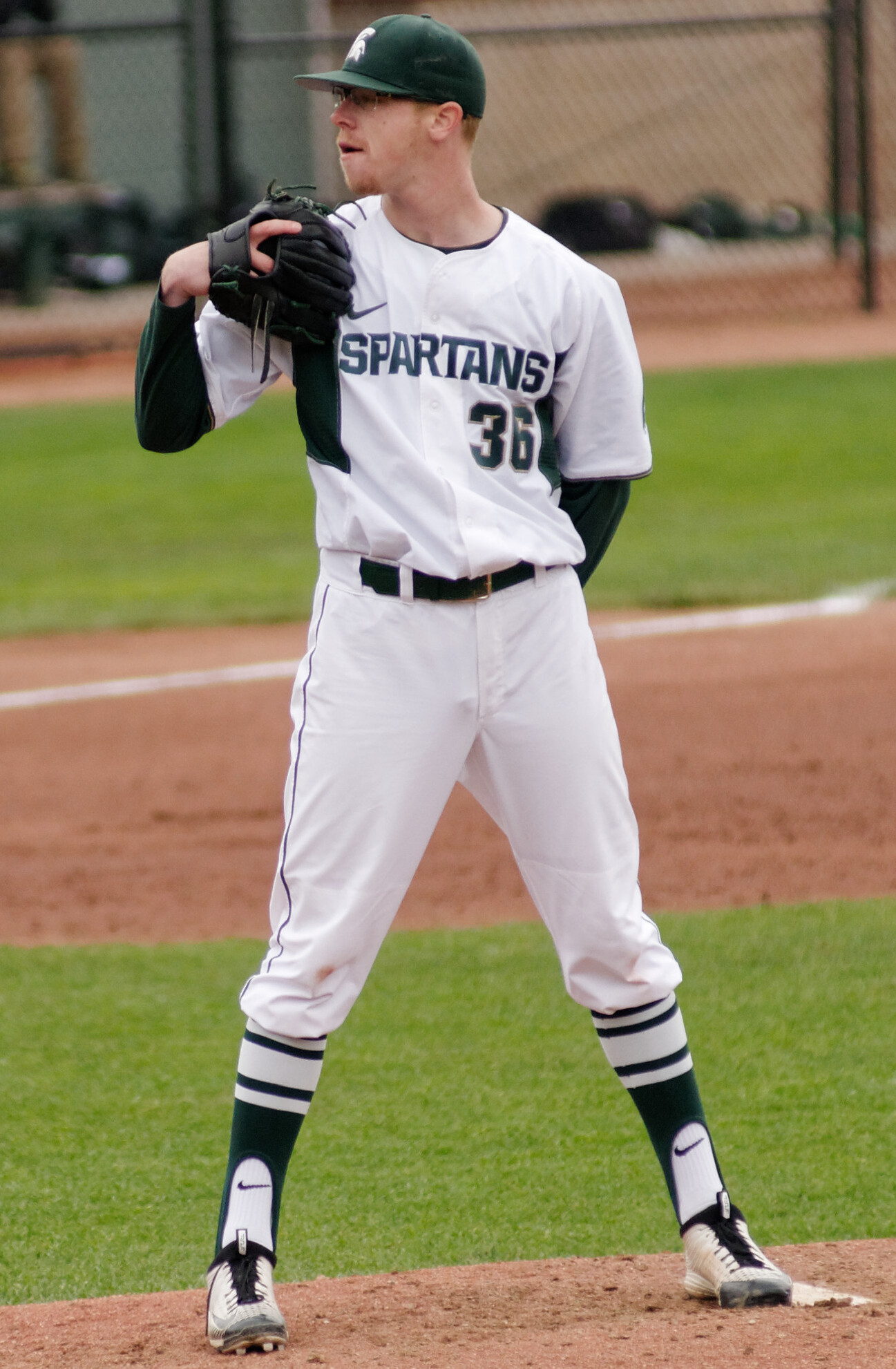
- Vieaux at Michigan State in 2016
- Pitcher
- Born: December 5, 1993 (age 32); Novi, Michigan, U.S.
- Batted: Left Threw: Left

MLB debut
- June 17, 2022, for the Pittsburgh Pirates

Last MLB appearance
- August 27, 2022, for the Pittsburgh Pirates

MLB statistics
- Win–loss record: 0–0
- Earned run average: 10.38
- Strikeouts: 15
- Stats at Baseball Reference

Teams
- Pittsburgh Pirates (2022)
Medals
Men's baseball
Representing United States
WBSC Premier12
Bronze medal – third place	2024 Tokyo	Team

Cameron Scott Vieaux (born December 5, 1993) is an American former professional baseball pitcher. He played in Major League Baseball (MLB) for the Pittsburgh Pirates in 2022.

== Amateur career ==
Vieaux graduated from Walled Lake Western High School in Commerce Township, Michigan. He played baseball for Walled Lake Western, but was not drafted out of high school. Vieaux enrolled at Michigan State University and walked on to the Michigan State Spartans baseball team. In 2015, as a redshirt sophomore, Vieaux had a 4–7 win–loss record and a 3.49 earned run average (ERA). He then played collegiate summer baseball with the Harwich Mariners of the Cape Cod Baseball League. The Detroit Tigers selected Vieaux in the 19th round, with the 580th overall selection, of the 2015 MLB draft. He did not sign, returning to Michigan State for another year. As Michigan State's top starting pitcher in 2016, Vieaux had a 7–4 win–loss record and a 2.28 earned run average.

== Professional career ==
=== Pittsburgh Pirates ===
The Pirates chose Vieaux in the sixth round, with the 195th overall selection, of the 2016 MLB draft, and he signed with the Pirates for a reported $175,000 signing bonus. He made his professional debut with the Low-A West Virginia Black Bears. Vieaux split the 2017 season between the Single-A West Virginia Power and High-A Bradenton Marauders, accumulating a 5-10 record and 3.82 ERA with 81 strikeouts across 141 1/3 innings pitched.

Vieaux split the 2018 season between Bradenton and the Double-A Altoona Curve. In 25 starts for the two affiliates, he posted a cumulative 13-6 record and 3.68 ERA with 124 strikeouts across 144 1/3 innings pitched. Vieaux made 26 starts for Altoona and the Triple-A Indianapolis Indians in 2019, pitching to a combined 8-6 record and 3.50 ERA with 120 strikeouts over 139 innings of work.

Vieaux turned to coaching when the 2020 minor league season was cancelled due to the COVID-19 pandemic; as a result, he did not play for the organization that year. He returned to action in 2021 with Altoona and Indianapolis. In 25 appearances (13 starts) split between the two affiliates, Vieaux compiled a 7-3 record and 5.28 ERA with 72 strikeouts across 73 1/3 innings pitched.

On June 17, 2022, Vieaux was selected to the 40-man roster and promoted to the major leagues for the first time. He was designated for assignment on July 11, after five appearances for the team. Vieaux cleared waivers and was sent outright to Indianapolis on July 15. The Pirates promoted Vieaux back to the major leagues on August 21. He made eight total appearances for Pittsburgh, but struggled to a 10.38 ERA with 15 strikeouts across 8 2/3 innings pitched. On September 6, Vieaux was designated for assignment following the acquisitions of Zack Collins and Junior Fernández. He cleared waivers and was sent outright to Triple–A Indianapolis on September 10. Vieaux elected free agency on October 7.

=== Los Angeles Angels ===
On December 31, 2022, Vieaux signed a minor league deal with the Los Angeles Angels. He spent the 2023 season with the Triple–A Salt Lake Bees, making 50 appearances and logging a 4–4 record and 5.23 ERA with 71 strikeouts. Vieaux elected free agency following the season on November 6, 2023.

=== Tecolotes de los Dos Laredos ===
On February 13, 2024, Vieaux signed with the Tecolotes de los Dos Laredos of the Mexican League. In 31 games (1 start) for Dos Laredos, he posted a 1–1 record and 5.34 ERA with 24 strikeouts across 28 2/3 innings pitched.

Vieaux was released by the Tecolotes on April 14, 2025. He re-signed with the Tecolotes on May 7. Vieaux made one start for the team, allowing six runs on three hits and three walks in one inning pitched. He was released by Dos Laredos on May 12.

=== Westside Woolly Mammoths ===
Following his departure from the Mexican League, Vieaux signed with the Westside Woolly Mammoths of the United Shore Professional Baseball League. Vieaux has collected 3 wins for the team in 3 appearances. On August 16, 2025, Vieaux tossed a six inning perfect game against the Eastside Diamond Hoppers, striking out seven.
