= Junior Fernández =

Dominican baseball player (born 1997)

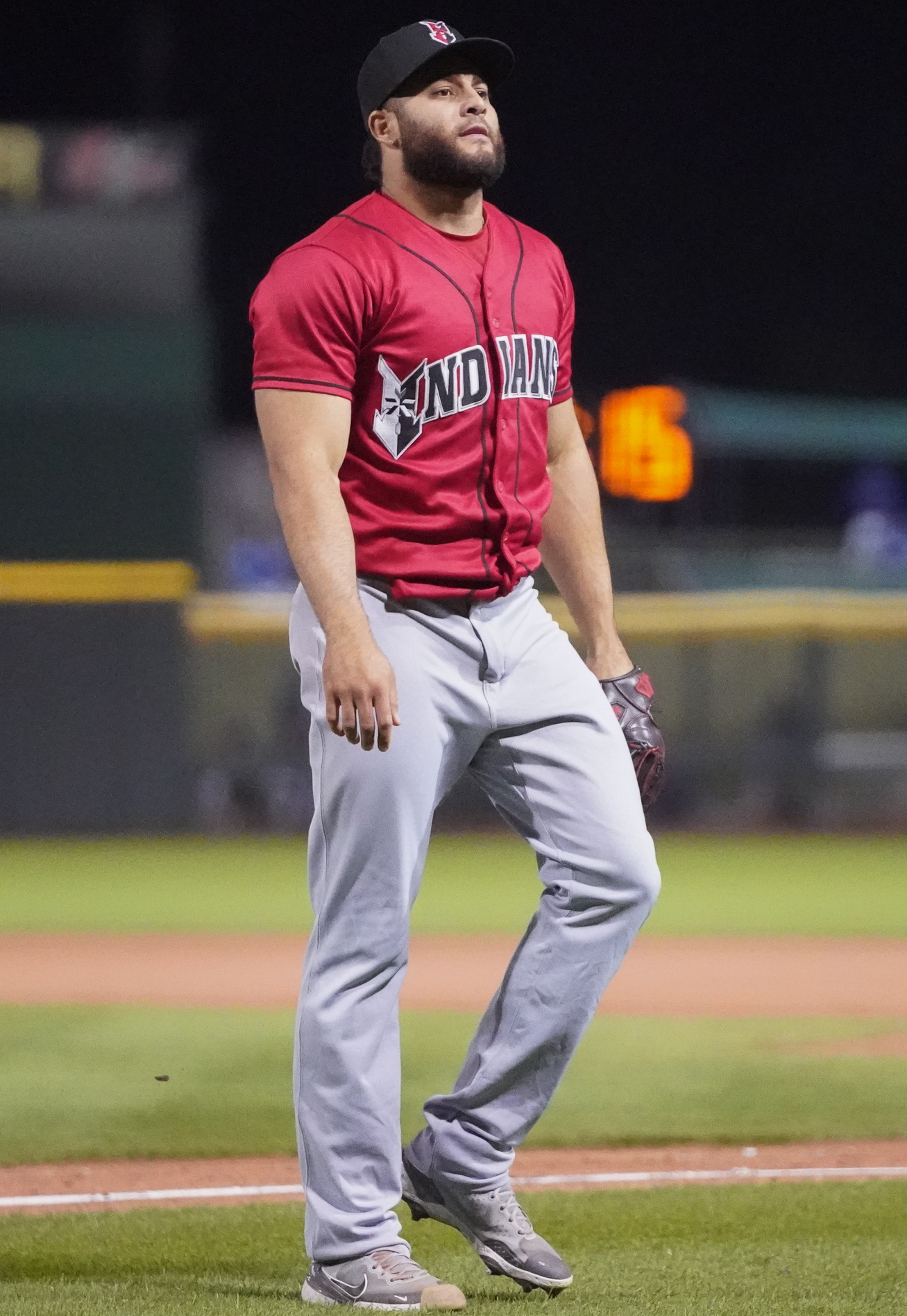
- Fernández with the Indianapolis Indians in 2022

Sultanes de Monterrey – No. 97
- Pitcher
- Born: March 2, 1997 (age 29); Santo Domingo, Dominican Republic
- Bats: Right Throws: Right

MLB debut
- August 11, 2019, for the St. Louis Cardinals

MLB statistics (through 2022 season)
- Win–loss record: 1–1
- Earned run average: 5.17
- Strikeouts: 47
- Stats at Baseball Reference

Teams
- St. Louis Cardinals (2019–2022); Pittsburgh Pirates (2022)

Junior Fabio Fernández (born March 2, 1997) is a Dominican professional baseball pitcher for the Sultanes de Monterrey of the Mexican League. He has previously played in Major League Baseball (MLB) for the St. Louis Cardinals and Pittsburgh Pirates.

== Career ==
=== St. Louis Cardinals ===
Fernández signed with the St. Louis Cardinals as an international free agent in July 2014.

Fernández made his professional debut that year with the Dominican Summer League Cardinals, posting an 0–5 record and a 5.79 ERA over seven games (six starts). He spent 2015 with the rookie-level Gulf Coast League Cardinals, going 3–2 with a 3.88 ERA in 11 games (nine starts) and also appeared in two games with the Palm Beach Cardinals, giving up one run over 6 2/3 innings. Fernández started 2016 with the Peoria Chiefs and was promoted to the Palm Beach Cardinals in July. He finished the 2016 season with a combined 8–7 record and 4.06 ERA in 24 games (20 starts) between both clubs.

Fernández returned to Palm Beach for the 2017 season where he was named a Florida State League All-Star, posting a 5–3 record with a 3.69 ERA over 16 starts. He began 2018 back with Palm Beach and was promoted to the Springfield Cardinals during the season. He missed over two months of the season due to injury, and was placed on the disabled list twice. Over 24 relief appearances between the two teams, he went 1–0 with a 3.52 ERA.

Fernández began the 2019 season with Palm Beach. He was promoted to Springfield in May, and he earned another promotion to the Triple-A Memphis Redbirds in June. In the more than 65 innings he pitched between the three teams for the season, he went 3–2 with a 1.52 ERA, striking out eighty.

On August 6, 2019, the Cardinals selected Fernández's contract and promoted him to the major leagues. He made his debut on August 11 versus the Pittsburgh Pirates, allowing two runs in 2/3 of an inning. Over 13 relief appearances with St. Louis, he pitched to a 5.40 ERA.

Fernández began the 2020 season with St. Louis. On August 4, 2020, it was announced that he had tested positive for COVID-19, and was subsequently placed on the injured list. He pitched a total of three innings during the season.

The following season, Fernández made 18 appearances for St. Louis, posting a 5.66 ERA with 15 strikeouts in 20 2/3 innings pitched. He ended the year on the injured list with a right shoulder strain. In 13 appearances for the Cardinals in 2022, Fernández pitched well, posting a 2.93 ERA with 12 strikeouts in 15 1/3 innings of work. On September 5, 2022, Fernández was designated for assignment.

=== Pittsburgh Pirates ===
On September 7, 2022, Fernández was claimed off waivers by the Pittsburgh Pirates. He made three scoreless appearances for Pittsburgh, striking out two in 3 2/3 innings of work. On November 15, Fernández was designated for assignment.

=== Toronto Blue Jays ===
On November 18, 2022, Fernández was claimed off waivers by the New York Yankees. He was designated for assignment on December 21.

Fernández was claimed off waivers by the Toronto Blue Jays on January 5, 2023. On January 10, Fernández designated for assignment by the Blue Jays following the acquisition of Zach Thompson. On January 17, Fernández cleared waivers and was sent outright to the Triple-A Buffalo Bisons. In 42 appearances for Triple–A Buffalo, he registered a 5.69 ERA with 46 strikeouts in 49.0 innings of work. Fernández was released by the Blue Jays organization on August 22.

=== Washington Nationals ===
On August 29, 2023, Fernández signed a minor league contract with the Washington Nationals organization. In 9 appearances for the Triple–A Rochester Red Wings, he recorded a 2.79 ERA with 6 strikeouts in 9 2/3 innings of work. Fernández elected free agency following the season on November 6.

=== Chiba Lotte Marines ===
On December 9, 2023, Fernández signed with the Chiba Lotte Marines of Nippon Professional Baseball. On May 11, 2024, he was diagnosed with right distal clavicle lysis, and underwent cleaning surgery that ruled him out for two months. Fernández was released by Chiba Lotte on July 24, having only made two scoreless appearances for their farm team.

=== Kansas City Royals ===
On December 20, 2024, Fernández signed a minor league contract with the Kansas City Royals. In 31 appearances for the Triple-A Omaha Storm Chasers, he posted a 2–5 record and 4.93 ERA with 53 strikeouts and two saves across 38 1/3 innings pitched. Fernández was released by the Royals organization on July 1, 2025.

=== New York Mets ===
On July 8, 2025, Fernández signed a minor league contract with the New York Mets. He made four scoreless appearances for the Triple-A Syracuse Mets, recording four strikeouts across 4 2/3 innings pitched. Fernández was released by the Mets organization on August 2.

=== Milwaukee Brewers ===
On November 13, 2025, Fernández signed a minor league contract with the Arizona Diamondbacks. He did not appear in a game during his time with the organization.

On April 15, 2026, Fernández was traded to the Milwaukee Brewers. In 26 appearances for the Triple–A Nashville Sounds, he compiled a 2–2 record and 4.65 ERA with 28 strikeouts and three saves over 31 innings of relief. Fernández was released by the Brewers organization on July 16.

=== Sultanes de Monterrey ===
On August 4, 2026, Fernández signed with the Sultanes de Monterrey of the Mexican League.
