= Wil Crowe =

American baseball player (born 1994)

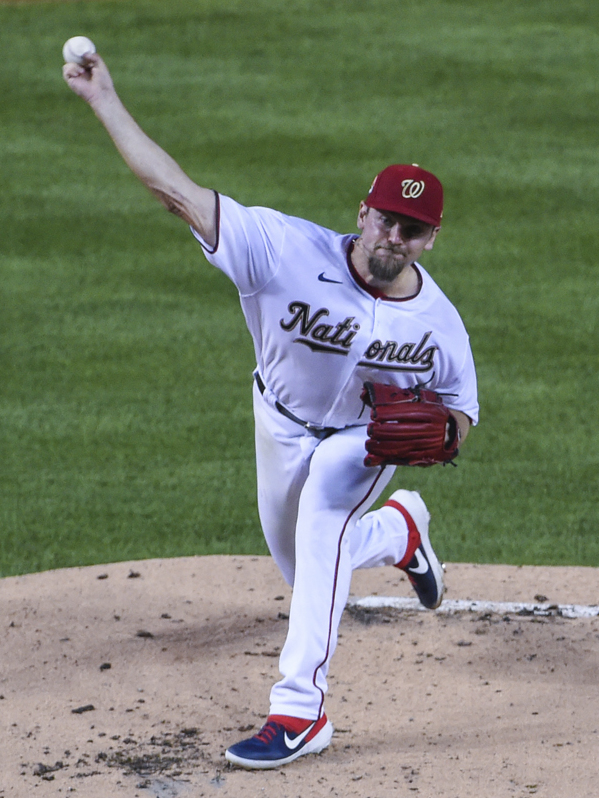
- Crowe with the Washington Nationals in 2020
- Pitcher
- Born: September 9, 1994 (age 32); Kingston, Tennessee, U.S.
- Batted: Right Threw: Right

Professional debut
- MLB: August 22, 2020, for the Washington Nationals
- KBO: March 23, 2024, for the Kia Tigers

Last appearance
- MLB: April 17, 2023, for the Pittsburgh Pirates
- KBO: May 4, 2024, for the Kia Tigers

MLB statistics
- Win–loss record: 10–21
- Earned run average: 5.30
- Strikeouts: 196

KBO statistics
- Win–loss record: 5–1
- Earned run average: 3.57
- Strikeouts: 43
- Stats at Baseball Reference

Teams
- Washington Nationals (2020); Pittsburgh Pirates (2021–2023); Kia Tigers (2024)

William Chandler Crowe (born September 9, 1994) is an American former professional baseball pitcher. He played in Major League Baseball (MLB) for the Washington Nationals and Pittsburgh Pirates, and in the KBO League for the Kia Tigers.

== Amateur career ==
Crowe attended Pigeon Forge High School in Sevier County, Tennessee. The Cleveland Indians selected him in the 31st round of the 2013 Major League Baseball draft. He declined to sign, instead of attending the University of South Carolina, where he pitched for the South Carolina Gamecocks.

While at South Carolina, in April 2015, Crowe tore the ulnar collateral ligament in his right throwing elbow and underwent Tommy John surgery performed by Dr. James Andrews. He spent the next two years rehabbing with fellow Gamecocks pitcher Cody Morris, who described Crowe as "a mentor" to him during the process even though Crowe had his elbow procedure just a month sooner. Crowe made his return to pitching on June 1, 2016, starting the home opener for the Lexington County Blowfish and showing off a sharp slider and a fastball that reached 95 miles per hour (153 km/h). The Indians again selected him in the 2016 MLB draft, using their 21st-round pick on him, but Crowe again did not sign, returning to South Carolina as a redshirt junior.

Crowe led the Gamecocks in strikeouts while posting a 3.41 ERA across 92⅓ innings in 2017 before being drafted with the 65th overall pick by the Nationals in the 2017 MLB draft, who were known for selecting amateur players who had previously had or needed to undergo Tommy John surgery. Crowe received a $946,500 signing bonus from the Nationals, in line with the slot value of the selection.

== Professional career ==
=== Washington Nationals ===
After Crowe's signing, MLB Prospect Watch ranked him as the Nationals' sixth-best prospect, with Baseball America listing him eighth. Crowe made his professional debut with the rookie–level Gulf Coast League Nationals, and after giving up two earned runs in 3 2/3 innings, was promoted to the Auburn Doubledays, where he finished the season, posting a 2.61 ERA with a 1.02 WHIP in seven games started. Crowe opened his season with the High–A Potomac Nationals in 2018 by winning eleven straight decisions, earning a berth in the Carolina League All-Star Game. He was promoted to the Double–A Harrisburg Senators midway through the season, losing all five of his decisions at the higher level. After the season, Crowe was named a co-Minor League Pitcher of the Year (with Ben Braymer) by the Nationals.

In 2019, Crowe was invited to participate in his first major league spring training as a non-roster invitee, giving him the opportunity to work with veteran Nationals pitchers Patrick Corbin, Max Scherzer, and Stephen Strasburg, something he described to The Washington Post as "like getting a PhD in pitching". He was ranked before the season as the fifth-best prospect in the Nationals organization by MLB Pipeline, and the team's second-best pitching prospect behind Mason Denaburg.

Crowe made his Major League Baseball debut on August 22, 2020, starting the second game of a doubleheader against the Miami Marlins.

=== Pittsburgh Pirates ===
On December 24, 2020, the Nationals traded Crowe and Eddy Yean to the Pittsburgh Pirates for Josh Bell. Crowe made 26 appearances (25 starts) for Pittsburgh in 2021, registering a 4–8 record and 5.48 ERA with 111 strikeouts in 116.2 innings pitched.

In 2022, Crowe pitched in 60 games for the Pirates, posting a 6–10 record and 4.38 ERA with 68 strikeouts and 4 saves in 76.0 innings pitched. On September 20, 2022, Crowe delivered a pitch that Aaron Judge hit for his 60th home run of the season, tying Babe Ruth for the second-most in New York Yankees history. In that same game, Giancarlo Stanton hit a walk-off grand slam to end the game against Crowe.

Crowe made 5 appearances with the team to begin the 2023 season before he was placed on the 60-day injured list on April 29, 2023, with a right shoulder issue. On July 19, Crowe was activated from the injured list and subsequently designated for assignment. He cleared waivers and was sent outright to the Triple–A Indianapolis Indians on July 25. Crowe was released by the Pirates organization on November 16.

=== Kia Tigers ===
On January 6, 2024, Crowe signed a one-year, $800,000 contract with the Kia Tigers of the KBO League. In 8 starts for the Tigers, he compiled a 5–1 record and 3.57 ERA with 43 strikeouts across 40 1/3 innings pitched. On May 29, Crowe was declared inactive due to an elbow injury, and was temporarily replaced by Cam Alldred. On May 31, it was announced that he would undergo elbow surgery, likely ending his season. Crowe was waived by the Tigers on August 5.

=== Philadelphia Phillies ===
On May 20, 2025, Crowe signed a minor league contract with the Philadelphia Phillies. He made 13 appearances (11 starts) for the Double-A Reading Fightin Phils and Triple-A Lehigh Valley IronPigs, compiling a cumulative 3-5 record and 7.74 ERA with 32 strikeouts over 43 innings of work. Crowe was released by the Phillies organization on August 22.

On September 18, 2025, Crowe announced his retirement from professional baseball.

== Pitching style ==
Crowe throws both four-seam and two-seam fastballs, reaching 94 miles per hour (151 km/h) as of 2018. He complements his fastballs with a changeup, curveball, and slider. In his downtime, Crowe studies baseball analytics.

== Personal life ==
Crowe and his wife, Hilary, married in December 2018. His great-great uncle is Red Ruffing, a Hall of Fame pitcher buried in Bedford Heights, Ohio.
