= Cam Alldred =

American baseball player (born 1996)

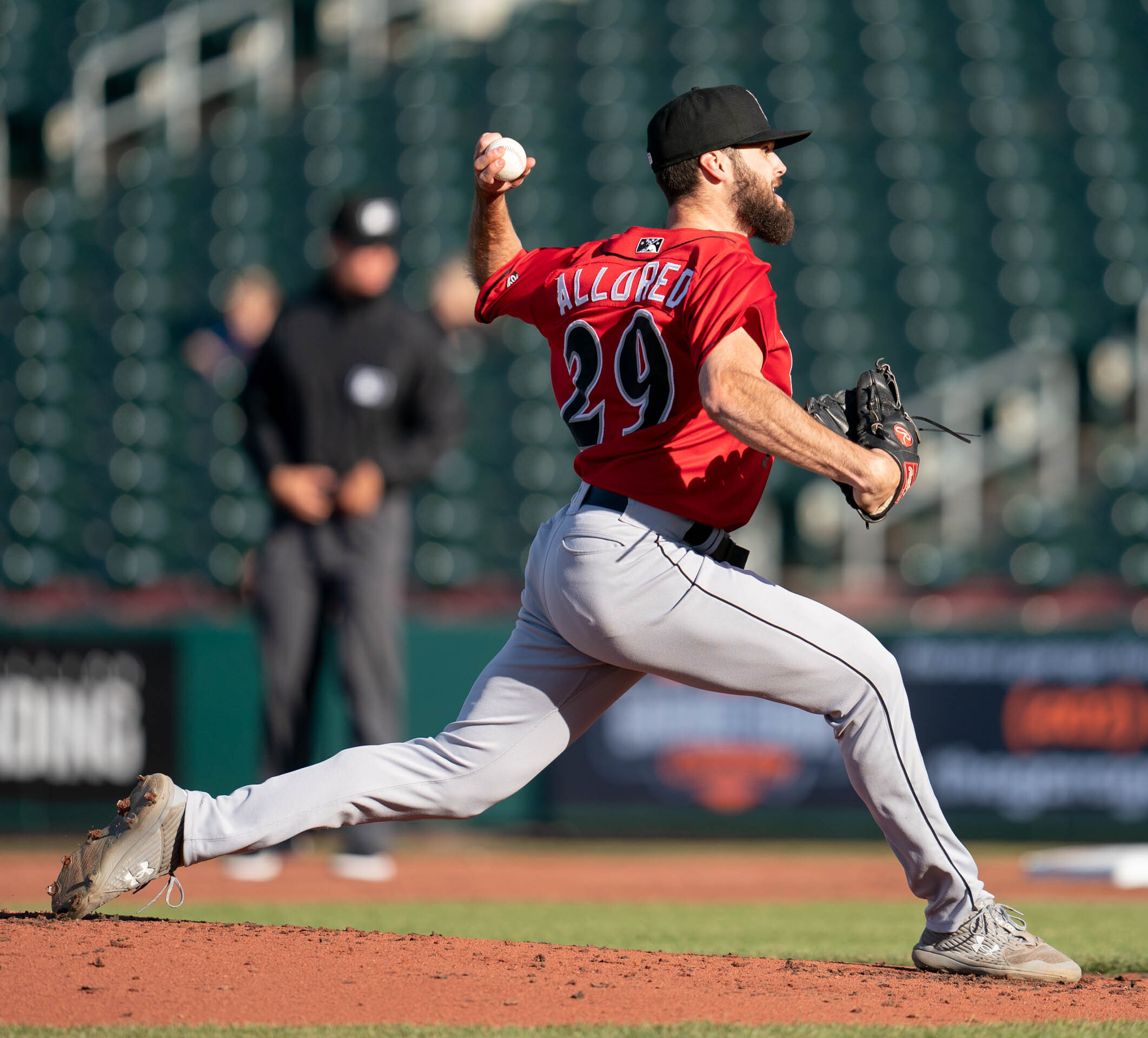
- Alldred with the Indianapolis Indians in 2024

Free agent
- Pitcher
- Born: July 25, 1996 (age 30); Batavia, Ohio, U.S.
- Bats: Left Throws: Left

Professional debut
- MLB: May 12, 2022, for the Pittsburgh Pirates
- KBO: June 8, 2024, for the Kia Tigers
- CPBL: August 24, 2025, for the Uni-President Lions

MLB statistics (through 2022 season)
- Win–loss record: 0–0
- Earned run average: 0.00
- Strikeouts: 1

KBO statistics (through 2024 season)
- Win–loss record: 3–2
- Earned run average: 4.53
- Strikeouts: 52

CPBL statistics (through 2025 season)
- Win–loss record: 3–1
- Earned run average: 2.08
- Strikeouts: 30
- Stats at Baseball Reference

Teams
- Pittsburgh Pirates (2022); Kia Tigers (2024); Uni-President Lions (2025)

Cameron Mitchell Alldred (born July 25, 1996) is an American professional baseball pitcher who is a free agent. He has previously played in Major League Baseball (MLB) for the Pittsburgh Pirates, in the KBO League for the Kia Tigers, and in the Chinese Professional Baseball League (CPBL) for the Uni-President Lions.

== Amateur career ==
Alldred attended Cincinnati Country Day School and played college baseball at the University of Cincinnati. After his senior year at Cincinnati, he was drafted by the Pittsburgh Pirates in the 24th round of the 2018 Major League Baseball draft.

== Professional career ==
=== Pittsburgh Pirates ===
Alldred was drafted by the Pittsburgh Pirates in the 24th round, 714th overall, of the 2018 Major League Baseball draft. He split his first professional season between the Low-A West Virginia Black Bears and the Single-A West Virginia Power, pitching to a 1.80 ERA with 32 strikeouts in 20 total games. In 2019, he played for the Single-A Greensboro Grasshoppers, logging a 4–1 record and 4.20 ERA with 63 strikeouts in 60 innings pitched across 39 games.

Alldred did not play in a game in 2020 due to the cancellation of the minor league season because of the COVID-19 pandemic. He split the 2021 season between the Double-A Altoona Curve and Triple-A Indianapolis Indians, recording a cumulative 4–0 record and 2.18 ERA with 59 strikeouts in 66 innings of work across 33 total games.

He was assigned to Indianapolis to begin the 2022 season. Alldred was selected to the 40-man roster and promoted to the major leagues for the first time by the Pirates on May 11, 2022. He made his MLB debut the next day, striking out one batter over one scoreless inning in relief in a 4–0 loss to the Cincinnati Reds at PNC Park. On May 24, Alldred was designated for assignment by the Pirates. He cleared waivers and was sent outright to Indianapolis on May 28. In 42 games for the Indians, he recorded a 4.07 ERA with 62 strikeouts across 66 1/3 innings.

Alldred returned to Indianapolis for the 2023 season. In 31 appearances (17 starts), he compiled an 8–8 record and 5.20 ERA with 98 strikeouts across 105 2/3 innings pitched. Alldred made 9 starts for Indianapolis in 2024, struggling to a 6.88 ERA with 34 strikeouts across 34 innings pitched. He was released by the Pirates organization on May 28, 2024.

=== Kia Tigers ===
On May 29, 2024, Alldred signed with the Kia Tigers of the KBO League as a temporary replacement for Wil Crowe, who had suffered an elbow injury. In 9 starts for Kia, he posted a 3–2 record and 4.53 ERA with 52 strikeouts across 43 2/3 innings pitched. Alldred was waived by the Tigers on August 5.

=== Saraperos de Saltillo ===
On March 26, 2025, Alldred signed with the Saraperos de Saltillo of the Mexican League. In 27 appearances (12 starts) for Saltillo, Alldred struggled to a 2-4 record and 6.02 ERA with 54 strikeouts across 58 1/3 innings pitched.

=== Uni-President Lions ===
On August 11, 2025, Alldred signed with the Uni-President Lions of the Chinese Professional Baseball League. In seven starts for the Lions, he compiled a 3–1 record and 2.08 ERA with 30 strikeouts over 39 innings of work. Alldred became a free agent following the season.

=== Saraperos de Saltillo (second stint) ===
On April 14, 2026, Alldred signed with the Saraperos de Saltillo of the Mexican League. In five starts, he posted a 0–3 record with a 13.80 ERA, 11 strikeouts, and seven walks across 15 innings pitched. On May 15, Alldred was waived by Saltillo.

=== Tecolotes de los Dos Laredos ===
On May 17, 2026, Alldred was claimed off waivers by the Tecolotes de los Dos Laredos of the Mexican League. In five appearances for the Tecolotes, he posted an 0–4 record with a 6.10 ERA, 18 strikeouts, and 14 walks across 20 2/3 innings pitched. Alldred was released by the team on June 15.
