= Yerry De Los Santos =

Dominican baseball player (born 1997)

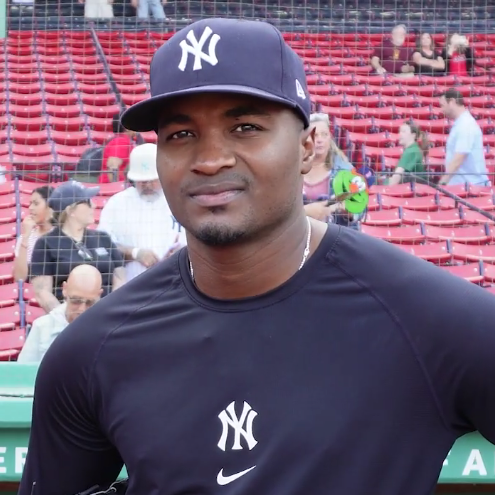
- De Los Santos with the New York Yankees in 2025

New York Yankees – No. 73
- Pitcher
- Born: December 12, 1997 (age 28); Samaná, Dominican Republic
- Bats: Right Throws: Right

MLB debut
- May 25, 2022, for the Pittsburgh Pirates

MLB statistics (through 2026 season)
- Win–loss record: 2–5
- Earned run average: 3.43
- Strikeouts: 89
- Stats at Baseball Reference

Teams
- Pittsburgh Pirates (2022–2023); New York Yankees (2025–present)

Yerry Paulino De Los Santos (born December 12, 1997) is a Dominican professional baseball pitcher for the New York Yankees of Major League Baseball (MLB). He signed with the Pittsburgh Pirates in 2014 as an international free agent. and made his MLB debut with them in 2022.

== Career ==
=== Pittsburgh Pirates ===
De Los Santos signed with the Pittsburgh Pirates organization in July 2014 for a $100,000 signing bonus as an international free agent from the Dominican Republic. He pitched for the Dominican Summer League Pirates in 2015, and had Tommy John surgery and missed the 2016 minor league season.

In May 2019, he was promoted to the Greensboro Grasshoppers. He did not play in a game in 2020 due to the cancellation of the minor league season because of the COVID-19 pandemic.

In 2021, De Los Santos pitched for the Altoona Curve and Indianapolis Indians, while missing most of the season with a forearm injury. Following the 2021 season, he was eligible for free agency, but re-signed with the Pirates for the 2022 season.

On April 13, 2022, De Los Santos combined with Chase De Jong and Austin Brice to throw a no-hitter for the Indianapolis Indians of the Triple-A International League. On May 22, the Pirates selected De Los Santos's contract, promoting him to the major leagues for the first time. He made his MLB debut on May 25. On August 12, De Los Santos was placed on the 60-day injured list with a right shoulder latissimus dorsi muscle strain. In 26 appearances for Pittsburgh in his rookie campaign, De Los Santos registered an 0–3 record and 4.91 ERA with 26 strikeouts and 3 saves in 25 2/3 innings pitched.

De Los Santos was optioned to Triple-A Indianapolis to begin the 2023 season. In 22 games for the Pirates, he logged a 3.33 ERA with 18 strikeouts in 24 1/3 innings of work. Following the season on November 2, 2023, De Los Santos was removed from the 40–man roster and sent outright to Triple-A Indianapolis. He elected free agency on November 6.

=== New York Yankees ===
On November 21, 2023, De Los Santos signed a minor league contract with the New York Yankees organization. He made 51 appearances for the Triple–A Scranton/Wilkes-Barre RailRiders in 2024, compiling a 4.12 ERA with 55 strikeouts and 4 saves across 59 innings pitched. On November 3, 2024, the Yankees added De Los Santos to their 40–man roster to prevent him from reaching minor league free agency.

De Los Santos was optioned to Triple-A Scranton/Wilkes-Barre to begin the 2025 season. He made 25 appearances for New York during the regular season, compiling an 0–1 record and 3.28 ERA with 28 strikeouts across 35 2/3 innings pitched.

De Los Santos was again optioned to Triple-A Scranton/Wilkes-Barre to begin the 2026 season.

== See also ==
- List of Major League Baseball players from the Dominican Republic
