= Cal Mitchell =

American baseball player (born 1999)

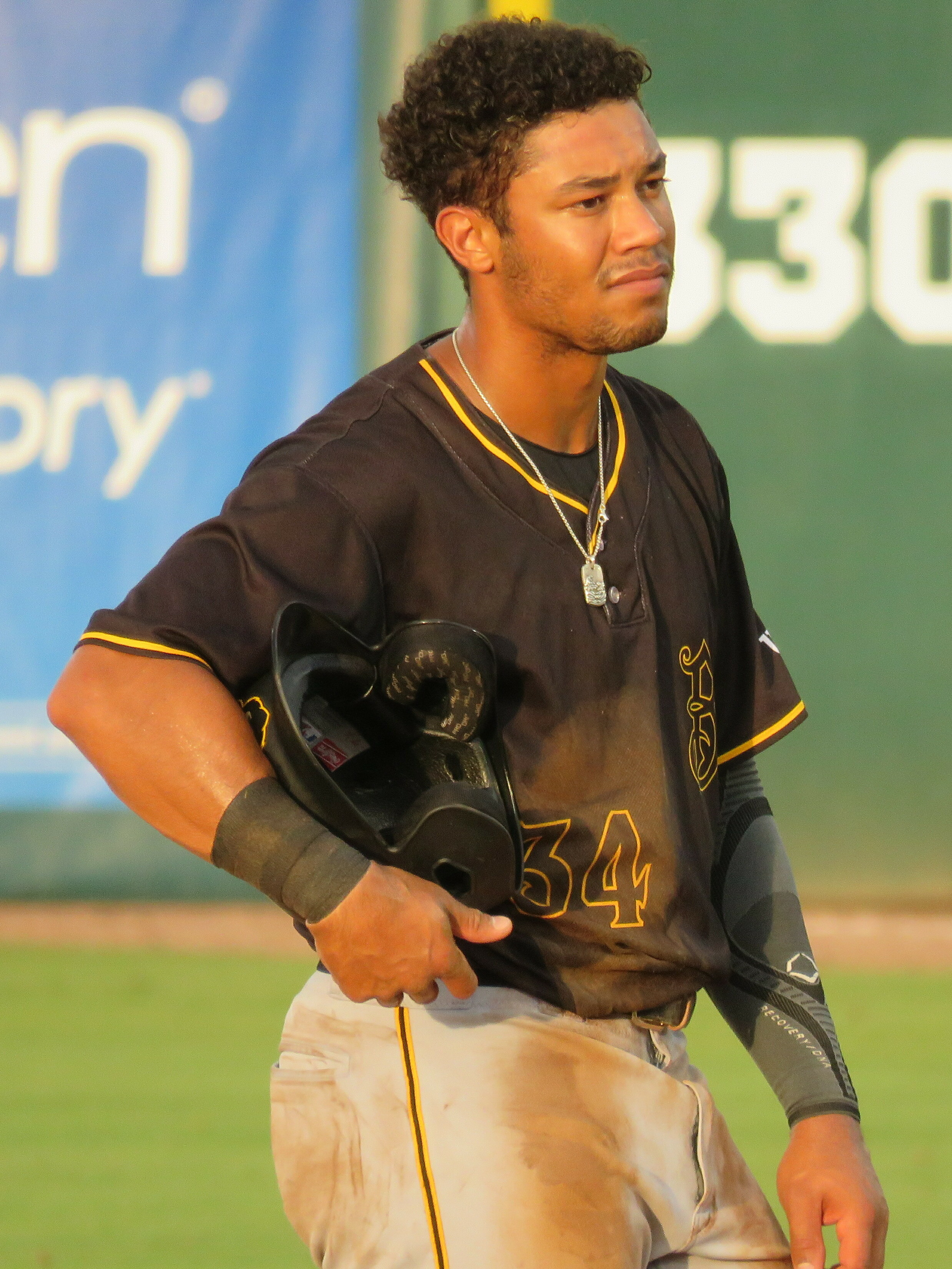
- Mitchell with the Bradenton Marauders in 2019

Piratas de Campeche – No. 24
- Outfielder
- Born: March 8, 1999 (age 27); San Diego, California, U.S.
- Bats: Left Throws: Left

MLB debut
- May 24, 2022, for the Pittsburgh Pirates

MLB statistics (through 2023 season)
- Batting average: .222
- Home runs: 5
- Runs batted in: 17
- Stats at Baseball Reference

Teams
- Pittsburgh Pirates (2022–2023)

Calvin David Mitchell (born March 8, 1999) is an American professional baseball outfielder for the Piratas de Campeche of the Mexican League. He has previously played in Major League Baseball (MLB) for the Pittsburgh Pirates.

== Amateur career ==
Mitchell graduated from Rancho Bernardo High School in San Diego, California, where he played four years of varsity baseball. As a junior in 2016, he batted .371 with 12 home runs and 41 RBIs. In 2017, as a senior, he batted .369 with 11 home runs and 34 RBIs. For his high school career, he batted .337 with 29 home runs and 120 RBIs. Mitchell committed to the University of San Diego to play college baseball for the San Diego Toreros baseball team. However, the Pittsburgh Pirates selected him in the second round (50th overall) of the 2017 Major League Baseball draft and he signed for a $1.4 million signing bonus, forgoing his commitment to USD.

== Professional career ==
=== Pittsburgh Pirates ===
After signing, Mitchell made his professional debut with the Rookie-level Gulf Coast League Pirates. He spent all of his first professional season there, batting .245 with two home runs and 20 RBIs in 43 games. He spent 2018 with the West Virginia Power of the Single–A South Atlantic League. He was named the SAL Player of the Week for April 16–22 after hitting .467 with one home run, nine RBIs, and a 1.233 OPS, and also earned All-Star honors. Over 119 games for the Power, he hit .280 with ten home runs and 65 RBIs. He spent 2019 with the Bradenton Marauders of the High–A Florida State League, with whom he was named an All-Star. Over 118 games, he slashed .251/.304/.406 with 15 home runs and 64 RBIs. He did not play a minor league game in 2020 since the season was cancelled due to the COVID-19 pandemic. Mitchell was assigned to the Altoona Curve of the Double-A Northeast for a majority of the 2021 season, slashing .280/.330/.429 with 12 home runs, 61 RBIs, and 19 doubles over 108 games. Following the end of Altoona's season in mid-September, he was promoted to the Indianapolis Indians of the Triple-A East with whom he played seven games. He returned to the Indians to begin the 2022 season.

On May 24, 2022, the Pirates selected Mitchell's contract and promoted him to the major leagues. He made his MLB debut that night as their starting right fielder, going one-for-four and recording his first MLB hit and RBI with a single off of Kyle Freeland in a 2–1 loss to the Colorado Rockies at PNC Park. He hit his first MLB home run on June 5, 2022, in a game against the Arizona Diamondbacks. After Miles Mikolas of the St. Louis Cardinals had pitched 8 2/3 no-hit innings in a game against the Pirates on June 14, 2022, Mitchell laced a ground rule double with two strikes in the count to break up the no-hitter.

Mitchell was optioned to Triple-A Indianapolis to begin the 2023 season. In 74 games, he batted .264/.338/.426 with 9 home runs, 53 RBI, and 6 stolen bases. Mitchell played in two games for the Pirates, going hitless with one walk in four at–bats before being designated for assignment by Pittsburgh on September 1, 2023. He cleared waivers and was sent outright to Triple–A Indianapolis on September 5. Mitchell elected free agency following the season on November 6.

=== San Diego Padres ===
On November 15, 2023, Mitchell signed a minor league contract with the San Diego Padres that included an invitation to spring training. He played in 122 games for the Triple–A El Paso Chihuahuas in 2024, slashing .277/.359/.512 with 22 home runs, 70 RBI, and 12 stolen bases. Mitchell elected free agency following the season on November 4, 2024.

=== Chicago White Sox ===
On December 1, 2024, Mitchell signed a minor league contract with the Chicago White Sox. He began 2025 with the Triple-A Charlotte Knights, going 3-for-27 (.111) with one stolen base over 10 appearances. Mitchell was released by the White Sox organization on April 26, 2025.

=== San Francisco Giants ===
On April 29, 2025, Mitchell signed a minor league contract with the San Francisco Giants. In 40 appearances for the Double-A Richmond Flying Squirrels, he batted .169/.244/.268 with three home runs, seven RBI, and one stolen base. On June 21, Mitchell was released by the Giants organization.

=== Piratas de Campeche ===
On July 11, 2025, Mitchell signed with the Piratas de Campeche of the Mexican League. In 19 games, he hit .197/.326/.437 with four home runs, 13 RBI, and two stolen bases. In 2026, Mitchell played in 94 games and batted .322 with 14 home runs and 59 RBI.
