= Chase De Jong =

American baseball player (born 1993)

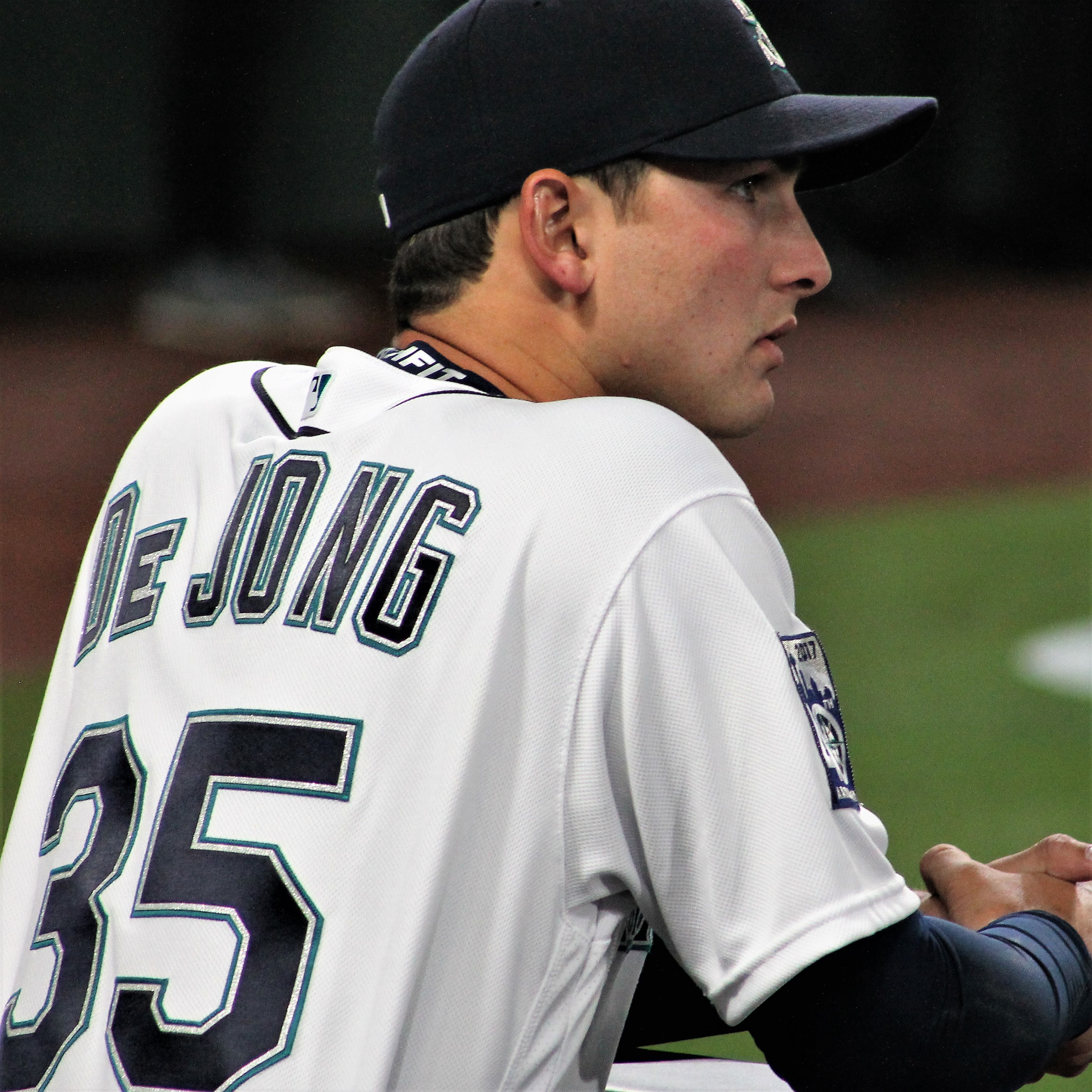
- De Jong with the Seattle Mariners
- Pitcher
- Born: December 29, 1993 (age 31); Long Beach, California, U.S.
- Batted: Left Threw: Right

MLB debut
- April 5, 2017, for the Seattle Mariners

Last MLB appearance
- June 6, 2023, for the Pittsburgh Pirates

MLB statistics
- Win–loss record: 8–12
- Earned run average: 5.42
- Strikeouts: 140
- Stats at Baseball Reference

Teams
- Seattle Mariners (2017); Minnesota Twins (2018–2019); Houston Astros (2020); Pittsburgh Pirates (2021–2023)

Chase Louis De Jong (born December 29, 1993) is an American former professional baseball pitcher. De Jong was drafted by the Toronto Blue Jays in the 2nd round of the 2012 Major League Baseball draft. He has previously played in Major League Baseball (MLB) for the Seattle Mariners, Minnesota Twins, Houston Astros, and Pittsburgh Pirates. He throws a fastball, cut fastball, slider, curve, and change-up.

== Career ==
=== Toronto Blue Jays ===
De Jong was drafted by the Toronto Blue Jays out of Woodrow Wilson High School in Long Beach, California in the second round of the 2012 Major League Baseball draft. After signing for a bonus of $620,300, De Jong was assigned to the Gulf Coast League Blue Jays and made 6 relief appearances for the team, posting a 1–0 record with a 1.50 earned run average and 15 strikeouts over 12 innings, with only 1 walk. He was promoted to the Bluefield Blue Jays prior to the start of the 2013 season, and made 13 appearances for the team, 10 of which were starts. In 2013, De Jong posted a 2–3 record with an ERA of 3.05 and 66 strikeouts over 56 innings pitched. In 2014, he was promoted to the Class-A Lansing Lugnuts. De Jong made 23 appearances for Lansing in 2014, 21 of which were starts, and compiled a record of 1–6 with a 4.82 ERA and 73 strikeouts in 97 innings pitched. De Jong started the 2015 season in Lansing, making 14 starts and posting a 7–4 record, 3.13 ERA, and 77 strikeouts in 86 1/3 innings.

=== Los Angeles Dodgers ===
DeJong was traded to the Los Angeles Dodgers on July 2, 2015, for cash. In 11 appearances (10 starts) for the Rancho Cucamonga Quakes he was 4–3 with a 4.86 ERA. He struck out six in six innings for the Quakes in the opening game of the California League championship series. The Dodgers invited him to major league spring training in 2016. To start the 2016 season, he was promoted to the Double-A Tulsa Drillers of the Texas League, where he was selected to the mid-season all-star team. In Tulsa, he developed a cut fastball under the tutelage of pitching coach Bill Simas. After the season, he was named to the postseason all-star team and honored as the Texas League Pitcher of the Year. In 25 starts for the Drillers he was 14–5 with a 2.86 ERA, earning him a late season promotion to the Triple-A Oklahoma City Dodgers, where he allowed one run in 5 1/3 innings in his one start. The Dodgers added him to their 40-man roster after the season.

=== Seattle Mariners ===
On March 1, 2017, he was traded to the Seattle Mariners in exchange for minor leaguers Drew Jackson and Aneurys Zabala. The Mariners added him to the major league roster on April 3, 2017. He made his major league debut against the Houston Astros at Minute Maid Park in Houston on April 5, 2017, gaining the loss by giving up a three-run home run to George Springer in bottom of the 13th inning in the Astros' 5–3 victory over the Mariners. After the game, De Jong was optioned to the Tacoma Rainiers of the Pacific Coast League after the Mariners activated Dillon Overton from the paternity list.

=== Minnesota Twins ===
On July 30, 2018, De Jong was traded to the Minnesota Twins along with infielder Ryan Costello for pitcher Zach Duke. He was called up in September of that year. On January 30, 2019, De Jong was designated for assignment after the signing of Martin Perez was made official. He was outrighted on February 6. DeJong had his contract selected on April 6, 2019. After a game against the Mets where he gave up 4 earned runs, 1 home run, and 3 walks in 1 inning pitched, he was sent back down to Triple-A Rochester. DeJong was outrighted off the roster on April 26, 2019.

=== Sugar Land Skeeters ===
On July 22, 2019, De Jong signed with the Sugar Land Skeeters of the Atlantic League of Professional Baseball. He became a free agent following the season. On April 1, 2020, De Jong re-signed with the Skeeters for the 2020 season.

=== Houston Astros ===
On August 3, 2020, the Houston Astros acquired the rights to De Jong from the Sugar Land Skeeters. On August 23, 2020, De Jong was selected to the active roster. In 3 appearances for the Astros, De Jong struggled to a 14.73 ERA. On October 30, De Jong elected free agency.

=== Pittsburgh Pirates ===
On January 5, 2021, De Jong signed a minor league contract with the Pittsburgh Pirates organization. On May 30, De Jong was selected to the active roster. He made his season debut as the Pirates’ starting pitcher against the Colorado Rockies, going 5.0 innings while only allowing 1 run. De Jong was placed on the injured list with left knee inflammation on July 20 after being hit in the knee by a line drive off the bat of Arizona Diamondbacks outfielder David Peralta. On July 28, De Jong underwent season-ending surgery on the injury. In 9 starts for Pittsburgh, he has worked to a 1-4 record and 5.77 ERA with 39 strikeouts in 43.2 innings pitched. On November 5, 2021, De Jong was outrighted off of the 40-man roster and elected free agency the next day.

On March 16, 2022, De Jong signed a minor league contract to return to the Pirates organization. Assigned to the Indianapolis Indians of the Triple-A International League to begin the year, he combined with Austin Brice and Yerry De Los Santos to throw a no-hitter on April 14. On April 22, the Pirates selected De Jong's contract. On August 30, De Jong earned his first career save after closing out a game against the Milwaukee Brewers with 1 2/3 scoreless innings. He made 42 appearances out of the bullpen for Pittsburgh, registering a 6-3 record and 2.64 ERA with 59 strikeouts and 1 save in 71.2 innings of work.

De Jong began the 2023 season working out of the Pirates' bullpen, but struggled to a 10.61 ERA with 5 strikeouts in 5 games. On May 9, 2023, De Jong was designated for assignment following the promotion of Josh Palacios. He cleared waivers and was sent outright to Triple-A Indianapolis on May 11. In 5 outings for Indianapolis, he recorded a 2.84 ERA and 1.89 WHIP and 7:5 K:BB. De Jong was selected back to the active roster on June 4. He allowed six runs on five hits and a walk in two innings of work before he was designated for assignment again on June 9 after Canaan Smith-Njigba was added to the roster. He again cleared waivers and was sent outright to Triple–A on June 11. On October 2, De Jong elected free agency.

== Personal life ==
On December 1, 2018, De Jong married Christina Langer, daughter of golfer Bernhard Langer.

He is the cousin of former Blue Jays pitcher Jordan De Jong.
