= Austin Brice =

American baseball player (born 1992)

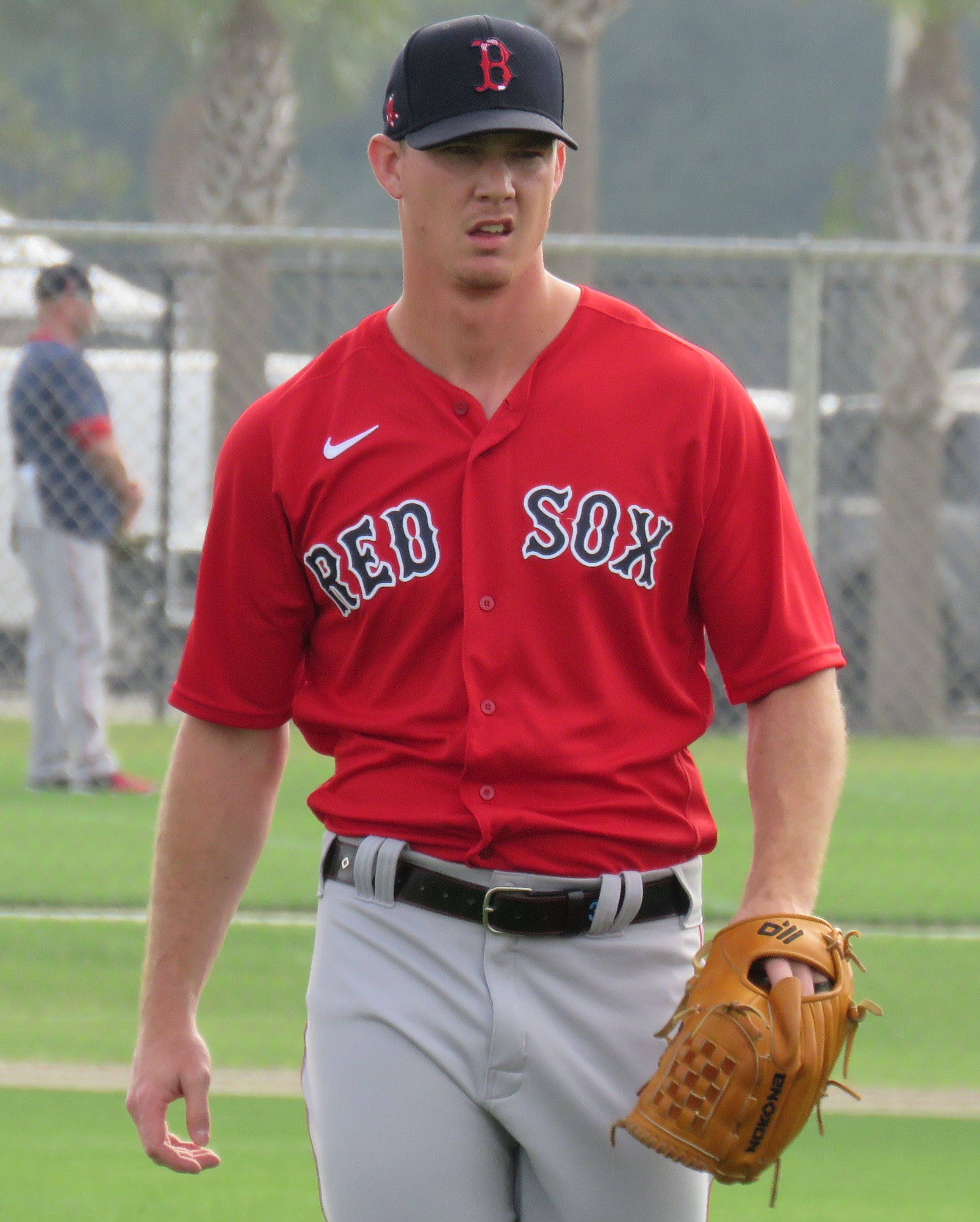
- Brice with the Red Sox in 2020
- Pitcher
- Born: June 19, 1992 (age 34); British Hong Kong
- Batted: Right Threw: Right

MLB debut
- August 12, 2016, for the Miami Marlins

Last MLB appearance
- August 16, 2022, for the Pittsburgh Pirates

MLB statistics
- Win–loss record: 4–4
- Earned run average: 5.12
- Strikeouts: 160
- Stats at Baseball Reference

Teams
- Miami Marlins (2016); Cincinnati Reds (2017–2018); Miami Marlins (2019); Boston Red Sox (2020–2021); Pittsburgh Pirates (2022)

Austin Robert Brice (born June 19, 1992) is a Hong Kong-born American former professional baseball pitcher. He played in Major League Baseball (MLB) for the Miami Marlins, Cincinnati Reds, Boston Red Sox, and Pittsburgh Pirates.

He is the first (and as of the 2025 season, only) Hong Kong–born player to appear in the major leagues.

== Career ==
=== Miami Marlins ===
Brice was drafted by the Florida Marlins in the ninth round of the 2010 Major League Baseball draft out of Northwood High School in Pittsboro, North Carolina. He had committed to play college baseball at Appalachian State University, but chose to sign with the Marlins. He made his professional debut that season with the Gulf Coast Marlins and also played 2011 there. In 2012 (when he was 8–6 with a 4.35 ERA) and 2013 (when he was 8–11 with a 5.73 ERA), he played for the Greensboro Grasshoppers.

Brice played for the Jupiter Hammerheads in 2014 and Jacksonville Suns in 2015. The Marlins added him to their 40-man roster after the 2015 season. He started the 2016 with Jacksonville and was promoted to the New Orleans Zephyrs.

Brice was called up to the majors for the first time on August 9, 2016. With Miami in 2016, he was 0–1 with a 7.07 ERA and one hold.

=== Cincinnati Reds ===
On January 19, 2017, the Marlins traded Brice, Luis Castillo, and Isaiah White to the Cincinnati Reds for Dan Straily. In 2017 with the Reds, he was 0–0 with a 4.96 ERA in 22 appearances. In 2018 with the Reds, Brice made 33 appearances, compiling a 2–3 record with 5.79 ERA and 32 strikeouts in 37 1/3 innings pitched.

On November 2, 2018, Brice was claimed off waivers by the Los Angeles Angels. On December 29, 2018, Brice was designated for assignment by the Angels to make room for catcher Jonathan Lucroy. Brice was claimed off waivers by the Baltimore Orioles on January 4, 2019. On January 28, 2019, Brice was designated for assignment.

=== Miami Marlins (second stint) ===
On February 4, 2019, Brice was claimed off waivers by the Marlins. During the 2019 season with the Marlins, he recorded a 1–0 record with 3.43 ERA in 36 appearances, with 46 strikeouts in 44 2/3 innings. On January 7, 2020, the Marlins designated Brice for assignment.

=== Boston Red Sox ===
On January 10, 2020, the Boston Red Sox acquired Brice from the Marlins in exchange for minor league second baseman Angeudis Santos. On July 24, Brice made his Red Sox debut against the Baltimore Orioles, entering the game in relief of Nathan Eovaldi in the seventh inning. Brice was on the injured list for two weeks during September with a right lat strain. Overall with the 2020 Red Sox, Brice appeared in 21 games (one start), compiling a 1–0 record with 5.95 ERA and 25 strikeouts in 19 2/3 innings pitched.

In early December 2020, Brice and the Red Sox reached a one-year deal for the 2021 season. Brice recorded a 6.94 ERA in 12 appearances before being designated for assignment on May 21, 2021. He was outrighted to the Triple-A Worcester Red Sox on May 25. On July 10, Brice was selected to the active roster. He gave up a run in two innings of work in his only appearance before being designated for assignment on July 16. Brice was again outrighted to Worcester on July 17. In 26 appearances (two starts) with Worcester, he had a 3.27 ERA while striking out 34 batters in 33 innings. On October 14, Brice elected free agency.

=== Pittsburgh Pirates ===
On March 16, 2022, Brice signed a minor league deal with the Pittsburgh Pirates. On April 13, 2022, Brice combined with Chase De Jong and Yerry De Los Santos to throw a no-hitter for the Indianapolis Indians of the Triple-A International League. He had his contract selected on June 24. He was designated for assignment on July 6 and sent outright to Triple-A. On August 12, his contract was selected and after 2 appearances, Brice was designated for assignment on August 17. He cleared waivers and was again outrighted to Indianapolis on August 20. Brice elected free agency following the season on October 6.

=== Arizona Diamondbacks ===
On December 1, 2022, Brice signed a minor league deal with the Arizona Diamondbacks organization. He was assigned to the Triple-A Reno Aces to begin the 2023 season. Brice struggled immensely to the tune of a 24.00 ERA with 3 strikeouts across 5 appearances for Reno before he was released on April 17, 2023.

=== Minnesota Twins ===
On May 20, 2023, Brice signed a minor league contract with the Minnesota Twins organization. In 32 relief appearances for the Triple–A St. Paul Saints, he posted a 5.54 ERA with 40 strikeouts across 37 1/3 innings of work. Brice elected free agency following the season on November 6.

=== Philadelphia Phillies ===
On February 18, 2024, Brice signed a minor league contract with the Philadelphia Phillies. In two appearances for the Triple–A Lehigh Valley IronPigs, he struggled to a 7.71 ERA with two strikeouts across 2 1/3 innings pitched. Brice was released by the Phillies organization on April 7.

=== Minnesota Twins (second stint) ===
On May 9, 2024, Brice signed a minor league contract with the Minnesota Twins organization. After posting a 1.08 ERA in 7 games for the Double–A Wichita Wind Surge, he was promoted to the Triple–A St. Paul Saints, where he struggled immensely to a 35.31 ERA with 8 strikeouts across 8 games. Brice retired from professional baseball on July 15.

== Personal life ==
Brice was born in British Hong Kong as his father worked a lot internationally; Brice grew up in Pittsboro, North Carolina.

== See also ==
- List of countries with their first Major League Baseball player
