= Zach Thompson (baseball) =

American baseball player (born 1993)

- Pitcher
- Born: October 23, 1993 (age 32); Burleson, Texas, U.S.
- Batted: Right Threw: Right

MLB debut
- June 7, 2021, for the Miami Marlins

Last MLB appearance
- April 15, 2025, for the Atlanta Braves

MLB statistics
- Win–loss record: 6–17
- Earned run average: 4.36
- Strikeouts: 159
- Stats at Baseball Reference

Teams
- Miami Marlins (2021); Pittsburgh Pirates (2022); Atlanta Braves (2025)

Zachary Ryan Thompson (born October 23, 1993) is an American former professional baseball pitcher. He played in Major League Baseball (MLB) for the Miami Marlins, Pittsburgh Pirates, and Atlanta Braves. He was drafted by the Chicago White Sox in the 5th round of the 2014 MLB draft.

== Career ==
=== Chicago White Sox ===
Thompson was drafted by the Pittsburgh Pirates in the 48th round of the 2011 Major League Baseball draft but did not sign and attended the University of Texas at Arlington. He was then drafted by the Chicago White Sox in the 5th round of the 2014 Major League Baseball draft and signed. He made his professional debut with the rookie ball Great Falls Voyagers.

In 2015, Thompson played for the Single-A Kannapolis Intimidators, recording a 3–8 record and 4.44 ERA in 16 appearances. The next year, he split the season between the High-A Winston-Salem Dash and Kannapolis, accumulating a 9–8 record and 3.77 ERA in 140 2/3 innings of work. He remained with Winston-Salem for the 2017 season, pitching to a 2–7 record and 5.50 ERA with 73 strikeouts. In 2018, Thompson split the season between the Double-A Birmingham Barons and Winston-Salem, posting a 6–1 record and stellar 1.55 ERA in 43 games.

In 2019, Thompson split the year between the Triple-A Charlotte Knights and Birmingham, pitching to a 5–2 record and 5.23 ERA with 84 strikeouts in 75 2/3 innings pitched. Thompson did not play in a game in 2020 due to the cancellation of the minor league season because of the COVID-19 pandemic. On November 2, 2020, he elected free agency.

=== Miami Marlins ===
On November 23, 2020, Thompson signed a minor league contract with the Miami Marlins organization that included an invitation to spring training. He was assigned to the Triple-A Jacksonville Jumbo Shrimp to begin the season.

On June 5, 2021, Thompson was selected to the 40-man roster and promoted to the major leagues for the first time. He made his MLB debut on June 7 as the starting pitcher against the Boston Red Sox, taking the loss after allowing two runs on four hits in three innings; he recorded his first major league strikeout against Kiké Hernández. Thompson made 26 appearances (14 starts) for Miami during his rookie campaign, compiling a 3-7 record and 3.24 ERA with 66 strikeouts over 75 innings of work.

=== Pittsburgh Pirates ===
On November 29, 2021, the Marlins traded Thompson, Connor Scott, and Kyle Nicolas to the Pittsburgh Pirates in exchange for Jacob Stallings. Thompson made 29 appearances (22 starts) for Pittsburgh in 2022, posting a 3-10 record and 5.18 ERA with 90 strikeouts in 121 2/3 innings pitched.

On January 5, 2023, Thompson was designated for assignment by Pittsburgh after the signing of Rich Hill was made official.

=== Toronto Blue Jays ===
On January 10, 2023, Thompson was traded to the Toronto Blue Jays in exchange for Chavez Young. Thompson was optioned to the Triple-A Buffalo Bisons to begin the 2023 season. In 11 starts for Buffalo, Thompson struggled to a 2–4 record and 6.89 ERA with 31 strikeouts in 47 innings of work. On June 6, he was designated for assignment by Toronto following the promotion of Bowden Francis. He cleared waivers and was sent outright to Buffalo on June 8. Thompson elected free agency following the season on November 6.

Thompson underwent surgery to repair a partial flexor tear in October 2023, and missed the entirety of the 2024 campaign as a result.

=== Atlanta Braves ===
On October 19, 2024, Thompson signed a minor league contract with the Atlanta Braves. On April 1, 2025, the Braves selected Thompson's contract, adding him to their active roster. He made two scoreless appearances for Atlanta, striking out three over 3 2/3 innings pitched. On April 28, Thompson was designated for assignment by Atlanta. On April 30, he cleared waivers and rejected an outright assignment to the Triple-A Gwinnett Stripers, instead electing free agency. The next day, Thompson re-signed with Atlanta on a minor league contract. In 17 appearances (six starts) split between Gwinnett and the Double-A Columbus Clingstones, he struggled to a 2-4 record and 6.57 ERA with 29 strikeouts and one save over 37 innings of work. Thompson was released by the Braves organization on August 18.

== Personal life ==
Thompson and his wife, Ashlyn, married in December 2017 and have one daughter together.
