= 2021 Pittsburgh Pirates season =

2021 Pittsburgh Pirates
- League: National League
- Division: Central
- Ballpark: PNC Park
- City: Pittsburgh, Pennsylvania (Note: From 1882–1906, the team played in Allegheny, Pennsylvania, which became annexed by Pittsburgh as the North Side in 1907.)
- Record: 61–101 (.377)
- Divisional place: 5th
- Owners: Bob Nutting
- General managers: Ben Cherington
- Managers: Derek Shelton
- Television: AT&T SportsNet Pittsburgh
- Radio: KDKA-FM; Pittsburgh Pirates Radio Network; Greg Brown, Joe Block, Bob Walk, John Wehner, Michael McKenry, Matt Capps, Kevin Young, Neil Walker
- Stats: ESPN.com; Baseball Reference

The 2021 Pittsburgh Pirates season was the franchise's 140th season overall, 135th season as a member of the National League, and 21st season at PNC Park. The Pirates suffered another heavily losing season, finishing last in the National League Central with a 0.377 winning percentage, the second-worst in the National League. They were 34 games behind the division-winning Brewers. One rare highlight from the season was winning a series of games against the playoff-bound Giants, including a 10–2 steamrolling of them at Oracle Park.

The Pirates had the first overall pick in the 2021 Major League Baseball draft after their weak 2020 season, drafting catcher Henry Davis. Sports journalists suspect that the team was tanking again in the 2021 season for a high draft spot in the 2022 Major League Baseball draft.

== Regular season ==
=== National League Central ===
NL Central
Team	W	L	Pct.	GB	Home	Road
Milwaukee Brewers	95	67	.586	—	45‍–‍36	50‍–‍31
St. Louis Cardinals	90	72	.556	5	45‍–‍36	45‍–‍36
Cincinnati Reds	83	79	.512	12	44‍–‍37	39‍–‍42
Chicago Cubs	71	91	.438	24	39‍–‍42	32‍–‍49
Pittsburgh Pirates	61	101	.377	34	37‍–‍44	24‍–‍57

=== National League playoff standings ===
Division leaders
Team	W	L	Pct.
San Francisco Giants	107	55	.660
Milwaukee Brewers	95	67	.586
Atlanta Braves	88	73	.547

Wild Card teams (Top 2 teams qualify for postseason)
Team	W	L	Pct.	GB
Los Angeles Dodgers	106	56	.654	+16
St. Louis Cardinals	90	72	.556	—
Cincinnati Reds	83	79	.512	7
Philadelphia Phillies	82	80	.506	8
San Diego Padres	79	83	.488	11
New York Mets	77	85	.475	13
Colorado Rockies	74	87	.460	15½
Chicago Cubs	71	91	.438	19
Miami Marlins	67	95	.414	23
Washington Nationals	65	97	.401	25
Pittsburgh Pirates	61	101	.377	29
Arizona Diamondbacks	52	110	.321	38

=== Record vs. opponents ===
2021 National League record Source: MLB Standings Grid – 2021
Team	AZ	ATL	CHC	CIN	COL	LAD	MIA	MIL	NYM	PHI	PIT	SD	SF	STL	WSH	AL
Arizona	—	3–4	2–4	5–1	9–10	3–16	2–5	1–6	1–5	4–3	4–2	8–11	2–17	1–6	3–4	4–16
Atlanta	4–3	—	5–2	4–3	2–4	2–4	11–8	3–3	10–9	10–9	4–3	4–2	3–3	6–1	14–5	6–14
Chicago	4–2	2–5	—	8–11	3–3	4–3	1–5	4–15	4–3	2–5	14–5	5–1	1–6	9–10	4–3	6–14
Cincinnati	1–5	3–4	11–8	—	5–2	3–3	5–2	9–10	3–3	4–2	13–6	1–6	1–6	10–9	5–2	9–11
Colorado	10–9	4–2	3–3	2–5	—	6–13	4–2	2–5	2–5	5–2	4–2	11–8	4–15	3–4	4–2	10–10
Los Angeles	16–3	4–2	3–4	3–3	13–6	—	3–4	4–3	6–1	4–2	6–0	12–7	9–10	4–3	7–0	12–8
Miami	5–2	8–11	5–1	2–5	2–4	4–3	—	3–3	9–10	10–9	2–5	3–4	3–4	0–6	8–11	3–17
Milwaukee	6–1	3–3	15–4	10–9	5–2	3–4	3–3	—	4–2	2–5	14–5	5–2	4–3	8–11	5–1	8–12
New York	5–1	9–10	3–4	3–3	5–2	1–6	10–9	2–4	—	9–10	3–4	4–3	1–5	2–5	11–8	9–11
Philadelphia	3–4	9–10	5–2	2–4	2–5	2–4	9–10	5–2	10–9	—	4–3	4–2	2–4	4–3	13–6	8–12
Pittsburgh	2–4	3–4	5–14	6–13	2–4	0–6	5–2	5–14	4–3	3–4	—	3–4	4–3	7–12	2–4	10–10
San Diego	11–8	2–4	1–5	6–1	8–11	7–12	4–3	2–5	3–4	2–4	4–3	—	8–11	3–3	4–3	14–6
San Francisco	17–2	3–3	6–1	6–1	15–4	10–9	4–3	3–4	5–1	4–2	3–4	11–8	—	2–4	5–2	13–7
St. Louis	6–1	1–6	10–9	9–10	4–3	3–4	6–0	11–8	5–2	3–4	12–7	3–3	4–2	—	2–4	11–9
Washington	4–3	5–14	3–4	2–5	2–4	0–7	11–8	1–5	8–11	6–13	4–2	3–4	2–5	4–2	—	10–10

=== Detailed records ===
National League
Opponent	W	L	WP	RS	RA
NL East
Atlanta Braves	3	4	0.429	25	53
Miami Marlins	5	2	0.714	36	25
New York Mets	4	3	0.571	37	39
Philadelphia Phillies	3	4	0.429	32	40
Washington Nationals	2	4	0.333	20	30
Total	17	17	0.500	150	187
NL Central
Chicago Cubs	5	14	0.263	77	91
Cincinnati Reds	6	13	0.316	69	130
Milwaukee Brewers	5	14	0.263	61	112
**Pittsburgh Pirates**					
St. Louis Cardinals	7	12	0.368	70	95
Total	23	53	0.303	277	428
NL West
Arizona Diamondbacks	2	4	0.333	24	33
Colorado Rockies	2	4	0.333	16	20
Los Angeles Dodgers	0	6	0.000	11	28
San Diego Padres	3	4	0.429	22	26
San Francisco Giants	4	3	0.571	30	27
Total	11	21	0.344	103	134
American League
Chicago White Sox	1	3	0.250	14	17
Cleveland Indians	2	1	0.667	18	15
Detroit Tigers	4	2	0.667	19	19
Kansas City Royals	1	3	0.250	16	27
Minnesota Twins	2	1	0.667	12	6
Total	10	10	0.500	79	84
Season Total	61	101	0.377	609	833

Month	Games	Won	Lost	Win %	RS	RA
April	25	12	13	0.480	97	113
May	28	8	20	0.286	81	143
June	26	9	17	0.346	99	120
July	25	11	14	0.440	103	143
August	28	8	20	0.286	92	153
September	27	11	16	0.407	117	147
October	3	2	1	0.667	20	14
Total	162	61	101	0.377	609	833

	Games	Won	Lost	Win %	RS	RA
Home	81	37	44	0.457	330	396
Away	81	24	57	0.296	279	437
Total	162	61	101	0.377	609	833

=== Game log ===
2021 Game Log: 61–101 (Home: 37–44; Away: 24–57)
**April: 12–13 (Home: 5–5; Away: 7–8)**

#	Date	Opponent	Score	Win	Loss	Save	Attendance	Record	Streak
1	April 1	@ Cubs	5–3	**Howard** (1–0)	Hendricks (0–1)	**Rodríguez** (1)	10,343	1–0	W1
2	April 3	@ Cubs	1–5	Arrieta (1–0)	**Anderson** (0–1)	—	10,343	1–1	L1
3	April 4	@ Cubs	3–4	Davies (1–0)	**Keller** (0–1)	Kimbrel (1)	10,343	1–2	L2
4	April 5	@ Reds	3–5	Doolittle (1–0)	**Howard** (1–1)	Garrett (1)	9,097	1–3	L3
5	April 6	@ Reds	1–14	Miley (1–0)	**Cahill** (0–1)	—	11,093	1–4	L4
6	April 7	@ Reds	4–11	Castillo (1–0)	**Kuhl** (0–1)	—	11,463	1–5	L5
7	April 8	Cubs	2–4	Arrieta (2–0)	**Anderson** (0–2)	Kimbrel (2)	7,749	1–6	L6
8	April 10	Cubs	8–2	**Keller** (1–1)	Davies (1–1)	—	7,052	2–6	W1
9	April 11	Cubs	7–1	**Brubaker** (1–0)	Williams (1–1)	—	6,851	3–6	W2
10	April 12	Padres	2–6	Darvish (1–0)	**Oviedo** (0–1)	—	4,068	3–7	L1
11	April 13	Padres	8–4	**Stratton** (1–0)	Crismatt (0–1)	—	4,814	4–7	W1
12	April 14	Padres	5–1	**Anderson** (1–2)	Musgrove (2–1)	—	5,228	5–7	W2
13	April 15	Padres	3–8	Paddack (1–1)	**Keller** (1–2)	Stammen (1)	4,023	5–8	L1
14	April 16	@ Brewers	6–1	**Brubaker** (2–0)	Houser (1–2)	—	11,967	6–8	W1
15	April 17	@ Brewers	1–7	Anderson (2–1)	**Cahill** (0–2)	—	12,038	6–9	L1
16	April 18	@ Brewers	6–5 (10)	**Rodríguez** (1–0)	Feyereisen (0–1)	—	11,772	7–9	W1
—	April 20	@ Tigers	Postponed (snow; makeup April 21)						
17	April 21 (1)	@ Tigers	3–2 (7)	**Anderson** (2–2)	Fulmer (1–1)	**Rodríguez** (2)	7,356	8–9	W2
18	April 21 (2)	@ Tigers	2–5 (7)	Turnbull (1–0)	**Yajure** (0–1)	Soto (2)	7,461	8–10	L1
19	April 22	@ Tigers	4–2	**Howard** (2–1)	Cisnero (0–1)	**Rodríguez** (3)	7,314	9–10	W1
20	April 23	@ Twins	0–2	Happ (1–0)	**Brubaker** (2–1)	Rogers (1)	9,541	9–11	L1
21	April 24	@ Twins	6–2	**Cahill** (1–2)	Pineda (1–1)	—	9,718	10–11	W1
22	April 25	@ Twins	6–2	**Holmes** (1–0)	Shoemaker (1–2)	—	9,396	11–11	W2
23	April 27	Royals	2–1	**Underwood Jr.** (1–0)	Junis (1–1)	**Rodríguez** (4)	5,510	12–11	W3
24	April 28	Royals	6–9	Zimmer (2–0)	**Keller** (1–3)	Staumont (3)	4,226	12–12	L1
25	April 30	Cardinals	3–7	Gant (2–2)	**Brubaker** (2–2)	—	5,953	12–13	L2

**May: 8–20 (Home: 5–10; Away: 3–10)**

#	Date	Opponent	Score	Win	Loss	Save	Attendance	Record	Streak
26	May 1	Cardinals	5–12	Flaherty (5–0)	**Cahill** (1–3)	—	7,331	12–14	L3
27	May 2	Cardinals	0–3	Martínez (2–4)	**Crowe** (0–1)	Reyes (7)	7,343	12–15	L4
28	May 3	@ Padres	0–2	Hill (2–2)	**Anderson** (2–3)	Melancon (10)	15,250	12–16	L5
29	May 4	@ Padres	2–1	**Keller** (2–3)	Weathers (1–1)	**Rodríguez** (5)	15,250	13–16	W1
30	May 5	@ Padres	2–4	Stammen (2–1)	**Underwood Jr.** (1–1)	Melancon (11)	15,250	13–17	L1
31	May 7	@ Cubs	2–3	Davies (2–2)	**Cahill** (1–4)	Brothers (1)	10,343	13–18	L2
32	May 8	@ Cubs	2–3	Thompson (1–0)	**Howard** (2–2)	Kimbrel (6)	10,343	13–19	L3
33	May 9	@ Cubs	6–5	**Anderson** (3–3)	Hendricks (2–4)	**Rodríguez** (6)	10,343	14–19	W1
34	May 10	Reds	1–14	Mahle (2–1)	**Keller** (2–4)	—	4,065	14–20	L1
35	May 11	Reds	7–2	**Brubaker** (3–2)	Hoffman (2–3)	—	4,049	15–20	W1
36	May 12	Reds	1–5 (10)	Sims (2–1)	**Underwood Jr.** (1–2)	—	4,515	15–21	L1
37	May 13	Giants	1–3	DeSclafani (3–1)	**Crowe** (0–2)	Rogers (3)	4,099	15–22	L2
38	May 14	Giants	3–2 (11)	**Oviedo** (1–1)	Baragar (2–1)	—	6,743	16–22	W1
39	May 15	Giants	8–6	**Rodríguez** (2–0)	McGee (1–1)	—	7,833	17–22	W2
40	May 16	Giants	1–4	Wood (5–0)	**Keller** (2–5)	Rogers (4)	7,356	17–23	L1
41	May 18	@ Cardinals	2–5	Gant (3–3)	**Brubaker** (3–3)	Reyes (12)	14,005	17–24	L2
42	May 19	@ Cardinals	5–8	Flaherty (8–0)	**Cahill** (1–5)	Reyes (13)	14,677	17–25	L3
43	May 20	@ Braves	6–4 (10)	**Rodríguez** (3–0)	Webb (1–2)	—	21,430	18–25	W1
44	May 21	@ Braves	1–20	Anderson (4–1)	**Anderson** (3–4)	—	37,545	18–26	L1
45	May 22	@ Braves	1–6	Wilson (2–2)	**Keller** (2–6)	—	40,068	18–27	L2
46	May 23	@ Braves	1–7	Fried (2–2)	**Brubaker** (3–4)	—	39,874	18–28	L3
47	May 25	Cubs	3–4	Arrieta (5–4)	**Ponce** (0–1)	Kimbrel (10)	6,750	18–29	L4
48	May 26	Cubs	1–4	Williams (3–2)	**Crowe** (0–3)	Kimbrel (11)	5,660	18–30	L5
49	May 27	Cubs	3–5	Hendricks (5–4)	**Anderson** (3–5)	Tepera (1)	7,202	18–31	L6
—	May 28	Rockies	Postponed (rain; makeup May 29)						
50	May 29 (1)	Rockies	7–0 (7)	**Brubaker** (4–4)	Gray (4–5)	—	5,279	19–31	W1
51	May 29 (2)	Rockies	4–0 (7)	**Keller** (3–6)	Gomber (3–5)	—	7,183	20–31	W2
52	May 30	Rockies	3–4	Bard (3–3)	**Rodríguez** (3–1)	—	7,917	20–32	L1
53	May 31	@ Royals	3–7	Minor (4–2)	**Kuhl** (0–2)	—	12,604	20–33	L2

**June: 9–17 (Home: 6–6; Away: 3–11)**

#	Date	Opponent	Score	Win	Loss	Save	Attendance	Record	Streak
54	June 1	@ Royals	5–10	Singer (3–4)	**Crowe** (0–4)	—	10,333	20–34	L3
55	June 3	Marlins	5–3	**Crick** (1–0)	Floro (2–3)	**Rodríguez** (7)	4,192	21–34	W1
56	June 4	Marlins	9–2	**Underwood Jr.** (2–2)	Poteet (2–2)	**Stratton** (1)	8,044	22–34	W2
57	June 5	Marlins	8–7 (12)	**Holmes** (2–0)	Cimber (1–2)	—	8,714	23–34	W3
58	June 6	Marlins	1–3	Alcántara (3–5)	**Kuhl** (0–3)	García (10)	5,477	23–35	L1
59	June 8	Dodgers	3–5	Buehler (5–0)	**Brubaker** (4–5)	Jansen (13)	9,047	23–36	L2
60	June 9	Dodgers	1–2	González (3–0)	**Anderson** (3–6)	Jansen (14)	10,957	23–37	L3
61	June 10	Dodgers	3–6 (8)	Urías (9–2)	**Keller** (3–7)	Bickford (1)	9,396	23–38	L4
62	June 11	@ Brewers	4–7	Woodruff (5–2)	**Holmes** (2–1)	Hader (15)	17,678	23–39	L5
63	June 12	@ Brewers	4–7	Richards (1–0)	**Kuhl** (0–4)	Hader (16)	20,126	23–40	L6
64	June 13	@ Brewers	2–5	Suter (8–3)	**Bednar** (0–1)	Hader (17)	20,545	23–41	L7
65	June 14	@ Nationals	2–3	Finnegan (3–2)	**Holmes** (2–2)	Hand (12)	14,859	23–42	L8
66	June 15	@ Nationals	1–8	Corbin (4–5)	**Anderson** (3–7)	—	16,886	23–43	L9
67	June 16	@ Nationals	1–3	Espino (1–2)	**De Jong** (0–1)	Hand (13)	16,781	23–44	L10
68	June 18	Indians	11–10	**Kuhl** (1–4)	Mejía (1–2)	**Rodríguez** (8)	16,965	24–44	W1
69	June 19	Indians	6–3	**Stratton** (2–0)	Shaw (1–2)	—	16,830	25–44	W2
70	June 20	Indians	1–2	Maton (2–0)	**Brubaker** (4–6)	Karinchak (8)	16,582	25–45	L1
71	June 22	White Sox	6–3	**Bednar** (1–1)	Crochet (2–4)	**Rodríguez** (9)	9,847	26–45	W1
72	June 23	White Sox	3–4	Cease (6–3)	**De Jong** (0–2)	Hendriks (19)	10,406	26–46	L1
73	June 24	@ Cardinals	8–2	**Kuhl** (2–4)	Martínez (3–9)	—	33,254	27–46	W1
74	June 25	@ Cardinals	5–4	**Crowe** (1–4)	Woodford (1–1)	**Rodríguez** (10)	34,812	28–46	W2
75	June 26	@ Cardinals	1–3	Wainwright (6–5)	**Brubaker** (4–7)	Reyes (18)	33,058	28–47	L1
76	June 27	@ Cardinals	7–2	**Kranick** (1–0)	Oviedo (0–4)	—	25,163	29–47	W1
77	June 28	@ Rockies	0–2	Freeland (1–2)	**Anderson** (3–8)	Bard (11)	32,092	29–48	L1
78	June 29	@ Rockies	0–8	Márquez (7–6)	**De Jong** (0–3)	—	27,915	29–49	L2
79	June 30	@ Rockies	2–6	Gray (5–6)	**Kuhl** (2–5)	—	20,270	29–50	L3

**July: 11–14 (Home: 7–8; Away: 4–6)**

#	Date	Opponent	Score	Win	Loss	Save	Attendance	Record	Streak
80	July 1	Brewers	2–7	Burnes (4–4)	**Crowe** (1–5)	—	11,074	29–51	L4
81	July 2	Brewers	2–7	Houser (5–5)	**Brubaker** (4–8)	—	15,421	29–52	L5
82	July 3	Brewers	2–11	Lauer (3–3)	**Ponce** (0–2)	—	17,451	29–53	L6
83	July 4	Brewers	2–0	**Anderson** (4–8)	Peralta (7–3)	**Rodríguez** (11)	12,527	30–53	W1
84	July 5	Braves	11–1	**De Jong** (1–3)	Fried (5–5)	—	11,600	31–53	W2
85	July 6	Braves	2–1	**Rodríguez** (4–1)	Matzek (0–3)	—	10,844	32–53	W3
86	July 7	Braves	3–14	Smyly (7–3)	**Crick** (1–1)	—	10,094	32–54	L1
—	July 8	@ Mets	Postponed (rain; makeup July 10)						
87	July 9	@ Mets	4–13	Loup (3–0)	**Brubaker** (4–9)	—	20,350	32–55	L2
88	July 10 (1)	@ Mets	6–2 (7)	**Anderson** (5–8)	Stroman (6–7)	—	N/A	33–55	W1
89	July 10 (2)	@ Mets	2–4 (7)	Familia (4–1)	**Kranick** (1–1)	Díaz (19)	31,924	33–56	L1
90	July 11	@ Mets	6–5	**Bednar** (2–1)	Díaz (3–3)	**Rodríguez** (12)	26,420	34–56	W1
**91st All-Star Game in Denver, CO**
91	July 16	Mets	4–1	**Kuhl** (3–5)	Stroman (6–8)	**Rodríguez** (13)	18,119	35–56	W2
92	July 17	Mets	9–7	**Holmes** (3–2)	Díaz (3–4)	—	27,222	36–56	W3
93	July 18	Mets	6–7	Familia (5–1)	**Rodríguez** (4–2)	May (2)	17,837	36–57	L1
94	July 19	@ Diamondbacks	2–4	Smith (3–6)	**De Jong** (1–4)	Soria (5)	9,173	36–58	L2
95	July 20	@ Diamondbacks	6–11	Bukauskas (2–2)	**Davis** (0–1)	—	7,283	36–59	L3
96	July 21	@ Diamondbacks	4–6	de Geus (2–0)	**Underwood Jr.** (2–3)	Soria (6)	7,863	36–60	L4
97	July 23	@ Giants	6–4	**Stratton** (3–0)	Leone (2–1)	**Rodríguez** (14)	26,579	37–60	W1
98	July 24	@ Giants	10–2	**Crowe** (2–5)	Gausman (9–4)	—	30,780	38–60	W2
99	July 25	@ Giants	1–6	Wood (9–3)	**Brubaker** (4–10)	—	30,303	38–61	L1
100	July 27	Brewers	0–9	Anderson (3–5)	**Oviedo** (1–2)	—	10,618	38–62	L2
101	July 28	Brewers	3–7	Houser (7–5)	**Kranick** (1–2)	—	10,204	38–63	L3
102	July 29	Brewers	0–12	Peralta (8–3)	**Kuhl** (3–6)	—	10,503	38–64	L4
103	July 30	Phillies	7–0	**Crowe** (3–5)	Velasquez (3–6)	—	20,591	39–64	W1
104	July 31	Phillies	3–2	**Stratton** (4–0)	Alvarado (6–1)	—	32,071	40–64	W2

**August: 8–20 (Home: 5–9; Away: 3–11)**

#	Date	Opponent	Score	Win	Loss	Save	Attendance	Record	Streak
105	August 1	Phillies	4–15	Gibson (7–3)	**Keller** (3–8)	—	17,875	40–65	L1
106	August 2	@ Brewers	2–6	Lauer (4–4)	**Wilson** (2–4)	Boxberger (4)	23,563	40–66	L2
107	August 3	@ Brewers	8–5 (10)	**Bednar** (3–1)	Hardy (0–1)	—	24,902	41–66	W1
108	August 4	@ Brewers	2–4	Suter (10–5)	**Keller** (0–1)	Williams (1)	28,003	41–67	L1
109	August 5	@ Reds	4–7	Gray (4–6)	**Crowe** (3–6)	Givens (1)	19,393	41–68	L2
110	August 6	@ Reds	0–10	Miley (9–4)	**Brubaker** (4–11)	—	27,804	41–69	L3
111	August 7	@ Reds	3–11	Gutiérrez (7–3)	**Keller** (3–9)	—	31,297	41–70	L4
112	August 8	@ Reds	2–3	Mahle (9–3)	**Wilson** (2–5)	Givens (2)	23,740	41–71	L5
113	August 10	Cardinals	1–4	Happ (6–6)	**Brault** (0–1)	Reyes (26)	10,056	41–72	L6
114	August 11	Cardinals	0–4	Wainwright (11–6)	**Crowe** (3–7)	—	8,548	41–73	L7
115	August 12	Cardinals	6–7	McFarland (2–0)	**Brubaker** (4–12)	Reyes (27)	8,676	41–74	L8
—	August 13	Brewers	Postponed (rain; makeup August 14)						
116	August 14 (1)	Brewers	14–4 (7)	**Shreve** (1–0)	Anderson (4–6)	—	16,991	42–74	W1
117	August 14 (2)	Brewers	0–6 (7)	Boxberger (5–3)	**Keller** (3–10)	—	24,081	42–75	L1
118	August 15	Brewers	1–2	Suter (12–5)	**Peters** (0–1)	Hader (23)	12,001	42–76	L2
119	August 16	@ Dodgers	1–2	Treinen (3–5)	**Shreve** (1–1)	Jansen (24)	48,005	42–77	L3
120	August 17	@ Dodgers	3–4	Knebel (2–0)	**Ponce** (0–3)	Jansen (25)	53,114	42–78	L4
121	August 18	@ Dodgers	0–9	White (1–1)	**Brubaker** (4–13)	—	52,140	42–79	L5
122	August 20	@ Cardinals	4–0	**Keller** (4–10)	Mikolas (0–1)	—	28,406	43–79	W1
123	August 21	@ Cardinals	5–4	**Shreve** (2–1)	Cabrera (2–4)	**Bednar** (1)	30,205	44–79	W2
124	August 22	@ Cardinals	0–3	Wainwright (12–7)	**Brault** (0–2)	Reyes (28)	34,431	44–80	L1
125	August 23	Diamondbacks	6–5	**Banda** (2–0)	Ramirez (0–1)	**Bednar** (2)	8,596	45–80	W1
126	August 24	Diamondbacks	4–2	**Brubaker** (5–13)	Bumgarner (7–8)	**Stratton** (2)	8,478	46–80	W2
127	August 25	Diamondbacks	2–5	de Geus (3–2)	**Banda** (2–1)	Clippard (5)	8,357	46–81	L1
128	August 26	Cardinals	11–7	**Kuhl** (4–6)	Cabrera (2–5)	—	8,618	47–81	W1
129	August 27	Cardinals	3–4	Happ (8–6)	**Peters** (0–2)	Reyes (29)	12,662	47–82	L1
130	August 28	Cardinals	0–13	Wainwright (13–7)	**Brault** (0–3)	—	20,043	47–83	L2
131	August 29	Cardinals	4–3	**Stratton** (5–0)	Reyes (5–7)	—	10,290	48–83	W1
132	August 31	@ White Sox	2–4	Kopech (4–2)	**Wilson** (2–6)	Hendriks (30)	19,221	48–84	L1

**September/October: 13–17 (Home: 9–6; Away: 4–11)**

#	Date	Opponent	Score	Win	Loss	Save	Attendance	Record	Streak
133	September 1	@ White Sox	3–6	Rodón (11–5)	**Kranick** (1–3)	Hendriks (31)	19,231	48–85	L2
134	September 2	@ Cubs	5–6 (11)	Heuer (6–2)	**Howard** (2–3)	—	26,963	48–86	L3
135	September 3	@ Cubs	5–6	Megill (1–0)	**Miller** (0–1)	Wick (2)	24,441	48–87	L4
136	September 4	@ Cubs	6–7	Effross (1–0)	**Stratton** (5–1)	—	30,020	48–88	L5
137	September 5	@ Cubs	8–11	Alzolay (5–13)	**Howard** (2–4)	Wick (3)	30,155	48–89	L6
138	September 6	Tigers	6–3	**Shreve** (3–1)	Funkhouser (6–3)	**Bednar** (3)	11,141	49–89	W1
139	September 7	Tigers	3–2	**Howard** (3–4)	Lange (0–2)	**Stratton** (3)	8,329	50–89	W2
140	September 8	Tigers	1–5	Hutchison (1–1)	**Keller** (4–11)	—	8,382	50–90	L1
141	September 10	Nationals	4–3	**Kuhl** (5–6)	Murphy (0–2)	—	11,808	51–90	W1
142	September 11	Nationals	10–7	**Keller** (1–1)	Baldonado (0–1)	**Stratton** (4)	17,993	52–90	W2
143	September 12	Nationals	2–6	Corbin (8–14)	**Wilson** (2–7)	Finnegan (9)	9,714	52–91	L1
144	September 14	Reds	6–5	**Peters** (1–2)	Miley (12–6)	**Stratton** (5)	8,896	53–91	W1
145	September 15	Reds	5–4	**Stratton** (6–1)	Givens (3–3)	—	9,320	54–91	W2
146	September 16	Reds	0–1	Mahle (12–5)	**Ponce** (0–4)	Givens (8)	9,102	54–92	L1
147	September 17	@ Marlins	2–1	**Crowe** (4–7)	Hernández (1–2)	**Stratton** (6)	7,884	55–92	W1
148	September 18	@ Marlins	6–3	**Wilson** (3–7)	Cabrera (0–2)	—	12,300	56–92	W2
149	September 19	@ Marlins	5–6 (10)	Okert (2–1)	**Kuhl** (5–7)	—	9,870	56–93	L1
150	September 20	@ Reds	5–9	Cessa (5–2)	**Ponce** (0–5)	—	17,086	56–94	L2
151	September 21	@ Reds	6–2	**Keller** (5–11)	Mahle (12–6)	—	9,475	57–94	W1
—	September 22	@ Reds	Postponed (rain, makeup September 27)						
152	September 23	@ Phillies	6–12	Nola (9–8)	**Banda** (2–2)	—	16,154	57–95	L1
153	September 24	@ Phillies	6–8	Neris (4–6)	**Shreve** (3–2)	Kennedy (26)	20,548	57–96	L2
154	September 25	@ Phillies	0–3	Suárez (7–5)	**Crowe** (4–8)	—	28,135	57–97	L3
155	September 26	@ Phillies	6–0	**Kranick** (2–3)	Crouse (0–1)	—	29,336	58–97	W1
156	September 27	@ Reds	1–13	Sanmartín (1–0)	**Overton** (0–1)	—	11,055	58–98	L1
157	September 28	Cubs	8–6	**De Los Santos** (2–1)	Morgan (1–1)	**Stratton** (7)	9,218	59–98	W1
158	September 29	Cubs	2–3	Morgan (2–1)	**Shreve** (3–3)	Heuer (2)	9,236	59–99	L1
159	September 30	Cubs	0–9	Steele (4–4)	**Yajure** (0–2)	—	10,152	59–100	L2
160	October 1	Reds	9–2	**Stratton** (7–1)	Garrett (0–4)	—	13,582	60–100	W1
161	October 2	Reds	8–6	**Mears** (1–0)	Santillan (1–3)	**Stratton** (8)	22,910	61–100	W2
162	October 3	Reds	3–6	Sanmartin (2–0)	**Ponce** (0–6)	—	13,011	61–101	L1

Legend: = Win = Loss = Postponement
Bold = Pirates team member

== Notable games ==
During the May 27 game against the Chicago Cubs, with Cubs catcher Willson Contreras on second base and Javier Báez at the plate with 2 outs, Baez hit a ground ball to third baseman Erik González, who made a wide throw to first baseman Will Craig. Instead of touching first, Craig decided to chase down Baez back to home plate. With Contreras coming home, Craig tried to toss the ball to catcher Michael Pérez. Contreras beat the throw and was able to score. With Baez going back to first, Perez tried to throw it to first, but Adam Frazier was late to cover the bag and the ball sailed into right field. Baez decided to head to second in which the Pirates tried to throw him out at second, but the throw was not in time. The play was ruled as 2 errors: one by Craig and the other by Perez.

== Roster ==
2021 Pittsburgh Pirates
Roster
Pitchers: 63 Tanner Anderson; 31 Tyler Anderson; 52 Anthony Banda; 51 David Bednar; 43 Steven Brault; 34 J. T. Brubaker; 35 Trevor Cahill; 59 Roansy Contreras; 30 Kyle Crick; 29 Wil Crowe; 62 Austin Davis; 37 Chase De Jong; 62 Enyel De Los Santos; 45 Michael Feliz; 32 Geoff Hartlieb; 52 Clay Holmes; 54 Sam Howard; 67 Kyle Keller; 23 Mitch Keller; 45 Max Kranick; 39 Chad Kuhl; 36 Nick Mears; 50 Shelby Miller; 41 Connor Overton; 57 Luis Oviedo; 38 Dillon Peters; 44 Cody Ponce; 62 Sean Poppen; 48 Richard Rodríguez; 55 Chasen Shreve; 66 Shea Spitzbarth; 46 Chris Stratton; 56 Duane Underwood Jr.; 48 Bryse Wilson; 89 Miguel Yajure	Catchers: 2 Taylor Davis; 5 Michael Pérez; 58 Jacob Stallings; Infielders: 64 Rodolfo Castro; 31 Michael Chavis; 38 Will Craig; 61 Oneil Cruz; 15 Wilmer Difo; 24 Phillip Evans; 26 Adam Frazier; 99 Todd Frazier; 2 Erik González; 13 Ke'Bryan Hayes; 19 Colin Moran; 27 Kevin Newman; 69 John Nogowski; 68 Hoy Park; 3 Cole Tucker; 45 Ildemaro Vargas	Outfielders: 6 Anthony Alford; 49 Dustin Fowler; 18 Ben Gamel; 14 Jared Oliva; 70 Hunter Owen; 25 Gregory Polanco; 10 Bryan Reynolds; 69 Troy Stokes Jr.; 60 Ka'ai Tom; 32 Yoshi Tsutsugo	Manager: 17 Derek Shelton; Coaches: 86 Heberto Andrade (coaching assistant); 16 Tarrik Brock (first base); 82 Jordan Comadena (bullpen catcher); 28 Joey Cora (third base); 41 Rick Eckstein (hitting); 12 Don Kelly (bench); 47 Oscar Marin (pitching); 88 Christian Marrero (assistant hitting); 87 Justin Meccage (bullpen); 85 Mike Rabelo (major league field coordinator); 53 Glenn Sherlock (coach)

== Player stats ==
=== Batting ===
Note: G = Games played; AB = At bats; R = Runs; H = Hits; 2B = Doubles; 3B = Triples; HR = Home runs; RBI = Runs batted in; SB = Stolen bases; BB = Walks; AVG = Batting average; SLG = Slugging average

Player	G	AB	R	H	2B	3B	HR	RBI	SB	BB	AVG	SLG
Bryan Reynolds	159	559	93	169	35	8	24	90	5	75	.302	.522
Kevin Newman	148	517	50	117	22	3	5	39	6	27	.226	.309
Adam Frazier	98	386	58	125	28	4	4	32	5	35	.324	.448
Jacob Stallings	112	374	38	92	20	1	8	53	0	49	.246	.369
Ke'Bryan Hayes	96	362	49	93	20	2	6	38	9	31	.257	.373
Gregory Polanco	107	336	38	70	12	2	11	36	14	36	.208	.354
Ben Gamel	111	326	42	83	17	3	8	26	3	48	.255	.399
Colin Moran	99	318	29	82	12	0	10	50	1	36	.258	.390
Erik González	71	220	17	51	7	1	2	21	2	8	.232	.300
Wilmer Difo	116	219	25	59	7	3	4	24	1	20	.269	.384
Phillip Evans	76	214	23	44	5	0	5	16	1	28	.206	.299
Michael Pérez	70	210	19	30	8	1	7	21	0	19	.143	.290
Anthony Alford	49	133	14	31	6	1	5	11	5	12	.233	.406
Hoy Park	44	127	16	25	5	2	3	14	1	18	.197	.339
Yoshi Tsutsugo	43	127	20	34	8	1	8	25	0	15	.268	.535
Cole Tucker	43	117	15	26	4	2	2	12	2	13	.222	.342
John Nogowski	33	111	12	29	7	0	1	14	0	11	.261	.351
Ka'ai Tom	39	92	9	14	2	1	2	11	1	17	.152	.261
Rodolfo Castro	31	86	9	17	2	0	5	8	0	6	.198	.395
Will Craig	18	60	5	13	2	0	1	3	0	5	.217	.300
Michael Chavis	12	42	4	15	3	0	1	5	0	0	.357	.500
Dustin Fowler	18	41	3	7	1	0	0	2	1	3	.171	.195
Jared Oliva	20	40	4	7	2	0	0	2	2	3	.175	.225
Todd Frazier	13	35	3	3	1	0	0	4	0	3	.086	.114
Troy Stokes Jr.	8	18	2	2	1	0	0	2	1	1	.111	.167
Ildemaro Vargas	7	13	0	1	0	0	0	1	0	0	.077	.077
Oneil Cruz	2	9	2	3	0	0	1	3	0	0	.333	.667
Taylor Davis	2	5	0	2	0	0	0	0	0	1	.400	.400
Hunter Owen	3	4	0	0	0	0	0	0	0	0	.000	.000
Pitcher totals	162	235	10	17	3	0	1	7	0	9	.072	.098
Team totals	162	5336	609	1261	240	35	124	570	60	529	.236	.364

=== Pitching ===
Note: W = Wins; L = Losses; ERA = Earned run average; G = Games pitched; GS = Games started SV = Saves; IP = Innings pitched; H = Hits allowed; R = Runs allowed; ER = Earned runs allowed; BB = Walks allowed; SO = Strikeouts

Player	W	L	ERA	G	GS	SV	IP	H	R	ER	BB	SO
JT Brubaker	5	13	5.36	24	24	0	124.1	123	75	74	38	129
Wil Crowe	4	8	5.48	26	25	0	116.2	126	75	71	57	111
Tyler Anderson	5	8	4.35	18	18	0	103.1	99	52	50	25	86
Mitch Keller	5	11	6.17	23	23	0	100.2	131	69	69	49	92
Chad Kuhl	5	7	4.82	28	14	0	80.1	73	50	43	42	75
Chris Stratton	7	1	3.63	68	0	8	79.1	70	34	32	33	86
Duane Underwood Jr.	2	3	4.33	43	0	0	72.2	77	40	35	27	65
David Bednar	3	1	2.23	61	0	3	60.2	40	15	15	19	77
Chasen Shreve	3	3	3.20	57	0	0	56.1	43	20	20	28	45
Sam Howard	3	4	5.60	54	1	0	45.0	34	29	28	32	60
Chase De Jong	1	4	5.77	9	9	0	43.2	49	28	28	19	39
Clay Holmes	3	2	4.93	44	0	0	42.0	35	24	23	25	44
Bryse Wilson	1	4	4.91	8	8	0	40.1	40	22	22	10	23
Max Kranick	2	3	6.28	9	9	0	38.2	47	28	27	19	32
Richard Rodríguez	4	2	2.82	37	0	14	38.1	27	12	12	5	33
Cody Ponce	0	6	7.04	15	2	0	38.1	56	34	30	11	36
Trevor Cahill	1	5	6.57	9	8	0	37.0	42	29	27	14	32
Kyle Keller	1	1	6.48	32	0	0	33.1	30	27	24	22	36
Luis Oviedo	1	2	8.80	22	1	0	29.2	33	32	29	26	31
Steven Brault	0	3	5.86	7	7	0	27.2	33	18	18	12	19
Dillon Peters	1	2	3.71	6	6	0	26.2	26	12	11	10	23
Anthony Banda	1	2	3.42	25	0	0	26.1	25	10	10	12	25
Kyle Crick	1	1	4.44	27	0	0	24.1	14	14	12	19	21
Nick Mears	1	0	5.01	30	0	0	23.1	25	14	13	13	23
Miguel Yajure	0	2	8.40	4	3	0	15.0	17	14	14	7	11
Shelby Miller	0	1	5.06	10	0	0	10.2	9	6	6	6	7
Austin Davis	0	1	5.59	10	0	0	9.2	6	7	6	5	11
Connor Overton	0	1	8.31	5	3	0	8.2	10	8	8	3	11
Michael Feliz	0	0	2.35	7	0	0	7.2	8	3	2	1	8
Enyel De Los Santos	1	0	4.91	7	0	0	7.1	9	4	4	4	6
Shea Spitzbarth	0	0	3.60	5	0	0	5.0	4	2	2	2	1
Tanner Anderson	0	0	3.60	1	0	0	5.0	5	2	2	0	1
Sean Poppen	0	0	7.71	3	0	0	4.2	11	7	4	2	4
Geoff Hartlieb	0	0	7.71	4	0	0	4.2	3	4	4	5	4
John Nogowski	0	0	15.00	3	0	0	3.0	8	5	5	0	0
Roansy Contreras	0	0	0.00	1	1	0	3.0	3	0	0	1	4
Wilmer Difo	0	0	36.00	2	0	0	2.0	9	8	8	3	1
Phillip Evans	0	0	0.00	1	0	0	1.0	0	0	0	0	0
Team totals	61	101	5.08	162	162	25	1396.1	1400	833	788	606	1312

== Farm system ==
Level	Team	League	Manager
Triple-A	Indianapolis Indians	Triple-A East	Brian Esposito
Double-A	Altoona Curve	Double-A Northeast	Miguel Perez
High-A	Greensboro Grasshoppers	High-A East	Kieran Mattison
Low-A	Bradenton Marauders	Low-A Southeast	Jonathan Johnston
Rookie	FCL Pirates Black	Florida Complex League	Stephen Morales
Rookie	FCL Pirates Gold	Florida Complex League	Gera Alvarez
Rookie	DSL Pirates 1	Dominican Summer League	Jose Mendez
Rookie	DSL Pirates 2	Dominican Summer League	Jose Mosquera
