= Kyle Keller =

Kyle Keller may refer to:

- Kyle Keller (basketball)
- Kyle Keller (baseball)
- Kyle Keller (racing driver)
