= Hunter Owen =

Hunter Owen may refer to:

- Hunter Owen (baseball) (born 1993), American baseball player
- Hunter Owen (pitcher) (born 2002), American baseball player
- Hunter Owen (EastEnders), a fictional character on British soap opera EastEnders
