= Rodolfo Castro =

Dominican baseball player (born 1999)

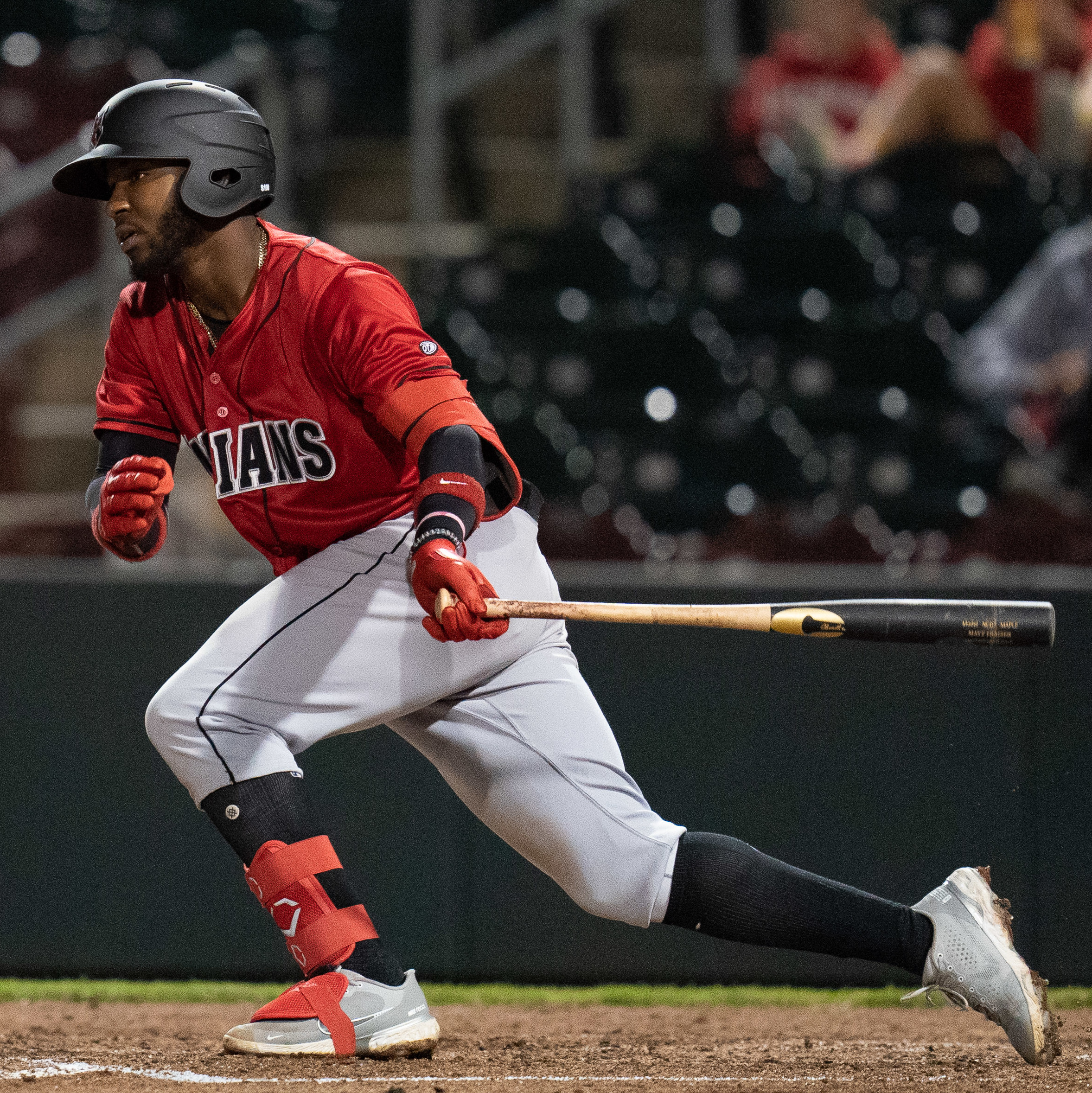
- Castro with the Indianapolis Indians in 2021

Free agent
- Second baseman / Shortstop/Third baseman
- Born: May 21, 1999 (age 27); Los Llanos, Dominican Republic
- Bats: Switch Throws: Right

Professional debut
- MLB: April 21, 2021, for the Pittsburgh Pirates
- NPB: March 28, 2026, for the Hokkaido Nippon-Ham Fighters

MLB statistics (through 2023 season)
- Batting average: .219
- Home runs: 22
- Runs batted in: 59

NPB statistics (through August 18, 2026)
- Batting average: .230
- Home runs: 8
- Runs batted in: 23
- Stats at Baseball Reference

Teams
- Pittsburgh Pirates (2021–2023); Philadelphia Phillies (2023); Hokkaido Nippon-Ham Fighters (2026–present)

Rodolfo Castro (born May 21, 1999) is a Dominican professional baseball infielder who is currently a free agent. He has previously played in Major League Baseball (MLB) for the Pittsburgh Pirates and Philadelphia Phillies, and in Nippon Professional Baseball for the Hokkaido Nippon-Ham Fighters.

== Career ==
=== Pittsburgh Pirates ===
==== Minor leagues ====
Castro signed with the Pittsburgh Pirates as an international free agent in 2015 for $150,000. He made his professional debut in 2016 with the Dominican Summer League Pirates, batting .271 with two home runs and 29 RBI over 56 games. In 2017, he played with the Gulf Coast League Pirates, slashing .277/.344/.479 with six home runs and 32 RBI, and in 2018, he played for the West Virginia Power, hitting .231 with 12 home runs and 50 RBI. Castro split the 2019 season with both the Greensboro Grasshoppers (with whom he was named a South Atlantic League All-Star) and the Bradenton Marauders, slashing a combined .242/.298/.456 with 19 home runs and 73 RBI.

==== Major leagues ====
On November 20, 2020, the Pirates added Castro to their 40-man roster to protect him from the Rule 5 draft. He was promoted to the major leagues for the first time on April 21, 2021. He made his MLB debut that day as the starting third baseman in the second game of a doubleheader against the Detroit Tigers. He was optioned to the Altoona Curve in mid-July, but was recalled shortly after the Pirates traded Adam Frazier, with Castro being Frazier's replacement at second base. On July 28, Castro hit two home runs against the Milwaukee Brewers. These were both his fourth and fifth major league home runs and his fourth and fifth major league hits, making him the first major league player since at least 1901 whose first five major league hits were all home runs. In 31 games during his rookie campaign, he batted .198/.258/.395 with 5 homers and 8 RBI.

In 2022, Castro played in 71 games for Pittsburgh, hitting .233/.299/.427 with 11 home runs and 27 RBI. He began the 2023 season with the Pirates, slashing .228/.317/.355 with 6 home runs and 22 RBI.

On August 9th, 2022, Castro was playing a game when he slid into third base, which would force a cellphone to slide out of his pocket. He was suspended for one game and assessed a fine for having his phone in his pocket during a game.

=== Philadelphia Phillies ===
On August 1, 2023, the Pirates traded Castro to the Philadelphia Phillies for pitcher Bailey Falter. In 14 games for the Phillies, he batted .100/.156/.100 with no home runs and two RBI.

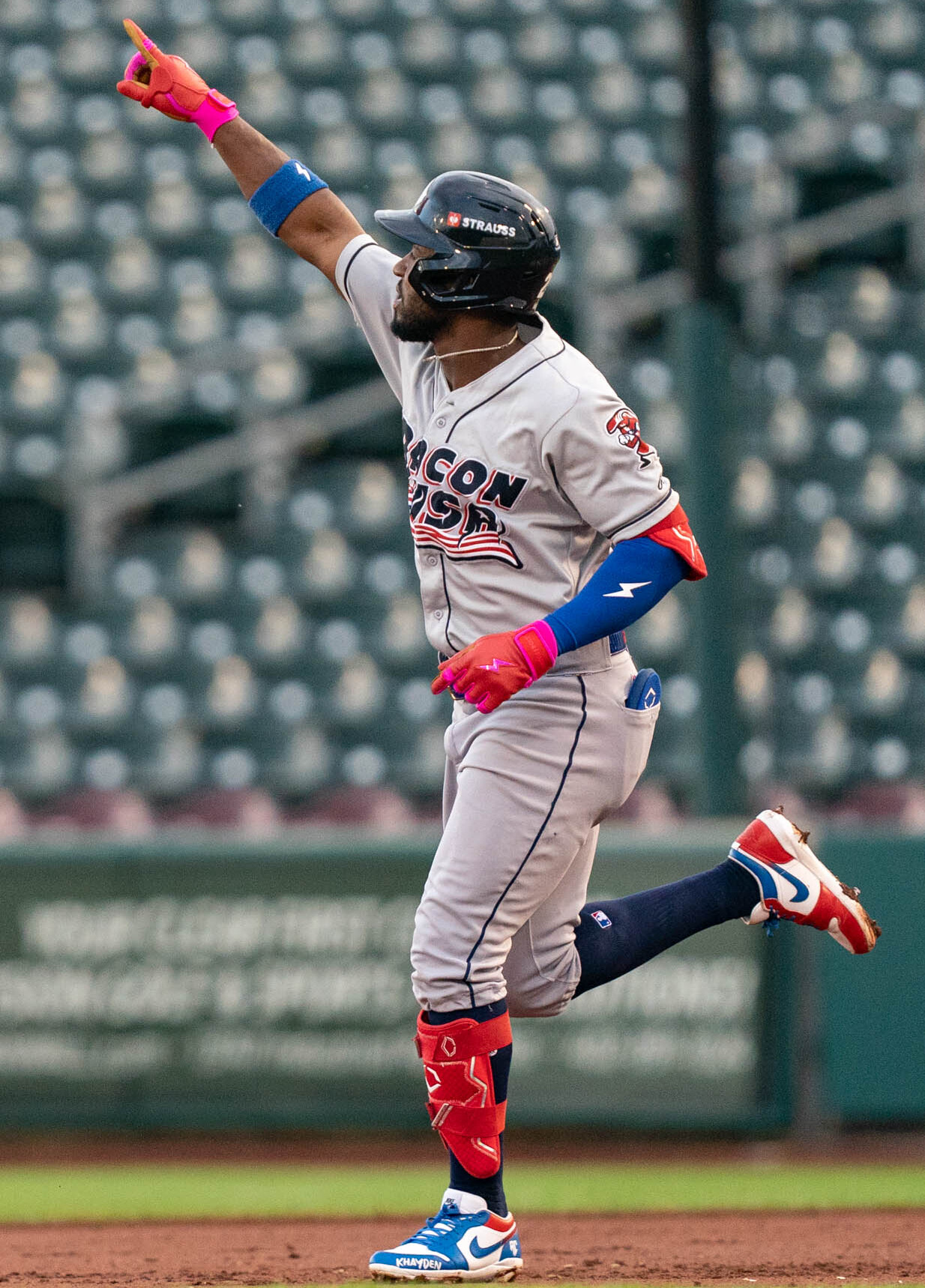
Castro with the Lehigh Valley IronPigs in 2025

Castro was optioned to the Triple-A Lehigh Valley IronPigs to begin the 2024 season. In 19 games split between Lehigh, the High-A Jersey Shore BlueClaws, Single-A Clearwater Threshers, and rookie-level Florida Complex League Phillies, he slashed a cumulative .221/.286/.351 with three home runs and nine RBI. On August 22, 2024, Castro was diagnosed with a torn ligament in his right thumb and was ruled out for the remainder of the season. On November 4, Castro was removed from the 40-man roster and sent outright to Lehigh Valley. Two days later, he elected free agency.

On November 21, 2024, Castro re-signed with the Phillies on a minor league contract. He made 133 appearances for Triple-A Lehigh Valley in 2025, batting .235/.324/.421 with 19 home runs, 82 RBI, and 18 stolen bases. Castro elected free agency following the season on November 6, 2025.

=== Toronto Blue Jays ===
On November 25, 2025, Castro signed a minor league contract with the Toronto Blue Jays. He was released by the Blue Jays organization on January 9, 2026.

=== Hokkaido Nippon-Ham Fighters ===
On January 13, 2026, Castro signed with the Hokkaido Nippon-Ham Fighters of Nippon Professional Baseball. He became a free agent after the 2026 season.
