= Troy Stokes Jr. =

American baseball player (born 1996)

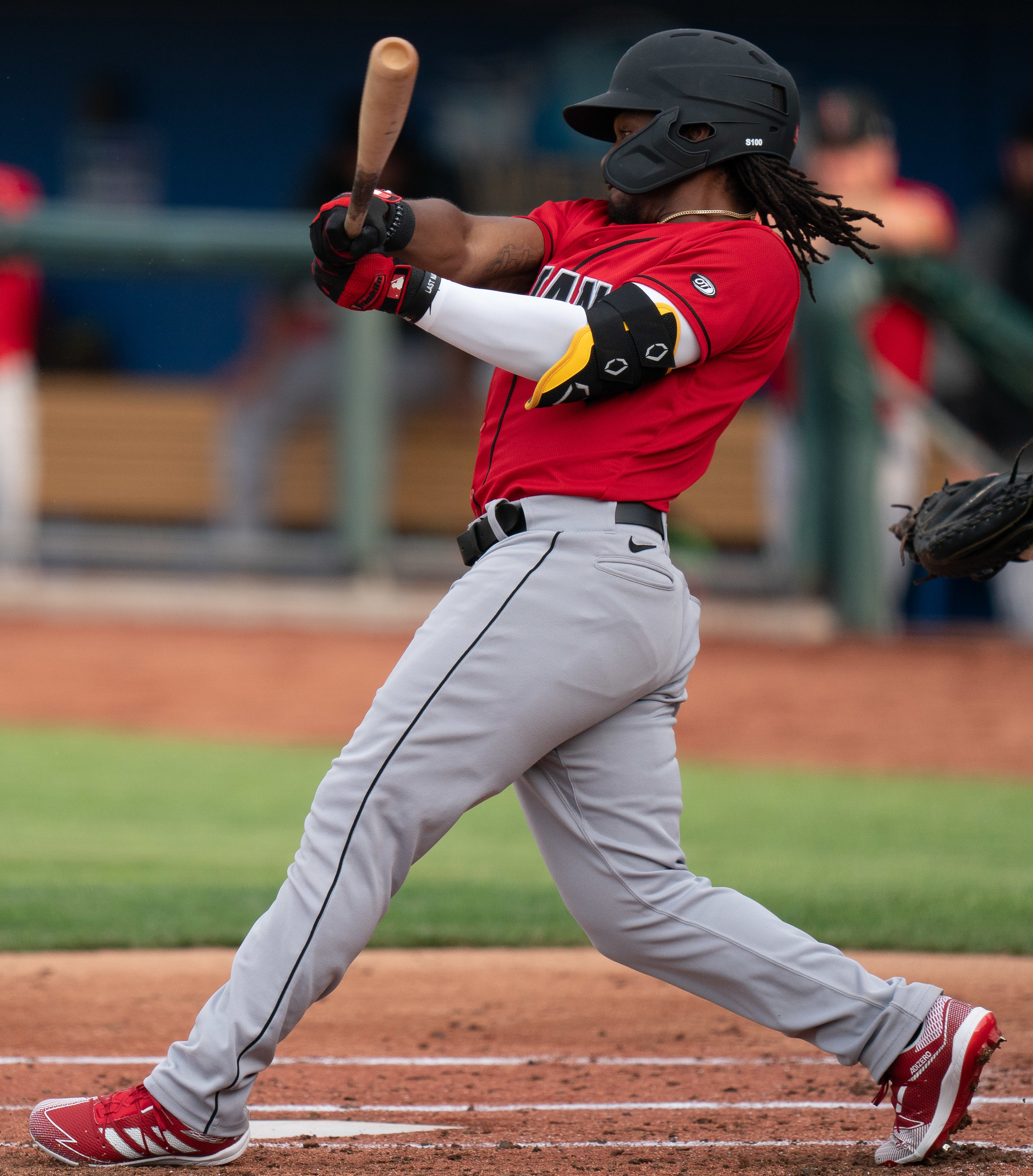
- Stokes with the Indianapolis Indians in 2021
- Outfielder
- Born: February 2, 1996 (age 30); Columbia, Maryland, U.S.
- Batted: Right Threw: Right

MLB debut
- May 9, 2021, for the Pittsburgh Pirates

Last MLB appearance
- May 16, 2021, for the Pittsburgh Pirates

MLB statistics
- Batting average: .111
- Home runs: 0
- Runs batted in: 2
- Stats at Baseball Reference

Teams
- Pittsburgh Pirates (2021)

Troy William Stokes Jr. (born February 2, 1996) is an American former professional baseball outfielder. He played in Major League Baseball (MLB) for the Pittsburgh Pirates during the 2021 season.

== Career ==
=== Milwaukee Brewers ===
Stokes attended Calvert Hall College High School in Towson, Maryland. He was drafted by the Milwaukee Brewers in the fourth round of the 2014 Major League Baseball draft.

Stokes signed with Milwaukee and made his professional debut with the Arizona League Brewers, hitting .262 over 47 games. In 2015, he played with the Helena Brewers, slashing .270/.384/.407 with five home runs, 27 RBIs, and 26 stolen bases over 62 games, and in 2016, he played for the Wisconsin Timber Rattlers with whom he hit .268 with four home runs and 29 RBIs in 86 games. Stokes played 2017 with the Carolina Mudcats and Biloxi Shuckers, batting .251 with twenty home runs, 74 RBIs, and 31 stolen bases over 135 total games. He played for Biloxi in 2018, hitting .233 with 19 home runs and 58 RBIs in 129 games, and won a minor league Gold Glove Award. The Brewers added him to their 40-man roster after the 2018 season. On September 1, 2019, Stokes was designated for assignment.

=== Detroit Tigers ===
On September 3, 2019, Stokes was claimed off waivers by the Detroit Tigers.

In July 2020, Stokes underwent surgery to repair a broken hamate bone in his hand, and as a result missed the entire 2020 season. On January 5, 2021, Stokes was designated for assignment to clear space for Robbie Grossman on the 40-man roster.

=== Pittsburgh Pirates ===
On January 12, 2021, Stokes was claimed off waivers by the Pittsburgh Pirates. On January 24, Stokes was designated for assignment and was outrighted to the Triple–A Indianapolis Indians on January 29.

On May 9, 2021, Stokes was selected to the 40-man roster and promoted to the major leagues for the first time. He made his MLB debut that day as the starting right fielder against the Chicago Cubs. After notching 2 hits in 20 plate appearances, on May 17, Stokes was designated for assignment following the waiver claim of Ildemaro Vargas. He was outrighted to Triple-A Indianapolis on May 21.

=== Milwaukee Brewers (second stint) ===
On June 25, 2021, Stokes was traded along with Jandel Gustave to the Milwaukee Brewers in exchange for Samuel Escudero. He elected free agency after the season.

=== York Revolution ===
On April 4, 2022, Stokes signed with the York Revolution of the Atlantic League of Professional Baseball. Stokes played in 113 games for York, hitting .274/.363/.485 with 19 home runs, 62 RBI, and 31 stolen bases. He became a free agent following the season.

On April 10, 2023, Stokes re-signed with the Revolution for the 2023 season. In 109 games for York, he batted .288/.367/.499 with 18 home runs, 77 RBI, and 27 stolen bases. On September 9, Stokes was released by the Revolution.

=== Dorados de Chihuahua ===
On January 17, 2024, Stokes signed with the Dorados de Chihuahua of the Mexican League. However, he was released prior to the start of the season on April 10.

On April 16, 2024, Stokes announced his retirement from professional baseball via an Instagram post.
