= JT Brubaker =

American baseball player (born 1993)

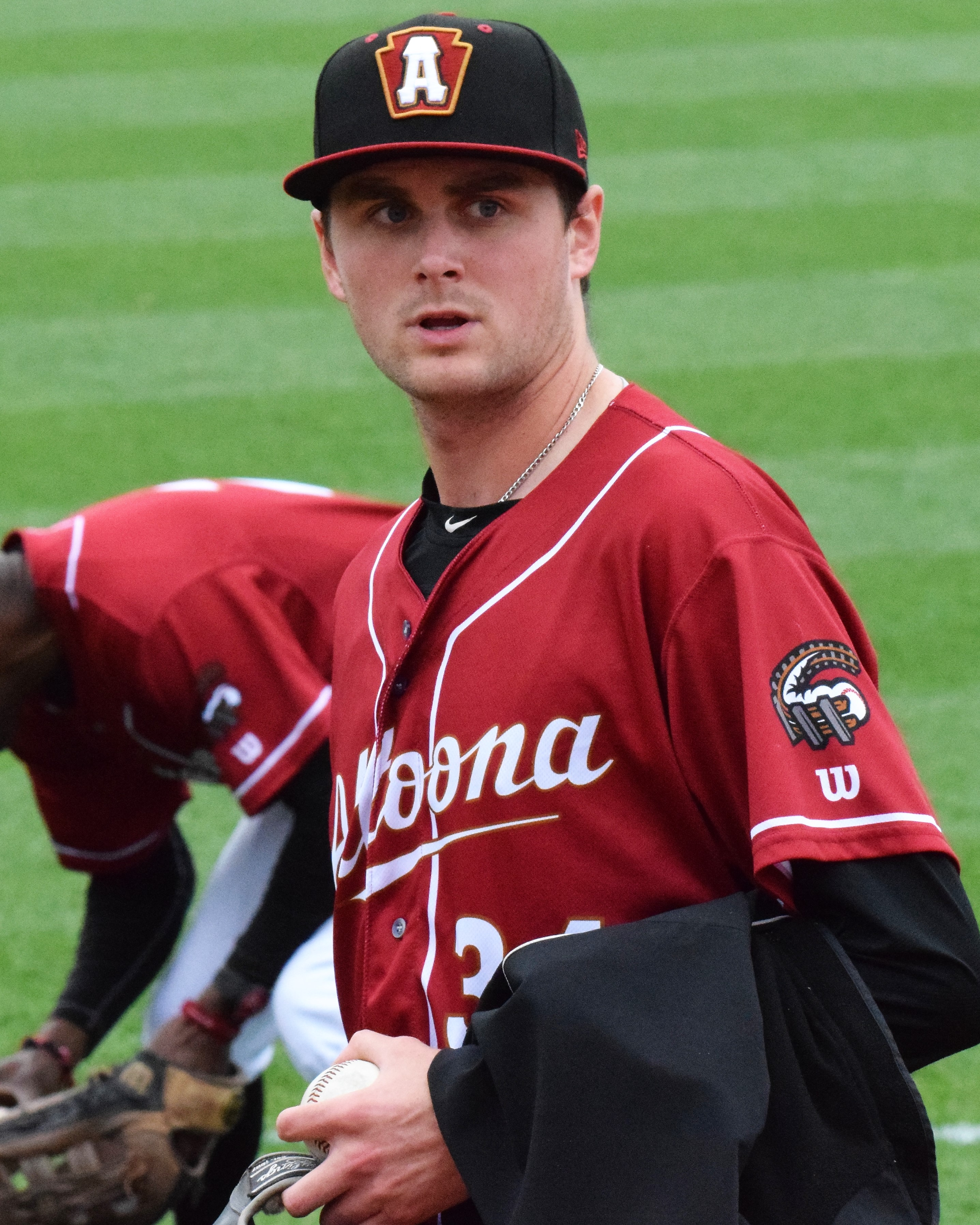
- Brubaker with the Altoona Curve in 2018

Free agent
- Pitcher
- Born: November 17, 1993 (age 32); Springfield, Ohio, U.S.
- Bats: Right Throws: Right

MLB debut
- July 26, 2020, for the Pittsburgh Pirates

MLB statistics (through 2026 season)
- Win–loss record: 9–28
- Earned run average: 4.69
- Strikeouts: 385
- Stats at Baseball Reference

Teams
- Pittsburgh Pirates (2020–2022); New York Yankees (2025); San Francisco Giants (2025–2026)

Jonathan Trey Brubaker (born November 17, 1993) is an American professional baseball pitcher who is a free agent. He has played in Major League Baseball (MLB) for the Pittsburgh Pirates, New York Yankees, and San Francisco Giants. Brubaker played college baseball for the Akron Zips. He was selected by the Pirates in the sixth round of the 2015 MLB draft, and he made his MLB debut in 2020.

== Early life and amateur career ==
Brubaker was born in Ohio to Frank and Teresa Brubaker. Frank played in Minor League Baseball as a pitcher.

Brubaker attended Tecumseh High School in New Carlisle, Ohio, and the University of Akron, where he played college baseball for the Akron Zips. In 2015, his junior year, he had a 5–4 win–loss record with a 3.63 earned run average (ERA) over 15 games started.

== Professional career ==
=== Pittsburgh Pirates ===
The Pittsburgh Pirates selected Brubaker in the sixth round of the 2015 Major League Baseball draft. He signed with Pittsburgh for a $200,000 signing bonus and made his professional debut that season with the West Virginia Black Bears, compiling a 6–4 record with a 2.82 ERA over 15 starts. In 2016, he played for the West Virginia Power and the Bradenton Marauders where he pitched to a combined 6–11 record with a 4.44 ERA in 26 starts between the two clubs, and in 2017, he pitched with the Altoona Curve, going 7–6 with a 4.44 ERA in 26 games (24 starts).

Brubaker began 2018 with Altoona and was promoted to the Indianapolis Indians in May. In 28 starts between both teams, he went 10–6 with a 2.81 ERA and a 1.26 WHIP. After the season, the Pirates named Brubaker their minor league pitcher of the year. The Pirates added him to their 40-man roster after the season. He returned to Indianapolis to begin 2019, but appeared in only six games during the season due to a strained forearm.

Brubaker made the Opening Day roster in 2020 and made his major league debut on July 26, pitching two scoreless innings against the St. Louis Cardinals. He finished the shortened 2020 season with a 1–3 record, a 4.94 ERA and 48 strikeouts in 47 1/3 innings. In 2021, he went 5–13 with a 5.36 ERA and 129 strikeouts in 124 1/3 innings over 24 starts. The Pirates named Brubaker their starting pitcher for Opening Day of the 2022 season. In 2022, Brubaker made 28 starts for Pittsburgh, logging a 3–12 record and 4.69 ERA with 147 strikeouts in 144 innings pitched.

On January 13, 2023, Brubaker agreed to a one-year, $2.275 million contract with the Pirates, avoiding salary arbitration. Brubaker was placed on the injured list to begin the 2023 season due to forearm/elbow discomfort. On April 12, Brubaker underwent Tommy John surgery, ending his season. He rehabilitated from the surgery and agreed to a $2.275 million salary for the 2024 season.

=== New York Yankees ===
On March 29, 2024, the Pirates traded Brubaker and international signing bonus pool space to the New York Yankees in exchange for a player to be named later. Keiner Delgado was traded to the Pirates as the PTBNL on April 30. He made eight rehab appearances split between the rookie-level Florida Complex League Yankees, Single-A Tampa Tarpons, Double-A Somerset Patriots, and Triple-A Scranton/Wilkes-Barre RailRiders.

On February 28, 2025, it was announced that Brubaker suffered three fractured ribs trying to avoid a comebacker. He began the season on the injured list as a result, rehabbed with Scranton, Somerset, and the High-A Hudson Valley Renegades, and was activated on June 18. In 12 appearances for the Yankees, Brubaker recorded a 3.38 ERA with 10 strikeouts over 16 innings of work. On August 5, Brubaker was designated for assignment by New York. He cleared waivers and was released on August 7.

=== San Francisco Giants ===
On August 13, 2025, Brubaker signed a minor league contract with the San Francisco Giants organization. In three appearances (two starts) for the Triple-A Sacramento River Cats, he logged a 1-0 record and 1.64 ERA with seven strikeouts over 11 innings of work. On September 1, the Giants selected Brubaker's contract, adding him to their active roster. Brubaker appeared in 5 games for the Giants in 2025, compiling a 4.26 ERA while striking out 12 across 12 2/3 innings.

On June 12, 2026, Brubaker, alongside teammates Landen Roupp and Ryan Walker each wrote the Bible passage Genesis 9:12–16 on their respective hats, which featured a rainbow Giants logo, during the Giants' Pride Night event. Following the game, all three were each reprimanded and issued warnings by MLB for writing on their caps. The players' protest drew criticism from local outlets and fans, given the region's long history with the LGBTQ community.

== Personal life ==
Brubaker and his wife, Darci, had their first child, a son, in August 2022.

== See also ==
- List of baseball players who underwent Tommy John surgery
