= Bryse Wilson =

American baseball player (born 1997)

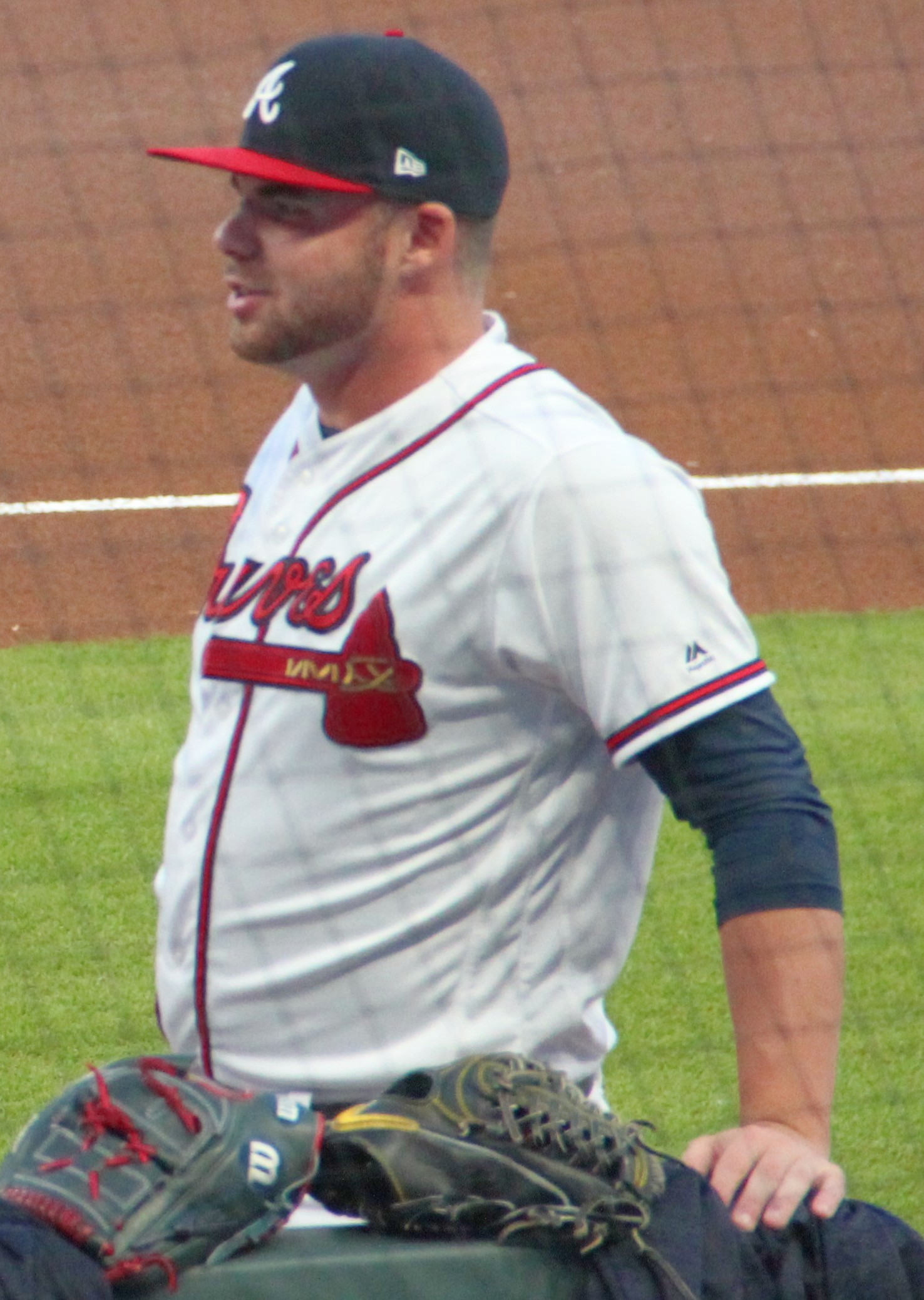
- Wilson with the Atlanta Braves in 2018

Free agent
- Pitcher
- Born: December 20, 1997 (age 28); Hillsborough, North Carolina, U.S.
- Bats: Right Throws: Right

MLB debut
- August 20, 2018, for the Atlanta Braves

MLB statistics (through 2026 season)
- Win–loss record: 20–23
- Earned run average: 4.79
- Strikeouts: 364
- Stats at Baseball Reference

Teams
- Atlanta Braves (2018–2021); Pittsburgh Pirates (2021–2022); Milwaukee Brewers (2023–2024); Chicago White Sox (2025); Philadelphia Phillies (2026); Chicago Cubs (2026); Milwaukee Brewers (2026)

Bryse Everett Wilson (born December 20, 1997) is an American professional baseball pitcher who is a free agent. He has previously played in Major League Baseball (MLB) for the Atlanta Braves, Pittsburgh Pirates, Chicago White Sox, Philadelphia Phillies, and Chicago Cubs. Wilson was selected by the Braves in the fourth round of the 2016 MLB draft and made his MLB debut in 2018.

== Early life and amateur career ==
Bryse Wilson was born on December 20, 1997, in Hillsborough, North Carolina, to parents Chad and Tracey. His father is a truck driver, and his mother works for Blue Cross Blue Shield of North Carolina. He has a younger brother Payton, who plays for the Pittsburgh Steelers.

Wilson attended Orange High School in Hillsborough, North Carolina and played both baseball and football. As a senior, he was named The News & Observer's high school athlete of the year. That year, Wilson pitched to a 10–2 record, with six shutouts and three no-hitters, as well as a perfect game in the North Carolina 3A playoffs. In his high school career, he won 33 games, and lost only four. Wilson was drafted by the Atlanta Braves in the fourth round of the 2016 Major League Baseball draft, 109th overall, and offered a $1.2 million signing bonus.

== Professional career ==
=== Atlanta Braves (2016–2021) ===
Wilson made his professional debut with the rookie-level Gulf Coast League Braves in 2016, going 1–1 with an 0.68 ERA and 29 strikeouts in 26 2/3 innings pitched. He spent 2017 with the Single-A Rome Braves and was selected to the South Atlantic League All-Star Game. Wilson posted a 10–7 record, 2.50 ERA, and 139 strikeouts in 137 total innings pitched for Rome.

Wilson began the 2018 season with the High-A Florida Fire Frogs, and in May, was promoted to the Double-A Mississippi Braves. On July 31, Wilson joined the Triple-A Gwinnett Stripers. Across three minor league levels prior to his promotion to the major leagues, Wilson started 23 games, compiling an 8–5 win–loss record and 3.23 ERA.

Wilson was promoted to the major leagues on August 20, 2018, and debuted the same day against the Pittsburgh Pirates. Wilson pitched five innings, yielding three hits and three walks alongside five strikeouts. He earned the victory in the Braves' 1–0 win, and became the youngest pitcher to win his debut by that score. Wilson was optioned to Gwinnett after the game. In 2018 with the Braves he pitched seven innings over three games.

Wilson made six appearances (four starts) for Atlanta during the 2019 campaign, registering a 1–1 record and 7.20 ERA with 16 strikeouts over 20 innings of work. He made six more appearances (two starts) for the Braves during the 2020 season, compiling a 1–0 record and 4.02 ERA with 15 strikeouts and one saves across 15 2/3 innings pitched. Wilson was announced as Atlanta’s Game 4 starter in the NLCS on October 14, 2020. The following day, in his first postseason start, Wilson gave up one run over six innings with 5 strikeouts. The Braves handled the Los Angeles Dodgers, 10–2, to go up 3–1 in the series.

Wilson made eight starts for Atlanta to begin the 2021 season, compiling a 2–3 record and 5.88 ERA with 23 strikeouts across 33 2/3 innings pitched.

=== Pittsburgh Pirates (2021–2022) ===
On July 30, 2021, Wilson was traded to the Pittsburgh Pirates along with Ricky DeVito in exchange for Richard Rodríguez. In 8 starts down the stretch, he posted a 1–4 record and 4.91 ERA with 23 strikeouts across 40 1/3 innings pitched.

Wilson made 25 appearances (20 starts) for Pittsburgh in 2022, compiling a 3–9 record and 5.52 ERA with 79 strikeouts across 115 2/3 innings pitched. He was designated for assignment following the signing of Jarlín García on December 28, 2022.

=== Milwaukee Brewers (2023–2024) ===
On January 4, 2023, Wilson was traded to the Milwaukee Brewers in exchange for cash considerations. In 53 appearances out of the bullpen, he compiled a 6–0 record and 2.58 ERA with 61 strikeouts across 76 2/3 innings pitched.

Wilson made 34 appearances for Milwaukee in 2024, registering a 5–4 record and 4.04 ERA with 82 strikeouts over 104 2/3 innings pitched. On November 4, Wilson was removed from the 40–man roster and sent outright to the Triple–A Nashville Sounds, but he rejected the assignment and elected free agency.

=== Chicago White Sox (2025) ===
On December 18, 2024, Wilson signed a one–year, $1.05 million contract with the Chicago White Sox. The contract included $250,000 in incentives. In 19 appearances for Chicago, he struggled to an 0–2 record and 6.95 ERA with 27 strikeouts across 45 1/3 innings pitched. Wilson was designated for assignment by the White Sox on June 10, 2025. He cleared waivers and was sent outright to the Triple-A Charlotte Knights on June 14. On August 31, the White Sox added Wilson back to their active roster. He made one appearance for Chicago, tossing two scoreless innings against the Minnesota Twins. On September 4, Wilson was designated for assignment by Chicago for a second time. He cleared waivers and was sent outright to Triple-A Charlotte on September 6. Wilson elected free agency on September 30.

=== Philadelphia Phillies (2026) ===
On December 12, 2025, Wilson signed a minor league contract with the Philadelphia Phillies. He made 10 appearances (including nine starts) for the Triple-A Lehigh Valley IronPigs, but struggled to a 3–5 record and 7.23 ERA with 49 strikeouts across 47 1/3 innings pitched. Wilson was released by the Phillies organization on June 3, 2026. However, two days later, he re-signed with Philadelphia on a new minor league contract. On June 17, Wilson triggered the upward mobility clause in his contract. Consequently, Wilson was added to the team's major league roster the next day, pitching two scoreless innings in that day's game against the New York Mets: his lone game with the Phillies. He was designated for assignment on June 22.

=== Chicago Cubs (2026) ===
On June 24, 2026, Wilson was claimed off of waivers by the Chicago Cubs. He made two appearances for Chicago, but struggled to an 8.22 ERA with eight strikeouts across 7 2/3 innings pitched. Wilson was designated for assignment by the Cubs on July 4. He cleared waivers and was sent outright to the Triple-A Iowa Cubs on July 7, but rejected the assignment and elected free agency.

=== Milwaukee Brewers (2026–present) ===
On July 10, 2026, Wilson signed a major league contract with the Milwaukee Brewers. In six appearances for Milwaukee, he recorded a 2.63 ERA with 10 strikeouts across 13 2/3 innings pitched. Wilson was designated for assignment by the Brewers on August 8. He elected free agency after clearing waivers on August 10. The following day, Wilson re–signed with Milwaukee on a major league contract. He made 13 total appearances for the Brewers, recording a 3.51 ERA with 23 strikeouts across 25 2/3 innings pitched. On November 2, Wilson was removed from the 40–man roster and elected free agency.
