= Richard Rodríguez (baseball) =

Dominican baseball player (born 1990)

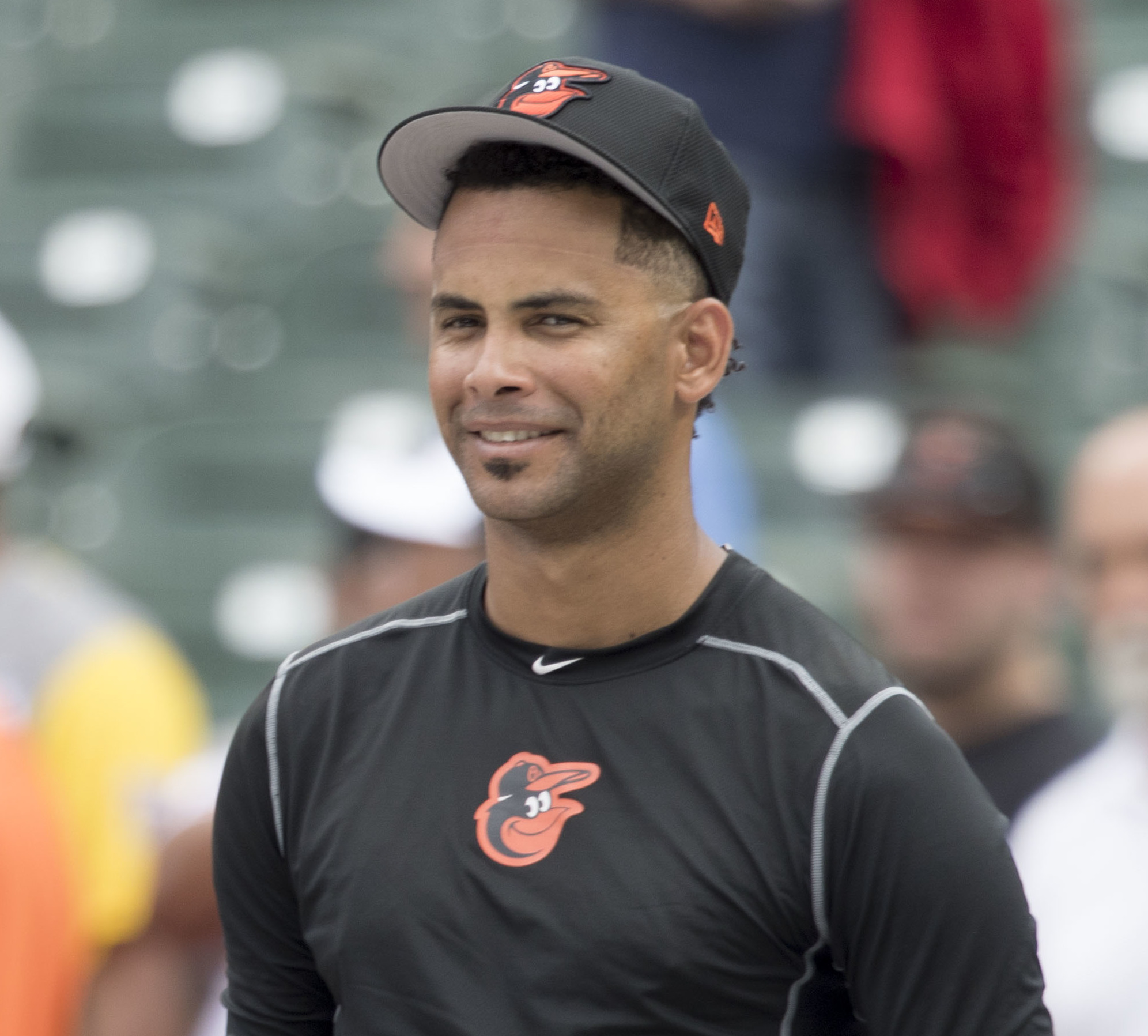
- Rodríguez with the Baltimore Orioles

Sultanes de Monterrey – No. 48
- Pitcher
- Born: March 4, 1990 (age 36); Santiago, Dominican Republic
- Bats: Right Throws: Right

MLB debut
- September 2, 2017, for the Baltimore Orioles

MLB statistics (through 2021 season)
- Win–loss record: 16–14
- Earned run average: 3.28
- Strikeouts: 230
- Stats at Baseball Reference

Teams
- Baltimore Orioles (2017); Pittsburgh Pirates (2018–2021); Atlanta Braves (2021)

Richard Agustín Rodríguez (born March 4, 1990) is a Dominican professional baseball pitcher for the Sultanes de Monterrey of the Mexican League. He has previously played in Major League Baseball (MLB) for the Baltimore Orioles, Pittsburgh Pirates, and Atlanta Braves.

== Career ==
=== Houston Astros ===
On May 26, 2010, Rodríguez began his professional career by signing with the Houston Astros organization, and was assigned to the Dominican Summer League Astros. He spent 2011 with the rookie-level Gulf Coast League Astros, form whom he posted a 9.82 ERA with three strikeouts. Rodríguez spent 2012 with the GCL Astros, the rookie-level Greeneville Astros, and Single-A Lexington Legends, for whom he accumulated a 2–1 record and 3.82 ERA with 41 strikeouts across nine appearances (seven starts).

In 2013, Rodríguez played for Greeneville, the Low-A Tri-City ValleyCats and Single-A Quad Cities River Bandits, for whom he posted a cumulative 4–1 record and 4.47 ERA with 41 strikeouts and one save across 44 1/3 innings pitched. In 2014, Rodríguez spent time with the High-A Lancaster JetHawks, Double-A Corpus Christi Hooks, and Triple-A Oklahoma City RedHawks, and accumulated a combined 2–2 record and 3.62 ERA with 67 strikeouts across 34 total appearances. He began the 2015 season with the Triple-A Fresno Grizzlies.

=== Baltimore Orioles ===
On June 25, 2015, Rodríguez was acquired by the Orioles from the Houston Astros in exchange for a player to be named later or cash. He spent the rest of the 2015 season with the Double-A Bowie Baysox and Triple-A Norfolk Tides. Rodríguez spent the entire 2016 season with Norfolk, with whom he logged a 6–2 record and 2.53 ERA with 81 strikeouts and two saves across 81 2/3 innings pitched. He began the 2017 back with Norfolk.

On September 1, 2017, Rodríguez was selected to the 40-man roster and promoted to the major leagues for the first time. Rodríguez was designated for assignment by the Orioles on September 17 following the promotion of Tanner Scott and outrighted the same day. five 5 relief appearances, he had posted a 14.29 ERA with three strikeouts. Rodríguez elected free agency following the season on November 6.

=== Pittsburgh Pirates ===
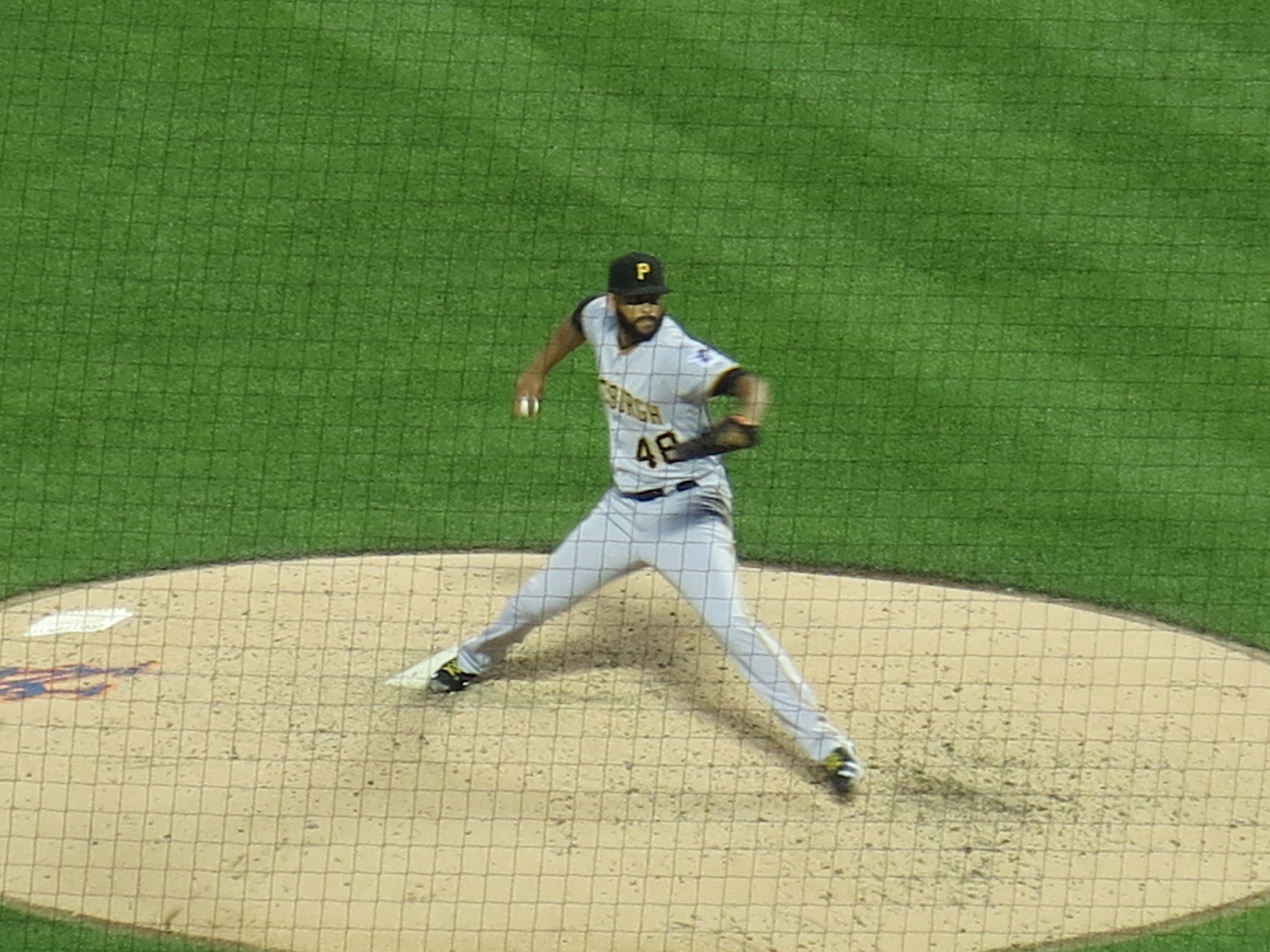
Rodríguez with the Pirates in 2018

On December 8, 2017, Rodríguez signed a minor league contract with the Pittsburgh Pirates. He began the 2018 season with the Indianapolis Indians of the Triple–A International League, and was promoted to the major leagues on April 13. In his first season as a Pirate, Rodríguez went 4–3 with a 2.47 ERA in 63 games. He struck out 88 batters in 69 1/3 innings.

In 2019, Rodríguez went 4–5 with a 3.72 ERA, striking out 63 batters in 65 1/3 innings. He made 72 appearances, the most on the team among pitchers. In 2020 for Pittsburgh, he pitched to a 3–2 record with a 2.70 ERA, 34 strikeouts, and 4 saves in 23 1/3 innings of work.

=== Atlanta Braves ===
On July 30, 2021, Rodriguez was traded to the Atlanta Braves in exchange for Bryse Wilson and Ricky DeVito. Between the two teams, he was 5–4 with 14 saves and a 2.94 ERA, as in 64 relief appearances he pitched 64 1/3 innings with an 0.933 WHIP. The Braves finished with an 88–73 record, clinching the NL East, and eventually won the 2021 World Series, giving the Braves their first title since 1995. On November 30, Rodríguez was non-tendered by the Braves, making him a free agent.

On April 4, 2022, Rodríguez was suspended by MLB for 80 games after violation of their Joint Drug Prevention and Treatment Program, testing positive for Boldenone.

=== New York Yankees ===
On June 21, 2022, Rodríguez signed a minor league deal with the New York Yankees. Rodríguez made 17 appearances for the Triple-A Scranton/Wilkes-Barre RailRiders, pitching to a 3–1 record and 3.86 ERA with 21 strikeouts in 22 1/3 innings of work. He elected free agency following the season on November 10.

=== Miami Marlins ===
On February 28, 2023, Rodríguez signed a minor league contract with the Miami Marlins organization that included an invitation to Spring Training. In 39 relief outings for the Triple–A Jacksonville Jumbo Shrimp he logged a 4.38 ERA with 43 strikeouts. Rodríguez elected free agency following the season on November 6.

=== Sultanes de Monterrey ===
On February 7, 2024, Rodríguez signed with the Sultanes de Monterrey of the Mexican League. In 41 appearances for Monterrey, he logged a 3–3 record and 4.14 ERA with 52 strikeouts and four saves over 41 1/3 innings pitched.

In 2025, Rodríguez returned for a second season with Monterrey. In 33 games 34.1 innings of relief he went 4–2 with a 2.62 ERA and 39 strikeouts.
