= Will Craig =

American baseball player (born 1994)

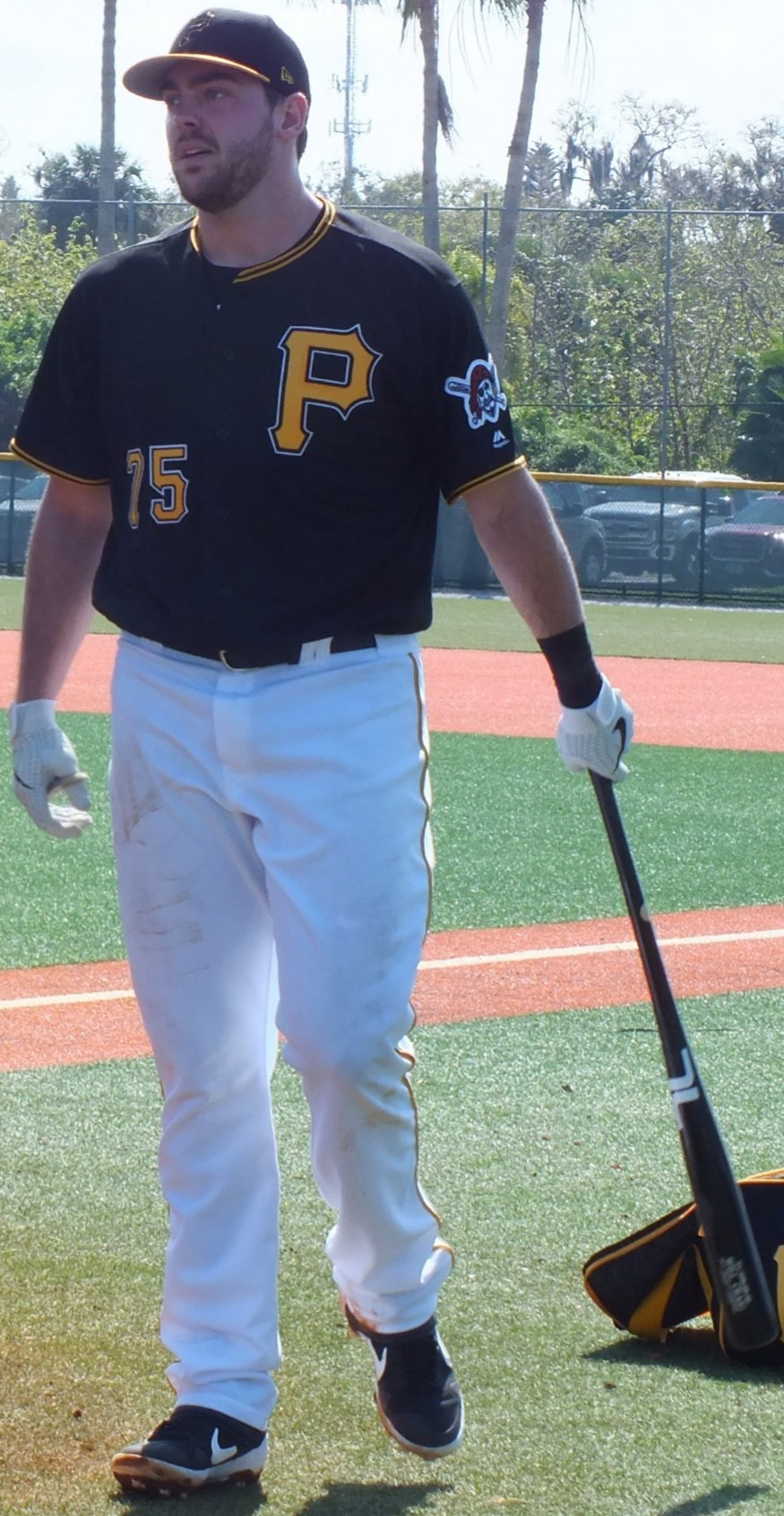
- Craig with the Pittsburgh Pirates in 2019
- First baseman
- Born: November 16, 1994 (age 31); Johnson City, Tennessee, U.S.
- Batted: Right Threw: Right

Professional debut
- MLB: August 27, 2020, for the Pittsburgh Pirates
- KBO: August 12, 2021, for the Kiwoom Heroes

Last appearance
- MLB: June 1, 2021, for the Pittsburgh Pirates
- KBO: October 30, 2021, for the Kiwoom Heroes

MLB statistics
- Batting average: .203
- Home runs: 1
- Runs batted in: 3

KBO statistics
- Batting average: .249
- Home runs: 6
- Runs batted in: 30
- Stats at Baseball Reference

Teams
- Pittsburgh Pirates (2020–2021); Kiwoom Heroes (2021)

William Isaac Craig (born November 16, 1994) is an American former professional baseball first baseman. He played in Major League Baseball (MLB) for the Pittsburgh Pirates, and in the KBO League for the Kiwoom Heroes.

== Amateur career ==
Craig attended Science Hill High School in Johnson City, Tennessee. The Kansas City Royals selected Craig in the 13th round of the 2013 Major League Baseball draft, but he did not sign. He attended Wake Forest University, where he played college baseball for the Wake Forest Demon Deacons.

Craig played as both a third baseman and pitcher at Wake Forest. As a freshman in 2014, he had 189 at-bats over 54 games and hit .280/.357/.439 with eight home runs and 36 runs batted in (RBI). As a pitcher he appeared in seven games with one start and went 1–0 with a 4.05 earned run average (ERA). He played collegiate summer baseball for the St. Cloud Rox of the Northwoods League in 2014. As a sophomore, Craig was named the ACC Player of the Year after hitting .382/.496/.702 with 13 home runs and 58 RBI. As a pitcher he was 3–4 with a 6.09 ERA and 39 strikeouts. After the 2015 season, he played collegiate summer baseball for the Chatham Anglers of the Cape Cod Baseball League.

== Professional career ==
=== Pittsburgh Pirates ===
The Pittsburgh Pirates selected Craig in the first round, 22nd overall, in the 2016 Major League Baseball draft. He was the most recent first round pick out of Wake Forest until pitcher Jared Shuster in 2020.

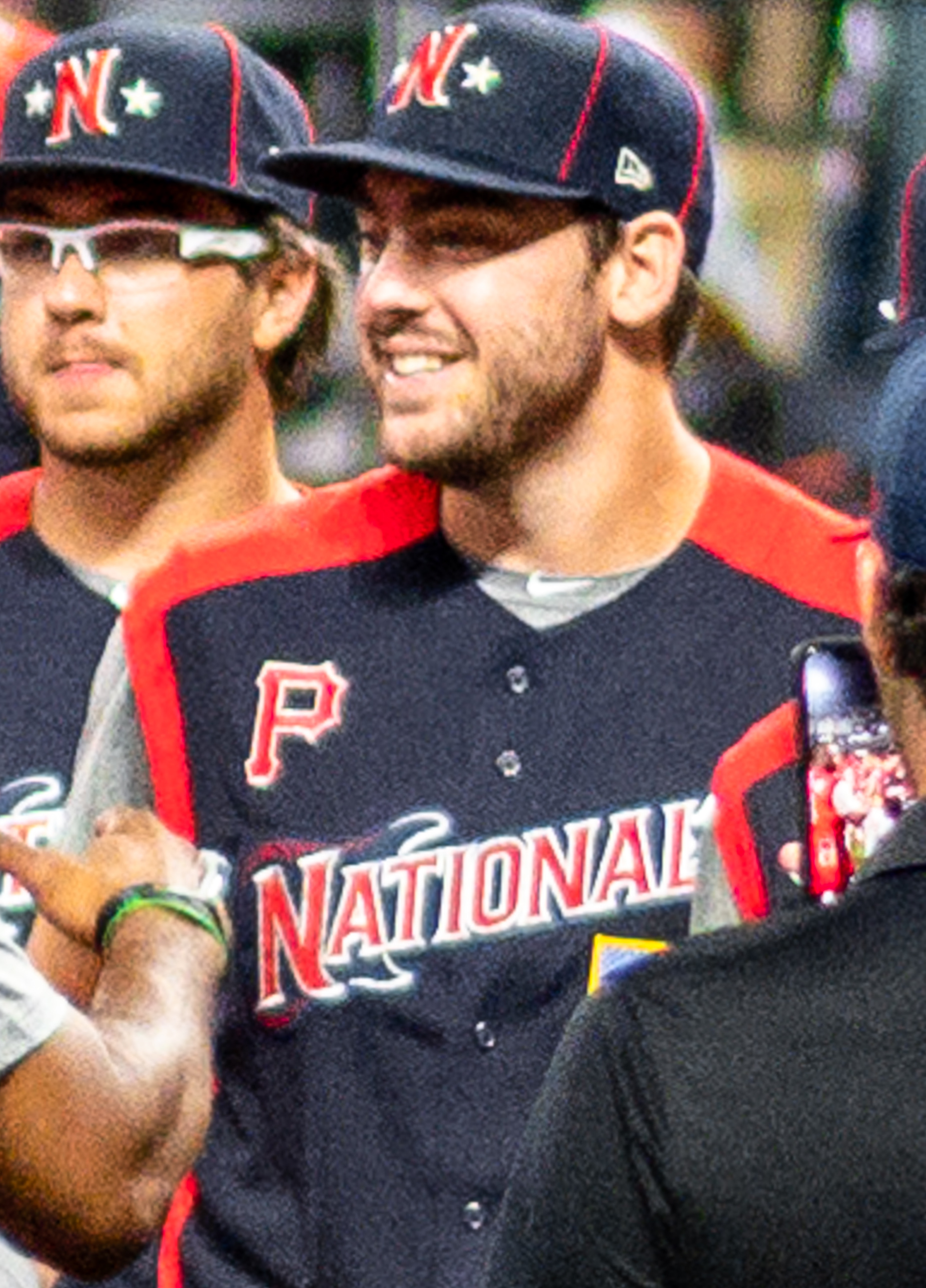
Craig at the 2019 All-Star Futures Game

He signed and was then assigned to the West Virginia Black Bears where he batted .280 with two home runs and 23 RBIs in 63 games. In 2017, Craig played for the Bradenton Marauders, posting a .271 batting average with six home runs and 61 RBIs in 123 games, and in 2018, he played with the Altoona Curve, batting .248 with twenty home runs and 102 RBIs in 132 games. He spent the 2019 season with the Indianapolis Indians, slashing .249/.326/.435 with 23 home runs and 78 RBIs over 131 games. Craig was named to the 2019 All-Star Futures Game. Craig was added to the Pirates 40-man roster following the 2019 season.

On August 27, 2020, Craig was promoted to the major leagues for the first time and made his debut that night against the St. Louis Cardinals. Craig went hitless in 4 at-bats for the Pirates in 2020. On November 25, 2020, Craig was designated for assignment. He was outrighted to Triple-A Indianapolis on December 2.

On May 13, 2021, Craig was selected to the active roster. That day, he hit his first MLB home run, a solo shot off of San Francisco Giants pitcher Camilo Doval.

On May 27, 2021, Craig's 15th MLB game, he was the key fielder in a blooper reel highlight of 2021, when he chased Javier Báez down the first base line toward home with two outs, instead of simply stepping on the bag to force him out. Willson Contreras scored from second base as Craig threw the ball to catcher Michael Pérez. Báez was able to safely run back to first base, and Pérez's throw to try to retire Báez at first base sailed into right field as second baseman Adam Frazier was late to cover the bag at first. The play was ruled as two errors, with one on Craig and the other on Pérez.

After batting .217/.277/.300 with 1 home run and 3 RBI in 18 games, Craig was designated for assignment by Pittsburgh on June 4. He was outrighted to the Triple-A Indianapolis Indians on June 9.

=== Kiwoom Heroes ===
On July 13, 2021, Craig was acquired by the Kiwoom Heroes of the KBO League and signed a contract worth $371K with the team. In 61 games, he slashed .248/.320/.383 with 6 home runs and 30 RBIs. Craig was not re-signed for the 2022 season.

== Coaching career ==
In June 2022, Craig returned to Wake Forest to complete his college degree. On August 25, 2022, Wake Forest hired Craig as part of Tom Walter's coaching staff for the ensuing season as the student assistant coach. After graduating from Wake Forest, Craig was an Assistant Coach at Belmont University for the 2024 and 2025 seasons. Craig joined the Duke University staff as the Recruiting Coordinator ahead of the 2026 season.
