= Max Kranick =

American baseball player (born 1997)

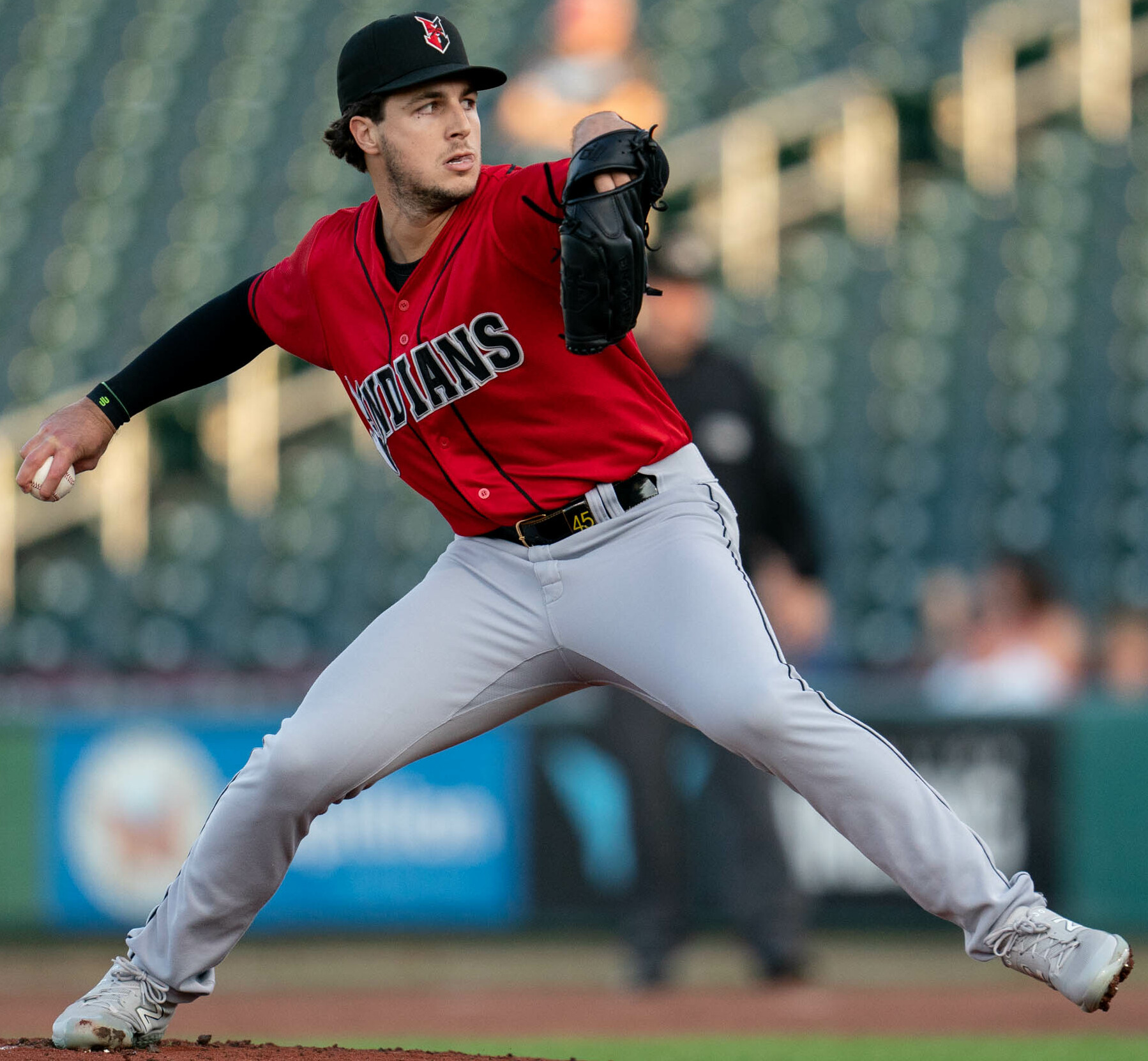
- Kranick with the Indianapolis Indians in 2023

Philadelphia Phillies
- Pitcher
- Born: July 21, 1997 (age 29); Scranton, Pennsylvania, U.S.
- Bats: Right Throws: Right

MLB debut
- June 27, 2021, for the Pittsburgh Pirates

MLB statistics (through 2026 season)
- Win–loss record: 5–6
- Earned run average: 5.55
- Strikeouts: 72
- Stats at Baseball Reference

Teams
- Pittsburgh Pirates (2021–2022); New York Mets (2025); Washington Nationals (2026)

Max Joseph Kranick (born July 21, 1997) is an American professional baseball pitcher in the Philadelphia Phillies organization. He has previously played in Major League Baseball (MLB) for the Pittsburgh Pirates, New York Mets, and Washington Nationals. He made his MLB debut in 2021.

== Amateur career ==
Kranick attended Valley View High School in Archbald, Pennsylvania. For his high school career, he compiled a 1.17 ERA. After his senior year, he was selected by the Pittsburgh Pirates in the 11th round of the 2016 Major League Baseball draft. He signed for $300,000, forgoing his commitment to the University of Virginia.

== Professional career ==
=== Pittsburgh Pirates ===
Kranick made his professional debut that summer with the Rookie-level Gulf Coast League Pirates, going 1–2 with a 2.43 ERA over nine games (six starts). In 2017, he split time between the Gulf Coast League and the Bristol Pirates of the Rookie-level Appalachian League, compiling a combined 1–0 record and 1.11 ERA over five starts. He spent 2018 with the West Virginia Power of the Single–A South Atlantic League, going 4–5 with a 3.81 ERA over 17 games (16 starts), and 2019 with the Bradenton Marauders of the High–A Florida State League, pitching to a 6–7 record and 3.79 ERA over twenty starts.

On November 20, 2020, Kranick was added to Pittsburgh's 40-man roster. He did not play a minor league game in 2020 due to the cancellation of the minor league season caused by the COVID-19 pandemic. To begin the 2021 season, he was assigned to the Altoona Curve of the Double-A Northeast. In late May, he was promoted to the Indianapolis Indians of the Triple-A East League.

On June 27, 2021, Kranick was promoted to the major leagues to make his MLB debut as the starting pitcher versus the St. Louis Cardinals. He threw five perfect innings, striking out three batters, before a rain delay occurred and he was removed. He set the record for the most batters retired to begin a major league career with 15. Over nine starts with the Pirates, Kranick went 2–3 with a 6.28 ERA and 32 strikeouts over 38 2/3 innings.

Kranick opened the 2022 season with Indianapolis before he underwent Tommy John surgery in early June, forcing him out indefinitely. He was activated from the injured list on September 1, 2023, but did not appear in the majors for Pittsburgh. On January 5, 2024, Kranick was designated for assignment by the Pirates.

=== New York Mets ===
On January 12, 2024, Kranick was claimed off waivers by the New York Mets. After beginning the year on the injured list, he made 6 starts split between the Single–A St. Lucie Mets, Double–A Binghamton Rumble Ponies, and Triple–A Syracuse Mets, accumulating a 4.30 ERA with 13 strikeouts across 14 2/3 innings pitched. On May 6, Kranick was designated for assignment by the Mets. He cleared waivers and was sent outright to Syracuse on May 11. He had his contract selected back to the major league roster again on October 1.

Kranick was named to the Mets' Opening Day roster for the 2025 season. Kranick was optioned back to Triple-A Syracuse on June 3 before being called back to the active roster on June 13. In 24 appearances for the Mets, he logged a 3-2 record and 3.65 ERA with 25 strikeouts over 37 innings of work. On July 18, it was announced that Kranick would require Tommy John surgery for the second time, ruling him out for the remainder of the year. On August 3, it was revealed that Kranick had undergone a flexor tendon surgery instead of a Tommy John procedure. On November 21, he was non-tendered by the Mets and became a free agent.

=== Washington Nationals ===
On May 5, 2026, while continuing to rehab from flexor tendon surgery, Kranick signed a major league contract with the Washington Nationals which included a club option for the 2027 season. He was activated from the injured list on July 15. Kranick made 17 appearances for Washington, struggling to a 0–1 record and 9.33 ERA with 11 strikeouts across 18 1/3 innings pitched. Kranick was designated for assignment by the Nationals on September 4; he cleared waivers and was sent outright to the Triple–A Rochester Red Wings two days later. He elected free agency on October 7.

=== Philadelphia Phillies ===
On November 15, 2026, Kranick signed a minor league contract with the Philadelphia Phillies.
