= Luis Oviedo =

Venezuelan baseball player (born 1999)

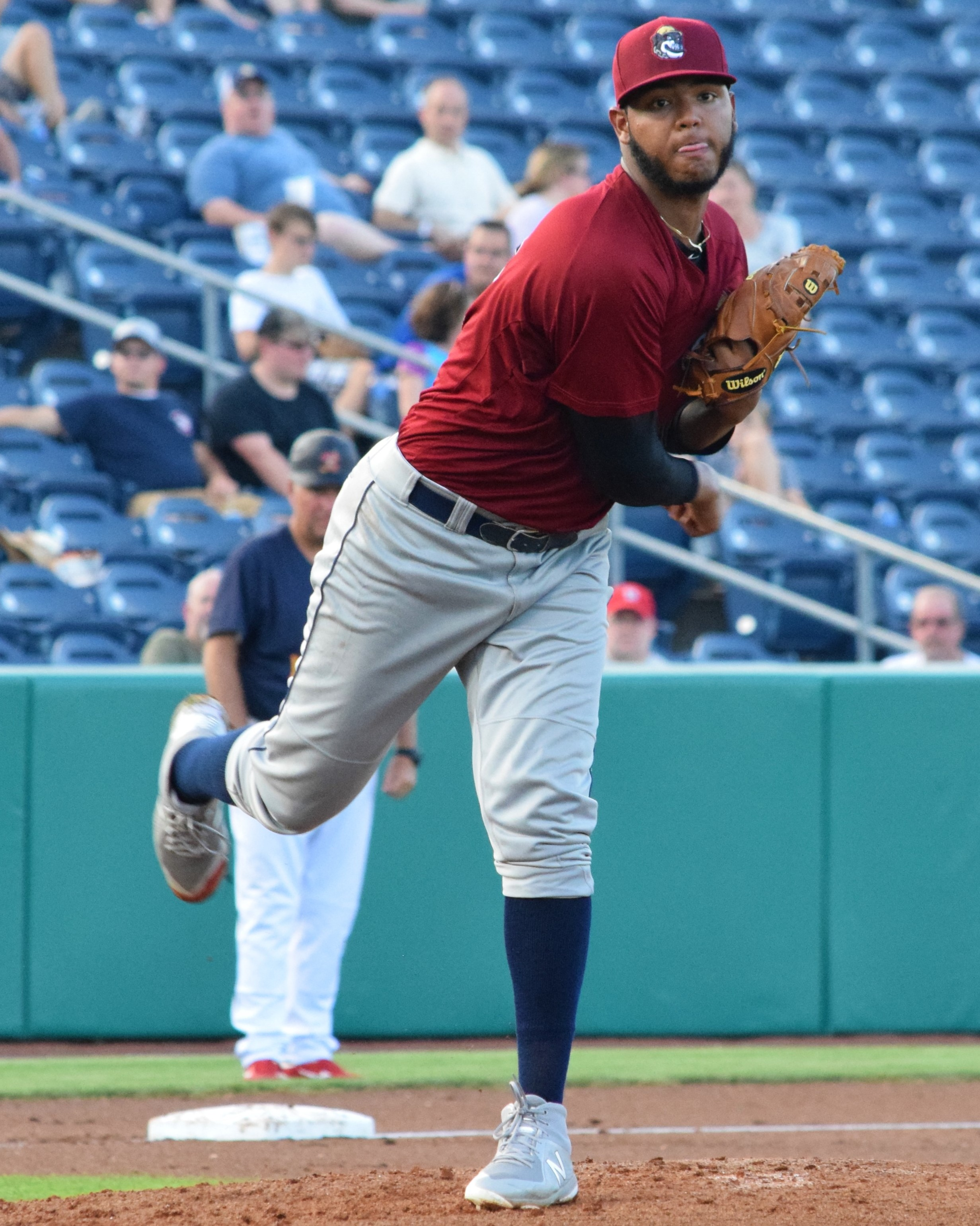
- Oviedo with the Mahoning Valley Scrappers in 2018
- Pitcher
- Born: May 15, 1999 (age 27); Barquisimeto, Venezuela
- Bats: Right Throws: Right

MLB debut
- April 3, 2021, for the Pittsburgh Pirates

MLB statistics (through 2021 season)
- Win–loss record: 1–2
- Earned run average: 8.80
- Strikeouts: 31
- Stats at Baseball Reference

Teams
- Pittsburgh Pirates (2021)

Luis José Oviedo (born May 15, 1999) is a Venezuelan former professional baseball pitcher. He played in Major League Baseball (MLB) for the Pittsburgh Pirates.

== Career ==
=== Cleveland Indians ===
Oviedo signed as an international free agent by the Cleveland Indians on July 2, 2015. In 2019, pitching for the Lake County Captains of the Single–A Midwest League, Oviedo had a 5.38 earned run average with 72 strikeouts and 40 walks in 87 innings pitched. He did not play in a game in 2020 due to the cancellation of the minor league season because of the COVID-19 pandemic.

=== Pittsburgh Pirates ===
On December 10, 2020, The New York Mets selected Oviedo from the Cleveland Indians in the Rule 5 draft. The same day, the Mets traded Oviedo to the Pittsburgh Pirates in exchange for cash considerations.

Oviedo made the Pirates' Opening Day roster in 2021. On April 3, 2021, Oviedo made his MLB debut, pitching a scoreless inning of relief against the Chicago Cubs, also notching his first MLB strikeout, striking out Ian Happ. Throughout 2021, Oviedo made 22 appearances, going 1–2 with an 8.80 ERA and 31 strikeouts.

On April 21, 2022, Oviedo was designated for assignment by the Pirates.

=== Cleveland Guardians ===
Oviedo was claimed off waivers by the Cleveland Guardians on April 26, 2022. The Guardians designated Oviedo for assignment on May 20. After clearing waivers, Oviedo was outrighted to the minor leagues on May 22.

Oviedo spent the entirety of the 2023 season with the Triple–A Columbus Clippers, making 42 appearances and compiling a 4.82 ERA and 60 strikeouts across 61 2/3 innings pitched. He elected free agency following the season on November 6, 2023.

=== Guerreros de Oaxaca ===
On May 18, 2024, Oviedo signed with the Guerreros de Oaxaca of the Mexican League. In 4 games (3 starts), he struggled to a 7.20 ERA with 5 strikeouts across 10 innings of work. On July 2, Oviedo was released by Oaxaca.

== See also ==
- Rule 5 draft results
