= Hunter Owen (baseball) =

American baseball player (born 1993)

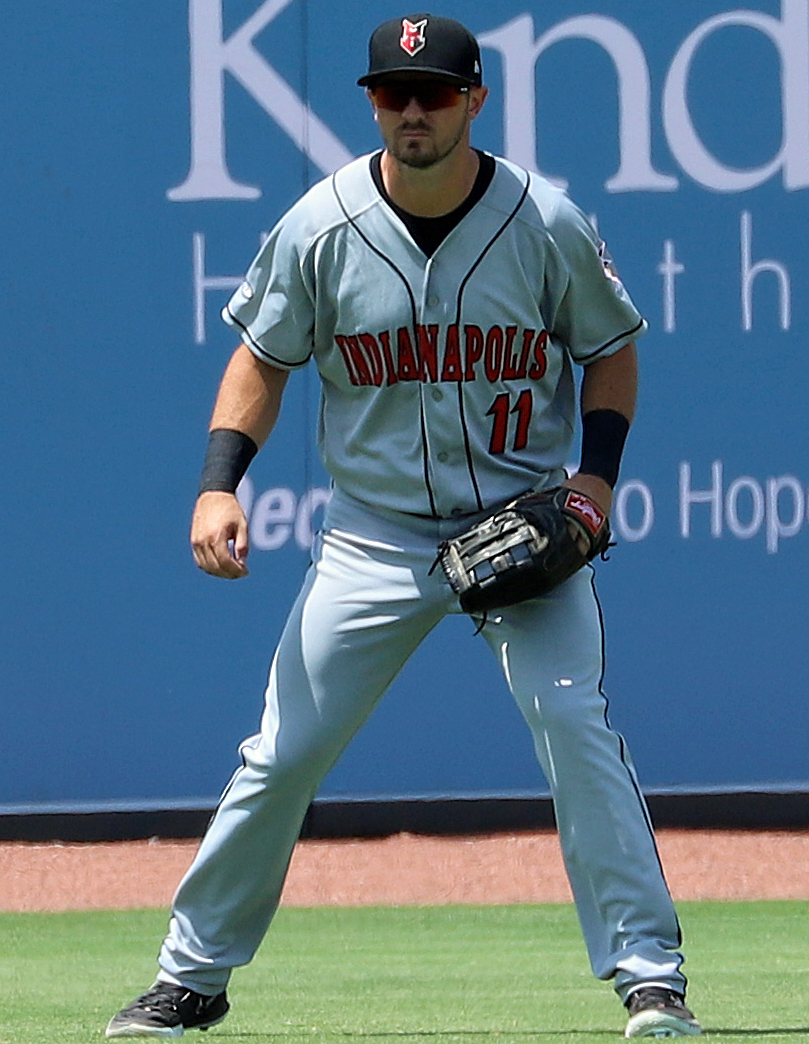
- Owen with the Indianapolis Indians in 2021
- Third baseman / Outfielder
- Born: September 22, 1993 (age 32); Evansville, Indiana, U.S.
- Batted: Right Threw: Right

MLB debut
- May 5, 2021, for the Pittsburgh Pirates

Last MLB appearance
- May 10, 2021, for the Pittsburgh Pirates

MLB statistics
- Batting average: .000
- Home runs: 0
- Runs batted in: 0
- Stats at Baseball Reference

Teams
- Pittsburgh Pirates (2021)

Stephen Hunter Owen (born September 22, 1993) is an American former professional baseball third baseman and outfielder. The Pittsburgh Pirates drafted him in the 25th round of the 2016 Major League Baseball draft, and he made his Major League Baseball (MLB) debut for them in 2021.

== Amateur career ==
Owen attended Mater Dei High School and was drafted out of Indiana State University in the 25th round, 765th overall, of the 2016 Major League Baseball draft.

== Professional career ==
Owen made his professional debut for the Low-A West Virginia Black Bears. In 2017, Owen spent the bulk of the season with the Single-A West Virginia Power, slashing .292/.388/.505 with 11 home runs and 45 RBI in 343 plate appearances. The next year, Owen spent the season with the High-A Bradenton Marauders, with a batting line of .262/.317/.464 to go along with a career-high 18 home runs and 60 RBI. In 2019, Owen split the season between the Double-A Altoona Curve and the Triple-A Indianapolis Indians, batting a cumulative .261/.345/.485 with 19 home runs and 53 RBI.

Owen did not play in a game in 2020 due to the cancellation of the Minor League Baseball season because of the COVID-19 pandemic. Owen was invited to Spring Training for the 2021 season but did not make the club and was assigned to Indianapolis to begin the year.

On May 4, 2021, Owen was selected to the 40-man roster and promoted to the major leagues for the first time. Owen made his debut the next day as the starting right fielder against the San Diego Padres. After going hitless in 5 plate appearances, Owen was designated for assignment on May 11, 2021. He was outrighted to Triple-A Indianapolis on May 15, where he spent the remainder of the year playing in 97 games and hitting .235/.306/.451 with 20 home runs and 53 RBI.

Owen played in 21 total games in 2022, split between the High-A Greensboro Grasshoppers and Triple-A Indianapolis. In a combined 77 plate appearances, he hit .246/.364/.369 with 1 home run and 8 RBI. He elected free agency following the season on November 10, 2022.

Owen retired in the 2022/23 offseason and became a hitting/infield instructor.

== Personal life ==
Owen's father Steve played first base for the Evansville Purple Aces and his older brother, Tyler, played for the Murray State Racers. Owen's high school coach was Jeff Schulz, a former major leaguer with the Kansas City Royals and Pittsburgh Pirates.
