= Kyle Keller (baseball) =

American baseball player (born 1993)

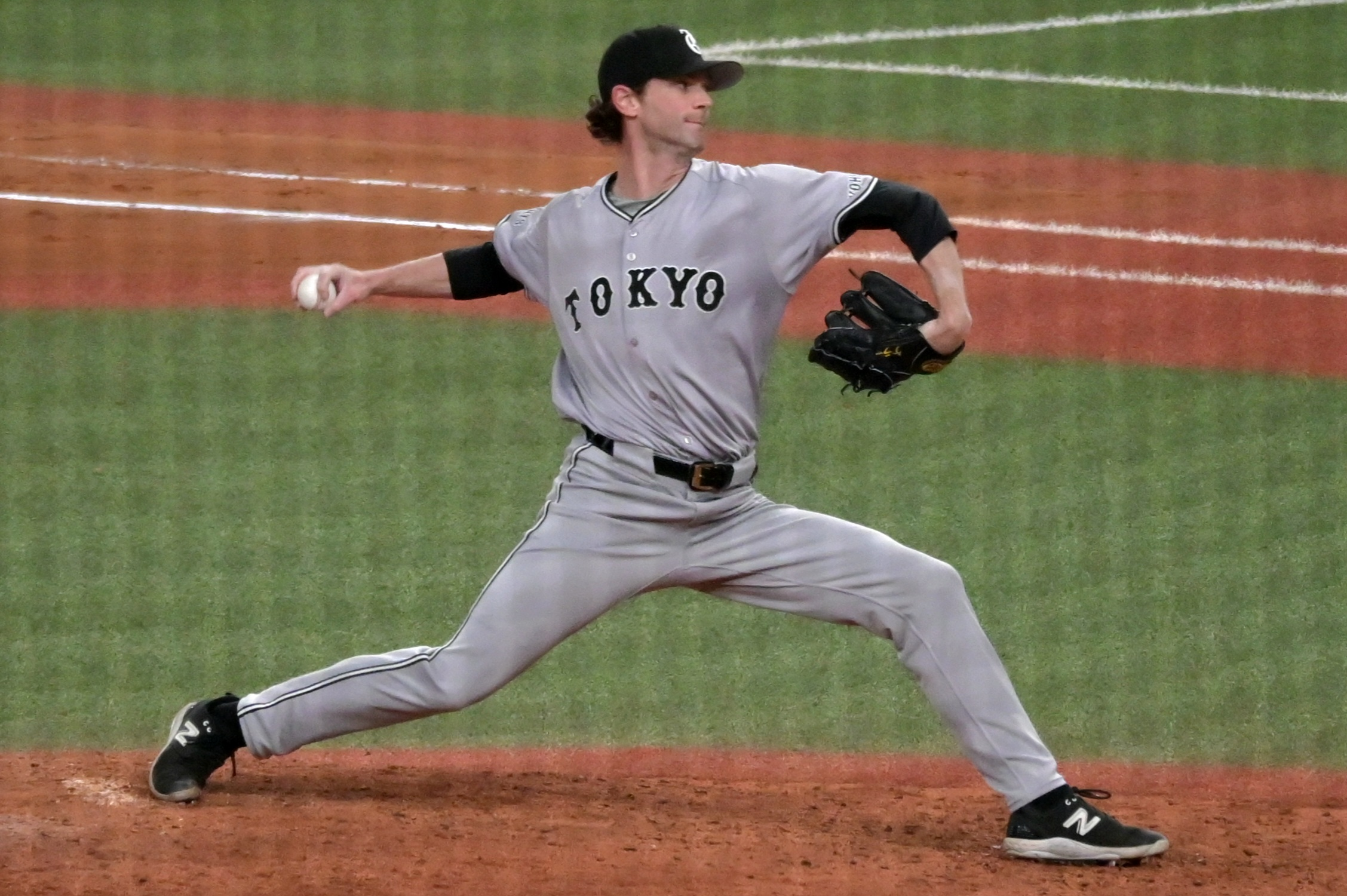
- Keller with the Yomiuri Giants

Free agent
- Pitcher
- Born: April 28, 1993 (age 33); Metairie, Louisiana, U.S.
- Bats: Right Throws: Right

Professional debut
- MLB: August 4, 2019, for the Miami Marlins
- NPB: March 25, 2022, for the Hanshin Tigers

MLB statistics (through 2021 season)
- Win–loss record: 1–1
- Earned run average: 5.83
- Strikeouts: 48

NPB statistics (through 2025 season)
- Win–loss record: 7-5
- Earned run average: 2.42
- Strikeouts: 177
- Stats at Baseball Reference

Teams
- Miami Marlins (2019); Los Angeles Angels (2020); Pittsburgh Pirates (2021); Hanshin Tigers (2022–2023); Yomiuri Giants (2024–2025)

Career highlights and awards
- NPB: Japan Series champion (2023)

Kyle Robert Keller (born April 28, 1993) is an American professional baseball pitcher who is a free agent. He has previously played in Major League Baseball (MLB) for the Miami Marlins, Los Angeles Angels, and Pittsburgh Pirates, and in Nippon Professional Baseball (NPB) for the Hanshin Tigers and Yomiuri Giants.

== Amateur career ==
Keller attended Jesuit High School in New Orleans, Louisiana. He played college baseball for four seasons (2012–2015) at Southeastern Louisiana University in Hammond, Louisiana.

== Professional career ==
=== Miami Marlins ===
The Miami Marlins selected Keller in the 15th round, with the 536th overall selection, of the 2015 Major League Baseball draft. He made his professional debut in 2015 with the Low–A Batavia Muckdogs, the Single–A Greensboro Grasshoppers, and the High–A Jupiter Hammerheads, accumulating a 0–3 record with a 6.26 ERA in 26 innings. He spent the 2016 season with Greensboro, going 3–2 with a 3.35 ERA in 45 innings. In 2017, he repeated the year with Greensboro, going 2–0 with a 2.28 ERA in 67 innings. His 2018 season was split between Jupiter, the Double–A Jacksonville Jumbo Shrimp, and the Triple–A New Orleans Baby Cakes, accumulating a 2–4 record with a 3.08 ERA in 52.2 innings.

On November 20, 2018, the Marlins added Keller to their 40-man roster to protect him from the Rule 5 draft. In 2019, he opened the season with Jacksonville, and was promoted to New Orleans on April 9. On August 1, 2019, the Marlins promoted Keller to the major leagues for the first time. He made his major league debut on August 4, striking out one batter over 1 2/3 innings pitched. In 10 appearances during his rookie campaign, Keller logged a 3.38 ERA with 11 strikeouts across 10 2/3 innings pitched. Keller was designated for assignment by Miami on December 20, following the signing of Yimi García.

=== Los Angeles Angels ===
On January 6, 2020, Keller was traded to the Los Angeles Angels in exchange for Jose Estrada. Keller only made two appearances for the Angels in 2020, giving up two runs in 2 1/3 innings for a 7.71 ERA with a lone strikeout. On March 31, 2021, Keller was designated for assignment by the Angels.

=== Pittsburgh Pirates ===
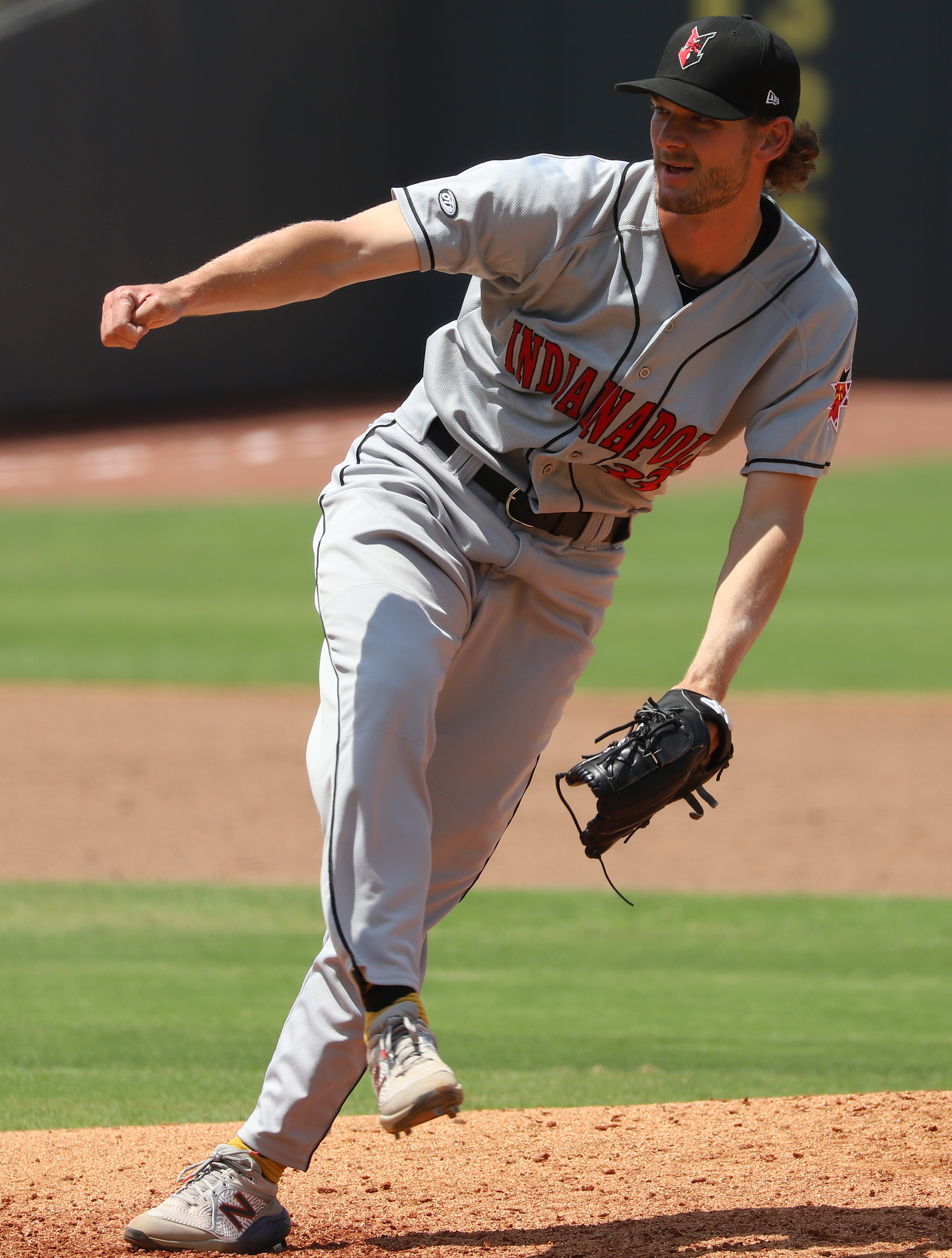
Keller with the Indianapolis Indians

On April 5, 2021, Keller was traded to the Pittsburgh Pirates in exchange for cash considerations. He made 32 appearances for the Pirates, going 1–1 with a 6.48 ERA and 36 strikeouts. On November 6, Keller was removed from the 40–man roster and sent outright to the Triple–A Indianapolis Indians. He subsequently rejected the assignment and elected free agency the next day.

=== Hanshin Tigers ===
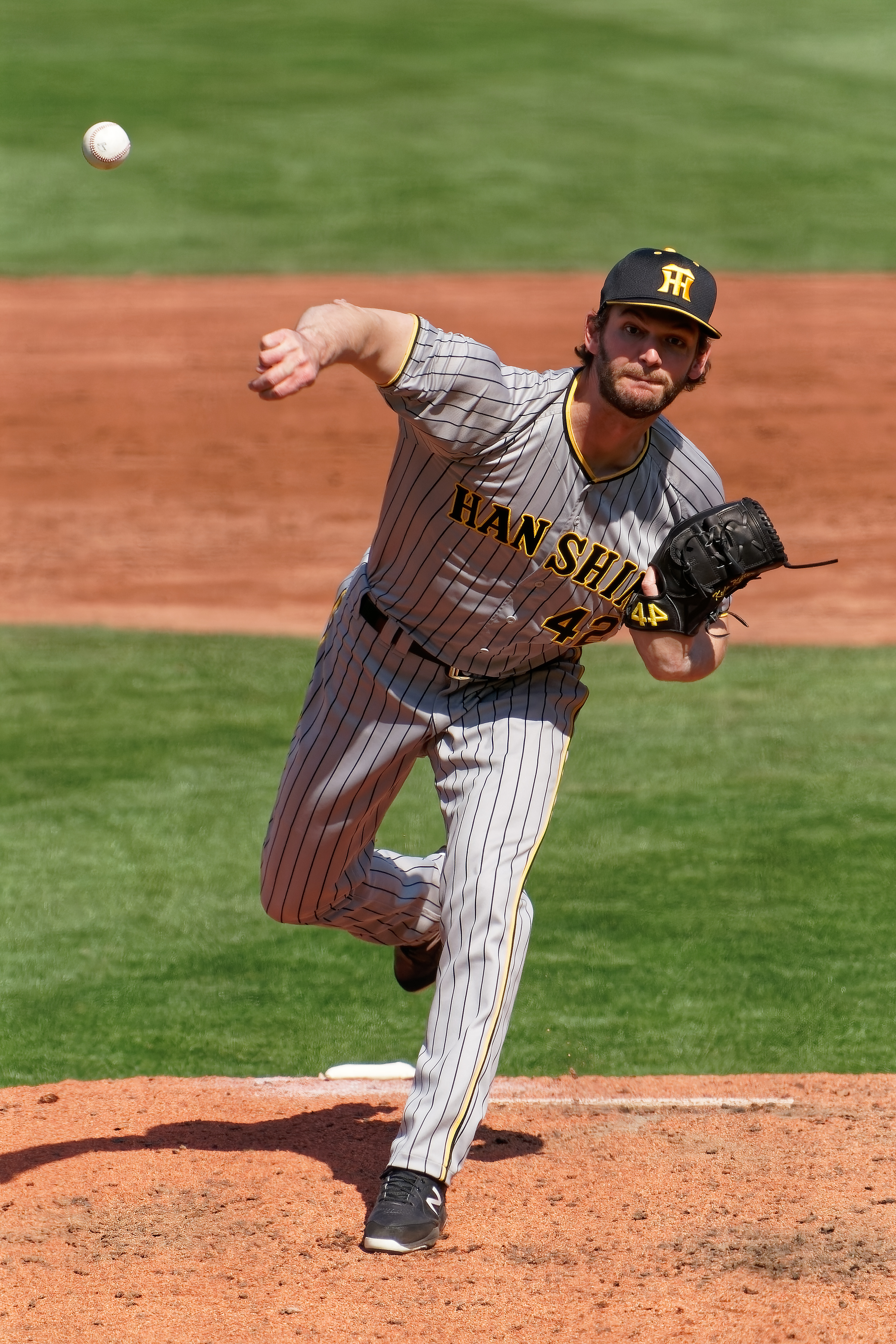
Keller with the Hanshin Tigers

On December 11, 2021, Keller signed with the Hanshin Tigers of Nippon Professional Baseball. Keller was mainly used as a relief pitcher during the 2022 season, posting a 3-2 record and 3.31 ERA with 46 strikeouts and three saves across 32 2/3 innings pitched.

Keller made 27 appearances for the Tigers in the 2023 campaign, compiling a 1-0 record and 1.71 ERA with 28 strikeouts and one save across 26 1/3 innings of work.

=== Yomiuri Giants ===
On December 26, 2023, Keller signed with the Yomiuri Giants of Nippon Professional Baseball. He made 52 appearances out of the bullpen for Yomiuri in 2024, compiling a 2–2 record and 1.53 ERA with 54 strikeouts across 47 innings pitched.

On December 8, 2024, Keller re–signed with the Giants on a one–year contract. He made 45 appearances for the Giants in 2025, posting a 1-1 record and 3.11 ERA with 49 strikeouts across 46 1/3 innings pitched. Keller became a free agent following the season.

=== Boston Red Sox ===
On February 3, 2026, Keller signed a minor league contract with the Boston Red Sox. In 23 games with Triple-A Worcester Red Sox he threw 31.1 innings going 3-3 with a 4.02 ERA and 39 strikeouts. He elected free agency on November 2.
