= 2026 Los Angeles Dodgers season =

Season for the Major League Baseball team the Los Angeles Dodgers

2026 Los Angeles Dodgers
- National League West champions
- League: National League
- Division: West
- Ballpark: Uniqlo Field at Dodger Stadium
- City: Los Angeles, California
- Record: 100–62 (.617)
- Divisional place: 1st
- Owner: Guggenheim Baseball Management
- President: Stan Kasten
- President of baseball operations: Andrew Friedman
- General manager: Brandon Gomes
- Manager: Dave Roberts
- Television: Spectrum SportsNet LA (Joe Davis, Stephen Nelson, Orel Hershiser, Eric Karros, Jessica Mendoza, Dontrelle Willis, Clayton Kershaw, Kirsten Watson, David Vassegh)
- Radio: KLAC-AM; Los Angeles Dodgers Radio Network (Charley Steiner, Tim Neverett, Stephen Nelson, Rick Monday, José Mota, James Loney); KTNQ (Pepe Yñiguez, José Mota, Luis Cruz)

The 2026 Los Angeles Dodgers season was the 137th season for the Los Angeles Dodgers franchise in Major League Baseball (MLB), their 69th season in Los Angeles, California, and their 65th season playing home games at Dodger Stadium. They entered the season as the two-time defending National League champions, and two-time defending World Series champions. They failed to become the first team to three-peat since the 2000 New York Yankees, as well as the first National League team to accomplish this feat. This was the Dodgers first season since 2007 to not include pitcher Clayton Kershaw on the active roster, as he retired after the 2025 season. This was the last season for utilityman and 2025 World Series hero, Miguel Rojas, who will join the front office after the season.

With their 14th consecutive postseason appearance, the Dodgers matched the 1991–2005 Atlanta Braves for the longest consecutive postseason streak in MLB history. They clinched their 13th National League West title in 14 seasons (fifth consecutive) on September 17 with a road victory over the Cincinnati Reds. With a September 27 road win against the San Francisco Giants, they finished with 100 wins for the sixth time in the last ten seasons. They defeated the Atlanta Braves in the National League Division Series in four games and advanced to the National League Championship Series for the third year in a row, where they were swept by the eventual World Series champion Milwaukee Brewers in four games, ending their hopes of three-peating the World Series.

== Offseason ==
=== Stadium naming rights deal ===
During the off-season the Dodgers struck a five-year / $125 million+ deal with Japanese designer and retailer Uniqlo to rename the playing field at Dodger Stadium to "Uniqlo Field at Dodger Stadium".

=== Front office ===
On December 3, the Dodgers Senior Vice-President of Baseball Operations Josh Byrnes left the team to become the General Manager of the Colorado Rockies.

=== Roster departures ===
Pitcher Clayton Kershaw, who spent his entire 18-season career with the Dodgers, announced his retirement in September.

On November 2, 2025, the day after the conclusion of the 2025 World Series, six Dodgers players became free agents. This included pitchers Andrew Heaney, Michael Kopech, and Kirby Yates, infielder Miguel Rojas, outfielder Michael Conforto, and utility player Kiké Hernández. On November 6, the Dodgers designated pitcher Tony Gonsolin for assignment and outrighted pitcher Michael Grove and outfielder Justin Dean. On November 12, catcher Ben Rortvedt was claimed off waivers by the Cincinnati Reds. On November 21, the Dodgers non-tendered pitchers Nick Frasso and Evan Phillips, making them free agents. On December 29, they traded outfielder Esteury Ruiz to the Miami Marlins in exchange for minor leaguer Adriano Marrero. On February 6, the Dodgers designated pitcher Anthony Banda for assignment.

=== Roster additions ===
On November 6, 2025, the Dodgers selected the contracts of outfielder / first baseman Ryan Ward and pitcher Robinson Ortiz and added them to the 40-man roster Ortiz was traded to the Seattle Mariners on November 16. Pitcher Ronan Kopp was added to the 40-man roster on November 18. On December 5, the Dodgers announced that they had re-signed infielder Miguel Rojas on a one-year, $5.5 million contract. On December 12, they claimed outfielder Mike Siani off waivers from the Atlanta Braves. The same day, they signed relief pitcher Edwin Díaz to a three-year, $69 million contract. On January 9, they claimed infielder Ryan Fitzgerald off waivers from the Minnesota Twins. On January 13, they designated Fitzgerald for assignment and signed infielder Andy Ibáñez to a one-year, $1.2 million contract. On January 21, they designated Siani for assignment and signed outfielder Kyle Tucker to a four-year, $240 million contract. On February 3, they re-claimed Siani off waivers (from the New York Yankees) and designated Ibáñez for assignment. Pitcher Evan Phillips was re-signed for one year and $6.5 million, on February 11. The following day, they re-signed utility player Kiké Hernández to a one year, $4.5 million contract. Outfielder Jack Suwinski was claimed off waivers from the Pittsburgh Pirates on February 22.

Off-season 40-man roster moves

Departing player	Date	Transaction	New team	Arriving player	Old team	Date	Transaction
Michael Conforto	November 2	Free agent	Chicago Cubs	Robinson Ortiz	Oklahoma City Comets	November 6	Added to 40-man roster
Andrew Heaney	November 2	Free agent	N/A; Retired	Ryan Ward	Oklahoma City Comets	November 6	Added to 40-man roster
Kiké Hernández	November 2	Free agent	Los Angeles Dodgers	Ronan Kopp	Oklahoma City Comets	November 18	Added to 40-man roster
Michael Kopech	November 2	Free agent	TBA	Miguel Rojas	Los Angeles Dodgers	December 5	Free agent signing
Miguel Rojas	November 2	Free agent	Los Angeles Dodgers	Mike Siani	Atlanta Braves	December 12	Waiver claim
Kirby Yates	November 2	Free agent	Los Angeles Angels	Edwin Díaz	New York Mets	December 12	Free agent signing
Clayton Kershaw	November 2	Free agent	N/A; Retired	Ryan Fitzgerald	Minnesota Twins	January 9	Waiver claim
Justin Dean	November 6	Outrighted	San Francisco Giants	Andy Ibáñez	Detroit Tigers	January 13	Free agent signing
Tony Gonsolin	November 6	Designated for assignment	Kansas City Royals	Kyle Tucker	Chicago Cubs	January 21	Free agent signing
Michael Grove	November 6	Outrighted	Tampa Bay Rays	Mike Siani	New York Yankees	February 3	Waiver claim
Ben Rortvedt	November 12	Waiver claim	Cincinnati Reds	Ben Rortvedt	Cincinnati Reds	February 6	Waiver claim
Robinson Ortiz	November 16	Trade	Seattle Mariners	Evan Phillips	Los Angeles Dodgers	February 11	Free-agent signing
Nick Frasso	November 21	Non-tendered	Oklahoma City Comets	Kiké Hernández	Los Angeles Dodgers	February 12	Free agent signing
Evan Phillips	November 21	Non-tendered	Los Angeles Dodgers	Jack Suwinski	Pittsburgh Pirates	February 21	Waiver claim
Esteury Ruiz	December 29	Trade	Miami Marlins				
Ryan Fitzgerald	January 13	Designated for assignment	Oklahoma City Comets				
Mike Siani	January 21	Designated for assignment	New York Yankees				
Andy Ibáñez	February 3	Designated for assignment	Athletics				
Anthony Banda	February 6	Designated for assignment	Minnesota Twins				
Ben Rortvedt	February 11	Designated for assignment	New York Mets				

== Spring training ==
Spring Training non-roster invitees

Player	Position	2025 team(s)	Ref
Yency Almonte	Pitcher	South Bend Cubs (A+) / Knoxville Smokies (AA)	
Chris Campos	Pitcher	Tulsa Drillers (AA)	
Patrick Copen	Pitcher	Great Lakes Loons (A+) / Tulsa Drillers (AA)	
Carlos Durán	Pitcher	Athletics	
Jackson Ferris	Pitcher	Tulsa Drillers (AA)	
Luke Fox	Pitcher	Great Lakes Loons (A+) / Tulsa Drillers (AA)	
Nick Frasso	Pitcher	Oklahoma City Comets (AAA)	
Carson Hobbs	Pitcher	Great Lakes Loons (A+) / Tulsa Drillers (AA)	
Cole Irvin	Pitcher	Doosan Bears	
Antoine Kelly	Pitcher	Albuquerque Isotopes (AAA)	
Garrett McDaniels	Pitcher	Los Angeles Angels	
Wyatt Mills	Pitcher	Worcester Red Sox (AAA)	
José Rodríguez	Pitcher	Tulsa Drillers (AA) / Oklahoma City Comets (AAA)	
Jerming Rosario	Pitcher	Tulsa Drillers (AA)	
Ryder Ryan	Pitcher	Indianapolis Indians (AAA)	
Adam Serwinowski	Pitcher	Dayton Dragons (A+) / Great Lakes Loons (A+) / Tulsa Drillers (AA)	
Jordan Weems	Pitcher	Houston Astros	
Lucas Wepf	Pitcher	Tulsa Drillers (AA)	
Eliézer Alfonzo Jr.	Catcher	Erie SeaWolves (AA) / Toledo Mud Hens (AAA)	
Griffin Lockwood-Powell	Catcher	Tulsa Drillers (AA)	
Nelson Quiroz	Catcher	Great Lakes Loons (A+) / Tulsa Drillers (AA)	
Chuckie Robinson	Catcher	Los Angeles Dodgers	
Seby Zavala	Catcher	Worcester Red Sox (AAA)	
Santiago Espinal	Infielder	Cincinnati Reds	
Ryan Fitzgerald	Infielder	Minnesota Twins	
Matt Gorski	Infielder	Pittsburgh Pirates	
Keston Hiura	Infielder	Colorado Rockies	
Noah Miller	Infielder	Tulsa Drillers (AA) / Oklahoma City Comets (AAA)	
Nick Senzel	Infielder	Tulsa Drillers (AA) / Oklahoma City Comets (AAA)	
Josue De Paula	Outfielder	Great Lakes Loons (A+) / Tulsa Drillers (AA)	
Zach Ehrhard	Outfielder	Greenville Drive (A+) / Portland Sea Dogs (AA) / Tulsa Drillers (AA)	
Kendall George	Outfielder	Great Lakes Loons (A+)	
Zyhir Hope	Outfielder	Great Lakes Loons (A+) / Tulsa Drillers (AA)	
Chris Newell	Outfielder	Tulsa Drillers (AA)	
James Tibbs III	Outfielder	Eugene Emeralds (A+) / Portland Sea Dogs (AA) / Tulsa Drillers (AA)	

The Dodgers began spring training on February 13, 2026 at Camelback Ranch in Glendale, Arizona, with the first Cactus League game on February 21. While at Camelback Ranch, the Dodgers also played an exhibition game on March 4 against the Mexico national baseball team as part of promotion for the 2026 World Baseball Classic. They also played in three Freeway Series exhibition games against the Los Angeles Angels before beginning the regular season on March 26. On March 19, the Dodgers selected the contract of utility player Santiago Espinal and added him to the major league roster.

=== World Baseball Classic ===
Nine Dodgers players were chosen to represent countries during the World Baseball Classic. Shohei Ohtani and Yoshinobu Yamamoto for Japan, Will Smith and recently retired Clayton Kershaw for Team USA, Edwin Díaz for Puerto Rico, Hyeseong Kim for Korea, Antonio Knowles for Great Britain, Jake Gelof for Israel and Shawndrick Oduber for Netherlands. In addition several members of the Dodgers organization were listed as coaches for the tournament including Dino Ebel (USA), Jair Fernandez (Colombia), Blake Gailen (Israel), Plácido Polanco and Joel Peralta (Dominican Republic).

== Regular season ==
=== Season standings ===
==== National League West ====
NL West
Team	W	L	Pct.	GB	Home	Road
Los Angeles Dodgers	100	62	.617	—	51‍–‍30	49‍–‍32
San Diego Padres	91	71	.562	9	51‍–‍30	40‍–‍41
Arizona Diamondbacks	86	76	.531	14	45‍–‍36	41‍–‍40
San Francisco Giants	65	97	.401	35	37‍–‍44	28‍–‍53
Colorado Rockies	58	104	.358	42	32‍–‍49	26‍–‍55

==== National League Wild Card ====
Wild Card standings

Division leaders
Team	W	L	Pct.
Milwaukee Brewers	103	59	.636
Los Angeles Dodgers	100	62	.617
Atlanta Braves	94	68	.580

Wild Card teams (Top 3 teams qualify for postseason)
Team	W	L	Pct.	GB
San Diego Padres	91	71	.562	+3
Chicago Cubs	89	73	.549	+1
Philadelphia Phillies	88	74	.543	—
Arizona Diamondbacks	86	76	.531	2
Pittsburgh Pirates	82	80	.506	6
Miami Marlins	80	82	.494	8
St. Louis Cardinals	77	85	.475	11
Washington Nationals	77	85	.475	11
Cincinnati Reds	75	87	.463	13
New York Mets	74	88	.457	14
San Francisco Giants	65	97	.401	23
Colorado Rockies	58	104	.358	30

==== Record vs. opponents ====
NL Records

2026 National League record Source: MLB Standings Grid – 2026
Team	AZ	ATL	CHC	CIN	COL	LAD	MIA	MIL	NYM	PHI	PIT	SD	SF	STL	WSH	AL
Arizona	—	4–3	2–4	4–2	9–4	7–6	1–5	2–4	4–2	3–3	3–3	6–7	10–3	5–2	2–4	24–24
Atlanta	3–4	—	3–3	3–3	6–0	5–1	9–4	3–3	6–7	9–4	5–1	3–4	1–5	2–4	9–4	27–21
Chicago	4–2	3–3	—	9–4	3–3	4–2	3–3	4–9	7–0	6–1	7–6	5–1	3–3	6–7	3–3	22–26
Cincinnati	2–4	3–3	4–9	—	4–2	1–6	3–4	4–9	4–2	3–3	6–7	3–3	3–3	5–8	1–5	29–19
Colorado	4–9	0–6	3–3	2–4	—	3–10	2–5	1–5	4–2	2–4	3–3	2–11	7–6	2–4	3–4	20–28
Los Angeles	6–7	1–5	2–4	6–1	10–3	—	2–4	3–4	5–1	4–2	5–1	8–5	9–4	2–4	6–0	31–17
Miami	5–1	4–9	3–3	4–3	5–2	4–2	—	1–5	6–7	5–8	4–2	0–6	4–2	4–2	9–4	22–26
Milwaukee	4–2	3–3	9–4	9–4	5–1	4–3	5–1	—	4–2	4–2	6–7	2–4	3–4	11–2	2–4	32–16
New York	2–4	7–6	0–7	2–4	2–4	1–5	7–6	2–4	—	6–7	4–2	4–2	5–2	2–4	7–6	23–25
Philadelphia	3–3	4–9	1–6	3–3	4–2	2–4	8–5	2–4	7–6	—	5–2	6–0	4–2	4–2	9–4	26–22
Pittsburgh	3–3	1–5	6–7	7–6	3–3	1–5	2–4	7–6	2–4	2–5	—	3–3	3–3	6–7	4–3	32–16
San Diego	7–6	4–3	1–5	3–3	11–2	5–8	6–0	4–2	2–4	0–6	3–3	—	9–4	3–4	4–2	29–19
San Francisco	3–10	5–1	3–3	3–3	6–7	4–9	2–4	4–3	2–5	2–4	3–3	4–9	—	5–1	3–3	16–32
St. Louis	2–5	4–2	7–6	8–5	4–2	4–2	2–4	2–11	4–2	2–4	7–6	4–3	1–5	—	3–3	23–25
Washington	4–2	4–9	3–3	5–1	4–3	0–6	4–9	4–2	6–7	4–9	3–4	2–4	3–3	3–3	—	28–20

Updated with the results of all games through September 27, 2026.

=== Game log ===
Legend
	Dodgers win
	Dodgers loss
	Postponement
	Clinched playoff spot
	Clinched division
**Bold**	Dodgers team member

2026 Game Log: 100–62 (Home: 51–30; Road: 49–32)
March/April: 20–11 (Home: 12–6; Road: 8–5)

#	Date	Opponent	Score	Win	Loss	Save	Attendance	Record
1	March 26	Diamondbacks	**W** 8–2	**Yamamoto** (1–0)	Gallen (0–1)	—	53,712	1–0
2	March 27	Diamondbacks	**W** 5–4	**Henriquez** (1–0)	Ginkel (0–1)	**Díaz** (1)	51,540	2–0
3	March 28	Diamondbacks	**W** 3–2	**Klein** (1–0)	Morillo (0–1)	**Díaz** (2)	53,340	3–0
4	March 30	Guardians	L 2–4	Messick (1–0)	**Sasaki** (0–1)	—	52,173	3–1
5	March 31	Guardians	**W** 4–1	**Ohtani** (1–0)	Bibee (0–1)	—	53,614	4–1
6	April 1	Guardians	L 1–4	Williams (1–1)	**Yamamoto** (1–1)	—	45,556	4–2
7	April 3	@ Nationals	**W** 13–6	**Sheehan** (1–0)	Mikolas (0–2)	—	41,161	5–2
8	April 4	@ Nationals	**W** 10–5	**Glasnow** (1–0)	Irvin (1–1)	–	40,046	6–2
9	April 5	@ Nationals	**W** 8–6	**Dreyer** (1–0)	Pérez (0–1)	**Díaz** (3)	24,899	7–2
10	April 6	@ Blue Jays	**W** 14–2	**Wrobleski** (1–0)	Scherzer (1–1)	—	40,991	8–2
11	April 7	@ Blue Jays	**W** 4–1	**Yamamoto** (2–1)	Gausman (0–1)	**Díaz** (4)	40,971	9–2
12	April 8	@ Blue Jays	L 3–4	Ty. Rogers (1–0)	**Casparius** (0–1)	Hoffman (2)	37,766	9–3
13	April 10	Rangers	**W** 8–7	**Díaz** (1–0)	Latz (0–1)	—	53,675	10–3
14	April 11	Rangers	**W** 6–3	**Sheehan** (2–0)	Leiter (1–1)	**Vesia** (1)	53,617	11–3
15	April 12	Rangers	L 2–5	deGrom (1–0)	**Sasaki** (0–2)	Junis (3)	48,350	11–4
16	April 13	Mets	**W** 4–0	**Wrobleski** (2–0)	Peterson (0–3)	—	52,838	12–4
17	April 14	Mets	**W** 2–1	**Treinen** (1–0)	Raley (0–1)	**Vesia** (2)	48,138	13–4
18	April 15	Mets	**W** 8–2	**Ohtani** (2–0)	Holmes (2–2)	—	50,909	14–4
19	April 17	@ Rockies	**W** 7–1	**Glasnow** (2–0)	Sugano (1–1)	—	28,783	15–4
20	April 18	@ Rockies	L 3–4	Bernardino (2–0)	**Klein** (1–1)	Vodnik (3)	47,925	15–5
21	April 19	@ Rockies	L 6–9	Senzatela (1–0)	**Treinen** (1–1)	—	42,677	15–6
22	April 20	@ Rockies	**W** 12–3	**Wrobleski** (3–0)	Quintana (0–2)	—	27,261	16–6
23	April 21	@ Giants	L 1–3	Roupp (4–1)	**Yamamoto** (2–2)	Walker (2)	40,066	16–7
24	April 22	@ Giants	L 0–3	Mahle (1–3)	**Dreyer** (1–1)	Walker (3)	40,277	16–8
25	April 23	@ Giants	**W** 3–0	**Glasnow** (3–0)	Webb (2–3)	**Scott** (1)	38,619	17–8
26	April 24	Cubs	L 4–6	Rolison (1–0)	**Scott** (0–1)	Martin (1)	53,733	17–9
27	April 25	Cubs	**W** 12–4	**Sasaki** (1–2)	Rea (3–1)	—	53,397	18–9
28	April 26	Cubs	**W** 6–0	**Wrobleski** (4–0)	Imanaga (2–2)	—	52,060	19–9
29	April 27	Marlins	**W** 5–4	**Eder** (1–0)	Fairbanks (0–2)	—	49,918	20–9
30	April 28	Marlins	L 1–2	Junk (2–2)	**Ohtani** (2–1)	Phillips (2)	51,909	20–10
31	April 29	Marlins	L 2–3	Nardi (2–1)	**Klein** (1–2)	Faucher (1)	50,555	20–11

May: 18–10 (Home: 8–5; Road: 10–5)

#	Date	Opponent	Score	Win	Loss	Save	Attendance	Record
32	May 1	@ Cardinals	L 2–7	Liberatore (1–1)	**Sheehan** (2–1)	—	28,308	20–12
33	May 2	@ Cardinals	L 2–3	McGreevy (2–2)	**Sasaki** (1–3)	O'Brien (9)	34,323	20–13
34	May 3	@ Cardinals	**W** 4–1	**Wrobleski** (5–0)	May (3–3)	**Scott** (2)	36,423	21–13
35	May 4	@ Astros	**W** 8–3	**Yamamoto** (3–2)	Weiss (0–3)	—	35,126	22–13
36	May 5	@ Astros	L 1–2	Lambert (2–2)	**Ohtani** (2–2)	B. King (3)	37,008	22–14
37	May 6	@ Astros	**W** 12–2	**Dreyer** (2–1)	McCullers Jr. (2–3)	—	32,741	23–14
38	May 8	Braves	**W** 3–1	**Vesia** (1–0)	Sale (6–2)	**Scott** (3)	51,255	24–14
39	May 9	Braves	L 2–7	Strider (1–0)	**Snell** (0–1)	—	50,209	24–15
40	May 10	Braves	L 2–7	Elder (4–1)	**Wrobleski** (5–1)	—	49,514	24–16
41	May 11	Giants	L 3–9	Gage (3–1)	**Vesia** (1–1)	—	44,298	24–17
42	May 12	Giants	L 2–6	Houser (1–4)	**Yamamoto** (3–3)	Kilian (2)	50,029	24–18
43	May 13	Giants	**W** 4–0	**Ohtani** (3–2)	Ray (3–5)	—	48,043	25–18
44	May 14	Giants	**W** 5–2	**Sheehan** (3–1)	Roupp (5–4)	**Scott** (4)	51,048	26–18
45	May 15	@ Angels	**W** 6–0	**Henriquez** (2–0)	Kochanowicz (2–3)	—	44,887	27–18
46	May 16	@ Angels	**W** 15–2	**Wrobleski** (6–1)	Soriano (6–3)	—	44,841	28–18
47	May 17	@ Angels	**W** 10–1	**Sasaki** (2–3)	G. Rodriguez (0–1)	—	44,809	29–18
48	May 18	@ Padres	L 0–1	M. King (4–2)	**Yamamoto** (3–4)	M. Miller (15)	40,882	29–19
49	May 19	@ Padres	**W** 5–4	**Scott** (1–1)	M. Miller (1–1)	**Klein** (1)	39,788	30–19
50	May 20	@ Padres	**W** 4–0	**Ohtani** (4–2)	Vásquez (5–2)	—	41,888	31–19
51	May 22	@ Brewers	L 1–5	Henderson (2–1)	**Wrobleski** (6–2)	Patrick (2)	36,446	31–20
52	May 23	@ Brewers	**W** 11–3	**Sasaki** (3–3)	Gasser (0–1)	—	38,136	32–20
53	May 24	@ Brewers	**W** 5–1	**Yamamoto** (4–4)	Sproat (1–3)	—	40,973	33–20
54	May 25	Rockies	**W** 5–3	**Hurt** (1–0)	Bernardino (2–3)	**Treinen** (1)	48,778	34–20
55	May 26	Rockies	**W** 15–6	**Lauer** (2–5)	Freeland (1–6)	—	52,148	35–20
56	May 27	Rockies	**W** 4–1	**Ohtani** (5–2)	Sugano (4–4)	**Hurt** (1)	50,832	36–20
57	May 29	Phillies	**W** 4–2	**Wrobleski** (7–2)	Wheeler (4–1)	**Scott** (5)	50,834	37–20
58	May 30	Phillies	L 3–4	Kerkering (3–0)	**Scott** (1–2)	Duran (12)	51,794	37–21
59	May 31	Phillies	**W** 9–1	**Yamamoto** (5–4)	Painter (1–6)	—	50,677	38–21

June: 18–9 (Home: 6–3; Road: 12–6)

#	Date	Opponent	Score	Win	Loss	Save	Attendance	Record
60	June 1	@ Diamondbacks	L 1–4	Clarke (2–1)	**Sheehan** (3–2)	Sewald (15)	31,410	38–22
61	June 2	@ Diamondbacks	**W** 6–5	**Treinen** (2–1)	Soroka (7–3)	**Scott** (6)	32,829	39–22
62	June 3	@ Diamondbacks	**W** 7–0	**Ohtani** (6–2)	Gallen (3–5)	—	36,213	40–22
63	June 4	@ Diamondbacks	L 2–3	Sewald (2–4)	**Scott** (1–3)	—	41,999	40–23
64	June 5	Angels	**W** 1–0	**Treinen** (3–1)	Yates (0–2)	—	46,850	41–23
65	June 6	Angels	**W** 9–2	**Yamamoto** (6–4)	Kochanowicz (2–5)	—	53,448	42–23
66	June 7	Angels	L 5–13	Soriano (7–4)	**Sheehan** (3–3)	—	49,535	42–24
67	June 9	@ Pirates	**W** 12–3	**Klein** (2–2)	Dotel (1–1)	—	30,646	43–24
68	June 10	@ Pirates	L 8–9	Sisk (1–0)	**Hurt** (1–1)	Soto (9)	30,626	43–25
69	June 11	@ Pirates	**W** 8–6	**Dreyer** (3–1)	Keller (5–4)	**Scott** (7)	30,660	44–25
70	June 12	@ White Sox	L 2–8	Kay (6–1)	**Sasaki** (3–4)	—	37,882	44–26
71	June 13	@ White Sox	**W** 7–1	**Yamamoto** (7–4)	Burke (3–4)	—	37,832	45–26
72	June 14	@ White Sox	L 4–6	Fedde (2–5)	**Sheehan** (3–4)	Domínguez (12)	38,507	45–27
73	June 15	Rays	**W** 4–3	**Hurt** (2–1)	Matz (4–4)	**Scott** (8)	53,911	46–27
74	June 16	Rays	**W** 1–0	**Wrobleski** (8–2)	Rasmussen (6–2)	**Scott** (9)	49,070	47–27
75	June 17	Rays	**W** 5–4	**Ohtani** (7–2)	Kelly (4–3)	**Vesia** (3)	50,705	48–27
76	June 19	Orioles	**W** 6–5	**Treinen** (4–1)	Helsley (0–3)	—	51,939	49–27
77	June 20	Orioles	L 2–3	Tr. Rogers (4–7)	**Yamamoto** (7–5)	Canó (1)	50,538	49–28
78	June 21	Orioles	L 1–12	Young (6–2)	**Sheehan** (3–5)	—	50,215	49–29
79	June 22	@ Twins	**W** 2–1	**Lauer** (3–5)	Matthews (3–5)	**Scott** (10)	35,244	50–29
80	June 23	@ Twins	**W** 12–3	**Wrobleski** (9–2)	Voth (0–1)	—	30,117	51–29
81	June 24	@ Twins	**W** 4–3	**Ohtani** (8–2)	Ryan (5–4)	**Scott** (11)	39,853	52–29
82	June 26	@ Padres	L 1–7	Buehler (5–3)	**Sasaki** (3–5)	—	43,153	52–30
83	June 27	@ Padres	**W** 15–3	**Yamamoto** (8–5)	Vásquez (6–6)	—	45,159	53–30
84	June 28	@ Padres	**W** 4–2	**Sheehan** (4–5)	M. King (5–7)	**Henriquez** (1)	41,189	54–30
85	June 29	@ Athletics	**W** 9–4	**Lauer** (4–5)	Jump (3–2)	—	12,394	55–30
86	June 30	@ Athletics	**W** 9–3	**Wrobleski** (10–2)	Springs (3–8)	—	12,387	56–30

July: 13–11 (Home: 7–7; Road: 6–4)

#	Date	Opponent	Score	Win	Loss	Save	Attendance	Record
87	July 1	@ Athletics	L 1–7	Ginn (7–4)	**Barnes** (0–1)	—	12,592	56–31
88	July 2	Padres	**W** 12–7	**Klein** (3–2)	Peralta (1–1)	—	54,081	57–31
89	July 3	Padres	**W** 4–3	**Hurt** (3–1)	Morejón (6–2)	**Scott** (12)	49,578	58–31
90	July 4	Padres	**W** 3–0	**Yamamoto** (9–5)	Canning (1–6)	**Klein** (2)	52,284	59–31
91	July 5	Padres	L 2–5	Sears (2–1)	**Sheehan** (4–6)	M. Miller (22)	46,506	59–32
92	July 6	Rockies	**W** 8–7 (11)	**Henriquez** (3–0)	Herget (0–3)	—	48,245	60–32
93	July 7	Rockies	L 3–4	Mejia (2–6)	**Klein** (3–3)	Romano (6)	47,806	60–33
94	July 8	Rockies	**W** 4–3	**Henriquez** (4–0)	Senzatela (8–1)	**Scott** (13)	49,996	61–33
95	July 10	Diamondbacks	L 3–9	Rodríguez (8–3)	**Klein** (3–4)	—	47,727	61–34
96	July 11	Diamondbacks	L 2–9	Pfaadt (3–1)	**Yamamoto** (9–6)	—	48,102	61–35
97	July 12	Diamondbacks	L 3–5	Thompson (4–2)	**Henriquez** (4–1)	Sewald (22)	47,967	61–36
–	July 14	96th All-Star Game	American League vs. National League (Citizens Bank Park, Philadelphia, Pennsylvania)					
98	July 17	@ Yankees	**W** 2–1	**Dreyer** (4–1)	Cole (3–5)	**Scott** (14)	46,450	62–36
–	July 18	@ Yankees	Postponed (rain); Makeup: July 19					
99	July 19 (1)	@ Yankees	**W** 8–2	**Yamamoto** (10–6)	Schlittler (9–6)	—	43,305	63–36
100	July 19 (2)	@ Yankees	L 1–2	Bednar (4–3)	**Phillips** (0–1)	—	43,378	63–37
101	July 20	@ Phillies	L 7–10	Sánchez (12–4)	**Sheehan** (4–7)	—	40,265	63–38
102	July 21	@ Phillies	**W** 2–1	**Wrobleski** (11–2)	Wheeler (10–2)	**Scott** (15)	40,077	64–38
103	July 22	@ Phillies	**W** 9–5	**Lauer** (5–5)	Nola (3–8)	—	40,675	65–38
104	July 24	@ Mets	**W** 4–2	**Sasaki** (4–5)	Raley (4–5)	**Scott** (16)	35,338	66–38
105	July 25	@ Mets	**W** 4–3	**Yamamoto** (11–6)	McLean (7–7)	**Stewart** (1)	36,356	67–38
106	July 26	@ Mets	L 3–8	Pérez (4–3)	**Phillips** (0–2)	—	34,566	67–39
107	July 28	Mariners	L 6–7	Ferrer (4–1)	**Stewart** (0–1)	Muñoz (19)	51,686	67–40
108	July 29	Mariners	**W** 4–2	**Lauer** (6–5)	Hancock (6–5)	**Díaz** (5)	46,065	68–40
109	July 30	Mariners	**W** 6–2	**Sasaki** (5–5)	Woo (7–8)	—	52,378	69–40
110	July 31	Red Sox	L 4–9	Bello (3–6)	**Irvin** (0–1)	—	47,903	69–41

August: 13–14 (Home: 7–5; Road: 6–9)

#	Date	Opponent	Score	Win	Loss	Save	Attendance	Record
111	August 1	Red Sox	L 2–3	Slaten (2–4)	**Yamamoto** (11–7)	Chapman (27)	49,291	69–42
112	August 2	Red Sox	L 4–8	Bennett (7–4)	**Sheehan** (4–8)	—	46,834	69–43
113	August 3	@ Cubs	L 5–10	Boyd (7–1)	**Wrobleski** (11–3)	—	39,384	69–44
114	August 4	@ Cubs	L 1–5	Rolison (6–1)	**Skubal** (7–6)	—	40,584	69–45
115	August 5	@ Cubs	L 6–7	Imanaga (8–9)	**Lauer** (6–6)	Webb (6)	38,691	69–46
116	August 7	@ Diamondbacks	L 3–4	Ginkel (5–3)	**Díaz** (1–1)	—	46,172	69–47
117	August 8	@ Diamondbacks	**W** 2–1 (10)	**Díaz** (2–1)	Carrillo (2–1)	**Dreyer** (1)	46,213	70–47
118	August 9	@ Diamondbacks	L 2–4	Rodríguez (11–4)	**Wrobleski** (11–4)	—	43,775	70–48
119	August 10	Royals	**W** 6–5	**Dreyer** (5–1)	Lange (1–7)	**Díaz** (6)	51,799	71–48
120	August 11	Royals	**W** 5–4 (10)	**Halvorsen** (1–1)	Erceg (4–4)	—	49,958	72–48
121	August 12	Royals	**W** 4–2	**Lauer** (7–6)	Lynch IV (4–4)	**Knack** (1)	47,578	73–48
122	August 13	Brewers	L 4–5	Hall (2–0)	**Díaz** (2–2)	Megill (22)	46,105	73–49
123	August 14	Brewers	**W** 3–1	**Yamamoto** (12–7)	Gasser (3–5)	**Díaz** (7)	47,066	74–49
124	August 15	Brewers	L 1–4	Misiorowski (12–5)	**Wrobleski** (11–5)	Ashby (1)	47,767	74–50
125	August 16	Brewers	L 2–6	Henderson (7–2)	**Skubal** (7–7)	—	45,828	74–51
126	August 17	@ Rockies	**W** 11–5	**Snell** (1–1)	Sugano (12–6)	—	34,609	75–51
127	August 18	@ Rockies	**W** 7–6	**Lauer** (8–6)	Feltner (5–7)	**Scott** (17)	29,898	76–51
128	August 19	@ Rockies	**W** 6–4 (10)	**Hurt** (4–1)	Herget (0–5)	**Scott** (18)	33,179	77–51
129	August 21	Pirates	**W** 5–4 (10)	**Phillips** (1–2)	Soto (5–4)	—	51,872	78–51
130	August 22	Pirates	**W** 4–3	**Skubal** (8–7)	Ramírez (6–4)	**Scott** (19)	53,417	79–51
131	August 23	Pirates	**W** 4–0	**Snell** (2–1)	Bachar (1–3)	—	44,092	80–51
132	August 25	@ Braves	L 3–4	Dodd (4–1)	**Scott** (1–4)	Iglesias (28)	36,832	80–52
133	August 26	@ Braves	L 5–6	Mederos (3–1)	**Scott** (1–5)	—	37,227	80–53
134	August 27	@ Braves	L 0–1	Sale (13–9)	**Yamamoto** (12–8)	—	39,650	80–54
135	August 28	@ Tigers	**W** 2–1	**Phillips** (2–2)	Waguespack (1–2)	**Scott** (20)	41,012	81–54
136	August 29	@ Tigers	L 1–2	Jansen (4–5)	**Dreyer** (5–2)	—	40,022	81–55
137	August 30	@ Tigers	**W** 6–1	**Glasnow** (4–0)	Valdez (8–10)	—	35,387	82–55

September: 18–7 (Home: 11–4; Road: 7–3)

#	Date	Opponent	Score	Win	Loss	Save	Attendance	Record
138	September 1	Cardinals	L 8–13	McGreevy (6–9)	**Lauer** (8–7)	—	44,593	82–56
139	September 2	Cardinals	L 6–8 (10)	Bruihl (1–1)	**Stewart** (0–2)	O'Brien (35)	45,900	82–57
140	September 3	Cardinals	**W** 3–2	**Stewart** (1–2)	O'Brien (3–7)	—	45,150	83–57
141	September 4	Nationals	**W** 5–3	**Snell** (3–1)	Kent (1–3)	**Dreyer** (2)	49,847	84–57
142	September 5	Nationals	**W** 6–5	**Vesia** (2–1)	Beeter (5–5)	**Scott** (21)	52,785	85–57
143	September 6	Nationals	**W** 7–5	**B. Miller** (1–0)	Dion (1–2)	**Henriquez** (2)	54,211	86–57
144	September 7	Reds	**W** 6–3	**Sheehan** (5–8)	Williamson (3–4)	**Phillips** (1)	50,293	87–57
145	September 8	Reds	**W** 3–2	**Skubal** (9–7)	Lodolo (3–4)	**Scott** (22)	48,439	88–57
146	September 9	Reds	**W** 14–1	**Yamamoto** (13–8)	Lowder (6–10)	—	45,252	89–57
147	September 11	@ Marlins	**W** 6–2	**Snell** (4–1)	Gusto (1–5)	—	29,370	90–57
148	September 12	@ Marlins	L 3–4	Gibson (4–1)	**Glasnow** (4–1)	Fairbanks (19)	34,814	90–58
149	September 13	@ Marlins	L 4–6	Fulton (2–0)	**Scott** (1–6)	—	32,003	90–59
150	September 14	@ Reds	**W** 4–1	**Skubal** (10–7)	Lodolo (3–5)	—	22,807	91–59
151	September 15	@ Reds	**W** 4–0	**Yamamoto** (14–8)	Lowder (6–11)	—	25,341	92–59
152	September 16	@ Reds	L 2–6	Antone (3–2)	**Halvorsen** (1–2)	—	20,151	92–60
153	September 17	@ Reds	**W** 8–2	**Knack** (1–0)	Singer (6–15)	—	24,169	93–60
154	September 18	Giants	**W** 8–2	**Glasnow** (5–1)	Foley (3–2)	—	48,145	94–60
155	September 19	Giants	**W** 10–4	**Skubal** (11–7)	Marte (0–1)	—	47,410	95–60
156	September 20	Giants	**W** 3–1	**Bubic** (4–2)	Hentges (1–7)	**Scott** (23)	48,085	96–60
157	September 22	Padres	**W** 7–0	**Wrobleski** (12–5)	M. King (12–10)	—	46,066	97–60
158	September 23	Padres	L 1–5	Rodríguez (4–3)	**Yamamoto** (14–9)	—	48,201	97–61
159	September 24	Padres	L 2–4	Matsui (4–1)	**Glasnow** (5–2)	M. Miller (38)	53,027	97–62
160	September 25	@ Giants	**W** 2–0	**Skubal** (12–7)	Marte (0–2)	**Scott** (24)	40,770	98–62
161	September 26	@ Giants	**W** 4–3	**Phillips** (3–2)	Harris (0–1)	**Scott** (25)	40,124	99–62
162	September 27	@ Giants	**W** 5–1 (10)	**Vesia** (3–1)	Davitt (0–1)	—	40,145	100–62

=== Season summary ===
Opening Day starting lineup
No.	Player	Pos.
Batters
17	Shohei Ohtani	DH
23	Kyle Tucker	RF
50	Mookie Betts	SS
5	Freddie Freeman	1B
16	Will Smith	C
13	Max Muncy	3B
37	Teoscar Hernández	LF
44	Andy Pages	CF
72	Miguel Rojas	2B
Starting pitcher
18	Yoshinobu Yamamoto	

=== March ===
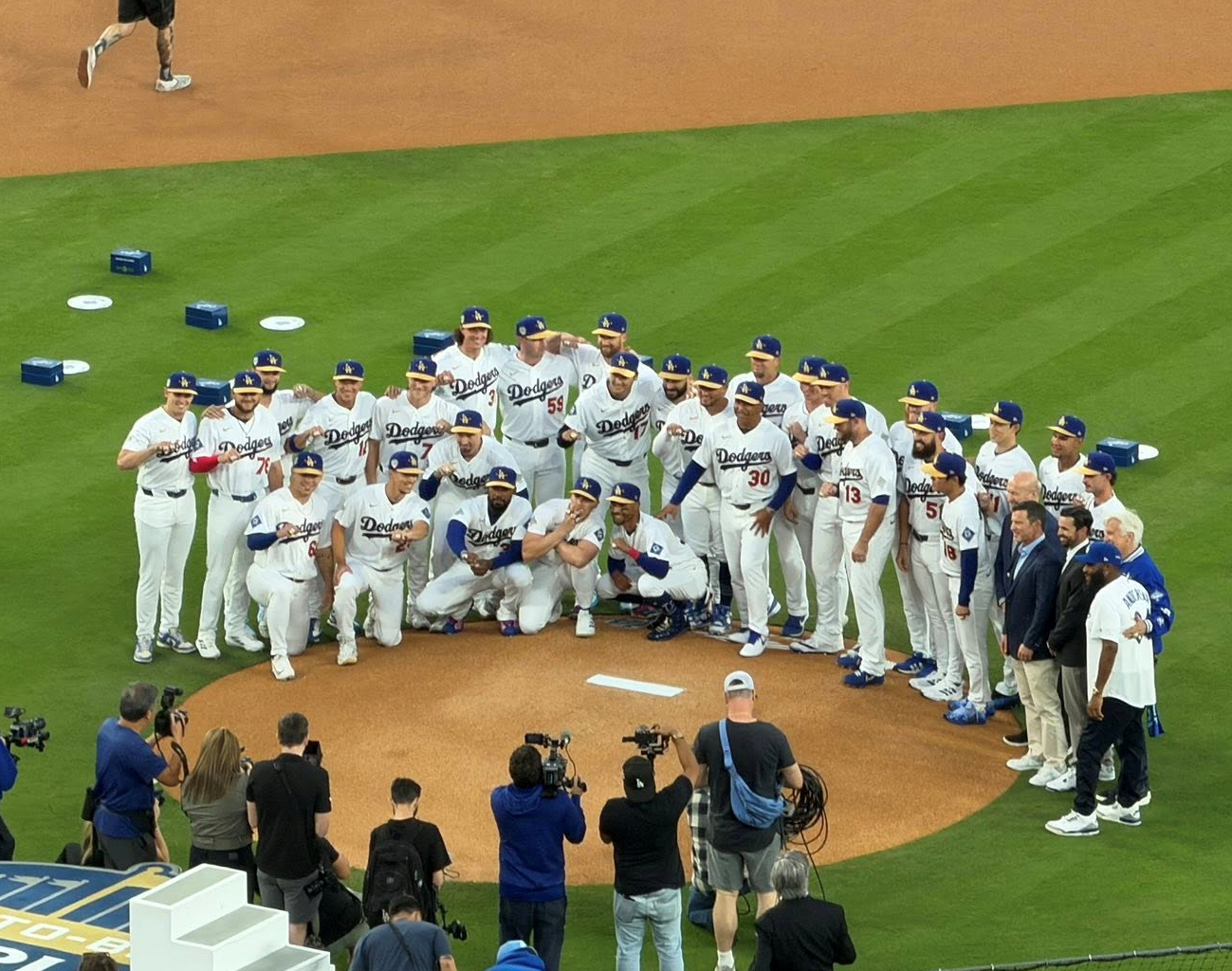
The Dodgers received their 2025 World Series rings on March 27 before their game against the Diamondbacks.

The Dodgers began the season with a three-game series against the Arizona Diamondbacks at the newly re-named Uniqlo Field at Dodger Stadium. Yoshinobu Yamamoto made his second straight opening day start, allowing two runs on five hits with six strikeouts while Andy Pages and Will Smith each homered in the 8–2 win. The following day, the Dodgers scored four runs in the third on a solo homer by Alex Freeland and a three-run homer by Mookie Betts. The game was tied when Kyle Tucker drove in Freeland with the eventual winning run as the Dodgers won 5–4. They finished off the opening series sweep with a 3–2 win in the series finale. Tyler Glasnow allowed two runs in six innings with six strikeouts and the Dodgers took the lead with a two-run home run by Smith in the eighth inning. The Cleveland Guardians came to town next and handed the Dodgers their first loss of the season, 4–2. In the following game, Shohei Ohtani allowed only one hit while striking out six in six scoreless innings as the Dodgers won 4–1.

=== April ===
In the second game of the series, Yamamoto allowed two runs in six innings but Cleveland got home runs from Gabriel Arias in the third and José Ramírez in the eighth to win 4–1. The Dodgers became the first major league team to have three Japanese-born pitchers in consecutive games (Roki Sasaki, Ohtani and Yamamoto).

The Dodgers went on their first road trip of the season on April 3 to play the Washington Nationals at Nationals Park. Emmet Sheehan allowed four runs in 5 2/3 innings while the Dodgers hit five home runs in a 13–6 win. The following day, Glasnow allowed two runs while striking out nine in six innings, Pages had three hits (including a three run home run) and Freddie Freeman had two doubles and four RBI in a 10–5 win. In the series finale, the Dodgers scored four runs in the eighth inning to come from behind and finish off the sweep with a 8–6 win. Next up was a three-game series against the Toronto Blue Jays at Rogers Centre, a rematch of the 2025 World Series. Justin Wrobleski started the opener for the Dodgers, allowing one run on two hits in five innings. Dalton Rushing had four hits (including two home runs) while the Dodgers hit three additional homers in a 14–2 win. Yamamoto allowed only one run in six innings the following day as the Dodgers won, 4–1. In the series finale, Ohtani allowed only one unearned run in six innings but the Blue Jays scored three runs in the seventh and eighth off the Dodgers bullpen to beat them 4–3.

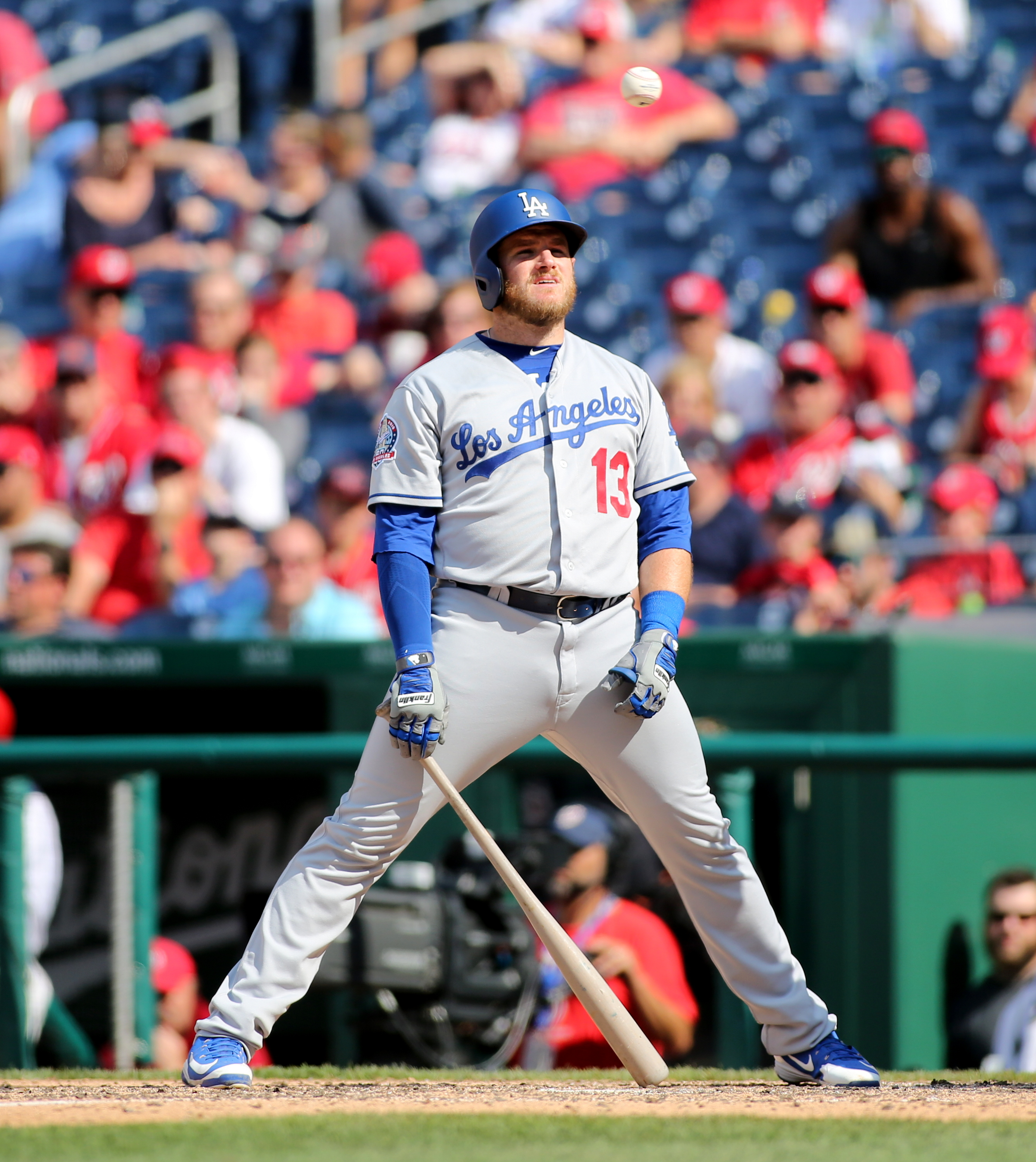
Muncy hit three home runs in a game on April 10.

Back in Los Angeles on April 10, against the Texas Rangers, Pages had three hits, including a double and a home run, and Max Muncy hit three home runs, including a walk-off as the Dodgers won 8–7. He was only the second Dodger to hit three and a walk-off, joining Don Demeter, who did it in 1959. In the next game, the Dodgers scored four runs in the first inning on a lead-off homer by Ohtani and a three-run homer by Teoscar Hernández and they won the game 6–3. The Rangers won the final game of the series, 5–2. Jacob deGrom allowed only one run in six innings while striking out nine. The next series brought the New York Mets to Los Angeles. Wrobleski allowed only two hits in eight scoreless innings and Pages hit a three-run home run in a 4–0 Dodgers victory to start things off. In the next game, Yamamoto allowed only one run (a solo home run by Francisco Lindor to open the game) on four hits in 7 1/3 innings while striking out seven. Nolan McLean matched him with one run on two hits in seven innings with eight strikeouts. The Dodgers won 2–1 on an RBI single by Kyle Tucker in the eighth inning. The following day, Ohtani allowed one run on two hits in six innings with 10 strike outs, Rushing hit a grand slam home run and the Dodgers finished off a sweep with a 8–2 win.

The Dodgers next traveled to Coors Field to play the Colorado Rockies, beginning on April 17. Glasnow struck out seven while allowing only two hits and one run in seven innings while Muncy hit two home runs in a 7–1 Dodgers win. Next, the Dodgers took a 3–2 lead after the second inning thanks to home runs by Tucker and Rushing, but the Rockies came back to score two in the sixth and held on to win 4–3. The Rockies won again the next day, 9–6, handing the Dodgers their first back-to-back losses of the season. The Dodgers did win the follow day, to gain a split of the series with the Rockies, 12–3. Wrobleski allowed one run in seven innings and both Muncy and Rushing had two home runs in the game. On April 22, the Dodgers began a three game series against the San Francisco Giants at Oracle Park. In the opener, the Giants held the Dodgers offense in check in a 3–1 win. The next game, Ohtani struck out seven in six scoreless innings but a three-run home run by Patrick Bailey in the seventh was all the Giants needed in a 3–0 win. Ohtani's season-opening on base streak ended at 53 consecutive games, which tied the Los Angeles era franchise record set by Shawn Green. The Dodgers avoided a sweep with a 3–0 win of their own in the finale. Glasnow struck out nine and allowed only one hit in eight scoreless innings.

Back home on April 24, the Dodgers took on the Chicago Cubs in a three-game series. Emmet Sheehan held the Cubs to only one run in 6 1/3 innings while striking out 10 batters while Will Smith hit a three-run home run in the third to give the Dodgers an early lead. However, the Cubs came back against the Dodgers bullpen and a two-run homer by Dansby Swanson in the ninth gave them a 6–4 win. In the following game, the Dodgers scored 12 runs on 14 hits in a 12–4 victory. Ohtani had three hits, including a home run, in the series finale while Wrobleski pitched six scoreless innings in the Dodgers 6–0 win. The Miami Marlins came to town next and a Liam Hicks three-run home run off Yamamoto in the fifth inning gave them a 4–2 lead going into the ninth. However, a ground-rule double by Ohtani and a two-run single by Tucker led to a 5–4 walkoff win for the Dodgers. The following day, Ohtani struck out nine Marlins in six innings but the Dodgers lost 2–1. The Marlins took the series with a 3–2 win in the series finale. An RBI single by Javier Sanoja in the eighth was the go-ahead run.

=== May ===
The Dodgers began the month of May by playing the St. Louis Cardinals at Busch Stadium. In the opener, a Nolan Gorman home run in the first gave the Cardinals a 3–0 lead and they never looked back, winning 7–2. In the next game, a Alec Burleson double and a Jordan Walker home run in the third inning also gave the Cardinals a 3–0 lead as they won again, 3–2 and handed the Dodgers their fourth straight loss. Justin Wrobleski pitched six scoreless innings on May 3 as the Dodgers won 4–1 to snap the losing streak. Next up was the Houston Astros at Daikin Park. Alex Freeland had three hits, including a home run, and Kyle Tucker had two hits and a home run as the Dodgers won 8–3. Shohei Ohtani struck out eight in seven innings in the following game but allowed two solo home runs, which was enough to sink the Dodgers, 2–1. The Dodgers finished out the series with a 12–2 victory over the Astros on May 6. Andy Pages hit three home runs in the game.

Back home on May 8, the Dodgers beat the Atlanta Braves, 3–1. Freddie Freeman hit his 100th home run as a Dodger in the game. Blake Snell made his first start of the season on May 9, after starting the season on the injured list. It did not go well as he allowed five runs on six hits in three innings as the Braves won 7–2. They also lost by an identical, 7–2 score the next day. The Dodgers woes continued as the San Francisco Giants came to town the next day and beat them 9–3. Eric Haase hit two home runs as the Dodgers lost, 6–2, in the next game. It was the first time since 1936, and only second time ever, that the Dodgers had lost four straight games by four or more runs. Ohtani struck out eight in seven scoreless innings the following day as the Dodgers ended the losing streak with a 4–0 win. In the series finale, Emmet Sheehan struck out six in six innings and Will Smith homered as the Dodgers won 5–2.

On May 15, the Dodgers traveled to Angel Stadium to play the Los Angeles Angels. Andy Pages hit a three-run homer, followed by a solo homer by Max Muncy in the fourth inning and the Dodgers shut out the Angels, 6–0. With Snell going back on the injured list before the game, the Dodgers used eight different relief pitchers to get through the game. The next day, the Dodgers scored 15 runs on 10 hits and two errors in a 15–2 rout of the Angels. Ohtani had five RBI while hitting a double and a triple. Roki Sasaki struck out eight in seven innings while only giving up one run on four hits and the Dodgers finished a sweep of the Angels with a 10–1 win. The next series was at Petco Park against the San Diego Padres. Yoshinobu Yamamoto struck out eight while allowing only one run (a solo homer by the second batter of the game, Miguel Andújar) on three hits. However, the Dodgers were shut out by Michael King and two relievers and lost 1–0. Freddie Freeman had two home runs in the following game and as the Dodgers came from behind and beat the Padres 5–4 on a sacrifice fly by Pages in the eighth inning. In the series finale, Ohtani pitched five scoreless innings and also homered in a 4–0 shutout. The Dodgers traveled on May 22 to play the Milwaukee Brewers at American Family Field. William Contreras hit a three-run home run in the first inning off Wrobleski and the Brewers won the opener, 5–1. The Dodgers got even with a 11–3 win the following day.Teoscar Hernández had three hits, including a home run, and drove in six runs. In that game, the Dodgers bullpen set a new franchise record for scoreless innings with 36 in a row, breaking the previous mark set in the 1998 season. The Dodgers finished off the series with a 7–1 win. Yamamoto allowed only the one run in seven innings while Pages homered in the game.

The Dodgers returned home on Memorial Day to play the Colorado Rockies. Emmet Sheehan struck out eight batters in six innings and the Dodgers scored four runs in the seventh to win 5–3. The next day, Eric Lauer, recently acquired in a trade from the Toronto Blue Jays, made his Dodgers debut and allowed one run in six innings as the starting pitcher. Mookie Betts had three hits with two home runs, Pages had two doubles and a homer and the Dodgers won 15–6. On May 27, Ohtani struck out seven and did not allow a hit in six innings and the Dodgers as a team only allowed one hit in the game as they beat the Rockies to finish off the sweep, 4–1. The next series was against the Philadelphia Phillies. In the opener, Wrobleski struck out nine in seven innings and the Dodgers hit four solo home runs for a 4–2 win. In the next game, Betts had three hits including a double and Sasaki struck out seven while only allowing one run on three hits in 5 1/3 innings. However, the Phillies scored three runs in the ninth, with a go-ahead two run homer by Edmundo Sosa giving them a 4–3 win. The month ended with a 9–1 victory over the Phillies. Yamamoto struck out 10 in 5 1/3 scoreless innings while the Dodgers hit three home runs (including the first major league homer by Ryan Ward).

=== June ===
The Dodgers started June with a road series against the Arizona Diamondbacks at Chase Field. The Diamondbacks scored four runs (on three home runs) from the sixth to eighth innings to win 4–1. The Dodgers jumped out to a 4–0 lead the following day and then held on for a 6–5 win. Shohei Ohtani pitched six scoreless innings and Kyle Tucker hit a two-run home run as the Dodgers shut out the Diamondbacks, 7–0, in the following game. Justin Wrobleski pitched six shutout innings but the Diamondbacks won the last game of the series, 3–2, thanks to a walk-off home run by Ketel Marte.

The Dodgers returned home on June 5 for a weekend series against the Los Angeles Angels. Roki Sasaki struck out 10 while only allowing two hits in seven shutout innings while a Freddie Freeman walk-off home run games the Dodgers the 1–0 win in the series opener. In the second game, the Dodgers won 9–2, with all nine runs scored in the first inning. In the final game of the series, Sebastián Rivero had five hits in five at bats with six RBI as the Angels won, 13–5.

The next road trip began on June 9, against the Pittsburgh Pirates at PNC Park. They scored 10 runs in the seventh inning to win 12–2. In the next game, Ryan Ward hit his first career grand slam home run to give the Dodgers the lead, but Tyler Callihan hit two home runs as the Pirates came from behind to win 9–8. The Dodgers won 8–6 in the series finale. The road trip moved to Rate Field for a series against the Chicago White Sox. Roki Sasaki gave up seven runs in the fifth as the Dodgers dropped the series opener, 8–2. On June 13, Yoshinobu Yamamoto took a perfect game into the eighth inning and a no-hitter into the ninth before allowing a solo home run to Tristan Peters to lead off the inning. Ohtani hit a lead-off home run and Max Muncy added two as the Dodgers won, 7–1. Emmet Sheehan struck out eight while allowing only on hit through the first five innings of the series finale. However, Sam Antonacci led off the sixth with a solo home run and then the White Sox hit two home runs off reliver Jack Dreyer, part of six runs in the inning to win the game, 6–4.

The next home series began with three-games against the Tampa Bay Rays. The Rays opened the game with a two-run first inning home run by Ryan Vilade and took a 3–0 lead in the second only for the Dodgers to tie it with a three-run Kyle Tucker homer in the bottom of the inning. A pinch-hit solo homer by Miguel Rojas in the seventh broke the tie and gave the Dodgers a 4–3 win. In the next game, a solo homerun by Ohtani in the sixth inning accounted for all the scoring in a 1–0 Dodgers win. The Dodgers finished off the series sweep with a 5–4 win. Freeman's two-run sixth inning home run was the difference. Next up was the Baltimore Orioles. The Dodgers took an early 3–0 lead, fell behind 5–3 after the Orioles scored all their runs in the sixth and seventh innings, and then won 6–5 on a solo homer by Mookie Betts and a two-run walk-off hit by Dalton Rushing. The Orioles won the next game, 3–2, as the Dodgers ninth inning rally fell short. The Orioles blew out the Dodgers on June 21, 12–1, to take the series.

The Dodgers traveled to Target Field to play the Minnesota Twins and took the opener of that series, 2–1. Solo home runs by Ohtani and Freeman accounted for both of the runs. The following game, Wrobleski allowed two runs in seven innings while the Dodgers offense came alive and they won 12–3. The Dodgers finished off a sweep of the series with a 4–3 win on June 24. Ohtani struck out sight in six innings and Betts hit his 300th career home run. After an off-day, they began a weekend series against the San Diego Padres at Petco Park with a 7–1 defeat. In the next game, Kyle Tucker had three hits, including a home run, and four RBI as the Dodgers scored nine runs in the sixth enroute to a 15–3 win. The Dodgers took the series finale, 4–2, with Betts driving in two runs on a hit in the fifth. Next up was a series at Sutter Health Park against the Athletics. The Dodgers recorded 17 hits, three of which were home runs, in a 9–4 win. the next day, Wrobleski struck out 11 batters in seven innings as the Dodgers won 9–3. It was the 1,000th career win for manager Dave Roberts, the fastest to reach that mark in MLB history.

=== July ===
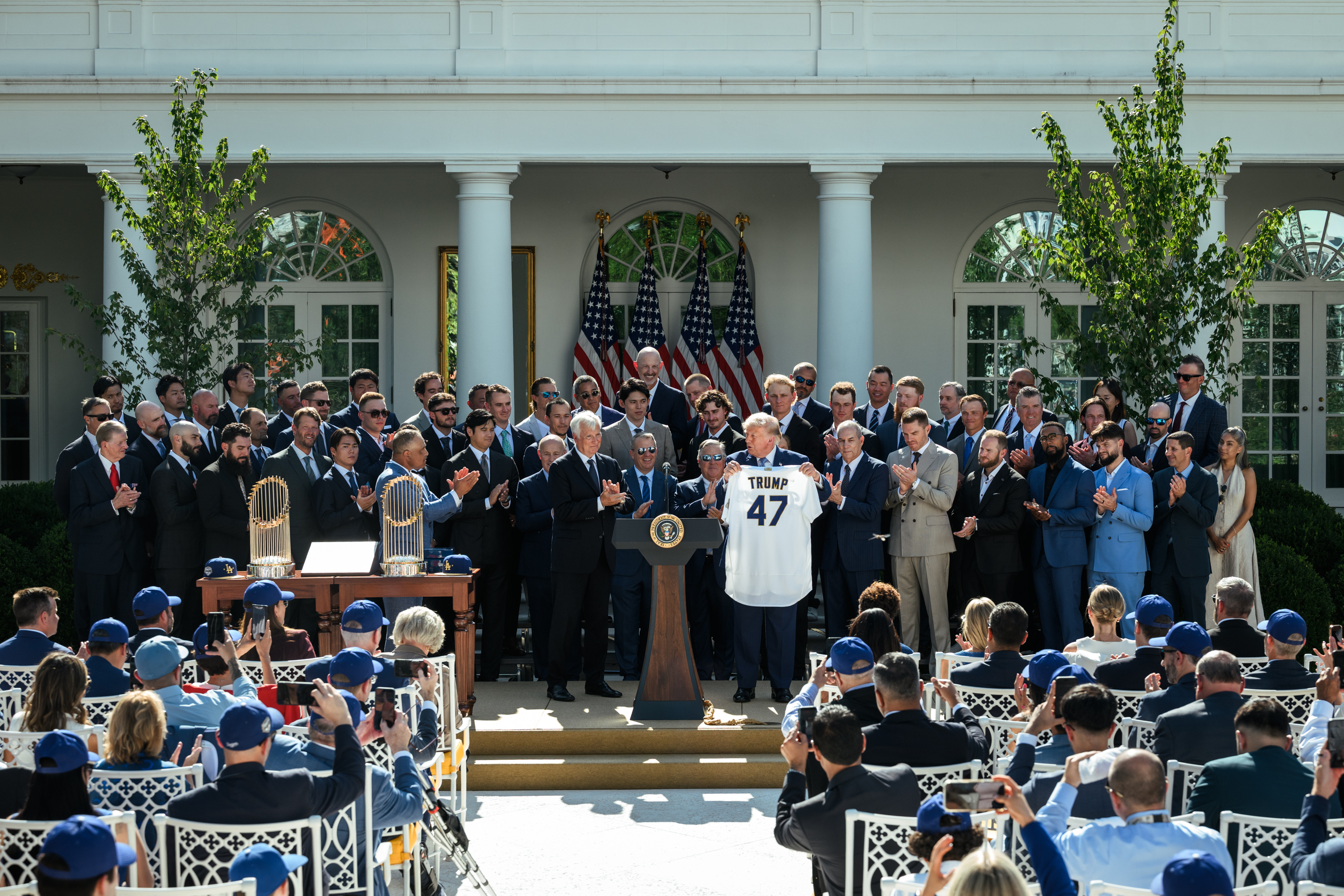
The Los Angeles Dodgers visiting the White House on July 23, 2026.

The Dodgers began July by being blown out by the Athletics, 7–1.

They returned home the next day for a four-game series with the San Diego Padres. The series started with the Padres scoring six runs in the first two innings to take a big lead, only for the Dodgers to come from behind and win, 12–7. Kyle Tucker had four hits in four at-bats and scored three runs, and Dalton Rushing also had four hits, including a home run and a double. A grand slam home run by Teoscar Hernández in the seventh gave the Dodgers a 4–3 win the next day. Yoshinobu Yamamoto pitched on the Fourth of July, striking out 10 while allowing only three hits in seven shutout innings homered in a 3–0 win. The Padres managed to prevent a sweep with a 5–2 win in the series finale. Manny Machado hit a three-run home run in the seventh. A series with the Colorado Rockies at Dodger Stadium was up next. In the first game, Rushing had three hits, including two doubles, and the walk-off game-winning hit in the 11th inning. This was the Dodgers' first game of the season to go into extra innings, making Los Angeles' 92-game streak of games without extra innings the second longest in MLB history, with the 2005 Boston Red Sox needing 99 games to finally play an extra inning contest. Shohei Ohtani led of the next game with his 300th career home run but the Rockies came from behind, scoring three runs in the eighth, to win 4–3. The Dodgers took the final game in the series, 4–3. The Dodgers next began a three-game series with the Arizona Diamondbacks with a bullpen game. Andy Pages had three hits and a home run but the Dodgers committed three errors and lost 9–3. The next day, the Diamondbacks scored five runs in the fifth inning enroute to a 9–2 win. The Dodgers lost again to the Diamondbacks, 5–3, on July 12 to head into the all-star break by being swept for the first time in the 2026 season.

The Dodgers had six players selected to the 2026 Major League Baseball All-Star Game, which was played on July 14 at Citizens Bank Park in Philadelphia. Ohtani was the top vote-getter in the league, while Freddie Freeman, Max Muncy and Pages were also voted as starters, and Yamamoto and Justin Wrobleski were voted in as reserves.

After the All-Star break, the Dodgers opened up the second half of the season at Yankee Stadium for a series with the New York Yankees. Roki Sasaki struck out five in 5 2/3 innings, and a two-run home run by Muncy in the seventh inning gave the Dodgers a 2–1 win. The Dodgers had to play a doubleheader on July 19 after a rainout the previous day. In the opener, Yamamoto pitched a complete game and the Dodgers scored five runs in the eighth to win 8–2. The Yankees won the last game of the series, 2–1, with an eighth inning Jazz Chisholm Jr. home run the deciding factor. Next up was a series with the Philadelphia Phillies at Citizens Bank Park. Mookie Betts hit two home runs in the opener, but the Dodgers lost 10–7. The next game was a pitching duel between Wrobleski and Zach Wheeler of the Phillies. Wrobleski allowed one run in 6 1/3 innings while Wheeler struck out nine in seven innings. The Dodgers won 2–1 on a two-run home run by Muncy in the fourth inning. The Dodgers won the next game, 9–5, as Muncy and Dalton Rushing homered. After an off-day, they began a series against the New York Mets at Citi Field. Sasaki struck out nine in seven innings while only allowing three hits and Kyle Tucker homered in a 4–2 win. The next day, Yamamoto allowed one run in six innings and Tucker homered again in a 4–3 win. The Mets came from behind in the next game, scoring seven runs between the sixth and seven innings to win 8–3.

The Dodgers returned home on July 28 to play the Seattle Mariners. Ohtani and Muncy homered in the opener but the Mariners came from behind to win, 7–6, thanks to two home runs by Dominic Canzone. The Dodgers took the next game, 4–2, as Eric Lauer allowed only one hit in six scoreless innings and Pages homered. Sasaki struck out seven in 5 1/3 innings and Rushing hit a three-run home run as the Dodgers took the series finale, 6–2. They ended the month by welcoming the Boston Red Sox to town. The Red Sox scored five runs off the Dodgers bullpen in the seventh inning to come from behind and win 9–4.

=== August ===
Yoshinobu Yamamoto began August by allowing three runs (two of them solo home runs by Ceddanne Rafaela) in eight innings as the Dodgers lost 3–2 to the Red Sox. The Red Sox also won the next day, 8–4, to finish off a sweep of the Dodgers for the first time since the 2010 season.

The Dodgers traveled to Wrigley Field to play the Chicago Cubs. The Dodgers lost 10–5. The Dodgers started Tarik Skubal on August 4, after acquiring him at the trade deadline from the Detroit Tigers. He allowed two runs in six innings while striking out six, but that was enough to cost the Dodgers the game as the offense remained punchless and the bullpen again faltered. The Dodgers lost their fifth straight game, for the first time all season, 5–1. The Cubs finished off the sweep of the Dodgers with a 7–6 win in the series finale, despite Shohei Ohtani hitting two home runs in the game. The Dodgers next traveled to Chase Field to play the Arizona Diamondbacks but started it off with their seventh straight loss, 4–3, on a two-run walk off home run by Ryan Waldschmidt off closer Edwin Díaz. Díaz blew another save the next day, but the Dodgers managed to win, 2–1, in 10 innings, to snap the losing streak. However, the Diamondbacks finished the series off with a 4–2 win.

The Dodgers returned home on August 10 to play the Kansas City Royals. The Dodgers came from behind to win 6–5. The Dodgers won again the next day, 5–4, on a walk-off hit by Max Muncy in the 10th inning. They finished off the sweep of the Royals with a 4–2 win. Ohtani and Mookie Betts each had two hits, including a home run and Eric Lauer struck out six in 6 1/3 innings. Next up were the Milwaukee Brewers. The Dodgers took a 4–2 lead after Muncy hit a three-run home run in the sixth inning, only for Díaz to blow another save and the Brewers won the game, 5–4. Yamamoto struck out nine while allowing only one run in six innings the following day while Andy Pages and Tommy Edman homered in a 3–1 win. Justin Wrobleski struck out six in six innings the next day, but allowed two two-run home runs as the Dodgers lost 4–1. The Brewers finished off the series with a 6–2 win.

The Dodgers went back on the road on August 17 for a quick three game road trip at Coors Field and Ohtani hit two home runs in a 11–5 win against the Colorado Rockies. Ohtani hit another home run, his 30th of the season, in the next game, a 7–6 win. The Dodgers swept the Rockies with a 6–4 10 inning victory.

They returned home to face the Pittsburgh Pirates. The Dodgers took an early lead when Muncy hit a two-run home run in the first and a two-run single by Betts in the third but the Pirates came back and tied the game with a two-run home run by Oneil Cruz in the eighth. The Dodgers won the game with a walk-off hit by Tommy Edman in the 10th. In the following game, Skubal struck out 11 batters in seven innings and the Dodgers won 4–3. The Dodgers finished off the series with a 4–0 shutout win. Blake Snell struck out six while only allowing two hits in six shutout innings.

Back on the road on August 25 against the Atlanta Braves at Truist Park, Tyler Glasnow returned from a lengthy injury absence and struck out seven in five innings. Ozzie Albies drove in the winning run in the eighth with an RBI single as the Braves won, 4–3. A walk-off hit by Ha-seong Kim gave the Braves a 6–5 win in the second game and the Braves completed the sweep, 1–0, thanks to Chris Sale striking out 11 in a complete game shut out. They moved on to Comerica Park for a series with the Tigers and Skubal greeted his former team by striking out seven and only allowing one run in six innings. An RBI single by Freddie Freeman in the eighth inning gave the Dodger a 2–1 win. The next day, Snell struck out 10 in five innings but the Tigers won 2–1 on a walk-off hit by Kevin McGonigle. The series wrapped up with a 6–1 Dodgers win. Glasnow struck out six while allowing only two hits in seven innings and Teoscar Hernández hit a two-run homerun.

=== September ===
The Dodgers began September with a home series against the St. Louis Cardinals and lost the opener 13–8. They allowed five home runs, including two by Thomas Saggese. In the next game, the Dodgers jumped out to an early lead only for the Cardinals to tie it up and then win the game 8–6, in 10 innings. Tommy Edman had four hits and Teoscar Hernández drove in two runs in the ninth in the Dodgers 3–2 walkoff win to prevent the sweep. The Dodgers welcomed the Washington Nationals to town for a three-game series starting on September 4. Blake Snell struck out seven in six shutout innings as the Dodgers won 5–3. Edman's three-run home run in the seventh inning put the Dodgers ahead in a game they won 6–5. The Dodgers finished the series off with a 7–5 win and a sweep of the Nationals. Mookie Betts' three-run home run in the eighth gave them the lead. In the next game, against the Cincinnati Reds on Labor Day, Emmet Sheehan struck out 10 while allowing only three hits and one run in 5 2/3 innings while Teoscar Hernández hit a three-run home run in a 6–3 win. In the following game, Tarik Skubal pitched 7 1/3 innings, struck out five and allowed four hits (one of which was a two-run home run by Elly De La Cruz). The Dodgers won 3–2. The Dodgers finished off a sweep of the Reds with a 14–1 victory. Yoshinobu Yamamoto struck out 10 while allowing only three hits in seven innings and the Dodgers hit four home runs.

The Dodgers began a road trip on September 11 against the Miami Marlins at loanDepot park. Snell struck out eight in 5 2/3 innings, Kyle Tucker hit a grand-slam home run in the seventh inning, and the Dodgers won 6–2. The Marlins took the next game, 4–3, to end the Dodgers eight-game winning streak. The series wrapped up with a 6–4 Marlins win. Josue De Paula hit a three-run home run in the fourth inning for his first major league hit as the Dodgers took a lead. However, the Marlins scored four runs in the ninth on a two-run double by Javier Sanoja followed by a home run by Agustín Ramírez for the walk-off win. On September 14, the Dodgers began a series at Great American Ball Park against the Reds. Skubal struck out nine in seven shutout innings. The Dodgers won 4–1 and clinched their 14th straight postseason appearance, tying the Atlanta Braves all-time record (1991-2005). The next day, Yamamoto allowed only one hit in seven scoreless innings while striking out seven. They won 4–0. On September 16, Snell left the game after the first because of a groin injury and the Reds scored six runs off the Dodgers bullpen to beat them 6–2. The next day, Tucker had three hits, including a home run, and drove in three runs as the Dodgers won 8–2 to clinch the NL Western Division title, their fifth straight and 13th in 14 years.

The Dodgers returned home on September 18 to play the San Francisco Giants. Tyler Glasnow struck out 10 batters in six innings, Mookie Betts had three hits, including two home runs, and the Dodgers won the opener 8–2. Betts had four more hits in the next game and Will Smith homered in a 10–4 win. The Dodgers took the next game, 4–1, as Sheehan struck out nine in 5 1/3 innings and Edman hit a home run. The San Diego Padres came to town for the final home stand of the regular season. The Dodgers scored four runs in the second and went on to win the opener, 7–0. A two-run home run by Manny Machado in the fourth inning gave the Padres a lead they never gave up, as they won the second game of the series, 5–1. Glasnow struck out 11 in 6 1/3 innings in the final home game of the regular season, but the Padres scored three runs in the seventh inning to win the game 4–2.

The Dodgers traveled to Oracle Park to wrap up the regular season with a three-game series against the Giants beginning on September 25. Skubal struck out 10 while only allowing three hits in seven scoreless innings while solo homers by Teoscar Hernández and Andy Pages gave the Dodgers their 2–0 win. The next day, a ninth inning Kiké Hernández home run gave the Dodgers a 4–3 win. The Dodgers won the regular season finale, 5–1, in 10 innings as Pages hit a three-run home run. It was the Dodgers 100th win of the season, the sixth time they had reached that mark under manager Dave Roberts.

== Postseason ==
=== Game log ===
2026 Postseason Game Log: 3–5 (Home: 1–3; Away: 2–2)
National League Division Series: 3–1 (Home: 1–1; Away: 2–0)

#	Date	Opponent	Score	Win	Loss	Save	Attendance	Record
1	October 3	Braves	W 5–3	Skubal (1–0)	Mederos (0–1)	Phillips (1)	50,194	1–0
2	October 4	Braves	L 2–3	Lee (2–0)	Bubic (0–1)	Iglesias (2)	50,729	1–1
3	October 6	@ Braves	W 3–1	Yamamoto (1–0)	Sale (0–1)	Díaz (1)	42,420	2–1
4	October 7	@ Braves	W 4–1	Henriquez (1–0)	Mahle (0–1)	Díaz (2)	41,173	3–1

National League Championship Series: 0–4 (Home: 0–2; Away: 0–2)

#	Date	Opponent	Score	Win	Loss	Save	Attendance	Record
1	October 11	@ Brewers	L 1–2	Hall (2–0)	Skubal (1–1)	Megill (3)	42,617	0–1
2	October 12	@ Brewers	L 4–7	Romero (1–1)	Stewart (0–1)	Ashby (1)	42,516	0–2
3	October 14	Brewers	L 2–6	Hall (3–0)	Snell (0–1)	Megill (4)	50,708	0–3
4	October 15	Brewers	L 4–6	Romero (2–1)	Scott (0–1)	Ashby (2)	49,104	0–4

=== Postseason rosters ===
Playoff rosters
National League Division Series

- Pitchers: 3 Edwin Díaz 7 Blake Snell 11 Roki Sasaki 18 Yoshinobu Yamamoto 29 Tarik Skubal 31 Tyler Glasnow 40 Kris Bubic 41 Brock Stewart 51 Alex Vesia 59 Evan Phillips 60 Edgardo Henriquez 66 Tanner Scott
- Two-way players: 17 Shohei Ohtani
- Catchers: 16 Will Smith 46 Hunter Feduccia
- Infielders: 5 Freddie Freeman 6 Hyeseong Kim 13 Max Muncy 50 Mookie Betts 72 Miguel Rojas
- Outfielders: 23 Kyle Tucker 37 Teoscar Hernández 44 Andy Pages 95 Josue De Paula
- Infielders/Outfielders: 8 Kiké Hernández 25 Tommy Edman

National League Championship Series

- Pitchers: 3 Edwin Díaz 7 Blake Snell 11 Roki Sasaki 18 Yoshinobu Yamamoto 29 Tarik Skubal 31 Tyler Glasnow 40 Kris Bubic 41 Brock Stewart 51 Alex Vesia 59 Evan Phillips 60 Edgardo Henriquez 66 Tanner Scott 70 Justin Wrobleski
- Two-way players: 17 Shohei Ohtani
- Catchers: 16 Will Smith 46 Hunter Feduccia
- Infielders: 5 Freddie Freeman 13 Max Muncy 50 Mookie Betts 72 Miguel Rojas
- Outfielders: 23 Kyle Tucker 37 Teoscar Hernández 44 Andy Pages 95 Josue De Paula
- Infielders/Outfielders: 8 Kiké Hernández 25 Tommy Edman

=== Division Series ===
The Dodgers hosted the Atlanta Braves in the Division Series, starting on October 3 at Dodger Stadium. In the opening game, Tarik Skubal allowed only one run (a solo home run by Sean Murphy on two hits in six innings while striking out seven. The Dodgers got two-run home runs from Teoscar Hernández and Kyle Tucker and a solo home run by Max Muncy and won the game 5–3. In the second game, Blake Snell was wild from the start, walking five and allowing only three his in 3 1/3 innings but only allowing one run. The Braves scored again on a triple by Michael Harris II in the fifth inning followed by a wild-pitch by reliever Kris Bubic. Harris drove in another run on a double in the seventh. Freddie Freeman and Muncy hit solo home runs but the Dodgers lost 3–2 to even the series.

The series moved to Truist Park for games 3 and 4. The third game was a pitching matchup between Yoshinobu Yamamoto and Chris Sale. Yamamoto allowed only one run on four hits while striking out 10 batters in seven innings while Sale struck out seven in five innings but allowed seven hits. The Dodgers scored three runs in the fourth inning on a two-run Kiké Hernández home run and a solo home run by Freeman. They held on for the 3–1 victory to take the lead in the series. In Game 4, Tyler Glasnow allowed only one run on one hit while striking out five in 4 2/3 innings. Both teams got first inning runs and then the Dodgers got two in the seventh when Andy Pages drove them in with a bases loaded hit. Muncy added another home run and the Dodgers finished off the series with a 4–1 win.

=== Championship Series ===
The Dodgers played in their third straight NLCS and second straight against the Milwaukee Brewers. The series began at American Family Field with a pitching matchup of Tarik Skubal vs Jacob Misiorowski. Andy Pages drove in a run in the second to give the Dodgers an early lead but Brice Turang hit a home run in the fourth to tie the game. Luis Lara drove in the go-ahead run the next inning to give the Brewers a 2–1 lead that held up the rest of the game. Yoshinobu Yamamoto started the second game for the Dodgers, but he turned in his shortest outing in his post-season history, allowing three runs on four hits and two walks while only striking out one batter in 2 2/3 innings. William Contreras had three hits, including a home run, and drove in three runs as the Brewers won the game 7–4.

The series moved to Dodger Stadium for Game 3. Blake Snell started for the Dodgers, he cruised through the first five innings with nine strikeouts but allowed back to back home runs in the sixith inning to Jake Bauers and Garrett Mitchell to give the Brewers a lead they never relinquished as they went on to win 6–2. In Game 4, Shohei Ohtani hit a three-run home run in the second inning to give the Dodgers an early 4–0 lead but it didn't last. The Brewers got a two-run double by Bauers in the fourth inning offTyler Glasnow and tied the game the following inning on a RBI single by David Hamilton and a bases load walk issued by Alex Vesia. A solo homer by Mitchell off Tanner Scott the next inning gave the Brewers the lead they would never surrender in a 6–4 win to finish off the sweep and end the Dodgers' quest for a three-peat.

== Roster ==
2026 Los Angeles Dodgers
Roster
Pitchers: 57 Charlie Barnes; 40 Kris Bubic; 78 Ben Casparius; 3 Edwin Díaz; 86 Jack Dreyer; 56 Jake Eder; 65 Paul Gervase; 31 Tyler Glasnow; 56 Seth Halvorsen; 60 Edgardo Henriquez; 26,29 Jonathan Hernández; 63 Kyle Hurt; 38 Cole Irvin; 61 Will Klein; 96 Landon Knack; 33 Eric Lauer; 62 Chayce McDermott; 28 Bobby Miller; 58 Wyatt Mills; 17 Shohei Ohtani; 59 Evan Phillips; 11 Roki Sasaki; 66 Tanner Scott; 80 Emmet Sheehan; 29 Tarik Skubal; 7 Blake Snell; 41 Brock Stewart; 49 Blake Treinen; 51 Alex Vesia; 70 Justin Wrobleski; 18 Yoshinobu Yamamoto	Catchers: 64 Eliézer Alfonzo Jr.; 46 Hunter Feduccia; 52 Chuckie Robinson; 47 Ben Rortvedt; 68 Dalton Rushing; 16 Will Smith; Infielders: 50 Mookie Betts; 25 Tommy Edman; 21 Santiago Espinal; 76 Alex Freeland; 5 Freddie Freeman; 8 Kiké Hernández; 6 Hyeseong Kim; 13 Max Muncy; 72 Miguel Rojas	Outfielders: 12 Alex Call; 95 Josue De Paula; 37 Teoscar Hernández; 44 Andy Pages; 9 Alek Thomas; 23 Kyle Tucker; 67 Ryan Ward	Manager: 30 Dave Roberts; Coaches: 54 Josh Bard (bullpen); 98 Aaron Bates (hitting); 91 Dino Ebel (third base); 88 Bob Geren (field coordinator); 0 Danny Lehmann (bench); 87 Connor McGuiness (assistant pitching); 99 Mark Prior (pitching); 72 Robert Van Scoyoc (hitting); 84 Chris Woodward (first base)

== Statistics ==
=== Batting ===
Stats in bold are the team leaders.

Note: G = Games played; AB = At bats; R = Runs; H = Hits; 2B = Doubles; 3B = Triples; HR = Home runs; RBI = Runs batted in; BB = Walks; SO = Strikeouts; SB = Stolen bases; AVG = Batting average; OBP = On-base percentage; SLG = Slugging percentage; OPS = On base + slugging

Player	G	AB	R	H	2B	3B	HR	RBI	BB	SO	SB	AVG	OBP	SLG	OPS
Freddie Freeman	153	**579**	74	**167**	**32**	1	16	70	66	116	7	**.288**	.362	.430	.792
Kyle Tucker	**154**	540	**90**	126	23	**4**	17	70	78	105	12	.233	.330	.385	.715
Shohei Ohtani	139	523	89	144	26	**4**	**30**	81	**81**	**152**	11	.275	**.377**	**.512**	**.889**
Andy Pages	134	511	75	140	26	2	23	**85**	49	113	**13**	.274	.343	.468	.811
Max Muncy	149	488	81	123	27	1	29	76	65	140	3	.252	.348	.490	.838
Mookie Betts	123	478	71	123	25	0	23	69	47	58	2	.257	.326	.454	.780
Teoscar Hernández	125	442	66	118	18	2	16	64	42	135	5	.267	.334	.425	.759
Tommy Edman	84	291	44	72	12	2	8	42	22	67	7	.247	.329	.385	.714
Will Smith	73	235	35	61	9	0	10	34	34	45	0	.260	.355	.426	.781
Alex Freeland	89	231	32	54	9	0	4	21	32	74	4	.234	.327	.325	.652
Miguel Rojas	107	225	23	60	16	0	4	23	16	27	1	.267	.312	.391	.703
Dalton Rushing	80	224	37	55	12	0	12	36	23	74	0	.246	.328	.460	.788
Alex Call	88	163	25	38	9	0	1	20	23	35	1	.233	.349	.307	.656
Hyeseong Kim	43	116	16	30	3	1	1	11	12	31	5	.259	.323	.328	.651
Kiké Hernández	41	90	12	20	4	0	4	12	6	28	0	.222	.271	.400	.671
Hunter Feduccia	33	76	6	15	2	0	1	7	14	16	0	.197	.322	.263	.585
Santiago Espinal	36	56	5	15	3	0	1	7	1	8	0	.268	.276	.375	.651
Ryan Ward	20	55	8	12	4	0	3	12	5	17	0	.218	.283	.455	.738
Josue De Paula	11	31	7	10	3	1	1	7	11	5	1	.323	.500	.581	1.081
Eliézer Alfonzo Jr.	13	28	3	5	2	0	0	4	0	3	0	.179	.179	.250	.429
Ben Rortvedt	16	27	0	5	0	0	0	1	0	9	0	.185	.185	.185	.370
Chuckie Robinson	8	23	1	2	0	0	0	1	0	5	0	.087	.087	.087	.174
Alek Thomas	7	19	1	4	1	0	0	3	1	4	0	.211	.250	.263	.513
**Totals**	**162**	**5451**	**801**	**1399**	**266**	**18**	**204**	**756**	**628**	**1267**	**72**	**.257**	**.338**	**.424**	**.762**

Source:Baseball Reference

=== Pitching ===
List does not include position players. Stats in bold are the team leaders.

Note: W = Wins; L = Losses; ERA = Earned run average; G = Games pitched; GS = Games started; SV = Saves; IP = Innings pitched; H = Hits allowed; R = Runs allowed; ER = Earned runs allowed; BB = Walks allowed; K = Strikeouts

Player	W	L	ERA	G	GS	SV	IP	H	R	ER	BB	K
Yoshinobu Yamamoto	**14**	**9**	**2.53**	28	**28**	0	**185.0**	119	55	52	42	**182**
Justin Wrobleski	12	5	3.66	28	22	0	140.0	**129**	59	57	31	118
Roki Sasaki	5	5	4.49	26	23	0	122.1	113	**63**	**61**	**48**	123
Emmet Sheehan	5	8	4.57	23	22	0	112.1	99	58	57	33	132
Shohei Ohtani	8	2	1.79	14	14	0	85.2	55	21	17	26	95
Tyler Glasnow	5	2	3.53	13	13	0	74.0	45	29	29	25	98
Eric Lauer	7	2	4.50	14	12	0	72.0	69	37	36	19	46
Jack Dreyer	5	2	3.20	67	3	2	64.2	48	23	23	23	73
Tanner Scott	1	6	2.69	69	0	**25**	63.2	48	20	19	15	82
Tarik Skubal	5	2	2.61	10	10	0	62.0	52	19	18	13	70
Edgardo Henriquez	4	1	2.85	61	1	2	60.0	37	25	19	25	71
Alex Vesia	3	1	2.64	**72**	0	3	58.0	30	18	17	32	74
Kyle Hurt	4	1	4.14	44	1	1	45.2	38	23	21	23	58
Blake Snell	4	1	1.90	9	9	0	42.2	31	10	9	16	55
Will Klein	3	4	3.67	36	3	2	41.2	44	22	17	21	49
Blake Treinen	4	1	3.64	36	0	1	29.2	29	12	12	13	31
Brock Stewart	1	2	2.70	28	1	1	26.2	17	10	8	10	25
Evan Phillips	3	2	3.46	31	0	1	26.0	22	11	10	6	33
Jonathan Hernández	0	0	5.68	16	0	0	25.1	21	16	16	13	22
Edwin Díaz	2	2	8.68	21	0	7	18.2	26	18	18	11	28
Landon Knack	1	0	3.86	4	0	1	11.2	12	5	5	2	8
Seth Halvorsen	1	1	8.10	11	0	0	10.0	11	9	9	2	6
Charlie Barnes	0	1	6.30	4	0	0	10.0	13	7	7	4	5
Paul Gervase	0	0	2.35	4	0	0	7.2	7	2	2	5	8
Bobby Miller	1	0	3.68	3	0	0	7.1	5	3	3	4	8
Wyatt Mills	0	0	5.68	6	0	0	6.1	5	5	4	9	5
Cole Irvin	0	1	9.00	1	0	0	6.0	8	6	6	3	5
Ben Casparius	0	1	9.64	5	0	0	4.2	6	5	5	4	4
Kris Bubic	1	0	0.00	5	0	0	4.2	4	0	0	0	5
Jake Eder	1	0	2.25	4	0	0	4.0	3	1	1	1	1
Chayce McDermott	0	0	7.71	2	0	0	2.1	3	2	2	0	1
**Totals**	**100**	**62**	**3.55**	**162**	**162**	**46**	**1435.2**	**1159**	**600**	**566**	**480**	**1521**

Source:Baseball Reference

== Awards and honors ==
Recipient	Award	Date awarded	Ref.
Andy Pages	National League Player of the Week Award (March 30–April 5)	April 6, 2026	
Shohei Ohtani	National League Pitcher of the Month Award (April)	May 4, 2026	
Shohei Ohtani	2026 Major League Baseball All-Star Game (Starter)	June 25, 2026	
Freddie Freeman	2026 Major League Baseball All-Star Game (Starter)	July 4, 2026	
Max Muncy	2026 Major League Baseball All-Star Game (Starter)	July 4, 2026	
Andy Pages	2026 Major League Baseball All-Star Game (Starter)	July 4, 2026	
Yoshinobu Yamamoto	2026 Major League Baseball All-Star Game	July 4, 2026	
Justin Wrobleski	2026 Major League Baseball All-Star Game	July 11, 2026	
Miguel Rojas	Roy Campanella Award	September 22, 2026	
Tarik Skubal	All-MLB Team (second team)	November 11, 2026	
Yoshinobu Yamamoto	All-MLB Team (second team)	November 11, 2026	

== Transactions ==
=== March ===
- On March 25, signed RHP Jake Cousins, placed RHP Bobby Miller (right shoulder soreness) on the 60-day injured list, placed IF Tommy Edman (ankle surgery) on the 10-day injured list and RHPs Cousins (shoulder surgery), Brock Stewart (shoulder surgery), Gavin Stone (shoulder inflammation), Brusdar Graterol (right shoulder surgery), Landon Knack (intercostal strain), and LHP Blake Snell (left shoulder fatigue) on the 15-day injured list.

=== April ===
- On April 1, acquired LHP Jake Eder from the Washington Nationals for cash considerations and transferred RHP Jake Cousins to the 60-day injured list. Claimed RHP Grant Holman off waivers from the Arizona Diamondbacks and transferred RHP Gavin Stone to the 60-day injured list.
- On April 5, placed IF Mookie Betts on the 10-day injured list with a right oblique strain and recalled IF Hyeseong Kim from AAA Oklahoma City.
- On April 11, RHP Grant Holman was claimed off waivers by the Detroit Tigers.
- On April 13, placed RHP Ben Casparius on the 15-day injured list with right shoulder inflammation and recalled RHP Kyle Hurt from AAA Oklahoma City.
- On April 17, acquired RHP Chayce McDermott from the Baltimore Orioles in exchange for minor league pitcher Axel Pérez, and optioned him to AAA Oklahoma City.
- On April 19, placed 1B Freddie Freeman on the paternity list and recalled 1B/OF Ryan Ward from AAA Oklahoma City.
- On April 20, placed RHP Edwin Díaz on the 15-day injured list with right elbow loose bodies and recalled LHP Jake Eder from AAA Oklahoma City.
- On April 21, activated 1B Freddie Freeman from the paternity list and optioned 1B/OF Ryan Ward to AAA Oklahoma City.
- On April 28, acquired IF/OF Tyler Fitzgerald from the Toronto Blue Jays in exchange for cash considerations and transferred RHP Landon Knack from the 15-day injured list to the 60-day injured list.

=== May ===
- On May 6, activated RHP Brock Stewart from the 15-day injured list and optioned LHP Jake Eder to AAA Oklahoma City.
- On May 8, placed RHP Tyler Glasnow on the 15-day injured list with back spasms and recalled RHP Paul Gervase from AAA Oklahoma City.
- On May 9, claimed LHP Charlie Barnes off waivers from the Chicago Cubs and transferred IF/OF Tommy Edman from the 10-day injured list to the 60-day injured list. Activated LHP Blake Snell from the 15-day injured list and placed RHP Brock Stewart on the 15-day injured list with a bone spur on his left foot.
- On May 10, optioned RHP Paul Gervase to AAA Oklahoma City, purchased the contract of RHP Wyatt Mills from AAA Oklahoma City and transferred RHP Edwin Díaz from the 15-day injured list to the 60-day injured list.
- On May 11, activated SS Mookie Betts from the 10-day injured list and optioned IF Alex Freeland to AAA Oklahoma City.
- On May 12, acquired OF Alek Thomas from the Arizona Diamondbacks in exchange for minor league OF Jose Requena and designated OF Michael Siani for assignment.
- On May 15, placed LHP Blake Snell on the 15-day injured list with loose bodies in his left elow and recalled LHP Charlie Barnes from AAA Oklahoma City.
- On May 17, placed LHP Jack Dreyer on the 15-day injured list with left shoulder discomfort, optioned LHP Charlie Barnes to AAA Oklahoma City, recalled RHPs Paul Gervase and Chayce McDermott from AAA Oklahoma City. Acquired LHP Eric Lauer from the Toronto Blue Jays in exchange for cash considerations and a player to be named later and transferred RHP Brusdar Graterol from the 15-day injured list to the 60-day injured list.
- On May 18, signed RHP Jonathan Hernández to a major league contract, optioned RHP Chayce McDermott to AAA Oklahoma City and transferred RHP Ben Casparius from the 15-day injured list to the 60-day injured list.
- On May 19, activated LHP Eric Lauer and optioned RHP Wyatt Mills to AAA Oklahoma City.
- On May 25, activated IF/OF Kiké Hernández from the 60-day injured list and designated IF Santiago Espinal for assignment.
- On May 27, placed IF/OF Kiké Hernández on the 10-day injured list with a left groin strain and recalled IF Alex Freeland from AAA Oklahoma City.
- On May 29, placed OF Teoscar Hernández on the 10-day injured list with a left hamstring strain, optioned IF Hyeseong Kim to AAA Oklahoma City, recalled 1B/OF Ryan Ward from AAA Oklahoma City, purchased the contract of IF Santiago Espinal from AAA Oklahoma City and transferred LHP Blake Snell from the 15-day injured list to the 60-day injured list.
- On May 31, activated LHP Jack Dreyer from the 15-day injured list and optioned RHP Paul Gervase to AAA Oklahoma City.

=== June ===
- On June 6, purchased the contract of RHP Nick Frasso from AAA Oklahoma City, optioned him back to Oklahoma City, and transferred RHP Tyler Glasnow from the 15-day injured list to the 60-day injured list.
- On June 10, released IF/OF Tyler Fitzgerald.
- On June 11, placed C Will Smith on the 10-day injured list with neck inflammation and purchased the contract of C Chuckie Robinson from AAA Oklahoma City.
- On June 16, activated IF/OF Tommy Edman from the 60-day injured list and designated IF Santiago Espinal for assignment.
- On June 20, placed RHP Blake Treinen on the 15-day injured list with right elbow inflammation and recalled RHP Chayce McDermott from AAA Oklahoma City.
- On June 22, activated RHP Brock Stewart from the 15-day injured list and optioned RHP Chayce McDermott to AAA Oklahoma City.
- On June 29, activated OF Teoscar Hernández from the 10-day injured list and optioned 1B/OF Ryan Ward to AAA Oklahoma City.
- On June 30, recalled RHP Wyatt Mills from AAA Oklahoma City and designated RHP Jonathan Hernández for assignment.

=== July ===
- On July 1, optioned RHP Wyatt Mills to AAA Oklahoma City and recalled LHP Charlie Barnes from AAA Oklahoma City.
- On July 2, recalled RHP Paul Gervase from AAA Oklahoma City and optioned LHP Charlie Barnes to AAA Oklahoma City.
- On July 4, optioned C Chuckie Robinson to AAA Oklahoma City and purchased the contract of C Eliézer Alfonzo Jr. from AAA Oklahoma City.
- On July 6, activated RHP Evan Phillips from the 60-day injured list, optioned RHP Paul Gervase to AAA Oklahoma City, purchased the contract of RHP Carlos Durán from AAA Oklahoma City and optioned him back to Oklahoma City, designated C Chuckie Robinson for assignment and released RHP Jake Eder.
- On July 11, activated RHP Landon Knack from the 60-day injured list, optioned RHP Kyle Hurt to AAA Oklahoma City and designated LHP Charlie Barnes for assignment.
- On July 19, recalled RHP Kyle Hurt from AAA Oklahoma City.
- On July 20, optioned RHP Kyle Hurt to AAA Oklahoma City, acquired RHP Seth Halvorsen from the Colorado Rockies in exchange for Nick Frasso and Landyn Vidourek.
- On July 21, purchased the contract of LHP Charlie Barnes from AAA Oklahoma City, optioned RHP Landon Knack to AAA Oklahoma City, and transferred C Will Smith to the 60-day injured list.
- On July 28, activated IF/OF Kiké Hernández from the 10-day injured list and optioned IF Alex Freeland to AAA Oklahoma City.
- On July 29, activated RHP Edwin Díaz from the 60-day injured list and designated LHP Charlie Barnes for assignment.
- On July 31, placed RHP Brock Stewart on the 15-day injured list with right shoulder discomfort, purchased the contract of LHP Cole Irvin from AAA Oklahoma City and designated RHP Chayce McDermott for assignment.

=== August ===
- On August 1, placed RHP Will Klein on the 15-day injured list with right elbow discomfort, designated LHP Cole Irvin for assignment and recalled RHPs Kyle Hurt and Wyatt Mills from AAA Oklahoma City.
- On August 2, acquired LHP Tarik Skubal from the Detroit Tigers in exchange for RHP River Ryan and minor leaguers RHP Brady Smith and OF Zyhir Hope.
- On August 3, acquired LHP Kris Bubic from the Kansas City Royals in exchange for RHP Carlos Durán; acquired C Hunter Feduccia and minor league RHP Jacob Kmatz from the Tampa Bay Rays in exchange for minor league OF Jack Suwinski and international bonus pool money; placed C Dalton Rushing on the 10-day injured list with right elbow strain, optioned RHP Emmet Sheehan to AAA Oklahoma City, purchased the contracts of C Chuckie Robinson and RHP Jonathan Hernández from AAA Oklahoma City, activated LHP Tarik Skubal and designated RHP Wyatt Mills for assignment.
- On August 4, activated C Hunter Feduccia, optioned C Eliézer Alfonzo Jr. to AAA Oklahoma City, purchased the contract of C Ben Rortvedt from AAA Oklahoma City and designated C Chuckie Robinson for assignment.
- On August 10, optioned RHP Kyle Hurt to AAA Oklahoma City, recalled RHP Seth Halvorsen from AAA Oklahoma City, purchased the contract of LHP Charlie Barnes from AAA Oklahoma City and designated RHP Jonathan Hernández for assignment.
- On August 11, activated LHP Blake Snell from the 60-day injured list, optioned LHP Charlie Barnes to AAA Oklahoma City and transferred RHP Blake Treinen from the 15-day injured list to the 60-day injured list.
- On August 12, optioned RHP Seth Halvorsen to AAA Oklahoma City and recalled RHP Landon Knack from AAA Oklahoma City.
- On August 13, optioned RHP Landon Knack to AAA Oklahoma City, purchased the contract of RHP Jonathan Hernández from AAA Oklahoma City and designated LHP Charlie Barnes for assignment.
- On August 16, placed LHP Justin Wrobleski on the 15-day injured list with left forearm inflammation and recalled RHP Kyle Hurt from AAA Oklahoma City.
- On August 18, placed RHP Edwin Díaz on the 15-day injured list with neck inflammation and recalled RHP Emmet Sheehan from AAA Oklahoma City.
- On August 19, activated RHP Brock Stewart from the 15-day injured list and designated RHP Jonathan Hernández for assignment.
- On August 21, recalled RHP Paul Gervase from AAA Oklahoma City and optioned RHP Emmet Sheehan to AAA Oklahoma City.
- On August 22, placed OF Andy Pages on the 10-day injured list with a fractured left hand and recalled OF Alek Thomas from AAA Oklahoma City.
- On August 25, activated RHP Tyler Glasnow from the 60-day injured list and optioned RHP Paul Gervase to AAA Oklahoma City.
- On August 27, placed RHP Roki Sasaki on the 15-day injured list with a blister on his right middle finger and recalled RHP Seth Halvorsen from AAA Oklahoma City.

=== September ===
- On September 1, activated LHP Justin Wrobleski from the 15-day injured list, C Dalton Rushing from the 10-day injured list and C Will Smith from the 60-day injured list, recalled IF Alex Freeland from AAA Oklahoma City, optioned OF Alek Thomas to AAA Oklahoma City and designated C Ben Rortvedt for assignment.
- On September 2, activated RHP Blake Treinen from the 60-day injured list, placed LHP Eric Lauer on the 15-day injured list with left elbow inflammation, and transferred RHP Will Klein from the 15-day injured list to the 60-day injured list.
- On September 5, activated RHP Bobby Miller from the 60-day injured list, optioned RHP Kyle Hurt to AAA Oklahoma City and designated OF Alek Thomas for assignment.
- On September 6, placed C Dalton Rushing on the 15-day injured list with right elbow soreness and recalled C Eliézer Alfonzo Jr. from AAA Oklahoma City.
- On September 8, optioned RHP Bobby Miller to AAA Oklahoma City and recalled RHP Emmet Sheehan from AAA Oklahoma City.
- On September 11, placed RHP/DH Shohei Ohtani on the 15-day injured list with right biceps inflammation, purchased the contract of OF Josue De Paula from AA Tulsa and transferred LHP Eric Lauer from the 15-day injured list to the 60-day injured list.
- On September 14, optioned RHP Emmet Sheehan to AAA Oklahoma City and recalled RHP Paul Gervase from AAA Oklahoma City. Placed RHP Edgardo Henriquez on the 15-day injured list with lower back discomfort and recalled RHP Bobby Miller from AAA Oklahoma City.
- On September 16, activated LHP Kris Bubic from the 60-day injured list, optioned RHP Paul Gervase to AAA Oklahoma City and designated 1B/OF Ryan Ward for assignment.
- On September 17, optioned RHP Bobby Miller to AAA Oklahoma City and recalled RHP Landon Knack from AAA Oklahoma City.
- On September 18, activated RHP Edwin Díaz from the 15-day injured list and optioned RHP Landon Knack to AAA Oklahoma City.
- On September 20, placed LHP Tarik Skubal on bereavement leave, optioned RHP Seth Halvorsen to AAA Oklahoma City and recalled RHPs Emmet Sheehan and Kyle Hurt from AAA Oklahoma City.
- On September 22, activated RHP Roki Sasaki from the 15-day injured list and OF Andy Pages from the 10-day injured list and optioned RHP Emmet Sheehan and C Eliézer Alfonzo Jr. to AAA Oklahoma City.
- On September 23, activated RHP/DH Shohei Ohtani from the 15-day injured list and LHP Tarik Skubal from the bereavement list and optioned OF Josue De Paula and RHP Kyle Hurt to AAA Oklahoma City.
- On September 25, activated C Dalton Rushing from the 10-day injured list and optioned IF Alex Freeland to AAA Oklahoma City.
- On September 27, placed RHP Blake Treinen on the 15-day injured list with right shoulder inflammation and recalled RHP Bobby Miller from AAA Oklahoma City.

== Farm system ==
On December 12, 2024, the Dodgers single–A affiliate, the Rancho Cucamonga Quakes were sold to Diamond Baseball Holdings and it was announced that the Dodgers would have a new California League affiliate beginning in 2026. On September 18, 2025, the new team was officially unveiled as the Ontario Tower Buzzers, taking the name from a line from the film Top Gun.

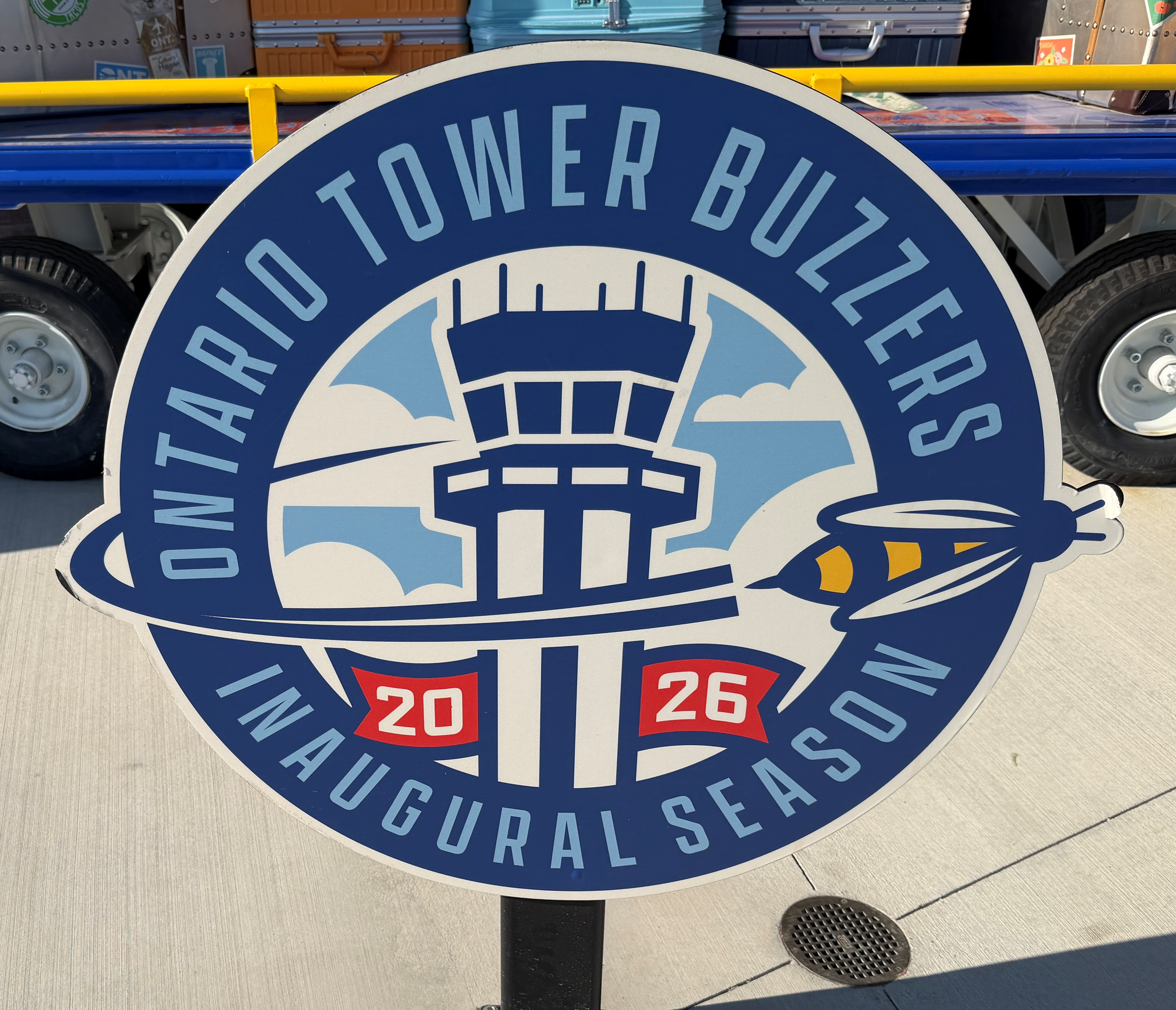
Ontario Tower Buzzers inaugural season

Level	Team	League	Manager	W	L	Position
AAA	Oklahoma City Comets	Pacific Coast League (East Division)	Scott Hennessy	89	60	1st place PCL Champions; AAA Champions
AA	Tulsa Drillers	Texas League (North Division)	Eric Wedge	88	50	1st place Lost in playoffs
High A	Great Lakes Loons	Midwest League (East Division)	Jair Fernandez	75	54	1st place Lost in playoffs
Low A	Ontario Tower Buzzers	California League (South Division)	John Shoemaker	71	61	1st place Lost in playoffs
Rookie	ACL Dodgers	Arizona Complex League (West Division)	Fumi Ishibashi	25	35	5th place
Foreign Rookie	DSL Dodgers Bautista	Dominican Summer League (Northwest Division)	Leury Bonilla	24	30	4th place
Foreign Rookie	DSL Dodgers Mega	Dominican Summer League (Northwest Division)	Sergio Mendez	22	31	5th place

=== Minor League awards and honors ===
Branch Rickey Awards:

Dodgers Minor League Player of the Year: Josue De Paula
Dodgers Minor League Pitcher of the Year: Christian Zazueta

All-Star Futures Game

Outfielder Josue De Paula
Outfielder Mike Sirota

Pacific Coast League All-Stars

Pitcher Seth Halvorsen
Pitcher Christian Romero
Outfielder James Tibbs III
Manager Scott Hennessey (Manager of the Year)

Texas League All-Stars

Pitcher Nick Robertson
Outfielder Josue De Paula (also League MVP)
Outfielder Zyhir Hope
Outfielder Mike Sirota
Designated hitter Jake Gelof
Manager Eric Wedge (Manager of the Year)

Midwest League All-Stars

Pitcher Zach Root
Infielder Emil Morales
Outfielder Charles Davalan (also League MVP)
Outfielder Eduardo Quintero
Manager Jair Fernandez (Manager of the Year)

California League All-Stars

First baseman Easton Shelton (also League MVP)
Second baseman Kellon Lindsey
Outfielder Jaron Elkins
Utility player Mairo Martinus

Arizona Complex League All-Stars

Infielder Daniel Mielcarek

== Major League Baseball draft ==
The 2026 Draft was held July 11–12, 2026. The Dodgers lost their second-, third-, fifth- and sixth-highest picks as a penalty for signing two players who had rejected qualifying offers. Their first pick was also dropped down 10 spots because they exceeded the second surcharge threshold of the Competitive Balance Tax. The picked 16 players in the draft.

2026 draft picks

Round	Name	Position	School	Signed	Career span	Highest level
1	Bo Lowrance	3B	Christ Church Episcopal School	Yes		
4	Russell Sandefer	RHP	University of Florida	Yes		
7	Charlie West	LHP	University of Connecticut	Yes	2026–present	A
8	Miles Gosztola	LHP	University of Oregon	Yes		
9	Kyeler Thompson	OF	Texas Tech University	Yes	2026–present	A
10	Devin Bell	RHP	University of Oregon	Yes	2026–present	A
11	Cody New	LHP	California Baptist University	Yes		
12	Gavin Van Kempen	RHP	East Carolina University	Yes		
13	Caleb Johnson	SS	Jacksonville State University	Yes	2026–present	A
14	Ryne Rodriguez	LHP	University of Houston	Yes		
15	Aemed Nasser	OF	Central Pointe Christian Academy	Yes		
16	Ethan Sutton	RHP	University of South Florida	Yes		
17	Camden Wimbish	RHP	Campbell University	Yes	2026–present	A
18	Max Irving	SS	Montverde Academy	No		
19	Luke Bard	C	Houston Christian University	Yes		
20	Zach Bates	LHP	University of Illinois	yes		
Ref.:
