= Josue De Paula =

Dominican-American baseball player (born 2005)

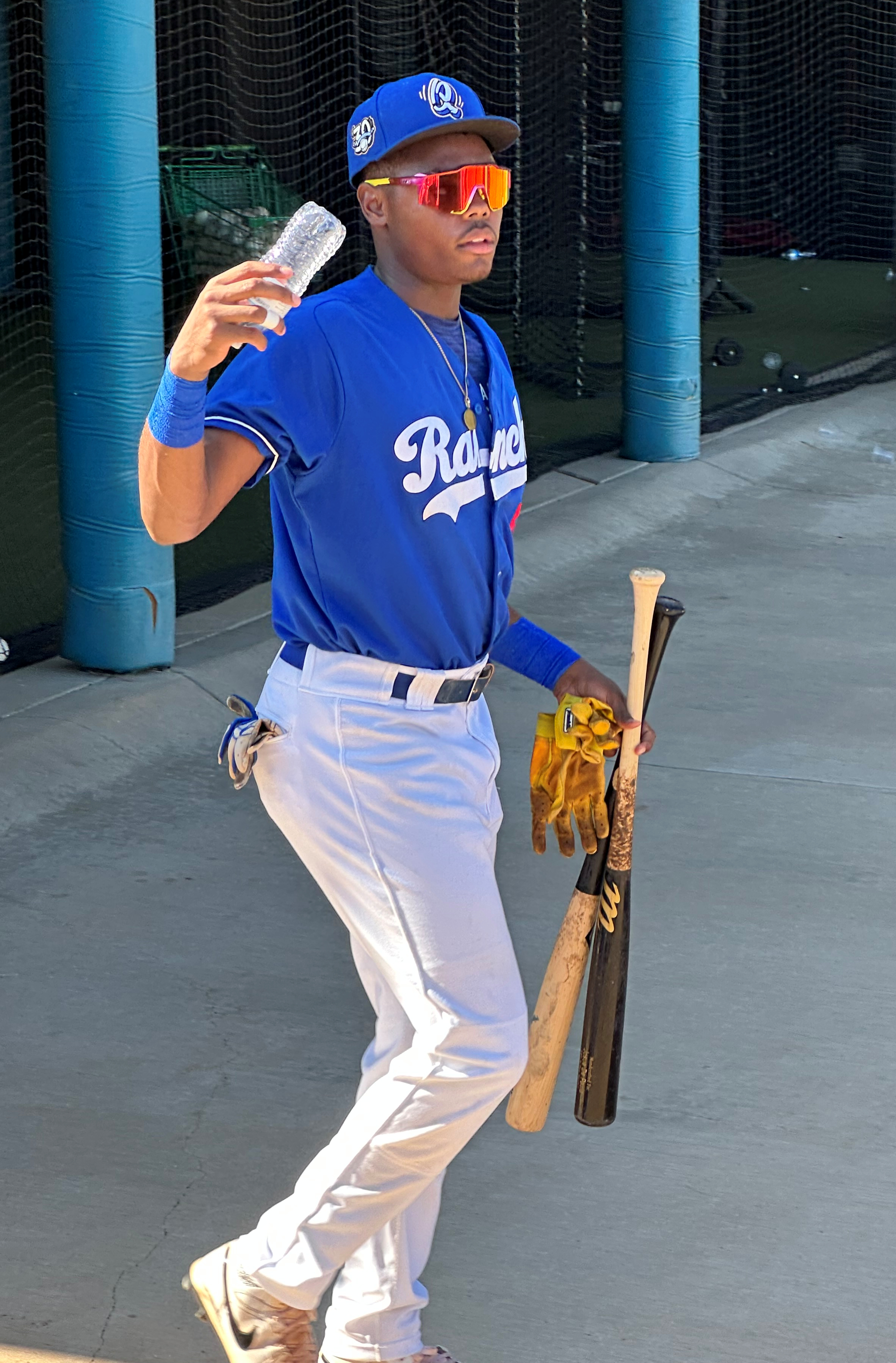
- DePaula with the Rancho Cucamonga Quakes

Los Angeles Dodgers – No. 95
- Outfielder
- Born: May 24, 2005 (age 21); Brooklyn, New York, U.S.
- Bats: Left Throws: Left

MLB debut
- September 11, 2026, for the Los Angeles Dodgers

MLB statistics (through 2026 season)
- Batting average: .323
- Home runs: 1
- Runs batted in: 7
- Stats at Baseball Reference

Teams
- Los Angeles Dodgers (2026–present)

Josue De Paula (born May 24, 2005) is a Dominican-American professional baseball outfielder for the Los Angeles Dodgers of Major League Baseball (MLB). He made his MLB debut in 2026.

== Early life ==
De Paula was born and raised in Coney Island, Brooklyn, New York, where he lived until he was 15 years old. He briefly attended Benjamin N. Cardozo High School, but only played in a single high school baseball game before the school shifted to virtual learning because of the COVID-19 pandemic lockdowns.

Looking for an opportunity to play baseball year-round while New York City sports were shut down, his family relocated to the Dominican Republic in 2020, where he lived with his paternal uncles in Santo Domingo and enrolled in the El Niche Baseball Academy there.

Because his father is a native-born Dominican citizen, Josue was legally eligible to become a Dominican citizen by descent under Dominican law. Having Dominican citizenship was very beneficial to him, because it allowed him to sign with the Los Angeles Dodgers as an international free agent in 2022, without needing international student or athletic visas to stay in the Dominican Republic.

== Career ==
De Paula signed a $397,500 contract with the Los Angeles Dodgers on January 15, 2022, while playing out of El Niche Academy in the Dominican Republic.

De Paula began his professional career with the Dominican Summer League Dodgers in 2022, hitting .349 in 54 games with five homers and 30 RBI and earning a spot on the post-season all-star team. He was promoted to the Single-A Rancho Cucamonga Quakes right after his 18th birthday in May 2023. He played in 74 games for the Quakes, hitting .284 with two homers and 40 RBI.

De Paula was selected to participate in the inaugural "Spring Breakout" minor league showcase during spring training 2024. On June 25, 2024, he was promoted to the High-A Great Lakes Loons. Between the Quakes and Loons, he played in 107 games, with a .268 batting average, 10 homers, 62 RBI and 27 stolen bases. Starting the season as the 12th overall prospect in the Dodgers' system by MLB.com, he jumped 10 spots to become the 2nd overall prospect in the Dodgers' system by the end of the season.

De Paula returned to Great Lakes to start the 2025 season, and playing for two minor league teams in the season batted .250 in 360 at bats. He was selected to represent the Dodgers organization at the 2025 All-Star Futures Game, where he hit a three-run home run and won the game's MVP Award. In 98 games for the Loons, De Paula batted .263 with 12 home runs and 44 RBI and earned Midwest League All-Star honors. He was promoted to the Double-A Tulsa Drillers for the last couple weeks of the season, but was hitless in 18 at-bats, with five strikeouts, in the four games he played. He was expected to play for the Glendale Desert Dogs in the Arizona Fall League, but did not play a single game due to a hamstring injury. He ended the season as the first overall prospect for the Dodgers and 12th overall in all of Major League Baseball (MLB). He returned to Tulsa for 2026 where he batted .303 with 27 home runs and 104 RBI in 124 games. After the season he was named as the MVP of the Texas League.

De Paula was called up to the Dodgers on September 11, 2026, and made his MLB debut as the designated hitter against the Miami Marlins. On September 13, he hit a three-run home run off Marlins pitcher Eury Pérez for his first Major League hit. In 11 games for the Dodgers he batted .323 (10 hits in 31 at-bats) with the one home run, seven RBI and walked 11 times with only five strikeouts.

== Personal life ==
On his mother's side, De Paula is a second cousin of former National Basketball Association point guards Stephon Marbury and Sebastian Telfair.

== See also ==
- List of Dominican Americans
- All-Star Futures Game all-time roster
