= Eliézer Alfonzo Jr. =

Venezuelan baseball player (born 1999)

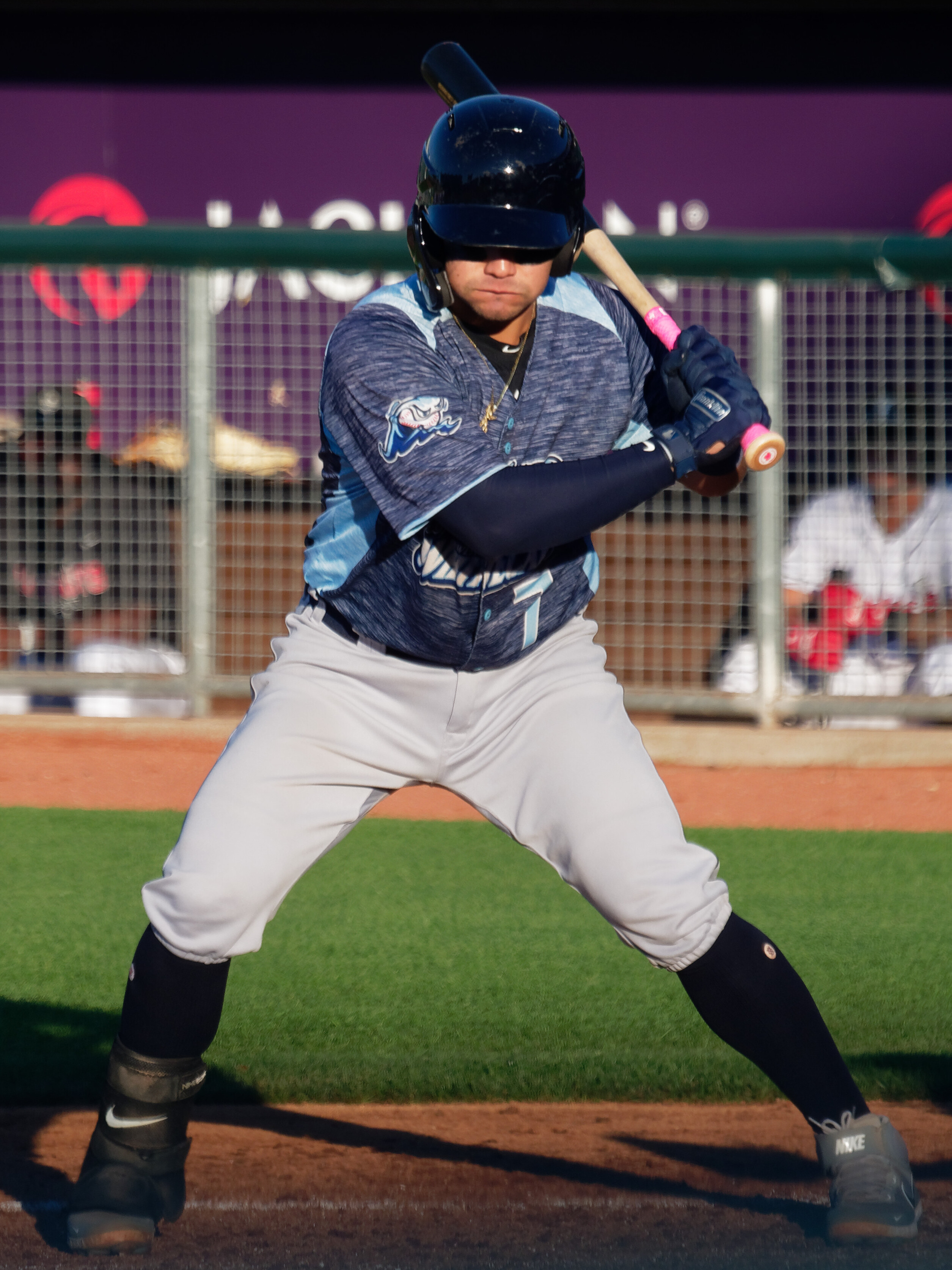
- Alfonzo with the West Michigan Whitecaps in 2021

Los Angeles Dodgers – No. 64
- Catcher
- Born: September 23, 1999 (age 27); Barcelona, Venezuela
- Bats: Switch Throws: Right

MLB debut
- July 5, 2026, for the Los Angeles Dodgers

MLB statistics (through 2026 season)
- Batting average: .179
- Home runs: 0
- Runs batted in: 4
- Stats at Baseball Reference

Teams
- Los Angeles Dodgers (2026–present)

Eliézer Vicente Alfonzo (born September 23, 1999) is a Venezuelan professional baseball catcher for the Los Angeles Dodgers of Major League Baseball (MLB). He made his MLB debut in 2026.

== Career ==
=== Detroit Tigers ===
Alfonzo signed with the Detroit Tigers as an international free agent on July 4, 2016. He began his career with the Tigers affiliate in the Dominican Summer League before being moved to the US based Gulf Coast League Tigers in 2018. He hit .318 in 48 games for the Connecticut Tigers in 2019 before missing the 2020 season due to the COVID-19 pandemic.

In 2021 Alfonzo played in 98 games in the Tigers farm system, split between the Lakeland Flying Tigers and the West Michigan Whitecaps, batting .287 with eight home runs and 55 RBI. He only played in 21 games in 2022 because of various injuries He then spent most of 2023 with West Michigan, where he hit .264 in 94 games and then was promoted to the Double-A Erie SeaWolves in 2024, hitting .255 in 97 games. Alfonzo spent most of 2025 back in Erie before a late season promotion to the Triple-A Toledo Mud Hens. He hit .247 in 65 games between the two levels.

=== Los Angeles Dodgers ===
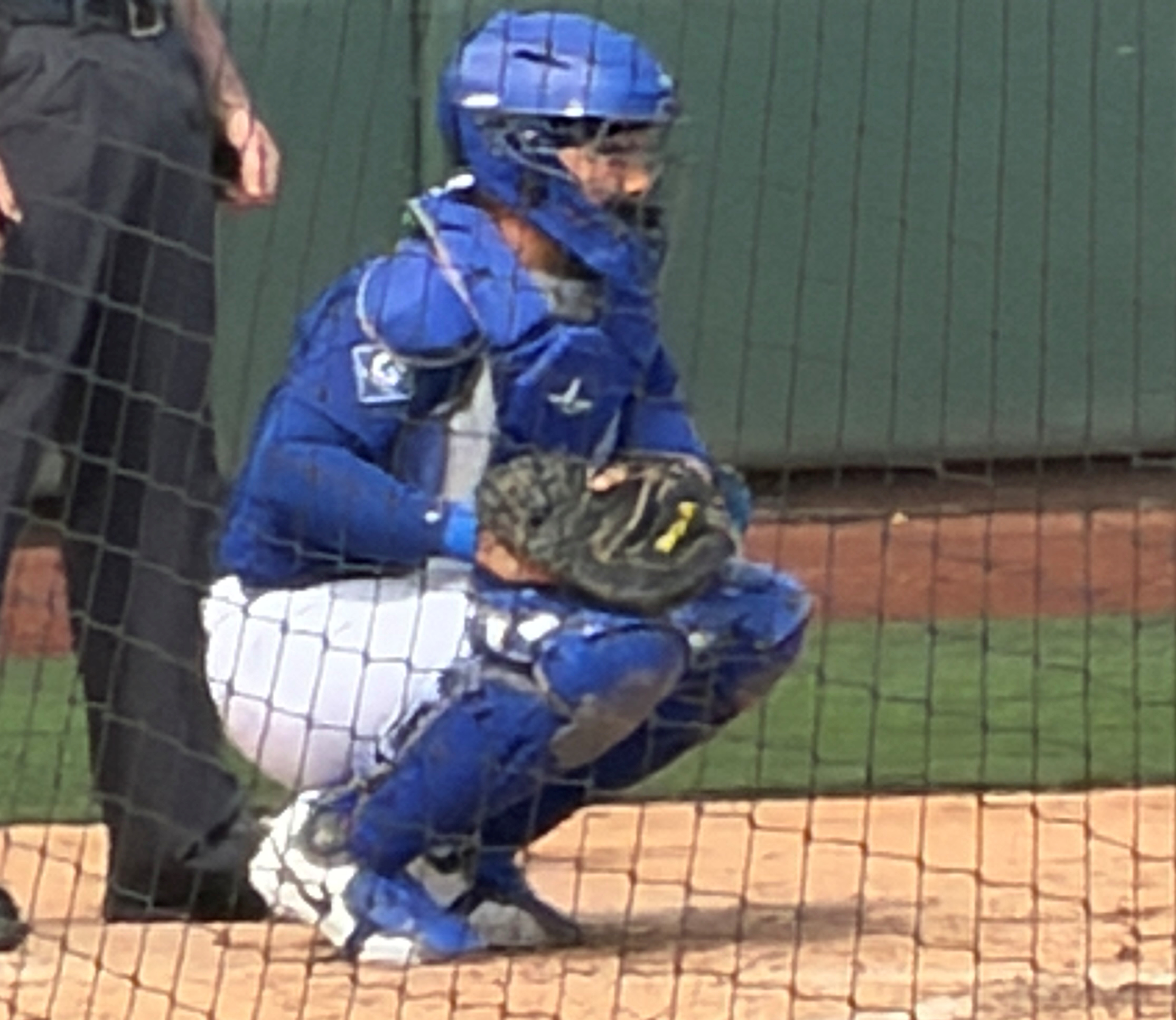
Alfonzo playing for the Dodgers in spring training

On November 17, 2025, Alfonzo signed a minor league contract with the Los Angeles Dodgers that included an invitation to major league spring training. He was assigned to the Triple–A Oklahoma City Comets to begin the 2026 season. Alfonzo had his contract purchased by the Dodgers and he was called up to the majors for the first time on July 4, 2026. Alfonzo Jr. made his major league debut the following day, starting at catcher against the San Diego Padres. On July 19, against the New York Yankees, he recorded his first major league base hit off of Ryan Yarbrough. In 13 games for the Dodgers, Alfonzo had five hits in 28 at-bats (.179 average) and drove in four runs. He spent most of the season with the Comets, where he batted .302 in 66 games.

== Personal life ==
Alfonzo is the son of former MLB player Eliézer Alfonzo and the brother of New York Yankees minor league player Omar Alfonzo. On the day of his MLB debut, his stepmother and younger sister were found dead as a result of the 2026 Venezuela earthquakes.

== See also ==
- List of Major League Baseball players from Venezuela
- List of second-generation Major League Baseball players
