= Mike Sirota =

American baseball player (born 2003)

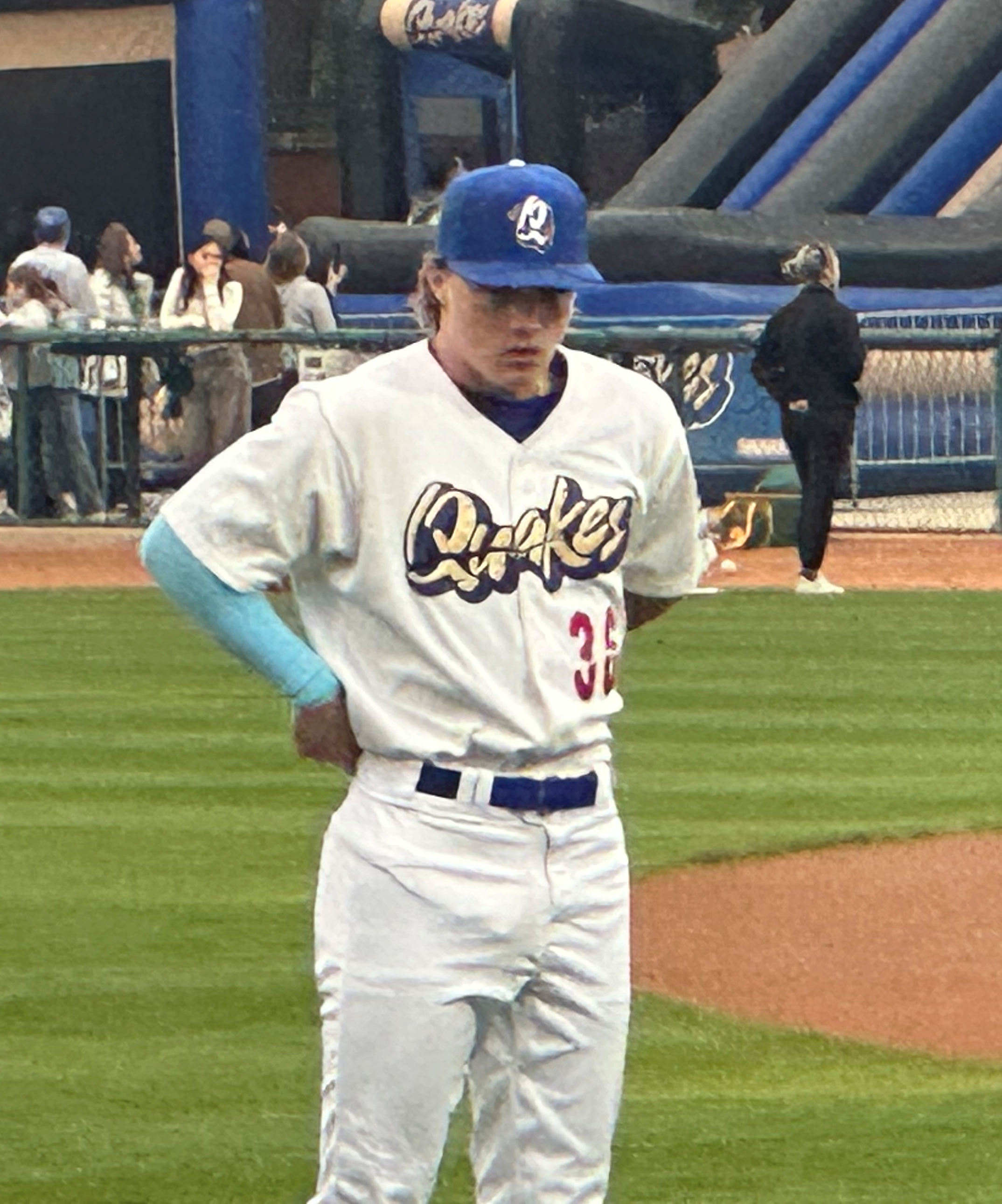
- Sirota with the Rancho Cucamonga Quakes

Los Angeles Dodgers
- Outfielder
- Born: June 16, 2003 (age 23); Mineola, New York, U.S.
- Bats: Right Throws: Right
- Stats at Baseball Reference

Michael Joseph Sirota Jr. (born June 16, 2003) is an American professional baseball outfielder in the Los Angeles Dodgers organization. As one of the top prospects in the Dodgers organization, he played college baseball for the Northeastern Huskies before being drafted in the third round of the 2024 MLB draft by the Cincinnati Reds.

== Early life and amateur career ==
Sirota grew up in the Broad Channel neighborhood of Queens, New York City and attended the Gunnery School in Washington, Connecticut. He was selected in the 16th round of the 2021 Major League Baseball draft by the Los Angeles Dodgers, but he opted not to sign with the team and instead play college baseball at Northeastern University.

Sirota started 37 games during his freshman season with Northeastern and batted .326 with 20 RBIs. He was named first team All-Colonial Athletic Association (CAA) and a third-team All-American by the American Baseball Coaches Association after hitting .346 with 18 home runs, 54 RBIs, and scoring a school-record 73 runs. Sirota batted .298 with seven home runs as a junior. In 2022, he played collegiate summer baseball with the Brewster Whitecaps and Hyannis Harbor Hawks of the Cape Cod Baseball League, returning to Hyannis in 2023.

== Professional career ==
Sirota was selected in the third round of the 2024 Major League Baseball draft by the Cincinnati Reds. He signed for $863,300.

On January 6, 2025, the Reds traded Sirota and a competitive balance pick in the 2025 MLB draft to the Los Angeles Dodgers in exchange for Gavin Lux. The Dodgers assigned him to the Class-A Rancho Cucamonga Quakes to begin the 2025 season. In 24 games, he batted .354 with seven home runs and 24 RBI. Sirota was promoted to the High-A Great Lakes Loons on May 13. In 35 games for the Loons, he batted .316 with six homers and 30 RBI. He injured his knee on a slide on July 5 and spent the rest of the season on the injured list.

Entering the season as the fourth-ranked prospect in the Dodgers system, Sirota returned to the Loons for 2026. He hit .325 in 35 games with the Loons before being promoted to the Double-A Tulsa Drillers on May 19. On July 17, his 72 games-on-base streak was broken, falling two games short of the minor-league record set at 74 by Andrew Velazquez in 2014. He was later ranked the second-best prospect in the Dodgers system by MLB.com after hitting .327 over 53 games with the Drillers by August 1. In 71 games for Tulsa, he batted .297 with 10 home runs and 40 RBI. Sirota was promoted to the Triple-A Oklahoma City Comets for the last few games of the regular season.

== Personal life ==
Sirota is the great-nephew of Hall of Fame pitcher Whitey Ford.
