= Alex Freeland =

American baseball player (born 2001)

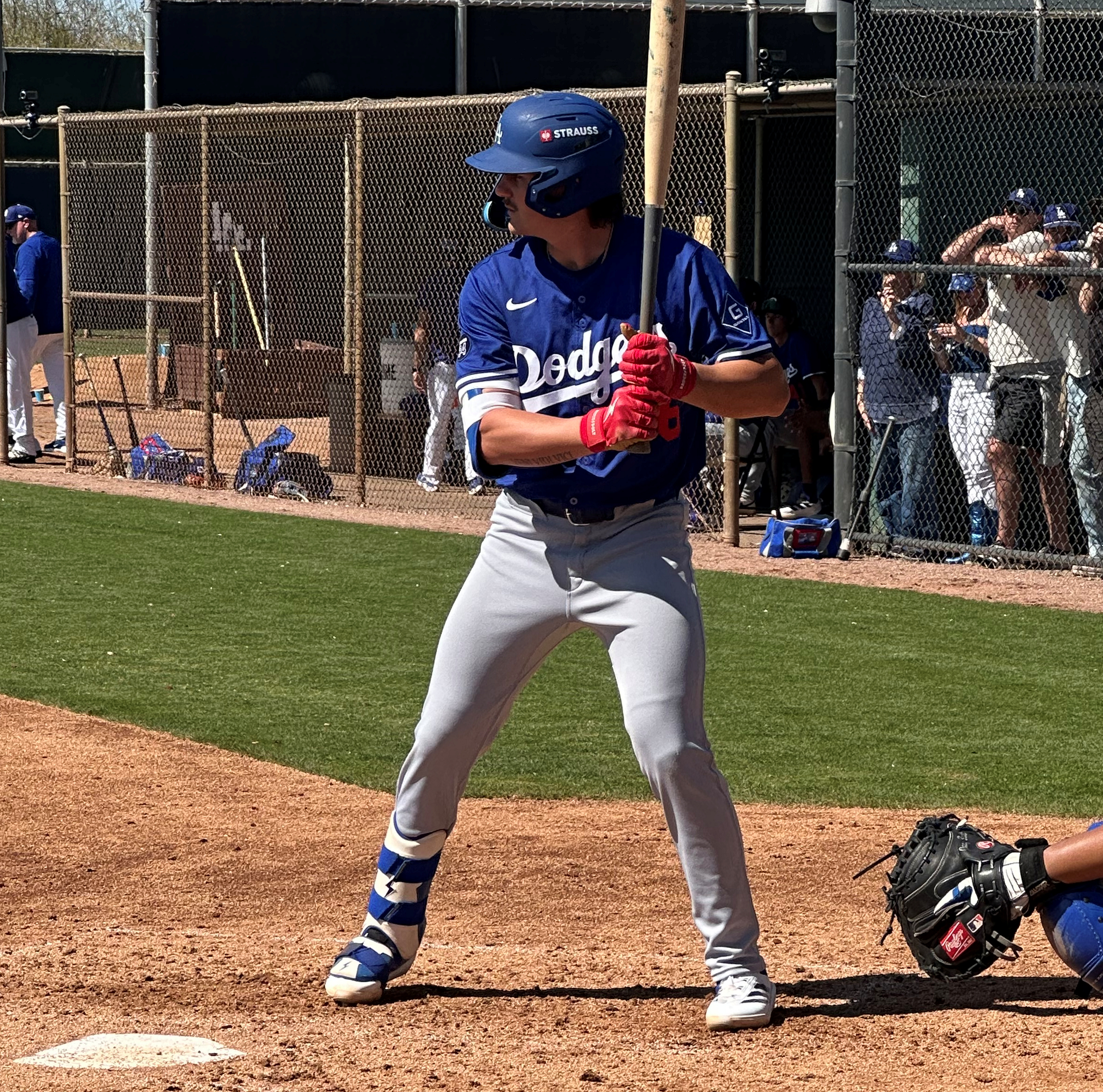
- Freeland with the Los Angeles Dodgers

Los Angeles Dodgers – No. 76
- Infielder
- Born: August 24, 2001 (age 25); Louisville, Kentucky, U.S.
- Bats: Switch Throws: Right

MLB debut
- July 30, 2025, for the Los Angeles Dodgers

MLB statistics (through 2026 season)
- Batting average: .222
- Home runs: 6
- Runs batted in: 27
- Stats at Baseball Reference

Teams
- Los Angeles Dodgers (2025–present)

Alexander Chance Freeland (born August 24, 2001) is an American professional baseball infielder for the Los Angeles Dodgers of Major League Baseball (MLB). He made his MLB debut in 2025.

== Career ==
=== Amateur career ===
Freeland attended Mariner High School in Cape Coral, Florida, and the University of Central Florida (UCF), where he played college baseball for the UCF Knights. In 2021 and 2022, he played collegiate summer baseball with the Brewster Whitecaps of the Cape Cod Baseball League.

=== Los Angeles Dodgers ===
The Los Angeles Dodgers selected Freeland in the third round of the 2022 Major League Baseball draft. He signed with the Dodgers and made his professional debut with the Rancho Cucamonga Quakes, where he hit .313 in only eight games in the 2022 season. Freeland played 2023 with the Great Lakes Loons, hitting .240 in 106 games with nine homers and 57 RBI and remained with Great Lakes to start the 2024 season before being promoted to the Tulsa Drillers on May 8 and to the Triple–A Oklahoma City Baseball Club on August 6. In a combined 136 games, he batted .260 with 18 home runs, 74 RBI and 31 stolen bases.

Freeland began 2025 with Oklahoma City, before he was selected to the 40-man roster and promoted to the major leagues for the first time on July 29. He made his MLB debut the following day, against the Cincinnati Reds, and recorded his first hit off Nick Martinez. Freeland hit his first major league home run off Yu Darvish of the San Diego Padres on August 22. He played in 29 games for the Dodgers, with a slash line of .190/.292/.310 while hitting two homers and driving in six runs and was optioned back to the minors on September 4. Freeland played in 106 games for Oklahoma City, slashing .263/.384/.451 while hitting 16 home runs and driving in 82 runs.

Freeland made the Dodgers opening day roster for the 2026 season, platooning with Miguel Rojas at second base. He got more playing time at shortstop when Mookie Betts was injured but was optioned back to Oklahoma City when Betts returned from the injured list. Freeland rejoined the roster on May 27 when Kiké Hernández was injured, only to be again optioned when Hernández returned on July 28. He returned again when rosters expanded in September. He played in 89 games for the Dodgers (batting .234 with four home runs and 21 RBI) and in 38 games for the Comets (batting .259 with five home runs and 26 RBI).

== Personal life ==
Freeland was born with a clubfoot and underwent numerous surgeries to correct the issue.
