= Ryan Fitzgerald (baseball) =

American baseball player (born 1994)

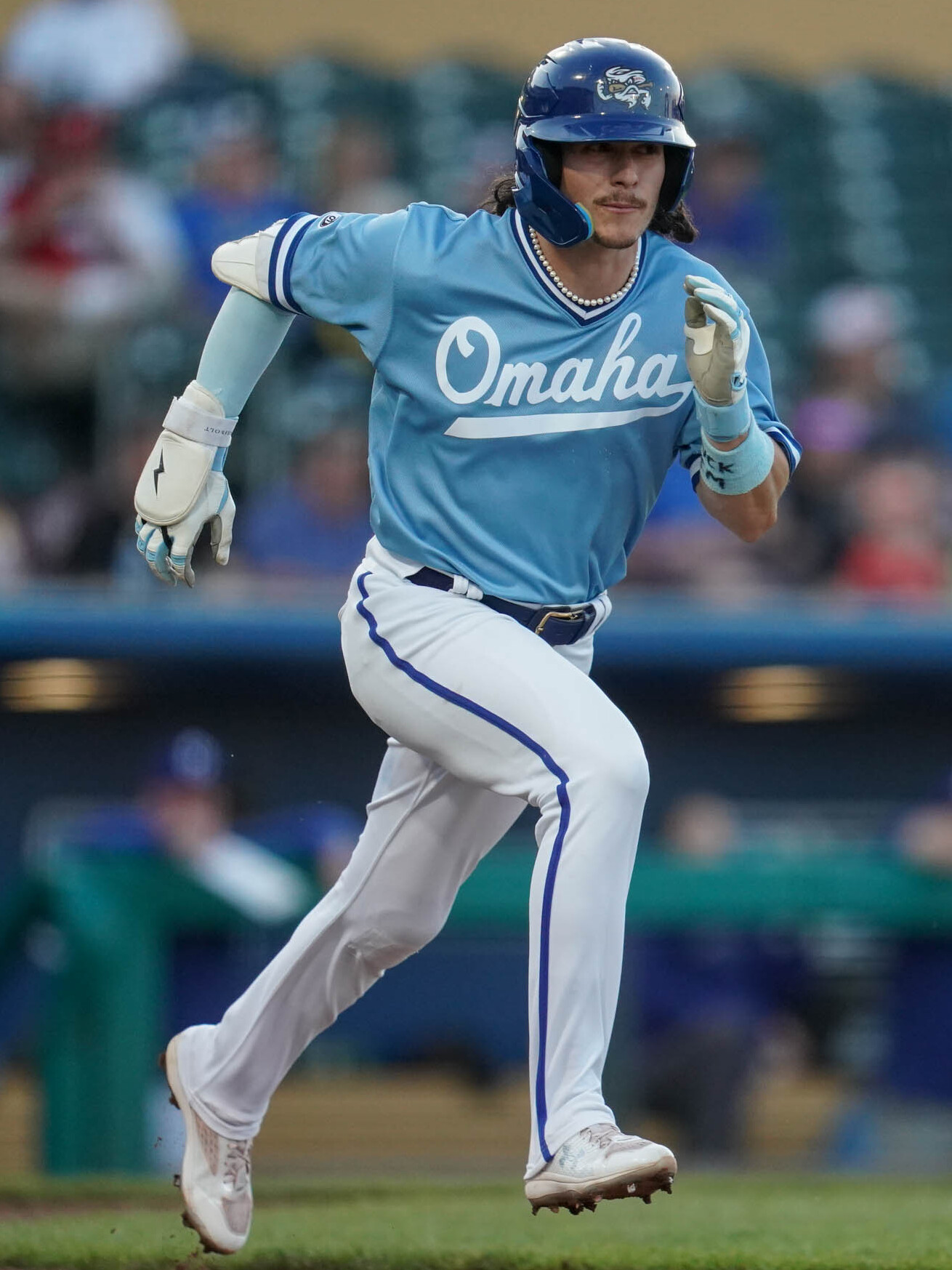
- Fitzgerald with the Omaha Storm Chasers in 2024

Free agent
- Infielder
- Born: June 17, 1994 (age 32); Hinsdale, Illinois, U.S.
- Bats: Left Throws: Right

MLB debut
- May 16, 2025, for the Minnesota Twins

MLB statistics (through 2025 season)
- Batting average: .196
- Home runs: 4
- Runs batted in: 9
- Stats at Baseball Reference

Teams
- Minnesota Twins (2025)

Ryan Fitzgerald (born June 17, 1994) is an American professional baseball infielder who is a free agent. He has previously played in Major League Baseball (MLB) for the Minnesota Twins, for whom he made his MLB debut in 2025.

== Career ==
Fitzgerald grew up in Burr Ridge, Illinois, and attended Fenwick High School. He played college baseball at Creighton University for four seasons. He was named second-team All-Big East Conference as a junior, and had a .230 batting average as a senior.

=== Gary SouthShore RailCats ===
Fitzgerald went unselected in the 2016 MLB draft. He played in the now-defunct Arizona Winter League in the winter of 2016 before signing with the Gary SouthShore RailCats of the independent American Association of Professional Baseball in 2017. In 84 games for Gary, Fitzgerald slashed .239/.301/.395 with seven home runs, 20 RBI, and eight stolen bases.

=== Boston Red Sox ===
Fitzgerald's contract was purchased by the Boston Red Sox organization on May 15, 2018. The Red Sox assigned Fitzgerald to the Greenville Drive of the Single-A South Atlantic League, where he batted .274 with 44 runs scored and 38 RBI. He spent the 2019 season with High-A Salem Red Sox and hit .271 with 125 hits, 63 runs scored, and 65 RBI and was named the organization's defensive player of the year.

Fitzgerald did not play in a game in 2020 due to the cancellation of the minor league season because of the COVID-19 pandemic. He started the 2021 season with the Double-A Portland Sea Dogs. Fitzgerald was promoted to the Triple-A Worcester Red Sox after batting .271 with 13 home runs and 49 RBI in 95 games with Portland.

Fitzgerald participated in Boston's 2022 spring training a non-roster invitee. He was assigned to Worcester to start the 2022 season, ultimately playing in 127 games and hitting .219/.304/.400 with 16 home runs and 72 RBI. Fitzgerald split the 2023 campaign between the rookie-level Florida Complex League Red Sox and Worcester, slashing .268/.348/.491 with 12 home runs, 60 RBI, and 11 stolen bases across 99 combined appearances.

=== Kansas City Royals ===
On December 6, 2023, Fitzgerald was selected by the Kansas City Royals in the minor league phase of the Rule 5 draft. In 108 games for the Triple-A Omaha Storm Chasers, he batted .244/.336/.418 with 14 home runs and 54 RBI. Fitzgerald elected free agency following the season on November 4, 2024.

=== Minnesota Twins ===
On January 16, 2025, the Minnesota Twins signed Fitzgerald to a minor league contract. In 36 appearances for the Triple-A St. Paul Saints, he slashed .320/.417/.516 with four home runs, 21 RBI, and three stolen bases. On May 16, Fitzgerald was selected to the 40-man roster and promoted to the major leagues for the first time. He scored his first big league run on May 19, while pinch running for Ty France. The run helped Minnesota win the game, coming of a walk-off double by Kody Clemens. On August 10, Fitzgerald recorded his first MLB hit, a two-run go-ahead home run off of Ryan Bergert of the Kansas City Royals. In 24 appearances for Minnesota during his rookie campaign, he batted .196/.302/.457 with four home runs, nine RBI, and one stolen base. On January 2, 2026, Fitzgerald was designated for assignment by the Twins following the acquisition of Eric Wagaman.

=== Los Angeles Dodgers ===
On January 9, 2026, Fitzgerald was claimed off waivers by the Los Angeles Dodgers, only to be designated for assignment a few days later, on January 13. He cleared waivers on January 20 and was sent outright to the minors. He was assigned to the Triple-A Oklahoma City Comets to start the season. With the Comets, he played in 137 games, batting .315 with 16 home runs and 102 RBI. He was third in the Pacific Coast League in RBI and led the league in hits (172) and doubles (35). He elected free agency on November 2.
