= 2022 Toronto Blue Jays season =

2022 Toronto Blue Jays
- American League Wild Card
- League: American League
- Division: East
- Ballpark: Rogers Centre
- City: Toronto, Ontario
- Record: 92–70 (.568)
- Divisional place: 2nd
- Owners: Rogers, CEO Mark Shapiro
- General managers: Ross Atkins
- Managers: Charlie Montoyo (Fired July 13); John Schneider (Interim)
- Television: Sportsnet; Sportsnet One (Dan Shulman, Buck Martinez, Pat Tabler, Matt Devlin)
- Radio: Blue Jays Radio Network; Sportsnet 590 the FAN (Ben Wagner)

The 2022 Toronto Blue Jays season was the franchise's 46th season in Major League Baseball, and 31st full season (33rd overall) at Rogers Centre.

On December 2, 2021, Commissioner of Baseball Rob Manfred announced a lockout of players, following expiration of the collective bargaining agreement (CBA) between the league and the Major League Baseball Players Association (MLBPA). On March 10, 2022, MLB and the MLBPA agreed to a new collective bargaining agreement, thus ending the lockout. Opening Day was rescheduled for April 7, one week later than the original March 31 date, affecting two series for each team.

Although MLB previously announced that any cancelled games due to the lockout would not be rescheduled, the agreement provides for a complete 162-game season. The three home games against the Tampa Bay Rays were rescheduled to be played in the Rays' two other visits, creating two five-game series, while the series at Baltimore was added to the end of the season.

On July 13, the Blue Jays dismissed manager Charlie Montoyo after starting the month 3–9. Bench coach John Schneider replaced Montoyo as interim manager. In Montoyo's four years with Toronto, he had a record of 236–236 (.500). The Jays would rebound under Schneider, going 46-28 the rest of the way, including a historic 28–5 win against the Red Sox on July 22.

On September 29, Toronto clinched their first wild card berth since the pandemic-shortened 2020 season and their first in a full season since 2016. Toronto also clinched home field advantage for the American League Wild Card Series, in which they were swept by the Seattle Mariners in two games, with losses of 4–0 and 10–9.

== Previous season ==
The Blue Jays finished the 2021 Major League Baseball season with a 91–71 record, which placed them fourth in the American League East division, missing the postseason by one win.

== Offseason ==
=== Lockout ===
The expiration of the league's collective bargaining agreement (CBA) with the Major League Baseball Players Association occurred on December 1, 2021, with no new agreement in place. As a result, the team owners voted unanimously to lockout the players stopping all free agency and trades.

The parties came to an agreement on a new CBA on March 10, 2022.

=== Rule changes ===
Pursuant to the new CBA, several new rules were instituted for the 2022 season. The National League will adopt the designated hitter full-time, a draft lottery will be implemented, the postseason will expand from ten teams to twelve, and advertising patches will appear on player uniforms and helmets for the first time.

== Standings ==
=== American League East ===
AL East
Team	W	L	Pct.	GB	Home	Road
New York Yankees	99	63	.611	—	57‍–‍24	42‍–‍39
Toronto Blue Jays	92	70	.568	7	47‍–‍34	45‍–‍36
Tampa Bay Rays	86	76	.531	13	51‍–‍30	35‍–‍46
Baltimore Orioles	83	79	.512	16	45‍–‍36	38‍–‍43
Boston Red Sox	78	84	.481	21	43‍–‍38	35‍–‍46

=== American League Wild Card ===
Division leaders
Team	W	L	Pct.
Houston Astros	106	56	.654
New York Yankees	99	63	.611
Cleveland Guardians	92	70	.568

Wild Card teams (Top 3 teams qualify for postseason)
Team	W	L	Pct.	GB
Toronto Blue Jays	92	70	.568	+6
Seattle Mariners	90	72	.556	+4
Tampa Bay Rays	86	76	.531	—
Baltimore Orioles	83	79	.512	3
Chicago White Sox	81	81	.500	5
Minnesota Twins	78	84	.481	8
Boston Red Sox	78	84	.481	8
Los Angeles Angels	73	89	.451	13
Texas Rangers	68	94	.420	18
Detroit Tigers	66	96	.407	20
Kansas City Royals	65	97	.401	21
Oakland Athletics	60	102	.370	26

=== Record against opponents ===
2022 American League record Source: MLB Standings Grid – 2022
Team	BAL	BOS	CWS	CLE	DET	HOU	KC	LAA	MIN	NYY	OAK	SEA	TB	TEX	TOR	NL
Baltimore	—	9–10	5–2	3–3	1–5	4–3	4–3	6–1	3–4	7–12	3–4	2–4	9–10	6–0	9–10	12–8
Boston	10–9	—	2–4	5–2	5–1	4–2	3–4	4–3	3–4	6–13	5–1	6–1	7–12	6–1	3–16	9–11
Chicago	2–5	4–2	—	7–12	12–7	3–4	9–10	3–4	9–10	3–4	5–2	4–2	4–2	3–4	2–4	11–9
Cleveland	3–3	2–5	12–7	—	10–9	3–4	12–7	3–4	13–6	1–5	6–1	1–6	4–2	5–1	5–2	12–8
Detroit	5–1	1–5	7–12	9–10	—	0–7	10–9	3–3	8–11	1–5	2–5	1–6	2–5	4–3	2–5	11–9
Houston	3–4	2–4	4–3	4–3	7–0	—	5–2	13–6	6–0	5–2	12–7	12–7	5–1	14–5	2–4	12–8
Kansas City	3–4	4–3	10–9	7–12	9–10	2–5	—	3–3	7–12	1–6	3–3	2–4	3–4	2–4	2–5	7–13
Los Angeles	1–6	3–4	4–3	4–3	3–3	6–13	3–3	—	4–2	2–4	12–7	10–9	2–5	9–10	3–4	7–13
Minnesota	4–3	4–3	10–9	6–13	11–8	0–6	12–7	2–4	—	2–5	5–1	4–3	4–2	2–5	4–3	8–12
New York	12–7	13–6	4–3	5–1	5–1	2–5	6–1	4–2	5–2	—	5–2	2–4	11–8	4–3	11–8	10–10
Oakland	4–3	1–5	2–5	1–6	5–2	7–12	3–3	7–12	1–5	2–5	—	8–11	3–4	8–11	3–3	5–15
Seattle	4–2	1–6	2–4	6–1	6–1	7–12	4–2	9–10	3–4	4–2	11–8	—	2–5	14–5	5–2	12–8
Tampa Bay	10–9	12–7	2–4	2–4	5–2	1–5	4–3	5–2	2–4	8–11	4–3	5–2	—	4–3	10–9	12–8
Texas	0–6	1–6	4–3	1–5	3–4	5–14	4–2	10–9	5–2	3–4	11–8	5–14	3–4	—	2–4	11–9
Toronto	10–9	16–3	4–2	2–5	5–2	4–2	5–2	4–3	3–4	8–11	3–3	2–5	9–10	4–2	—	13–7

Updated with the results of all games through October 5, 2022.

== Records vs. opponents ==
	Record			Games Left		
Opponent	Home	Road	Total	Home	Road	Total
AL East
Baltimore Orioles	5–5	5–4	10–9	–	–	–
Boston Red Sox	8–2	8–1	16–3	–	–	–
New York Yankees	3–6	5–5	8–11	–	–	–
Tampa Bay Rays	5–5	4–5	9–10	–	–	–
Totals	21–18	22–15	43–33	–	–	–
AL Central
Chicago White Sox	3–0	1–2	4–2	–	–	–
Cleveland Guardians	1–2	1–3	2–5	–	–	–
Detroit Tigers	3–1	2–1	5–2	–	–	–
Kansas City Royals	3–1	2–1	5–2	–	–	–
Minnesota Twins	1–2	2–2	3–4	–	–	–
Totals	11–6	8–9	19–15	–	–	–
AL West
Houston Astros	2–1	2–1	4–2	–	–	–
Los Angeles Angels	0–3	4–0	4–3	–	–	–
Oakland Athletics	2–1	1–2	3–3	–	–	–
Seattle Mariners	2–1	0–4	2–5	–	–	–
Texas Rangers	2–1	2–1	4–2	–	–	–
Totals	8–7	9–8	17–15	–	–	–
National League
Chicago Cubs	2–1	–	2–1	–	–	–
Cincinnati Reds	2–1	–	2–1	–	–	–
Milwaukee Brewers	–	1–2	1–2	–	–	–
Philadelphia Phillies	2–0	1–1	3–1	–	–	–
Pittsburgh Pirates	–	3–0	3–0	–	–	–
St. Louis Cardinals	1–1	1–1	2–2	–	–	–
Totals	7–3	6–4	13–7	–	–	–
Grand Totals	47–34	45–36	92–70	–	–	–

Month	Games	Won	Lost	Pct.
April	22	14	8	.636
May	26	14	12	.538
June	28	15	13	.536
July	26	14	12	.538
August	27	13	14	.481
September	28	18	10	.643
October	5	4	1	.800
Totals	162	92	70	.568

== 2022 draft ==
The 2022 Major League Baseball draft began on July 17. The Blue Jays gained compensation selections at the end of the second round due to Robbie Ray and Marcus Semien signing with the Seattle Mariners and Texas Rangers respectively.

Round	Pick	Player	Position	College/School	Nationality	Signed
1	23	Brandon Barriera	LHP	American Heritage School	(United States)	July 26
2	60	Josh Kasevich	SS	Oregon	(United States)	July 26
2C	77	Tucker Toman	SS	Hammond School	(United States)	July 24
2C	78	Cade Doughty	2B	Louisiana State	(United States)	July 23
3	98	Alan Roden	OF	Creighton	(United States)	July 26
4	128	Ryan Jennings	RHP	Louisiana Tech	(United States)	July 24
5	158	Mason Fluharty	LHP	Liberty	(United States)	July 22
6	188	T. J. Brock	RHP	Ohio State	(United States)	July 22
7	218	Peyton Williams	1B	Iowa	(United States)	July 26
8	248	Dylan Rock	OF	Texas A&M	(United States)	July 26
9	278	Devereaux Harrison	RHP	Long Beach State	(United States)	July 26
10	308	Ian Churchill	LHP	San Diego	(United States)	July 26

== Regular season ==
=== Opening Day ===
Opening Day starters
Position	Name
Catcher	Danny Jansen
First baseman	Vladimir Guerrero Jr.
Second baseman	Cavan Biggio
Shortstop	Bo Bichette
Third baseman	Matt Chapman
Left fielder	Lourdes Gurriel Jr.
Center fielder	George Springer
Right fielder	Teoscar Hernández
Designated hitter	Alejandro Kirk
Pitcher	José Berríos

=== April ===
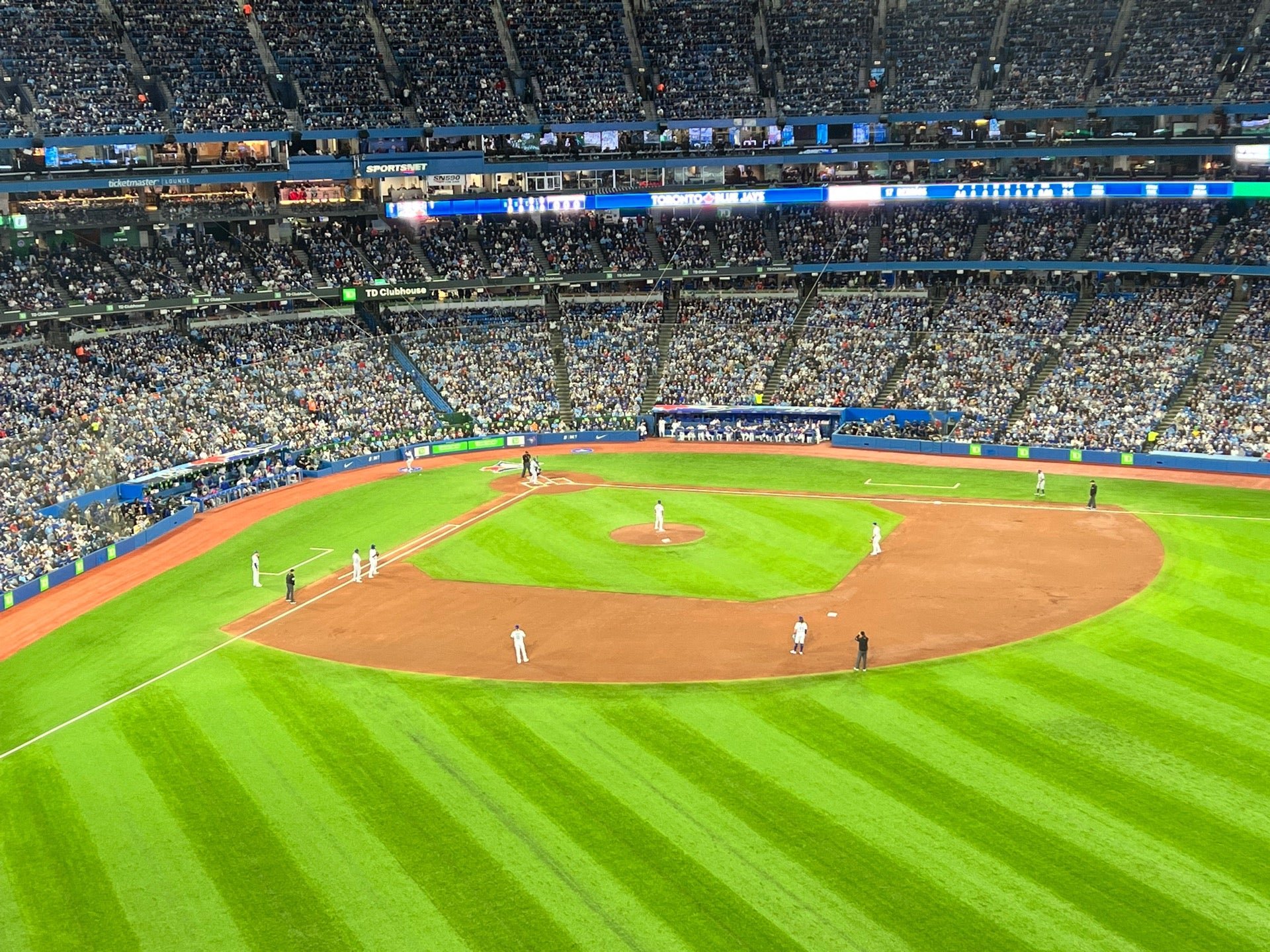
Home and season opener against the Texas Rangers on April 8

The Blue Jays opened the 2022 season at home against the Texas Rangers. After falling behind 7–0 in the fourth inning, Toronto launched the largest comeback victory on Opening Day in 72 years, winning 10–8. The Blue Jays would take the second game, 4–3, before losing the final game of the series, 12–6. The team then began its first road series of the season, taking on the New York Yankees in the Bronx. The Blue Jays won the first game of the four-game set, 3–0, and Jordan Romano earned his 26th consecutive save, breaking Tom Henke's franchise record. After dropping the second game, 4–0, the Jays took the third game 6–4, aided largely by three home runs from Vladimir Guerrero Jr. The Yankees took the final game of the series, 3–0, to split the series at two games apiece. Returning home, the Blue Jays began a three-game series against the Oakland Athletics with a 4–1 victory. The second game went into the ninth inning tied at five, until Cristian Pache hit a two-run home run to give Oakland the game 7–5. The Blue Jays won the final game, 4–3, backed by another strong performance from Alek Manoah.

Toronto began a six-game road trip in Boston the following night, where Bo Bichette's first two errors of the season helped the Red Sox to a 2–1 win. Raimel Tapia's first home run of the season paced the Jays to a 6–1 victory in the second game, and Kevin Gausman's eight shutout innings in the third and final game helped the Jays to a 3–2 win in the finale. In the first game of a three-game series against the Houston Astros, Matt Chapman's ninth-inning double drove in Vladimir Guerrero Jr. to give the Blue Jays a 4–3 victory. Santiago Espinal broke a tie in the seventh inning of the second game, giving the Jays a 3–2 win. However, the team had its four-game winning streak snapped in the final game of the series, losing 8–7 in the tenth inning. On April 25, the Blue Jays returned to Toronto to begin a ten-game homestand, starting with four games against the Red Sox. Bo Bichette's first-career grand slam in the eighth inning gave the first game to the Jays, 6–2. In the second game, Boston scored four runs in the eighth inning to take a 5–2 lead. In the ninth inning, back-to-back doubles from Raimel Tapia and Santiago Espinal scored a run, and George Springer's two-run home run tied the game at five and sent it to a tenth inning, where Tapia hit a walk-off sacrifice fly. Boston took the third game, 7–1, with manager Alex Cora returning from having COVID-19. The Blue Jays took the series victory with a 1–0 win in the final game, led by Alek Manoah's seven shutout innings. To close the month, the Jays dropped the opening game of the series against Houston 11–7, but bounced back in the second game with a 2–1 victory to end April with a 14–8 record.

=== May ===
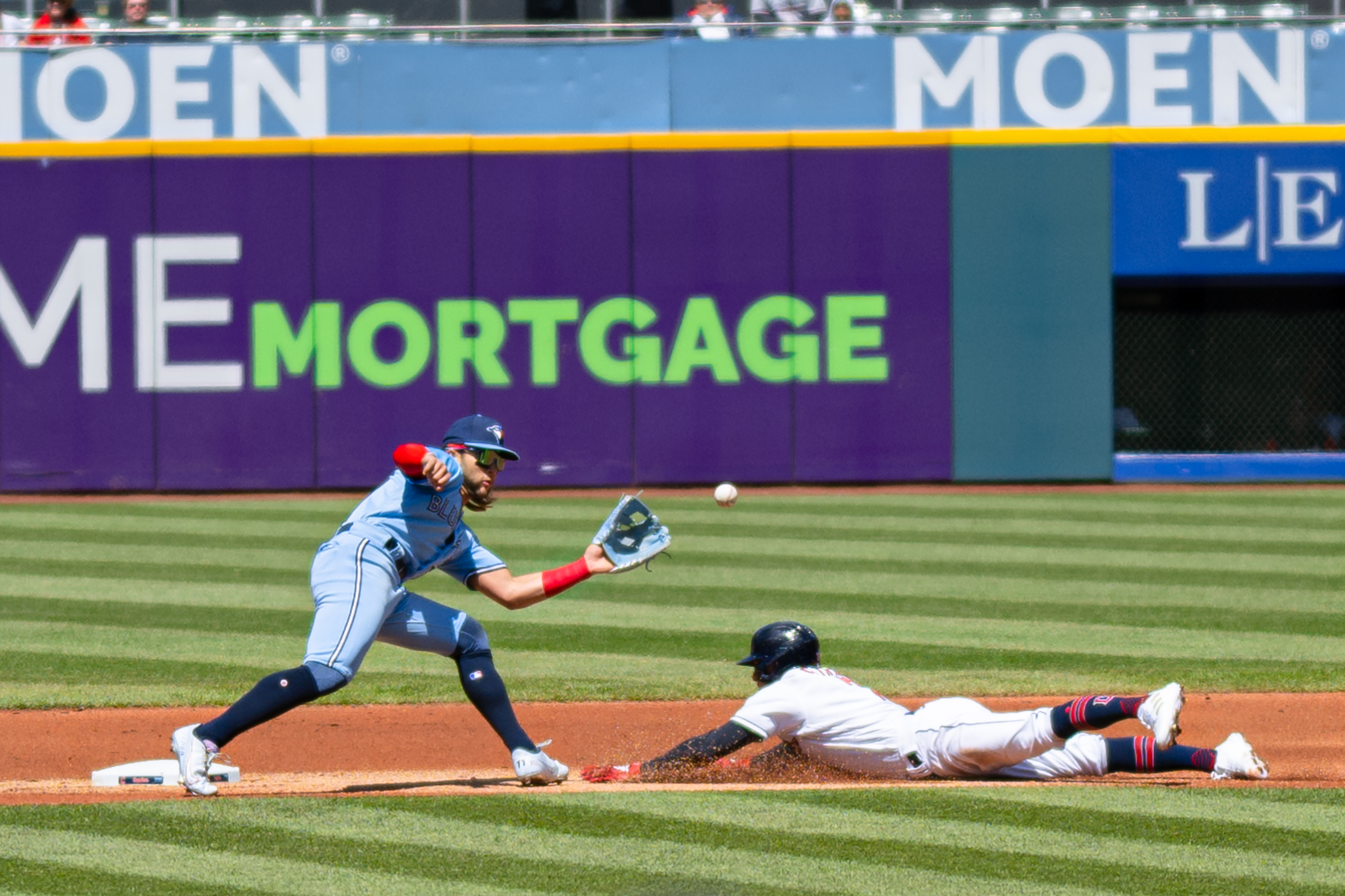
Myles Straw is caught stealing in the Blue Jays 8–3 victory over the Cleveland Guardians at Progressive Field on May 7.

To begin May, the Blue Jays took the final game of the three-game series against the Astros, 3–2. Ending their ten-game homestand, the Jays took on the Yankees. Toronto dropped the first two games of the series, 3–2 and 9–1 respectively, but salvaged the final game 2–1, ending the Yankees' 11-game winning streak and taking their first series loss of the 2022 season. The Blue Jays then embarked on a nine-game road trip, beginning with four against the Cleveland Guardians. Rookie Steven Kwan's first home run helped Cleveland to a 6–5 victory in the opener. The second game was rained out, and rescheduled as a doubleheader for the following day. The teams split the games, with Toronto taking the first 8–3 and Cleveland taking the second, 8–2. The Guardians took the series with a 4–3 win in the finale. After a day off, the Blue Jays were swept in a brief two-game series in New York against the Yankees. With a 1–5 record on their road trip, the Blue Jays travelled to Tampa Bay for the first time in 2022, to take on the Rays. Toronto lost the opener, 5–2, which extended their losing streak to five games and lowered their record to 17–16. The Jays ended their losing streak with a 5–1 victory in the second game, before dropping their fourth straight series with a 3–0 loss in the finale.

The Jays returned home after a dismal 2–7 road trip to take on Seattle and Cincinnati. Home runs from Bo Bichette and Matt Chapman led the Jays to a 6–2 win in the opener against the Mariners. The Jays took the second game 3–0 but were unable to complete the sweep, dropping the final game 5–1. The Blue Jays had another opportunity for a sweep, taking the first two games against Cincinnati by scores of 2–1 and 3–1, but again lost the finale, 3–2, after Toronto native Joey Votto's first home run of the season gave the Reds the lead. The Jays then travelled to St. Louis for two games against the Cardinals. Paul Goldschmidt hit a walk-off grand slam in the first game, giving the Cards a 7–3 victory. Toronto salvaged the final game of the series, 8–1, led by two home runs from Danny Jansen. After a day off, the Blue Jays travelled to Los Angeles for four games against the Angels. Vladimir Guerrero Jr., the 2021 AL MVP runner-up, hit a home run off 2021 MVP winner Shohei Ohtani in the opener, leading the Jays to a 6–3 win. The Blue Jays rallied in the ninth inning of the second game, with Lourdes Gurriel Jr.'s RBI single proving to be the difference in a 4–3 victory. The Jays entered the seventh inning of the third game down 4–1, but scored five runs and then held on to win the game 6–5. Toronto earned their first sweep of the 2022 season with an 11–10 win in the final game of the series, and closed May with their sixth consecutive win after defeating the Chicago White Sox 6–5.

=== June ===
The Blue Jays began June by completing a three-game sweep of the White Sox at home, and winning their eight consecutive game. The streak, which was their longest since 2015, was snapped on June 3 by the Minnesota Twins with a 9–3 loss. Kyle Garlick and Jose Miranda both homered twice for the Twins.

=== July ===
From July 2 to 10, the Blue Jays lost nine of ten games, culminating in a three-game sweep at the hands of the Seattle Mariners at T-Mobile Park. On July 22, the Blue Jays defeated the Red Sox 28–5 at Fenway Park, which featured an inside-the-park grand slam by the Blue Jays' Ramiel Tapia. Their 28 runs was the franchise record for most runs in a game while the red Sox also set a record for most runs given up in a single game.

=== August ===
From August 18 to 21, the Blue Jays took three games out of four from the Yankees at Yankee Stadium, with the Yankees salvaging the last game of the series to avoid a four-game sweep. In their next series, they swept the Red Sox on the road in a three-game set. However, they were swept in three games at home by the Angels (who had a record of 52–73) in the following series which included being shutout in consecutive games, with Shohei Ohtani throwing seven scoreless innings and striking out nine on the latter occasion. Prior to the second game, the Blue Jays held a pre-game ceremony honouring members of the 1992 World Series Championship team for a 30th anniversary celebration.

=== September ===
On September 29, the Blue Jays clinched a playoff spot for the ninth time in franchise history.

=== Game log ===
Legend
Blue Jays win	Blue Jays loss	Game postponed

2022 Game Log: 92–70 (Home: 47–34; Road: 45–36)
April: 14–8 (Home: 8–4; Road: 6–4)

#	Date	Opponent	Score	Win	Loss	Save	Attendance	Record	GB
1	April 8	Rangers	10–8	Cimber (1–0)	Santana (0–1)	Romano (1)	45,022	1–0	–
2	April 9	Rangers	4–3	Richards (1–0)	Martin (0–1)	Romano (2)	43,386	2–0	–
3	April 10	Rangers	6–12	Burke (1–0)	Merryweather (0–1)	—	31,549	2–1	1
4	April 11	@ Yankees	3–0	Manoah (1–0)	Taillon (0–1)	Romano (3)	26,211	3–1	–
5	April 12	@ Yankees	0–4	Holmes (1–0)	Kikuchi (0–1)	—	25,068	3–2	1
6	April 13	@ Yankees	6–4	Cimber (2–0)	Green (0–1)	Romano (4)	30,109	4–2	–
7	April 14	@ Yankees	0–3	Severino (1–0)	Gausman (0–1)	King (1)	37,255	4–3	–
8	April 15	Athletics	4–1	Cimber (3–0)	Jefferies (1–1)	Romano (5)	35,415	5–3	+1
9	April 16	Athletics	5–7	Jiménez (1–0)	Merryweather (0–2)	Trivino (2)	32,330	5–4	–
10	April 17	Athletics	4–3	Manoah (2–0)	Oller (0–1)	Romano (6)	27,490	6–4	+½
11	April 19	@ Red Sox	1–2	Robles (1–0)	García (0–1)	Whitlock (1)	31,640	6–5	—
12	April 20	@ Red Sox	6–1	Berríos (1–0)	Pivetta (0–3)	—	33,354	7–5	–
13	April 21	@ Red Sox	3–2	Gausman (1–1)	Houck (1–1)	Romano (7)	35,792	8–5	+1
14	April 22	@ Astros	4–3	Mayza (1–0)	Neris (1–1)	Romano (8)	36,757	9–5	+1
15	April 23	@ Astros	3–2	Manoah (3–0)	Taylor (0–1)	Cimber (1)	36,075	10–5	+1
16	April 24	@ Astros	7–8 (10)	Taylor (1–1)	Romano (0–1)	—	39,534	10–6	–
17	April 25	Red Sox	6–2	Cimber (4–0)	Strahm (1–1)	—	20,981	11–6	+½
18	April 26	Red Sox	6–5 (10)	Romano (1–1)	Barnes (0–1)	—	22,611	12–6	+½
19	April 27	Red Sox	1–7	Wacha (2–0)	Thornton (0–1)	—	20,468	12–7	½
20	April 28	Red Sox	1–0	Manoah (4–0)	Whitlock (1–1)	Romano (9)	23,144	13–7	½
21	April 29	Astros	7–11	Urquidy (2–1)	Thornton (0–2)	—	35,066	13–8	1½
22	April 30	Astros	2–1	Berríos (2–0)	García (1–1)	Romano (10)	40,732	14–8	1½

May: 14–12 (Home: 7–4; Road: 7–8)

#	Date	Opponent	Score	Win	Loss	Save	Attendance	Record	GB
23	May 1	Astros	3–2	Gausman (2–1)	Valdez (1–2)	Romano (11)	31,802	15–8	1½
24	May 2	Yankees	2–3	Holmes (2–0)	García (0–2)	Green (1)	18,577	15–9	2½
25	May 3	Yankees	1–9	Taillon (2–1)	Cimber (4–1)	—	22,491	15–10	3½
26	May 4	Yankees	2–1	Kikuchi (1–1)	Cortés Jr. (1–1)	Romano (12)	29,057	16–10	2½
27	May 5	@ Guardians	5–6	Civale (1–2)	Berríos (2–1)	Clase (5)	9,104	16–11	3
—	May 6	@ Guardians	Postponed (rain); Makeup: May 7						
28	May 7 (1)	@ Guardians	8–3	Gausman (3–1)	Bieber (1–2)	—	see 2nd game	17–11	2½
29	May 7 (2)	@ Guardians	2–8	McKenzie (2–2)	Stripling (0–1)	—	16,819	17–12	3
30	May 8	@ Guardians	3–4	Shaw (1–0)	Cimber (4–2)	Clase (6)	14,787	17–13	3½
31	May 10	@ Yankees	5–6	Peralta (1–0)	Romano (1–2)	—	41,522	17–14	5
32	May 11	@ Yankees	3–5	Taillon (3–1)	Berríos (2–2)	Chapman (8)	42,105	17–15	6
33	May 13	@ Rays	2–5	Kittredge (3–0)	Gausman (3–2)	Adam (1)	10,169	17–16	7½
34	May 14	@ Rays	5–1	Mayza (2–0)	Thompson (1–2)	—	15,195	18–16	6½
35	May 15	@ Rays	0–3	Wisler (2–1)	Manoah (4–1)	Kittredge (5)	20,832	18–17	7½
36	May 16	Mariners	6–2	Kikuchi (2–1)	Flexen (1–6)	Cimber (2)	28,207	19–17	7½
37	May 17	Mariners	3–0	Berríos (3–2)	Gilbert (4–2)	Cimber (3)	22,988	20–17	7½
38	May 18	Mariners	1–5	Gonzales (2–4)	Gausman (3–3)	—	20,472	20–18	8½
39	May 20	Reds	2–1	Ryu (1–0)	Castillo (0–2)	Romano (13)	29,300	21–18	7½
40	May 21	Reds	3–1	Manoah (5–1)	Cessa (2–1)	Romano (14)	39,393	22–18	7½
41	May 22	Reds	2–3	Díaz (2–0)	García (0–3)	Warren (2)	42,323	22–19	7
42	May 23	@ Cardinals	3–7 (10)	Cabrera (2–1)	Phelps (0–1)	—	36,033	22–20	7
43	May 24	@ Cardinals	8–1	Gausman (4–3)	Hicks (1–4)	—	33,797	23–20	7
44	May 26	@ Angels	6–3	Ryu (2–0)	Ohtani (3–3)	—	28,228	24–20	7½
45	May 27	@ Angels	4–3	Richards (2–0)	Iglesias (1–3)	Romano (15)	44,641	25–20	7½
46	May 28	@ Angels	6–5	Cimber (5–2)	Barraclough (0–1)	Stripling (1)	34,005	26–20	6½
47	May 29	@ Angels	11–10	Cimber (6–2)	Quijada (0–1)	Phelps (1)	36,568	27–20	5½
48	May 31	White Sox	6–5	Gausman (5–3)	Giolito (3–2)	Romano (16)	25,424	28–20	5½

June: 15–13 (Home: 9–7; Road: 6–6)

#	Date	Opponent	Score	Win	Loss	Save	Attendance	Record	GB
49	June 1	White Sox	7–3	Stripling (1–1)	Kopech (1–2)	—	23,312	29–20	5
50	June 2	White Sox	8–3	Manoah (6–1)	Cueto (0–2)	—	25,250	30–20	5½
51	June 3	Twins	3–9	Cotton (1–1)	Kikuchi (2–2)	—	27,753	30–21	6½
52	June 4	Twins	12–3	Berríos (4–2)	Bundy (3–3)	—	36,987	31–21	6½
53	June 5	Twins	6–8	Cotton (2–1)	Gausman (5–4)	Morán (1)	34,088	31–22	7½
54	June 6	@ Royals	8–0	Stripling (2–1)	Lynch (2–5)	—	10,889	32–22	7
55	June 7	@ Royals	7–0	Manoah (7–1)	Keller (1–7)	—	15,103	33–22	7
56	June 8	@ Royals	4–8	Singer (3–1)	Richards (2–1)	—	12,196	33–23	7
57	June 10	@ Tigers	10–1	Berríos (5–2)	Rodríguez (0–2)	—	26,226	34–23	7½
58	June 11	@ Tigers	1–3	Brieske (1–5)	Gausman (5–5)	Soto (13)	30,738	34–24	8½
59	June 12	@ Tigers	6–0	Stripling (3–1)	Skubal (5–3)	—	29,399	35–24	8½
60	June 13	Orioles	11–1	Manoah (8–1)	Bradish (1–4)	—	19,716	36–24	8
61	June 14	Orioles	5–6	Lyles (4–5)	Kikuchi (2–3)	López (9)	23,106	36–25	9
62	June 15	Orioles	7–6 (10)	Cimber (7–2)	Bautista (2–2)	—	19,961	37–25	9
63	June 16	Orioles	2–10	Wells (4–4)	Gausman (5–6)	—	36,832	37–26	10
64	June 17	Yankees	3–12	Montgomery (3–1)	Stripling (3–2)	—	44,688	37–27	11
65	June 18	Yankees	0–4	Taillon (8–1)	Manoah (8–2)	—	45,055	37–28	12
66	June 19	Yankees	10–9	García (1–3)	Peralta (1–1)	Romano (17)	44,395	38–28	11
67	June 20	@ White Sox	7–8	Lynn (1–0)	Berríos (5–3)	Kelly (1)	22,842	38–29	12
68	June 21	@ White Sox	6–7 (12)	Velasquez (3–3)	Gage (0–1)	—	20,529	38–30	12
69	June 22	@ White Sox	9–5	Stripling (4–2)	Giolito (4–4)	—	19,406	39–30	12
70	June 24	@ Brewers	9–4	Manoah (9–2)	Houser (4–8)	—	32,166	40–30	11½
71	June 25	@ Brewers	4–5	Burnes (6–4)	Kikuchi (2–4)	Hader (22)	34,768	40–31	11½
72	June 26	@ Brewers	3–10	Gustave (1–0)	Berríos (5–4)	—	35,503	40–32	12½
73	June 27	Red Sox	7–2	Gausman (6–6)	Seabold (0–1)	—	25,498	41–32	12½
74	June 28	Red Sox	6–5	Romano (2–2)	Danish (2–1)	—	27,140	42–32	12½
75	June 29	Red Sox	5–6 (10)	Strahm (3–2)	Phelps (0–2)	—	27,601	42–33	13½
76	June 30	Rays	4–1	Kikuchi (3–4)	Yarbrough (0–4)	Cimber (4)	22,987	43–33	12½

July: 14–12 (Home: 10–6; Road: 4–6)

#	Date	Opponent	Score	Win	Loss	Save	Attendance	Record	GB
77	July 1	Rays	9–2	Berríos (6–4)	Kluber (3–5)	—	44,445	44–33	12
78	July 2 (1)	Rays	2–6	McClanahan (9–3)	Lawrence (0–1)	—	39,426	44–34	13
79	July 2 (2)	Rays	5–11	Garza Jr. (2–2)	Hatch (0–1)	—	24,180	44–35	14
80	July 3	Rays	3–7	Baz (1–1)	Stripling (4–3)	Adam (3)	35,757	44–36	14
81	July 4	@ Athletics	1–5	Irvin (3–6)	Manoah (9–3)	—	24,403	44–37	14½
82	July 5	@ Athletics	3–5	Martínez (2–1)	Kikuchi (3–5)	Trivino (6)	4,846	44–38	14½
83	July 6	@ Athletics	2–1	Cimber (8–2)	Acevedo (1–2)	Romano (18)	6,330	45–38	14½
84	July 7	@ Mariners	3–8	Gonzales (5–9)	Banda (1–1)	—	24,998	45–39	15½
85	July 8	@ Mariners	2–5 (11)	Borucki (1–0)	Romo (0–1)	—	32,398	45–40	16½
86	July 9	@ Mariners	1–2	Brash (2–3)	Manoah (9–4)	Castillo (5)	41,210	45–41	16½
87	July 10	@ Mariners	5–6	Festa (1–0)	Cimber (8–3)	Sewald (10)	37,694	45–42	16½
88	July 12	Phillies	4–3	Berríos (7–4)	Familia (1–1)	Romano (19)	32,795	46–42	15½
89	July 13	Phillies	8–2	Stripling (5–3)	Wheeler (8–5)	—	30,853	47–42	15½
90	July 14	Royals	1–3	Zerpa (2–0)	Gausman (6–7)	Barlow (16)	24,426	47–43	15½
91	July 15	Royals	8–1	Manoah (10–4)	Greinke (3–6)	—	26,422	48–43	14½
92	July 16	Royals	6–5 (10)	Romano (3–2)	Payamps (2–3)	—	40,135	49–43	14½
93	July 17	Royals	4–2	Mayza (3–0)	Mills (0–1)	Romano (20)	36,681	50–43	14½
	July 19	92nd All-Star Game in Los Angeles, California							
94	July 22	@ Red Sox	28–5	Gausman (7–7)	Eovaldi (4–3)	—	36,796	51–43	13½
95	July 23	@ Red Sox	4–1	Manoah (11–4)	Crawford (2–3)	Romano (21)	35,821	52–43	12½
96	July 24	@ Red Sox	8–4	Mayza (4–0)	Bello (0–2)	—	34,404	53–43	12½
97	July 26	Cardinals	10–3	Mayza (5–0)	Hicks (2–5)	—	39,756	54–43	11½
98	July 27	Cardinals	1–6	Wainwright (7–8)	Gausman (7–8)	—	36,666	54–44	11½
99	July 28	Tigers	5–3	Kikuchi (4–5)	Alexander (2–4)	Romano (22)	27,080	55–44	11½
100	July 29	Tigers	2–4	Vest (3–2)	Manoah (11–5)	Soto (19)	28,046	55–45	12½
101	July 30	Tigers	5–3	Richards (3–1)	Law (0–1)	Romano (23)	42,933	56–45	12½
102	July 31	Tigers	4–1	Berríos (8–4)	Hill (1–3)	Romano (24)	40,298	57–45	11½

August: 13–14 (Home: 4–8; Road: 9–6)

#	Date	Opponent	Score	Win	Loss	Save	Attendance	Record	GB
103	August 2	@ Rays	3–1	Gausman (8–8)	Rasmussen (6–4)	Romano (25)	16,433	58–45	11
104	August 3	@ Rays	2–3	Thompson (3–2)	Cimber (8–4)	Adam (5)	14,253	58–46	11
105	August 4	@ Twins	9–3	Manoah (12–5)	Pagán (3–5)	—	39,030	59–46	10½
106	August 5	@ Twins	5–6 (10)	Fulmer (4–4)	Romano (3–3)	—	29,593	59–47	10½
107	August 6	@ Twins	3–7	Megill (3–1)	White (1–3)	—	27,471	59–48	10½
108	August 7	@ Twins	3–2 (10)	Romano (4–3)	Thielbar (2–1)	—	26,155	60–48	9½
109	August 8	@ Orioles	4–7	Lyles (9–8)	Kikuchi (4–6)	Bautista (5)	12,671	60–49	10½
110	August 9	@ Orioles	5–6	Vespi (4–0)	García (1–4)	Bautista (6)	11,080	60–50	10½
—	August 10	@ Orioles	Postponed (rain); Makeup: September 5						
111	August 12	Guardians	0–8	Quantrill (9–5)	Berríos (8–5)	—	41,677	60–51	10
112	August 13	Guardians	2–1	Bass (3–3)	McKenzie (8–9)	Romano (26)	44,977	61–51	10
113	August 14	Guardians	2–7	Bieber (8–6)	Gausman (8–9)	—	41,002	61–52	10
114	August 15	Orioles	3–7	Baker (4–3)	Kikuchi (4–7)	—	26,769	61–53	10
115	August 16	Orioles	2–4	Kremer (5–4)	Manoah (12–6)	Bautista (7)	37,940	61–54	10
116	August 17	Orioles	6–1	García (2–4)	Krehbiel (4–4)	—	40,141	62–54	10
117	August 18	@ Yankees	9–2	Berríos (9–5)	Montas (4–10)	—	41,419	63–54	9
118	August 19	@ Yankees	4–0	Gausman (9–9)	Taillon (11–4)	—	46,194	64–54	8
119	August 20	@ Yankees	5–2	Cimber (9–4)	Cole (9–6)	García (1)	45,538	65–54	7
120	August 21	@ Yankees	2–4	Trivino (2–7)	Cimber (9–5)	—	46,958	65–55	8
121	August 23	@ Red Sox	9–3	Stripling (6–3)	Winckowski (5–7)	—	30,963	66–55	8½
122	August 24	@ Red Sox	3–2 (10)	Cimber (10–5)	Brasier (0–3)	Romano (27)	31,840	67–55	8
123	August 25	@ Red Sox	6–5 (10)	Romano (5–3)	Schreiber (3–3)	—	30,527	68–55	8
124	August 26	Angels	0–12	Detmers (5–4)	White (1–4)	—	40,754	68–56	9
125	August 27	Angels	0–2	Ohtani (11–8)	Manoah (12–7)	Herget (3)	45,311	68–57	9
126	August 28	Angels	3–8	Wantz (2–0)	Stripling (6–4)	—	44,318	68–58	9
127	August 29	Cubs	5–4 (11)	García (3–4)	Leiter Jr. (2–6)	—	26,473	69–58	8
128	August 30	Cubs	5–3	Gausman (10–9)	Little (0–1)	Romano (28)	33,759	70–58	8
129	August 31	Cubs	5–7	Rodríguez (1–0)	White (1–5)	Wick (9)	28,572	70–59	8

September: 18–10 (Home: 7–5; Road: 11–5)

#	Date	Opponent	Score	Win	Loss	Save	Attendance	Record	GB
130	September 2	@ Pirates	4–0	Manoah (13–7)	Beede (1–5)	—	18,057	71–59	7
131	September 3	@ Pirates	4–1	García (4–4)	Underwood Jr. (1–4)	Romano (29)	23,568	72–59	6
132	September 4	@ Pirates	4–3	Stripling (7–4)	Underwood Jr. (1–5)	Romano (30)	14,903	73–59	6
133	September 5 (1)	@ Orioles	7–3	Gausman (11–9)	Baumann (1–3)	—	see 2nd game	74–59	6
134	September 5 (2)	@ Orioles	8–4	Berríos (10–5)	Akin (3–2)	—	25,451	75–59	5½
135	September 6	@ Orioles	6–9	Tate (4–3)	White (1–6)	Bautista (12)	8,411	75–60	6
136	September 7	@ Orioles	4–1	Manoah (14–7)	Kremer (6–5)	Romano (31)	11,488	76–60	6½
137	September 9	@ Rangers	4–3	Mayza (6–0)	Leclerc (0–2)	Romano (32)	21,329	77–60	5
138	September 10	@ Rangers	11–7	Gausman (12–9)	Arihara (1–3)	Mayza (1)	28,340	78–60	5
139	September 11	@ Rangers	1–4	Pérez (11–6)	Richards (3–2)	Leclerc (4)	20,984	78–61	6
140	September 12	Rays	3–2	Mayza (7–0)	Adam (2–3)	Romano (33)	23,002	79–61	5½
141	September 13 (1)	Rays	2–4	Springs (8–4)	Merryweather (0–3)	Fairbanks (7)	23,497	79–62	6½
142	September 13 (2)	Rays	7–2	Bass (4–3)	Poche (4–2)	—	25,103	80–62	6
143	September 14	Rays	5–1	Stripling (8–4)	Rasmussen (10–5)	—	24,282	81–62	6
144	September 15	Rays	0–11	McClanahan (12–5)	Gausman (12–10)	—	23,820	81–63	6½
145	September 16	Orioles	6–3	Kikuchi (5–7)	Lyles (10–11)	—	36,573	82–63	5½
146	September 17	Orioles	6–3	Berríos (11–5)	Bradish (3–7)	Romano (34)	44,448	83–63	4½
147	September 18	Orioles	4–5	Krehbiel (5–4)	Romano (5–4)	Bautista (14)	41,301	83–64	5½
148	September 20	@ Phillies	18–11	Pop (3–0)	Gibson (10–7)	—	21,129	84–64	5½
149	September 21	@ Phillies	3–4 (10)	Bellatti (4–3)	Cimber (10–6)	—	29,363	84–65	6½
150	September 22	@ Rays	5–10	Yarbrough (3–8)	Berríos (11–6)	—	8,799	84–66	7½
151	September 23	@ Rays	6–10	Guerra (1–0)	García (4–5)	—	17,407	84–67	8½
152	September 24	@ Rays	3–1	Manoah (15–7)	Rasmussen (10–7)	Romano (35)	22,169	85–67	8½
153	September 25	@ Rays	7–1	Stripling (9–4)	McClanahan (12–7)	—	16,394	86–67	8½
154	September 26	Yankees	3–2 (10)	Mayza (8–0)	Schmidt (5–5)	—	34,307	87–67	7½
155	September 27	Yankees	2–5	Taillon (14–5)	Berríos (11–7)	Trivino (11)	40,528	87–68	8½
156	September 28	Yankees	3–8	Cole (13–7)	Mayza (8–1)	—	37,008	87–69	9½
157	September 30	Red Sox	9–0	Manoah (16–7)	Pivetta (10–12)	Kikuchi (1)	37,283	88–69	8½

October: 4–1 (Home: 2–0; Road: 2–1)

#	Date	Opponent	Score	Win	Loss	Save	Attendance	Record	GB
158	October 1	Red Sox	10–0	Stripling (10–4)	Bello (2–8)	—	44,612	89–69	8½
159	October 2	Red Sox	6–3	Pop (4–0)	Wacha (11–2)	Romano (36)	43,877	90–69	7½
160	October 3	@ Orioles	5–1 (8)	Berríos (12–7)	Kremer (8–7)	Mayza (2)	10,642	91–69	7½
—	October 4	@ Orioles	Postponed (rain); Makeup: October 5						
161	October 5 (1)	@ Orioles	4–5	Hall (1–1)	White (1–7)	Baker (1)	see 2nd game	91–70	8
162	October 5 (2)	@ Orioles	5–1	Kikuchi (6–7)	Canó (1–1)	—	17,248	92–70	7

== Postseason ==
=== American League Wild Card Series ===
As the wild card team with best record, the fourth-seeded Blue Jays won the right to host all games against the fifth-seeded Seattle Mariners in a best-of-three Wild Card series, where they were swept 2–0. It was the first Wild Card series for both franchises under the expanded format adopted this season.

The second game featured the third largest comeback in MLB playoff history, as the Mariners came back from being down 8–1 to win 10–9.

On the day preceding game one, Toronto mayor John Tory declared October 7 'Blue Jays Day', in a ceremony that included the raising of a team flag at Toronto City Hall.

=== Postseason game log ===
Legend
Blue Jays win	Blue Jays loss	Game postponed

2022 Postseason Game Log
American League Wild Card Series: 0–2

#	Date	Opponent	Score	Win	Loss	Save	Attendance	Series
1	October 7	Mariners	0–4	Castillo (1–0)	Manoah (0–1)	—	47,402	0–1
2	October 8	Mariners	9–10	Muñoz (1–0)	Romano (0–1)	Kirby (1)	47,156	0–2

=== Postseason rosters ===
Playoff rosters
American League Wild Card Series

- Pitchers: 6 Alek Manoah 16 Yusei Kikuchi 17 José Berríos 33 Trevor Richards 34 Kevin Gausman 35 David Phelps 48 Ross Stripling 52 Anthony Bass 56 Zach Pop 58 Tim Mayza 68 Jordan Romano 90 Adam Cimber 93 Yimi García
- Catchers: 9 Danny Jansen 30 Alejandro Kirk 55 Gabriel Moreno
- Infielders: 1 Whit Merrifield 5 Santiago Espinal 8 Cavan Biggio 11 Bo Bichette 26 Matt Chapman 27 Vladimir Guerrero Jr.
- Outfielders: 4 George Springer 15 Raimel Tapia 25 Jackie Bradley Jr. 37 Teoscar Hernández

== Statistics ==
(Updated as of October 6)

= Indicates team leader

= Indicates league leader

=== Batting ===
Note: G = Games played; AB = At bats; R = Runs scored; H = Hits; 2B = Doubles; 3B = Triples; HR = Home runs; RBI = Runs batted in; SB = Stolen bases; BB = Walks; AVG = Batting average; Ref. = Reference

Player	G	AB	R	H	2B	3B	HR	RBI	SB	BB	AVG	Ref.
Bo Bichette	159	652	91	189	43	1	24	93	13	41	.290	
Cavan Biggio	97	257	43	52	18	1	6	24	2	38	.202	
Jackie Bradley Jr.	40	73	9	13	4	0	1	9	0	7	.178	
Vinny Capra	8	5	2	1	0	0	0	0	0	2	.200	
Matt Chapman	155	538	83	123	27	1	27	76	2	68	.229	
Zack Collins	26	72	7	14	4	0	4	10	0	6	.194	
Santiago Espinal	135	449	51	120	25	0	7	51	6	36	.267	
Vladimir Guerrero Jr.	160	638	90	175	35	0	32	97	8	58	.274	
Lourdes Gurriel Jr.	121	453	52	132	32	1	5	52	3	31	.291	
Tyler Heineman	10	15	2	4	2	0	0	1	0	0	.267	
Teoscar Hernández	131	499	71	133	35	1	25	77	6	34	.267	
Danny Jansen	72	215	34	56	10	0	15	44	1	25	.260	
Gosuke Katoh	8	7	2	1	1	0	0	0	0	3	.143	
Alejandro Kirk	139	470	59	134	19	0	14	63	0	63	.285	
Otto Lopez	8	9	0	6	0	0	0	3	0	1	.667	
Whit Merrifield	44	121	19	34	5	0	5	16	1	8	.281	
Gabriel Moreno	25	69	10	22	1	0	1	7	0	4	.319	
George Springer	133	513	89	137	22	4	25	76	14	54	.267	
Raimel Tapia	128	411	47	109	20	3	7	52	8	16	.265	
Bradley Zimmer	100	89	14	9	4	0	2	5	3	5	.101	
Team totals	162	5555	775	1464	307	12	200	756	67	500	.264	

=== Pitching ===
Note: G = Games played; GS = Games started; W = Wins; L = Losses; SV = Saves; ERA = Earned run average; WHIP = Walks plus hits per inning pitched; IP = Innings pitched; H = Hits allowed; R = Runs allowed; ER = Earned runs allowed; BB = Walks allowed; K = Strikeouts; Ref. = Reference

Player	G	GS	W	L	SV	ERA	WHIP	IP	H	R	ER	BB	K	Ref.
Shaun Anderson	1	0	0	0	0	18.00	4.00	1	4	2	2	0	0	
Anthony Banda	7	1	0	1	0	4.26	1.58	6 1/3	7	3	3	3	7	
Anthony Bass	28	0	2	0	0	1.75	1.13	25 2/3	19	5	5	10	28	
Jeremy Beasley	9	0	0	0	0	4.80	1.27	15	14	9	8	5	19	
José Berríos	32	32	12	7	0	5.23	1.42	172	199	103	100	45	149	
Ryan Borucki	11	0	0	0	0	9.95	1.89	6 1/3	7	7	7	5	8	
Max Castillo	9	2	0	0	0	3.05	0.97	20 2/3	15	9	7	5	20	
Adam Cimber	77	0	10	6	4	2.80	1.12	70 2/3	66	28	22	13	58	
Bowden Francis	1	0	0	0	0	0.00	1.50	2/3	1	0	0	0	1	
Matt Gage	11	0	0	1	0	1.38	0.92	13	6	4	2	6	12	
Yimi García	61	0	4	5	1	3.10	1.05	61	48	26	21	16	58	
Kevin Gausman	31	31	12	10	0	3.35	1.24	174 2/3	188	72	65	28	205	
Foster Griffin	1	0	0	0	0	0.00	1.00	2	1	0	0	1	2	
Thomas Hatch	1	1	0	1	0	19.29	3.00	4 2/3	12	10	10	2	4	
Anthony Kay	1	0	0	0	0	4.50	1.50	2	2	1	1	1	3	
Yusei Kikuchi	32	20	6	7	1	5.19	1.50	100 2/3	93	67	58	58	124	
Casey Lawrence	6	0	0	1	0	7.50	1.50	18	23	15	15	4	11	
Alek Manoah	31	31	16	7	0	2.24	0.99	196 2/3	144	55	49	51	180	
Tim Mayza	63	0	8	1	2	3.14	1.11	48 2/3	42	19	17	12	44	
Whit Merrifield	1	0	0	0	0	18.00	2.00	1	2	2	2	0	0	
Julian Merryweather	26	1	0	3	0	6.75	1.43	26 2/3	31	20	20	7	23	
David Phelps	65	1	0	2	1	2.83	1.30	63 2/3	52	22	20	31	64	
Zach Pop	17	0	2	0	0	1.89	1.05	19	18	4	4	2	11	
Trevor Richards	62	4	3	2	0	5.34	1.44	64	57	41	38	35	82	
Jordan Romano	63	0	5	4	36	2.11	1.02	64	44	18	15	21	73	
Sergio Romo	6	0	0	1	0	4.91	0.82	3 2/3	1	3	2	2	3	
Hyun-jin Ryu	6	6	2	0	0	5.67	1.33	27	32	17	17	4	16	
Tayler Saucedo	4	0	0	0	0	13.50	2.63	2 2/3	6	4	4	1	0	
Ross Stripling	32	24	10	4	1	3.01	1.02	134 1/3	117	49	45	20	111	
Trent Thornton	32	0	0	2	0	4.11	1.24	46	40	21	21	17	37	
Andrew Vasquez	9	0	0	0	0	8.10	1.35	6 2/3	6	6	6	3	6	
Mitch White	10	8	0	5	0	7.74	1.74	43	59	37	37	16	31	
Team totals	162	162	92	70	46	3.87	1.24	1441 1/3	1356	679	620	424	1390	

== Transactions ==
=== April ===
- On April 7, selected the contract of Gosuke Katoh, and recalled Zack Collins.
- On April 8, traded Anthony Castro to the Cleveland Guardians for Bradley Zimmer.
- On April 10, activated Bradley Zimmer, and optioned Gosuke Katoh to Triple-A Buffalo.
- On April 11, optioned Tayler Saucedo to Triple-A Buffalo, designated Josh Palacios for assignment, placed Danny Jansen on the 10-day injured list, recalled Anthony Kay, and selected the contract of Tyler Heineman.
- On April 14, placed Teoscar Hernández on the 10-day injured list and recalled Gosuke Katoh.
- On April 17, placed Hyun-jin Ryu on the 10-day injured list and activated Ryan Borucki.
- On April 21, optioned Anthony Kay, and recalled Tayler Saucedo.
- On April 25, placed Cavan Biggio on the 10-day injured list and recalled Bowden Francis.
- On April 27, placed Ryan Borucki on the 10-day injured list and recalled Andrew Vasquez.
- On April 29, optioned Bowden Francis to Triple-A Buffalo and selected the contract of Vinny Capra.
- On April 30, placed Tayler Saucedo on the 10-day injured list and recalled Bowden Francis.

=== May ===
- On May 2, optioned Bowden Francis and Gosuke Katoh.
- On May 3, sent Teoscar Hernández on a rehab assignment to the Single-A Dunedin Blue Jays.
- On May 4, optioned Andrew Vasquez, designated Gosuke Katoh for assignment, and selected the contract of Casey Lawrence.
- On May 5, sent Hyun-jin Ryu on rehab assignment.
- On May 7, optioned Julian Merryweather to Triple-A Buffalo and activated Ryan Borucki and Teoscar Hernández.
- On May 8, optioned Casey Lawrence to Triple-A Buffalo.
- On May 10, sent Cavan Biggio on rehab assignment to the Triple-A Buffalo Bisons and Danny Jansen on rehab assignment to the Single-A Dunedin Blue Jays.
- On May 14, optioned Tyler Heineman and Trent Thornton to Triple-A Buffalo, and activated Danny Jansen and Hyun-jin Ryu.
- On May 16, optioned Cavan Biggio to Triple-A Buffalo, recalled Andrew Vasquez, and placed Tim Mayza on 15-day injured list.
- On May 23, optioned Zack Collins to Triple-A Buffalo and recalled Julian Merryweather.
- On May 26, optioned Vinny Capra to Triple-A Buffalo, recalled Cavan Biggio, and sent Nate Pearson on a rehab assignment to the Single-A Dunedin Blue Jays.
- On May 31, designated Ryan Borucki for assignment, and recalled Trent Thornton.

=== June ===
- On June 1, sent Nate Pearson on a rehab assignment to the Triple-A Buffalo Bisons.
- On June 2, placed Hyun-jin Ryu on the 15-day injured list and selected the contract of Jeremy Beasley.
- On June 4, traded Ryan Borucki to the Seattle Mariners for Tyler Keenan.
- On June 6, optioned Jeremy Beasley, transferred Nate Pearson to the 60-day injured list, and selected the contract of Matt Gage.
- On June 7, placed Danny Jansen on the 10-day injured list and recalled Zack Collins.
- On June 8, sent Tim Mayza on a rehab assignment to the Triple-A Buffalo Bisons.
- On June 10, placed Andrew Vasquez on the 15-day injured list and recalled Jeremy Beasley.
- On June 11, optioned Zack Collins and Jeremy Beasley, recalled Gabriel Moreno, and activated Tim Mayza.
- On June 14, recalled Jeremy Beasley, sent Tayler Saucedo on a rehab assignment to the FCL Blue Jays, placed Julian Merryweather on the 15-day injured list and signed free agent Andrew Moore to a minor league contract.
- On June 17, optioned Matt Gage, recalled Casey Lawrence and Otto Lopez.
- On June 18, outrighted Bowden Francis to the Triple-A Buffalo Bisons, recalled Matt Gage, placed Trevor Richards on the 15-day injured list and sent Tayler Saucedo on a rehab assignment to the Triple-A Buffalo Bisons.
- On June 19, selected the contract of Max Castillo
- On June 24, recalled Jeremy Beasley and placed Yimi Garcia on the 15-day injured list.
- On June 25, optioned Otto Lopez and recalled Zack Collins.
- On June 27, optioned Jeremy Beasley, selected the contract of Shaun Anderson and transferred Hyun-jin Ryu from the 15-day injured list to the 60-day injured list.
- On June 29, optioned Shaun Anderson, placed Tayler Saucedo on the 60-day injured list, signed and activated free agent Sergio Romo.
- On June 30, sent Trevor Richards on a rehab assignment to the Triple-A Buffalo Bisons.

=== July ===
- On July 2, acquired Anthony Banda from Pittsburgh for cash, recalled Casey Lawrence and Thomas Hatch and transferred Julian Merryweather from the 15-day injured list to the 60-day injured list.
- On July 3, optioned Thomas Hatch, Max Castillo and Casey Lawrence and activated Trevor Richards.
- On July 4, optioned Matt Gage, activated Anthony Banda, sent Danny Jansen and Yimi Garcia on a rehab assignment to the Triple-A Buffalo Bisons.
- On July 5, traded Leonel Callez to Atlanta.
- On July 6, claimed Matt Peacock off waivers from Kansas City, optioned Trent Thornton, recalled Casey Lawrence and designated Shaun Anderson for assignment.
- On July 7, optioned Matt Peacock, recalled Max Castillo and placed Yusei Kikuchi on the 15-day injured list.
- On July 8, optioned Casey Lawrence and activated Yimi Garcia.
- On July 9, outrighted Shaun Anderson to the Triple-A Buffalo Bisons.
- On July 12, optioned Gabriel Moreno, activated Danny Jansen and signed free agent Colton Shaver to a minor league contract.
- On July 16, traded Jonatan Bernal to Kansas City for Foster Griffin; recalled Jeremy Beasley, optioned Foster Griffin and designated Sergio Romo for assignment.
- On July 19, outrighted Sergio Romo to the Triple-A Buffalo Bisons.
- On July 22, sent Yusei Kikuchi on a rehab assignment to the Triple-A Buffalo Bisons.
- On July 23, sent Andrew Vasquez on a rehab assignment to the Rookie FCL Blue Jays.
- On July 26, signed Michael Turconi, Brandon Barriera, Cade Doughty, T.J. Brock, Devereaux Harrison, Peyton Williams, Josh Kasevich, Ian Churchill, Bo Bonds, Ryan Jennings, Ryan Chasse, Dylan Rock, Nolan Perry, Alan Roden, Tucker Toman, Sammy Hernandez, Pat Gallagher, Mason Fluharty; and signed Vinny Nittoli, Alex Amalfi, Devonte Brown, and Ryan McCarty to minor league contracts.
- On July 27, sent Andrew Vasquez on a rehab assignment to the Triple-A Buffalo Bisons.
- On July 28, optioned Jeremy Beasley.
- On July 29, signed free agents Kelsey Ward and Jerry Huntzinger to minor league contracts.
- On July 30, optioned Max Castillo and recalled Trent Thornton.
- On July 31, placed Ross Stripling on the 15-day injured list.

=== August ===
- On August 2, acquired Whit Merrifield from the Kansa City Royals for Max Castillo and Samad Taylor; acquired Mitch White and Alex De Jesus from the Los Angeles Dodgers for Nick Frasso and LHP Moises Brito; acquired Zach Pop, Anthony Bass and Player To Be Named Later from Miami Marlins for Jordan Groshans; traded RHP Jeremy Beasley to Pittsburgh Pirates for cash; recalled Matt Gage; designated Anthony Banda for assignment; reassigned Mitch White and Whit Merrifield to the minor leagues; signed free agents Ramon Suarez and Felipe Bello to minor league contracts.
- On August 3, recalled Matt Peacock, and optioned Mitch White.
- On August 4, activated Zach Pop, Whit Merrifield, Anthony Bass; optioned Zack Collins, Matt Gage, and Matt Peacock; and signed free agent Kevin Miranda to a minor league contract.
- On August 5, outrighted Anthony Banda to the Triple-A Buffalo Bisons.
- On August 6, placed George Springer on the 10-day injured list; optioned Trent Thornton; recalled Otto Lopez and Mitch White from Buffalo Bisons; sent Julian Merryweather on a rehab assignment to the Rookie FCL Blue Jays; signed free agent Juanmi Vasquez to a minor league contract.
- On August 7, placed Tim Mayza on the 15-day injured list and recalled Trent Thornton.
- On August 9, sent Julian Merryweather on a rehab assignment to Single-A Dunedin Blue Jays; signed free agent CF Jackie Bradley Jr; designated RHP Matt Peacock for assignment; and optioned SS Otto Lopez.
- On August 11, sent Julian Merryweather on a rehab assignment to the Triple-A Buffalo Bisons.
- On August 12, sent Ross Stripling on a rehab assignment to the Triple-A Buffalo Bisons, signed free agent Lluveres Severino to a minor league contract, outrighted Matt Peacock to the Triple-A Buffalo Bisons.
- On August 15, designated Bradley Zimmer for assignment and activated George Springer from the 10-day injured list.
- On August 16, signed free agent Yoshi Tsutsugo to a minor league contract.
- On August 17, activated Ross Stripling from the 15-day injured list and optioned Trent Thornton to Buffalo Bisons.
- On August 20, sent Tim Mayza on a rehab assignment to the Triple-A Buffalo Bisons.
- On August 23, activated Tim Mayza from the 15-day injured list and optioned Zach Pop.
- On August 26, sent Tayler Saucedo on a rehab assignment to the Triple-A Buffalo Bisons.
- On August 29, claimed Bradley Zimmer off waivers from the Philadelphia Phillies.
- On August 31, traded Vinny Nittoli to Philadelphia Phillies for Karl Ellison.

=== September ===
- On September 1, recalled Casey Lawrence and activated Bradley Zimmer.
- On September 4, sent Nate Pearson on a rehab assignment to the Single-A Dunedin Blue Jays.
- On September 5, Toronto Blue Jays activated Julian Merryweather from the 60-day injured list, designated Zack Collins for assignment, optioned Casey Lawrence and recalled Zach Pop.
- On September 6, returned Zach Pop to Triple-A Buffalo Bisons.
- On September 7, placed Teoscar Hernandez on the paternity list; recalled Zach Pop and Gabriel Moreno; optioned Mitch White; and signed free agent Eric Stamets to a minor league contract.
- On September 8, sent Nate Pearson on a rehab assignment to the Triple-A Buffalo Bisons.
- On September 9, placed Lourdes Gurriel Jr. on the 10-day injured list and recalled Otto Lopez.
- On September 10, placed Teoscar Hernandez on the restricted list.
- On September 11, activated Teoscar Hernandez from the restricted list and optioned Otto Lopez.
- On September 13, recalled Mitch White.
- On September 14, optioned Mitch White.
- On September 21, optioned Julian Merryweather and recalled Foster Griffin.
- On September 22, placed Santiago Espinal on the 10-day injured list and recalled Otto Lopez.
- On September 23, optioned Foster Griffin and recalled Mitch White.

=== October ===
- On October 5, placed Vinny Capra on the 60-day injured list; activated Nate Pearson from the 60-day injured list optioned Nate Pearson; optioned Mitch White; recalled Trent Thornton, Vinny Capra and Casey Lawrence.

== Roster ==
2022 Toronto Blue Jays
Roster
Pitchers: 64 Shaun Anderson; 43 Anthony Banda; 52 Anthony Bass; 38 Jeremy Beasley; 17 José Berríos; 56 Ryan Borucki; 60 Max Castillo; 90 Adam Cimber; 59 Bowden Francis; 91 Matt Gage; 93 Yimi García; 34 Kevin Gausman; 60 Foster Griffin; 31 Thomas Hatch; 47 Anthony Kay; 16 Yusei Kikuchi; 62 Casey Lawrence; 6 Alek Manoah; 58 Tim Mayza; 67 Julian Merryweather; 35 David Phelps; 56 Zach Pop; 33 Trevor Richards; 68 Jordan Romano; 54 Sergio Romo; 99 Hyun-jin Ryu; 54 Tayler Saucedo; 48 Ross Stripling; 57 Trent Thornton; 50 Andrew Vasquez; 45 Mitch White	Catchers: 21 Zack Collins; 22,51 Tyler Heineman; 9 Danny Jansen; 30 Alejandro Kirk; 55 Gabriel Moreno; Infielders: 11,21 Bo Bichette; 8 Cavan Biggio; 26 Matt Chapman; 5 Santiago Espinal; 27 Vladimir Guerrero Jr.; 29 Gosuke Katoh; 51 Otto Lopez; 1 Whit Merrifield	Outfielders: 25 Jackie Bradley Jr.; 44 Vinny Capra; 13 Lourdes Gurriel Jr.; 37 Teoscar Hernández; 4 George Springer; 15 Raimel Tapia; 7 Bradley Zimmer	Manager: 25 Charlie Montoyo; 14 John Schneider; Coaches: 60 Alex Andreopoulos (bullpen catcher); 53 Mark Budzinski (first base); 10 Matt Buschmann (bullpen); 2 Casey Candaele (interim bench coach); 85 David Howell (pitching strategist); 19 Dave Hudgens (hitting strategist); 78 Luis Hurtado (bullpen catcher); 22 Gil Kim (field coordinator); 18 Guillermo Martínez (hitting); 23 Hunter Mense (assistant hitting); 20 Luis Rivera (third base); 14 John Schneider (bench); 40 Pete Walker (pitching); 86 Adam Yudelman (coach)

== Farm system ==
(Updated as of October 4)

Level	Team	League	Manager	Win–loss record	Division	Postseason	Ref.
Triple-A	Buffalo Bisons	International League	Casey Candaele; Jeff Ware	76–72	East Division	Did not qualify	
Double-A	New Hampshire Fisher Cats	Eastern League	Cesar Martin	31–38 (first half); 28–41 (second half)	Northeast Division	Did not qualify	
High-A	Vancouver Canadians	Northwest League	Brent Lavallee	30–33 (first half); 37–29 (second half)	—N/a	Qualified lost F 3–0	
Low-A	Dunedin Blue Jays	Florida State League	Donnie Murphy	28–38 (first half); 38–25 (second half)	West Division	Qualified won SF 2–1 lost F 2–0	
Rookie	FCL Blue Jays	Florida Complex League	Jose Mayorga	28–27	North Division	Did not qualify	
Rookie	DSL Blue Jays	Dominican Summer League	Andy Fermin	18–38	Baseball City	Did not qualify	
