= Casey Lawrence =

American baseball player (born 1987)

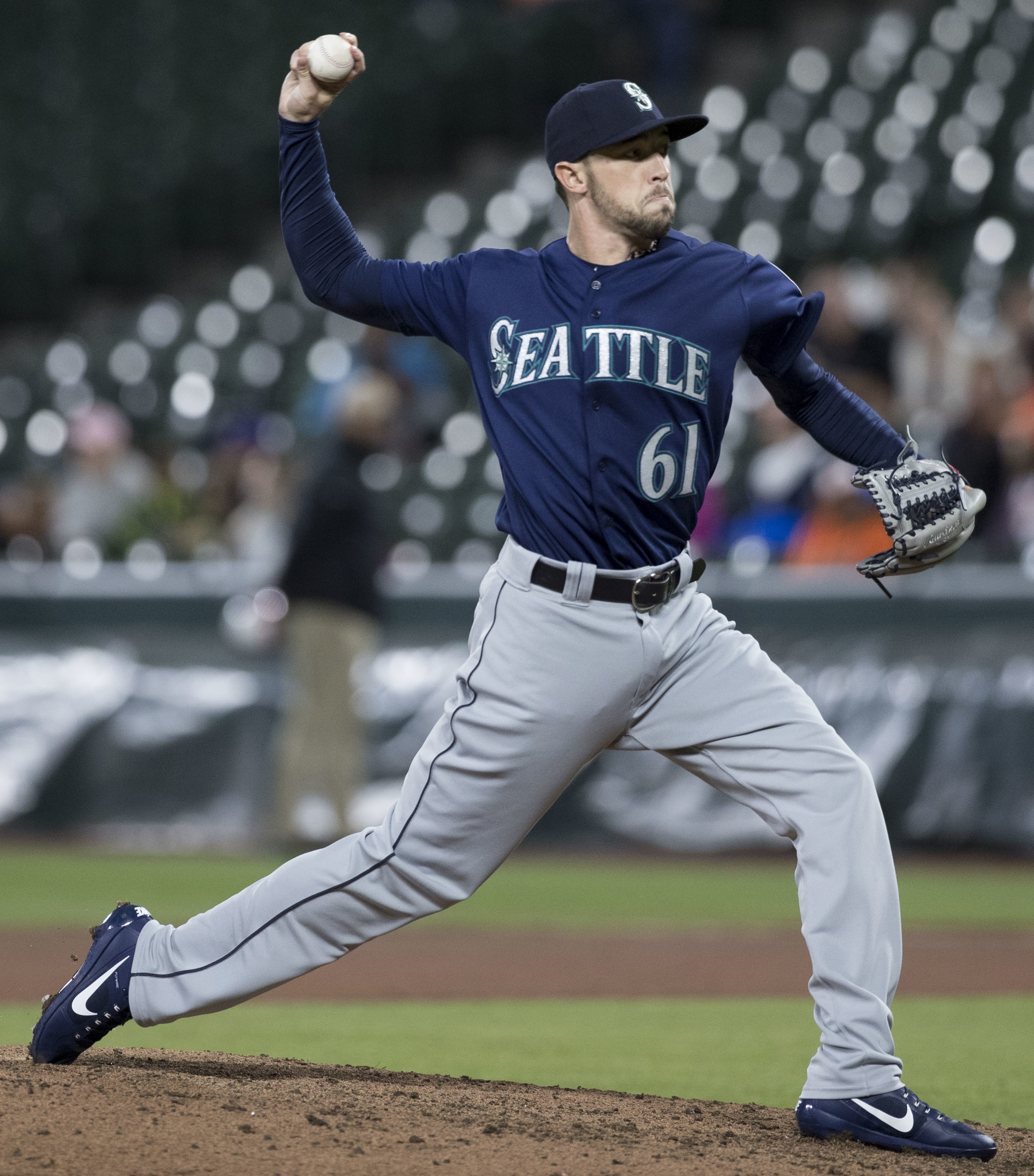
- Lawrence with the Seattle Mariners in 2017

Free agent
- Pitcher
- Born: October 28, 1987 (age 39); McSherrystown, Pennsylvania, U.S.
- Bats: Right Throws: Right

Professional debut
- MLB: April 8, 2017, for the Toronto Blue Jays
- NPB: July 3, 2019, for the Hiroshima Toyo Carp

MLB statistics (through 2025 season)
- Win–loss record: 5–6
- Earned run average: 6.42
- Strikeouts: 104

NPB statistics (through 2019 season)
- Win–loss record: 0–1
- Earned run average: 10.80
- Strikeouts: 3
- Stats at Baseball Reference

Teams
- Toronto Blue Jays (2017); Seattle Mariners (2017–2018); Hiroshima Toyo Carp (2019); Toronto Blue Jays (2022); St. Louis Cardinals (2023); Seattle Mariners (2025); Toronto Blue Jays (2025); Seattle Mariners (2025)
Medals
Men's baseball
Representing United States
WBSC Premier12
Bronze medal – third place	2024 Tokyo	Team

Casey Lee Lawrence (born October 28, 1987), nicknamed "Twig", is an American professional baseball pitcher who is a free agent. He has previously played in Major League Baseball (MLB) for the Toronto Blue Jays, Seattle Mariners, and St. Louis Cardinals, and in Nippon Professional Baseball (NPB) for the Hiroshima Toyo Carp.

== Amateur career ==
Lawrence attended Delone Catholic High School in his hometown of McSherrystown, Pennsylvania. Undrafted out of high school, he then went to Albright College, where he pitched and played first base. In four seasons for Albright, Lawrence pitched to an 18–8 win–loss record and 2.81 earned run average in 256 2/3 innings. He holds the all-time strikeout record for Albright, with 251. As a first baseman, he batted .256 with four home runs and 41 runs batted in.

== Professional career ==
=== Toronto Blue Jays ===
Lawrence was not selected in the 2010 Major League Baseball draft and signed with the Toronto Blue Jays as an undrafted free agent. In lieu of a signing bonus, Lawrence received a plane ticket to Dunedin, Florida. He was assigned to the Low-A Auburn Doubledays, where he was named a mid-season All-Star, and earned a promotion to the Single-A Lansing Lugnuts before the end of the season. In total, Lawrence went 7–2 in 2010, with a 2.33 ERA and 61 strikeouts in 77 1/3 innings. Lawrence pitched the majority of the 2011 season with Lansing, and was called up to the High-A Dunedin Blue Jays four separate times for brief stints. On July 1, he held a 5–8 record and 4.40 ERA with Lansing but managed to turn his season around, going 9–1 with a 1.93 ERA from that point onward. In his four starts for Dunedin in 2011, Lawrence went 3–1 with a 2.84 ERA and 14 strikeouts.

Lawrence opened 2012 with the Double-A New Hampshire Fisher Cats. After struggling in three appearances, he was assigned back to Dunedin, where he finished the season. In 151 1/3 total innings, he posted a 9–7 record, 3.87 ERA, and 96 strikeouts. Lawrence went to major league spring training with the Blue Jays as a non-roster invitee and was assigned to the Triple-A Buffalo Bisons on April 8. He was demoted to Dunedin the following day, and remained with Dunedin for most of the 2013 season, making two appearances for both New Hampshire in August. All told, Lawrence finished the year with a 4–7 record, 4.53 ERA, and 63 strikeouts in 103 1/3 innings. Lawrence pitched the entire 2014 season with New Hampshire, going 9–9 with a 3.69 ERA and 93 strikeouts in 151 1/3 innings pitched. In the offseason, he pitched for the Bravos de Margarita of the Venezuelan Winter League.

Lawrence participated in 2015 major league spring training and played mostly for New Hampshire that year, making one start for Buffalo in May. In August, he set the all-time wins record with New Hampshire after earning his 20th win as a Fisher Cat. In a career-high 167 2/3 innings, he went 12–14 with a 4.56 ERA and 97 strikeouts. Lawrence returned to the Bravos de Margarita in the offseason, pitching an additional 36 2/3 innings. In 2016, Lawrence pitched in Triple-A for the first significant amount of time in his career, as he split the year with the Bisons and Fisher Cats. In 28 starts, he had an 8–12 record, 4.17 ERA, and 108 strikeouts. Lawrence elected free agency following the season on November 7. He re-signed with the Blue Jays organization on November 14. For the third-consecutive offseason, Lawrence played winter ball with the Bravos de Margarita. He took part in major league spring training and was assigned to Triple-A in late March. On April 4, Lawrence was announced as the Opening Day starter for Buffalo. Due to two separate weather delays and his call-up to the majors, Lawrence did not make the start on Opening Day.

On April 8, 2017, the Blue Jays called up Lawrence. He made his MLB debut that night against the Tampa Bay Rays, taking the loss after walking in the winning run in the 11th inning. He was designated for assignment on May 8 after pitching 13 1/3 innings in the majors.

=== Seattle Mariners ===
On May 11, 2017, Lawrence was claimed off waivers by the Seattle Mariners. On June 1, he set a Mariners franchise record for most strikeouts in a single relief appearance when he struck out 9 batters over 5 innings against the Colorado Rockies. Lawrence earned his first major league win on August 1, pitching 2 1/3 innings of relief against the Texas Rangers in an 8–7 Mariners win. Between the two teams, for the season he was 2–3 with a 6.34 ERA. Left-handed batters had a higher batting average against him, .392, than all other MLB pitchers that threw at least 13 innings. He elected free agency on November 6 and signed a minor league contract with the Mariners on December 7.

Lawrence's contract was purchased by the Mariners on March 28, 2018, and he made the Mariners Opening Day roster. He was 1–0 with a 7.33 ERA in 11 games with Seattle in 2018. He was released on November 29, 2018, to pitch for a team in Japan.

=== Hiroshima Toyo Carp ===
In December 2018, Lawrence signed with the Hiroshima Toyo Carp of Nippon Professional Baseball (NPB). He pitched in just one game for the Carp in 2019, allowing 6 runs in 5 innings. He also pitched in 21 games for the Carp's minor league team in the Western League. On December 2, 2019, Lawrence became a free agent.

=== Minnesota Twins ===
On January 28, 2020, Lawrence signed a minor league deal with the Minnesota Twins but was released before the season began. On August 10, Lawrence re-signed with the Twins on a new minor league contract. He was assigned to the team's alternate training site in St. Paul but did not pitch in a game for the Twins organization in the shortened 2020 season. Lawrence became a free agent on November 2.

=== Toronto Blue Jays (second stint) ===
On March 30, 2021, Lawrence signed with the York Revolution of the Atlantic League of Professional Baseball. On May 19, prior to the start of the league's season, the Toronto Blue Jays purchased Lawrence's contract and assigned to the Triple-A Buffalo Bisons. On November 29, Lawrence signed a new minor league contract with the Blue Jays and was invited to spring training the following year.

Lawrence began the 2022 season with Buffalo. On May 4, the Blue Jays added Lawrence to the active roster. He replaced Gosuke Katoh. On November 9, Lawrence was removed from the 40-man roster and sent outright to Triple-A.

On January 3, 2023, Lawrence re-signed with Toronto on a minor league contract. In 18 starts for Triple-A Buffalo, he registered a 3–7 record and 4.67 ERA with 81 strikeouts in 90 2/3 innings pitched. On July 17, he exercised the opt-out clause in his contract and was released.

=== St. Louis Cardinals ===
On July 20, 2023, Lawrence signed a minor league contract with the St. Louis Cardinals. After 3 starts for the Triple-A Memphis Redbirds, on August 15, the Cardinals selected Lawrence's contract after they placed Steven Matz on the injured list. In 15 games for St. Louis, he had a 6.59 ERA with 20 strikeouts in 27 1/3 innings pitched. On October 26, Lawrence was removed from the 40-man roster and sent outright to Triple-A. However, Lawrence rejected the assignment and elected free agency.

=== Seattle Mariners (second stint) ===
On February 7, 2024, Lawrence signed a minor league contract with the Seattle Mariners that included an invitation to spring training. In 29 starts for the Triple-A Tacoma Rainiers, he logged an 11–11 record and 5.95 ERA with 108 strikeouts across 165 innings pitched. Lawrence elected free agency following the season on November 4. On November 15, Lawrence re-signed with the Mariners on a new minor league contract.

After two starts for Triple-A Tacoma to begin the 2025 season, the Mariners added Lawrence to their active roster on April 9. He made one appearance for Seattle before designating him for assignment on April 14. Lawrence elected free agency on April 16 but re-signed with Seattle on a new minor league contract the following day. On April 18, the Mariners selected Lawrence's contract, adding him back to their active roster. He appeared in two more games before being designated for assignment a second time on April 20. Lawrence cleared waivers on April 22 and was sent outright to Tacoma. The next day on April 23, his contract was selected by the Mariners. In his only appearance, Lawrence allowed 8 runs (2 earned) on 10 hits with 4 strikeouts over 5 innings pitched against the Miami Marlins. He was designated for assignment by Seattle on April 26.

=== Toronto Blue Jays (third stint) ===
On April 28, 2025, the Toronto Blue Jays claimed Lawrence off waivers. He made one appearance for the team, allowing three runs on six hits with one strikeout in 2 2/3 innings pitched against the Boston Red Sox on April 29. The next day, the Blue Jays designated Lawrence for assignment. He cleared waivers and elected free agency on May 2.

=== Seattle Mariners (third stint) ===
On May 7, 2025, Lawrence signed a minor league contract to return to the Seattle Mariners. On May 20, the Mariners added Lawrence to their active roster. That night, he threw five innings and allowed the lone run of the game, working in relief behind an opener against the Chicago White Sox. The next day, Seattle designated him for assignment, his fifth removal from an MLB roster in 2025. Lawrence cleared waivers and was sent outright to the Triple-A Tacoma Rainiers on May 23. He elected free agency the next day, however quickly re-signed with Seattle on another minor league contract that same day. On May 29, the Mariners selected Lawrence's contract, adding him back to their active roster. He did not make an appearance before being designated for assignment for a sixth time on the year on June 7. Lawrence cleared waivers and was sent outright to the minors on June 9. However, he rejected the assignment and elected free agency. In six games in the majors in 2025, one with Toronto, he went 1–2 with a 4 08 ERA in 17 2/3 innings.

Lawrence once again re-signed with Seattle on a new minor league contract the next day and returned to Triple-A. He threw a complete game two-hitter on July 24, the first 37-year-old to do so in Triple-A since Ramón Ortiz in 2010. Lawrence elected free agency following the season on November 6.

On November 27, 2025, Lawrence re-signed with the Mariners on a minor league contract. He made 23 starts for Triple–A Tacoma, compiling a 6–7 record and 4.37 ERA with 79 strikeouts across 131 2/3 innings pitched. Lawrence was released by Seattle after exercising the opt–out clause in his contract on August 10.

=== Philadelphia Phillies ===
On August 14, 2026, Lawrence signed a minor league contract with the Philadelphia Phillies. In 7 starts with Triple-A Lehigh Valley IronPigs he threw 30.2 innings going 1-1 with a 7.34 ERA and 22 strikeouts. He elected free agency on November 2.

== International career ==
Lawrence pitched for the U.S. national team in the 2024 WBSC Premier12 tournament. He won the USA Baseball International Performance of the Year Award for his six shutout innings in the bronze medal victory over Venezuela. In the tournament, he also allowed two runs in a win over the Netherlands.

== Personal life ==
Lawrence and his wife, Sarah, have two children and are expecting a third child in September 2025.

Lawrence played college basketball during his first year at Albright College before committing to baseball. He won a three-point shooting contest during the Mariners' 2024 spring training.
