= Alek Manoah =

American baseball player (born 1998)

Free agent
- Pitcher
- Born: January 9, 1998 (age 28); Homestead, Florida, U.S.
- Bats: Right Throws: Right

MLB debut
- May 27, 2021, for the Toronto Blue Jays

MLB statistics (through May 16, 2026)
- Win–loss record: 29–20
- Earned run average: 3.45
- Strikeouts: 417
- Stats at Baseball Reference

Teams
- Toronto Blue Jays (2021–2024); Los Angeles Angels (2026)

Career highlights and awards
- All-Star (2022); All-MLB First Team (2022)

Alek Isaac Manoah (born January 9, 1998) is an American professional baseball pitcher who is a free agent. He has previously played in Major League Baseball (MLB) for the Toronto Blue Jays and Los Angeles Angels. The Blue Jays selected Manoah with the 11th overall pick of the 2019 MLB draft out of West Virginia University. He made his MLB debut in 2021 and was an All-Star in 2022.

== Amateur career ==
Manoah attended South Dade High School in Homestead, Florida, and played for the school's baseball team. As a junior, he batted .492 with five home runs and 32 runs batted in. That summer, he played in the Under Armour All-America Baseball Game at Wrigley Field. During his senior year, he signed to play college baseball at West Virginia University. Manoah was not selected in the 2016 Major League Baseball draft out of high school and thus enrolled at West Virginia.

In 2017, as a freshman for the West Virginia Mountaineers, Manoah appeared in 19 games as a pitcher (ten starts), pitching to a 1–1 win–loss record with a 3.07 earned run average (ERA), earning a spot on the Big 12 Conference's All-Freshman Team. As a sophomore in 2018, Manoah went 3–5 with a 4.00 ERA in 23 games (eight starts). He particularly struggled with command, posting a 1.50 WHIP. That summer, he pitched in the Cape Cod Baseball League for the Chatham Anglers where he went 4–3 with a 3.57 ERA in nine starts. Prior to the 2019 season, Manoah was named a preseason All-American by Baseball America. During the season, Manoah was named to the Golden Spikes Award watchlist along with unanimously being named the Big 12 Pitcher of the Year. At the time he received the award, he was 8–3 with a 1.91 ERA in 14 starts, striking out 125 batters in 94 innings. He finished his junior year with a 9–4 record and a 2.08 ERA over 16 starts, compiling 144 strikeouts over 108 1/3 innings.

== Professional career ==
=== Toronto Blue Jays ===
==== Minor leagues ====
Manoah was considered one of the top prospects heading into the 2019 Major League Baseball draft. He was selected by the Toronto Blue Jays with the 11th overall pick. He signed for $4.55 million and made his professional debut with the Vancouver Canadians of the Low–A Northwest League on July 27. Over six starts, Manoah compiled a 2.65 ERA with 27 strikeouts over 17 innings. Manoah did not play a minor league game in 2020 due to the cancellation of the minor league season because of the COVID-19 pandemic.

To begin the 2021 season, Manoah was assigned to the Buffalo Bisons of the Triple-A East. In his first start of the season, he struck out 12 batters over six scoreless innings. Over three starts with Buffalo, Manoah went 3–0 with a 0.50 ERA and 27 strikeouts over 18 innings.

==== Major leagues ====
In May 2021, Manoah was selected to the 40-man roster and promoted to the major leagues. He made his major league debut on May 27 in a start against the New York Yankees, picking up the victory in a 2–0 Blue Jays' win. He recorded his first MLB strikeout in his debut against Yankees infielder Rougned Odor. Overall, Manoah totalled seven strikeouts while allowing two walks, no runs, and two hits over six innings. On June 22, he was suspended five games for an incident stemming from a June 19 game in which he was ejected for intentionally hitting Baltimore Orioles third baseman Maikel Franco with a pitch. On July 2, Manoah recorded seven consecutive strikeouts against the Tampa Bay Rays at Sahlen Field, setting a Blue Jays franchise record. Manoah finished his rookie season with the Blue Jays having started twenty games in which he went 9–2 with a 3.22 ERA and 127 strikeouts over 111 2/3 innings.

Manoah was selected to represent the Blue Jays alongside teammates Santiago Espinal, George Springer, Alejandro Kirk, and Vladimir Guerrero Jr. in the 2022 Major League Baseball All-Star Game. Manoah pitched one scoreless inning and struck out all three batters he faced. In 2022, Manoah went 16–7 with a 2.24 ERA in 196 2/3 innings while striking out 180 batters. He started the first game of the Wild Card Series against the Seattle Mariners, pitching 5 2/3 innings, giving up four hits and four earned runs with four strikeouts, as the Blue Jays were swept by the Mariners in the series. Manoah also finished third in Cy Young Award voting, behind Dylan Cease of the Chicago White Sox and winner Justin Verlander of the Houston Astros.

Coming off his first two major league seasons, expectations were high for Manoah, who was selected as Toronto's opening day starter. Instead, Manoah struggled early, posting a 6.36 ERA through his first 13 starts of the campaign. In one start against the Houston Astros on June 5, 2023, Manoah allowed six runs in the first inning and was removed from the game after recording only one out. The following day, Manoah was demoted to the Florida Complex League. His first start in the Florida Complex League on June 27 went poorly, as he allowed 11 earned runs on 10 hits in 2 2/3 innings of work.

On July 7, after a month in the minors, Manoah was recalled to the major league club. In his first start against the Detroit Tigers, he earned the win while recording 8 strikeouts, only giving up 1 earned run in 6 innings. He struggled in subsequent starts, walking several batters in his final five starts before being optioned to Triple–A Buffalo after an August 10 loss to the Cleveland Guardians. Manoah, however, reacted negatively to his demotion and did not report to the Bisons, and subsequently informed the Blue Jays that he would not pitch again during the 2023 season. American baseball journalist Buster Olney later opined, "Every year there are literally dozens of players who get sent down and don't agree with the decision, but they get on the bus, get on the plane, they go down, they report to go to work to prove the team wrong. This is a bad career move for Manoah."

Following the demotion to Buffalo, Manoah met with specialists who examined his knee, back and right quadricep, with no structural damage being found. While media speculated on whether Manoah's struggles were mental or physical in origin, Blue Jays' manager John Schneider simply described the situation as "frustrating", adding that Manoah "feels like he's not ready to compete so we're going to respect that and kind of move on from it." Manoah was officially shut down in September, having not thrown a pitch since his August 10th demotion. In Manoah's absence, the Blue Jays secured a playoff spot, playing the Minnesota Twins in the best-of-three AL Wild Card Series. At season's end, GM Ross Atkins reiterated that no structural damage had been found, but that Manoah had recently received "an injection" to relieve discomfort in his right shoulder, and that team doctors had no input in that decision. He said that Manoah "felt as though that was the next best step", and also noted that Manoah was not seeking a trade and was unlikely to work through his issues in winter ball.

On May 5, 2024, Manoah returned to the majors to pitch against the Washington Nationals. He pitched for 4 innings and surrendered 6 earned runs in an 11–8 loss. On May 19, in a 5-2 win over the Tampa Bay Rays, Manoah recorded his 400th career strikeout, becoming the second-fastest Blue Jay pitcher to accomplish this feat. On June 7, it was announced that Manoah would undergo season-ending surgery to repair the UCL of his throwing elbow.

On September 11, 2025, Manoah was activated from the 60-day injured list and optioned to Triple-A Buffalo. Despite a strong showing in Buffalo with a 2.97 earned run average over 7 games started, Manoah was designated for assignment on September 23.

=== Atlanta Braves ===
On September 26, 2025, the Atlanta Braves claimed Manoah off of waivers. With the 2025 season only a few days from ending, Manoah did not throw a pitch for the Braves or for any of their minor league affiliates. On November 21, he was non-tendered by Atlanta and became a free agent.

=== Los Angeles Angels ===
On December 2, 2025, Manoah signed a one-year, major league contract with the Los Angeles Angels. He opened the season on the injured list, due to a fingernail issue on his pitching hand. Manoah began a rehab assignment pitching for the Single–A Rancho Cucamonga Quakes affiliate in May.

After only one rehab start (in which he gave up seven hits, two walks and five earned runs in 4 1/3 innings), Manoah was activated from the injured list on May 6, 2026, and joined the Angels in their bullpen. He made his season debut on May 8, throwing one scoreless inning in relief against the Toronto Blue Jays in which he did not allow a baserunner and recorded one strikeout. This marked his first MLB appearance in 709 days. Manoah then pitched five scoreless innings with two strikeouts and five walks against the Cleveland Guardians on May 11. In his third appearance of the season, however, he allowed nine runs (eight earned -- the unearned run was the result of his own fielding error), six hits, and three walks across 1 1/3 innings against the Los Angeles Dodgers. He was subsequently optioned to the Triple-A Salt Lake Bees. On May 20, Manoah was removed from the 40-man roster and sent outright to Salt Lake.

In his first start at Salt Lake, Manoah lasted 2 1/3 innings, gave up three hits (including a home run), three walks, a balk, four runs (all earned, for an ERA of 15.43), and was tagged with the loss. He made a total of ten starts for Salt Lake and had a 1-7 record, a 16.14 ERA, and 42 walks across 30 2/3 innings. Manoah was released by the Angels organization on July 29.

== Pitching style ==
During the first years of his stint with the Toronto Blue Jays, Manoah featured an upper 90s mph fourseam fastball, a mid 90s sinker, a changeup, and a slider that he learned from watching Dellin Betances on Rob Friedman's Twitter account, PitchingNinja. When pitching with the Los Angeles Angels in 2026, his fastball was clocked at around 84 mph, a significant drop in velocity from his prime.

== Personal life ==
Manoah's older brother, Erik, was drafted by the New York Mets in the 13th round of the 2014 Major League Baseball draft. He pitched in the minor leagues for four different organizations: The Mets, the Angels, the Minnesota Twins, and the Washington Nationals. He topped out with a brief stint at Triple-A, and has not pitched in affiliated baseball since 2022.
