= Yusei Kikuchi =

Japanese baseball player (born 1991)

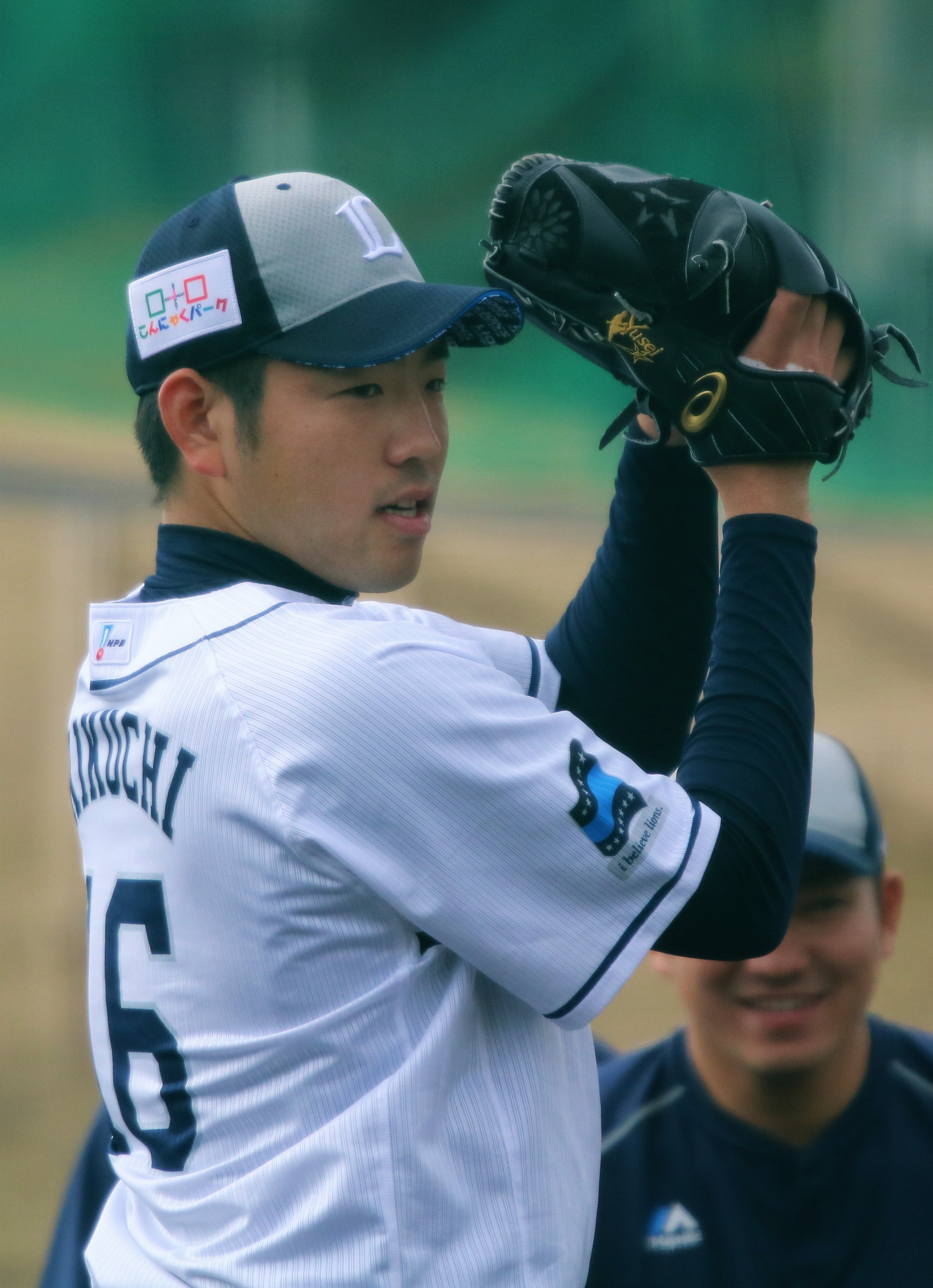
- Kikuchi with the Saitama Seibu Lions in 2018

Los Angeles Angels – No. 16
- Pitcher
- Born: June 17, 1991 (age 35); Morioka, Iwate, Japan
- Bats: Left Throws: Left

Professional debut
- NPB: June 12, 2011, for the Saitama Seibu Lions
- MLB: March 21, 2019, for the Seattle Mariners

NPB statistics (through 2018 season)
- Win–loss record: 73–46
- Earned run average: 2.77
- Strikeouts: 903

MLB statistics (through 2026 season)
- Win–loss record: 49–65
- Earned run average: 4.49
- Strikeouts: 1,078
- Stats at Baseball Reference

Teams
- Saitama Seibu Lions (2011–2018); Seattle Mariners (2019–2021); Toronto Blue Jays (2022–2024); Houston Astros (2024); Los Angeles Angels (2025–present)

Career highlights and awards
- NPB: 3× NPB All-Star (2013, 2017–2018); Pacific League ERA leader (2017); Pacific League wins leader (2017); Mitsui Golden Glove Award (2017); MLB: 2× All-Star (2021, 2025)

Yusei Kikuchi (菊池 雄星, Kikuchi Yūsei; Japanese pronunciation: [ki̥kɯtɕi jɯꜜːseː], born June 17, 1991) is a Japanese professional baseball pitcher for the Los Angeles Angels of Major League Baseball (MLB). He has previously played in MLB for the Seattle Mariners, Toronto Blue Jays, and Houston Astros, and in Nippon Professional Baseball (NPB) for the Saitama Seibu Lions. Kikuchi has been named an All-Star in 2021 and 2025.

== Amateur career ==
Kikuchi attended Hanamaki Higashi High School, the same high school that two-way player Shohei Ohtani would later attend. As a high school pitcher, Kikuchi had a fastball that was clocked at 154 km/h (96 mph) in 2009. In October 2009, Kikuchi sparked controversy when it was announced that he was considering bypassing the amateur draft in Japan for the NPB and signing with an American Major League Baseball club. Under Major League Baseball's rules, Kikuchi would not have been subject to the MLB Draft and instead be declared a free agent, free to sign with any American team he wanted. The Texas Rangers were one of several teams interested in signing Kikuchi, as well as the Boston Red Sox. Japanese news service reports also identified scouts from the Los Angeles Dodgers, Seattle Mariners, New York Mets, Cleveland Indians, Chicago Cubs, San Francisco Giants, Detroit Tigers, Atlanta Braves and New York Yankees watching Kikuchi in tournaments. All 12 NPB teams were also reportedly interested in signing him.

Hanamaki Higashi manager Hiroshi Sasaki submitted paperwork to the high school baseball federation in Iwate Prefecture on Kikuchi's behalf, stating his desire to turn pro. The move opened the way for professional teams to make contact with Kikuchi in a race to secure his services. With the submission of the paperwork, Kikuchi was open to be named in the Japanese baseball draft, which began on October 29, 2009. He was expected to be named as a No. 1 draft pick by several Japanese clubs. NPB had asked that Kikuchi not receive an offer from any major league clubs before Japan's draft, in order to even the chances for Japanese teams, who are not allowed to make offers before the draft. Kikuchi helped Hanamaki Higashi to a runner-up finish at the national high school invitational in April and to the semifinals in the national championship in August. Kikuchi had reportedly expressed a preference to play in the United States and even visited in October.

Kikuchi would have been the first Japanese high school player to bypass the domestic amateur draft to come to MLB. By staying, players lock themselves into nine seasons before they're eligible for free agency. They can leave only if their Japanese team allows them to enter the posting system in which MLB teams can bid for the right to negotiate with them. Furthermore, leaving for an American team bans players from Japanese leagues for three years. Kikuchi held talks with the Red Sox, Dodgers, Rangers, and Giants on Monday, October 19, and talks with the Yankees, Mets, and Mariners the following day. He decided to stay in Japan and enter the draft instead of playing in the United States.

== Professional career ==
=== Saitama Seibu Lions ===
On November 20, 2009, Kikuchi signed a pro deal with the Saitama Seibu Lions (the Saitama Seibu Lions are a professional baseball team in Japan's Pacific League based north of Tokyo); the deal included a 100 million yen (about $1 million) signing bonus, a 15 million yen ($150,000) first-year salary, and 50 million yen ($500,000) in performance bonuses.

After the 2011 season, Seibu announced that Kikuchi would join the Melbourne Aces of the Australian Baseball League (ABL).

In 2018, Kikuchi was selected to play in the NPB All-Star Game.

On December 3, 2018, Seibu announced it was allowing Kikuchi to enter the posting system to play in Major League Baseball (MLB), with the 30-day period starting a month later.

=== Seattle Mariners ===
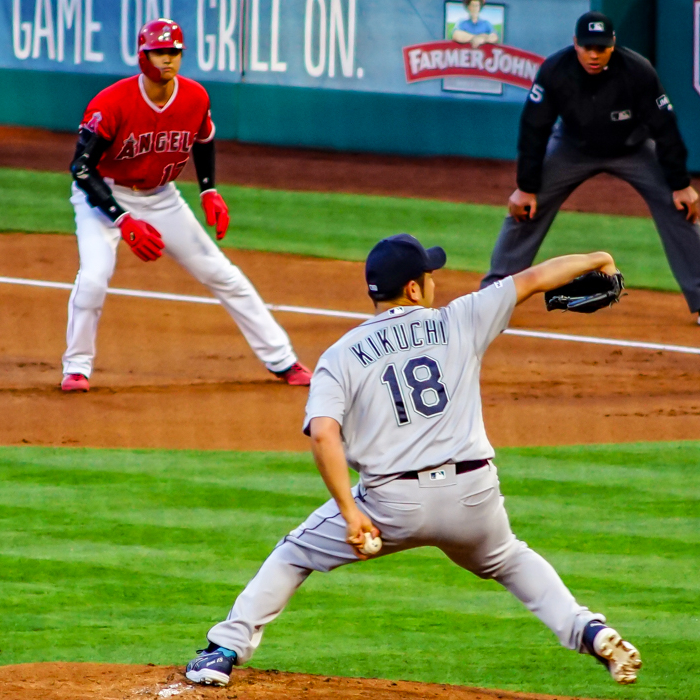
Kikuchi pitching for the Mariners with Shohei Ohtani on base

On January 2, 2019, Kikuchi signed a three-year, $53 million contract with the Seattle Mariners. Kikuchi made his MLB debut on March 21, 2019, going 4 2/3 innings while allowing two runs (one earned) and striking out three. He is the first Japanese-born player to make his MLB debut in Japan. Kikuchi struggled in his first season with Seattle, going 6–11 with an ERA of 5.46 in 32 starts. He struck out 116 in 161 2/3 innings. Kikuchi improved his performance in 2020, recording a 5.17 ERA and increasing his strikeout percentage from 16.1% to 24%.

Kikuchi was selected for the American League's (AL) roster in the 2021 Major League Baseball All-Star Game.

=== Toronto Blue Jays ===
On March 14, 2022, Kikuchi signed a three-year, $36 million contract with the Toronto Blue Jays. In 32 games (20 starts) for Toronto, he posted a 6–7 record and 5.19 ERA with 124 strikeouts across 100 2/3 innings pitched. On September 30, a day after clinching a post-season berth, Kikuchi earned his first MLB save.

Kikuchi made 32 starts for Toronto in 2023, compiling an 11–6 record and 3.86 ERA with 181 strikeouts across 167 2/3 innings pitched. He made 22 starts for the Blue Jays in 2024, posting a 4–9 record and 4.75 ERA with 130 strikeouts.

=== Houston Astros ===
On July 29, 2024, Kikuchi was traded to the Houston Astros in exchange for Jake Bloss, Joey Loperfido, and Will Wagner. On August 2, in his team debut against the Tampa Bay Rays, Kikuchi became the first Japanese-born starting pitcher in Astros franchise history. He also tied a franchise record with eight consecutive strikeouts, of which that streak ended on a full count walk to Yandy Díaz. (Note: Previously accomplished by Don Wilson (1968), Jim Deshaies (1986) and Justin Verlander (2022).) By tallying 11 total strikeouts, he had the most in an Astros debut since Gerrit Cole on April 1, 2018, and to that point, Kikuchi's total represented the season high for the staff. He exited after 5 2/3 innings and allowing three hits, two runs, and two walks in a contest the Astros held on to win, 3–2. On September 13, Kikuchi was the winning pitcher as the Astros collected the 5,000th win in franchise history by defeating the Los Angeles Angels, 5–3. The Astros won Kikuchi's first nine starts to set a franchise record, surpassing eight consecutive team wins to start their Astros careers shared by Roy Oswalt (2001) and teammate Justin Verlander (2018). It was the longest such streak in the major league since John Burkett with the 2002 Boston Red Sox.

During his time in Houston, Kikuchi logged 10 starts, 2.70 ERA, and 5–1 W-L over 60 IP. He surrendered 42 hits, 8 home runs, 14 BB, and struck out 76 batters for a 0.933 walks plus hits per inning pitched (WHIP), 11.4 strikeouts per nine innings pitched (K/9), and 5.43 strikeout-to-walk ratio (K/BB). Cumulative season totals between Toronto and Houston included 9–10 W–L and 4.05 ERA over 32 starts. He registered career-highs of 175 1/3 IP and 206 strikeouts, which ranked fifth in the AL. He ranked 7th in earned runs (79), and 10th in both hits (167) and home runs (25) allowed. He was also 3rd in the AL with 10.554 K/9, 6th with 4.682 K/BB, and 8th with 3.46 Fielding Independent Pitching (FIP). Following the season, he elected free agency.

=== Los Angeles Angels ===
On November 27, 2024, Kikuchi signed a three-year, $63 million contract with the Los Angeles Angels. On March 27, 2025, in his team debut against the Chicago White Sox on Opening Day, he pitched six innings, allowed five hits and three runs while striking out five batters in an 8-1 loss. On May 23, Kikuchi got his first win as an Angel against the Miami Marlins, where he pitched 5 2/3 innings, allowed seven hits, walked four batters and struck out four batters in a 7-4 Angels victory. On June 25, Kikuchi recorded a season-high 12 strikeouts against the Boston Red Sox where he pitched seven innings, while allowing three hits and walked just one batter in a 5-2 Angels victory. On July 6, Kikuchi was named to the 2025 MLB All-Star Game roster, his second career selection. On September 6, Kikuchi struck out Shea Langeliers in the first inning to become the fourth Japanese-born pitcher to record 1,000 career strikeouts in MLB history. He joined Yu Darvish (2,055), Hideo Nomo (1,918), and Kenta Maeda (1,055) as the only Japanese players to reach that mark in the Majors.

On May 3, 2026, Kikuchi was placed on the injured list due to left shoulder inflammation. He was transferred to the 60-day injured list on May 22. Kikuchi was activated from the injured list on August 23.

== Playing style ==
Kikuchi is a 6-foot (1.83 m), 210-pound (95 kg) left-handed pitcher throwing from a three-quarters arm angle. He features a four-seam fastball topping out at 99 miles per hour (159 km/h). He mainly throws an above-average slider in addition to the fastball and also mixes in a curve and changeup.

== Personal life ==
Kikuchi has been known to follow a strict pattern of sleep. Prior to every start, he reportedly sleeps between 13 and 14 hours.

Kikuchi married Rumi Fukatsu in 2016.

== See also ==
- List of Major League Baseball players from Japan
