= Raimel Tapia =

Dominican baseball player (born 1994)

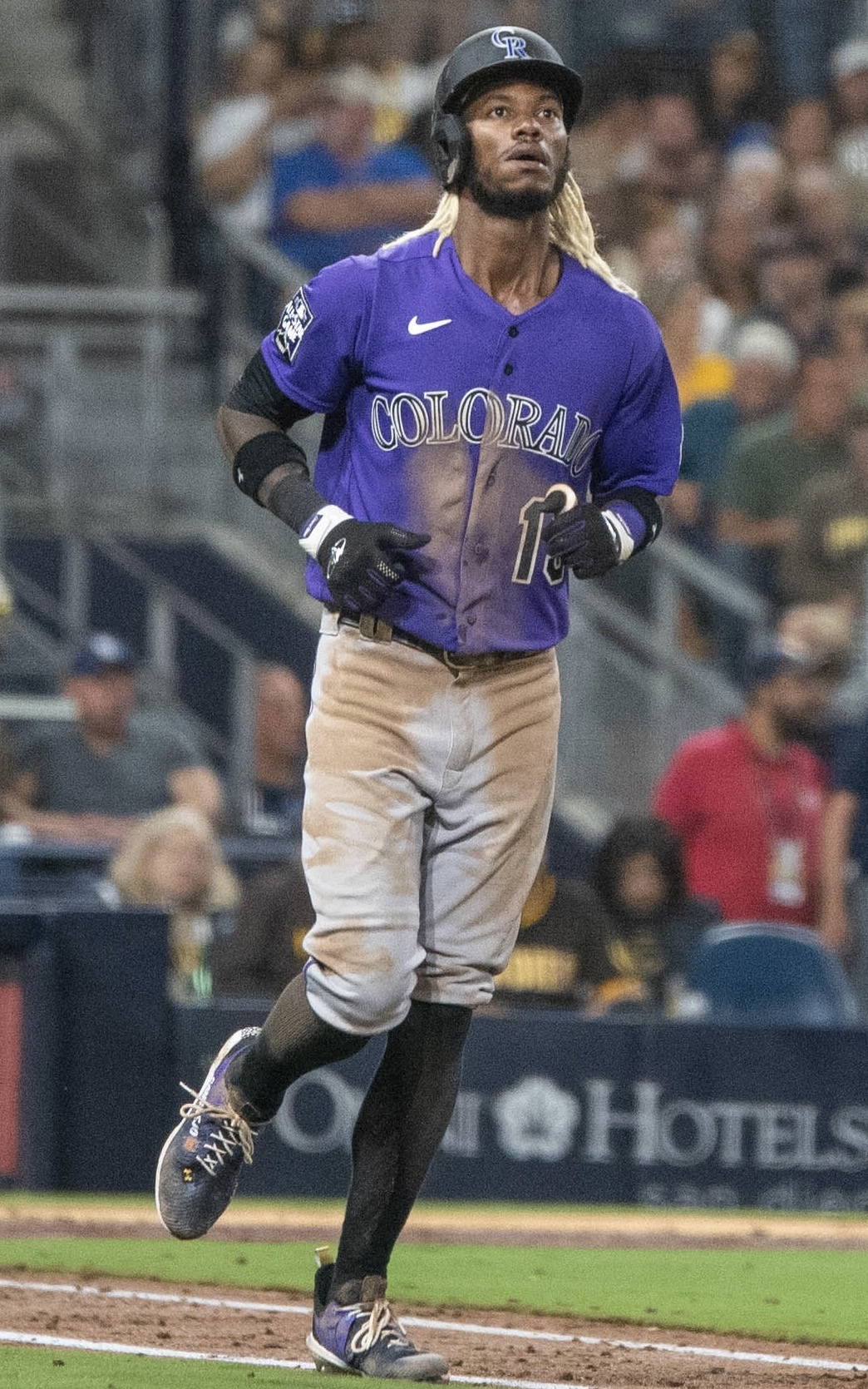
- Tapia with the Colorado Rockies in 2021

Free agent
- Outfielder
- Born: February 4, 1994 (age 32); San Pedro de Macorís, Dominican Republic
- Bats: Left Throws: Left

MLB debut
- September 2, 2016, for the Colorado Rockies

MLB statistics (through 2023 season)
- Batting average: .274
- Home runs: 29
- Runs batted in: 201
- Stats at Baseball Reference

Teams
- Colorado Rockies (2016–2021); Toronto Blue Jays (2022); Boston Red Sox (2023); Milwaukee Brewers (2023); Tampa Bay Rays (2023)

Raimel Antonio Tapia Linarez (born February 4, 1994) is a Dominican professional baseball outfielder who is a free agent. He has previously played in Major League Baseball (MLB) for the Colorado Rockies, Toronto Blue Jays, Boston Red Sox, Milwaukee Brewers, and Tampa Bay Rays.

== Career ==
=== Colorado Rockies ===
The Colorado Rockies signed Tapia as an international free agent in 2010. He spent the 2013 season with the Grand Junction Rockies of the Rookie-level Pioneer League, and was named the league's player of the month for July. He had a 29-game hitting streak for Grand Junction. After the season, he was named the Topps Pioneer League Player of the Year for 2013 and was named by Baseball Prospectus as the No. 97 prospect in all of baseball prior to the 2014 season. The Rockies added him to their 40-man roster after the 2015 season.

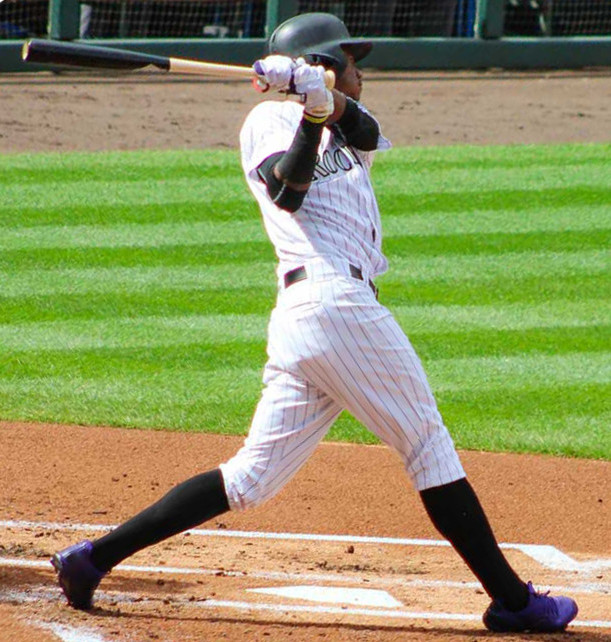
Tapia during an at-bat in 2017

Tapia began the 2016 season with the Hartford Yard Goats of the Double–A Eastern League, and was selected to appear in the 2016 All-Star Futures Game. The Rockies promoted him to the Albuquerque Isotopes of the Triple–A Pacific Coast League in August.

The Rockies promoted Tapia to the major leagues on September 2, 2016.

On July 20, 2018, Tapia hit a two out, two strike, go-ahead pinch hit grand slam in the top of the 7th inning against Arizona Diamondbacks reliever Archie Bradley to give the Rockies an 11–8 lead. It was the first grand slam of Tapia's career and would ultimately prove to be the difference as the Rockies would go on to win the game 11–10.

In 2018, in 25 at bats he hit .200/.259/.480. He had the fastest baserunning sprint speed of all major league designated hitters, at 28.6 feet/second.

Tapia received more playing time in 2020 after Ian Desmond opted out of the season because of the COVID-19 pandemic. In 51 games, Tapia hit .321, drove in 17 runs, and stole eight bases.

In 2021 he batted .273/.327/.372. He had the highest ground ball/fly ball ratio in the major leagues, at 4.10, the highest ground ball percentage, at 67.4%, and the lowest fly ball percentage, at 16.4%.

=== Toronto Blue Jays ===
On March 24, 2022, Tapia and Adrian Pinto were traded to the Toronto Blue Jays in exchange for Randal Grichuk.

On July 22, 2022, in the top of the 3rd inning, Tapia hit an inside the park grand slam at Fenway Park against the Boston Red Sox, the second in franchise history. The Blue Jays would go on to win the game 28–5, setting a franchise record for the most runs scored in a single game.

On November 15, 2022, Tapia was designated for assignment. He was non-tendered and became a free agent on November 18.

=== Boston Red Sox ===
On January 26, 2023, Tapia signed a minor-league contract with the Boston Red Sox and was named a non-roster invitee to spring training. An impressive spring training performance got him added to the major-league roster for the team's Opening Day game. However, a roster crunch and an logjam in Boston's outfield meant Tapia was the odd man out, and he was designated for assignment by the Red Sox after Christian Arroyo was activated from the injured list on June 5. Tapia was released by Boston on June 11. In 39 games for Boston, Tapia hit .264/.333/.368 with one home run, ten RBI, and nine stolen bases.

=== Milwaukee Brewers ===
On June 14, 2023, Tapia signed a major league contract with the Milwaukee Brewers. In 20 games for Milwaukee, he struggled to a .173/.267/.288 batting line with 2 home runs and 3 RBI. On July 22, Tapia was designated for assignment by the Brewers following the promotion of Sal Frelick. He elected free agency upon clearing waivers on July 24.

=== Tampa Bay Rays ===
On August 3, 2023, Tapia signed a minor league contract with the Tampa Bay Rays. In 29 games for the Triple–A Durham Bulls, he batted .269/.371/.414 with 4 home runs and 11 RBI. Tampa Bay selected his contract and added him to the active roster on September 23. In 5 games for the Rays, he went 3–for–9 (.333) with two stolen bases. Following the season on November 4, Tapia was removed from the 40–man roster and sent outright to Triple–A Durham. He elected free agency on November 6.

=== Sultanes de Monterrey ===
On April 15, 2025, Tapia signed with the Sultanes de Monterrey of the Mexican League. In 18 games, he hit .232/.302/.339 with one home run, eight RBI, and two stolen bases.

Tapia made 41 appearances for Monterrey in 2026, batting .254/.320/.299 with 12 RBI and three stolen bases. On June 15, 2026, Tapia was released by the Sultanes.

=== Bravos de León ===
On June 19, 2026, Tapia signed with the Bravos de León of the Mexican League. In six appearances for the Bravos, he went 5-for-24 (.250) with no home runs and two RBI. On June 26, Tapia was released by León.

== Scouting report ==
Tapia has been noted for altering his batting stance during at-bats. He generally stands at the plate with an upright stance except when there are two strikes against him, at which point he crouches deeply.
