= Tim Mayza =

American baseball player (born 1992)

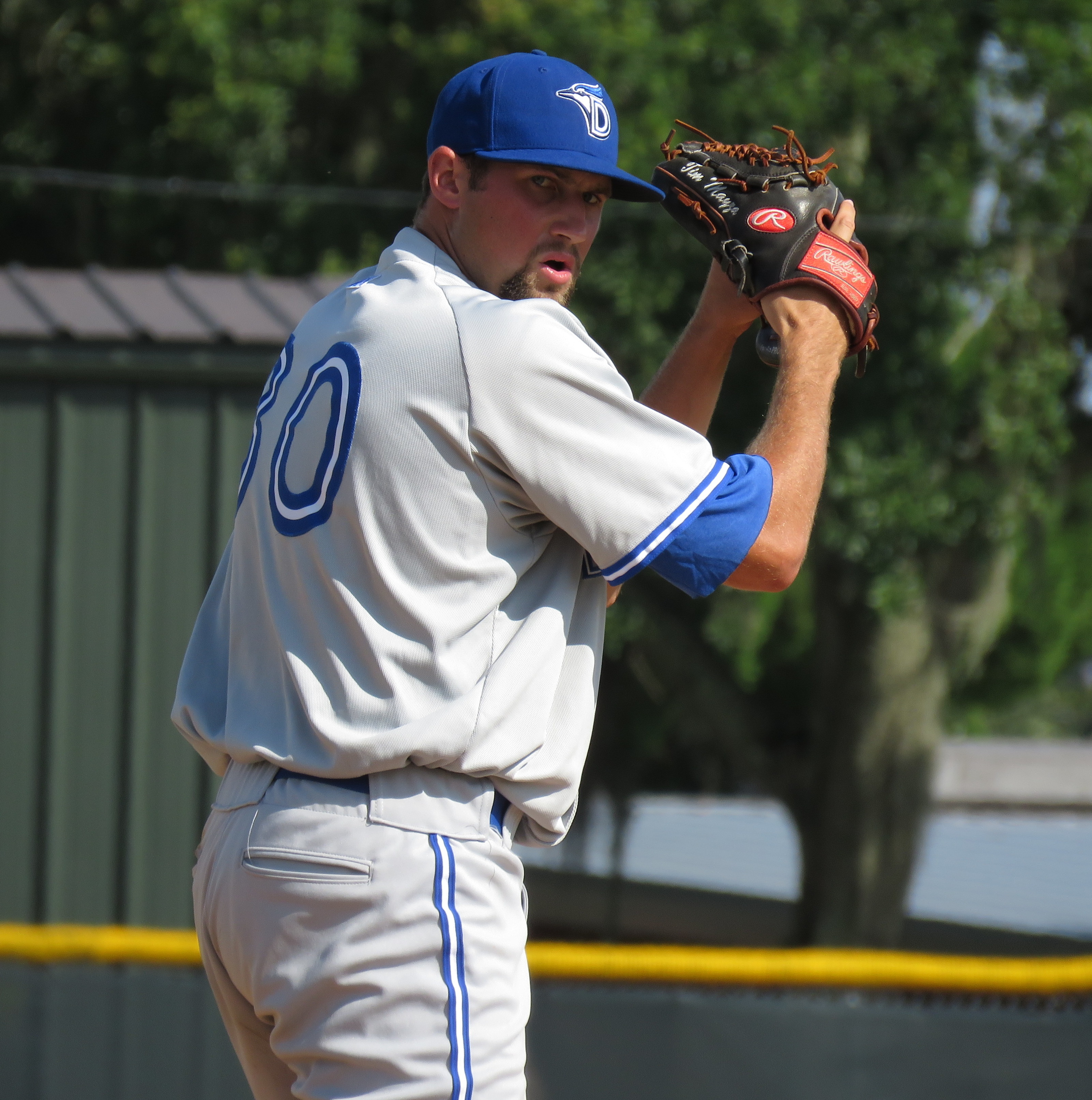
- Mayza with the Dunedin Blue Jays in 2016

Philadelphia Phillies – No. 37
- Pitcher
- Born: January 15, 1992 (age 34); Allentown, Pennsylvania, U.S.
- Bats: Left Throws: Left

MLB debut
- August 15, 2017, for the Toronto Blue Jays

MLB statistics (through 2026 season)
- Win–loss record: 23–13
- Earned run average: 3.80
- Strikeouts: 383
- Stats at Baseball Reference

Teams
- Toronto Blue Jays (2017–2019, 2021–2024); New York Yankees (2024); Pittsburgh Pirates (2025); Philadelphia Phillies (2025–present)

Timothy Gerard Mayza (born January 15, 1992) is an American professional baseball pitcher for the Philadelphia Phillies of Major League Baseball (MLB). He has previously played in MLB for the Toronto Blue Jays, New York Yankees, and Pittsburgh Pirates. The Blue Jays selected Mayza in the 12th round of the 2013 MLB draft, and he made his MLB debut in 2017.

== Amateur career ==
Mayza played baseball, basketball, and soccer for Upper Perkiomen High School in Red Hill, Pennsylvania. As a sophomore, he threw a no-hitter. In his final high school season, Mayza pitched to a 5–3 win–loss record, 2.73 earned run average (ERA), and 53 strikeouts in 51 innings pitched. He attended Millersville University of Pennsylvania and played college baseball for the Millersville Marauders. In 2012, he played collegiate summer baseball with the Cotuit Kettleers of the Cape Cod Baseball League. In his final year with Millersville, Mayza posted an 11–3 record, 1.55 ERA, and 91 strikeouts in 98 2/3 innings.

== Professional career ==
=== Toronto Blue Jays ===
The Toronto Blue Jays selected Mayza in the 12th round of the 2013 Major League Baseball draft. He received a $100,000 signing bonus and was assigned to the Rookie-level Gulf Coast League Blue Jays to begin his professional career. After three appearances in the Gulf Coast League, Mayza was promoted to the Rookie Advanced Bluefield Blue Jays of the Appalachian League. Mayza made 13 total appearances in 2013 and posted a 1–4 record, 7.76 ERA, and 27 strikeouts in 29 innings pitched. In 2014, he split time between Bluefield and the Low–A Vancouver Canadians. In 26 2/3 innings, Mayza worked to a 2–4 record, 6.75 ERA, and 20 strikeouts.

Mayza pitched the entire 2015 season with the Single–A Lansing Lugnuts. He made 26 appearances for the Lugnuts, and posted a 3–2 record, 3.07 ERA, and 62 strikeouts in 55 2/3 innings pitched. Mayza continued to progress through the Blue Jays organization, beginning the 2016 season with the High–A Dunedin Blue Jays. In June, he earned a promotion to the Double–A New Hampshire Fisher Cats, where he finished the year. Mayza made a career-high 42 pitching appearances in 2016 and went 3–3 with a 2.25 ERA and 65 strikeouts in 64 total innings. On January 19, 2017, Mayza was invited to Major League spring training. He was assigned to Double-A New Hampshire to begin the 2017 season. After 29 appearances, Mayza was promoted to the Triple–A Buffalo Bisons. He made 11 relief appearances, posting a 0.93 ERA, before his first promotion to the Majors.

On August 14, 2017, Mayza was promoted to the major leagues for the first time. He made his major league debut on August 15, pitching a scoreless 9th inning in a 6–4 loss to the Tampa Bay Rays and recording his first major league strikeout against Peter Bourjos. Mayza was credited with his first major league win on September 12, when he pitched the bottom half of the 9th inning before the Blue Jays walked off the Baltimore Orioles 3–2.

Mayza split the 2018 season between the major leagues and the Buffalo Bisons. In 37 games for the Blue Jays, he posted a 2–0 record with a 3.28 ERA and 40 strikeouts over 35 2/3 innings.

On September 13, 2019, in the 10th inning in a game against the New York Yankees, Mayza threw a pitch behind Didi Gregorius and immediately crumpled to the ground in pain. The next day, it was revealed he had torn his UCL and would undergo Tommy John surgery. In 68 relief outings for Toronto in 2019, he compiled a 4.91 ERA with 55 strikeouts across 51 1/3 innings of work. Mayza was outrighted off the Blue Jays roster on November 20, 2019. He spent all of 2020 recovering from the surgery.

On April 1, 2021, Mayza was selected to the 40-man roster. That year, he recorded a 3.40 ERA and 57 strikeouts across 61 appearances for Toronto. On September 28, 2022, Mayza gave up Aaron Judge’s 61st home run, tying an American League record. He made 63 total appearances for the Blue Jays in 2022, compiling an 8–1 record and 3.14 ERA with 44 strikeouts across 48 2/3 innings pitched.

On January 13, 2023, Mayza signed a one-year, $2.1 million contract with the Blue Jays, avoiding salary arbitration. He made 69 appearances for Toronto in 2023, compiling a 1.52 ERA with 53 strikeouts across 53 1/3 innings of work.

Mayza began the 2024 campaign out of Toronto's bullpen, and struggled to an 8.03 ERA with 16 strikeouts across 24 2/3 innings pitched. On June 29, 2024, Mayza was designated for assignment by the Blue Jays. He was released by the organization on July 5.

=== New York Yankees ===
On July 10, 2024, Mayza signed a minor league contract with the New York Yankees. In 9 games for the Triple–A Scranton/Wilkes-Barre RailRiders, he posted a 2.16 ERA with 8 strikeouts. On August 16, the Yankees selected Mayza's contract, adding him to their active roster. In 15 appearances for New York, he recorded a 4.00 ERA with 12 strikeouts over 18 innings of work. On November 22, the Yankees non–tendered Mayza, making him a free agent.

=== Pittsburgh Pirates ===
On February 3, 2025, Mayza signed a one-year, $1.15 million contract with the Pittsburgh Pirates. On April 23, Mayza was shut down for six weeks after suffering a lat strain and teres major injury. He was transferred to the 60-day injured list the following day. In seven appearances for Pittsburgh, Mayza had recorded a 2.89 ERA with eight strikeouts across 9 1/3 innings pitched. Mayza was placed on release waivers on August 30.

=== Philadelphia Phillies ===
On August 31, 2025, Mayza was claimed off waivers by the Philadelphia Phillies. In eight appearances for Philadelphia, Mayza recorded a 4.91 ERA with seven strikeouts across 7 1/3 innings pitched.

On January 22, 2026, Mayza re-signed with the Phillies organization on a minor league contract. On March 22, the Phillies signed Mayza to a major league contract. In sixty appearances, Mayza recorded a 3.48 ERA with sixty-four strikeouts across 67 1/3 innings pitched.

On October 15, 2026, Dave Dombrowski announced the Phillies had re-signed Mayza to a one-year Major League deal through the 2027 season.

== Personal life ==
Mayza is the eldest of four children born to Jerry and Marlene Mayza. His father played NCAA Division III basketball for Allentown College, and his sister Deanna played basketball for the University of Hartford.
