= Santiago Espinal =

Dominican baseball player (born 1994)

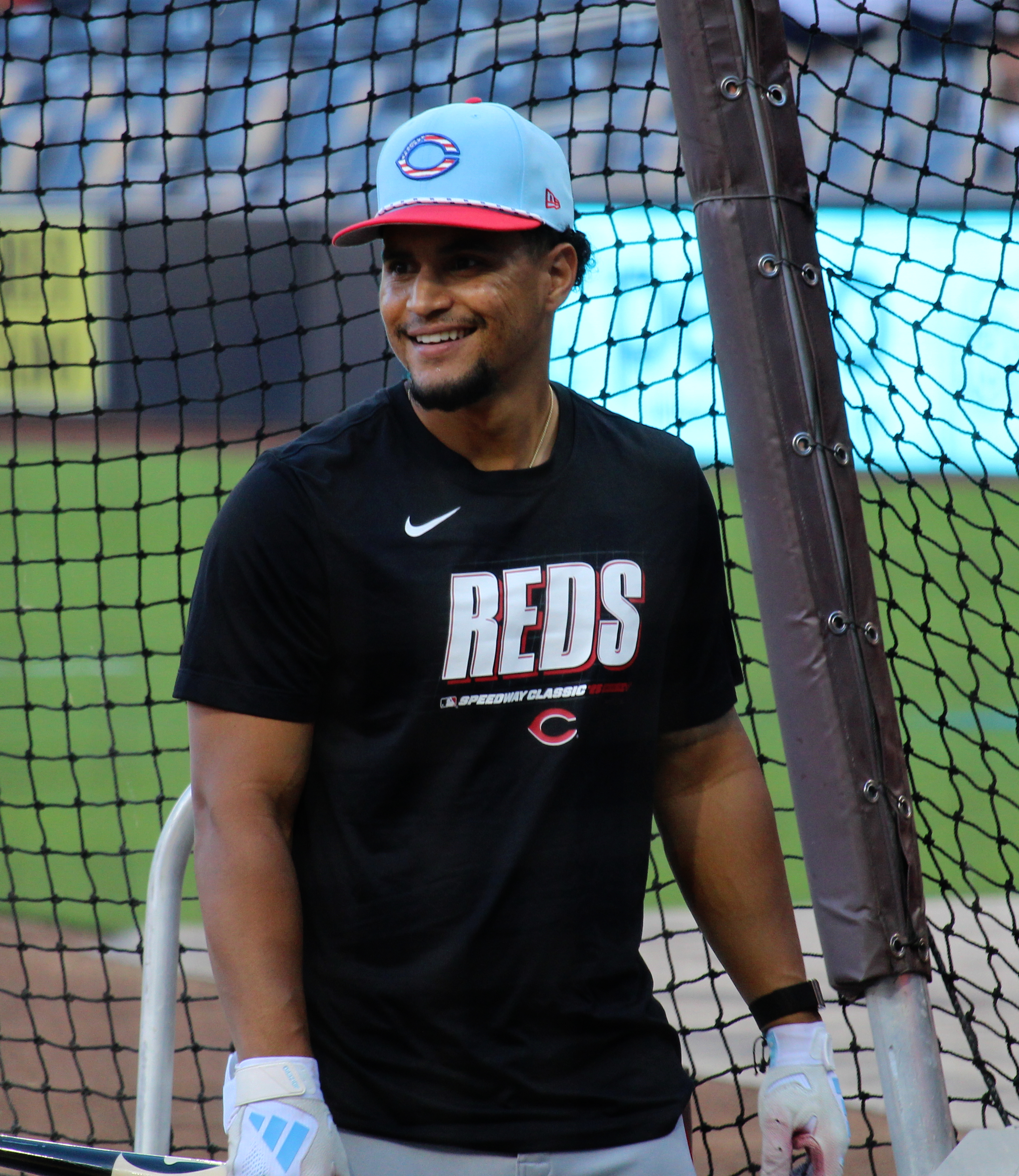
- Espinal with the Cincinnati Reds in 2025

Free agent
- Infielder
- Born: November 13, 1994 (age 32); Santiago, Dominican Republic
- Bats: Right Throws: Right

MLB debut
- July 25, 2020, for the Toronto Blue Jays

MLB statistics (through 2026 season)
- Batting average: .261
- Home runs: 21
- Runs batted in: 167
- Stats at Baseball Reference

Teams
- Toronto Blue Jays (2020–2023); Cincinnati Reds (2024–2025); Los Angeles Dodgers (2026)

Career highlights and awards
- All-Star (2022)

Santiago Roman Espinal (born November 13, 1994) is a Dominican professional baseball infielder who is a free agent. He has previously played in Major League Baseball (MLB) for the Toronto Blue Jays, Cincinnati Reds, and Los Angeles Dodgers. He was drafted by the Boston Red Sox in the 10th round of the 2016 MLB draft.

== Amateur career ==
Espinal was born and grew up in the Dominican Republic until age 13, when he moved to the US. He attended Lyman High School in Longwood, Florida for four years. He then moved to New York and graduated through Penn Foster High School. Espinal attended Seminole State College of Florida, and then attended Miami Dade College on a scholarship and played college baseball for them in 2016.

== Professional career ==
=== Boston Red Sox ===
Espinal was drafted by the Boston Red Sox in the 10th round, 298th overall, of the 2016 MLB draft.

Espinal played for the Rookie-level Gulf Coast League Red Sox in 2016, hitting a .244/.330/.267 slash line with 10 runs batted in (RBI). He played for the Single-A Greenville Drive in 2017, hitting .280/.334/.358 with four home runs and 46 RBI. Espinal began the 2018 season with the High-A Salem Red Sox, where he hit .313 in 65 games.

=== Toronto Blue Jays ===
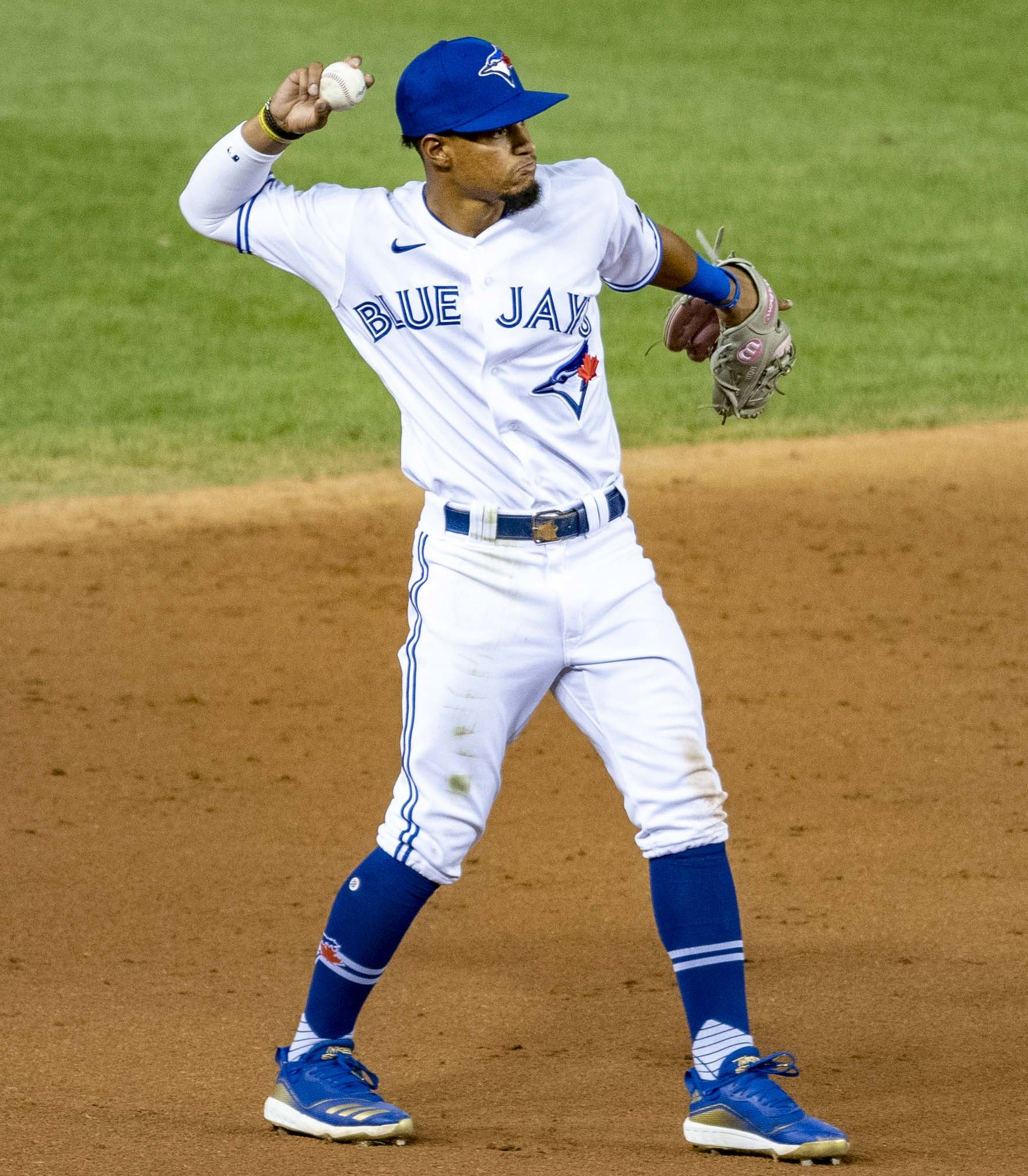
Espinal in 2020

On June 28, 2018, Espinal was traded to the Toronto Blue Jays in exchange for Steve Pearce and cash considerations. He split the remainder of 2018 between the High-A Dunedin Blue Jays and the Double-A New Hampshire Fisher Cats, hitting .297/.356/.444 with 10 home runs and 60 RBI between the two teams and Salem. Espinal played for the Surprise Saguaros of the Arizona Fall League (AFL) following the 2018 season.

Espinal split the 2019 season between New Hampshire and the Triple-A Buffalo Bisons, hitting a combined .287/.347/.393 with seven home runs and 71 RBI. Espinal was added to the Blue Jays 40-man roster after the 2019 season and on July 23, 2020, he was added to the Blue Jays active roster to begin the 2020 season, which had been delayed due to the COVID-19 pandemic. On July 25, 2020, he made his MLB debut as the starting third baseman against the Tampa Bay Rays, going hitless in two at-bats. Three days later, on July 28, Espinal got his first hit in the Major Leagues off of the Washington Nationals' Sam Freeman. He made 26 appearances for the Blue Jays during his rookie campaign, hitting .267 with no home runs and six RBI in 26 games.

On July 3, 2021, Espinal hit his first career major league home run, a two-run shot off Rays reliever Matt Wisler at Sahlen Field in Buffalo. Overall in 2021, Espinal batted .311/.376/.405 with two home runs, 17 RBI, and six stolen bases in 92 games. He led all qualifying AL third basemen with 16 total zone runs and a 3.13 range factor.

Espinal began the 2022 season expecting to platoon at second base with Cavan Biggio but by mid-May was receiving acclaim for his impressive offensive numbers and game-changing defense while Biggio was optioned to Buffalo after going 1-for-23 in 13 games. Blue Jays' General Manager Ross Atkins declared Espinal "an everyday player" after he was one of only five Blue Jays' players to appear in all of Toronto's first 17 games. He was selected for the 2022 All-Star Game as a replacement for Jose Altuve. In 135 games, he batted .267/.322/.370 and he had two hits, including a double, in the 2022 American League Wild Card Series.

On January 13, 2023, Espinal signed a one-year, $2.1 million contract with the Blue Jays, avoiding salary arbitration. In 93 games during the 2023 season, he batted .248/.310/.335 with two home runs and 25 RBI. He had two hits in two at-bats in the 2023 American League Wild Card Series as well.

=== Cincinnati Reds ===
On March 20, 2024, the Blue Jays traded Espinal to the Cincinnati Reds in exchange for right-handed pitcher Chris McElvain. He made 118 appearances for the Reds during the regular season, slashing .246/.295/.356 with nine home runs, 45 RBI, and 11 stolen bases.

Espinal played in 114 games for Cincinnati during the 2025 campaign, batting .243/.292/.282 with no home runs, 16 RBI, and two stolen bases. On October 31, he was removed from the 40-man roster and sent outright to the Triple-A Louisville Bats; he rejected the assignment and elected free agency the following day.

=== Los Angeles Dodgers ===
On February 16, 2026, Espinal signed a minor league contract with the Los Angeles Dodgers. On March 19, the Dodgers selected his contract and added him to their 40-man roster. He played in 26 games for Los Angeles before being designated for assignment on May 25. Espinal cleared waivers and was sent outright to Triple-A, after which he subsequently elected free agency. However, the following day, Espinal re-signed with the Dodgers on a major league contract. He was again designated for assignment on June 16 after appearing in 10 more games. Between his two stints in Los Angeles, Espinal batted .268 with one home run and seven RBI. He cleared waivers and elected free agency on June 18.

=== Texas Rangers ===
On July 2, 2026, Espinal signed a minor league contract with the Texas Rangers and was subsequently assigned to the Triple-A Round Rock Express. In 11 appearances for Round Rock, he batted .262/.333/.310 with six RBI and four stolen bases. Espinal was released by the Rangers organization on July 29.

=== Arizona Diamondbacks ===
On August 20, 2026, Espinal signed a minor league contract with the Arizona Diamondbacks. In 22 games with Triple-A Reno Aces he batted .268/.368/.427 with 2 home runs, 9 RBIs and 3 stolen bases. He elected free agency on November 2.

== See also ==
- List of Major League Baseball players from the Dominican Republic
