= Gosuke Katoh =

American baseball player (born 1994)

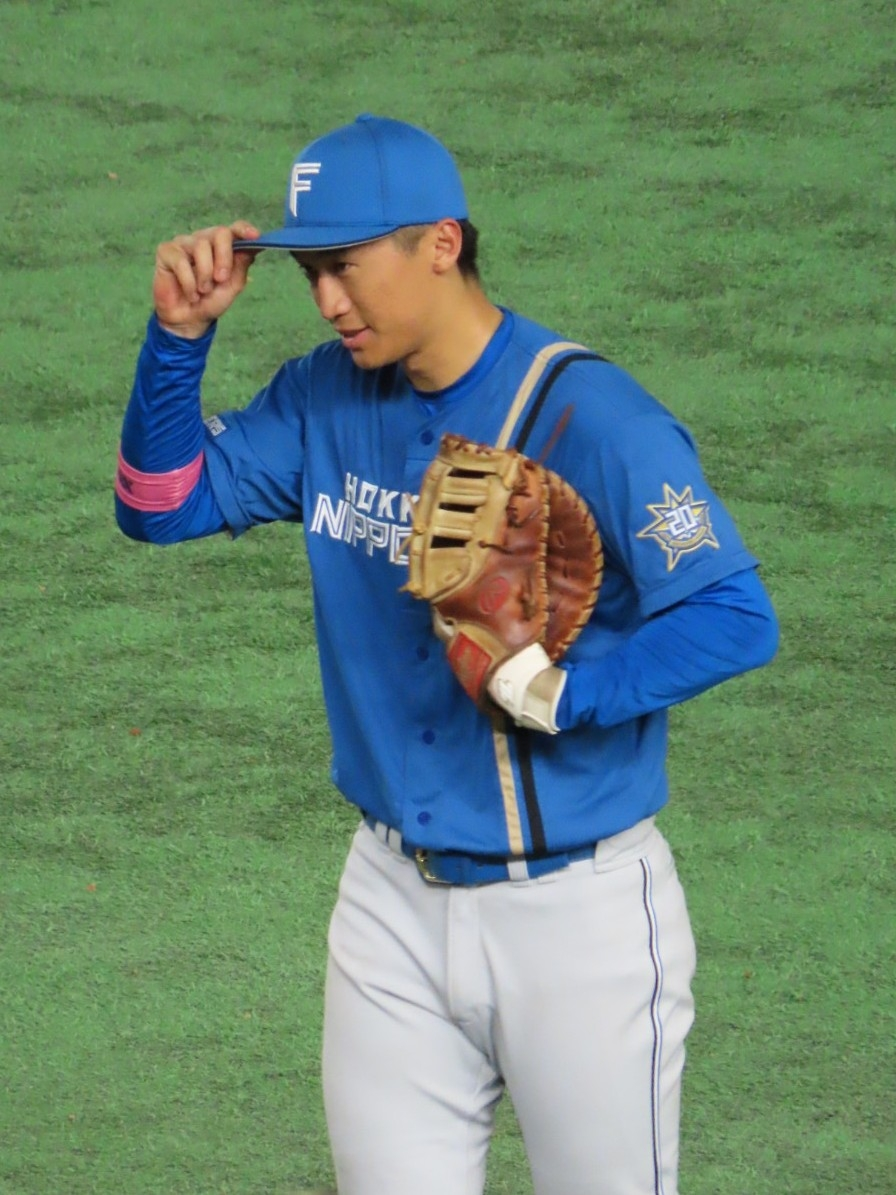
- Katoh with the Hokkaido Nippon-Ham Fighters in 2023
- Infielder
- Born: October 8, 1994 (age 30); Mountain View, California, U.S.
- Batted: Left Threw: Right

Professional debut
- MLB: April 9, 2022, for the Toronto Blue Jays
- NPB: May 25, 2023, for the Hokkaido Nippon-Ham Fighters

Last appearance
- MLB: April 28, 2022, for the Toronto Blue Jays
- NPB: September 7, 2024, for the Hokkaido Nippon-Ham Fighters

MLB statistics
- Batting average: .143
- Home runs: 0
- Runs batted in: 0

NPB statistics
- Batting average: .202
- Home runs: 6
- Runs batted in: 17

Teams
- Toronto Blue Jays (2022); Hokkaido Nippon-Ham Fighters (2023–2024)

Gosuke John Katoh (加藤 豪将, Katō Gōsuke, born October 8, 1994) is an American former professional baseball infielder. He played in Major League Baseball (MLB) for the Toronto Blue Jays and in Nippon Professional Baseball (NPB) for the Hokkaido Nippon-Ham Fighters.

== Playing career ==
=== New York Yankees ===
The New York Yankees selected Katoh in the second round of the 2013 Major League Baseball draft out of Rancho Bernardo High School. He made his professional debut for the Yankees' rookie-league affiliate, appearing in 50 games and batting .310 and was a Post-Season All-Star of the Gulf Coast League. In 2014, Katoh was ranked as the team's 11th best prospect by MLB.com. He played for the Single-A Charleston RiverDogs, hitting .222/.345/.326 in 121 games. The following year, Katoh split the season between Charleston and the rookie league Pulaski Yankees, batting a combined .239/.367/.334 with 6 home runs and 31 RBI. He was named a Post-Season All-Star of the Appalachian League.

For the 2016 season, Katoh returned to Charleston and batted .229/.320/.335 with 1 home run in 65 games. In 2017, he played for the High-A Tampa Yankees, slashing .293/.376/.440 in 84 contests. In 2018, Katoh played in 118 games for the Double-A Trenton Thunder, posting a slash of .229/.327/.335 with 5 home runs and 35 RBI. Katoh split the 2019 season between Trenton and the Triple-A Scranton/Wilkes-Barre RailRiders, hitting .267/.362/.401 with 11 home runs and 46 RBI in 113 games between the two teams. He elected free agency for the first time in his career following the 2019 season on November 4, 2019.

=== Miami Marlins ===
On December 18, 2019, Katoh signed a minor league contract with the Miami Marlins organization. Katoh did not play in a game in 2020 due to the cancellation of the minor league season because of the COVID-19 pandemic. He was not included in the team's initial 60-man player pool but spent the entire year in their alternate site in Jupiter, Florida. Katoh became a free agent on November 2, 2020.

=== San Diego Padres ===
On November 16, 2020, Katoh signed a minor league deal with the San Diego Padres organization. In 2021, Katoh played in 114 games for the Triple-A El Paso Chihuahuas, slashing .306/.388/.474 with 8 home runs and 42 RBI. He elected free agency following the season on November 7, 2021.

=== Toronto Blue Jays ===
On December 16, 2021, Katoh signed a minor league contract with the Toronto Blue Jays. On April 4, 2022, it was announced that Katoh had made the Opening Day roster. He made his MLB debut on April 9, pinch running for Alejandro Kirk. Katoh was optioned to the Triple-A Buffalo Bisons on April 10, but was recalled on April 14 after Teoscar Hernández was placed on the 10-day injured list. On April 21, he made his first MLB start, drawing a walk and scoring a run on a Bo Bichette RBI. On April 27, he got his first Major League base hit, a double, off of Boston Red Sox pitcher Michael Wacha. On May 1, as MLB active rosters decreased from 28 to 26, he was sent down to the Bisons again, and on May 4, he was designated for assignment.

=== New York Mets ===
On May 7, 2022, Katoh was waived by the Blue Jays but later claimed by the New York Mets. The Mets subsequently optioned him to their Triple-A affiliate, the Syracuse Mets. Katoh was recalled on May 17 but was optioned again on May 21 without appearing in a game. He was designated for assignment on June 16, then was sent outright to Syracuse.

=== Hokkaido Nippon-Ham Fighters ===
The Hokkaido Nippon-Ham Fighters of Nippon Professional Baseball (NPB) selected Katoh in the third round of the 2022 NPB draft. On November 4, 2022, he signed with the Fighters for ¥114 million (approximately $850,000). An oblique injury in March delayed the start to his 2023 season, and he made his NPB debut on May 25, 2023. On May 30, he hit his first NPB home run off of Yuta Ichikawa of the Tokyo Yakult Swallows. Katoh hit safely in his first 8 games in NPB, surpassing Shūzō Aono, who achieved the feat in 1962 with Toei. He would extend the hit streak to a final total of 10 games. In 62 games for the team, he batted .210/.284/.330 with six home runs and 16 RBI.

Katoh played in 28 contests for the Fighters in 2024, slashing .172/.238/.190 with no home runs and one RBI. On November 2, 2024, Katoh announced his retirement from professional baseball.

== Post-playing career ==
On November 9, 2024, Katoh announced that he had accepted a role in the Toronto Blue Jays' front office.
