= 2022 New York Mets season =

2022 New York Mets
- National League Wild Card
- League: National League
- Division: East
- Ballpark: Citi Field
- City: New York City, New York
- Record: 101–61 (.623)
- Divisional place: 2nd
- Owners: Steve Cohen
- President: Sandy Alderson
- General manager: Billy Eppler
- Manager: Buck Showalter
- Television: SportsNet New York; PIX 11 (CW affiliate) (Gary Cohen, Ron Darling, Keith Hernandez)
- Radio: WCBS 880 AM (English); New York Mets Radio Network (Howie Rose, Wayne Randazzo)

The 2022 New York Mets season was the franchise's 61st season, their 14th at Citi Field, and their second under majority owner Steve Cohen.

On December 2, 2021, Commissioner of Baseball Rob Manfred announced a lockout of players, following the expiration of the collective bargaining agreement (CBA) between the league and the Major League Baseball Players Association (MLBPA). On March 10, 2022, MLB and the MLBPA agreed to a new collective bargaining agreement, thus ending the lockout. Opening Day was played on April 7. MLB previously announced that several series would be cancelled due to the lockout. Despite this, the agreement provides for a 162-game season, with originally canceled games to be made up via doubleheaders.

On April 15, the Mets unveiled a long-awaited statue of legendary pitcher Tom Seaver by the main entrance to Citi Field. The statue featuring Seaver's iconic drop-and-drive delivery stands to the right of the Home Run Apple. It measures 10 feet high, 13½ feet long, and is made of 2,000 pounds of bronze and 1,200 pounds of stainless steel, which stands on a granite mound. "The Franchise" statue was sculpted by William Behrends and came in nine separate pieces, weighing 33,600 pounds

On July 9, the Mets retired Keith Hernandez's No. 17, which is immortalized on the left field overhang at Citi Field. He became the 7th Mets player to be honored.

On August 27, the Mets retired the No. 24 jersey once worn by Hall of Fame outfielder, Willie Mays, as part of their Old Timers' Day ceremonies. Mays finished his historic career with the Mets and became the 8th player in franchise history to have his number retired.

On September 19, the Mets clinched their first playoff appearance since 2016. It was their 10th playoff berth in franchise history.

After leading the National League East for most of the season (they had a 10 1/2 game lead at one point in the division), the Mets endured an underwhelming September. A resurgent Atlanta Braves team, which also swept them in the final weekend of the regular season, won the NL East, leaving the Mets to settle for the first Wild Card spot.

On October 4, the Mets earned their 100th win of the season, the team's fourth 100-win season in franchise history and their first since 1988. They ended the season 101–61, the second-most wins in a season in franchise history behind only the championship team of 1986.

The Mets were defeated by the San Diego Padres in three games in the National League Wild Card Series, becoming the first team in MLB history to produce only one hit in a winner-take-all playoff game. In addition to being the 18th occasion of a 100-win team not winning a postseason series, they became the first 100+ win team to fail to reach the Division Series since it was put into effect in 1995.

== Offseason ==
=== Lockout ===
The expiration of the league's collective bargaining agreement (CBA) with the Major League Baseball Players Association (MLBPA) occurred on December 1, 2021, with no new agreement in place. As a result, the team owners voted unanimously to lockout the players stopping all free agency and trades.

The parties came to an agreement on a new CBA on March 10, 2022.

=== Rule changes ===
Under the new CBA, several new rules were instituted for the 2022 season. The National League will adopt the designated hitter full-time, a draft lottery will be implemented, the postseason will expand from ten teams to twelve, and advertising patches will appear on player uniforms and helmets for the first time.

=== Transactions ===
==== 2021 ====
- November 24 – signed center field prospect Nick Plummer to a 1-year, $570,500 contract.
- November 27 – signed outfielder Starling Marte to a 4-year, $78 million contract. The Mets also signed outfielder Mark Canha to a 2-year, $26.5 million contract (with a 3-year option) and infielder Eduardo Escobar to a 2-year, $20 million contract.
- December 1 – signed three-time Cy Young Award-winning pitcher Max Scherzer to a 3-year, $130 million contract.

==== 2022 ====
- March 12 – acquired right-handed starting pitcher Chris Bassitt from the Oakland Athletics for pitching prospects Adam Oller and J. T. Ginn.
- March 13 – signed right-handed relief pitcher Adam Ottavino to a 1-year, $4 million contract with $1 million in performance incentives.
- April 3 – acquired left-handed relief pitcher Joely Rodríguez from the New York Yankees in exchange for right-handed reliever Miguel Castro.

== Regular season ==
=== Transactions ===
==== 2022 ====
- July 22 – acquired designated hitter Daniel Vogelbach from the Pittsburgh Pirates in exchange for right-handed relief pitcher Colin Holderman.
- July 28 – acquired outfielder Tyler Naquin and left-handed reliever Phillip Diehl from the Cincinnati Reds in exchange for minor leaguers José Acuña and Hector Rodríguez.
- August 2 – acquired outfielder Darin Ruf from the San Francisco Giants in exchange for infielder J.D. Davis and three minor league pitching prospects: Thomas Szapucki, Nick Zwack, and Carson Seymour.
- August 2 – acquired right-handed relief pitcher Mychal Givens from the Chicago Cubs in exchange for minor league pitching prospect Saul Gonzalez.

== Roster ==
2022 New York Mets
Roster
Pitchers: 71 R. J. Alvarez; 40 Chris Bassitt; 70 José Buttó; 59 Carlos Carrasco; 58 Alex Claudio; 46 Sam Clay; 48 Jacob deGrom; 39 Edwin Díaz; 64 Nate Fisher; 60 Mychal Givens; 35 Colin Holderman; 34 Tommy Hunter; 44 Yoan López; 67 Seth Lugo; 65 Trevor May; 68 Adonis Medina; 38 Tylor Megill; 63 Bryce Montes de Oca; 85 Stephen Nogosek; 0 Adam Ottavino; 23 David Peterson; 72 Jake Reed; 61 Sean Reid-Foley; 30 Joely Rodríguez; 21 Max Scherzer; 43 Chasen Shreve; 62 Drew Smith; 63 Thomas Szapucki; 99 Taijuan Walker; 29 Trevor Williams; 63 Rob Zastryzny	Catchers: 50 Francisco Álvarez; 4 Patrick Mazeika; 33 James McCann; 3 Tomas Nido; 35 Michael Pérez; Infielders: 20 Pete Alonso; 22 Brett Baty; 24 Robinson Canó; 28 J. D. Davis; 10 Eduardo Escobar; 13 Luis Guillorme; 12 Francisco Lindor; 15 Deven Marrero; 1 Jeff McNeil; 28 Darin Ruf; 43 Yolmer Sánchez; 2 Dominic Smith; 27 Mark Vientos; 32 Daniel Vogelbach	Outfielders: 19 Mark Canha; 4 Terrance Gore; 22 Ender Inciarte; 16 Travis Jankowski; 26 Khalil Lee; 6 Starling Marte; 25 Tyler Naquin; 9 Brandon Nimmo; 18 Nick Plummer; 15 Matt Reynolds; Other batters: 27 Travis Blankenhorn	Manager: 11 Buck Showalter; Coaches: 79 Danny Barnes (assistant pitching); 49 Jeremy Barnes (assistant hitting); 52 Craig Bjornson (bullpen); 51 Eric Chavez (hitting); 56 Joey Cora (third base/infield); 88 Rafael Fernandez (BP pitcher); 55 Jeremy Hefner (pitching); 54 Wayne Kirby (first base); 78 Eric Langill (bullpen catcher); 57 Dave Racaniello (bullpen catcher); 53 Glenn Sherlock (bench)

== Standings ==
=== National League East ===
NL East
Team	W	L	Pct.	GB	Home	Road
Atlanta Braves	101	61	.623	—	55‍–‍26	46‍–‍35
New York Mets	101	61	.623	—	54‍–‍27	47‍–‍34
Philadelphia Phillies	87	75	.537	14	47‍–‍34	40‍–‍41
Miami Marlins	69	93	.426	32	34‍–‍47	35‍–‍46
Washington Nationals	55	107	.340	46	26‍–‍55	29‍–‍52

=== National League Wild Card ===
Division leaders
Team	W	L	Pct.
Los Angeles Dodgers	111	51	.685
Atlanta Braves	101	61	.623
St. Louis Cardinals	93	69	.574

Wild Card teams (Top 3 teams qualify for postseason)
Team	W	L	Pct.	GB
New York Mets	101	61	.623	+14
San Diego Padres	89	73	.549	+2
Philadelphia Phillies	87	75	.537	—
Milwaukee Brewers	86	76	.531	1
San Francisco Giants	81	81	.500	6
Arizona Diamondbacks	74	88	.457	13
Chicago Cubs	74	88	.457	13
Miami Marlins	69	93	.426	18
Colorado Rockies	68	94	.420	19
Pittsburgh Pirates	62	100	.383	25
Cincinnati Reds	62	100	.383	25
Washington Nationals	55	107	.340	32

=== Record vs. opponents ===
2022 National League record Source: MLB Standings Grid – 2022
Team	AZ	ATL	CHC	CIN	COL	LAD	MIA	MIL	NYM	PHI	PIT	SD	SF	STL	WSH	AL
Arizona	—	2–4	4–3	3–4	9–10	5–14	5–1	4–3	2–4	3–3	4–3	5–14	10–9	2–5	4–3	12–8
Atlanta	4–2	—	3–3	4–3	6–1	2–4	13–6	3–3	10–9	11–8	7–0	3–4	4–3	4–3	14–5	13–7
Chicago	3–4	3–3	—	11–8	3–4	0–7	4–2	10–9	4–3	6–0	10–9	2–5	2–5	6–13	4–2	6–14
Cincinnati	4–3	3–4	8–11	—	2–4	0–7	4–3	6–13	1–5	1–6	7–12	0–6	4–2	7–12	3–4	12–8
Colorado	10–9	1–6	4–3	4–2	—	8–11	2–4	3–4	2–5	2–5	3–3	10–9	5–14	2–4	3–4	9–11
Los Angeles	14–5	4–2	7–0	7–0	11–8	—	6–1	4–3	3–4	3–4	1–5	14–5	15–4	4–2	3–3	15–5
Miami	1–5	6–13	2–4	3–4	4–2	1–6	—	4–3	6–13	7–12	4–3	3–4	3–4	2–4	15–4	8–12
Milwaukee	3–4	3–3	9–10	13–6	4–3	3–4	3–4	—	2–4	2–4	11–8	3–4	3–4	9–10	3–3	15–5
New York	4–2	9–10	3–4	5–1	5–2	4–3	13–6	4–2	—	14–5	6–1	2–4	4–3	5–2	14–5	9–11
Philadelphia	3–3	8–11	0–6	6–1	5–2	4–3	12–7	4–2	5–14	—	6–1	4–3	1–5	4–3	16–3	9–11
Pittsburgh	3–4	0–7	9–10	12–7	3–3	5–1	3–4	8–11	1–6	1–6	—	2–4	1–5	6–13	4–3	4–16
San Diego	14–5	4–3	5–2	6–0	9–10	5–14	4–3	4–3	4–2	3–4	4–2	—	13–6	2–4	4–3	8–12
San Francisco	9–10	3–4	5–2	2–4	14–5	4–15	4–3	4–3	3–4	5–1	5–1	6–13	—	3–4	4–2	10–10
St. Louis	5–2	3–4	13–6	12–7	4–2	2–4	4–2	10–9	2–5	3–4	13–6	4–2	4–3	—	4–3	10–10
Washington	3–4	5–14	2–4	4–3	4–3	3–3	4–15	3–3	5–14	3–16	3–4	3–4	2–4	3–4	—	8–12

Updated with the results of all games through October 5, 2022.

== Game log ==
=== Regular season ===
Legend
Mets Win	Mets Loss	Game Postponed	Clinched playoff spot
Bold = Mets team member

2022 Game Log
Overall: 101–61 (Home: 54–27; Away: 47–34)
April: 15–7 (Home: 6–3; Away: 9–4)

#	Date	Opponent	Box Score	Win	Loss	Save	Location (Attendance)	Record
1	April 7	@ Nationals	5–1	**Megill** (1–0)	Corbin (0–1)	—	Nationals Park (35,052)	1–0
2	April 8	@ Nationals	7–3	**Scherzer** (1–0)	Gray (0–1)	—	Nationals Park (25,677)	2–0
3	April 9	@ Nationals	5–0	**Bassitt** (1–0)	Adon (0–1)	—	Nationals Park (21,369)	3–0
4	April 10	@ Nationals	2–4	Finnegan (1-0)	**Williams** (0–1)	Rainey (1)	Nationals Park (23,158)	3–1
5	April 11	@ Phillies	4–5	Domínguez (1–0)	**Lugo** (0–1)	Hand (1)	Citizens Bank Park (22,317)	3–2
6	April 12	@ Phillies	2–0	**Megill** (2–0)	Wheeler (0–1)	**Díaz** (1)	Citizens Bank Park (26,045)	4–2
7	April 13	@ Phillies	9–6	**Scherzer** (2–0)	Nola (1–1)	—	Citizens Bank Park (31,190)	5–2
8	April 15	Diamondbacks	10–3	**Bassitt** (2–0)	Davies (0–1)	—	**Citi Field** (43,820)	6–2
9	April 16	Diamondbacks	2–3	Poppen (1–0)	**Rodríguez** (0–1)	Melancon (1)	**Citi Field** (37,935)	6–3
10	April 17	Diamondbacks	5–0	**Shreve** (1–0)	Ramirez (0–1)	—	**Citi Field** (24,515)	7–3
—	April 18	Giants	Postponed (rain); rescheduled for April 19					
11	April 19 (1)	Giants	5–4 (10)	**Ottavino** (1–0)	García (1–1)	—	**Citi Field** (N/A)	8–3
12	April 19 (2)	Giants	3–1	**Scherzer** (3–0)	Webb (1–1)	**May** (1)	**Citi Field** (27,490)	9–3
13	April 20	Giants	2–5	Rodón (2–0)	**Bassitt** (2–1)	McGee (2)	**Citi Field** (30,050)	9–4
14	April 21	Giants	6–2	**Carrasco** (1–0)	DeSclafani (0–1)	—	**Citi Field** (28,760)	10–4
15	April 22	@ Diamondbacks	6–5 (10)	**Díaz** (1–0)	Melancon (0–2)	**Lugo** (1)	Chase Field (20,939)	11–4
16	April 23	@ Diamondbacks	2–5	Castellanos (1–0)	**Williams** (0–2)	Mantiply (1)	Chase Field (25,413)	11–5
17	April 24	@ Diamondbacks	6–2	**Megill** (3–0)	Wendelken (0–1)	—	Chase Field (23,570)	12–5
18	April 25	@ Cardinals	5–2	**May** (1–0)	Gallegos (0–1)	**Díaz** (2)	Busch Stadium (35,455)	13–5
19	April 26	@ Cardinals	3–0	**Bassitt** (3–1)	Hicks (1–2)	**Díaz** (3)	Busch Stadium (32,215)	14–5
20	April 27	@ Cardinals	5–10	Woodford (1–0)	**Carrasco** (1–1)	—	Busch Stadium (34,822)	14–6
21	April 29	Phillies	3–0	**Megill** (4–0)	Nola (1–3)	**Díaz** (4)	**Citi Field** (32,416)	15–6
22	April 30	Phillies	1–4	Norwood (1–0)	**Ottavino** (1–1)	Knebel (4)	**Citi Field** (40,036)	15–7

May: 19–10 (Home: 12–5; Away: 7–5)

#	Date	Opponent	Box Score	Win	Loss	Save	Location (Attendance)	Record
23	May 1	Phillies	10–6	**Scherzer** (4–0)	Eflin (1–2)	—	**Citi Field** (30,608)	16–7
24	May 2	Braves	2–5	Fried (3–2)	**Bassitt** (3–2)	Jansen (7)	**Citi Field** (23,413)	16–8
25	May 3 (1)	Braves	5–4	**Peterson** (1–0)	Morton (1–3)	**Díaz** (5)	**Citi Field** (N/A)	17–8
26	May 3 (2)	Braves	3–0	**Carrasco** (2–1)	Wright (3–1)	**Lugo** (2)	**Citi Field** (27,206)	18–8
27	May 4	Braves	2–9	Anderson (3–1)	**Megill** (4–1)	—	**Citi Field** (23,973)	18–9
28	May 5	@ Phillies	8–7	**Medina** (1–0)	Knebel (0–2)	**Díaz** (6)	Citizens Bank Park (24,040)	19–9
—	May 6	@ Phillies	Postponed (rain); rescheduled for August 20					
—	May 7	@ Phillies	Postponed (rain); rescheduled for May 8					
29	May 8 (1)	@ Phillies	2–3	Gibson (3–1)	**Scherzer** (4–1)	Knebel (5)	Citizens Bank Park (N/A)	19–10
30	May 8 (2)	@ Phillies	6–1	**Bassitt** (4–2)	Sánchez (0–1)	—	Citizens Bank Park (37,133)	20–10
31	May 10	@ Nationals	4–2	**Carrasco** (3–1)	Edwards Jr. (0–1)	**Díaz** (7)	Nationals Park (21,955)	21–10
32	May 11	@ Nationals	3–8	Sanchez (2–2)	**Megill** (4–2)	—	Nationals Park (19,715)	21–11
33	May 12	@ Nationals	4–1	**Walker** (1–0)	Adon (1–6)	—	Nationals Park (21,213)	22–11
34	May 13	Mariners	1–2	Sewald (2–1)	**Smith** (0–1)	Steckenrider (2)	**Citi Field** (36,629)	22–12
35	May 14	Mariners	5–4	**Ottavino** (2–1)	Muñoz (1–1)	**Díaz** (8)	**Citi Field** (37,140)	23–12
36	May 15	Mariners	7–8	Ray (4–3)	**Shreve** (1–1)	Castillo (2)	**Citi Field** (38,476)	23–13
—	May 16	Cardinals	Postponed (rain); rescheduled for May 17					
37	May 17 (1)	Cardinals	3–1	**Reed** (1–0)	Mikolas (3–2)	**Díaz** (9)	**Citi Field** (N/A)	24–13
38	May 17 (2)	Cardinals	3–4	Helsley (2–0)	**Rodríguez** (0–2)	Gallegos (7)	**Citi Field** (27,457)	24–14
39	May 18	Cardinals	11–4	**Scherzer** (5–1)	Walsh (0–1)	—	**Citi Field** (32,798)	25–14
40	May 19	Cardinals	7–6 (10)	**Holderman** (1–0)	Gallegos (0–2)	—	**Citi Field** (28,801)	26–14
—	May 20	@ Rockies	Postponed (snow); rescheduled for May 21					
41	May 21 (1)	@ Rockies	5–1	**Carrasco** (4–1)	Márquez (1–4)	—	Coors Field (20,737)	27–14
42	May 21 (2)	@ Rockies	3–11	Goudeau (1–0)	**Williams** (0–3)	—	Coors Field (25,783)	27–15
43	May 22	@ Rockies	2–0	**Walker** (2–0)	Gomber (2–4)	**Díaz** (10)	Coors Field (35,248)	28–15
44	May 23	@ Giants	13–3	**Peterson** (2–0)	Cobb (3–2)	—	Oracle Park (25,690)	29–15
45	May 24	@ Giants	12–13	Brebbia (2–0)	**Díaz** (1–1)	—	Oracle Park (27,683)	29–16
46	May 25	@ Giants	3–9	Junis (2–1)	**Szapucki** (0–1)	—	Oracle Park (27,432)	29–17
47	May 27	Phillies	8–6	**Carrasco** (5–1)	Falter (0–2)	**Díaz** (11)	**Citi Field** (30,175)	30–17
48	May 28	Phillies	8–2	**Walker** (3–0)	Eflin (1–4)	—	**Citi Field** (37,455)	31–17
49	May 29	Phillies	5–4 (10)	**Díaz** (2–1)	Knebel (1–4)	—	**Citi Field** (36,513)	32–17
50	May 30	Nationals	13–5	**Holderman** (2–0)	Fedde (3–4)	—	**Citi Field** (22,007)	33–17
51	May 31	Nationals	10–0	**Williams** (1–3)	Corbin (1–8)	—	**Citi Field** (25,263)	34–17

June: 13–12 (Home: 6–4; Away: 7–8)

#	Date	Opponent	Box Score	Win	Loss	Save	Location (Attendance)	Record
52	June 1	Nationals	5–0	**Carrasco** (6–1)	Lee (0–1)	—	**Citi Field** (25,417)	35–17
53	June 2	@ Dodgers	0–2	Gonsolin (6–0)	**Walker** (3–1)	Kimbrel (11)	Dodger Stadium (48,018)	35–18
54	June 3	@ Dodgers	1–6	Anderson (7–0)	**Bassitt** (4–3)	—	Dodger Stadium (52,505)	35–19
55	June 4	@ Dodgers	9–4	**Holderman** (3–0)	Buehler (6–2)	—	Dodger Stadium (50,165)	36–19
56	June 5	@ Dodgers	5–4 (10)	**Lugo** (1–1)	Kimbrel (0–2)	**Medina** (1)	Dodger Stadium (48,672)	37–19
57	June 6	@ Padres	11–5	**Carrasco** (7–1)	Snell (0–3)	—	Petco Park (34,858)	38–19
58	June 7	@ Padres	0–7	Darvish (5–3)	**Walker** (3–2)	—	Petco Park (31,796)	38–20
59	June 8	@ Padres	2–13	Manaea (3–3)	**Bassitt** (4–4)	—	Petco Park (40,992)	38–21
60	June 10	@ Angels	7–3	**Peterson** (3–0)	Díaz (1–1)	—	Angel Stadium (31,499)	39–21
61	June 11	@ Angels	6–11	Lorenzen (6–3)	**Carrasco** (7–2)	—	Angel Stadium (36,408)	39–22
62	June 12	@ Angels	4–1	**Walker** (4–2)	Sandoval (3–2)	**Díaz** (12)	Angel Stadium (36,598)	40–22
63	June 14	Brewers	4–0	**Bassitt** (5–4)	Houser (3–7)	—	**Citi Field** (28,495)	41–22
64	June 15	Brewers	2–10	Burnes (4–4)	**Peterson** (3–1)	—	**Citi Field** (25,422)	41–23
65	June 16	Brewers	5–4	**Smith** (1–1)	Suter (1–1)	**Díaz** (13)	**Citi Field** (25,002)	42–23
66	June 17	Marlins	10–4	**Carrasco** (8–2)	López (4–3)	—	**Citi Field** (36,111)	43–23
67	June 18	Marlins	3–2	**Walker** (5–2)	Garrett (1–2)	**Díaz** (14)	**Citi Field** (40,021)	44–23
68	June 19	Marlins	2–6	Alcántara (7–2)	**Bassitt** (5–5)	—	**Citi Field** (41,255)	44–24
69	June 20	Marlins	6–0	**Peterson** (4–1)	Rogers (3–6)	—	**Citi Field** (34,947)	45–24
70	June 21	@ Astros	2–8	Urquidy (6–3)	**Williams** (1–4)	—	Minute Maid Park (35,140)	45–25
71	June 22	@ Astros	3–5	García (5–5)	**Carrasco** (8–3)	Pressly (14)	Minute Maid Park (35,450)	45–26
72	June 24	@ Marlins	5–3	**Walker** (6–2)	Alcántara (7–3)	**Díaz** (15)	LoanDepot Park (11,444)	46–26
73	June 25	@ Marlins	5–3	**Bassitt** (6–5)	Yacabonis (0–1)	**Díaz** (16)	LoanDepot Park (18,722)	47–26
74	June 26	@ Marlins	2–3	Scott (3–2)	**Ottavino** (2–2)	—	LoanDepot Park (19,343)	47–27
75	June 28	Astros	1–9	Valdez (8–3)	**Carrasco** (8–4)	—	**Citi Field** (36,673)	47–28
76	June 29	Astros	0–2	Verlander (10–3)	**Smith** (1–2)	Pressly (16)	**Citi Field** (29,230)	47–29

July: 17–8 (Home: 7–5; Away: 10–3)

#	Date	Opponent	Box Score	Win	Loss	Save	Location (Attendance)	Record
77	July 1	Rangers	4–3	**Peterson** (5–1)	Otto (4–4)	**Díaz** (17)	**Citi Field** (35,639)	48–29
78	July 2	Rangers	3–7	Pérez (7–2)	**Williams** (1–5)	—	**Citi Field** (26,494)	48–30
79	July 3	Rangers	4–1	**Carrasco** (9–4)	Gray (4–4)	**Díaz** (18)	**Citi Field** (25,241)	49–30
80	July 4	@ Reds	7–4	**Walker** (7–2)	Greene (3–10)	**Lugo** (3)	Great American Ball Park (19,533)	50–30
81	July 5	@ Reds	0–1	Strickland (2–2)	**Lugo** (1–2)	—	Great American Ball Park (13,487)	50–31
82	July 6	@ Reds	8–3 (10)	**Ottavino** (3–2)	Moreta (0–2)	—	Great American Ball Park (13,540)	51–31
83	July 7	Marlins	10–0	**Williams** (2–5)	Castano (1–2)	—	**Citi Field** (30,555)	52–31
84	July 8	Marlins	2–5	López (6–4)	**Bassitt** (6–6)	Scott (11)	**Citi Field** (25,208)	52–32
85	July 9	Marlins	5–4 (10)	**Holderman** (4–0)	Scott (4–3)	—	**Citi Field** (43,336)	53–32
86	July 10	Marlins	0–2 (10)	Bleier (1–1)	**Hunter** (0–1)	Scott (12)	**Citi Field** (34,774)	53–33
87	July 11	@ Braves	4–1	**Scherzer** (6–1)	Fried (9–3)	**Díaz** (19)	Truist Park (42,925)	54–33
88	July 12	@ Braves	1–4	Matzek (1–2)	**Peterson** (5–2)	Minter (4)	Truist Park (42,217)	54–34
89	July 13	@ Braves	7–3	**Bassitt** (7–6)	Morton (5–4)	—	Truist Park (34,879)	55–34
90	July 14	@ Cubs	8–0	**Carrasco** (10–4)	Thompson (7–4)	**Williams** (1)	Wrigley Field (34,051)	56–34
—	July 15	@ Cubs	Postponed (rain); rescheduled for July 16					
91	July 16 (1)	@ Cubs	2–1 (11)	**Ottavino** (4–2)	Givens (5–1)	**Díaz** (20)	Wrigley Field (39,219)	57–34
92	July 16 (2)	@ Cubs	4–3 (10)	**López** (1–0)	Givens (5–2)	—	Wrigley Field (34,366)	58–34
93	July 17	@ Cubs	2–3	Wick (2–5)	**Smith** (1–3)	Robertson (13)	Wrigley Field (34,424)	58–35
**92nd All-Star Game in Los Angeles, California**
94	July 22	Padres	1–4	Darvish (9–4)	**Scherzer** (6–2)	Rogers (27)	**Citi Field** (36,855)	58–36
95	July 23	Padres	1–2	Snell (2–5)	**Bassitt** (7–7)	Rogers (28)	**Citi Field** (39,359)	58–37
96	July 24	Padres	8–5	**Smith** (2–3)	Musgrove (8–3)	**Díaz** (21)	**Citi Field** (35,475)	59–37
97	July 26	Yankees	6–3	**Walker** (8–2)	Montgomery (3–3)	**Díaz** (22)	**Citi Field** (42,364)	60–37
98	July 27	Yankees	3–2	**Lugo** (2–2)	Peralta (2–3)	—	**Citi Field** (43,693)	61–37
99	July 29	@ Marlins	6–4	**Ottavino** (5–2)	Okert (5–1)	**Díaz** (23)	LoanDepot Park (15,131)	62–37
100	July 30	@ Marlins	4–0	**Carrasco** (11–4)	Neidert (0–1)	—	LoanDepot Park (16,655)	63–37
101	July 31	@ Marlins	9–3	**Walker** (9–2)	López (7–6)	—	LoanDepot Park (17,449)	64–37

August: 19–11 (Home: 13–4; Away: 6–7)

#	Date	Opponent	Box Score	Win	Loss	Save	Location (Attendance)	Record
102	August 1	@ Nationals	7–3	**Scherzer** (7–2)	Corbin (4–15)	—	Nationals Park (29,034)	65–37
103	August 2	@ Nationals	1–5	Arano (1–0)	**Nogosek** (0–1)	—	Nationals Park (29,878)	65–38
104	August 3	@ Nationals	9–5	**Bassitt** (8–7)	Sánchez (0–4)	—	Nationals Park (27,851)	66–38
105	August 4	Braves	6–4	**Carrasco** (12–4)	Wright (13–5)	**Díaz** (24)	**Citi Field** (38,693)	67–38
106	August 5	Braves	6–9	Minter (5–3)	**Walker** (9–3)	—	**Citi Field** (40,305)	67–39
107	August 6 (1)	Braves	8–5	**Peterson** (6–2)	Odorizzi (4–4)	**Díaz** (25)	**Citi Field** (37,790)	68–39
108	August 6 (2)	Braves	6–2	**Scherzer** (8–2)	Fried (10–4)	—	**Citi Field** (37,452)	69–39
109	August 7	Braves	5–2	**deGrom** (1–0)	Strider (6–4)	**Díaz** (26)	**Citi Field** (37,717)	70–39
110	August 8	Reds	5–1	**Bassitt** (9–7)	Dunn (0–1)	—	**Citi Field** (28,448)	71–39
111	August 9	Reds	6–2	**Carrasco** (13–4)	Minor (1–9)	—	**Citi Field** (30,816)	72–39
112	August 10	Reds	10–2	**Walker** (10–3)	Zeuch (0–1)	—	**Citi Field** (36,883)	73–39
113	August 12	Phillies	1–2 (10)	Domínguez (6–3)	**Givens** (6–3)	Robertson (16)	**Citi Field** (38,467)	73–40
114	August 13	Phillies	1–0	**deGrom** (2–0)	Nola (8–9)	**Díaz** (27)	**Citi Field** (43,857)	74–40
115	August 14	Phillies	6–0	**Bassitt** (10–7)	Wheeler (11–6)	—	**Citi Field** (40,513)	75–40
116	August 15	@ Braves	1–13	Strider (7–4)	**Carrasco** (13–5)	—	Truist Park (38,380)	75–41
117	August 16	@ Braves	0–5	Morton (6–5)	**Alvarez** (0–1)	—	Truist Park (37,449)	75–42
118	August 17	@ Braves	9–7	**Scherzer** (9–2)	Odorizzi (4–5)	—	Truist Park (34,308)	76–42
119	August 18	@ Braves	2–3	Fried (11–4)	**deGrom** (2–1)	Jansen (28)	Truist Park (39,378)	76–43
120	August 19	@ Phillies	7–2	**Bassitt** (11–7)	Nola (8–10)	—	Citizens Bank Park (43,176)	77–43
121	August 20 (1)	@ Phillies	8–2	**Lugo** (3–2)	Wheeler (11–7)	—	Citizens Bank Park (36,809)	78–43
122	August 20 (2)	@ Phillies	1–4	Falter (1–3)	**Peterson** (6–3)	Robertson (17)	Citizens Bank Park (39,374)	78–44
123	August 21	@ Phillies	10–9	**May** (2–0)	Robertson (3–1)	**Díaz** (28)	Citizens Bank Park (35,801)	79–44
124	August 22	@ Yankees	2–4	Germán (2–2)	**Scherzer** (9–3)	Loáisiga (1)	Yankee Stadium (48,760)	79–45
125	August 23	@ Yankees	2–4	Schmidt (5–2)	**Rodríguez** (0–3)	Peralta (2)	Yankee Stadium (49,217)	79–46
126	August 25	Rockies	3–1	**deGrom** (3–1)	Feltner (2–5)	**Ottavino** (1)	**Citi Field** (37,377)	80–46
127	August 26	Rockies	7–6	**Díaz** (3–1)	Bard (3–4)	—	**Citi Field** (32,447)	81–46
128	August 27	Rockies	3–0	**Peterson** (7–3)	Freeland (7–9)	**Ottavino** (2)	**Citi Field** (42,617)	82–46
129	August 28	Rockies	0–1	Márquez (7–10)	**Scherzer** (9–4)	Bard (27)	**Citi Field** (36,396)	82–47
130	August 30	Dodgers	3–4	Hembree (3–0)	**Rodríguez** (0–4)	Reed (1)	**Citi Field** (40,607)	82–48
131	August 31	Dodgers	2–1	**deGrom** (4–1)	Anderson (13–3)	**Díaz** (29)	**Citi Field** (41,799)	83–48

September: 15–11 (Home: 7–6; Away: 8–5)

#	Date	Opponent	Box Score	Win	Loss	Save	Location (Attendance)	Record
132	September 1	Dodgers	5–3	**Bassitt** (12–7)	Martin (4–1)	**Ottavino** (3)	**Citi Field** (36,908)	84–48
133	September 2	Nationals	7–3	**Givens** (7–3)	Gray (7–9)	—	**Citi Field** (33,630)	85–48
134	September 3	Nationals	1–7	Corbin (6–17)	**Ottavino** (5–3)	—	**Citi Field** (33,509)	85–49
135	September 4	Nationals	1–7	Fedde (6–9)	**Carrasco** (13–6)	—	**Citi Field** (31,711)	85–50
—	September 5	@ Pirates	Postponed (rain); rescheduled for September 7					
136	September 6	@ Pirates	2–8	Keller (5–10)	**Walker** (10–4)	—	PNC Park (8,817)	85–51
137	September 7 (1)	@ Pirates	5–1	**Bassitt** (13–7)	Underwood Jr. (1–6)	—	PNC Park (8,717)	86–51
138	September 7 (2)	@ Pirates	10–0	**deGrom** (5–1)	Oviedo (2–2)	—	PNC Park (9,824)	87–51
139	September 9	@ Marlins	3–6	Cabrera (5–2)	**Peterson** (7–4)	Floro (4)	LoanDepot Park (12,692)	87–52
140	September 10	@ Marlins	11–3	**Carrasco** (14–6)	López (8–10)	—	LoanDepot Park (17,441)	88–52
141	September 11	@ Marlins	9–3	**Walker** (11–4)	Luzardo (3–7)	—	LoanDepot Park (13,234)	89–52
142	September 12	Cubs	2–5	Assad (1–1)	**Bassitt** (13–8)	Hughes (5)	**Citi Field** (28,081)	89–53
143	September 13	Cubs	1–4	Sampson (2–5)	**deGrom** (5–2)	—	**Citi Field** (26,435)	89–54
144	September 14	Cubs	3–6	Smyly (7–8)	**Peterson** (7–5)	Leiter Jr. (2)	**Citi Field** (28,522)	89–55
145	September 15	Pirates	7–1	**Carrasco** (15–6)	Brubaker (3–12)	—	**Citi Field** (25,683)	90–55
146	September 16	Pirates	4–3	**Walker** (12–4)	Keller (5–11)	**Díaz** (30)	**Citi Field** (28,928)	91–55
147	September 17	Pirates	5–1	**Bassitt** (14–8)	Wilson (3–9)	—	**Citi Field** (40,111)	92–55
148	September 18	Pirates	7–3	**Rodríguez** (1–4)	Stephenson (2–2)	—	**Citi Field** (36,291)	93–55
149	September 19	@ Brewers	7–2	**Scherzer** (10–4)	Burnes (10–8)	—	American Family Field (25,671)	94–55
150	September 20	@ Brewers	7–5	**Rodríguez** (2–4)	Rogers (4–8)	**Díaz** (31)	American Family Field (26,319)	95–55
151	September 21	@ Brewers	0–6	Gott (3–2)	**Walker** (12–5)	—	American Family Field (25,204)	95–56
152	September 23	@ Athletics	9–2	**Bassitt** (15–8)	Irvin (9–12)	—	Oakland Coliseum (18,107)	96–56
153	September 24	@ Athletics	4–10	Waldichuk (1–2)	**deGrom** (5–3)	—	Oakland Coliseum (16,041)	96–57
154	September 25	@ Athletics	13–4	**Scherzer** (11–4)	Sears (6–3)	—	Oakland Coliseum (13,942)	97–57
155	September 27	Marlins	4–6	López (10–10)	**Carrasco** (15–7)	Floro (8)	**Citi Field** (29,067)	97–58
156	September 28	Marlins	5–4 (10)	**Smith** (3–3)	Floro (1–3)	—	**Citi Field** (28,228)	98–58
157	September 30	@ Braves	2–5	Fried (14–7)	**deGrom** (5–4)	Jansen (38)	Truist Park (42,402)	98–59

October: 3–2 (Home: 3–0; Away: 0–2)

#	Date	Opponent	Box Score	Win	Loss	Save	Location (Attendance)	Record
158	October 1	@ Braves	2–4	Wright (21–5)	**Scherzer** (11–5)	Jansen (39)	Truist Park (42,561)	98–60
159	October 2	@ Braves	3–5	Lee (5–1)	**Bassitt** (15–9)	Jansen (40)	Truist Park (42,713)	98–61
—	October 3	Nationals	Postponed (rain); rescheduled for October 4					
160	October 4 (1)	Nationals	4–2	**Ottavino** (6–3)	Abbott (0–5)	**Díaz** (32)	**Citi Field** (N/A)	99–61
161	October 4 (2)	Nationals	8–0	**Nogosek** (1–1)	Espino (0–9)	—	**Citi Field** (23,649)	100–61
162	October 5	Nationals	9–2	**Williams** (3–5)	Fedde (6–13)	—	**Citi Field** (27,298)	101–61

== Postseason ==
=== Game log ===
2022 postseason game log
Overall: 1–2 (Home: 1–2; Away: 0–0)
NL Wild Card Series: 1–2 (Home: 1–2; Away: 0–0)

#	Date	Opponent	Box Score	Win	Loss	Save	Location (Attendance)	Record
1	October 7	Padres	1–7	Darvish (1–0)	Scherzer (0–1)	—	Citi Field (41,621)	0–1
2	October 8	Padres	7–3	deGrom (1–0)	Martinez (0–1)	Lugo (1)	Citi Field (42,156)	1–1
3	October 9	Padres	0–6	Musgrove (1–0)	Bassitt (0–1)	—	Citi Field (39,241)	1–2

=== Postseason rosters ===
Playoff rosters
National League Wild Card Series

- Pitchers: 0 Adam Ottavino 21 Max Scherzer 23 David Peterson 30 Joely Rodríguez (Game 1) 38 Tylor Megill 39 Edwin Díaz 40 Chris Bassitt 48 Jacob deGrom 60 Mychal Givens 62 Drew Smith 65 Trevor May 67 Seth Lugo 99 Taijuan Walker (Games 2–3)
- Catchers: 3 Tomás Nido 33 James McCann 50 Francisco Álvarez
- Infielders: 1 Jeff McNeil 10 Eduardo Escobar 12 Francisco Lindor 13 Luis Guillorme 20 Pete Alonso
- Outfielders: 4 Terrance Gore 6 Starling Marte 9 Brandon Nimmo 19 Mark Canha
- Designated hitters: 28 Darin Ruf 32 Daniel Vogelbach

== Season notes ==
=== April ===
On April 29, during a game against the Philadelphia Phillies, the Mets pitchers threw a combined no-hitter, the first in the team's history. With 159 pitches, starting pitcher Tylor Megill, along with relief pitchers Drew Smith, Joely Rodríguez, Seth Lugo and closer Edwin Díaz held batters to a total of 6 walks and 13 strikeouts. This milestone is the second no-hitter in franchise history (the first was a solo effort in 2012 by Johan Santana against the St. Louis Cardinals) and the 17th combined no-hitter in MLB history. This was the second no-hitter as a manager for Buck Showalter, previously as the manager of the New York Yankees when Jim Abbott pitched a no-hitter during the 1993 season.

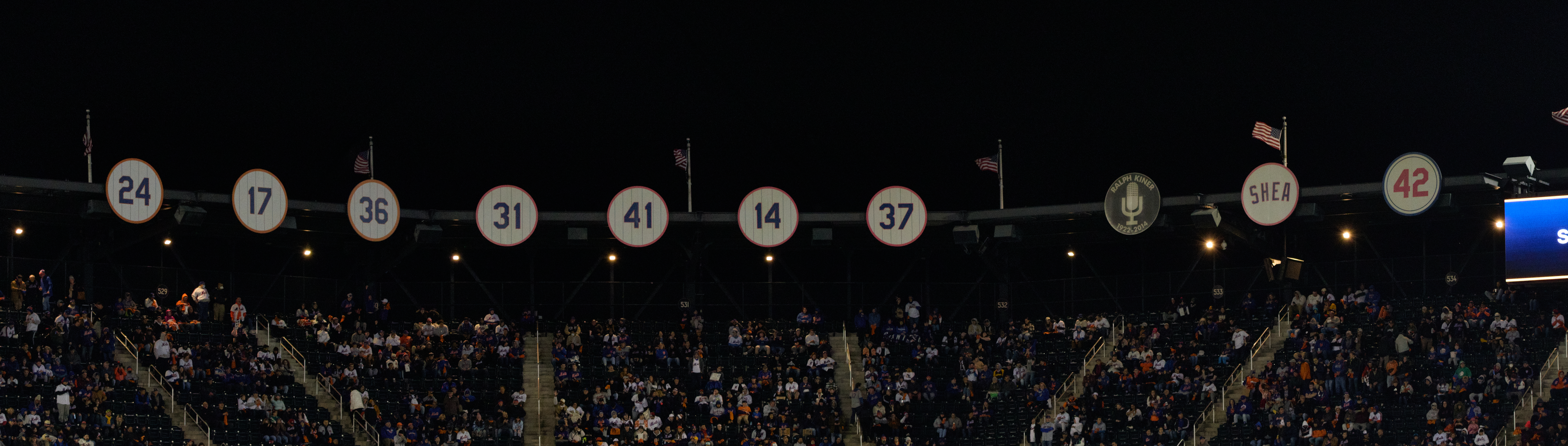

=== May ===
The Mets made franchise history with their biggest ninth-inning comeback in 25 years in a win over the Philadelphia Phillies on May 5. Down 7–1 entering the ninth inning, the Mets rallied with seven runs in the top of the inning to defeat the Phillies 8–7.

== Statistics ==
=== Batting ===
(Final statistics)
Team leaders are in bold.

- Indicates league leader.

Note: G = Games played; AB = At bats; R = Runs; H = Hits; 2B = Doubles; 3B = Triples; HR = Home runs; RBI = Runs batted in; SB = Stolen bases; BB = Walks; K = Strikeouts; Avg. = Batting average; OBP = On-base percentage; SLG = Slugging percentage; TB = Total bases

Player	G	AB	R	H	2B	3B	HR	RBI	SB	BB	K	AVG	OBP	SLG	TB
Pete Alonso	160	597	95	162	27	0	**40**	**131***	5	67	128	.271	.352	**.518**	**309**
Francisco Álvarez	5	12	3	2	1	0	1	1	0	2	4	.167	.286	.500	6
Brett Baty	11	38	4	7	0	0	2	5	0	2	8	.184	.244	.342	13
Travis Blankenhorn	1	3	0	0	0	0	0	0	0	0	1	.000	.000	.000	0
Mark Canha	140	462	71	123	24	0	13	61	3	48	97	.266	.367	.403	186
Robinson Canó	12	41	3	8	0	0	1	3	0	2	11	.195	.233	.268	11
J. D. Davis	66	181	26	43	8	1	4	21	1	20	66	.238	.324	.359	65
Eduardo Escobar	136	495	58	119	26	4	20	69	0	40	129	.240	.295	.430	213
Terrance Gore	10	7	1	1	0	0	0	0	3	0	3	.143	.143	.143	1
Luis Guillorme	102	297	33	81	12	1	2	17	1	34	46	.273	.351	.340	101
Ender Inciarte	11	8	1	1	0	0	0	0	0	0	0	.125	.125	.125	1
Travis Jankowski	43	54	11	9	0	0	0	2	3	8	9	.167	.286	.167	9
Khalil Lee	2	2	1	1	0	0	1	3	0	0	0	.500	.500	2.000	4
Francisco Lindor	**161**	**630**	98	170	25	5	26	107	16	59	**133**	.270	.339	.449	283
Deven Marrero	5	6	0	0	0	0	0	0	1	0	3	.000	.000	.000	0
Starling Marte	118	466	76	136	24	5	16	63	**18**	26	97	.292	.347	.468	218
Patrick Mazeika	24	68	4	13	4	0	1	6	0	2	9	.191	.214	.294	20
James McCann	61	174	19	34	6	0	3	17	3	11	46	.195	.257	.282	49
Jeff McNeil	148	533	73	**174**	**39**	1	9	62	4	40	61	**.326***	**.382**	.454	242
Tyler Naquin	49	123	18	25	7	2	4	13	1	6	40	.203	.246	.390	48
Tomás Nido	98	284	31	68	15	0	3	28	0	14	76	.239	.276	.324	92
Brandon Nimmo	151	580	**102**	159	30	**7**	16	64	3	**71**	116	.274	.367	.433	251
Michael Pérez	6	14	2	2	0	0	0	3	0	2	6	.143	.250	.143	2
Nick Plummer	14	29	4	4	1	0	2	6	0	1	12	.138	.194	.379	11
Matt Reynolds	1	0	0	0	0	0	0	0	0	0	0	.---	.---	.---	0
Darin Ruf	28	66	6	10	3	0	0	7	0	5	20	.152	.216	.197	13
Yolmer Sánchez	3	0	0	0	0	0	0	0	0	0	0	.---	.---	.---	0
Dominic Smith	58	134	11	26	10	1	0	17	0	12	37	.194	.276	.284	38
Mark Vientos	16	36	3	6	1	0	1	3	0	5	12	.167	.268	.278	10
Daniel Vogelbach	55	149	18	38	9	0	6	25	0	33	47	.255	.393	.436	65
**TEAM TOTALS**	162	5489	772	1422	272	27	171	735	62	510	1217	.259	.332	.412	2261

=== Pitching ===
(Final statistics)
Team leader are in bold.
Note: W = Wins; L = Losses; ERA = Earned run average; WHIP = Walks plus hits per inning pitched; G = Games pitched; GS = Games started; SV = Saves; IP = Innings pitched; H = Hits allowed; R = Runs allowed; ER = Earned runs allowed; BB = Walks allowed; K = Strikeouts

Player	W	L	ERA	WHIP	G	GS	SV	IP	H	R	ER	BB	K
R. J. Alvarez	0	1	11.57	3.00	1	0	0	2.1	4	3	3	3	2
Chris Bassitt	**15**	**9**	**3.42**	**1.15**	30	**30**	0	**181.2**	159	**71**	**69**	**49**	167
José Butto	0	0	15.75	2.75	1	1	0	4.0	9	7	7	2	5
Carlos Carrasco	**15**	7	3.97	1.33	29	29	0	152.0	**161**	**71**	67	41	152
Alex Claudio	0	0	0.00	0.90	3	0	0	3.1	1	0	0	2	2
Sam Clay	0	0	0.00	2.00	1	0	0	1.0	1	1	0	1	2
Jacob deGrom	5	4	3.08	0.75	11	11	0	64.1	40	22	22	8	102
Edwin Díaz	3	1	1.31	0.84	61	0	**32**	62.0	34	9	9	18	118
Nate Fisher	0	0	0.00	1.00	1	0	0	3.0	1	0	0	2	1
Mychal Givens	1	1	4.79	1.42	19	1	0	20.2	24	12	11	6	20
Colin Holderman	4	0	2.04	1.02	15	0	0	17.2	11	6	4	7	18
Tommy Hunter	0	1	2.42	1.21	18	0	0	22.1	21	8	6	6	22
Yoan López	1	0	5.73	1.73	8	0	0	11.0	14	8	7	5	10
Seth Lugo	3	2	3.60	1.17	62	0	3	65.0	58	26	26	18	69
Trevor May	2	0	5.04	1.44	26	0	1	25.0	27	14	14	9	30
Adonis Medina	1	0	6.08	1.52	14	0	1	23.2	30	18	16	6	17
Tylor Megill	4	2	5.13	1.25	15	9	0	47.1	46	27	27	13	51
Bryce Montes de Oca	0	0	10.80	2.70	3	0	0	3.1	7	4	4	2	6
Stephen Nogosek	1	1	2.45	1.23	12	0	0	22.0	20	10	6	7	21
Adam Ottavino	6	3	2.06	0.98	**66**	0	3	65.2	48	15	15	16	79
David Peterson	7	5	3.83	1.33	28	19	0	105.2	93	50	45	48	126
Jake Reed	1	0	11.37	1.58	5	0	0	6.1	4	8	8	6	6
Sean Reid-Foley	0	0	5.40	1.40	7	0	0	10.0	7	6	6	7	8
Joely Rodríguez	2	4	4.47	1.35	55	0	0	50.1	42	28	25	26	57
Darin Ruf	0	0	0.00	0.50	1	0	0	2.0	1	0	0	0	0
Max Scherzer	11	5	2.29	0.91	23	23	0	145.1	108	39	37	24	**173**
Chasen Shreve	1	1	6.49	1.41	25	0	0	26.1	27	19	19	10	29
Drew Smith	3	3	3.33	1.15	44	0	0	46.0	38	17	17	15	53
Thomas Szapucki	0	1	60.75	7.50	1	1	0	1.1	7	9	9	3	2
Taijuan Walker	12	5	3.49	1.20	29	29	0	157.1	143	63	61	45	132
Trevor Williams	3	5	3.21	1.23	30	9	1	89.2	87	32	32	23	84
Rob Zastryzny	0	0	9.00	1.00	1	0	0	1.0	1	1	1	0	1
**TEAM TOTALS**	101	61	3.57	1.18	162	162	41	1438.2	1274	606	570	428	1565

== Farm system ==
Level	Team	League	Manager
AAA	Syracuse Mets	International League	Kevin Boles
AA	Binghamton Rumble Ponies	Eastern League	Reid Brignac
High-A	Brooklyn Cyclones	South Atlantic League	Luis Rivera
Low-A	St. Lucie Mets	Florida State League	Robbie Robinson
Rookie	FCL Mets	Florida Complex League	David Davalillo
Rookie	DSL Mets 1	Dominican Summer League	Manny Martínez
Rookie	DSL Mets 2	Dominican Summer League	Yucary De La Cruz
