= Nate Fisher =

American baseball player (born 1996)

- Pitcher
- Born: May 28, 1996 (age 30); Omaha, Nebraska, U.S.
- Batted: Left Threw: Left

MLB debut
- August 21, 2022, for the New York Mets

Last MLB appearance
- August 21, 2022, for the New York Mets

MLB statistics
- Win–loss record: 0–0
- Earned run average: 0.00
- Strikeouts: 1
- Stats at Baseball Reference

Teams
- New York Mets (2022)

Nathan Charles Fisher (born May 28, 1996) is an American former professional baseball pitcher. He played one game in Major League Baseball (MLB) for the New York Mets in 2022.

== Amateur career ==
Fisher graduated from Yutan High School in Yutan, Nebraska, where he played basketball, football and baseball for the Chieftains. During his senior year in high school, Fisher led the football team in tackles. During his senior basketball season, the Chieftains were vying for their first state tournament berth since 1994, and eventually lost to Freeman High School.

Fisher attended the University of Nebraska–Lincoln and walked on to the college baseball team, playing for the Nebraska Cornhuskers as a pitcher. Fisher had Tommy John surgery in 2016. In 2019, his senior year, Fisher had a 3.27 earned run average and led all Cornhuskers pitchers in wins. He was not selected in the 2019 Major League Baseball draft.

== Professional career ==
=== Seattle Mariners ===
After Fisher graduated from Nebraska in 2019, the Seattle Mariners signed him to a minor league contract. He made his professional debut for the Everett AquaSox. That year, between his time with the AquaSox and the West Virginia Power, Fisher put up a 4.10 earned run average in 41 2/3 professional innings. The Mariners released Fisher in March 2020, during the COVID-19 pandemic shutdown. During this time, he completed his Master of Business Administration at Nebraska and worked as a commercial lending analyst for the First National Bank of Omaha.

Fisher was unsigned into 2021 and began coaching in Little League Baseball. In June 2021, the Mariners reached out to Fisher and signed him to a new minor league contract, at which point he quit his job at the bank. Fisher had a 2.89 earned run average in 37 1/3 innings pitched during the 2021 season, between the ACL Mariners, Everett AquaSox, Arkansas Travelers and Tacoma Rainiers. While pitching for the Travelers on August 2, he threw two innings of a combined no-hitter along with Matt Brash and Dayeison Arias. Fisher became a free agent after the season.

=== New York Mets ===
On November 28, 2021, Fisher signed a minor-league contract with the New York Mets. He began the 2022 season with the Binghamton Rumble Ponies, where he posted a 3.77 earned run average in 28 2/3 innings pitched, earning a promotion to the Syracuse Mets, for whom he posted a 3.12 earned run average in 43 1/3 innings pitched.

On August 21, the Mets selected Fisher's contract and promoted him to the major league roster. Entering in relief of José Butto, Fisher pitched three scoreless innings in his major league debut, a 10–9 Mets win against the Philadelphia Phillies on August 21, 2022. On August 22, Fisher was designated for assignment. He went unclaimed on waivers and the Mets sent him outright to Syracuse. Fisher elected free agency following the season on November 10.

=== Chicago White Sox ===
On November 15, 2022, Fisher signed a minor league deal with the Chicago White Sox, receiving a non-roster invitation to spring training with the White Sox in 2023. He made 26 appearances (20 starts) for the Triple–A Charlotte Knights, registering a 5–10 record and 6.51 ERA with 85 strikeouts across 103 2/3 innings pitched. Fisher elected free agency following the season on November 6, 2023.

On March 1, 2024, Fisher signed with the Sultanes de Monterrey of the Mexican League. He was released prior to the season on April 10. On May 23, Fisher revealed via Instagram that he had undergone season-ending elbow surgery.
