= Adonis Medina =

Dominican baseball player (born 1996)

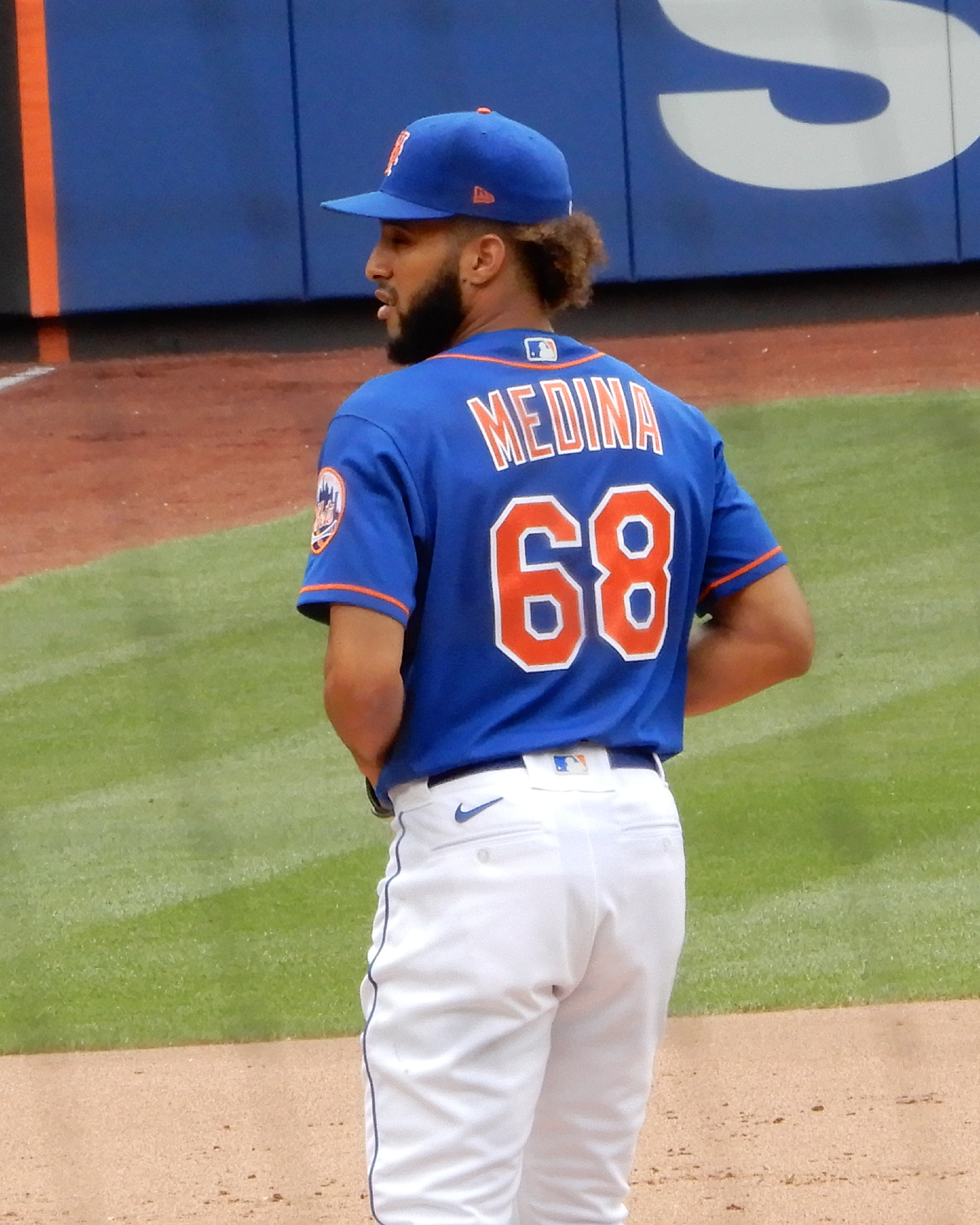
- Medina with the New York Mets in 2022

Toros de Tijuana – No. 18
- Pitcher
- Born: December 18, 1996 (age 29); Santo Domingo, Dominican Republic
- Bats: Right Throws: Right

Professional debut
- MLB: September 20, 2020, for the Philadelphia Phillies
- KBO: April 9, 2023, for the Kia Tigers

MLB statistics (through 2022 season)
- Win–loss record: 1–1
- Earned run average: 5.35
- Strikeouts: 27

KBO statistics (through 2023 season)
- Win–loss record: 2–6
- Earned run average: 6.05
- Strikeouts: 36
- Stats at Baseball Reference

Teams
- Philadelphia Phillies (2020–2021); New York Mets (2022); Kia Tigers (2023)

Adonis Medina Del Rosario (born December 18, 1996) is a Dominican professional baseball pitcher for the Toros de Tijuana of the Mexican League. He has previously played in Major League Baseball (MLB) for the Philadelphia Phillies and New York Mets, and in the KBO League for the Kia Tigers. He made his MLB debut in 2020.

== Baseball career ==
=== Philadelphia Phillies ===
==== Minor leagues ====
Medina was born in Santo Domingo, Dominican Republic. He signed with the Philadelphia Phillies as an international free agent on May 29, 2014. Medina made his professional debut that season with the Dominican Summer League Phillies and spent the whole season there, going 2–3 with a 1.37 earned run average (ERA) and 0.987 walks plus hits per inning pitched (WHIP), with 22 strikeouts in 26 2/3 innings pitched (IP).

Medina played in 2015 with the rookie-level Gulf Coast Phillies. He compiled a 3–2 record, 2.98 ERA, and 1.19 WHIP with 35 strikeouts in 45 1/3 innings of work. In 2016 with the Low–A Williamsport Crosscutters Medina had a 5–3 record, 2.92 ERA, and 1.098 WHIP, in 13 starts, and 34 strikeouts in 62 2/3 innings pitched. He was a 2016 mid-season New York-Penn League All Star.

Before the 2017 season, Baseball Prospectus ranked Medina the 91st-best minor league prospect. He spent 2017 with the Single–A Lakewood BlueClaws, In 22 starts, he was 4–9 with a 3.01 ERA (9th in the South Atlantic League), and 133 strikeouts (4th in the league) in 119 2/3 innings, averaging 10.0 strikeouts per 9 innings pitched.

Before the 2018 season, Baseball Prospectus ranked Medina the 46th-best prospect, Baseball America ranked him the 84th-best prospect, and MLB ranked him the 86th-best prospect. Medina pitched in 2018 for the High–A Clearwater Threshers, for whom he was 10–4 with a 4.12 ERA, with 123 strikeouts (3rd in the Florida State League) in 111 1/3 innings, averaging 9.97 strikeouts per 9 innings pitched. His 10 wins tied for 4th in the league. In July, Medina played in the All-Star Futures Game. He was Pitcher of the Week on both July 22 and August 19.

The Phillies added Medina to their 40-man roster on November 20, 2018, to protect him from the Rule 5 draft. Baseball Prospectus ranked him the 57th-best prospect in baseball, MLB Pipeline named him the 64th-best prospect, and MLB.com ranked him number 77. Baseball America named Medina the 4th-best prospect in the Phillies minor league system.

In 2019, pitching for the Reading Fightin Phils of the Double–A Eastern League, Medina was 7–7 with a 4.94 ERA in 105 2/3 innings over 22 appearances (21 starts), and was 2nd in the league with 14 hit batsmen. He was a mid-season Eastern League All-Star.

==== Major leagues ====
On September 20, 2020, Medina made his big league debut, as the Philadelphia Phillies' starting pitcher against the Toronto Blue Jays, at Citizens Bank Park. Medina was charged with the loss, giving up four hits and two earned runs over four innings pitched. He was optioned down, following the game.

Medina spent the majority of his 2021 season with the Triple–A Lehigh Valley IronPigs, making 17 starts and registering a 4–5 record and 5.05 ERA with 55 strikeouts in 67 2/3 innings pitched. In 4 major league games with the Phillies, he allowed 3 runs on 9 hits and 4 walks in 7 2/3 innings of work. On December 1, 2021, the Phillies designated Medina for assignment following the signing of Johan Camargo. The decision on Medina's designation was delayed due to the 2021–22 Major League Baseball lockout, which prompted a freeze on Major League transactions.

=== New York Mets ===
Following the end of the lockout, Medina was claimed off of waivers by the Pittsburgh Pirates, on March 16, 2022. On April 7, he was designated for assignment and was subsequently traded to the New York Mets in exchange for cash and optioned to the Syracuse Mets of the Triple–A International League.

On June 5, he recorded his first career MLB save in the 10th inning of a 5–4 win against the Los Angeles Dodgers. In 14 games for the Mets, he posted a 6.08 ERA with 17 strikeouts and 1 save in 23 2/3 innings of work. On September 6, Medina was designated for assignment. He cleared waivers and was sent outright to Triple–A Syracuse on September 9. He elected free agency following the season on November 10.

=== Kia Tigers ===
On December 6, 2022, Medina signed a minor league deal with the Milwaukee Brewers organization. He was released on December 15, to formally sign overseas.

On December 11, 2022, Medina agreed to a contract with the Kia Tigers of the KBO League. Medina made 12 starts for Kia in 2023, but struggled to a 2–6 record and 6.05 ERA with 36 strikeouts in 58 innings pitched. On July 4, 2023, he was released by the Tigers following the signing of Mario Sanchez.

=== Washington Nationals ===
On February 2, 2024, Medina signed a minor league contract with the Washington Nationals. In 49 relief appearances for the Triple-A Rochester Red Wings, he compiled an 8–3 record, 3.76 ERA, and 60 strikeouts across 64 2/3 innings pitched. Medina elected free agency on November 4.

=== Seattle Mariners ===
On November 18, 2024, Medina signed a minor league contract with the Seattle Mariners. In 27 appearances for the Triple-A Tacoma Rainiers, he logged a 3–2 record and 5.03 ERA with 26 strikeouts over 34 innings of work. Medina was released by the Mariners organization on June 23, 2025.

=== Philadelphia Phillies (second stint) ===
On July 4, 2025, Medina signed a minor league contract with the Philadelphia Phillies. He made 10 appearances (seven starts) for the Triple-A Lehigh Valley IronPigs, posting an 0–3 record and 3.41 ERA with 29 strikeouts across 31 2/3 innings pitched. Medina elected free agency following the season on November 6.

=== Toros de Tijuana ===
On May 3, 2026, Medina signed with the Toros de Tijuana of the Mexican League.
