= J. D. Davis =

American baseball player (born 1993)

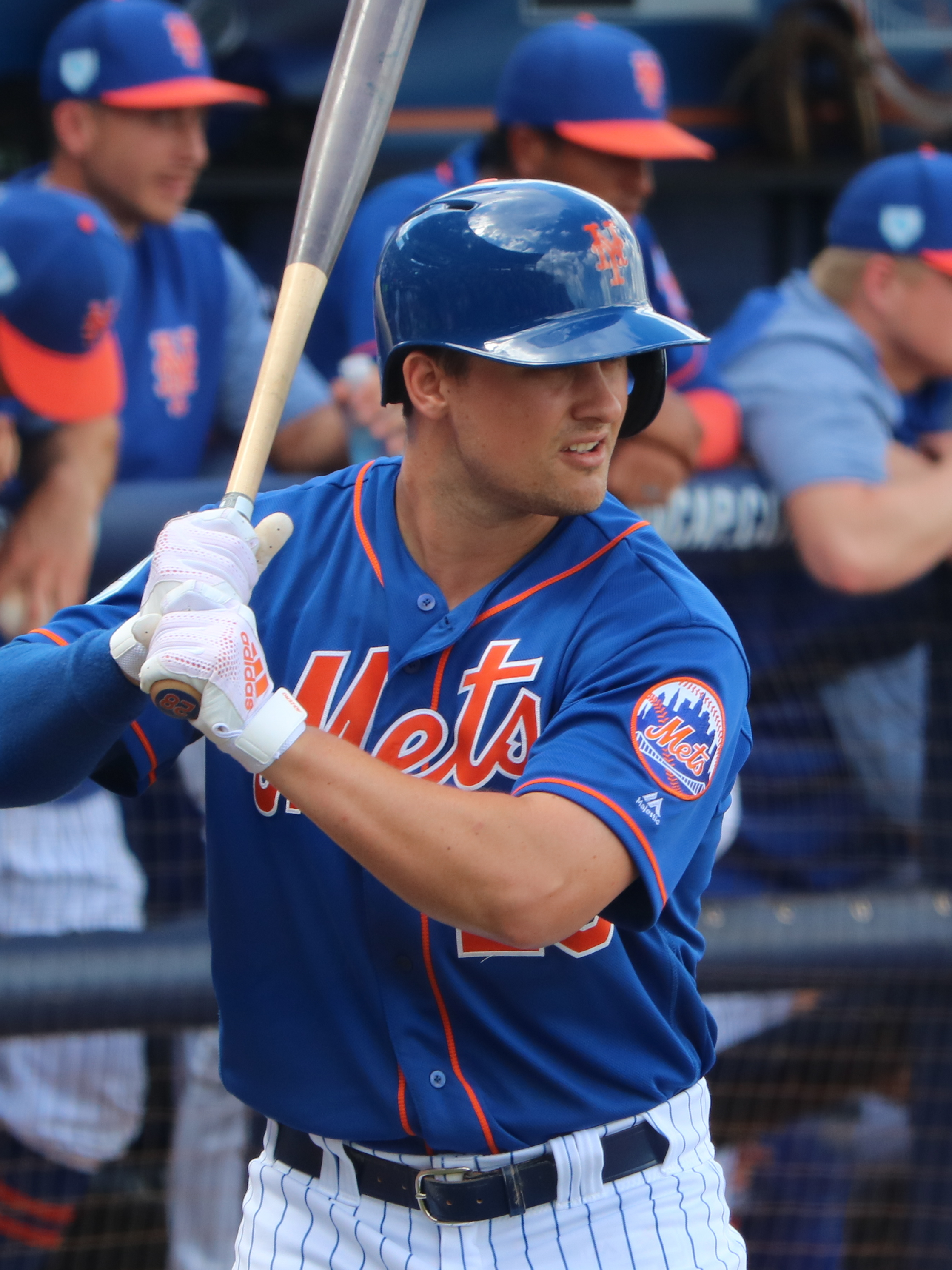
- Davis with the Mets in 2019

Kansas City Monarchs – No. 41
- Third baseman
- Born: April 27, 1993 (age 33); Elk Grove, California, U.S.
- Bats: Right Throws: Right

Professional debut
- MLB: August 5, 2017, for the Houston Astros
- NPB: July 18, 2025, for the Saitama Seibu Lions

MLB statistics (through 2025 season)
- Batting average: .257
- Home runs: 72
- Runs batted in: 221

NPB statistics (through 2025 season)
- Batting average: .204
- Home runs: 3
- Runs batted in: 9
- Stats at Baseball Reference

Teams
- Houston Astros (2017–2018); New York Mets (2019–2022); San Francisco Giants (2022–2023); Oakland Athletics (2024); New York Yankees (2024); Los Angeles Angels (2025); Saitama Seibu Lions (2025)

Jonathan Gregory "J.D." Davis (born April 27, 1993) is an American professional baseball third baseman for the Kansas City Monarchs of the American Association of Professional Baseball. He has previously played in Major League Baseball (MLB) for the Houston Astros, New York Mets, San Francisco Giants, Oakland Athletics, New York Yankees, and Los Angeles Angels and in Nippon Professional Baseball (NPB) for the Saitama Seibu Lions. Davis played college baseball at California State University, Fullerton, and was drafted by the Astros in the third round of the 2014 MLB draft. He made his MLB debut in 2017 with the Astros.

== Amateur career ==
Davis attended Elk Grove High School in Elk Grove, California. He played first base, third base, and pitched, and batted .444, .337, .486, and .505 from 2008 to 2011. As a pitcher, in 165 career innings pitched, he struck out 219 batters and never had an earned run average (ERA) above 2.60. He was a four-time All-Delta Valley Conference, three-time All-Metro, and two-time high school All-American and Northern California Player of the Year. He also played football as a quarterback and placekicker while a sophomore in 2008, and was all-league; the following year he broke his leg in a pre-season scrimmage.

The Tampa Bay Rays selected Davis in the fifth round of the 2011 Major League Baseball draft. Davis did not sign and attended California State University, Fullerton, where he played college baseball for the Cal State Fullerton Titans from 2012 to 2014. Davis played right field and first base and was also a pitcher, as a closer. In 2012, he played collegiate summer baseball for the Wisconsin Woodchucks of the Northwest League, batted .344 and was 4–0 with a 2.10 ERA, was named a summer All-American as utility player by Perfect Game, and had his season end early when he suffered a broken clavicle in a head-on auto collision in Wisconsin on July 19. In 2013, he played summer baseball for the Chatham Anglers of the Cape Cod Baseball League (CCBL), where he batted .311/.402/.447. Davis was named the East Division most valuable player of the league's all-star game and was named to the 2013 Cape Cod All-League Team.

In 2013, as a sophomore, Davis was third in the Big West Conference with 50 runs batted in (RBIs) and fourth with 41 walks, and was named to the Fullerton All-Regional Team and Big West Conference First Team. In 2014, as a junior, he was second in the conference with a .523 slugging percentage, third with 16 doubles and five triples, fourth with 32 walks, eighth with 43 RBIs, and ninth with a .419 on-base percentage. In his three years with the Titans, he hit .307/.394/.461 with 14 home runs and 113 RBIs in 156 games. As a pitcher he had a 5–5 win–loss record with a 2.94 ERA and 11 saves in 36 games (8 starts).

== Professional career ==
=== Houston Astros ===
After his junior season in college, Davis was drafted by the Houston Astros in the third round of the 2014 Major League Baseball draft. He signed with the Astros for a signing bonus of $748,600 and made his professional debut with the Tri-City ValleyCats. After hitting .293/.371/.508 with a .878 on-base plus slugging (OPS) in 111 at bats over 30 games, he was promoted to the Quad Cities River Bandits of the Single–A Midwest League, where he finished the 2014 season, batting .303/.363/.516(9th in the Midwest League) with eight home runs and 32 RBIs in 155 at bats. He was named an MiLB Organization All Star.

In 2015, he played for the Lancaster JetHawks of the High–A California League. There Davis slashed .289/.370/.520 with 93 runs (3rd in the league), 26 home runs (6th), 101 RBIs (2nd in the league, behind Cody Bellinger, and 6th among all minor league batters), 54 walks (3rd), 157 strikeouts (3rd), 12 grounded into double plays (4th), and 10 hit by pitch (2nd). He then played for the Glendale Desert Dogs in the Arizona Fall league, batting .279/.329/.456 with 6 doubles (6th in the AFL) in 68 at bats, and was named an AFL Rising Star.

In 2016, Davis played for the Corpus Christi Hooks of the Double–A Texas League. There, he led the league with 34 doubles and batted .268/.334/.485(10th in the Texas League) with 61 runs (8th), 23 home runs (3rd), 81 RBIs (3rd), and 45 walks (8th), and 143 strikeouts (3rd). He was named a mid-season All Star and an MiLB Organization All Star.

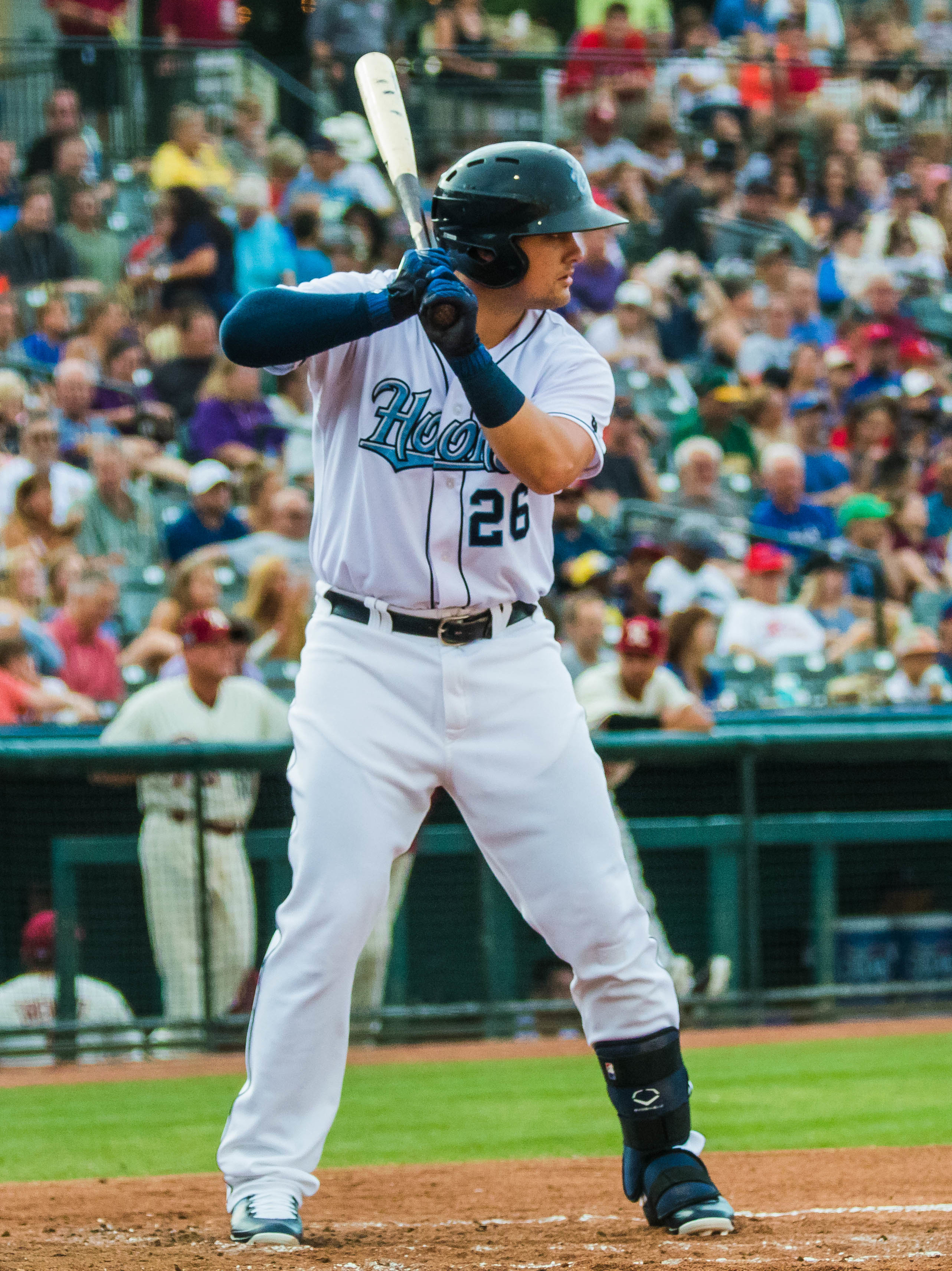
Davis in the 2017 Texas League All Star Game

Davis began 2017 back with Corpus Christi, batting .279/.340/.510(leading the Texas League) with 21 home runs (2nd), and 60 RBIs. He was promoted to the Fresno Grizzlies of the Triple–A Pacific Coast League in July where he batted .295/.370/.623 with five home runs, 18 RBIs, and a .993 OPS in 16 games. He was named a Texas League mid-season and post-season All Star, and an MiLB Organization All Star.

The Astros promoted Davis to the major leagues on August 5, 2017. He played 25 games with the Astros with 62 at bats, batting .226/.279/.484 with four home runs, and seven RBIs. The Astros finished the year with a 101–61 record, and eventually won the 2017 World Series. Davis did not play in the playoffs, but was still on the Astros' 40-man roster, giving him a chance to win his first career championship.

On March 24, 2018, the Astros announced that Davis had made the Opening Day roster. He batted .175/.248/.223 with one home run in 103 at bats for the Astros. He batted .342(winning the Pacific Coast League batting title)/.406/.583(6th) with 17 home runs with 81 RBIs (6th) for Fresno in 333 at bats. He was named to the mid-season Pacific Coast League All Star team, and was named an MiLB Organization All Star for the fourth time.

=== New York Mets ===
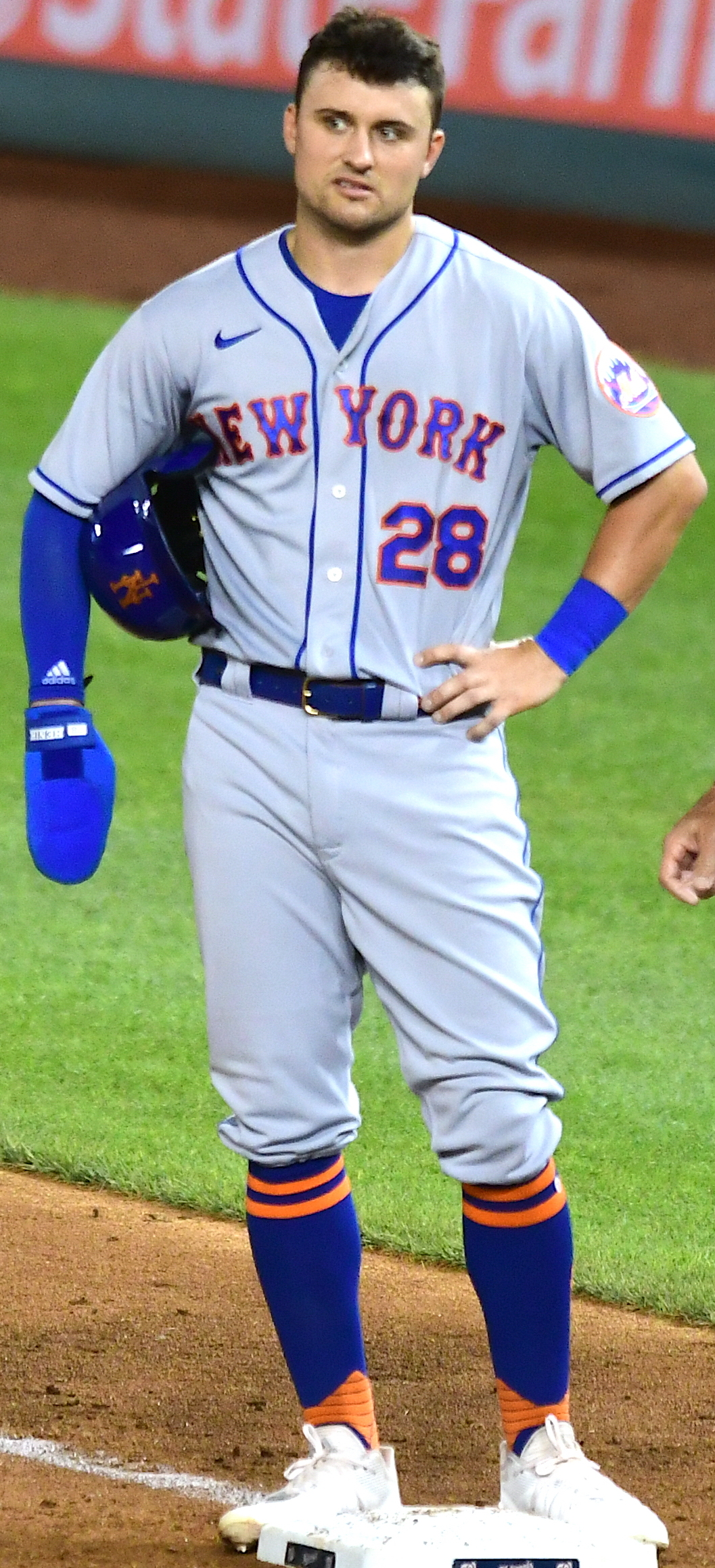
Davis in action with Mets in 2020

On January 6, 2019, the Astros traded Davis and Cody Bohanek to the New York Mets for Ross Adolph, Luis Santana, and Scott Manea. On August 26, Davis was awarded with the MLB Play of the Week with an over-the-shoulder basket catch by MLB.com. He finished the 2019 season batting .307/.369/.527 with career-highs in home runs (22) and RBI (57) in 140 games. He was in the top 5% in MLB in average exit velocity, at 91.5 mph, and maximum exit velocity, at 114.7 mph. His four assists were the 5th-most for an NL left fielder. In the field, he played 79 games in left field, and 31 games at third base.

Davis played in 56 games for the Mets in 2020, slashing .247/.371/.389 with six home runs and 19 RBI. The eight double plays he grounded into were 5th-most in the National League, and his seven hit by pitch were 6th-most in the league. In the field, he played 34 games at third base, and 11 in left field.

On June 25, 2021, Davis was placed on the 60-day injured list with a left hand sprain; ultimately, in October he had surgery to repair a left hand ligament. On July 16, Davis was activated off of the injured list. In 38 at bats with the Triple–A Syracuse Mets, he batted .316/.469/.737. In 2021 with the Mets he batted .285/.384/.436. He batted .429 as a pinch hitter, the second-best batting average in the majors of those with 20 or more plate appearances. In the field, he played all his games at third base.

On March 22, 2022, Davis signed a $2.76 million contract with the Mets, avoiding salary arbitration. In 2022 with the Mets, before he was traded, he batted .238/.324/.359 with four home runs and 21 RBI, in 181 at bats. He played 43 games at DH, 12 at third base, and four at first base.

=== San Francisco Giants ===
On August 2, 2022, Davis and pitchers Carson Seymour, Nick Zwack, and Thomas Szapucki were traded to the San Francisco Giants for first baseman/outfielder Darin Ruf. With the Giants after the trade, he batted .263/.361/.496 in 137 at bats, with 20 runs, 8 home runs, and 14 RBIs. He played 18 games at third base, 14 each at first base and DH, and 2 in left field. In 2022 he was third-best in the major leagues in hard-hit percentage (56.1%, behind Aaron Judge and Yordan Alvarez), and in the top 5% in MLB in barrel percentage, and average exit velocity on balls hit (92.4 mph). On January 13, 2023, Davis agreed to a one-year, $4.21 million contract with the Giants, avoiding salary arbitration. He played in 144 games for the Giants, batting .248/.325/.413 with 18 home runs and a career–high 69 RBIs.

On February 8, 2024, Davis won his arbitration hearing and his contract was increased to $6.9 million for the year. On March 11, Davis was released by the Giants and became a free agent. Because his contract was imposed by an arbitrator and not agreed to by the club, by releasing him the Giants owed Davis just $1.1 million of his contract.

=== Oakland Athletics ===
On March 16, 2024, Davis signed a one-year, $2.5 million contract with the Oakland Athletics. In 39 games for Oakland, he batted .236/.304/.366 with four home runs and five RBIs. On June 18, Davis was designated for assignment by the Athletics.

=== New York Yankees ===
On June 23, 2024, the Athletics traded Davis and cash considerations to the New York Yankees in exchange for Jordan Groshans. In seven games for New York, he went 2–for–19 (.105) with one RBI and three walks. On July 28, Davis was designated for assignment by the Yankees. He was released by the organization on August 2.

=== Baltimore Orioles ===
On August 7, 2024, Davis signed a minor league contract with the Baltimore Orioles. In 31 games for the Triple-A Norfolk Tides, he batted .147/.219/.248 with three home runs and nine RBI. Davis elected free agency following the season on November 4.

=== Los Angeles Angels ===
On January 24, 2025, Davis signed a minor league contract with the Los Angeles Angels. In 10 games for the Triple-A Salt Lake Bees, he batted .297/.357/.487 with two home runs and 11 RBI. On April 10, the Angels selected Davis' contract, adding him to their active roster. In five games for the Angels, he went 1-for-9 (.111). Davis was designated for assignment by Los Angeles on April 29. He cleared waivers and elected free agency on May 1, but re-signed with the Angels on a minor league contract the following day. Davis was released by the Angels organization on June 30.

=== Saitama Seibu Lions ===
On July 10, 2025, Davis signed a contract with the Saitama Seibu Lions of Nippon Professional Baseball. He made 36 appearances for the Lions, slashing .204/.313/.310 with three home runs and nine RBI. Davis became a free agent following the season.

=== Tecolotes de los Dos Laredos ===
On March 22, 2026, Davis signed with the Tecolotes de los Dos Laredos of the Mexican League In 42 appearances for the team, he batted .220/.324/.200 with three home runs and 15 RBI. On June 10, Davis was released by Dos Laredos.

=== Kansas City Monarchs ===
On June 22, 2026, Davis signed with the Kansas City Monarchs of the American Association of Professional Baseball.
