= Carson Seymour =

American baseball player (born 1998)

San Francisco Giants – No. 77
- Pitcher
- Born: December 16, 1998 (age 27); Poway, California, U.S.
- Bats: Right Throws: Right

MLB debut
- June 29, 2025, for the San Francisco Giants

MLB statistics (through 2026 season)
- Win–loss record: 1–5
- Earned run average: 4.66
- Strikeouts: 49
- Stats at Baseball Reference

Teams
- San Francisco Giants (2025–present)

Carson James Seymour (born December 16, 1998) is an American professional baseball pitcher for the San Francisco Giants of Major League Baseball (MLB). He made his MLB debut in 2025.

== Career ==
=== Amateur ===
Seymour attended Great Oak High School in Temecula, California and played college baseball at Dartmouth College and Kansas State University. In 2019, he played collegiate summer baseball with the Harwich Mariners of the Cape Cod Baseball League. In 2020, he played with the Rockford Rivets of the Northwoods League in a COVID-19 pandemic-restricted pod circuit.

=== New York Mets ===
Seymour was drafted by the New York Mets in the sixth round, with the 172nd overall selection, of the 2021 Major League Baseball draft. He made his professional debut in 2021 with the rookie-level Florida Complex League Mets.

Seymour began the 2022 campaign with the Single-A St. Lucie Mets, posting a 4-0 record and 1.19 ERA with 27 strikeouts in seven games (four starts). Following a promotion to the High-A Brooklyn Cyclones, he logged a 1-5 record and 3.68 ERA with 65 strikeouts over 11 games (nine starts).

=== San Francisco Giants ===
On August 2, 2022, the Mets traded Seymour, J. D. Davis, Thomas Szapucki, and Nick Zwack to the San Francisco Giants in exchange for Darin Ruf. He started his Giants career with the High-A Eugene Emeralds. In 2023, Seymour pitched for the Double-A Richmond Flying Squirrels, registering a 5-3 record and 3.99 ERA with 114 strikeouts in 112 2/3 innings pitched across 28 appearances (23 starts).

Seymour spent the 2024 campaign with the Triple–A Sacramento River Cats, making 29 appearances (28 starts) and posting a 7–10 record and 4.82 ERA with 132 strikeouts across 134 1/3 innings pitched. Following the season, the Giants added Seymour to their 40-man roster to protect him from the Rule 5 draft.

Seymour was optioned to Triple-A Sacramento to begin the 2025 season. In 15 starts for the River Cats, he compiled a 3–8 record and 3.89 ERA with 83 strikeouts over 74 innings of work. On June 27, 2025, Seymour was promoted to the major leagues for the first time. He made his MLB debut on June 29. On September 5, Seymour recorded his first career win, allowing one run over five innings pitched against the St. Louis Cardinals. Seymour made 16 appearances (three starts) for San Francisco during his rookie campaign, in which he posted a 1–3 record and 4.75 ERA with 26 strikeouts over 36 innings.

Seymour was again optioned to Triple-A Sacramento to begin the 2026 season.

== Personal life ==
Seymour married Sydney Campbell in 2024. They have a white Labrador retriever named Goose.
