= Nick Plummer =

American baseball player (born 1996)

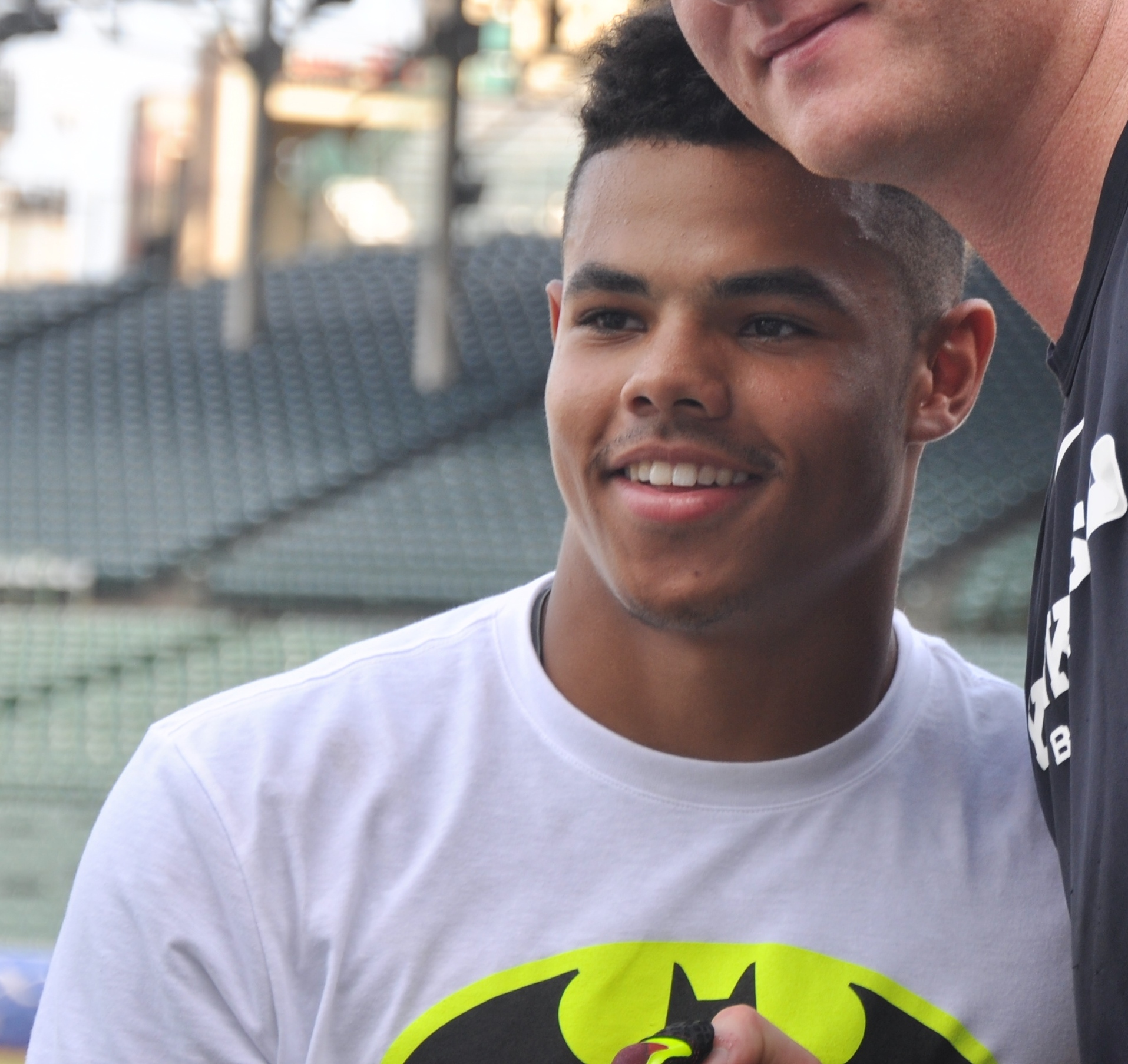
- Plummer in 2014
- Outfielder
- Born: July 31, 1996 (age 29); Lathrup Village, Michigan, U.S.
- Batted: Left Threw: Left

MLB debut
- April 15, 2022, for the New York Mets

Last MLB appearance
- June 19, 2022, for the New York Mets

MLB statistics
- Batting average: .138
- Home runs: 2
- Runs batted in: 6
- Stats at Baseball Reference

Teams
- New York Mets (2022)

Nicholas Raymond Plummer (born July 31, 1996) is an American former professional baseball outfielder. He played in Major League Baseball (MLB) for the New York Mets.

Plummer attended Brother Rice High School in Bloomfield Hills, Michigan, and was selected by the St. Louis Cardinals with the 23rd overall selection in the 2015 MLB draft. He spent seven years in their minor league system before signing with the Mets as a free agent in 2021.

== Amateur career ==
Plummer attended Brother Rice High School in Bloomfield Hills, Michigan. Plummer became a starter on the varsity baseball team his freshman year. As a junior, he batted .573 with eight home runs and 34 runs batted in (RBIs). In 2015, the American Baseball Coaches Association named him the National Player of the Year among high schoolers. Plummer committed to the University of Kentucky to play college baseball.

== Professional career ==
=== St. Louis Cardinals ===
Plummer was considered one of the top prospects for the 2015 Major League Baseball draft and was selected 23rd overall by the St. Louis Cardinals. He signed on June 15, for a $2.124 million bonus. He spent his entire first season in minor leagues with the Rookie-level Gulf Coast League Cardinals, playing in 51 games and batting .228 with eight doubles, one home run and 22 RBIs. Prior to the 2016 season, Baseball America ranked him as the eighth-best prospect in the Cardinals' system. He missed the entire 2016 season after surgery on his hand. He returned in 2017, playing for the Peoria Chiefs of the Class A Midwest League, posting a .198 batting average with four home runs and 17 RBIs in 92 games.

Plummer returned to Peoria in 2018, batting .205 with eight home runs and thirty RBIs in 104 games. In 2019, he played for the Palm Beach Cardinals of the Class A-Advanced Florida State League, slashing .176/.312/.294 with five home runs and 29 RBIs over 96 games. Covid canceled 2020.

Plummer began the 2021 season with the Springfield Cardinals of the Double-A Central. On July 8, he hit three home runs, including a two run walk-off, in a game against the Tulsa Drillers, becoming the second Springfield player ever (alongside Nolan Gorman) to hit three home runs in a single regular season game. St. Louis named him their Player of the Month for July after hitting .326 with six home runs, five doubles, one triple and 21 RBIs while reaching base safely in all 24 games for the month. On August 7, he set a Springfield record after reaching base in his 33rd straight game, passing Tommy Edman who reached 32 straight times in 2018. On August 23, after slashing .283/.404/.489 with 13 home runs, 46 RBIs, and 17 doubles over ninety games, he was promoted to the Memphis Redbirds of the Triple-A East. Following the season’s end, after not being added to the Cardinals’ 40-man roster, Plummer elected free agency.

=== New York Mets ===
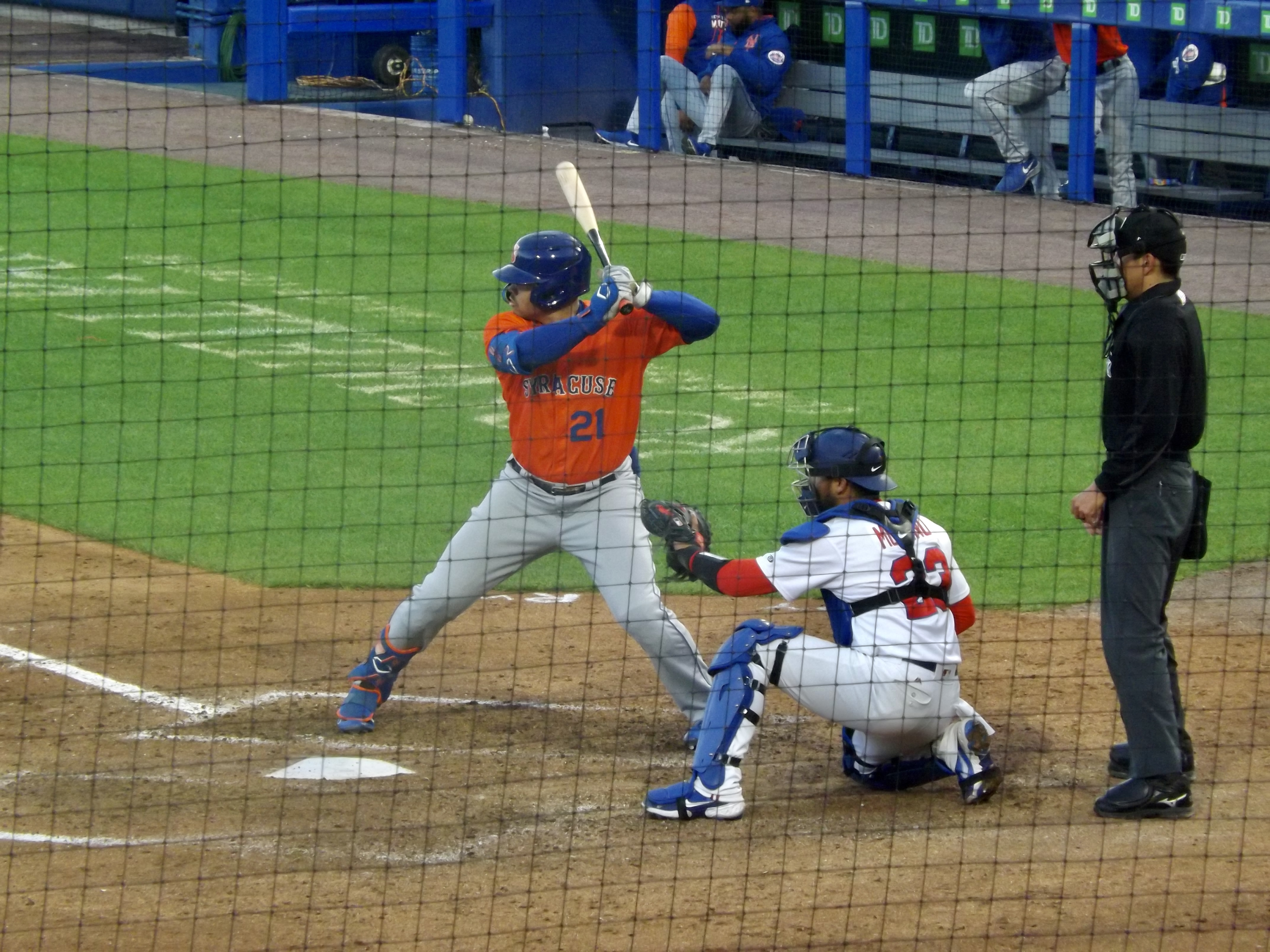
Plummer batting for the Syracuse Mets, 2022

On November 24, 2021, Plummer signed a one-year, major league deal with the New York Mets. Plummer made his Major League debut with the Mets on April 15, 2022, at Citi Field against the Arizona Diamondbacks. He entered the game in the ninth inning as a defensive replacement for Starling Marte in right field. Two days later, he lined out against Matt Peacock in his first Major League plate appearance. On April 18, He was returned to the minor leagues when Brandon Nimmo returned from the injured list. Recalled on May 28, Plummer's first Major League hit was a game-tying bottom of the ninth home run against the Philadelphia Phillies on May 29. He became the 14th player in Mets history to hit a home run as their first career hit; the first since Jeremy Hefner during the 2012 season. After hitting a home run in his second straight game in a win against the Washington Nationals, Plummer became the first player in Mets history to hit a home run in each of his first two career starts. On August 16, 2022, Plummer was designated for assignment. He cleared waivers and was sent outright to the Triple-A Syracuse Mets on August 19. He elected free agency following the season on November 10.

=== Cincinnati Reds ===
On February 3, 2023, Plummer signed a minor league contract with the Cincinnati Reds organization. Plummer was released by the Reds on March 27.
