= Darin Ruf =

American baseball player (born 1986)

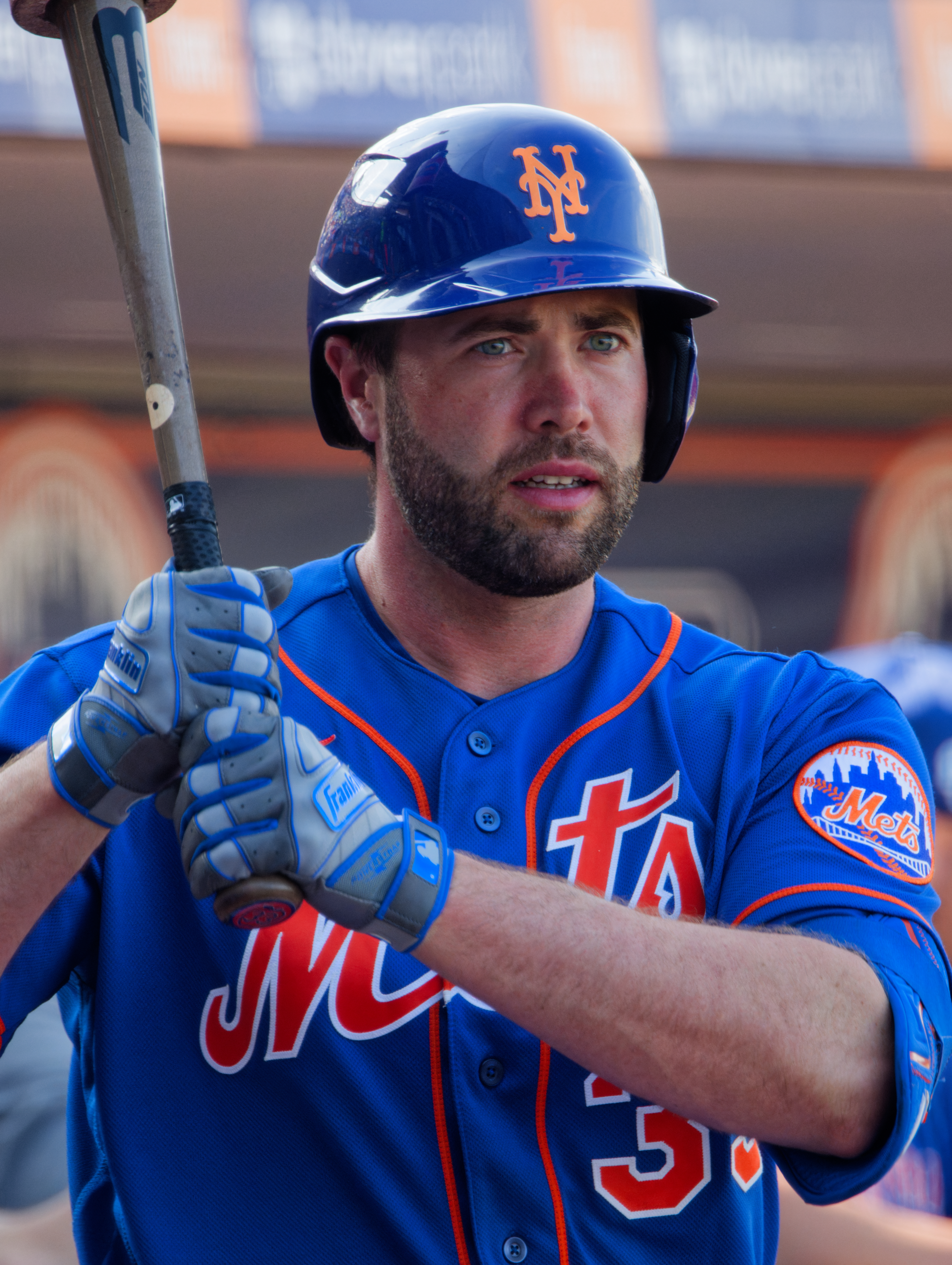
- Ruf with the Mets in 2023
- First baseman / Left fielder / Designated hitter
- Born: July 28, 1986 (age 40); Omaha, Nebraska, U.S.
- Batted: Right Threw: Right

Professional debut
- MLB: September 14, 2012, for the Philadelphia Phillies
- KBO: March 31, 2017, for the Samsung Lions

Last appearance
- MLB: June 2, 2023, for the Milwaukee Brewers
- KBO: September 29, 2019, for the Samsung Lions

MLB statistics
- Batting average: .239
- Home runs: 67
- Runs batted in: 205

KBO statistics
- Batting average: .315
- Home runs: 81
- Runs batted in: 321
- Stats at Baseball Reference

Teams
- Philadelphia Phillies (2012–2016); Samsung Lions (2017–2019); San Francisco Giants (2020–2022); New York Mets (2022); San Francisco Giants (2023); Milwaukee Brewers (2023)

Career highlights and awards
- KBO RBI leader (2017)

Darin Cortland Ruf (born July 28, 1986) is an American former professional baseball player. A first baseman, left fielder, and designated hitter, he played in Major League Baseball (MLB) for the Philadelphia Phillies, San Francisco Giants, New York Mets and Milwaukee Brewers. He also played in the KBO League for the Samsung Lions. Ruf was born in Omaha, Nebraska, and played at Westside High School. Subsequently, he attended Creighton University, excelled playing baseball there, and was named the 2007 Missouri Valley Conference (MVC) Player of the Year.

The Philadelphia Phillies drafted him in the 20th round of the 2009 Major League Baseball draft. In the minor leagues, he initially hit for a high batting average, but in 2011 combined that with power numbers to become one of the Phillies' top prospects. In 2012 he led the minor leagues (and the Eastern League) with 38 home runs, and was the Eastern League Most Valuable Player. He made his major league debut in 2012. In 2013, he split time between Triple-A and the major league Phillies. He was embroiled in a roster battle for a bench spot entering 2014, but hurt his oblique, and landed on the disabled list prior to the season. He remained with the Phillies for two more seasons, but by 2016 his time on the major league roster ended. He was traded to the Los Angeles Dodgers, but he did not play in any games before they sold his contract to the Samsung Lions of the KBO League.

Ruf spent three seasons in South Korea, and in 2017 he led the KBO in runs batted in. After two more successful seasons at the plate, he returned stateside and signed with the San Francisco Giants, with whom he earned a major league roster spot. The Giants traded him to the New York Mets during the 2022 season; he played for the Mets for the remainder of that season before being designated for assignment and released prior to the 2023 season.

== Early life and career ==
Ruf was born to parents Bill and Mary Ruf in Omaha, Nebraska; he has four siblings (one of whom is older, the rest younger). He attended Westside High School, where he helped the team win a Nebraska state championship his sophomore season and finish as the runner-up his senior year. He also played football and basketball, and was the captain of the baseball and football teams – during his senior season, he achieved all-state honors in both football and basketball.

After his senior season, he committed to play baseball at Creighton University for its "combination of athletics and academics"; there, he was a "standout" over his four seasons, serving as the squad's first baseman.

In Ruf's freshman season (2006), he started all 52 games. His sophomore season (2007) he was named the Missouri Valley Conference (MVC) Player of the Year, a member of both the first-team all conference squad, and a first-team all-conference scholar athlete. He also was named an all-star for his performance in summer collegiate baseball, during which he was a member of the Wisconsin Woodchucks of the Northwoods League. During his junior season (2008) he compiled a 15-game hitting streak that contributed to his .347 season batting average. After the 2008 season, he played collegiate summer baseball with the Falmouth Commodores of the Cape Cod Baseball League. His collegiate career culminated in 2009, when he was named to the second-team all-MVC team and a third-team academic-All American by ESPN. Overall, he was "all over the Bluejay record books, finishing first in home runs with 67, second in runs batted in (RBIs) with 205, third in total bases with 423 and in hits with 275, sixth in walks with 135, and seventh in doubles with 57 ... (he) started all 227 games in his career." While at Creighton, he earned a degree in finance, compiled a 3.51 grade point average (GPA), and aspired to be a successful businessman.

== Professional career ==
=== Minor leagues (2009–11) ===
Ruf was drafted by the Philadelphia Phillies in the 20th round of the 2009 Major League Baseball draft. After the Phillies drafted him, scouting director Marti Wolever asserted that Ruf "is an outstanding defensive first baseman with a chance to hit and has tremendous makeup." After converting to play predominantly in the outfield, however, Ruf's fielding was characterized as either "serviceable" or "weak", and Phillies general manager Rubén Amaro, Jr. commented that he did not have the defensive skills to play every day.

Ruf's first professional assignment was the Gulf Coast League Phillies in 2009; after performing well there, he was promoted to the Williamsport Crosscutters of Low–A. With both squads, he held a batting average of over .300. He also participated in the Florida Instructional League. In 2010, he began the season with the Lakewood BlueClaws, also of Single–A, but spent only 32 games there. The Phillies promoted him to the High–A Clearwater Threshers, and was the Phillies' minor league player of the week in late May. In total, he amassed nine home runs and 67 RBI while posting a .290 amalgamated batting average.

Ruf's power emergence began in 2011 when he hit a Florida State League–leading 43 doubles, as well as 17 home runs (8th in the league) and 82 RBI (4th) and a .308 batting average. Defensively, he played first base, third base, and left field, and even pitched two innings of relief during a 23–inning game. Ruf was named an MiLB.com Organization All Star and a post-season All Star. After the season, he played in the Arizona Fall League for the Scottsdale Scorpions.

=== Philadelphia Phillies (2012–2016) ===
Ruf enjoyed great success playing for the Reading Phillies (since renamed the Reading Fightin Phils) in 2012, earning Eastern League Most Valuable Player (MVP) honors, as well as the Paul Owens Award, which is given to the best player in the Phillies' minor league system. During the season, the Fightin Phils sold T-shirts that said "Babe Ruf", a reference to Babe Ruth. He batted .317/.408/.620 and led the Eastern League (and all of minor league baseball) with 38 home runs, 104 RBIs, in on-base percentage, in slugging percentage, and in 1.028 OPS, and tied for the league lead by playing in 139 games and 11 sacrifice flies, while second in runs behind Aaron Hicks (93), third in walks (65), and seventh in doubles (32), all en route to earning a September callup and making his major league debut on September 14 (skipping the Triple-A level entirely). He was named Rookie of the Year, a mid-season All Star, a post-season All Star, an MiLB.com Organization All Star, and a Topps Double-A All Star.

He recorded his first major league hit on September 25, a home run off the Washington Nationals' Ross Detwiler. Ruf totaled three home runs and 10 RBIs in his 12-game "cup of coffee" at the end of the season. An article on Phillies Nation summarized his season and journey through the minor league system:

Darin Ruf slugged his way onto the scene about midway through the 2012 season with the Reading Phillies; it wasn't as though Ruf was some highly-touted prospect everyone knew about. Really, he was an afterthought at 26 years old; a guy who was just kind of there. That all changed.

— Excerpt from Phillies Player Review: Darin Ruf by Pat Gallen, November 4, 2012

Ruf started the 2013 season in Triple-A with the Lehigh Valley IronPigs, but was recalled by the Phillies on July 6 when Ryan Howard was placed on the disabled list. In the minor leagues he was named a Baseball America Double-A All Star. At the major league level, he finished fifth among rookies with 14 home runs, nine of which were in August, the most among any major league player during that stretch. Of his 70 starts at the major league level, 28 were at first base, 27 in right field, and 16 in left field, while of his 78 starts in Triple-A, 59 came in left field and 19 came at first base. Ruf struggled to find a spot on the Phillies roster at which he could contribute, despite strong performance: "Even after proving he can be a productive offensive contributor and showing his defensive versatility, Ruf's spot in the Phils’ lineup may not be locked in for next season." one columnist wrote. For the season, he batted .247/.348/.458.

Entering the 2014 season, he was set to compete for a spot on the bench, as Amaro declared that he was not good enough, particularly defensively, to play every day. However, the Phillies placed him on the disabled list (DL) due to a strained oblique; his estimated recovery time was around the end of April or the beginning of May. When Ruf returned, he played for the IronPigs, but suffered another injury on June 3, fracturing his left wrist when sliding into the wall while playing left field. He returned to the major league Phillies on July 22 when John Mayberry, Jr. landed on the disabled list, but struggled in his first several games; in his first 17 at-bats, he had just two hits. Nevertheless, the Phillies toyed with platooning him with Ryan Howard, who was also struggling, at first base, and Ruf also played two innings at third base. Overall, Ruf amassed only 117 major league plate appearances, batting .235/.310/.402, and was significantly hindered by injuries.

As 2015 began, Ruf once again had to fight for playing time; there was no clear opening for him on the Phillies' roster, notwithstanding the fact that he was one of the few players on the roster with the ability to hit for power. For the season, he batted .235/.300/.414. He had the lowest batting average against right-handers among all MLB hitters (140 or more plate appearances), at .158.

On May 13, 2016, Ruf was optioned to Triple-A to make room on the roster for Tommy Joseph. With Lehigh Valley he was second in the league with 20 home runs, 5th with a .529 slugging percentage, and 7th with 65 RBIs. He was named an MiLB.com Organization All Star. For the season in the major leagues, he batted .205/.236/.337. On November 11, 2016, Ruf was traded to the Los Angeles Dodgers (along with Darnell Sweeney) in exchange for Howie Kendrick.

=== Samsung Lions (2017–2019) ===
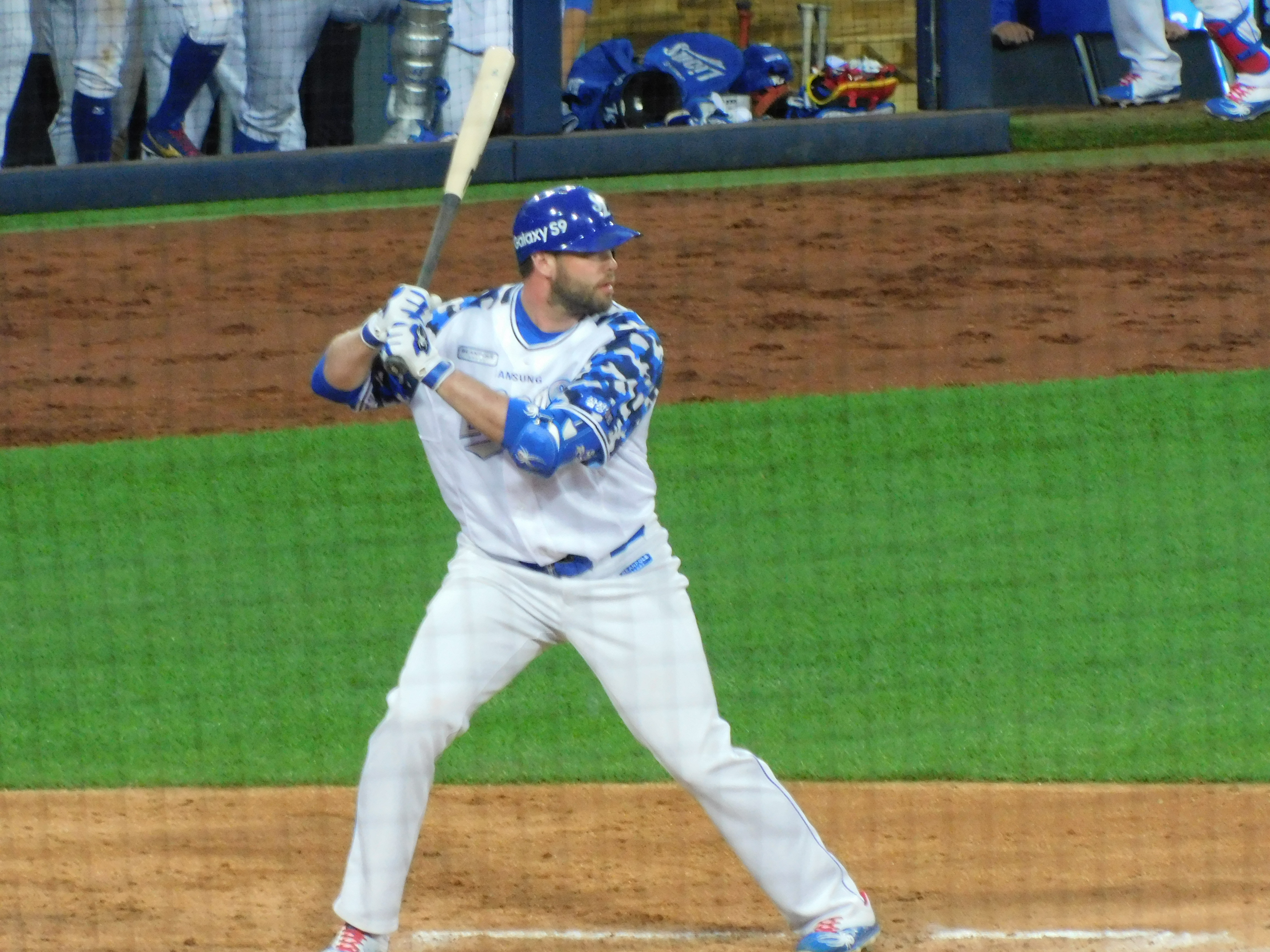
Ruf batting for the Samsung Lions in June 2018

On February 17, 2017, Ruf's $1.1 million contract with the Dodgers was sold to the Samsung Lions of the KBO League. In his first season in South Korea, Ruf batted .315/.396/.569 and led the KBO League with 124 RBIs while also hitting 38 doubles (5th) and 31 home runs (6th).

He was re-signed for the 2018 season at $1.5 million. In 2018 he batted .330/.419/.605 with 33 home runs (8th) and 125 RBIs (tied for 2nd) and 65 walks (6th) with a 1.024 OPS (3rd).

In 2019 he batted .292/.396/.515 with 35 doubles (4th in the league), 22 home runs (6th), 101 RBIs (5th), and 80 walks (2nd), with a .911 OPS (5th). Ruf became a free agent following the 2019 season.

=== San Francisco Giants (2020–2022) ===
On January 23, 2020, Ruf signed a minor league deal with the San Francisco Giants. He made the team's opening day roster. He finished the season batting .276/.370/.517 with 5 home runs and 18 RBIs in 87 at bats over 40 games.

For the 2021 season, the Giants extended Ruf through one-year arbitration on a $1.275 million deal. In the 2021 regular season, he batted .271/.385/.519 with 16 home runs and 43 RBIs in 262 at bats. He played 44 games at first base, 33 games in left field, 5 games in right field, and pitched in one game.

On March 22, 2022, Ruf signed a 2-year, $6.25 million contract with the Giants, avoiding salary arbitration. In a July 21 game against the Los Angeles Dodgers, Ruf hit a game-tying grand slam off of Dodgers reliever Alex Vesia. However, the Giants would ultimately lose the game 6-9.

=== New York Mets (2022) ===
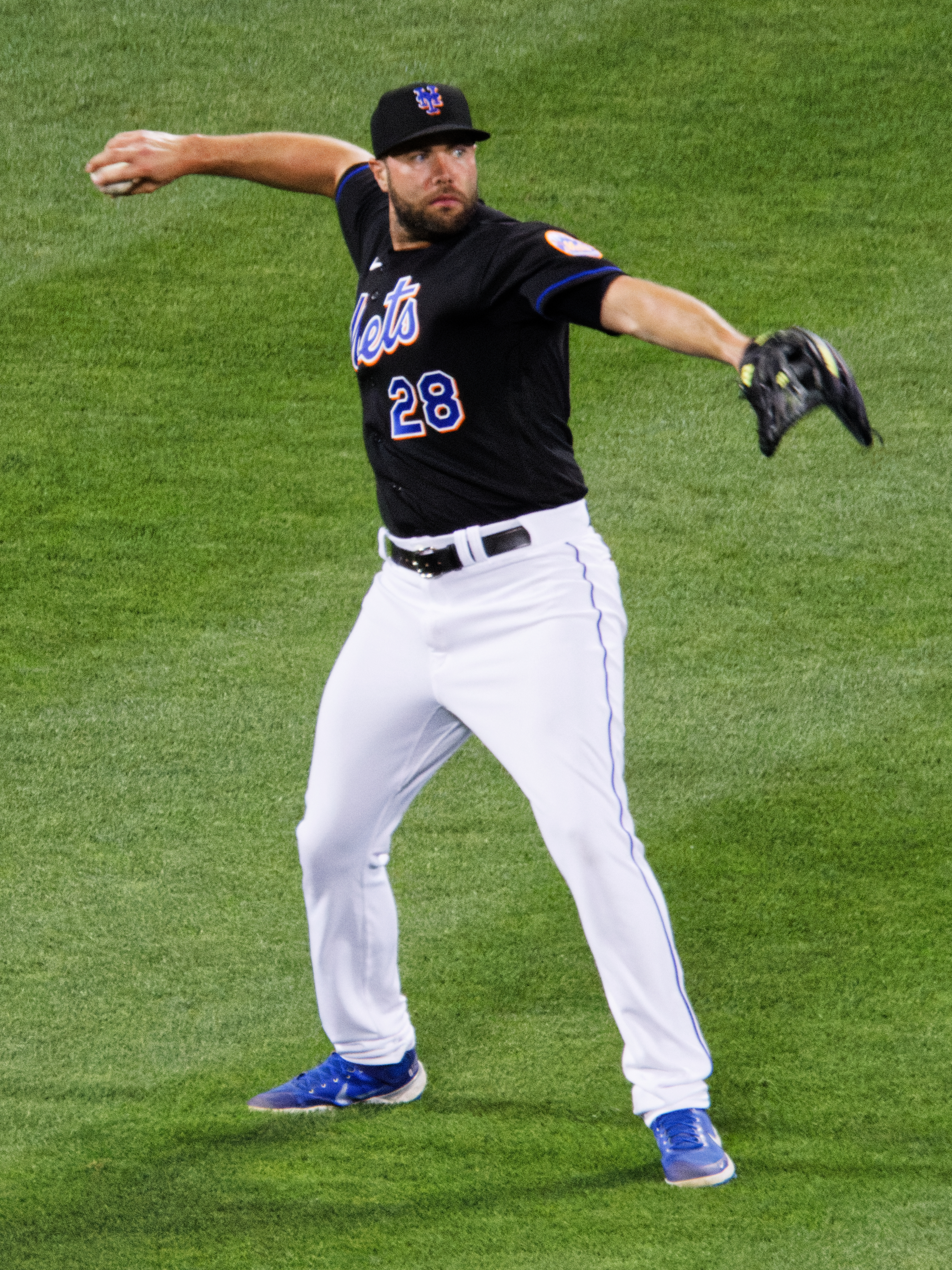
Ruf with the Mets in 2022

On August 2, 2022, Ruf was traded to the New York Mets in exchange for J. D. Davis, Carson Seymour, Nick Zwack and Thomas Szapucki. He made his Mets debut on August 5, entering as a pinch hitter for Tyler Naquin and remaining in left field. On August 15, Ruf made his first pitching appearance for the Mets, throwing two scoreless innings in a loss against the Atlanta Braves, in the process becoming the first regular position player to pitch multiple innings in one game for the Mets. Ruf appeared in 28 games for the Mets down the stretch, limping to a .152/.216/.197 slash with no home runs and 7 RBI.

Ruf later said that the trade came at an especially difficult time in his life because he was still mourning his father who had died that May. He also said he struggled to handle the pressure of playing in New York City for a demanding fanbase and critical sports media.

On March 27, 2023, Ruf was designated for assignment after Tommy Hunter was added to the roster. He was released by the Mets on April 2.

=== Second stint with Giants (2023) ===
On April 8, 2023, Ruf signed a minor league contract with the San Francisco Giants organization. Ruf was happy to re-sign in San Francisco after an unhappy stint in New York, saying "There’s not a better spot for me to go where people know me, I know them, I’m comfortable ... and working with people I love working with." Four days later, his contract was selected to the Major league roster. He played in 9 games for the Giants, going 6-for-23 (.261) with 3 RBI before he was placed on the injured list with right wrist inflammation. While on rehab assignment with the Triple-A Sacramento River Cats, Ruf went 4-for-20 with a double and a RBI. On May 9, he was activated from the injured list and designated for assignment to clear roster space for Casey Schmitt. Ruf was not claimed on waivers, but refused an outright assignment to Triple-A and became a free agent.

=== Milwaukee Brewers (2023) ===
On May 15, 2023, Ruf signed a one-year contract with the Milwaukee Brewers. On June 2, Ruf suffered a knee laceration after colliding with a tarp while chasing a foul ball in a game against the Cincinnati Reds. He was placed on the 60-day injured list on June 5 after he was diagnosed with a non–displaced fracture of his patella in addition to a deep laceration in his right knee. Ruf became a free agent following the season.

== Coaching career ==
On September 4, 2024, Ruf joined the University of Nebraska, Omaha baseball program as an assistant coach.

== Player profile ==
Eric Longenhagen, a baseball analyst for Crashburn Alley, asserted in 2013 that Ruf's ceiling was a platoon player at first base, but that his superior intangibles had allowed him to overachieve in terms of his potential. He wrote,

For him to be anything more than that would be positively historic. We’ve never seen a player of this age with a similar skill set (a fringe average hitter with a huge hole in his swing and plus raw power who is a 20 runner with pretty much unknown arm strength) do anything sustainable of note at the major league level. Ruf turns 28 halfway through next year and possesses both a skillset and body that typically don't age well. It's a very weird situation but it's a triumph of the Phillies player development system and of Ruf's effort that he ever put on a Major League uniform at all.

— Excerpt from Solving the Maize: Reflections on Ruf, Asche, and Player Makeup by Eric Longehagen, September 15, 2013

=== Offense ===
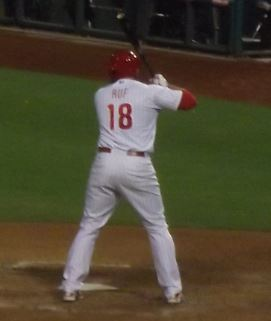
Ruf batting for the Phillies in 2014

Ruf is a strong power hitter who, according to one talent evaluator quoted in Lindy's Sports 2014 baseball preview magazine, possessed "raw country strength" at the plate. He has an uppercut swing, and struggles to hit outside pitches because of poor balance at the plate, but consequently, is able to hit fly balls and drive mistake pitches out of the park. He is a patient hitter, and hits left-handed pitchers better than right-handed pitchers.

=== Defense ===
Ruf has played first base as well as both of the corner outfield spots during his career, and focused on the outfield during the latter stages of his development because of Ryan Howard's perceived preeminence at first base. In the outfield, Ruf is a "liability", and he is "pretty shaky" at first base, further underscoring his "man without a position" persona within the Phillies' organization. This has led some to suggest he would be better suited as a designated hitter in the American League. In the 2020 season, which saw the DH introduced to the National League, the Giants used him in this capacity as well as in the field.

== Personal life ==
Ruf married Libby Schuring in December 2011. His hobbies include golfing and traveling. As of 2023, Ruf lives during the offseason in Scottsdale, Arizona, with his wife and two kids, Henry and Olive. Christa Ruf, Ruf's sister, also attended Creighton; she played softball there for four seasons.

On May 23, 2025, Ruf filed a lawsuit against the Cincinnati Reds, purporting negligence due to a career-ending injury he suffered after crashing into an uncovered tarp roller at Great American Ball Park on June 2, 2023.
