= Bryce Montes de Oca =

American baseball player (born 1996)

Caliente de Durango
- Pitcher
- Born: April 23, 1996 (age 30); Lawrence, Kansas, U.S.
- Bats: Right Throws: Right

MLB debut
- September 3, 2022, for the New York Mets

MLB statistics (through 2022 season)
- Win–loss record: 0–0
- Earned run average: 10.80
- Strikeouts: 6
- Stats at Baseball Reference

Teams
- New York Mets (2022)

Bryce Montes de Oca (born April 23, 1996) is an American professional baseball pitcher for the Caliente de Durango of the Mexican League. He has previously played in Major League Baseball (MLB) for the New York Mets.

== Early life ==
Montes de Oca was born in Lawrence, Kansas, to parents Ivo and Susan. He is of Cuban descent.

== Amateur career ==
Montes de Oca attended Lawrence High School in Lawrence, Kansas. He played for the school's baseball team, but required Tommy John surgery in April 2013. He returned in 2014, throwing a 95-mile-per-hour (153 km/h) fastball. USA Today selected him for their All-Kansas high school baseball team. The Chicago White Sox selected Montes de Oca in the 14th round of the 2014 MLB draft. He did not sign with the White Sox, and enrolled at the University of Missouri, where he played college baseball for the Missouri Tigers.

Montes de Oca had a second elbow surgery while with Missouri, and pitched 8 1/3 innings in his first two years. He returned from the injury throwing as fast as 100 miles per hour (160 km/h). In 2015 and 2016, he played collegiate summer baseball with the Falmouth Commodores of the Cape Cod Baseball League. The Washington Nationals selected him in the 15th round of the 2017 MLB draft, but he did not sign, and returned to Missouri in 2018. On March 2, 2018, Montes de Oca and two relief pitchers combined to throw a no-hitter.

== Professional career ==
=== New York Mets ===
The New York Mets selected him in the ninth round, 260th overall, of the 2018 Major League Baseball draft. He signed with the Mets, beginning his professional career. Montes de Oca underwent multiple surgeries after being drafted, however, and made his professional debut on May 5, 2021, with the High-A Brooklyn Cyclones. He finished the year with the Double-A Binghamton Rumble Ponies, posting a 4.50 ERA with 47 strikeouts and six saves in 34 innings of work across 28 games for both teams. He began the 2022 season with Binghamton before being promoted to the Triple-A Syracuse Mets. In 44 combined games, he registered a 3–3 record and 3.33 ERA with 80 strikeouts and 11 saves in 51 1/3 innings pitched.

On September 3, 2022, Montes de Oca was selected to the 40-man roster and promoted to the major leagues for the first time. He made his MLB debut the same day, striking out one batter and yielding one hit, one walk and no runs pitching 2/3 of an inning to finish a 7–1 loss to the Washington Nationals. He finished his rookie campaign with a 10.80 ERA and six strikeouts in 3 1/3 innings across three appearances.

On March 28, 2023, it was announced that Montes de Oca would undergo arthroscopic surgery to remove bone fragments from his right elbow, sidelining him for four months. During the surgery, doctors discovered that he needed Tommy John surgery and performed the procedure, ending his 2023 season. Following the season on November 2, Montes de Oca was removed from the 40–man roster and sent outright to Triple–A Syracuse.

Montes de Oca returned to action in 2024, making rehabilitation appearances for the Single-A St. Lucie Mets, Binghamton, and Syracuse. In August 2024, Montes de Oca underwent an additional Tommy John procedure, ruling him out for the remainder of the season. On March 15, 2025, Montes de Oca was placed on the minor league full-season injured list. He elected free agency following the season on November 6.

=== Washington Nationals ===
On January 23, 2026, The Washington Nationals signed Montes de Oca to a minor league contract, and invited him to major league spring training. He made nine appearances split between the rookie-level Florida Complex League Nationals, Single-A Fredericksburg Nationals, High-A Wilmington Blue Rocks, and Triple-A Rochester Red Wings, posting a cumulative 1–1 record and 12.86 ERA with nine strikeouts over seven innings of work. Montes de Oca was released by the Nationals organization on June 10.

=== Caliente de Durango ===
On July 11, 2026, Montes de Oca signed with the Caliente de Durango of the Mexican League.
