= Thomas Szapucki =

American baseball player (born 1996)

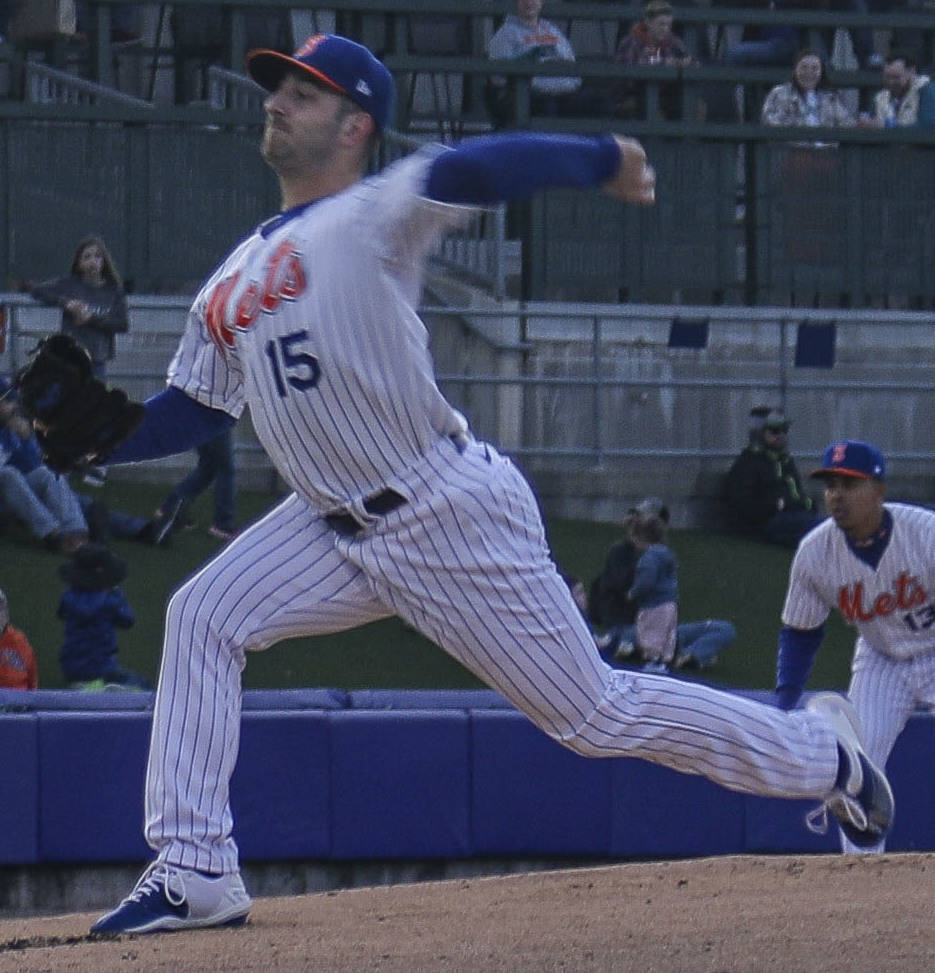
- Szapucki with the Syracuse Mets in 2022

Lancaster Stormers
- Pitcher
- Born: June 12, 1996 (age 30); Toms River, New Jersey, U.S.
- Bats: Right Throws: Left

MLB debut
- June 30, 2021, for the New York Mets

MLB statistics (through 2022 season)
- Win–loss record: 0–1
- Earned run average: 8.68
- Strikeouts: 22
- Stats at Baseball Reference

Teams
- New York Mets (2021–2022); San Francisco Giants (2022)

Thomas Mathew Szapucki (born June 12, 1996) is an American professional baseball pitcher for the Lancaster Stormers of the Atlantic League of Professional Baseball. He has previously played in Major League Baseball (MLB) for the New York Mets and San Francisco Giants. He was selected by the Mets in the fifth round of the 2015 Major League Baseball draft.

== Amateur career ==
Szapucki attended William T. Dwyer High School in Palm Beach Gardens, Florida. He was selected by the New York Mets in the fifth round of the 2015 Major League Baseball draft. He signed with the Mets for a signing bonus of $375,000, forgoing his commitment to the University of Florida.

== Professional career ==
=== New York Mets ===
Szapucki made his professional debut in 2015 with the rookie-level Gulf Coast League Mets. He started 2016 with the Kingsport Mets, and was promoted to the Brooklyn Cyclones during the season. Szapucki finished 2016 with a combined 4-3 record and 1.38 ERA in 52 total innings pitched, with a 0.885 WHIP and 14.9 strikeouts per 9 innings, between the two teams. He was named a Baseball America Rookie All-Star.

He spent 2017 with the Columbia Fireflies, posting a 1-2 record, 2.79 ERA, and a 1.17 WHIP over 29 innings before undergoing Tommy John surgery in July, thus ending his season.

MLB.com ranked Szapucki as New York's fifth-ranked prospect going into the 2018 season. He missed all of 2018 due to undergoing Tommy John surgery.

He returned to play in 2019 with Columbia, before being promoted to the St. Lucie Mets in July, and to the Binghamton Rumble Ponies in August. Over 21 games (18 starts) between the three clubs, he went 1-3 with a 2.63 ERA, striking out 72 over 61 2/3 innings, with a 1.216 WHIP and 10.5 strikeouts per 9 innings.

Szapucki was added to the Mets 40–man roster following the 2019 season. He did not play a minor league game in 2020 due to the cancellation of the minor league season caused by the COVID-19 pandemic.

On May 27, 2021, Szapucki was promoted to the major leagues for the first time, but was optioned down to the Triple-A Syracuse Mets the next day without making an appearance. He was recalled to the active roster and promoted to the majors a second time on June 29. He made his MLB debut the next day, pitching in relief against the Atlanta Braves, but allowed six runs in four and two-thirds innings. He was optioned back to Syracuse two days later. On July 13, it was announced that Szapucki would require ulnar nerve transposition surgery, ending his rookie campaign at one appearance.

Szapucki was again promoted to the active roster on May 25, 2022, starting against the San Francisco Giants on that day. He pitched one and one-third innings, allowing nine earned runs, in his only appearance with the Mets for the season. With Triple-A Syracuse in 2022, he was 2-6 with a 3.38 ERA in 18 games (16 starts), in which he pitched 64 innings and struck out 87 batters.

=== San Francisco Giants ===
On August 2, 2022, Szapucki, Carson Seymour, Nick Zwack, and J. D. Davis were traded to the San Francisco Giants for Darin Ruf. In 2022 with the Triple-A Sacramento River Cats, he was 0-0 with a 1.08 ERA in 8.1 innings in which he struck out 15 batters. In 10 appearances for San Francisco, he recorded a 1.98 ERA with 16 strikeouts across 13 2/3 innings pitched.

On March 30, 2023, Szapucki was placed on the 60-day injured list with left arm neuropathy. On May 19, Szapucki underwent surgery for thoracic outlet syndrome, and missed the remainder of the year without appearing in a game for the Giants. Following the season on November 17, Szapucki was non–tendered by the Giants and became a free agent.

On November 18, 2023, Szapucki re–signed with the Giants on a minor league contract. He made only one appearance for the rookie-level Arizona Complex League Giants, and elected free agency following the season on November 4, 2024.

=== Detroit Tigers ===
On February 14, 2025, Szapucki signed a minor league contract with the Detroit Tigers. In 12 appearances split between the rookie-level Florida Complex League Tigers, Single-A Lakeland Flying Tigers, and Triple-A Toledo Mud Hens, he accumulated an 0.68 ERA with 17 strikeouts and one save across 13 1/3 innings pitched. Szapucki was released by the Tigers organization on August 4.

=== Lancaster Stormers ===
On March 18, 2026, Szapucki signed with the Lancaster Stormers of the Atlantic League of Professional Baseball.
