= 2022 Cincinnati Reds season =

2022 Cincinnati Reds
- League: National League
- Division: Central
- Ballpark: Great American Ball Park
- City: Cincinnati, Ohio
- Record: 62–100 (.383)
- Divisional place: T-4th
- Owners: Bob Castellini
- General managers: Nick Krall
- Managers: David Bell
- Television: Bally Sports Ohio (John Sadak, Jeff Brantley, Barry Larkin, Chris Welsh, Jim Day(sideline), Brian Giesenschlag (host), Sam LeCure (host), Annie Sabo (journalist/fill in host)
- Radio: WLW (700 AM); Reds Radio Network (Tommy Thrall, Jeff Brantley, Chris Welsh)
- Stats: ESPN.com; Baseball Reference

The 2022 Cincinnati Reds season was the 153rd season for the franchise in Major League Baseball, and their 20th at Great American Ball Park in Cincinnati.

On December 2, 2021, Commissioner of Baseball Rob Manfred announced a lockout of players, following expiration of the collective bargaining agreement (CBA) between the league and the Major League Baseball Players Association (MLBPA). On March 10, 2022, MLB and the MLBPA agreed to a new collective bargaining agreement, thus ending the lockout. Opening Day was played on April 7. Although MLB previously announced that several series would be cancelled due to the lockout, the agreement provides for a 162-game season, with originally canceled games to be made up via doubleheaders.

The Reds finished the season 62–100, tied for fourth in the National League Central. It was their first 100-loss season since 1982 and their 2nd in franchise history. The 2022 season was only the 3rd time since 1890 that the Reds opened the season on the road (following the 1966 and 1990 seasons). Reds pitchers hit 110 batters in 2022, breaking the previous record of 109 set by the 1899 Cleveland Spiders.

== Offseason ==
=== Lockout ===
The expiration of the league's collective bargaining agreement (CBA) with the Major League Baseball Players Association occurred on December 1, 2021 with no new agreement in place. As a result, the team owners voted unanimously to lockout the players stopping all free agency and trades.

The parties came to an agreement on a new CBA on March 10, 2022.

=== Rule changes ===
Pursuant to the new CBA, several new rules were instituted for the 2022 season. The National League will adopt the designated hitter full-time, a draft lottery will be implemented, the postseason will expand from ten teams to twelve, and advertising patches will appear on player uniforms and helmets for the first time.

=== Transactions ===
After the lockout, the Reds went on a fire sale. The Reds let their outfielder Nick Castellanos sign with the Philadelphia Phillies and placed starting pitcher Wade Miley on waivers and was picked up by the Chicago Cubs. The Reds also traded many players. The Reds traded pitcher Amir Garrett to the Kansas City Royals, starting pitcher Sonny Gray to the Minnesota Twins, catcher Tucker Barnhart to the Detroit Tigers, and both infielder Eugenio Suárez and outfielder Jesse Winker to the Seattle Mariners. Reds owner Bob Castellini was criticized for this and Reds fans protested and asked him to sell the team. Phil Castellini, Reds president/chief operating officer and the owner's son, fanned the flames of fan resentment when he responded in a WLW interview prior to the team's April 12 home opener, "Well, where are you gonna go? Let’s start there. Sell the team to who?...What would you do with this team to have it be more profitable, make more money and compete more in the current economic system that this game exists? It would be to pick it up and move it somewhere else." He also told Reds fans "be careful what you ask for."

== Regular season ==
=== The start of the season ===
The Reds' 2022 started off historically bad. Through the first 25 games, the Reds won only 3 games. They tie with the 2003 Detroit Tigers as the worst start to a season through 25 games at 3–22 behind the 1988 Baltimore Orioles who started 2–23 including a 0–21 start.

=== Standings ===
==== National League Central ====
NL Central
Team	W	L	Pct.	GB	Home	Road
St. Louis Cardinals	93	69	.574	—	53‍–‍28	40‍–‍41
Milwaukee Brewers	86	76	.531	7	46‍–‍35	40‍–‍41
Chicago Cubs	74	88	.457	19	37‍–‍44	37‍–‍44
Pittsburgh Pirates	62	100	.383	31	34‍–‍47	28‍–‍53
Cincinnati Reds	62	100	.383	31	33‍–‍48	29‍–‍52

==== National League Wild Card ====
Division leaders
Team	W	L	Pct.
Los Angeles Dodgers	111	51	.685
Atlanta Braves	101	61	.623
St. Louis Cardinals	93	69	.574

Wild Card teams (Top 3 teams qualify for postseason)
Team	W	L	Pct.	GB
New York Mets	101	61	.623	+14
San Diego Padres	89	73	.549	+2
Philadelphia Phillies	87	75	.537	—
Milwaukee Brewers	86	76	.531	1
San Francisco Giants	81	81	.500	6
Arizona Diamondbacks	74	88	.457	13
Chicago Cubs	74	88	.457	13
Miami Marlins	69	93	.426	18
Colorado Rockies	68	94	.420	19
Pittsburgh Pirates	62	100	.383	25
Cincinnati Reds	62	100	.383	25
Washington Nationals	55	107	.340	32

==== Record vs. opponents ====
2022 National League record Source: MLB Standings Grid – 2022
Team	AZ	ATL	CHC	CIN	COL	LAD	MIA	MIL	NYM	PHI	PIT	SD	SF	STL	WSH	AL
Arizona	—	2–4	4–3	3–4	9–10	5–14	5–1	4–3	2–4	3–3	4–3	5–14	10–9	2–5	4–3	12–8
Atlanta	4–2	—	3–3	4–3	6–1	2–4	13–6	3–3	10–9	11–8	7–0	3–4	4–3	4–3	14–5	13–7
Chicago	3–4	3–3	—	11–8	3–4	0–7	4–2	10–9	4–3	6–0	10–9	2–5	2–5	6–13	4–2	6–14
Cincinnati	4–3	3–4	8–11	—	2–4	0–7	4–3	6–13	1–5	1–6	7–12	0–6	4–2	7–12	3–4	12–8
Colorado	10–9	1–6	4–3	4–2	—	8–11	2–4	3–4	2–5	2–5	3–3	10–9	5–14	2–4	3–4	9–11
Los Angeles	14–5	4–2	7–0	7–0	11–8	—	6–1	4–3	3–4	3–4	1–5	14–5	15–4	4–2	3–3	15–5
Miami	1–5	6–13	2–4	3–4	4–2	1–6	—	4–3	6–13	7–12	4–3	3–4	3–4	2–4	15–4	8–12
Milwaukee	3–4	3–3	9–10	13–6	4–3	3–4	3–4	—	2–4	2–4	11–8	3–4	3–4	9–10	3–3	15–5
New York	4–2	9–10	3–4	5–1	5–2	4–3	13–6	4–2	—	14–5	6–1	2–4	4–3	5–2	14–5	9–11
Philadelphia	3–3	8–11	0–6	6–1	5–2	4–3	12–7	4–2	5–14	—	6–1	4–3	1–5	4–3	16–3	9–11
Pittsburgh	3–4	0–7	9–10	12–7	3–3	5–1	3–4	8–11	1–6	1–6	—	2–4	1–5	6–13	4–3	4–16
San Diego	14–5	4–3	5–2	6–0	9–10	5–14	4–3	4–3	4–2	3–4	4–2	—	13–6	2–4	4–3	8–12
San Francisco	9–10	3–4	5–2	2–4	14–5	4–15	4–3	4–3	3–4	5–1	5–1	6–13	—	3–4	4–2	10–10
St. Louis	5–2	3–4	13–6	12–7	4–2	2–4	4–2	10–9	2–5	3–4	13–6	4–2	4–3	—	4–3	10–10
Washington	3–4	5–14	2–4	4–3	4–3	3–3	4–15	3–3	5–14	3–16	3–4	3–4	2–4	3–4	—	8–12

Updated with the results of all games through October 5, 2022.

== Game log ==
2022 Game Log: 62–100 (Home: 33–48; Away: 29–52)
April: 3–18 (Home: 1–7; Away: 2–11)

#	Date	Opponent	Score	Win	Loss	Save	Stadium	Attendance	Record	Streak
1	April 7	@ Braves	6–3	**Mahle** (1–0)	Fried (0–1)	**Santillan** (1)	Truist Park	40,545	1–0	W1
2	April 8	@ Braves	6–7	Morton (1–0)	**Sanmartin** (0–1)	—	Truist Park	40,234	1–1	L1
3	April 9	@ Braves	1–2	Wright (1–0)	**Gutiérrez** (0–1)	Smith (1)	Truist Park	40,310	1–2	L2
4	April 10	@ Braves	6–3	**Greene** (1–0)	Anderson (0–1)	**Warren** (1)	Truist Park	38,233	2–2	W1
5	April 12	Guardians	5–10	Stephan (1–0)	**Strickland** (0–1)	—	**Great American Ball Park**	43,036	2–3	L1
6	April 13	Guardians	3–7	Morgan (1–0)	**Lodolo** (0–1)	—	**Great American Ball Park**	10,976	2–4	L2
7	April 14	@ Dodgers	3–9	Treinen (1–1)	**Wilson** (0–1)	—	Dodger Stadium	52,955	2–5	L3
8	April 15	@ Dodgers	1–3	Anderson (1–0)	**Gutiérrez** (0–2)	Kimbrel (2)	Dodger Stadium	51,891	2–6	L4
9	April 16	@ Dodgers	2–5	Phillips (1–0)	**Greene** (1–1)	Hudson (1)	Dodger Stadium	51,059	2–7	L5
10	April 17	@ Dodgers	1–9	Heaney (1–0)	**Mahle** (1–1)	—	Dodger Stadium	41,167	2–8	L6
11	April 18	@ Padres	1–4	Manaea (2–1)	**Lodolo** (0–2)	Rogers (5)	Petco Park	31,121	2–9	L7
12	April 19	@ Padres	2–6	Musgrove (2–0)	**Sanmartin** (0–2)	—	Petco Park	31,313	2–10	L8
13	April 20	@ Padres	0–6	Gore (1–0)	**Gutiérrez** (0–3)	—	Petco Park	29,359	2–11	L9
14	April 22	Cardinals	2–4	Matz (2–1)	**Greene** (1–2)	Gallegos (4)	**Great American Ball Park**	20,470	2–12	L10
15	April 23	Cardinals	0–5	Hudson (1–1)	**Mahle** (1–2)	—	**Great American Ball Park**	28,598	2–13	L11
16	April 24	Cardinals	4–1	**Lodolo** (1–2)	Wainwright (2–2)	**Sims** (1)	**Great American Ball Park**	23,124	3–13	W1
17	April 26	Padres	6–9	Musgrove (3–0)	**Sanmartin** (0–3)	Suárez (1)	**Great American Ball Park**	10,056	3–14	L1
18	April 27	Padres	5–8	Gore (2–0)	**Gutiérrez** (0–4)	Rogers (6)	**Great American Ball Park**	9,192	3–15	L2
19	April 28	Padres	5–7	Martinez (1–2)	**Mahle** (1–3)	Rogers (7)	**Great American Ball Park**	10,449	3–16	L3
20	April 29	@ Rockies	4–10	Senzatela (2–1)	**Greene** (1–3)	—	Coors Field	30,206	3–17	L4
21	April 30	@ Rockies	3–4	Kuhl (3–0)	**Warren** (0–1)	Bard (6)	Coors Field	32,179	3–18	L5

May: 14–13 (Home: 8–5; Away: 6–8)

#	Date	Opponent	Score	Win	Loss	Save	Stadium	Attendance	Record	Streak
22	May 1	@ Rockies	1–10	Freeland (1–3)	**Sanmartin** (0–4)	—	Coors Field	32,574	3–19	L6
23	May 3	@ Brewers	3–6	Woodruff (3–1)	**Mahle** (1–4)	Williams (2)	American Family Field	21,961	3–20	L7
24	May 4	@ Brewers	4–18	Peralta (1–1)	**Gutiérrez** (0–5)	—	American Family Field	25,413	3–21	L8
25	May 5	@ Brewers	5–10	Houser (3–2)	**Greene** (1–4)	—	American Family Field	21,715	3–22	L9
—	May 6	Pirates	Postponed (rain); Makeup: July 7							
26	May 7 (1)	Pirates	9–2	**Sims** (1–0)	Crowe (1–2)	—	**Great American Ball Park**	9,267	4–22	W1
27	May 7 (2)	Pirates	5–8	Hembree (2–0)	**Diehl** (0–1)	Bednar (3)	**Great American Ball Park**	21,448	4–23	L1
28	May 8	Pirates	7–3	**Warren** (1–1)	Peters (3–1)	—	**Great American Ball Park**	17,623	5–23	W1
29	May 9	Brewers	10–5	**Cessa** (1–0)	Woodruff (3–2)	—	**Great American Ball Park**	10,046	6–23	W2
30	May 10	Brewers	4–5	Peralta (2–1)	**Greene** (1–5)	Hader (12)	**Great American Ball Park**	10,445	6–24	L1
31	May 11	Brewers	14–11	**Díaz** (1–0)	Houser (3–3)	—	**Great American Ball Park**	11,851	7–24	W1
32	May 12	@ Pirates	4–0	**Overton** (1–0)	Brubaker (0–3)	—	PNC Park	9,470	8–24	W2
33	May 13	@ Pirates	8–2	**Mahle** (2–4)	Keller (0–5)	—	PNC Park	12,588	9–24	W3
34	May 14	@ Pirates	1–3	Thompson (2–3)	**Castillo** (0–1)	Bednar (6)	PNC Park	12,959	9–25	L1
35	May 15	@ Pirates	0–1	Stratton (2–1)	**Greene** (1–6)	Bednar (7)	PNC Park	10,559	9–26	L2
36	May 17	@ Guardians	5–4 (10)	**Warren** (2–1)	Sandlin (3–2)	**Díaz** (1)	Progressive Field	12,916	10–26	W1
—	May 18	@ Guardians	Postponed (rain); Makeup: May 19							
37	May 19	@ Guardians	4–2	**Cessa** (2–0)	Stephan (2–1)	**Santillan** (2)	Progressive Field	8,510	11–26	W2
38	May 20	@ Blue Jays	1–2	Ryu (1–0)	**Castillo** (0–2)	Romano (13)	Rogers Centre	29,300	11–27	L1
39	May 21	@ Blue Jays	1–3	Manoah (5–1)	**Cessa** (2–1)	Romano (14)	Rogers Centre	39,393	11–28	L2
40	May 22	@ Blue Jays	3–2	**Díaz** (2–0)	García (0–3)	**Warren** (2)	Rogers Centre	42,323	12–28	W1
41	May 23	Cubs	4–7	Smyly (2–5)	**Gutiérrez** (0–6)	Robertson (6)	**Great American Ball Park**	12,029	12–29	L1
42	May 24	Cubs	4–11	Stroman (2–4)	**Mahle** (2–5)	Gsellman (1)	**Great American Ball Park**	14,386	12–30	L2
43	May 25	Cubs	4–3	**Castillo** (1–2)	Hendricks (2–5)	**Strickland** (1)	**Great American Ball Park**	11,417	13–30	W1
44	May 26	Cubs	20–5	**Greene** (2–6)	Steele (1–5)	—	**Great American Ball Park**	13,578	14–30	W2
45	May 27	Giants	5–1	**Ashcraft** (1–0)	Rodón (4–4)	**Warren** (3)	**Great American Ball Park**	19,000	15–30	W3
46	May 28	Giants	3–2	**Gutiérrez** (1–6)	Wood (3–4)	**Santillan** (3)	**Great American Ball Park**	26,655	16–30	W4
47	May 29	Giants	4–6	Brebbia (3–0)	**Warren** (2–2)	—	**Great American Ball Park**	20,439	16–31	L1
48	May 31	@ Red Sox	2–1	**Castillo** (2–2)	Wacha (3–1)	**Santillan** (4)	Fenway Park	28,577	17–31	W1

June: 9–18 (Home: 3–11; Away: 6–7)

#	Date	Opponent	Score	Win	Loss	Save	Stadium	Attendance	Record	Streak
49	June 1	@ Red Sox	1–7	Whitlock (2–1)	**Greene** (2–7)	—	Fenway Park	30,219	17–32	L1
50	June 2	Nationals	8–1	**Ashcraft** (2–0)	Adon (1–9)	—	**Great American Ball Park**	12,799	18–32	W1
51	June 3	Nationals	5–8	Gray (6–4)	**Minor** (0–1)	Rainey (6)	**Great American Ball Park**	19,032	18–33	L1
52	June 4	Nationals	8–10	Finnegan (2–1)	**Strickland** (0–2)	Rainey (7)	**Great American Ball Park**	23,128	18–34	L2
53	June 5	Nationals	4–5	Corbin (2–8)	**Castillo** (2–3)	Cishek (1)	**Great American Ball Park**	16,380	18–35	L3
54	June 6	Diamondbacks	7–0 (7)	**Greene** (3–7)	Bumgarner (2–5)	—	**Great American Ball Park**	9,485	19–35	W1
55	June 7	Diamondbacks	14–8	**Ashcraft** (3–0)	Gilbert (0–3)	—	**Great American Ball Park**	11,512	20–35	W2
56	June 8	Diamondbacks	0–7	Kelly (5–3)	**Minor** (0–2)	—	**Great American Ball Park**	11,957	20–36	L1
57	June 9	Diamondbacks	4–5	Melancon (2–6)	**Santillan** (0–1)	Kennedy (4)	**Great American Ball Park**	13,167	20–37	L2
58	June 10	@ Cardinals	0–2	Pallante (2–0)	**Castillo** (2–4)	Helsley (4)	Busch Stadium	45,009	20–38	L3
59	June 11	@ Cardinals	4–5	Wittgren (1–0)	**Kuhnel** (0–1)	—	Busch Stadium	43,832	20–39	L4
60	June 12	@ Cardinals	7–6	**Hoffman** (1–0)	Hudson (4–3)	**Díaz** (2)	Busch Stadium	43,083	21–39	W1
61	June 13	@ Diamondbacks	5–4	**Minor** (1–2)	Kelly (5–4)	**Strickland** (2)	Chase Field	13,735	22–39	W2
62	June 14	@ Diamondbacks	5–3 (12)	**Cessa** (3–1)	Poppen (1–1)	**Kuhnel** (1)	Chase Field	15,081	23–39	W3
63	June 15	@ Diamondbacks	4–7	Ramirez (2–1)	**Warren** (2–3)	—	Chase Field	14,917	23–40	L1
64	June 17	Brewers	4–5	Lauer (6–2)	**Detwiler** (0–1)	Boxberger (1)	**Great American Ball Park**	21,147	23–41	L2
65	June 18	Brewers	3–7	Alexander (1–0)	**Ashcraft** (3–1)	—	**Great American Ball Park**	25,071	23–42	L3
66	June 19	Brewers	3–6	Houser (4–7)	**Minor** (1–3)	Williams (5)	**Great American Ball Park**	25,001	23–43	L4
67	June 21	Dodgers	2–8	Gonsolin (9–0)	**Mahle** (2–6)	—	**Great American Ball Park**	18,476	23–44	L5
68	June 22	Dodgers	4–8	Vesia (1–0)	**Detwiler** (0–2)	—	**Great American Ball Park**	17,344	23–45	L6
69	June 23	Dodgers	5–10	Kershaw (5–1)	**Greene** (3–8)	—	**Great American Ball Park**	21,989	23–46	L7
70	June 24	@ Giants	4–2	**Ashcraft** (4–1)	Cobb (3–3)	**Strickland** (3)	Oracle Park	29,178	24–46	W1
71	June 25	@ Giants	2–9	Webb (7–2)	**Minor** (1–4)	—	Oracle Park	40,115	24–47	L1
72	June 26	@ Giants	10–3	**Mahle** (3–6)	DeSclafani (0–2)	—	Oracle Park	32,285	25–47	W1
73	June 28	@ Cubs	5–3	**Castillo** (3–4)	Thompson (7–3)	**Strickland** (4)	Wrigley Field	32,732	26–47	W2
74	June 29	@ Cubs	3–8	Steele (3–5)	**Greene** (3–9)	—	Wrigley Field	28,987	26–48	L1
75	June 30	@ Cubs	7–15	Hendricks (4–6)	**Ashcraft** (4–2)	—	Wrigley Field	32,318	26–49	L2

July: 14–12 (Home: 12–9; Away: 2–3)

#	Date	Opponent	Score	Win	Loss	Save	Stadium	Attendance	Record	Streak
76	July 1	Braves	1–9	Fried (8–2)	**Minor** (1–5)	—	**Great American Ball Park**	28,606	26–50	L3
77	July 2	Braves	1–4	Strider (4–2)	**Mahle** (3–7)	Smith (4)	**Great American Ball Park**	26,755	26–51	L4
78	July 3	Braves	4–3	**Strickland** (1–2)	Minter (4–2)	—	**Great American Ball Park**	21,418	27–51	W1
79	July 4	Mets	4–7	Walker (7–2)	**Greene** (3–10)	Lugo (3)	**Great American Ball Park**	19,533	27–52	L1
80	July 5	Mets	1–0	**Strickland** (2–2)	Lugo (1–2)	—	**Great American Ball Park**	13,487	28–52	W1
81	July 6	Mets	3–8 (10)	Ottavino (3–2)	**Moreta** (0–2)	—	**Great American Ball Park**	13,540	28–53	L1
82	July 7 (1)	Pirates	2–4	Contreras (3–2)	**Minor** (1–6)	Bednar (14)	**Great American Ball Park**	13,086	28–54	L2
83	July 7 (2)	Pirates	5–1	**Sanmartin** (1–4)	Wilson (1–5)	—	**Great American Ball Park**	9,575	29–54	W1
84	July 8	Rays	2–1 (10)	**Kuhnel** (1–1)	Wisler (2–3)	—	**Great American Ball Park**	26,529	30–54	W2
85	July 9	Rays	5–4 (10)	**Hoffman** (2–0)	Faucher (1–3)	—	**Great American Ball Park**	33,927	31–54	W3
86	July 10	Rays	10–5	**Lodolo** (2–2)	Baz (1–3)	—	**Great American Ball Park**	21,748	32–54	W4
87	July 12	@ Yankees	4–3	**Sanmartin** (2–4)	Holmes (4–1)	**Díaz** (3)	Yankee Stadium	40,235	33–54	W5
88	July 13	@ Yankees	6–7 (10)	King (6–1)	**Díaz** (2–1)	—	Yankee Stadium	36,772	33–55	L1
89	July 14	@ Yankees	7–6 (10)	**Sanmartin** (3–4)	Luetge (2–3)	**Moreta** (1)	Yankee Stadium	41,311	34–55	W1
90	July 15	@ Cardinals	3–7	Pallante (3–4)	**Greene** (3–11)	Helsley (8)	Busch Stadium	41,221	34–56	L1
91	July 16	@ Cardinals	3–11	Mikolas (7–7)	**Lodolo** (2–3)	—	Busch Stadium	41,014	34–57	L2
—	July 17	@ Cardinals	Postponed (rain); Makeup: September 17							
ASG	July 19	AL @ NL	3–2	Valdez (1–0)	Gonsolin (0–1)	Clase (1)	Dodger Stadium	52,518	N/A	N/A
92	July 22	Cardinals	9–5	**Sanmartin** (4–4)	Wainwright (6–8)	—	**Great American Ball Park**	25,547	35–57	W1
93	July 23	Cardinals	3–6	Matz (4–3)	**Minor** (1–7)	Helsley (9)	**Great American Ball Park**	27,190	35–58	L1
94	July 24	Cardinals	6–3	**Mahle** (4–7)	Mikolas (7–8)	**Strickland** (5)	**Great American Ball Park**	18,813	36–58	W1
95	July 25	Marlins	11–2	**Lodolo** (3–3)	Rogers (4–10)	—	**Great American Ball Park**	12,948	37–58	W2
96	July 26	Marlins	1–2	López (7–5)	**Greene** (3–12)	Scott (13)	**Great American Ball Park**	14,937	37–59	L1
97	July 27	Marlins	5–3	**Castillo** (4–4)	Garrett (2–4)	**Strickland** (6)	**Great American Ball Park**	11,387	38–59	W1
98	July 28	Marlins	6–7	Pop (2–0)	**Strickland** (2–3)	Scott (14)	**Great American Ball Park**	14,506	38–60	L1
99	July 29	Orioles	2–6	Tate (2–3)	**Farmer** (0–1)	—	**Great American Ball Park**	23,658	38–61	L2
100	July 30	Orioles	8–2	**Mahle** (5–7)	Kremer (3–3)	—	**Great American Ball Park**	29,104	39–61	W1
101	July 31	Orioles	3–2	**Díaz** (3–1)	Bautista (3–3)	**Farmer** (1)	**Great American Ball Park**	20,496	40–61	W2

August: 11–17 (Home: 3–6; Away: 8–11)

#	Date	Opponent	Score	Win	Loss	Save	Stadium	Attendance	Record	Streak
102	August 1	@ Marlins	3–1	**Greene** (4–12)	Luzardo (2–4)	**Strickland** (7)	LoanDepot Park	7,701	41–61	W3
103	August 2	@ Marlins	2–1	**Ashcraft** (5–2)	Garrett (2–5)	**Díaz** (4)	LoanDepot Park	8,188	42–61	W4
104	August 3	@ Marlins	0–3	Alcántara (10–4)	**Minor** (1–8)	—	LoanDepot Park	8,656	42–62	L1
105	August 5	@ Brewers	1–5	Lauer (8–3)	**Dugger** (0–1)	Williams (7)	American Family Field	33,239	42–63	L2
106	August 6	@ Brewers	7–5	**Farmer** (1–1)	Ashby (2–10)	—	American Family Field	35,784	43–63	W1
107	August 7	@ Brewers	4–2 (10)	**Strickland** (3–3)	Williams (2–2)	**Detwiler** (1)	American Family Field	40,063	44–63	W2
108	August 8	@ Mets	1–5	Bassitt (9–7)	**Dunn** (0–1)	—	Citi Field	28,448	44–64	L1
109	August 9	@ Mets	2–6	Carrasco (13–4)	**Minor** (1–9)	—	Citi Field	30,816	44–65	L2
110	August 10	@ Mets	2–10	Walker (10–3)	**Zeuch** (0–1)	—	Citi Field	36,883	44–66	L3
111	August 11†	Cubs	2–4	Smyly (5–6)	**Lodolo** (3–4)	Wick (7)	Field of Dreams	7,823	44–67	L4
112	August 13	Cubs	2–7	Newcomb (1–0)	**Ashcraft** (5–3)	—	**Great American Ball Park**	33,301	44–68	L5
113	August 14	Cubs	8–5	**Kuhnel** (2–1)	Espinoza (0–2)	**Díaz** (5)	**Great American Ball Park**	23,959	45–68	W1
114	August 15	Phillies	3–4	Syndergaard (7–8)	**Minor** (1–10)	Domínguez (9)	**Great American Ball Park**	14,635	45–69	L1
115	August 16	Phillies	4–11	Gibson (8–5)	**Zeuch** (0–2)	—	**Great American Ball Park**	17,074	45–70	L2
116	August 17	Phillies	1–0	**Díaz** (4–1)	Domínguez (6–4)	—	**Great American Ball Park**	13,622	46–70	W1
117	August 19	@ Pirates	4–5	Crowe (5–7)	**Kuhnel** (2–2)	—	PNC Park	17,706	46–71	L1
118	August 20	@ Pirates	10–1	**Dunn** (1–1)	Beede (1–3)	—	PNC Park	31,761	47–71	W1
119	August 21	@ Pirates	9–5	**Minor** (2–10)	Thompson (3–10)	—	PNC Park	15,046	48–71	W2
120	August 22	@ Phillies	1–4	Syndergaard (8–8)	**Cessa** (3–2)	Bellatti (2)	Citizens Bank Park	19,166	48–72	L1
121	August 23	@ Phillies	6–7	Hand (3–1)	**Díaz** (4–2)	—	Citizens Bank Park	20,220	48–73	L2
122	August 24	@ Phillies	5–7	Sánchez (2–1)	**Zeuch** (0–3)	Robertson (18)	Citizens Bank Park	24,400	48–74	L3
123	August 25	@ Phillies	0–4	Nola (9–10)	**Dunn** (1–2)	—	Citizens Bank Park	21,123	48–75	L4
124	August 26	@ Nationals	7–3	**Minor** (3–10)	Cavalli (0–1)	—	Nationals Park	31,256	49–75	W1
125	August 27	@ Nationals	6–2	**Gibaut** (1–0)	Espino (0–6)	**Díaz** (6)	Nationals Park	30,325	50–75	W2
126	August 28	@ Nationals	2–3	Corbin (5–17)	**Lodolo** (3–5)	Finnegan (8)	Nationals Park	31,411	50–76	L1
127	August 29	Cardinals	4–13	Stratton (7–4)	**Anderson** (0–1)	—	**Great American Ball Park**	11,051	50–77	L2
128	August 30	Cardinals	5–1	**Law** (1–1)	Hudson (7–7)	—	**Great American Ball Park**	13,271	51–77	W1
129	August 31	Cardinals	3–5 (13)	Pallante (6–4)	**Anderson** (0–2)	—	**Great American Ball Park**	13,613	51–78	L1
†The Reds will be the home team against the Cubs at the Field of Dreams movie site in the 2nd MLB at Field of Dreams game.

September: 9–19 (Home: 4–9; Away: 5–10)

#	Date	Opponent	Score	Win	Loss	Save	Stadium	Attendance	Record	Streak
130	September 2	Rockies	3–2	**Díaz** (5–2)	Colomé (2–7)	—	**Great American Ball Park**	16,763	52–78	W1
—	September 3	Rockies	Postponed (rain); Makeup: September 4							
131	September 4 (1)	Rockies	4–8	Márquez (8–10)	**Kuhnel** (2–3)	—	**Great American Ball Park**	see 2nd game	52–79	L1
132	September 4 (2)	Rockies	10–0	**Law** (2–1)	Ureña (3–6)	—	**Great American Ball Park**	23,060	53–79	W1
133	September 6	@ Cubs	3–9	Wesneski (1–0)	**Gibaut** (1–1)	—	Wrigley Field	27,600	53–80	L1
134	September 7	@ Cubs	7–1	**Minor** (4–10)	Assad (0–1)	—	Wrigley Field	27,945	54–80	W1
135	September 8	@ Cubs	4–3	**Díaz** (6–2)	Leiter Jr. (2–7)	**Gibaut** (1)	Wrigley Field	23,910	55–80	W2
136	September 9	@ Brewers	8–2	**Lodolo** (4–5)	Alexander (2–3)	—	American Family Field	33,660	56–80	W3
137	September 10	@ Brewers	1–5	Houser (6–9)	**Anderson** (0–3)	—	American Family Field	34,615	56–81	L1
138	September 11	@ Brewers	6–7	Woodruff (10–4)	**Dunn** (1–3)	Williams (12)	American Family Field	42,482	56–82	L2
139	September 12	Pirates	3–6	Wilson (3–8)	**Minor** (4–11)	Crowe (4)	**Great American Ball Park**	12,083	56–83	L3
140	September 13 (1)	Pirates	1–6	Oviedo (3–2)	**Cessa** (3–3)	—	**Great American Ball Park**	9,338	56–84	L4
141	September 13 (2)	Pirates	0–1	De Jong (5–2)	**Espinal** (0–1)	Underwood Jr. (1)	**Great American Ball Park**	13,156	56–85	L5
142	September 14	Pirates	4–10	Beede (2–5)	**Lodolo** (4–6)	Yajure (1)	**Great American Ball Park**	11,449	56–86	L6
143	September 15	@ Cardinals	3–2	**Anderson** (1–3)	Mikolas (11–12)	**Díaz** (7)	Busch Stadium	44,901	57–86	W1
144	September 16	@ Cardinals	5–6	Stratton (9–4)	**Gibaut** (1–2)	Helsley (18)	Busch Stadium	47,118	57–87	L1
145	September 17 (1)	@ Cardinals	1–5	Hudson (8−7)	**Minor** (4−12)	—	Busch Stadium	46,678	57–88	L2
146	September 17 (2)	@ Cardinals	0–1 (11)	Matz (5–3)	**Cruz** (0–1)	—	Busch Stadium	48,299	57–89	L3
147	September 18	@ Cardinals	3–0	**Cessa** (4–3)	Montgomery (8–5)	**Farmer** (2)	Busch Stadium	47,909	58–89	W1
148	September 20	Red Sox	3–5	Bello (2–6)	**Lodolo** (4–7)	Schreiber (8)	**Great American Ball Park**	16,698	58–90	L1
149	September 21	Red Sox	5–1	**Anderson** (2–3)	Seabold (0–3)	**Díaz** (8)	**Great American Ball Park**	13,074	59–90	W1
150	September 22	Brewers	1–5	Woodruff (12–4)	**Greene** (4–13)	—	**Great American Ball Park**	9,889	59–91	L1
151	September 23	Brewers	3–5	Perdomo (3–0)	**Cessa** (4–4)	Williams (14)	**Great American Ball Park**	16,658	59–92	L2
152	September 24	Brewers	2–10	Burnes (11–8)	**Ashcraft** (5–4)	—	**Great American Ball Park**	20,472	59–93	L3
153	September 25	Brewers	2–1	**Farmer** (2–1)	Bush (2–3)	**Díaz** (9)	**Great American Ball Park**	19,952	60–93	W1
154	September 26	@ Pirates	3–8	Ramírez (2–1)	**Law** (2–2)	—	PNC Park	8,766	60–94	L1
155	September 27	@ Pirates	1–4	Crowe (6–10)	**Farmer** (2–2)	Bednar (18)	PNC Park	8,723	60–95	L2
156	September 28	@ Pirates	3–4 (10)	Ramírez (3–1)	**Díaz** (6–3)	—	PNC Park	9,127	60–96	L3
157	September 30	@ Cubs	1–6	Sampson (4–5)	**Ashcraft** (5–5)	—	Wrigley Field	24,297	60–97	L4

October: 2–3 (Home: 2–1; Away: 0–2)

#	Date	Opponent	Score	Win	Loss	Save	Stadium	Attendance	Record	Streak
158	October 1	@ Cubs	1–2	Miley (2–2)	**Law** (2–3)	Hughes (8)	Wrigley Field	31,256	60–98	L5
159	October 2	@ Cubs	1–8	Stroman (6–7)	**Anderson** (2–4)	—	Wrigley Field	30,029	60–99	L6
160	October 3	Cubs	3–1	**Greene** (5–13)	Wesneski (3–2)	**Díaz** (10)	**Great American Ball Park**	11,291	61–99	W1
161	October 4	Cubs	3–2	**Díaz** (7–3)	Hughes (2–3)	—	**Great American Ball Park**	13,738	62–99	W2
162	October 5	Cubs	2–15	Alzolay (2–1)	**Ashcraft** (5–6)	—	**Great American Ball Park**	12,437	62–100	L1

Legend: = Win = Loss = Postponement
Bold = Reds team member

== Roster ==
2022 Cincinnati Reds
Roster
Pitchers: 48 Chase Anderson; 51 Graham Ashcraft; 58 Luis Castillo; 85 Luis Cessa; 63 Fernando Cruz; 75 Ross Detwiler; 43 Alexis Díaz; 63 Phillip Diehl; 72 Kyle Dowdy; 41 Daniel Duarte; 76 Robert Dugger; 38 Justin Dunn; 75 Raynel Espinal; 46 Buck Farmer; 32 Luke Farrell; 79 Ian Gibaut; 21 Hunter Greene; 53 Vladimir Gutiérrez; 68 Ryan Hendrix; 23 Jeff Hoffman; 66 Joel Kuhnel; 58 Derek Law; 40 Nick Lodolo; 35 Alejo López; 30 Tyler Mahle; 31 Mike Minor; 55 Dauri Moreta; 71 Connor Overton; 52 Reiver Sanmartín; 64 Tony Santillan; 39 Lucas Sims; 84 Jared Solomon; 54 Hunter Strickland; 77 Art Warren; 34 Justin Wilson; 67 T. J. Zeuch	Catchers: 33 Aramis Garcia; 47 Mark Kolozsvary; 72 Chris Okey; 26 Michael Papierski; 73 Chuckie Robinson; 28 Austin Romine; 37 Tyler Stephenson; Infielders: 2 José Barrero; 22 Brandon Drury; 17 Kyle Farmer; 6 Jonathan India; 28 Alejo López; 16 Colin Moran; 94 Taylor Motter; 9 Mike Moustakas; 4 Matt Reynolds; 57 J. T. Riddle; 7 Donovan Solano; 12 Spencer Steer; 19 Joey Votto	Outfielders: 3 Albert Almora Jr.; 44 Aristides Aquino; 57 Stuart Fairchild; 27 Jake Fraley; 29 TJ Friedl; 12 Tyler Naquin; 28 Tommy Pham; 32 Max Schrock; 15 Nick Senzel; 67 Mike Siani; Other batters: 82 Ronnie Dawson	Manager: 25 David Bell; Coaches: 92 Kyle Arnsberg (assistant coach); 45 Freddie Benavides (bench); 90 Delino DeShields (first base/infield); 91 Jose Duarte (bullpen catcher); 56 J. R. House (third base/catching); 65 Eric Jagers (assistant pitching); 36 Derek Johnson (director of pitching); 62 Joel McKeithan (assistant hitting/offensive coordinator); 89 Cristian Perez (assistant bullpen/advance scouting); 61 Jeff Pickler (game planning/outfield); 60 Lee Tunnell (bullpen); 88 Rolando Valles (associate); 59 Alan Zinter (hitting)

== Statistics ==
=== Batting ===
(through October 5, 2022)
Players in bold are on the active roster.
Note: G = Games played; AB = At bats; R = Runs; H = Hits; 2B = Doubles; 3B = Triples; HR = Home runs; RBI = Runs batted in; SB = Stolen bases; BB = Walks; K = Strikeouts; Avg. = Batting average; OBP = On-base percentage; SLG = Slugging percentage; TB = Total bases

Player	G	AB	R	H	2B	3B	HR	RBI	SB	BB	K	AVG	OBP	SLG	TB
Albert Almora	64	215	26	48	10	1	5	29	3	17	46	.223	.282	.349	75
**Aristides Aquino**	80	259	24	51	13	0	10	30	2	17	101	.197	.246	.363	94
José Barrero	48	165	13	25	3	0	2	10	4	9	76	.152	.195	.206	34
Ronnie Dawson	1	3	0	0	0	0	0	0	0	0	2	.000	.000	.000	0
Brandon Drury	92	350	62	96	22	2	20	59	2	29	84	.274	.335	.520	182
**Stuart Fairchild**	38	86	13	24	4	1	5	6	0	8	29	.279	.374	.523	45
**Kyle Farmer**	145	526	58	134	25	1	14	78	4	33	99	.255	.315	.386	203
Jake Fraley	68	216	33	56	9	0	12	28	4	26	54	.259	.344	.468	101
**TJ Friedl**	72	225	33	54	10	5	8	25	7	20	40	.240	.314	.436	98
**Aramis Garcia**	47	108	6	23	2	0	1	4	0	3	34	.213	.248	.259	28
Jonathan India	103	386	48	96	16	2	10	41	3	31	94	.249	.327	.378	146
Mark Kolozsvary	10	20	3	4	2	0	1	3	0	1	9	.200	.238	.450	9
**Alejo López**	59	145	15	38	5	1	1	10	3	9	21	.262	.314	.331	48
**Colin Moran**	42	109	11	23	3	0	5	23	0	16	30	.211	.305	.376	41
**Taylor Motter**	2	6	0	1	0	0	0	0	0	0	3	.167	.167	.167	1
**Mike Moustakas**	78	252	30	54	12	0	7	25	2	24	75	.214	.295	.345	87
**Tyler Naquin**	56	187	29	46	12	2	7	33	3	13	53	.246	.305	.444	83
Chris Okey	7	12	3	2	0	0	0	0	0	0	5	.167	.231	.167	2
Michael Papierski	34	82	6	13	1	0	1	4	0	9	22	.159	.242	.207	17
**Tommy Pham**	91	340	57	81	11	1	11	39	7	42	100	.238	.320	.374	127
**Matt Reynolds**	92	244	31	60	10	1	3	23	5	26	78	.246	.320	.332	81
J. T. Riddle	2	4	0	1	0	0	0	0	0	0	1	.250	.250	.250	1
**Chuckie Robinson**	25	59	3	8	2	0	2	5	0	0	17	.136	.136	.271	16
**Austin Romine**	37	95	8	14	2	0	3	9	0	2	36	.147	.173	.263	25
Reiver Sanmartín	1	2	0	0	0	0	0	0	0	0	1	.000	.000	.000	0
Max Schrock	13	26	1	4	0	0	0	1	0	1	6	.154	.185	.154	4
Nick Senzel	110	379	45	86	13	0	5	25	8	30	76	.231	.296	.306	114
**Mike Siani**	9	24	1	4	0	0	0	0	0	0	7	.167	.167	.167	4
Donovan Solano	80	278	22	79	16	0	4	24	0	19	61	.284	.339	.385	107
**Spencer Steer**	28	95	12	20	5	0	2	8	0	11	26	.211	.306	.326	31
**Tyler Stephenson**	50	166	24	53	9	0	6	35	1	12	47	.319	.372	.482	80
**Joey Votto**	91	322	31	66	18	1	11	41	0	44	97	.205	.319	.370	119
**TEAM TOTALS**	162	5330	648	1264	235	18	156	618	58	452	1430	.235	.304	.372	2003

=== Pitching ===
(through October 5, 2022)
Players in bold are on the active roster.
Note: W = Wins; L = Losses; ERA = Earned run average; WHIP = Walks plus hits per inning pitched; G = Games pitched; GS = Games started; SV = Saves; IP = Innings pitched; H = Hits allowed; R = Runs allowed; ER = Earned runs allowed; BB = Walks allowed; K = Strikeouts

Player	W	L	ERA	WHIP	G	GS	SV	IP	H	R	ER	BB	K
Chase Anderson	2	4	6.38	1.33	9	7	0	24.0	17	18	17	15	23
**Graham Ashcraft**	5	6	4.89	1.42	19	19	0	105.0	119	61	57	30	71
**Luis Castillo**	4	4	2.86	1.07	14	14	0	85.0	63	30	27	28	90
**Luis Cessa**	4	4	4.57	1.29	46	10	0	80.2	76	44	41	28	59
**Fernando Cruz**	0	1	1.23	1.23	14	2	0	14.2	9	3	2	9	21
Ross Detwiler	0	2	4.44	1.56	30	0	1	26.1	31	13	13	10	28
**Alexis Díaz**	7	3	1.84	0.96	59	0	10	63.2	28	18	13	33	83
Phil Diehl	0	0	11.12	1.94	5	0	0	5.2	8	7	7	3	3
Kyle Dowdy	0	0	0.00	1.26	2	0	0	6.1	5	0	0	3	3
Daniel Duarte	0	0	10.13	2.25	3	0	0	2.2	3	3	3	3	2
Robert Dugger	0	1	6.75	1.69	3	1	0	10.2	11	8	8	7	12
**Justin Dunn**	1	3	6.10	1.58	7	7	0	31.0	32	21	21	17	21
Raynel Espinal	0	1	7.71	1.50	2	0	0	4.2	6	4	4	1	5
**Buck Farmer**	2	2	3.83	1.30	44	0	2	47.0	36	21	20	25	54
Luke Farrell	0	0	9.00	2.50	2	0	0	4.0	6	5	4	4	5
**Ian Gibaut**	1	2	4.67	1.62	33	0	1	34.2	38	18	18	18	48
**Hunter Greene**	5	13	4.44	1.21	24	24	0	125.2	104	64	62	48	164
**Vladimir Gutiérrez**	1	6	7.61	1.91	10	8	0	36.2	46	31	31	24	29
Ryan Hendrix	0	0	5.40	1.80	9	0	0	8.1	9	5	5	6	94
**Jeff Hoffman**	2	0	3.83	1.41	35	1	0	44.2	40	22	19	23	45
Joel Kuhnel	2	3	6.36	1.40	53	0	1	58.0	67	41	41	14	56
**Derek Law**	2	2	4.08	1.47	15	0	0	17.2	19	8	8	7	15
Nick Lodolo	4	7	3.66	1.25	19	19	0	103.2	90	44	42	39	131
**Alejo López**	0	0	6.75	0.75	3	0	0	2.2	2	2	2	0	0
Tyler Mahle	5	7	4.40	1.25	19	19	0	104.1	91	53	51	39	114
Mike Minor	4	12	6.06	1.63	19	19	0	98.0	120	72	66	40	76
Dauri Moreta	0	2	5.40	1.17	35	1	1	38.1	32	24	23	13	39
**Connor Overton**	1	0	2.73	0.97	6	4	0	33.0	21	10	10	11	14
**Matt Reynolds**	0	0	6.75	2.25	2	0	0	1.1	3	1	1	0	0
Reiver Sanmartín	4	4	6.32	1.67	45	4	0	57.0	66	43	40	29	47
**Tony Santillan**	0	1	5.49	1.78	21	0	4	19.2	23	14	12	12	21
Max Schrock	0	0	45.00	7.00	1	0	0	1.0	7	5	5	0	0
Lucas Sims	1	0	9.45	1.65	6	0	1	6.2	5	7	7	6	5
**Jared Solomon**	0	0	10.80	1.56	9	0	0	8.1	8	10	10	5	9
**Hunter Strickland**	3	3	4.91	1.51	66	0	7	62.1	61	37	34	33	60
**Art Warren**	2	3	6.50	1.64	39	0	3	36.0	37	29	26	22	40
Justin Wilson	0	1	2.45	0.82	5	0	0	3.2	3	1	1	0	7
TJ Zeuch	0	3	15.19	2.91	3	3	0	10.2	24	18	18	7	5
**TEAM TOTALS**	62	100	4.86	1.39	162	162	31	1423.1	1366	815	768	612	1414

== Farm system ==
Level	Team	League	Manager
AAA	Louisville Bats	International League	Pat Kelly
AA	Chattanooga Lookouts	Southern League	Jose Moreno
High-A	Dayton Dragons	Midwest League	Bryan LaHair
Low-A	Daytona Tortugas	Florida State League	Gookie Dawkins
Rookie	ACL Reds	Arizona Complex League	Julio Morillo
Foreign Rookie	DSL Reds	Dominican Summer League	Gustavo Molina
