= Russel Gibaut =

Jersey cricketer

Personal information
- Full name: Russel Philip Gibaut
- Born: 5 March 1963 (age 63); Saint Saviour, Jersey
- Batting: Right-handed
- Bowling: Right-arm medium

Domestic team information
- Years: Team
- 1983: Oxford University

Career statistics
Competition	First-class
Matches	2
Runs scored	7
Batting average	3.50
100s/50s	–/–
Top score	7
Catches/stumpings	–/–
- Source: Cricinfo, 23 March 2020

Russel Philip Gibaut (born 5 March 1963) is a Jersey former first-class cricketer.

Gibaut was born at Saint Saviour in Jersey. He studied at Hertford College, Oxford where he played two first-class cricket matches for Oxford University in 1983, against Lancashire and Glamorgan. He later emigrated to the United States, where he worked in the oil industry. His son is the Major League Baseball player Ian Gibaut.
