= Héctor Rodríguez (outfielder) =

Dominican baseball player (born 2004)

Cincinnati Reds – No. 43
- Outfielder
- Born: March 11, 2004 (age 22); Santo Domingo, Dominican Republic
- Bats: Left Throws: Right

MLB debut
- August 4, 2026, for the Cincinnati Reds

MLB statistics (through 2026 season)
- Batting average: .229
- Home runs: 6
- Runs batted in: 17
- Stats at Baseball Reference

Teams
- Cincinnati Reds (2026–present)

Héctor Junior Rodríguez (born March 11, 2004) is a Dominican professional baseball outfielder for the Cincinnati Reds of Major League Baseball (MLB). He made his MLB debut in 2026.

== Professional career ==
Rodríguez signed with the New York Mets as an international free agent in January 2021. He made his professional debut that season with the Dominican Summer League Mets.

On July 28, 2022, the Mets traded Rodríguez and Jose Acuña to the Cincinnati Reds for Tyler Naquin and Phillip Diehl. He started his Reds career that year with the Arizona Complex League Reds and Daytona Tortugas. In 2023, he played with Daytona and the Dayton Dragons.

Rodríguez played 2024 with Dayton and started 2025 with the Chattanooga Lookouts. On November 18, 2025, the Reds added Rodríguez to their 40-man roster to protect him from the Rule 5 draft.

Rodríguez was optioned to the Triple-A Louisville Bats to begin the 2026 season. Following the trade of Nathaniel Lowe to the Cleveland Guardians, Rodríguez was called up to the Reds to debut on August 4 against the Athletics. Rodriguez got his first hit on August 7 versus the Athletics - a double. He hit his first home run on August 23 against the Arizona Diamondbacks.
