= Chuckie Robinson =

American baseball player (born 1994)

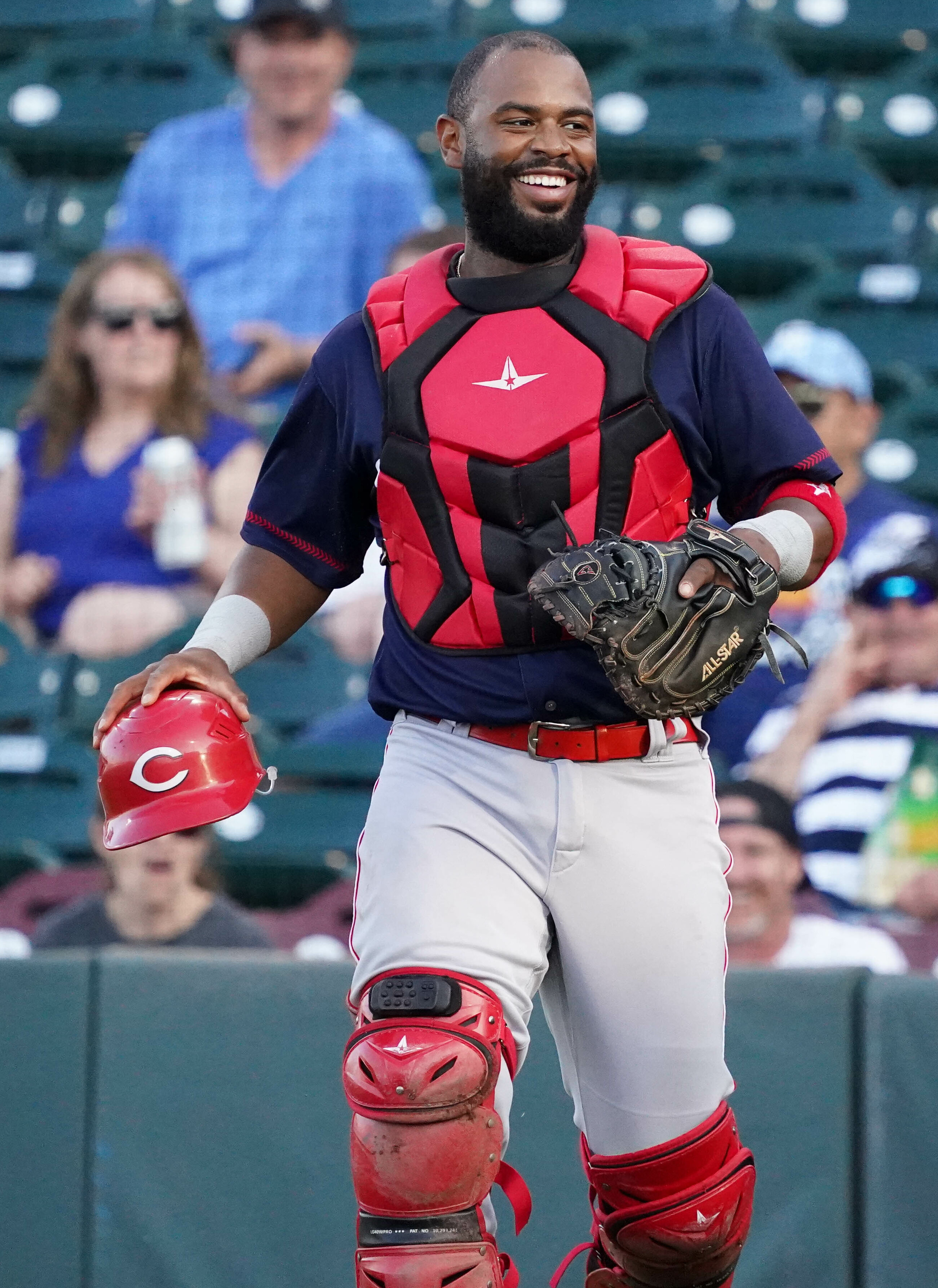
- Robinson with the Louisville Bats in 2023

Atlanta Braves
- Catcher
- Born: December 14, 1994 (age 31); Danville, Illinois, U.S.
- Bats: Right Throws: Right

MLB debut
- August 24, 2022, for the Cincinnati Reds

MLB statistics (through 2026 season)
- Batting average: .128
- Home runs: 2
- Runs batted in: 6
- Stats at Baseball Reference

Teams
- Cincinnati Reds (2022); Chicago White Sox (2024); Los Angeles Dodgers (2025–2026)

Charles Robinson III (born December 14, 1994) is an American professional baseball catcher in the Atlanta Braves organization. He has previously played in Major League Baseball (MLB) for the Cincinnati Reds, Chicago White Sox, and Los Angeles Dodgers.

== Amateur career ==
Robinson grew up in Danville, Illinois, and attended Danville High School.

Robinson attended the University of Southern Mississippi and played college baseball for the Southern Miss Golden Eagles for three seasons. He was the team's backup catcher during his first two seasons with the team. After his sophomore season, he played collegiate summer baseball with the Ocean State Waves of the New England Collegiate Baseball League. As a junior, Robinson batted .288 with seven home runs and 44 runs batted in (RBIs) and was named first team All-Conference USA.

== Professional career ==
=== Houston Astros ===
The Houston Astros selected Robinson in the 21st round of the 2016 Major League Baseball draft. After signing with the team, he was assigned to the Tri-City ValleyCats of the New York–Penn League. Robinson spent the 2017 season with the Single–A Quad Cities River Bandits. He played for the Buies Creek Astros of the High–A Carolina League and batted .239 with seven home runs and 30 RBI. Robinson spent the 2019 season with the Double-A Corpus Christi Hooks and hit .217 with seven home runs and 36 RBI in 103 games played. After the season, he played winter league baseball for the Canberra Cavalry of the Australian Baseball League. Robinson did not play in a game in 2020 due to the cancellation of the minor league season because of the COVID-19 pandemic.

=== Cincinnati Reds ===
On December 10, 2020, the Cincinnati Reds selected Robinson in the minor league phase of the 2020 Rule 5 draft. He spent the 2021 season with the Double-A Chattanooga Lookouts and batted .248 with eight home runs and 24 RBI in 66 games played. Robinson was assigned to Chattanooga at the beginning of the 2022 season before being promoted to the Triple-A Louisville Bats.

Robinson was promoted to the Reds' major league roster on August 11, 2022. He made his Major League debut on August 24, starting at catcher and going 1–2 with one run scored in a 7–5 loss to the Philadelphia Phillies. Robinson's debut was the first time that an African-American player had started at catcher since Bruce Maxwell had in 2018. On August 29, Robinson hit his first career home run, a two–run shot off of St. Louis Cardinals starter Miles Mikolas. On October 15, Robinson was removed from the 40-man roster and sent outright to Triple–A Louisville. He elected free agency following the season on November 10. In 25 games for the Reds, he had eight hits in 59 at-bats (.136 average), hit two home runs and drove in five RBI.

On December 5, 2022, Robinson re–signed with the Reds on a minor league contract that included an invitation to spring training. He spent the 2023 season with Triple–A Louisville, playing in 101 games and had a slash line of .290/.356/.450 with 13 home runs, 74 RBI, and seven stolen bases. Robinson elected free agency following the season on November 6, 2023.

=== Chicago White Sox ===
On December 7, 2023, Robinson signed a minor league contract with the Chicago White Sox. On June 16, 2024, the White Sox added him to their 40–man roster and optioned him to the Triple–A Charlotte Knights. The transaction was performed to prevent him from opting out of his minor league contract. In 26 games for the White Sox, Robinson batted .129/.197/.129 with no home runs or RBI. He also played in 55 games for Charlotte, batting .246.

=== Los Angeles Angels ===
On December 18, 2024, Robinson was traded to the Los Angeles Angels in exchange for cash considerations. He was optioned to the Triple-A Salt Lake Bees to begin the 2025 season, where in 27 appearances he batted .272/.315/.388 with one home run and 18 RBI. Robinson was designated for assignment by Los Angeles on May 28.

=== Los Angeles Dodgers ===
On May 31, 2025, Robinson was claimed off waivers by the Los Angeles Dodgers. He did not play in a game for the organization before he was designated for assignment on June 3. Robinson cleared waivers and was sent outright to the Triple-A Oklahoma City Comets on June 5. He was added back to the major league roster on September 6. The Dodgers optioned Robinson back to Oklahoma City two days later, without him having appeared in a game. He played in 51 games for the Comets, batting .254 with four home runs and 30 RBI. Robinson also eventually appeared in one game for the Dodgers, on September 15, and was hitless in one official at-bat; he did reach on a fielders choice and scored a run.

On September 21, 2025, Robinson was claimed off waivers by the Atlanta Braves. On November 6, Robinson was removed from the 40-man roster and sent outright to Triple-A, but he chose to elect free agency instead.

On December 18, 2025, Robinson signed a minor league contract to return to the Dodgers organization. He was assigned to Oklahoma City to start the season and was called up to the Dodgers on June 11, 2026, when Will Smith was placed on the injured list. Robinson played in eight games for the team, where he had two hits in 23 at-bats. Robinson was later optioned to Triple–A and eventually designated for assignment on July 6; he cleared waivers and was sent outright back to Oklahoma City the following day. The Dodgers promoted Robinson back to the major leagues on August 3 only to designate him for assignment again the following day. He was released after clearing waivers on August 12.

=== Atlanta Braves ===
On August 18, 2026, Robinson signed a minor league contract with the Atlanta Braves. In 17 games with Triple-A Gwinnett Stripers he batted .229/.316/.333 with one home run and 7 RBIs.

== Personal life ==
Robinson's father, Charles Robinson Jr., played catcher in the minor leagues in the Kansas City Royals and Chicago Cubs organizations. His grandfather, Charles Robinson Sr., was also a minor league catcher in the Chicago White Sox organization.

== See also ==
- Rule 5 draft results
