= Tyler Naquin =

American baseball player (born 1991)

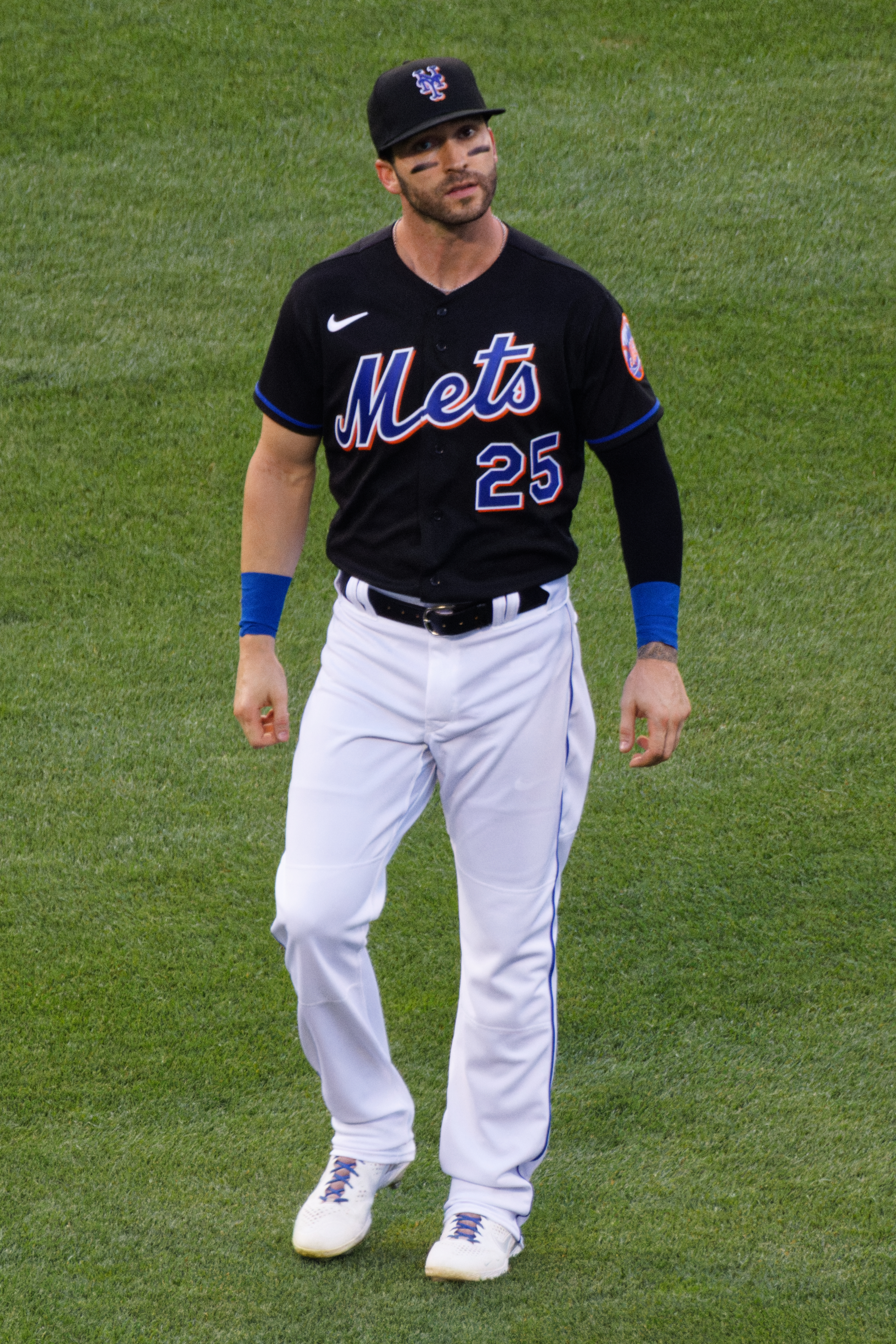
- Naquin with the New York Mets in 2022

Free agent
- Pitcher / Outfielder
- Born: April 24, 1991 (age 35); Spring, Texas, U.S.
- Bats: Left Throws: Right

MLB debut
- April 5, 2016, for the Cleveland Indians

MLB statistics (through 2023 season)
- Batting average: .263
- Home runs: 61
- Runs batted in: 237
- Stats at Baseball Reference

Teams
- Cleveland Indians (2016–2020); Cincinnati Reds (2021–2022); New York Mets (2022); Chicago White Sox (2023)

Tyler Wesley Naquin (/ˈnɒkæn/ NOK-an; born April 24, 1991) is an American professional baseball pitcher and outfielder who is a free agent. He has previously played in Major League Baseball (MLB) for the Cleveland Indians, Cincinnati Reds, New York Mets, and Chicago White Sox. He made his MLB debut in 2016. Prior to playing professionally, Naquin played college baseball for the Texas A&M Aggies. Originally an outfielder, Naquin transitioned to a pitcher prior to the 2025 season.

== Early life and amateur career ==
Naquin attended Klein Collins High School in unincorporated Harris County, Texas, where he played for the school's baseball team. He lettered in baseball for three years. He was twice honored as All-State, three times honored as All-District, and three times named All-Greater Houston. Naquin grew up a Houston Astros fan.

The Baltimore Orioles selected Naquin in the 33rd round of the 2009 Major League Baseball draft. After considering signing with the Orioles, Naquin decided to enroll at Texas A&M University, to play college baseball for the Texas A&M Aggies baseball team. Naquin was named the Big 12 Conference Baseball Player of the Year in 2011.

== Professional career ==
=== Cleveland Indians ===
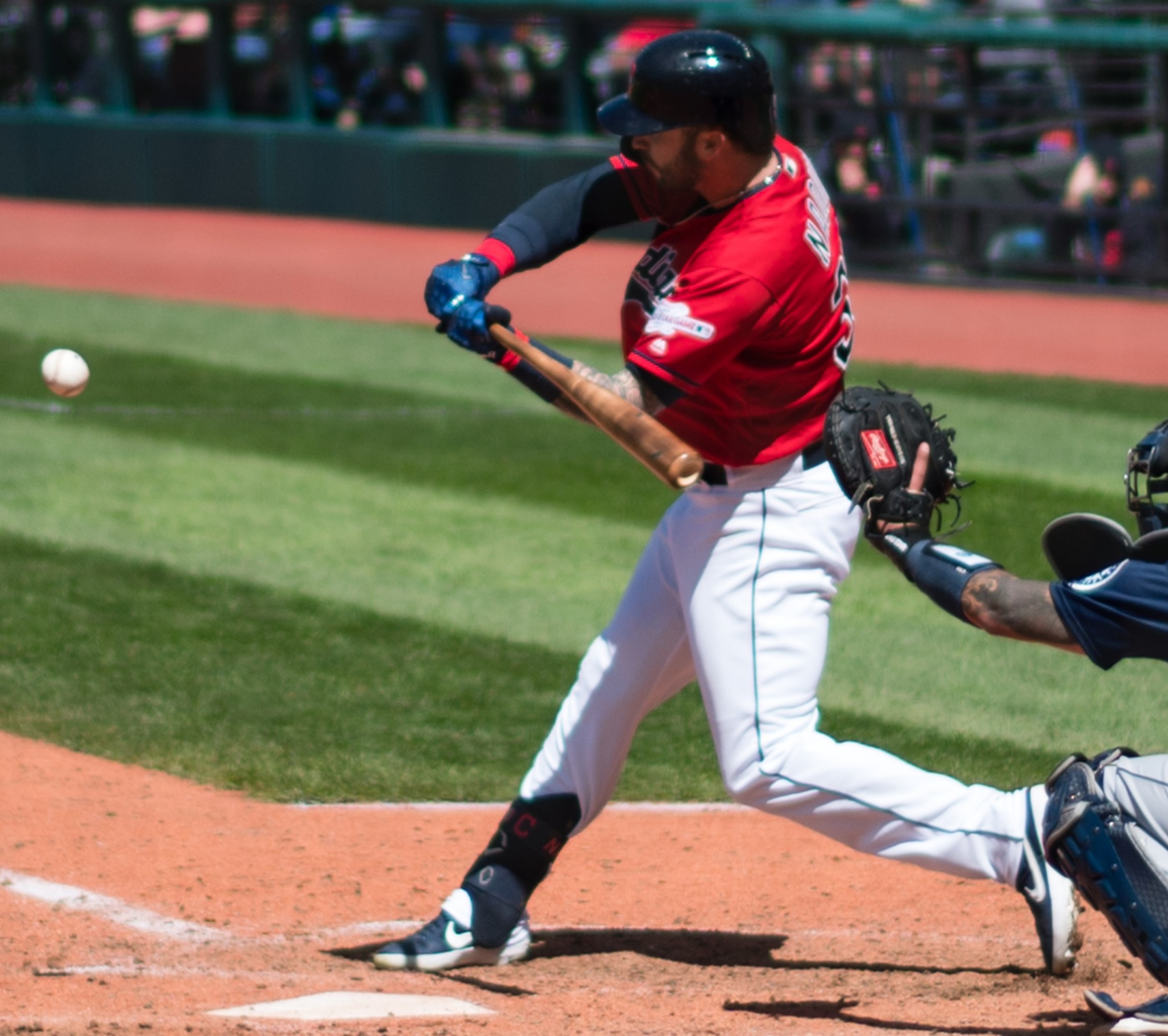
Naquin batting for the Cleveland Indians in 2019

The Cleveland Indians selected Naquin in the first round, with the 15th overall selection, of the 2012 Major League Baseball draft. He signed and made his professional debut that season with the Mahoning Valley Scrappers of the Low-A New York-Penn League, batting .270 in 36 games.

Naquin played for the Carolina Mudcats of the High-A Carolina League and the Akron Aeros of the Double-A Eastern League in 2013, hitting a combined .269 with ten home runs, 48 RBIs, and 15 stolen bases in 126 total games between both teams. After the 2013 season, the Indians assigned Naquin to the Arizona Fall League, and he participated in the Fall Stars Game. Naquin began the 2014 season with Akron, but suffered a broken hand in July. He required surgery, and missed the remainder of the 2014 season. In 76 games for Akron before his injury, he was batting .313 with four home runs and 30 RBIs. Naquin began the 2015 season with Akron. In June, the Indians promoted him to the Columbus Clippers of the Triple-A International League. However, a concussion and soreness in his right hip limited him to 50 games played with Columbus. In 84 games between Akron and Columbus, he slashed .300/.381/.446 with seven home runs and 27 RBIs. After the 2015 season, the Indians added Naquin to their 40-man roster.

After the 2015 season, Naquin remained at the Indians' facility in Arizona to engage in strength training. He competed for a spot on the Indians' 25-man roster during spring training in 2016, and was named to the Opening Day roster. Naquin was named the American League Rookie of the Month for June and July 2016. On August 19, Naquin hit a walk-off inside-the-park home run to lead the Indians to a 3–2 win over the Toronto Blue Jays. He became the first Indians batter to hit a walk off inside-the-park home run since Braggo Roth, who accomplished the feat in 1916. In 116 games, he hit .296 with 14 home runs, 43 RBIs and 18 doubles, finishing third in AL Rookie of the Year voting. He reached the 2016 World Series with Cleveland, where they lost in seven games to the Chicago Cubs. In Game 6, with two outs in the first inning, Naquin misplayed a fly ball with Lonnie Chisenhall, leading to two Cubs runs. He later struck out with the bases loaded, missing a key scoring chance for Cleveland as they lost 9–3.

Naquin began 2017 with Cleveland. However, he was hampered with injuries and struggled with the Indians, and he only appeared in 19 games for Cleveland in which he hit .216. He spent the majority of the year with Columbus, where he slashed .298/.359/.475 with ten home runs and 51 RBIs in 80 games. He played in 61 games for the Indians in 2018, hitting .264/.295/.356 with 3 home runs and 23 RBI.

In 2019 with Cleveland, Naquin played in 89 games, slashing .288/.325/.467 with 10 home runs, 34 RBI, and 4 stolen bases. Overall with the 2020 Cleveland Indians, Naquin batted .218 with four home runs and 20 RBIs in 40 games. Naquin was not tendered a contract for the 2021 season by the December 2, 2020, deadline, making him a free agent.

=== Cincinnati Reds ===
On February 18, 2021, Naquin signed a minor league contract with the Cincinnati Reds organization that included an invitation to spring training. On March 29, 2021, Naquin was selected to the 40-man roster.

Naquin appeared in 127 games with Cincinnati in 2021, finishing with a .270 batting average, 19 home runs, and 70 RBIs.

In 2022, Naquin appeared in 56 games for Cincinnati, posting a batting line of .246/.305/.444 with 7 home runs and 33 RBI.

=== New York Mets ===
On July 28, 2022, the Reds traded Naquin and Phillip Diehl to the New York Mets for minor league prospects Jose Acuña and Héctor Rodríguez. He played in 49 games for the Mets down the stretch, slashing .203/.246/.390 with four home runs and 13 RBIs.

=== Milwaukee Brewers ===
On February 21, 2023, Naquin signed a minor league contract with the Milwaukee Brewers organization. In 40 games for the Triple–A Nashville Sounds, he hit .284/.333/.432 with 6 home runs and 21 RBI.

=== Chicago White Sox ===
On August 7, 2023, Naquin was traded to the Chicago White Sox in exchange for cash considerations. In 28 games for the Triple–A Charlotte Knights, he batted .217/.294/.371 with 3 home runs and 9 RBI. On September 26, 2023, the White Sox selected Naquin's contract to the major league roster after Luis Robert Jr. suffered an injury. Appearing in 5 games for Chicago, he went hitless in 8 at-bats. Naquin was released by the White Sox on October 3 following the waiver claim of Alex Speas.

=== Cleveland Guardians ===
In January 2024, Naquin decided to convert from an outfielder to a pitcher. Naquin had last pitched as part of a scrimmage in 2010 while attending Texas A&M. He returned to the Aggies as a coaching assistant in 2024 while practicing his pitching. Naquin had previously been noted for his arm strength while playing the outfield, and became able to throw a 97 mile per hour fastball

On March 6, 2025, Naquin signed a minor league contract with the Cleveland Guardians as a pitcher. He made 27 appearances split between the rookie-level Arizona Complex League Guardians and High-A Lake County Captains, accumulating a 3-0 record and 6.16 ERA with 20 strikeouts across 30 2/3 innings pitched. Naquin elected free agency following the season on November 6.
