= Art Warren =

American baseball player (born 1993)

Kane County Cougars – No. 32
- Pitcher
- Born: March 23, 1993 (age 33); Defiance, Ohio, U.S.
- Bats: Right Throws: Right

MLB debut
- September 12, 2019, for the Seattle Mariners

MLB statistics (through 2022 season)
- Win–loss record: 6–3
- Earned run average: 4.19
- Strikeouts: 79
- Stats at Baseball Reference

Teams
- Seattle Mariners (2019); Cincinnati Reds (2021–2022)

Arthur Frank Warren (born March 23, 1993) is an American professional baseball pitcher for the Kane County Cougars of the American Association of Professional Baseball. He has previously played in Major League Baseball (MLB) for the Seattle Mariners and Cincinnati Reds.

== Career ==
Warren attended Napoleon High School in Napoleon, Ohio and played college baseball at the University of Cincinnati and Ashland University.

=== Seattle Mariners ===
Warren was drafted by the Seattle Mariners in the 23rd round (with the 695th overall selection) of the 2015 Major League Baseball draft.

Warren made his professional debut with the Arizona League Mariners and pitched seven innings for them, giving up three runs and striking out ten. He started 2016 with the Clinton LumberKings and was promoted to the Bakersfield Blaze during the season. In 27 total games between the two teams, he posted an 11–2 record with a 3.17 ERA. He pitched 2017 with Bakersfield where he pitched to a 3–1 record, 3.06 ERA, and 1.28 WHIP in 43 games. After the season pitched in the Arizona Fall League.

In 2018, Warren pitched for the Arkansas Travelers, going 1–2 with a 1.72 ERA in only 15 2/3 innings due to injury. He returned to Arkansas to begin 2019, going 2–1 with a 1.71 ERA.

The Mariners selected Warren's contract and promoted him to the major leagues on September 10, 2019. He made his major league debut on September 12 versus the Cincinnati Reds, pitching a scoreless 1/3 of an inning.

On October 21, 2020, Warren was claimed off waivers by the Texas Rangers. On December 26, Warren was designated for assignment by Texas.

=== Cincinnati Reds ===
On January 6, 2021, Warren was traded to the Cincinnati Reds in exchange for cash considerations. On August 11, Warren was placed on the 60-day injured list with an oblique injury. In 26 appearances for Cincinnati, he has logged a 1.29 ERA with 34 strikeouts in 21 innings of work.

On May 15, 2022, Warren relieved Hunter Greene in the eighth inning of a no-hitter against the Pittsburgh Pirates. Warren didn't allow a hit, but he allowed a run on a fielder's choice. The Pirates won the game 1-0 the next half inning, which prevented the no-hitter from becoming official due to the Pirates not needing to bat in the bottom of the ninth. On September 24, it was announced that Warren had undergone surgery to repair UCL damage in his throwing elbow. On November 15, Warren was designated for assignment. On November 18, he was non–tendered and became a free agent.

=== New York Yankees ===
On December 13, 2022, Warren signed a two–year minor league contract with the New York Yankees. He returned to action in 2024, making 28 appearances split between the Single–A Tampa Tarpons and Triple–A Scranton/Wilkes-Barre RailRiders and accumulating an 8.51 ERA with 35 strikeouts across 30 2/3 innings pitched. Warren was released by the Yankees organization on August 3, 2024.

=== Tecolotes de los Dos Laredos ===
On May 12, 2025, Warren signed with the Tecolotes de los Dos Laredos of the Mexican League. In 16 appearances for Dos Laredos, he logged a 1–1 record and 5.40 ERA with 15 strikeouts and one save across 13 1/3 innings pitched. On June 25, Warren was released by the Tecolotes.

=== Gastonia Ghost Peppers ===
On July 3, 2025, Warren signed with the Gastonia Ghost Peppers of the Atlantic League of Professional Baseball. He made 18 appearances for the Ghost Peppers, registering a 3–0 record and 3.60 ERA with 28 strikeouts and one save across 20 innings of relief. He became a free agent following the season.

=== Kane County Cougars ===
Ahead of the 2026 season, Warren was loaned to the Kane County Cougars of the American Association of Professional Baseball to compete at the 2026 Baseball Champions League Americas. On May 14, 2026, Warren officially signed with the Cougars.
