= Alexis Díaz (baseball) =

Puerto Rican baseball player (born 1996)

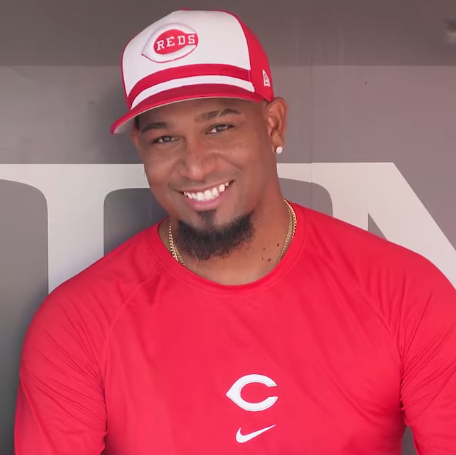
- Díaz with the Cincinnati Reds in 2024

Free agent
- Pitcher
- Born: September 28, 1996 (age 30); Humacao, Puerto Rico
- Bats: Right Throws: Right

MLB debut
- April 8, 2022, for the Cincinnati Reds

MLB statistics (through 2025 season)
- Win–loss record: 19–14
- Earned run average: 3.38
- Strikeouts: 241
- Saves: 75
- Stats at Baseball Reference

Teams
- Cincinnati Reds (2022–2025); Los Angeles Dodgers (2025); Atlanta Braves (2025)

Career highlights and awards
- All-Star (2023)

Alexis Omar Díaz (born September 28, 1996) is a Puerto Rican professional baseball pitcher who is a free agent. He has previously played in MLB for the Cincinnati Reds, Los Angeles Dodgers, and Atlanta Braves. The Reds selected Díaz in the 12th round of the 2015 MLB draft and he made his MLB debut in 2022.

== Career ==
=== Cincinnati Reds ===
Díaz was drafted by the Cincinnati Reds in the 12th round of the 2015 Major League Baseball draft. He made his professional debut for the Arizona League Reds that same year, appearing in nine games. Díaz underwent Tommy John surgery in May 2016, which kept him sidelined for the entire season. He returned to the Arizona League in 2017 and pitched to a 4.94 ERA with 40 strikeouts in 13 appearances. In 2018, Díaz was promoted to the rookie-level Greeneville Reds, where he posted a 3–3 record and 3.02 ERA with 67 strikeouts in 11 games (nine of them starts). In 2019, with the Single-A Dayton Dragons, he logged a 7–4 record and 5.18 ERA with 74 strikeouts in 57 1/3 innings pitched across 25 appearances. Díaz did not play in a game in 2020 due to the cancellation of the minor league season because of the COVID-19 pandemic. In 2021, he played for the Double-A Chattanooga Lookouts, posting a 3.83 ERA with 70 strikeouts in 42 1/3 innings across 35 contests.

The Reds added Díaz to their 40-man roster following the 2021 season on November 19, 2021. On April 7, 2022, it was announced that he had made the Opening Day roster out of Spring Training. Díaz made his major league debut the following day against the Atlanta Braves, tossing a scoreless inning and collecting his first two strikeouts (Adam Duvall and Travis d'Arnaud). He earned his first save on May 17, 2022, in the tenth inning against the Cleveland Guardians. He finished the season with a 7–3 record, 1.84 ERA, 83 strikeouts and 10 saves in 59 games.

In 2023, Díaz became entrenched as the Reds closer and was selected to the 2023 Major League Baseball All-Star Game. He pitched in 71 games, with a 9–6 record, 3.07 ERA, 86 strikeouts and 37 saves. In 2024, he saved 28 games in 60 appearances with a 3.99 ERA. However his strikeout totals were down, with only 55 in 56 1/3 innings.

After the 2024 season, Díaz and the Reds agreed to a $4.5 million contract for the following season in his first year of salary arbitration. He suffered a hamstring injury early in spring training and began the 2025 season on the injured list. He struggled in his return to the lineup, allowing eight runs, including four home runs, in just six innings of work, while walking five and only striking out three. He gave up three of those home runs in one inning on April 30 against the St. Louis Cardinals and was optioned to the Triple-A Louisville Bats the following day. In 13 2/3 innings in the minors, he allowed 14 hits while issuing 12 walks, surrendering seven runs for a 4.61 ERA.

=== Los Angeles Dodgers ===
On May 29, 2025, the Reds traded Díaz to the Los Angeles Dodgers in exchange for minor league pitcher Mike Villani. The Dodgers sent him to their training complex in Arizona to work on his mechanics. After a short stretch there, he pitched in six games for the Triple-A Oklahoma City Comets before being called up to the Dodgers on July 8. He did not pitch that day and was optioned back to Triple-A the following day. He made his debut with the Dodgers against the Minnesota Twins on July 22 and pitched in nine games for the Dodgers, allowing five runs in nine innings. He also pitched 10 innings over 11 games for Oklahoma City, with a 8.10 ERA. Díaz was designated for assignment by the Dodgers on September 4.

=== Atlanta Braves ===
On September 7, 2025, the Atlanta Braves claimed Díaz off waivers from the Dodgers. He made three appearances for Atlanta, but struggled to a 10.13 ERA with five strikeouts across 2 2/3 innings pitched. On October 1, Díaz was removed from the 40-man roster and sent outright to the Triple-A Gwinnett Stripers; he elected free agency the following day.

=== Texas Rangers ===
On December 16, 2025, Diaz signed a one-year contract with the Texas Rangers. The Rangers designated him for assignment on March 13, 2026. On March 15, Díaz cleared waivers and was sent outright to the Triple-A Round Rock Express. In 44 games with Triple-A Round Rock Express he threw 45.1 innings of relief going 1-2 with a 2.58 ERA with 57 strikeouts and one save. He elected free agency on November 2.

== Personal life ==
Díaz's older brother, Edwin Díaz, is a professional baseball player who currently pitches for the Los Angeles Dodgers. Edwin earned a save on the same day that Díaz earned his first save, making them the third set of brothers to both earn a save on the same day in MLB history.
