= Phillip Diehl =

American baseball player (born 1994)

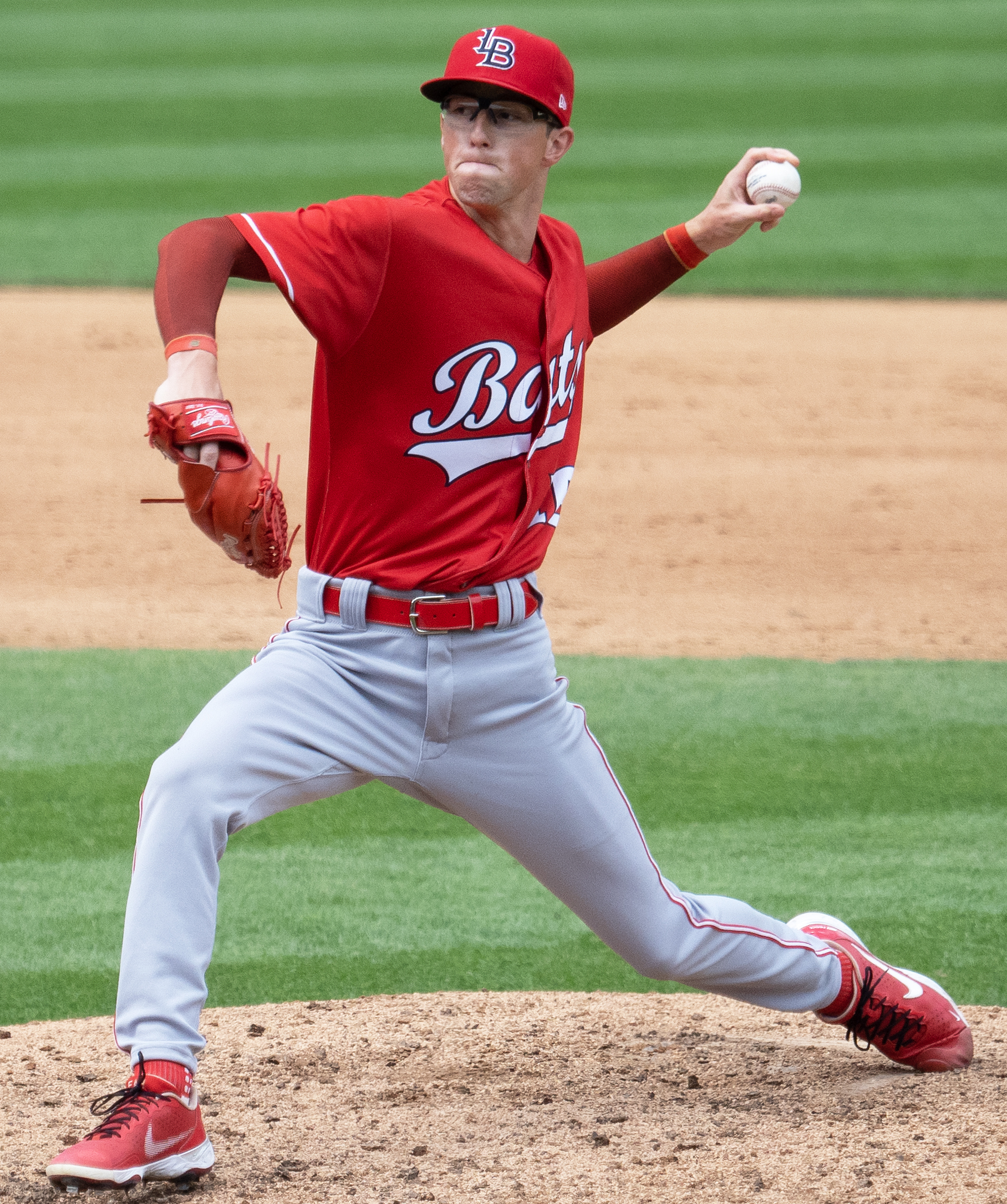
- Diehl with the Louisville Bats in 2022

Lancaster Stormers – No. 4
- Pitcher
- Born: July 16, 1994 (age 32); Cincinnati, Ohio, U.S.
- Bats: Left Throws: Left

MLB debut
- June 11, 2019, for the Colorado Rockies

MLB statistics (through 2022 season)
- Win–loss record: 0–0
- Earned run average: 9.47
- Strikeouts: 15
- Stats at Baseball Reference

Teams
- Colorado Rockies (2019–2020); Cincinnati Reds (2022)

Phillip Stewart Diehl (born July 16, 1994) is an American professional baseball pitcher for the Lancaster Stormers of the Atlantic League of Professional Baseball. He has previously played in Major League Baseball (MLB) for the Colorado Rockies and Cincinnati Reds.

== Amateur career ==
Diehl attended Moeller High School in Cincinnati, Ohio. In 2013, he enrolled at the University of Evansville and played college baseball for the Evansville Purple Aces. Diehl transferred to Wabash Valley College in Mount Carmel, Illinois, in 2014. He then transferred to Louisiana Tech University and played college baseball for the Louisiana Tech Bulldogs in 2015 and 2016. He missed the majority of the 2015 season with an arm injury.

== Professional career ==
=== New York Yankees ===
The New York Yankees selected Diehl in the 27th round of the 2016 MLB draft. He signed with the Yankees for $50,000 rather than return to college, and was assigned to the Staten Island Yankees of the Low–A New York-Penn League. He began the 2018 season with the Tampa Tarpons of the High–A Florida State League and was promoted to the Trenton Thunder of the Double–A Eastern League.

=== Colorado Rockies ===
On March 23, 2019, the Yankees traded Diehl to the Colorado Rockies in exchange for outfielder Mike Tauchman. After the trade, he played for the Hartford Yard Goats, and the Albuquerque Isotopes.

On June 10, 2019, his contract was selected and he was called up to the major leagues for the first time. He made his debut on June 11 versus the Chicago Cubs, allowing two runs in one inning of relief. On June 23, 2020, it was announced that Diehl had tested positive for COVID-19. He returned in time for the start of summer camp on July 4. In 2020, Diehl pitched six innings in as many games, allowing seven runs on seven hits for a 10.50 ERA with four strikeouts.

On April 10, 2021, Diehl was designated for assignment after Alan Trejo was added to the roster.

=== Cincinnati Reds ===
On April 14, 2021, Diehl was claimed off waivers by the Cincinnati Reds. On May 2, 2021, Diehl was designated for assignment by Cincinnati following the waiver claim of Ashton Goudeau. On May 4, Diehl was outrighted to the Triple-A Louisville Bats.

Diehl was assigned to Triple-A Louisville to begin the 2022 season. He recorded a 4.50 ERA and 0.75 WHIP in eight innings of work across eight relief appearances before he had his contract selected to Cincinnati's active roster on April 27, 2022. On May 9, Diehl was designated for assignment by Cincinnati. On May 12, he cleared waivers and was sent outright to Triple-A Louisville.

=== New York Mets ===
On July 28, 2022, the Reds traded Diehl and Tyler Naquin to the New York Mets for minor league prospects Jose Acuña and Héctor Rodríguez. Diehl made 13 appearances for the Triple-A Syracuse Mets to close out the year, but struggled to an 0–2 record and 8.27 ERA with nine strikeouts in 16 1/3 innings pitched. He elected free agency on October 9, 2022.

=== Cleveland Guardians ===
On February 7, 2023, Diehl signed a minor league contract with the Cleveland Guardians organization. In 24 games for the Triple–A Columbus Clippers, he struggled to a 6.89 ERA with 35 strikeouts in 32 2/3 innings pitched. On August 16, Diehl was released by Cleveland.

=== Lancaster Stormers ===
On June 4, 2024, Diehl signed with the Lancaster Stormers of the Atlantic League of Professional Baseball. In 41 games for Lancaster, he compiled a 4–3 record and 2.29 ERA with 50 strikeouts and 3 saves across 39 1/3 innings pitched.

On March 28, 2025, Diehl re-signed with the Stormers for a second season. He made 52 relief appearances for the Stormers, logging a 3-4 record and 3.74 ERA with 63 strikeouts and seven saves across 55 1/3 innings pitched.

On March 17, 2026, Diehl re-signed with the Stormers for his third season with the team.
