= Matt Reynolds (infielder) =

American baseball player (born 1990)

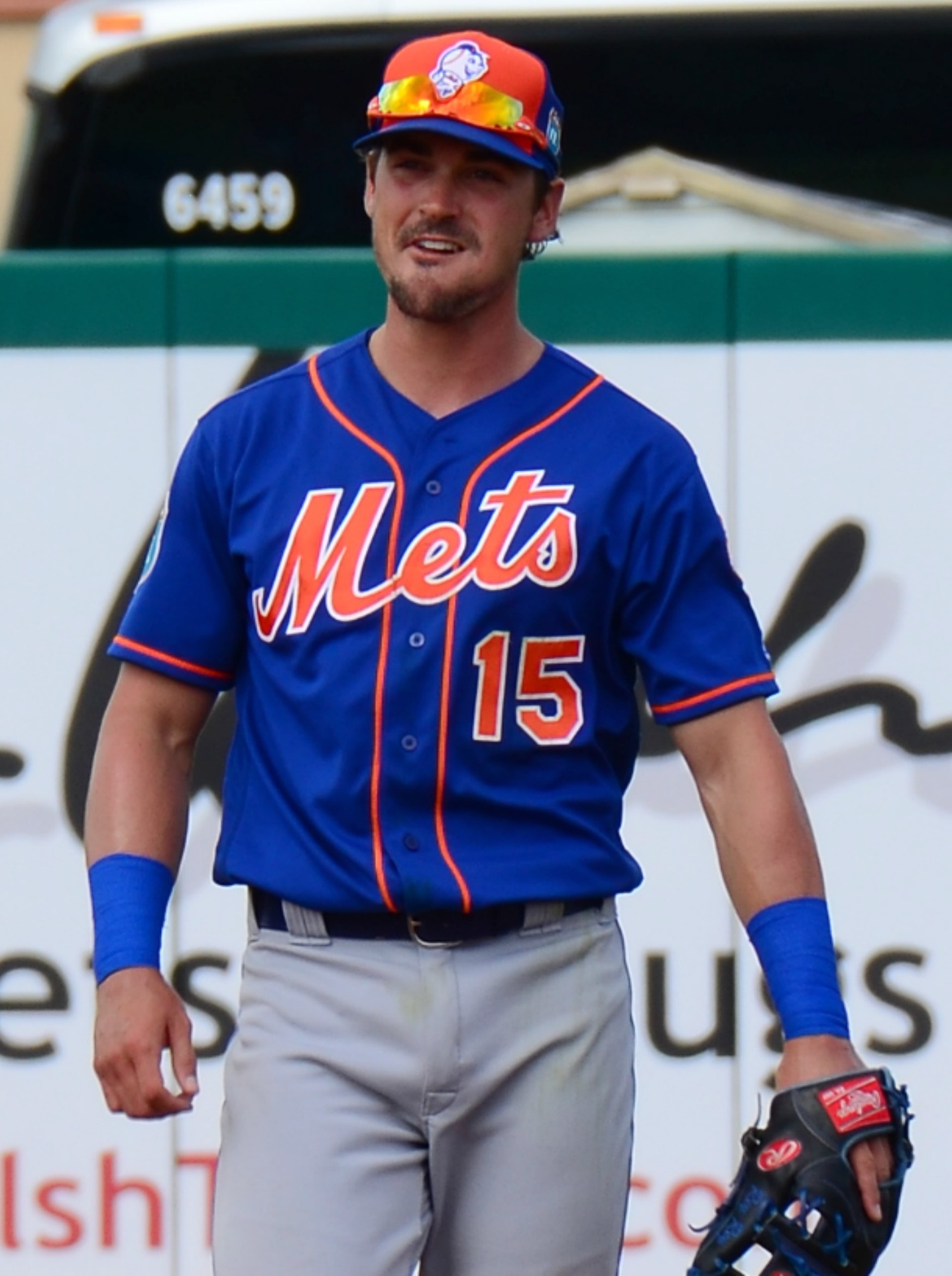
- Reynolds with the Mets in 2016
- Shortstop
- Born: December 3, 1990 (age 35); Tulsa, Oklahoma, U.S.
- Batted: Right Threw: Right

Professional debut
- MLB: May 17, 2016, for the New York Mets
- NPB: March 29, 2024, for the Hiroshima Toyo Carp

Last appearance
- MLB: May 2, 2023, for the Cincinnati Reds
- NPB: March 30, 2024, for the Hiroshima Toyo Carp

MLB statistics
- Batting average: .229
- Home runs: 7
- Runs batted in: 42

NPB statistics
- Batting average: .000
- Home runs: 0
- Runs batted in: 1
- Stats at Baseball Reference

Teams
- New York Mets (2016–2017); Washington Nationals (2018); Kansas City Royals (2020); New York Mets (2022); Cincinnati Reds (2022–2023); Hiroshima Toyo Carp (2024)

Matthew William Reynolds (born December 3, 1990) is an American former professional baseball infielder. He played in Major League Baseball (MLB) for the New York Mets, Washington Nationals, Kansas City Royals, and Cincinnati Reds. He also played in Nippon Professional Baseball (NPB) for the Hiroshima Toyo Carp.

== High school and college career ==
Reynolds attended Bishop Kelley High School in Tulsa, Oklahoma. He played both baseball and basketball and received interest from Iowa State, Furman and Butler to play college basketball.

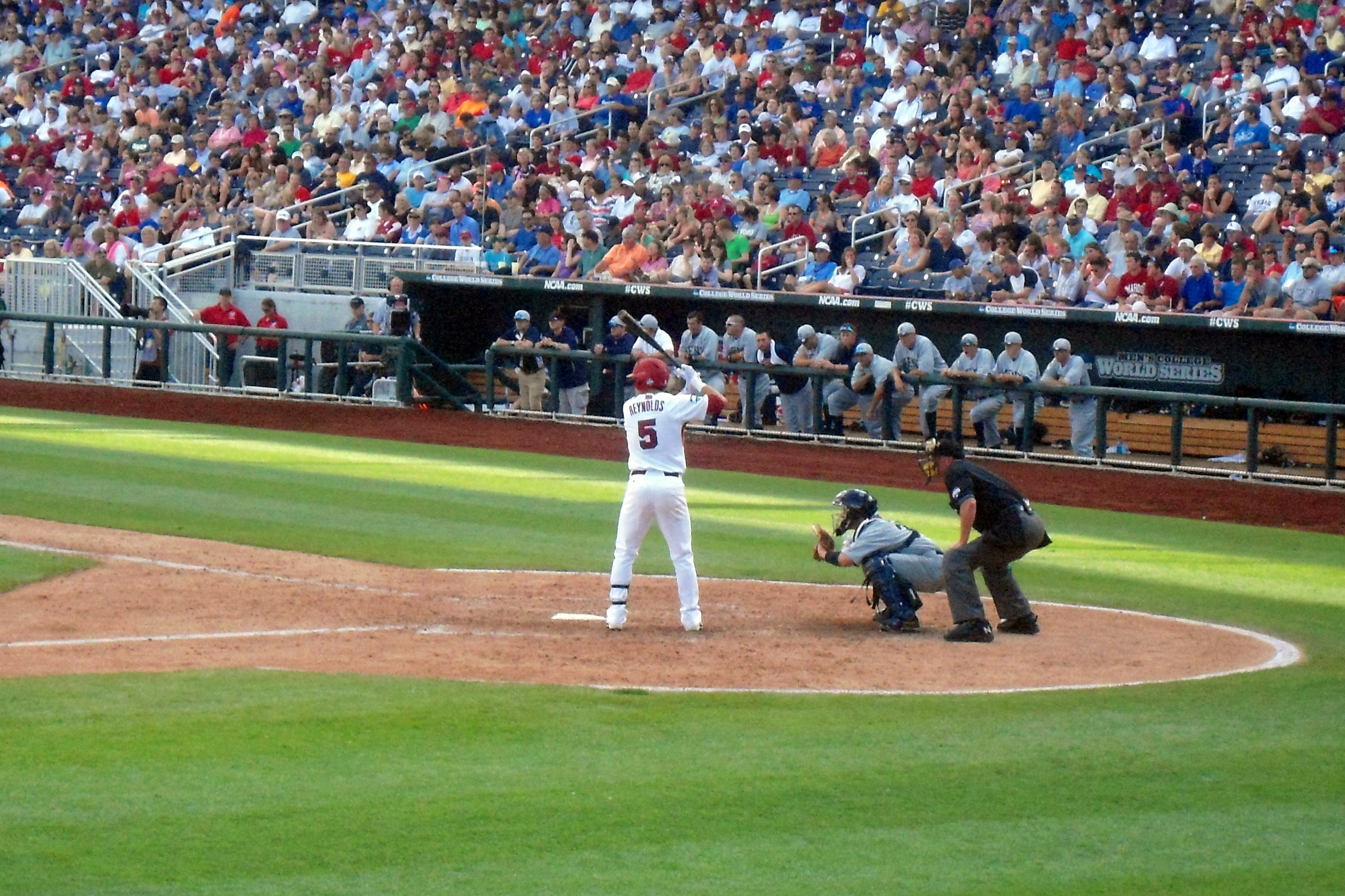
Reynolds bats at the 2012 College World Series

He decided, however, to play college baseball for the Arkansas Razorbacks at the University of Arkansas. He played for Arkansas as a third baseman from 2010 to 2012 and hit .275/.382/.413 with 11 home runs and 72 runs batted in 150 career games. After his sophomore season in 2011, he played collegiate summer baseball for the Yarmouth–Dennis Red Sox of the Cape Cod Baseball League.

== Professional career ==
=== New York Mets ===
Reynolds was drafted by the New York Mets in the second round of the 2012 Major League Baseball draft. The Mets moved Reynolds to shortstop after he signed. He made his professional debut that season for the Savannah Sand Gnats of the A-level South Atlantic League, hitting .259 with 3 home runs in 42 games.

In 2013, Reynolds played in 117 games for the High-A Florida State League, and one game for the Double-A Binghamton Mets. He hit a disappointing .225/.300/.335 with five home runs in 436 at bats. Reynolds started the 2014 season back with Binghamton and was promoted to the Triple-A Las Vegas 51s after hitting .355 in 58 games. With the 51s, he finished 2015 batting .267/.319/.402, with 65 RBIs and 6 home runs in 115 games.

Reynolds spent the 2015 regular season in Triple-A before being called up to the Mets during the 2015 NLDS to replace the injured Rubén Tejada. In doing so, he became the first player in modern baseball history to be added to a postseason roster in the middle of a series without previous major-league experience. He also became the third player in modern baseball history to be included on a postseason roster without previous major-league experience, after Chet Trail (of the New York Yankees in the 1964 World Series (not on the active roster)) and Mark Kiger (of the Oakland Athletics in the 2006 American League Championship Series). He was dropped from the roster for the World Series, and did not appear in any games in the playoffs.

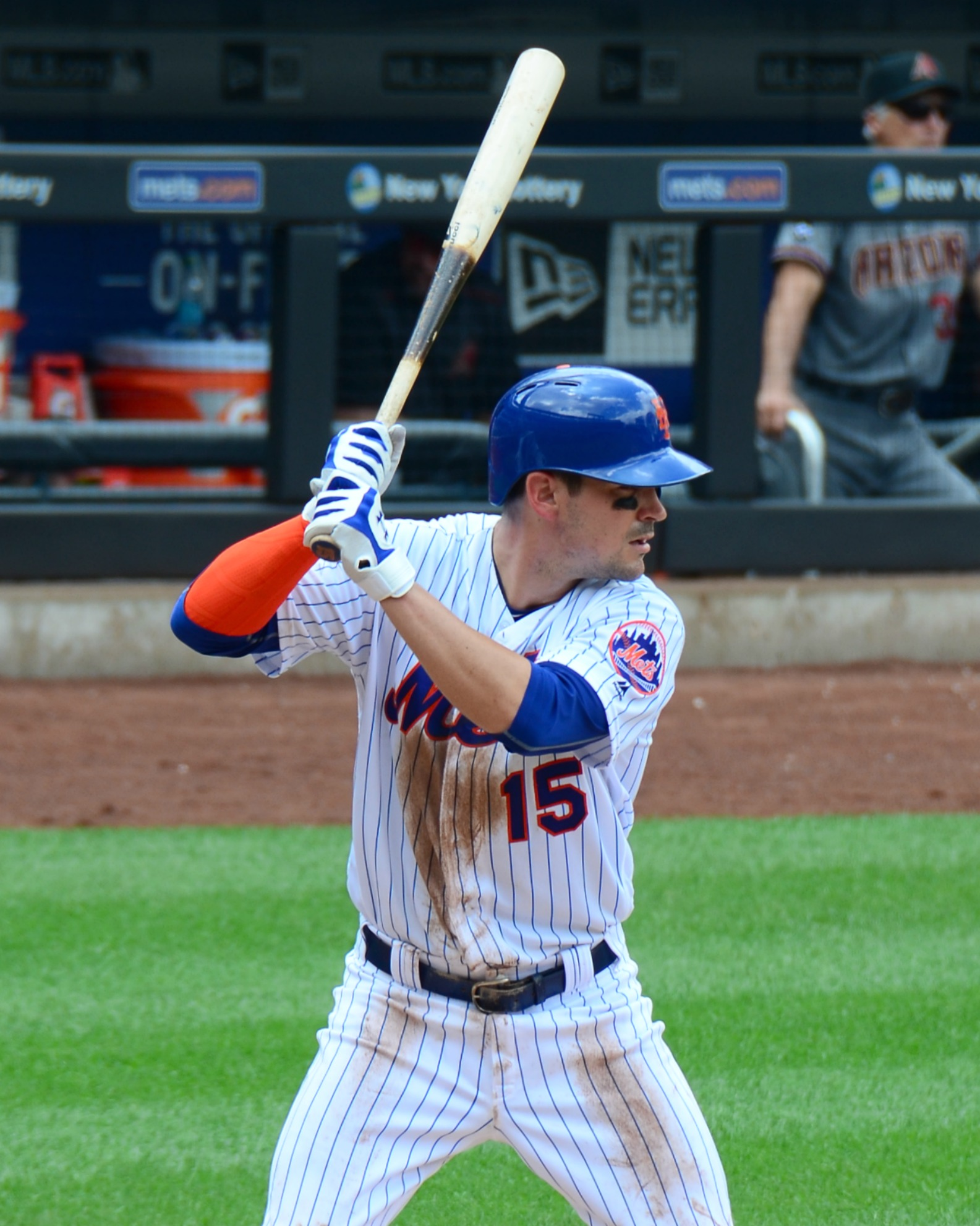
Reynolds as a rookie at Citi Field in 2016

The Mets promoted Reynolds to the major leagues on May 17, 2016. He made his major league debut at third base for the Mets that night. He went 0–3 with one strikeout. On May 25, Reynolds picked up his first major league hit, a single, against Nationals' pitcher Tanner Roark. Reynolds was sent down to the 51s to make room for Wilmer Flores, who came off the disabled list. Reynolds appeared in eight games during his first big league stint. He had a .100 batting average.

Reynolds was recalled again on June 3 after David Wright was placed on the disabled list. In a June 22 game, Reynolds started and appeared in the outfield for the first time in his professional career and also hit his first Major League home run, off of reliever Joakim Soria. For 2016, he batted .225/.266/.416. On December 12, 2016, he underwent a right wrist debridement at the Hospital for Special Surgery.

On March 21, 2017, he was optioned to the Mets minor league camp, but he was recalled one month later. In 2017 with the Mets, he batted .230/326/.301 in 130 plate appearances. On February 7, 2018, Reynolds was designated for assignment.

=== Washington Nationals ===
Reynolds was traded to the Washington Nationals for cash considerations on February 12, 2018. He began the season with the Triple–A Syracuse Chiefs, but the Nationals called him up to the major leagues on April 7. He appeared in 10 games and batted 1-for-12 with a walk before the Nationals optioned him back to Syracuse on April 24. He was called up again to replace Anthony Rendon who was placed on the family medical leave list.

The Nationals designated Reynolds for assignment on January 13, 2019, clearing a roster spot for newly signed second baseman Brian Dozier. He cleared waivers and was sent outright to the Triple-A Fresno Grizzlies on January 18. In 111 appearances for Fresno, Reynolds slashed .295/.401/.521 with 16 home runs, 55 RBI, and eight stolen bases. He elected free agency following the season on November 4.

=== Kansas City Royals ===
On November 16, 2019, Reynolds signed a minor league contract with the Kansas City Royals. On September 8, 2020, Reynolds was selected to the active roster by the Royals. On September 12, Reynolds was designated for assignment. He elected free agency on October 14.

=== Chicago White Sox ===
On December 17, 2020, Reynolds signed a minor league contract with the Chicago White Sox organization. Reynolds spent the 2021 season with the Triple-A Charlotte Knights. He played in 93 games for the Knights, hitting .269 with 5 home runs and 35 RBI. Reynolds became a free agent following the season.

=== New York Mets (second stint) ===
On December 1, 2021, Reynolds signed a minor league contract to return to the New York Mets. On April 15, 2022, he was added to the Major League roster when two other players went on the COVID-19 injured list. On April 20, Reynolds was designated for assignment to make room for Mark Canha returning from the COVID-19 injured list.

=== Cincinnati Reds ===
On April 24, 2022, Reynolds was claimed off of waivers by the Cincinnati Reds. He appeared in 92 games for Cincinnati, hitting .246/.320/.332 with 3 home runs and 23 RBI.

On January 13, 2023, Reynolds was designated for assignment by the Reds following the signing of Luke Weaver. On January 19, Reynolds cleared waivers and was sent outright to the Triple-A Louisville Bats. In 16 games with Louisville to begin the year, he slashed .263/.364/.544 with 3 home runs and 9 RBI. On April 28, Reynolds had his contract selected to the active roster. He made 2 appearances, starting 1 game and going 1-for-5 with 3 strikeouts. On May 6, Reynolds was designated for assignment after Wil Myers was activated off of the injured list. He cleared waivers and was outrighted to Louisville on May 9. On October 2, Reynolds elected free agency.

=== Hiroshima Toyo Carp ===
On November 16, 2023, Reynolds signed with the Hiroshima Toyo Carp of Nippon Professional Baseball. He played in two games for the Carp in 2024, going 0–for–4 with a walk and an RBI. On June 20, 2024, Reynolds underwent season–ending surgery on his left shoulder. He was released by the Carp on June 29.

On October 7, 2024, Reynolds announced his retirement from professional baseball via an Instagram post.
