= Ian Gibaut =

American baseball player (born 1993)

- Gibaut with the Durham Bulls

Free agent
- Pitcher
- Born: November 19, 1993 (age 32); Houston, Texas, U.S.
- Bats: Right Throws: Right

MLB debut
- July 12, 2019, for the Tampa Bay Rays

MLB statistics (through 2025 season)
- Win–loss record: 10–9
- Earned run average: 4.18
- Strikeouts: 167
- Stats at Baseball Reference

Teams
- Tampa Bay Rays (2019); Texas Rangers (2019–2020); Minnesota Twins (2021); Cleveland Guardians (2022); Cincinnati Reds (2022–2025)

Ian Philip Gibaut (/dʒɪˈboʊ/ jih-BOH; born November 19, 1993) is an American professional baseball pitcher who is a free agent. He has previously played in Major League Baseball (MLB) for the Tampa Bay Rays, Texas Rangers, Minnesota Twins, Cleveland Guardians, and Cincinnati Reds. He has played for the Great Britain national baseball team at the 2023 World Baseball Classic.

== Career ==
=== Amateur ===
The son of the cricketer Russel Gibaut, he attended Lamar High School in Houston, Texas and played college baseball at Tulane University. In 2014, he played collegiate summer baseball with the Hyannis Harbor Hawks of the Cape Cod Baseball League.

=== Tampa Bay Rays ===
Gibaut was drafted by the Tampa Bay Rays in the 11th round of the 2015 Major League Baseball draft. He made his professional debut with the Princeton Rays and spent all of 2015 there, going 3–1 with a 2.12 ERA in 29 2/3 innings pitched in relief. In 2016, Gibaut pitched for the Bowling Green Hot Rods and Charlotte Stone Crabs where he compiled a combined 2–2 record, 2.53 ERA, and 1.25 WHIP in 57 total innings pitched, and in 2017 he pitched with Charlotte and the Montgomery Biscuits where he was 7–1 with a 2.21 ERA in 48 combined relief appearances between the two teams. Gibaut spent 2018 with the Durham Bulls, going 4–3 with a 2.09 ERA and a 1.00 WHIP, striking out 75 batters in 56 relief innings pitched.

The Rays added Gibaut to their 40-man roster after the 2018 season. He began 2019 on the injured list with Durham. After being activated, he pitched on a rehab assignment for Charlotte and then returned to Durham.

On July 5, 2019, the Rays promoted Gibaut to the major leagues. He made his major league debut on July 12 versus the Baltimore Orioles, allowing two runs and striking out two batters over two innings pitched.

On July 23, 2019, Gibaut was designated for assignment.

=== Texas Rangers ===
On July 28, 2019, Gibaut was traded to the Texas Rangers in exchange for cash considerations or a PTBNL. He was assigned to the Nashville Sounds following the trade. In 9 games for Texas in 2019, Gibaut went 1–1 with a 5.11 ERA over 12 1/3 innings. On December 2, 2019, Gibaut was non-tendered by Texas and became a free agent, but was re-signed to a minor league contract with an invitation to spring training on December 19, 2019. He appeared in 14 games for the Rangers in the 2020 season, collecting 14 strikeouts in 12 1/3 innings.

=== Minnesota Twins ===
On October 30, 2020, Gibaut was claimed off waivers by the Minnesota Twins. On February 19, 2021, Gibaut was outrighted off of the 40-man roster to make space for Matt Shoemaker and was invited to Spring Training as a non-roster invitee. After appearing in 27 games for the St. Paul Saints, posting a 1–3 record with a 7.20 ERA and 46 strikeouts, Gibaut's contract was selected by the Twins on August 27. Gibaut made 3 appearances for the Twins, recording a 2.70 ERA with 4 strikeouts. Gibaut was outrighted off of the 40-man roster on October 8. On October 14, Gibaut elected free agency.

=== Cleveland Guardians ===
On March 17, 2022, Gibaut signed a minor league contract with the Cleveland Guardians. The deal includes an invitation to the Guardians' 2022 major league spring training camp. On June 27, Gibaut was selected to the major league roster. He was designated for assignment the following day after appearing in one game for Cleveland.

=== Cincinnati Reds ===
On June 30, 2022, Gibaut was claimed off waivers by the Los Angeles Dodgers. He was designated for assignment on July 3 without appearing in a game for the organization.

On July 5, 2022, Gibaut was claimed off waivers by the Cincinnati Reds. In 33 appearances for the Reds, he recorded a 4.67 ERA with 48 strikeouts across 34 2/3 innings pitched.

In 2023, Gibaut made 74 appearances out of the bullpen for Cincinnati, registering an 8–4 record and 3.33 ERA with 69 strikeouts and 3 saves across 75 2/3 innings.

Gibaut was placed on the injured list to begin the 2024 season after suffering a strained forearm in spring training. After experiencing "persistent issues" during his rehab, he was shut down from throwing and transferred to the 60–day injured list on May 7, 2024. On May 9, Gibaut underwent an anterior interosseous nerve release procedure to address the injury. He was activated from the injured list on September 24. In 2 games for Cincinnati, he allowed 1 run in 2 innings of work. On November 22, the Reds non–tendered Gibaut, making him a free agent.

On January 29, 2025, Gibaut re-signed with the Reds organization on a minor league contract. On March 25, the Reds selected Gibaut's contract after he made the team's Opening Day roster. On Opening Day, Gibaut had the opportunity to get the save when he came in as the closer with the Reds up 2–3 over the San Francisco Giants to start the ninth inning. However, Gibaut gave up four earned runs in 2/3 of an inning to take the loss as the Reds went down 4–6. In 25 appearances for Cincinnati, he posted an 0–1 record and 4.62 ERA with 15 strikeouts across 25 1/3 innings pitched. On June 30, Gibaut was placed on the injured list with a right shoulder impingement. He began a rehab assignment with Triple-A Louisville on August 4, but was removed following a setback on August 11. On August 21, it was announced that Gibaut had undergone surgery to repair his labrum and reattach his biceps tendon to his upper arm. He was transferred to the 60-day injured list the following day, officially ending his season. On October 28, Gibaut was removed from the 40-man roster and sent outright to Louisville; however, he rejected the assignment and elected free agency three days later.
