= Raynel Espinal =

Dominican baseball player (born 1991)

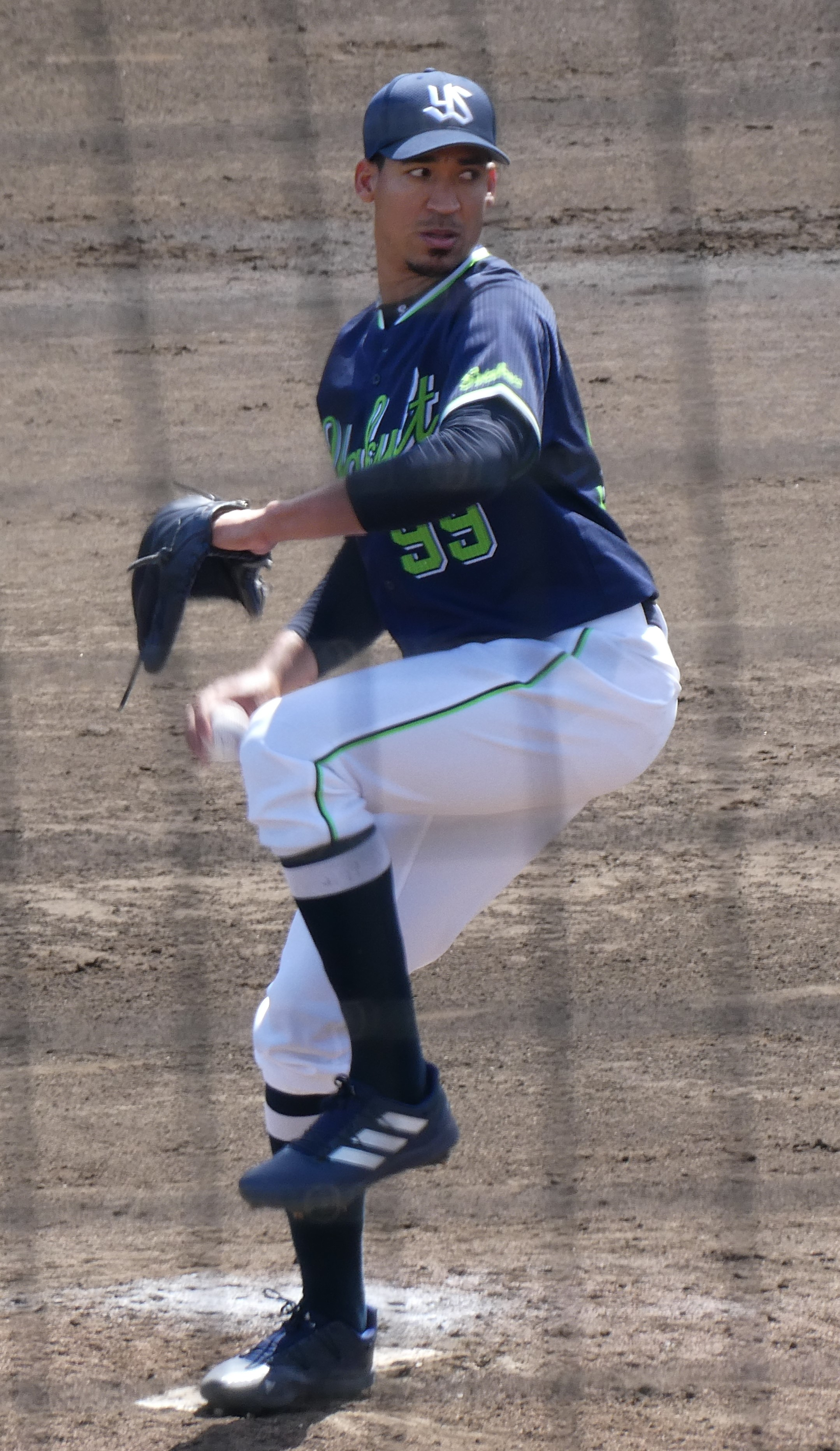
- Espinal with the Tokyo Yakult Swallows

Free agent
- Pitcher
- Born: October 6, 1991 (age 35); Villa González, Dominican Republic
- Bats: Right Throws: Right

Professional debut
- MLB: August 30, 2021, for the Boston Red Sox
- MLB: May 12, 2023, for the Tokyo Yakult Swallows

MLB statistics (through 2022 season)
- Win–loss record: 0–1
- Earned run average: 8.10
- Strikeouts: 5

NPB statistics (through 2023 season)
- Win–loss record: 0–0
- Earned run average: 5.40
- Strikeouts: 4
- Stats at Baseball Reference

Teams
- Boston Red Sox (2021); Cincinnati Reds (2022); Tokyo Yakult Swallows (2023)

Raynel Joseph Espinal (born October 6, 1991) is a Dominican professional baseball pitcher who is a free agent. He has previously played in Major League Baseball (MLB) for the Boston Red Sox and Cincinnati Reds. He has also played in Nippon Professional Baseball (NPB) for the Tokyo Yakult Swallows. Listed at 6 feet 3 inches (1.91 m) and 215 pounds (98 kg), he throws and bats right-handed.

== Professional career ==
=== New York Yankees ===
Espinal began his professional career with the New York Yankees organization, first playing for the Dominican Summer League Yankees in 2013 and 2014. After not playing professionally during 2015, he played for four different Yankees farm teams during 2016, advancing to the Class A Short Season level with the Staten Island Yankees. In 2017, he played for three different teams and reached Double-A with the Trenton Thunder. Espinal then spent all of the 2018 and 2019 seasons in Triple-A with the Scranton/Wilkes-Barre RailRiders. With the RailRiders, he appeared in 59 total games (15 starts) allowing 64 runs in 142 innings pitched for a 4.06 earned run average (ERA). In July 2019, Espinal underwent Tommy John surgery.

=== Boston Red Sox ===
The Red Sox selected Espinal from the Yankees in the minor league phase of the Rule 5 draft after the 2019 season. He did not pitch during 2020, due to cancellation of the minor-league season, then began the 2021 season in Triple-A with the Worcester Red Sox. The Red Sox promoted Espinal to the major leagues on August 30, 2021, to add bullpen depth due to players being placed on the COVID-related list. He made his MLB debut that day, pitching in relief against the Tampa Bay Rays. He was returned to Worcester the next day and removed from the 40-man roster. Worcester named Espinal their pitcher of the year, having gone 11–4 with a 3.55 ERA in Triple-A. Espinal became a free agent following the 2021 season.

=== San Francisco Giants ===
On February 5, 2022, Espinal signed a minor-league contract with the San Francisco Giants. He began the season in Triple-A with the Sacramento River Cats of the Pacific Coast League.

=== Chicago Cubs ===
On July 31, 2022, the Giants traded Espinal to the Chicago Cubs for Dixon Machado. In two appearances, he surrendered 6 runs on 6 hits with 4 strikeouts in 3 1/3 innings pitched. Espinal was released by the Cubs organization on August 16.

=== Cincinnati Reds ===
On August 18, 2022, Espinal signed a minor league contract with the Cincinnati Reds organization. He had his contract selected to the major league roster on September 11. In 2 appearances for the Reds, Espinal allowed 4 runs on 6 hits with 5 strikeouts in 4 2/3 innings of work. On October 15, Espinal was removed from the 40-man roster and sent outright to the Triple–A Louisville Bats. He elected free agency following the season on November 10.

=== Tokyo Yakult Swallows ===
On December 5, 2022, Espinal signed with the Tokyo Yakult Swallows of Nippon Professional Baseball. Espinal made only 3 appearances for the team in 2023, logging a 5.40 ERA with 4 strikeouts in 5.0 innings of work. On August 28, 2023, Espinal was released by the Swallows.

=== Rieleros de Aguascalientes ===
On February 20, 2024, Espinal signed with the Long Island Ducks of the Atlantic League of Professional Baseball. However, prior to the season on April 11, Espinal's contract was purchased by the Rieleros de Aguascalientes of the Mexican League. In 6 games (4 starts), he struggled to an 0–4 record and 11.91 ERA with 7 strikeouts across 11 1/3 innings pitched. On June 19, Espinal was released by Aguascalientes.

=== Gastonia Ghost Peppers ===
On April 21, 2025, Espinal signed with the Gastonia Ghost Peppers of the Atlantic League of Professional Baseball. In 5 starts 17.1 innings he went 0–0 with a 6.75 ERA and 20 strikeouts. He became a free agent following the season.

== International career ==
Espinal pitched for the Dominican Republic national baseball team during qualification for the 2020 Summer Olympics. He has played several seasons of winter baseball with Gigantes del Cibao of the Dominican Professional Baseball League (LIDOM).

== See also ==
- Rule 5 draft results
