= Alejo López =

Mexican baseball player (born 1996)

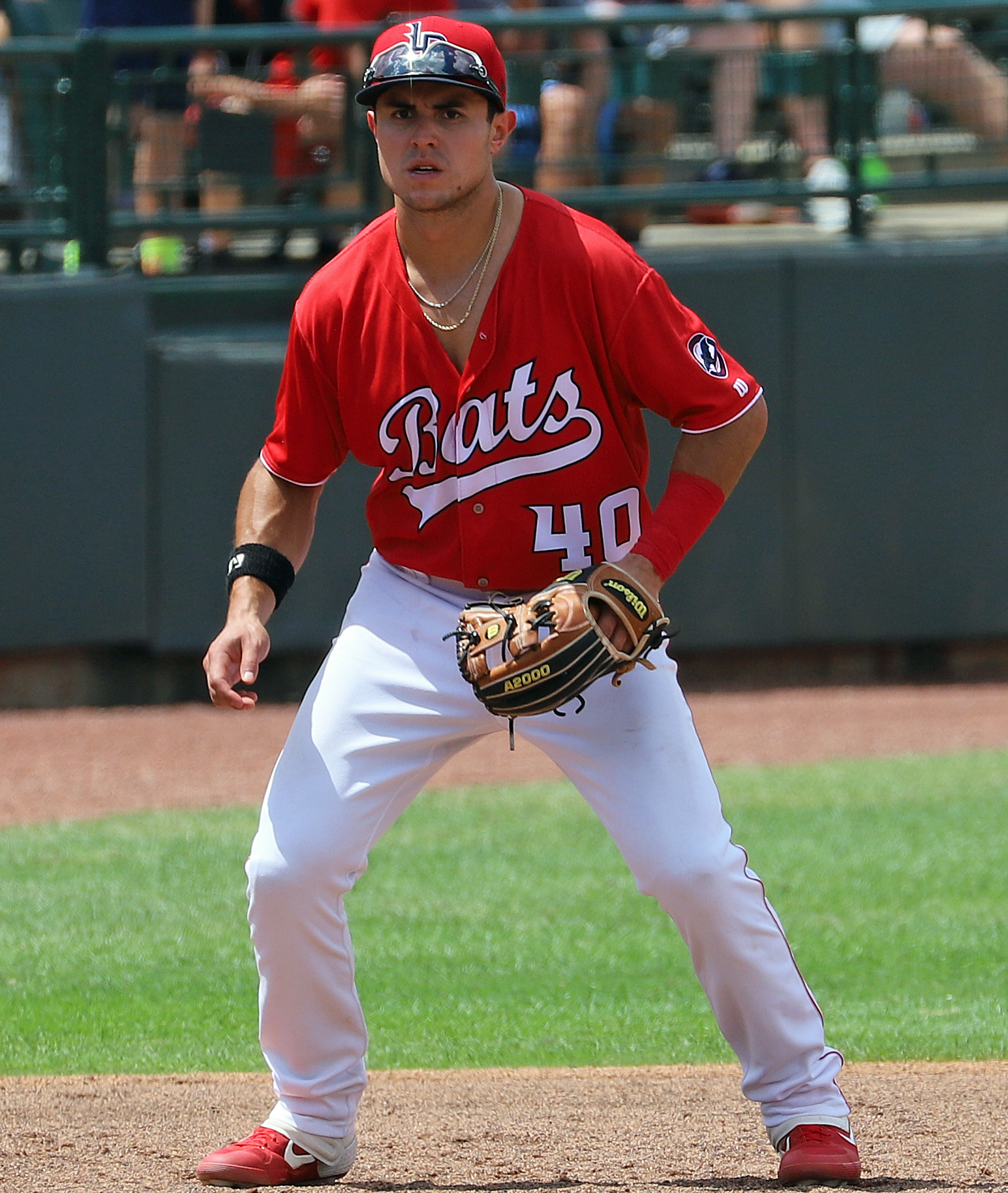
- López with the Louisville Bats in 2021

Free agent
- Infielder
- Born: May 5, 1996 (age 30); Mexico City, Mexico
- Bats: Switch Throws: Right

MLB debut
- June 28, 2021, for the Cincinnati Reds

MLB statistics (through 2023 season)
- Batting average: .265
- Home runs: 1
- Runs batted in: 11
- Stats at Baseball Reference

Teams
- Cincinnati Reds (2021–2023)

Jesús Alejo López (born May 5, 1996) is a Mexican professional baseball infielder who is a free agent. He has previously played in Major League Baseball (MLB) for the Cincinnati Reds.

== Amateur career ==
López attended Greenway High School in Phoenix, Arizona. He was drafted by the Cincinnati Reds in the 27th round of the 2015 Major League Baseball draft.

== Professional career ==
=== Cincinnati Reds ===
López made his professional debut that year with the Arizona League Reds, where he slashed a torrid .419/.526/.484. In 2016, López played for the rookie-level Billings Mustangs, posting a .273/.342/.327 slash line with one home run and 29 RBI. He returned to Billings for the 2017 season, and hit .300/.388/.455 with four home runs and 33 RBI. For the 2018 season, López played for the Single-A Dayton Dragons, slashing .321/.375/.406 in 65 games. In 2019, he played for the High-A Daytona Tortugas and batted .287/.353/.347 with two home runs and fifty RBI.

López did not play in a game in 2020 due to the cancellation of the minor league season because of the COVID-19 pandemic. López began 2021 with the Double-A Chattanooga Lookouts before being promoted to the Triple-A Louisville Bats after hitting .362 in Chattanooga.

On June 28, 2021, López was selected to the 40-man roster and promoted to the major leagues for the first time after hitting .358/.436/.526 with two home runs and 14 RBI in Louisville. López made his Major League debut that day as a pinch hitter against the Philadelphia Phillies. López faced relief pitcher Bailey Falter, where he connected on the first pitch he saw for a single. López finished his rookie campaign with a .261/.261/.261 slash across 14 games.

López appeared in 59 games for Cincinnati in 2022. In 145 at-bats, he batted .262/.314/.331 with 1 home run and 10 RBI.

On February 8, 2023, López was designated for assignment by the Reds following the acquisition of Will Benson. On February 14, López cleared waivers and was sent outright to Triple-A Louisville. In 108 games for Triple–A Louisville, he batted .282/.390/.404 with 7 home runs, 38 RBI, and 15 stolen bases. On August 29, the Reds selected López's contract, adding him to the major league roster. On August 31, López was once again designated for assignment by the Reds, without appearing in a game for the team. He cleared waivers and was sent outright to Louisville on September 2. On September 9, López was selected back to the major league roster as a COVID-19 replacement for Stuart Fairchild. He served as the starting second baseman that day after Noelvi Marte suffered a pregame injury. In the contest against the St. Louis Cardinals, he went 1–for–2 with an RBI before being ejected for arguing a called third strike. The next day, López was removed from the 40–man roster and sent outright to Louisville. On October 2, López elected free agency.

=== Atlanta Braves ===
On October 7, 2023, López signed a minor league contract with the Atlanta Braves. He played in 112 games for the Triple–A Gwinnett Stripers in 2024, hitting .307/.392/.397 with four home runs, 55 RBI, and 21 stolen bases. López was released by the Braves on September 23, 2024.

=== Athletics ===
On November 11, 2024, López signed a minor league contract with the Athletics. He made 117 appearances for the Triple-A Las Vegas Aviators in 2025, slashing .268/.365/.353 with five home runs, 48 RBI, and 17 stolen bases. López elected free agency following the season on November 6, 2025.

=== Seattle Mariners ===
On February 21, 2026, López signed a minor league contract with the Seattle Mariners. In 45 appearances split between the High-A Everett AquaSox and Triple-A Tacoma Rainiers, he batted .314/.390/.431 with two home runs, 16 RBI, and three stolen bases. López was released by the Mariners on July 20.

=== Kansas City Royals ===
On July 22, 2026, López signed a minor league contract with the Kansas City Royals. In 38 games with Triple-A Omaha Storm Chasers he batted .307/.375/.404 with 2 home runs, 15 RBIs and 6 stolen bases. He elected free agency on November 2.
